= Arvo Lamberg =

Finnish footballer (born 1943)

Personal information
- Date of birth: 3 July 1943 (age 83)
- Position: Forward

Senior career*
Years	Team	Apps	(Gls)
1960	Kokkolan Jymy		
1961	Kokkolan Kunto		
1962-1967	GBK		
1968-1974	KPV	157	(48)
1977	Jakobstads BK		
1979	Kokkolan Kunto		

International career
1965–1969	Finland	6	(0)
- * Club domestic league appearances and goals

Arvo Lamberg (born 3 July 1943) is a Finnish former footballer. He played in five matches for the Finland national football team from 1965 to 1969.

In Mestaruussarja, he played 213 games and scored 80 goals. He played 157 games and scored 48 goals for Kokkolan Palloveikot, and played 56 games and scored 32 goals for Gamlakarleby Bollklubb. He also scored 21 goals in Suomensarja for GBK.

In addition to football, Lamberg was also an ice hockey player, playing 11 games in SM-sarja for Kokkolan Hermes.

== Honours ==
=== As a player ===
Kokkolan Palloveikot

- Mestaruussarja: 1969
