= 2003 Ykkönen =

Finnish League Division 1
- Season: 2003

League tables for teams participating in Ykkönen, the second tier of the Finnish Soccer League system, in 2003.

== League table ==
Pos	Team	Pld	W	D	L	GF	GA	GD	Pts	Promotion or relegation
1	TP-47 Tornio (C, P)	26	15	8	3	41	21	+20	53	Promotion to Veikkausliiga
2	RoPS Rovaniemi (P)	26	14	7	5	40	27	+13	49	Qualification to Promotion playoffs
3	FC Viikingit Helsinki	26	13	8	5	38	28	+10	47	
4	FC Honka Espoo	26	12	6	8	47	28	+19	42	
5	VPS Vaasa	26	11	7	8	35	26	+9	40	
6	Kraft Närpiö	26	10	7	9	42	30	+12	37	
7	VG-62 Naantali	26	10	6	10	40	30	+10	36	
8	AC Oulu	26	9	8	9	37	37	0	35	
9	Rakuunat Lappeenranta	26	9	8	9	26	28	−2	35	
10	PP-70 Tampere	26	10	5	11	39	45	−6	35	
11	GBK Kokkola (R)	26	9	5	12	36	45	−9	32	Qualification to Relegation playoffs
12	FC Kuusankoski (O)	26	6	7	13	31	50	−19	25	Qualification to Relegation playoffs
13	OLS Oulu (R)	26	4	7	15	32	52	−20	19	Relegation to Kakkonen
14	FC Korsholm Mustasaari (R)	26	4	3	19	14	51	−37	15	Relegation to Kakkonen

(C) Champions; (O) Play-off winners; (P) Promoted; (R) Relegated

HIFK Helsinki withdrew from the Ykkönen and their place was inherited by Korsholm Mustasaari, the highest placed relegated team in 2002.

== Promotion play-offs ==
KooTeePee Kotka as 13th placed team in the 2003 Veikkausliiga and RoPS as runners-up of the 2003 Ykkönen competed in a two-legged play-off for a place in the Veikkausliiga. RoPS won the play-offs 6-4 on aggregate and were promoted to the Veikkausliiga.

RoPS Rovaniemi - KooTeePee Kotka 4-1
KooTeePee Kotka - RoPS Rovaniemi 3-2

== Relegation play-offs ==
GBK Kokkola - P-Iirot Rauma 1-1
P-Iirot Rauma - GBK Kokkola 3-0

PS Kemi - FC Kuusankoski 2-3
FC Kuusankoski - PS Kemi 2-0

P-Iirot Rauma were promoted to the Ykkönen and GBK Kokkola relegated to the Kakkonen. P-Iirot Rauma won 4-1 on aggregate.
FC Kuusankoski remained in the Ykkönen after beating PS Kemi 5-2 on aggregate.
