= 2025 Kakkonen =

Kakkonen
- Season: 2025
- Promoted: VJS; TPV
- Relegated: HaPK Edustus; JPS; Atlantis 2 Kuopio Elo
- Matches: 326
- Goals: 1,412 (4.33 per match)

The 2025 Kakkonen is the 53rd season of Kakkonen, the fourth-highest football league in Finland. The season began on 12 April and ended in October 2025. It's the second season of the Kakkonen serving as the fourth-tier football league in Finland.

== Teams ==
The league consisted of thirty teams, split into three equal groups (A, B, and C).

Group A

Team	Town
GrIFK	Kauniainen
HaPK Edustus	Hamina
Honka	Espoo
JPS	Jyväskylä
MyPa	Kouvola
PEPO	Lappeenranta
PuiU	Helsinki
Reipas	Lahti
Vaajakoski	Vaajakoski
VJS	Vantaa

Group B

Team Name	Town
Atlantis 2	Helsinki
HJS	Hämeenlinna
HPS	Helsinki
Ilves 2	Tampere
Kiffen	Helsinki
MuSa	Pori
NJS	Nurmijärvi
Pallo-Iirot	Rauma
PPJ	Helsinki
TPV	Tampere

Group C

Team Name	Town
GBK	Kokkola
JBK	Jakobstad
JS Hercules	Oulu
Kraft	Närpes
Kuopio Elo	Kuopio
OsPa	Oulu
SJK 2	Seinäjoki
TP-47	Tornio
VIFK	Vaasa
VPS 2	Vaasa

== League tables ==
=== Group A ===
Pos	Team	Pld	W	D	L	GF	GA	GD	Pts	Qualification	HON	VJS	PUI	PEP	MYP	GRI	REI	VAA	HAP	JPS
1	Honka	18	16	1	1	79	13	+66	49	Qualification for Promotion Group										
2	VJS	18	13	3	2	54	18	+36	42	Qualification for Promotion Group										
3	PuiU	18	10	1	7	32	26	+6	31	Qualification for Promotion Group		1–0								
4	PEPO	18	9	2	7	31	29	+2	29	Qualification for Promotion Group										
5	MyPa	18	8	3	7	47	39	+8	27	Qualification for Promotion Group						2–1				
6	GrIFK	18	7	4	7	37	36	+1	25	Qualification for Promotion Group				4–1						
7	Reipas	18	7	2	9	41	43	−2	23	Qualification for Relegation Group	1–3							3–1		
8	Vaajakoski	18	7	1	10	37	41	−4	22	Qualification for Relegation Group					3–3					
9	HaPK Edustus	18	1	3	14	13	67	−54	6	Qualification for Relegation Group			0–3		0–5					
10	JPS	18	1	2	15	18	77	−59	5	Qualification for Relegation Group		0–6		1–3				1–5		

Source: Soccerway
Legend: Blue = home team win; Yellow = draw; Red = away team win.
Rules for classification: 1) Points; 2) Goal difference; 3) Goals scored; 4) Head-to-head points; 5) Head-to-head goal difference; 6) Head-to-head goals scored; 7) Fewer away goals conceded; 8) Home goals scored; 9) Fewer home goals conceded; 10) Play-off; 11) Draw.

=== Group B ===
Pos	Team	Pld	W	D	L	GF	GA	GD	Pts	Qualification	TPV	ILV	HJS	KIF	PII	HPS	MUS	PPJ	NJS	ATL
1	TPV	18	13	2	3	53	22	+31	41	Qualification for Promotion Group				0–2			7–1			
2	Ilves 2	18	12	4	2	45	22	+23	40	Qualification for Promotion Group				2–0		2–2	2–1			
3	HJS	18	9	5	4	39	26	+13	32	Qualification for Promotion Group	3–3					4–2				
4	Kiffen	18	9	1	8	35	27	+8	28	Qualification for Promotion Group	2–3		1–4							
5	Pallo-Iirot	18	8	3	7	34	24	+10	27	Qualification for Promotion Group								1–1	2–2	
6	HPS	18	7	2	9	23	29	−6	23	Qualification for Promotion Group			0–1							3–1
7	MuSa	18	6	3	9	34	39	−5	21	Qualification for Relegation Group		0–2				1–1				
8	PPJ	18	6	2	10	38	37	+1	20	Qualification for Relegation Group	2–3				3–2					
9	NJS	18	4	6	8	28	40	−12	18	Qualification for Relegation Group		1–1						4–1		3–3
10	Atlantis 2	18	1	2	15	17	80	−63	5	Qualification for Relegation Group				1–6	0–4				2–3	

Source: Soccerway
Legend: Blue = home team win; Yellow = draw; Red = away team win.
Rules for classification: 1) Points; 2) Goal difference; 3) Goals scored; 4) Head-to-head points; 5) Head-to-head goal difference; 6) Head-to-head goals scored; 7) Fewer away goals conceded; 8) Home goals scored; 9) Fewer home goals conceded; 10) Play-off; 11) Draw.

=== Group C ===
Pos	Team	Pld	W	D	L	GF	GA	GD	Pts	Qualification	VPS	GBK	JBK	TP4	OSP	SJK	HER	KRA	VIF	KUO
1	VPS 2	16	10	3	3	47	17	+30	33	Qualification for Promotion Group		3–0								
2	GBK Kokkola	16	10	2	4	33	31	+2	32	Qualification for Promotion Group	0–3			3–3						
3	JBK	16	10	1	5	28	21	+7	31	Qualification for Promotion Group				1–0						
4	TP-47	16	9	2	5	38	44	−6	29	Qualification for Promotion Group						4–3			3–2	
5	OsPa	16	9	1	6	50	32	+18	28	Qualification for Promotion Group			4–1	1–1			5–1			
6	SJK 2	16	8	0	8	45	35	+10	24	Qualification for Promotion Group								2–1		
7	Hercules	16	4	0	12	26	53	−27	12	Qualification for Relegation Group										
8	Kraft	16	3	2	11	25	37	−12	11	Qualification for Relegation Group	2–2	2–3	0–2			2–3				
9	VIFK	16	2	3	11	27	49	−22	9	Qualification for Relegation Group	0–0		1–1				5–1			
10	Kuopio Elo	0	0	0	0	0	0	0	0	Qualification for Relegation Group							1–3			

Source: Soccerway
Legend: Blue = home team win; Yellow = draw; Red = away team win.
Rules for classification: 1) Points; 2) Goal difference; 3) Goals scored; 4) Head-to-head points; 5) Head-to-head goal difference; 6) Head-to-head goals scored; 7) Fewer away goals conceded; 8) Home goals scored; 9) Fewer home goals conceded; 10) Play-off; 11) Draw.

== Promotion Group ==
The top six teams in each group qualify for the Promotion Group and play each team in their group for the third time. The top two teams in each group and the top two third-placed teams advance to the Kakkonen play-offs.

=== Group A ===
Pos	Team	Pld	W	D	L	GF	GA	GD	Pts	Qualification
1	Honka (Q)	23	20	1	2	96	20	+76	61	Qualification for Kakkonen play-offs
2	VJS (Q)	23	17	3	3	78	23	+55	54	Qualification for Kakkonen play-offs
3	PEPO	23	12	3	8	44	41	+3	39	
4	PuiU	23	11	3	9	42	36	+6	36	
5	MyPa	23	9	3	11	53	68	−15	30	
6	GrIFK	23	7	5	11	44	50	−6	26	

Updated to match(es) played on 14 September 2025. Source: Soccerway
Rules for classification: 1) Points; 2) Goal difference; 3) Goals scored; 4) Head-to-head points; 5) Head-to-head goal difference; 6) Head-to-head goals scored; 7) Fewer away goals conceded; 8) Home goals scored; 9) Fewer home goals conceded; 10) Play-off; 11) Draw.
(Q) Qualified for the phase indicated

=== Group B ===
Pos	Team	Pld	W	D	L	GF	GA	GD	Pts	Qualification
1	Ilves 2 (Q)	23	17	4	2	67	29	+38	55	Qualification for Kakkonen play-offs
2	TPV (Q)	23	16	2	5	64	31	+33	50	Qualification for Kakkonen play-offs
3	HJS (Q)	23	12	5	6	46	32	+14	41	Qualification for Kakkonen play-offs
4	HPS	23	10	2	11	33	40	−7	32	
5	Kiffen	23	10	1	12	47	42	+5	31	
6	Pallo-Iirot	23	8	3	12	39	43	−4	27	

Updated to match(es) played on 21 September 2025. Source: Soccerway
Rules for classification: 1) Points; 2) Goal difference; 3) Goals scored; 4) Head-to-head points; 5) Head-to-head goal difference; 6) Head-to-head goals scored; 7) Fewer away goals conceded; 8) Home goals scored; 9) Fewer home goals conceded; 10) Play-off; 11) Draw.
(Q) Qualified for the phase indicated

=== Group C ===
Pos	Team	Pld	W	D	L	GF	GA	GD	Pts	Qualification
1	VPS 2 (Q)	21	14	3	4	72	24	+48	45	Qualification for Kakkonen play-offs
2	GBK Kokkola (Q)	21	13	4	4	47	35	+12	43	Qualification for Kakkonen play-offs
3	JBK (Q)	21	13	2	6	38	27	+11	41	Qualification for Kakkonen play-offs
4	OsPa	21	10	2	9	56	46	+10	32	
5	TP-47	21	9	4	8	44	68	−24	31	
6	SJK 2	21	9	0	12	56	52	+4	27	

Updated to match(es) played on 21 September 2025. Source: Soccerway
Rules for classification: 1) Points; 2) Goal difference; 3) Goals scored; 4) Head-to-head points; 5) Head-to-head goal difference; 6) Head-to-head goals scored; 7) Fewer away goals conceded; 8) Home goals scored; 9) Fewer home goals conceded; 10) Play-off; 11) Draw.
(Q) Qualified for the phase indicated

== Relegation Group ==
The bottom four teams in each group qualify for the Relegation Group and play each team in their group for the third time. The bottom two teams in each group are relegated to the 2026 Kolmonen.

=== Group A ===
Pos	Team	Pld	W	D	L	GF	GA	GD	Pts	Relegation
1	Reipas	24	13	2	9	79	49	+30	41	
2	Vaajakoski	24	10	2	12	55	53	+2	32	
3	HaPK Edustus (R)	24	2	3	19	19	92	−73	9	Relegation to Kolmonen
4	JPS (R)	24	2	3	19	29	107	−78	9	Relegation to Kolmonen

Updated to match(es) played on 4 October 2025. Source:
Rules for classification: 1) Points; 2) Goal difference; 3) Goals scored; 4) Head-to-head points; 5) Head-to-head goal difference; 6) Head-to-head goals scored; 7) Fewer away goals conceded; 8) Home goals scored; 9) Fewer home goals conceded; 10) Play-off; 11) Draw.
(R) Relegated

=== Group B ===
Pos	Team	Pld	W	D	L	GF	GA	GD	Pts	Relegation
1	MuSa	24	11	3	10	54	41	+13	36	
2	PPJ	24	11	2	11	57	42	+15	35	
3	NJS (R)	24	6	6	12	42	56	−14	24	Relegation to Kolmonen
4	Atlantis 2 (R)	24	1	2	21	19	112	−93	5	Relegation to Kolmonen

Updated to match(es) played on 4 October 2025. Source:
Rules for classification: 1) Points; 2) Goal difference; 3) Goals scored; 4) Head-to-head points; 5) Head-to-head goal difference; 6) Head-to-head goals scored; 7) Fewer away goals conceded; 8) Home goals scored; 9) Fewer home goals conceded; 10) Play-off; 11) Draw.
(R) Relegated

=== Group C ===
Pos	Team	Pld	W	D	L	GF	GA	GD	Pts	Relegation
1	Hercules	20	6	0	14	31	61	−30	18	
2	Kraft	20	5	2	13	34	43	−9	17	
3	VIFK (R)	20	4	3	13	34	56	−22	15	Relegation to Kolmonen

Updated to match(es) played on 4 October 2025. Source:
Rules for classification: 1) Points; 2) Goal difference; 3) Goals scored; 4) Head-to-head points; 5) Head-to-head goal difference; 6) Head-to-head goals scored; 7) Fewer away goals conceded; 8) Home goals scored; 9) Fewer home goals conceded; 10) Play-off; 11) Draw.
(R) Relegated

== Kakkonen play-offs ==
=== Semi-finals ===
==== First leg ====
28 September 2025	JBK (3nd, Group C)	0–0	Ilves 2 (1st, Group B)

28 September 2025	HJS (3nd, Group B)	2–3	Honka (1st, Group A)

27 September 2025	GBK Kokkola (2nd, Group C)	1–6	VJS (2nd, Group A)

29 September 2025	TPV (2nd, Group B)	2–1	VPS 2 (1st, Group C)

==== Second leg ====
5 October 2025	Ilves 2 (1st, Group B)	1–0 (1–0 agg.)	JBK (3nd, Group C)

5 October 2025	Honka (1st, Group A)	2–0 (5–2 agg.)	HJS (3nd, Group B)

5 October 2025	VJS (2nd, Group A)	8–1 (14–2 agg.)	GBK (2nd, Group C)

6 October 2025	VPS 2 (1st, Group C)	3–3 (4–5 agg.)	TPV (2nd, Group B)

=== Finals ===
==== First leg ====
11 October 2025	VJS (2nd, Group A)	3–1	Honka (1st, Group A)

16 October 2025	TPV (2nd, Group B)	3–0	Ilves 2 (1st, Group B)

==== Second leg ====
20 October 2025	Honka (1st, Group A)	2–1 (3–4 agg.)	VJS (2nd, Group A)

20 October 2025	Ilves 2 (1st, Group B)	1–2 (1–5 agg.)	TPV (2nd, Group B)
