= Porin Ässät (men's football) =

Football club based in Pori, Finland

- Founded: 1967
- Dissolved: 1981
- Stadium: Porin Stadion, Pori
- Capacity: 12,300
- 1981: II-Divisioona, 12th place
Home colours	Away colours

Porin Ässät (Finnish pronunciation: [ˈporin æsːæt]; Finnish for Pori Aces) was a football club from Pori, Finland. It was established in 1967 as two local sports clubs Karhut and RU-38 merged. The football section was dissolved in 1981 and today Ässät is known as an ice hockey club.

Ässät played two seasons in the Finnish premier division Mestaruussarja (1968, 1969) and two seasons in the second tier Suomensarja (1970, 1971). In 1970 Ässät won the U-19 Finnish Championship title.

== History ==
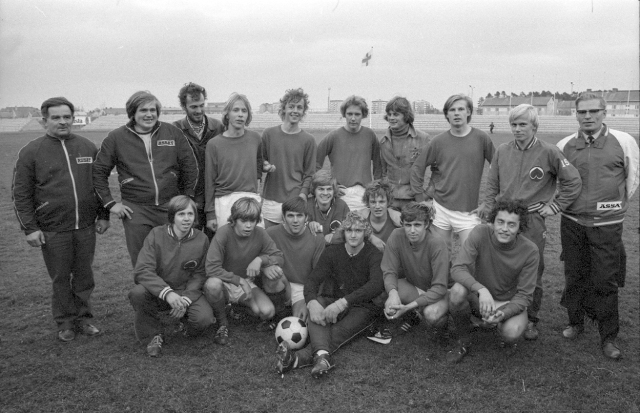
Porin Ässät A-juniors in 1970, the year they won the Finnish Championship.

Ässät was established in 1967 when two clubs from Pori, Porin Karhut and RU-38, merged. The ice hockey team of Ässät got Karhut's place in the SM-sarja, while the Ässät's football team inherited RU-38's place in the Mestaruussarja. The Karhut football team continued its activities for one more season as Ässät's secondary team in Suomensarja, the second-tier league of Finland at the time.

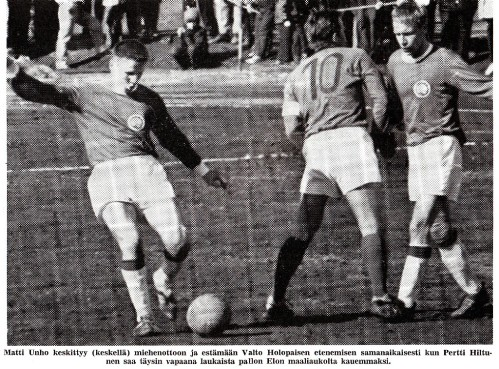
Porin Ässät playing against Kuopion Elo on May 4, 1969

Ässät played its first two seasons in the Mestaruussarja, the Premier League of Finland. Ässät got relegated to II Divisioona at the end of the 1969 season and never got promoted to the top-tier again. After two seasons of playing in the 2nd division, Ässät was relegated to the 3rd division.

Ässät won the A-junior Finnish Championship in 1970.

In 1972, Ässät was promoted back to the 2nd division, but realignment placed the division in the third-tier. Ässät came in 2nd in the 2nd division in 1973, but lost in the promotion qualifiers to Turun Toverit (TuTo). Ässät got relegated to the 3rd division in 1978, but only played there for one season before getting promoted back. Ässät played two more seasons in the 2nd division before being relegated and disestablished in 1981 and had all its players moved to the newly formed Porin Palloilijat.

== Season to season ==
Season	Level	Division	Section	Administration	Position	Movements
1968	Tier 1	Mestaruussarja (Premier League)		Finnish FA (Suomen Palloliitto)	10th	Took RU-38's place in mestaruussarja
1969	Tier 1	Mestaruussarja (Premier League)		Finnish FA (Suomen Palloliitto)	12th	Relegated
1970	Tier 2	II Divisioona (Second Division)	West Group	Finnish FA (Suomen Palloliitto)	7th	
1971	Tier 2	II Divisioona (Second Division)	West Group	Finnish FA (Suomen Palloliitto)	10th	Relegated
1972	Tier 3	III Divisioona (Third Division)	Group 3	Finnish FA (Suomen Palloliitto)	1st	Promoted
1973	Tier 3	II Divisioona (Second Division)	West Group	Finnish FA (Suomen Palloliitto)	1st	Promotion Playoff
1974	Tier 3	II Divisioona (Second Division)	West Group	Finnish FA (Suomen Palloliitto)	2nd	
1975	Tier 3	II Divisioona (Second Division)	West Group	Finnish FA (Suomen Palloliitto)	6th	
1976	Tier 3	II Divisioona (Second Division)	West Group	Finnish FA (Suomen Palloliitto)	5th	
1977	Tier 3	II Divisioona (Second Division)	West Group	Finnish FA (Suomen Palloliitto)	8th	
1978	Tier 3	II Divisioona (Second Division)	West Group	Finnish FA (Suomen Palloliitto)	12th	Relegated
1979	Tier 4	III Divisioona (Third Division)	Group 4	Finnish FA (Suomen Palloliitto)	2nd	Promotion Playoff - Promoted
1980	Tier 3	II Divisioona (Second Division)	West Group	Finnish FA (Suomen Palloliitto)	4th	
1981	Tier 3	II Divisioona (Second Division)	West Group	Finnish FA (Suomen Palloliitto)	12th	Relegated - Disbanded

- 2 seasons in Mestaruussarja
- 10 season in II Divisioona
- 2 season in III Divisioona

== Alumni ==
- Esa Furuholm
- Tapio Furuholm
- Juha Granath
- Keijo Koistinen
- Tapio Koskinen
- Pertti Lundell
- Jarmo Manninen
- Kaj Matalamäki
- Timo Mäkelä
- Risto Puustinen
- Pekka Rautakallio
- Seppo Sairanen
- Raimo Tuli
- Matti Unho

== Honors ==
=== II Divisioona ===
(gold) Western Group winner (1): 1973 (promotion playoff),

(silver) Western Group runner-up (1): 1974,

=== III Divisioona ===
(gold) Group 3 winner (1): 1972 (promoted),

(silver) Group 3 runner-up (1): 1979 (promoted),

=== A-junior ===
(gold) Finnish Championship (1): 1970

== See also ==
- Ässät Hockey
