= 1995 Ykkönen – Finnish League Division 1 =

Finnish League Division 1
- Season: 1995
- Champions: FC Inter Turku
- Promoted: FC Inter Turku
- Relegated: KuPS; PP-70

League table for teams participating in Ykkönen, the second tier of the Finnish Soccer League system, in 1995.

== League table ==
Pos	Team	Pld	W	D	L	GF	GA	GD	Pts
1	Inter, Turku	26	17	5	4	63	20	+43	56
2	KTP, Kotka	26	11	9	6	45	37	+8	42
3	Kultsu, Joutseno	26	12	5	9	29	33	−4	41
4	Reipas, Lahti	26	11	7	8	34	36	−2	40
5	KePS, Kemi	26	9	11	6	48	35	+13	38
6	P-Iirot, Rauma	26	11	5	10	44	48	−4	38
7	K-Team, Hämeenlinna	26	8	10	8	42	37	+5	34
8	KontU, Helsinki	26	7	13	6	39	38	+1	34
9	Gnistan, Helsinki	26	7	13	6	28	27	+1	34
10	GBK, Kokkola	26	8	10	8	36	44	−8	34
11	Rakuunat, Lappeenranta	26	8	7	11	34	38	−4	31
12	KuPS, Kuopio	26	6	7	13	27	36	−9	25
13	PV Kokkola, Kokkola	26	5	9	12	28	36	−8	24
14	PP-70, Tampere	26	3	7	16	24	56	−32	16

=== Promotion play-offs ===
- KTP Kotka – MP Mikkeli 0–1
- MP Mikkeli – KTP Kotka 2–0

Mikkelin Palloilijat won 3-0 on aggregate and remained in the Veikkausliiga.

== See also ==
- Veikkausliiga (Tier 1)
- 1995 Finnish Cup
