= 1995 Veikkausliiga =

Veikkausliiga
- Season: 1995
- Champions: Haka Valkeakoski

The 1995 Veikkausliiga was a season of the Veikkausliiga, the top level football league in Finland. It was contested by 14 teams, with Haka Valkeakoski winning the championship.

== League standings ==
| Pos | Team | Pld | W | D | L | GF | GA | GD | Pts | Qualification or relegation |
|---|---|---|---|---|---|---|---|---|---|---|
| 1 | Haka Valkeakoski (C) | 26 | 18 | 5 | 3 | 56 | 17 | +39 | 59 | Qualification to UEFA Cup preliminary round |
| 2 | MyPa Anjalankoski | 26 | 16 | 5 | 5 | 45 | 20 | +25 | 53 | Qualification to Cup Winners' Cup qualifying round (Note: MyPa Anjalankoski as winners of the 1995 Finnish Cup qualified for the qualifying round of the 1996–97 Cup Winners' Cup.) |
| 3 | HJK Helsinki | 26 | 14 | 10 | 2 | 44 | 18 | +26 | 52 | Qualification to UEFA Cup preliminary round |
| 4 | FC Jazz Pori | 26 | 12 | 6 | 8 | 43 | 29 | +14 | 42 | Qualification to UEFA Cup preliminary round |
| 5 | Jaro Jakobstad | 26 | 11 | 5 | 10 | 37 | 32 | +5 | 38 | Qualification to Intertoto Cup group stage |
| 6 | TPS Turku | 26 | 10 | 6 | 10 | 33 | 32 | +1 | 36 | |
| 7 | Ilves Tampere | 26 | 9 | 7 | 10 | 36 | 39 | −3 | 34 | |
| 8 | FinnPa Helsinki | 26 | 9 | 5 | 12 | 40 | 40 | 0 | 32 | |
| 9 | RoPS Rovaniemi | 26 | 8 | 8 | 10 | 29 | 30 | −1 | 32 | |
| 10 | VPS Vaasa | 26 | 10 | 2 | 14 | 26 | 34 | −8 | 32 | |
| 11 | MP Mikkeli (O) | 26 | 7 | 7 | 12 | 23 | 35 | −12 | 28 | Qualification to relegation play-offs |
| 12 | TPV Tampere (R) | 26 | 6 | 6 | 14 | 33 | 48 | −15 | 24 | Relegation to Ykkönen |
| 13 | Kuusysi Lahti (R) | 26 | 6 | 5 | 15 | 23 | 50 | −27 | 23 | Relegation to Ykkönen |
| 14 | Ponnistus Helsinki (R) | 26 | 6 | 3 | 17 | 19 | 63 | −44 | 21 | Relegation to Ykkönen |

Source: rsssf.com
(C) Champions; (O) Play-off winners; (R) Relegated

== Results ==
| Home \ Away | FPA | HAK | HJK | ILV | JAR | JAZ | KUU | MP | MYP | PON | RPS | TPS | TPV | VPS |
|---|---|---|---|---|---|---|---|---|---|---|---|---|---|---|
| FinnPa | | 1–3 | 0–1 | 1–3 | 1–1 | 4–0 | 5–0 | 1–1 | 0–2 | 6–0 | 0–1 | 1–0 | 3–0 | 3–2 |
| FC Haka | 0–0 | | 2–2 | 0–1 | 1–1 | 5–0 | 4–1 | 4–0 | 3–0 | 3–0 | 4–2 | 1–1 | 1–0 | 2–0 |
| HJK Helsinki | 2–0 | 2–0 | | 4–0 | 0–0 | 1–2 | 2–0 | 0–0 | 1–1 | 5–0 | 1–0 | 0–0 | 1–1 | 4–1 |
| Ilves | 0–0 | 0–1 | 1–1 | | 2–3 | 0–0 | 1–1 | 5–1 | 0–2 | 1–1 | 1–0 | 1–4 | 4–2 | 1–0 |
| FF Jaro | 3–1 | 1–3 | 1–2 | 1–2 | | 0–2 | 3–0 | 4–0 | 1–3 | 3–0 | 0–1 | 4–2 | 4–2 | 1–0 |
| FC Jazz | 3–1 | 0–1 | 1–2 | 2–2 | 2–0 | | 3–0 | 0–2 | 0–0 | 3–0 | 4–0 | 4–1 | 4–1 | 1–2 |
| Kuusysi | 3–1 | 0–1 | 1–1 | 3–2 | 1–1 | 0–3 | | 2–1 | 1–3 | 3–1 | 0–1 | 0–1 | 0–0 | 0–1 |
| MPS | 3–0 | 0–3 | 2–2 | 1–1 | 0–1 | 1–3 | 0–1 | | 0–1 | 1–0 | 2–1 | 3–1 | 0–1 | 2–0 |
| MyPa | 1–2 | 3–1 | 1–0 | 4–0 | 2–0 | 1–1 | 3–2 | 1–0 | | 5–0 | 0–0 | 3–0 | 1–1 | 3–1 |
| Ponnistus | 1–2 | 0–6 | 0–2 | 0–3 | 0–2 | 0–2 | 3–1 | 2–1 | 0–1 | | 0–0 | 2–1 | 1–0 | 3–2 |
| RoPS | 0–0 | 0–1 | 2–3 | 3–2 | 1–1 | 1–1 | 1–1 | 0–0 | 3–1 | 4–1 | | 0–1 | 3–4 | 2–0 |
| TPS | 5–1 | 1–3 | 0–0 | 2–1 | 3–0 | 2–1 | 0–1 | 0–0 | 1–3 | 0–0 | 1–0 | | 3–0 | 2–1 |
| TPV | 4–3 | 0–2 | 2–4 | 1–2 | 0–1 | 1–1 | 4–1 | 1–1 | 1–0 | 4–1 | 1–3 | 1–1 | | 0–1 |
| VPS | 1–3 | 1–1 | 0–1 | 1–0 | 1–0 | 1–0 | 4–0 | 0–1 | 1–0 | 2–3 | 0–0 | 1–0 | 2–1 | |

Legend: Blue = home team win; Yellow = draw; Red = away team win.

== Attendances ==
| No. | Club | Average |
|---|---|---|
| 1 | HJK | 3,418 |
| 2 | VPS | 2,965 |
| 3 | Jazz | 2,796 |
| 4 | TPV | 2,524 |
| 5 | FinnPa | 2,499 |
| 6 | Haka | 2,392 |
| 7 | TPS | 2,225 |
| 8 | Ilves | 2,214 |
| 9 | MyPa | 1,918 |
| 10 | Jaro | 1,727 |
| 11 | Kuusysi | 1,622 |
| 12 | MP | 1,591 |
| 13 | RoPS | 1,509 |
| 14 | Ponnistus | 852 |

== See also ==
- Ykkönen (Tier 2)
- Suomen Cup 1995
