= 2001 Kakkonen – Finnish League Division 2 =

Finnish League Division 2
- Season: 2001
- Champions: FC Viikingit; FC KooTeePee; VG-62; FC Korsholm
- Promoted: Above teams and; PP-70
- Relegated: 11 teams

League Tables for teams participating in Kakkonen, the third tier of the Finnish Soccer League system, in 2001.

== League Tables 2001 ==
=== Southern Group, Etelälohko ===
Pos	Team	Pld	W	D	L	GF	GA	GD	Pts
1	FC Viikingit, Helsinki (C, P)	22	15	5	2	56	19	+37	50
2	Ponnistus, Helsinki (O)	22	12	4	6	41	27	+14	40
3	LePa, Espoo	22	10	6	6	41	24	+17	36
4	IFK Mariehamn, Mariehamn	22	10	4	8	48	37	+11	34
5	KäPa, Helsinki	22	9	4	9	42	35	+7	31
6	Ponnistajat, Helsinki	22	9	4	9	37	43	−6	31
7	Kiffen, Helsinki	21	8	5	8	25	27	−2	29
8	TP Lahti, Lahti	22	8	3	11	29	45	−16	27
9	HyPS, Hyvinkää	22	8	3	11	32	49	−17	27
10	Nateva, Nurmijärvi (R)	22	6	6	10	29	43	−14	24
11	MPS, Helsinki (R)	22	7	1	14	31	53	−22	22
12	JäPS, Järvenpää (R)	22	6	2	14	37	46	−9	20

(C) Champions; (O) Play-off winners; (P) Promoted; (R) Relegated

=== Eastern Group, Itälohko ===
Pos	Team	Pld	W	D	L	GF	GA	GD	Pts
1	FC KooTeePee, Kotka (C, P)	22	17	5	0	87	11	+76	56
2	Koparit, Kuopio (O)	22	13	8	1	69	20	+49	47
3	Warkaus JK, Varkaus	22	14	5	3	55	26	+29	47
4	Kings, Kuopio	22	10	9	3	32	24	+8	39
5	Ratanat, Joensuu	22	9	7	6	44	29	+15	34
6	JiiPee, Joensuu	22	8	7	7	42	25	+17	31
7	SäyRi, Jyväskylä	22	8	7	7	42	33	+9	31
8	JJK, Jyväskylä	22	6	8	8	33	23	+10	26
9	Pallo-Lahti, Lahti	22	6	6	10	40	43	−3	24
10	PEPO, Lappeenranta (R)	22	6	2	14	33	60	−27	20
11	KiuPa, Kiuruvesi (R)	22	3	0	19	30	100	−70	9
12	KeuPa, Keuruu (R)	22	0	0	22	13	126	−113	0

(C) Champions; (O) Play-off winners; (P) Promoted; (R) Relegated

=== Western Group, Länsilohko ===
Pos	Team	Pld	W	D	L	GF	GA	GD	Pts
1	VG-62, Naantali (C, P)	22	13	4	5	43	26	+17	43
2	PP-70, Tampere (O, P)	22	12	6	4	47	29	+18	42
3	KaIK, Kaskinen	22	12	3	7	54	39	+15	39
4	PS-44, Valkeakoski	22	11	6	5	43	29	+14	39
5	KaaPo, Kaarina	22	10	5	7	53	38	+15	35
6	PIF, Pargas	22	10	4	8	34	38	−4	34
7	TPK, Turku	22	11	0	11	41	34	+7	33
8	TPV, Tampere	22	9	4	9	30	41	−11	31
9	FC Rauma, Rauma	22	8	6	8	44	35	+9	30
10	ÅIFK, Turku (R)	22	4	8	10	23	36	−13	20
11	Ilves, Tampere (R)	22	3	5	14	16	36	−20	14
12	Vilpas, Salo (R)	22	1	5	16	20	67	−47	8

(C) Champions; (O) Play-off winners; (P) Promoted; (R) Relegated

=== Northern Group, Pohjoislohko ===
Pos	Team	Pld	W	D	L	GF	GA	GD	Pts
1	FC Korsholm, Korsholm (C, P)	20	14	4	2	54	21	+33	46
2	GBK, Kokkola (O)	20	13	3	4	57	20	+37	42
3	JBK, Jakobstad	20	12	4	4	48	24	+24	40
4	FC Kiisto, Vaasa	20	11	1	8	39	32	+7	34
5	KPV-j, Kokkola	20	8	5	7	33	32	+1	29
6	PS Kemi, Kemi	20	8	4	8	32	33	−1	28
7	Sepsi-78, Seinäjoki	20	8	4	8	43	48	−5	28
8	KajHa, Kajaani	20	7	3	10	32	36	−4	24
9	OLS, Oulu	20	7	2	11	39	43	−4	23
10	FC-88, Kemi (R)	20	3	2	15	30	62	−32	11
11	FC YPA, Ylivieska (R)	20	3	0	17	17	73	−56	9

(C) Champions; (O) Play-off winners; (P) Promoted; (R) Relegated

=== Promotion Playoffs ===
- Koparit – Ponnistus 2–2
- Ponnistus – Koparit 0–0
- GBK – PP-70 1–3
- PP-70 – GBK 1–0
- Koparit – IF Gnistan 0–2
- IF Gnistan – Koparit 4–2

IF Gnistan retain their place in the Ykkönen.

- PP-70 – FC Mikkeli 1–0
- FC Mikkeli – PP-70 2–1

PP-70 are promoted to Ykkönen.

== Leading goal scorers ==
Etelälohko

- 22 - Peter Lundberg IFK Mariehamn
- 20 - Vjatšeslav Malakejev FC Viikingit
- 15 - Janne Mäkitalo JäPS

Itälohko

- 19 - Tommi Keveri FC KooTeePee
- 18 - Kim Liljeqvist FC KooTeePee
- 14 - Mikko Pantsu Koparit, Tero Tahvanainen Ratanat

Länsilohko

- 17 - Claes-Johan Siegfrids KaIK
- 14 - Matti Heimo VG-62, Jouni Santanen KaIK
- 12 - Petri Merisaari KaaPo

Pohjoislohko

- 16 - Alexander Andraschuk JBK
- 15 - Jussi Roiko GBK
- 13 - Pekka Kainu KPV-j

== References and sources ==
- Finnish FA, Suomen Palloliitto
- Kakkonen (in Finnish)
