= 2021 Ykkönen =

Ykkönen
- Season: 2021
- Champions: VPS
- Promoted: VPS
- Relegated: Klubi 04; MuSa; Jippo

The 2021 Ykkönen was the 50th season of Ykkönen in its current format as the second tier of Finnish football since its inception in 1973. The season began on 5 May 2021 and ended on 23 October 2021.

== Teams ==
Twelve teams compete in the league. Following the 2020 season, AC Oulu (champions) and KPT were promoted to the Veikkausliiga. They were replaced by TPS and RoPS, who were relegated from the first tier. Kajaani, SJK Akatemia and MYPA were relegated to Kakkonen and replaced by the 2020 Kakkonen champions, Klubi 04, JIPPO and PK35.

=== Stadiums and locations ===
Location of teams in 2021 Ykkönen

The following teams are participating in the 2021 Ykkönen season.

Club	Location	Stadium	Capacity	Manager
Ekenäs IF	Ekenäs	Ekenäs Sparbank Arena	2,500	(Spain) Guillem Santesmases
FF Jaro	Jakobstad	Jakobstads Centralplan	5,000	(Finland) Niklas Vidjeskog
Gnistan	Helsinki	Mustapekka Areena	1,000	(Finland) Jussi Leppälahti
JIPPO	Joensuu	Keskuskenttä (Joensuu)	1,000	(Finland) Mika Nuutinen
Klubi 04	Helsinki	Bolt Arena	10,770	(Finland) Mika Lehkosuo
KPV	Kokkola	Kokkolan keskuskenttä	3,000	(Finland) Janne Hyppönen
MP	Mikkeli	Mikkelin Urheilupuisto	7,000	(Finland) Juha Pasoja
MuSa	Pori	Porin Stadion	12,300	(Finland) Mika Lähderinne
PK-35	Vantaa	Myyrmäen jalkapallostadion	4,700	(Finland) Jari Pyykölä
RoPS	Rovaniemi	Rovaniemen keskuskenttä	2,803	(Finland) Jari Ilola
TPS	Turku	Veritas Stadion	9,372	(Finland) Jonatan Johansson
VPS	Vaasa	Hietalahti Stadium	4,600	(Finland) Jussi Nuorela

== Regular season ==
=== League table ===
Pos	Team	Pld	W	D	L	GF	GA	GD	Pts	Qualification
1	RoPS	22	12	6	4	39	25	+14	42	Qualification for the Promotion Round
2	TPS	22	11	7	4	32	18	+14	40	Qualification for the Promotion Round
3	VPS	22	11	6	5	39	27	+12	39	Qualification for the Promotion Round
4	FF Jaro	22	9	7	6	31	24	+7	34	Qualification for the Promotion Round
5	EIF	22	8	6	8	40	33	+7	30	Qualification for the Promotion Round
6	Gnistan	22	9	3	10	30	31	−1	30	Qualification for the Promotion Round
7	PK-35	22	8	6	8	26	30	−4	30	Qualification for the Relegation Round
8	KPV	22	7	8	7	26	25	+1	29	Qualification for the Relegation Round
9	MP	22	6	7	9	29	35	−6	25	Qualification for the Relegation Round
10	JIPPO	22	6	3	13	15	28	−13	21	Qualification for the Relegation Round
11	MuSa	22	4	9	9	22	41	−19	21	Qualification for the Relegation Round
12	Klubi 04	22	6	2	14	26	38	−12	20	Qualification for the Relegation Round

Source: Soccerway
Rules for classification: 1) Points; 2) Goal difference; 3) Goals scored; 4) Head-to-head points; 5) Head-to-head goal difference; 6) Head-to-head away goals scored; 7) Play-off
(Note: Play-off is only played if need to decide champion, teams for relegation or UEFA competition and will be played on a neutral ground).

=== Results ===
Home \ Away	EIF	JAR	GNS	JIP	KLU	KPV	MIP	MUA	PKK	RPS	TPS	VPS
EIF	—	3–1	2–0	3–0	1–2	1–1	2–1	2–2	0–0	3–2	1–2	2–3
FF Jaro	1–1	—	2–2	1–0	4–1	0–0	2–2	0–0	1–1	0–1	0–2	1–1
Gnistan	0–3	0–1	—	1–0	1–0	0–3	0–2	1–1	4–1	1–2	0–0	2–0
JIPPO	2–0	0–2	1–4	—	1–0	0–1	4–2	1–1	0–1	1–2	0–1	1–1
Klubi 04	5–3	0–1	0–3	0–1	—	0–2	3–1	4–0	0–1	0–1	2–4	1–0
KPV	2–1	0–2	0–2	1–0	2–2	—	1–0	1–2	3–0	1–1	1–1	1–2
MP	2–1	1–2	2–1	4–1	2–0	2–1	—	0–0	1–1	0–0	1–2	0–3
MuSa	2–6	1–5	2–4	0–0	1–1	1–0	2–2	—	1–1	3–1	0–2	3–0
PK-35	2–3	2–1	3–2	0–1	2–1	3–0	3–1	1–0	—	1–3	0–0	2–2
RoPS	0–0	3–1	1–2	2–0	4–1	3–3	1–1	2–0	2–0	—	0–1	3–2
TPS	1–1	1–2	3–0	0–1	0–1	0–0	2–2	3–0	2–1	2–3	—	1–1
VPS	2–1	2–1	2–0	1–0	3–2	2–2	3–0	4–0	2–0	2–2	1–2	—

Source: Soccerway
Legend: Blue = home team win; Yellow = draw; Red = away team win.

== Promotion Round ==
The top six from the regular season enter the Promotion Round and play each other for the third time. The winner qualifies directly for promotion to Veikkausliiga, whilst the runners-up enter a two-legged playoff against the second to last team in the 2021 Veikkausliiga for promotion.

=== League table ===
Pos	Team	Pld	W	D	L	GF	GA	GD	Pts	Promotion or qualification
1	VPS (C, P)	27	15	6	6	50	30	+20	51	Promotion to the Veikkausliiga
2	RoPS	27	14	6	7	50	36	+14	48	Qualification for the Veikkausliiga play-off
3	TPS	27	13	8	6	40	25	+15	47	
4	FF Jaro	27	12	7	8	39	34	+5	43	
5	EIF	27	10	7	10	45	38	+7	37	
6	Gnistan	27	10	3	14	36	44	−8	33	

Source: Soccerway
Rules for classification: 1) Points; 2) Goal difference; 3) Goals scored; 4) Head-to-head points; 5) Head-to-head goal difference; 6) Head-to-head away goals scored; 7) Play-off
(Note: Play-off is only played if need to decide champion, teams for relegation or UEFA competition and will be played on a neutral ground).
(C) Champions; (P) Promoted

=== Results ===
Home \ Away	EIF	JAR	GNS	RPS	TPS	VPS
EIF	—	0–1	2–0	—	—	—
FF Jaro	—	—	2–0	3–6	—	—
Gnistan	—	—	—	—	1–2	1–4
RoPS	1–2	—	3–4	—	1–0	—
TPS	1–1	4–1	—	—	—	1–3
VPS	2–0	0–1	—	2–0	—	—

Source: Soccerway
Legend: Blue = home team win; Yellow = draw; Red = away team win.

== Relegation Round ==
The bottom six from the regular season enter the Relegation Round and play each other for the third time. The bottom three sides are relegated to the Kakkonen.

=== League table ===
Pos	Team	Pld	W	D	L	GF	GA	GD	Pts	Relegation
1	KPV	27	11	8	8	35	30	+5	41	
2	PK-35	27	11	6	10	34	37	−3	39	
3	MP	27	8	7	12	39	44	−5	31	
4	Klubi 04 (R)	27	9	2	16	39	42	−3	29	Relegation to the Kakkonen
5	MuSa (R)	27	6	9	12	30	55	−25	27	Relegation to the Kakkonen
6	JIPPO (R)	27	7	3	17	18	40	−22	24	Relegation to the Kakkonen

Source: Soccerway
Rules for classification: 1) Points; 2) Goal difference; 3) Goals scored; 4) Head-to-head points; 5) Head-to-head goal difference; 6) Head-to-head away goals scored; 7) Play-off
(Note: Play-off is only played if need to decide champion, teams for relegation or UEFA competition and will be played on a neutral ground).
(R) Relegated

=== Results ===
Home \ Away	JIP	KLU	KPV	MIP	MUA	PKK
JIPPO	—	0–6	—	—	—	2–0
Klubi 04	—	—	1–2	2–0	—	—
KPV	1–0	—	—	2–1	4–1	—
MP	2–0	—	—	—	5–2	2–3
MuSa	3–1	0–3	—	—	—	—
PK-35	—	2–1	2–0	—	1–2	—

Source: Soccerway
Legend: Blue = home team win; Yellow = draw; Red = away team win.
