= 1987 Ykkönen – Finnish League Division 1 =

Finnish League Division 1
- Season: 1987
- Champions: OTP Oulu
- Promoted: OTP Oulu
- Relegated: LauTP Lappeenranta; KaPa Kajaani; Huima Äänekoski

League table for teams participating in Ykkönen, the second tier of the Finnish Soccer League system, in 1987.

== League table ==
Pos	Team	Pld	W	D	L	GF	GA	GD	Pts
1	OTP Oulu	22	12	6	4	42	21	+21	30
2	GrIFK Kauniainen	22	13	3	6	42	22	+20	29
3	KontU Helsinki	22	12	4	6	45	25	+20	28
4	Elo Kuopio	22	11	4	7	40	22	+18	26
5	KPV Kokkola	22	11	4	7	38	31	+7	26
6	MyPa Anjalankoski	22	8	6	8	36	34	+2	22
7	FinnPa Helsinki	22	8	6	8	30	38	−8	22
8	TPV Tampere	22	9	3	10	45	42	+3	21
9	VaKP Valkeakoski	22	8	5	9	32	47	−15	21
10	LauTP Lappeenranta	22	6	5	11	24	38	−14	17
11	KaPa Kajaani	22	5	5	12	20	33	−13	15
12	Huima Äänekoski	22	1	5	16	18	59	−41	7

== Promotion/relegation playoff ==
- GrIFK Kauniainen - KePS Kemi 0-2
- KePS Kemi - GrIFK Kauniainen 5-2

KePS Kemi stayed in Premier Division.

== See also ==
- Mestaruussarja (Tier 1)
