= Lawrence Smith (soccer) =

American soccer player

Personal information
- Date of birth: March 16, 1985 (age 41)
- Place of birth: Charleston, South Carolina, United States
- Height: 1.85 m (6 ft 1 in)
- Position: Forward

Team information
- Current team: GBK
- Number: 3

Senior career*
Years	Team	Apps	(Gls)
2006	Charleston Battery		
2006	Harbour View		
2007–2008	KPV	25	(4)
2009	VPS	22	(3)
2011–	GBK	186	(60)
- * Club domestic league appearances and goals as of 27 June 2020

Lawrence Smith (born March 16, 1985) is an American soccer player, who plays for GBK.
