= 2010 Kakkonen – Finnish League Division 2 =

Finnish League Division 2
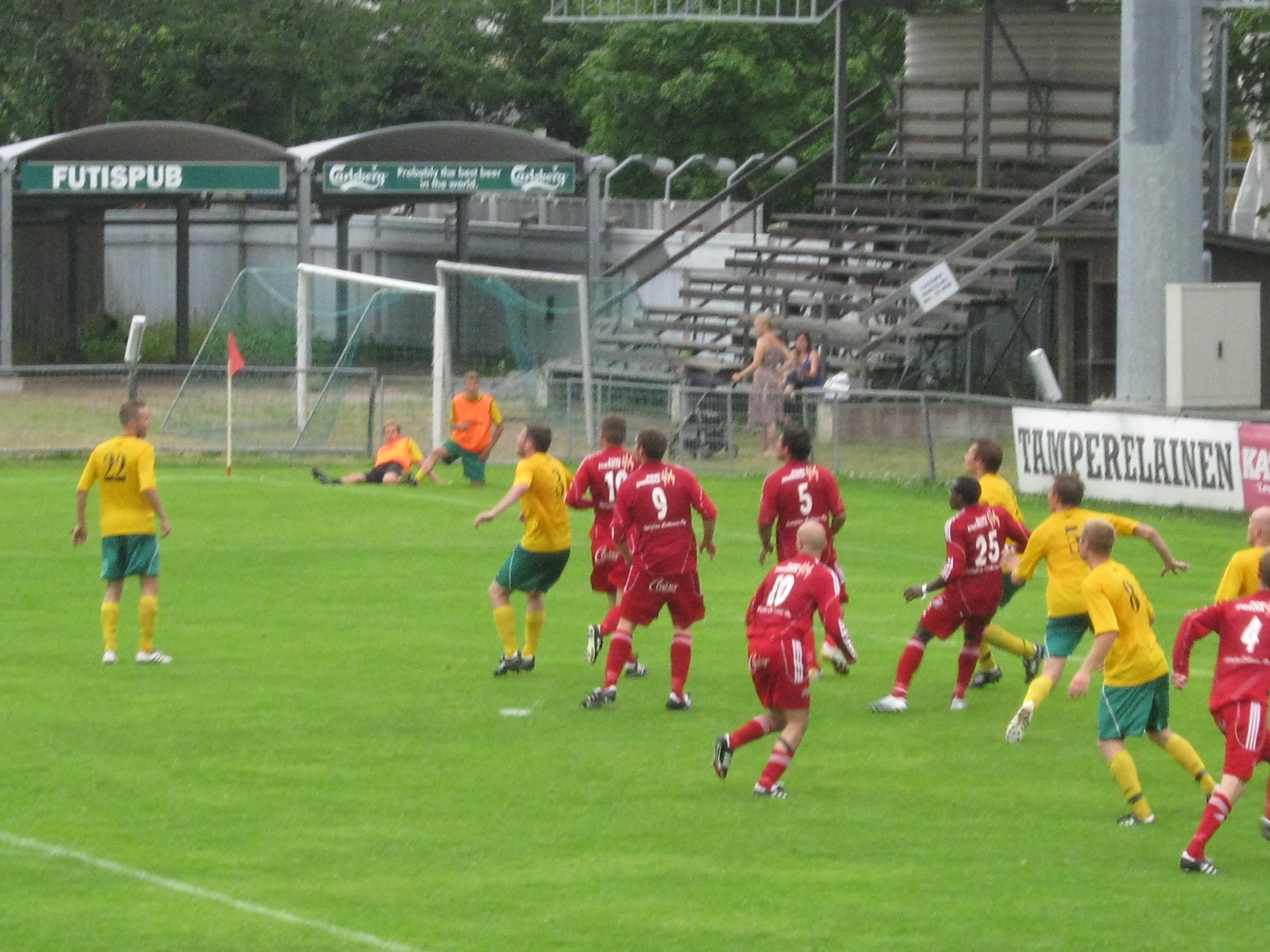
- Ilves vs FC Jazz, Tampere, Finland, 2010.
- Season: 2010
- Champions: HIFK; Ilves; FC Santa Claus
- Promoted: HIFK
- Relegated: 11 teams

League tables for teams participating in Kakkonen, the third tier of the Finnish football league system, in 2010.

== League tables ==
=== Group A ===
Pos	Team	Pld	W	D	L	GF	GA	GD	Pts	Qualification or relegation
1	HIFK (P)	26	15	6	5	49	23	+26	51	Qualification to Promotion playoffs
2	FC Kiffen	26	11	11	4	30	18	+12	44	
3	IF Gnistan	26	11	10	5	49	25	+24	43	
4	FC City Stars	26	11	7	8	48	41	+7	40	
5	SC Riverball	26	11	7	8	35	33	+2	40	
6	Atlantis FC	26	11	5	10	41	37	+4	38	
7	LPS	26	11	5	10	48	47	+1	38	
8	FC Futura	26	11	4	11	42	47	−5	37	
9	FC Kuusankoski	26	9	7	10	35	38	−3	34	
10	KäPa	26	8	9	9	41	42	−1	33	
11	Warkaus JK	26	9	6	11	32	42	−10	33	
12	PEPO (R)	26	6	6	14	34	46	−12	24	Relegation to Kolmonen
13	AC Vantaa (R)	26	7	3	16	33	56	−23	24	Relegation to Kolmonen
14	PK Keski-Uusimaa (R)	26	4	8	14	24	46	−22	20	Relegation to Kolmonen

(P) Promoted; (R) Relegated

=== Group B ===
Pos	Team	Pld	W	D	L	GF	GA	GD	Pts	Qualification or relegation
1	Ilves	26	17	4	5	59	32	+27	55	Qualification to Promotion playoffs
2	SalPa	26	16	4	6	50	28	+22	52	
3	GrIFK	26	13	4	9	48	24	+24	43	
4	Pallo-Iirot	26	12	7	7	33	24	+9	43	
5	Pallohonka	26	12	6	8	54	34	+20	42	
6	LoPa	26	10	5	11	44	43	+1	35	
7	ÅIFK	26	10	4	12	38	41	−3	34	
8	BK-46	26	10	4	12	34	38	−4	34	
9	MuSa	26	10	4	12	33	58	−25	34	
10	FC Jazz	26	8	9	9	39	47	−8	33	
11	EIF (R)	26	8	7	11	43	42	+1	31	Relegation to Kolmonen
12	SoVo (R)	26	6	8	12	42	56	−14	26	Relegation to Kolmonen
13	KaaPo (R)	26	6	6	14	38	61	−23	24	Relegation to Kolmonen
14	FC Sinimustat (R)	26	4	8	14	27	54	−27	20	Relegation to Kolmonen

(R) Relegated

=== Group C ===
Pos	Team	Pld	W	D	L	GF	GA	GD	Pts	Qualification or relegation
1	FC Santa Claus	26	16	3	7	47	25	+22	51	Qualification to Promotion playoffs
2	TP-47	26	15	3	8	34	28	+6	48	
3	FC YPA	26	14	5	7	64	40	+24	47	
4	PK-37	26	12	8	6	47	33	+14	44	
5	Seinäjoen JK	26	11	9	6	46	31	+15	42	
6	VIFK	26	11	8	7	46	24	+22	41	
7	GBK	26	11	7	8	46	24	+22	40	
8	FC Kiisto	26	10	9	7	39	33	+6	39	
9	FCV	26	10	8	8	45	45	0	38	
10	JBK	26	9	7	10	37	41	−4	34	
11	FC OPA (R)	26	6	9	11	28	46	−18	27	Relegation to Kolmonen
12	FCJ Blackbird (R)	26	7	3	16	26	42	−16	24	Relegation to Kolmonen
13	KajHa (R)	26	4	9	13	33	52	−19	21	Relegation to Kolmonen
14	FC Korsholm (R)	26	1	2	23	25	89	−64	5	Relegation to Kolmonen

(R) Relegated

== Promotion playoffs ==
- Ilves–HIFK 1–2
- FC Santa Claus–Ilves 5–3
- HIFK–FC Santa Claus 1–0

Pos	Team	Pld	W	D	L	GF	GA	GD	Pts	Promotion
1	HIFK (P)	2	2	0	0	3	1	+2	6	Promotion to Ykkönen
2	FC Santa Claus	2	1	0	1	5	4	+1	3	
3	Ilves	2	0	0	2	4	7	−3	0	

(P) Promoted

== Sources ==
- Finnish FA (Suomen Palloliitto - Kakkonen 2010)
