= 2000 Kakkonen – Finnish League Division 2 =

Finnish League Division 2
- Season: 2000
- Champions: IF Gnistan; FC Kuusankoski; SalPa; TP-47
- Relegated: 12 teams

League Tables for teams participating in Kakkonen, the third tier of the Finnish Soccer League system, in 2000.

== League Tables 2000 ==
=== Southern Group, Etelälohko ===
Pos	Team	Pld	W	D	L	GF	GA	GD	Pts
1	IF Gnistan, Helsinki (C, P)	22	16	5	1	52	21	+31	53
2	AC Vantaa, Vantaa (O)	22	15	3	4	60	26	+34	48
3	PS-44, Valkeakoski	22	11	7	4	39	30	+9	40
4	KäPa, Helsinki	22	11	6	5	56	29	+27	39
5	Kiffen, Helsinki	22	9	8	5	48	30	+18	35
6	PP-70, Tampere	22	9	5	8	41	39	+2	32
7	LePa, Espoo	22	8	7	7	40	38	+2	31
8	HyPS, Hyvinkää	22	6	7	9	40	49	−9	25
9	TP Lahti, Lahti	22	7	1	14	35	52	−17	22
10	KU, Porvoo (R)	22	4	5	13	36	55	−19	17
11	TKT, Tampere (R)	22	3	4	15	29	72	−43	13
12	LoPa, Lohja (R)	22	2	4	16	21	56	−35	10

(C) Champions; (O) Play-off winners; (P) Promoted; (R) Relegated

=== Eastern Group, Itälohko ===
Pos	Team	Pld	W	D	L	GF	GA	GD	Pts
1	FC Kuusankoski, Kuusankoski (C, P)	22	17	4	1	64	19	+45	55
2	WP-35, Varkaus (O)	22	15	5	2	35	15	+20	50
3	Kings, Kuopio	22	13	5	4	43	29	+14	44
4	JJK, Jyväskylä	22	9	5	8	41	29	+12	32
5	KajHa, Kajaani	22	7	9	6	30	26	+4	30
6	SäyRi, Jyväskylä	22	8	3	11	33	39	−6	27
7	JiiPee, Joensuu	22	5	11	6	32	32	0	26
8	Huima, Äänekoski	22	7	5	10	24	25	−1	26
9	Zulimanit, Kuopio	22	5	5	12	23	44	−21	20
10	PK-37, Iisalmi (R)	22	4	7	11	19	47	−28	19
11	MiPa, Mikkeli (R)	22	3	7	12	25	43	−18	16
12	WTP, Varkaus (R)	22	3	6	13	18	39	−21	15

(C) Champions; (O) Play-off winners; (P) Promoted; (R) Relegated

=== Western Group, Länsilohko ===
Pos	Team	Pld	W	D	L	GF	GA	GD	Pts
1	SalPa, Salo (C, P)	22	19	2	1	70	18	+52	59
2	KaaPo, Kaarina (O)	22	12	3	7	53	41	+12	39
3	TPK, Turku	22	10	6	6	52	36	+16	36
4	Ponnistus, Helsinki	22	11	1	10	39	47	−8	34
5	VG-62, Naantali	22	8	8	6	44	32	+12	32
6	MIFK, Mariehamn	22	9	4	9	45	45	0	31
7	KaIK, Kaskinen	22	9	3	10	53	49	+4	30
8	PIF, Pargas	22	8	6	8	31	37	−6	30
9	Ponnistajat, Helsinki	22	8	4	10	35	40	−5	28
10	FC Kontu, Helsinki (R)	22	8	3	11	44	43	+1	27
11	VJS, Vantaa (R)	22	4	5	13	32	64	−32	17
12	EuPa, Eura (R)	22	3	1	18	33	79	−46	10

(C) Champions; (O) Play-off winners; (P) Promoted; (R) Relegated

=== Northern Group, Pohjoislohko ===
Pos	Team	Pld	W	D	L	GF	GA	GD	Pts
1	TP-47, Tornio (C, P)	22	19	0	3	66	20	+46	57
2	JBK, Jakobstad (O)	22	14	2	6	54	33	+21	44
3	FC Korsholm, Korsholm	22	12	1	9	65	38	+27	37
4	GBK, Kokkola	22	11	3	8	38	27	+11	36
5	OLS, Oulu	22	12	0	10	44	37	+7	36
6	KPV-j, Kokkola	22	9	6	7	49	47	+2	33
7	FC Kiisto, Vaasa	22	9	5	8	39	39	0	32
8	FC Santa Claus, Rovaniemi	22	7	5	10	37	42	−5	26
9	NIK, Nykarleby	22	8	2	12	33	50	−17	26
10	BK-IFK, Vaasa (R)	22	7	4	11	33	38	−5	25
11	HauPa, Haukipudas (R)	22	4	2	16	30	66	−36	14
12	Virkiä, Lapua (R)	22	3	4	15	20	71	−51	13

(C) Champions; (O) Play-off winners; (P) Promoted; (R) Relegated

=== Promotion Playoffs ===
- WP-35 – AC Vantaa 1–1
- AC Vantaa – WP-35 2–0

AC Vantaa won 3–1 on aggregate.

- JBK – KaaPo 1–1
- KaaPo – JBK 0–5

JBK won 6–1 on aggregate.

- AC Vantaa – Rakuunat, Lappeenranta 0–0
- Rakuunat, Lappeenranta – AC Vantaa 2–0

Rakuunat won 2–0 on aggregate and retained their place in the Ykkönen.

- JBK, Jakobstad – Närpes Kraft 0–3
- Närpes Kraft – JBK Jakobstad 0–1

Närpes Kraft won 3–1 on aggregate and retained their place in the Ykkönen

== Leading goal scorers ==
Etelälohko

- 31 - Tommi Uusitalo AC Vantaa
- 21 - Jukka Suikki IF Gnistan
- 13 - Juha Hämäläinen LePa
- 13 - Jon Poulsen KäPa

Itälohko

- 15 - Jani Uotinen FC Kuusankoski
- 14 - Arto Lautamatti FC Kuusankoski
- 14 - Kimmo Pöyhönen Kings
- 11 - Tuomo Holmberg JJK

Länsilohko

- 24 - Kimmo Piirainen SalPa
- 17 - Lembit Rajala MIFK
- 15 - Pekka Riikonen Ponnistus

Pohjoislohko

- 19 - Niklas Blomqvist FC Korsholm
- 18 - Oleg Dulub TP-47
- 17 - Pekka Kainu KPV-j

== References and sources ==
- Finnish FA, Suomen Palloliitto
- Kakkonen (in Finnish)
