= Pekka Kainu =

Finnish footballer (born 1979)

Personal information
- Date of birth: 20 December 1979 (age 46)
- Place of birth: Veteli, Finland
- Height: 1.81 m (5 ft 11 1/2 in)
- Position: Forward

Senior career*
Years	Team	Apps	(Gls)
2000–2001	KPV Kokkola		
2002–2003	GBK Kokkola		
2004–2005	Tornion Pallo -47	51	(17)
2006–2008	FC Lahti	68	(9)
2009–2010	Vaasan Palloseura	45	(8)
2011–2012	Oulun Palloseura	46	(9)
- * Club domestic league appearances and goals as of 2 May 2013

Pekka Kainu (born 20 December 1979) is a Finnish footballer.
