= Kokkola Areena =

Sports venue in Kokkola, Finland

- Interactive map of Kokkola Areena
- Full name: Kokkolan Areena (Kokkola Arena)
- Location: Kokkola, Finland
- Coordinates: 63°50′39″N 23°7′56″E
- Owner: Kokkola City
- Capacity: 3,000
- Surface: Heated artificial turf
- Field size: 105 x 68 meters

Construction
- Groundbreaking: 2023
- Opened: 2026; 0 years ago

Tenants
- KPV; GBK Kokkola men GBK Kokkola women Kokkola Futis 10

Website
- https://kokkolaareena.fi/

Kokkola Areena is a multi-purpose arena located in Kokkola, Finland, with a capacity of 3,000. The arena complex includes a football stadium, facilities for martial arts, indoor football fields, an indoor running track, tennis courts, gymnastics facilities and a gym. It is the home ground of KPV and GBK Kokkola.

== History ==
In the inaugural match at Kokkola's arena on Thursday, May 14, 2026, GBK Kokkola women were defeated by SJK women 0–5 in the third round of the Finnish Cup.
