= 2007 Kolmonen – Finnish League Division 3 =

Finnish League Division 3
- Season: 2007
- Champions: BK-46 (not promoted); HIFK Soccer; PK Keski-Uusimaa; KTP; Huima; Zulimanit (not promoted); FC OPA; GBK II (not promoted); VPS Juniorit; PoPa Mukava; FJK; ÅIFK
- Promoted: 9 teams above

League tables for teams participating in Kolmonen, the fourth tier of the Finnish soccer league system, in 2007.

== League Tables 2007 ==
=== Helsinki and Uusimaa ===
==== Section 1 ====
Pos	Team	Pld	W	D	L	GF	GA	GD	Pts
1	BK-46, Karjaa (C)	22	13	6	3	57	20	+37	45
2	FC HIK, Hanko	22	13	2	7	48	29	+19	41
3	FC Honka 2, Espoo	22	12	4	6	58	21	+37	40
4	Allianssi Vantaa	22	12	3	7	57	34	+23	39
5	Pöxyt, Espoo	22	12	3	7	49	34	+15	39
6	EsPa, Espoo	22	11	3	8	42	42	0	36
7	PMP EJ, Espoo	22	8	4	10	46	57	−11	28
8	FC Espoo 2	22	8	2	12	27	43	−16	26
9	NuPS edustus, Nummela	22	7	4	11	31	46	−15	25
10	EBK, Espoo	22	7	4	11	39	58	−19	25
11	NJS, Nurmijärvi (R)	22	6	4	12	36	54	−18	22
12	FC Lohja (R)	22	3	1	18	20	72	−52	10

(C) Champions; (R) Relegated

==== Section 2 ====
Pos	Team	Pld	W	D	L	GF	GA	GD	Pts
1	HIFK Soccer, Helsinki (C, O, P)	22	19	1	2	85	15	+70	58
2	Kiffen, Helsinki	22	16	3	3	61	24	+37	51
3	JäPS, Järvenpää	22	16	3	3	66	19	+47	51
4	FC POHU, Helsinki	22	10	2	10	38	43	−5	32
5	PuiU/3, Helsinki	22	10	1	11	38	59	−21	31
6	RIlves, Riihimäki	22	10	0	12	30	48	−18	30
7	MaKu, Helsinki	22	9	2	11	29	34	−5	29
8	PPV, Helsinki	22	8	5	9	43	34	+9	29
9	SAPA, Helsinki	22	6	6	10	23	30	−7	24
10	FC Degis, Helsinki	22	7	2	13	27	59	−32	23
11	TuPS, Tuusula (R)	22	5	2	15	36	62	−26	17
12	HerTo, Helsinki (R)	22	1	3	18	24	73	−49	6

(C) Champions; (O) Play-off winners; (P) Promoted; (R) Relegated

==== Section 3 ====
Pos	Team	Pld	W	D	L	GF	GA	GD	Pts
1	PK Keski-Uusimaa, Kerava (C, P)	22	16	5	1	70	16	+54	53
2	AC Vantaa	22	14	4	4	73	32	+41	46
3	Futura, Porvoo	22	11	2	9	58	35	+23	35
4	PK-35 2, Helsinki	22	10	4	8	56	37	+19	34
5	Gnistan Ogeli, Helsinki	22	10	4	8	38	40	−2	34
6	Ponnistus, Helsinki	22	10	2	10	46	33	+13	32
7	FC Viikingit/2, Helsinki	22	8	5	9	33	41	−8	29
8	MPS 2, Helsinki	22	8	3	11	49	55	−6	27
9	Stars, Lahti	22	8	3	11	27	47	−20	27
10	Akilles, Porvoo	22	6	5	11	36	52	−16	23
11	FC Kontu Arctic, Helsinki (R)	22	7	2	13	33	51	−18	23
12	IVU, Vantaa (R)	22	4	1	17	18	98	−80	13

(C) Champions; (P) Promoted; (R) Relegated

==== Play-off ====
HIFK Soccer 3-0 ÅIFK

=== South-East Finland (Kaakkois-Suomi) ===
Pos	Team	Pld	W	D	L	GF	GA	GD	Pts
1	KTP, Kotka (C, P)	22	17	3	2	81	24	+57	54
2	Kultsu FC, Joutseno	22	12	7	3	52	29	+23	43
3	Purha, Inkeroinen	22	13	3	6	72	43	+29	42
4	SavU, Mikkeli	22	13	2	7	69	39	+30	41
5	PEPO, Lappeenranta	22	10	6	6	56	33	+23	36
6	HP-47, Heinola	22	10	3	9	44	41	+3	33
7	VoPpK, Voikkaa	22	8	5	9	47	42	+5	29
8	SiU, Simpele	22	7	6	9	31	33	−2	27
9	STPS, Savonlinna	22	8	2	12	42	57	−15	26
10	VKajo, Valkeala	22	6	5	11	39	50	−11	23
11	HaPK, Hamina	22	4	1	17	23	61	−38	13
12	RPS, Ruokolahti (R)	22	1	3	18	21	125	−104	6

(C) Champions; (P) Promoted; (R) Relegated

=== Central Finland (Keski-Suomi) ===
Pos	Team	Pld	W	D	L	GF	GA	GD	Pts
1	Huima, Äänekoski (C, P)	20	17	3	0	73	7	+66	54
2	BET, Jyväskylä	20	14	4	2	67	21	+46	46
3	JIlves, Jämsänkoski	20	10	5	5	34	36	−2	35
4	FC Keitelejazz, Äänekoski	20	10	4	6	55	40	+15	34
5	PaRi, Palokka	20	10	2	8	63	49	+14	32
6	FCV, Vaajakoski	20	8	6	6	45	35	+10	30
7	JPS, Jyävskylä	20	7	3	10	43	37	+6	24
8	LPK, Jyväskylä	20	6	3	11	32	46	−14	21
9	SäyRi, Säynätsalo	20	5	5	10	30	36	−6	20
10	HPP, Haapamäki	20	3	2	15	27	69	−42	11
11	Pamaus, Laukaa (R)	20	1	1	18	18	111	−93	4

(C) Champions; (P) Promoted; (R) Relegated

=== Eastern Finland (Itä-Suomi) ===
Pos	Team	Pld	W	D	L	GF	GA	GD	Pts
1	Zulimanit, Kuopio (C)	20	17	2	1	83	19	+64	53
2	PK-37, Iisalmi	20	17	1	2	78	8	+70	52
3	SC Riverball, Joensuu	20	14	3	3	80	18	+62	45
4	PAVE, Iisalmi	20	11	3	6	46	27	+19	36
5	SiPS, Siilinjärvi	20	9	2	9	43	46	−3	29
6	SC KuFu-98, Kuopio	20	9	1	10	50	51	−1	28
7	LehPa, Kontiolahti	20	7	5	8	41	37	+4	26
8	JoPS, Joensuu	20	6	1	13	41	75	−34	19
9	JIPPO/2, Joensuu	20	5	1	14	23	55	−32	16
10	Warkaus JK/2, Varkaus	20	4	3	13	26	59	−33	15
11	OuPa, Outokumpu	20	0	0	20	10	126	−116	0

(C) Champions

=== Northern Finland (Pohjois-Suomi) ===
Pos	Team	Pld	W	D	L	GF	GA	GD	Pts
1	FC OPA, Oulu (C, P)	20	13	2	5	60	27	+33	41
2	AC Kajaani, Kajaani	20	12	2	6	51	26	+25	38
3	FC Santa Claus, Rovaniemi	20	11	5	4	54	40	+14	38
4	TP-47/2, Tornio	20	10	4	6	48	26	+22	34
5	Tervarit, Oulu	20	9	4	7	52	47	+5	31
6	HauPa, Haukipudas	20	9	3	8	39	31	+8	30
7	OuTa, Oulu	20	9	2	9	31	45	−14	29
8	FC Rio Grande, Rovaniemi	20	6	6	8	35	41	−6	24
9	OLS Akatemia, Oulu	20	6	4	10	42	45	−3	22
10	KemPa, Keminmaa (R)	20	4	5	11	36	68	−32	17
11	FC Raahe (R)	20	2	1	17	35	87	−52	7

(C) Champions; (P) Promoted; (R) Relegated

=== Central Ostrobothnia (Keski-Pohjanmaa) ===
Pos	Team	Pld	W	D	L	GF	GA	GD	Pts
1	GBK II, Kokkola (C)	22	16	4	2	55	21	+34	52
2	TUS, Kronoby (P)	22	15	3	4	66	25	+41	48
3	Öja-73, Kokkola	22	13	3	6	70	30	+40	42
4	FF Jaro II, Jakobstad	22	12	2	8	39	26	+13	38
5	IK Myran, Alaveteli	22	10	7	5	45	31	+14	37
6	NIK, Uusikaarlepyy	22	10	4	8	36	30	+6	34
7	Esse IK, Pedersöre	22	9	2	11	38	38	0	29
8	No Stars, Kokkola	22	7	4	11	31	65	−34	25
9	FC YPA II, Ylivieska	22	7	3	12	27	36	−9	24
10	KP-V, Kaustinen	22	6	5	11	35	47	−12	23
11	Reima, Kokkola (O)	22	4	3	15	26	72	−46	15
12	PeFF, Pedersöre (R)	22	2	2	18	24	71	−47	8

(C) Champions; (O) Play-off winners; (P) Promoted; (R) Relegated

=== Vaasa ===
Pos	Team	Pld	W	D	L	GF	GA	GD	Pts
1	VPS Juniorit, Vaasa (C, P)	20	18	2	0	94	21	+73	56
2	VIFK Young Boys, Vaasa	20	11	4	5	39	25	+14	37
3	Sporting, Kristiinankaupunki	20	11	2	7	56	26	+30	35
4	FC Korsholm	20	10	4	6	45	29	+16	34
5	Karhu, Kauhajoki	20	9	3	8	67	56	+11	30
6	NuPa, Nurmo	20	8	3	9	48	63	−15	27
7	Virkiä, Lapua	20	7	3	10	29	38	−9	24
8	FC KOMU, Mustasaari	20	6	5	9	36	46	−10	23
9	VäVi, Vähäkyrö	20	6	2	12	32	54	−22	20
10	IK, Ilmajoki	20	5	0	15	24	62	−38	15
11	TePa, Teuva	20	5	0	15	32	82	−50	15

(C) Champions; (P) Promoted

=== Satakunta ===
Pos	Team	Pld	W	D	L	GF	GA	GD	Pts
1	PoPa Mukava, Pori (C)	18	14	1	3	52	23	+29	43
2	EuPa, Eura	18	11	4	3	41	15	+26	37
3	FC Rauma	18	12	1	5	38	28	+10	37
4	P-Iirot2, Rauma	18	9	2	7	45	31	+14	29
5	KoPa, Kokemäki	18	9	2	7	36	27	+9	29
6	TOVE, Pori	18	8	3	7	37	29	+8	27
7	MuSa2, Pori	18	6	1	11	29	40	−11	19
8	RuosV, Pori	18	4	2	12	23	46	−23	14
9	FC Ulvila	18	4	2	12	21	45	−24	14
10	Nasta, Nakkila (R)	18	3	2	13	32	70	−38	11

(C) Champions; (R) Relegated

=== Tampere ===
Pos	Team	Pld	W	D	L	GF	GA	GD	Pts
1	FJK, Forssa (C, P)	26	16	4	6	65	27	+38	52
2	PJK, Pirkkala	26	15	7	4	70	34	+36	52
3	Härmä, Hämeenlinna	26	14	7	5	83	39	+44	49
4	FC Tigers, Tampere	26	15	3	8	64	38	+26	48
5	NoPS, Nokia	26	13	6	7	53	46	+7	45
6	VaKP, Valkeakoski	26	13	4	9	65	59	+6	43
7	Pato, Tervakoski	26	11	6	9	45	42	+3	39
8	TP-49, Toijala	26	12	0	14	52	64	−12	36
9	Loiske, Lempäälä	26	10	5	11	54	60	−6	35
10	PS-44, Valkeakoski (O)	26	10	4	12	48	80	−32	34
11	KaVo, Kangasala (R)	26	7	5	14	37	45	−8	26
12	TKT, Tampere (R)	26	6	5	15	38	49	−11	23
13	LaVe, Lammi (R)	26	5	5	16	32	76	−44	20
14	YlöR, Ylöjärvi (R)	26	2	5	19	31	78	−47	11

(C) Champions; (O) Play-off winners; (P) Promoted; (R) Relegated

=== Turku and Åland (Turku and Ahvenanmaa) ===
Pos	Team	Pld	W	D	L	GF	GA	GD	Pts
1	ÅIFK, Turku (C, O, P)	22	19	2	1	115	15	+100	59
2	TuTo, Turku	22	15	4	3	67	20	+47	49
3	LTU, Littoinen	22	13	4	5	50	45	+5	43
4	FC Boda, Dragsfjärd	22	9	5	8	41	34	+7	32
5	Wilpas, Salo	22	8	6	8	30	35	−5	30
6	VG-62 2, Naantali	22	8	5	9	30	44	−14	29
7	PIF, Pargas	22	8	4	10	34	36	−2	28
8	TPK, Turku	22	8	3	11	36	41	−5	27
9	SCR, Raisio	22	7	5	10	29	38	−9	26
10	JyTy, Turku	22	7	4	11	35	57	−22	25
11	HammIK, Hammarland (R)	22	3	7	12	22	56	−34	16
12	TPK 2, Turku (R)	22	1	3	18	15	83	−68	6

(C) Champions; (O) Play-off winners; (P) Promoted; (R) Relegated

== References and sources ==
- Finnish FA
- ResultCode
- Kolmonen (jalkapallo) (in Finnish)
