= 1968 Mestaruussarja =

Mestaruussarja
- Season: 1968
- Champions: TPS Turku
- Relegated: Ponnistus Helsinki, VPS Vaasa

Statistics of Mestaruussarja in the 1968 season.

== Overview ==
It was contested by 12 teams, and TPS Turku won the championship.

== League standings ==
Pos	Team	Pld	W	D	L	GF	GA	GD	Pts
1	TPS Turku (C)	22	14	4	4	48	19	+29	32
2	Reipas Lahti	22	11	8	3	45	31	+14	30
3	HJK Helsinki	22	11	7	4	51	33	+18	29
4	KuPS Kuopio	22	11	3	8	39	29	+10	25
5	KPV Kokkola	22	8	7	7	41	33	+8	23
6	Upon Pallo Lahti	22	10	2	10	41	38	+3	22
7	Haka Valkeakoski	22	7	8	7	31	30	+1	22
8	MP Mikkeli	22	9	4	9	38	42	−4	22
9	KTP Kotka	22	7	5	10	35	42	−7	19
10	Ässät Pori	22	6	5	11	38	59	−21	17
11	Ponnistus Helsinki (R)	22	5	3	14	28	53	−25	13
12	VPS Vaasa (R)	22	2	6	14	14	40	−26	10

Source: rsssf.com
(C) Champions; (R) Relegated

== Results ==
Home \ Away	HAK	HJK	KPV	KTP	KPS	MP	PON	REI	TPS	UP	VPS	ÄSS
FC Haka		1–1	4–1	1–0	0–2	0–0	2–1	2–2	0–3	4–2	1–1	1–1
HJK Helsinki	2–0		2–1	0–1	5–1	4–2	0–0	7–1	1–6	1–1	2–0	2–2
KPV	2–4	4–2		2–2	3–1	7–1	3–2	2–2	2–2	2–0	0–0	3–1
KTP	3–1	0–0	0–0		2–0	2–5	2–5	1–4	1–1	2–3	2–1	6–2
KuPS	1–0	1–4	1–0	4–2		2–1	5–0	1–2	0–1	1–0	2–0	3–0
MP	0–0	3–1	4–0	0–3	1–3		6–0	0–0	0–1	4–1	0–0	4–2
Ponnistus	1–0	2–3	2–2	3–1	0–7	1–2		0–4	1–1	0–1	2–0	2–3
Reipas	2–2	2–2	0–0	1–2	0–0	3–1	2–1		1–0	2–2	3–1	3–1
TPS	1–0	1–3	0–2	2–0	3–0	6–0	2–0	3–2		3–1	0–0	5–1
UPallo	0–1	1–2	2–1	2–0	3–2	4–0	3–2	2–4	3–2		5–0	2–0
VPS	0–3	2–6	1–0	1–1	1–1	0–1	0–2	1–2	1–2	1–0		2–3
Ässät	4–4	1–1	0–4	4–2	1–1	2–3	4–1	0–3	0–3	4–3	2–1	

Legend: Blue = home team win; Yellow = draw; Red = away team win.
