= 1986 Ykkönen – Finnish League Division 1 =

Finnish League Division 1
- Season: 1986
- Champions: Reipas Lahti
- Promoted: Reipas Lahti
- Relegated: Jaro Pietarsaari; KajHa Kajaani; PK-37 Iisalmi

League table for teams participating in Ykkönen, the second tier of the Finnish Soccer League system, in 1986.

== League table ==
Pos	Team	Pld	W	D	L	GF	GA	GD	Pts
1	Reipas Lahti	22	13	7	2	40	20	+20	33
2	KontU Helsinki	22	9	10	3	27	20	+7	28
3	TPV Tampere	22	10	8	4	52	34	+18	28
4	Elo Kuopio	22	7	9	6	28	36	−8	23
5	KPV Kokkola	22	5	12	5	22	20	+2	22
6	LauTP Lappeenranta	22	8	6	8	34	34	0	22
7	FinnPa Helsinki	22	7	6	9	32	32	0	20
8	Huima Äänekoski	22	6	8	8	34	36	−2	20
9	MyPa Anjalankoski	22	7	5	10	35	37	−2	19
10	Jaro Pietarsaari	22	5	9	8	23	23	0	19
11	KajHa Kajaani	22	7	3	12	32	43	−11	17
12	PK-37 Iisalmi	22	4	5	13	24	48	−24	13

=== Promotion/relegation playoff ===
- KontU Helsinki - KePS Kemi 3-4
- KePS Kemi - KontU Helsinki 3-2

KePS Kemi stayed in Premier Division.

== See also ==
- Mestaruussarja (Tier 1)
