= Jarmo Manninen =

Finnish footballer (born 1951)

Personal information
- Date of birth: 11 March 1951
- Place of birth: Pori, Finland
- Height: 1.80 m (5 ft 11 in)
- Position: Forward

Senior career*
Years	Team	Apps	(Gls)
1968	Karhut	–	(6)
1969–1970	Ässät	–	(15)
1971	Ilves-Kissat	25	(9)
1972–1974	Ässät	–	(44)
1975–1978	TPS Turku	85	(38)
1979–1980	Ässät	–	(14)
1982–1985	PPT Pori	75	(18)

International career
1973–1975	Finland	8	(2)
- * Club domestic league appearances and goals

Jarmo Manninen (born 11 March 1951) is a Finnish former footballer. He capped eight times for the Finland national team.

== International goals ==
International Goals
#	Date	Venue	Opponent	Score	Result	Competition
1.	6 June 1973	Tampere, Finland	East Germany	1–5	1–5	World Cup Qualifier
2.	18 June 1975	Stavanger, Norway	Norway	0–1	1–1	Olympic Qualifier

== Career honors ==
- Finnish Championship: 1975
