= 2006 Kakkonen – Finnish League Division 2 =

Sportseason of a football competition

Finnish League Division 2
- Season: 2006
- Champions: JJK Jyväskylä; TPV; GBK
- Promoted: Above teams
- Relegated: 9 teams

League tables for teams participating in Kakkonen, the third tier of the Finnish football league system, in 2006.

== League tables ==
=== Group A, East ===
Pos	Team	Pld	W	D	L	GF	GA	GD	Pts	Promotion or relegation
1	JJK Jyväskylä (C, P)	26	15	7	4	53	20	+33	52	Promotion to Ykkönen
2	HyPS, Hyvinkää	26	14	6	6	51	28	+23	48	
3	Kings, Kuopio	26	13	6	7	45	29	+16	45	
4	Gnistan, Helsinki	26	14	3	9	54	40	+14	45	
5	KäPa, Helsinki	26	13	3	10	49	34	+15	42	
6	Warkaus JK	26	11	7	8	42	37	+5	40	
7	KuPS Akatemia, Kuopio	26	12	4	10	46	46	0	40	
8	LPS, Helsinki	26	12	1	13	50	49	+1	37	
9	FC Kontu, Helsinki	26	11	3	12	41	44	−3	36	
10	MPS, Helsinki	26	10	5	11	45	53	−8	35	
11	FC Kuusankoski	26	9	7	10	47	37	+10	34	
12	Huima, Äänekoski (R)	26	8	7	11	35	56	−21	31	Relegation to Kolmonen
13	FC Vaajakoski (R)	26	6	4	16	29	52	−23	22	Relegation to Kolmonen
14	Ponnistus, Helsinki (R)	26	1	3	22	15	77	−62	6	Relegation to Kolmonen

(C) Champions; (P) Promoted; (R) Relegated

NB: JJK II (promoted from Division Three) withdrew and Ponnistus took their place.

=== Group B, West ===
Pos	Team	Pld	W	D	L	GF	GA	GD	Pts	Promotion or relegation
1	TPV, Tampere (C, P)	26	18	7	1	52	16	+36	61	Promotion to Ykkönen
2	SalPa, Salo	26	16	6	4	55	23	+32	54	
3	PoPa, Pori	26	13	7	6	64	32	+32	46	
4	KaaPo, Kaarina	26	14	4	8	57	46	+11	46	
5	FC Espoo	26	12	3	11	54	46	+8	39	
6	P-Iirot, Rauma	26	11	6	9	35	30	+5	39	
7	VG-62, Naantali	26	11	3	12	35	39	−4	36	
8	EIF, Tammisaari	26	9	4	13	53	46	+7	31	
9	GrIFK, Kauniainen	26	9	4	13	39	46	−7	31	
10	Masku	26	8	6	12	29	38	−9	30	
11	SoVo, Somero	26	8	6	12	39	54	−15	30	
12	TKT, Tampere (R)	26	7	5	14	30	41	−11	26	Relegation to Kolmonen
13	PIF, Parainen (R)	26	4	11	11	24	47	−23	23	Relegation to Kolmonen
14	PS-44, Valkeakoski (R)	26	4	4	18	18	80	−62	16	Relegation to Kolmonen

(C) Champions; (P) Promoted; (R) Relegated

=== Group C, North ===
Pos	Team	Pld	W	D	L	GF	GA	GD	Pts	Promotion or relegation
1	GBK, Kokkola (C, P)	26	20	2	4	66	21	+45	62	Promotion to Ykkönen
2	PS Kemi	26	15	8	3	66	25	+41	53	
3	JBK, Pietarsaari	26	15	3	8	53	35	+18	48	
4	OLS, Oulu	26	12	7	7	46	31	+15	43	
5	TP-Seinäjoki	26	13	3	10	55	43	+12	42	
6	Närpes Kraft, Närpiö	26	12	4	10	40	37	+3	40	
7	FC YPA, Ylivieska	26	11	7	8	41	41	0	40	
8	Sepsi-78, Seinäjoki	26	11	5	10	35	29	+6	38	
9	FC Kiisto, Vaasa	26	10	5	11	45	43	+2	35	
10	FC Lynx, Rovaniemi	26	9	7	10	51	52	−1	34	
11	OPS-jp, Oulu	26	8	5	13	40	42	−2	29	
12	FC Korsholm, Mustasaari (R)	26	6	6	14	32	58	−26	24	Relegation to Kolmonen
13	TUS, Teerijärvi (R)	26	6	5	15	34	64	−30	23	Relegation to Kolmonen
14	Virkiä, Lapua (R)	26	0	1	25	15	98	−83	1	Relegation to Kolmonen

(C) Champions; (P) Promoted; (R) Relegated

== References and sources ==
- Finnish FA, Suomen Palloliitto
