= Kokkolan Palloveikot =

Association football club

KPV
- Full name: Kokkolan Palloveikot (Kokkola Ball Friends)
- Founded: 1930; 96 years ago
- Ground: Kokkola Areena
- Capacity: 3,000
- Chairman: Jouko Vierimaa
- Manager: Niko Kalliokoski
- League: Kakkonen
- 2026: Ykkönen, 11th of 12 (relegated)
- Website: https://kpv.fi/
Home colours	Away colours

Kokkolan Palloveikot (KPV) is a Finnish football club based in Kokkola. It currently plays in Ykkönen, the third-highest level in Finnish football. The club plays its home matches at Kokkola Areena.

== History ==
KPV is a football club from the town of Kokkola. The rival club is Swedish-speaking GBK.

KPV runs several teams, including 1 men's team, 1 women's team, 10 boys teams and 7 girls teams. The club also runs an academy and Soccer School.

=== 1930s ===
The first decade for Pallo-Veikot was characterised by a search for its own identity and the establishment of a solid foundation. Notably, under the circumstances of the time, KPV had already incorporated junior activities into its program by 1938. Records indicate team lineups, with names such as Olli Dahlström (Telimaa) and Jukka Uunila emerging from the B-junior team.

=== 1940s ===
The 1940s were marked by the war years and the subsequent recovery from their impacts. KPV focused primarily on junior activities during the first half of the decade, with notable figures such as future governor Antti Pohjonen among its ranks. By the club’s 20th year of operation, KPV had assembled a team strong enough to gain recognition even in southern Finland, with Helsinki-based clubs showing interest in its players. The team competed for top positions in the then-Suomisarja.

=== 1950s ===
The following decade can be described as steady but unremarkable. There were ups and downs, with the team even dropping to the regional league at times, though talented individuals stood out. Hannu Vainio, perhaps the most prominent, was part of the national team selection. Toward the end of the decade, youth development began yielding results at the national level, as the A-juniors secured their first Finnish Championship medals—bronze—in 1956 in Kokkola.

=== 1960s ===
The promise of the previous decades came to fruition in the 1960s. The early years of the decade instilled in some Pallo-Veikot members the realisation that the status quo was insufficient and that the fruits of their youth development efforts should be reaped. A strong sense of camaraderie and resolute decision-making led to promotion to the Finnish Championship League in the autumn of 1966. This was followed by an impressive run for the A-juniors: bronze in 1965, Finnish Championship title in 1967, silver in 1968, and another championship title in 1969. These achievements provided ample evidence that by 1969, the young players had matured into men capable of winning the Finnish Championship.

=== 1970s ===
The club’s robust junior program continued to bear fruit into the following decades. The senior team added to its trophy collection with a Finnish Championship silver and two bronze medals during the 1970s. The A-juniors secured bronze in 1974, while the youth team earned bronze in 1975, when championships were still contested on smaller fields. Junior players also excelled in national skill competitions. KPV produced medal-winning players nearly every year, and in its best year, the youth national team included a core group of up to five KPV players.

=== 1980s ===
The 1980s were a period of perseverance between the First Division and the Finnish Championship League. The era saw the introduction of a managing director role. The decade’s lessons were learned off the pitch, which came at a high cost in the following decade, as the club faced financial difficulties due to multiple factors. However, the youth program remained a source of pride, consistently keeping KPV’s teams at the forefront nationally.

=== 1990s ===
The club’s name officially incorporated the letter “j” due to a debt restructuring process in the 1990s. During this period, the group of junior coaches shouldered significant responsibility, and their work received a much-needed boost despite the challenges. The senior team competed in the First and Second Divisions.

=== 2000s ===
By the end of 2000, the club celebrated its 70th eventful year with renewed optimism for the future. In 2001, KPV launched its first website. In 2002, the Finnish Football Association granted KPV the status of a talent academy. In 2003, the club resumed activities in women’s football. That same year, the club’s B-juniors won bronze in the Finnish Championship. The senior team’s promotion to the First Division for the 2005 season was a testament to the club’s diligent work. Finishing fifth in their debut season under coach Antti Ylimäki was a commendable achievement. For the 2008 season, KPV’s women’s team was promoted to Ykkönen, the second-highest league tier. In 2009, KPV’s women’s team reached the Women’s League through a merger with Puistola and Kontula. They finished tenth, securing their place in the league for the 2010 season.

=== 2010s ===
Looking toward the new decade, the board prioritised strict financial discipline and aimed to increase membership to match the club’s activities. The senior team continued its strong performance, positioning KPV/KPV-juniors at the top of Ykkönen’s statistics. The women’s team relinquished its league spot in favour of the newly established Kokkola F10. On the junior side, KPV became the city’s largest club in terms of player numbers, though the focus of the 1970s-era coaching staff remained on prioritising quality over quantity. The decade culminated in a grand 80th-anniversary celebration, attended by approximately 200 guests and featuring a speech by Kimmo J. Lipponen, CEO of the Finnish Football Association. During the event, a record 37 individuals were honoured with the club’s golden merit badge, and the club’s history book, “Kalahallin hiekasta noussut?” (“Risen from the Sand of Kalahalli?”), was unveiled.

=== Domestic history ===
Season to season of KPV

Season	Level	Division	Section	Position	League Cup	Finnish Cup	Result
1939	Tier 2	Itä-Länsi-Sarja	West League Group 4	6th	–	–	–
1940	No Data Available						
1940-41	Tier 3	C-Sarja	Group 4	5th	–	–	–
1942	–	–	–	–	–	1st Round	–
1943	No Data Available						
1944	No Data Available						
1945	–	–	–	–	–	3rd Round	–
1945-46	Tier 3	SPL Maakuntasarja	North Group	3rd	–	–	–
1946-47	Tier 3	SPL Maakuntasarja	North Group	1st	–	–	Promoted to Suomensarja
1947-48	Tier 2	Suomensarja	North Group	4th	–	–	–
1948	Tier 2	Suomensarja	North Group	6th	–	–	–
1949	Tier 2	Suomensarja	West Group	3rd	–	–	–
1950	Tier 2	Suomensarja	West Group	4th	–	–	–
1951	Tier 2	Suomensarja	West Group	8th	–	–	–
1952	Tier 2	Suomensarja	West Group	9th	–	–	Relegated to Maakuntasarja
1953	Tier 3	Maakuntasarja	North Group A	1st	–	–	Promoted to Suomensarja
1954	Tier 2	Suomensarja	West Group	4th	–	–	–
1955	Tier 2	Suomensarja	West Group	6th	–	1st Round	–
1956	Tier 2	Suomensarja	West Group	8th	–	1st Round	–
1957	Tier 2	Suomensarja	West Group	9th	–	1st Round	Relegated to Maakuntasarja
1958	Tier 3	Maakuntasarja	Group 8	4th	–	3rd Qualifying Round	–
1959	Tier 3	Maakuntasarja	Group 8	1st	–	1st Round	Promoted to Suomensarja
1960	Tier 2	Suomensarja	North Group	8th	–	2nd Round	–
1961	Tier 2	Suomensarja	North Group	5th	–	2nd Round	–
1962	Tier 2	Suomensarja	North Group	3rd	–	2nd Round	–
1963	Tier 2	Suomensarja	North Group	7th	–	3rd Round	–
1964	Tier 2	Suomensarja	North Group	5th	–	1st Round	–
1965	Tier 2	Suomensarja	North Group	8th	–	–	–
1966	Tier 2	Suomensarja	North Group	1st	–	2nd Round	Promoted to Mestaruussarja
1967	Tier 1	Mestaruussarja	–	8th	–	1st Round	–
1968	Tier 1	Mestaruussarja	–	5th	–	Quarter-Finals	–
1969	Tier 1	Mestaruussarja	–	1st	–	2nd Round	Champions; Qualified to European Cup
1970	Tier 1	Mestaruussarja	–	6th	–	2nd Round	–
1971	Tier 1	Mestaruussarja	–	3rd	–	1st Round	–
1972	Tier 1	Mestaruussarja	–	5th	–	Semi-Finals	–
1973	Tier 1	Mestaruussarja	–	2nd	–	2nd Round	Qualified to UEFA Cup
1974	Tier 1	Mestaruussarja	–	9th	–	Semi-Finals	–
1975	Tier 1	Mestaruussarja	–	3rd	–	3rd Round	–
1976	Tier 1	Mestaruussarja	–	8th	–	1st Round	–
1977	Tier 1	Mestaruussarja	–	6th	–	3rd Round	–
1978	Tier 1	Mestaruussarja	–	8th	–	3rd Round	–
1979	Tier 1	Mestaruussarja	–	9th	–	Quarter-Finals	–
1980	Tier 1	Mestaruussarja	–	12th	–	1st Round	Promotion/Relegation League 6th - Relegated to Ykkönen
1981	Tier 2	Ykkönen	–	2nd	–	8th Round	Promotion/Relegation League 3rd - Promoted to Mestaruussarja
1982	Tier 1	Mestaruussarja	–	6th	–	Final	–
1983	Tier 1	Mestaruussarja	–	6th	–	1st Round	–
1984	Tier 1	Mestaruussarja	–	11th	–	4th Round	Relegation Playoff
1985	Tier 1	Mestaruussarja	–	12th	–	5th Round	Relegated to Ykkönen
1986	Tier 2	Ykkönen	–	5th	–	5th Round	–
1987	Tier 2	Ykkönen	–	5th	–	4th Round	–
1988	Tier 2	Ykkönen	–	5th	–	1st Round	–
1989	Tier 2	Ykkönen	–	1st	–	6th Round	Promoted to Veikkausliiga
1990	Tier 1	Veikkausliiga	–	11th	–	6th Round	Relegation Playoff - Relegated to Ykkönen
1991	Tier 2	Ykkönen	–	8th	–	5th Round	–
1992	Tier 2	Ykkönen	–	6th	–	4th Round	–
1993	Tier 2	Ykkönen	–	9th	–	5th Round	–
1994	Tier 2	Ykkönen	–	8th	–	7th Round	–
1995	Tier 2	Ykkönen	–	13th	–	7th Round	Relegated to Kakkonen
1996	Tier 3	Kakkonen	North Group	6th	–	5th Round	–
1997	Tier 3	Kakkonen	West Group	1st	–	5th Round	Promoted to Ykkönen
1998	Tier 2	Ykkönen	North Group	9th	–	5th Round	–
1999	Tier 2	Ykkönen	North Group	7th	–	4th Round	Relegated to Kakkonen
2000	Tier 3	Kakkonen	North Group	6th	–	6th Round	–
2001	Tier 3	Kakkonen	North Group	5th	–	5th Round	–
2002	Tier 3	Kakkonen	North Group	2nd	–	5th Round	–
2003	Tier 3	Kakkonen	North Group	4th	–	4th Round	–
2004	Tier 3	Kakkonen	Northern Group	1st	–	4th Round	Promotion Playoff - Promoted to Ykkönen
2005	Tier 2	Ykkönen	–	4th	–	5th Round	–
2006	Tier 2	Ykkönen	–	9th	–	Final	–
2007	Tier 2	Ykkönen	–	10th	–	6th Round	–
2008	Tier 2	Ykkönen	–	6th	–	6th Round	–
2009	Tier 2	Ykkönen	–	2nd	–	4th Round	Promotion Playoff
2010	Tier 2	Ykkönen	–	4th	–	6th Round	–
2011	Tier 2	Ykkönen	–	12th	–	4th Round	Relegated to Kakkonen
2012	Tier 3	Kakkonen	Northern Group	7th	–	5th Round	–
2013	Tier 3	Kakkonen	Northern Group	6th	–	3rd Round	–
2014	Tier 3	Kakkonen	Northern Group	6th	–	3rd Round	–
2015	Tier 3	Kakkonen	Northern Group	1st	–	6th Round	Promotion Playoff - Promoted to Ykkönen
2016	Tier 2	Ykkönen	–	5th	–	6th Round	–
2017	Tier 2	Ykkönen	–	3rd	–	Group Stage - 1st - Quarter-finals	–
2018	Tier 2	Ykkönen	–	2nd	–	Group Stage - 3rd - Round of 16	Promotion Playoff - Promoted to Veikkausliiga
2019	Tier 1	Veikkausliiga	–	11th	–	Group Stage - 3rd - Semi-finals	Relegation Playoff - Relegated to Ykkönen
2020	Tier 2	Ykkönen	–	8th	–	Group Stage - 2nd - Round of 16	–
2021	Tier 2	Ykkönen	–	7th	–	Group Stage - 4th	–
2022	Tier 2	Ykkönen	–	5th	–	4th Round	–
2023	Tier 2	Ykkönen	–	11th	–	Round of 16	Relegated to Ykkönen
2024	Tier 3	Ykkönen	–	2nd	–	Quarter-finals	Promotion Playoff
2025	Tier 3	Ykkönen	–	4th	–	Round of 16	–
2026	Tier 3	Ykkönen	–	11th	–	5th Round	Relegated to Kakkonen
2027	Tier 4	Kakkonen	–	–	–	–	–

Appearances:

- 20 seasons in Tier 1 Division (Mestaruussarja 1930–1989, Veikkausliiga 1990–onwards)
- 44 seasons in Tier 2 Division (Suomensarja 1936–1972, Ykkönen 1973–2023, Ykkösliiga 2024–onwards)
- 20 seasons in Tier 3 Division (Maakuntasarja 1936–1972, Kakkonen 1973–2023, Ykkönen 2024–onwards)
- 1 season in Tier 4 Division (Kolmonen 1973–2023, Kakkonen 2024–onwards)

=== European history ===
Winning the domestic league the previous season for the first time, KPV qualified for the European Cup and played in a European competition for the first time in the 1970-71 season. Celtic beat KPV in the first round with an aggregate of 0–14.

For the 1974–75 season, the team managed to qualify in the UEFA Cup, but 1. FC Köln beat KPV in the first round with an aggregate of 2–9.

Season	Competition	Round	Club	Home	Away	Aggregate
1970–71	European Cup	First Round	(Scotland) Celtic	0–9	0–5	0–14
1974–75	UEFA Cup	First Round	(Germany) 1. FC Köln	1–5	1–4	2–9

== Current squad ==
Updated 20 August 2026
Note: Flags indicate national team as defined under FIFA eligibility rules; some limited exceptions apply. Players may hold more than one non-FIFA nationality.

No.	Pos.	Nation	Player
1	GK	FIN	Petrus Kytölaakso
3	DF	FIN	Madut Deng
4	DF	FIN	Elias Vesala
6	DF	FIN	Matias Åberg
7	FW	FIN	Pietro Kytölaakso
8	MF	FIN	Ville Välipakka
9	FW	FIN	Wegye Wegye
10	MF	GHA	Justice Adarkwa
11	FW	FIN	Niilo Santalo
12	GK	FIN	Kaarle Suoraniemi
13	DF	FIN	Onni Moilanen
14	FW	FIN	Vertti Åkerblom
16	DF	FIN	Arne Vesa

No.	Pos.	Nation	Player
17	DF	FIN	Felix Friberg
19	FW	FIN	Juho Pirkkalainen
20	MF	FIN	Jani Mäenpää
21	DF	FIN	Waltteri Koivisto
22	DF	FIN	Onni Santalo
26	MF	FIN	Pyry Pensaari
29	DF	FIN	William Mikkola
44	FW	FIN	Johannes Moilanen
45	MF	FIN	Akonon Arope
77	MF	FIN	Jesse Hirvinen
87	MF	FIN	Onni Länsipää
99	GK	FIN	Filip Enqvist

=== Former players ===
For a complete list of former Kokkolan Palloveikot players with Wikipedia articles, see Category:Kokkolan Palloveikot players.

== Management ==
As of 11 March 2026

Name	Role
(Finland) Niko Kalliokoski	Head coach
(Finland) Aki Sipilä	Coach
(Finland) Pasi Torppa	Goalkeeper Coach
(Finland) Oskar Ylimäki	Fitness Coach

== Honours ==
League

- Finnish First Division (Mestaruussarja 1930–1989, Veikkausliiga 1990–onwards)
  - Champions (1): 1969
- Finnish Second Division (Suomensarja 1936–1972, Ykkönen 1973–2023, Ykkösliiga 2024–onwards)
  - Champions (2): 1966, 1989
- Finnish Third Division (Maakuntasarja 1936–1972, Kakkonen 1973–2023, Ykkönen 2024–onwards)
  - Champions (6): 1946-47, 1953, 1959, 1997, 2004, 2015

Cup

- Finnish Cup
  - Runners-up (2): 1982, 2006
