= 1969 Mestaruussarja =

Mestaruussarja
- Season: 1969
- Champions: KPV Kokkola
- Relegated: KTP Kotka, Ässät Pori

Statistics of Mestaruussarja in the 1969 season.

== Overview ==
It was contested by 12 teams, and KPV Kokkola won the championship.

== League standings ==
Pos	Team	Pld	W	D	L	GF	GA	GD	Pts
1	KPV Kokkola (C)	22	17	1	4	44	13	+31	35
2	KuPS Kuopio	22	13	6	3	47	24	+23	32
3	HJK Helsinki	22	11	5	6	50	32	+18	27
4	Reipas Lahti	22	10	6	6	40	24	+16	26
5	MP Mikkeli	22	10	6	6	43	33	+10	26
6	Ilves-Kissat Tampere	22	10	5	7	52	30	+22	25
7	Haka Valkeakoski	22	10	3	9	40	25	+15	23
8	TPS Turku	22	9	4	9	44	40	+4	22
9	Elo Kuopio	22	7	7	8	35	40	−5	21
10	Kuusysi Lahti	22	6	3	13	20	41	−21	15
11	KTP Kotka (R)	22	2	2	18	26	66	−40	6
12	Ässät Pori (R)	22	1	4	17	19	92	−73	6

Source: rsssf.com
(C) Champions; (R) Relegated

== Results ==
Home \ Away	ELO	HAK	HJK	ILV	KPV	KTP	KPS	L69	MP	REI	TPS	ÄSS
Elo		0–2	3–1	1–3	1–2	3–2	3–3	2–0	2–2	0–4	2–2	5–0
FC Haka	1–2		0–1	1–0	1–0	5–0	3–0	2–0	1–3	2–3	1–2	8–2
HJK Helsinki	6–4	1–1		1–1	3–2	5–1	2–2	3–0	4–0	2–0	4–2	10–1
I-Kissat	4–0	0–1	1–0		0–3	3–2	1–2	3–0	2–2	5–1	3–1	6–0
KPV	2–1	1–0	1–0	2–0		2–0	0–1	4–0	2–0	1–0	2–0	5–1
KTP	1–1	1–1	0–2	1–4	0–4		1–4	0–1	4–0	1–3	1–8	5–2
KuPS	1–1	0–0	4–1	2–1	1–0	2–0		3–0	5–0	0–1	4–1	5–1
Lahti-69	0–1	1–2	0–0	3–0	0–2	3–1	2–2		2–2	1–3	0–1	1–0
MP	2–0	1–0	5–0	3–3	0–1	4–2	2–0	3–2		2–1	3–0	1–1
Reipas	1–1	3–1	0–0	2–2	2–3	4–0	0–1	5–0	0–0		2–2	4–0
TPS	1–2	2–1	4–3	1–1	1–4	2–1	2–3	1–2	1–0	0–0		6–0
Ässät	0–0	2–6	0–1	1–9	1–1	3–2	2–2	1–2	0–8	0–1	1–4	

Legend: Blue = home team win; Yellow = draw; Red = away team win.
