= 1995 Finnish Cup =

1995 Suomen Cup
Tournament details
- Country: Finland

Final positions
- Champions: MyPa

The 1995 Finnish Cup (Finnish: Suomen Cup) was the 41st season of the main annual association football cup competition in Finland. It was organised as a single-elimination knock–out tournament and participation in the competition was voluntary. The final was held at the Olympic Stadium, Helsinki on 28 October 1995 with MyPa defeating FC Jazz by 1-0 before an attendance of 6,140 spectators.

== Early rounds ==
Not currently available.

== Round 9 ==
Tie no	Home team	Score	Away team	Information
1	KTP Kotka	0-4	Ilves Tampere	
2	ÅIFK Turku	0-9	Jaro Pietarsaari	
3	HJK Helsinki	2-1	RoPS Rovaniemi	
4	KajHa Kajaani	0-3	Haka Valkeakoski	

Tie no	Home team	Score	Away team	Information
5	Inter Turku	1-1 (aet); 4-2 (p.)	TPV Tampere	
6	MyPa Anjalankoski	2-0	Kuusysi Lahti	
7	Jazz Pori	2-0	MP Mikkeli	
8	TP-Seinäjoki	2-0	Reipas Lahti	

== Quarter-finals ==
Tie no	Home team	Score	Away team	Information
1	HJK Helsinki	4-2	Ilves Tampere	
2	MyPa Anjalankoski	2-1	Jaro Pietarsaari	

Tie no	Home team	Score	Away team	Information
3	Jazz Pori	2-1	Haka Valkeakoski	
4	TP-Seinäjoki	0-6	Inter Turku	

== Semi-finals ==
Tie no	Home team	Score	Away team	Information
1	Jazz Pori	2-0	HJK Helsinki	
2	MyPa Anjalankoski	4-0	Inter Turku	

Tie no	Home team	Score	Away team	Information
3	HJK Helsinki	0-0	Jazz Pori	
4	Inter Turku	2-1	MyPa Anjalankoski	

== Final ==
Tie no	Team 1	Score	Team 2	Information
1	MyPa Anjalankoski	1-0	Jazz Pori	Att. 6,140
