= 2004 Kakkonen – Finnish League Division 2 =

Finnish League Division 2
- Season: 2004
- Champions: Atlantis FC; JJK Jyväskylä; FJK; KPV
- Promoted: Atlantis FC; PK-35; KPV
- Relegated: 8 teams

League tables for teams participating in Kakkonen, the third tier of the Finnish Soccer League system, in 2004. Kakkonen was reduced to 3 groups of 14 teams for season 2006.

== League tables 2004 ==
=== Southern Group, Etelälohko ===
Pos	Team	Pld	W	D	L	GF	GA	GD	Pts	Qualification or relegation
1	Atlantis FC, Helsinki	24	18	4	2	55	19	+36	58	Promotion Playoff
2	PK-35, Helsinki	24	16	4	4	60	25	+35	52	Promotion Playoff
3	Klubi-04, Helsinki	24	13	5	6	61	31	+30	44	
4	FC Espoo	24	14	1	9	46	29	+17	43	
5	IF Gnistan, Helsinki	24	9	7	8	37	33	+4	34	
6	HyPS, Hyvinkää	24	9	5	10	36	41	−5	32	
7	LPS, Helsinki	23	9	4	10	38	53	−15	31	
8	FC Kontu, Helsinki	24	7	8	9	37	47	−10	29	
9	FCK Salamat, Kirkkonummi	24	8	3	13	39	40	−1	27	
10	FC Pantterit, Joutseno	24	8	2	14	37	58	−21	26	Relegation Playoff
11	KäPa, Helsinki	24	6	7	11	28	44	−16	25	Relegation Playoff
12	Kiffen, Helsinki	24	5	6	13	27	42	−15	21	Relegated
13	TiPS, Vantaa	24	5	3	16	33	72	−39	18	Relegated

NB: Jokerit withdrew from Premier Division and were bought by HJK. The revamped club was named Klubi-04 and became HJK's "reserve" team. They obtained a place in Division Two South.

=== Eastern Group, Itälohko ===
Pos	Team	Pld	W	D	L	GF	GA	GD	Pts	Qualification or relegation
1	JJK Jyväskylä	22	15	5	2	54	18	+36	50	Promotion Playoff
2	JIPPO, Joensuu	22	15	4	3	55	21	+34	49	Promotion Playoff
3	Kings, Kuopio	22	13	5	4	42	14	+28	44	
4	Huima, Äänekoski	22	9	10	3	37	23	+14	37	
5	Warkaus JK	22	11	3	8	46	33	+13	36	
6	Jyväskylä United	22	10	5	7	50	23	+27	35	
7	TP-Seinäjoki	22	8	4	10	38	42	−4	28	
8	Virkiä, Lapua	22	7	6	9	28	31	−3	27	
9	MiKi, Mikkeli	22	6	3	13	24	67	−43	21	
10	KajHa, Kajaani	22	5	3	14	28	43	−15	18	Relegation Playoff
11	PK-37, Iisalmi	22	5	3	14	21	50	−29	18	Relegated
12	LehPa, Kontiolahti	21	2	1	18	21	79	−58	7	Relegated

NB: SäyRi's place in Division Two was taken by Jyväskylä United.

=== Western Group, Länsilohko ===
Pos	Team	Pld	W	D	L	GF	GA	GD	Pts	Qualification or relegation
1	FJK, Forssa	22	16	4	2	46	8	+38	52	Promotion Playoff
2	TPV, Tampere	22	12	7	3	39	18	+21	43	Promotion Playoff
3	PIF, Parainen	22	11	6	5	39	17	+22	39	
4	Masku	22	10	4	8	24	21	+3	34	
5	EIF, Tammisaari	22	9	6	7	47	29	+18	33	
6	SalPa, Salo	22	9	5	8	36	30	+6	32	
7	MuSa, Pori	22	6	7	9	34	41	−7	25	
8	Kaskö IK, Kaskinen	22	6	7	9	27	37	−10	25	
9	KaaPo, Kaarina	22	6	6	10	21	31	−10	24	
10	TKT, Tampere	22	6	5	11	26	36	−10	23	Relegation Playoff
11	EuPa, Eura	22	5	7	10	24	42	−18	22	Relegated
12	FC Rauma	22	3	2	17	16	69	−53	11	Relegated

=== Northern Group, Pohjoislohko ===
Pos	Team	Pld	W	D	L	GF	GA	GD	Pts	Qualification or relegation
1	KPV, Kokkola	20	15	1	4	48	13	+35	46	Promotion Playoff
2	OLS, Oulu	20	14	4	2	42	11	+31	46	Promotion Playoff
3	JBK, Pietarsaari	20	11	2	7	44	30	+14	35	
4	PS Kemi	20	9	8	3	37	26	+11	35	
5	FC Kiisto, Vaasa	20	9	4	7	47	34	+13	31	
6	VIFK, Vaasa	20	9	4	7	39	32	+7	31	
7	FC Korsholm, Mustasaari	20	6	4	10	22	34	−12	22	
8	TUS, Teerijärvi	20	6	3	11	28	34	−6	21	
9	FC YPA, Ylivieska	20	6	0	14	36	74	−38	18	
10	Tervarit, Oulu	20	4	2	14	23	35	−12	14	Relegation Playoff
11	FC Rio Grande, Rovaniemi	20	4	2	14	14	57	−43	14	Relegated

NB: Because GBK were promoted to Division One, Division Two North was played with 11 teams.

=== Promotion Playoff ===
Round 1

First Leg

JIPPO 2-1 Atlantis
PK-35 1-0 JJK
OLS 0-0 FJK
TPV 1-2 KPV

Second Leg

Atlantis 2-1 JIPPO [aet, 4-3 pen]
JJK 0-1 PK-35
FJK 2-2 OLS
KPV 1-0 TPV

Round 2

First Leg

OLS 2-1 Atlantis
PK-35 6-0 KPV

Second Leg

Atlantis 3-1 OLS [aet]
KPV 1-2 PK-35

Atlantis and PK-35 promoted, KPV and OLS to division one/division two playoff.

=== Division One/Division Two Playoff ===
First Leg

KPV 1-1 Närpes Kraft
OLS 0-1 VG-62

Second Leg

VG-62 3-1 OLS
Närpes Kraft 1-1 KPV [aet, 1-4 pen]

KPV promoted, Närpes Kraft relegated. VG-62 remain at second level.

=== Relegation playoff ===
First Leg

PS-44 3-2 TKT
Jaro II 2-2 Tervarit
Futura 1-5 KäPa
Ponnistus 2-0 Pantterit
FCV 1-3 KajHa

Second Leg

TKT 4-1 PS-44
Pantterit 3-1 Ponnistus
Tervarit 5-2 Jaro II
KäPa 3-1 Futura
KajHa 6-1 FCV

Ponnistus promoted, Pantterit relegated. TKT, Tervarit, KäPa and KajHa remain at third level.

== References and sources ==
- Finnish FA, Suomen Palloliitto
