= GBK Kokkola =

Finnish football club

Gamlakarleby Bollklubb (GBK)
- Full name: Gamlakarleby Bollklubb (Kokkola Ball Club)
- Nickname: GBK
- Founded: 1924; 102 years ago
- Ground: Kokkola Areena
- Capacity: 3,000
- Chairman: Åström Robert
- Manager: Hohenthal Miika
- League: Ykkönen
- 2026: Kakkonen Group C, 2nd of 10 (promoted via play-offs)
- Website: https://www.gbk.fi/
Home colours	Away colours

Gamlakarleby Bollklubb is a Finnish football club from Kokkola (Gamlakarleby in Swedish). It currently plays in Kakkonen, which is the fourth-highest level in Finnish football. GBK play their home games at the arena in Kokkola, which has the capacity to accommodate around 3,000 people.

GBK is a bilingual club that organises its activities in both Finnish and Swedish.

== History ==
Year 1920 IV (Idrottens vänner) and GUIK (Gamlakarleby Ungdomsförenings Idrottsklubb) joined their teams, and the new club Gamlakarleby Idrottsförenig (GIF) was founded.

In the year 1921, the sponsor of GIF, August Kyntzell, had visited England and seen Stoke City playing in their red and white striped dress. Kyntzell became fond of the costumes and decided that his team (GIF and later GBK) would play in the same colours. In the summer of 1921, GIF appeared in red and white striped costumes.

On 19 February 1924, GIF changed its name to GBK, and it is therefore one of Finland's oldest football clubs. GBK's activity is currently focused on football, but the club has also played ice hockey and bandy until the 1950s. The ice hockey club Kokkolan Hermes (now Hermes HT) was formed in 1953, when GBK and KPV ice hockey sections amalgamated.

The club has a long tradition and has played 5 seasons (1959, 1964, 1965, 1966 and 1976) in the top division of the Finnish Championship (Veikkausliiga). They have also played 39 seasons at the second tier and 34 seasons in the third tier. The club secured promotion to the Ykkönen in September 2006, but their return to the second tier was short-lived as they were relegated at the end of the 2007 season. From 2008 to 2023, they have been playing in the third tier of the championship pyramid, until the championship tier reformation, which resulted in them ending up in the fourth tier of the pyramid in 2024.

In 2000, GBK became the first women's beach soccer champion in Finland, and the following year became a new championship team.

In 2026, GBK men and women moved their home turf to the Kokkola arena.

=== Kokkola Cup ===
The football tournament known as the Kokkola Cup is organised by GBK and is held in mid-July each year. This four-day tournament attracts about 300 teams to Kokkola and is recognised as Finland's second biggest football tournament after the Helsinki Cup.

The Kokkola Cup was initiated in 1981 by Lars-Erik Stenfors and the tournament has grown from 50 teams to 330 teams at its peak. Current professional players who have participated in the Kokkola Cup include Andy Marshall, Jimmy Nielsen, Craig Bellamy, Adam Drury, Danny Mills, Simon Davies and Matthew Etherington.

=== Domestic History ===
Season to season of GBK

Season	Level	Division	Section	Position	League Cup	Finnish Cup	Result
1936	Tier 3	Maakuntasarja	West	–	–	–	–
1937	Tier 3	Maakuntasarja	West	–	–	–	Promoted to Itä-Länsi-sarja
1938	Tier 2	Itä-Länsi-sarja	West League, Northern Group	3rd	–	–	–
1939	Tier 2	Itä-Länsi-sarja	West League, Group 4	3rd	–	–	–
1940	No Data Available						
1940-41	Tier 3	C-Sarja	Group 4	2nd	–	–	–
1942	No Data Available						
1943	No Data Available						
1944	No Data Available						
1945	Tier 2	Suomensarja	Group A	1st	–	–	–
1945-46	Tier 2	Suomensarja	–	6th	–	–	–
1946-47	Tier 2	Suomensarja	North Group	7th	–	–	Relegated to Maakuntasarja
1947-48	Tier 3	Maakuntasarja	Central Ostrobothnia Group	1st	–	–	Promoted to Suomensarja
1948	Tier 2	Suomensarja	North Group	4th	–	–	–
1949	Tier 2	Suomensarja	West Group	8th	–	–	Relegated to Maakuntasarja
1950	Tier 3	Maakuntasarja	North Group A	1st	–	–	Promoted to Suomensarja
1951	Tier 2	Suomensarja	West Group	5th	–	–	–
1952	Tier 2	Suomensarja	West Group	5th	–	–	–
1953	Tier 2	Suomensarja	West Group	6th	–	–	–
1954	Tier 2	Suomensarja	West Group	7th	–	–	–
1955	Tier 2	Suomensarja	West Group	2nd	–	Quarter-Finals	–
1956	Tier 2	Suomensarja	West Group	2nd	–	3rd Round	–
1957	Tier 2	Suomensarja	West Group	5th	–	1st Round	–
1958	Tier 2	Suomensarja	North Group	1st	–	1st Round	Promoted to Mestaruussarja
1959	Tier 1	Mestaruussarja	–	10th	–	2nd Round	Relegated to Suomensarja
1960	Tier 2	Suomensarja	North Group	2nd	–	3rd Round	–
1961	Tier 2	Suomensarja	North Group	3rd	–	3rd Round	–
1962	Tier 2	Suomensarja	North Group	6th	–	1st Round	–
1963	Tier 2	Suomensarja	North Group	1st	–	–	Promoted to Mestaruussarja
1964	Tier 1	Mestaruussarja	–	9th	–	3rd Round	–
1965	Tier 1	Mestaruussarja	–	4th	–	Quarter-Finals	–
1976	Tier 1	Mestaruussarja	–	11th	–	Quarter-Finals	Relegated to Suomensarja
1967	Tier 2	Suomensarja	North Group	8th	–	3rd Round	–
1968	Tier 2	Suomensarja	North Group	4th	–	1st Round	–
1969	Tier 2	Suomensarja	North Group	5th	–	2nd Round	–
1970	Tier 2	Kakkonen	North Group	6th	–	3rd Round	–
1971	Tier 2	Kakkonen	North Group	2nd	–	1st Round	–
1972	Tier 2	Kakkonen	North Group	3rd	–	1st Round	–
1973	Tier 2	Ykkönen	–	5th	–	1st Round	–
1974	Tier 2	Ykkönen	–	4th	–	2nd Round	–
1975	Tier 2	Ykkönen	–	1st	–	3rd Round	Promoted to Mestaruussarja
1976	Tier 1	Mestaruussarja	–	11th	–	1st Round	Relegated to Ykkönen
1977	Tier 2	Ykkönen	–	4th	–	Quarter-Finals	–
1978	Tier 2	Ykkönen	–	5th	–	1st Round	–
1979	Tier 2	Ykkönen	–	5th	–	1st Round	–
1980	Tier 2	Ykkönen	–	11th	–	1st Round	Relegated to Kakkonen
1981	Tier 3	Kakkonen	North Group	12th	–	2nd Round	Relegated to Kolmonen
1982	Tier 4	Kolmonen	Group 8	3rd	–	5th Round	Promotion Playoff
1983	Tier 4	Kolmonen	Group 8	1st	–	2nd Round	Promoted to Kakkonen
1984	Tier 3	Kakkonen	North Group	7th	–	1st Round	–
1985	Tier 3	Kakkonen	North Group	10th	–	4th Round	Relegated to Kolmonen
1986	Tier 4	Kolmonen	Group 8	5th	–	3rd Round	–
1987	Tier 4	Kolmonen	Group 8	3rd	–	1st Round	–
1988	Tier 4	Kolmonen	Group 8	2nd	–	5th Round	–
1989	Tier 4	Kolmonen	Group 8	1st	–	4th Round	Promoted to Kakkonen
1990	Tier 3	Kakkonen	North Group	7th	–	2nd Round	–
1991	Tier 3	Kakkonen	North Group	11th	–	5th Round	Relegated to Kolmonen
1992	Tier 4	Kolmonen	Group 8	1st	–	3rd Round	Promoted to Kakkonen
1993	Tier 3	Kakkonen	North Group	5th	–	5th Round	–
1994	Tier 3	Kakkonen	North Group	1st	–	4th Round	Promoted to Ykkönen
1995	Tier 2	Ykkönen	–	10th	–	6th Round	–
1996	Tier 2	Ykkönen	North Group	5th	–	6th Round	–
1997	Tier 2	Ykkönen	North Group	9th	–	8th Round	Relegated to Kakkonen
1998	Tier 3	Kakkonen	West Group	3rd	–	–	–
1999	Tier 3	Kakkonen	North Group	3rd	–	5th Round	–
2000	Tier 3	Kakkonen	North Group	4th	–	6th Round	–
2001	Tier 3	Kakkonen	North Group	2nd	–	2nd Round	Promoted to Ykkönen
2002	Tier 2	Ykkönen	North Group	3rd	–	–	–
2003	Tier 2	Ykkönen	–	11th	–	–	–
2004	Tier 2	Ykkönen	–	14th	–	4th Round	Relegated to Kakkonen
2005	Tier 3	Kakkonen	North Group	5th	–	4th Round	–
2006	Tier 3	Kakkonen	Group C	1st	–	6th Round	Promoted to Ykkönen
2007	Tier 2	Ykkönen	–	13th	–	Semi-Finals	Relegated to Kakkonen
2008	Tier 3	Kakkonen	Group C	2nd	–	5th Round	–
2009	Tier 3	Kakkonen	Group C	8th	–	6th Round	–
2010	Tier 3	Kakkonen	Group C	7th	–	5th Round	–
2011	Tier 3	Kakkonen	Group C	2nd	–	7th Round	–
2012	Tier 3	Kakkonen	North Group	2nd	–	5th Round	–
2013	Tier 3	Kakkonen	North Group	5th	–	5th Round	–
2014	Tier 3	Kakkonen	North Group	4th	–	3rd Round	–
2015	Tier 3	Kakkonen	North Group	5th	–	4th Round	–
2016	Tier 3	Kakkonen	North Group	4th	–	4th Round	–
2017	Tier 3	Kakkonen	Group C	2nd	–	1st Round	–
2018	Tier 3	Kakkonen	Group C	2nd	–	–	Promotion Playoff
2019	Tier 3	Kakkonen	Group C	6th	–	–	–
2020	Tier 3	Kakkonen	Group C	9th	–	–	–
2021	Tier 3	Kakkonen	Group C	11th	–	–	–
2022	Tier 3	Kakkonen	Group C	9th	–	3rd Round	–
2023	Tier 3	Kakkonen	Group C	7th	–	3rd Round	–
2024	Tier 4	Kakkonen	Group C	1st	–	4th Round	Promotion Playoff
2025	Tier 4	Kakkonen	Group C	2nd	–	5th Round	Promotion Playoff
2026	Tier 4	Kakkonen	Group C	2nd	–	4th Round	Promoted to Ykkönen
2027	Tier 3	Ykkönen	–	–	–	–	–

Appearances:

- 5 seasons in Tier 1 Division (Veikkausliiga)
- 39 seasons in Tier 2 Division (Ykkösliiga)
- 35 seasons in Tier 3 Division (Ykkönen)
- 10 seasons in Tier 4 Division (Kakkonen)

== Current squad ==
Note: Flags indicate national team as defined under FIFA eligibility rules; some limited exceptions apply. Players may hold more than one non-FIFA nationality.

No.	Pos.	Nation	Player
1	GK	FIN	Olli Nylund
2	MF	FIN	Jussi Roiko
3	MF	USA	Lawrence Smith
4	MF	FIN	Petteri Jokihaara
5	DF	POL	Brela Mateusz
6	MF	RUS	Shelenskiy Nikol
7	FW	POL	Kochanowski Jakub
8	DF	USA	Chris Corcoran
9	FW	FIN	Benjamin Storbacka
10	MF	FIN	Niko Tukeva
11	FW	SWE	David Carlsson
12	MF	FIN	Miika Hohenthal
13	GK	FIN	Jonas Holm
14	FW	FIN	Deng Malwal
15	MF	FIN	Tom Åstrand

No.	Pos.	Nation	Player
16	MF	FIN	Paul Adour
17	MF	FIN	Juho Alasuutari
18	DF	FIN	Tatu Mäki
19	FW	FIN	Tobias Wentin
20	MF	FIN	Kim Ågren
21	MF	FIN	Alfred Söderman
22	MF	FIN	Aaro Hedman
23	FW	FIN	Atte Henttu
24	FW	FIN	Linus Sandell
25	DF	FIN	Ville Jylhä
26	DF	FIN	Tomi Björklund
27	MF	FIN	Angilo Lado
28	GK	FIN	Oskari Wikström
29	GK	RUS	Byeskiy Vityuslav
30	MF	BRA	Toró

== Honours ==
League

- Finnish Second Division (Suomensarja 1936–1972, Ykkönen 1973–2023, Ykkösliiga 2024–onwards)
  - Champions (4): 1945, 1958, 1963, 1975
- Finnish Third Division (Maakuntasarja 1936–1972, Kakkonen 1973–2023, Ykkönen 2024–onwards)
  - Champions (4): 1947-48, 1950, 1994, 2006
- Finnish Fourth Division (Kolmonen 1973–2023, Kakkonen 2024–onwards)
  - Champions (4): 1983, 1989, 1992, 2024

== References and sources ==
- Official website
- Finnish Wikipedia
- Suomen Cup (archived)
- GBK (Gamlakarleby Bollklubb) on Facebook
