= Grankulla IFK =

Finnish sports club

- Full name: Idrottsföreningen Kamraterna, Grankulla
- Nicknames: GrIFK, Grani
- Founded: 1925
- Ground: Kauniaisten Keskuskenttä, Kauniainen; Finland
- Capacity: 3500
- Chairman: Matti Hannuksela
- Manager: Ilir Zeneli
- League: Kakkonen
- 2026: Kakkonen Group B, 7th of 10
Home colours	Away colours

Grankulla IFK, or GrIFK as the name is commonly abbreviated, is a Finnish sports club from the city of Kauniainen. The club was formed in 1925 and the main activities covered are football, ice-hockey, handball, floorball and alpine. Each sport is organized in separated daughter clubs since 1997. These are GrIFK-Fotboll, GrIFK-Handboll, GrIFK-Salibandy, GrIFK-Icehockey and GrIFK Alpine.

Football

The club's main football team is currently playing in the Kakkonen, the third tier of the Finnish football league system. GrIFK play their home matches at Kauniaisten Keskuskenttä. The chairman of the football club is Matti Hannuksela. The club has more than 750 registered players.

Futsal

The club has also become a club with many futsal teams. Many of the teams with younger players play futsal during the winter season. In 2022, the club had close to 20 different teams and the B-junior team ended 2nd on the national level.

== History ==
GrIFK Football has played 13 seasons in the Ykkönen (First Division), the second tier of Finnish football in 1978–80, 1982–85, 1987–88, 1990, 2008 and 2016–2017. They also have had ten spells (covering 21 seasons) in the third tier, the Kakkonen (the Second Division), in 1973–75, 1977, 1981, 1986, 1989, 1991–92, 1996, 2005–07, 2009-2015 and 2018 to the present day.

== Season to season ==
Season to season of GrIFK

Season	Level	Division	Section	Administration	Position	
1971	Tier 4	4. divisioona (Fourth Division)	Group 2	Finnish FA (Suomen Pallolitto)	1st	Promoted
1972	Tier 3	3. divisioona (Third Division)	Group 1	Finnish FA (Suomen Pallolitto)	2nd	Promoted
1973	Tier 3	2. divisioona (Second Division)	East Group	Finnish FA (Suomen Pallolitto)	6th	
1974	Tier 3	2. divisioona (Second Division)	East Group	Finnish FA (Suomen Pallolitto)	4th	
1975	Tier 3	2. divisioona (Second Division)	East Group	Finnish FA (Suomen Pallolitto)	11th	Relegated
1976	Tier 4	3. divisioona (Third Division)	Group 2	Finnish FA (Suomen Pallolitto)	1st	Promoted
1977	Tier 3	2. divisioona (Second Division)	West Group	Finnish FA (Suomen Pallolitto)	1st	Promoted
1978	Tier 2	1. divisioona (First Division)		Finnish FA (Suomen Pallolitto)	8th	
1979	Tier 2	1. divisioona (First Division)		Finnish FA (Suomen Pallolitto)	4th	Mestaruussarja Promotion/Relegation Group 8th
1980	Tier 2	1. divisioona (First Division)		Finnish FA (Suomen Pallolitto)	10th	Relegation Group 6th - Relegated
1981	Tier 3	2. divisioona (Second Division)	West Group	Finnish FA (Suomen Pallolitto)	1st	Promotion Playoff - Promoted
1982	Tier 2	1. divisioona (First Division)		Finnish FA (Suomen Pallolitto)	11th	Relegation Group 5th
1983	Tier 2	1. divisioona (First Division)		Finnish FA (Suomen Pallolitto)	6th	Relegation Group 2nd
1984	Tier 2	1. divisioona (First Division)		Finnish FA (Suomen Pallolitto)	7th	
1985	Tier 2	1. divisioona (First Division)		Finnish FA (Suomen Pallolitto)	12th	Relegated
1986	Tier 3	2. divisioona (Second Division)	East Group	Finnish FA (Suomen Pallolitto)	1st	Promoted
1987	Tier 2	1. divisioona (First Division)		Finnish FA (Suomen Pallolitto)	2nd	Promotion Playoff
1988	Tier 2	1. divisioona (First Division)		Finnish FA (Suomen Pallolitto)	10th	Relegation Playoff - Relegated
1989	Tier 3	2. divisioona (Second Division)	West Group	Finnish FA (Suomen Pallolitto)	1st	Promoted
1990	Tier 2	1. divisioona (First Division)		Finnish FA (Suomen Pallolitto)	12th	Relegated
1991	Tier 3	2. divisioona (Second Division)	East Group	Finnish FA (Suomen Pallolitto)	9th	
1992	Tier 3	2. divisioona (Second Division)	East Group	Finnish FA (Suomen Pallolitto)	11th	Relegated
1993	Tier 4	Kolmonen (Third Division)	Group 2	Finnish FA (Suomen Pallolitto)	8th	
1994	Tier 4	Kolmonen (Third Division)	Group 1	Finnish FA (Suomen Pallolitto)	5th	
1995	Tier 4	Kolmonen (Third Division)	Group 1	Finnish FA (Suomen Pallolitto)	1st	Promoted
1996	Tier 3	Kakkonen (Second Division)	West Group	Finnish FA (Suomen Pallolitto)	12th	Relegated - Ceased men´s team operations due to financial difficulties
1997-1999	Tier 4	Kolmonen (Third Division)	Section 1			No first team
2000	Tier 4	Kolmonen (Third Division)	Section 1	Helsinki & Uusimaa (SPL Helsinki)	3rd	Took Team Grani´s place in Kolmonen
2001	Tier 4	Kolmonen (Third Division)	Section 3	Helsinki & Uusimaa (SPL Helsinki)		
2002	Tier 4	Kolmonen (Third Division)	Section 1	Helsinki & Uusimaa (SPL Uusimaa)	3rd	
2003	Tier 4	Kolmonen (Third Division)	Section 1	Helsinki & Uusimaa (SPL Uusimaa)	3rd	
2004	Tier 4	Kolmonen (Third Division)	Section 1	Helsinki & Uusimaa (SPL Uusimaa)	1st	Play-offs – Promoted
2005	Tier 3	Kakkonen (Second Division)	South Group	Finnish FA (Suomen Pallolitto)	8th	
2006	Tier 3	Kakkonen (Second Division)	Group B	Finnish FA (Suomen Pallolitto)	9th	
2007	Tier 3	Kakkonen (Second Division)	Group B	Finnish FA (Suomen Pallolitto)	1st	Promoted
2008	Tier 2	Ykkönen (First Division)	South Group	Finnish FA (Suomen Pallolitto)	13th	Relegated
2009	Tier 3	Kakkonen (Second Division)	Group A	Finnish FA (Suomen Pallolitto)	9th	
2010	Tier 3	Kakkonen (Second Division)	Group B	Finnish FA (Suomen Pallolitto)	3rd	
2011	Tier 3	Kakkonen (Second Division)	Group A	Finnish FA (Suomen Pallolitto)	4th	
2012	Tier 3	Kakkonen (Second Division)	Group South	Finnish FA (Suomen Pallolitto)	7th	
2013	Tier 3	Kakkonen (Second Division)	Group South	Finnish FA (Suomen Pallolitto)	3rd	
2014	Tier 3	Kakkonen (Second Division)	Group South	Finnish FA (Suomen Pallolitto)	2nd	
2015	Tier 3	Kakkonen (Second Division)	Group West	Finnish FA (Suomen Pallolitto)	1st	Promoted
2016	Tier 2	Ykkönen (First Division)		Finnish FA (Suomen Pallolitto)	6th	
2017	Tier 2	Ykkönen (First Division)		Finnish FA (Suomen Pallolitto)	9th	Relegated
2018	Tier 3	Kakkonen (Second Division)	Group B	Finnish FA (Suomen Pallolitto)	3rd	
2019	Tier 3	Kakkonen (Second Division)	Group B	Finnish FA (Suomen Pallolitto)	9th	
2020	Tier 3	Kakkonen (Second Division)	Group B	Finnish FA (Suomen Pallolitto)	8th	
2021	Tier 3	Kakkonen (Second Division)	Group B	Finnish FA (Suomen Pallolitto)	7th	
2022	Tier 3	Kakkonen (Second Division)	Group B	Finnish FA (Suomen Pallolitto)	6th	
2023	Tier 3	Kakkonen (Second Division)	Group B	Finnish FA (Suomen Pallolitto)	6th	
2024	Tier 4	Kakkonen (Second Division)	Group A	Finnish FA (Suomen Pallolitto)	5th	
2025	Tier 4	Kakkonen (Second Division)	Group A	Finnish FA (Suomen Pallolitto)	6th	

- 13 season in Second tier
- 27 seasons in Third tier
- 12 seasons in Fourth tier

== Club structure ==
GrIFK is in reality two different clubs. The men's team is separated from all the other teams mainly for financial reasons. All other teams are in the main part of GrIFK Football. This part consists of 3 men's teams, 1 veteran's team, and close to 20 boys teams. The number of girl teams is also gradually increasing due to a collaboration with the football club HooGee.

2020 season

GrIFK are competing in Group B (Lohko B) of the Kakkonen administered by the Football Association of Finland (Suomen Palloliitto) . This is the third highest tier in the Finnish football system. In 2019 GrIFK finished in ninth position in their Kakkonen section.

== Current squad (2026) ==
Note: Flags indicate national team as defined under FIFA eligibility rules; some limited exceptions apply. Players may hold more than one non-FIFA nationality.

No.	Pos.	Nation	Player
2	DF	FIN	Edi Tashevci
3	DF	FIN	Jonathan Ndongala
4	DF	FIN	Bangaly Theodor Kouyate
6	DF	SWE	August Andersson
7	FW	SLE	Tejan Deen
8	MF	FIN	Vide Rubensson Wallin
9	MF	FIN	Janne Leivo
12	GK	FIN	Aleksanteri Patronen
13	DF	FIN	Henrik Hellstén
15	FW	FIN	Ahmed Aehte
16	DF	FIN	Alexander Beijar
23	MF	FIN	Aleksi Kallio
24	FW	FIN	Ted Rosenström
25	DF	FIN	Lassi Sormunen
26	MF	FIN	Jami Bergman
87	FW	FIN	Nuutti Norhomaa

No.	Pos.	Nation	Player
30	FW	FIN	Joona Nikulainen
31	FW	FIN	Joni Mustalampi
29	MF	FIN	Muslim Markhiyev
32	MF	FIN	Sisu Saarinen
33	MF	FIN	Milot Peci
19	DF	FIN	Ville Mäkelä
18	MF	FIN	Kosti Laaksonen
34	GK	FIN	Chris Prevedouros
35	FW	FIN	Samuel Tuuva
24	DF	KOS	Kreshnik Tahiri
36	FW	FIN	Emil Frondelius
37	MF	FIN	Saku Salonen
38	DF	FIN	Benjamin Perander
39	FW	FIN	Rasmus Mäki
40	DF	FIN	Adam Alomari

== Sources ==
- Suomen Cup
