= Kakkonen =

Fourth level of the Finnish association football league system

Kakkonen (in Finnish) Tvåan (in Swedish)
- Founded: 1973
- Country: Finland
- Divisions: 3
- Number of clubs: 30
- Level on pyramid: 3 (1973–2023); 4 (2024–)
- Promotion to: Ykkönen
- Relegation to: Kolmonen
- Domestic cup: Finnish Cup
- Current champions: VJS, TPV (2025)
- Website: palloliitto.fi/kakkonen
- Current: 2026 Kakkonen

Kakkonen or II divisioona is the fourth level in the league system of Finnish football and comprises 30 Finnish football teams. Until the end of 2023, Kakkonen was the third-highest level in Finland, but after the creation of new second-tier Ykkösliiga, Kakkonen dropped down one level in the league pyramid. The new fourth-tier Kakkonen is divided to three groups, each consisting of 10 teams.

The II divisioona was introduced in 1973 and in the mid-1990s became known as the Kakkonen (Finnish for 'Number Two'; Swedish: Tvåan). Sakari Tukiainen finished the season 2014 as the top goal scorer and setting a new league record with 40 goals for the Kakkonen.

== League structure ==
Since 2024 season the format of the Kakkonen has the league divided in 3 groups of 10 teams, each representing a geographical area. Every club plays each other in the same group two times, after which the groups split into a championship group and relegation group, where the clubs play against each other once. Clubs gain three points for a win, one for a draw, and none for a loss. The group winners may win promotion to Ykkönen while two bottom clubs of each relegation group will be relegated to Kolmonen.

== Administration ==
The Football Association of Finland (Finnish: Suomen Palloliitto, SPL; Swedish: Finlands Bollförbund, FBF) administers the Kakkonen.

== Sections and teams 2026 ==
=== Kakkonen Group A ===
| No. | Abbreviated Name | Town or Settlement | Official Club and Team Name | Movements from 2025 |
|---|---|---|---|---|
| 1. | Atlantis | Helsinki | Atlantis FC | Relegated from Ykkönen |
| 2. | HIFK | Helsinki | HIFK Soccer | Promoted from Kolmonen |
| 3. | HPS | Helsinki | Helsingin Palloseura | |
| 4. | Kiffen | Helsinki | Kronohagens Idrottsförening | |
| 5. | MyPa | Kouvola | Myllykosken Pallo | |
| 6. | PEPO | Lappeenranta | PEPO Lappeenranta | |
| 7. | PuiU | Puistola, Helsinki | Puistolan Urheilijat | |
| 8. | PPJ | Helsinki | Pallo-Pojat Juniorit | |
| 9. | Reipas | Lahti | Lahden Reipas | |
| 10. | Union Plaani | Heinola | Union Plaani | Promoted from Kolmonen |

=== Kakkonen Group B ===
| No. | Abbreviated Name | Town or Settlement | Official Club and Team Name | Movements from 2025 |
|---|---|---|---|---|
| 1. | EBK | Espoo | Esbo Bollklubb | Promoted from Kolmonen |
| 2. | EPS | Espoonlahti, Espoo | Espoon Palloseura | Relegated from Ykkönen |
| 3. | GrIFK | Kauniainen | Grankulla Idrottsföreningen Kamraterna | |
| 4. | HJS | Hämeenlinna | Hämeenlinnan Jalkapalloseura | |
| 5. | FC Honka | Espoo | FC Honka | |
| 6. | Ilves/2 | Tampere | Tampereen Ilves/2 | |
| 7. | NJS | Nurmijärvi | Nurmijärven Jalkapalloseura | |
| 8. | MuSa | Musa, Pori | Musan Salama | |
| 9. | P-Iirot | Rauma | Pallo-Iirot | |
| 10. | ÅIFK | Turku | Åbo IFK | Promoted from Kolmonen |

=== Kakkonen Group C ===
| No. | Abbreviated Name | Town or Settlement | Official Club and Team Name | Movements from 2025 |
|---|---|---|---|---|
| 1. | GBK | Kokkola | Gamlakarleby Bollklubb | |
| 2. | Hercules | Oulu | Jalkapalloseura Hercules | |
| 3. | Huima/Urho | Äänekoski | Äänekosken Huima | Promoted from Kolmonen |
| 4. | FF Jaro/Akademi | Jakobstad | Fotbollsföreningen Jaro/Akademi | Promoted from Kolmonen |
| 5. | JBK | Jakobstad | Jakobstads Bollklubb | |
| 6. | Närpes Kraft | Närpes | Närpes Kraft Fotbollsförening | |
| 7. | SJK Akatemia/2 | Seinäjoki | SJK Akatemia/2 | |
| 8. | TP-47 | Tornio | Tornion Pallo-47 | |
| 9. | FC Vaajakoski | Vaajakoski, Jyväskylä | Football Club Vaajakoski | |
| 10. | VPS Akatemia | Vaasa | VPS Akatemia | |

All details taken from Finnish FA website.

== Seasons – League Tables ==
| 1970s: | | | | 1973 | 1974 | 1975 | 1976 | 1977 | 1978 | 1979 |
| 1980s: | 1980 | 1981 | 1982 | 1983 | 1984 | 1985 | 1986 | 1987 | 1988 | 1989 |
| 1990s: | 1990 | 1991 | 1992 | 1993 | 1994 | 1995 | 1996 | 1997 | 1998 | 1999 |
| 2000s: | 2000 | 2001 | 2002 | 2003 | 2004 | 2005 | 2006 | 2007 | 2008 | 2009 |
| 2010s: | 2010 | 2011 | 2012 | 2013 | 2014 | 2015 | 2016 | 2017 | 2018 | 2019 |
| 2020s: | 2020 | 2021 | 2022 | 2023 | 2024 | 2025 | 2026 | | | |

== Group Winners ==
1970–1972 II divisioona, Tier 2

| Year | East Group | West Group | North Group |
|---|---|---|---|
| 1970 | MiPK | TPV | VPS |
| 1971 | Ponnistus | TaPa | KPT |
| 1972 | Ponnistus | I-Kissat | OTP |

1973–1993 II divisioona, Tier 3

| Year | East Group | West Group | North Group |
|---|---|---|---|
| 1973 | HPS | TuTo | KaPa |
| 1974 | LaPS | Pyrkivä | Sport |
| 1975 | KIF | MuSa | KPS |
| 1976 | FinnPa | IFK Mariehamn | Into |
| 1977 | KTP | GrIFK | OLS |
| 1978 | Honka | LappBK | RoPS |
| 1979 | LaPa | RPallo | Jaro |
| 1980 | Elo | FinnPa | JyP-77 |
| 1981 | Ponnistus | GrIFK | KePS |
| 1982 | HPS | PPT | Huima |
| 1983 | Karpalo | P-Iirot | KaPa |
| 1984 | LauTP | HPK | KajHa |
| 1985 | TPV | KontU | PK-37 |
| 1986 | GrIFK | VaKP | KaPa |
| 1987 | VanPa | TuTo | Jaro |
| 1988 | KumuP | TuPa | PK-37 |
| 1989 | JoKu | GrIFK | TP-55 |
| 1990 | FinnPa | P-Iirot | OLS |
| 1991 | VanPa | TPV | VPS |
| 1992 | Ponnistus | P-Iirot | KajHa |
| 1993 | KTP | PIF | FC 1991 |

1994-2023 Kakkonen, Tier 3

| Year | South Group | East Group | West Group | North Group |
|---|---|---|---|---|
| 1994 | K-Team | Rakuunat | PP-70 | GBK |
| 1995 | HIK | TiPS | TP-Seinäjoki | OPS |
| 1996 | PK-35 | VarTP | Kraft | KPT-85 |
| 1997 | Atlantis | Kultsu | KPV-j | KajHa |
| 1998 | TiPS | RiPS | MuSa | KuPS |
| 1999 | FC Hämeenlinna | Rakuunat | ÅIFK | Tervarit |
| 2000 | Gnistan | FC Kuusankoski | SalPa | TP-47 |
| 2001 | Viikingit | KooTeePee | VG-62 | KoMu |
| 2002 | FC Espoo | WJK | TPV | OLS |
| 2003 | PK-35 | Kings | P-Iirot | PS Kemi |
| 2004 | Atlantis | JJK | FJK | KPV |
| 2005 | Klubi 04 | JIPPO | SalPa | VIFK |

| Year | A-Group | B-Group | C-Group |
|---|---|---|---|
| 2006 | JJK | TPV | GBK |
| 2007 | KäPa | GrIFK | PS Kemi |
| 2008 | Klubi 04 | PoPa | Kiisto |
| 2009 | MP | FC Espoo | OPS-jp |
| 2010 | HIFK | Ilves | Santa Claus |
| 2011 | Klubi 04 | BK-46 | SJK |

| Year | South Group | East Group | West Group | North Group |
|---|---|---|---|---|
| 2012 | ÅIFK | JäPS | Ilves | AC Kajaani |
| 2013 | EIF | HIFK | FC Jazz | PS Kemi |
| 2014 | EIF | Atlantis | VIFK | PS Kemi |
| 2015 | FC Honka | Klubi 04 | GrIFK | KPV |

| Year | A-Group | B-Group | C-Group |
|---|---|---|---|
| 2016 | Gnistan | FC Honka | Oulun Palloseura |
| 2017 | KTP | FC Viikingit | AC Kajaani |
| 2018 | MYPA | MuSa | TPV |
| 2019 | Mikkelin Palloilijat | IF Gnistan | SJK Akatemia |
| 2020 | PK-35 | Klubi 04 | JIPPO |
| 2021 | JäPS | Pargas IF | SJK Akatemia |
| 2022 | KäPa | SalPa | JJK |
| 2023 | JIPPO | EPS | OLS |

2024- Kakkonen, Tier 4

| Year | A-Group | B-Group | C-Group |
|---|---|---|---|
| 2024 | Reipas | Inter Turku 2 | GBK Kokkola |
| 2025 | Honka | Ilves/2 | VPS Akatemia |
