= FC Kuusysi =

Finnish football club

- Full name: FC Kuusysi
- Nickname: Kyykkä
- Founded: 1934; 92 years ago
- Ground: Kisapuisto, Lahti
- Capacity: 4,400
- Chairman: Keijo Uutela
- Manager: Kari Teräväinen
- League: Kolmonen
- 2020: TBD
Home colours	Away colours

FC Kuusysi ([ˈkuːs̠ys̠i]; Finnish for FC sixty-nine) is a football club in Lahti, Finland. Its men's team is currently playing in the fourth tier of Finnish football (Kolmonen), and its women's team is playing in Kakkonen. The homeground of FC Kuusysi is Lahden kisapuisto.

== Synopsis ==
The club was founded in 1934 with the name Lahden Pallo-Miehet ('Lahti Ball Men'). It used this name until 1963, when the name was changed into Upon Pallo, having by then a connection with UPO, a white goods company from Lahti. Six years later (1969) the name was again changed, into Lahti-69, which soon was moulded into Kuusysi ('sixty-nine'). When this later was adopted as the official name of the club, it was natural that another nickname soon came to be used, this time Kyykkä.

The club has won five men's Finnish championships, four times when the top flight was still called Mestaruussarja, and once during Veikkausliiga. It has also twice won the Finnish Cup. Their best result in European competitions is the quarterfinals of the 1985–86 European Cup.

After the 1996 season, the men's team merged with that of Reipas Lahti, giving rise to the current club FC Lahti.

In 9 September, 2024, after signed a merger agreement, whereby the operations of Reipas Lahti and Kuusysi will be transferred to FC Lahti, the club was announced, that it will henceforth be known as FC Lahti/69.

== History ==
=== Founding of the club ===
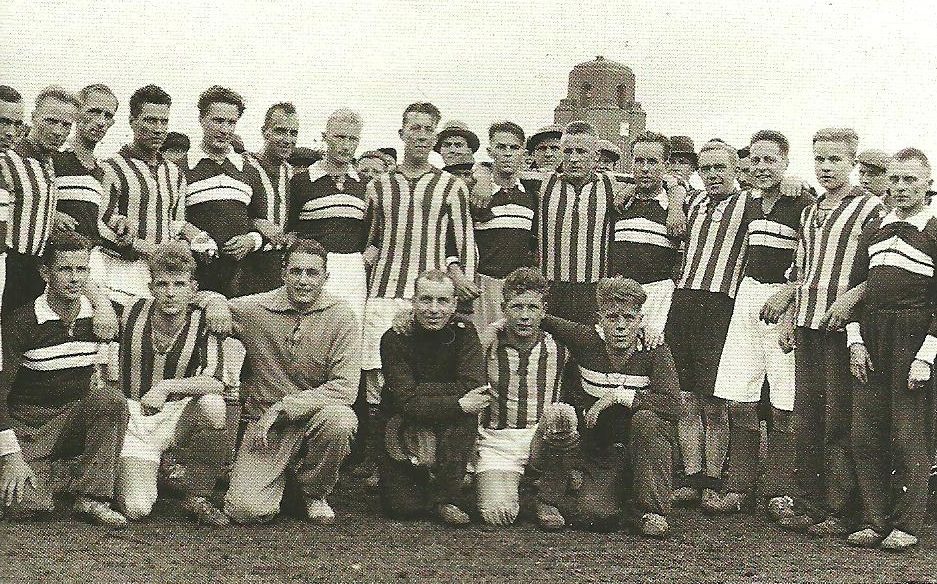
Maila-Pojat and Heinolan Isku join in a photo in 1935.

The first club to begin to play football in Lahti was Lahden Ahkera (founded 1907), which started its team in 1908. However, they had little activity during the first years, and the team really picked up only after the independence of Finland in 1917. In 1922, Ahkera played its first official match, in which it lost to the Kouvolan Urheilijat Ball Men, the score being 1–3. In 1931 Ahkera decided to begin a separate section for football, after which football activity in the vicinity began to pick up, when Ahkera played against the other clubs of the town. Three years later the pressure for founding a specialised club for football began to increase, and thus in the spring of 1934 there was a meeting in a café called Häme in Lahti, in which a proper football club was founded. After a meeting that lasted two hours, a new club was founded, with the name Lahden Pallo-Miehet ('Lahti Ball Men'). The newly founded club decided to put special emphasis on football propaganda directed at boys.

Lahden Pallo-Miehet played its first official match in July 1934 against Heinolan Isku. It ended in a goalless draw, in front of some 500–600 spectators. In August, the club faced the third team of Helsingin Palloseura of Helsinki and lost to them, the score being 10–1. However, in the next match the club met with its first victory. A year after its founding, the club already had 300 members, although this figure also included those who played bandy, which was the winter sport of the club.

=== First medal achieved with boys' A team ===
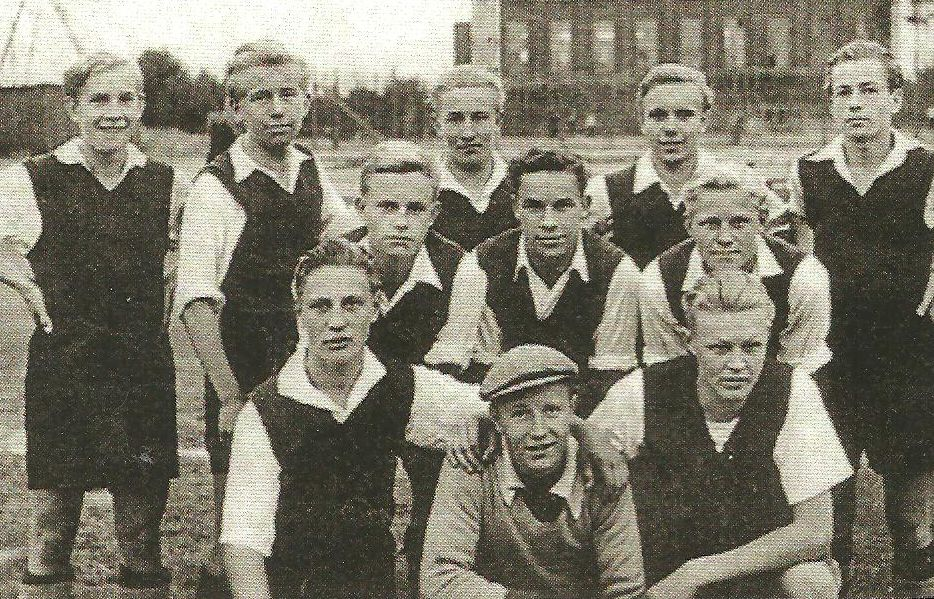
Upon Pallo A boys (U 19) medal winning team from 1948.

For the 1936 season, the Pallo-Miehet team was given a face lift, in that it now consisted of younger players than before. Soon the previous dismal results gave way to losses in matches in which the team did have a chance, and it also achieved a few wins. For the 1939 season, it was decided to expand the Suomensarja, or second level of football in Finland, and Pallo-Miehet was accepted into this competition. The club participated in the Western section, group 2, of this competition, where it played 12 matches and finished sixth, second from bottom. In the twelve matches, the team managed to win two, both of them against Heinolan Isku from neighbouring Heinola. After the Winter War, the number of the teams was reduced, and Pallo-Miehet was left outside of the competition.

Although the men's team thereafter did not compete in the top level competitions in the country, the club had success in A boys' (U 19) competition. In the 1948 season, the Finnish championship for this age group was decided in a cup format competition. The team of Pallo-Miehet, called the Maila-Pojat ('bat boys'), won its matches in the early rounds against a team from Käpylä, a Helsinki residential neighbourhood, and against Myllykosken Pallo. In the semi-finals, faced HJK Helsinki, a match that they won 1–0 on penalties. The final was played in Pori, against the local club Porin Kärpät. Maila-Pojat already had a 0–2 lead, but in the end they lost with a scoreline of 4–2. The men's team in the meanwhile had found themselves in a play-off match about relegation from the provincial series to a district series, and it was decided to let the A boys' (U 19) team try their hand, in an attempt to see if they would do better than the men's team. The boys lost by one goal, and thus the Pallo-Miehet men's team was relegated to the a district series.

Pallo-Miehet expected that the A boys would eventually propel the club into success in men's competitions, but this did not happen. The A boys' (U 19) team soon disintegrated, and the key players joined Reipas Lahti, now relocated from Viipuri, as that club had been promoted into 1950 Suomensarja. However, this turned out to be only a French visit, and ended in relegation, and at the same time, Maila-Pojat were not able to achieve a promotion to the provincial series. However, in 1955 they at last did succeed in this.

=== Promotion into Suomensarja ===
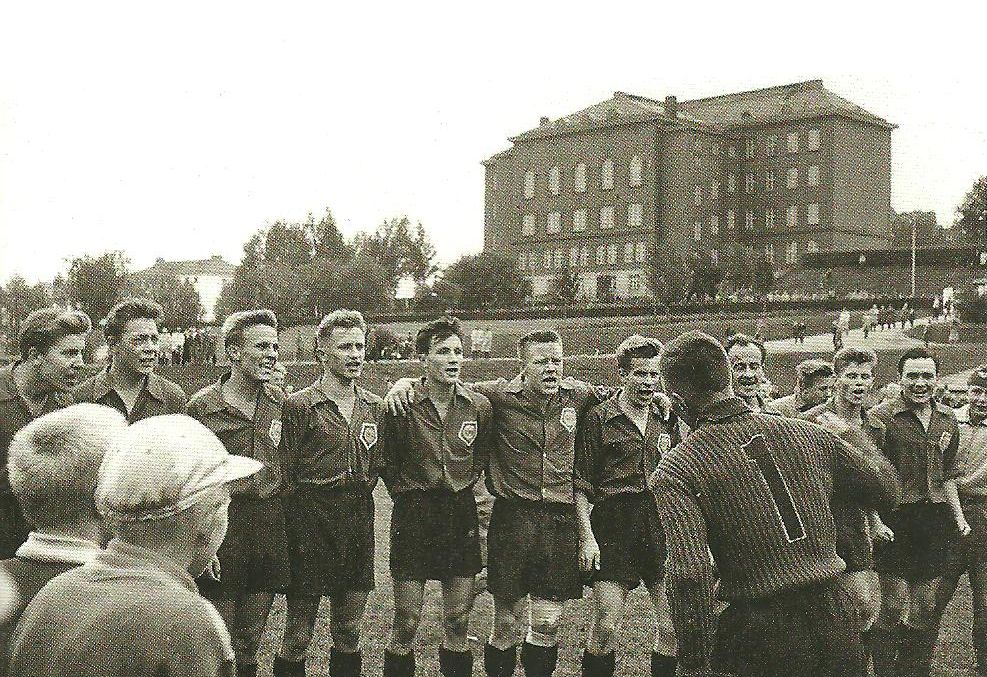
The Upon Pallo team that achieved promotion to Suomensarja, after their match against HPK.

The manager of the Finland national football team, Kurt Weinreich joined the coaching team of Pallo-Miehet before the 1957 season. Under Weinreich's influence, less emphasis was put on fielding strikers, and the season began with clear victories. During the last round of matches, Pallo-Miehet faced HPK of Hämeenlinna. HPK only needed a draw in order to gain promotion, whereas only a win would do for Pallo-Miehet. The match ended with 2–1 for the Lahti team, which thus was promoted to 1958 Suomensarja.

After the promotion into the Suomensarja, the president of the club announced that the next goal was promotion into the Mestaruussarja, i.e. 'Championship Series.' However, during the following season, the club fielded mostly minors in the men's team, and did not acquire players from any other sources. At the end of the season, the club was left seventh in the series, and was the last team to avoid relegation. However, during the seasons that followed, the Pallo-Miehet was consistently found to be one of the best teams in the series. After the 1959 season, Pallo-Miehet was transferred to the eastern section of Suomensarja, instead of the western section, where their local rivals Reipas Lahti also played. Both teams were among the best in this competition, and at the end of the season Reipas achieved promotion into the Mestaruussarja. In the 1962 and 1963 seasons, Pallo-Miehet came second in the eastern section, but they did not gain promotion into the Mestaruussarja.

=== Financial difficulties and evolving into Upon Pallo ===
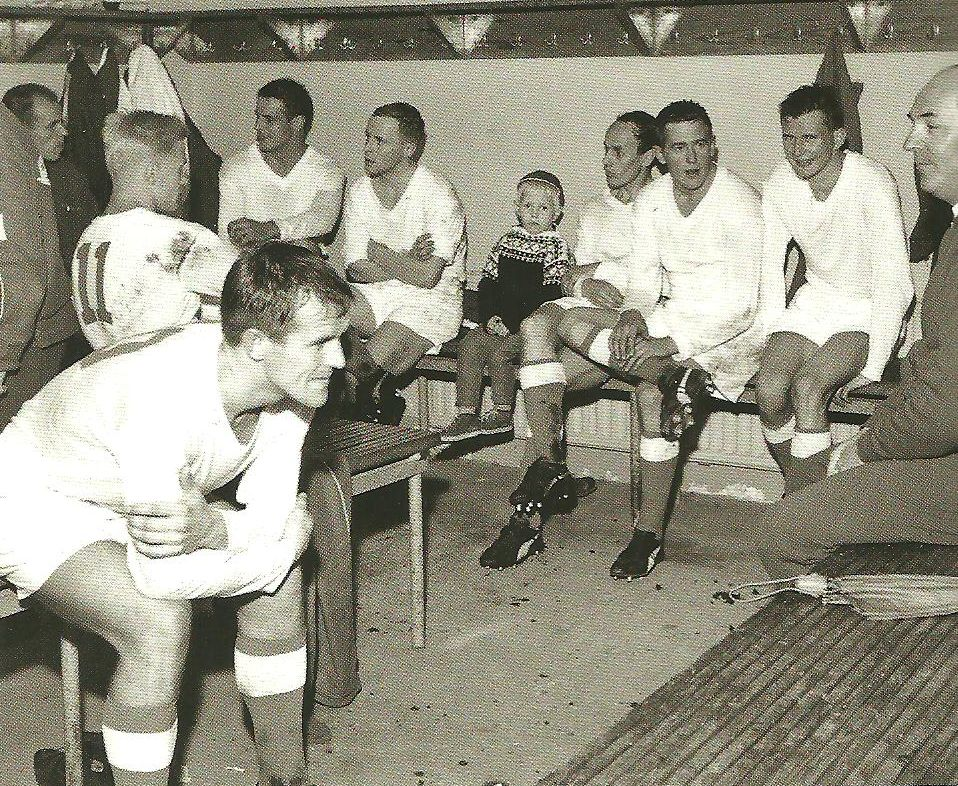
The Upon Pallo team in the 1964 season. The team during half-time in one of the decisive matches of the season.

Although the club had considerable success in sports, it found itself in great financial difficulties. In the autumn of 1963, the debts of the club had reached 11 000 Finnish Marks. This situation grew worse due to the clubs activities in ice hockey, which it had begun at the beginning of that decade, and it was suggested that the club abandon this sport. Pallo-Miehet then turned to the white goods company UPO, and after some negotiations, the company decided to overtake the club in October 1963. In the following month the name of the club was changed into Upon Pallo.

The support from UPO made it possible for the club to acquire some well-known names in Finnish football. These included e.g. the Finnish internationals Markku Kumpulampi and Rauno Kestilä. Also some well established players from Suomensarja joined the club. The new club began the 1964 Suomensarja with a 3–0 victory over Pallo-Pojat, and it went on undefeated until the 13th match of the season. This proved to be the only defeat of the season, and the club secured promotion to 1965 Mestaruussarja in September, when it drew against Herttoniemen Urheilijat. Upon Pallo won its section with a 13-point marginal against the second team in the competition, Sudet from Kouvola.

Under the auspices of UPO, the boys' teams attracted many young players, and in consequence some of them made into the national teams of their age groups. The men's team acquired Finnish international goalkeeper Lars Näsman. In the end the club was left to the relegation zone as the last team to be relegated.

For the next season, the club acquired numerous Finnish internationals, e.g. Simo Syrjävaara, Reijo Kanerva, Matti Mäkelä and Pertti Mäkipää. Thanks to these new players, the team won 18 matches and was undefeated, and thus secured promotion back into the Mestaruussarja.

However, the club was being criticised about this policy of acquiring new players. The basis of this criticism was that the club would have found players from its own ranks, and yet new players were imported who might even play in a position in which there was no need for new players. Some of these players did not play for the team but rather displayed their individual skills. In spite of everything, Upon Pallo ended up fourth in the 1967 Mestaruussarja. Reipas Lahti were crowned champions, and the biggest ever crowd of spectators were seen in the match between Upon Pallo and Reipas. This match, which ended in a defeat for Upon Pallo was attended by 8 144 spectators. The following season Upon Pallo had a number of younger players in its team, and some of the international players were transferred elsewhere. The 1967 season saw varying results, but in the end the team finished sixth in the series. In October the club played its last match with the name Upon Pallo, against Kotkan Työväen Palloilijat of Kotka.

=== A short merger with Reipas ===
The expenses of Upon Pallo were constantly on the increase, which is why UPO wanted to disband the club. At the same time, Reipas was also experiencing financial difficulties, and this situation caused the two clubs to consider a merger. The working name for the club was Lahti-68. In the end, the people involved in backing Reipas did not like this, and they persuaded CEO, Councillor of Mining Arvi Tammivuori of Asko-Upo to let the name of the new club to remain Reipas. This is what then happened, and many people in Upon Pallo decided not to join the new club, as they felt that the people in Reipas were in fact just trying to get rid of their local rival. The main coach of the new club was Raimo Valtonen. Five players from Upon Pallo joined the new club, but many of their fellow players refused to follow them. These players continued their careers in a new club, which was founded to continue the activities of Upon Pallo. This new club was founded just a month before the 1969 Mestaruussarja ('Championship Series') began, and it was given the name Lahti-69. In colloquial speech this turned into Kuusysi. This nickname became the official name of the club in 1974.

Lahti-69 was given the place of Upon Pallo in top-flight football, and the new club did not have the financial burdens Upon Pallo. Eero Nopsanen became the manager of the new club. Football was now the only sport of this club, as ice hockey was not adopted. However, from the point of view of performance, the first season did not meet the club's expectations. Lahti-69 was only tenth in the series, and the last club to cling onto its place in the Mestaruussarja. After this season, the merger with Reipas was officially dissolved, and Lahti-69 and Reipas were again separate clubs.

The 1971 season was the first one when Kuusysi did better than Reipas. During this season, Kuusysi was not able to field Hannu Hämäläinen ja Urho Partanen, because Reipas demanded a quarantine fee of 20 000 for them, which Kuusysi could not afford to pay. This was first season, when Kuusysi took the lead in the series. However, any hopes of a gold were buried in September, when the club drew with Kokkolan Palloveikot. At the end of the season Kuusysi failed to focus on its matches properly, when they had lost sight of their goal, and in the end they finished sixth.

=== Relegation from top flight ===
During the 1972 and 1973 seasons the most important players of the club either ended their careers or transferred to other clubs, and Kuusysi was not able to acquire adequate replacements. In the autumn of 1973 the management of the club decided to let almost all of the players go, except for their biggest star, Raimo Saviomaa. It was decided instead to bring promising but inexperienced young players from its own ranks into the men's team.

During the whole of the ensuing 1974 season, Kuusysi stayed near the bottom of the table. Before the last matches, they faced the situation, in which their best prospect was a possible replay about staying in the series, guaranteed only by a win in an away game. However, the season ended in a defeat in the hands of Mikkelin Palloilijat, 1–0, and thus Kuusysi was relegated to 1. Division.

The following season in the second tier did not begin well, since the best players had abandoned the club, and only Saviomaa and the younger players were left. The club was not able to acquire new good players, when the numbers of the spectators at the same time dwindled. However, the various boys' teams of the club did well, as two of them won the Finnish championship in 1975. Now, when Reipas was the only top-flight club in Lahti, Kuusysi contemplated even abolishing its men's team in the autumn of 1976. This, however, did not happen. Towards the end of the 1970s, the various boys' teams of the club won several medals in their competitions. The C-boys (U–16) team even won gold in 1979.

=== Promotion into the Mestaruussarja under Voutilainen ===
In the autumn of 1979, the club acquired a new manager, Keijo Voutilainen. Prior to this, he had achieved promotion into the Mestaruussarja with Kuopion Pallotoverit of Kuopio. Under Voutilainen, Kuusysi became known for being a young team that passed the ball skilfully and beautifully. However, the results were disappointing at first, and after six matches in the 1980 season, the club was at the bottom of the table. Voutilainen was already wanting to quit, but the management of the club succeeded in persuading him to stay. After the sixth match, the team began to catch up with the leading teams. Voutilainen gave more playing time to the young players, and in addition to them, two players better known from ice hockey, Kari Eloranta and Harri Toivanen played in the team. In the end, the club finished fourth in the series, and were granted a place in the promotion/relegation group, where it was decided which teams would play in the Mestaruussarja the following season. In the promotion/relegation group Kuusysi finished fifth, when only the first four qualified for the 1981 Mestaruussarja.

In the 1981 season Kuusysi won the Preliminary Stage of 1. Division and again qualified for the promotion/relegation group, in which the club ended at the very top. The club also reached the final of the Finnish Cup, where it played against Helsingin Jalkapalloklubi. The match ended in a comprehensive 4–0 victory for HJK.

=== Success in the 1980s ===
Kuusysi started the 1982 Mestaruussarja with high hopes, since it had been able to acquire some high quality players. In the Preliminary Stage, the team stayed close to the leading teams, and in the end finished sixth. In the Championship Stage the other teams were not able to keep up the pace, whereas Kuusysi's results got better and better. Winning the next to last match against Kokkolan Palloveikot, the club climbed to the top. In the last match Kuusysi played against Ilves of Tampere, and won this match 5–0. Thus the club earned its first Finnish championship.

During this decade, financial backing came from businessman Martti Rinta, who in 1982 paid all the debts of the club, which amounted to 600 000 Finnish marks.

Thanks to its success in the Finnish cup in the previous season, Kuusysi was granted a place in the 1982–83 European Cup Winners' Cup, while HJK represented Finland in the 1982–83 European Cup. In the first round Kuusysi faced Galatasaray from Turkey. The first leg ended in a win for Galatasaray, and in the second leg the result was a draw. Kuusysi lost 2–3 on aggregate.

At home in Finland, Kuusysi was fourth in the 1983 Mestaruussarja Preliminary Stage, but in the Championship Stage ended up fifth.

During that decade Kuusysi participated a number of times in European competitions. 1983–84 European Cup was the first time in this competition. In the first round Kuusysi faced Dinamo București, losing 0–1 at home and 0–3 away.

At home in the 1984 Mestaruussarja the club fared better, finishing third in the Preliminary Stage. The rest of the competition was played in a knock-out fashion, and in the semi-finals Kuusysi faced FC Haka of Valkeakoski. They won 3–2 on aggregate and faced TPS Turku in the finals. When the first leg ended in a 4–0 win and the second leg ended in a draw, it was time for Kuusysi to celebrate their second Finnish championship.

In the following season, in the 1984–85 European Cup Winners' Cup, Kuusysi faced FK Inter Bratislava in the first round. When the first leg ended in a 2–1 win for Bratislava and the second leg in a goalless draw, Kuusysi was eliminated 2–1 on aggregate.

At home in the 1985 Mestaruussarja the club did not do as well as the previous season, and it ended up fifth in the Preliminary Stage and thus they were the first teams left outside the play-offs.

The greatest success for Kuusysi in Europe took place in the 1985–86 European Cup. This was the second time in the prime European club competition. In the first round the club faced FK Sarajevo, winning 2–1 both home and away, and thus 4–2 on aggregate. In the next round they faced FC Zenit of Leningrad. They took an early lead, but were not able to keep the opponents at bay, and lost 2–1. At home, however, they won 3–1, and thus 4–3 on aggregate and made the last eight, i.e. the quarterfinals. In the draw for the last eight, they were sent against Steaua București. This was a disappointment for the team, as Steaua was virtually unknown in Finland, and they could have faced some much more famous teams. The first leg in Bucharest ended in a goalless draw. Steaua was the dominant team, but goalkeeper Ismo Korhonen kept the opponents at bay. The club decided to play the second leg at the Helsinki Olympic Stadium, even though there was already snow on the ground. It was played in front of lopulta 32 552 spectators, which was the record amount for any Finnish club. The match went on goalless until the very last minutes, when Steaua's Victor Pițurcă managed to score. Kuusysi had to play without Keijo Kousa, who was injured. Ismo Lius and Markus Törnvall did not play either, because the club had been forced to sell them before these matches. Thanks to this success, the club was able to pay 2 million Finnish marks worth of debts, when the total amount had been 2,3 million.

At home in Finland, the 1986 Mestaruussarja ended in another championship for Kuusysi.

The 1987 Mestaruussarja ended with Kuusysi achieving silver. They were three points behind champions HJK Helsinki. At the end of the year Voutilainen was sacked, and a new manager, Antti Muurinen was brought in, although initially the club had approached Martti Kuusela. Before he was sacked, Voutilainen had stated that he was disappointed in the team, and after that the club decided that Voutilainen's best years as a manager were already in the past. The club was experiencing pressures in local competition, when Reipas was performing better with a young, promising player named Jari Litmanen.

In the European season 1987–1988 Kuusysi participated in the European Cup. In the first round the club faced Neuchâtel Xamax and lost 2–6 on aggregate. At home in the 1987 Mestaruussarja Kuusysi was again second in the Preliminary Stage, and again behind HJK. In the Championship Stage the club remained in the same position and thus were awarded silver at the end of the season.

In the 1987 Finnish Cup, however, the club was victorious, and thus they represented Finland in the 1988–89 European Cup Winners' Cup. The results were disappointing, as the club lost in the first round to Dinamo București.

For the 1989 Mestaruussarja season Muurinen was able to put together the team he wanted. The club had a winning streak of 16 games, and they secured the championship in their last game, against TPS Turku before 7 000 spectators.

=== Financial difficulties in the 1990s and the founding of FC Lahti ===
In 1990 the Mestaruussarja was discontinued and in its stead the current top-flight competition, Veikkausliiga, was founded. During the first season Kuusysi won the preliminary stage and in the play-offs they advanced into the finals, where they met HJK, but lost both legs. During the following season Kuusysi won the championship, with a one-point gap separating them and the second place team Mikkelin Palloilijat. The championship was secured in the last game, in which Kuusysi beat HJK.

In the 1991–92 UEFA Cup Kuusysi faced in the first round Liverpool, which had just been freed from a long European ban. The first leg ended in a 6–1 defeat at Anfield, but Kuusysi won at home 1–0.

For the 1992 season Kuusysi acquired the league topscorer of the previous season, Kimmo Tarkkio. He played as a striker together with Mike Belfield. HJK ended up as the champions, and Kuusysi won silver. This proved to be the last medal for the club. In December 1992, businessman Martti Rinta, who had financed the club, died. According to his own estimates Rinta had spent several million Finnish Marks on the club. Before he died, Rinta had e.g. paid the remaining 600 000 Mark debt. After Rinta's death the budget of the club had to be rewritten.

During the 1993 season Kuusysi had plenty of ups and downs, but with a spurt at the end, the club managed to achieve a fourth position. However, for the club this was the first season without a medal for seven years.

The 1993–1994 was the last time that Kuusysi participated in European competitions, this time in the UEFA Cup. In the first round they beat KSV Waregem from Belgium with an aggregate score of 6–1. In the second round they faced Brøndby IF from Denmark, and lost with an aggregate score of 2–7.

After this season, manager Muurinen left the club, even though he had a year left of his contract. Jorma Kallio took his place. This move was dictated by financial reasons, and at the same time many of the players either ended their careers or transferred to other clubs. These players were replaced by young players from the club's own ranks. The most important of these young hopefuls were Marko Tuomela and Antti Pohja. Tuomela had already played in the men's team before.

For the 1994 season Kuusysi acquired its first Brazilian players. The team lacked a clear direction, and e.g. for goalkeeping the club tried three different players, of whom Mikko Kavén finally turned out to be the best choice. At the end of the season, the club was ninth in the league. The following season was the last one for the club in top-flight football. The foreign players were often injured, and when the club found itself lower and lower in the league table, they decided to acquire more new players. These acquisitions were done despite the grim financial situation, and altogether 33 players represented the club during this season. Relegation was a fact after a 1–0 defeat at the hands of Rovaniemen Palloseura in October. During the 1996 season the club played in Ykkönen, in its northern section. The club aimed to return to top flight, but in the end they found themselves in the third place in their section.

The debts of the club now had risen to one million Finnish Marks, and also local rivals Reipas, likewise now relegated to Ykkönen, was in financial difficulties, and they had no way of achieving promotion back to top flight. There had already earlier in the decade been suggestions about a merger of these two clubs. Now this proposition was reconsidered. FC Lahti was suggestion for a new name, and at the same time it was considered that Kuusysi and Reipas would concentrate in youth work, and it was also suggested that FC Lahti would pay the debts of these two clubs according to a certain timetable. Kuusysi was the first to accept these suggestions, but it took longer for Reipas to be persuaded. Finally in November 1996, FC Lahti was officially founded. The new club was given Kuusysi's place in Ykkönen, and FC Pallo-Lahti took the place of Reipas in Kakkonen.

=== Return to men's competitions ===
The Lahti club FC City Stars became part of the Kuusysi organisation in the autumn of 2006 (see Other teams) and it played in Kakkonen during the seasons 2007–2008 and in 2010.

In the 2011 season Kuusysi returned to men's competitions with its own name and colours, taking the place of the City Stars in Kakkonen.

== The club ==
=== Colours and logos ===
When Lahden Pallo-Miehet was founded, the official colours were black shorts and an orange jersey, with a black horizontal stripe. When the club's name was changed to Upon Pallo, the colours also were changed. The new colours were blue and white. In the 1990s the club also used yellow jerseys and blue shorts. During the last season in top flight, the team had black shorts. The current logo was designed for the 1971 season by Tuulo Lehtinen.

=== Stadium ===
The club began to play in 1934 at the Lahti Radiomäki ('Lahti Radio Hill'), where there was the Radiomäki Sports Ground. From there the club moved to Lahden kisapuisto. For a short while, the club also played at the Lahti Stadium, but it soon returned to Kisapuisto.

When the club played in the 1985–86 European Cup against FC Steaua Bucharest, they did so at the Helsinki Olympic Stadium.

During the second last season in Ykkönen, the club played at the Lahden kisapuisto stadium. The capacity of the Kisapuisto is currently 3 500 spectators.

In 1981, the city boasted with the first full size football hall, the Lahti suurhalli, which made it possible for footballers to practise during the winter.

=== Other teams ===
Kuusysi became well known for its good work with youth teams. During 1975–1982 the club's youth teams won 16 medals in the series they played. In addition to this, young footballers from Kuusysi played in the boys' and girls' national teams. When the men's team was discontinued, all resources were concentrated in the youth teams. In 2001 Kuusysi was awarded the "Young Finland Seal" for its youth work.

In 1977 a sister club, Palloseiskat ('Little Sevens') was founded, so that those youngsters, who did not make the first team, could have a chance to play. At the same time, the youth work was assigned to a section of its own, which made it easier to run the club and to its economic side.

The women's team was started in the autumn of 1971. Three years later the financial situation of the club got worse, and the women's team was transferred to Lahden Sampo. In the 1980s and 1990s the Kuusysi Women's Team played on five occasions in top-flight women's football in Finland, but each time they were relegated back to Women's Ykkönen. The latest promotion to the Women's League took place in 2007. However this stint in top flight in 2008 again ended in relegation.

==== FC City Stars ====
In 2001 FC Lahti had discontinued its second team, FC Pallo-Lahti. Both Kuusysi and Reipas wanted to have a team that would play in Kakkonen, so that those young players who were too old for the youth teams would have a team in which to play. However, during that year FC Lahti showed a loss, and they could not finance the operation of this kind of a team. Therefore, in the autumn of 2006, Kuusysi incorporated another Lahti team the FC City Stars into its functions. FC Lahti and FC City Stars made a farm team contract, and thus FC City Stars acquired a number of players with experience from top-flight Finnish football. The contract at first was to last until 2008, but the clubs decided to extend it further. City Stars was discontinued in 2010, when Kuusysi took its place in men's competitions.

=== Rivalries ===
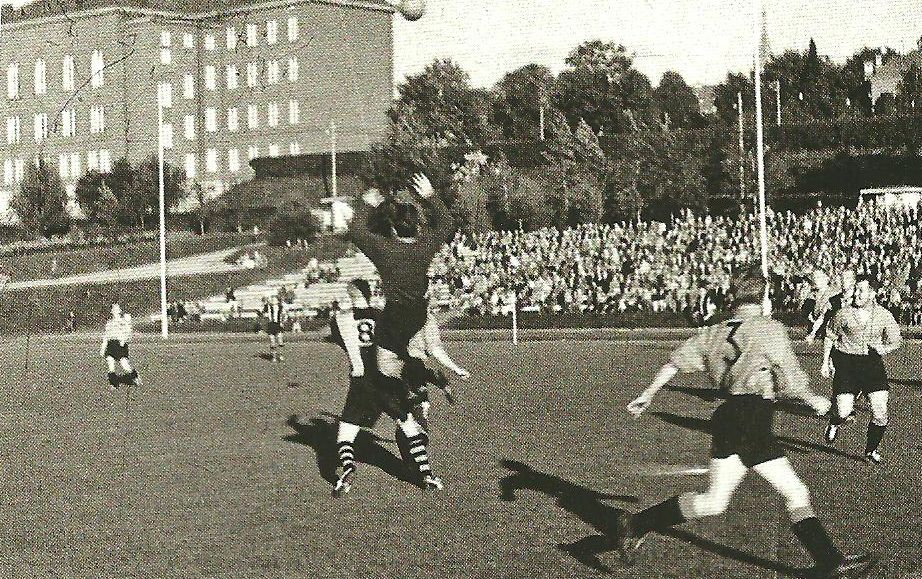
A match between Pallo-Miehet and Reipas in 1960.

In the eyes of its supporters, the main rival for Kuusysi was the other big club from Lahti, Reipas. The Lahti derbies were always great events. In the 1980s, however, Kuusysi was so much better, and therefore the players did not get too excited about these matches. For them it was more important to play when they faced HJK Helsinki.

=== Finnish internationals ===
The following list consists of players who have played for Kuusysi boys' or men's teams and have later played in the Finnish national team.

- Mika Aaltonen
- Juha Annunen
- Kari Arkivuo
- Tuomas Haapala
- Pekka Hieta
- Raimo Hukka
- Jyrki Hännikäinen
- Pertti Jantunen
- Hannu Jäntti
- Petri Järvinen
- Reijo Kanerva
- Mikko Kavén
- Rauno Kestilä
- Jari Kinnunen
- Ismo Korhonen
- Keijo Kousa
- Markku Kumpulampi
- Pekka Lagerblom
- Ismo Lius
- Timo Marjamaa
- Mika Motturi
- Ilkka Mäkelä
- Matti Mäkelä
- Pertti Mäkipää
- Lars Näsman
- Petri Pasanen
- Esa Pekonen
- Antti Pohja
- Ilkka Remes
- Jari Rinne
- Jarmo Saastamoinen
- Raimo Saviomaa
- Simo Syrjävaara
- Ilpo Talvio
- Kimmo Tarkkio
- Niklas Tarvajärvi
- Petri Tiainen
- Pentti Toivola
- Marko Tuomela
- Markus Törnvall
- Ossi Vilppunen
- Keijo Voutilainen

== Men's team in the 2016 season ==
Note: Flags indicate national team as defined under FIFA eligibility rules; some limited exceptions apply. Players may hold more than one non-FIFA nationality.

No.	Pos.	Nation	Player
1	GK	FIN	Tom Hellqvist
2	DF	FIN	Janne Hahl
3	DF	FIN	Mikael Salimäki
4	DF	FIN	Patrik Pykälä-Aho
5	DF	FIN	Tino Villgren
6	FW	FIN	Masa Málen
7	FW	FIN	Faton Salihi
8	MF	FIN	Eetu Suoraniemi
9	MF	FIN	Jens Tanskanen
10	FW	FIN	Samuel Mahlamäki Camacho
11	MF	FIN	Burhan Sadik
12	GK	FIN	Miika Mujunen
12	GK	FIN	Santeri Pakkanen *
13	DF	FIN	Paavo Ahola *
14	MF	FIN	Joona Tapani

No.	Pos.	Nation	Player
15	FW	FIN	Robin Saastamoinen
16	MF	FIN	Marko Hyvönen
17	MF	FIN	Ibrahim Köse
18	MF	FIN	Onuray Köse
20	MF	FIN	Kasperi Heinonen
21	FW	FIN	Paavo Voutilainen *
22	MF	FIN	Kasimir Arminen
23	DF	FIN	Nuutti Laaksonen
24	MF	FIN	Roni Mäkelä
26	FW	BRA	Euller *
27	FW	FIN	Justus Kauppinen
28	FW	FIN	Driton Shala *
31	FW	FIN	Jussi Länsitalo *
32	MF	FIN	Adedeyo Omolewa Deji
33	GK	FIN	Roope Järvinen

* Dual Registration with FC Lahti

== Managers ==
Between 1934 and 1952, Kuusysi had several player-managers. Among them were e.g. Erik Tuuha, Juuso Lampila, Veikko Raviniemi and Erkki Kaarivuo. When the club played under the name of Upon Pallo, the directors of the club had the say in who would play for the club, and the managers just had to accept this situation. The most accomplished manager of the club has been Keijo Voutilainen, under whose guidance the club won three Finnish championships.

- 1934–1952: several player-managers
- 1953–1956: (Finland) Jaakko Kerttula
- 1957–1966: (Germany) Kurt Weinreich
- 1967–1968: (Russia) Aleksandr Ponomarjov
- 1969–1970: (Finland) Eero Nopsanen
- 1971–1972: (Finland) Raimo Valtonen
- 1973–1975: (Finland) Aarne Olkkola
- 1976–1978: (Finland) Raimo Valtonen
- 1979: (Finland) Pertti Tiitta
- 1980–1987: (Finland) Keijo Voutilainen
- 1988–1993: (Finland) Antti Muurinen
- 1994–1995: (Finland) Jorma Kallio
- 1996: (Finland) Kari Kangasaho
- 2011–present: (Finland) Petri Järvinen

== Statistics ==
=== Players ===
Most matches in Kuusysi and Upon Pallo

Rank	Name	Years	Matches
1.	Juha Annunen	1982–1983, 1986–1995	311
2.	Ilkka Remes	1982–1993	306
3.	Jari Rinne	1983–1993	277
4.	Keijo Kousa	1982–1993	252
5.	Ismo Korhonen	1982–1991	236
6.	Esa Pekonen	1982–1986, 1990, 1994–1995	188
7.	Hannu Jäntti	1985–1994	181
8.	Ismo Lius	1983–1989, 1993	180
9.	Sami Vehkakoski	1986–1995	178
10.	Raimo Saviomaa	1965–1968, 1970–1974	165

Most goals in Kuusysi and Upon Pallo

Rank	Name	Years	Goals
1.	Ismo Lius	1983–1989, 1993	116
2.	Juha Annunen	1982–1983, 1986–1995	73
3.	Keijo Kousa	1982–1993	56
4.	Kalle Lehtinen	1988–1989, 1991–1993	42
5.	Timo Mäkinen	1965–1973	40
6.	Mike Belfield	1991–1993	36
7.	Petri Järvinen	1989–1993	26
8.	Markku Kumpulampi	1965–1968	24
9.	Kimmo Tarkkio	1992–1994	23
10.	Pentti Toivola	1967–1968	22

* Only Mestaruussarja and Veikkausliiga matches included.

=== Honours ===
- Finnish championship (5)
  - 1982, 1984, 1986, 1989, 1991
- Finnish championship runners-up (silver) (4)
  - 1987, 1988, 1990, 1992
- Finnish Cup (2)
  - 1983, 1987

=== Kuusysi in European competitions ===
Round	Team No. 1	Agg.	Team No. 2	1st leg	2nd leg
1982–83 European Cup Winners' Cup
1 R	Galatasaray (Turkey)	3–2	(Finland) Kuusysi	2–1	1–1
1983–84 European Cup
1 R	Kuusysi (Finland)	0–4	(Romania) Dinamo București	0–1	0–3
1984–85 European Cup Winners' Cup
1 R	Inter Bratislava (Czechoslovakia)	2–1	(Finland) Kuusysi	2–1	0–0
1985–86 European Cup
1 R	Kuusysi (Finland)	4–2	(Socialist Federal Republic of Yugoslavia) FK Sarajevo	2–1	2–1
2 R	Zenit Leningrad (Soviet Union)	3–4	(Finland) Kuusysi	2–1	1–3
QF	Steaua Bucharest (Romania)	1–0	(Finland) Kuusysi	0–0	1–0
1987–88 European Cup
1 R	Neuchâtel Xamax (Switzerland)	6–2	(Finland) Kuusysi	5–0	1–2
1988–89 European Cup Winners' Cup
1 R	Dinamo București (Romania)	6–0	(Finland) Kuusysi	3–0	3–0
1989–90 UEFA Cup
1 R	Kuusysi (Finland)	2–3	(France) Paris Saint-Germain	0–0	2–3
1990–91 European Cup
1 R	Swarovski Tirol (Austria)	7–1	(Finland) Kuusysi	5–0	2–1
1991–92 UEFA Cup
1 R	Liverpool (England)	6–2	(Finland) Kuusysi	6–1	0–1
1992–93 UEFA Champions League
1 R	Kuusysi (Finland)	1–2	(Romania) Dinamo București	1–0	0–2 (a.e.t.)
1993–94 UEFA Cup
1 R	Kuusysi (Finland)	6–1	(Belgium) Waregem	4–0	2–1
2 R	Kuusysi (Finland)	2–7	(Denmark) Brøndby IF	1–4	1–3

*Q = Preliminary round; 1R = First round; 2R = Second round; QF = Quarter-finals; a.e.t. = After extra time

=== Upon Pallo and Kuusysi record on tier 1 and tier 2 in Finland ===
Upon Pallo/Kuusysi record on tier 1 and tier 2 in Finland
Season	Competition	Pld	W	D	L	GF/GA	+/–	P	Pos
1939	Suomensarja	12	2	1	9	13–51	– 38	5	6.
1958	Suomensarja	14	4	0	10	22–49	–27	9	7.
1959	Suomensarja	18	9	2	7	44–38	+ 6	20	5.
1960	Suomensarja	22	13	2	7	57–38	+ 19	28	2.
1961	Suomensarja	22	7	5	10	39–54	– 15	19	9.
1962	Suomensarja	22	13	3	6	61–36	+ 25	29	2.
1963	Suomensarja	22	12	4	6	68–42	+ 26	28	2.
1964	Suomensarja	22	19	2	1	75–18	+ 57	40	1.
1965	Mestaruussarja	22	8	4	10	35–28	+ 7	20	10.
1966	Suomensarja	22	18	4	0	71–18	+ 53	40	1.
1967	Mestaruussarja	22	10	6	6	29–19	+ 10	26	4.
1968	Mestaruussarja	22	10	2	10	41–38	+ 3	22	6.
1969	Mestaruussarja	22	6	3	13	20–41	– 21	15	10.
1970	Mestaruussarja	22	9	1	12	31–38	– 7	19	9.
1971	Mestaruussarja	26	10	9	7	40–29	+ 11	29	6.
1972	Mestaruussarja	22	10	5	7	39–39	± 0	25	6.
1973	Mestaruussarja	22	7	4	11	31–38	– 7	18	8.
1974	Mestaruussarja	22	4	7	11	22–41	– 19	15	11.
1975	Ykkönen	22	7	3	12	31–39	– 8	17	9.
1976	Ykkönen	22	8	5	9	36–39	– 3	21	9.
1977	Ykkönen	22	9	7	6	36–26	+ 10	25	3.
1978	Ykkönen	22	9	1	12	42–45	– 3	19	9.
1979	Ykkönen	22	7	6	9	33–30	+ 3	20	8.
	Ykkönen relegation group	29	13	6	10	58–39	+ 19	32	3.
1980	Ykkönen	22	13	2	7	62–29	+ 33	28	4.
	Mestaruussarja promotion/relegation group	7	3	2	2	16–10	+ 6	9	5.
1981	Ykkönen	22	14	4	4	57–15	+ 42	32	1.
	Mestaruussarja promotion/relegation group	7	4	2	1	17–8	+ 9	14	1.
1982	Mestaruussarja	22	11	3	8	36–26	+ 10	25	6.–
	Championship group	29	16	4	9	49–30	+ 19	24	1.
1983	Mestaruussarja	22	11	6	5	42–21	+ 21	28	4.
	Championship group	29	13	7	9	54–37	+ 17	19	5.
1984	Preliminary stage	22	10	8	4	41–24	+ 17	28	3.
	Championship Playoffs	4	2	1	1	11–5	+ 6		1.
1985	Mestaruussarja	22	13	1	8	47–35	+ 22	27	5.
1986	Mestaruussarja	22	13	6	3	40–20	+ 20	32	1.
1987	Mestaruussarja	22	12	6	4	37–21	+ 16	30	2.
1988	Preliminary stage	22	12	5	5	48–25	+ 23	29	2.
	Championship group	27	14	6	7	57–30	+ 27	34	2.
1989	Preliminary stage	22	13	6	3	44–22	+ 22	32	1.
	Championship group	27	17	7	3	51–23	+ 28	41	1.
1990	Futisliiga Preliminary stage	22	14	5	3	34–12	+ 22	33	1.
	Championship Playoffs	6	4	0	2	10–6	+ 4		2.
1991	Veikkausliiga	33	16	11	6	57–35	+ 22	59	1.
1992	Veikkausliiga	33	19	6	8	61–38	+ 23	63	2.
1993	Veikkausliiga	22	11	3	8	30–34	– 4	36	6.
	Championship Group	29	14	5	10	41–44	– 3	47	4.
1994	Veikkausliiga	26	10	4	12	42–49	– 7	34	9.
1995	1995 Veikkausliiga	26	6	5	15	23–50	– 27	23	13.
1996	Ykkönen	27	16	5	6	48–28	+ 20	53	3.
