= Markus Törnvall =

Finnish former footballer (born 1964)

Personal information
- Date of birth: 31 December 1964 (age 61)
- Place of birth: Nastola, Finland
- Height: 1.84 m (6 ft 0 in)
- Position: Midfielder

Youth career
- Kuusysi

Senior career*
| Years | Team | Apps | (Gls) |
| 1981–1985 | Kuusysi | 91 | (11) |
| 1986 | Haka | 21 | (3) |
| 1987 | Kuusysi | 19 | (0) |
| 1988 | Reipas Lahti | 26 | (9) |
| 1989–1990 | IFK Norrköping | 20 | (0) |
| 1991 | RoPS | 27 | (2) |
| 1992 | Ilves | 12 | (0) |

International career
| 1981 | Finland U16 | 7 | (2) |
| 1982 | Finland U17 | 13 | (2) |
| 1982–1983 | Finland U18 | 9 | (2) |
| 1984–1985 | Finland U21 | 12 | (6) |
| 1984–1989 | Finland | 23 | (1) |
- * Club domestic league appearances and goals

Markus Törnvall (born 31 December 1964) is a Finnish former football player who played as a midfielder. He was capped 23 times for the Finland national team, scoring one goal in 1986. Törnvall won two Finnish championship titles with Kuusysi in 1982 and 1984 and two Finnish Cup titles in 1983 and 1987. In addition, he won the Swedish championship title when playing for IFK Norrköping in 1989.

== Career statistics ==
=== Club ===
Appearances and goals by club, season and competition
| Club | Season | League | | | Europe | | Total | |
| Club | Season | Division | Apps | Goals | Apps | Goals | Apps | Goals |
|---|---|---|---|---|---|---|---|---|
| Kuusysi | 1981 | Ykkönen | 6 | 1 | – | | 6 | 1 |
| Kuusysi | 1982 | Mestaruussarja | 15 | 3 | 2 (Note: Appearances in UEFA Cup Winners' Cup) | 0 | 17 | 3 |
| Kuusysi | 1983 | Mestaruussarja | 23 | 0 | 2 (Note: Appearances in European Cup) | 0 | 25 | 0 |
| Kuusysi | 1984 | Mestaruussarja | 25 | 4 | 1 | 1 | 26 | 5 |
| Kuusysi | 1985 | Mestaruussarja | 22 | 4 | 2 | 0 | 24 | 4 |
| Kuusysi | Total | | 91 | 12 | 7 | 1 | 98 | 13 |
| Haka | 1986 | Mestaruussarja | 21 | 3 | 2 | 1 | 23 | 4 |
| Kuusysi | 1987 | Mestaruussarja | 19 | 0 | 2 | 0 | 21 | 0 |
| Reipas Lahti | 1988 | Mestaruussarja | 26 | 9 | – | | 26 | 9 |
| IFK Norrköping | 1989 | Allsvenskan | 15 | 0 | – | | 15 | 0 |
| IFK Norrköping | 1990 | Allsvenskan | 5 | 0 | – | | 5 | 0 |
| IFK Norrköping | Total | | 20 | 0 | 0 | 0 | 20 | 0 |
| RoPS | 1991 | Veikkausliiga | 27 | 2 | – | | 27 | 2 |
| Ilves | 1992 | Veikkausliiga | 12 | 0 | – | | 12 | 0 |
| Career total | | | 216 | 26 | 11 | 2 | 227 | 28 |

=== International ===
Appearances and goals by national team and year
| National team | Year | Apps | Goals |
|---|---|---|---|
| Finland | 1984 | 2 | 0 |
| Finland | 1985 | 4 | 0 |
| Finland | 1986 | 8 | 1 |
| Finland | 1987 | 1 | 0 |
| Finland | 1988 | 5 | 0 |
| Finland | 1989 | 3 | 0 |
| Total | | 23 | 1 |

Scores and results list Finland's goal tally first, score column indicates score after each Törnvall goal.

List of international goals scored by Markus Törnvall
| No. | Date | Venue | Opponent | Score | Result | Competition |
|---|---|---|---|---|---|---|
| 1. | 24 February 1986 | Al Ahli Stadium, Manama, Bahrain | Bahrain | 2–0 | 4–0 | Friendly |

== Honours ==
Kuusysi

- Mestaruussarja: 1982, 1984
- Finnish Cup: 1983, 1987

IFK Norrköping

- Allsvenskan: 1989
