= Kari Laukkanen =

Finnish footballer (born 1963)

Personal information
- Date of birth: 14 December 1963 (age 62)
- Place of birth: Pielavesi, Finland
- Height: 1.87 m (6 ft 2 in)
- Position: Goalkeeper

Senior career*
Years	Team	Apps	(Gls)
1982–1986	KuPS	105	(0)
1986–1987	Cercle Brugge	24	(0)
1987	KuPS	11	(0)
1987–1990	Stuttgarter Kickers	82	(0)
1990–1995	Waldhof Mannheim	145	(0)
1995–1998	FinnPa	131	(0)
1999	HIK Hanko	9	(0)
1999	RiPS	9	(0)
2000	NJS	1	(0)

International career
1985–1996	Finland	49	(0)

Managerial career
- NJS
- * Club domestic league appearances and goals

Kari Laukkanen (born 14 December 1963) is a Finnish former professional footballer who played as a goalkeeper. During his club career, he notably played for KuPS, Stuttgarter Kickers and Waldhof Mannheim. He also made 49 Appearances for the Finland national team. He is the current coach of NJS Nurmijärvi, playing in Kolmonen as well as goalkeeping coach for Finland's U21 team.

== Career statistics ==
Appearances and goals by club, season and competition
Club	Season	League			Cup (Note: Includes Belgian Cup and DFB-Pokal)		Europe		Total	
Club	Season	Division	Apps	Goals	Apps	Goals	Apps	Goals	Apps	Goals
KuPS	1982	Mestaruussarja	21	0	–		–		21	0
KuPS	1983	Mestaruussarja	20	0	–		–		20	0
KuPS	1984	Mestaruussarja	22	0	–		–		22	0
KuPS	1985	Mestaruussarja	21	0	–		–		21	0
KuPS	1986	Mestaruussarja	21	0	–		–		21	0
KuPS	Total		105	0	0	0	0	0	105	0
Cercle Brugge	1986–87	Belgian First Division	24	0	6	0	–		30	0
KuPS	1987	Mestaruussarja	11	0	–		–		11	0
Stuttgarter Kickers	1987–88	2. Bundesliga	17	0	–		–		18	0
Stuttgarter Kickers	1988–89	Bundesliga	28	0	1	0	–		29	0
Stuttgarter Kickers	1989–90	2. Bundesliga	37	0	2	0	1 (Note: Appearance(s) in UEFA Intertoto Cup)	0	40	0
Stuttgarter Kickers	Total		82	0	3	0	1	0	86	0
Waldhof Mannheim	1990–91	2. Bundesliga	14	0	–		–		14	0
Waldhof Mannheim	1991–92	2. Bundesliga	30	0	2	0	–		32	0
Waldhof Mannheim	1992–93	2. Bundesliga	42	0	2	0	–		44	0
Waldhof Mannheim	1993–94	2. Bundesliga	28	0	–		–		28	0
Waldhof Mannheim	1994–95	2. Bundesliga	31	0	2	0	–		33	0
Waldhof Mannheim	Total		135	0	6	0	0	0	141	0
FinnPa	1995	Veikkausliiga	11	0	–		–		11	0
FinnPa	1996	Veikkausliiga	24	0	–		–		24	0
FinnPa	1997	Veikkausliiga	25	0	–		–		25	0
FinnPa	1998	Veikkausliiga	20	0	–		2 (Note: Appearances in UEFA Cup)	0	22	0
FinnPa	Total		80	0	0	0	2	0	82	0
Hangö IK	1999	Ykkönen	9	0	–		–		9	0
RiPS	1999	Ykkönen	10	0	–		–		10	0
NJS	2005	Kolmonen	1	0	–		–		1	0
Career total			457	0	15	0	3	0	475	0
