= Jari Rinne =

Finnish footballer (born 1964)

Personal information
- Date of birth: 4 May 1964 (age 62)
- Place of birth: Lahti, Finland
- Height: 1.76 m (5 ft 9 in)
- Position: Midfielder

Youth career
- 1975–1982: Kuusysi

Senior career*
Years	Team	Apps	(Gls)
1981–1993	Kuusysi	278	(20)

International career
1984–1985	Finland U21	12	(1)
1986–1992	Finland	15	(0)
- * Club domestic league appearances and goals as of 1 May 2024

Jari Rinne (born 4 May 1964) is a Finnish former professional footballer who played as a midfielder. He was capped 15 times for Finland national football team during 1986–1992.

Born in Lahti, Rinne spent his whole career with FC Kuusysi, a local powerhouse at the time. He won four Finnish championship titles with Kuusysi, and additionally two Finnish Cup championships.

== Career statistics ==
Finland
Year	Apps	Goals
1988	2	0
1989	2	0
1990	6	0
1991	0	0
1992	5	0
Total	15	0

== Honours ==
Kuusysi

- Mestaruussarja: 1984, 1986, 1989
- Veikkausliiga: 1991
- Finnish Cup: 1983, 1987
