= Timo Rahja =

Finnish former footballer (born 1948)

Personal information
- Date of birth: 9 October 1948 (age 78)
- Place of birth: Finland
- Position: Midfielder

Youth career
- Pallo-Pojat

Senior career*
| Years | Team | Apps | (Gls) |
| 1967–1971 | HJK | 71 | (35) |
| 1972 | HIFK | 19 | (9) |
| 1973–1974 | HJK | 33 | (7) |
| 1974–1975 | MVV Maastricht | 10 | (3) |
| 1975–1976 | HJK | 27 | (1) |
| 1977–1978 | OTP | 9 | (0) |

International career
| 1971–1974 | Finland | 7 | (2) |
- * Club domestic league appearances and goals

Timo Rahja (born 9 October 1948) is a Finnish former professional footballer who played as a midfielder. During his career, he represented HJK Helsinki, HIFK and Oulun Työväen Palloilijat in his native Finland, winning the Finnish championship title with HJK in 1973. In total, he made 169 appearances and scored 52 goals in Finnish top-tier Mestaruussarja. He also played one season in Dutch Eredivisie with MVV Maastricht in 1974–75.

He was capped seven times for the Finland national team, scoring two goals in the UEFA Euro 1976 qualifying campaign against Poland and Netherlands.

== Career statistics ==
=== Club ===
Appearances and goals by club, season and competition
| Club | Season | Division | League | | Europe | | Total | |
| Club | Season | Division | Apps | Goals | Apps | Goals | Apps | Goals |
|---|---|---|---|---|---|---|---|---|
| HJK Helsinki | 1967 | Mestaruussarja | 8 | 11 | 2 (Note: Appearances in UEFA Cup Winners' Cup) | 0 | 10 | 11 |
| HJK Helsinki | 1968 | Mestaruussarja | 8 | 4 | – | | 8 | 4 |
| HJK Helsinki | 1969 | Mestaruussarja | 18 | 8 | – | | 18 | 8 |
| HJK Helsinki | 1970 | Mestaruussarja | 21 | 6 | – | | 21 | 6 |
| HJK Helsinki | 1971 | Mestaruussarja | 16 | 6 | – | | 16 | 6 |
| HJK Helsinki | Total | | 71 | 35 | 2 | 0 | 73 | 35 |
| HIFK | 1972 | Mestaruussarja | 19 | 9 | – | | 19 | 9 |
| HJK Helsinki | 1973 | Mestaruussarja | 11 | 0 | – | | 11 | 0 |
| HJK Helsinki | 1974 | Mestaruussarja | 22 | 7 | 3 (Note: Appearances in European Cup) | 1 | 25 | 8 |
| HJK Helsinki | Total | | 33 | 7 | 3 | 1 | 36 | 8 |
| MVV Maastricht | 1974–75 | Eredivisie | 10 | 3 | – | | 10 | 3 |
| HJK Helsinki | 1975 | Mestaruussarja | 9 | 1 | 2 (Note: Appearances in UEFA Cup) | 0 | 11 | 1 |
| HJK Helsinki | 1976 | Mestaruussarja | 18 | 0 | – | | 18 | 0 |
| HJK Helsinki | Total | | 27 | 1 | 2 | 0 | 29 | 1 |
| OTP Oulu | 1977 | Mestaruussarja | 5 | 0 | – | | 5 | 0 |
| OTP Oulu | 1978 | Mestaruussarja | 4 | 0 | – | | 4 | 0 |
| OTP Oulu | Total | | 9 | 0 | 0 | 0 | 9 | 0 |
| Career total | | | 169 | 55 | 7 | 1 | 176 | 56 |

=== International ===
Appearances and goals by national team and year
| National team | Year | Apps | Goals |
|---|---|---|---|
Finland
| Finland | 1970 | 1 | 0 |
| Finland | 1971 | 1 | 0 |
| Finland | 1972 | 0 | 0 |
| Finland | 1973 | 1 | 0 |
| Finland | 1974 | 4 | 2 |
| Total | | 7 | 2 |

Scores and results list Finland's goal tally first, score column indicates score after each Rahja goal.

List of international goals scored by Timo Rahja
| No. | Date | Venue | Opponent | Score | Result | Competition |
|---|---|---|---|---|---|---|
| 1. | 1 September 1974 | Helsinki Olympic Stadium, Helsinki, Finland | Poland | 1–0 | 1–2 | UEFA Euro 1976 qualifying |
| 2. | 25 September 1974 | Helsinki Olympic Stadium, Helsinki, Finland | Netherlands | 1–0 | 1–3 | UEFA Euro 1976 qualifying |

== Honours ==
HJK

- Mestaruussarja: 1973
