= Esa Pekonen =

Finnish footballer and manager

Personal information
- Date of birth: 4 November 1961 (age 64)
- Place of birth: Lahti, Finland
- Height: 1.82 m (6 ft 0 in)
- Position: Defender

Senior career*
Years	Team	Apps	(Gls)
1978–1986	Kuusysi	191	(16)
1987–1989	AIK	48	(4)
1990	Kuusysi	25	(3)
1992–1993	MyPa	56	(3)
1994–1995	Kuusysi	35	(1)
1997–1999	Lahti	3	(0)

International career
1981–1989	Finland	60	(2)

Managerial career
- 1998–1999: Lahti
- 2000–2001: KuPS
- 2009–2014: KuPS
- * Club domestic league appearances and goals

Esa Pekonen (born 4 November 1961) is a Finnish former footballer and manager.

== Career statistics ==
=== Club ===
Appearances and goals by club, season and competition
Club	Season	League			Europe		Total	
Club	Season	Division	Apps	Goals	Apps	Goals	Apps	Goals
Kuusysi	1978	Ykkönen	4	2	–		4	2
Kuusysi	1979	Ykkönen	22	1	–		22	1
Kuusysi	1980	Ykkönen	28	4	–		28	4
Kuusysi	1981	Ykkönen	9	3	–		9	3
Kuusysi	1982	Mestaruussarja	29	2	2 (Note: Appearances in UEFA Cup Winners' Cup)	0	31	2
Kuusysi	1983	Mestaruussarja	28	0	2 (Note: Appearances in European Cup)	0	30	0
Kuusysi	1984	Mestaruussarja	26	2	2	0	28	2
Kuusysi	1985	Mestaruussarja	23	0	6	0	29	0
Kuusysi	1986	Mestaruussarja	22	2	–		22	2
Kuusysi	Total		191	16	12	0	203	16
AIK	1987	Allsvenskan	12	0	1 (Note: Appearance(s) in UEFA Intertoto Cup)	0	13	0
AIK	1988	Allsvenskan	19	2	–		19	2
AIK	1989	Allsvenskan	17	2	–		17	2
AIK	Total		48	4	1	0	49	4
Kuusysi	1990	Veikkausliiga	25	3	2	0	27	3
Kuusankosken Kumu	1991	Ykkönen			–			
MYPA	1992	Veikkausliiga	29	2	–		29	2
MYPA	1993	Veikkausliiga	27	1	2	0	29	1
MYPA	Total		56	3	2	0	58	3
Kuusysi	1994	Veikkausliiga	25	1	–		25	1
Kuusysi	1995	Veikkausliiga	10	0	–		10	0
Kuusysi	Total		35	1	0	0	35	1
Lahti	1997	Ykkönen			–			
Lahti	1998	Ykkönen			–			
Lahti	1999	Veikkausliiga	3	0	–		3	0
Lahti	Total		3	0	0	0	3	0
Career total			358	27	17	0	375	28

=== International ===
Appearances and goals by national team and year
National team	Year	Apps	Goals
Finland	1981	5	0
Finland	1982	9	0
Finland	1983	5	0
Finland	1984	12	1
Finland	1985	7	1
Finland	1986	8	0
Finland	1987	3	0
Finland	1988	9	0
Finland	1989	2	0
Total		60	2

Scores and results list Finland's goal tally first, score column indicates score after each Pekonen goal.

List of international goals scored by Esa Pekonen
No.	Date	Venue	Opponent	Score	Result	Competition
1.	22 November 1984	Khalifa International Stadium, Doha, Qatar	Qatar	2–0		Friendly
2.	26 February 1985	Unidad Deportiva Acapulco, Acapulco, Mexico	Mexico	1–1	1–2	Friendly

== Honours ==
Kuusysi

- Mestaruussarja (3): 1982, 1984, 1986
- Finnish Cup: 1983

MYPA

- Finnish Cup: 1992

Individual

- Finnish Football Journalists Player of the Year: 1986
- Veikkausliiga Manager of the Month: May 2010

== External links and references ==
- Esa Pekonen at National-Football-Teams.com
- Finland – International Player Records
