= Keijo Kousa =

Finnish footballer (born 1959)

Personal information
- Date of birth: 27 July 1959 (age 67)
- Place of birth: Myrskylä, Finland
- Height: 1.79 m (5 ft 10 in)
- Positions: Striker; defender

Youth career
- Myrskylän Myrsky
- Kuusysi

Senior career*
Years	Team	Apps	(Gls)
1978–1993	Kuusysi	343	(118)
1993–1998	LTP	58	(4)

International career
	Finland U21	6	(0)
1981–1986	Finland	18	(4)
- * Club domestic league appearances and goals as of 18 May 2024

Keijo Kousa (born 27 July 1959) is a Finnish former professional footballer who played as a striker and defender.

Kousa was capped 18 times for Finland national team in 1981–1986, scoring four goals. In the Finnish top-tiers Mestaruussarja and Veikkausliiga, Kousa played a total of 251 matches and scored 55 goals for FC Kuusysi, winning five Finnish Championship titles and two Finnish Cups.

His son Mikko Kousa is a Finnish ice hockey player.

== Career statistics ==
=== International ===
As of match played 22 January 1986

Finland
Year	Apps	Goals
1981	7	2
1982	5	2
1983	2	0
1984	3	0
1985	0	0
1986	1	0
Total	18	4

=== International goals ===
As of match played 8 September 1982. Finland score listed first, score column indicates score after each Kousa goal.

List of international goals scored by Keijo Kousa
No.	Date	Venue	Opponent	Score	Result	Competition
1	2 July 1981	Helsinki Olympic Stadium, Helsinki, Finland	Norway	1–0	3–1	Friendly
2	2 September 1981	Arto Tolsa Areena, Kotka, Finland	Albania	2–1	2–1	1982 FIFA World Cup qualification
3	11 July 1982	Helsinki Olympic Stadium, Helsinki, Finland	Iceland	3–2	3–2	Friendly
4	8 September 1982	Väinölänniemen stadion, Kuopio, Finland	Poland	2–3	2–3	UEFA Euro 1984 qualifying

== Honours ==
Kuusysi

- Mestaruussarja: 1982, 1984, 1986, 1989
- Veikkausliiga: 1991
- Finnish Cup: 1983, 1987
