= Jarmo Saastamoinen =

Finnish footballer (born 1967)

Personal information
- Date of birth: 20 September 1967 (age 59)
- Place of birth: Helsingin maalaiskunta, Finland
- Position: Defender

Youth career
- 1978–1984: TiPS

Senior career*
| Years | Team | Apps | (Gls) |
| 1987–1988 | Reipas | 69 | (4) |
| 1989–1994 | Kuusysi | 124 | (8) |
| 1995 | AIK | 8 | (0) |
| 1996 | FF Jaro | 27 | (1) |
| 1997–2000 | HJK | 95 | (2) |
| 2001 | Haka | 15 | (1) |

International career
| 1989–2001 | Finland | 21 | (0) |
- * Club domestic league appearances and goals

Jarmo Saastamoinen (born 20 September 1967) is a Finnish former football player.

In the 1998–99 season, he was part of the HJK Helsinki squad that reached the group phase of the UEFA Champions League, as the first and only Finnish club to this day.

== Career statistics ==
=== Club ===
Appearances and goals by club, season and competition
| Club | Season | Division | League | | Europe | | Total | |
| Club | Season | Division | Apps | Goals | Apps | Goals | Apps | Goals |
|---|---|---|---|---|---|---|---|---|
| Reipas Lahti | 1986 | Ykkönen | 22 | 1 | – | | 22 | 1 |
| Reipas Lahti | 1987 | Mestaruussarja | 22 | 1 | – | | 22 | 1 |
| Reipas Lahti | 1988 | Mestaruussarja | 27 | 2 | – | | 27 | 2 |
| Reipas Lahti | Total | | 69 | 4 | 0 | 0 | 69 | 4 |
| Kuusysi | 1989 | Mestaruussarja | 25 | 3 | 2 (Note: Appearances in UEFA Cup) | 0 | 27 | 3 |
| Kuusysi | 1990 | Veikkausliiga | 14 | 1 | 2 (Note: Appearances in European Cup) | 0 | 16 | 1 |
| Kuusysi | 1991 | Veikkausliiga | 33 | 3 | 2 | 0 | 35 | 3 |
| Kuusysi | 1992 | Veikkausliiga | 20 | 2 | 2 (Note: Appearances in UEFA Champions League) | 0 | 22 | 2 |
| Kuusysi | 1993 | Veikkausliiga | 21 | 0 | 4 | 0 | 25 | 0 |
| Kuusysi | 1994 | Veikkausliiga | 11 | 0 | – | | 11 | 0 |
| Kuusysi | Total | | 124 | 9 | 12 | 0 | 136 | 9 |
| AIK | 1995 | Allsvenskan | 8 | 0 | – | | 8 | 0 |
| Jaro | 1996 | Veikkausliiga | 27 | 1 | 4 (Note: Appearances in UEFA Intertoto Cup) | 0 | 31 | 1 |
| HJK Helsinki | 1997 | Veikkausliiga | 26 | 1 | 2 (Note: Appearances in UEFA Cup Winners' Cup) | 0 | 28 | 1 |
| HJK Helsinki | 1998 | Veikkausliiga | 26 | 0 | 9 | 0 | 35 | 0 |
| HJK Helsinki | 1999 | Veikkausliiga | 26 | 1 | 4 | 0 | 30 | 1 |
| HJK Helsinki | 2000 | Veikkausliiga | 17 | 0 | 2 | 0 | 19 | 0 |
| HJK Helsinki | Total | | 95 | 2 | 17 | 0 | 112 | 2 |
| Haka | 2001 | Veikkausliiga | 14 | 1 | 2 | 0 | 16 | 1 |
| Career total | | | 337 | 17 | 35 | 0 | 372 | 17 |

=== International ===
Appearances and goals by national team and year
| National team | Year | Apps | Goals |
|---|---|---|---|
| Finland | 1989 | 2 | 0 |
| Finland | 1990 | 4 | 0 |
| Finland | 1991 | 0 | 0 |
| Finland | 1992 | 0 | 0 |
| Finland | 1993 | 0 | 0 |
| Finland | 1994 | 0 | 0 |
| Finland | 1995 | 0 | 0 |
| Finland | 1996 | 0 | 0 |
| Finland | 1997 | 0 | 0 |
| Finland | 1998 | 1 | 0 |
| Finland | 1999 | 6 | 0 |
| Finland | 2000 | 5 | 0 |
| Finland | 2001 | 3 | 0 |
| Total | | 21 | 0 |

== Career honours ==
Winner:

- Mestaruussarja: (1) 1989
- Veikkausliiga: (2) 1991, 1997
- Finnish Cup: (2) 1998, 2000

Runner-up:

- Veikkausliiga: 1990, 1992, 1999
