= Vilppunen =

Vilppunen is a surname. Notable people with the surname include:

- Ossi Vilppunen (born 1936), Finnish footballer
- Pirkko Vilppunen (1934–2017), Finnish gymnast
