= Markku Lahti =

Finnish footballer (born 1945)

Personal information
- Date of birth: 18 April 1945 (age 81)
- Position: Half back

Senior career*
Years	Team	Apps	(Gls)
1963–1968	Valkeakosken Haka	92	(13)
1969	PS-44		

International career
1964–1965	Finland	2	(0)
- * Club domestic league appearances and goals

Markku Lahti (born 18 April 1945) is a Finnish footballer. He played in two matches for the Finland national football team from 1964 to 1965. He played for FC Haka in Mestaruussarja.

== Honours ==
=== As a player ===
Valkeakosken Haka

- Mestaruussarja: 1965
- Suomen Cup: 1963
