= Petri Järvinen =

Finnish footballer and manager (born 1965)

Personal information
- Date of birth: 9 May 1965 (age 61)
- Place of birth: Helsinki, Finland
- Position: Midfielder

Team information
- Current team: FC Lahti Akatemia (manager)

Senior career*
| Years | Team | Apps | (Gls) |
| 1982–1984 | JyP-77 | – | (16) |
| 1985 | Ilves | 3 | (0) |
| 1986 | Porin Pallo-Toverit | 22 | (8) |
| 1987–1988 | Haka | 42 | (10) |
| 1989–1992 | Kuusysi | 108 | (22) |
| 1992–1993 | St. Paul | 21 | (2) |
| 1993 | Kuusysi | 20 | (4) |
| 1994 | FinnPa | 9 | (3) |
| 1994–1995 | Waldhof Mannheim | 20 | (3) |
| 1995–1998 | FinnPa | 82 | (9) |
| 1999 | Lahti | 14 | (1) |
| 2000 | Honka | 25 | (3) |

International career
| 1989–1996 | Finland | 36 | (4) |

Managerial career
- 2010–: City Stars
- 2011–2012: Kuusysi
- 2013–: Lahti Akatemia
- * Club domestic league appearances and goals

Petri Järvinen (born 9 May 1965) is a Finnish football manager and former player who coaches FC Lahti Akatemia in the Finnish third tier Kakkonen.

On his professional career Järvinen played for several Finnish clubs and for FC St. Pauli and Waldhof Mannheim in the 2. Bundesliga. He was capped 36 times for the Finland national team, scoring four goals.

Later he became a coach and coached in Lahti for local clubs City Stars, Kuusysi and Reipas Lahti.

== Career statistics ==
Appearances and goals by national team and year
| National team | Year | Apps | Goals |
|---|---|---|---|
Finland
| Finland | 1989 | 1 | 0 |
| Finland | 1990 | 3 | 1 |
| Finland | 1991 | 5 | 1 |
| Finland | 1992 | 7 | 1 |
| Finland | 1993 | 1 | 0 |
| Finland | 1994 | 8 | 1 |
| Finland | 1995 | 5 | 0 |
| Finland | 1996 | 6 | 0 |
| Total | | 36 | 4 |

Scores and results list Finland's goal tally first, score column indicates score after each Järvinen goal.

List of international goals scored by Petri Järvinen
| No. | Date | Venue | Opponent | Score | Result | Competition |
|---|---|---|---|---|---|---|
| 1. | 29 August 1990 | Kuusankosken urheilupuisto, Kuusankoski, Finland | Czechoslovakia | 1–0 | 1–1 | Friendly |
| 2. | 16 May 1991 | Helsinki Olympic Stadium, Helsinki, Finland | Malta | 1–0 | 2–0 | UEFA Euro 1992 qualifying |
| 3. | 14 November 1992 | Parc des Princes, Paris, France | France | 1–2 | 1–2 | 1994 FIFA World Cup qualification |
| 4. | 2 June 1994 | Tampere Stadium, Tampere, Finland | Spain | 1–2 | 1–2 | Friendly |

== Honours ==
- Finnish Championship: 1989, 1991
