= City Stars =

City Stars may refer to:

- Cleveland City Stars, a former association football club in Ohio
- FC City Stars, an association football club in Lahti, Finland
- Nairobi City Stars, an association football club in Kenya
- Oxford City Stars, an ice hockey team in England
