= Tuomela =

Tuomela is a Finnish surname. Notable people with the surname include:

- Jessica Tuomela (born 1983), Canadian Paralympic swimmer
- Marko Tuomela (born 1972), Finnish footballer
- Raimo Tuomela (1940–2020), Finnish philosopher
