= UEFA Euro 1976 qualifying Group 5 =

Football tournament qualification stage

Group 5 of the UEFA Euro 1976 qualifying tournament was one of the eight groups to decide which teams would qualify for the UEFA Euro 1976 finals tournament. Group 5 consisted of four teams: Netherlands, Poland, Italy, and Finland, where they played against each other home-and-away in a round-robin format. The group winners were the Netherlands, who finished tied on points with Poland, but the Netherlands advanced with a better goal difference. Italy finished in third place despite conceding only 3 goals (all in the game lost in the Netherlands) as a consequence of the abysmal 3 goals scored in the 6 games.

== Final table ==
| Pos | Team | Pld | W | D | L | GF | GA | GD | Pts | Qualification | (Netherlands) | (Poland) | (Italy) | (Finland) |
|---|---|---|---|---|---|---|---|---|---|---|---|---|---|---|
| 1 | Netherlands | 6 | 4 | 0 | 2 | 14 | 8 | +6 | 8 | Advance to quarter-finals | — | 3–0 | 3–1 | 4–1 |
| 2 | Poland | 6 | 3 | 2 | 1 | 9 | 5 | +4 | 8 | | 4–1 | — | 0–0 | 3–0 |
| 3 | Italy | 6 | 2 | 3 | 1 | 3 | 3 | 0 | 7 | | 1–0 | 0–0 | — | 0–0 |
| 4 | Finland | 6 | 0 | 1 | 5 | 3 | 13 | −10 | 1 | | 1–3 | 1–2 | 0–1 | — |

Source: UEFA
Rules for classification: Qualification tiebreakers

== Matches ==
1 September 1974
15:00

| Finland | 1–2 | Poland |
|---|---|---|
| Rahja 3' | | Szarmach 23'; Lato 50' |

Olympiastadion, Helsinki
Attendance: 18,759
Referee: John Wright Paterson (Scotland)

25 September 1974
18:30

| Finland | 1–3 | Netherlands |
|---|---|---|
| Rahja 16' | | Cruyff 28', 40'; Neeskens 51' (pen.) |

Olympiastadion, Helsinki
Attendance: 20,449
Referee: Wolfgang Riedel
(East Germany)

9 October 1974
14:30

| Poland | 3–0 | Finland |
|---|---|---|
| Kasperczak 12'; Gadocha 14'; Lato 53' |

Stadion Warty, Poznań
Attendance: 38,724
Referee: Dušan Maksimović (Yugoslavia)

20 November 1974
20:30

| Netherlands | 3–1 | Italy |
|---|---|---|
| Rensenbrink 24'; Cruyff 64', 80' | | Boninsegna 5' |

Stadion Feyenoord (De Kuip), Rotterdam
Attendance: 58,463
Referee: Pavel Kazakov (USSR)

19 April 1975
15:30

| Italy | 0–0 | Poland |

Stadio Olimpico, Rome
Attendance: 66,048
Referee: Robert Héliès (France)

5 June 1975
19:00

| Finland | 0–1 | Italy |
|---|---|---|
| | | Chinaglia 26' (pen.) |

Olympiastadion, Helsinki
Attendance: 17,732
Referee: Walter Eschweiler (West Germany)

3 September 1975
20:00

| Netherlands | 4–1 | Finland |
|---|---|---|
| Van der Kuijlen 29', 35', 55'; Lubse 48' | | Paatelainen 9' |

Stadion de Goffert, Nijmegen
Attendance: 19,189 *
Referee: Eric Smyton (Northern Ireland)

(*)NOTE: Attendance also reported as 28,000

10 September 1975
17:30

| Poland | 4–1 | Netherlands |
|---|---|---|
| Lato 14'; Gadocha 44'; Szarmach 63', 77' | | Van de Kerkhof 80' |

Stadion Śląski, Chorzów
Attendance: 70,409
Referee: Patrick Partridge (England)

27 September 1975
16:30

| Italy | 0–0 | Finland |

Stadio Olimpico, Rome
Attendance: 29,203
Referee: Costas Xanthoulis (Cyprus)

15 October 1975
20:15

| Netherlands | 3–0 | Poland |
|---|---|---|
| Neeskens 16'; Geels 47'; Thijssen 59' |

Olympisch Stadion, Amsterdam
Attendance: 56,030
Referee: Károly Palotai (Hungary)

26 October 1975
14:00

| Poland | 0–0 | Italy |

Stadion Dziesięciolecia, Warsaw
Attendance: 59,773
Referee: Paul Schiller (Austria)

22 November 1975
14:30

| Italy | 1–0 | Netherlands |
|---|---|---|
| Capello 20' |

Stadio Olimpico, Rome
Attendance: 33,307
Referee: Robert Schaut (Belgium)

== Goalscorers ==
There were 29 goals scored in 12 matches, for an average of 2.42 goals per match.

4 goals

- (Netherlands national football team) Johan Cruyff

3 goals

- (Netherlands national football team) Willy van der Kuijlen
- (Poland national football team) Grzegorz Lato
- (Poland national football team) Andrzej Szarmach

2 goals

- (Finland national football team) Timo Rahja
- (Netherlands national football team) Johan Neeskens
- (Poland national football team) Robert Gadocha

1 goal

- (Finland national football team) Matti Paatelainen
- (Italy national football team) Roberto Boninsegna
- (Italy national football team) Fabio Capello
- (Italy national football team) Giorgio Chinaglia
- (Netherlands national football team) Ruud Geels
- (Netherlands national football team) Harry Lubse
- (Netherlands national football team) Rob Rensenbrink
- (Netherlands national football team) Frans Thijssen
- (Netherlands national football team) René van de Kerkhof
- (Poland national football team) Henryk Kasperczak
