= Markku Kumpulampi =

Finnish footballer (born 1939)

Personal information
- Date of birth: 21 May 1939 (age 87)
- Position: Winger

Senior career*
Years	Team	Apps	(Gls)
1956–1963	Valkeakosken Haka	145	(55)
1964–1968	Upon Pallo		
1969–1970	Lahden Reipas	18	(4)

International career
1957–1966	Finland	16	(1)
- * Club domestic league appearances and goals

Markku Kumpulampi (born 21 May 1939) is a Finnish former footballer. He played in 16 matches for the Finland national football team from 1957 to 1966. He played for Valkeakosken Haka, Upon Pallo and Lahden Reipas. In his 13 seasons he played 217 games and scored 83 goals in Mestaruussarja. He also played two seasons in Suomensarja where he scored 18 goals.
