= Marko Tuomela =

Finnish footballer (born 1972)

Personal information
- Date of birth: 3 March 1972 (age 54)
- Place of birth: Stockholm, Sweden
- Height: 1.94 m (6 ft 4 in)
- Position: Defender

Senior career*
Years	Team	Apps	(Gls)
1992	Kuusankosken Kumu	15	(2)
1993–1994	Kuusysi	41	(5)
1995–1996	TPV	48	(4)
1997	Jaro	25	(2)
1997	Motherwell	0	(0)
1998–2000	Tromsø	35	(1)
2000	Swindon Town	2	(0)
2001–2002	GIF Sundsvall	38	(2)
2003	Liaoning Zhongshun	4	(0)
2003	IFK Sundsvall	18	(1)

International career
1995–2003	Finland	24	(1)
- * Club domestic league appearances and goals

Marko Tuomela (born 3 March 1972) is a Finnish former footballer. He is a former international defender who has played for clubs all over the world including Kuusysi Lahti, TPV Tampere, FF Jaro, Tromsø IL, Motherwell (loan), Swindon Town (loan), GIF Sundsvall, Liaoning F.C. and IFK Sundsvall.

== Career statistics ==
=== Club ===
As of 18 May 2024

Appearances and goals by club, season and competition
Club	Season	League			Europe		Total	
Club	Season	Division	Apps	Goals	Apps	Goals	Apps	Goals
Kuusankosken Kumu	1992	Ykkönen	15	2	–		15	2
Kuusysi	1992	Veikkausliiga	22	1	4 (Note: Includes UEFA Cup)	0	26	1
Kuusysi	1994	Veikkausliiga	19	4	–		19	4
Kuusysi	Total		41	5	0	0	45	5
TPV	1995	Veikkausliiga	23	2	1	0	24	2
TPV	1996	Ykkönen	25	2	–		25	2
TPV	Total		48	4	1	0	49	4
Jaro	1997	Veikkausliiga	25	2	–		25	2
Motherwell	1997–98	Scottish Premier Division	0	0	–		0	0
Tromsø	1998	Tippeligaen	26	1	–		26	1
Tromsø	1999	Tippeligaen	4	0	–		4	0
Tromsø	2000	Tippeligaen	5	0	–		5	0
Tromsø	Total		35	1	–	–	35	1
Swindon Town	2000–01	Second Division	2	0	–		2	0
GIF Sundsvall	2001	Allsvenskan	15	0	–		15	0
GIF Sundsvall	2002	Allsvenskan	23	2	–		23	2
GIF Sundsvall	Total		48	2	–	–	48	2
Liaoning Zhongshun	2003	Chinese Jia-A League	4	0	–		4	0
IFK Sundsvall	2003	Division 3	18	1	–		18	1
Career total			236	17	5	0	241	17

=== International ===
As of match played 29 January 2003

Appearances and goals by national team and year
National team	Year	Apps	Goals
Finland	1995	2	0
Finland	1996	0	0
Finland	1997	4	0
Finland	1998	7	0
Finland	1999	3	0
Finland	2000	4	1
Finland	2001	3	0
Finland	2002	0	0
Finland	2003	1	0
Total		24	1

As of goal scored on 10 October 2019
Scores and results list Finland's goal tally first, score column indicates score after each Finland goal.

List of international goals scored by Marko Tuomela
No.	Date	Venue	Opponent	Score	Result	Competition	Ref.
1	23 February 2000	Rajamangala Stadium, Bangkok, Thailand	Estonia	2–0	4–2	Friendly	
