= Kurt Weinreich =

German football manager

Personal information
- Date of birth: 12 December 1908
- Place of birth: Saarbruecken, Germany
- Date of death: 8 April 1998 (aged 89)
- Place of death: Koblenz Germany

Managerial career
- Years: Team
- 1955–1958: Finland

Kurt Weinreich (12 December 1908 – 8 April 1998) was a German football manager. He was the head coach of the Finland national football team from August 1955 to October 1958.

Weinreich was a former centre forward. He was signed by the Football Association of Finland in 1955. In May 1957 Weinreich made a new two-year contract, which allowed him to coach the third-tier club LPM Lahti as well. Weinreich was very popular among the players but had some conflicts with the Football Association. In October 1958 his contract was no longer renewed.
