= Ilkka Remes (footballer) =

Finnish footballer (born 1963)

Personal information
- Date of birth: 29 July 1963 (age 63)
- Place of birth: Lahti, Finland
- Height: 1.78 m (5 ft 10 in)
- Position: Defender

Senior career*
Years	Team	Apps	(Gls)
1981–1993	Kuusysi	328	(22)

International career
1982–1992	Finland		
- * Club domestic league appearances and goals

Ilkka Remes (born 29 July 1963) is a retired Finnish football defender.
