= FC City Stars =

Finnish football club

City Stars
- Full name: City Stars
- Founded: 1982; 44 years ago
- Ground: Kisapuiston kenttä, Lahti; Finland
- Capacity: 4,000
- Manager: Petri Järvinen
- Coach: Petri Haapsaari (GK)
- League: Kakkonen
- 2009: 1st – Kolmonen (Helsinki and Uusimaa)
Home colours

City Stars was a football club from Lahti in Finland. The club was formed in 1982 and their home ground is at the Kisapuiston kenttä. The team last plays in the Kakkonen (Second Division). The Head coach was to this time Petri Järvinen.

== History ==
City Stars spent many seasons in the lower divisions of the Finnish football league following their formation in 1982. The year 2006 saw a huge change in fortunes when they won Section 2 of the Kolmonen (Helsinki and Uusimaa). The team then won the promotion play-off group to seal promotion.

In early 2007 City Stars became part of the Lahti club, FC Kuusysi, and established their own business unit within the organisation. At the same time City Stars received support from Petri Pasanen, the Finnish international, and Kari Kangasaho, the Kuusysi coach. In 2007–2008 seasons the club also formed a cooperative link with FC Lahti.

City Stars played two seasons in the Kakkonen (Second Division), the third tier of Finnish football from 2007 to 2008 before relegation back to the Kolmonen (Third Division). Their stay at the lower level was short-lived as another promotion in 2009 saw them back in the Kakkonen for 2010 after narrowly beating local rivals Salpausselän Reipas by 2 points.

City Stars are known to be a good cup team, especially in the Finnish Cup (Suomen Cup). In the 2009 competition they pushed their way through to quarter finals before losing 0–3 to FC Honka, ending their run.

City Stars are proud to take part in the Uusi Lahti Cup tournament. In 2007 they beat Estonian Meistriliiga (First Division) club FC Levadia Tallinn and were ranked in positions 5–6. In 2008, the team reached a similar position by winning a penalty shoot-out against JJK Jyväskylä from the (First Division). In 2010 the team lost 3–0 to HJK Helsinki in the quarter-finals but beat PoPa Pori 2–1 in the ranking match.

FC Kuusysi

== Season to season ==
Season	Level	Division	Section	Administration	Position	Movements
2000	Tier 5	Nelonen (Fourth Division)	Section 2	Uusimaa (SPL Uusimaa)	1st	Promoted
2001	Tier 4	Kolmonen (Third Division)	Section 3	Helsinki & Uusimaa (SPL Helsinki)		
2002	Tier 4	Kolmonen (Third Division)	Section 3	Helsinki & Uusimaa (SPL Helsinki)	3rd	
2003	Tier 4	Kolmonen (Third Division)	Section 2	Helsinki & Uusimaa (SPL Uusimaa)	3rd	
2004	Tier 4	Kolmonen (Third Division)	Section 2	Helsinki & Uusimaa (SPL Uusimaa)	2nd	
2005	Tier 4	Kolmonen (Third Division)	Section 2	Helsinki & Uusimaa (SPL Uusimaa)	1st	Play-offs
2006	Tier 4	Kolmonen (Third Division)	Section 2	Helsinki & Uusimaa (SPL Uusimaa)	1st	Promoted
2007	Tier 3	Kakkonen (Second Division)	Group A	Finnish FA (Suomen Pallolitto)	5th	
2008	Tier 3	Kakkonen (Second Division)	Group A	Finnish FA (Suomen Pallolitto)	12th	Relegated
2009	Tier 4	Kolmonen (Third Division)	Section 3	Helsinki & Uusimaa (SPL Uusimaa)	1st	Promoted
2010	Tier 3	Kakkonen (Second Division)	Group A	Finnish FA (Suomen Pallolitto)		

- 3 seasons in Kakkonen
- 7 seasons in Kolmonen
- 1 season in Nelonen

== Club structure ==
City Stars is part of the FC Kuusysi structure which has 1 men's team, 1 veteran's team, 1 ladies team, 1 disability team, 15 boys teams and 9 girls teams.

== 2010 season ==
City Stars are competing in Group A (Lohko A) of the Kakkonen administered by the Football Association of Finland (Suomen Palloliitto) . This is the third highest tier in the Finnish football system. In 2009 City Stars finished in first position in their Kolmonen (Third Division) section and were promoted back to the Kakkonen..

== References and sources ==
- Official Website
- Finnish Wikipedia
- Suomen Cup
- FC City Stars / FC Kuusysi Fans Facebook
