= Lars Näsman =

Finnish footballer (1943-1995)

Personal information
- Date of birth: 14 July 1943
- Date of death: 10 October 1995 (aged 52)
- Place of death: Cyprus
- Height: 1.78 m (5 ft 10 in)
- Position: Goalkeeper

Senior career*
Years	Team	Apps	(Gls)
1961–1964	Vasa IFK		
1965–1967	Upon Pallo		
1968	Vasa IFK		
1969–1971	SC Cambuur		
1971–1972	Helsingfors IFK	20	(0)
1973–1976	Ekenäs IF		

International career
1964–1971	Finland	34	(0)
- * Club domestic league appearances and goals

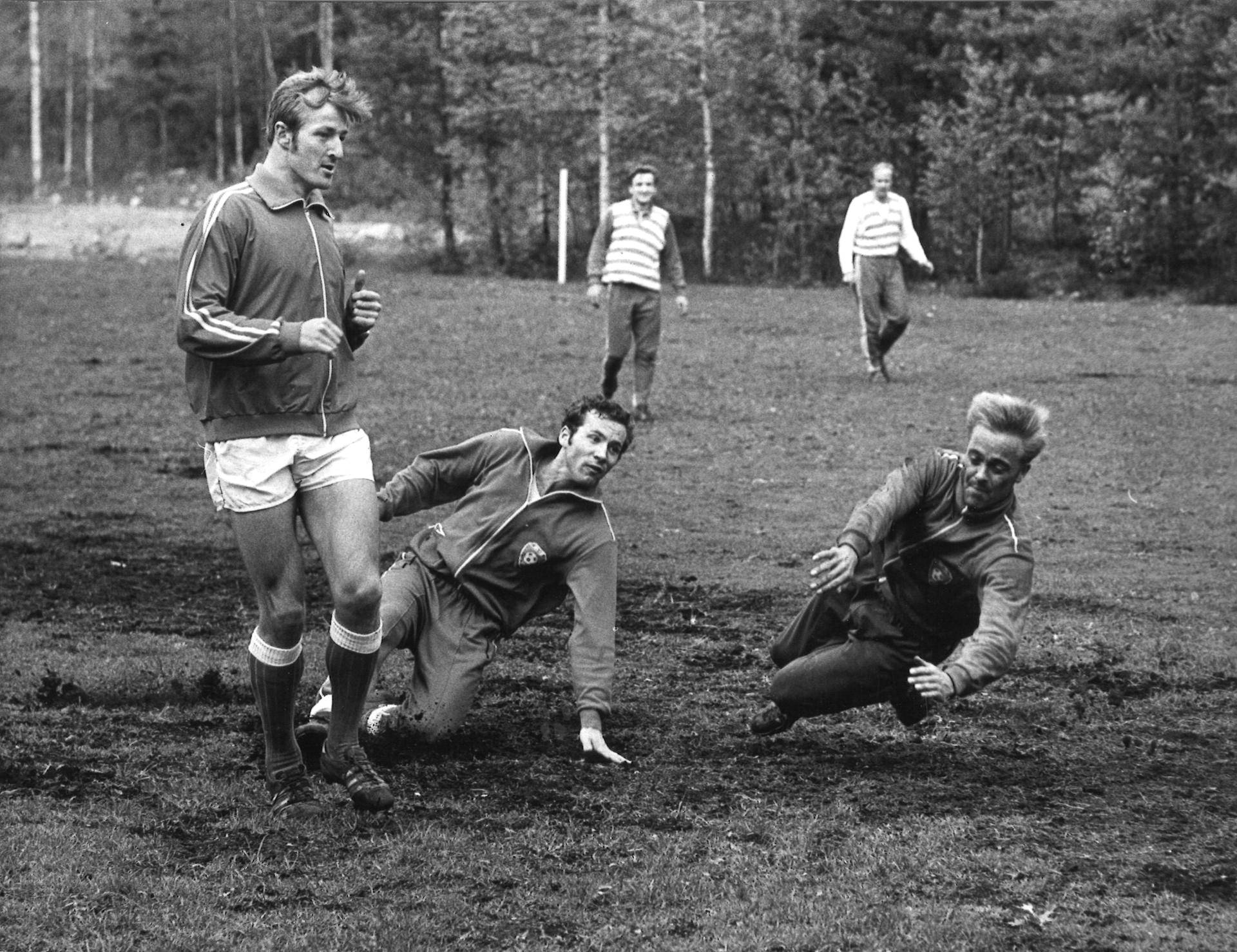
Lars Näsman (right) in game practice with Arto Tolsa (left) and Tommy Lindholm, summer 1970.

Lars Näsman (14 July 1943 – 10 October 1995) is considered one of the best Finnish football goalkeepers of all time, having been capped for 37 full international matches.

He was voted the Player of the year in Finland in 1965 and 1967. He was also ranked 10th in the annual List of top sportsmen in Finland in 1967.

== Career ==
Näsman was born in the coastal town of Vaasa in 1943. He started his playing career with VIFK from where he moved to Upon Pallo, Lahti. He joined the Dutch team Cambuur in 1969, remaining there for three years.

In 1971, he joined HIFK, who were runners up in the Finnish league in the same year.

He ended his playing career after 1976 season at Ekenäs IF.

Lars Näsman was not tall for a goalkeeper, only 178 cm. However, his fast reactions, good eye for the ball and speed made him the perfect choice for the Finland national team.

=== Bandy ===
Näsman was also the national goalkeeper for Finland in the sport of bandy, in which he was elected the Best goalkeeper in the world in 1967.

== Coach ==
After his playing career, Näsman coached EIF a second division team in southern Finland.

Lars Näsman had strong opinions about how football should be developed in Finland and in 1970 he told YLE Television, "We must get rid of secret payments to players. Players must be paid openly for their work. Finland can never rise to international level if we don't give up semi-professionalism where players go to work and train in their spare time".
