= Juha Annunen =

Finnish footballer (born 1960)

Personal information
- Date of birth: 16 April 1960 (age 66)
- Place of birth: Oulu
- Position: Midfielder

Senior career*
Years	Team	Apps	(Gls)
1977–1981	OTP Oulu		
1982–1983	FC Kuusysi	56	(19)
1984–1985	OTP Oulu	26	(9)
1986–1995	FC Kuusysi	255	(54)
1996–1997	LTP Lahti		

International career
1980–1987	Finland	9	(0)
- * Club domestic league appearances and goals

Juha Annunen (born 16 April 1960) is a retired Finnish football midfielder. At club level he played for FC Kuusysi and Oulun Työväen Palloilijat.
