= Pertti Mäkipää =

Finnish footballer (1941–2019)

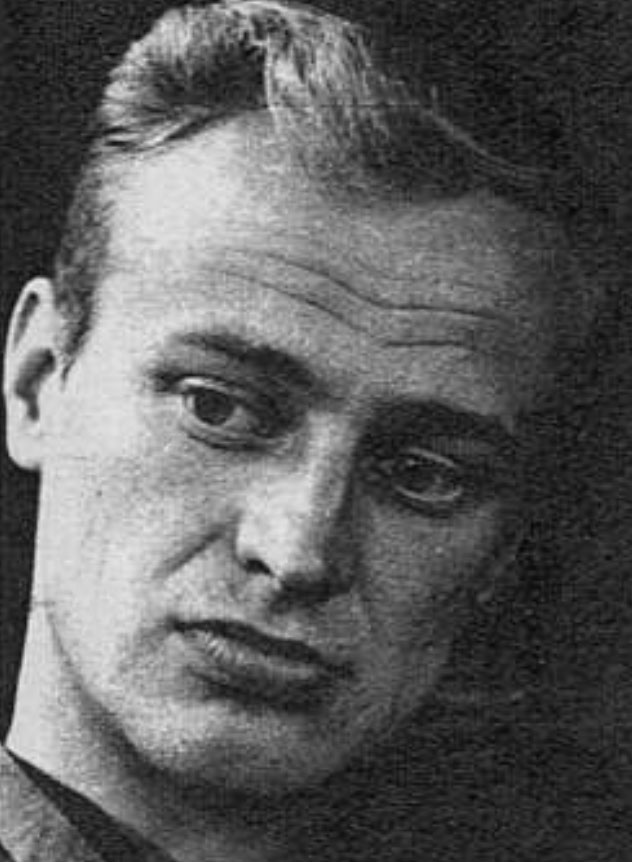
- Mäkipää in 1960s

Personal information
- Date of birth: 4 August 1941
- Place of birth: Tampere, Finland
- Date of death: 19 August 2019 (aged 78)
- Position: Midfielder

Senior career*
Years	Team	Apps	(Gls)
1960	Kipinä		
1961	Tampereen Pallo-Veikot		(7)
1962	Reipas	22	(0)
1963–1965	Tampereen Palloilijat		(9)
1966–1967	Upon Pallo		(3)
1968	Tampellan Pallo		
1969–1974	Tampellan Palloilijat		(24)
1975	Ilves		
1976	Tampereen Pallo-Veikot		

International career
1962–1970	Finland	46	(2)
- * Club domestic league appearances and goals

Pertti Mäkipää (4 August 1941 – 19 August 2019) was a Finnish footballer who played as a midfielder. He made 46 appearances for the Finland national team from 1962 to 1970. He played for a number of clubs in his native Finland, mostly in Tampere

== Honours ==
Ilves

- Finnish Cup: 1979
