= Kimmo Tarkkio =

Finnish footballer (born 1966)

Personal information
- Full name: Kimmo Juhani Tarkkio
- Date of birth: 15 January 1966 (age 60)
- Place of birth: Helsinki, Finland
- Height: 1.78 m (5 ft 10 in)
- Position: Striker

Senior career*
Years	Team	Apps	(Gls)
1982–1985	JJK	–	(–)
1986–1988	HJK	52	(8)
1989	Hammarby IF	25	(10)
1989–1990	Tiong Bahru	9	(9)
1990	HJK	27	(16)
1991	Haka	28	(23)
1991	Kuusysi	32	(15)
1992–1993	Chaves	22	(7)
1993	Kuusysi	7	(2)
1993–1994	Felgueiras	16	(4)
1994	Kuusysi	17	(6)
1995	FinnPa	12	(2)
1996	Haka	3	(1)
1996	Geylang United	–	(–)
1997	PK-35	12	(9)
1997–1999	VPS	52	(14)
1999	MP	9	(3)
2000	Guangzhou Apollo	–	(–)

International career
1986–1987	Finland U21	5	(1)
1986–1992	Finland	33	(3)
- * Club domestic league appearances and goals

Kimmo Juhani Tarkkio (born 15 January 1966) is a retired Finnish footballer who played as a striker. After retiring, he took up billiards.

== International career ==
Tarkkio made his debut with the Finnish national team on the 21 February 1986, in a 0–0 friendly draw with Bahrain. On 13 January 1989, Tarkkio scored his first goal for Finland in their 2–1 friendly loss to Egypt at the Cairo International Stadium in Cairo.

Tarkkio played his last game for the Huuhkajat on 14 November 1992, against France in a 1994 FIFA World Cup qualifier. Tarkkio finished his international career with 33 caps and scoring 3 goals.

=== International goals ===
#	Date	Venue	Opponent	Score	Result	Competition
1	13 January 1989	Cairo International Stadium, Cairo, Egypt	Egypt	1 – 1	2 – 1	Friendly
2	23 August 1989	Savon Sanomat Areena, Kuopio, Finland	Yugoslavia	1 – 0	2 – 2	Friendly
3	10 March 1990	Tampa Stadium, Tampa, United States	United States	1 – 1	2 – 1	Friendly
Correct as of 7 October 2015
