= Mike Belfield =

English footballer and manager (born 1961)

Personal information
- Full name: Michael Robert Belfield
- Date of birth: 10 June 1961 (age 65)
- Place of birth: Wandsworth, London, England
- Position: Striker

Senior career*
Years	Team	Apps	(Gls)
1979–1983	Wimbledon	24	(4)
1981–1982	→ Koparit	39	(20)
1983–1987	FC Ilves	118	(23)
1988–1990	Reipas Lahti	79	(29)
1991–1993	FC Kuusysi	77	(36)
1994–1995	FC Haka	29	(7)
1996–1998	PK-35	–	(39)
1998	TPV	3	(3)
1999	HIFK	12	(0)
2000–2005	HyPS	17	(6)
2004	Atlantis FC	7	(0)
2000–2005	HyPS	3	(0)
- * Club domestic league appearances and goals

Michael Robert Belfield (born 10 June 1961) is an English retired professional footballer and coach who works as a youth coach at Finnish club RiPS.

He played as a winger for Wimbledon in the Football League and had a long career in Finland. Belfield played 16 seasons and 355 caps in the Finnish premier divisions Mestaruussarja and Veikkausliiga for Koparit, FC Ilves, Reipas Lahti, FC Kuusysi, FC Haka and PK-35 from 1981 to 1995 and 1998. Whilst at Kuusysi he memorably scored the only goal as they beat Liverpool in a 1991–92 UEFA Cup tie, however despite winning 1–0 on the night Kuusysi lost 6–2 on aggregate. After his professional career Belfield has been coaching several Finnish clubs, including HIFK.

== Honours ==
- Finnish championship: 1983, 1991, 1995
