= Raimo Saviomaa =

Finnish footballer (born 1946)

Personal information
- Date of birth: 15 April 1946 (age 80)
- Position: Defender

International career
Years	Team	Apps	(Gls)
1968–1974	Finland	26	(0)

Raimo Saviomaa (born 15 April 1946) is a Finnish former footballer who played as a defender. He made 26 appearances for the Finland national team from 1968 to 1974.
