= Reijo Kanerva =

Finnish footballer (1944–2016)

Personal information
- Date of birth: 29 January 1944
- Date of death: 1 March 2016 (aged 72)

International career
Years	Team	Apps	(Gls)
1964–1967	Finland	15	(0)

Reijo Kanerva (29 January 1944 – 1 March 2016) was a Finnish footballer. He played in 15 matches for the Finland national football team from 1964 to 1967.
