= 1972 Mestaruussarja =

Mestaruussarja
- Season: 1972
- Champions: TPS Turku

Statistics of Mestaruussarja in the 1972 season.

== Overview ==
It was contested by 12 teams, and TPS Turku won the championship.

== League standings ==
Pos	Team	Pld	W	D	L	GF	GA	GD	Pts
1	TPS Turku (C)	22	15	1	6	44	19	+25	31
2	MP Mikkeli	22	11	8	3	42	22	+20	30
3	Reipas Lahti	22	12	4	6	48	30	+18	28
4	KuPS Kuopio	22	12	2	8	37	31	+6	26
5	KPV Kokkola	22	9	7	6	35	31	+4	25
6	Kuusysi Lahti	22	10	5	7	39	39	0	25
7	KPT Kuopio	22	8	5	9	32	36	−4	21
8	TaPa Tampere	22	8	5	9	27	33	−6	21
9	HJK Helsinki	22	10	1	11	24	32	−8	21
10	HIFK Helsinki (R)	22	7	3	12	39	44	−5	17
11	VPS Vaasa (R)	22	4	6	12	20	36	−16	14
12	Haka Valkeakoski (R)	22	2	1	19	17	51	−34	5

Source: rsssf.com
(C) Champions; (R) Relegated

== Results ==
Home \ Away	HAK	HFK	HJK	KPT	KPV	KPS	LAH	MP	REI	TPT	TPS	VPS
FC Haka		1–5	0–2	0–2	0–2	1–2	1–2	0–3	0–2	0–2	2–0	1–2
HIFK	2–0		1–2	5–2	2–3	1–2	2–4	1–6	1–5	4–1	0–1	0–0
HJK Helsinki	1–0	2–3		1–0	1–0	3–1	0–3	1–0	3–1	5–3	0–2	0–0
KPT	4–1	2–4	1–0		2–2	1–2	3–1	1–1	1–0	0–0	0–1	0–0
KPV	2–1	2–1	3–0	1–1		1–3	6–1	1–1	1–1	0–0	3–1	0–0
KuPS	2–1	2–0	2–0	1–0	2–2		2–4	1–2	2–3	2–1	2–0	1–3
Lahti-69	0–0	2–1	1–0	3–2	1–3	1–2		0–0	2–2	3–1	1–2	1–1
MP	3–2	1–1	4–1	2–3	4–0	0–0	4–2		0–0	1–1	0–4	3–1
Reipas	3–2	1–3	4–1	6–1	3–1	4–2	1–2	1–2		2–2	2–0	2–0
TaPa	1–0	2–1	1–0	1–2	2–1	1–0	1–3	0–0	3–1		1–2	3–1
TPS	7–0	1–1	2–0	3–1	4–0	2–0	3–0	0–2	1–3	2–0		5–1
VPS	2–4	2–0	0–1	1–3	0–1	0–4	2–2	1–3	0–1	3–0	0–1	

Legend: Blue = home team win; Yellow = draw; Red = away team win.

== Attendances ==
No.	Club	Average
1	TPS	3,611
2	Reipas	3,400
3	KuPS	3,206
4	MP	2,941
5	HJK	2,560
6	HIFK	2,394
7	KPV	2,261
8	KPT	2,238
9	Lahti-69	2,015
10	TaPa	1,723
11	VPS	1,480
12	Haka	1,002
