= 1971 Mestaruussarja =

Mestaruussarja
- Season: 1971
- Champions: TPS Turku
- Relegated: OTP Oulu, MiPK Mikkeli, Ilves-Kissat Tampere

Statistics of Mestaruussarja in the 1971 season.

== Overview ==
It was contested by 14 teams, and TPS Turku won the championship.

== League standings ==
Pos	Team	Pld	W	D	L	GF	GA	GD	Pts
1	TPS Turku (C)	26	13	8	5	53	25	+28	34
2	HIFK Helsinki	26	11	11	4	45	29	+16	33
3	KPV Kokkola	26	13	7	6	37	22	+15	33
4	HJK Helsinki	26	10	11	5	46	32	+14	31
5	MP Mikkeli	26	10	10	6	45	30	+15	30
6	Kuusysi Lahti	26	10	9	7	40	29	+11	29
7	KuPS Kuopio	26	11	5	10	45	34	+11	27
8	Haka Valkeakoski	26	11	4	11	42	50	−8	26
9	Reipas Lahti	26	9	5	12	42	40	+2	23
10	VPS Vaasa	26	9	5	12	22	39	−17	23
11	TPV Tampere (Q, R)	26	9	3	14	34	52	−18	21
12	OTP Oulu (R)	26	7	6	13	31	51	−20	20
13	MiPK Mikkeli (R)	26	5	8	13	27	52	−25	18
14	Ilves-Kissat Tampere (R)	26	5	6	15	28	52	−24	16

Source: rsssf.com
(C) Champions; (Q) Qualified for the phase indicated; (R) Relegated

== Results ==
Home \ Away	HAK	HFK	HJK	ILV	KPV	KPS	L69	MPK	MP	OTP	REI	TPS	TPV	VPS
FC Haka		0–2	1–1	1–3	2–1	2–1	0–2	5–2	1–4	1–1	3–2	0–5	5–2	3–0
HIFK	4–2		1–1	4–2	2–2	3–1	1–1	3–1	1–1	3–1	2–3	1–2	4–1	1–1
HJK Helsinki	1–1	2–2		1–1	0–1	2–2	1–1	7–0	1–1	1–0	2–4	1–0	6–1	3–0
I-Kissat	0–1	1–2	0–1		1–1	0–4	2–2	0–0	2–1	1–3	3–4	0–0	0–2	2–0
KPV	0–0	1–0	3–0	3–1		2–0	2–0	0–1	2–0	0–2	4–0	1–0	2–1	4–1
KuPS	2–0	1–1	1–2	2–1	2–0		1–1	3–0	2–3	3–1	2–1	0–2	6–0	0–0
Lahti-69	4–1	2–0	1–1	0–3	0–0	4–2		3–0	1–1	4–2	3–0	2–0	1–3	0–1
MiPK	0–1	1–1	3–1	5–0	1–2	2–2	2–0		1–1	0–0	0–6	0–0	0–1	0–1
MP	5–1	0–0	0–0	5–1	0–1	2–1	1–0	3–0		5–0	1–1	3–3	1–1	0–0
OTP	1–3	0–3	2–3	4–3	1–1	1–0	1–1	3–3	2–1		1–4	0–0	2–1	0–2
Reipas	1–0	1–1	1–2	0–1	1–1	1–3	0–1	3–0	0–2	4–0		0–0	0–2	1–1
TPS	5–1	0–0	1–1	4–0	3–1	2–0	0–3	2–2	5–2	3–0	1–3		5–2	5–0
TPV	1–4	0–1	1–3	2–0	1–1	0–2	1–1	3–0	3–1	1–0	2–1	1–3		0–1
VPS	0–3	1–2	2–1	0–0	2–1	1–2	2–1	1–3	0–1	0–3	2–0	1–2	2–1	

Legend: Blue = home team win; Yellow = draw; Red = away team win.

== Attendances ==
No.	Club	Average
1	Reipas	3,980
2	TPS	3,897
3	HIFK	3,653
4	HJK	3,188
5	Lahti-69	3,147
6	KPV	2,901
7	KuPS	2,804
8	MP	2,751
9	OTP	2,740
10	VPS	2,359
11	TPV	2,098
12	MiPK	2,025
13	IKissat	1,712
14	Haka	1,210
