= 1973 Mestaruussarja =

Mestaruussarja
- Season: 1973

The 1973 Mestaruussarja, the premier division of Finnish football, was contested by 12 teams, and HJK Helsinki won the championship.

== League standings ==
Pos	Team	Pld	W	D	L	GF	GA	GD	Pts
1	HJK Helsinki (C)	22	14	5	3	36	21	+15	33
2	KPV Kokkola	22	12	7	3	42	17	+25	31
3	Reipas Lahti	22	13	4	5	39	15	+24	30
4	KuPS Kuopio	22	10	6	6	34	22	+12	26
5	OTP Oulu	22	9	8	5	29	30	−1	26
6	KPT Kuopio	22	9	7	6	36	24	+12	25
7	MP Mikkeli	22	6	7	9	23	24	−1	19
8	Kuusysi Lahti	22	7	4	11	31	38	−7	18
9	TPS Turku	22	5	7	10	23	32	−9	17
10	IKissat Tampere	22	5	7	10	25	46	−21	17
11	Ponnistus Helsinki (R)	22	3	7	12	30	44	−14	13
12	TaPa (R)	22	2	5	15	20	55	−35	9

Source: rsssf.com
(C) Champions; (R) Relegated

== Results ==
Home \ Away	HJK	IKT	KPT	KPV	KPS	LAH	MP	OTP	PON	REI	TPT	TPS
HJK Helsinki		3–1	2–2	0–0	1–0	3–2	2–0	2–2	2–0	2–1	2–0	1–0
IKissat	0–2		1–2	3–2	0–4	0–3	1–0	1–1	1–1	0–2	1–1	3–3
KPT	3–0	0–2		0–0	2–2	3–0	0–0	5–0	0–0	0–2	1–1	1–0
KPV	1–1	3–0	2–0		2–1	1–0	2–0	5–1	2–0	3–2	3–1	0–0
KuPS	0–1	7–2	1–0	1–1		1–3	2–3	0–0	3–1	1–0	1–0	2–0
Lahti-69	4–3	2–3	1–4	1–3	1–2		0–1	0–2	0–0	2–2	3–2	1–1
MP	1–2	1–1	0–1	0–0	1–1	2–0		1–1	2–1	1–3	3–1	0–0
OTP	1–0	5–1	3–2	1–0	0–0	3–1	0–0		2–1	0–0	3–0	0–3
Ponnistus	0–2	1–1	2–5	3–3	1–2	2–2	1–4	2–3		1–1	4–2	4–0
Reipas	0–1	2–0	1–0	1–0	1–1	0–1	3–0	4–0	1–0		6–0	2–0
TaPa	2–2	1–3	3–3	0–5	2–1	0–3	1–5	2–1	0–2	0–1		1–1
TPS	1–2	0–0	1–2	1–4	2–1	0–1	1–0	0–0	6–3	2–4	1–0	

Legend: Blue = home team win; Yellow = draw; Red = away team win.

== Attendances ==
No.	Club	Average
1	HJK	3,781
2	OTP	3,687
3	Reipas	2,757
4	KPV	2,729
5	KPT	2,697
6	KuPS	2,608
7	TPS	2,394
8	MP	2,328
9	Ponnistus	2,196
10	Lahti-69	1,300
11	IKissat	1,144
12	TaPa	797
