= 1996 Ykkönen – Finnish League Division 1 =

Finnish League Division 1
- Season: 1996
- Champions: Hangö IK; TP-Seinäjoki
- Promoted: No teams promoted
- Relegated: Kultsu FC; Rakuunat; FC Kontu; KePS; Reipas; OPS

League tables for teams participating in Ykkönen, the second tier of the Finnish Soccer League system, in 1996.

== League tables ==
=== Etelälohko ===
Pos	Team	Pld	W	D	L	GF	GA	GD	Pts
1	Hangö IK, Hanko	27	19	3	5	62	21	+41	60
2	KTP, Kotka	27	15	7	5	35	17	+18	52
3	K-Team, Hämeenlinna	27	14	9	4	49	35	+14	51
4	TiPS, Vantaa	27	13	5	9	45	28	+17	44
5	FC Honka, Espoo	27	10	7	10	58	48	+10	37
6	IF Gnistan, Helsinki	27	10	6	11	29	39	−10	36
7	Ponnistus, Helsinki	27	9	7	11	42	51	−9	34
8	Kultsu FC, Joutseno	27	6	9	12	31	49	−18	27
9	Rakuunat, Lappeenranta	27	5	6	16	25	53	−28	21
10	FC Kontu, Helsinki	27	2	5	20	24	59	−35	11

=== Pohjoislohko ===
Pos	Team	Pld	W	D	L	GF	GA	GD	Pts
1	TP-Seinäjoki, Seinäjoki	27	19	5	3	44	17	+27	62
2	TPV, Tampere	27	16	6	5	52	26	+26	54
3	Kuusysi, Lahti	27	16	5	6	48	28	+20	53
4	Pallo-Iirot, Rauma	27	11	5	11	47	45	+2	38
5	GBK, Kokkola	27	10	7	10	47	45	+2	37
6	JJK, Jyväskylä	27	8	10	9	41	39	+2	34
7	KuPS, Kuopio	27	8	8	11	39	37	+2	32
8	KePS, Kemi	27	9	3	15	38	53	−15	30
9	Reipas, Lahti	27	6	11	10	35	47	−12	29
10	OPS, Oulu	27	1	2	24	14	68	−54	5

== Promotion play-offs ==
- HIK Hanko–TP-Seinäjoki 2–5
- TP-Seinäjoki–HIK Hanko 3–0

TP Seinäjoki won 8–2 on aggregate and proceeded to the next round

- HIK Hanko–HJK Helsinki 0–1
- HJK Helsinki–HIK Hanko 1–1

HJK won 2–1 on aggregate and remained in the Veikkausliiga.

== See also ==
- Veikkausliiga (Tier 1)
- 1996 Finnish Cup
