= 1965 Mestaruussarja =

Mestaruussarja
- Season: 1965
- Champions: Haka Valkeakoski
- Relegated: Upon Pallo Lahti, ÅIFK Turku, TaPa Tampere

Statistics of Mestaruussarja in the 1965 season.

== Overview ==
It was contested by 12 teams, and Haka Valkeakoski won the championship.

== League standings ==
Pos	Team	Pld	W	D	L	GF	GA	GD	Pts
1	Haka Valkeakoski (C)	22	14	3	5	56	28	+28	31
2	HJK Helsinki	22	12	5	5	50	30	+20	29
3	Reipas Lahti	22	9	7	6	44	24	+20	25
4	GBK Kokkola	22	9	7	6	32	32	0	25
5	HIFK Helsinki	22	9	4	9	25	27	−2	22
6	KuPS Kuopio	22	8	6	8	25	28	−3	22
7	IKissat Tampere	22	7	8	7	25	29	−4	22
8	KTP Kotka	22	8	5	9	41	43	−2	21
9	VPS Vaasa	22	9	3	10	30	48	−18	21
10	Upon Pallo Lahti (R)	22	8	4	10	35	28	+7	20
11	ÅIFK Turku (R)	22	5	6	11	21	31	−10	16
12	TaPa Tampere (R)	22	2	6	14	14	50	−36	10

Source: rsssf.com
(C) Champions; (R) Relegated

== Results ==
Home \ Away	GBK	HAK	HFK	HJK	ILV	KTP	KPS	REI	TPT	UP	VPS	ÅIF
GBK		0–1	1–0	1–0	2–2	3–3	2–1	0–0	0–0	1–0	2–2	3–0
FC Haka	4–0		3–3	0–1	0–3	4–1	3–0	3–0	7–1	3–1	7–0	2–1
HIFK	0–1	2–2		2–5	1–0	1–2	0–1	3–1	1–0	1–0	2–0	1–0
HJK Helsinki	7–3	0–2	1–0		4–0	5–3	2–0	2–2	4–0	3–1	2–2	1–1
I-Kissat	0–0	2–3	0–2	1–1		3–2	2–0	0–3	1–0	0–0	2–0	1–0
KTP	3–0	2–2	0–0	0–2	4–2		4–3	4–2	1–0	3–2	2–3	0–0
KuPS	3–1	1–3	2–2	1–0	0–0	1–0		0–0	3–1	2–0	1–0	1–1
Reipas	2–2	0–1	4–0	3–4	0–0	2–1	2–0		8–0	0–2	6–0	4–0
TaPa	0–5	0–2	1–2	1–4	0–0	2–2	1–1	0–0		1–2	1–3	2–3
UPallo	2–3	3–1	1–2	3–0	4–0	4–0	1–1	0–0	0–0		6–1	1–0
VPS	1–0	4–2	1–0	4–2	2–5	0–3	2–1	0–2	1–2	2–0		2–0
ÅIFK	1–2	3–1	1–0	0–0	1–1	2–1	1–2	2–3	0–1	4–2	0–0	

Legend: Blue = home team win; Yellow = draw; Red = away team win.
