= Lahden kisapuisto =

Stadium in Lahti, Finland

Coordinates: 60°59′11″N 25°39′01″E

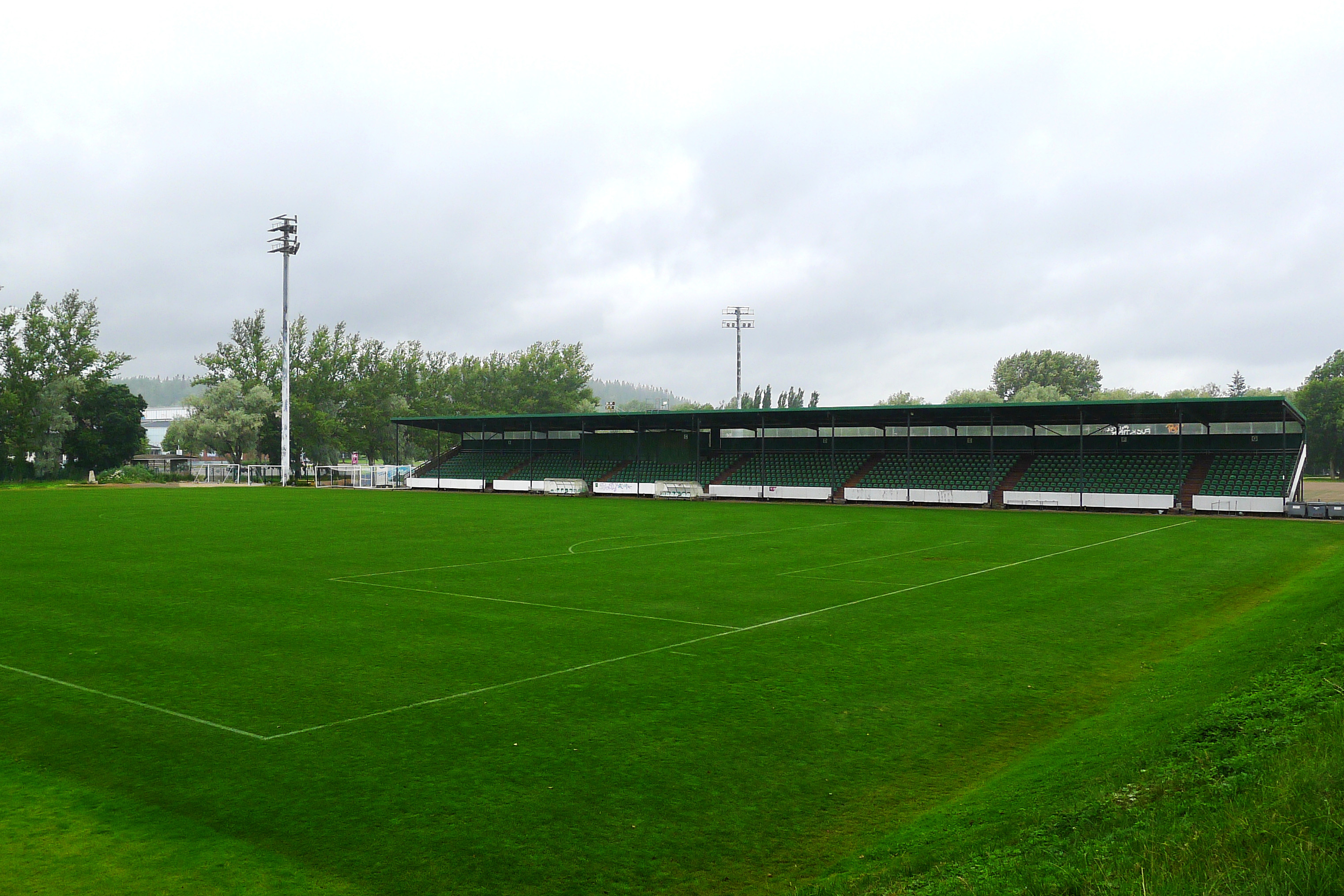
- Interactive map of Lahden kisapuisto
- Full name: Lahden kisapuisto
- Location: Lahti, Finland
- Owner: City of Lahti
- Operator: FC Lahti
- Capacity: 4,000 (Football)
- Surface: Grass

Construction
- Opened: 1952

Tenant
- FC Lahti

The Lahden kisapuisto is a multi-use stadium in Lahti, Finland. It is used mostly for football and hosts the home matches of FC Lahti. The stadium holds 4,000 people and is all-seater. It also hosted some football matches during the 1952 Summer Olympics.

== History ==
Lahden kisapuisto football stadium built for the 1952 Helsinki Olympic Games, for, during which it hosted the first two series of the football match and one post-match. These were Poland - France on 15 July, Luxembourg - United Kingdom on 16 July, as well as post-match Turkey - Curaçao on 21 July .

Some of the grandstand burned down on 29 October 2003, smoking among teenage girls accidentally set it on fire. The fire damage amounted to approximately EUR 30,000.

== Future ==
The stadium is decayed over the years, and as such no longer meet today's standards. Grandstand is installed bucket seats, but otherwise the field area is outdated condition, for example. Public toilets are very incomplete. In spring 2008, the Lahti Sports Hall Association updated its stadium plans previously developed to meet the requirements of today. This launched a wide-ranging debate on the project and the matter has been exhibited in the local media in abundance.
