= Ossi Vilppunen =

Finnish footballer (born 1936)

Personal information
- Date of birth: 10 March 1936 (age 90)

International career
Years	Team	Apps	(Gls)
1957	Finland	1	(0)

Ossi Vilppunen (born 10 March 1936) is a Finnish footballer. He played in one match for the Finland national football team in 1957.
