= 1987 Mestaruussarja =

Mestaruussarja
- Season: 1987

Statistics of the Mestaruussarja, the premier division of Finnish football, in the 1987 season.

== Overview ==
12 teams performed in the league, and HJK Helsinki won the championship.

== League standings ==
Pos	Team	Pld	W	D	L	GF	GA	GD	Pts
1	HJK Helsinki (C)	22	15	3	4	38	14	+24	33
2	Kuusysi Lahti	22	12	6	4	37	21	+16	30
3	TPS Turku	22	12	4	6	36	21	+15	28
4	Ilves Tampere	22	12	1	9	43	43	0	25
5	RoPS Rovaniemi	22	9	6	7	30	25	+5	24
6	PPT Pori	22	9	5	8	39	32	+7	23
7	MP Mikkeli	22	8	6	8	27	21	+6	22
8	KuPS Kuopio	22	8	5	9	34	39	−5	21
9	Haka Valkeakoski	22	7	5	10	30	36	−6	19
10	Reipas Lahti	22	4	6	12	20	43	−23	14
11	KePS Kemi (O)	22	5	3	14	19	33	−14	13
12	Koparit Kuopio (R)	22	1	10	11	17	42	−25	12

Source: rsssf.com
(C) Champions; (O) Play-off winners; (R) Relegated

== Results ==
Home \ Away	HAK	HJK	ILV	KEM	KPT	KPS	KUU	MP	PPT	REI	RPS	TPS
Haka		0–3	6–1	0–2	4–1	1–0	1–1	2–1	0–2	1–1	1–1	3–1
HJK Helsinki	2–0		1–0	1–0	1–0	1–2	0–0	1–1	3–0	3–0	5–0	1–0
Ilves	2–1	2–0		3–1	4–1	3–4	0–1	2–1	4–2	0–3	1–0	0–2
KePS	1–0	0–3	2–3		1–1	1–1	2–0	1–4	2–1	3–0	1–2	0–1
KPT	0–3	1–1	2–3	0–0		0–0	2–2	1–1	0–0	0–0	1–4	2–1
KuPS	4–2	0–2	0–4	4–1	1–1		2–2	0–2	3–1	4–0	0–2	0–1
Kuusysi	1–0	2–0	4–3	2–1	2–0	2–3		1–0	2–2	3–0	0–0	4–0
MP	0–0	1–2	2–4	1–0	1–0	2–0	0–1		1–3	1–1	3–0	0–0
PPT	4–1	2–1	1–2	3–0	6–0	1–1	3–2	0–1		3–2	1–1	1–3
Reipas	1–1	1–3	4–0	1–1	3–1	0–4	1–3	0–3	0–2		1–1	0–4
RoPS	2–3	0–1	4–1	1–0	1–0	6–0	0–2	1–1	2–0	1–1		1–0
TPS	5–0	2–3	1–1	1–0	3–3	4–1	1–0	1–0	1–1	2–0	2–0	

Legend: Blue = home team win; Yellow = draw; Red = away team win.

== Attendances ==
No.	Club	Average
1	HJK	5,106
2	Ilves	2,959
3	TPS	2,533
4	Kuusysi	2,505
5	RoPS	2,020
6	KuPS	1,886
7	PPT	1,520
8	KPS	1,517
9	Reipas	1,460
10	MP	1,361
11	Haka	1,220
12	Koparit	1,045

== See also ==
- Ykkönen (Tier 2)
