= 1989 Mestaruussarja =

Mestaruussarja
- Season: 1989

Statistics of Mestaruussarja in the 1989 season. Mestaruussarja changed the name to Veikkausliiga from season 1990.

== Overview ==
It was contested by 12 teams, and Kuusysi Lahti won the championship.

== Preliminary stage ==
=== Table ===
Pos	Team	Pld	W	D	L	GF	GA	GD	Pts
1	Kuusysi Lahti	22	13	6	3	44	22	+22	32
2	TPS Turku	22	12	8	2	37	17	+20	32
3	RoPS Rovaniemi	22	11	8	3	42	20	+22	30
4	Haka Valkeakoski	22	11	5	6	34	22	+12	27
5	HJK Helsinki	22	10	5	7	28	20	+8	25
6	Ilves Tampere	22	9	5	8	36	31	+5	23
7	KuPS Kuopio	22	9	5	8	30	30	0	23
8	Reipas Lahti	22	8	4	10	44	42	+2	20
9	MP Mikkeli	22	5	6	11	27	44	−17	16
10	OTP Oulu	22	4	7	11	19	38	−19	15
11	KePS Kemi	22	1	9	12	20	53	−33	11
12	Jaro Jakobstad	22	3	4	15	25	47	−22	10

Source: rsssf.com

=== Results ===
Home \ Away	HAK	HJK	ILV	JAR	KEM	KPS	KUU	MP	OTP	REI	RPS	TPS
FC Haka		0–0	1–1	4–1	1–0	2–0	0–1	1–0	4–0	3–0	0–0	0–1
HJK Helsinki	3–0		2–1	2–0	2–0	1–0	0–1	2–0	2–0	1–1	2–2	0–2
Ilves	1–3	2–0		5–1	1–1	3–0	1–2	4–2	4–0	0–1	0–0	2–5
Jaro	1–3	1–1	0–0		5–1	1–2	0–0	0–1	0–2	1–3	0–3	1–3
KePS	1–4	1–3	0–2	2–3		0–0	2–2	1–1	0–0	1–9	0–7	0–2
KuPS	3–1	1–2	3–0	3–1	0–0		2–1	1–0	1–2	3–0	1–0	1–1
Kuusysi	2–2	2–1	2–0	2–1	4–1	3–0		1–0	1–1	0–1	3–1	1–1
MP	1–1	2–1	5–1	1–5	3–6	3–0	0–4		1–0	1–1	1–1	0–2
OTP	1–2	0–0	0–2	0–0	1–1	1–4	3–1	3–1		2–3	0–1	1–1
Reipas	1–2	0–2	2–3	3–2	3–1	2–2	3–7	2–2	6–0		2–3	0–1
RoPS	2–0	2–1	0–0	2–1	1–1	4–1	1–1	6–1	2–1	3–1		0–0
TPS	2–0	2–0	1–3	4–0	1–0	2–2	1–3	1–1	1–1	2–0	3–1	

Legend: Blue = home team win; Yellow = draw; Red = away team win.

== Championship group ==
=== Table ===
Pos	Team	Pld	W	D	L	GF	GA	GD	Pts
1	Kuusysi Lahti (C)	27	17	7	3	51	23	+28	41
2	TPS Turku	27	15	9	3	46	21	+25	39
3	RoPS Rovaniemi	27	12	10	5	45	27	+18	34
4	Haka Valkeakoski	27	12	6	9	38	30	+8	30
5	HJK Helsinki	27	11	7	9	36	28	+8	29
6	Ilves Tampere	27	10	6	11	45	43	+2	26

Source: rsssf.com
(C) Champions

=== Results ===
Home \ Away	HAK	HJK	ILV	KUU	RPS	TPS
FC Haka			1–1			0–2
HJK Helsinki	1–3			1–1		
Ilves		2–5			4–0	
Kuusysi	3–0		1–0			1–0
RoPS	1–0	1–1		0–1		
TPS Turku		1–0	5–2		1–1	

Legend: Blue = home team win; Yellow = draw; Red = away team win.

== Relegation group ==
=== Table ===
Pos	Team	Pld	W	D	L	GF	GA	GD	Pts
1	KuPS Kuopio	27	12	5	10	39	37	+2	29
2	Reipas Lahti	27	11	5	11	56	48	+8	27
3	OTP Oulu	27	7	8	12	31	43	−12	22
4	MP Mikkeli	27	7	8	12	34	50	−16	22
5	KePS Kemi (Q, R)	27	2	10	15	27	66	−39	14
6	Jaro Pietarsaari (R)	27	3	5	19	27	59	−32	11

Source: rsssf.com
(Q) Qualified for the phase indicated; (R) Relegated

=== Results ===
Home \ Away	JAR	KEM	KPS	MP	OTP	REI
Jaro		1–2		0–3		
KePS			1–2		1–5	
KuPS	2–0				1–2	3–2
MP		2–2	2–1		0–0	
OTP	4–0					1–3
Reipas	1–1	3–1		3–0		

Legend: Blue = home team win; Yellow = draw; Red = away team win.

== Attendances ==
No.	Club	Average
1	HJK	5,034
2	Ilves	3,624
3	Kuusysi	3,060
4	TPS	2,758
5	RoPS	2,478
6	KuPS	2,468
7	Jaro	1,941
8	Reipas	1,792
9	Haka	1,432
10	KPS	1,401
11	Oulu	1,358
12	MP	908

== See also ==
- Ykkönen (Tier 2)
