= 1983 Mestaruussarja =

English Premier League season

Mestaruussarja
- Season: 1983

Statistics of Mestaruussarja in the 1983 season.

== Overview ==
Preliminary Stage is performed in 12 teams, and higher 8 teams go into Championship Group. Lower 4 teams fought in promotion/relegation group with higher 4 teams of Ykkönen.

Ilves Tampere won the championship.

== Preliminary stage ==
=== Table ===
| Pos | Team | Pld | W | D | L | GF | GA | GD | Pts |
|---|---|---|---|---|---|---|---|---|---|
| 1 | TPS Turku | 22 | 13 | 6 | 3 | 51 | 23 | +28 | 32 |
| 2 | Ilves Tampere | 22 | 12 | 5 | 5 | 49 | 28 | +21 | 29 |
| 3 | Haka Valkeakoski | 22 | 12 | 5 | 5 | 43 | 24 | +19 | 29 |
| 4 | Kuusysi Lahti | 22 | 11 | 6 | 5 | 42 | 21 | +21 | 28 |
| 5 | HJK Helsinki | 22 | 10 | 8 | 4 | 42 | 28 | +14 | 28 |
| 6 | RoPS Rovaniemi | 22 | 9 | 6 | 7 | 28 | 37 | −9 | 24 |
| 7 | KPV Kokkola | 22 | 8 | 7 | 7 | 26 | 31 | −5 | 23 |
| 8 | Koparit Kuopio | 22 | 7 | 7 | 8 | 38 | 31 | +7 | 21 |
| 9 | KuPS Kuopio | 22 | 7 | 4 | 11 | 27 | 31 | −4 | 18 |
| 10 | OPS Oulu | 22 | 7 | 3 | 12 | 37 | 53 | −16 | 17 |
| 11 | Reipas Lahti | 22 | 3 | 4 | 15 | 19 | 43 | −24 | 10 |
| 12 | KTP Kotka | 22 | 1 | 3 | 18 | 16 | 68 | −52 | 5 |

Source: rsssf.com

=== Results ===
| Home \ Away | HAK | HJK | ILV | KPT | KPV | KTP | KPS | KUU | OPS | REI | RPS | TPS |
|---|---|---|---|---|---|---|---|---|---|---|---|---|
| FC Haka | | 1–1 | 1–1 | 1–0 | 1–1 | 6–0 | 1–1 | 1–0 | 4–3 | 4–1 | 6–1 | 2–1 |
| HJK Helsinki | 2–0 | | 4–2 | 3–1 | 3–1 | 2–2 | 2–1 | 0–2 | 1–2 | 3–1 | 1–1 | 2–2 |
| Ilves | 2–2 | 1–2 | | 3–1 | 2–1 | 2–1 | 4–0 | 2–2 | 4–2 | 0–0 | 8–2 | 2–0 |
| Koparit | 3–1 | 0–0 | 1–2 | | 2–2 | 4–0 | 0–2 | 2–1 | 2–1 | 1–1 | 1–1 | 0–1 |
| KPV | 0–4 | 3–0 | 1–0 | 3–1 | | 3–1 | 2–1 | 0–0 | 1–3 | 1–0 | 0–1 | 1–1 |
| KTP | 0–2 | 0–0 | 1–5 | 1–4 | 1–2 | | 2–1 | 1–2 | 4–4 | 0–2 | 0–2 | 0–1 |
| KuPS | 0–1 | 1–5 | 2–0 | 1–4 | 0–0 | 3–0 | | 1–2 | 2–0 | 3–0 | 0–2 | 5–1 |
| Kuusysi | 2–0 | 2–2 | 0–2 | 1–1 | 3–0 | 3–1 | 1–2 | | 3–0 | 1–0 | 5–0 | 2–2 |
| OPS | 2–0 | 1–5 | 3–4 | 1–6 | 1–1 | 4–0 | 2–0 | 1–4 | | 2–2 | 1–0 | 1–2 |
| Reipas | 0–2 | 1–4 | 0–2 | 1–0 | 1–2 | 6–0 | 1–1 | 0–4 | 0–2 | | 0–1 | 0–2 |
| RoPS | 1–2 | 0–0 | 1–0 | 2–2 | 5–1 | 3–0 | 0–0 | 0–0 | 2–1 | 3–1 | | 0–3 |
| TPS | 2–1 | 3–0 | 1–1 | 2–2 | 0–0 | 7–1 | 1–0 | 3–2 | 6–0 | 5–1 | 5–0 | |

Legend: Blue = home team win; Yellow = draw; Red = away team win.

== Championship group ==
=== Table ===
| Pos | Team | Pld | W | D | L | GF | GA | GD | Pts |
|---|---|---|---|---|---|---|---|---|---|
| 1 | Ilves Tampere (C) | 29 | 17 | 7 | 5 | 63 | 32 | +31 | 27 |
| 2 | HJK Helsinki | 29 | 15 | 9 | 5 | 61 | 37 | +24 | 25 |
| 3 | Haka Valkeakoski | 29 | 17 | 5 | 7 | 59 | 36 | +23 | 25 |
| 4 | TPS Turku | 29 | 16 | 8 | 5 | 64 | 32 | +32 | 24 |
| 5 | Kuusysi Lahti | 29 | 13 | 7 | 9 | 54 | 37 | +17 | 19 |
| 6 | KPV Kokkola | 29 | 8 | 11 | 10 | 32 | 44 | −12 | 16 |
| 7 | Koparit Kuopio | 29 | 8 | 9 | 12 | 46 | 48 | −2 | 15 |
| 8 | RoPS Rovaniemi | 29 | 9 | 8 | 12 | 36 | 53 | −17 | 14 |

Source: rsssf.com
(C) Champions

The points were halved (rounded upwards in uneven cases) after the preliminary stage.

=== Results ===
| Home \ Away | HAK | HJK | ILV | KPT | KPV | KUU | RPS | TPS |
|---|---|---|---|---|---|---|---|---|
| FC Haka | | | 1–4 | | 2–0 | | 4–0 | 2–1 |
| HJK Helsinki | 2–3 | | | | | | 1–0 | 4–1 |
| Ilves | | 1–1 | | 3–0 | 2–0 | 1–0 | | |
| Koparit | 2–3 | 1–4 | | | | 4–1 | | |
| KPV | | 1–4 | | 0–0 | | 2–2 | | |
| Kuusysi | 3–1 | 2–3 | | | | | 4–3 | 0–2 |
| RoPS | | | 2–3 | 0–0 | 2–2 | | | |
| TPS | | | 0–0 | 6–1 | 1–1 | | 2–1 | |

Legend: Blue = home team win; Yellow = draw; Red = away team win.

== Promotion/relegation group ==
=== Table ===
| Pos | Team | Pld | W | D | L | GF | GA | GD | BP | Pts |
|---|---|---|---|---|---|---|---|---|---|---|
| 1 | KuPS Kuopio | 7 | 6 | 0 | 1 | 19 | 5 | +14 | 4 | 16 |
| 2 | MP Mikkeli (P) | 7 | 5 | 0 | 2 | 24 | 7 | +17 | 4 | 14 |
| 3 | KePS Kemi (P) | 7 | 5 | 1 | 1 | 16 | 7 | +9 | 2 | 13 |
| 4 | PPT Pori (P) | 7 | 3 | 2 | 2 | 22 | 17 | +5 | 3 | 11 |
| 5 | Jaro Pietarsaari | 7 | 4 | 0 | 3 | 23 | 19 | +4 | 1 | 9 |
| 6 | OPS Oulu (R) | 7 | 2 | 0 | 5 | 17 | 23 | −6 | 3 | 7 |
| 7 | Reipas Lahti (R) | 7 | 1 | 1 | 5 | 14 | 17 | −3 | 2 | 5 |
| 8 | KTP Kotka (R) | 7 | 0 | 0 | 7 | 5 | 45 | −40 | 1 | 1 |

Source: rsssf.com
(P) Promoted; (R) Relegated

The teams obtained bonus points on the basis of their preliminary stage position.

=== Results ===
| Home \ Away | JAR | KEM | KTP | KPS | MPM | OPS | PPT | REI |
|---|---|---|---|---|---|---|---|---|
| Jaro | | 0–1 | 6–2 | | | | 6–3 | |
| KePS | | | | | 3–0 | 4–0 | | 4–2 |
| KTP | | 1–2 | | | 1–5 | | 1–9 | |
| KuPS | 4–1 | 2–0 | 6–0 | | | | 4–0 | |
| MP | 5–0 | | | 3–0 | | 6–1 | | 4–0 |
| OPS | 4–6 | | 8–0 | 1–2 | | | | 2–1 |
| PPT | | 2–2 | | | 2–1 | 4–1 | | 2–2 |
| Reipas | 0–4 | | 9–0 | 0–1 | | | | |

Legend: Blue = home team win; Yellow = draw; Red = away team win.

== Attendances ==
| No. | Club | Average |
|---|---|---|
| 1 | Ilves | 4,069 |
| 2 | HJK | 3,243 |
| 3 | RoPS | 2,390 |
| 4 | Koparit | 2,144 |
| 5 | Kuusysi | 1,975 |
| 6 | Haka | 1,960 |
| 7 | TPS | 1,670 |
| 8 | KuPS | 1,473 |
| 9 | KPV | 1,259 |
| 10 | KTP | 1,158 |
| 11 | Reipas | 949 |
| 12 | OPS | 881 |

== See also ==
- Ykkönen (Tier 2)
