= 1984 Mestaruussarja =

Mestaruussarja
- Season: 1984

Statistics of Mestaruussarja in the 1984 season.

== Overview ==
It was contested by 12 teams, and Kuusysi Lahti won the championship.

== Preliminary stage ==
=== Table ===
Pos	Team	Pld	W	D	L	GF	GA	GD	Pts
1	Haka Valkeakoski (Q)	22	11	9	2	43	26	+17	31
2	TPS Turku (Q)	22	11	7	4	56	31	+25	29
3	Kuusysi Lahti (C, Q)	22	10	8	4	41	24	+17	28
4	Ilves Tampere (Q)	22	12	4	6	42	28	+14	28
5	HJK Helsinki	22	10	6	6	49	37	+12	26
6	RoPS Rovaniemi	22	9	6	7	33	38	−5	24
7	KePS Kemi	22	7	7	8	35	36	−1	21
8	KuPS Kuopio	22	6	7	9	25	32	−7	19
9	PPT Pori	22	7	3	12	32	42	−10	17
10	Koparit Kuopio (O)	22	3	9	10	23	28	−5	15
11	KPV Kokkola (O)	22	6	3	13	30	56	−26	15
12	MP Mikkeli (R)	22	2	7	13	22	53	−31	11

Source: rsssf.com
(C) Champions; (O) Play-off winners; (Q) Qualified for the phase indicated; (R) Relegated

=== Results ===
Home \ Away	HAK	HJK	ILV	KEM	KPT	KPV	KPS	KUU	MP	PPT	RPS	TPS
FC Haka		3–2	1–5	1–0	2–0	2–1	0–0	1–1	1–1	4–2	7–0	1–3
HJK Helsinki	1–1		1–3	4–1	4–3	3–0	2–1	2–2	1–2	2–3	3–0	3–2
Ilves	1–3	3–1		1–3	1–0	0–2	3–1	2–3	1–1	0–1	2–1	2–0
KePS	0–0	1–1	1–3		1–5	0–0	2–0	1–1	4–0	3–0	2–3	0–1
Koparit	1–1	3–0	1–3	0–1		1–2	0–0	1–1	0–0	1–2	0–1	1–1
KPV	3–3	0–0	0–4	4–2	0–1		0–6	1–4	6–0	3–2	0–4	2–3
KuPS	0–0	1–5	0–2	2–2	1–0	2–1		3–3	3–0	1–0	0–2	0–5
Kuusysi	0–1	0–2	4–0	3–3	0–0	3–1	2–0		3–0	2–1	2–0	1–0
MP	1–2	3–3	1–1	1–2	1–1	1–3	0–2	1–0		1–2	3–5	3–3
PPT	1–4	1–4	1–3	1–2	2–2	5–0	1–1	0–4	3–1		2–0	0–1
RoPS	1–1	2–3	0–0	1–1	0–0	3–0	1–0	3–1	4–1	1–1		1–1
TPS	2–4	2–2	2–2	4–3	4–2	7–1	1–1	1–1	3–0	2–1	8–0	

Legend: Blue = home team win; Yellow = draw; Red = away team win.

== Championship Playoffs ==
=== Semifinals ===
Team 1	Agg.	Team 2	1st leg	2nd leg
Kuusysi Lahti	3–2	Haka Valkeakoski	2–0	1–2
Ilves Tampere	2–5	TPS Turku	2–1	0–4

=== For Third Place ===
Team 1	Agg.	Team 2	1st leg	2nd leg
Ilves Tampere	3–1	Haka Valkeakoski	2–1	1–0

=== Finals ===
Team 1	Agg.	Team 2	1st leg	2nd leg
Kuusysi Lahti	8–4	TPS Turku	4–0	4–4

== Attendances ==
No.	Club	Average
1	HJK	5,049
2	Ilves	2,681
3	Kuusysi	2,530
4	RoPS	2,422
5	TPS	2,383
6	KuPS	2,321
7	Jazz	2,301
8	Haka	2,150
9	Koparit	1,749
10	KPS	1,599
11	KPV	1,392
12	MP	1,167

== See also ==
- Ykkönen (Tier 2)
