= 1986 Mestaruussarja =

Mestaruussarja
- Season: 1986

Statistics of Mestaruussarja in the 1986 season.

== Overview ==
It was contested by 12 teams, and Kuusysi Lahti won the championship.

== League standings ==
Pos	Team	Pld	W	D	L	GF	GA	GD	Pts
1	Kuusysi Lahti (C)	22	13	6	3	40	20	+20	32
2	TPS Turku	22	12	6	4	35	15	+20	30
3	HJK Helsinki	22	10	10	2	42	23	+19	30
4	RoPS Rovaniemi	22	12	6	4	32	14	+18	30
5	Haka Valkeakoski	22	8	6	8	32	27	+5	22
6	Ilves Tampere	22	9	4	9	39	36	+3	22
7	MP Mikkeli	22	6	6	10	27	37	−10	18
8	PPT Pori	22	5	8	9	27	40	−13	18
9	Koparit Kuopio	22	4	10	8	18	32	−14	18
10	KuPS Kuopio	22	7	4	11	23	38	−15	18
11	KePS Kemi (O)	22	4	7	11	23	31	−8	15
12	OTP Oulu (R)	22	4	3	15	16	41	−25	11

Source: rsssf.com
(C) Champions; (O) Play-off winners; (R) Relegated

== Results ==
Home \ Away	HAK	KUU	HJK	ILV	KEM	KPT	KPS	MP	OTP	PPT	RPS	TPS
FC Haka		1–0	0–0	0–0	1–0	4–0	2–3	3–0	1–1	5–1	3–0	0–0
Kuusysi	0–0		3–1	4–0	5–0	1–1	2–1	3–1	4–2	3–2	1–0	1–0
HJK Helsinki	6–2	4–3		4–3	1–1	3–0	4–1	2–2	3–1	1–1	0–1	0–0
Ilves	3–2	1–2	0–2		1–1	1–0	3–1	3–1	7–0	4–0	0–2	1–3
KePS	3–1	1–2	1–4	0–1		0–0	0–1	6–2	3–0	0–0	0–0	0–3
Koparit	2–1	0–0	1–1	4–4	2–1		1–1	1–0	1–0	1–1	1–1	0–4
KuPS	1–0	0–2	2–2	0–1	1–1	1–1		0–2	1–0	4–2	0–3	2–1
MP	1–2	2–2	1–1	1–1	2–1	0–0	3–0		1–2	1–0	1–0	1–2
OTP	0–1	0–1	0–1	0–1	0–2	2–1	1–2	1–0		2–2	2–4	2–0
PPT	2–2	0–0	0–0	5–3	2–1	2–0	2–1	1–2	1–0		0–4	1–2
RoPS	2–1	1–1	0–2	1–0	2–1	2–0	3–0	1–1	4–0	0–0		0–0
TPS	2–0	2–0	0–0	3–1	0–0	2–1	2–0	5–2	0–0	4–2	0–1	

Legend: Blue = home team win; Yellow = draw; Red = away team win.

== Attendances ==
No.	Club	Average
1	HJK	6,770
2	Ilves	3,443
3	Kuusysi	2,990
4	TPS	2,740
5	RoPS	2,386
6	KuPS	2,080
7	KPS	1,611
8	Jazz	1,513
9	Haka	1,382
10	MP	1,285
11	Koparit	1,178
12	Oulu	986

== See also ==
- Ykkönen (Tier 2)
