= 1993 Nehru Cup =

Tournament details
- Host country: India
- Dates: 19 January – 3 February
- Teams: 7 (from 4 confederations)
- Venue: 1 (in 1 host city)

Final positions
- Champions: North Korea (1st title)
- Runners-up: Romania B

Tournament statistics
- Matches played: 15
- Goals scored: 38 (2.53 per match)
- Top scorer: (North Korea) Choi Yong-san (6 goals)
- Best player: (India) I. M. Vijayan
- Fair play award: India

The 1993 Nehru Cup was held in Madras at the Jawaharlal Nehru Stadium. This was the 10th edition of the Nehru Cup. The participating teams were North Korea, Russia, Finland, Bolivia, Cameroon, and India. North Korea won the cup, but the Man of the Tournament was India's Vijayan.

== Group A ==
Team	Pld	W	D	L	GF	GA	GD	Pts	Qualification
North Korea	3	2	1	0	6	4	+2	7	Semi-final
Romania B	3	1	2	0	6	4	+2	5	Semi-final
Russia	3	1	1	1	3	3	0	4	Eliminated
Bolivia	3	0	0	3	2	6	−4	0	Eliminated

Note: none of the matches in this group are full A-internationals

19 January 1993

North Korea	2–1	Bolivia
Kwang-min ?'; Yong-son ?'	Report	Takeo ?'

21 January 1993

Romania B	1–1	Russia
Craioveanu 5'	Report	Sabitov 16'

23 January 1993

Romania B	2–0	Bolivia
Strizu 32'; Craioveanu 62'	Report

25 January 1993

Russia	2–1	Bolivia
Nikulkin 16'; Garin 26'	Report	Antelo 39'

27 January 1993

Romania B	3–3	North Korea
Craioveanu 52'; Luca 54'; Militaru 60'	Report	Won-nam 29'; Yong-son 42', 70'

29 January 1993

North Korea	1–0	Russia
Yong-ha 84'	Report

== Group B ==
Team	Pld	W	D	L	GF	GA	GD	Pts	Qualification
Cameroon	4	1	3	0	5	3	+2	6	Semi-final
Finland	4	1	2	1	2	2	0	5	Semi-final
India (H)	4	0	3	1	3	5	−2	3	Eliminated

(H) Host
20 January 1993
16:45

Finland	0–0	India
	Report

Jawaharlal Nehru Stadium
Attendance: 10,000
Referee: Sagar Sen (India)

22 January 1993
17:15

Cameroon	0–0	Finland
	Report

Jawaharlal Nehru Stadium
Attendance: 8,000
Referee: Sirai Ahmed Saudagar (India)

24 January 1993

India	1–1	Cameroon
Vijayan ?'	Report	Maouadjo 46'

26 January 1993
17:15

India	0–2	Finland
	Report	Tauriainen 60'; Rajamäki 62'

Jawaharlal Nehru Stadium
Attendance: 25,000
Referee: Badruddin Badhu Badruddin (Bangladesh)

28 January 1993
17:15

Cameroon	2–0	Finland
Bekima ?'; Moosa ?'	Report

Jawaharlal Nehru Stadium
Attendance: 7,000
Referee: Gautam Kar (India)

30 January 1993

India	2–2	Cameroon
Sathyan 49'; Ansari 58'	Report	Kom 11'; Syalla 20'

Attendance: 25,000

== Knock-out stage ==
Semi-finals
31 January
North Korea	3
Finland	2
1 February
Romania B	4
Cameroon	0

Final
3 February
North Korea	2
Romania B	0

=== Semi-finals ===
31 January 1993
16:45

North Korea	3–2	Finland
Yong-son 33', 41'; Song-gun 73'	Report	Karvinen 67'; Rajamäki 71'

Jawaharlal Nehru Stadium
Attendance: 17,500
Referee: Sirai Ahmed Saudagar (India)

1 February 1993

Romania B	4–0	Cameroon
Pușcaș 16'; Ștefan 39'; Albeanu 45'; Craioveanu 50' (pen.); Craioveanu (red card) ?'	Report	Georges (red card) ?'; Bekima (red card) ?'

Referee: Sagar Sen (India)

=== Final ===
3 February 1993

North Korea	2–0	Romania B
Yong-son 39'; Kwang-min 78'	Report

Attendance: 38,000
Referee: Sumantha Ghosh (India)

== Winners ==
1993 Nehru Cup champion

North Korea
First title

== Statistics ==
=== Goalscorers ===
There were 38 goals scored in 15 matches, for an average of 2.53 goals per match.

6 goals

- (North Korea) Choi Yong-son

4 goals

- (Romania) Gheorghe Craioveanu

2 goals

- (Finland) Marko Rajamäki
- (North Korea) Kim Kwang-min

1 goal

- (Bolivia) Francisco Takeo
- (Bolivia) Víctor Hugo Antelo
- (Cameroon) Djang Maouadjo
- (Cameroon) Charles Bemima
- (Cameroon) Alexis Syalla
- (Cameroon) Moosa
- (Cameroon) Kom
- (Finland) Karvinen
- (Finland) Pasi Tauriainen
- (India) Aqueel Ansari
- (India) I.M. Vijayan
- (India) V. P. Sathyan
- (North Korea) Ryu Song-gun
- (North Korea) Choi Won-nam
- (North Korea) Kim Yong-ha
- (Romania) Cristian Pușcaș
- (Romania) Valentin Ștefan
- (Romania) Cristian Albeanu
- (Romania) Leonard Strizu
- (Romania) Constantin Luca
- (Romania) Damian Militaru
- (Russia) Ravil Sabitov
- (Russia) Vitali Nikulkin
- (Russia) Oleg Garin
