= Aarno Turpeinen =

Finnish footballer (1971–2022)

Personal information
- Date of birth: 21 March 1971
- Place of birth: Oulu, Finland
- Date of death: 8 June 2022 (aged 51)
- Position: Defender

Senior career*
Years	Team	Apps	(Gls)
1989–1991	OTP	58	(0)
1992	FC Oulu	30	(0)
1993–1994	RoPS	51	(3)
1995–2004	HJK	225	(4)
Total		364	(7)

International career
1996–2002	Finland	16	(0)
- * Club domestic league appearances and goals

Aarno Turpeinen (21 March 1971 – 8 June 2022) was a Finnish professional footballer who played as a defender. In the 1998–99 season, Turpeinen was part of the HJK Helsinki squad that reached the group phase of UEFA Champions League as the first and only Finnish club to this day.

== Career statistics ==
=== Club ===
As of 1 September 2024.

Appearances and goals by club, season and competition
Club	Season	League			Cup (Note: Includes Suomen Cup)		Europe		Total	
Club	Season	Division	Apps	Goals	Apps	Goals	Apps	Goals	Apps	Goals
OTP	1989	Mestaruussarja	7	0	–		–		7	0
OTP	1990	Veikkausliiga	19	0	–		–		19	0
OTP	1991	Veikkausliiga	33	0	–		–		33	0
OTP	Total		59	0	0	0	0	0	59	0
FC Oulu	1992	Veikkausliiga	30	0	–		–		30	0
RoPS	1993	Veikkausliiga	26	2	–		–		26	2
RoPS	1994	Veikkausliiga	25	1	–		–		25	1
RoPS	Total		51	3	0	0	0	0	51	3
HJK Helsinki	1995	Veikkausliiga	11	0	–		2 (Note: Appearances in UEFA Intertoto Cup)	0	13	0
HJK Helsinki	1996	Veikkausliiga	24	0	1	0	4 (Note: Appearances in UEFA Cup)	0	29	0
HJK Helsinki	1997	Veikkausliiga	24	0	–		1 (Note: Appearances in UEFA Cup Winners' Cup)	0	25	0
HJK Helsinki	1998	Veikkausliiga	25	0	1	0	6 (Note: Appearances in UEFA Champions League)	0	32	0
HJK Helsinki	1999	Veikkausliiga	22	0	–		4	0	26	0
HJK Helsinki	2000	Veikkausliiga	30	2	1	0	4	0	35	2
HJK Helsinki	2001	Veikkausliiga	26	1	–		4	0	30	1
HJK Helsinki	2002	Veikkausliiga	28	0	–		2	0	30	0
HJK Helsinki	2003	Veikkausliiga	25	0	1	0	2	0	28	0
HJK Helsinki	2004	Veikkausliiga	10	1	–		2	0	12	1
HJK Helsinki	Total		225	4	4	0	32	0	261	4
Career total			365	7	4	0	32	0	401	7

=== International ===
As of 31 December 2002

Finland
Year	Apps	Goals
1996	1	0
1997	3	0
1998	8	0
1999	0	0
2000	2	0
2001	0	0
2002	2	0
Total	16	0

== Honours ==
HJK

- Veikkausliiga: 1997, 2002, 2003
- Finnish Cup: 1996, 1998, 2000, 2003
