= Jukka Koskinen (footballer) =

Finnish footballer (born 1972)

Personal information
- Full name: Jukka Koskinen
- Date of birth: 29 November 1972 (age 53)
- Place of birth: Lahti, Finland
- Positions: Centre-back; defensive midfielder

Senior career*
| Years | Team | Apps | (Gls) |
| 1989–1990 | Reipas Lahti | 21 | (1) |
| 1991–1997 | MyPa | 133 | (7) |
| 1997–1999 | Willem II | 25 | (1) |
| 1999 | Anyang LG Cheetahs | 12 | (0) |
| 2000–2002 | Haka | 37 | (2) |
| 2003–2005 | Lahti | 50 | (5) |

International career
| 1996–1998 | Finland | 17 | (1) |
- * Club domestic league appearances and goals

Jukka Koskinen (born 29 November 1972) is a Finnish former footballer who played as a defender. His clubs included Willem II Tilburg in the Netherlands, Anyang LG Cheetahs of the South Korean K League, Reipas Lahti, MyPa, FC Haka and FC Lahti in Finland.

== Career statistics ==
=== Club ===
As of 7 May 2024

Appearances and goals by club, season and competition
| Club | Season | League | | | Domestic Cups (Note: Includes Suomen Cup) | | Europe | | Total | |
| Club | Season | Division | Apps | Goals | Apps | Goals | Apps | Goals | Apps | Goals |
|---|---|---|---|---|---|---|---|---|---|---|
| Reipas Lahti | 1989 | Ykkönen | 5 | 0 | – | | – | | 5 | 0 |
| Reipas Lahti | 1990 | Veikkausliiga | 16 | 1 | – | | – | | 16 | 1 |
| Reipas Lahti | Total | | 21 | 1 | 0 | 0 | 0 | 0 | 21 | 1 |
| MyPa | 1990 | Ykkönen | 14 | 1 | – | | – | | 14 | 1 |
| MyPa | 1991 | Veikkausliiga | 6 | 1 | – | | – | | 6 | 1 |
| MyPa | 1992 | Veikkausliiga | 33 | 4 | – | | – | | 33 | 4 |
| MyPa | 1993 | Veikkausliiga | 18 | 1 | – | | 1 (Note: Includes UEFA Cup Winners' Cup) | 0 | 19 | 1 |
| MyPa | 1994 | Veikkausliiga | 10 | 0 | – | | 3 (Note: Includes UEFA Cup) | 0 | 13 | 0 |
| MyPa | 1995 | Veikkausliiga | 26 | 0 | – | | 4 | 0 | 30 | 0 |
| MyPa | 1996 | Veikkausliiga | 17 | 0 | – | | 4 | 0 | 21 | 0 |
| MyPa | 1997 | Veikkausliiga | 9 | 0 | – | | – | | 9 | 0 |
| MyPa | Total | | 133 | 7 | 0 | 0 | 12 | 0 | 145 | 7 |
| Willem II | 1997–1998 | Eredivisie | 20 | 1 | 0 | 0 | – | | 20 | 1 |
| Willem II | 1998–99 | Eredivisie | 5 | 0 | 0 | 0 | 0 | 0 | 5 | 0 |
| Willem II | Total | | 25 | 1 | 0 | 0 | 0 | 0 | 25 | 1 |
| Anyang LG Cheetahs | 1999 | K League 1 | 12 | 0 | 0 | 0 | – | | 12 | 0 |
| Haka | 2000 | Veikkausliiga | 7 | 0 | 0 | 0 | 4 (Note: Includes UEFA Champions League) | 0 | 11 | 0 |
| Haka | 2001 | Veikkausliiga | 17 | 1 | 0 | 0 | – | | 17 | 1 |
| Haka | 2002 | Veikkausliiga | 13 | 1 | 0 | 0 | 2 (Note: Includes UEFA) | 0 | 15 | 1 |
| Haka | Total | | 37 | 2 | 0 | 0 | 6 | 0 | 43 | 2 |
| Lahti | 2003 | Veikkausliiga | 26 | 3 | – | | – | | 26 | 3 |
| Lahti | 2004 | Veikkausliiga | 19 | 2 | – | | – | | 19 | 2 |
| Lahti | 2005 | Veikkausliiga | 5 | 0 | – | | – | | 5 | 0 |
| Lahti | Total | | 50 | 5 | 0 | 0 | 0 | 0 | 43 | 2 |
| Career total | | | 270 | 16 | 0 | 0 | 18 | 0 | 278 | 25 |

=== International ===
As of match played 22 April 1998

Finland
| Year | Apps | Goals |
|---|---|---|
| 1995 | 1 | 0 |
| 1996 | 6 | 1 |
| 1997 | 9 | 0 |
| 1998 | 1 | 0 |
| Total | 17 | 1 |

=== International goals ===
As of match played 13 February 1996. Finland score listed first, score column indicates score after each Koskinen goal.

List of international goals scored by Jukka Koskinen
| No. | Date | Venue | Opponent | Score | Result | Competition |
|---|---|---|---|---|---|---|
| 1 | 13 February 1996 | Rajamangala Stadium, Bangkok, Thailand | Romania | 1–0 | 1–1 | King's Cup |

== Honours ==
Haka

- Veikkausliiga: 2000

MyPa

- Finnish Cup: 1995
