= Vesa Tauriainen =

Finnish footballer (born 1967)

Personal information
- Date of birth: 16 December 1967 (age 58)
- Place of birth: Rovaniemi, Finland
- Height: 1.85 m (6 ft 1 in)
- Position: Forward

Youth career
- 1978–1985: RoPs

Senior career*
Years	Team	Apps	(Gls)
1985–1988	RoPs	54	(16)
1989	Kiruna	24	(12)
1990–1991	RoPs	56	(18)
1992	FC Oulu	30	(9)
1993	HJK	28	(4)
1994–1996	Jaro	48	(11)
1997	Santa Claus	13	(7)
1998	Lira	18	(11)
1999	RoPs	23	(2)
2000	Santa Claus		

International career
1985	Finland U17	6	(2)
1988–1989	Finland U21	5	(0)
1990	Finland	1	(0)

Managerial career
- 2004–2005: MyPa (assistant)
- 2007: KooTeePee
- 2012–2015: RoPs (assistant)
- 2012–2015: Santa Claus
- 2017: Santa Claus
- 2018–2019: RoPs II
- 2020: RoPs
- * Club domestic league appearances and goals

Vesa Tauriainen (born 16 December 1967) is a Finnish former international footballer and a football manager.

== Coaching career ==
In September 2020, Tauriainen's contract with RoPs was terminated, and he was replaced as head coach by Mikko Mannila.

== Personal life ==
He is the brother of fellow professional footballers Pasi Tauriainen and Kimmo Tauriainen, and the uncle of Jimi Tauriainen and Julius Tauriainen.

== Career statistics ==
=== Club ===
Club	Season	League			Cup		Continental		Other		Total	
Club	Season	Division	Apps	Goals	Apps	Goals	Apps	Goals	Apps	Goals	Apps	Goals
RoPs	1985	Mestaruussarja	–				0	0	–			
RoPs	1986	Mestaruussarja	–				0	0	–			
RoPs	1987	Mestaruussarja	–				3 (Note: Appearances in the UEFA Cup Winners' Cup)	0	–			
RoPs	1988	Mestaruussarja	–				2	0	–			
RoPs	Total		54	16	0	0	5	0	0	0	59	16
Kiruna	1989	Swedish Division 1	24	12	0	0	–		0	0	24	12
RoPs	1990	Veikkausliiga	25	4	0	0	2 (Note: Appearances in the UEFA Cup)	0	0	0	27	4
RoPs	1991	Veikkausliiga	31	14	0	0	0	0	0	0	31	14
RoPs	Total		56	18	0	0	2	0	0	0	58	18
FC Oulu	1992	Veikkausliiga	30	9	0	0	–		0	0	30	9
HJK	1993	Veikkausliiga	28	4	0	0	4 (Note: Two appearances in UEFA Champions League qualification, two appearances in the competition proper)	0	0	0	32	4
Jaro	1994	Veikkausliiga	8	3	0	0	0	0	0	0	8	3
Jaro	1995	Veikkausliiga	18	7	0	0	0	0	0	0	18	7
Jaro	1996	Veikkausliiga	22	1	0	0	3 (Note: Appearances in the UEFA Intertoto Cup)	0	0	0	25	1
Jaro	Total		48	11	0	0	3	0	0	0	51	11
Santa Claus	1997	Kakkonen	13	7	0	0	–		0	0	13	7
Lira	1998	Swedish Division 2	18	11	0	0	–		0	0	18	11
RoPs	1999	Veikkausliiga	23	2	0	0	–		0	0	23	2
Career total			294	90	0	0	14	0	0	0	308	90

=== International ===
National team	Year	Apps	Goals
Finland	1990	1	0
Total		1	0
