= Janne Lindberg =

Finnish footballer (born 1966)

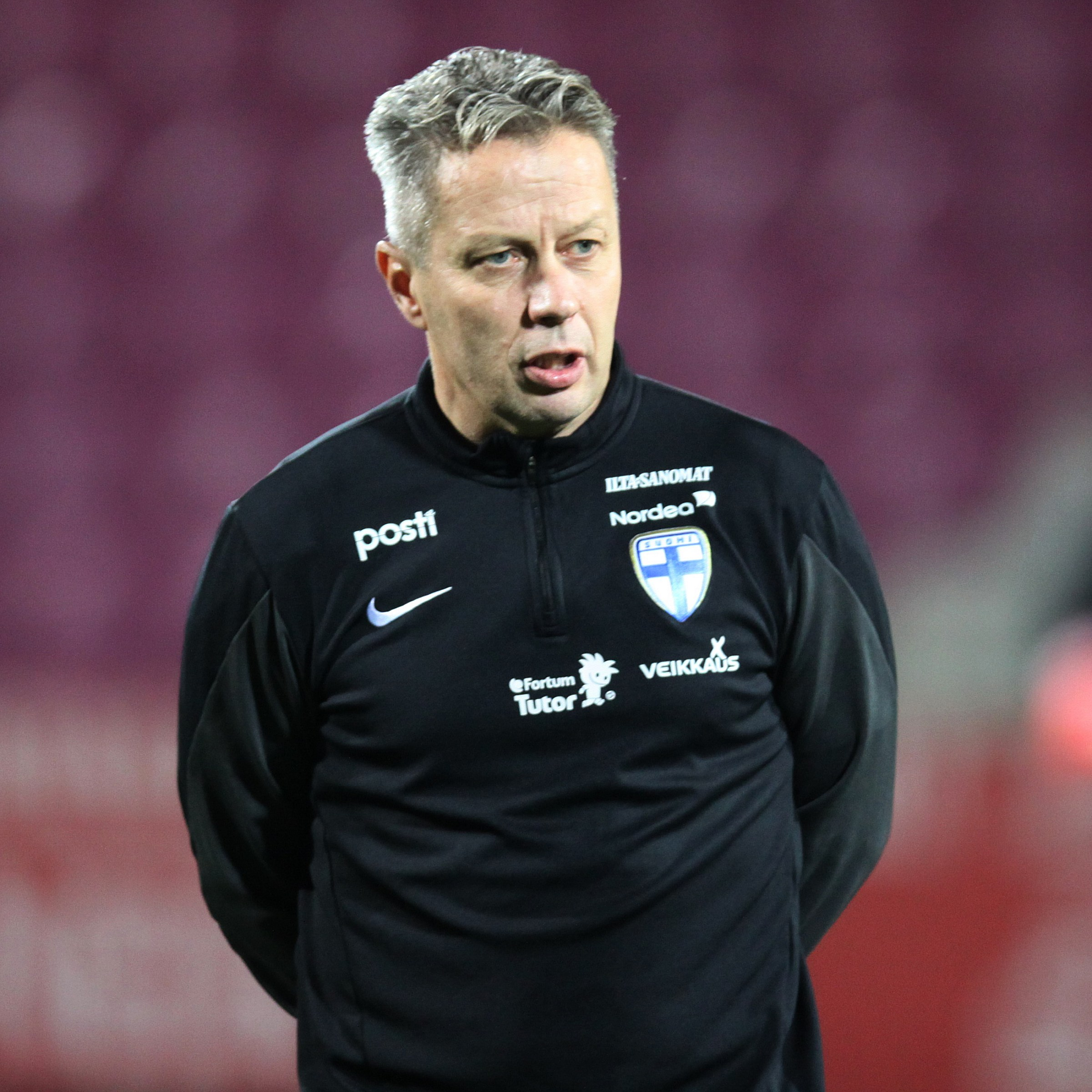
- Lindberg with Finland U21 in 2015

Personal information
- Date of birth: 24 May 1966 (age 60)
- Place of birth: Kuusankoski, Finland
- Height: 5 ft 7 in (1.70 m)
- Position: Midfielder

Youth career
- 1972–1988: Kuusankosken Kumu

Senior career*
Years	Team	Apps	(Gls)
1988–1990	Kuusankosken Kumu	104	(36)
1991	Haka	21	(4)
1992–1994	MyPa	83	(7)
1994–1997	Greenock Morton	75	(5)
1997–1998	1. FC Saarbrücken	24	(1)
1998–2005	MyPa	128	(7)

International career^{‡}
1993–1996	Finland	34	(1)

Managerial career
- 2007: VPS
- 2008–2010: MyPa
- 2011–2017: Sudet
- 2014–2017: Finland U21 (assistant)
- 2021–2023: VPS (sporting director)
- 2024–: MP (coaching coordinator)
- * Club domestic league appearances and goals as of 20:52, 30 April 2012 (UTC) ‡ National team caps and goals as of 28 July 2006

Janne Lindberg (born 24 May 1966) is a Finnish former professional footballer who works as a coaching coordinator for MP. Before that he worked as a sporting director of Veikkausliiga club VPS, but was fired at the end of 2023 for harassing scandal.

== Playing career ==
Lindberg joined his local club Kumu as a six-year-old boy where he stayed for 18 years. In 1990, at the age of 24, he moved onto Haka and after two years at Haka he transferred to MyPa.

At MyPa Lindberg established himself as a Finnish International, gaining the first of his 34 caps in 1992. He also experienced European football in the UEFA Cup.

In 1994, ex-Morton player Jimmy Pearson recommended Lindberg to then Greenock Morton manager Allan McGraw. As a result, Morton signed Lindberg at a cost of £250,000; a deal that included Lindberg's MyPa teammate and compatriot Marko Rajamäki.

Lindberg (and Rajamäki) made their débuts on 22 October 1994 against Berwick Rangers, a match Morton lost 2–1. However, both players went on to have impressive careers at Morton. Lindberg made approximately 88 appearances, scoring five goals.

In 1997 Lindberg's contract at Morton was not renewed and he signed for German side 1. FC Saarbrücken. His family did not settle in Germany, consequently he returned to former club MyPa in 1998 where he played until 2005.

== Coaching career ==
After a lengthy spell coaching at MyPa, he became coach at VPS.

In 2002 Lindberg was instrumental in the transfer of former Finnish Under 21 internationalist Jani Uotinen from MyPa to former club Morton.

In September 2008 Lindberg was appointed as the new head coach of MyPa care-taking the rest of the season after the manager Janne Hyppönen was sacked. Previously Lindberg had worked as an assistant of Hyppönen. He left this post in 2010 and joined another Kouvola-based club Sudet, which he coached until 2017.

During 2014–2017, Lindberg was an assistant coach of the Finland under-21 national team.

During 2021–2023, Lindberg worked as a sporting director of Veikkausliiga club Vaasan Palloseura (VPS). He was fired after the 2023 season, after it went public that he had sent several sexually harassing messages to female colleagues.

On 26 September 2024, Lindberg started as a coaching coordinator for the youth sector of Ykkösliiga club Mikkelin Palloilijat (MP).

== Career statistics ==
=== Club ===
Appearances and goals by club, season and competition
Club	Season	Division	League		Europe		Total	
Club	Season	Division	Apps	Goals	Apps	Goals	Apps	Goals
Kuusankosken Kumu	1984	Kakkonen			–			
Sudet	1985	Kakkonen			–			
Kuusankosken Kumu	1986	Kakkonen			–			
Kuusankosken Kumu	1987	Kakkonen			–			
Kuusankosken Kumu	1988	Kakkonen			–			
Kuusankosken Kumu	1989	Ykkönen	21	5	–		21	5
Kuusankosken Kumu	1990	Veikkausliiga	17	2	–		17	2
Kuusankosken Kumu	Total		104	36	0	0	104	36
Haka	1991	Veikkausliiga	21	4	–		21	4
MYPA	1992	Veikkausliiga	32	1	–		32	1
MYPA	1993	Veikkausliiga	27	3	2 (Note: Appearances in UEFA Cup Winners' Cup)	0	29	3
MYPA	1994	Veikkausliiga	24	3	4 (Note: Appearances in UEFA Cup)	0	28	3
MYPA	Total		83	7	6	0	89	7
Greenock Morton	1994–95	Scottish Second Division	25	1	–		25	1
Greenock Morton	1995–96	Scottish First Division	26	2	–		26	2
Greenock Morton	1996–97	Scottish First Division	24	2	–		24	2
Greenock Morton	Total		75	5	0	0	75	5
1. FC Saarbrücken	1997–98	Regionalliga West/Südwest	24	1	–		24	1
MYPA	1998	Veikkausliiga	15	0	–		15	0
MYPA	1999	Veikkausliiga	26	2	–		26	2
MYPA	2000	Veikkausliiga	24	4	2 (Note: Appearances in UEFA Intertoto Cup)	2	26	6
MYPA	2001	Veikkausliiga	26	1	2	1	28	2
MYPA	2002	Veikkausliiga	17	0	2	0	19	0
MYPA	2003	Veikkausliiga	20	1	4	0	24	1
MYPA	Total		128	8	10	3	138	11
Career total			435	61	16	3	451	63

=== International ===
As of 6 October 1996

Appearances and goals by national team and year
National team	Year	Apps	Goals
Finland	1993	10	0
Finland	1994	12	0
Finland	1995	9	1
Finland	1996	3	0
Total		34	1

Scores and results list Finland's goal tally first, score column indicates score after each Lindberg goal.

List of international goals scored by Janne Lindberg
No.	Date	Venue	Opponent	Score	Result	Competition
1.	26 April 1995	Svangaskarð, Toftir, Faroe Islands	Faroe Islands	3–0	4–0	UEFA Euro 1996 qualifying

== Honours ==
MYPA

- Veikkausliiga runner-up: 1993, 1994, 2002

Greenock Morton

- Scottish Second Division: 1994–95

1. FC Saarbrücken

- Saarland Cup: 1997–98

Individual

- Football Association of Finland: Captain's Ball 2003
