= Tommi Grönlund =

Finnish footballer (born 1969)

Personal information
- Date of birth: 9 December 1969 (age 56)
- Place of birth: Helsinki, Finland
- Height: 1.74 m (5 ft 8 1/2 in)
- Position: Midfielder

Senior career*
Years	Team	Apps	(Gls)
1989–1990	Vantaan Pallo-70	36	(4)
1991	FinnPa	20	(5)
1992–1996	HJK	119	(16)
1997	Viborg	12	(1)
1997	Ljungskile	13	(2)
1998–2001	Trelleborg	97	(6)
2001–2002	Heart of Midlothian	23	(2)
2002–2003	Helsingborg	39	(1)
2004	HJK	14	(0)

International career
1995–2002	Finland	36	(2)
- * Club domestic league appearances and goals

Tommi Grönlund (born 9 December 1969) is a retired Finnish professional football player.

== Career statistics ==
=== Club ===
Appearances and goals by club, season and competition
Club	Season	League			Cup (Note: Includes Suomen Cup, FA Cup and Norwegian Cup)		Europe		Total	
Club	Season	Division	Apps	Goals	Apps	Goals	Apps	Goals	Apps	Goals
VanPa-70	1989	Ykkönen	20	2	–		–		20	2
VanPa-70	1990	Ykkönen	16	2	–		–		16	2
VanPa-70	Total		36	4	0	0	0	0	36	4
FinnPa	1991	Veikkausliiga	20	5	–		–		20	5
HJK	1992	Veikkausliiga	24	2	–		–		24	2
HJK	1993	Veikkausliiga	23	3	–		2 (Note: Appearances in UEFA European Cup)	0	25	3
HJK	1994	Veikkausliiga	18	3	–		2 (Note: Appearances in UEFA Cup Winners' Cup)	0	20	3
HJK	1995	Veikkausliiga	26	4	–		4 (Note: Appearances in UEFA Intertoto Cup)	0	30	4
HJK	1996	Veikkausliiga	26	4	–		4 (Note: Appearances in UEFA Cup)	0	30	4
HJK	Total		117	16	0	0	12	0	129	16
Viborg	1996–97	Danish Superliga	12	1	–		–		12	1
Ljungskile	1997	Allsvenskan	13	2	–		–		13	1
Trelleborg	1998	Allsvenskan	24	0	–		–		24	0
Trelleborg	1999	Allsvenskan	24	3	–		–		24	3
Trelleborg	2000	Allsvenskan	25	1	–		–		25	1
Trelleborg	2001	Allsvenskan	25	2	–		–		25	2
Trelleborg	Total		98	6	0	0	0	0	98	6
Hearts	2001–02	Scottish Premier League	23	2	2	0	–		25	2
Helsingborg	2002	Allsvenskan	19	1	–		–		19	1
Helsingborg	2003	Allsvenskan	20	0	–		–		20	0
Helsingborg	Total		39	1	0	0	0	0	39	1
HJK	2004	Veikkausliiga	14	0	–		4 (Note: Appearances in UEFA Champions League)	0	18	0
Career total			372	37	2	0	16	0	390	37

=== International ===
Finland
Year	Apps	Goals
1995	4	0
1996	10	1
1997	1	0
1998	0	0
1999	2	0
2000	9	0
2001	8	1
2002	2	0
Total	36	2

=== International goals ===
As of match played 15 February 2001. Finland score listed first, score column indicates score after each Grönlund goal.

List of international goals scored by Tommi Grönlund
No.	Date	Venue	Opponent	Score	Result	Competition
1	30 October 1996	Kotka Staadion, Tallinn, Estonia	Estonia	1–1	2–2	Friendly
2	15 February 2001	Al-Sadaqua Walsalam Stadium, Kuwait City, Kuwait	Kuwait	2–1	3–4	Friendly

== Honours ==
HJK

- Veikkausliiga: 1992
- Finnish Cup: 1993, 1996
