= Tauriainen =

Tauriainen is a Finnish surname. Notable people with the surname include:

- Julius Tauriainen (born 2001), Finnish footballer
- Kimmo Tauriainen (1972–2025), Finnish footballer
- Mika Tauriainen (born 1975), Finnish singer
- Pasi Tauriainen (born 1964), Finnish footballer
