= Marko Rajamäki =

Finnish footballer and manager (born 1968)

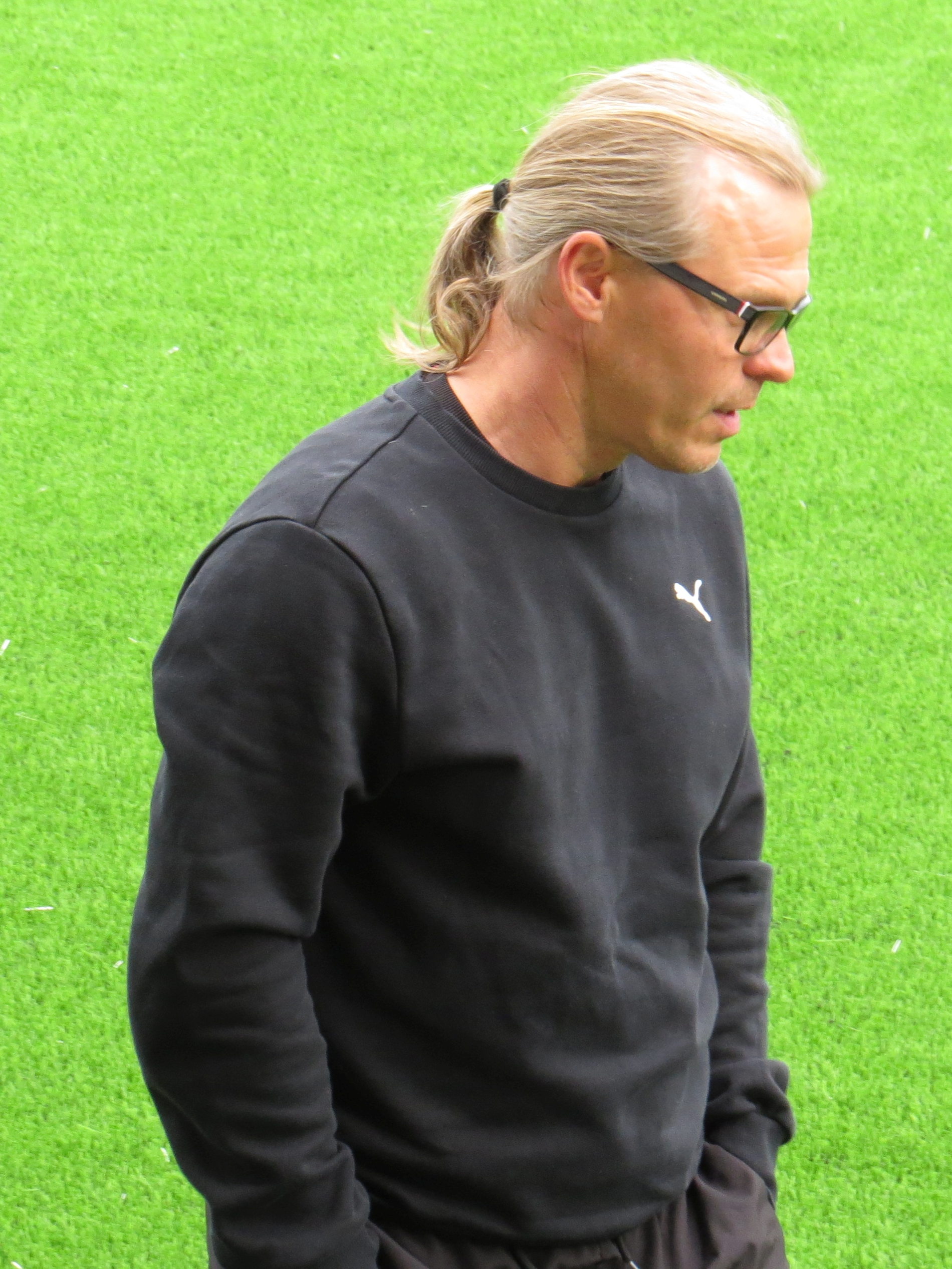
- Rajamäki in 2015.

Personal information
- Date of birth: 3 October 1968 (age 58)
- Place of birth: Gothenburg, Sweden
- Positions: Striker; midfielder

Senior career*
Years	Team	Apps	(Gls)
1986–1992	TPS Turku	166	(60)
1993–1994	MyPa	53	(26)
1994–1997	Greenock Morton	94	(29)
1997–1998	FSV Zwickau	18	(1)
1998–1999	Livingston	5	(0)
1999	→ Hamilton Academical (loan)	8	(0)
1999	Inter Turku	21	(2)
2000	TPS Turku	31	(10)
2001	SalPa	27	(12)
2002	TPS Turku	21	(17)

International career
1993–1995	Finland	16	(3)

Managerial career
- 2003–2009: TPS (youth teams/assistant)
- 2010–2014: TPS
- 2014–2016: KuPS
- 2022: TPS
- * Club domestic league appearances and goals

Marko Rajamäki (born 3 October 1968) is a Swedish-born Finnish former footballer. He managed Turun Palloseura (TPS) between 2010 and 2014. Previously he managed the club's under-18 team (since 2002) and was also the assistant manager of the senior team in 2009. Rajamäki is himself a former Finnish international footballer.

He played for several years in the Finnish league and is the league's 23rd all-time top-scorer with 98 goals.

In his time in the Scottish league, Rajamäki played for Greenock Morton (94 league games) in the 1990s. He also played for Hamilton Academical (eight league games) and Livingston (five league games).

Rajamäki made his debut for Morton, on 22 October 1994 along with fellow Finn Janne Lindberg, at Shielfield Park in a 2–1 defeat against Berwick Rangers.

He was appointed manager of TPS in September 2022 for the rest of the year, after previous manager Jonatan Johansson was sacked.

Rajamäki is currently a commentator for Veikkausliiga in Ruutu+ broadcasts. He is also coaching youth teams of TPS.

== Career statistics ==
=== Club ===
As of 26 August 2024

Appearances and goals by club, season and competition
Club	Season	League			Cup (Note: Includes DFB-Pokal)		Europe		Total	
Club	Season	Division	Apps	Goals	Apps	Goals	Apps	Goals	Apps	Goals
TPS	1986	Mestaruussarja	1	0	–		–		1	0
TPS	1987	Mestaruussarja	21	4	–		4 (Note: Includes UEFA Cup)	0	25	4
TPS	1988	Mestaruussarja	26	10	–		6	1	32	11
TPS	1989	Mestaruussarja	27	11	–		–		27	11
TPS	1990	Veikkausliiga	25	14	–		2	0	27	14
TPS	1991	Veikkausliiga	33	10	–		–		33	10
TPS	1992	Veikkausliiga	33	11	–		2 (Note: Includes UEFA Cup Winners' Cup)	0	35	11
TPS	Total		166	60	0	0	14	1	180	61
Estoril (loan)	1988–89	Segunda Divisão								
Louletano (loan)	1989–90	Segunda Divisão	4	0	–		–		4	0
MYPA	1993	Veikkausliiga	27	10	–		2	1	29	11
MYPA	1994	Veikkausliiga	26	16	–		4	1	30	17
MYPA	Total		53	26	0	0	6	2	59	28
Greenock Morton	1994–95	Scottish Second Division	25	14	–		–		25	14
Greenock Morton	1995–96	Scottish First Division	36	11	–		–		36	11
Greenock Morton	1996–97	Scottish First Division	33	4	–		–		33	4
Greenock Morton	Total		94	29	0	0	0	0	94	29
FSV Zwickau	1997–98	2. Bundesliga	19	1	1	0	–		20	1
Livingston	1998–99	Scottish Second Division	5	0	–		–		5	0
Hamilton (loan)	1998–99	Scottish First Division	8	0	–		–		8	0
Inter Turku	1999	Veikkausliiga	21	2	–		–		21	2
TPS	2000	Veikkausliiga	31	10	–		–		31	10
SalPa	2001	Ykkönen	27	12	–		–		27	12
TPS	2002	Ykkönen	21	17	–		–		21	17
Career total			451	157	1	0	20	3	472	160

=== International goals ===
#	Date	Venue	Opponent	Score	Result	Competition
1.	26 January 1993	Jawaharlal Nehru Stadium, Chennai, India	India	0–2	Won	1993 Nehru Cup
2.	31 January 1993	Jawaharlal Nehru Stadium, Chennai, India	North Korea	3–2	Lost	1993 Nehru Cup
3.	13 May 1993	Paavo Nurmi Stadium, Turku	Austria	3–1	Won	1994 World Cup qualification
Correct as of 7 October 2015

== Honours ==
- Finnish Cup 1991 (Turun Palloseura)
- Under-18 Championship 2008 (Turun Palloseura, as a manager)
- Scottish Second Division Championship 1995
- Finnish Cup: 2010 (as manager)

Individual

- Veikkausliiga Coach of the Month: August 2010, July 2012
