= Kimmo Tauriainen =

Finnish footballer (1972–2025)

Personal information
- Date of birth: 16 March 1972
- Place of birth: Rovaniemi, Finland
- Date of death: 22 January 2025 (aged 52)
- Place of death: Finland
- Height: 1.76 m (5 ft 9 in)
- Position: Midfielder

Youth career
- 1983–1989: RoPS

Senior career*
Years	Team	Apps	(Gls)
1989–1992	RoPS	21	(0)
1993–1996	Kontu	75	(11)
1996	KePS	21	(2)
1997	GBK	5	(0)
1998–2001	Atlantis	103	(16)
2002	Start	23	(4)
2003	Jokerit	22	(0)
2004–2005	MyPa	15	(3)
2006	Atlantis	24	(9)
Total		309	(45)

International career
1991	Finland U21	1	(0)
- * Club domestic league appearances and goals

Kimmo Tauriainen (16 March 1972 – 22 January 2025) was a Finnish footballer who played as a midfielder.

== Club career ==
Tauriainen played for Rovaniemen Palloseura, Kemin Palloseura, Kontu, Jokerit, MyPa and Atlantis in Finland. He also played one season for IK Start in Norwegian top tier Tippeligaen. Tauriainen won the Finnish championship title in 2005 with MyPa. He also won the Finnish Cup with Atlantis in 2001 and with MyPa in 2004.

Tauriainen returned to Atlantis from MyPa in 2006. He had to end his professional career due to knee injury after the 2006 season, in the second tier Ykkönen. During his career, Tauriainen made 88 appearances in Finnish top tier Veikkausliiga, scoring seven goals.

== International career ==
Tauriainen represented Finland at the under-21 international level. He also played two games for the Finland national futsal team.

== Personal life and death ==
Tauriainen was the brother of fellow professional footballers Pasi Tauriainen and Vesa Tauriainen, and the uncle of Jimi Tauriainen and Julius Tauriainen.

Later he worked as a sales person in Duosport. He married in summer 2009.

Tauriainen was diagnosed with lymphoma in 2023. He died on 22 January 2025, at the age of 52.

== Career statistics ==
Appearances and goals by club, season and competition
Club	Season	League			Cup (Note: Includes Suomen Cup)		Europe		Total	
Club	Season	Division	Apps	Goals	Apps	Goals	Apps	Goals	Apps	Goals
RoPS	1989	Mestaruussarja					1 (Note: Appearances in UEFA Cup)	0	1	0
RoPS	1990	Veikkausliiga								
RoPS	1991	Veikkausliiga	10	0					10	0
RoPS	1992	Veikkausliiga	10	0					10	0
RoPS	Total		21	0	0	0	1	0	21	0
Kontu	1993	Ykkönen					–			
Kontu	1994	Ykkönen					–			
Kontu	1995	Ykkönen					–			
Kontu	Total		75	11	0	0	0	0	75	11
KePS	1996	Ykkönen	21	2	–		–		21	2
GBK Kokkola	1997	Ykkönen	5	0	–		–		5	0
Atlantis	1998	Ykkönen			–		–			
Atlantis	1999	Ykkönen			–		–			
Atlantis	2000	Ykkönen			–		–			
Atlantis	2001	Veikkausliiga	31	4	1	0	–		32	4
Atlantis	Total		103	16	1	0	0	0	104	16
Start	2002	Tippeligaen	23	4	–		–		23	4
Jokerit	2003	Veikkausliiga	22	0	–		–		22	0
MYPA	2004	Veikkausliiga	0	0	1	0	–		1	0
MYPA	2005	Veikkausliiga	15	3	0	0	5	0	20	3
MYPA	Total		15	3	1	0	5	0	21	3
Atlantis	2006	Ykkönen	24	9	–		–		24	9
Career total			309	45	2	0	6	0	317	45

== Honours ==
MYPA

- Veikkausliiga: 2005
- Finnish Cup: 2004

Atlantis

- Finnish Cup: 2001
