= Mark Dziadulewicz =

English footballer

Personal information
- Full name: Mieczyslaw Dziadulewicz
- Date of birth: 29 January 1960 (age 66)
- Place of birth: Wimbledon, England
- Position: Midfielder

Youth career
- Southend United

Senior career*
Years	Team	Apps	(Gls)
1978	Southend United	0	(0)
1978–1979	Chelmsford City	19	(0)
1979	Wimbledon	2	(0)
1979	KuPS	8	(2)
1979–1980	Wimbledon	26	(1)
1981	FC Haka	25	(11)
1981–1982	Chelmsford City	4	(2)
1982	FC Haka	28	(9)
1982–1983	Chelmsford City	25	(8)
1983–1984	FC Haka	34	(13)
1984–1985	Chelmsford City	10	(1)
1985–1987	OTP	32	(7)
1987–1989	OLS	36	(19)
1989–1992	FC Ilves	54	(13)
1992	FC Tigers	6	(0)
1992	FC Oulu	22	(2)
- Canvey Island
- Saffron Walden Town
2004	Tervarit	4	(1)
2007	Tervarit	2	(0)

Managerial career
- 2007: Tervarit
- 2008–2010: Jippo
- 2015: Jippo
- 2018: SC Riverball
- * Club domestic league appearances and goals

Mieczyslaw Dziadulewicz (born 29 January 1960) is an English former footballer who played as a midfielder.

== Club career ==
Dziadulewicz began his career at Southend United, signing professional forms in 1978, after joining the club at youth level. Following his release from Southend at the end of the 1977–78 season, Dziadulewicz signed for Southern League club Chelmsford City. In February 1979, following a successful trial, Dziadulewicz signed for hometown club Wimbledon. Dziadulewicz made two Football League appearances for Wimbledon, before moving to Finland, signing for KuPS. In 1979, following two goals in eight league games for KuPS, Dzidulewicz re-signed for Wimbledon, scoring once in 26 league appearances during his time there. In 1981, Dziadulewicz signed for FC Haka. Dziadulewicz routinely switched between Haka and Chelmsford City, playing for Haka in the summer and Chelmsford in the winter, during the domestic winter break in Finland. Dziadulewicz subsequently played for Finnish clubs OTP, OLS, FC Ilves, FC Tigers and FC Oulu.

During the 1992–93 season, Dziadulewicz played for Canvey Island. Dziadulewicz later played for Saffron Walden Town in the Essex Senior League.

== Managerial career ==
In 2007, Dziadulewicz took up a player-manager role at Tervarit. In 2008, following a coaching role at AC Oulu, Dziadulewicz was appointed manager of Jippo. After leaving Jippo in 2010, Dziadulewicz took up a coaching role at JoPS. Ahead of the 2015 Kakkonen season, Dziadulewicz returned to Jippo as manager. In November 2017, SC Riverball announced the appointment of Dziadulewicz ahead of the 2018 season.
