= 1993 Ykkönen – Finnish League Division 1 =

Finnish League Division 1
- Season: 1993
- Champions: KuPS Kuopio
- Promoted: KuPS Kuopio; FC Oulu
- Relegated: PK-37 Iisalmi; TP-55 Seinäjoki

League tables for teams participating in Ykkönen, the second tier of the Finnish Soccer League system, in 1993.

== League tables ==
=== Preliminary stage ===
Pos	Team	Pld	W	D	L	GF	GA	GD	Pts
1	KuPS Kuopio	22	13	4	5	42	20	+22	43
2	KontU Helsinki	22	13	2	7	29	20	+9	41
3	KajHa Kajaani	22	12	4	6	32	25	+7	40
4	FC Oulu	22	10	8	4	31	24	+7	38
5	Kultsu Joutseno (Note: formerly JoKu Joutseno)	22	10	5	7	37	32	+5	35
6	KePS Kemi	22	10	2	10	34	38	−4	32
7	Ponnistus Helsinki	22	8	6	8	31	25	+6	30
8	VPS Vaasa	22	8	5	9	32	21	+11	29
9	KPV Kokkola	22	8	4	10	27	35	−8	28
10	P-Iirot Rauma	22	4	9	9	21	36	−15	21
11	PK-37 Iisalmi	22	3	7	12	15	29	−14	16
12	TP-55 Seinäjoki	22	1	8	13	15	41	−26	11

=== Promotion/relegation group ===
Pos	Team	Pld	W	D	L	GF	GA	GD	Pts
1	MP Mikkeli	7	4	3	0	19	7	+12	15
2	Jaro Pietarsaari	7	4	2	1	9	5	+4	14
3	KuPS Kuopio	7	3	2	2	15	10	+5	11
4	Haka Valkeakoski	7	3	1	3	13	11	+2	10
5	FC Oulu	7	3	1	3	10	10	0	10
6	Ilves Tampere	7	2	3	2	5	7	−2	9
7	KajHa Kajaani	7	2	1	4	7	12	−5	7
8	KontU Helsinki	7	0	1	6	4	20	−16	1

NB: Top six to Premier Division 1994, the rest to Division One 1994.

=== Relegation Group ===
Pos	Team	Pld	W	D	L	GF	GA	GD	Pts
1	Ponnistus Helsinki	29	13	6	10	51	36	+15	45
2	Kultsu Joutseno	29	12	8	9	51	45	+6	44
3	KPV Kokkola	29	11	6	12	41	52	−11	39
4	KePS Kemi	29	11	5	13	48	53	−5	38
5	P-Iirot Rauma	29	9	11	9	33	41	−8	38
6	VPS Vaasa	29	9	6	14	44	36	+8	33
7	PK-37 Iisalmi	29	6	8	15	27	41	−14	26
8	TP-55 Seinäjoki	29	2	10	17	23	59	−36	16

== See also ==
- Veikkausliiga (Tier 1)
