= 1992 Ykkönen – Finnish League Division 1 =

Finnish League Division 1
- Season: 1992
- Champions: TPV Tampere
- Promoted: TPV Tampere; FinnPa Helsinki
- Relegated: VanPa Vantaa; 1991 Oulu; Reipas Lahti

League table for teams participating in Ykkönen, the second tier of the Finnish Soccer League system, in 1992.

== League table ==
| Pos | Team | Pld | W | D | L | GF | GA | GD | Pts |
|---|---|---|---|---|---|---|---|---|---|
| 1 | TPV Tampere | 22 | 13 | 6 | 3 | 61 | 23 | +38 | 45 |
| 2 | FinnPa Helsinki | 22 | 12 | 6 | 4 | 45 | 19 | +26 | 42 |
| 3 | JoKu Joutseno | 22 | 12 | 6 | 4 | 35 | 18 | +17 | 42 |
| 4 | KePS Kemi | 22 | 12 | 4 | 6 | 44 | 27 | +17 | 40 |
| 5 | VPS Vaasa | 22 | 11 | 6 | 5 | 47 | 32 | +15 | 39 |
| 6 | KPV Kokkola | 22 | 11 | 2 | 9 | 42 | 31 | +11 | 35 |
| 7 | PK-37 Iisalmi | 22 | 9 | 6 | 7 | 38 | 26 | +12 | 33 |
| 8 | TP-55 Seinäjoki | 22 | 8 | 4 | 10 | 34 | 39 | −5 | 28 |
| 9 | Kumu Kuusankoski | 22 | 8 | 2 | 12 | 38 | 52 | −14 | 26 |
| 10 | VanPa Vantaa | 22 | 7 | 2 | 13 | 35 | 52 | −17 | 23 |
| 11 | 1991 Oulu (Note: formerly OLS Oulu) | 22 | 3 | 3 | 16 | 21 | 63 | −42 | 12 |
| 12 | Reipas Lahti | 22 | 2 | 1 | 19 | 22 | 80 | −58 | 7 |

Notes:

Replay for 2nd place: FinnPa Helsinki - JoKu Joutseno 3-1

Note: The three points per win system was introduced in Division One (and lower divisions) in 1992.

== Promotion/relegation playoff ==
- FC Oulu - FinnPa Helsinki 0-0
- FinnPa Helsinki - FC Oulu 1-0

FinnPa Helsinki promoted, FC Oulu (formerly OTP Oulu, who merged with OLS Oulu) relegated.

== See also ==
- Veikkausliiga (Tier 1)
