= Mark Joseph (footballer) =

Welsh footballer

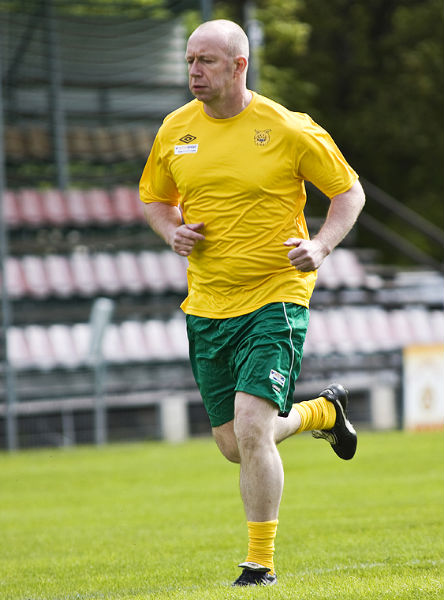
- Joseph during a charity match in 2010.

Personal information
- Date of birth: 1 February 1965 (age 61)
- Place of birth: Wrexham, Wales
- Position: Defender

Youth career
- Wrexham

Senior career*
Years	Team	Apps	(Gls)
1982—1983	Wrexham	0	(0)
1984–1985	Oswestry Town		
1985—1986	Rhyl		
1986—1991	Savon Pallo		
1992–1993	PU-62		
1992–1993	Mold Alexandra	7	(1)
1993–1996	FC Ilves	83	(2)
1997	TPV	18	(2)
1998	TP-55	25	(7)
1999	RiPS		
- * Club domestic league appearances and goals

Mark Joseph (born 1 February 1965) is a Welsh retired footballer who played most of his career in Finland.

Joseph played eight seasons in Finnish lower divisions and was signed by premier division club FC Ilves in 1993. He played four seasons and 83 caps in Veikkausliiga for FC Ilves from 1993 to 1996. Joseph ended his career in second tier clubs TPV, TP-55 and RiPS. He still lives in Finland and runs his own bar in Tampere.
