= 1991 Ykkönen – Finnish League Division 1 =

Finnish League Division 1
- Season: 1991
- Champions: MyPa Anjalankoski
- Promoted: MyPa Anjalankoski
- Relegated: P-Iirot Rauma; KontU Helsinki

League table for teams participating in Ykkönen, the second tier of the Finnish Soccer League system, in 1991.

== League table ==
Pos	Team	Pld	W	D	L	GF	GA	GD	Pts
1	MyPa Anjalankoski	20	13	2	5	42	31	+11	28
2	FinnPa Helsinki	20	11	5	4	34	23	+11	27
3	TP-55 Seinäjoki	20	12	1	7	35	31	+4	25
4	KePS Kemi	20	9	5	6	28	23	+5	23
5	Kumu Kuusankoski	20	8	6	6	40	35	+5	22
6	JoKu Joutseno	20	8	5	7	40	26	+14	21
7	PK-37 Iisalmi	20	7	6	7	25	21	+4	20
8	KPV Kokkola	20	7	4	9	31	36	−5	18
9	OLS Oulu	20	4	6	10	23	35	−12	14
10	P-Iirot Rauma	20	3	6	11	21	40	−19	12
11	KontU Helsinki	20	2	6	12	12	30	−18	10

Elo Kuopio withdrew

== Promotion/relegation playoff ==
- OTP Oulu - FinnPa Helsinki 3-2
- FinnPa Helsinki - OTP Oulu 1-3

OTP Oulu remained in Premier Division.

== See also ==
- Veikkausliiga (Tier 1)
