= Chukwu (surname) =

Disambiguation page

- Gender: Male
- Language: Igbo

Origin
- Origin: Igbo
- Meaning: "great God"
- Region of origin: Igboland

Chukwu audio is an Igbo male given name and surname. It means "the great god", derived from Igbo chi "god, spiritual being" and úkwú "great". In traditional Igbo belief Chukwu is the supreme deity and the creator of the universe. Christian Igbo people use this name to refer to the Christian God.

== Notable people bearing the name ==
- Andy Chukwu (born 1959), Nigerian movie director
- Callistus Chukwu (born 1990), Nigerian professional footballer
- Chinedu Sunday Chukwu (born 1997), Nigerian professional footballer
- Chinonye Chukwu (born 1985), Nigerian-American film director
- Christian Chukwu (1951–2025), Nigerian football player and national team coach
- Clement Chukwu (born 1973), Nigerian former athlete
- Daniel Chima Chukwu (born 1991), Nigerian professional footballer
- Hannah Chukwu (born 2003), Hungarian professional squash player
- John Chukwu (1947–1990), Nigerian comedian, actor and MC
- Lota Chukwu (born 1989), Nigerian actress
- Morice Chukwu (born 2002), Nigerian professional footballer
- Onyebuchi Chukwu (born 1962), Nigerian politician
- Peter Nworie Chukwu (1965–2026), Nigerian Roman Catholic bishop
- Raphael Chukwu (born 1975), Nigerian international footballer
- Regina Chukwu, Nigerian actress, film producer and director
- Ude Oko Chukwu (born 1962), Nigerian accountant and politician
