= Jere Aallikko =

Finnish footballer (born 1994)

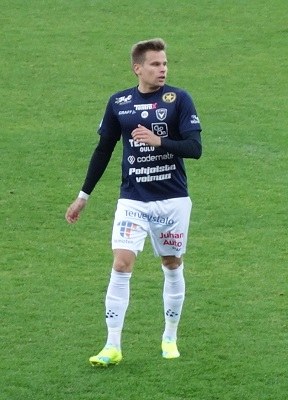
- Aallikko with AC Oulu in 2020

Personal information
- Full name: Jere Julius Aallikko
- Date of birth: 28 February 1994 (age 32)
- Place of birth: Imatra, Finland
- Height: 1.78 m (5 ft 10 in)
- Position: Midfielder

Team information
- Current team: OTP

Youth career
- Imatran Pallo-Salamat
- Imatran Palloseura

Senior career*
Years	Team	Apps	(Gls)
2010–2011	IPS	39	(10)
2012–2013	Honvéd	0	(0)
2014–2015	Levadia	7	(0)
2014–2015	Levadia II	21	(3)
2015	Notodden	6	(0)
2015	Notodden 2	19	(6)
2016	Kultsu	9	(1)
2017–2020	AC Oulu	93	(12)
2021–	OTP	38	(4)

International career
2013	Finland U19	3	(0)
2013	Finland U20	1	(0)
2015	Finland U21	2	(0)
- * Club domestic league appearances and goals as of 2 April 2025

Jere Julius Aallikko (born 28 February 1994) is a Finnish footballer who plays as a midfielder for Oulun Työväen Palloilijat. During 2014–2015, he played for Levadia Tallinn, winning the Estonian championship title in 2014.

== Honours ==
Levadia

- Meistriliiga: 2014
