= Ismaila Jagne =

Gambian footballer

Personal information
- Full name: Ismaila Jagne
- Date of birth: 1 October 1984 (age 42)
- Place of birth: Serekunda, Gambia
- Height: 1.81 m (5 ft 11 in)
- Position: Midfielder

Youth career
- 2000–2002: Anderlecht

Senior career*
Years	Team	Apps	(Gls)
2003–2005	Tervarit	24	(1)
2006–2007	Trepça	39	(5)
2007	Teuta Durrës	8	(0)
2008	Skënderbeu Korçë	9	(0)
2008	Turbina Cërrik	1	(0)
2009	Naftëtari Kuçovë		
2009–2010	Omayya SC		

International career
2002–2004	Gambia	14	(7)
- * Club domestic league appearances and goals

Ismaila Jagne (born 1 October 1984) is a Gambian international football midfielder.

== Career ==
After playing in the youth teams of R.S.C. Anderlecht he started his senior career in Finland playing with Tervarit for 3 seasons. Afterwards, he signed with KF Trepça from Kosovo in 2006, before moving to Albania where he will play for KS Teuta Durrës, Skënderbeu Korçë, KS Turbina Cërrik and KF Naftëtari Kuçovë. In the season 2009-10 he played with Omayya Idlib in Syria. since 2017 Ismaila is acting as the president of Superstars Academy FC currently playing in the Gambian League.
