= 1997 Finnish Cup =

1997 Suomen Cup
Tournament details
- Country: Finland

The 1997 Finnish Cup (Finnish: Suomen Cup) was the 43rd season of the main annual association football cup competition in Finland. It was organised as a single-elimination knock–out tournament and participation in the competition was voluntary. The final was held at the Olympic Stadium, Helsinki on 25 October 1997 with FC Haka defeating TPS by 2-1 (aet) before an attendance of 4,107 spectators.

== Early rounds ==
Not currently available.

== Round 7 ==
Tie no	Home team	Score	Away team	Information
1	Tervarit Oulu	0-4	TPS Turku	
2	GBK Kokkola	1-2	KPT-85 Kemi	
3	JJK Jyväskylä	0-2	Inter Turku	
4	RoPS Rovaniemi	3-1	MyPa Anjalankoski	

Tie no	Home team	Score	Away team	Information
5	VPS Vaasa	2-3 (aet)	FinnPa Helsinki	
6	Haka Valkeakoski	1-0	Jazz Pori	
7	TPV Tampere	0-1	PK-35 Helsinki	
8	P-Iirot Rauma	0-4	HJK Helsinki	

== Quarter-finals ==
Tie no	Home team	Score	Away team	Information
1	PK-35 Helsinki	2-3	Haka Valkeakoski	
2	KPT-85 Kemi	1-3	RoPS Rovaniemi	

Tie no	Home team	Score	Away team	Information
3	TPS Turku	1-0	FinnPa Helsinki	
4	Inter Turku	1-4	HJK Helsinki	

== Semi-finals ==
Tie no	Home team	Score	Away team	Information
1	Haka Valkeakoski	1-0	HJK Helsinki	First leg
2	RoPS Rovaniemi	0-1	TPS Turku	First leg

Tie no	Home team	Score	Away team	Information
3	HJK Helsinki	3-2	Haka Valkeakoski	Second leg
4	TPS Turku	2-0	RoPS Rovaniemi	Second leg

== Final ==
Tie no	Team 1	Score	Team 2	Information
1	Haka Valkeakoski	2-1 (aet)	TPS Turku	Att. 4,107
