= Patrice Ollo N'Doumba =

Cameroonian footballer

Patrice Ollo
Personal information
- Full name: Patrice Derigobert Ollo N'Doumba
- Date of birth: January 10, 1986 (age 40)
- Place of birth: Okola, Cameroon
- Height: 1.83 m (6 ft 0 in)
- Position: Defensive midfielder

Senior career*
Years	Team	Apps	(Gls)
2006	Tervarit	21	(3)
2006	AC Oulu	13	(1)
2007	VPS	18	(0)
2008	FC OPa	14	(3)
2008	RoPS	9	(0)
2009–2011	KuPS	49	(4)
2011	→ PK-37 (loan)	2	(0)
2014–	AC Oulu	0	(0)
- * Club domestic league appearances and goals

Patrice Derigobert Ollo N'Doumba (born January 10, 1986) is a Cameroonian football player, who has last playing for KuPS.
