= Joshewa Frederick-Charlery =

Caymanian footballer

Personal information
- Full name: Joshewa Leandro Frederick-Charlery
- Date of birth: 24 January 1997 (age 29)
- Place of birth: George Town, Cayman Islands
- Height: 1.90 m (6 ft 3 in)
- Position: Centre-back

Team information
- Current team: Lynx
- Number: 66

College career
Years	Team	Apps	(Gls)
2016–2017	Northwest Tech	9	(0)
2017	Longwood Lancers	4	(1)

Senior career*
Years	Team	Apps	(Gls)
2013–2016	Academy		
2016	Seacoast United Phantoms	8	(0)
2019–2021	Bodden Town		
2021	FC Wichita	7	(0)
2021	OTP	8	(0)
2022	Tunari	3	(1)
2024	Kajaanin Haka	17	(0)
2026–	Lynx	1	(0)

International career^{‡}
2015–	Cayman Islands	21	(0)
- * Club domestic league appearances and goals as of 21 February 2026 ‡ National team caps and goals as of 10 December 2021

Joshewa Leandro Frederick-Charlery (born 24 January 1997) is a Caymanian footballer who plays as a centre-back for Gibraltar Football League side Lynx and the Cayman Islands national team.

== College career ==
Frederick-Charley started his college career at Northwest Kansas Technical College. He made 9 appearances with the team.

He transferred to Longwood University in 2017, where he made 4 appearances, scoring one goal.

== Career statistics ==
=== Club ===
As of 10 December 2021.

Appearances and goals by club, season and competition
Club	Season	League			Cup		Other		Total	
Club	Season	Division	Apps	Goals	Apps	Goals	Apps	Goals	Apps	Goals
OTP	2021	Kakkonen	6	0	0	0	0	0	6	0
Career total			6	0	0	0	0	0	6	0

=== International ===
As of match played 20 November 2023.

National team	Year	Apps	Goals
Cayman Islands	2015	1	0
Cayman Islands	2016	0	0
Cayman Islands	2017	0	0
Cayman Islands	2018	3	0
Cayman Islands	2019	7	0
Cayman Islands	2020	0	0
Cayman Islands	2021	4	0
2022	3	0	
2023	3	0	
Total		21	0
