= Juho Mäkelä =

Finnish footballer (born 1983)

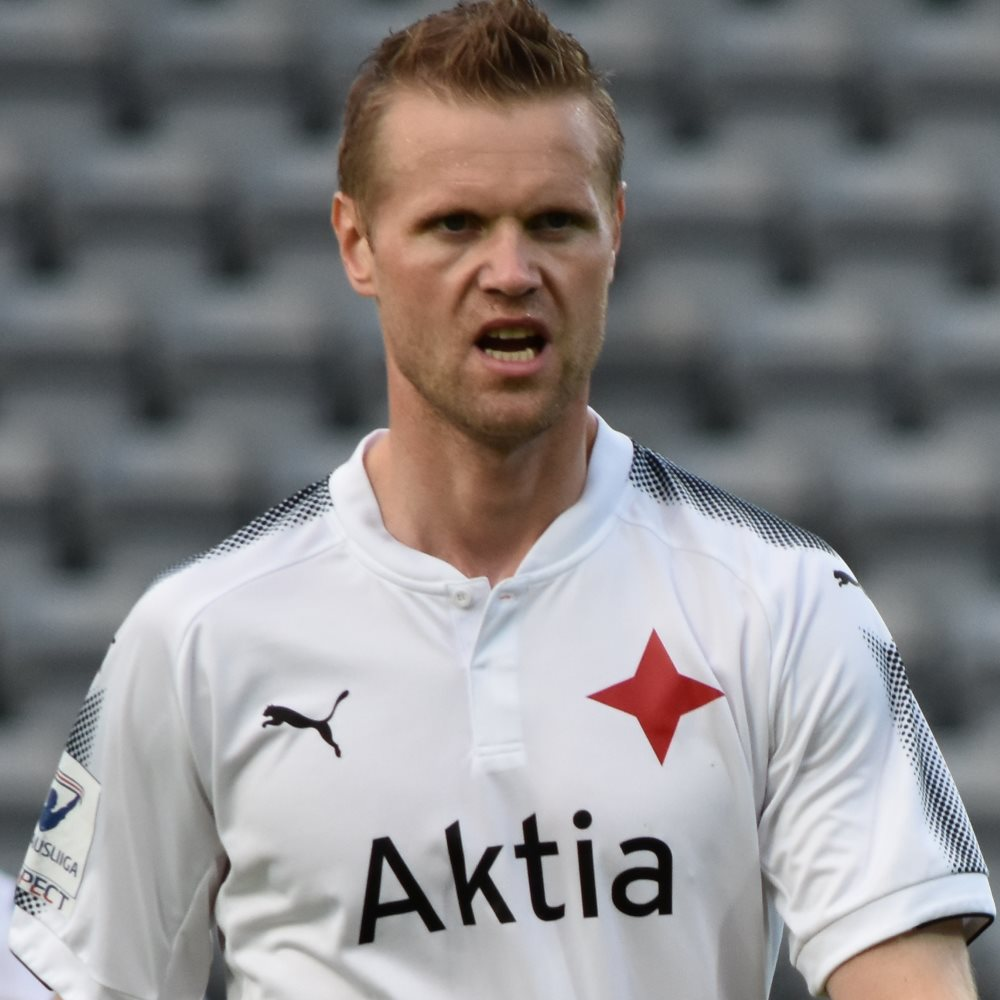

Personal information
- Date of birth: 23 June 1983 (age 43)
- Place of birth: Oulu, Finland
- Height: 1.90 m (6 ft 3 in)
- Position: Forward

Youth career
- OLS

Senior career*
| Years | Team | Apps | (Gls) |
| 2000–2002 | Tervarit | 61 | (44) |
| 2003–2005 | HJK | 66 | (33) |
| 2006–2009 | Heart of Midlothian | 20 | (2) |
| 2007 | → Thun (loan) | 14 | (3) |
| 2008 | → HJK (loan) | 13 | (7) |
| 2009–2010 | HJK | 50 | (24) |
| 2010–2012 | Sydney FC | 16 | (3) |
| 2012 | HJK | 27 | (10) |
| 2013 | SV Sandhausen | 13 | (3) |
| 2013–2014 | St. Gallen | 6 | (0) |
| 2014 | IFK Mariehamn | 4 | (0) |
| 2014 | SJK | 5 | (0) |
| 2015 | VPS | 31 | (16) |
| 2016–2018 | HIFK | 57 | (14) |
| 2018 | PS Kemi | 32 | (7) |
| 2019–2020 | AC Oulu | 39 | (12) |
| 2020 | → OLS | 1 | (1) |

International career
| 2004–2010 | Finland | 7 | (0) |
- * Club domestic league appearances and goals

Juho Mäkelä (born 23 June 1983) is a Finnish former professional footballer who played as a forward. He is especially known for his pace.

== Club career ==
=== Early career ===
Mäkelä played in the youth sector of Oulun Luistinseura (OLS) in his home-town Oulu. He started his senior career with local rival club Tervarit, before moving to Veikkausliiga club HJK Helsinki for the 2003 season. He scored 33 goals in 66 appearances for the club in three seasons, and was the Veikkausliiga top scorer in 2005. He is known as 'The Surgeon'.

=== Heart of Midlothian ===
Mäkelä signed for Heart of Midlothian on a three-and-a-half-year deal during the January 2006 transfer window, for a transfer fee of €735,000. He scored his first goal for Hearts in 4–0 win over Dunfermline on 8 April 2006. On 20 September 2006 he scored a hat-trick on his first start for Hearts in a Scottish League Cup tie against Second Division side Alloa in a 4–0 win. He scored with his head, and both his feet, scoring a treble. His fifth and final Hearts goal came on 1 October 2006 against Dundee United.

On 16 January 2007, it was reported that Mäkelä was training with German side Greuther Fürth pending a possible six-month loan move, however it was subsequently announced that he would be spending the rest of the season with FC Thun. On 28 January 2008, Juho went on trial with Dutch side RKC Waalwijk who had been relegated at the end of the 2006–07 season. On 24 April 2008, Mäkelä returned to his former club HJK Helsinki on an initial three-month loan deal.

On 22 July 2008, it was confirmed by Hearts that Mäkelä had returned from his successful loan spell with HJK Helsinki, in which he scored seven goals in 13 games, and would immediately join his teammates for pre-season training in Germany. Mäkelä's first game back was against a German regional select side in which he played the second half. He scored the sixth goal of the game with a powerful volley from eight yards in a 6–0 victory. On 2 February 2009, transfer deadline day, Hearts announced Mäkelä had been released after 23 appearances and five goals in all competitions.

=== Return to HJK Helsinki ===
Mäkelä returned to former club HJK Helsinki prior to the 2009 Veikkausliiga season. He marked his return to the club with a goal in the opening game of the season, coming off the bench in the 76th minute and scoring in the 80th minute to complete the scoring in a 5–1 win over KuPS. He also came off the bench in the second game of the season against TPS Turku, in which he set up the equalizing goal for Medo in a 2–2 draw. On 17 August 2008, he went on trial with Italian Serie B side Ascoli Calcio. He had a wonderful start for the 2010 season with HJK as he went on scoring ten goals in just eight games. After the season, he was again awarded as the league's top scorer with 16 goals.

=== Sydney FC ===
On 17 November 2010, it was announced that he would be trialling with A-League club Sydney FC. Transfer was confirmed by HJK on 7 December 2010. He joined Sydney FC for their A-league and ACL season. He will wear the number 18 shirt. He scored his first Sydney goal in his home debut after coming off the bench against Gold Coast United on 8 January 2011. Mäkelä followed this goal up with an injury-time equaliser against arch-rivals Melbourne Victory the following week with a simple tap-in. Unhappy at Sydney, due to lack of opportunity under manager Vitezslav Lavicka it was announced that club would not be renewing his contract at the end of the season, and was free to leave the club during the 2012 January transfer window if he could find another club in time. Mäkelä departed the club in April 2012.

=== Second return to HJK ===
On 5 April 2012, it was announced that Mäkelä would make his second comeback for HJK, signing a 1+1 contract with his former club. On 17 July, he scored a hat-trick, in a 7–0 home win over KR Reykjavik in the Champions League qualifiers.

=== Germany, Switzerland, and a return to Finland ===
After short spells in 2. Bundesliga with SV Sandhausen and Swiss Super League with FC St. Gallen, Mäkelä returned to Finland, signing for Åland club IFK Mariehamn on a short-term deal.

=== PS Kemi ===
Mäkelä signed with PS Kemi in March 2018, and left the club again at the end of 2018.

== International career ==
Mäkelä made his debut for the Finnish national team on 3 February 2004 against China.

== Career statistics ==
=== Club ===
Appearances and goals by club, season and competition
| Club | Season | League | | | National cup (Note: Includes Suomen Cup, Scottish Cup and Swiss Cup) | | Other | | Continental | | Total | |
| Club | Season | Division | Apps | Goals | Apps | Goals | Apps | Goals | Apps | Goals | Apps | Goals |
|---|---|---|---|---|---|---|---|---|---|---|---|---|
| Tervarit | 2000 | Ykkönen | | | | | — | | — | | | |
| Tervarit | 2001 | Ykkönen | | | | | — | | — | | | |
| Tervarit | 2002 | Ykkönen | | | | | — | | — | | | |
| Tervarit | Total | | 61 | 44 | | | — | | — | | 61 | 44 |
| HJK | 2003 | Veikkausliiga | 23 | 12 | 1 | 1 | 0 | 0 | 4 (Note: Includes UEFA Champions League) | 2 | 28 | 14 |
| HJK | 2004 | Veikkausliiga | 18 | 5 | 0 | 0 | 0 | 0 | 3 | 0 | 21 | 5 |
| HJK | 2005 | Veikkausliiga | 25 | 16 | 0 | 0 | 0 | 0 | — | | 25 | 16 |
| HJK | Total | | 66 | 33 | 1 | 1 | 0 | 0 | 4 | 2 | 71 | 36 |
| Heart of Midlothian | 2005–06 | Scottish Premier League | 2 | 1 | 1 | 0 | — | | — | | 3 | 1 |
| Heart of Midlothian | 2006–07 | Scottish Premier League | 9 | 1 | 0 | 0 | 2 (Note: Includes Scottish League Cup) | 3 | 0 | 0 | 11 | 4 |
| Heart of Midlothian | 2007–08 | Scottish Premier League | 5 | 0 | 0 | 0 | 0 | 0 | — | | 5 | 0 |
| Heart of Midlothian | 2008–09 | Scottish Premier League | 4 | 0 | 0 | 0 | 0 | 0 | — | | 4 | 0 |
| Heart of Midlothian | Total | | 20 | 2 | 1 | 0 | 2 | 3 | 0 | 0 | 23 | 5 |
| Thun (loan) | 2006–07 | Swiss Super League | 14 | 3 | — | | — | | — | | 14 | 3 |
| HJK (loan) | 2008 | Veikkausliiga | 13 | 7 | — | | — | | — | | 13 | 7 |
| HJK | 2009 | Veikkausliiga | 26 | 8 | 1 | 0 | 3 (Note: Includes Finnish League Cup) | 1 | 2 (Note: Includes UEFA Europa League) | 0 | 32 | 9 |
| HJK | 2010 | Veikkausliiga | 24 | 16 | 3 | 0 | 0 | 0 | 5 (Note: Includes UEFA Champions League and UEFA Europa League) | 0 | 32 | 16 |
| HJK | Total | | 50 | 24 | 4 | 0 | 3 | 1 | 7 | 0 | 64 | 25 |
| Sydney FC | 2010–11 | A-League | 8 | 2 | — | | — | | — | | 8 | 2 |
| Sydney FC | 2011–12 | A-League | 8 | 0 | — | | — | | — | | 8 | 0 |
| Sydney FC | Total | | 16 | 2 | 0 | 0 | 0 | 0 | 0 | 0 | 16 | 2 |
| HJK | 2012 | Veikkausliiga | 27 | 10 | 2 | 0 | 0 | 0 | 4 | 3 | 33 | 13 |
| SV Sandhausen | 2012–13 | 2. Bundesliga | 13 | 3 | — | | — | | — | | 13 | 3 |
| St. Gallen | 2013–14 | Swiss Super League | 6 | 0 | 0 | 0 | — | | — | | 6 | 0 |
| FC St. Gallen U21 | 2013–14 | Swiss Promotion League | 4 | 2 | — | | — | | — | | 4 | 2 |
| IFK Mariehamn | 2014 | Veikkausliiga | 4 | 0 | — | | — | | — | | 4 | 0 |
| SJK | 2014 | Veikkausliiga | 5 | 0 | — | | — | | — | | 5 | 0 |
| VPS | 2015 | Veikkausliiga | 31 | 16 | 1 | 1 | 1 | 0 | 1 | 0 | 34 | 17 |
| HIFK | 2016 | Veikkausliiga | 28 | 8 | 1 | 0 | 3 | 0 | — | | 32 | 8 |
| HIFK | 2017 | Veikkausliiga | 31 | 6 | 4 | 1 | — | | — | | 35 | 7 |
| HIFK | Total | | 59 | 14 | 5 | 1 | 3 | 0 | 0 | 0 | 67 | 15 |
| PS Kemi | 2018 | Veikkausliiga | 32 | 7 | 0 | 0 | — | | — | | 32 | 7 |
| AC Oulu | 2019 | Ykkönen | 26 | 11 | — | | — | | — | | 26 | 11 |
| AC Oulu | 2020 | Ykkönen | 13 | 2 | 5 | 0 | — | | — | | 18 | 2 |
| AC Oulu | Total | | 39 | 13 | 5 | 0 | 0 | 0 | 0 | 0 | 44 | 13 |
| OLS | 2020 | Kakkonen | 1 | 1 | — | | — | | — | | 1 | 1 |
| Career total | | | 371 | 181 | 19 | 3 | 9 | 4 | 19 | 5 | 418 | 193 |

=== International ===
Appearances and goals by national team and year
| National team | Year | Apps | Goals |
|---|---|---|---|
| Finland | 2004 | 2 | 0 |
| Finland | 2005 | 1 | 0 |
| Finland | 2006 | 3 | 0 |
| Finland | 2007 | 0 | 0 |
| Finland | 2008 | 1 | 0 |
| Finland | 2009 | 0 | 0 |
| Finland | 2010 | 1 | 0 |
| Total | | 8 | 0 |

== Honours ==
Individual

- Veikkausliiga Top Score: 2005, 2010
- Veikkausliiga Forward of the Year: 2010
