= Jimi Tauriainen =

Finnish footballer (born 2004)

Personal information
- Full name: Jimi Weikko Tauriainen
- Date of birth: 8 March 2004 (age 22)
- Place of birth: Helsinki, Finland
- Height: 1.88 m (6 ft 2 in)
- Positions: Midfielder; forward

Team information
- Current team: Horsens
- Number: 19

Youth career
- 2009–2016: FC Wild
- 2016–2020: HJK
- 2020–2024: Chelsea

Senior career*
Years	Team	Apps	(Gls)
2024–2026	Chelsea	1	(0)
2026–	Horsens	1	(0)

International career^{‡}
2019	Finland U15	3	(2)
2019	Finland U16	6	(4)
2022	Finland U18	2	(1)
2022	Finland U19	3	(0)
2026–	Finland U21	2	(1)
- * Club domestic league appearances and goals as of 13:18, 27 July 2026 (UTC) ‡ National team caps and goals as of 31 March 2026

Jimi Weikko Tauriainen (born 8 March 2004) is a Finnish professional footballer who plays as a midfielder or forward for Danish Superliga club Horsens.

== Club career ==
Born in Helsinki, Tauriainen began his footballing career with academy side FC Wild, a club his father had been involved in creating, at the age of five. He joined professional outfit HJK in 2016, before trialling with Italian sides Juventus and Inter Milan, as well as English side Chelsea in 2020.

In March 2020, shortly after his sixteenth birthday, HJK announced on their website that Tauriainen would join Chelsea in July of the same year, following his successful trial. Initially a forward during his time in Finland, he was converted to a midfielder at Chelsea.

He signed his first professional contract with The Blues on his 17th birthday, before extending this contract four months later, in July 2021.

On 25 February 2024, Tauriainen was named in the Chelsea first team squad in the EFL Cup final against Liverpool but remained an unused substitute. He made his senior debut three days later, coming on as a late substitute for Mykhailo Mudryk in the FA Cup fifth round match against Leeds United. On 2 May 2024, Tauriainen made his first appearance in Premier League, as a late substitute in a 2–0 home win against Tottenham Hotspur. He departed Chelsea following the conclusion of 2025–26 season.

=== AC Horsens ===
On 5 July 2026, it was announced that Tauriainen joined Danish Superliga club Horsens on a free transfer.

== International career ==
Tauriainen has represented Finland from under-15 to under-21 level.

== Personal life ==
Tauriainen hails from a football family; his father, Pasi, is a former international for Finland, while his elder brother, Julius, currently plays for Finnish side Lahti. His grandfather, Veikko and his uncles, Kimmo and Vesa, are also former footballers.

== Career statistics ==
As of match played 26 August 2025

Appearances and goals by club, season and competition
Club	Season	League			FA Cup		EFL Cup		Europe		Other		Total	
Club	Season	Division	Apps	Goals	Apps	Goals	Apps	Goals	Apps	Goals	Apps	Goals	Apps	Goals
Chelsea U21	2022–23	—			—		—		—		1 (Note: Appearance in EFL Trophy)	0	1	0
Chelsea U21	2023–24	—			—		—		—		0	0	0	0
Chelsea U21	2024–25	—			—		—		—		0	0	0	0
Chelsea U21	2025–26	—			—		—		—		1	0	1	0
Chelsea U21	Total		0	0	0	0	0	0	0	0	2	0	2	0
Chelsea	2023–24	Premier League	1	0	1	0	0	0	—		—		2	0
Career total			1	0	1	0	0	0	0	0	2	0	4	0

== Honours ==
Chelsea

- EFL Cup runner-up: 2023–24
