= Francisco Takeo =

Bolivian footballer (born 1966)

Personal information
- Full name: Luis Francisco Takeo Justiniano
- Date of birth: 3 May 1966 (age 60)
- Place of birth: Santa Cruz de la Sierra, Bolivia
- Position: Midfielder

International career
Years	Team	Apps	(Gls)
1989–1993	Bolivia	11	(1)

Francisco Takeo (born 13 May 1966) is a Bolivian footballer. He played in eleven matches for the Bolivia national football team from 1989 to 1993. He was also part of Bolivia's squad for the 1989 Copa América tournament.
