= Aqueel Ansari =

Indian footballer

Personal information
- Full name: Aqueel Ansari
- Date of birth: 2 June 1972 (age 54)
- Position: Midfielder

Senior career*
Years	Team	Apps	(Gls)
- East Bengal
- Mohammadens SportingEast Bengal
- Bengal Mumbai FC

International career
- India
- * Club domestic league appearances and goals

Aqueel Ansari (born 2 June 1972) is a former Indian International football player who played as a midfielder. He has played for India in few matches including the Nehru Cup in 1993 and 1997. At the club level, Ansari had played for clubs like Mohammaden Sporting and Bengal Mumbai FC.

== Honours ==
India

- SAFF Championship: 1993; runner-up: 1995
- South Asian Games Gold medal: 1995

Maharashtra

- Santosh Trophy: 1999–2000
