= Julius Tauriainen =

Finnish footballer (born 2001)

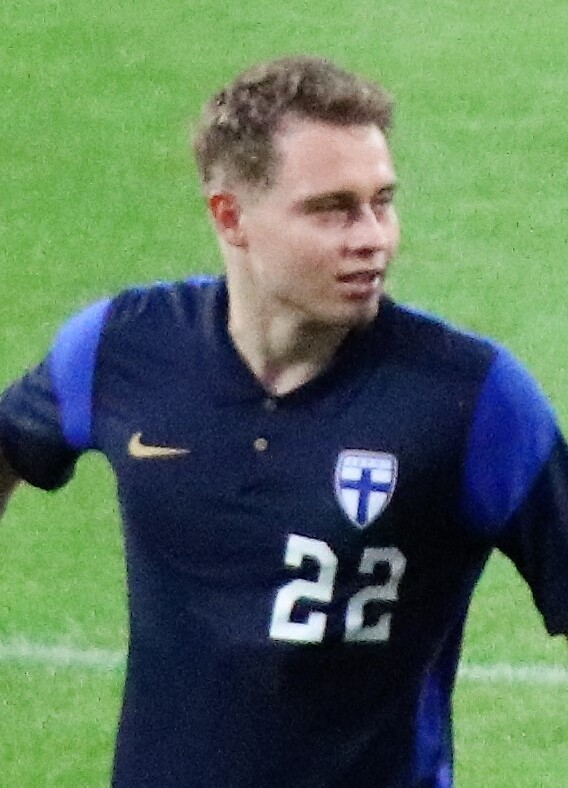
- Tauriainen with Finland U21 in 2022

Personal information
- Full name: Julius Mikael Tauriainen
- Date of birth: 18 April 2001 (age 25)
- Place of birth: Helsinki, Finland
- Height: 1.75 m (5 ft 9 in)
- Position: Right-back

Team information
- Current team: Inter Turku
- Number: 24

Youth career
- –2015: FC Wild
- 2016–2018: HJK

Senior career*
| Years | Team | Apps | (Gls) |
| 2018–2019 | Klubi 04 | 38 | (9) |
| 2019–2020 | HJK | 0 | (0) |
| 2019–2020 | → SC Freiburg (loan) | 0 | (0) |
| 2020–2022 | SC Freiburg II | 39 | (2) |
| 2022 | Miedź Legnica II | 5 | (0) |
| 2023–2024 | Lahti | 36 | (2) |
| 2025– | Inter Turku | 22 | (1) |
| 2025– | Inter Turku II | 4 | (0) |

International career
| 2016–2017 | Finland U16 | 5 | (0) |
| 2017–2018 | Finland U17 | 6 | (0) |
| 2019 | Finland U18 | 4 | (1) |
| 2019 | Finland U19 | 5 | (0) |
| 2021–2022 | Finland U21 | 10 | (1) |
- * Club domestic league appearances and goals as of 12 November 2026

Julius Mikael Tauriainen (born 18 April 2001) is a Finnish professional footballer who plays as a right-back for Veikkausliiga club Inter Turku.

== Early life ==
Tauriainen grew up in Veikkola, Kirkkonummi and started playing football in the local club FC WILD, before joining the HJK organisation.

== Club career ==
=== Klubi 04 ===
On 18 February 2018, it was reported that Tauriainen signed a contract with HJK.

=== SC Freiburg II ===
Following a successful loan stint with SC Freiburg U19 team, it was announced on 2 July 2020 that HJK had accepted an offer from SC Freiburg for a permanent transfer of Tauriainen, for an undisclosed fee. He was registered to the club's reserve team SC Freiburg II in Regionalliga. After the season, the club gained promotion to 3. Liga.

=== Miedź Legnica II ===
Miedź Legnica announced on 15 September 2022 that Tauriainen had joined the club and that he would represent Miedź Legnica II. He departed the club after a few months.

=== FC Lahti ===
On 6 February 2023, Tauriainen returned to Finland and signed with Veikkausliiga side FC Lahti on a two-year deal. On 24 July 2024, it was announced that Tauriainen is sidelined for indefinite period of time due to surgery-requiring knee injury.

== International career ==
He has represented Finland at international youth levels and was in the starting eleven in 8 out of 10 2023 UEFA European Under-21 Championship qualification matches.

== Personal life ==
Tauriainen hails from a football family; his father, Pasi, is a former international for Finland. His grandfather, Veikko and his uncles, Kimmo and Vesa, are also former footballers. While his younger brother Jimi plays for AC Horsens in Denmark.

== Career statistics ==
As of 12 November 2026

Appearances and goals by club, season and competition
| Club | Season | League | | | Cup (Note: Includes Suomen Cup) | | Continental | | Other (Note: Includes Finnish League Cup) | | Total | |
| Club | Season | Division | Apps | Goals | Apps | Goals | Apps | Goals | Apps | Goals | Apps | Goals |
|---|---|---|---|---|---|---|---|---|---|---|---|---|
| Klubi 04 | 2018 | Ykkönen | 26 | 2 | 3 | 0 | – | | – | | 29 | 2 |
| Klubi 04 | 2019 | Kakkonen | 12 | 7 | – | | – | | – | | 12 | 7 |
| Klubi 04 | Total | | 38 | 9 | 3 | 0 | 0 | 0 | 0 | 0 | 41 | 9 |
| HJK | 2019 | Veikkausliiga | 0 | 0 | 2 | 0 | 0 | 0 | – | | 2 | 0 |
| SC Freiburg II | 2020–21 | Regionalliga Südwest | 11 | 1 | – | | – | | – | | 11 | 1 |
| SC Freiburg II | 2021–22 | 3. Liga | 28 | 1 | – | | – | | – | | 28 | 1 |
| SC Freiburg II | Total | | 39 | 2 | 0 | 0 | 0 | 0 | 0 | 0 | 39 | 1 |
| Miedź Legnica II | 2022–23 | III liga | 5 | 0 | – | | – | | – | | 5 | 0 |
| Lahti | 2023 | Veikkausliiga | 21 | 1 | 1 | 0 | – | | 2 (Note: Appearances in the Finnish League Cup) | 0 | 24 | 1 |
| Lahti | 2024 | Veikkausliiga | 15 | 1 | 2 | 1 | – | | 4 | 0 | 21 | 3 |
| Lahti | Total | | 36 | 2 | 3 | 1 | 0 | 0 | 6 | 0 | 44 | 3 |
| Inter Turku | 2025 | Veikkausliiga | 4 | 0 | – | | – | | – | | 0 | 0 |
| Inter Turku | 2026 | Veikkausliiga | 18 | 1 | 5 | 3 | 4 (Note: Appearances in UEFA Conference League) | 0 | 6 | 0 | 0 | 0 |
| Inter Turku | Total | | 22 | 1 | 5 | 3 | 4 | 0 | 6 | 0 | 37 | 4 |
| Career total | | | 140 | 15 | 13 | 4 | 4 | 0 | 12 | 0 | 169 | 18 |

== Honours ==
SC Freiburg II

- Regionalliga Südwest: 2020–21
