= 1989 Ykkönen – Finnish League Division 1 =

Finnish League Division 1
- Season: 1989
- Champions: KPV Kokkola
- Promoted: KPV Kokkola; Kumu Kuusankoski
- Relegated: TuTo Turku; VaKP Valkeakoski; TuPa Turku

League table for teams participating in Ykkönen, the second tier of the Finnish Soccer League system, in 1989.

== League table ==
| Pos | Team | Pld | W | D | L | GF | GA | GD | Pts |
|---|---|---|---|---|---|---|---|---|---|
| 1 | KPV Kokkola | 22 | 13 | 7 | 2 | 43 | 18 | +25 | 33 |
| 2 | Kumu Kuusankoski (Note: formerly KumuP Kuusankoski) | 22 | 12 | 5 | 5 | 49 | 28 | +21 | 29 |
| 3 | Koparit Kuopio | 22 | 12 | 5 | 5 | 47 | 27 | +20 | 29 |
| 4 | PPT Pori | 22 | 11 | 7 | 4 | 42 | 31 | +11 | 29 |
| 5 | MyPa Anjalankoski | 22 | 9 | 7 | 6 | 43 | 31 | +12 | 25 |
| 6 | PK-37 Iisalmi | 22 | 9 | 5 | 8 | 37 | 29 | +8 | 23 |
| 7 | Elo Kuopio | 22 | 8 | 7 | 7 | 29 | 32 | −3 | 23 |
| 8 | VanPa Vantaa | 22 | 6 | 6 | 10 | 29 | 43 | −14 | 18 |
| 9 | KontU Helsinki | 22 | 5 | 7 | 10 | 22 | 31 | −9 | 17 |
| 10 | TuTo Turku | 22 | 6 | 3 | 13 | 17 | 41 | −24 | 15 |
| 11 | VaKP Valkeakoski | 22 | 4 | 4 | 14 | 26 | 50 | −24 | 12 |
| 12 | TuPa Turku | 22 | 2 | 7 | 13 | 25 | 48 | −23 | 11 |

Notes:

Replay for 2nd place: Kumu Kuusankoski - Koparit Kuopio 4-2

== Premier Division/Division One 1989, promotion/relegation playoff ==
- Kumu Kuusankoski - KePS Kemi 2-0
- KePS Kemi - Kumu Kuusankoski 1-0

Kumu Kuusankoski promoted, KePS Kemi relegated.

== See also ==
- Mestaruussarja (Tier 1)
