= Choi Yong-son =

North Korean footballer (born 1972)

Personal information
- Date of birth: 10 October 1972 (age 54)
- Height: 1.80 m (5 ft 11 in)
- Position: Forward

Youth career
- Pyongyang Athletics College

Senior career*
Years	Team	Apps	(Gls)
- Pyongyang

International career
1991	Korea U20	4	(0)
1990–1993	North Korea	29	(10)
- * Club domestic league appearances and goals

- Choi Yong-son
- Hangul: 최영선
- RR: Choe Yeongseon
- MR: Ch'oe Yŏngsŏn

Choi Yong-son (Korean: 최영선; born 10 October 1972) is a North Korean former footballer. He represented North Korea on at least twenty-nine occasions between 1990 and 1993, scoring ten goals. He also represented the unified Korean team at the 1991 FIFA World Youth Championship.

== Career statistics ==
=== International ===
National team	Year	Apps	Goals
North Korea	1990	7	0
North Korea	1991	1	1
North Korea	1992	6	1
North Korea	1993	15	8
Total		29	10

=== International goals ===
Scores and results list North Korea's goal tally first, score column indicates score after each North Korea goal.

List of international goals scored by Choi
No.	Date	Venue	Opponent	Score	Result	Competition
1	19 October 1991	RFK Stadium, Washington, United States	United States	2–1	2–1	Friendly
2	24 August 1992	Workers' Stadium, Beijing, China	South Korea	1–1	1–1	Friendly
3	19 January 1993	Jawaharlal Nehru Stadium, Chennai, India	Bolivia	?–?	2–1	Friendly
4	31 January 1993	Jawaharlal Nehru Stadium, Chennai, India	Finland	1–0	3–2	Friendly
5	31 January 1993	Jawaharlal Nehru Stadium, Chennai, India	Finland	2–0	3–2	Friendly
6	9 April 1993	Khalifa International Stadium, Doha, Qatar	Vietnam	2–0	3–0	1994 FIFA World Cup qualification
7	13 April 1993	Khalifa International Stadium, Doha, Qatar	Indonesia	2–0	4–0	1994 FIFA World Cup qualification
8	13 April 1993	Khalifa International Stadium, Doha, Qatar	Indonesia	3–0	4–0	1994 FIFA World Cup qualification
9	26 April 1993	National Stadium, Kallang, Singapore	Singapore	2–0	3–1	1994 FIFA World Cup qualification
10	26 April 1993	National Stadium, Kallang, Singapore	Singapore	3–1	3–1	1994 FIFA World Cup qualification
