= Vitali Nikulkin =

Russian footballer

Personal information
- Full name: Vitali Viktorovich Nikulkin
- Date of birth: 31 July 1971 (age 55)
- Place of birth: Saransk, Russian SFSR
- Height: 1.82 m (5 ft 11 1/2 in)
- Positions: Striker; midfielder

Youth career
- FC Svetotekhnika Saransk

Senior career*
Years	Team	Apps	(Gls)
1987–1989	FC Fakel Saransk		
1989–1991	FC Svetotekhnika Saransk	104	(40)
1992–1994	FC Lokomotiv Moscow	32	(2)
1992–1993	→ FC Lokomotiv-d Moscow	2	(0)
1994–1995	FC Lokomotiv Nizhny Novgorod	21	(2)
1995–1996	FC Orbita Saransk		
1996–2003	FC Mordovia Saransk	220	(56)
2005–2007	FC Mordovia Saransk	77	(14)

Managerial career
- 2009: FC Mordovia Saransk (scout)
- 2010: FC Mordovia Saransk (assistant)
- * Club domestic league appearances and goals

Vitali Viktorovich Nikulkin (Russian: Виталий Викторович Никулкин; born 31 July 1971) is a former Russian professional footballer.

== Club career ==
He made his professional debut in the Soviet Second League in 1989 for FC Svetotekhnika Saransk. He played 1 game in the UEFA Cup 1993–94 for FC Lokomotiv Moscow.

== Honours ==
- Russian Premier League bronze: 1994.
- Most league goals in FC Mordovia Saransk history: 110.
