= Cristian Albeanu =

Romanian footballer

Personal information
- Date of birth: 5 October 1971 (age 55)
- Place of birth: Târgu Cărbunești, Romania
- Height: 1.86 m (6 ft 1 in)
- Positions: Striker; second striker

Youth career
- 1988–1989: CSȘ Craiova

Senior career*
Years	Team	Apps	(Gls)
1991	Metalurgistul Slatina		
1992–1995	Electroputere Craiova	103	(29)
1995–1998	Național București	68	(16)
1996	→ Gloria Bistrița (loan)	6	(3)
1998–1999	Bihor Oradea	27	(10)
2000	Electro Bere Craiova	11	(3)
2000	Argeș Pitești	10	(2)
2001–2003	Jiul Petroșani (Note: The statistics for the 2002–03 Divizia C season are unavailable.)	21	(3)
Total		246	(66)

International career
1992–1993	Romania U21	3	(2)
- * Club domestic league appearances and goals

Cristian Albeanu (born 5 October 1971) is a Romanian former footballer who played as a striker and second striker.

== Conviction ==
On 25 September 1996, Albeanu was involved in a road accident while driving his car on the Bucharest – Ploiești road and hit one man who was regularly walking on the crosswalk. The man died and Albeanu received a two-year suspended sentence.

== Honours ==
Național București

- Cupa României runner-up: 1996–97

Jiul Petroșani

- Divizia C: 2002–03
