= 1990 Ykkönen – Finnish League Division 1 =

Finnish League Division 1
- Season: 1990
- Champions: PPT Pori
- Promoted: PPT Pori; Jaro Pietarsaari
- Relegated: VanPa Vantaa; Koparit Kuopio; GrIFK Kauniainen

League table for teams participating in Ykkönen, the second tier of the Finnish Soccer League system, in 1990.

== League table ==
Pos	Team	Pld	W	D	L	GF	GA	GD	Pts
1	PPT Pori	22	12	8	2	52	19	+33	32
2	Jaro Pietarsaari	22	12	6	4	43	19	+24	30
3	PK-37 Iisalmi	22	10	7	5	37	27	+10	27
4	MyPa Anjalankoski	22	9	5	8	36	32	+4	23
5	Elo Kuopio	22	8	7	7	36	32	+4	23
6	TP-55 Seinäjoki	22	8	7	7	30	27	+3	23
7	KontU Helsinki	22	8	7	7	30	33	−3	23
8	KePS Kemi	22	7	7	8	20	31	−11	21
9	JoKu Joutseno	22	7	5	10	28	32	−4	19
10	VanPa Vantaa	22	4	8	10	21	44	−23	16
11	Koparit Kuopio	22	5	5	12	29	41	−12	15
12	GrIFK Kauniainen	22	5	2	15	26	51	−25	12

== Promotion/relegation playoff ==
- KPV Kokkola - Jaro Pietarsaari 0–1
- Jaro Pietarsaari - KPV Kokkola 4–2

Jaro Pietarsaari promoted, KPV Kokkola relegated.

== See also ==
- Veikkausliiga (Tier 1)
