= Callistus Chukwu =

Nigerian footballer (born 1990)

Chukwu Callistus
Personal information
- Date of birth: 14 November 1990 (age 35)
- Place of birth: Ayumgba, Nigeria
- Height: 1.70 m (5 ft 7 in)
- Position: Midfielder

Team information
- Current team: OPS

Youth career
- Emmanuel Amunike Soccer Academy

Senior career*
Years	Team	Apps	(Gls)
2012–2015	AC Kajaani	112	(22)
2016–2017	JS Hercules	12	(2)
2017	OPS	12	(1)
2018–2019	Kraft	9	(2)
2019–2020	KajHa	10	(5)
2021–	OTP	21	(8)
- * Club domestic league appearances and goals as of 08:17, 9 November 2021 (UTC)

Callistus Chukwu (born 14 November 1990) is a Nigerian professional footballer who plays as a midfielder for a Finnish club AC Kajaani. He began his career at Emmanuel Amunike Soccer Academy.
