= 1997 Veikkausliiga =

Veikkausliiga
- Season: 1997

Statistics of Veikkausliiga in the 1997 season.

== Overview ==
It was contested by 10 teams, and HJK Helsinki won the championship.

== League standings ==
| Pos | Team | Pld | W | D | L | GF | GA | GD | Pts | Qualification or relegation |
|---|---|---|---|---|---|---|---|---|---|---|
| 1 | HJK (C) | 27 | 18 | 4 | 5 | 53 | 18 | +35 | 58 | Qualification to Champions League first qualifying round |
| 2 | VPS | 27 | 13 | 9 | 5 | 40 | 20 | +20 | 48 | Qualification to UEFA Cup first qualifying round |
| 3 | FinnPa | 27 | 10 | 9 | 8 | 27 | 36 | −9 | 39 | Qualification to UEFA Cup first qualifying round |
| 4 | TPS | 27 | 10 | 8 | 9 | 43 | 41 | +2 | 38 | Qualification to Intertoto Cup first round |
| 5 | MyPa | 27 | 8 | 13 | 6 | 31 | 23 | +8 | 37 | |
| 6 | RoPS | 27 | 9 | 6 | 12 | 31 | 30 | +1 | 33 | |
| 7 | Jazz | 27 | 8 | 7 | 12 | 31 | 42 | −11 | 31 | |
| 8 | FF Jaro | 27 | 8 | 4 | 15 | 33 | 48 | −15 | 28 | |
| 9 | TP-Seinäjoki (R) | 27 | 5 | 12 | 10 | 22 | 34 | −12 | 27 | Qualification to relegation play-offs |
| 10 | Inter Turku (R) | 27 | 6 | 8 | 13 | 23 | 42 | −19 | 26 | Relegation to Ykkönen |

Source: rsssf.com
(C) Champions; (R) Relegated

Haka Valkeakoski as winners of the 1997 Finnish Cup from the lower division qualified for the qualifying round of the 1998–99 Cup Winners' Cup.

== Results ==
=== Matches 1–18 ===
| Home \ Away | FPA | HJK | INT | JAR | JAZ | MYP | RPS | TSE | TPS | VPS |
|---|---|---|---|---|---|---|---|---|---|---|
| FinnPa | | 0–2 | 1–1 | 3–1 | 2–1 | 0–1 | 1–3 | 1–0 | 3–3 | 0–4 |
| HJK Helsinki | 3–0 | | 1–0 | 3–2 | 3–2 | 2–1 | 3–1 | 6–1 | 1–2 | 1–1 |
| Inter Turku | 0–1 | 0–1 | | 2–0 | 1–1 | 1–1 | 3–2 | 2–2 | 0–3 | 1–3 |
| Jaro | 1–1 | 2–1 | 1–1 | | 2–3 | 1–5 | 0–3 | 2–1 | 3–1 | 3–0 |
| Jazz | 1–1 | 1–0 | 5–2 | 2–1 | | 0–0 | 1–1 | 1–0 | 4–2 | 1–1 |
| MyPa | 1–2 | 1–0 | 0–0 | 2–1 | 1–1 | | 0–1 | 3–0 | 2–2 | 1–1 |
| RoPS | 0–0 | 0–1 | 0–1 | 0–1 | 0–1 | 0–0 | | 1–2 | 4–2 | 2–2 |
| TP-Seinäjoki | 0–0 | 1–1 | 1–1 | 1–1 | 1–0 | 0–0 | 0–1 | | 0–1 | 0–0 |
| TPS | 7–0 | 0–2 | 0–1 | 1–3 | 2–1 | 0–0 | 2–0 | 1–1 | | 0–3 |
| VPS | 0–1 | 0–0 | 0–1 | 1–0 | 3–1 | 0–0 | 1–0 | 1–1 | 2–0 | |

Legend: Blue = home team win; Yellow = draw; Red = away team win.

=== Matches 19–27 ===
| Home \ Away | FPA | HJK | INT | JAR | JAZ | MYP | RPS | TSE | TPS | VPS |
|---|---|---|---|---|---|---|---|---|---|---|
| FinnPa | | 1–0 | 2–2 | | 3–0 | 2–0 | | 1–0 | | |
| HJK Helsinki | | | | 4–1 | | 3–0 | 0–0 | | 5–0 | 3–1 |
| Inter Turku | | 0–4 | | | 0–1 | | | 0–2 | 0–2 | |
| Jaro | 3–0 | | 0–2 | | | | 0–2 | | | 0–2 |
| Jazz | | 0–2 | | 0–2 | | 1–1 | | 0–2 | 1–3 | |
| MyPa | | | 3–0 | 3–1 | | | 3–1 | | 0–0 | 0–1 |
| RoPS | 1–0 | | 1–0 | | 5–1 | | | 0–1 | | |
| TP-Seinäjoki | | 0–1 | | 1–1 | | 2–2 | | | 2–2 | |
| TPS | 1–1 | | | 3–0 | | | 1–1 | | | 2–1 |
| VPS | 0–0 | | 4–1 | | 1–0 | | 3–1 | 4–0 | | |

Legend: Blue = home team win; Yellow = draw; Red = away team win.

== Attendances ==
| No. | Club | Average |
|---|---|---|
| 1 | VPS | 3,893 |
| 2 | HJK | 3,112 |
| 3 | Jazz | 2,226 |
| 4 | FinnPa | 1,856 |
| 5 | Seinäjoki | 1,852 |
| 6 | MyPa | 1,762 |
| 7 | TPS | 1,646 |
| 8 | Inter Turku | 1,560 |
| 9 | Jaro | 1,387 |
| 10 | RoPS | 1,156 |

== See also ==
- Suomen Cup 1997
