= Pasi Tauriainen =

Finnish footballer (born 1964)

Personal information
- Date of birth: 4 October 1964 (age 62)
- Place of birth: Rovaniemi, Finland
- Height: 1.82 m (6 ft 0 in)
- Position: Midfielder

Youth career
- 1975–1982: RoRe

Senior career*
Years	Team	Apps	(Gls)
1982–1983	RoRe		(36)
1984–1989	RoPs	109	(31)
1987	→ K. Berchem Sport (loan)	10	(1)
1990–1995	HJK	121	(22)
1996	Ekenäs IF	5	(2)
Total		245+	(92)

International career
1984	Finland U21	9	(0)
1986–1993	Finland	33	(2)
- * Club domestic league appearances and goals

Pasi Tauriainen (born 4 October 1964) is a Finnish former professional footballer who played as a midfielder. He is the father of Finnish midfielder Jimi Tauriainen and Julius Tauriainen.

== Career statistics ==
=== Club ===
Appearances and goals by club, season and competition
Club	Season	League			Cup		Continental		Other		Total	
Club	Season	Division	Apps	Goals	Apps	Goals	Apps	Goals	Apps	Goals	Apps	Goals
RoPS	1984	Mestaruussarja	22	2	0	0	0	0	0	0	2	0
RoPS	1985	Mestaruussarja	22	4	0	0	0	0	0	0	2	0
RoPS	1986	Mestaruussarja	22	11	1 (Note: Appearances in the Suomen Cup)	0	0	0	0	0	23	11
RoPS	1987	Mestaruussarja	15	5	0	0	4 (Note: Appearances in the 1987–88 European Cup Winners' Cup)	0	0	0	19	5
RoPS	1988	Mestaruussarja	6	1	0	0	2	0	0	0	8	1
RoPS	1989	Mestaruussarja	22	8	0	0	4 (Note: Appearances in the 1989–90 UEFA Cup)	0	0	0	2	0
RoPS	Total		109	31	1	0	10	0	0	0	120	31
K. Berchem Sport (loan)	1987–88	Belgian Second Division	10	1	0	0	–		0	0	10	1
HJK	1990	Veikkausliiga	26	3	0	0	0	0	0	0	26	3
HJK	1991	Veikkausliiga	28	4	0	0	2 (Note: Appearances in 1991–92 European Cup qualifying)	0	0	0	30	4
HJK	1992	Veikkausliiga	27	9	0	0	0	0	0	0	27	9
HJK	1993	Veikkausliiga	6	2	0	0	2 (Note: Appearances in 1993–94 UEFA Champions League qualifying)	0	0	0	8	2
HJK	1994	Veikkausliiga	24	4	0	0	2 (Note: One appearance in 1994–95 UEFA Champions League qualifying, two appearances in the competition proper)	0	0	0	26	4
HJK	1995	Veikkausliiga	10	0	0	0	3 (Note: Appearances in the 1995 UEFA Intertoto Cup)	0	0	0	13	0
HJK	Total		121	22	0	0	9	0	0	0	130	22
Ekenäs IF	1996	Kakkonen	5	2	0	0	–		0	0	5	2
Career total			245	56	1	0	19	0	0	0	265	56

=== International ===
Appearances and goals by national team and year
National team	Year	Apps	Goals
Finland	1986	5	0
Finland	1987	2	0
Finland	1988	3	0
Finland	1989	2	0
Finland	1990	8	1 (Note: Tauriainen was reported to have also scored against Malta during qualifying for UEFA Euro 1992. However, UEFA has the goalscorer listed as Erik Holmgren.)
Finland	1991	3	0
Finland	1992	5	0
Finland	1993	5	1
Total		33	1

=== International goals ===
Scores and results list Finland's goal tally first, score column indicates score after each Finland goal.

List of international goals scored by Tauriainen
No.	Date	Venue	Opponent	Score	Result	Competition
1	16 May 1990	Lansdowne Road, Dublin, Republic of Ireland	Republic of Ireland	1–0	1–1	Friendly
2	26 January 1993	Jawaharlal Nehru Stadium, Chennai, India	India	1–0	2–0	Friendly
