= Tervarit =

Finnish football club

- Founded: 1994
- Ground: Heinäpää Sports Centre, Oulu
- Manager: Tapio Haapaniemi
- League: Kolmonen (Northern zone)
Home colours	Away colours

Tervarit is a football and futsal club based in Oulu, Finland. It plays currently in the Finnish fourth tier Kolmonen.

== Notable former players ==
- (England) Mark Dziadulewicz
- (Nigeria) Raphael Edereho
- (Finland) Otto Fredrikson
- (The Gambia) Ismaila Jagne
- (Finland) Jani Kauppila
- (Finland) Juho Mäkelä
- (Cameroon) Patrice Ollo
- (Trinidad and Tobago) Brent Sancho
- (Albania) (Finland) Dritan Stafsula
- (Liberia) Josephus Yenay
