= Oulun Työväen Palloilijat =

Association football club in Finland

OTP
- Full name: Oulun Työväen Palloilijat
- Founded: 1946
- Ground: Heinäpää Sports Centre
- Manager: Tero Suonperä
- League: Kakkonen
Home colours	Away colours

Oulun Työväen Palloilijat, (OTP for short), is a football club from Oulu, Finland.

OTP has played 16 seasons in the Finnish premier divisions Mestaruussarja and Veikkausliiga. After that there was a short lived merger with OLS called FC Oulu in the early 1990s. OTP was re-established in 1995 as FC Oulu defunct.

The club has also been playing bandy, winning the bandy championship of the Finnish Workers' Sports Federation in 1953, 1954, and 1955.

== Current roster ==
The team's roster contains the following full internationals.

Note: Flags indicate national team as defined under FIFA eligibility rules; some limited exceptions apply. Players may hold more than one non-FIFA nationality.

No.	Pos.	Nation	Player
1	GK	FIN	Tommi Lindholm
10	FW	SLV	Ronald Arévalo
4	DF	CAY	Joshewa Frederick-Charlery
12	GK	FIN	Valtteri Tikkanen
4	DF	CAY	Joshewa Frederick-Charlery
9	DF	FIN	Konstantin Belov
13	DF	FIN	Paulo Ippolito
24	DF	NGA	Alexander Jibrin
32	DF	FIN	Santeri Ukkola
5	MF	FIN	Niko Isola
8	MF	FIN	Jere Aallikko
14	MF	FIN	Rober David
15	MF	FIN	Simon Thurling
17	MF	FIN	Jeremias Loukusa

No.	Pos.	Nation	Player
20	MF	FIN	Roni Savolainen
23	MF	PUR	Alex Oikkonen
72	MF	POR	Tomás Maldonado
7	FW	FIN	Jyri Vääräniemi
10	FW	NGA	Callistus Chukwu
11	FW	FIN	Neil Livingstone
22	FW	NGA	Kingsley Izekor
30	FW	ARG	Juan Ignacio Falcon
35	FW	NIG	Michael Ibiyomi
50	FW	CMR	Titi Essomba

== Honours ==
- Winners of TUL Cup: 1980, 1986, 1989, 1991

=== Season to season ===
Season to Season

Season	Level	Division	Section	Administration	Position	Movements
1953	Tier 3	Suomensarjan karsinnat (Third Division)	West Group	Finnish FA (Suomen Pallolitto)	3rd	
1954	Tier 3	Maakuntasarja (Third Division)	North Group II	Finnish FA (Suomen Pallolitto)	1st	Promotion West Group 2nd - Promoted
1955	Tier 2	'Suomensarja (Second Division)	West Group	Finnish FA (Suomen Palloliitto)	9th	Relegated
1956	Tier 3	Maakuntasarja (Third Division)	North Group I	Finnish FA (Suomen Pallolitto)	1st	Promotion Playoff - Promoted
1957	Tier 2	'Suomensarja (Second Division)	West Group	Finnish FA (Suomen Palloliitto)	6th	
1958	Tier 2	'Suomensarja (Second Division)	North Group	Finnish FA (Suomen Palloliitto)	5th	
1959	Tier 2	'Suomensarja (Second Division)	North Group	Finnish FA (Suomen Palloliitto)	6th	
1960	Tier 2	'Suomensarja (Second Division)	North Group	Finnish FA (Suomen Palloliitto)	7th	
1961	Tier 2	'Suomensarja (Second Division)	North Group	Finnish FA (Suomen Palloliitto)	4th	
1962	Tier 2	'Suomensarja (Second Division)	North Group	Finnish FA (Suomen Palloliitto)	2nd	
1963	Tier 2	'Suomensarja (Second Division)	North Group	Finnish FA (Suomen Palloliitto)	9th	
1964	Tier 2	'Suomensarja (Second Division)	North Group	Finnish FA (Suomen Palloliitto)	6th	
1965	Tier 2	'Suomensarja (Second Division)	North Group	Finnish FA (Suomen Palloliitto)	1st	Promoted
1966	Tier 1	Mestaruussarja (Premier League)		Finnish FA (Suomen Palloliitto)	12th	Relegated
1967	Tier 2	'Suomensarja (Second Division)	North Group	Finnish FA (Suomen Palloliitto)	1st	Promotion Group 3rd
1968	Tier 2	'Suomensarja (Second Division)	North Group	Finnish FA (Suomen Palloliitto)	1st	Promotion Group 3rd
1969	Tier 2	'Suomensarja (Second Division)	North Group	Finnish FA (Suomen Palloliitto)	2nd	
1970	Tier 2	'II Divisioona (Second Division)	North Group	Finnish FA (Suomen Palloliitto)	2nd	Promotion Group 1st - Promoted
1971	Tier 1	Mestaruussarja (Premier League)		Finnish FA (Suomen Palloliitto)	12th	Relegated
1972	Tier 2	'II Divisioona (Second Division)	North Group	Finnish FA (Suomen Palloliitto)	1st	Promoted
1973	Tier 1	Mestaruussarja (Premier League)		Finnish FA (Suomen Palloliitto)	5th	
1974	Tier 1	Mestaruussarja (Premier League)		Finnish FA (Suomen Palloliitto)	7th	
1975	Tier 1	Mestaruussarja (Premier League)		Finnish FA (Suomen Palloliitto)	11th	Relegation Playoff - Relegated
1976	Tier 2	'I Divisioona (First Division)		Finnish FA (Suomen Palloliitto)	2nd	Promoted
1977	Tier 1	Mestaruussarja (Premier League)		Finnish FA (Suomen Palloliitto)	10th	
1978	Tier 1	Mestaruussarja (Premier League)		Finnish FA (Suomen Palloliitto)	12th	Relegated
1979	Tier 2	'I Divisioona (First Division)		Finnish FA (Suomen Palloliitto)	2nd	Promotion Group 2nd - Promoted
1980	Tier 1	SM-Sarja (Premier League)		Finnish FA (Suomen Palloliitto)	9th	Relegation Group 7th - Relegated
1981	Tier 2	'I Divisioona (First Division)		Finnish FA (Suomen Palloliitto)	8th	Relegation Group 1st
1982	Tier 2	'I Divisioona (First Division)		Finnish FA (Suomen Palloliitto)	6th	Relegation Group 4th
1983	Tier 2	'I Divisioona (First Division)		Finnish FA (Suomen Palloliitto)	5th	Relegation Group 1st
1984	Tier 2	'I Divisioona (First Division)		Finnish FA (Suomen Palloliitto)	1st	Promoted
1985	Tier 1	SM-Sarja (Premier League)		Finnish FA (Suomen Palloliitto)	10th	
1986	Tier 1	SM-Sarja (Premier League)		Finnish FA (Suomen Palloliitto)	12th	Relegated
1987	Tier 2	'I Divisioona (First Division)		Finnish FA (Suomen Palloliitto)	1st	Promoted
1988	Tier 1	SM-Sarja (Premier League)		Finnish FA (Suomen Palloliitto)	10th	Relegation Group 4th
1989	Tier 1	SM-Sarja (Premier League)		Finnish FA (Suomen Palloliitto)	10th	Relegation Group 3rd
1990	Tier 1	Futisliiga (Premier League)		Finnish FA (Suomen Palloliitto)	10th	
1991	Tier 1	Futisliiga (Premier League)		Finnish FA (Suomen Palloliitto)	11th	Relegation Playoff
1992-94	Merged with OLS to form FC Oulu					
1996	Tier 3	Kakkonen (Second Division)	North Group	Finnish FA (Suomen Pallolitto)	5th	
1997	Tier 3	Kakkonen (Second Division)	North Group	Finnish FA (Suomen Pallolitto)	12th	Relegated
1998	Tier 4	Kolmonen (Third Division)	Group 8 Oulu-Kainuu	Northern Finland (SPL Pohjois-Suomi)	4th	
1999	Tier 4	Kolmonen (Third Division)	Group 8 Oulu-Kainuu	Northern Finland (SPL Pohjois-Suomi)	5th	Relegation Group 2nd
2000	Tier 4	Kolmonen (Third Division)	Oulu-Kainuu	Northern Finland (SPL Pohjois-Suomi)	3rd	
2001	Tier 4	Kolmonen (Third Division)	Oulu-Kainuu	Northern Finland (SPL Pohjois-Suomi)	10th	Relegated
2002	Merged with Tervarit, OLS and OPS to form AC Oulu					
2002-08	Only youth teams					
2010	Tier 6	Vitonen (Fifth Division)		Northern Finland (SPL Pohjois-Suomi)	2nd	Promoted
2011	Tier 5	Nelonen (Fourth Division)	Oulu	Northern Finland (SPL Pohjois-Suomi)	1st	
2012	Tier 5	Nelonen (Fourth Division)	Oulu	Northern Finland (SPL Pohjois-Suomi)	4th	
2013	Tier 4	Kolmonen (Third Division)		Northern Finland (SPL Pohjois-Suomi)	11th	Relegated
2014	Tier 5	Nelonen (Fourth Division)	Oulu	Northern Finland (SPL Pohjois-Suomi)	3rd	
2015	Tier 5	Nelonen (Fourth Division)	Oulu-Kainuu	Northern Finland (SPL Pohjois-Suomi)	2nd	
2016	Tier 4	Kolmonen (Third Division)		Northern Finland (SPL Pohjois-Suomi)	2nd	Promoted
2017	Tier 3	Kakkonen (Second Division)	Group C	Finnish FA (Suomen Pallolitto)	12th	Relegated
2018	Tier 4	Kolmonen (Third Division)		Northern Finland (SPL Pohjois-Suomi)	5th	
2019	Tier 4	Kolmonen (Third Division)		Northern Finland (SPL Pohjois-Suomi)	7th	

- 14 seasons in Veikkausliiga
- 22 seasons in Ykkönen
- 6 seasons in Kakkonen
- 8 seasons in Kolmonen
- 4 seasons in Nelonen
- 1 seasons in Vitonen
