= Kuusankosken Kumu =

Finnish football club

- Full name: Kumu Edustus
- Nickname: Kumu
- Founded: 1964; 62 years ago
- Ground: Urheilupuisto, Kuusankoski (Kouvola)
- Capacity: 4,000
- League: Kolmonen
- 2026: TBD
Home colours	Away colours

Kuusankosken Kumu was a football club established in 1964 from Kuusankoski, Finland. The club played one season in the Finnish premier division Veikkausliiga in 1990.

Kumu was dissolved in 1992 due to financial problems and a new club FC Kumu was formed in 1993. FC Kumu merged with Pallo-Peikot in 1996 and the two clubs are known today as FC Kuusankoski.

== Season to season ==
Season to Season

Season	Level	Division	Section	Administration	Position	Movements
1966	Tier 4	Aluesarja (Fourth Division)	Group 10	Finnish FA (Suomen Pallolitto)	1st	Promoted
1967	Tier 3	Maakuntasarja (Third Division)	Group 6	Finnish FA (Suomen Pallolitto)	7th	
1968	Tier 3	Maakuntasarja (Third Division)	Group 5	Finnish FA (Suomen Pallolitto)	3rd	
1969	Tier 3	Maakuntasarja (Third Division)	Group 5	Finnish FA (Suomen Pallolitto)	4th	
1970	Tier 3	III Divisioona (Third Division)	Group 5	Finnish FA (Suomen Pallolitto)	5th	
1971	Tier 3	III Divisioona (Third Division)	Group 4	Finnish FA (Suomen Pallolitto)	6th	
1972	Tier 3	III Divisioona (Third Division)	Group 6	Finnish FA (Suomen Pallolitto)	4th	
1973	Tier 4	III Divisioona (Third Division)	Group 6	Finnish FA (Suomen Pallolitto)	1st	Promoted
1974	Tier 3	II Divisioona (Second Division)	East Group	Finnish FA (Suomen Pallolitto)	8th	
1975	Tier 3	II Divisioona (Second Division)	East Group	Finnish FA (Suomen Pallolitto)	5th	
1976	Tier 3	II Divisioona (Second Division)	East Group	Finnish FA (Suomen Pallolitto)	11th	Relegated
1977	Tier 4	III Divisioona (Third Division)	Group 6	Finnish FA (Suomen Pallolitto)	7th	
1978	Tier 4	III Divisioona (Third Division)	Group 6	Finnish FA (Suomen Pallolitto)	3rd	
1979	Tier 4	III Divisioona (Third Division)	Group 6	Finnish FA (Suomen Pallolitto)	1st	Promotion Playoff
1980	Tier 4	III Divisioona (Third Division)	Group 6	Finnish FA (Suomen Pallolitto)	2nd	Promotion Playoff
1981	Tier 4	III Divisioona (Third Division)	Group 6	Finnish FA (Suomen Pallolitto)	3rd	
1982	Tier 4	III Divisioona (Third Division)	Group 6	Finnish FA (Suomen Pallolitto)	4th	
1983	Tier 4	III Divisioona (Third Division)	Group 6	Finnish FA (Suomen Pallolitto)	2nd	Promotion Playoff - Promoted
1984	Tier 3	II Divisioona (Second Division)	East Group	Finnish FA (Suomen Pallolitto)	11th	Relegated
1985	Tier 4	III Divisioona (Third Division)	Group 6	Finnish FA (Suomen Pallolitto)	1st	Promoted
1986	Tier 3	II Divisioona (Second Division)	East Group	Finnish FA (Suomen Pallolitto)	7th	
1987	Tier 3	II Divisioona (Second Division)	East Group	Finnish FA (Suomen Pallolitto)	3rd	
1988	Tier 3	II Divisioona (Second Division)	East Group	Finnish FA (Suomen Pallolitto)	1st	Promoted
1989	Tier 2	I Divisioona (First Division)		Finnish FA (Suomen Palloliitto)	2nd	Promotion Playoff - Promoted
1990	Tier 1	Futisliiga (Premier League)		Finnish FA (Suomen Palloliitto)	12th	Relegated
1991	Tier 2	I Divisioona (First Division)		Finnish FA (Suomen Palloliitto)	5th	
1992	Tier 2	I Divisioona (First Division)		Finnish FA (Suomen Palloliitto)	9th	Dissolved due financial difficulties
1996-2010	Part of FC Kuusankoski					
2016	Tier 7	Kutonen (sixth Division)	North Group	South-East Finland (SPL Kaakkois-Suomi)	2nd	Promoted
2017	Tier 6	Vitonen (Fifth Division)	West Group	South-East Finland (SPL Kaakkois-Suomi)	9th	
2018	Tier 6	Vitonen (Fifth Division)	West Group	South-East Finland (SPL Kaakkois-Suomi)	5th	

- 1 seasons in Veikkausliiga
- 3 seasons in Ykkönen
- 13 seasons in Kakkonen
- 10 seasons in Kolmonen
- 1 seasons in Kutonen
