= FC Oulu =

Finnish football club

- Founded: 1991
- Dissolved: 1994
- Manager: Timo Salmi
- League: Veikkausliiga
- 1994: 13th (relegated)

FC Oulu was a Finnish football club, based in the town of Oulu.

It was founded in autumn 1991 when OTP and OLS merged. It played in Veikkausliiga in 1992 and 1994 seasons.

After the 1994 season the team relegated again and went bankrupt.

== Managers ==
- (Finland) Heikki Suhonen (1992)
- (Finland) Juha Malinen (1993)
- (Finland) Timo Salmi (1994)
