= TP-Seinäjoki =

Finnish football club

TP-Seinäjoki is a football club based in Seinäjoki, Finland. It was established in 1955 as Törnävän Pallo-55 (TP-55). The name was changed in 1994.

TP-Seinäjoki played one season in the Finnish premier division Veikkausliiga in 1997. Since 2007 the club has focused on junior level football. The senior section is today controlled by SJK, which currently plays in the Finnish top tier Veikkausliiga.

== Season to season ==
Season to Season

Season	Level	Division	Section	Administration	Position	Movements
1957	Tier 4	Aluesarja (Fourth Division)	Group 15 - Vaasa	Finnish FA (Suomen Palloliitto)	4th	
1958	Tier 4	Aluesarja (Fourth Division)	Group 14 - Vaasa	Finnish FA (Suomen Palloliitto)	5th	Relegated
1959	Tier 5	Piirinsarja (District League)		Vaasa District (SPL Vaasa)	3rd	Promotion Playoff - Promoted
1960	Tier 4	Aluesarja (Fourth Division)	Group 17 - Central Ostrobothnia	Finnish FA (Suomen Palloliitto)	2nd	
1961	Tier 4	Aluesarja (Fourth Division)	Group 15 - Vaasa	Finnish FA (Suomen Palloliitto)	5th	Relegated
1962	Tier 5	Piirinsarja (District League)		Vaasa District (SPL Vaasa)		Promotion Playoff - Promoted
1963	Tier 4	Aluesarja (Fourth Division)	Group 15 - Vaasa	Finnish FA (Suomen Palloliitto)	5th	
1964	Tier 4	Aluesarja (Fourth Division)	Group 16 - Central Ostrobothnia	Finnish FA (Suomen Palloliitto)	1st	Promoted
1965	Tier 3	Maakuntasarja (Third Division)	Group 8 Vaasa & Central Ostrobothnia	Finnish FA (Suomen Palloliitto)	7th	Relegated
1966	Tier 4	Aluesarja (Fourth Division)	Group 15 - Vaasa	Finnish FA (Suomen Palloliitto)	3rd	
1967	Tier 4	Aluesarja (Fourth Division)	Group 15 - Vaasa	Finnish FA (Suomen Palloliitto)	1st	Promoted
1968	Tier 3	Maakuntasarja (Third Division)	Group 7 Vaasa & Central Ostrobothnia	Finnish FA (Suomen Palloliitto)	10th	Relegated
1969	Tier 4	Aluesarja (Fourth Division)	Group 14 - Vaasa	Finnish FA (Suomen Palloliitto)	7th	
1970	Tier 4	IV Divisioona (Fourth Division)	Group 15 - Vaasa	Finnish FA (Suomen Palloliitto)	6th	
1971	Tier 4	IV Divisioona (Fourth Division)	Group 11 - Central Ostrobothnia	Finnish FA (Suomen Palloliitto)	4th	
1972	Tier 4	IV Divisioona (Fourth Division)	Group 16 - Central Ostrobothnia	Finnish FA (Suomen Palloliitto)	5th	
1973	Tier 5	IV Divisioona (Fourth Division)	Group 16 - Central Ostrobothnia	Finnish FA (Suomen Palloliitto)	4th	
1974	Tier 5	IV Divisioona (Fourth Division)	Group 16 - Central Ostrobothnia	Finnish FA (Suomen Palloliitto)	8th	
1975	Tier 5	IV Divisioona (Fourth Division)	Group 15 - Vaasa	Finnish FA (Suomen Palloliitto)	3rd	
1976	Tier 5	IV Divisioona (Fourth Division)	Group 15 - Vaasa	Finnish FA (Suomen Palloliitto)	2nd	
1977	Tier 5	IV Divisioona (Fourth Division)	Group 15 - Vaasa	Finnish FA (Suomen Palloliitto)	6th	
1978	Tier 5	IV Divisioona (Fourth Division)	Group 15 - Vaasa	Finnish FA (Suomen Palloliitto)	3rd	Promotion Playoff - Promotion Group V 1st - Promoted
1979	Tier 4	III Divisioona (Third Division)	Group 8 - Central Ostrobothnia & Vaasa	Finnish FA (Suomen Palloliitto)	8th	
1980	Tier 4	III Divisioona (Third Division)	Group 8 - Central Ostrobothnia & Vaasa	Finnish FA (Suomen Palloliitto)	8th	
1981	Tier 4	III Divisioona (Third Division)	Group 8 - Central Ostrobothnia & Vaasa	Finnish FA (Suomen Palloliitto)	3rd	
1982	Tier 4	III Divisioona (Third Division)	Group 8 - Central Ostrobothnia & Vaasa	Finnish FA (Suomen Palloliitto)	6th	
1983	Tier 4	III Divisioona (Third Division)	Group 8 - Central Ostrobothnia & Vaasa	Finnish FA (Suomen Palloliitto)	4th	
1984	Tier 4	III Divisioona (Third Division)	Group 8 - Central Ostrobothnia & Vaasa	Finnish FA (Suomen Palloliitto)	4th	
1985	Tier 4	III Divisioona (Third Division)	Group 5 - Tampere & Central Finland	Finnish FA (Suomen Palloliitto)	2nd	
1986	Tier 4	III Divisioona (Third Division)	Group 5 - Tampere & Central Finland	Finnish FA (Suomen Palloliitto)	1st	Promoted
1987	Tier 3	II Divisioona (Second Division)	North Group	Finnish FA (Suomen Palloliitto)	2nd	
1988	Tier 3	II Divisioona (Second Division)	North Group	Finnish FA (Suomen Palloliitto)	3rd	
1989	Tier 3	II Divisioona (Second Division)	North Group	Finnish FA (Suomen Palloliitto)	1st	Promoted
1990	Tier 2	I Divisioona (First Division)		Finnish FA (Suomen Pallolitto)	6th	
1991	Tier 2	I Divisioona (First Division)		Finnish FA (Suomen Pallolitto)	3rd	
1992	Tier 2	Ykkönen (First Division)		Finnish FA (Suomen Pallolitto)	8th	
1993	Tier 2	Ykkönen (First Division)		Finnish FA (Suomen Pallolitto)	12th	Relegation Group 8th - Relegated
1994	Tier 3	Kakkonen (Second Division)	North Group	Finnish FA (Suomen Palloliitto)	9th	
1995	Tier 3	Kakkonen (Second Division)	West Group	Finnish FA (Suomen Palloliitto)	1st	Promoted
1996	Tier 2	Ykkönen (First Division)	North Group	Finnish FA (Suomen Pallolitto)	1st	Promotion Playoff - Promoted
1997	Tier 1	Veikkausliiga (Premier League)		Finnish FA (Suomen Palloliitto)	9th	Relegation Playoff - Relegated
1998	Tier 2	Ykkönen (First Division)	North Group	Finnish FA (Suomen Pallolitto)	4th	Promotion Group 7th
1999	Tier 2	Ykkönen (First Division)	North Group	Finnish FA (Suomen Pallolitto)	5th	Promotion Group 9th
2000	Tier 2	Ykkönen (First Division)	North Group	Finnish FA (Suomen Pallolitto)	6th	Relegation Group North 1st
2001	Tier 2	Ykkönen (First Division)	North Group	Finnish FA (Suomen Pallolitto)	3rd	
2002	Tier 2	Ykkönen (First Division)	North Group	Finnish FA (Suomen Pallolitto)	8th	Relegation Group North 9th - Relegated
2003	Tier 3	Kakkonen (Second Division)	North Group	Finnish FA (Suomen Palloliitto)	5th	
2004	Tier 3	Kakkonen (Second Division)	East Group	Finnish FA (Suomen Palloliitto)	7th	
2005	Tier 3	Kakkonen (Second Division)	West Group	Finnish FA (Suomen Palloliitto)	6th	
2006	Tier 3	Kakkonen (Second Division)	Group C	Finnish FA (Suomen Palloliitto)	5th	
2007	Tier 3	Kakkonen (Second Division)	Group C	Finnish FA (Suomen Palloliitto)	9th	Senior team merged with Sepsi-78 to form SJK

- 1 seasons in Veikkausliiga
- 10 seasons in Ykkönen
- 12 seasons in Kakkonen
- 20 seasons in Fourth Tier
- 8 seasons in Fifth Tier
