= 1990 Futisliiga =

Futisliiga
- Season: 1990

The 1990 Futisliiga was won by Kuusysi Lahti. However during the playoff Helsingin JK won the Finland national championship.

Statistics of Futisliiga in the 1990 season.

== Overview ==
It was contested by 12 teams, and HJK Helsinki won the championship.

== Preliminary stage ==
=== Table ===
Pos	Team	Pld	W	D	L	GF	GA	GD	Pts	Qualification or relegation
1	Kuusysi Lahti	22	14	5	3	34	12	+22	33	Qualification to Championship play-offs
2	RoPS Rovaniemi	22	12	5	5	29	17	+12	29	Qualification to Championship play-offs
3	HJK Helsinki (C)	22	11	6	5	40	29	+11	28	Qualification to Championship play-offs
4	KuPS Kuopio	22	8	8	6	24	22	+2	24	Qualification to Championship play-offs
5	Reipas Lahti	22	7	9	6	35	21	+14	23	Qualification to Championship play-offs
6	TPS Turku	22	7	9	6	27	20	+7	23	Qualification to Championship play-offs
7	MP Mikkeli	22	6	11	5	20	22	−2	23	Qualification to Championship play-offs
8	Haka Valkeakoski	22	8	6	8	27	34	−7	22	Qualification to Championship play-offs
9	Ilves Tampere	22	6	8	8	37	33	+4	20	Qualification to Cup Winners' Cup first round (Note: Ilves Tampere as winners of the 1990 Finnish Cup qualified for the first round of the 1991–92 Cup Winners' Cup.)
10	OTP Oulu	22	4	7	11	16	32	−16	15	
11	KPV Kokkola (R)	22	6	3	13	15	32	−17	15	Qualification to relegation play-offs
12	Kumu Kuusankoski (R)	22	1	7	14	13	43	−30	9	Relegation to Ykkönen

Source: rsssf.com
(C) Champions; (R) Relegated

=== Results ===
Home \ Away	HAK	HJK	ILV	KPV	KUM	KPS	KUU	MP	OTP	REI	RPS	TPS
FC Haka		3–1	3–3	2–0	1–0	1–2	0–2	1–1	2–1	0–6	0–1	3–2
HJK Helsinki	2–1		2–2	1–0	5–3	1–1	0–3	4–1	1–0	0–2	3–0	2–0
Ilves	2–3	1–1		1–0	3–0	0–1	1–1	0–0	4–2	2–2	1–2	0–0
KPV	0–2	3–6	0–4		2–0	0–2	1–0	3–1	0–0	1–1	2–1	0–3
Kumu	0–0	0–4	1–1	0–1		1–1	0–2	1–3	3–2	1–1	1–2	0–4
KuPS	1–1	2–3	2–1	1–0	4–1		2–3	0–0	0–0	1–1	1–4	2–0
Kuusysi	5–0	1–0	2–1	2–0	0–0	2–0		1–2	3–1	0–0	2–1	0–0
MP	2–1	1–1	2–0	2–1	1–1	0–0	0–1		0–0	0–3	1–1	1–1
OTP	0–0	0–1	0–5	2–0	1–0	0–1	1–2	2–0		0–0	0–0	0–4
Reipas	2–1	1–1	7–1	0–1	3–0	0–0	0–2	0–2	1–1		0–1	2–3
RoPS	1–1	3–0	2–0	1–0	2–0	1–0	2–0	0–0	2–3	1–0		1–1
TPS	0–1	1–1	0–4	0–0	0–0	2–0	0–0	0–0	3–0	2–3	1–0	

Legend: Blue = home team win; Yellow = draw; Red = away team win.

== Championship playoffs ==
=== Quarterfinals ===
Team 1	Agg.	Team 2	1st leg	2nd leg	3rd leg
Kuusysi Lahti	2–0	Haka Valkeakoski	3–1	2–2 (4–3 p)	
RoPS Rovaniemi	1–2	MP Mikkeli	1–1 (4–5 p)	2–1	0–1
TPS Turku	1–2	HJK Helsinki	0–0 (3–2 p)	1–2	1–3
KuPS Kuopio	0–2	Reipas Lahti	1–1 (4–5 p)	0–2	

=== Semifinals ===
Team 1	Agg.	Team 2	1st leg	2nd leg
Kuusysi Lahti	2–0	MP Mikkeli	3–1	1–0
HJK Helsinki	2–0	Reipas Lahti	3–2	3–2

=== For third place ===
Team 1	Score	Team 2
Reipas Lahti	1–6	MP Mikkeli

MP Mikkeli were qualified for the first round of the 1991–92 UEFA Cup.

=== Finals ===
Team 1	Agg.	Team 2	1st leg	2nd leg
Kuusysi Lahti	0–2	HJK Helsinki	1–1 (3–4 p)	0–1

The champions HJK Helsinki were qualified for the first round of the 1991–92 European Cup, while the Kuusysi Lahti were qualified for the first round of the 1991–92 UEFA Cup.

== Attendances ==
No.	Club	Average
1	HJK	4,673
2	Ilves	3,169
3	Reipas	2,608
4	TPS	2,503
5	KuPS	2,428
6	RoPS	2,289
7	Kuusysi	2,232
8	Kumu	1,923
9	KPV	1,738
10	MP	1,482
11	Oulu	1,212
12	Haka	961

== See also ==
- Ykkönen (Tier 2)
