= 1991 Futisliiga =

Futisliiga
- Season: 1991

Statistics of Futisliiga in the 1991 season.

== Overview ==
It was contested by 12 teams, and Kuusysi Lahti won the championship.

== League standings ==
Pos	Team	Pld	W	D	L	GF	GA	GD	Pts	Qualification or relegation
1	Kuusysi Lahti (C)	33	16	11	6	57	35	+22	59	Qualification to Champions League first round
2	MP Mikkeli	33	17	7	9	60	36	+24	58	Qualification to UEFA Cup first round
3	Haka Valkeakoski	33	16	6	11	59	37	+22	54	
4	Jaro Jakobstad	33	14	11	8	46	33	+13	53	
5	HJK Helsinki	33	14	9	10	61	44	+17	51	
6	Ilves Tampere	33	13	12	8	51	39	+12	51	
7	RoPS Rovaniemi	33	14	8	11	63	51	+12	50	
8	PPT Pori	33	11	10	12	52	44	+8	43	
9	TPS Turku	33	11	10	12	47	56	−9	43	Qualification to Cup Winners' Cup first round (Note: TPS Turku as winners of the 1991 Finnish Cup qualified for the first round of the 1992–93 Cup Winners' Cup.)
10	KuPS Kuopio	33	8	13	12	54	54	0	37	
11	OTP Oulu (O)	33	7	11	15	33	53	−20	32	Qualification to relegation play-offs
12	Reipas Lahti (R)	33	2	2	29	17	118	−101	8	Relegation to Ykkönen

Source: rsssf.com
(C) Champions; (O) Play-off winners; (R) Relegated

== Results ==
=== Matches 1–22 ===
Home \ Away	HAK	HJK	ILV	JAR	KPS	KUU	MP	OTP	PPT	REI	RPS	TPS
FC Haka		0–2	3–1	3–1	0–0	1–2	0–0	0–2	0–1	4–0	3–1	4–0
HJK Helsinki	2–0		2–2	2–2	1–1	0–4	0–3	3–0	3–2	8–2	3–0	1–1
Ilves	1–3	0–0		3–1	3–0	1–1	2–1	1–1	2–3	5–0	1–2	1–0
Jaro	3–1	1–0	1–0		0–3	2–0	3–1	0–0	2–2	5–0	2–1	0–0
KuPS	5–2	2–2	2–2	0–2		0–2	1–1	3–0	2–1	2–2	4–0	5–2
Kuusysi	0–0	2–0	1–1	2–1	2–2		1–1	2–0	1–0	0–2	2–0	1–1
MP	1–3	3–1	0–1	1–0	0–0	2–4		1–1	0–1	3–0	2–1	6–0
OTP	0–0	1–3	0–2	0–0	2–0	2–7	0–0		1–0	3–1	0–0	0–1
PPT	1–2	1–1	2–2	2–0	2–0	1–1	2–3	2–2		5–0	3–0	0–0
Reipas	0–5	1–6	0–1	0–0	1–2	0–1	0–3	0–1	2–0		0–3	1–2
RoPS	1–0	2–1	0–0	3–0	3–2	1–4	5–1	1–0	2–2	2–0		4–3
TPS	0–2	0–2	2–2	1–4	0–0	2–2	3–0	3–2	0–3	4–0	0–0	

Legend: Blue = home team win; Yellow = draw; Red = away team win.

=== Matches 23–33 ===
Home \ Away	HAK	HJK	ILV	JAR	KPS	KUU	MP	OTP	PPT	REI	RPS	TPS
FC Haka			1–2			1–1	1–1		2–1		4–1	5–0
HJK Helsinki	3–0			3–1			0–4	0–0	3–0	4–1		
Ilves		1–0		1–1	1–1		0–1	4–2		5–0		
Jaro	2–0					1–1	1–0	1–0	1–1			1–1
KuPS	0–1	1–2		1–1		1–2						1–4
Kuusysi		2–0	1–1				2–3			1–0	1–3	0–1
MP					3–0			3–0	1–0	4–0	5–2	
OTP	2–3				1–1	2–3			2–1			1–5
PPT			0–1		4–4	2–1					1–1	2–0
Reipas	0–5			0–5	2–8			0–3	2–4			
RoPS		2–2	4–0	0–1	3–0			2–2		11–0		
TPS		2–1	3–1				1–2			3–0	2–2	

Legend: Blue = home team win; Yellow = draw; Red = away team win.

== Attendances ==
No.	Club	Average
1	HJK	3,493
2	Ilves	3,144
3	TPS	2,402
4	Jaro	2,092
5	Kuusysi	1,812
6	KuPS	1,805
7	Jazz	1,659
8	RoPS	1,539
9	MP	1,520
10	Haka	1,336
11	Oulu	981
12	Reipas	918

== See also ==
- Ykkönen (Tier 2)
