= 1992 Veikkausliiga =

Veikkausliiga
- Season: 1992
- Champions: HJK Helsinki
- Matches: 187

Statistics of Veikkausliiga in the 1992 season. This was the first season under the Veikkausliiga brand.

== Overview ==
It was contested by 12 teams, and HJK Helsinki won the championship.

== League standings ==
Pos	Team	Pld	W	D	L	GF	GA	GD	Pts	Qualification or relegation
1	HJK Helsinki (C)	33	20	6	7	59	35	+24	66	Qualification to Champions League qualifying round
2	Kuusysi Lahti	33	19	6	8	61	38	+23	63	Qualification to UEFA Cup first round
3	FC Jazz Pori	33	18	9	6	62	42	+20	63	
4	MyPa Anjalankoski	33	16	8	9	57	29	+28	56	Qualification to Cup Winners' Cup qualifying round (Note: MyPa Anjalankoski as winners of the 1992 Finnish Cup qualified for the qualifying round of the 1993–94 Cup Winners' Cup.)
5	Jaro Jakobstad	33	14	8	11	49	37	+12	50	
6	Haka Valkeakoski	33	15	5	13	42	51	−9	50	
7	RoPS Rovaniemi	33	12	6	15	53	49	+4	42	
8	Ilves Tampere	33	10	5	18	45	56	−11	35	
9	TPS Turku	33	9	8	16	29	45	−16	35	
10	MP Mikkeli	33	10	3	20	34	60	−26	33	
11	FC Oulu (R)	33	9	5	19	42	68	−26	32	Qualification to relegation play-offs
12	KuPS Kuopio (R)	33	8	7	18	33	56	−23	31	Relegation to Ykkönen

Source: rsssf.com
(C) Champions; (R) Relegated

== Results ==
=== Matches 1–22 ===
Home \ Away	HAK	HJK	ILV	KPS	KUU	JAR	JAZ	MP	MYP	OUL	RPS	TPS
FC Haka		1–1	2–1	0–1	1–0	0–2	4–4	4–1	1–0	1–1	0–2	2–0
HJK Helsinki	3–1		4–0	4–0	0–1	2–2	3–2	3–1	2–1	3–2	4–1	3–1
Ilves	1–3	2–1		2–0	2–2	1–2	0–3	5–0	0–3	4–2	2–1	3–0
KuPS	3–0	0–1	4–1		1–2	1–3	2–2	1–3	1–0	1–3	2–2	1–2
Kuusysi	1–0	5–1	2–1	1–0		0–1	2–3	3–1	1–1	2–0	3–1	3–0
Jaro	0–1	0–0	1–0	2–1	1–2		2–2	0–3	1–1	4–1	3–1	1–0
Jazz	3–1	2–1	2–1	1–1	2–0	2–1		4–1	0–2	6–2	0–2	1–0
MP	1–2	1–0	0–1	1–1	1–3	0–0	0–2		0–2	0–1	2–0	1–1
MyPa	0–0	0–1	1–0	1–0	0–3	3–0	2–2	3–0		7–0	2–1	0–0
Oulu	4–1	4–1	1–0	2–3	0–1	2–1	1–2	0–1	1–1		0–1	0–0
RoPS	7–0	1–3	1–1	1–1	2–0	1–0	0–1	3–0	3–3	3–0		0–3
TPS	1–1	0–1	1–1	3–0	2–0	0–0	0–0	2–0	0–2	3–0	3–0	

Legend: Blue = home team win; Yellow = draw; Red = away team win.

=== Matches 23–33 ===
Home \ Away	HAK	HJK	ILV	KPS	KUU	JAR	JAZ	MP	MYP	OUL	RPS	TPS
FC Haka				2–0	2–1			1–0	3–0	3–1	0–2	
HJK Helsinki	2–1		1–1	2–0			2–0		2–0	2–1		
Ilves	4–0			1–2			2–3		1–3	2–2		
KuPS					1–6			0–1	1–0	3–1	0–0	
Kuusysi		1–1	3–0			2–2		1–0			1–6	4–1
Jaro	3–0	0–1	3–2	4–0			1–1					4–0
Jazz	1–3			1–1	2–2					2–0	2–1	2–0
MP		1–3	3–1			1–3	2–0					1–0
MyPa					2–2	1–0	0–2	3–0		4–1		5–0
Oulu					0–1	2–1		5–3			1–0	1–1
RoPS		0–0	0–1			3–1		2–4	0–4			
TPS	0–1	2–1	0–1	1–0							2–5	

Legend: Blue = home team win; Yellow = draw; Red = away team win.

== Attendances ==
No.	Club	Average
1	HJK	3,250
2	Jazz	3,052
3	Ilves	2,892
4	MyPa	1,968
5	TPS	1,896
6	Jaro	1,811
7	Kuusysi	1,639
8	KuPS	1,618
9	RoPS	1,541
10	Oulu	1,478
11	Haka	1,382
12	MP	1,280

== See also ==
- Ykkönen (Tier 2)
