= 1992 Belgian Cup final =

- Event: 1991–92 Belgian Cup
Antwerp	KV Mechelen
2	2
- After extra time Antwerp won 9–8 on penalties
- Date: 7 June 1992
- Venue: Olympiastadion, Bruges
- Referee: Alphonse Constantin
- Attendance: 20,000

The 1992 Belgian Cup final took place on 7 June 1992 between Royal Antwerp and KV Mechelen and was the 37th Belgian Cup final. Both clubs got a chance to win their second Belgian Cup, after Antwerp had already won in 1955, while Mechelen was victorious in 1987. The match ended in a 2–2 draw after extra time and was won by Antwerp on penalty kicks (9–8). Antwerp thus qualified for the 1992–93 European Cup Winners' Cup where it would go on to lose the final.

36 years later both clubs would again meet in the final of the 2022–23 Belgian Cup.

== Route to the final ==
Antwerp				KV Mechelen
Opponent	Result	Legs	Round	Opponent	Result	Legs
Mol	3–0	3–0 away	Round of 64	Brainois	3–0	3–0 home
Union SG	1–0	1–0 home	Round of 32	Olympic Charleroi	3–0	3–0 away
Tienen	1–0	1–0 home	Round of 16	RFC Liège	2–1 (a.e.t.)	2–1 away
Lommel	2–1	0–1 away; 2–0 home	Quarter-finals	Beveren	2–1	0–0 away; 2–1 home
Gent	2–1	1–1 away; 1–0 home	Semi-finals	Standard Liège	3–1	1–1 home; 2–0 away

== Match ==
=== Summary ===
While the first half was a dull affair, KV Mechelen took the initiative in the second half and got the best chances to take the lead with Marc Emmers seeing his shot punched away by Svilar, Philippe Albert dribbling past several Antwerp players and Zlatko Arambasic missing a big opportunity. Antwerp was able to open the score against the run of play, with Wim Kiekens heading in a free kick by Patrick Van Veirdeghem with just under 20 minutes to play. Somewhat later a penalty kick could possibly have been given for a tackle by Gijsbrechts on Alex Czerniatynski but referee Alphonse Constantin judged it not to be a foul. Mechelen was not able to respond until two minutes before the end of the regular time when Zlatko Arambasic was able to outrun the entire Antwerp defense and score the equalizer.

Mechelen kept the momentum going as only five minutes into extra-time René Eijkelkamp was able to convert a long-range kick over Svilar to give his team the lead. At the other end Michel Preud'homme needed cat-like reflexes to keep Czerniatynski from heading in the equalizer. With several Mechelen players starting to become fatigued and suffer from cramps, it seemed inevitable that Antwerp would score. First Hans-Peter Lehnhoff hit the crossbar, but eventually just three minutes before the end of the game, Alex Czerniatynski was able to easily tap in a loose ball after Michel Preud'homme could not hold on to a difficult shot by Willy Vincent.

The penalty shootout would become the longest ever in a Belgian Cup Final (and still is as of 2022), as 22 penalty kicks were needed to decide a winner, with Ratko Svilar eventually saving the shot by Lei Clijsters.

=== Details ===
The details of the game are summarized in the following table:

7 June 1992
16:00 CET

Antwerp	2–2 (a.e.t.)	KV Mechelen
Kiekens 72'; Czerniatynski 117'	Report	Arambasic 88'; Eijkelkamp 95'
Penalties
Vincent (penalty missed); Broeckaert (penalty scored); Van Rethy (penalty missed); Kiekens (penalty scored); Lehnhoff (penalty scored); Smidts (penalty scored); Ukkonen (penalty scored); Czerniatynski (penalty scored); Jakovljević (penalty scored); Emmerechts (penalty scored); Svilar (penalty scored)	9–8	(penalty scored) Preud'homme; (penalty missed) Eijkelkamp; (penalty scored) Versavel; (penalty missed) Emmers; (penalty scored) Albert; (penalty scored) Bartholomeeusen; (penalty scored) Bogers; (penalty scored) Arambasic; (penalty scored) Severeyns; (penalty scored) Gijsbrechts; (penalty missed) Clijsters

Olympiastadion, Bruges
Attendance: 20,000
Referee: Alphonse Constantin

GK	(Federal Republic of Yugoslavia) Ratko Svilar
RB	(Belgium) Wim Kiekens
CB	(Belgium) Nico Broeckaert
CB	(Belgium) Geert Emmerechts	Booked
LB	(Belgium) Rudi Smidts (c)
MF	(Belgium) Ronny Van Rethy
MF	(Belgium) Patrick Van Veirdeghem		(substituted off) 115'
MF	(Germany) Hans-Peter Lehnhoff
MF	(Federal Republic of Yugoslavia) Dragan Jakovljević
FW	(Belgium) Nico Claesen		(substituted off) 91'
FW	(Belgium) Alex Czerniatynski
Substitutes:
FW	(Mauritius) Willy Vincent		(substituted off) 91'
DF	(Finland) Kari Ukkonen		(substituted off) 115'
Manager:
(Belgium) Walter Meeuws

GK	(Belgium) Michel Preud'homme
RB	(Belgium) Koen Sanders		Substituted off
CB	(Belgium) Davy Gijsbrechts
CB	(Belgium) Lei Clijsters (c)	Booked
LB	(Netherlands) Adrie Bogers
MF	(Belgium) Joël Bartholomeeusen
MF	(Belgium) Philippe Albert
MF	(Belgium) Marc Emmers
MF	(Belgium) Frank Leen		Substituted off
FW	(Australia) Zlatko Arambasic
FW	(Netherlands) René Eijkelkamp
Substitutes:
DF	(Belgium) Patrick Versavel		Substituted on
FW	(Belgium) Francis Severeyns		Substituted on
Manager:
(Belgium) Georges Leekens

Match rules

- 90 minutes.
- 30 minutes of extra time if necessary.
- Penalty shoot-out if scores still level.
- Maximum of three substitutions.
