= 1993 European Cup Winners' Cup final =

- Match programme cover
- Event: 1992–93 European Cup Winners' Cup
Parma	Antwerp
(Italy)	(Belgium)
3	1
- Date: 12 May 1993
- Venue: Wembley Stadium, London
- Referee: Karl-Josef Assenmacher (Germany)
- Attendance: 37,393

The 1993 European Cup Winners' Cup final was a football match contested between Parma of Italy and Antwerp of Belgium. The final was held at Wembley Stadium in London, England on 12 May 1993. It was the final match of the 1992–93 European Cup Winners' Cup and the 33rd European Cup Winners' Cup final. Parma beat Antwerp 3–1 and in doing so became the eighth different Italian team to win a European trophy. Upon the abolition of the competition in 1999, this was the last final where the winners won by more than a goal.

The victory marked Parma’s first European trophy in only their second season of European competition. They were the first Italian team to appear in the Cup Winners' Cup final since Sampdoria, who had appeared in 1989 and 1990. Antwerp, meanwhile, made their first-ever appearance in a European final. The most recent Belgian finalist before 1993 had been Anderlecht in 1990, who lost 2–0 to Sampdoria after extra time.

As the winners, Parma contested the 1993 European Super Cup against 1992–93 UEFA Champions League runners-up Milan, after champions Marseille had been banned from European competition over match-fixing allegations.

This was the last European club tournament final staged at the old Wembley, as it was going to be rebuilt to an all-new stadium.

== Background ==
The 1993 final marked the first meeting between Parma and Antwerp. Both teams were seeking their first piece of European silverware, and it was Parma’s first encounter with Belgian opposition. Additionally, neither manager had previously guided a team to a European final.

Wembley Stadium in London had hosted the European Cup Winners' Cup final on one previous occasion: in 1965. Londoners West Ham United won the game by two goals to nil against West German opposition 1860 Munich in front of 97,974 people, the biggest ever attendance at a Cup Winners' Cup final.

== Route to the final ==
(Italy) Parma				Opponent	(Belgium) Antwerp			
Opponent	Agg.	1st leg	2nd leg	Round	Opponent	Agg.	1st leg	2nd leg
(Hungary) Újpest	2–1	1–0 (H)	1–1 (A)	First round	(Northern Ireland) Glenavon	2–2 (3–1 p)	1–1 (A)	1–1 (a.e.t.) (H)
(Portugal) Boavista	2–0	0–0 (H)	2–0 (A)	Second round	(Austria) Admira	7–6	4–2 (A)	3–4 (a.e.t.) (H)
(Czechoslovakia) Sparta Prague	2–0	0–0 (A)	2–0 (H)	Quarter-finals	(Romania) Steaua București	1–1 (a)	0–0 (H)	1–1 (A)
(Spain) Atlético Madrid	2–2 (a)	2–1 (A)	0–1 (H)	Semi-finals	(Russia) Spartak Moscow	3–2	0–1 (A)	3–1 (H)

== Match ==
=== Summary ===
Parma opened the scoring in the 10th minute when goalkeeper Stevan Stojanović misjudged a corner that allowed Parma's captain, Lorenzo Minotti to hook the ball home from the left of the penalty area. But Antwerp replied within two minutes, Alex Czerniatynski played a through-ball to Francis Severeyns who shot past the goalkeeper left footed to level the scores. The Italians began to dominate the game and Alessandro Melli headed them 2–1 ahead after half an hour after a cross from the right. The game was put beyond Antwerp six minutes from time when Stefano Cuoghi curled a shot past the goalkeeper from inside the area.

=== Details ===
12 May 1993
19:15 BST

Parma (Italy)	3–1	(Belgium) Antwerp
Minotti 9'; Melli 30'; Cuoghi 84'	Report	Severeyns 11'

Wembley Stadium, London
Attendance: 37,393
Referee: Karl-Josef Assenmacher (Germany)

Parma	Antwerp

GK	1	(Italy) Marco Ballotta
CB	6	(Belgium) Georges Grün
SW	4	(Italy) Lorenzo Minotti (c)
CB	5	(Italy) Luigi Apolloni
RWB	2	(Italy) Antonio Benarrivo
LWB	3	(Italy) Alberto Di Chiara	(yellow card) 32'
CM	9	(Italy) Marco Osio		(substituted off) 75'
CM	8	(Italy) Daniele Zoratto		(substituted off) 26'
CM	10	(Italy) Stefano Cuoghi
SS	11	(Sweden) Tomas Brolin
CF	7	(Italy) Alessandro Melli
Substitutes:
GK	12	(Italy) Marco Ferrari
DF	13	(Italy) Salvatore Matrecano
CM	14	(Italy) Gabriele Pin		(substituted on) 26'
MF	15	(Italy) Fausto Pizzi		(substituted on) 75'
FW	16	(Colombia) Faustino Asprilla
Manager:
(Italy) Nevio Scala

GK	1	(Federal Republic of Yugoslavia) Stevan Stojanović
CB	4	(Belgium) Rudi Taeymans
SW	3	(Belgium) Nico Broeckaert	(yellow card) 82'
CB	5	(Belgium) Rudi Smidts (c)
RWB	2	(Belgium) Wim Kiekens
LWB	8	(Belgium) Didier Segers	(yellow card) 65'	(substituted off) 82'
CM	7	(Belgium) Ronny Van Rethy
CM	6	(Federal Republic of Yugoslavia) Dragan Jakovljević		(substituted off) 51'
CM	10	(Germany) Hans-Peter Lehnhoff
CF	9	(Belgium) Francis Severeyns	(yellow card) 37'
CF	11	(Belgium) Alexandre Czerniatynski
Substitutes:
DF	12	(Belgium) Geert Emmerechts
MF	13	(Belgium) Garry De Graef
MF	14	(Belgium) Patrick Van Veirdeghem		(substituted on) 51'
FW	15	(Morocco) Noureddine Moukrim		(substituted on) 82'
GK	16	(Belgium) Wim De Coninck
Manager:
(Belgium) Walter Meeuws

Assistant referees:
Klaus Plettenberg (Germany)
Hans Wolf (Germany)
Fourth official:
Bernd Heynemann (Germany)

Match rules

- 90 minutes.
- 30 minutes of golden goal extra time if necessary.
- Penalty shoot-out if scores still level.
- Five named substitutes.
- Maximum of two substitutions.

== See also ==
- 1992–93 European Cup Winners' Cup
- 1993 European Cup Final
- 1993 UEFA Cup Final
- Parma Calcio 1913 in European football
- Royal Antwerp F.C. in European football
