= Kari Ukkonen =

Finnish footballer and manager (born 1961)

Personal information
- Full name: Kari Ukkonen
- Date of birth: 19 February 1961 (age 65)
- Place of birth: Kuopio, Finland
- Height: 1.82 m (6 ft 0 in)
- Position: Defender

Senior career*
| Years | Team | Apps | (Gls) |
| 1979–1982 | KuPS | 91 | (13) |
| 1982–1986 | Cercle Brugge | 107 | (16) |
| 1986–1987 | Lokeren | 32 | (8) |
| 1987–1991 | Anderlecht | 38 | (3) |
| 1991–1993 | Royal Antwerp | 39 | (1) |
| 1993–1996 | Châteauroux | 52 | (1) |

International career
| 1983–1996 | Finland | 59 | (4) |

Managerial career
- Finland (youth coach)
- 2004–2006: TPS
- * Club domestic league appearances and goals

Kari Ukkonen (born 19 February 1961) is a Finnish former football manager and former football player. As a player, Ukkonen was fielded as defender as well as midfielder.

He was inducted to the Finnish Football Hall of Fame in 2022.

== Club career ==
Ukkonen started playing football in his hometown club Kuopion Palloseura (KuPS) in top-tier Mestaruussarja in 1979. In 1982, Ukkonen moved from Finland to Belgium, when he was bought by Cercle Brugge. Ukkonen made his Belgian début on 13 November, when Cercle defeated SV Waregem with 2–1. Ukkonen would go on to win the Belgian Cup with Cercle in 1985. Ukkonen would spend most of his career in Belgium, also playing for other First division teams as Lokeren, Anderlecht and Royal Antwerp. Ukkonen ended his playing career with French side LB Châteauroux.

== International career ==
Ukkonen represented Finland at the 1980 Summer Olympics in Moscow. Three years later, he earned his first cap for Finland in a 1–1 draw against Poland. The same year, Ukkonen was voted Finnish Footballer of the Year by sports journalists and the Football Association of Finland. He made 59 appearances for the Finland national team, scoring four goals.

== Coaching career ==
He stayed in football as manager. First he was coach of Finland's national youth team. He was head coach of Finland at the 2001 World Youth Championship in Argentina.

His next job was the manager of Turun Palloseura (TPS) in 2004–2006.

== Career statistics ==
=== Club ===
As of 16 May 2024.

Appearances and goals by club, season and competition
| Club | Season | League | | | Domestic Cups (Note: Includes Suomen Cup, Belgian Cup, Belgian Super Cup, Belgian Ligabeker and Coupe de France) | | Europe | | Total | |
| Club | Season | Division | Apps | Goals | Apps | Goals | Apps | Goals | Apps | Goals |
|---|---|---|---|---|---|---|---|---|---|---|
| KuPS | 1979 | Mestaruussarja | 12 | 0 | | | | | 12 | 0 |
| KuPS | 1980 | Mestaruussarja | 26 | 2 | | | 2 (Note: Includes UEFA Cup) | 0 | 28 | 2 |
| KuPS | 1981 | Mestaruussarja | 25 | 7 | | | | | 25 | 7 |
| KuPS | 1982 | Mestaruussarja | 28 | 4 | | | | | 28 | 4 |
| KuPS | Total | | 91 | 13 | – | – | 2 | 0 | 93 | 13 |
| Cercle Brugge | 1982–83 | Belgian First Division | 21 | 2 | – | | – | | 21 | 2 |
| Cercle Brugge | 1983–84 | Belgian First Division | 30 | 1 | 1 | 0 | – | | 31 | 1 |
| Cercle Brugge | 1984–85 | Belgian First Division | 25 | 3 | 7 | 2 | – | | 32 | 5 |
| Cercle Brugge | 1985–86 | Belgian First Division | 31 | 10 | 13 | 1 | 2 (Note: Includes UEFA Cup Winners' Cup) | 0 | 46 | 11 |
| Cercle Brugge | Total | | 107 | 16 | 21 | 3 | 2 | 0 | 130 | 19 |
| Lokeren | 1986–87 | Belgian First Division | 32 | 8 | 2 | 1 | – | | 34 | 9 |
| RSC Anderlecht | 1987–88 | Belgian First Division | 14 | 1 | 4 | 0 | – | | 18 | 1 |
| RSC Anderlecht | 1988–89 | Belgian First Division | 15 | 0 | 3 | 0 | 3 | 0 | 21 | 0 |
| RSC Anderlecht | 1989–90 | Belgian First Division | 8 | 2 | 2 | 0 | 2 | 1 | 12 | 3 |
| RSC Anderlecht | 1990–91 | Belgian First Division | 2 | 0 | 0 | 0 | 0 | 0 | 2 | 0 |
| RSC Anderlecht | Total | | 39 | 3 | 9 | 0 | 5 | 1 | 53 | 4 |
| Royal Antwerp | 1991–92 | Belgian First Division | 27 | 0 | 5 | 0 | – | | 32 | 0 |
| Royal Antwerp | 1992–93 | Belgian First Division | 11 | 1 | 1 | 0 | 1 | 0 | 13 | 1 |
| Royal Antwerp | Total | | 38 | 1 | 6 | 0 | 1 | 0 | 45 | 1 |
| Châteauroux | 1993–94 | Division 2 | 0 | 0 | 1 | 1 | – | | 1 | 1 |
| Châteauroux | 1994–95 | Division 2 | 37 | 1 | 7 | 1 | – | | 44 | 2 |
| Châteauroux | 1995–96 | Division 2 | 15 | 0 | 1 | 0 | – | | 16 | 0 |
| Châteauroux | Total | | 52 | 1 | 9 | 2 | – | – | 61 | 3 |
| Career total | | | 359 | 42 | 47 | 6 | 10 | 1 | 416 | 49 |

=== International goals ===
As of match played 9 October 1991. Finland score listed first, score column indicates score after each Ukkonen goal.

List of international goals scored by Kari Ukkonen
| No. | Date | Venue | Opponent | Score | Result | Competition |
|---|---|---|---|---|---|---|
| 1 | 17 April 1985 | Odra Opole Stadium, Opole, Poland | Poland | 1–2 | 1–2 | Friendly |
| 2 | 19 October 1988 | Vetch Field, Swansea, Wales | Wales | 2–2 | 2–2 | 1990 FIFA World Cup qualification |
| 3 | 23 August 1989 | Väinölänniemen Stadium, Kuopio, Finland | Yugoslavia | 1–1 | 2–2 | Friendly |
| 4 | 9 October 1991 | Helsinki Olympic Stadium, Helsinki, Finland | Greece | 1–1 | 1–1 | UEFA Euro 1992 qualifying |

== Honours ==
- Belgian Cup:
  - Winner (4): 1985, 1988, 1989, 1992
  - Runner-up (1): 1986
- Belgian First Division:
  - Winner (1): 1990–91
  - Runner-up (2): 1988–89, 1989–90
