= Aki Lahtinen =

Finnish footballer (born 1958)

Personal information
- Date of birth: 31 October 1958 (age 67)
- Place of birth: Jyväskylä, Finland
- Height: 1.79 m (5 ft 10 in)
- Position: Defender

Senior career*
| Years | Team | Apps | (Gls) |
| 1976–1981 | OPS | 149 | (5) |
| 1981–1985 | Notts County | 45 | (2) |
| 1985–1987 | KePS | 49 | (3) |
| 1988–1990 | OTP | 58 | (1) |

International career
| 1979–1989 | Finland | 51 | (0) |
- * Club domestic league appearances and goals

Aki Lahtinen (born 31 October 1958) is a Finnish former footballer. Lahtinen was the second-ever Finnish player to play in the English top division. He was inducted to the Finnish Football Hall of Fame in 2022.

== Career statistics ==
Appearances and goals by club, season and competition
| Club | Season | League | | | FA Cup | | EFL Cup | | Europe | | Total | |
| Club | Season | Division | Apps | Goals | Apps | Goals | Apps | Goals | Apps | Goals | Apps | Goals |
|---|---|---|---|---|---|---|---|---|---|---|---|---|
| OPS | 1975 | Ykkönen | 29 | 3 | – | | – | | – | | 29 | 3 |
| OPS | 1976 | Mestaruussarja | 21 | 1 | – | | – | | – | | 21 | 1 |
| OPS | 1977 | Mestaruussarja | 19 | 0 | – | | – | | – | | 19 | 0 |
| OPS | 1978 | Mestaruussarja | 29 | 0 | – | | – | | – | | 29 | 0 |
| OPS | 1979 | Mestaruussarja | 28 | 0 | – | | – | | – | | 28 | 0 |
| OPS | 1980 | Mestaruussarja | 23 | 1 | – | | – | | 2 (Note: Appearances in European Cup) | 0 | 25 | 1 |
| OPS | Total | | 149 | 5 | 0 | 0 | 0 | 0 | 2 | 0 | 151 | 5 |
| Notts County | 1981–82 | First Division | 8 | 0 | 1 | 0 | 0 | 0 | – | | 9 | 0 |
| Notts County | 1982–83 | First Division | 17 | 2 | 0 | 0 | 1 | 0 | – | | 18 | 2 |
| Notts County | 1983–84 | First Division | 6 | 0 | 1 | 0 | 0 | 0 | – | | 7 | 0 |
| Notts County | 1984–85 | Second Division | 14 | 0 | | | | | – | | 14 | 0 |
| Notts County | Total | | 45 | 2 | 2 | 0 | 1 | 0 | 0 | 0 | 48 | 2 |
| KePS | 1985 | Mestaruussarja | 10 | 0 | – | | – | | – | | 10 | 0 |
| KePS | 1986 | Mestaruussarja | 17 | 3 | – | | – | | – | | 17 | 3 |
| KePS | 1987 | Mestaruussarja | 22 | 0 | – | | – | | – | | 22 | 0 |
| KePS | Total | | 49 | 3 | 0 | 0 | 0 | 0 | 0 | 0 | 49 | 3 |
| OTP | 1988 | Mestaruussarja | 25 | 0 | – | | – | | – | | 25 | 0 |
| OTP | 1989 | Mestaruussarja | 15 | 1 | – | | – | | – | | 15 | 1 |
| OTP | 1990 | Veikkausliiga | 7 | 0 | – | | – | | – | | 7 | 0 |
| OTP | Total | | 47 | 1 | 0 | 0 | 0 | 0 | 0 | 0 | 47 | 1 |
| Career total | | | 290 | 11 | 2 | 0 | 1 | 0 | 2 | 0 | 295 | 11 |

=== International ===
Appearances and goals by national team and year
| National team | Year | Apps | Goals |
|---|---|---|---|
| Finland | 1979 | 1 | 0 |
| Finland | 1980 | 8 | 0 |
| Finland | 1981 | 9 | 0 |
| Finland | 1982 | 6 | 0 |
| Finland | 1983 | 3 | 0 |
| Finland | 1984 | 3 | 0 |
| Finland | 1985 | 4 | 0 |
| Finland | 1986 | 6 | 0 |
| Finland | 1987 | 3 | 0 |
| Finland | 1988 | 5 | 0 |
| Finland | 1989 | 3 | 0 |
| Total | | 51 | 0 |

== Honours ==
OPS

- Mestaruussarja (2): 1979, 1980
