= Erkka Petäjä =

Finnish footballer (born 1964)

Personal information
- Full name: Erkka Petäjä
- Date of birth: 13 February 1964 (age 62)
- Place of birth: Turku, Finland
- Height: 1.79 m (5 ft 10 in)
- Position: Defender

Senior career*
| Years | Team | Apps | (Gls) |
| 1980–1984 | TPS | 86 | (3) |
| 1985–1991 | Öster | 143 | (3) |
| 1992 | Helsingborg | 8 | (0) |
| 1992–1993 | Malmö | 18 | (0) |
| 1993–1994 | Yverdon-Sport | 7 | (0) |
| 1994–1995 | Husqvarna | 33 | (4) |
| 1996–1997 | Inter Turku | 51 | (3) |
| Total | | 346 | (13) |

International career
| 1983–1994 | Finland | 84 | (0) |
- * Club domestic league appearances and goals

Erkka Petäjä (born 13 February 1964) is a Finnish former international footballer who earned 84 caps at international level between 1983 and 1994. Petäjä, who played as a defender, played professionally in Finland, Sweden and Switzerland for TPS, Östers IF, Helsingborgs IF, Malmö FF, Yverdon-Sport, Husqvarna FF and Inter Turku.

After his playing career, Petäjä moved back to Växjö, Sweden, where he currently resides.

== Career statistics ==
Appearances and goals by club, season and competition
| Club | Season | League | | | Europe | | Total | |
| Club | Season | Division | Apps | Goals | Apps | Goals | Apps | Goals |
|---|---|---|---|---|---|---|---|---|
| TPS | 1980 | Mestaruussarja | 3 | 0 | – | | 3 | 0 |
| TPS | 1981 | Mestaruussarja | 5 | 0 | – | | 5 | 0 |
| TPS | 1982 | Mestaruussarja | 25 | 0 | – | | 25 | 0 |
| TPS | 1983 | Mestaruussarja | 29 | 2 | – | | 29 | 2 |
| TPS | 1984 | Mestaruussarja | 24 | 1 | – | | 24 | 1 |
| TPS | Total | | 86 | 3 | 0 | 0 | 86 | 3 |
| Öster | 1985 | Allsvenskan | 21 | 0 | – | | 21 | 0 |
| Öster | 1986 | Allsvenskan | 22 | 0 | – | | 22 | 0 |
| Öster | 1987 | Allsvenskan | 20 | 0 | – | | 20 | 0 |
| Öster | 1988 | Allsvenskan | 20 | 2 | 4 (Note: Appearances in UEFA Cup and UEFA Intertoto Cup) | 1 | 24 | 3 |
| Öster | 1989 | Swedish Division 1 | 24 | 1 | – | | 24 | 1 |
| Öster | 1990 | Allsvenskan | 21 | 0 | – | | 21 | 0 |
| Öster | 1991 | Allsvenskan | 15 | 0 | 2 (Note: Appearances in UEFA Cup) | 0 | 17 | 0 |
| Öster | Total | | 143 | 3 | 6 | 1 | 149 | 4 |
| Helsingborg | 1992 | Swedish Division 1 | 8 | 0 | – | | 8 | 0 |
| Malmö FF | 1992 | Allsvenskan | 8 | 0 | – | | 8 | 0 |
| Malmö FF | 1993 | Allsvenskan | 10 | 0 | 1 (Note: Appearance(s) in UEFA Intertoto Cup) | 0 | 11 | 0 |
| Malmö FF | Total | | 18 | 0 | 1 | 0 | 19 | 0 |
| Yverdon Sport | 1993–94 | Swiss Nationalliga A | 7 | 0 | – | | 7 | 0 |
| Husqvarna | 1994 | Swedish Division 2 | 13 | 3 | – | | 13 | 3 |
| Husqvarna | 1995 | Swedish Division 2 | 20 | 1 | – | | 20 | 1 |
| Husqvarna | Total | | 33 | 4 | 0 | 0 | 33 | 4 |
| Inter Turku | 1996 | Veikkausliiga | 25 | 2 | – | | 25 | 2 |
| Inter Turku | 1997 | Veikkausliiga | 26 | 1 | – | | 26 | 1 |
| Inter Turku | Total | | 51 | 3 | 0 | 0 | 51 | 3 |
| Career total | | | 346 | 13 | 7 | 1 | 353 | 14 |
