= 1979 Mestaruussarja =

Mestaruussarja
- Season: 1979

Statistics of Mestaruussarja in the 1979 season.

== Overview ==
Preliminary Stage was contested by 12 teams, and higher 8 teams go into Championship Group. Lower 4 teams fought in promotion/relegation group with higher 4 teams of Ykkönen.

OPS Oulu won the championship.

== Preliminary stage ==
=== Table ===
Pos	Team	Pld	W	D	L	GF	GA	GD	Pts
1	OPS Oulu	22	11	10	1	39	15	+24	32
2	KuPS Kuopio	22	12	5	5	38	25	+13	29
3	HJK Helsinki	22	10	7	5	34	24	+10	27
4	Reipas Lahti	22	10	5	7	33	36	−3	25
5	KPT Kuopio	22	10	4	8	31	23	+8	24
6	TPS Turku	22	9	5	8	36	27	+9	23
7	Haka Valkeakoski	22	9	4	9	48	42	+6	22
8	KTP Kotka	22	8	4	10	27	44	−17	20
9	KPV Kokkola	22	5	7	10	25	27	−2	17
10	Ilves Tampere	22	6	4	12	31	41	−10	16
11	Pyrkivä Turku	22	5	6	11	17	31	−14	16
12	MiPK Mikkeli	22	4	5	13	23	47	−24	13

Source: rsssf.com

=== Results ===
Home \ Away	HAK	HJK	ILV	KPT	KPV	KTP	KPS	MPK	OPS	PYR	REI	TPS
FC Haka		0–2	3–2	2–1	3–0	5–1	1–3	8–1	1–1	3–3	4–1	2–3
HJK Helsinki	4–1		2–0	2–1	1–1	4–1	2–1	2–1	0–1	0–1	2–3	2–0
Ilves	2–3	0–2		3–3	1–0	5–1	3–1	3–1	2–1	1–1	1–2	1–0
KPT	5–2	0–1	3–0		0–0	0–2	1–2	2–1	1–1	2–0	2–1	2–0
KPV	0–0	2–2	1–1	0–1		5–0	1–2	3–0	2–3	0–2	3–1	2–1
KTP	2–1	5–2	3–2	1–0	1–0		2–0	2–3	0–2	1–1	3–2	0–0
KuPS	1–1	1–1	2–0	3–0	2–1	3–0		3–1	0–0	2–0	2–1	3–1
MiPK	2–4	0–0	5–0	0–3	0–0	1–0	1–2		1–1	0–0	1–1	0–1
OPS	3–0	1–1	2–1	0–0	3–0	0–0	1–1	3–0		5–0	4–1	1–0
Pyrkivä	2–4	2–0	1–0	0–2	0–2	0–0	1–0	3–4	0–0		0–2	0–1
Reipas	1–0	2–2	2–1	2–0	1–1	2–1	3–1	1–0	2–2	1–0		1–1
TPS	2–0	0–0	2–2	0–2	2–1	6–1	3–3	5–0	2–4	1–0	5–0	

Legend: Blue = home team win; Yellow = draw; Red = away team win.

== Championship group ==
=== Table ===
Pos	Team	Pld	W	D	L	GF	GA	GD	Pts
1	OPS Oulu (C)	29	15	11	3	53	25	+28	41
2	KuPS Kuopio	29	17	6	6	58	33	+25	40
3	HJK Helsinki	29	14	7	8	48	36	+12	35
4	KPT Kuopio	29	13	7	9	47	33	+14	33
5	Reipas Lahti	29	12	8	9	46	49	−3	32
6	Haka Valkeakoski	29	11	7	11	58	52	+6	29
7	TPS Turku	29	9	8	12	46	43	+3	26
8	KTP Kotka	29	9	4	16	33	68	−35	22

Source: rsssf.com
(C) Champions

=== Results ===
Home \ Away	HAK	HJK	KPT	KTP	KPS	OPS	REI	TPS
FC Haka				2–0		1–4		1–1
HJK Helsinki	2–1		2–5		0–2		0–1	
KPT	1–1			2–0	1–1			
KTP		2–6				0–1		2–1
KuPS	1–3			6–0		5–3		3–0
OPS		0–2	3–0				1–1	2–1
Reipas	1–1		0–4	6–2	1–2			
TPS		1–2	3–3				3–3	

Legend: Blue = home team win; Yellow = draw; Red = away team win.

== Promotion/relegation group ==
=== Table ===
Pos	Team	Pld	W	D	L	GF	GA	GD	BP	Pts
1	Ilves Tampere	7	4	3	0	16	5	+11	3	14
2	OTP Oulu (P)	7	5	0	2	18	11	+7	3	13
3	KPV Kokkola	7	2	3	2	9	11	−2	4	11
4	Sepsi-78 (P)	7	2	4	1	8	5	+3	2	10
5	Pyrkivä Turku (R)	7	2	3	2	9	8	+1	2	9
6	MP Mikkeli	7	2	0	5	7	11	−4	4	8
7	MiPK Mikkeli (R)	7	2	2	3	7	14	−7	1	7
8	GrIFK Kauniainen	7	1	1	5	11	20	−9	1	4

Source: rsssf.com
(P) Promoted; (R) Relegated

The teams obtained bonus points on the basis of their preliminary stage position.

=== Results ===
Home \ Away	GFK	ILV	KPV	MPK	MPM	OTP	PYR	S78
GrIFK					2–0	0–3	2–1	
Ilves	6–0			2–1			1–1	1–1
KPV	2–1	1–1		3–1				1–1
MiPK	2–2					4–5	1–2	
MP		0–3	2–0	1–2				3–0
OTP		1–2	4–1		2–1			0–1
Pyrkivä			1–1		2–0	2–3		
Sepsi-78	0–0			5–0			0–0	

Legend: Blue = home team win; Yellow = draw; Red = away team win.

== Attendances ==
No.	Club	Average
1	HJK	3,889
2	KuPS	3,079
3	OPS	2,352
4	KTP	2,331
5	Reipas	2,205
6	Koparit	2,174
7	Ilves	2,032
8	Haka	2,010
9	TPS	1,765
10	KPV	1,238
11	Pyrkivä	1,114
12	MiK	1,024
