= Didier Segers =

Belgian football player (born 1965)

Didier Segers (born 21 February 1965) is a Belgian former footballer who played as a defender or midfielder.

He spent his entire career playing in Belgium, featuring in the Belgian Pro League for Lierse, Antwerp, Mechelen and Lommel. With Antwerp, he played in the 1993 European Cup Winners' Cup final. After his career, he suffered from financial problems and alcoholism.

== Career ==
Segers was born in Berchem-Sainte-Agathe in the Brussels Capital Region and raised in nearby Molenbeek by his father. As a child, he felt that he was too overweight to be a footballer, so he ran and cycled to lose 10 kilograms. In 1984, he transferred from his local R.W.D. Molenbeek to K. Stade Leuven in the third division.

Segers moved to the second division club Lierse S.K. where he achieved promotion to the Belgian Pro League and a transfer to Royal Antwerp F.C. in 1992 for a fee of 35 million Belgian francs, roughly equivalent to €1 million. He and Francis Severeyns were the only two players signed by manager Walter Meeuws that summer, as he did not want to make changes to his squad. He contributed to the team finishing as runners-up in the 1992–93 European Cup Winners' Cup, with a goal in a 4–2 second round win away to FC Admira Wacker Mödling in Austria and marking Valery Karpin in a semi-final win over FC Spartak Moscow. He played in the final., a 3–1 loss to Parma AC at the original Wembley Stadium.

After the end of his Antwerp contract in 1994, Segers spent most of the rest of his career at K.V. Mechelen and Lommel S.K.. He never left Belgian football, but had an offer from Dutch club Willem II during his Lierse days, falling through due to a broken foot. In March 2003, Lommel forfeited with 11 games remaining due to bankruptcy, and their players were given permission to join new clubs; Segers joined Tempo Overijse of the fourth division but suffered a knee injury three minutes into his debut, and retired aged 38.

== Post-playing career ==
Segers never considered taking a coaching licence while he was still playing, when it would have been free. He could not afford the €10,000 fee for the licence once he retired. He worked for a newsagent, a post office and a pipe manufacturer.

After a divorce cost him financially and lost him the custody of his daughters, Segers suffered from alcoholism. Having been warned by his doctor that he had two years to live, he quit the addiction.

In 2010, Segers opened a café with his new wife, having worked in his grandparents' café as a child. He said in 2017 that he felt tempted to sell the business due to its exposure to alcohol. In 2023, he told Het Nieuwsblad that he had Attention deficit hyperactivity disorder and painful arthritis.
