= Noureddine Moukrim =

Moroccan footballer

Personal information
- Full name: Noureddine Moukrim
- Date of birth: 16 February 1966 (age 60)
- Place of birth: Khemisset, Morocco
- Position: Central defender

Senior career*
Years	Team	Apps	(Gls)
1985–1987	La Forestoise		
1987–1989	Tienen		
1989–1991	R.J. Bruxelles	53	(9)
1991–1995	Antwerp FC	31	(1)
1995–1996	R.J. Bruxelles		
1996–1997	Germania Teveren	10	(0)
1997–1999	RC Lebbeke		
1999–2001	Namur		
2001–2003	Tempo Overijse	51	(8)

International career
1992–1993	Morocco	3	(0)
- * Club domestic league appearances and goals

Noureddine Moukrim (born 16 February 1966) is a Moroccan footballer who played as a defender.

== Honours ==
Royal Antwerp

- Belgian Cup: 1991-92
- UEFA Cup Winners' Cup: 1992-93 (runners-up)
