= Sepsi =

Sepsi may refer to:

- László Sepsi (born 1986), Romanian footballer of Hungarian descent
- Sepsi-78, a football club from Seinäjoki, Finland
- ACS Sepsi SIC, a women's basketball club from Sfântu Gheorghe, Romania
- Sepsi OSK, a football club from Sfântu Gheorghe, Romania
