= Petäjä =

Petäjä, Petaja is a Finnish surname, it may mean Pinus sylvestris. Notable people with the surname include:

- Emil Petaja (1915–2000), American writer
- Erkka Petäjä (born 1964), Finnish footballer
- Tuuli Petäjä-Sirén (born 1983), Finnish windsurfer
