= Rudi Taeymans =

Belgian footballer

Rudi Taeymans (born 8 February 1967 in Merksem) is a former Belgian football defender who played as left-back, mainly for R Antwerp FC.

== Honours ==
Royal Antwerp

- Belgian Cup: 1991-92
- UEFA Cup Winners' Cup: 1992-93 (runners-up)
