= Royal Antwerp FC in European football =

Royal Antwerp Football Club, often simply referred to as R. Antwerp or simply Antwerp, is an association football club from Antwerp, Belgium. The team has participated in sixteen seasons of Union of European Football Associations (UEFA) club competitions, including one season in the European Cup, fourteen seasons in the Inter Cities Fairs Cup, UEFA Cup and Europa League, one season in the Cup Winners' Cup. The club's first appearance was in the 1957–58 European Cup. Since then, the club has participated in various seasons of the UEFA club competitions, with various success. Their best performance was reaching the final of the UEFA Cup Winners' Cup in 1993, where Antwerp lost 3–1 to Italian side Parma.

== Total statistics ==
As of home match with Barcelona.

Competition	S	Pld	W	D	L	GF	GA	GD
European Cup / UEFA Champions League	1	6	1	0	5	6	17	−11
UEFA Cup / UEFA Europa League	15	63	21	12	30	83	102	−19
UEFA Cup Winners' Cup	1	9	2	4	3	12	11	+1
Total	17	78	24	16	38	101	130	–29

== Statistics by country ==
As of 13 December 2023.

Country	Pld	W	D	L	GF	GA	GD
Austria	6	2	0	3	11	9	+2
Bulgaria	4	3	1	0	9	5	+4
Cyprus	2	1	0	1	4	4	0
Czech Republic	2	1	0	1	2	2	0
England	6	3	0	3	8	13	–5
France	2	0	1	1	4	5	–1
Germany	10	2	3	5	10	14	–4
Greece	4	3	0	1	5	3	+2
Hungary	2	0	1	1	1	3	–2
Italy	1	0	0	1	0	1	–1
Kosovo	2	1	1	0	2	0	+2
Luxembourg	2	2	0	0	2	0	+2
Netherlands	4	1	1	2	4	7	–3
Norway	2	2	0	0	5	1	+4
Poland	2	0	1	1	2	3	–1
Portugal	4	1	1	2	5	8	–3
Romania	2	0	2	0	1	1	0
Russia	2	1	1	0	3	2	+1
Scotland	6	1	1	4	13	20	–7
Spain	8	2	0	6	6	21	–15
Switzerland	2	2	0	0	8	3	+5
Northern Ireland	4	1	3	0	6	5	+1
Turkey	6	0	3	3	5	9	–4
Ukraine	2	0	0	2	2	4	–2
Total	85	27	18	41	111	142	–31

== Matches ==
Season	Competition	Round	Opponent	Home	Away	Aggregate
1957–58	European Cup	1R	(Spain) Real Madrid	1–2	0–6	1–8
1964–65	Inter-Cities Fairs Cup	1R	(Germany) Hertha BSC	2–0	1–2	3–2
1964–65	Inter-Cities Fairs Cup	2R	(Spain) Athletic Bilbao	0–1	0–2	0–3
1965–66	Inter-Cities Fairs Cup	1R	(Northern Ireland) Glentoran	1–0	3–3	4–3
1965–66	Inter-Cities Fairs Cup	2R	(Spain) Barcelona	2–1	0–2	2–3
1966–67	Inter-Cities Fairs Cup	1R	Union Luxembourg	1–0	1–0	2–0
1966–67	Inter-Cities Fairs Cup	2R	(Scotland) Kilmarnock	0–1	2–7	2–8
1967–68	Inter-Cities Fairs Cup	1R	(Turkey) Göztepe Izmir	1–2	0–0	1–2
1974–75	UEFA Cup	1R	(Austria) Sturm Graz	1–0	1–2	2–2 (a)
1974–75	UEFA Cup	2R	(Netherlands) Ajax	2–1	0–1	2–2 (a)
1975–76	UEFA Cup	1R	(England) Aston Villa	4–1	1–0	5–1
1975–76	UEFA Cup	2R	(Poland) Śląsk Wrocław	1–1	1–2	2–3
1983–84	UEFA Cup	1R	(Switzerland) Zürich	4–2	4–1	8–3
1983–84	UEFA Cup	2R	(France) Lens	2–3	2–2	4–5
1988–89	UEFA Cup	1R	(Germany) 1. FC Köln	2–4	1–2	3–6
1989–90	UEFA Cup	1R	(Bulgaria) Levski Sofia	4–3	0–0	4–3
1989–90	UEFA Cup	2R	(Scotland) Dundee United	4–0	2–3	6–3
1989–90	UEFA Cup	3R	(Germany) VfB Stuttgart	1–0	1–1	2–1
1989–90	UEFA Cup	QF	(Germany) 1. FC Köln	0–0	0–2	0–2
1990–91	UEFA Cup	1R	(Hungary) Ferencváros	0–0	1–3	1–3
1992–93	European Cup Winners' Cup	1R	(Northern Ireland) Glenavon	1–1	1–1	1–1
1992–93	European Cup Winners' Cup	2R	(Austria) Admira Wacker	3–4	4–2	7–6
1992–93	European Cup Winners' Cup	QF	(Romania) Steaua București	0–0	1–1	1–1 (a)
1992–93	European Cup Winners' Cup	SF	(Russia) Spartak Moscow	3–1	0–1	3–2
1992–93	European Cup Winners' Cup	F	(Italy) Parma	1–3		
1993–94	UEFA Cup	1R	(Portugal) Marítimo	2–0	2–2	4–2
1993–94	UEFA Cup	2R	Austria Salzburg	0–1	0–1	0–2
1994–95	UEFA Cup	1R	(England) Newcastle United	0–5	2–5	2–10
2019–20	UEFA Europa League	3Q	(Czech Republic) Viktoria Plzeň	1–0	1–2	2–2
2019–20	UEFA Europa League	PO	(Netherlands) AZ	1–1	1–4	2–5
2020–21	UEFA Europa League	Group J	(England) Tottenham Hotspur	1–0	0–2	2nd
2020–21	UEFA Europa League	Group J	(Austria) LASK	0–1	2–0	2nd
2020–21	UEFA Europa League	Group J	(Bulgaria) Ludogorets Razgrad	3–1	2–1	2nd
2020–21	UEFA Europa League	R32	(Scotland) Rangers	3–4	2–5	5–9
2021–22	UEFA Europa League	PO	(Cyprus) Omonia	2–0 (a.e.t.)	2–4	4–4 (3–2 p)
2021–22	UEFA Europa League	Group D	(Greece) Olympiacos	1–0	1–2	4th
2021–22	UEFA Europa League	Group D	(Germany) Eintracht Frankfurt	0–1	2–2	4th
2021–22	UEFA Europa League	Group D	(Turkey) Fenerbahçe	0–3	2–2	4th
2022–23	UEFA Europa Conference League	2Q	(Kosovo) Drita	0−0	2–0	2–0
2022–23	UEFA Europa Conference League	3Q	(Norway) Lillestrøm	2–0	3–1	5–1
2022–23	UEFA Europa Conference League	PO	(Turkey) İstanbul Başakşehir	1–3	1−1	2–4
2023–24	UEFA Champions League	PO	(Greece) AEK Athens	1–0	2–1	3–1
2023–24	UEFA Champions League	Group H	(Spain) Barcelona	3–2	0–5	4th
2023–24	UEFA Champions League	Group H	(Ukraine) Shakhtar Donetsk	2–3	0–1	4th
2023–24	UEFA Champions League	Group H	(Portugal) Porto	1–4	0–2	4th

=== Summary of best results ===
From the quarter-finals upwards:

UEFA Cup Winners' Cup (1):

- Runners-up in 1993.

UEFA Cup/UEFA Europa League:

- Quarter-finalists in 1990.
