= Parma Calcio 1913 in European football =

Italian club in European football

- Club: Parma Calcio 1913
- Seasons played: 15
- First entry: 1991–92 UEFA Cup
- Latest entry: 2006–07 UEFA Cup

Titles
- Europa League: 2: 1995; 1999
- Cup Winners' Cup: 1: 1993
- Super Cup: 1: 1993

Parma Calcio 1913 is an Italian football club based in Emilia-Romagna. The club was founded in 1913 (as Verdi F.B.C.) and has competed in the Italian football league system since 1919. Their first involvement in European competition – run by UEFA, the chief authority for football across Europe – was in 1991, entering the UEFA Cup. Since then, the club has competed in every UEFA-organised competition, with the exception of the now-defunct Intertoto Cup. The competition in which the club has had the most success is the UEFA Cup (now known as the UEFA Europa League); they have won two UEFA Cups, the first of which came in 1995 and the second in 1999. The club has also won the Cup Winners' Cup, which they won in 1993; and the Super Cup, also won in 1993.

== European club competition ==
The first continental competition organised by UEFA was the European Cup in 1955. It is the most prestigious European football competition and was conceived by Gabriel Hanot, the editor of L'Équipe, as a competition for winners of the European national football leagues. It was re-branded as the Champions league in 1992. The UEFA Cup Winners' Cup was inaugurated in 1960; it was for the winners of domestic cup competitions, but was discontinued in 1999. The Inter-Cities Fairs Cup was established in 1955. This was later the UEFA Cup when it came under the auspices of UEFA in 1971. It featured teams that had failed to qualify for the Cup Winners' Cup or European Cup. It took on domestic cup winners in 1999 when the Cup Winners' Cup became defunct. In 2009, it was renamed, becoming the Europa League. The European Super Cup was created in 1972 by Anton Witkamp, a reporter and later sports editor of Dutch newspaper De Telegraaf, but was only recognised by UEFA the following year. The UEFA Intertoto Cup was run by UEFA from 1995 and primarily served as a preliminary tournament for the UEFA Cup, but it was discontinued in 2008.

== History ==
=== Debut and successive finals (1991–1994) ===
Parma's debut European appearance came in 1991 after an impressive sixth place in their first season in Italy's top-flight after promotion the previous season, following AC Milan disqualifying in the famous night of the lights in Marseille. The club's first European tie was against CSKA Sofia, but it ended in disappointment and an away goals rule defeat. Disappointment turned to joy in the following season as the club lifted the Cup Winners' Cup, fired on by the goals of Faustino Asprilla and Alessandro Melli and negotiating ties against Újpest and Boavista before the Christmas break and Sparta Prague and Atlético Madrid in quarter-final and semi-final ties after it. The final at Wembley Stadium saw Parma faced with Belgian opponents Royal Antwerp, who were beaten 3–1 with the Italians' goals coming from Lorenzo Minotti, Melli and Stefano Cuoghi.

Parma won the European Super Cup a few months later, beating 1993 Champions League runners up Milan over two legs, after Marseille were disqualified from Europefor match fixing. The club then re-entered the Cup Winners' Cup the following year as holders, having failed to retain the Coppa Italia. Degerfors were easily beaten in the first round, but penalties were needed to see Maccabi Haifa off in the following round. Keenly-contested ties against Ajax and Benfica saw Parma through to a second consecutive final. However, the result did not go the Ducali's way in their first test against English opposition. Hosted at the Parken Stadium in Copenhagen, Alan Smith's goal for Arsenal halfway through the first half was enough to secure victory.

Season	Competition	Round	Opposition	Home	Away	Aggregate
1991–92	UEFA Cup	First round	(Bulgaria) CSKA Sofia	1–1	0–0	1–1 (a)
1992–93	Cup Winners' Cup	First round	(Hungary) Újpest	1–0	1–1	2–1
1992–93	Cup Winners' Cup	Second round	(Portugal) Boavista	0–0	2–0	2–0
1992–93	Cup Winners' Cup	Quarter-final	(Czechoslovakia) Sparta Prague	2–0	0–0	2–0
1992–93	Cup Winners' Cup	Semi-final	(Spain) Atlético Madrid	0–1	2–1	2–2 (a)
1992–93	Cup Winners' Cup	Final	(Belgium) Antwerp	3–1 (N)		
1993	European Super Cup	—	(Italy) A.C. Milan	0–1	2–0 (a.e.t.)	2–1
1993–94	Cup Winners' Cup	First round	(Sweden) Degerfors	2–0	2–1	4–1
1993–94	Cup Winners' Cup	Second round	(Israel) Maccabi Haifa	0–1	1–0	1–1 , 3–1 (p)
1993–94	Cup Winners' Cup	Quarter-final	(Netherlands) Ajax	2–0	0–0	2–0
1993–94	Cup Winners' Cup	Semi-final	(Portugal) Benfica	1–0	1–2	2–2 (a)
1993–94	Cup Winners' Cup	Final	(England) Arsenal	0–1 (N)		

=== UEFA Cup triumphs and the Champions League (1994–1999) ===
Parma incredibly managed a third consecutive European final appearance in 1995. This time the UEFA Cup was the target, and it was attacked with early victories over Vitesse Arnhem in a tight tie and AIK in more comfortable fashion. Close-run duels with Athletic Bilbao and Odense BK booked Parma a place in the semi-finals, where Bayer Leverkusen waited and were soundly beaten 5–1 on aggregate. The final was a two-legged affair against Juventus and Parma ran out 2–1 winners with ex-Juventus player Dino Baggio getting the winner. Non-descript campaigns in the Cup Winners' Cup and UEFA Cup followed as Parma were knocked out by Paris Saint-Germain in the quarter-finals and embarrassingly by Vitória de Guimarães in the first round, respectively.

An excellent finish in Serie A the summer of 1997 meant a first Champions League for Parma after Widzew Łódź were thumped in the qualifying round. Parma trailed only Borussia Dortmund in their group, but, with just two spaces up for grabs for the best second-placed teams, Parma's points tally was not quite enough to see them through in their only appearance in the Champions League group stages to date. The following year, 1999, was perhaps Parma's finest hour as a second UEFA Cup triumph was claimed. Difficult and close-run challenges against Fenerbahçe, Wisła Kraków and Rangers were overcome before Bordeaux were seen off with ease in the quarter-finals by seven goals to one, including a 6–0 thrashing in the return leg at home. Parma's place in the final never looked in doubt as they cruised past Atlético Madrid 5–2. The final was also a relatively comfortable affair. Marseille were soundly beaten by three goals to nil in the Luzhniki Stadium in Moscow to see Parma claim a fourth and final European trophy.

Season	Competition	Round	Opposition	Home	Away	Aggregate
1994–95	UEFA Cup	First round	(Netherlands) Vitesse Arnhem	2–0	0–1	2–1
1994–95	UEFA Cup	Second round	(Sweden) AIK	2–0	1–0	3–0
1994–95	UEFA Cup	Third round	(Spain) Athletic Bilbao	4–2	0–1	4–3
1994–95	UEFA Cup	Quarter-final	(Denmark) Odense	1–0	0–0	1–0
1994–95	UEFA Cup	Semi-final	(Germany) Bayer Leverkusen	3–0	2–1	5–1
1994–95	UEFA Cup	Final	(Italy) Juventus	1–0	1–1	2–1
1995–96	Cup Winners' Cup	First round	(Albania) KS Teuta	2–0	2–0	4–0
1995–96	Cup Winners' Cup	Second round	(Sweden) Halmstad	4–0	0–3	4–3
1995–96	Cup Winners' Cup	Quarter-finals	(France) Paris Saint-Germain	1–0	1–3	2–3
1996–97	UEFA Cup	First round	(Portugal) Vitória de Guimarães	2–1	0–2	2–3
1997–98	Champions League	Second qualifying round	(Poland) Widzew Łódź	4–0	3–1	7–1
1997–98	Champions League	Group A	(Czech Republic) Sparta Prague	2–2	0–0	2nd
1997–98	Champions League	Group A	(Turkey) Galatasaray	2–0	1–1	2nd
1997–98	Champions League	Group A	(Germany) Borussia Dortmund	1–0	0–2	2nd
1998–99	UEFA Cup	First round	(Turkey) Fenerbahçe	3–1	0–1	3–2
1998–99	UEFA Cup	Second round	(Poland) Wisła Kraków	2–1	1–1	3–2
1998–99	UEFA Cup	Third round	(Scotland) Rangers	3–1	1–1	4–2
1998–99	UEFA Cup	Quarter-finals	(France) Bordeaux	6–0	1–2	7–2
1998–99	UEFA Cup	Semi-finals	(Spain) Atlético Madrid	2–1	3–1	5–2
1998–99	UEFA Cup	Final	(France) Marseille	3–0 (N)		

=== Failure to re-create former glory (1999–2007) ===
Failure to qualify from the qualifying round of the Champions League in the Augusts of 1999 and 2001 after defeat from Rangers and Lille, respectively. On both occasions the club dropped into the UEFA Cup and fell at the Round of 16 stage. They also did so when they qualified directly for the competition in 2000–01 at the hands of PSV Eindhoven. Even less successful UEFA Cup campaigns followed as Parma were knocked out before Christmas at the hands of Wisła Kraków and Gençlerbirliği in 2002 and 2003.

Three cities have hosted a single round European final that Parma have participated in.

Despite an alarming dip in domestic form in the 2004–05 season, which was in no small part down to the financial and criminal troubles of the club's owners, Parma managed a creditable semi-final appearance in the UEFA Cup, where they were knocked out by eventual winners CSKA Moscow. The following year was the club's first absence from European competition after a staggering and unparalleled streak of fourteen years was ended by a poor league finish. To date the most recent appearance in Europe came the following season as Parma profited from Calciopoli to gain a UEFA Cup berth, where they were eliminated by Braga in the Round of 32.

Season	Competition	Round	Opposition	Home	Away	Aggregate
1999–2000	Champions League	Third qualifying round	(Scotland) Rangers	1–0	0–2	1–2
1999–2000	UEFA Cup					
1999–2000	UEFA Cup	First round	(Ukraine) Kryvbas Kryvyi Rih	3–2	3–0	6–2
1999–2000	UEFA Cup	Second round	(Sweden) Helsingborg	1–0	3–1	4–1
1999–2000	UEFA Cup	Third round	(Austria) Sturm Graz	2–1	3–3 (a.e.t.)	5–4
1999–2000	UEFA Cup	Fourth round	(Germany) Werder Bremen	1–0	1–3	2–3
2000–01	UEFA Cup					
2000–01	UEFA Cup	First round	(North Macedonia) Pobeda	2–0	4–0	6–0
2000–01	UEFA Cup	Second round	(Croatia) Dinamo Zagreb	2–0	0–1	2–1
2000–01	UEFA Cup	Third round	(Germany) 1860 Munich	2–2	2–0	4–2
2000–01	UEFA Cup	Fourth round	(Netherlands) PSV	3–2	1–2	4–4 (a)
2001–02	Champions League	Third qualifying round	(France) Lille	0–2	1–0	1–2
2001–02	UEFA Cup	First round	(Finland) HJK	1–0	2–0	3–0
2001–02	UEFA Cup	Second round	(Netherlands) Utrecht	0–0	3–1	3–1
2001–02	UEFA Cup	Third round	(Denmark) Brøndby	1–1	3–0	4–1
2001–02	UEFA Cup	Fourth round	(Israel) Hapoel Tel Aviv	1–2	0–0	1–2
2002–03	UEFA Cup	First round	(Russia) CSKA Moscow	3–2	1–1	4–3
2002–03	UEFA Cup	Second round	(Poland) Wisła Kraków	2–1	1–4 (a.e.t.)	3–5
2003–04	UEFA Cup	First round	(Ukraine) Metalurh Donetsk	3–0	1–1	4–1
2003–04	UEFA Cup	Second round	Austria Salzburg	5–0	4–0	9–0
2003–04	UEFA Cup	Round of 32	(Turkey) Gençlerbirliği	0–1	0–3	0–4
2004–05	UEFA Cup	First round	(Slovenia) Maribor	3–2	0–0	3–2
2004–05	UEFA Cup	Group B	(Spain) Athletic Bilbao	—N/a	0–2	3rd
2004–05	UEFA Cup	Group B	(Romania) Steaua București	1–0	—N/a	3rd
2004–05	UEFA Cup	Group B	(Belgium) Standard Liège	—N/a	1–2	3rd
2004–05	UEFA Cup	Group B	(Turkey) Beşiktaş	3–2	—N/a	3rd
2004–05	UEFA Cup	Round of 32	(Germany) Stuttgart	0–0	2–0	2–0
2004–05	UEFA Cup	Round of 16	(Spain) Sevilla	1–0	0–0	0–0
2004–05	UEFA Cup	Quarter-final	Austria Vienna	0–0	1–1	1–1 (a)
2004–05	UEFA Cup	Semi-final	(Russia) CSKA Moscow	0–0	0–3	0–3
2006–07	UEFA Cup	First round	(Russia) Rubin Kazan	1–0	1–0	2–0
2006–07	UEFA Cup	Group D	(Denmark) Odense	—N/a	2–1	1st
2006–07	UEFA Cup	Group D	(Netherlands) Heerenveen	2–1	—N/a	1st
2006–07	UEFA Cup	Group D	(France) Lens	—N/a	2–1	1st
2006–07	UEFA Cup	Group D	(Spain) Osasuna	0–3	—N/a	1st
2006–07	UEFA Cup	Round of 32	(Portugal) Braga	0–1	0–1	0–2

=== An unsuccessful return to Europe (2007–present) ===
The club has not competed in European competition since 2007.

After qualification for Europe on the final day of the 2013–14 Serie A season, Parma were set to compete in the 2014–15 UEFA Europa League, but were denied a UEFA licence and therefore entry into the competition as a result of late payment of roughly €300,000 of tax.

== Overall record ==
=== By competition ===
Competition	Pld	W	D	L	GF	GA	GD	Win% (Note: Win% is rounded to two decimal places.)
UEFA Champions League	12	6	3	3	15	10	+5	50.00
UEFA Cup Winners' Cup	24	14	4	6	30	15	+15	58.33
UEFA Cup	83	46	19	18	129	74	+55	55.42
UEFA Super Cup	2	1	0	1	2	1	+1	50.00
Total	121	67	26	28	176	100	+76	55.37

=== By country ===
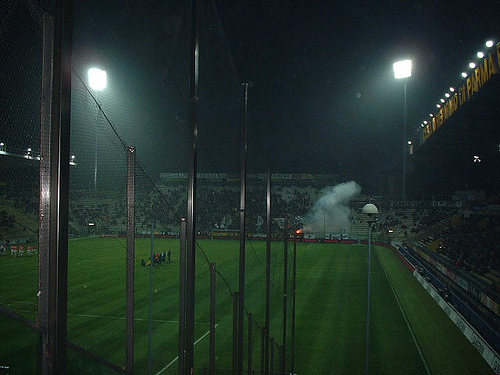
The view from the away fans section as Parma fans in the Curva Nord let off a flare during their European encounter with Dutch side Twente in 2001.

Country	Pld	W	D	L	GF	GA	GD	Win%
Albania	2	2	0	0	4	0	+4	100.00
Austria	6	3	3	0	15	5	+10	50.00
Belgium	2	1	0	1	4	3	+1	50.00
Bulgaria	2	0	2	0	1	1	+0	0.00
Croatia	2	1	0	1	2	1	+1	50.00
Czech Republic (Note: This record incorporates Parma's record against clubs from both Czechoslovakia and the Czech Republic.)	4	1	3	0	4	2	+2	25.00
Denmark	5	3	2	0	7	2	+5	60.00
England	1	0	0	1	0	1	−1	0.00
Finland	2	2	0	0	3	0	+3	100.00
France	8	5	0	3	15	8	+7	62.50
Germany	10	6	2	2	14	8	+6	60.00
Hungary	2	1	1	0	2	1	+1	50.00
Israel	4	1	1	2	2	3	−1	25.00
Italy	4	2	1	1	4	2	+2	50.00
Macedonia	2	2	0	0	6	0	+6	100.00
Netherlands	9	5	2	2	13	7	+6	55.56
Poland	6	4	1	1	13	8	+5	66.67
Portugal	8	3	1	4	6	7	−1	37.50
Romania	1	1	0	0	1	0	+1	100.00
Russia	6	3	2	1	6	6	+0	50.00
Scotland	4	2	1	1	5	4	+1	50.00
Slovenia	2	1	1	0	3	2	+1	50.00
Spain	10	5	1	4	12	12	+0	50.00
Sweden	8	7	0	1	15	5	+10	87.50
Turkey	7	3	1	3	9	9	+0	42.86
Ukraine	4	3	1	0	10	3	+7	75.00

== UEFA coefficient history ==
In European football, UEFA coefficients are used to rank and seed teams in club competitions. The coefficients are calculated by UEFA, who administer football within Europe. Teams are only ranked if they have competed in European competition in the last five years, so Parma's first five-year ranking coefficient was calculated in 1992 at the end Parma's first European adventure. Conversely, a failure to qualify for European competition between 2006 and 2011 saw Parma lose its ranking. Parma's rank and coefficient over the years:

Years	Rank	Coefficient
1988–1992	147th	1.000
1989–1993	64th	2.777
1990–1994	35th	4.332
1991–1995	12th	6.082
1992–1996	2nd	7.582
1993–1997	6th	7.582
1994–1998	8th	7.138
1995–1999	4th	87.606
1996–2000	10th	78.963
1997–2001	7th	81.119
1998–2002	7th	91.334
1999–2003	14th	90.155
2000–2004	21st	66.531
2001–2005	17th	72.191
2002–2006	21st	63.020
2003–2007	25th	61.808
2004–2008	34th	54.934
2005–2009	46th	40.582
2006–2010	92nd	22.867
2007–2011	Did not compete in European competition between 2007 and 2014.	
2008–2012	Did not compete in European competition between 2007 and 2014.	
2009–2013	Did not compete in European competition between 2007 and 2014.	
2010–2014	Did not compete in European competition between 2007 and 2014.	
2011–2015		
2012–2016		
2013–2017		
2014–2018		
