= 1987–88 Belgian First Division =

85th season of top-tier football in Belgium

Belgian First Division
- Season: 1987–88
- Champions: Club Brugge K.V.
- Relegated: KAA Gent; Racing Jet de Bruxelles
- Top goalscorer: Francis Severeyns (Royal Antwerp FC)

Statistics of Belgian League in season 1987–88.

== Overview ==
Location of teams in Belgian First Division 1987–88

It was contested by 18 teams. Club Brugge K.V. won the championship with 51 pts, KV Mechelen came a close second with 49, and Royal Antwerp FC came third, also with 49 pts. K.A.A. Gent & Racing Jet de Bruxelles were relegated.

== League standings ==
Pos	Team	Pld	W	D	L	GF	GA	GD	Pts	Qualification or relegation
1	Club Brugge K.V.	34	23	5	6	74	34	+40	51	Qualified for 1988–89 European Cup
2	KV Mechelen	34	21	7	6	50	24	+26	49	Qualified for 1988–89 European Cup Winners' Cup (Note: KV Mechelen qualified as 1987–88 European Cup Winners' Cup holders.)
3	Royal Antwerp FC	34	20	9	5	75	40	+35	49	Qualified for 1988–89 UEFA Cup
4	R.S.C. Anderlecht	34	18	9	7	64	27	+37	45	Qualified for 1988–89 European Cup Winners' Cup
5	R.F.C. de Liège	34	14	16	4	52	28	+24	44	Qualified for 1988–89 UEFA Cup
6	K.S.V. Waregem	34	16	7	11	50	43	+7	39	Qualified for 1988–89 UEFA Cup
7	Cercle Brugge K.S.V.	34	12	9	13	48	45	+3	33	
8	R. Charleroi S.C.	34	11	10	13	39	48	−9	32	
9	K.V. Kortrijk	34	11	9	14	40	54	−14	31	
10	Standard Liège	34	11	8	15	46	51	−5	30	
11	Sint-Truidense V.V.	34	10	9	15	30	39	−9	29	
12	R.W.D. Molenbeek	34	8	12	14	33	48	−15	28	
13	K. Beerschot V.A.C.	34	10	7	17	39	49	−10	27	
14	K.S.K. Beveren	34	8	11	15	36	38	−2	27	
15	KFC Winterslag	34	10	6	18	32	74	−42	26	
16	K.S.C. Lokeren Oost-Vlaanderen	34	9	8	17	42	47	−5	26	
17	K.A.A. Gent	34	8	9	17	34	60	−26	25	Relegated to Division II
18	Racing Jet de Bruxelles	34	7	7	20	21	56	−35	21	Relegated to Division II

== Results ==
Home \ Away	AND	ANT	BEE	BEV	CER	CLU	RJB	CHA	GNT	KOR	FCL	LOK	MAL	MOL	STV	STA	WAR	WIN
Anderlecht		6–0	1–2	4–1	2–0	1–1	1–0	1–0	6–1	2–0	0–0	3–2	3–2	2–0	0–1	1–2	5–1	4–0
Antwerp	2–0		2–1	1–1	5–2	2–0	7–2	0–2	0–0	3–0	0–0	3–2	3–0	4–0	3–1	3–0	2–0	5–0
Beerschot	0–3	0–2		0–1	1–1	1–1	2–0	1–1	2–0	0–1	1–4	2–2	0–1	0–0	2–0	6–2	1–0	4–1
Beveren	2–2	0–0	4–0		1–2	5–2	3–0	0–0	0–0	0–2	2–2	0–1	1–1	3–0	0–0	1–0	3–0	0–1
Cercle Brugge	0–0	1–2	0–1	1–0		0–2	2–0	3–1	4–2	0–0	3–1	0–1	0–0	2–2	2–0	1–1	4–0	3–1
Club Brugge	2–1	2–2	2–4	2–0	4–3		3–1	5–0	2–1	3–0	3–1	2–1	2–1	1–1	2–1	3–1	3–0	3–0
RJ Bruxelles	1–4	2–5	1–0	1–1	1–1	0–4		2–1	0–1	0–0	1–2	1–2	0–2	0–3	0–1	0–2	0–3	0–1
Charleroi	1–0	1–1	2–1	3–1	2–2	1–1	0–1		1–0	5–1	1–1	1–1	0–1	2–1	1–1	0–4	2–1	3–2
Gent	1–2	1–1	1–0	2–0	2–1	0–1	0–0	1–1		2–1	0–0	3–1	1–1	2–3	1–3	1–0	1–3	4–2
Kortrijk	1–1	2–4	3–0	3–2	2–1	0–2	1–1	2–4	0–0		1–1	2–0	2–5	0–1	2–2	1–0	2–1	2–1
Liége	0–0	5–0	1–1	1–0	4–1	0–2	0–0	4–2	4–1	2–0		3–0	0–0	4–0	1–0	2–2	1–1	0–0
Lokeren	0–0	1–1	2–1	0–0	0–1	0–1	0–2	1–0	8–1	2–2	0–1		0–1	2–1	2–1	2–2	1–2	6–0
Mechelen	3–0	2–0	2–0	1–0	3–2	2–4	2–0	1–0	1–0	2–0	0–1	2–1		3–0	3–0	2–1	0–0	4–1
Molenbeek	0–0	1–1	1–2	0–3	0–0	0–2	0–1	0–0	5–0	0–4	0–0	3–0	0–1		2–0	1–1	0–0	4–1
Sint-Truiden	1–1	0–2	0–0	1–0	0–2	2–1	1–0	0–1	1–0	1–2	1–1	1–0	0–0	1–2		1–1	1–2	2–1
Standard Liège	0–2	3–2	2–1	0–0	0–3	1–0	1–2	2–0	2–1	4–0	0–0	1–1	0–1	4–0	0–4		2–0	1–2
Waregem	0–3	1–2	3–1	4–1	3–0	1–0	0–0	3–0	1–1	2–1	5–3	1–0	2–0	1–1	1–0	3–2		5–0
Winterslag	0–3	1–5	2–1	1–0	1–0	0–6	0–1	2–0	3–2	0–0	0–2	2–0	0–0	1–1	1–1	4–2	0–0	

Legend: Blue = home team win; Yellow = draw; Red = away team win.

== Topscorers ==
Scorer	Goals	Team
(Belgium) Francis Severeyns	24	Royal Antwerp F.C.
(Belgium) Marc Degryse	22	Club Brugge K.V.
(Socialist Federal Republic of Yugoslavia) Nebojša Malbaša	21	R.F.C. de Liège
(Austria) Richard Niederbacher	18	K.S.V. Waregem
(Denmark) Kenneth Brylle Larsen	17	Club Brugge K.V.
(Netherlands) Piet den Boer	16	KV Mechelen
(Belgium) Marc Van Der Linden	14	Royal Antwerp F.C.
(Belgium) Alexandre Czerniatynski	14	Standard Liège
(Belgium) Luc Nilis	14	R.S.C. Anderlecht

== Attendances ==
No.	Club	Average
1	Anderlecht	16,471
2	Club Brugge	15,618
3	Charleroi	14,412
4	Antwerp	14,088
5	STVV	11,676
6	Liège	9,794
7	Standard	9,106
8	Mechelen	7,962
9	Gent	7,224
10	Beveren	6,647
11	Beerschot	6,500
12	Waregem	6,500
13	RWDM	6,029
14	Winterslag	5,941
15	Lokeren	5,794
16	Cercle Brugge	5,059
17	Kortrijk	4,941
18	Racing Jet	2,168
