= 1978 Mestaruussarja =

Mestaruussarja
- Season: 1978

Statistics of Mestaruussarja in the 1978 season.

== Overview ==
It was contested by 12 teams, and HJK Helsinki won the championship.

== League standings ==
Pos	Team	Pld	W	D	L	GF	GA	GD	Pts
1	HJK Helsinki (C)	22	13	7	2	52	29	+23	33
2	KPT Kuopio	22	12	8	2	35	15	+20	32
3	Haka Valkeakoski	22	12	7	3	42	19	+23	31
4	TPS Turku	22	12	2	8	57	29	+28	26
5	OPS Oulu	22	11	4	7	34	21	+13	26
6	MiPK Mikkeli	22	11	3	8	29	22	+7	25
7	KuPS Kuopio	22	9	3	10	33	31	+2	21
8	KPV Kokkola	22	8	5	9	26	31	−5	21
9	Reipas Lahti	22	5	9	8	20	35	−15	19
10	Pyrkivä Turku	22	4	9	9	14	28	−14	17
11	Kiffen Helsinki (R)	22	2	3	17	13	58	−45	7
12	OTP Oulu (R)	22	1	4	17	15	52	−37	6

Source: rsssf.com
(C) Champions; (R) Relegated

== Results ==
Home \ Away	HAK	HJK	KIF	KPT	KPV	KPS	MPK	OPS	OTP	PYR	REI	TPS
FC Haka		1–1	4–0	1–1	4–1	2–1	2–0	2–0	2–1	2–1	6–1	1–3
HJK Helsinki	2–2		4–1	1–3	1–0	0–0	0–4	2–0	6–3	4–0	4–1	6–5
Kiffen	0–0	1–3		0–6	1–2	0–1	2–5	0–2	2–3	1–1	0–2	0–1
KPT	2–1	0–0	3–0		1–1	0–4	4–1	0–0	2–0	0–0	0–0	1–0
KPV	0–0	1–2	2–0	1–1		4–2	0–1	1–4	1–0	1–0	0–0	3–0
KuPS	3–1	1–1	1–0	0–2	2–1		0–1	1–0	5–0	2–1	2–3	1–3
MiPK	0–2	0–1	4–1	0–2	2–0	4–1		0–2	1–0	0–0	1–1	1–0
OPS	0–1	2–2	6–0	0–1	4–1	2–1	1–1		2–1	0–1	2–0	2–0
OTP	1–3	2–4	0–0	0–3	0–1	0–3	0–1	1–2		1–1	0–0	1–2
Pyrkivä	0–0	0–4	1–3	2–2	0–3	1–0	0–1	4–1	0–0		0–3	0–0
Reipas	0–4	0–0	0–1	0–1	1–1	1–1	1–0	0–0	4–1	0–0		0–5
TPS	1–1	2–4	7–0	3–0	5–1	4–1	2–1	1–2	7–0	0–1	6–2	

Legend: Blue = home team win; Yellow = draw; Red = away team win.

== Attendances ==
No.	Club	Average
1	HJK	2,757
2	Haka	2,094
3	KuPS	2,087
4	Reipas	1,589
5	KPT	1,500
6	MiKi	1,172
7	TPS	1,129
8	OPS	1,092
9	KPV	1,015
10	KIF	935
11	Pyrkivä	903
12	OTP	668
