= Patrick Van Veirdeghem =

Belgian footballer (born 1963)

Personal information
- Full name: Patrick Van Veirdeghem
- Date of birth: 19 January 1963 (age 63)
- Place of birth: Lokeren, Belgium
- Height: 1.71 m (5 ft 7 in)
- Position: Central midfielder

Senior career*
Years	Team	Apps	(Gls)
1979–1989	Sporting Lokeren	-	(-)
1989-1993	FC Antwerp	71	(7)
1993-1996	KV Oostende	-	(-)
1996–1999	Standaard Wetteren	-	(-)
- * Club domestic league appearances and goals

Patrick Van Veirdeghem (Lokeren, 19 January 1963) is a former Belgian footballer who played as central midfielder.

== Honours ==
Royal Antwerp

- Belgian Cup: 1991-92
- UEFA Cup Winners' Cup: 1992-93 (runners-up)
