= Wim De Coninck =

Belgian footballer

Personal information
- Full name: Willem Aloïs Elodie De Coninck
- Date of birth: 23 June 1959 (age 67)
- Place of birth: Deinze, Belgium
- Position: Goalkeeper

Senior career*
Years	Team	Apps	(Gls)
1975–1987	Waregem		
1987–1993	FC Antwerp	118	(0)
1993–1996	AA Gent		
1996–1999	Anderlecht		
1999–2000	Eendracht Aalst		

Managerial career
- 2000–2001: Eendracht Aalst
- 2001–2002: Royal Antwerp F.C.
- * Club domestic league appearances and goals

Wim De Coninck (born 23 June 1959) is a retired Belgian footballer.

During his career he played for K.S.V. Waregem, Royal Antwerp F.C., K.A.A. Gent, and R.S.C. Anderlecht. He participated in UEFA Euro 1984, but did not earn any senior international caps in his career.

== Honours ==
=== Player ===
Waregem

- Belgian Cup: runner-up 1981–82
- Belgian Super Cup: 1982
- UEFA Cup: 1985–86 (semi-finals)
- Tournoi de Paris: 1985

Royal Antwerp

- Belgian Cup: 1991–92
- UEFA Cup Winners' Cup: runner-up 1992–93
