= 1982 Mestaruussarja =

Mestaruussarja
- Season: 1982

Statistics of (Finnish football) Mestaruussarja in the 1982 season.

== Overview ==
Preliminary Stage was contested by 12 teams, and higher 8 teams go into Championship Group. Lower 4 teams fought in promotion/relegation group with higher 4 teams of Ykkönen.

Kuusysi Lahti won the championship.

== Preliminary stage ==
=== Table ===
Pos	Team	Pld	W	D	L	GF	GA	GD	Pts
1	TPS Turku	22	11	7	4	48	20	+28	29
2	Koparit Kuopio	22	11	7	4	41	22	+19	29
3	Haka Valkeakoski	22	9	10	3	45	31	+14	28
4	Ilves Tampere	22	10	6	6	46	38	+8	26
5	HJK Helsinki	22	11	3	8	53	39	+14	25
6	Kuusysi Lahti	22	11	3	8	36	26	+10	25
7	KPV Kokkola	22	11	3	8	38	29	+9	25
8	KuPS Kuopio	22	8	5	9	24	41	−17	21
9	OPS Oulu	22	7	4	11	24	43	−19	18
10	Sepsi-78	22	6	5	11	33	44	−11	17
11	KTP Kotka	22	4	3	15	29	55	−26	11
12	Elo Kuopio	22	3	4	15	28	57	−29	10

Source: rsssf.com

=== Results ===
Home \ Away	ELO	HAK	HJK	ILV	KPT	KPV	KTP	KPS	KUU	OPS	S78	TPS
Elo		2–4	1–3	1–2	0–0	3–0	3–0	0–1	0–1	1–2	2–2	0–5
FC Haka	7–0		6–5	1–1	1–1	0–1	1–4	4–1	1–6	2–0	4–1	1–1
HJK Helsinki	4–1	2–2		4–2	1–1	6–2	6–1	4–1	2–1	4–0	6–2	2–3
Ilves	4–2	1–1	2–2		4–1	1–0	3–1	3–0	1–2	7–0	2–1	3–3
Koparit	2–0	3–3	2–0	2–1		0–0	2–0	3–1	1–1	0–2	3–0	3–0
KPV	4–1	1–1	3–0	6–0	1–0		3–1	1–2	1–0	4–1	0–2	3–1
KTP	2–2	0–1	0–1	6–2	1–6	2–1		4–0	1–2	0–2	1–1	1–1
KuPS	2–2	0–0	3–0	1–3	2–2	0–0	2–1		2–0	1–0	2–1	2–2
Kuusysi	1–2	0–1	1–0	3–4	2–1	3–1	6–1	2–0		3–1	2–1	0–0
OPS	4–2	0–0	1–0	0–0	2–3	1–2	2–1	3–0	0–0		1–5	0–3
Sepsi-78	4–3	0–3	0–1	0–0	0–4	2–4	3–1	0–1	3–0	2–2		3–2
TPS	3–0	1–1	4–0	1–0	0–1	2–0	5–0	6–0	2–0	3–0	0–0	

Legend: Blue = home team win; Yellow = draw; Red = away team win.

== Championship group ==
=== Table ===
Pos	Team	Pld	W	D	L	GF	GA	GD	Pts
1	Kuusysi Lahti (C)	29	16	4	9	49	30	+19	24
2	HJK Helsinki	29	15	4	10	62	47	+15	22
3	Haka Valkeakoski	29	12	12	5	54	40	+14	22
4	TPS Turku	29	14	7	8	64	32	+32	21
5	Koparit Kuopio	29	13	9	7	51	30	+21	21
6	KPV Kokkola	29	14	3	12	49	44	+5	19
7	Ilves Tampere	29	12	7	10	56	57	−1	18
8	KuPS Kuopio	29	9	8	12	31	51	−20	16

Source: rsssf.com
(C) Champions

The points were halved (rounded upwards in uneven cases) after the preliminary stage.

=== Results ===
Home \ Away	HAK	HJK	ILV	KPT	KPV	KPS	KUU	TPS
FC Haka			3–1	1–0		0–0	1–3	
HJK Helsinki	1–1			2–5		1–0		
Ilves		0–3			5–2		0–5	2–1
Koparit			1–1		2–0		1–2	0–1
KPV Kokkola	2–0	2–0				3–0		
KuPS			4–1	1–1			0–0	
Kuusysi		0–1			1–0			2–1
TPS	2–3	0–1			7–2	4–2		

Legend: Blue = home team win; Yellow = draw; Red = away team win.

== Promotion and relegation group ==
=== Table ===
Pos	Team	Pld	W	D	L	GF	GA	GD	BP	Pts
1	RoPS Rovaniemi (P)	7	6	0	1	12	4	+8	3	15
2	Reipas Lahti (P)	7	5	0	2	10	11	−1	4	14
3	KTP Kotka	7	5	1	1	16	6	+10	2	13
4	OPS Oulu	7	3	3	1	13	5	+8	4	13
5	MP Mikkeli	7	2	2	3	11	9	+2	2	8
6	Sepsi-78 (R)	7	1	2	4	10	14	−4	3	7
7	Elo Kuopio (R)	7	1	1	5	11	21	−10	1	4
8	FinnPa Helsinki	7	0	1	6	3	16	−13	1	2

Source: rsssf.com
(P) Promoted; (R) Relegated

The teams obtained bonus points on the basis of their preliminary stage position.

=== Results ===
Home \ Away	ELO	FPA	KTP	MP	OPS	REI	RPS	S78
Elo		3–0		3–3			0–3	
FinnPa			0–2		0–1	0–2		
KTP	7–2					2–1		4–1
MP		6–2	0–1		1–1			
OPS	3–1		0–0			6–0		1–1
Reipas	1–0			1–0			2–1	3–2
RoPS		1–0	2–0	1–0	2–1			
Sepsi-78	4–2	1–1		0–1			1–2	

Legend: Blue = home team win; Yellow = draw; Red = away team win.

== Attendances ==
No.	Club	Average
1	HJK	3,001
2	Ilves	2,554
3	Koparit	2,380
4	Kuusysi	2,171
5	KTP	2,044
6	Haka	1,911
7	KuPS	1,911
8	TPS	1,785
9	KPV	1,615
10	Sepsi	1,284
11	Elo	950
12	OPS	656
