= Nico Broeckaert =

Belgian footballer

Personal information
- Full name: Nico Broeckaert
- Date of birth: 23 November 1960 (age 65)
- Place of birth: Zottegem, Belgium
- Height: 1.86 m (6 ft 1 in)
- Position: Central defender

Senior career*
Years	Team	Apps	(Gls)
1979–1983	KSV Sottegem	-	(-)
1983–1989	KV Kortrijk	163	(7)
1989–1996	FC Antwerp	215	(9)
1996–1997	KSK Ronse	18	(1)
1997–1999	KSV Oudenaarde	-	(-)
Total		396	(17)

International career
1989	Belgium	2	(0)
- * Club domestic league appearances and goals

Nico Broeckaert (Zottegem, 23 November 1960) is a former Belgian footballer who played as central defender.

== Honours ==
Royal Antwerp

- Belgian Cup: 1991-92
- UEFA Cup Winners' Cup: 1992-93 (runners-up)
