= Ratko Svilar =

Serbian footballer (born 1950)

Personal information
- Date of birth: 6 May 1950 (age 76)
- Place of birth: Crvenka, FPR Yugoslavia
- Height: 1.83 m (6 ft 0 in)
- Position: Goalkeeper

Senior career*
| Years | Team | Apps | (Gls) |
| 1968–1973 | Crvenka | 41 | (0) |
| 1973–1980 | Vojvodina | 201 | (0) |
| 1978 | → Rochester Lancers (loan) | 16 | (0) |
| 1980–1996 | Antwerp | 243 | (0) |
| Total | | 501 | (0) |

International career
| 1976–1983 | Yugoslavia | 9 | (0) |

Managerial career
- 1995: Antwerp
- 1995–1996: Antwerp (assistant)
- 1996: Antwerp
- 1996–1998: Antwerp (assistant)
- 1998: Antwerp
- 1999–2000: Putte SK
- 2008–2009: Antwerp (assistant)
- 2009: Antwerp
- * Club domestic league appearances and goals

Ratko Svilar (Serbian Cyrillic: Ратко Свилар; born 6 May 1950) is a Serbian retired professional footballer who played as a goalkeeper.

He played for Antwerp for 16 years, he also coached the Belgian club on several occasions.

== Club career ==
Born in Crvenka, Socialist Federal Republic of Yugoslavia, Svilar joined Royal Antwerp F.C. in November 1980 from FK Vojvodina – he started his career with lowly hometown club FK Crvenka – and proceeded to endure a 16-year spell with the Belgian side, alternating between the posts and the bench; in the 1991–92 season, he contributed with 12 league appearances to help his team finish in fifth position, winning the Belgian Cup – his only piece of silverware – in the process.

Svilar retired from professional play aged 46, going on to have several coaching spells with his last and most important club.

== International career ==
Svilar represented Yugoslavia for seven years, and was a participant at the 1982 FIFA World Cup. He won his first cap on 25 September 1976, starting in a 3–0 away friendly loss to Italy.

== Personal life ==
Svilar's son Mile is also a goalkeeper, currently playing for Serie A club Roma.

== See also ==
- List of association football families
