= Ronny Van Rethy =

Belgian footballer

Rony Van Rethy
Personal information
- Date of birth: 21 November 1961 (age 64)
- Height: 1.83 m (6 ft 0 in)
- Position: Midfielder

Senior career*
Years	Team	Apps	(Gls)
1978–1985	Beringen		
1985–1996	R. Antwerp	238	(10)
1996–1997	Westerlo	32	(0)
1997–1999	Turnhout	62	(0)
1999–2000	Beringen	27	(1)

International career
- Belgium U21
- * Club domestic league appearances and goals

Ronny Van Rethy (21 November 1961) is a former Belgian footballer who mainly played as midfielder.

== Honours ==
Royal Antwerp

- Belgian Cup: 1991-92
- UEFA Cup Winners' Cup: 1992-93 (runners-up)
