= Rudi Smidts =

Belgian footballer

Personal information
- Full name: Rudolf Smidts
- Date of birth: 12 August 1963 (age 63)
- Place of birth: Deurne, Belgium
- Height: 1.78 m (5 ft 10 in)
- Position: Left wing back

Senior career*
Years	Team	Apps	(Gls)
1984–1997	FC Antwerp	425	(13)
1997–1998	Charleroi	31	(1)
1998–1999	Ekeren	32	(2)
1999–2000	Germinal Beerschot	29	(0)
2000–2002	Mechelen	42	(0)
2002–2003	Schoten	26	(0)
Total		585	(16)

International career
1992–1997	Belgium	33	(1)
- * Club domestic league appearances and goals

Rudolf "Rudi" Smidts (born 12 August 1963 in Deurne) is a former Belgian football defender.

== Club career ==
He played most of his career with FC Antwerp, the oldest club of Belgium.

== International career ==
Smidts made 33 appearances for the Belgium national football team and was in the squad for the 1994 World Cup, where he played four matches.

== Honours ==
Royal Antwerp

- Belgian Cup: 1991–92
- UEFA Cup Winners' Cup: 1992–93 (runners-up)
