= 1980 Mestaruussarja =

Mestaruussarja
- Season: 1980

Statistics of Mestaruussarja in the 1980 season.

== Overview ==
Preliminary Stage is performed in 12 teams, and higher 8 teams go into Championship Group. Lower 4 teams fought in promotion/relegation group with higher 4 teams of Ykkönen.

OPS Oulu won the championship.

== Preliminary stage ==
=== Table ===
Pos	Team	Pld	W	D	L	GF	GA	GD	Pts
1	OPS Oulu	22	13	8	1	49	15	+34	34
2	TPS Turku	22	12	7	3	38	17	+21	31
3	HJK Helsinki	22	12	6	4	39	22	+17	30
4	Haka Valkeakoski	22	13	4	5	41	30	+11	30
5	KTP Kotka	22	7	10	5	24	23	+1	24
6	Ilves Tampere	22	5	9	8	30	34	−4	19
7	Sepsi-78	22	7	5	10	36	48	−12	19
8	KuPS Kuopio	22	7	3	12	28	45	−17	17
9	OTP Oulu	22	6	4	12	24	47	−23	16
10	Reipas Lahti	22	5	5	12	27	32	−5	15
11	KPT Kuopio	22	5	5	12	29	36	−7	15
12	KPV Kokkola	22	2	10	10	20	36	−16	14

Source: rsssf.com

=== Results ===
Home \ Away	HAK	HJK	ILV	KPT	KPV	KTP	KPS	OPS	OTP	REI	S78	TPS
FC Haka		1–0	2–2	2–0	4–2	2–0	4–2	0–0	4–1	1–0	2–5	0–0
HJK Helsinki	1–1		4–2	2–2	2–0	1–1	4–1	1–0	3–0	0–5	6–0	1–2
Ilves	1–4	0–1		3–1	2–2	0–2	5–0	0–1	1–0	2–2	2–1	0–0
KPT	0–1	0–2	0–0		1–1	5–1	0–1	1–1	4–0	2–1	1–1	0–1
KPV	0–2	2–2	0–0	1–4		0–0	3–1	2–2	1–2	0–2	0–0	1–2
KTP	1–0	0–1	1–1	1–0	1–0		3–0	2–4	1–1	2–1	5–1	0–0
KuPS	2–3	0–1	5–1	3–1	1–1	0–0		0–5	4–1	1–0	1–3	2–1
OPS	4–0	0–0	2–1	6–0	1–1	3–0	1–0		3–0	4–1	6–2	1–1
OTP	5–2	1–1	1–3	0–4	3–1	0–0	2–3	0–1		1–3	2–1	1–0
Reipas	1–2	1–3	2–2	1–0	3–0	1–1	0–0	0–1	0–0		1–3	1–4
Sepsi-78	0–3	0–3	2–1	4–2	1–1	1–1	5–1	2–2	1–2	1–0		1–3
TPS	3–1	3–0	1–1	3–1	0–1	1–1	1–0	1–1	6–1	2–1	3–1	

Legend: Blue = home team win; Yellow = draw; Red = away team win.

== Championship group ==
=== Table ===
Pos	Team	Pld	W	D	L	GF	GA	GD	Pts
1	OPS Oulu (C)	29	15	13	1	70	30	+40	26
2	Haka Valkeakoski	29	16	8	5	57	37	+20	25
3	HJK Helsinki	29	15	9	5	48	29	+19	24
4	TPS Turku	29	14	10	5	48	29	+19	23
5	KTP Kotka	29	9	13	7	36	39	−3	19
6	Ilves Tampere	29	8	11	10	48	44	+4	18
7	Sepsi-78	29	9	5	15	47	67	−20	14
8	KuPS Kuopio	29	7	5	17	35	63	−28	11

Source: rsssf.com
(C) Champions

The points were halved (rounded upwards in uneven cases) after the preliminary stage.

=== Results ===
Home \ Away	HAK	HJK	ILV	KTP	KPS	OPS	S78	TPS
FC Haka				1–1	2–2		5–1	3–0
HJK Helsinki	1–1		3–2			2–2	1–0	
Ilves	1–3					2–2	6–0	
KTP		1–0	1–5			4–4		
KuPS		1–2	0–1	2–2				
OPS	1–1				7–2		3–2	2–2
Sepsi-78				1–2	2–0			5–2
TPS Turku		0–0	1–1	3–1	2–0			

Legend: Blue = home team win; Yellow = draw; Red = away team win.

== Promotion and relegation group ==
=== Table ===
Pos	Team	Pld	W	D	L	GF	GA	GD	BP	Pts
1	KPT Kuopio	7	3	3	1	12	7	+5	2	11
2	RoPS Rovaniemi (P)	7	3	2	2	14	11	+3	3	11
3	MP Mikkeli (P)	7	3	1	3	12	9	+3	4	11
4	MiPK Mikkeli (P)	7	4	1	2	14	12	+2	2	11
5	Kuusysi Lahti	7	3	2	2	16	10	+6	1	9
6	KPV Kokkola (R)	7	4	0	3	11	15	−4	1	9
7	OTP Oulu (R)	7	2	1	4	9	16	−7	4	9
8	Reipas Lahti (R)	7	1	0	6	14	22	−8	3	5

Source: rsssf.com
(P) Promoted; (R) Relegated

The teams obtained bonus points on the basis of their preliminary stage position.

=== Results ===
Home \ Away	KPV	KPT	KUU	MPK	MPM	OTP	REI	RPS
KPV				4–1	1–0	3–1		
KPT	1–2		1–1				4–1	
Kuusysi	4–0					4–0	3–2	
MiPK		1–1	3–2					2–1
MP		1–3	0–0	2–1				3–1
OTP		0–1		1–4	1–0			2–2
Reipas	6–0			1–2	2–6	2–4		
RoPS	2–1	1–1	4–2				3–0	

Legend: Blue = home team win; Yellow = draw; Red = away team win.

== Attendances ==
No.	Club	Average
1	KTP	2,980
2	HJK	2,930
3	Ilves	2,762
4	KuPS	2,177
5	Haka	2,055
6	OPS	2,036
7	Koparit	2,013
8	TPS	1,754
9	Sepsi	1,632
10	KPV	1,621
11	Reipas	1,565
12	OTP	1,253
