= 1981 Mestaruussarja =

Mestaruussarja
- Season: 1981

Statistics of Mestaruussarja in the 1981 season.

== Overview ==
Preliminary Stage is performed in 12 teams, and higher 8 teams go into Championship Group. Lower 4 teams fought in promotion/relegation group with higher 4 teams of Ykkönen.

HJK Helsinki won the championship.

== Preliminary stage ==
=== Table ===
Pos	Team	Pld	W	D	L	GF	GA	GD	Pts
1	KPT Kuopio	22	11	9	2	45	22	+23	31
2	HJK Helsinki	22	12	4	6	40	24	+16	28
3	TPS Turku	22	11	6	5	36	22	+14	28
4	Haka Valkeakoski	22	11	5	6	42	24	+18	27
5	KTP Kotka	22	11	4	7	33	26	+7	26
6	OPS Oulu	22	9	7	6	43	34	+9	25
7	Ilves Tampere	22	9	6	7	44	28	+16	24
8	KuPS Kuopio	22	10	3	9	34	37	−3	23
9	Sepsi-78	22	8	4	10	21	30	−9	20
10	RoPS Rovaniemi	22	5	3	14	27	44	−17	13
11	MP Mikkeli	22	4	3	15	17	50	−33	11
12	MiPK Mikkeli	22	2	4	16	22	63	−41	8

Source: rsssf.com

=== Results ===
Home \ Away	HAK	HJK	ILV	KPT	KTP	KPS	MPK	MPM	OPS	RPS	S78	TPS
FC Haka		0–2	1–1	0–0	1–1	3–0	2–0	3–0	2–0	5–0	1–0	1–2
HJK Helsinki	3–1		0–0	1–0	3–0	2–2	2–1	3–2	3–1	4–1	5–0	0–2
Ilves	5–2	0–2		1–1	2–0	1–0	4–2	3–0	5–0	1–1	4–0	1–2
KPT	2–2	3–1	0–0		6–0	4–1	3–1	4–2	2–2	2–0	3–2	1–1
KTP	1–1	2–1	4–0	1–2		4–1	2–0	2–0	0–0	2–0	2–2	3–1
KuPS	0–2	2–1	2–1	1–1	0–1		6–0	2–0	5–1	2–1	3–0	1–0
MiPK	0–3	2–4	1–5	1–1	0–3	0–2		2–3	2–3	2–0	1–1	1–1
MP	0–3	2–0	0–7	0–2	0–1	0–2	2–2		0–2	2–1	1–0	0–0
OPS	0–4	1–1	4–1	1–1	4–2	6–0	6–0	2–2		5–1	0–0	0–2
RoPS	2–3	0–2	4–1	1–2	1–0	1–1	7–1	2–0	0–2		2–1	0–2
Sepsi-78	3–1	2–0	1–0	2–1	1–0	3–0	0–2	2–1	0–2	0–0		0–1
TPS	2–1	0–0	1–1	1–4	0–2	5–1	3–1	5–0	1–1	4–2	0–1	

Legend: Blue = home team win; Yellow = draw; Red = away team win.

== Championship group ==
=== Table ===
Pos	Team	Pld	W	D	L	GF	GA	GD	Pts
1	HJK Helsinki (C)	29	17	5	7	57	32	+25	25
2	KPT Kuopio	29	13	12	4	56	28	+28	23
3	Haka Valkeakoski	29	15	6	8	54	34	+20	23
4	TPS Turku	29	13	10	6	46	27	+19	22
5	Ilves Tampere	29	12	7	10	59	46	+13	19
6	KTP Kotka	29	12	7	10	38	36	+2	18
7	KuPS Kuopio	29	11	7	11	46	50	−4	18
8	OPS Oulu	29	10	8	11	55	58	−3	16

Source: rsssf.com
(C) Champions

The points were halved (rounded upwards in uneven cases) after the preliminary stage.

=== Results ===
Home \ Away	HAK	HJK	ILV	KPT	KTP	KPS	OPS	TPS
FC Haka			2–0	0–2	2–0	2–2		
HJK Helsinki	1–3		4–3	1–0		6–0		
Ilves					4–1		5–4	0–5
KPT			1–1		1–2		5–0	0–0
KTP		0–1					1–1	0–0
KuPS			1–2	2–2	1–1			
OPS	4–1	1–3				0–6		
TPS	1–2	1–1				0–0	3–2	

Legend: Blue = home team win; Yellow = draw; Red = away team win.

== Promotion and relegation group ==
=== Table ===
Pos	Team	Pld	W	D	L	GF	GA	GD	BP	Pts
1	Kuusysi Lahti (P)	7	4	2	1	17	8	+9	4	14
2	Elo Kuopio (P)	7	5	1	1	12	4	+8	2	13
3	KPV Kokkola (P)	7	4	1	2	16	10	+6	3	12
4	Sepsi-78	7	3	2	2	16	11	+5	4	12
5	RoPS Rovaniemi (R)	7	4	1	2	16	13	+3	3	12
6	MP Mikkeli (R)	7	0	3	4	7	18	−11	2	5
7	Honka Espoo	7	1	1	5	7	16	−9	1	4
8	MiPK Mikkeli (R)	7	1	1	5	8	19	−11	1	4

Source: rsssf.com
(P) Promoted; (R) Relegated

The teams obtained bonus points on the basis of their preliminary stage position.

=== Results ===
Home \ Away	ELO	HON	KPV	KUU	MPM	MPK	RPS	S78
Elo			0–1				3–1	2–1
Honka	0–1		1–2					1–4
KPV				0–1	3–2	7–1	1–1	
Kuusysi Lahti	1–1	2–0			5–0	5–1		
MP	0–4	2–2						1–1
MiPK	0–1	0–1			1–1			
RoPS		5–2		5–2	2–1	2–1		
Sepsi-78			4–2	1–1		2–4	3–0	

Legend: Blue = home team win; Yellow = draw; Red = away team win.

== Attendances ==
No.	Club	Average
1	KTP	3,473
2	Koparit	3,306
3	RoPS	3,072
4	HJK	3,058
5	Ilves	2,766
6	KuPS	2,541
7	Haka	2,062
8	TPS	1,974
9	Sepsi	1,752
10	OPS	1,603
11	MiKi	1,404
12	MP	1,251
