= Geert Emmerechts =

Belgian association football player

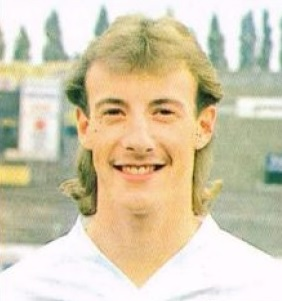
- Geert Emmerechts in 1988

Personal information
- Full name: Geert Emmerechts
- Date of birth: 5 May 1968 (age 58)
- Place of birth: Vilvoorde, Belgium
- Height: 1.85 m (6 ft 1 in)
- Position: Central defender

Youth career
- 1976–1979: FC Peutie
- 1979–1985: RWDM

Senior career*
Years	Team	Apps	(Gls)
1985–1988	RWDM	65	(0)
1988–2000	FC Antwerp	298	(5)
2000–2002	KSV Roeselare	51	(1)
2002–2003	KSK Hoboken	20	(1)
2003–2004	Kontich FC	0	(0)
Total		434	(7)

International career
1988	Belgium	1	(0)

Managerial career
- 2001–2002: Tubantia Borgerhout
- 2004–2005: Lierse SK (youth)
- 2005–2012: RSC Anderlecht (youth)
- 2012–2016: RSC Anderlecht (assistant)
- 2016: Legia Warsaw (assistant)
- 2017: Berchem Sport
- 2018–2020: Baniyas SC (U18)
- 2020–2022: Berchem Sport
- 2023–2024: Lierse (assistant)
- 2024: Lierse (caretaker)
- 2024–: Royal Antwerp (youth)
- * Club domestic league appearances and goals

Geert Emmerechts (born 5 May 1968) is a Belgian former professional footballer who played as central defender.

== Honours ==
Royal Antwerp

- Belgian Cup: 1991-92
- UEFA Cup Winners' Cup runner-up: 1992-93
