= Hans-Peter Lehnhoff =

German footballer

Personal information
- Date of birth: 12 July 1963 (age 63)
- Place of birth: Mariadorf, West Germany
- Height: 1.77 m (5 ft 10 in)
- Position: Midfielder

Team information
- Current team: Bayer Leverkusen (Team manager)

Youth career
- –1982: Alemannia Mariadorf
- 1982–1984: SV Baesweiler

Senior career*
Years	Team	Apps	(Gls)
1984–1987	1. FC Köln	98	(9)
1987–1994	Royal Antwerp	229	(61)
1994–2000	Bayer Leverkusen	139	(11)
1994–2000	Bayer Leverkusen II		
- * Club domestic league appearances and goals

Hans-Peter Lehnhoff (born 12 July 1963) is a German former professional footballer who played as a midfielder. Since 2000, he worked as a physiotherapist and team manager with Bayer 04 Leverkusen.

== Honours ==
1. FC Köln

- UEFA Cup: runner-up 1985–86

Royal Antwerp

- Belgian Cup: 1991–92
- UEFA Cup Winners' Cup: runner-up 1992–93

Bayer Leverkusen

- Bundesliga: runner-up 1996–97, 1998–99

Individual

- Man of the Season (Belgian First Division): 1992–93
