= Sepsi-78 =

Finnish football club

- Full name: Jalkapalloseura Sepsi-78
- Founded: 1930 SePS; 1978 Sepsi-78
- Ground: Seinäjoen ravirata Seinäjoki, Finland
- Capacity: 900
- League: Kutonen
| Home colours | Away colours |

Sepsi-78 is a Finnish association football club from Seinäjoki. The club was founded in 1978 after bankruptcy of its predecessor, Seinäjoen Palloseura (SePS). The first teams of Sepsi-78 and TP-Seinäjoki merged into Seinäjoen Jalkapallokerho (SJK) in 2007. Currently Sepsi-78 focuses in youth football and its first team plays in the Kutonen, seventh tier of the Finnish football league system.

== History ==
Seinäjoen Palloseura was founded in 1930. SePS had activity in football and bandy, which was the club's main sport in the beginning. SePS played seven seasons in the bandy top flight before 1966. The club also played football for 15 seasons in the second tier between 1945 and 1977.

In 1977, SePS went bankrupt, but Sepsi-78 was formed and the new club got its place in the Ykkönen. In 1979, Sepsi-78 finished third and was promoted to Mestaruussarja after finishing fourth in the promotion qualifiers. In the club's first top flight season, Sepsi-78 finished seventh. In 1981 season Sepsi-78 narrowly escaped relegation after a replay with RoPS. In 1982 Sepsi-78 was relegated to Division One. The club was relegated again next season and after that it remained in the third and fourth tier until 2007.

After 2007 season the first teams of Sepsi-78 and TP-Seinäjoki merged into Seinäjoen Jalkapallokerho, which got Sepsi-78's place in the Kakkonen.

== Season to season ==
Season to Season

| Season | Level | Division | Section | Administration | Position | Movements |
|---|---|---|---|---|---|---|
| 1945 | Tier 2 | Suomensarja (Second Division) | Group A | Finnish FA (Suomen Pallolitto) | 6th | |
| 1945-46 | Tier 3 | Maakuntasarja (Third Division) | Pohjanmaa | Finnish FA (Suomen Palloliitto) | 1st | Promotion Playoff - Promoted |
| 1946-47 | Tier 2 | Suomensarja (Second Division) | North Group | Finnish FA (Suomen Pallolitto) | 5th | |
| 1947-48 | Tier 2 | Suomensarja (Second Division) | North Group | Finnish FA (Suomen Pallolitto) | 7th | Relegated |
| 1948 | Tier 3 | Maakuntasarja (Third Division) | North Group B | Finnish FA (Suomen Palloliitto) | 3rd | |
| 1949 | | | | | | |
| 1950 | Tier 4 | Piirinsarja (District League) | North | Vaasa District (SPL Vaasa) | | Promotion Playoff - Promoted |
| 1951 | Tier 3 | Maakuntasarja (Third Division) | North Group B | Finnish FA (Suomen Palloliitto) | 5th | |
| 1952 | Tier 3 | Maakuntasarja (Third Division) | North Group B | Finnish FA (Suomen Palloliitto) | 3rd | |
| 1953 | Tier 3 | Maakuntasarja (Third Division) | North Group B | Finnish FA (Suomen Palloliitto) | 5th | |
| 1954 | Tier 3 | Maakuntasarja (Third Division) | North Group IV | Finnish FA (Suomen Palloliitto) | 6th | Relegated |
| 1955 | Tier 4 | Piirinsarja (District League) | | Vaasa District (SPL Vaasa) | | Promotion Playoff - Promoted |
| 1956 | Tier 3 | Maakuntasarja (Third Division) | North Group II | Finnish FA (Suomen Palloliitto) | 7th | Relegated |
| 1957 | Tier 4 | Aluesarja (Fourth Division) | Group 15 - Vaasa | Finnish FA (Suomen Palloliitto) | 2nd | |
| 1958 | Tier 4 | Aluesarja (Fourth Division) | Group 14 - Vaasa | Finnish FA (Suomen Palloliitto) | 2nd | |
| 1959 | Tier 4 | Aluesarja (Fourth Division) | Group 15 - Vaasa | Finnish FA (Suomen Palloliitto) | 1st | Promoted |
| 1960 | Tier 3 | Maakuntasarja (Third Division) | Group 8 | Finnish FA (Suomen Palloliitto) | 3rd | |
| 1961 | Tier 3 | Maakuntasarja (Third Division) | Group 8 | Finnish FA (Suomen Palloliitto) | 1st | Promoted |
| 1962 | Tier 2 | Suomensarja (Second Division) | North Group | Finnish FA (Suomen Pallolitto) | 9th | |
| 1963 | Tier 2 | Suomensarja (Second Division) | North Group | Finnish FA (Suomen Pallolitto) | 4th | |
| 1964 | Tier 2 | Suomensarja (Second Division) | North Group | Finnish FA (Suomen Pallolitto) | 4th | |
| 1965 | Tier 2 | Suomensarja (Second Division) | North Group | Finnish FA (Suomen Pallolitto) | 6th | |
| 1966 | Tier 2 | Suomensarja (Second Division) | North Group | Finnish FA (Suomen Pallolitto) | 9th | |
| 1967 | Tier 2 | Suomensarja (Second Division) | North Group | Finnish FA (Suomen Pallolitto) | 11th | Relegated |
| 1968 | Tier 3 | Maakuntasarja (Third Division) | Group 7 | Finnish FA (Suomen Palloliitto) | 4th | |
| 1969 | Tier 3 | Maakuntasarja (Third Division) | Group 7 | Finnish FA (Suomen Palloliitto) | 2nd | |
| 1970 | Tier 3 | III Divisioona (Third Division) | Group 7 | Finnish FA (Suomen Palloliitto) | 2nd | |
| 1971 | Tier 3 | III Divisioona (Third Division) | Group 7 | Finnish FA (Suomen Palloliitto) | 1st | Promoted |
| 1972 | Tier 2 | II Divisioona (Second Division) | West Group | Finnish FA (Suomen Pallolitto) | 3rd | |
| 1973 | Tier 2 | I Divisioona (First Division) | | Finnish FA (Suomen Pallolitto) | 6th | |
| 1974 | Tier 2 | I Divisioona (First Division) | | Finnish FA (Suomen Pallolitto) | 3rd | |
| 1975 | Tier 2 | I Divisioona (First Division) | | Finnish FA (Suomen Pallolitto) | 6th | |
| 1976 | Tier 2 | I Divisioona (First Division) | | Finnish FA (Suomen Pallolitto) | 3rd | |
| 1977 | Tier 2 | I Divisioona (First Division) | | Finnish FA (Suomen Pallolitto) | 7th | |
| 1978 | Tier 2 | I Divisioona (First Division) | | Finnish FA (Suomen Pallolitto) | 3rd | |
| 1979 | Tier 2 | I Divisioona (First Division) | | Finnish FA (Suomen Pallolitto) | 3rd | Promotion Group 4th - Promoted |
| 1980 | Tier 1 | SM-Sarja (Premier League) | | Finnish FA (Suomen Palloliitto) | 7th | Championship Group 7th |
| 1981 | Tier 1 | SM-Sarja (Premier League) | | Finnish FA (Suomen Palloliitto) | 9th | Relegation Group 4th |
| 1982 | Tier 1 | SM-Sarja (Premier League) | | Finnish FA (Suomen Palloliitto) | 10th | Relegation Group 6th - Relegated |
| 1983 | Tier 2 | I Divisioona (First Division) | | Finnish FA (Suomen Pallolitto) | 10th | Relegation Group 8th - Relegated |
| 1984 | Tier 3 | II Divisioona (Second Division) | North Group | Finnish FA (Suomen Palloliitto) | 9th | |
| 1985 | Tier 3 | II Divisioona (Second Division) | North Group | Finnish FA (Suomen Palloliitto) | 6th | |
| 1986 | Tier 3 | II Divisioona (Second Division) | North Group | Finnish FA (Suomen Palloliitto) | 9th | |
| 1987 | Tier 3 | II Divisioona (Second Division) | North Group | Finnish FA (Suomen Palloliitto) | 12th | Relegated |
| 1988 | Tier 4 | III Divisioona (Third Division) | Group 8 - Central Ostrobothnia & Vaasa | Finnish FA (Suomen Palloliitto) | 5th | |
| 1989 | Tier 4 | III Divisioona (Third Division) | Group 5 - Tampere & Central Finland | Finnish FA (Suomen Palloliitto) | 5th | |
| 1990 | Tier 4 | III Divisioona (Third Division) | Group 8 - Central Ostrobothnia & Vaasa | Finnish FA (Suomen Palloliitto) | 1st | Promoted |
| 1991 | Tier 3 | II Divisioona (Second Division) | North Group | Finnish FA (Suomen Palloliitto) | 6th | |
| 1992 | Tier 3 | II Divisioona (Second Division) | North Group | Finnish FA (Suomen Palloliitto) | 11th' | Relegated |
| 1993 | Tier 4 | Kolmonen (Third Division) | Group 8 - Central Ostrobothnia & Vaasa | Finnish FA (Suomen Palloliitto) | 1st | Promoted |
| 1994 | Tier 3 | Kakkonen (Second Division) | North Group | Finnish FA (Suomen Palloliitto) | 8th | |
| 1995 | Tier 3 | Kakkonen (Second Division) | West Group | Finnish FA (Suomen Palloliitto) | 7th | |
| 1996 | Tier 3 | Kakkonen (Second Division) | North Group | Finnish FA (Suomen Palloliitto) | 7th | |
| 1997 | Tier 3 | Kakkonen (Second Division) | West Group | Finnish FA (Suomen Palloliitto) | 10th | Relegation Playoff |
| 1998 | Tier 3 | Kakkonen (Second Division) | West Group | Finnish FA (Suomen Palloliitto) | 12th | Relegated |
| 1999 | Tier 4 | Kolmonen (Third Division) | Group 7 - Central Ostrobothnia & Vaasa | Vaasa District (SPL Vaasa) | 8th | |
| 2000 | Tier 4 | Kolmonen (Third Division) | Vaasa | Vaasa District (SPL Vaasa) | 1st | Promoted |
| 2001 | Tier 3 | Kakkonen (Second Division) | North Group | Finnish FA (Suomen Palloliitto) | 7th | |
| 2002 | Tier 3 | Kakkonen (Second Division) | North Group | Finnish FA (Suomen Palloliitto) | 12th | Relegated |
| 2003 | Tier 4 | Kolmonen (Third Division) | Vaasa | Vaasa District (SPL Vaasa) | 11th | Relegation Group 10th |
| 2004 | Tier 4 | Kolmonen (Third Division) | Vaasa | Vaasa District (SPL Vaasa) | 4th | Promotion Group 3rd - Promotion Group North 2nd - Promoted |
| 2005 | Tier 3 | Kakkonen (Second Division) | West Group | Finnish FA (Suomen Palloliitto) | 8th | |
| 2006 | Tier 3 | Kakkonen (Second Division) | Group c | Finnish FA (Suomen Palloliitto) | 8th | |
| 2007 | Tier 3 | Kakkonen (Second Division) | Group C | Finnish FA (Suomen Palloliitto) | 10th | |
| 2008 | Tier 6 | Vitonen (Fifth Division) | | Vaasa District (SPL Vaasa) | 10th | Relegated |
| 2008 | Tier 7 | Kutonen (Sixth Division) | | Vaasa District (SPL Vaasa) | 9th | |
| 2009 | Tier 7 | Kutonen (Sixth Division) | Group 3 | Vaasa District (SPL Vaasa) | 2nd | |
| 2010 | Tier 7 | Kutonen (Sixth Division) | Group 3 | Vaasa District (SPL Vaasa) | 3rd | Promotion Group 8th |
| 2011 | Tier 7 | Kutonen (Sixth Division) | Group 3 | Vaasa District (SPL Vaasa) | 7th | |
| 2012 | Did not participate | | | | | |
| 2013 | Tier 7 | Kutonen (Sixth Division) | Group 3 | Vaasa District (SPL Vaasa) | 8th | Lower Group 8th |
| 2014-17 | Did not participate | | | | | |
| 2018 | Tier 7 | Kutonen (Sixth Division) | Group 2 | Vaasa District (SPL Vaasa) | 4th | Promotion Group 2nd |
| 2019 | Tier 6 | Vitonen (Fifth Division) | | Vaasa District (SPL Vaasa) | 11th | Relegated |

- 3 seasons in Veikkausliiga
- 18 seasons in Ykkönen
- 29 seasons in Kakkonen
- 13 seasons in Kolmonen
- 2 seasons in Vitonen
- 6 seasons in Kutonen
