= Francis Severeyns =

Belgian footballer

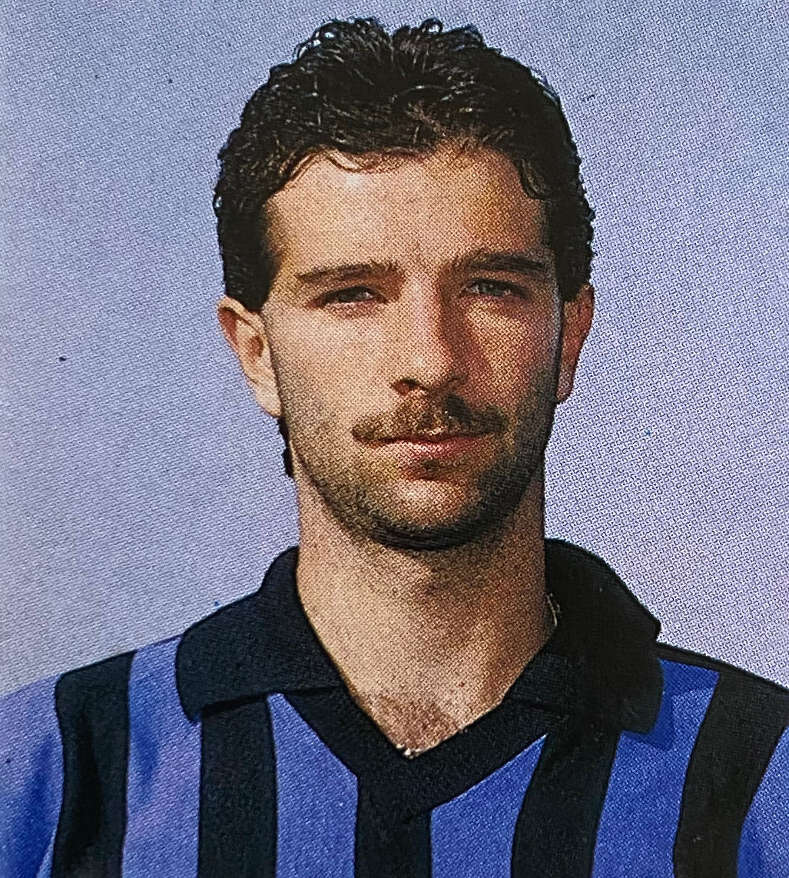
- Severeyns with Pisa in 1988

Personal information
- Date of birth: 8 January 1968 (age 58)
- Place of birth: Westmalle, Belgium
- Height: 1.78 m (5 ft 10 in)
- Position: Striker

Youth career
- 1975–1982: KV Westmalle
- 1982–1984: Royal Antwerp

Senior career*
Years	Team	Apps	(Gls)
1984–1988	Royal Antwerp	76	(33)
1988–1989	Pisa	26	(0)
1989–1992	K.V. Mechelen	68	(21)
1992–1997	Royal Antwerp	148	(69)
1997–1998	Tirol Innsbruck	36	(11)
1998–2001	Germinal Beerschot	55	(21)
2001–2002	K.V.C. Westerlo	22	(5)
2002–2007	Royal Cappellen	138	(74)
2007–2008	KFC Sint-Lenaarts	25	(14)
2009–2012	Gooreind VV		
2012–2013	FC De Kempen		
2013–2015	KV Westmalle		

International career
1988–1993	Belgium	7	(1)
- * Club domestic league appearances and goals

Francis Severeyns (born 8 January 1968 in Westmalle), nicknamed Cisse, is a Belgian former professional footballer who played as a striker for Royal Antwerp, Pisa S.C., KV Mechelen, FC Tirol Innsbruck and K.F.C. Germinal Beerschot. He was the Jupiler League top scorer in 1988 with 24 goals. He played seven matches for the Belgium national team. Whilst at Antwerp he helped them to the 1993 European Cup Winners' Cup final, in which he scored to tie the game at 1–1, although they went on to lose 3–1 to Parma.

He also played for Royal Cappellen in the Third division A. Aged 47, the striker ended his career in 2015 with KV Westmalle, in the Belgian Provincial leagues.

== Honours ==
KV Mechelen

- Amsterdam Tournament: 1989
- Jules Pappaert Cup: 1990
- Belgian Cup: 1990–91 (finalists), 1991–92 (finalists)

Antwerp

- UEFA Cup Winners' Cup: runner-up 1992–93

Individual

- Belgian Young Professional Footballer of the Year: 1987–88
- Belgian First Division top scorer: 1987–88 (24 goals)
