= Willy Vincent =

Mauritian former footballer

Personal information
- Full name: Willy Jozef Vincent
- Date of birth: 18 November 1966 (age 59)
- Place of birth: Mauritius
- Height: 1.70 m (5 ft 7 in)
- Position: Forward

Senior career*
Years	Team	Apps	(Gls)
1987–1991	Fire Brigade		
1991–1998	Antwerp	44	(4)
1994–1995	→ Hapoel Beit She'an	15	(1)
1998	Hapoel Beit She'an	3	(0)
1997–2000	Berchem		
2000–2003	KVO Aarschot		
2003–2004	KFC Schoten SK		

International career
1987–1993	Mauritius	19	(3)
- * Club domestic league appearances and goals

Willy Jozef Vincent (born 18 November 1966) is a Mauritian former footballer who is last known to have played as a forward for KFC Schoten SK. Besides Mauritius, he has played in Belgium.

== Career ==
Vincent started his career with Mauritian side Fire Brigade. Before the second half of 1991–92, Vincent signed for Antwerp in the Belgian top flight, where he made 46 appearances and scored 4 goals, helping them win the 1991–92 Belgian Cup. On 14 February 1992, he debuted for Antwerp during a 2–8 loss to Beerschot. On 14 February 1992, Vincent scored his first goal for Antwerp during a 2–8 loss to Beerschot. After that, Vincent signed for KFC Schoten SK in the Belgian fifth tier.
