= 1991–92 Belgian Cup =

Tournament details
- Country: Belgium

Final positions
- Champions: Antwerp
- Runners-up: KV Mechelen

Tournament statistics
- Top goal scorer: Alex Czerniatynski (5 goals)

The 1991–92 Belgian Cup was the 37th season of the main knockout competition in Belgian association football, the Belgian Cup.

== Final rounds ==
The final phase started when all clubs from the top two divisions in Belgian football entered the competition in the round of 64 (18 clubs from first division, 16 clubs from second division and 30 clubs from the qualifications). The first 3 rounds were played in one leg, while the next 2 rounds (quarter-finals and semifinals) were played in two legs. The final game was played at the Olympiastadion in Bruges and won by Antwerp against KV Mechelen.

=== Bracket ===
1st Round
Gent	3
Francs Borains	1
Harelbeke	3
Menen	1
Sint-Truidense	2
Mons	0
Evergem Center	0
Anderlecht	4
Mouscron	0
Kortrijk	2
Sint-Niklase	4
US Namur	0
Molenbeek	4
Berchem Sport	0
Genk	3
Deinze	0
Wervik	1
Lommel	3
Turnhout	1(6)
Tilleur	1(7)
K.F.C. Herentals	0
Waregem	4
Izegem	1
Patro Eisden	0
Wavre	0
Saint-Gilloise	1
Mol	0
Antwerp	3
Tienen	1(4)
Boom	1(2)
Cappellen	2
Lierse	1
Andenne	1
Beveren	2
Sérésien	4
Zwarte Leeuw	0
Diest	5
Hoeselt	0
Geel	3
Poederlee	0
Stade Leuven	0
Ekeren	5
FC Liège	4
Lyra	0
ROC Charleroi	2*
R Charleroi SC	1
KV Mechelen	3
Brainois	0
Beerschot	4
Denderleeuw	1
Eeklo	1
Oostende	3*
Tongeren	0(4)
KRC Mechelen	0(2)
Hoogstraten	1
Aalst	7
Dessel Sport	0
Club Brugge	2
Lokeren	3
Marchiennoise	1
Standard Liège	3
Wetteren	1
KSK Roeselare	1
Cercle Brugge	2

2nd Round
Gent	4
Harelbeke	1
Sint-Truidense	1(5)
Anderlecht	1(4)
Kortrijk	1
Sint-Niklase	2
Molenbeek	3
Genk	0
Lommel	4
Tilleur	1
Waregem	2
Izegem	1
Saint-Gilloise	0
Antwerp	1
Tienen	2(5)
Cappellen	2(4)
Beveren	3*
Sérésien	2
Diest	1(4)
Geel	1(5)
Ekeren	0
FC Liège	1
ROC Charleroi	0
KV Mechelen	3
Beerschot	1
Oostende	0
Tongeren	1
Aalst	3
Club Brugge	2*
Lokeren	0
Standard Liège	3
Cercle Brugge	1

3rd Round
Gent	1
Sint-Truidense	0
Sint-Niklase	3*
Molenbeek	1
Lommel	2
Waregem	0
Antwerp	1
Tienen	0
Beveren	3
Geel	0
FC Liège	1
KV Mechelen	2*
Beerschot	0
Aalst	2
Club Brugge	0
Standard Liège	1

Quarterfinals
Gent	2	2
Sint-Niklase	1	0
Lommel	1	0
Antwerp	0	2
Beveren	0	1
KV Mechelen	0	2
Aalst	0	1
Standard Liège	1	5

Semifinals
Gent	1	0
Antwerp	1	1
KV Mechelen	1	2
Standard Liège	1	0

Finals
Antwerp	2(9)
KV Mechelen	2(8)

* after extra time

=== Final ===
7 June 1992
16:00 CET

Antwerp	2–2 (a.e.t.)	KV Mechelen
Kiekens 72'; Czerniatynski 117'	Report	Arambasic 88'; Eijkelkamp 95'
Penalties
Vincent (penalty missed); Broeckaert (penalty scored); Van Rethy (penalty missed); Kiekens (penalty scored); Lehnhoff (penalty scored); Smidts (penalty scored); Ukkonen (penalty scored); Czerniatynski (penalty scored); Jakovljević (penalty scored); Emmerechts (penalty scored); Svilar (penalty scored)	9–8	(penalty scored) Preud'homme; (penalty missed) Eijkelkamp; (penalty scored) Versavel; (penalty missed) Emmers; (penalty scored) Albert; (penalty scored) Bartholomeeusen; (penalty scored) Bogers; (penalty scored) Arambasic; (penalty scored) Severeyns; (penalty scored) Gijsbrechts; (penalty missed) Clijsters

Olympiastadion, Bruges
Attendance: 20,000
Referee: Alphonse Constantin
