= Wim Kiekens =

Belgian footballer (born 1968)

Personal information
- Date of birth: 28 February 1963 (age 63)
- Place of birth: Aalst, Belgium
- Height: 1.83 m (6 ft 0 in)
- Position: Wing-back

Senior career*
Years	Team	Apps	(Gls)
1987–1990	RWD Molenbeek	74	(3)
1990–1998	FC Antwerp	260	(12)
1998–2001	Fortuna Sittard	36	(1)
Total		370	(16)
- * Club domestic league appearances and goals

Wim Kiekens (26 February 1968) is a Belgian former professional footballer who played as a wing-back.

== Honours ==
Royal Antwerp

- Belgian Cup: 1991–92
- UEFA Cup Winners' Cup runner-up: 1992–93
