= René Eijkelkamp =

Dutch footballer and coach

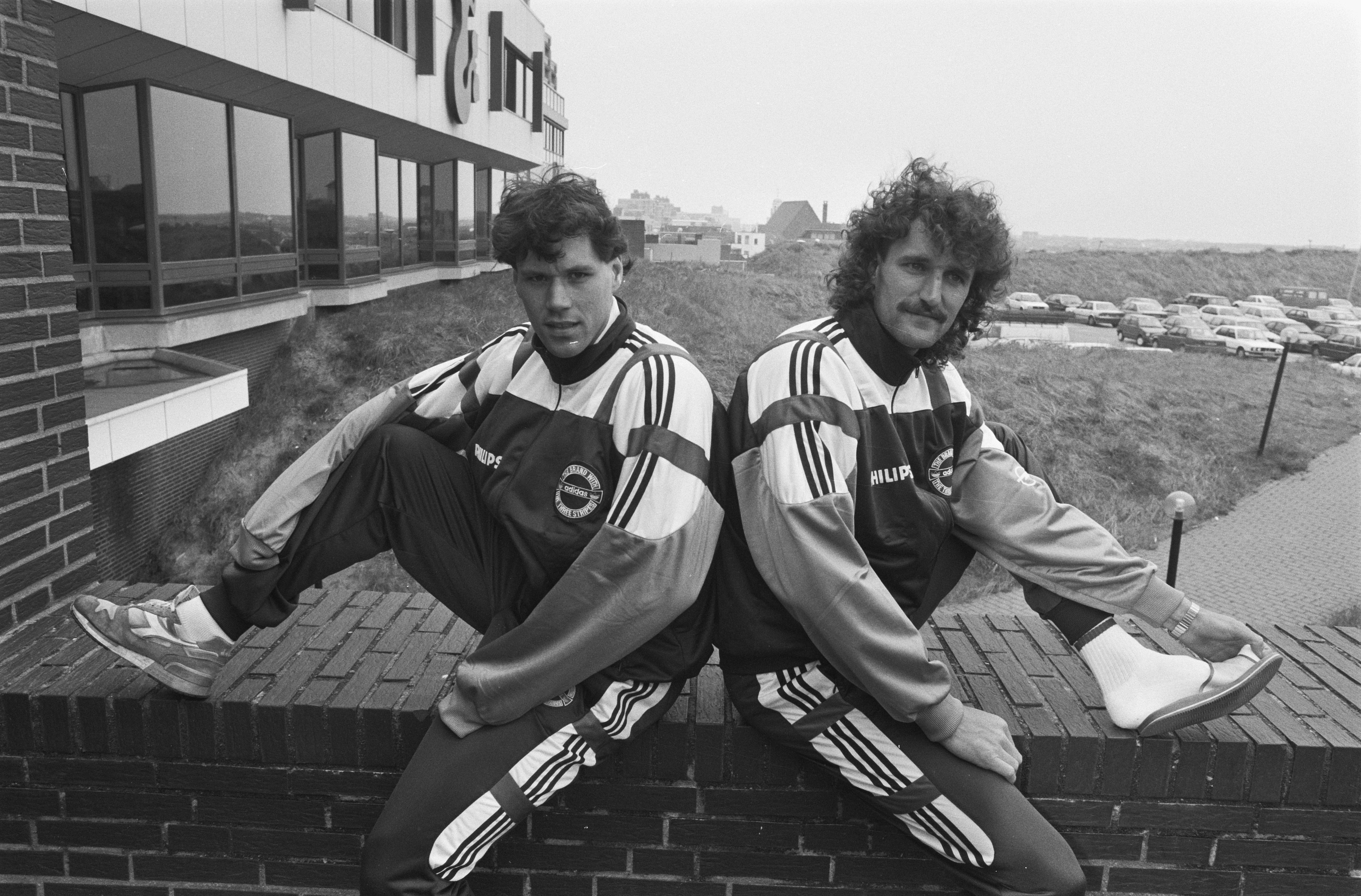
- Marco van Basten and Eijkelkamp, 1989

Personal information
- Date of birth: 6 April 1964 (age 62)
- Place of birth: Dalfsen, Netherlands
- Height: 1.95 m (6 ft 5 in)
- Position: Forward

Youth career
- SV Dalfsen

Senior career*
Years	Team	Apps	(Gls)
1981–1986	Go Ahead Eagles	116	(28)
1986–1990	Groningen	121	(47)
1990–1993	KV Mechelen	93	(28)
1993–1995	Club Brugge	53	(14)
1995–1997	PSV	44	(12)
1997–1999	Schalke 04	44	(6)
Total		469	(134)

International career
1988–1995	Netherlands	6	(0)

Managerial career
- 2002–2004: Go Ahead Eagles (assistant)
- 2004–2006: PSV (assistant)
- 2006–2007: Twente (assistant)
- 2008–2009: Schalke 04 (coach)
- 2009–2012: PSV (coach)
- 2011–2012: Netherlands (goalkeeping coach)
- 2012–2013: Vitesse (coach)
- 2020: PSV (assistant)
- * Club domestic league appearances and goals

René Antonius Maria Eijkelkamp (born 6 April 1964) is a Dutch football coach and former player who played as a Forward He has been assistant coach at PSV and the Netherlands national team.

== Club career ==
Born in Dalfsen, Eijkelkamp started his professional career in the 1981–82 season at Go Ahead Eagles in Deventer, where he stayed for five seasons.

The tall striker then moved to FC Groningen (1986–1990), KV Mechelen (1990–1993), Club Brugge (1993–1995) and PSV Eindhoven (1995–1997). His last two seasons he played in Germany, for Schalke 04.

== International career ==
Eijkelkamp made his debut for the Netherlands national team in a November 1988 friendly match against Italy and earned a total of six caps, scoring no goals. His final international was a September 1995 UEFA Euro Championship qualification match against Belarus.

== Managerial career ==
Eijkelkamp has also obtained his coaching license at CIOS Friesland College Heerenveen in 2000. He has worked as an assistant manager at Go Ahead Eagles, FC Twente, PSV and the Oranje.

== Honours ==
Club Brugge

- Belgian Cup: 1994–95

PSV

- Eredivisie: 1996–97
- KNVB Cup: 1995–96
- Johan Cruyff Shield: 1996
