= Koparit =

Finnish football club

- Full name: Koparit Kuopion Pallotoverit
- Founded: 1931
- Dissolved: 1990; 35 years ago
- Ground: Väinölänniemi
- Capacity: 12,000
Home colours

Koparit (originally Kuopion Pallotoverit, or KPT for short) was a football club from Kuopio, Finland. It was founded in 1931 and disbanded in 1990. The club played a total of 21 seasons in the Finnish premier division Mestaruussarja between 1938 and 1987, reaching the runners-up position twice, in the 1978 and 1981 seasons. It participated in the UEFA Cup in the 1979–80 and 1982–83 seasons but were knocked out in the first round on both attempts.

== History ==
KPT was formed 1931 after internal disputes in KuPS. They grew rapidly and was one of countries leading youth clubs during its early years. Their strong work with youngsters led club to be promoted to premier league as a first inland club in 1937. In 1980s club was driven in to financial difficulties which eventually led to disbanding of the club in early 1990s.

== Season to season ==
Season to Season

Season	Level	Division	Section	Administration	Position	Movements
1932	Tier 3	Piirinsarja (District League)		Savo District (SPL Savo)	5th	
1933	Tier 3	Piirinsarja (District League)		Savo District (SPL Savo)	6th	
1934	Tier 2	B-sarja (First Division)	East Group	Finnish FA (Suomen Palloliitto)	4th	
1935	Tier 2	B-sarja (First Division)	East Group	Finnish FA (Suomen Palloliitto)	3rd	
1936	Tier 2	Itä-Länsi-sarja (First Division)	East Group	Finnish FA (Suomen Palloliitto)	1st	Promotion Group 3rd
1937	Tier 2	Itä-Länsi-sarja (First Division)	East Group	Finnish FA (Suomen Palloliitto)	1st	Promotion Playoff - Promoted
1938	Tier 1	Mestaruussarja (Premier League)		Finnish FA (Suomen Palloliitto)	7th	Relegation Playoff
1939	Tier 1	Mestaruussarja (Premier League)		Finnish FA (Suomen Palloliitto)	7th	Relegated
1940–41	Tier 2	B-sarja (First Division)		Finnish FA (Suomen Palloliitto)	2nd	Promoted
1943-44	Tier 1	Mestaruussarja (Premier League)		Finnish FA (Suomen Palloliitto)	8th	
1945	Tier 1	Mestaruussarja (Premier League)	Group B	Finnish FA (Suomen Palloliitto)	2nd	
1945-46	Tier 1	Mestaruussarja (Premier League)		Finnish FA (Suomen Palloliitto)	7th	Relegated
1946-47	Tier 2	Suomensarja (First Division)	North Group	Finnish FA (Suomen Palloliitto)	3rd	
1947-48	Tier 2	Suomensarja (First Division)	North Group	Finnish FA (Suomen Palloliitto)	6th	
1948	Tier 2	Suomensarja (First Division)	North Group	Finnish FA (Suomen Palloliitto)	5th	
1949	Tier 2	Suomensarja (First Division)	East Group	Finnish FA (Suomen Palloliitto)	6th	
1950	Tier 2	Suomensarja (First Division)	East Group	Finnish FA (Suomen Palloliitto)	4th	
1951	Tier 2	Suomensarja (First Division)	East Group	Finnish FA (Suomen Palloliitto)	6th	
1952	Tier 2	Suomensarja (First Division)	East Group	Finnish FA (Suomen Palloliitto)	3rd	
1953	Tier 2	Suomensarja (First Division)	East Group	Finnish FA (Suomen Palloliitto)	1st	Promoted
1954	Tier 1	Mestaruussarja (Premier League)		Finnish FA (Suomen Palloliitto)	10th	Relegated
1955	Tier 2	Suomensarja (First Division)	East Group	Finnish FA (Suomen Palloliitto)	3rd	
1956	Tier 2	Suomensarja (First Division)	East Group	Finnish FA (Suomen Palloliitto)	5th	
1957	Tier 2	Suomensarja (First Division)	East Group	Finnish FA (Suomen Palloliitto)	3rd	
1958	Tier 2	Suomensarja (First Division)	North Group	Finnish FA (Suomen Palloliitto)	2nd	
1959	Tier 2	Suomensarja (First Division)	North Group	Finnish FA (Suomen Palloliitto)	2nd	
1960	Tier 2	Suomensarja (First Division)	East Group	Finnish FA (Suomen Palloliitto)	5th	
1961	Tier 2	Suomensarja (First Division)	North Group	Finnish FA (Suomen Palloliitto)	2nd	Promotion Playoff
1962	Tier 2	Suomensarja (First Division)	North Group	Finnish FA (Suomen Palloliitto)	5th	
1963	Tier 2	Suomensarja (First Division)	North Group	Finnish FA (Suomen Palloliitto)	12th	Relegated
1964	Tier 3	Maakuntasarja (Second Division)	Group 7	Finnish FA (Suomen Palloliitto)	4th	
1965	Tier 3	Maakuntasarja (Second Division)	Group 7	Finnish FA (Suomen Palloliitto)	7th	Relegated
1966	Tier 4	Aluesarja (Third Division)	Group 13	Savo (SPL Savo)	1st	Promoted
1967	Tier 3	Maakuntasarja (Second Division)	Group 8	Finnish FA (Suomen Palloliitto)	5th	
1968	Tier 3	Maakuntasarja (Second Division)	Group 6	Finnish FA (Suomen Palloliitto)	1st	Promoted
1969	Tier 2	Suomensarja (First Division)	North Group	Finnish FA (Suomen Palloliitto)	8th	
1970	Tier 2	II Divisioona (First Division)	North Group	Finnish FA (Suomen Palloliitto)	9th	
1971	Tier 2	II Divisioona (First Division)	North Group	Finnish FA (Suomen Palloliitto)	1st	Promotion Group 1st - Promoted
1972	Tier 1	Mestaruussarja (Premier League)		Finnish FA (Suomen Palloliitto)	7th	
1973	Tier 1	Mestaruussarja (Premier League)		Finnish FA (Suomen Palloliitto)	6th	
1974	Tier 1	Mestaruussarja (Premier League)		Finnish FA (Suomen Palloliitto)	5th	
1975	Tier 1	Mestaruussarja (Premier League)		Finnish FA (Suomen Palloliitto)	5th	
1976	Tier 1	Mestaruussarja (Premier League)		Finnish FA (Suomen Palloliitto)	12th	Relegated
1977	Tier 2	I Divisioona (First Division)		Finnish FA (Suomen Palloliitto)	1st	Promoted
1978	Tier 1	Mestaruussarja (Premier League)		Finnish FA (Suomen Palloliitto)	2nd	
1979	Tier 1	Mestaruussarja (Premier League)		Finnish FA (Suomen Palloliitto)	5th	
1980	Tier 1	SM-Sarja (Premier League)		Finnish FA (Suomen Palloliitto)	11th	Relegation Group 1st
1981	Tier 1	SM-Sarja (Premier League)		Finnish FA (Suomen Palloliitto)	1st	Championship Group 2nd
1982	Tier 1	SM-Sarja (Premier League)		Finnish FA (Suomen Palloliitto)	2nd	Championship Group 5th
1983	Tier 1	SM-Sarja (Premier League)		Finnish FA (Suomen Palloliitto)	8th	Championship Group 7th
1984	Tier 1	SM-Sarja (Premier League)		Finnish FA (Suomen Palloliitto)	10th	
1985	Tier 1	SM-Sarja (Premier League)		Finnish FA (Suomen Palloliitto)	11th	Relegation Playoff
1986	Tier 1	SM-Sarja (Premier League)		Finnish FA (Suomen Palloliitto)	9th	
1987	Tier 1	SM-Sarja (Premier League)		Finnish FA (Suomen Palloliitto)	12th	Relegated
1988	Tier 2	I Divisioona (First Division)		Finnish FA (Suomen Palloliitto)	6th	
1989	Tier 2	I Divisioona (First Division)		Finnish FA (Suomen Palloliitto)	3rd	
1990	Tier 2	I Divisioona (First Division)		Finnish FA (Suomen Palloliitto)	11th'	Relegated
1991	Tier 3	II Divisioona (Second Division)	North Group	Finnish FA (Suomen Palloliitto)	12th	Relegated - merged with Elo to form FC Kuopio

- 21 seasons in Mestaruussarja
- 29 seasons in I Divisioona
- 7 season in II Divisioona
- 1 season in Aluesarja

== Honours ==
- Finnish Championship:
  - Runners-up (2): 1978, 1981
- Finnish Cup:
  - Runners-up (2): 1957, 1978
