= Alexandre Czerniatynski =

Belgian footballer

Personal information
- Date of birth: 28 July 1960 (age 66)
- Place of birth: Charleroi, Belgium
- Height: 1.86 m (6 ft 1 in)
- Position: Striker

Senior career*
Years	Team	Apps	(Gls)
1977–1981	Sporting Charleroi	55	(17)
1981–1982	Royal Antwerp	34	(15)
1982–1985	Anderlecht	87	(43)
1985–1989	Standard Liège	116	(46)
1989–1993	Royal Antwerp	109	(45)
1993–1996	Mechelen	86	(20)
1996–1997	Germinal Ekeren	36	(11)
1997–1999	Royal Tilleur FC	37	(15)
Total		560	(212)

International career
1981–1994	Belgium	31	(6)

Managerial career
- 1999–2001: Standard Liège (youth)
- 2001–2002: KV Mechelen (youth)
- 2002–2003: KV Mechelen
- 2004–2006: Kampenhout
- 2006–2007: Union SG
- 2007–2009: Beveren
- 2010: Tournai
- 2010–2011: Olympic Charleroi
- 2012: Sportkring Sint-Niklaas
- 2013–2015: Waasland-Beveren (assistant)
- 2015: Seraing United
- 2016: RFC Liège
- 2018: KFC Duffel
- 2018–2019: Châtelet
- 2019: Olympic Charleroi
- * Club domestic league appearances and goals

Alexandre "Alex" Czerniatynski (born 28 July 1960) is a Belgian former footballer who played as a striker.

== Club career ==
Czerniatynski played for Charleroi, Antwerp, Anderlecht, Standard, Antwerp again, KV Mechelen, Germinal Ekeren and Tilleur-Liège. He was part of the team when Antwerp played its last European final against Parma in the 1992–93 UEFA Cup Winners' Cup, as well as in that of Anderlecht for its two European finals in the 1982–83 UEFA Cup and the 1983–84 UEFA Cup (scoring in the latter). Anderlecht played its last European final in the 1989–90 UEFA Cup Winners' Cup.

== International career ==
Czerniatynski played 31 games, scoring six goals, for Belgium. He was also in the Belgian team for the 1982, scoring one goal, and 1994 World Cups as well as for the Euro 1984 but he did not play a game in that tournament.

== Coaching career ==
On 27 April 2009, K.S.K. Beveren officials sacked Czerniatynski as coach. On 6 June 2010, it was announced that Czerniatynski would become the new head coach of Olympic Charleroi.

== Honours ==
=== Player ===
Anderlecht

- Belgian First Division: 1984–85
- UEFA Cup: 1982–83; runner-up 1983–84
- Jules Pappaert Cup: 1983, 1985

Standard Liège

- Belgian Cup: runner-up 1987–88, 1988–89

Royal Antwerp

- Belgian Cup: 1991–92
- UEFA Cup Winners' Cup: runner-up 1992–93

Germinal Ekeren

- Belgian Cup: 1996–97

=== Individual ===
- European Cup Winners Cup top scorer: 1992–93 (seven goals)
