= Oulun Palloseura =

Finnish sports club

Oulun Palloseura or OPS is a Finnish multi-sports club based in Oulu. The club has sections in football, bandy and bowling. The club was founded in 1927.

== Football ==
Oulun Palloseura
| Home colours | Away colours |

The football team has won the Finnish championship twice (1979, 1980) and as a consequence played in the European Cup twice. On both occasions they met the English champions Liverpool. In the 1980–81 season they drew 1–1 in Finland, and lost 1–10 at Anfield. In the 1981–82 season they lost 0–1 in Finland, and 0–7 at Anfield.

Now their senior football team is playing in Ykkönen.

== Bandy ==
OPS bandy club is playing in the top tier of Finnish bandy, the Bandyliiga.

=== Achievements ===
- Finnish Championship

- Winners 1953, 1956, 1960, 1961, 1962, 1963, 1964
- Silver 1945, 1946, 1947, 1948, 1951, 1952, 1955, 1957, 1958, 1959
- Bronze 1954, 1965, 1967
