= 2002 UEFA Women's Under-19 Championship squads =

European women's football competition squads

Players born on or after 1 January 1983 were eligible to participate in the tournament. Players' ages as of 2 May 2002 – the tournament's opening day. Players in bold have also been capped at full international level. Thirty-player squads are as per the UEFA tournament programme.

== Group A ==
=== Sweden ===
Head coach : (Sweden) Anna Signeul

No.	Pos.	Player	Date of birth (age)	Caps	Goals	Club
1	GK	**Hedvig Lindahl**	29 April 1983 (aged 19)			(Swedish Football Association) Malmö FF
2	DF	**Anna Paulson**	29 February 1984 (aged 18)			(Swedish Football Association) Umeå IK
3	DF	Maria Nilsson	5 February 1984 (aged 18)			(Swedish Football Association) Holmalunds IF
4	DF	Yolanda Odenyo	19 March 1984 (aged 18)			(Swedish Football Association) Bälinge IF
5	DF	Nera Smajić	15 March 1984 (aged 18)			(Swedish Football Association) Bälinge IF
6	FW	**Lotta Schelin**	27 February 1984 (aged 18)			(Swedish Football Association) Landvetters IF
7	MF	Madelene Göras	20 January 1983 (aged 19)			(Swedish Football Association) Umeå IK
8	MF	**Nilla Fischer**	2 August 1984 (aged 17)			(Swedish Football Association) Kristianstad/Wä DFF
9	FW	Anna Hedström	9 December 1983 (aged 18)			(Swedish Football Association) QBIK
10	FW	Emma Lindqvist	5 April 1983 (aged 19)			(Swedish Football Association) Umeå IK
11	FW	**Josefine Öqvist**	23 July 1983 (aged 18)			(Swedish Football Association) Bälinge IF
12	GK	Maria Edman	18 April 1984 (aged 18)			(Swedish Football Association) Stattena IF
13	FW	**Sara Lindén**	1 September 1983 (aged 18)			(Swedish Football Association) Dalsjöfors GoIF
14	MF	Maria Westerblad	15 May 1983 (aged 18)			(Swedish Football Association) Malmö FF
15	FW	Anna Mörstam	2 June 1983 (aged 18)			(Swedish Football Association) Östers IF
16	FW	Lina Karlsson	8 June 1984 (aged 17)			(Swedish Football Association) QBIK
17	MF	Jennie Andréason	25 February 1984 (aged 18)			(Swedish Football Association) Malmö FF
18	MF	Hodan Siid-Ahmed	4 April 1984 (aged 18)			(Swedish Football Association) AIK
19	MF	Therese Persson	18 February 1983 (aged 19)			(Swedish Football Association) Mallbackens IF
20	MF	Madeleine Tegström	12 April 1983 (aged 19)			(Swedish Football Association) Falköpings KIK
21	GK	Sandra Wahldén	23 June 1983 (aged 18)			(Swedish Football Association) Staffanstorps GIF
22	DF	**Annica Svensson**	3 March 1983 (aged 19)			(Swedish Football Association) Rävåsens IK
23	MF	Linda Nöjd	29 January 1983 (aged 19)			(Swedish Football Association) Dalsjöfors GoIF
24	DF	Alexandra Udin	15 March 1984 (aged 18)			(Swedish Football Association) Gideonsbergs IF
25	DF	Victoria Stridh	21 July 1983 (aged 18)			(Swedish Football Association) Tunafors SK
26	DF	Sofia Jonsson	27 October 1984 (aged 17)			(Swedish Football Association) Umeå Södra FF
27	DF	Sandra Berggren	7 January 1983 (aged 19)			(Swedish Football Association) Sunnanå SK
28	MF	Anna Berglund	18 October 1984 (aged 17)			(Swedish Football Association) Nittorps IK
29	DF	Magdalena Esseryd	28 May 1984 (aged 17)			(Swedish Football Association) Holmalunds IF
30	DF	Lina Andersson	3 May 1984 (aged 17)			(Swedish Football Association) Bälinge IF

=== Spain ===
Head coach: (Spain) Ignacio Quereda

No.	Pos.	Player	Date of birth (age)	Caps	Goals	Club
1	GK	**María José Pons**	8 August 1984 (aged 17)			(Royal Spanish Football Federation) CE Sabadell
2	DF	**Iraia Iturregi**	24 April 1985 (aged 17)			(Royal Spanish Football Federation) Leioa EFT
3	DF	Julia Olmos	12 September 1983 (aged 18)			(Royal Spanish Football Federation) Levante UD
4	DF	Rosa Munar	10 August 1984 (aged 17)			(Royal Spanish Football Federation) CD Playas de Calvià
5	DF	Saioa González	3 April 1984 (aged 18)			(Royal Spanish Football Federation) Leioa EFT
6	DF	Noemí Rubio	7 December 1983 (aged 18)			(Royal Spanish Football Federation) CE Sabadell
7	DF	Elena Sanz	13 May 1984 (aged 17)			(Royal Spanish Football Federation) CD Castejón
8	DF	Noelia Carrillo	21 June 1983 (aged 18)			(Royal Spanish Football Federation) CE Sabadell
9	DF	Evelyn Santos	21 October 1983 (aged 18)			(Royal Spanish Football Federation) Eibartarrak FT
10	DF	Ana Belén Fuertes	22 May 1984 (aged 17)			(Royal Spanish Football Federation) Peña Madridista NS La Antigua
11	DF	Tamara García	9 December 1985 (aged 16)			(Royal Spanish Football Federation) UD Perú
12	MF	Margalida Más	14 February 1983 (aged 19)			(Royal Spanish Football Federation) CD Playas de Calvià
13	GK	**Ainhoa Tirapu**	4 September 1984 (aged 17)			(Royal Spanish Football Federation) SD Lagunak
14	MF	Maite Lizaso	25 October 1983 (aged 18)			(Royal Spanish Football Federation) Zarautz KE
15	MF	Uxue Astiz	31 August 1983 (aged 18)			(Royal Spanish Football Federation) CD Amaya
16	MF	María del Rocío Santana	14 March 1983 (aged 19)			(Royal Spanish Football Federation) CD Rayco
17	MF	**Saray García**	5 September 1984 (aged 17)			(Royal Spanish Football Federation) AD Torrejón CF
18	MF	Oihana Galdona	1 March 1985 (aged 17)			(Royal Spanish Football Federation) Zarautz KE
19	MF	**Melisa Nicolau**	20 June 1984 (aged 17)			(Royal Spanish Football Federation) CD Playas de Calvià
20	FW	**Priscila Borja**	28 April 1985 (aged 17)			(Royal Spanish Football Federation) CD Híspalis
21	GK	Cristina Cruz	23 September 1983 (aged 18)			(Royal Spanish Football Federation) CF Pozuelo de Alarcón
22	FW	María Ruiz	13 June 1983 (aged 18)			(Royal Spanish Football Federation) CD Lourdes
23	FW	**Erika Vázquez**	16 February 1983 (aged 19)			(Royal Spanish Football Federation) SD Lagunak
24	FW	**María José Pérez**	19 March 1984 (aged 18)			(Royal Spanish Football Federation) EMF Candelaria
25	FW	Sara Nayra Fernández	24 September 1984 (aged 17)			(Royal Spanish Football Federation) EMF Candelaria
26	DF	Sonia Prim	5 January 1984 (aged 18)			(Royal Spanish Football Federation) CF Pozuelo de Alarcón
27	MF	Gurutze del Ama	18 September 1984 (aged 17)			(Royal Spanish Football Federation) Añorga KKE
28	MF	**Sonia Bermúdez**	15 November 1984 (aged 17)			(Royal Spanish Football Federation) CF Pozuelo de Alarcón
29	FW	Marta Santamaria	18 September 1984 (aged 17)			(Royal Spanish Football Federation) Villarreal CF
30	MF	**Adriana Martín**	7 November 1986 (aged 15)			(Royal Spanish Football Federation) FC Barcelona

=== France ===
Head coach : (France) Bruno Bini

No.	Pos.	Player	Date of birth (age)	Caps	Goals	Club
1	GK	Géraldine Marty	3 May 1983 (aged 18)			(French Football Federation) Toulouse
2	GK	**Bérangère Sapowicz**	6 February 1983 (aged 19)			(French Football Federation) Évreux AC
3	GK	**Laëtitia Stribick**	22 January 1984 (aged 18)			(French Football Federation) ES La Rochelle
4	GK	**Sarah Bouhaddi**	17 October 1986 (aged 15)			(French Football Federation) OS Monaco
5	GK	Adeline Boyer	1 April 1984 (aged 18)			(French Football Federation) Toulouse
6	DF	**Sandrine Dusang**	23 March 1984 (aged 18)			(French Football Federation) FCF Nord Allier
7	DF	**Laura Georges**	20 August 1984 (aged 17)			(French Football Federation) Paris Saint-Germain
8	DF	Marie-Claude Herlem	12 March 1984 (aged 18)			(French Football Federation) USO Bruay
9	DF	**Ophélie Meilleroux**	18 January 1984 (aged 18)			(French Football Federation) FCF Nord Allier
10	DF	**Corine Petit**	5 October 1983 (aged 18)			(French Football Federation) ASJ Soyaux
11	DF	Faustine Roux	24 March 1984 (aged 18)			(French Football Federation) FCF Nord Allier
12	DF	Julie Soulet	7 February 1983 (aged 19)			(French Football Federation) FCF Juvisy
13	DF	Nathalie Jarosz	25 December 1985 (aged 16)			(French Football Federation) USO Bruay
14	MF	**Camille Abily**	5 December 1984 (aged 17)			(French Football Federation) ESOF La Roche-sur-Yon
15	MF	Zoé Avner	18 July 1983 (aged 18)			(French Football Federation) FCF Juvisy
16	MF	**Anne-Laure Casseleux**	13 April 1984 (aged 18)			(French Football Federation) Lyon
17	MF	**Amélie Coquet**	31 December 1984 (aged 17)			(French Football Federation) FCF Hénin-Beaumont
18	DF	**Ludivine Diguelman**	15 April 1984 (aged 18)			(French Football Federation) Montpellier HSC
19	MF	Aurélie Meynard	25 June 1983 (aged 18)			(French Football Federation) ASJ Soyaux
20	MF	Audrey Monicolle	12 May 1983 (aged 18)			(French Football Federation) Toulouse
21	MF	**Élise Bussaglia**	24 September 1985 (aged 16)			(French Football Federation) Saint-Memmie O
22	MF	Anaëlle Marme	19 March 1983 (aged 19)			(French Football Federation) USCCO Compiègne
23	MF	**Anne-Laure Perrot**	7 July 1985 (aged 16)			(French Football Federation) Lyon
24	MF	Mélanie Besnard	15 March 1985 (aged 17)			(French Football Federation) Évreux AC
25	FW	**Sandrine Rouquet**	16 May 1983 (aged 18)			(French Football Federation) Toulouse
26	FW	Jeanne Haag	26 October 1983 (aged 18)			(French Football Federation) SC Schiltigheim
27	FW	**Claire Morel**	14 February 1984 (aged 18)			(French Football Federation) USCCO Compiègne
28	FW	**Élodie Ramos**	13 March 1983 (aged 19)			(French Football Federation) SC Schiltigheim
29	FW	**Lilas Traïkia**	6 August 1985 (aged 16)			(French Football Federation) Toulouse
30	MF	**Sandrine Brétigny**	7 February 1984 (aged 18)			(French Football Federation) Lyon

=== Germany ===
Head coach : (Germany) Silvia Neid

No.	Pos.	Player	Date of birth (age)	Caps	Goals	Club
1	GK	Miriam Elling	14 April 1984 (aged 18)			(German Football Association) FFC Heike Rheine
2	DF	Alexandra Stegmann	17 October 1983 (aged 18)			(German Football Association) SC Freiburg
3	DF	Christel Behr	11 July 1984 (aged 17)			(German Football Association) FSC Mönchengladbach
4	DF	Johanna Loistl	14 July 1984 (aged 17)			(German Football Association) FFC Wacker München
5	DF	**Sarah Günther**	25 January 1983 (aged 19)			(German Football Association) ATS Buntentor
6	MF	**Viola Odebrecht**	11 February 1983 (aged 19)			(German Football Association) 1. FFC Turbine Potsdam
7	MF	Andrea Richter	8 May 1984 (aged 17)			(German Football Association) SV Hastenbeck
8	MF	Anne-Kathrin Sabel	30 June 1983 (aged 18)			(German Football Association) FSV Frankfurt
9	FW	Patrizia Barucha	7 April 1983 (aged 19)			(German Football Association) FSV Frankfurt
10	MF	Barbara Müller	3 March 1983 (aged 19)			(German Football Association) FSC Mönchengladbach
11	MF	**Isabell Bachor**	10 July 1983 (aged 18)			(German Football Association) FSV Frankfurt
12	GK	Nadine Richter	24 July 1984 (aged 17)			(German Football Association) FFC Heike Rheine
13	DF	Claudia Kierner	5 September 1983 (aged 18)			(German Football Association) FC Bayern Munich
14	DF	Susanne Kasperczyk	1 August 1985 (aged 16)			(German Football Association) FC Teutonia Weiden
15	DF	Christina Krüger	29 November 1984 (aged 17)			(German Football Association) FC Gütersloh
16	FW	Aferdita Kameraj	5 June 1984 (aged 17)			(German Football Association) Hamburger SV
17	MF	Annelie Brendel	24 September 1983 (aged 18)			(German Football Association) 1. FFC Turbine Potsdam
18	FW	**Anja Mittag**	16 May 1985 (aged 16)			(German Football Association) FC Erzgebirge Aue
19	DF	Melanie Scholz	14 March 1984 (aged 18)			(German Football Association) FC Gütersloh
20	DF	Finni Derda	30 July 1983 (aged 18)			(German Football Association) WSV Wolfsburg-Wendschott
21	DF	Kerstin Schmitt	1 October 1985 (aged 16)			(German Football Association) 1. FC Schweinfurt 05
22	GK	Nadine Nünnke	5 April 1984 (aged 18)			(German Football Association) TSV Pfersee Augsburg
23	DF	Anna Marciak	27 October 1983 (aged 18)			(German Football Association) FSV Frankfurt
24	DF	Theresa Hunecke	27 November 1984 (aged 17)			(German Football Association) FFC Heike Rheine
25	FW	Stefanie Weichelt	23 August 1983 (aged 18)			(German Football Association) 1. FFC Turbine Potsdam
26	MF	**Nadja Inan**	10 September 1984 (aged 17)			(German Football Association) FSC Mönchengladbach
27	DF	Christine Schoknecht	29 October 1984 (aged 17)			(German Football Association) Tennis Borussia Berlin
28	FW	**Jennifer Zietz**	14 September 1983 (aged 18)			(German Football Association) 1. FFC Turbine Potsdam
29	FW	**Shelley Thompson**	8 February 1984 (aged 18)			(German Football Association) FCR 2001 Duisburg
30	GK	Melanie Winterhalder	16 January 1984 (aged 18)			(German Football Association) SC Freiburg

== Group B ==
=== Norway ===
Head coach : (Norway) Jarl Torske

No.	Pos.	Player	Date of birth (age)	Caps	Goals	Club
1	GK	**Silje Vesterbekkmo**	22 June 1983 (aged 18)			(Norwegian Football Federation) Røa IL
2	DF	**Siri Nordeide Grønli**	17 April 1984 (aged 18)			(Norwegian Football Federation) Asker
3	DF	Stine Marie Sørlie	9 April 1983 (aged 19)			(Norwegian Football Federation) Vålerenga
4	DF	Elin Sola	21 May 1983 (aged 18)			(Norwegian Football Federation) Klepp IL
5	DF	**Runa Vikestad**	13 August 1984 (aged 17)			(Norwegian Football Federation) IF Fløya
6	FW	Marit Lyngroth	14 May 1983 (aged 18)			(Norwegian Football Federation) Kattem IL
7	MF	**Guro Knutsen**	10 January 1985 (aged 17)			(Norwegian Football Federation) Kattem IL
8	MF	Kaia Ruud Solem	22 December 1983 (aged 18)			(Norwegian Football Federation) Vålerenga
9	MF	**Lene Espedal**	11 January 1983 (aged 19)			(Norwegian Football Federation) Klepp IL
10	FW	**Lisa-Marie Woods**	23 May 1984 (aged 17)			(Norwegian Football Federation) Asker
11	FW	Reidun Nilsen	10 May 1984 (aged 17)			(Norwegian Football Federation) Asker
12	GK	**Caroline Knutsen**	21 November 1983 (aged 18)			(Norwegian Football Federation) Asker
13	DF	Silje Kopka da Fonseca	6 March 1984 (aged 18)			(Norwegian Football Federation) Kolbotn
14	FW	**Anneli Giske**	25 July 1985 (aged 16)			(Norwegian Football Federation) Medkila IL
15	MF	**Marthe Braavold Johansen**	16 September 1983 (aged 18)			(Norwegian Football Federation) FK Larvik
16	MF	Ann Mariell Storvold	13 February 1983 (aged 19)			(Norwegian Football Federation) SK Trondheims-Ørn
17	MF	Lise-Marie Bergvoll	13 March 1984 (aged 18)			(Norwegian Football Federation) Medkila IL
18	MF	**Stine Frantzen**	29 January 1984 (aged 18)			(Norwegian Football Federation) Medkila IL
19	DF	Ellen Wiersholm	18 November 1984 (aged 17)			(Norwegian Football Federation) Athene Moss
20	FW	Sissel Strand	31 July 1984 (aged 17)			(Norwegian Football Federation) Team Strømmen
21	FW	Siv Anita Løkken	29 June 1983 (aged 18)			(Norwegian Football Federation) Skeid
22	DF	Solveig Midttun	11 January 1983 (aged 19)			(Norwegian Football Federation) IL Sandviken
23	FW	Christina Normann	28 July 1983 (aged 18)			(Norwegian Football Federation) Medkila IL
24	DF	Cathrine Hoff	24 July 1985 (aged 16)			(Norwegian Football Federation) IL Sandviken
25	FW	Irene Henriksen	28 February 1984 (aged 18)			(Norwegian Football Federation) Vålerenga
26	MF	**Mari Knudsen**	17 February 1984 (aged 18)			(Norwegian Football Federation) Skjetten SK
27	FW	Natalia Galvez	12 March 1984 (aged 18)			(Norwegian Football Federation) Kolbotn
28	MF	Ranveig Aas-Hansen	6 February 1983 (aged 19)			(Norwegian Football Federation) FK Larvik
29	GK	Synnøve Svarstad	15 April 1984 (aged 18)			(Norwegian Football Federation) Fortuna Ålesund
30	MF	Tove Beate Liland	17 May 1983 (aged 18)			(Norwegian Football Federation) Klepp IL

=== England ===
Head coach : (England) Mo Marley

No.	Pos.	Player	Date of birth (age)	Caps	Goals	Club
1	GK	Toni-Anne Wayne	8 May 1983 (aged 18)			(The Football Association) Arsenal
2	DF	**Leanne Champ**	10 August 1983 (aged 18)			(The Football Association) Arsenal
3	DF	**Corinne Yorston**	15 June 1983 (aged 18)			(The Football Association) Southampton Saints
4	MF	**Fara Williams**	25 January 1984 (aged 18)			(The Football Association) Charlton Athletic
5	DF	Jessica Wright	11 September 1983 (aged 18)			(The Football Association) Barnet
6	DF	**Laura Bassett**	2 August 1983 (aged 18)			(The Football Association) Birmingham City
7	FW	**Alex Scott**	14 October 1984 (aged 17)			(The Football Association) Arsenal
8	MF	**Kelly McDougall**	22 January 1984 (aged 18)			(The Football Association) Everton
9	FW	Katy Ward	5 January 1984 (aged 18)			(The Football Association) Birmingham City
10	FW	**Ellen Maggs**	16 February 1983 (aged 19)			(The Football Association) Arsenal
11	MF	**Michelle Hickmott**	20 February 1985 (aged 17)			(The Football Association) Birmingham City
12	MF	**Emily Westwood**	5 April 1984 (aged 18)			(The Football Association) Wolverhampton Wanderers
13	GK	Rachelle Houldsworth	18 June 1984 (aged 17)			(The Football Association) Sheffield Wednesday
14	DF	Shelly Cox	16 May 1984 (aged 17)			(The Football Association) Southampton Saints
15	DF	Sophie Krivinskas	17 January 1984 (aged 18)			(The Football Association) Everton
16	MF	Sheuneen Ta	21 July 1985 (aged 16)			(The Football Association) Arsenal
17	FW	Faye Dunn	8 October 1983 (aged 18)			(The Football Association) Tranmere Rovers
18	MF	Laura Humphries	12 February 1983 (aged 19)			(The Football Association) Sunderland
19	DF	Faye Cardin	25 September 1984 (aged 17)			(The Football Association) Birmingham City
20	DF	Joanne Traynor	25 November 1984 (aged 17)			(The Football Association) Everton
21	GK	Julie Spearink	24 December 1984 (aged 17)			(The Football Association) Southampton Saints
22	FW	Jodie McGuckin	29 July 1984 (aged 17)			(The Football Association) Birmingham City
23	FW	Georgie Adams	7 November 1984 (aged 17)			(The Football Association) Arsenal
24	MF	**Josanne Potter**	13 November 1984 (aged 17)			(The Football Association) Birmingham City
25	MF	**Anita Asante**	27 April 1985 (aged 17)			(The Football Association) Arsenal
26	MF	Sara Bayman	23 December 1984 (aged 17)			(The Football Association) Everton
27	MF	Claire Bridgett	25 September 1985 (aged 16)			(The Football Association) Sunderland
28	FW	Kim Holden	27 September 1985 (aged 16)			(The Football Association) Tranmere Rovers
29	MF	Natasha Caswell	20 January 1985 (aged 17)			(The Football Association) Reading Royals
30	MF	**Deena Rahman**	23 February 1983 (aged 19)			(The Football Association) Fulham

=== Switzerland ===
Head coach : (Switzerland) Béatrice von Siebenthal

No.	Pos.	Player	Date of birth (age)	Caps	Goals	Club
1	DF	**Noémie Beney**	26 April 1985 (aged 17)			(Swiss Football Association) FC Yverdon-Sports
2	MF	Vivienne Blunschi	16 January 1985 (aged 17)			(Swiss Football Association) FC Baden
3	GK	**Janine Chamot**	4 February 1983 (aged 19)			(Swiss Football Association) FC Bern
4	MF	**Lara Dickenmann**	27 November 1985 (aged 16)			(Swiss Football Association) FC Sursee
5	MF	Katrin Eggenberger	15 October 1986 (aged 15)			(Swiss Football Association) FC Bad Ragaz
6	MF	Nicole Gassmann	2 June 1985 (aged 16)			(Swiss Football Association) FC Sursee
7	FW	**Rahel Grand**	22 May 1984 (aged 17)			(Swiss Football Association) FC Vétroz
8	FW	Martina Grob	19 May 1985 (aged 16)			(Swiss Football Association) FC Zuchwil
9	MF	Simone Hofer	4 April 1986 (aged 16)			(Swiss Football Association) FC Bern
10	MF	Mara Hofer	26 September 1986 (aged 15)			(Swiss Football Association) FC Schwerzenbach
11	FW	**Sylvia Hügli**	29 May 1984 (aged 17)			(Swiss Football Association) FC Schwerzenbach
12	DF	**Daniela Künzler**	30 July 1985 (aged 16)			(Swiss Football Association) FC Bad Ragaz
13	MF	Melanie Künzler	30 July 1985 (aged 16)			(Swiss Football Association) FC Bad Ragaz
14	DF	**Valentina Matasci**	27 December 1984 (aged 17)			(Swiss Football Association) FC Rapid Lugano
15	MF	**Martina Moser**	9 April 1986 (aged 16)			(Swiss Football Association) FC Rot-Schwarz Thun
16	GK	**Marina Mosimann**	20 December 1985 (aged 16)			(Swiss Football Association) FC Rot-Schwarz Thun
17	FW	Sybille Oesch	8 December 1984 (aged 17)			(Swiss Football Association) FC Staad
18	MF	**Isabella Osterwalder**	25 May 1984 (aged 17)			(Swiss Football Association) FC Rapid Lugano
19	DF	Petra Rietberger	18 April 1984 (aged 18)			(Swiss Football Association) FC Bad Ragaz
20	MF	**Franziska Rüttimann**	18 February 1984 (aged 18)			(Swiss Football Association) FC Staad
21	DF	Nadine Schär	5 August 1984 (aged 17)			(Swiss Football Association) FC Zuchwil
22	DF	**Franziska Schärer**	10 September 1983 (aged 18)			(Swiss Football Association) FC Bern
23	FW	**Daniela Schwarz**	9 September 1985 (aged 16)			(Swiss Football Association) FC Schwerzenbach
24	DF	Franziska Seiler	10 December 1985 (aged 16)			(Swiss Football Association) FC Rot-Schwarz Thun
25	MF	**Daniela Soltermann**	30 November 1984 (aged 17)			(Swiss Football Association) SV Seebach
26	GK	Nadja Stalder	18 August 1984 (aged 17)			(Swiss Football Association) FC Root
27	DF	Stephanie Stotz	27 August 1983 (aged 18)			(Swiss Football Association) FC Bern
28	FW	**Corina Theiler**	10 December 1983 (aged 18)			(Swiss Football Association) FC Bern
29	FW	Gisèle Zufferey	14 January 1985 (aged 17)			(Swiss Football Association) FC Vétroz
30	MF	**Selina Zumbühl**	13 October 1983 (aged 18)			(Swiss Football Association) FC Schwerzenbach

=== Denmark ===
Head coach : (Denmark) Per Rud

No.	Pos.	Player	Date of birth (age)	Caps	Goals	Club
1	GK	**Susanne Graversen**	8 November 1984 (aged 17)			(Danish Football Association) Fortuna Hjørring
2	GK	Sarah Andersen	5 June 1983 (aged 18)			(Danish Football Association) Kolding IF
3	GK	Patricia Domagala	15 August 1985 (aged 16)			(Danish Football Association) Brøndby IF
4	DF	Louise Pedersen	26 February 1984 (aged 18)			(Danish Football Association) Vejle BK
5	DF	**Karen Haastrup**	29 April 1984 (aged 18)			(Danish Football Association) Vanløse IF
6	DF	Ellen Larsen	23 June 1983 (aged 18)			(Danish Football Association) Team Viborg
7	DF	**Camilla Mogensen**	3 September 1983 (aged 18)			(Danish Football Association) OB
8	DF	Trine Boman Jensen	29 January 1984 (aged 18)			(Danish Football Association) B 1921
9	DF	Mia Asmussen	17 March 1983 (aged 19)			(Danish Football Association) IK Skovbakken
10	DF	Kristina Boldt	5 September 1983 (aged 18)			(Danish Football Association) Vejle BK
11	DF	Louise Hansen Sejer	30 January 1984 (aged 18)			(Danish Football Association) Brøndby IF
12	DF	Anne Sofie Olsen	16 February 1984 (aged 18)			(Danish Football Association) Vejle BK
13	MF	**Ditte Larsen**	24 April 1983 (aged 19)			(Danish Football Association) B 1921
14	MF	**Johanna Rasmussen**	2 July 1983 (aged 18)			(Danish Football Association) B 1921
15	MF	Camilla Lauridsen	8 June 1984 (aged 17)			(Danish Football Association) Varde IF
16	MF	**Cecilie Pedersen**	19 March 1983 (aged 19)			(Danish Football Association) Brøndby IF
17	MF	**Mariann Gajhede Knudsen**	16 November 1984 (aged 17)			(Danish Football Association) Fortuna Hjørring
18	MF	Cecilie Frandsen	10 November 1984 (aged 17)			(Danish Football Association) Brøndby IF
19	MF	Maria Juul Jensen	4 February 1984 (aged 18)			(Danish Football Association) OB
20	MF	Mette Bülow	6 June 1984 (aged 17)			(Danish Football Association) OB
21	MF	Ditte Heger	16 September 1984 (aged 17)			(Danish Football Association) Vanløse IF
22	MF	Marie Louise Breith	13 October 1983 (aged 18)			(Danish Football Association) OB
23	MF	Pernille Jørgensen	14 July 1984 (aged 17)			(Danish Football Association) Thisted FC
24	FW	Dorte Gauhl Petersen	22 February 1983 (aged 19)			(Danish Football Association) B 1921
25	FW	Cecilie Frandsen	10 November 1984 (aged 17)			(Danish Football Association) Vanløse IF
26	FW	Anette Sørensen	18 April 1984 (aged 18)			(Danish Football Association) Fortuna Hjørring
27	FW	**Marie Herping**	18 March 1984 (aged 18)			(Danish Football Association) OB
28	FW	Louise Svenessen	27 August 1984 (aged 17)			(Danish Football Association) Varde IF
29	FW	Tina Falk Jacobsen	14 October 1983 (aged 18)			(Danish Football Association) Horsens SIK
30	DF	**Malene Marquard**	2 February 1983 (aged 19)			(Danish Football Association) Brøndby IF
