= 2003 UEFA Women's Cup final =

2003 UEFA Women's Cup Final
- Event: 2002–03 UEFA Women's Cup
Umeå	Fortuna Hjørring
(Sweden)	(Denmark)
7	1

First leg
Umeå	Fortuna Hjørring
4	1
- Date: 9 June 2003
- Venue: Gammliavallen, Umeå
- Referee: Elke Günthner (Germany)
- Attendance: 7,648

Second leg
Fortuna Hjørring	Umeå
0	3
- Date: 21 June 2003
- Venue: Hjørring Stadium, Hjørring
- Referee: Wendy Toms (England)
- Attendance: 2,119

The 2003 UEFA Women's Cup Final was a two-legged football match that took place on 9 and 21 June 2003 at Gammliavallen and Hjørring Stadium between Umeå IK of Sweden and Fortuna Hjørring of Denmark. It was the first final not to feature German teams. Umeå won the final 7–1 on aggregate.

== Match ==
=== Details ===
==== First leg ====
9 June 2003
16:00 CEST

Umeå (Sweden)	4–1	(Denmark) Fortuna Hjørring
Ljungberg 39', 49'; Östberg 53'; Kalmari 63'	Report	Madsen 20'

Gammliavallen, Umeå
Attendance: 7,648
Referee: Elke Günthner (Germany)

Umeå	Fortuna Hjørring

GK	1	(Sweden) Sofia Lundgren
DF	2	(Sweden) Anna Paulson
DF	4	(Sweden) Hanna Marklund
DF	5	(Sweden) Maria Bergkvist
DF	15	(Finland) Sanna Valkonen
DF	18	(Sweden) Linda Dahlqvist
MF	6	(Sweden) Malin Moström (c)
MF	9	(Sweden) Anna Sjöström	(substituted off) 80'
MF	86	(Sweden) Frida Östberg
FW	10	(Sweden) Hanna Ljungberg
FW	21	(Finland) Laura Kalmari	(substituted off) 88'
Substitutes:
GK	20	(Sweden) Ulrika Karlsson
DF	13	(Sweden) Sofia Eriksson
MF	11	(Sweden) Lotta Runesson	(substituted in) 80'
MF	14	(Sweden) Madelene Göras
FW	7	(Sweden) Maria Nordbrandt	(substituted in) 88'
FW	16	(Sweden) Emma Lindqvist
Manager:
(Sweden) Richard Holmlund

GK	1	(Denmark) Dorthe Larsen
DF	2	(Denmark) Anne-Mette Christensen
DF	7	(Denmark) Birgit Christensen
DF	14	(Denmark) Mariann Gajhede
MF	3	(Australia) Alison Forman (c)
MF	10	(Denmark) Christina Bonde
MF	11	(Australia) Sharon Black
MF	12	(Denmark) Janne Madsen	(yellow card) 51'
FW	5	(United States) Stacey Peterson		(substituted off) 69'
FW	6	(Denmark) Lene Madsen		(substituted off) 64'
FW	13	(Denmark) Johanna Rasmussen		(substituted off) 84'
Substitutes:
GK	20	(Denmark) Susanne Graversen
DF	4	(Denmark) Hanne Sand Christensen		(substituted in) 69'
DF	17	(Republic of Ireland) Ciara McCormack
MF	15	(Denmark) Hanne Jensen
MF	8	(Denmark) May Krøgh Christensen		(substituted in) 64'
FW	23	(Denmark) Tanja Christensen		(substituted in) 84'
Manager:
(Denmark) Steen Refsgaard

Assistant referees:
Inka Müller (Germany)
Christine Beck (Germany)
Fourth official:
Rakel Backström (Sweden)

Match rules

- 90 minutes.
- 30 minutes of golden goal extra time if necessary.
- Penalty shoot-out if scores still level.
- Six named substitutes.
- Maximum of three substitutes.

==== Second leg ====
21 June 2003
16:00 CEST

Fortuna Hjørring (Denmark)	0–3	(Sweden) Umeå
	Report	Moström 3' (pen.); Kalmari 35'; Ljungberg 71'

Hjørring Stadium, Hjørring
Attendance: 2,119
Referee: Wendy Toms (England)

Fortuna Hjørring	Umeå

GK	1	(Denmark) Dorthe Larsen
DF	2	(Denmark) Anne-Mette Christensen
DF	7	(Denmark) Birgit Christensen
DF	14	(Denmark) Mariann Gajhede		(substituted off) 82'
MF	3	(Australia) Alison Forman (c)
MF	10	(Denmark) Christine Bonde
MF	11	(Australia) Sharon Black
MF	12	(Denmark) Janne Madsen		(substituted off) 46'
FW	6	(Denmark) Lene Madsen		(substituted off) 73'
FW	4	(Denmark) Hanne Sand Christensen	(yellow card) 5'
FW	8	(Denmark) May Krøgh Christensen	(yellow card) 26'
Substitutes:
GK	20	(Denmark) Susanne Graversen
DF	17	(Republic of Ireland) Ciara McCormack
FW	5	(United States) Stacey Peterson		(substituted in) 82'
FW	13	(Denmark) Johanna Rasmussen		(substituted in) 46'
FW	23	(Denmark) Tanja Christensen		(substituted in) 73'
Manager:
(Denmark) Steen Refsgaard

GK	1	(Sweden) Sofia Lundgren
DF	5	(Sweden) Maria Bergkvist
DF	4	(Sweden) Hanna Marklund
DF	13	(Sweden) Sofia Eriksson		(substituted off) 78'
DF	15	(Finland) Sanna Valkonen
DF	18	(Sweden) Linda Dahlqvist
MF	6	(Sweden) Malin Moström (c)
MF	9	(Sweden) Anna Sjöström		(substituted off) 78'
MF	86	(Sweden) Frida Östberg	(yellow card) 22'
FW	10	(Sweden) Hanna Ljungberg
FW	21	(Finland) Laura Kalmari		(substituted off) 81'
Substitutes:
GK	20	(Sweden) Ulrika Karlsson
DF	2	(Sweden) Anna Paulson
MF	11	(Sweden) Lotta Runesson		(substituted in) 78'
MF	14	(Sweden) Madelene Göras
FW	7	(Sweden) Maria Nordbrandt		(substituted in) 78'
FW	16	(Sweden) Emma Lindqvist		(substituted in) 81'
Manager:
(Sweden) Richard Holmlund

Assistant referees:
Amy Fearn (England)
Alison Chapman (England)
Fourth official:
Torben Jensen (Denmark)

Match rules

- 90 minutes.
- 30 minutes of golden goal extra time if necessary.
- Penalty shoot-out if scores still level.
- Maximum of three substitutes.
