= Olmos =

Olmos, which means elm trees in Spanish, may refer to:

- Olmos District, a district in Peru
- Olmos, Peru, a populated place in Peru
- Los Olmos, a town in Aragón, Spain
- Olmos, Uruguay, a town in Canelones Department, Uruguay

== People with the surname ==
- Alberto Olmos (born 1975), Spanish writer
- Andrés de Olmos (c. 1485–1571), first European grammarian of Nahuatl, Totonac and Huasteco
- Bodie Olmos (born 1975), American actor, son of Edward James
- Carlos Chanfon Olmos (1928–2002), Mexican architect and professor
- Edgar Olmos (born 1990), American baseball player
- Edward James Olmos (born 1947), Mexican-American actor
- Giuliana Olmos (born 1993), Mexican tennis player
- Graciela Olmos (1895–1962), a.k.a. La Bandida, Mexican singer-songwriter, soldier, alcohol trafficker, prostitute, pimp, and businesswoman
- Jesús Olmos (1910–1988), Mexican basketball player
- Joaquín Olmos (1915–2002), Spanish cyclist
- Julia Olmos (born 1983), Spanish footballer
- Juvenal Olmos (born 1962), Chilean footballer and manager
- Kelly Olmos (born 1952), Argentine economist and politician
- Matthew Paul Olmos (born 1977), Mexican-American playwright
- Paco Olmos (born 1970), Spanish basketball coach
- Paula Olmos (born 1982), Chilean politician
- Pedro Olmos Muñoz (1911–1991), Chilean painter and illustrator
- Roger Olmos (born 1975), Spanish illustrator
- Sabina Olmos (1913–1999), Argentine film actress
- Tony Olmos, Mexican-American filmmaker
- Walter Olmos (1982–2002), Argentine singer.

== See also ==
- Olmos Park, Texas
