= Checca =

Checca may refer to:

- Checca, Peru
- Checca District, Peru
