= Chamot =

Chamot is a surname. Notable people with the surname include:

- Janine Chamot (born 1983), Swiss footballer
- José Chamot (born 1969), Argentine footballer and manager
- Mary Chamot (1899–1993), English art historian and museum curator
