= Army of One (The Sopranos) =

- The Sopranos episode
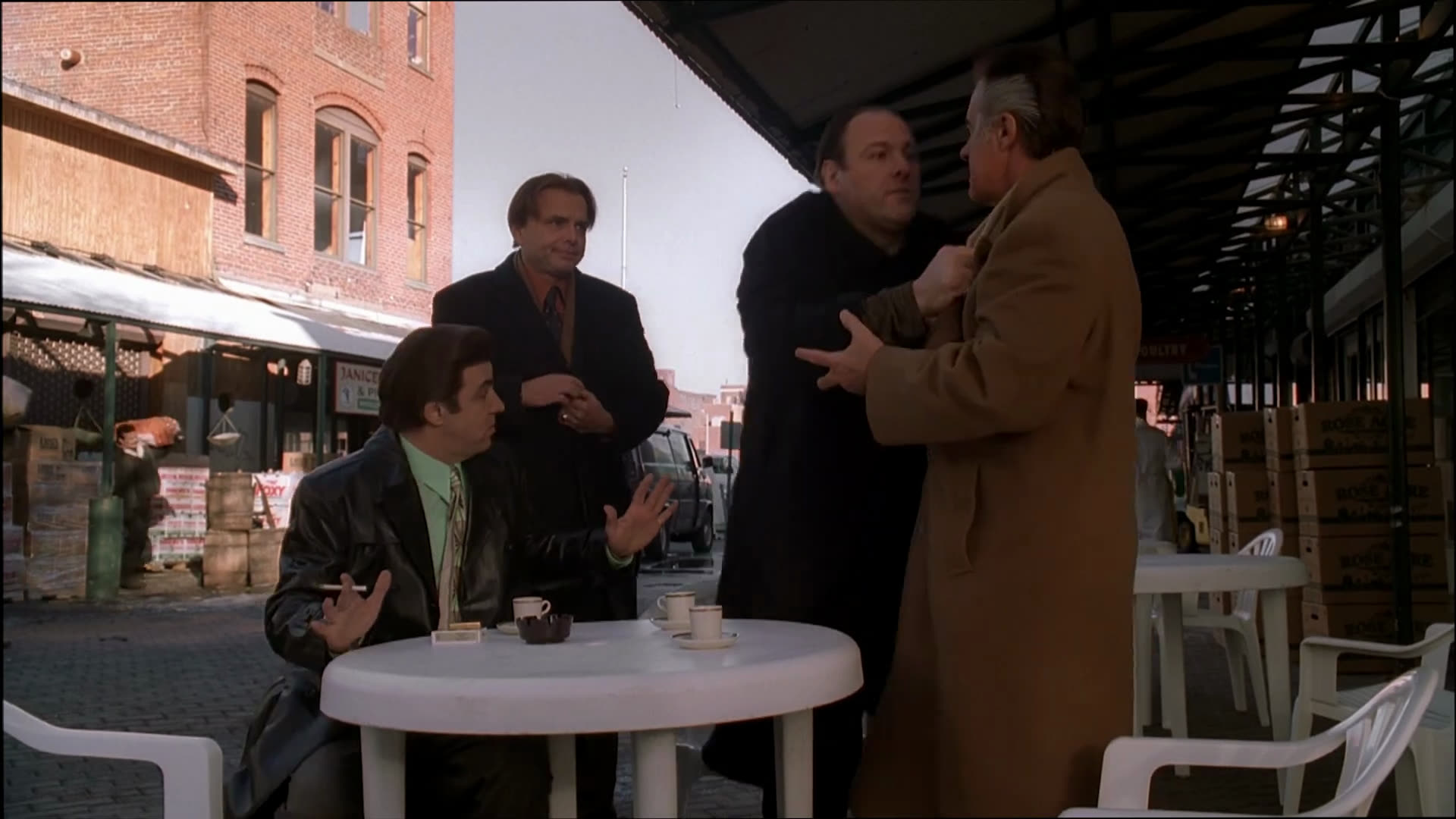
- Tony Soprano mediating a dispute between Paulie Gualtieri and Ralph Cifaretto
- Episode no.: Season 3 Episode 13
- Directed by: John Patterson
- Written by: David Chase; Lawrence Konner
- Cinematography by: Phil Abraham
- Production code: 313
- Original air date: May 20, 2001
- Running time: 60 minutes

Episode chronology
← Previous "Amour Fou"	Next → "For All Debts Public and Private"
- The Sopranos season 3

"Army of One" is the 39th episode of the HBO original series The Sopranos and the finale of the show's third season. It was written by David Chase and Lawrence Konner, and directed by John Patterson, and originally aired on May 20, 2001.

== Starring ==
- James Gandolfini as Tony Soprano
- Lorraine Bracco as Dr. Jennifer Melfi
- Edie Falco as Carmela Soprano
- Michael Imperioli as Christopher Moltisanti
- Dominic Chianese as Corrado Soprano, Jr.
- Steven Van Zandt as Silvio Dante
- Tony Sirico as Paulie Gualtieri
- Jamie-Lynn Sigler as Meadow Soprano
- Robert Iler as Anthony Soprano, Jr.
- Drea de Matteo as Adriana La Cerva
- Aida Turturro as Janice Soprano
- John Ventimiglia as Artie Bucco
- Federico Castelluccio as Furio Giunta
- Robert Funaro as Eugene Pontecorvo
- Kathrine Narducci as Charmaine Bucco
- Steven R. Schirripa as Bobby Baccalieri
- Joe Pantoliano as Ralph Cifaretto

=== Guest starring ===
- Sharon Angela as Rosalie Aprile
- Tobin Bell as Major Carl Zwingli
- Denise Borino as Ginny Sacrimoni
- Jason Cerbone as Jackie Aprile, Jr.
- Vince Curatola as Johnny Sack
- Frances Ensemplare as Marianucci Gualtieri
- Joseph R. Gannascoli as Vito Spatafore
- Lola Glaudini as Agent Deborah Ciccerone
- Dan Grimaldi as Patsy Parisi
- Melissa Marsala as Kelli Aprile
- Frank Pando as Agent Grasso
- Frank Pellegrino as Bureau Chief Frank Cubitoso
- Matt Servitto as Agent Dwight Harris
- Maureen Van Zandt as Gabriella Dante
- Michael K. Williams as Ray-Ray

== Synopsis ==
A.J. is expelled from high school for stealing answers to a geometry test, prompting Tony to angrily decide to send him to military school. A.J. is interviewed by the administrator of the school, who explains the rigorous schedule for students. Carmela believes they will train him to be a "professional killer"; Tony counters that he will be learning discipline and respect. As A.J. prepares to leave home, he puts on his uniform; both parents admire his appearance, but he looks at himself in the mirror and, in tears, asks not to be sent away. As his mother is adjusting his uniform, he suffers a panic attack and collapses. Tony tells Dr. Melfi that his son has inherited his "putrid genes", and he cannot be sent to military school.

Seeking intelligence about the DiMeo crime family, the FBI decide to go through a woman and send Agent Deborah Ciccerone on an undercover mission to befriend Adriana. Danielle, as she calls herself, easily gets talking to Adriana in a dress shop.

Paulie is in dispute with Ralphie about the division of proceeds from a robbery and insists on a sit-down. He claims $50,000; to his shock and dismay, Tony awards him only $12,000. Paulie later speaks quietly to Johnny about his dissatisfaction with Tony, and offers his services to Johnny's boss, Carmine Lupertazzi Sr.

Jackie Jr. is forced into hiding at a Boonton housing project after his failed robbery at Eugene's poker game. He calls Tony, pleading for help; Tony rebuffs him. Tony again expresses his confidence to Ralphie that, as captain, he knows what to do, but he must decide in a "timely fashion". When Jackie leaves the apartment for a walk, he is shot in the back of the head by Vito. It is said that he was killed by drug dealers.

At Jackie's visitation, Meadow cries uncontrollably when she sees him in his casket. Tony and Carmela are embarrassed when Rosalie notes the low attendance rate; the funeral has coincided with Super Bowl Sunday, a busy betting time. At the funeral, Silvio and Christopher are arrested for illegal gambling. During the reception at Rosalie's, Meadow and Kelli, Rosalie's daughter, argue bitterly about who killed Jackie. Despite the presence of a third person who is not a member of an organized-crime family, Kelli says emphatically that he was killed by an Italian. Loyal to her family, Meadow claims it was by a black drug-dealer.

At the wake at Nuovo Vesuvio, Silvio and Chris enter, having quickly made bail. Ralphie has begun to distance himself from Rosalie; he and Janice ostentatiously embrace. Junior, no longer under house arrest, sings the Italian love song "Core 'ngrato", moving some of the men to tears. After getting drunk, Meadow throws pieces of bread at Junior while he is singing, then quickly leaves when her father notices. Tony confronts her in the street; she tearfully denounces the funeral proceedings as "bullshit" and runs away. Tony returns to the funeral and puts his arms round A.J. and Carmela as they listen to Junior sing.

== Title references ==
- "An Army of One" was a slogan used in United States Army recruitment advertisements in the early 2000s, and was discussed by the Sopranos when they met with officials at the military school A.J. may attend.

== First appearances ==
- Agent Deborah Ciccerone: An F.B.I. agent assigned to go undercover and become Adriana's "new best friend".
- Marianucci Gualtieri: Paulie's mother who moves into Green Grove nursing home.

== Deceased ==
- Jackie Aprile, Jr.: shot in the back of the head by Vito Spatafore on the orders of Ralph Cifaretto.

== Production ==
- Super Bowl XXXV is referenced throughout the episode between the New York Giants and Baltimore Ravens (heard being discussed on a television pregame show and the radio). This establishes the events as occurring in late January 2001.
- This is the last episode to feature the World Trade Center in the title sequence due to the subsequent terrorist attacks.
- The episode initially aired with Fairuza Balk in the role of Agent Deborah Ciccerone until she was recast; the scenes were replaced on re-runs and the VHS and DVD releases.

== References to prior episodes ==
- Tony and Carmela watch a commercial for Dr. Fried's urology clinic, whose production was featured in the previous episode, "Amour Fou". Dr. Fried tends to Furio's gun injury.
- In a scene where Tony and Carmela are having a fight, she says that "boys his age still kill frogs and small animals." Tony wonders if it could have been A.J. who blew up the Cusamanos' "Binky" with a cherry bomb. A.J. admitted blowing up frogs with explosives in the season one episode "Meadowlands."

== Cultural references ==
- In the opening scene, A.J. reads an issue of the comic book Freex.
- When Tony saw A. J. in full uniform, he remarks: "Sgt. Bilko!"
- As people notice her throwing bread during Junior's song, Meadow sarcastically sings "Oops! I did it again" referencing the Britney Spears hit song.

== Music ==
- The organ music played during Jackie's wake is "Ombra mai fu" from Handel's opera Serse.
- When A.J. calls Meadow at Columbia, Creeper Lagoon's song "Wonderful Love" is playing in the background.
- During Jackie's wake, Junior's performance of "Core 'ngrato" ("Ungrateful Heart") was sung by Dominic Chianese himself.
- The song sung by Junior before "Core 'ngrato", while he is at the table, is "Malafemmena".
- The French song that follows "Core 'ngrato" ("Ungrateful Heart") is "Parlez-moi d'amour" performed by Lucienne Boyer and written by Jean Lenoir.
- The song in Spanish that follows the French version of "Core 'ngrato" ("Ungrateful Heart") is "La Enramada" a Bolero written by Graciela Olmos and performed by Los Tres Ases (The Three Aces).
- The song played over the end credits is "#8" (unofficially titled [blur] aka [circles]) by Aphex Twin, from his album, Selected Ambient Works Volume II.
- As Meadow is tossing bread at Junior, Meadow sings a line from Britney Spears' song, "Oops!... I Did It Again" (the original recording of that song was previously featured in "Employee of the Month").
- The song that follows Lucienne Boyer's "Parlez-moi d'amour" is "Wondering" by American music composer and director Nathan Wang.
