= Von Siebenthal =

Von Siebenthal is a surname. Notable people with the surname include:

- Béatrice von Siebenthal (born 1964), Swiss football manager
- Erich von Siebenthal (born 1958), Swiss farmer and politician
- Hermann von Siebenthal (1934–2014), Swiss equestrian
- Nathalie von Siebenthal (born 1993), Swiss cross-country skier
- Stefanie von Siebenthal (born 1977), Swiss snowboarder
- Walter von Siebenthal (1899–1958), Swiss ice hockey player
