= Checca District =

Coordinates: 14.4734°S 71.3954°W

Checca Ch'iqa
- District
- Location of Checca in the Canas province
- Country: Peru
- Region: Cusco
- Province: Canas
- Founded: January 2, 1857
- Capital: Checca

Government
  - Mayor: Pablo Cesar Chaiña Carpio (2007)

Area
  - Total: 503.76 km^{2} (194.50 sq mi)
- Elevation: 3,810 m (12,500 ft)

Population (2005 census)
  - Total: 6,490
  - Density: 12.9/km^{2} (33.4/sq mi)
- Time zone: UTC-5 (PET)
- UBIGEO: 080502
- Website: munichecca.gob.pe

Checca District is the largest of eight districts in the Canas Province in Peru. Its seat is Checca.

== Geography ==
One of the highest peaks of the district is Anta Qalla at approximately 4,600 m (15,100 ft). Other mountains are listed below:

- Ararankha
- Iruni
- Kiska Muqu
- Marka Marka
- Saywa
- Suntur Uta
- Sura Tira
- Tuqtu
- Urqu K'uchu
- Wanqarani
- Yuraq Q'asa

== Ethnic groups ==
The people in the district are mainly indigenous citizens of Quechua descent. Quechua is the language which the majority of the population (98.68%) learnt to speak in childhood, 1.10% of the residents started speaking using the Spanish language (2007 Peru Census).
