= List of populated places in Peru =

This is a list of populated places in Peru. It was initially derived from the Geonames database of all populated places with a population of at least 1,000 in Peru.

Location	Region	Coordinates (links to map & photo sources)	Population	Elevation	Notes
Abancay	Apurímac	13.63389°S 72.88139°W	55,111	2,690 m (8,830 ft)	
Acarí	Arequipa	15.43111°S 74.61583°W	4,445	410 m (1,350 ft)	
Acolla	Junín	11.73193°S 75.54634°W	6,805	3,862 m (12,671 ft)	
Aguas Verdes	Tumbes	3.48139°S 80.245°W	9,106	15 m (49 ft)	
Ambo	Huanuco	10.13083°S 76.20472°W	6,865	2,486 m (8,156 ft)	
Andahuaylas	Apurímac	13.65556°S 73.38722°W	17,444	3,052 m (10,013 ft)	
Anta	Cusco	13.47056°S 72.14833°W	5,859	3,447 m (11,309 ft)	
Arequipa	Arequipa	16.39889°S 71.535°W	841,130	2,397 m (7,864 ft)	
Ascope	La Libertad	7.71444°S 79.10778°W	14,015	191 m (627 ft)	
Atuncolla	Puno	15.68333°S 70.15°W	12,654	3,897 m (12,785 ft)	
Ayabaca	Piura	4.63983°S 79.71491°W	5,270	2,317 m (7,602 ft)	
Ayacucho	Ayacucho	13.15833°S 74.22389°W	140,033	2,819 m (9,249 ft)	
Ayaviri	Puno	14.88639°S 70.58889°W	19,310	3,919 m (12,858 ft)	
Ayna	Ayacucho	12.65°S 73.91667°W	4,588	2,425 m (7,956 ft)	
Azángaro	Puno	14.91667°S 70.21667°W	13,290	4,020 m (13,190 ft)	
Bagua Grande	Amazonas	5.75611°S 78.44111°W	20,382	746 m (2,448 ft)	
Bambamarca	Cajamarca	6.68333°S 78.53333°W	13,351	2,699 m (8,855 ft)	
Barranca	Loreto	4.83333°S 76.7°W	5,779	149 m (489 ft)	
Barranca	Lima	10.75°S 77.76667°W	46,290	64 m (210 ft)	
Bellavista	San Martín	7.05614°S 76.5911°W	15,231	298 m (978 ft)	
Bellavista	Cajamarca	5.66417°S 78.67722°W	6,320	511 m (1,677 ft)	
Bernal	Piura	5.45°S 80.75°W	5,916	4 m (13 ft)	
Buenos Aires	Piura	5.26083°S 79.96417°W	7,932	146 m (479 ft)	
Cahuanuyo	Cusco	14.34111°S 71.46944°W	3,935	3,982 m (13,064 ft)	
Cajabamba	Cajamarca	7.61667°S 78.05°W	13,486	3,078 m (10,098 ft)	
Cajamarca	Cajamarca	7.16378°S 78.50027°W	135,000	2,609 m (8,560 ft)	
Cajaruro	Amazonas	5.73639°S 78.42556°W	7,281	893 m (2,930 ft)	
Calca	Cusco	13.33333°S 71.95°W	9,179	3,181 m (10,436 ft)	
Caleta de Carquín	Lima	11.0925°S 77.62667°W	5,514	16 m (52 ft)	
Callanca	Cusco	14.17944°S 71.14028°W	4,046	4,281 m (14,045 ft)	
Callao	Callao	12.06667°S 77.15°W	813,264	1 m (3 ft 3 in)	
Camaná	Arequipa	16.62278°S 72.71111°W	16,434	52 m (171 ft)	
Campoverde	Ucayali	8.47528°S 74.80583°W	8,945	173 m (568 ft)	
Candarave	Tacna	17.26778°S 70.24944°W	3,415	3,077 m (10,095 ft)	
Carás	Ancash	9.04667°S 77.81139°W	10,926	2,441 m (8,009 ft)	
Carhuamayo	Junín	10.91667°S 76.03333°W	9,122	4,000 m (13,000 ft)	
Carhuaz	Ancash	9.28194°S 77.64472°W	5,044	2,864 m (9,396 ft)	
Cascas	Cajamarca	7.48333°S 78.81667°W	4,299	1,562 m (5,125 ft)	
Catacaos	Piura	5.26667°S 80.68333°W	57,304	11 m (36 ft)	
Ccaquiracunca	Cusco	14.27861°S 71.44944°W	4,098	4,233 m (13,888 ft)	
Ccolo	Arequipa	15.50583°S 71.49167°W	3,857	3,803 m (12,477 ft)	
Ccuntuma	Cusco	14.12611°S 71.41111°W	3,511	3,676 m (12,060 ft)	
Celendín	Cajamarca	6.87028°S 78.15167°W	14,660	2,953 m (9,688 ft)	
Cerro de Pasco	Pasco	10.68333°S 76.26667°W	78,910	4,363 m (14,314 ft)	
Chachapoyas	Amazonas	6.23169°S 77.86903°W	20,279	1,851 m (6,073 ft)	
Chancay	Lima	11.57139°S 77.26722°W	26,958	77 m (253 ft)	
Chaupimarca	Pasco	10.43333°S 76.53333°W	28,666	3,456 m (11,339 ft)	
Chazuta	San Martín	6.57417°S 76.13667°W	8,029	246 m (807 ft)	
Checacupe	Cusco	14.02694°S 71.45278°W	3,440	3,716 m (12,192 ft)	
Checca	Cusco	14.47278°S 71.39389°W	3,810	3,991 m (13,094 ft)	
Chepén	La Libertad	7.21667°S 79.45°W	41,992	77 m (253 ft)	
Chicama	La Libertad	7.84472°S 79.14694°W	14,915	160 m (520 ft)	
Chiclayo	Lambayeque	6.77361°S 79.84167°W	577,375	1 m (3 ft 3 in)	
Chignayhua	Cusco	14.24306°S 71.44194°W	3,912	3,971 m (13,028 ft)	
Chilca	Lima	12.52111°S 76.73722°W	12,884	78 m (256 ft)	
Chimbote	Ancash	9.08528°S 78.57833°W	316,966	1 m (3 ft 3 in)	
Chincha Alta	Ica	13.40985°S 76.13235°W	153,076	98 m (322 ft)	
Chipispaya	Tacna	17.49722°S 70.21611°W	1,932	2,066 m (6,778 ft)	
Chivay	Arequipa	15.63833°S 71.60111°W	4,543	3,842 m (12,605 ft)	
Chocope	La Libertad	7.79139°S 79.22167°W	32,370	119 m (390 ft)	
Chongoyape	Lambayeque	6.64056°S 79.38917°W	16,061	53 m (174 ft)	
Chosica	Lima	11.94306°S 76.70944°W	88,606	923 m (3,028 ft)	
Chota	Cajamarca	6.55°S 78.65°W	14,240	2,552 m (8,373 ft)	
Chulucanas	Piura	5.0925°S 80.1625°W	68,835	120 m (390 ft)	
Chupaca	Junín	12.06667°S 75.28333°W	9,877	3,352 m (10,997 ft)	
Chuquitira	Tacna	17.28778°S 70.045°W	4,220	4,514 m (14,810 ft)	
Cocachacra	Arequipa	17.08833°S 71.7575°W	8,799	119 m (390 ft)	
Coishco	Ancash	9.02306°S 78.61556°W	15,083	157 m (515 ft)	
Combapata	Cusco	14.10111°S 71.42944°W	3,472	3,689 m (12,103 ft)	
Concepción	Junín	11.91811°S 75.31173°W	11,330	3,965 m (13,009 ft)	
Conchopata	Cusco	14.47111°S 71.19806°W	3,977	3,891 m (12,766 ft)	
Contamana	Loreto	7.33333°S 75.01667°W	13,885	157 m (515 ft)	
Coracora	Ayacucho	15.03333°S 73.78333°W	7,420	3,359 m (11,020 ft)	
Cullcuyre	Cusco	14.09333°S 71.3325°W	3,593	3,859 m (12,661 ft)	
Cusco	Cusco	13.51833°S 71.97806°W	312,140	3,360 m (11,020 ft)	
Desaguadero	Puno	16.56556°S 69.04167°W	5,329	3,674 m (12,054 ft)	
El Alto	Piura	4.27139°S 81.21472°W	9,303	209 m (686 ft)	
Eten	Lambayeque	6.90806°S 79.86417°W	13,693	9 m (30 ft)	
Ferreñafe	Lambayeque	6.63889°S 79.78889°W	34,357	127 m (417 ft)	
Guadalupe	La Libertad	7.25°S 79.48333°W	25,376	83 m (272 ft)	
Hacienda Huancane	Puno	15.82222°S 70.88556°W	7,831	4,524 m (14,843 ft)	
Huacho	Lima	11.10667°S 77.605°W	54,545	61 m (200 ft)	
Hualmay	Lima	11.09639°S 77.61389°W	26,658	40 m (130 ft)	
Huamachuco	La Libertad	7.8°S 78.06667°W	21,768	3,072 m (10,079 ft)	
Huancabamba	Piura	5.23861°S 79.45056°W	8,553	2,112 m (6,929 ft)	
Huancavelica	Huancavelica	12.76667°S 74.98333°W	41,576	3,981 m (13,061 ft)	
Huancayo	Junín	12.06667°S 75.23333°W	376,657	3,496 m (11,470 ft)	
Huanta	Ayacucho	12.93333°S 74.25°W	18,627	2,943 m (9,656 ft)	
Huánuco	Huanuco	9.9329°S 76.24153°W	147,959	1,795 m (5,889 ft)	
Huaral	Lima	11.495°S 77.20778°W	62,174	221 m (725 ft)	
Huarancante	Arequipa	15.76806°S 71.45972°W	4,638	4,571 m (14,997 ft)	
Huaraz	Ancash	9.53333°S 77.53333°W	86,934	2,829 m (9,281 ft)	
Huarichancara	Arequipa	15.63972°S 71.06111°W	4,445	4,264 m (13,990 ft)	
Huarmey	Ancash	10.06806°S 78.15222°W	16,172	105 m (344 ft)	
Huasahuasi	Junín	11.31667°S 75.61667°W	5,146	2,447 m (8,028 ft)	
Huaura	Lima	11.07°S 77.59944°W	20,723	42 m (138 ft)	
Huayna Alcalde	Cusco	14.26528°S 71.08167°W	4,298	4,267 m (13,999 ft)	
Huayucachi	Junín	12.13333°S 75.23333°W	5,827	3,121 m (10,240 ft)	
Huicungo	San Martín	7.28333°S 76.8°W	6,757	345 m (1,132 ft)	
Iberia	Madre de Dios	11.35°S 69.58333°W	4,386	236 m (774 ft)	
Ica	Ica	14.06528°S 75.73083°W	246,844	423 m (1,388 ft)	
Ilabaya	Tacna	17.42083°S 70.51333°W	9,492	1,482 m (4,862 ft)	
Ilave	Puno	16.08333°S 69.66667°W	16,033	3,844 m (12,612 ft)	
Ilo	Moquegua	17.63944°S 71.3375°W	53,476	117 m (384 ft)	
Imperial	Lima	13.05927°S 76.35269°W	32,344	100 m (330 ft)	
Independencia	Lima	11.99°S 77.04583°W	3,987	390 m (1,280 ft)	
Iquitos	Loreto	3.74806°S 73.24722°W	437,620	107 m (351 ft)	
Jaén	Cajamarca	5.70806°S 78.80472°W	52,493	840 m (2,760 ft)	
Jatun Orcochiri	Arequipa	15.75°S 71.34667°W	4,358	4,258 m (13,970 ft)	
Jauja	Junín	11.77584°S 75.49656°W	21,057	3,769 m (12,365 ft)	
Jayanca	Lambayeque	6.39083°S 79.82194°W	6,126	116 m (381 ft)	
Jayobamba	Cusco	14.09417°S 71.33861°W	3,593	3,687 m (12,096 ft)	
Jayune	Arequipa	15.56333°S 71.30306°W	4,256	4,459 m (14,629 ft)	
Jepelacio	San Martín	6.11667°S 76.95°W	7,150	852 m (2,795 ft)	
Juanjuí	San Martín	7.17785°S 76.73135°W	37,715	303 m (994 ft)	
Juli	Puno	16.21667°S 69.45°W	7,309	4,102 m (13,458 ft)	
Juliaca	Puno	15.5°S 70.13333°W	245,675	3,894 m (12,776 ft)	
Junín	Junín	11.15889°S 75.99306°W	15,320	3,999 m (13,120 ft)	
La Breita	Piura	4.26083°S 80.8875°W	17,693	291 m (955 ft)	
La Huaca	Piura	4.91167°S 80.96°W	8,468	24 m (79 ft)	
La Oroya	Junín	11.51893°S 75.89935°W	33,345	4,000 m (13,000 ft)	
La Peca	Amazonas	5.61111°S 78.435°W	27,045	1,143 m (3,750 ft)	
La Rinconada	Puno	14.63126°S 69.44638°W	29,678	5,050 m (16,570 ft)	
La Unión	Huanuco	9.82907°S 76.8018°W	4,788	4,007 m (13,146 ft)	
La Unión	Piura	5.4°S 80.75°W	34,834	6 m (20 ft)	
Lagunas	Loreto	5.22694°S 75.67528°W	9,197	149 m (489 ft)	
Lamas	San Martín	6.41667°S 76.53333°W	13,693	764 m (2,507 ft)	
Lambayeque	Lambayeque	6.70111°S 79.90611°W	43,710	2 m (6 ft 7 in)	
Lampa	Puno	15.35°S 70.36667°W	4,780	3,927 m (12,884 ft)	
Langui	Cusco	14.43194°S 71.27306°W	3,969	3,908 m (12,822 ft)	
Laredo	La Libertad	8.08965°S 78.9602°W	24,691	74 m (243 ft)	
Las Lomas	Piura	4.65333°S 80.24667°W	9,450	250 m (820 ft)	
Layo	Cusco	14.49361°S 71.155°W	3,978	3,939 m (12,923 ft)	
Lima	N/A (Lima Province)	12.04318°S 77.02824°W	7,737,002	181 m (594 ft)	
Lima Pampa	Cusco	14.08861°S 71.33722°W	3,569	3,812 m (12,507 ft)	
Llata	Huanuco	9.41667°S 76.78333°W	4,585	2,999 m (9,839 ft)	
Llongasora	Arequipa	15.63917°S 71.29972°W	4,753	4,568 m (14,987 ft)	
Lluta	Arequipa	16.01472°S 72.01417°W	5,998	2,990 m (9,810 ft)	
Los Aquijes	Ica	14.09667°S 75.69083°W	7,848	457 m (1,499 ft)	
Macusani	Puno	14.08333°S 70.43333°W	6,044	4,058 m (13,314 ft)	
Mala	Lima	12.65806°S 76.63083°W	17,260	130 m (430 ft)	
Máncora	Piura	4.10778°S 81.0475°W	9,101	26 m (85 ft)	
Maranganí	Cusco	14.35778°S 71.16861°W	3,709	3,965 m (13,009 ft)	
Marcavelica	Piura	4.87778°S 80.70528°W	25,645	65 m (213 ft)	
Matucana	Lima	11.85°S 76.4°W	4,517	2,801 m (9,190 ft)	
Mazamari	Junín	11.32583°S 74.53083°W	6,826	805 m (2,641 ft)	
Minas de Marcona	Ica	15.21194°S 75.11028°W	15,478	789 m (2,589 ft)	
Moche	La Libertad	8.17111°S 79.00917°W	22,581	109 m (358 ft)	
Mochumí	Lambayeque	6.54694°S 79.86306°W	7,460	151 m (495 ft)	
Mollendo	Arequipa	17.02306°S 72.01472°W	28,953	1 m (3 ft 3 in)	
Monsefú	Lambayeque	6.87806°S 79.87222°W	25,707	1 m (3 ft 3 in)	
Moquegua	Moquegua	17.19556°S 70.93528°W	54,517	1,481 m (4,859 ft)	
Morococha	Junín	11.59972°S 76.14111°W	7,890	4,123 m (13,527 ft)	
Mórrope	Lambayeque	6.54167°S 80.01111°W	6,662	116 m (381 ft)	
Morropón	Piura	5.18222°S 79.96889°W	12,307	161 m (528 ft)	
Mosoc Cancha	Cusco	14.28444°S 71.0725°W	4,450	4,465 m (14,649 ft)	
Mosoc Llacta	Cusco	14.12°S 71.47278°W	3,802	3,802 m (12,474 ft)	
Motupe	Lambayeque	6.15194°S 79.71417°W	13,681	168 m (551 ft)	
Moyobamba	San Martín	6.05°S 76.96667°W	44,276	760 m (2,490 ft)	
Nazca	Ica	14.83333°S 74.95°W	23,556	595 m (1,952 ft)	
Nicolas de Pierola	Lima	11.95°S 76.7°W	5,800	1,324 m (4,344 ft)	
Nuevo Imperial	Lima	13.07541°S 76.31719°W	32,344	160 m (520 ft)	
Ñuñoa	Puno	14.48°S 70.64111°W	4,271	4,181 m (13,717 ft)	
Ollantaytambo	Cusco	13.25722°S 72.26306°W	2,000	3,065 m (10,056 ft)	
Olmos	Lambayeque	5.98472°S 79.74528°W	9,800	230 m (750 ft)	
Orcopampa	Arequipa	15.26611°S 72.34167°W	5,643	3,898 m (12,789 ft)	
Orcotuna	Junín	11.96667°S 75.33333°W	4,199	4,022 m (13,196 ft)	
Oropesa	Cusco	13.59278°S 71.77194°W	4,022	3,277 m (10,751 ft)	
Otuzco	La Libertad	7.9°S 78.58333°W	10,134	2,692 m (8,832 ft)	
Oxapampa	Pasco	10.5775°S 75.40167°W	7,743	3,058 m (10,033 ft)	
Oyón	Lima	10.66806°S 76.77306°W	6,276	3,553 m (11,657 ft)	
Oyotún	Lambayeque	6.85194°S 79.30361°W	6,330	300 m (980 ft)	
Pacanga	La Libertad	7.16667°S 79.5°W	8,750	48 m (157 ft)	
Pacasmayo	La Libertad	7.40056°S 79.57139°W	29,165	3 m (9.8 ft)	
Pacocha	Moquegua	17.58333°S 71.33333°W	7,588	230 m (750 ft)	
Paiján	La Libertad	7.73333°S 79.30222°W	21,128	117 m (384 ft)	
Paita	Piura	5.08917°S 81.11444°W	56,151	1 m (3 ft 3 in)	
Palpa	Ica	14.53361°S 75.18556°W	5,883	404 m (1,325 ft)	
Pampamarca	Cusco	14.14639°S 71.45944°W	3,811	3,959 m (12,989 ft)	
Pampas	Huancavelica	12.4°S 74.9°W	5,521	3,967 m (13,015 ft)	
Pangoa	Cusco	12.11667°S 73°W	6,638	901 m (2,956 ft)	
Papayal	Tumbes	4.07611°S 80.73611°W	5,484	296 m (971 ft)	
Paracas	Ica	13.86667°S 76.26667°W	1,196	3 m (9.8 ft)	
Paramonga	Lima	10.66667°S 77.83333°W	27,631	41 m (135 ft)	
Pativilca	Lima	10.7°S 77.78333°W	13,583	106 m (348 ft)	
Perené	Junín	10.94917°S 75.22611°W	6,844	665 m (2,182 ft)	
Picota	San Martín	6.91969°S 76.33037°W	6,697	273 m (896 ft)	
Picsi	Lambayeque	6.71778°S 79.76972°W	4,966	60 m (200 ft)	
Pilcomay	Junín	12.05°S 75.26667°W	8,169	3,450 m (11,320 ft)	
Pimentel	Lambayeque	6.83667°S 79.93417°W	15,552	1 m (3 ft 3 in)	
Pisac	Cusco	13.4225°S 71.84667°W	2,000	3,216 m (10,551 ft)	
Pisco	Ica	13.7°S 76.21667°W	61,869	3 m (9.8 ft)	
Piura	Piura	5.2°S 80.63333°W	325,466	25 m (82 ft)	
Pomabamba	Ancash	8.83333°S 77.46667°W	4,453	3,352 m (10,997 ft)	
Pucallpa	Ucayali	8.37915°S 74.55387°W	310,750	158 m (518 ft)	
Pucara	Arequipa	15.98028°S 71.46056°W	4,335	4,473 m (14,675 ft)	
Pueblo Nuevo	La Libertad	7.18806°S 79.51528°W	5,766	1 m (3 ft 3 in)	
Pueblo Nuevo	Lambayeque	5.71667°S 79.88333°W	12,471	168 m (551 ft)	
Puerto Maldonado	Madre de Dios	12.6°S 69.18333°W	37,543	193 m (633 ft)	
Puerto Santa	Ancash	8.99056°S 78.64556°W	14,066	2 m (6 ft 7 in)	
Puerto Supe	Lima	10.81667°S 77.75°W	11,450	63 m (207 ft)	
Pujocucho	Tacna	17.15778°S 70.35222°W	4,120	3,955 m (12,976 ft)	
Puno	Puno	15.83333°S 70.03333°W	116,552	3,792 m (12,441 ft)	
Punta de Bombón	Arequipa	17.17167°S 71.79306°W	6,336	25 m (82 ft)	
Puquio	Ayacucho	14.7°S 74.13333°W	10,491	3,107 m (10,194 ft)	
Putina	Puno	15.46667°S 69.43333°W	8,118	3,926 m (12,881 ft)	
Qquea	Cusco	14.05417°S 71.38583°W	3,482	4,209 m (13,809 ft)	
Querecotillo	Piura	4.83778°S 80.64556°W	25,396	76 m (249 ft)	
Queromarca	Cusco	14.1825°S 71.38444°W	3,496	3,557 m (11,670 ft)	
Quilahuani	Tacna	17.31778°S 70.25806°W	3,176	2,820 m (9,250 ft)	
Quilmaná	Lima	12.95°S 76.38333°W	6,442	210 m (690 ft)	
Quiruvilca	La Libertad	7.96667°S 78.2°W	9,226	3,940 m (12,930 ft)	
Ramón Castilla	Loreto	4.25694°S 69.95944°W	5,495	84 m (276 ft)	
Reque	Lambayeque	6.86556°S 79.81778°W	9,808	28 m (92 ft)	
Ricardo Palma	Lima	11.91806°S 76.66639°W	4,842	1,248 m (4,094 ft)	
Río Grande	Ica	14.51972°S 75.20139°W	4,689	368 m (1,207 ft)	
Rioja	San Martín	6.05861°S 77.165°W	25,057	789 m (2,589 ft)	
Salaverry	La Libertad	8.23333°S 78.96667°W	10,066	70 m (230 ft)	
Salinera Colán	Piura	5.03333°S 81.06667°W	14,210	1 m (3 ft 3 in)	
Salitral	Piura	4.85722°S 80.68111°W	5,385	71 m (233 ft)	
San Agustin	Junín	11.99219°S 75.24528°W	5,998	3,964 m (13,005 ft)	
San Bartolo	Lima	12.38333°S 76.78333°W	5,733	72 m (236 ft)	
San Clemente	Ica	13.66667°S 76.15°W	15,815	72 m (236 ft)	
San Ignacio	Cajamarca	5.14583°S 79.00139°W	7,912	1,258 m (4,127 ft)	
San Isidro	Lima	12.11667°S 77.05°W	68,309	32 m (105 ft)	
San Jerónimo	Apurímac	13.65028°S 73.365°W	5,609	3,017 m (9,898 ft)	
San Jerónimo	Junín	11.94717°S 75.28293°W	8,772	4,005 m (13,140 ft)	
San José	Lambayeque	6.7425°S 79.82917°W	7,434	1 m (3 ft 3 in)	
San José de Sisa	San Martín	6.61674°S 76.69146°W	9,477	536 m (1,759 ft)	
San Juan Bautista	Ica	14.01083°S 75.73583°W	6,871	420 m (1,380 ft)	
San Luis	Lima	12.06667°S 77°W	8,862	220 m (720 ft)	
San Miguel	Ayacucho	13.0125°S 73.98083°W	6,303	2,717 m (8,914 ft)	
San Miguel de Cauri	Huanuco	10.1°S 76.58333°W	5,326	4,064 m (13,333 ft)	
San Pablo	Cusco	14.20278°S 71.31556°W	3,486	3,618 m (11,870 ft)	
San Pedro De Cachora	Apurímac	13.63333°S 72.88333°W		2,772 m (9,094 ft)	
San Pedro de Cajas	Junín	11.25111°S 75.86167°W	5,758	3,995 m (13,107 ft)	
San Pedro de Lloc	La Libertad	7.43278°S 79.50583°W	16,250	1 m (3 ft 3 in)	
San Ramón	Junín	11.12139°S 75.35306°W	14,708	776 m (2,546 ft)	
San Vicente de Cañete	Lima	13.07512°S 76.38352°W	25,517	51 m (167 ft)	
Santa Ana	Cusco	12.86667°S 72.71667°W	25,145	857 m (2,812 ft)	
Santa Eulalia	Lima	11.85°S 76.68333°W	6,406	1,990 m (6,530 ft)	
Santa Lucía	Puno	15.7°S 70.60528°W	4,320	4,113 m (13,494 ft)	
Santa Maria	Lima	12°S 76.9°W	14,853	552 m (1,811 ft)	
Santa Rosa	Lambayeque	6.76667°S 79.83333°W	10,625	1 m (3 ft 3 in)	
Santiago	Ica	14.18861°S 75.71417°W	10,449	429 m (1,407 ft)	
Santiago de Cao	La Libertad	7.95889°S 79.23917°W	21,982	1 m (3 ft 3 in)	
Santiago de Chuco	La Libertad	8.15°S 78.18333°W	6,759	2,950 m (9,680 ft)	
Santo Tomas	Cusco	14.44556°S 72.08417°W	4,134	3,679 m (12,070 ft)	
Saposoa	San Martín	6.93395°S 76.77158°W	14,894	360 m (1,180 ft)	
Saquena	Loreto	4.66667°S 73.51667°W	4,362	113 m (371 ft)	
Satipo	Junín	11.25222°S 74.63861°W	15,532	627 m (2,057 ft)	
Sayán	Lima	11.13611°S 77.19333°W	6,196	961 m (3,153 ft)	
Sechura	Piura	5.55694°S 80.82222°W	23,020	1 m (3 ft 3 in)	
Sicaya	Junín	12.03333°S 75.28333°W	6,842	3,636 m (11,929 ft)	
Sicuani	Cusco	14.26944°S 71.22611°W	33,575	3,716 m (12,192 ft)	
Soritor	San Martín	6.13917°S 77.10389°W	10,858	846 m (2,776 ft)	
Subtanjalla	Ica	14.01889°S 75.75806°W	9,096	418 m (1,371 ft)	
Sullana	Piura	4.90389°S 80.68528°W	160,789	67 m (220 ft)	
Supe	Lima	10.8°S 77.73333°W	13,719	153 m (502 ft)	
Tabalosos	San Martín	6.35°S 76.68333°W	14,744	627 m (2,057 ft)	
Tacna	Tacna	18.00556°S 70.24833°W	280,098	601 m (1,972 ft)	
Talara	Piura	4.57722°S 81.27194°W	99,074	14 m (46 ft)	
Talavera	Apurímac	13.65306°S 73.42917°W	7,381	3,000 m (9,800 ft)	
Tambo	Ayacucho	14.8°S 73.91667°W	5,032	4,265 m (13,993 ft)	
Tambo Grande	Piura	4.92694°S 80.34472°W	30,033	96 m (315 ft)	
Tambopata	Madre de Dios	12.73333°S 69.18333°W	38,966	200 m (660 ft)	
Taquile	Puno	15.76667°S 69.68333°W	2,000	3,827 m (12,556 ft)	
Tarata	Tacna	17.47444°S 70.03278°W	3,052	3,329 m (10,922 ft)	
Tarma	Junín	11.41972°S 75.69083°W	51,350	4,058 m (13,314 ft)	
Tingo María	Huanuco	9.28951°S 76.00876°W	53,177	657 m (2,156 ft)	
Tinta	Cusco	14.145°S 71.40694°W	3,466	3,571 m (11,716 ft)	
Tinyahuarco	Pasco	10.75°S 76.3°W	5,066	3,734 m (12,251 ft)	
Tocache Nuevo	San Martín	8.18417°S 76.5125°W	29,029	457 m (1,499 ft)	
Torata	Moquegua	17.07694°S 70.84333°W	7,054	2,327 m (7,635 ft)	
Totoral	Tacna	17.40528°S 70.365°W	1,976	2,417 m (7,930 ft)	
Trujillo	La Libertad	8.11599°S 79.02998°W	747,450	36 m (118 ft)	
Túcume	Lambayeque	6.51°S 79.85833°W	7,043	149 m (489 ft)	
Tumbes	Tumbes	3.56667°S 80.44139°W	109,223	8 m (26 ft)	
Tungasuca	Cusco	14.16389°S 71.47667°W	3,791	3,950 m (12,960 ft)	
Uchiza	San Martín	8.45917°S 76.46333°W	17,742	615 m (2,018 ft)	
Urcos	Cusco	13.68611°S 71.62278°W	5,479	3,106 m (10,190 ft)	
Urubamba	Cusco	13.30472°S 72.11583°W	7,540	3,048 m (10,000 ft)	
Végueta	Lima	11.02306°S 77.64306°W	6,219	2 m (6 ft 7 in)	
Vice	Piura	5.41667°S 80.78333°W	12,915	9 m (30 ft)	
Villa Rica	Pasco	10.73944°S 75.26972°W	7,448	879 m (2,884 ft)	
Villa Tupac Amaru	Ica	13.7°S 76.15°W	11,159	81 m (266 ft)	
Virú	La Libertad	8.41667°S 78.75°W	20,774	65 m (213 ft)	
Vizcachane	Arequipa	15.80861°S 71.20111°W	4,407	4,529 m (14,859 ft)	
Yanacancha	Huanuco	10.24111°S 76.64556°W	23,175	3,986 m (13,077 ft)	
Yanahuanca	Pasco	10.51667°S 76.49861°W	5,992	3,441 m (11,289 ft)	
Yanaoca	Cusco	14.21806°S 71.43167°W	3,913	3,962 m (12,999 ft)	
Yauya	Ancash	8.98333°S 77.3°W	9,092	3,001 m (9,846 ft)	
Yungay	Ancash	9.13833°S 77.74361°W	5,269	2,787 m (9,144 ft)	
Yunguyo	Puno	16.25°S 69.08333°W	16,140	3,826 m (12,552 ft)	
Yura	Arequipa	16.25223°S 71.67969°W	5,686	2,694 m (8,839 ft)	
Yurimaguas	Loreto	5.9°S 76.08333°W	41,827	185 m (607 ft)	
Zaña	Lambayeque	6.92222°S 79.58417°W	39,200	95 m (312 ft)	
Zarumilla	Tumbes	3.50306°S 80.27306°W	16,907	35 m (115 ft)	
Zorritos	Tumbes	3.66667°S 80.66667°W	12,261	3 m (9.8 ft)	
