= Rafel Navarro =

Spanish football manager

Personal information
- Place of birth: Spain

Managerial career
- Years: Team
- 2009–2013: Gandesa (youth)
- 2014–2017: Gandesa
- 2017–2019: Reus B (assistant)
- 2019–2025: Barcelona (women assistant)
- 2025–: Switzerland (women)

Rafel Navarro is a Spanish football manager who manages the Switzerland women's national football team.

== Career ==
In 2014, Navarro was appointed manager of Spanish side Gandesa. Following his stint there, he was appointed as an assistant manager of Spanish side Reus B in 2017.

Ahead of the 2019–20 season, he was appointed as an assistant manager of Spanish side Barcelona. Subsequently, he was appointed manager of the Switzerland women's national football team.

== Personal life ==
Navarro was born on 6 January 1986 and is a native of Gandesa, Spain. Married, he has three children.
