= Noémie Beney =

Swiss association football player

Personal information
- Date of birth: 26 May 1985 (age 41)
- Height: 1.62 m (5 ft 4 in)
- Position: Defender

Senior career*
Years	Team	Apps	(Gls)
- Yverdon

International career
2007–2010	Switzerland	43	(1)
- * Club domestic league appearances and goals

Noémie Beney (born 26 April 1985) is a Swiss former footballer who was defender for Swiss club Yverdon and the Switzerland national team.

== International career ==
Noémie Beney represented Switzerland 43 times.
