= Frances Esemplare =

American actress

- Born: Frances Spalluto; September 3, 1934
- Died: December 9, 2017 (aged 83); Staten Island, New York, U.S.
- Other names: Frances Ensemplare
- Occupation: Actress
- Spouse: Gaetano Esemplare

Frances Esemplare (September 3, 1934 – December 9, 2017) was an American actress best known for her multi-episode recurring role as Maria Nuccia "Nucci" Gualtieri, mother of Paulie Gualtieri (played by Tony Sirico) on The Sopranos from 2001 until 2007.

== Early life ==
Born Frances Spalluto, Esemplare was a lifelong resident of Staten Island, New York.

== Career ==
Beginning in 2001, she was cast as Nucci Gualtieri, mother of mobster Paulie Gualtieri, on the HBO television series, The Sopranos. First introduced as Paulie Gualtieri's elderly mother, it is later revealed in the series that she is Gualtieri's biological aunt, who adopted him as a child. Frances Esemplare debuted in the May 2001 episode, "Army of One," and her character remained on the show until "Kennedy and Heidi" in May 2007. Esemplare appeared in eight episodes during her recurring role on the series, from season 3 to season 6.

== Filmography ==
=== Film ===
Year	Title	Role	Notes
1997	Sue Lost in Manhattan	Diner Patron	
2006	The Immaculate Misconception	Ma	

=== Television ===
Year	Title	Role	Notes
2001–2007	The Sopranos	Maria Nuccia "Nucci" Gualtieri	8 episodes

== Death ==
Frances Esemplare died on December 9, 2017, at the age 83. Esemplare was buried in Green-Wood Cemetery in Brooklyn, New York, on December 13, 2017.
