= Madelene Göras =

Swedish footballer and coach

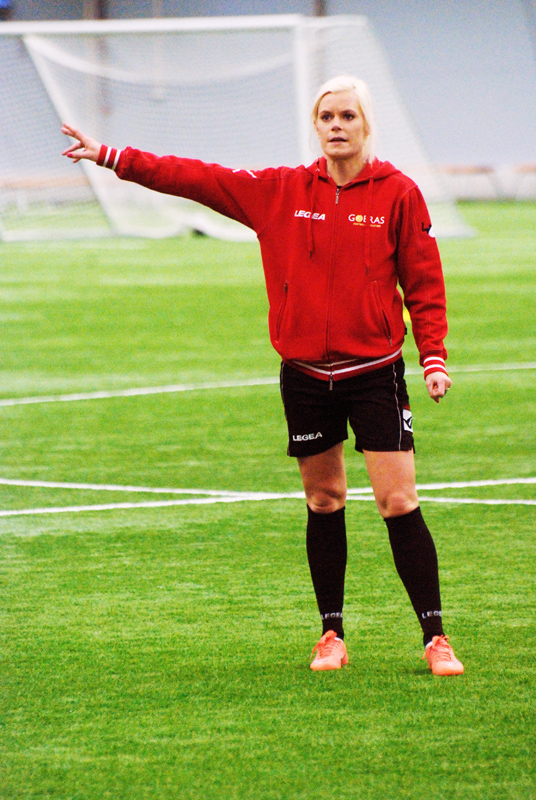
- Göras in November 2012

Personal information
- Full name: Madelene Marie Göras
- Date of birth: 20 January 1983 (age 43)
- Place of birth: Borlänge, Sweden
- Height: 1.67 m (5 ft 5 1/2 in)
- Position: Midfielder

Youth career
- 1989–1998: Forssa BK

Senior career*
| Years | Team | Apps | (Gls) |
| 1999–2000 | Ornäs | | |
| 2001–2003 | Umeå | | |
| 2003–2004 | Bälinge | | |
| 2005–2007 | AIK | | |
| 2008 | Djurgården | 8 | (0) |
- * Club domestic league appearances and goals

Madelene Marie "Madde" Göras (born 20 January 1983) is a Swedish football coach and former player. During her playing career she made 89 Damallsvenskan appearances for Ornäs BK, Umeå IK, Bälinge IF, AIK and Djurgårdens IF, scoring two goals. She was also a Swedish under-19 international.

In April 2002 while playing for Umeå, Göras suffered a knee injury which ruled her out for the rest of the season. Finding first team opportunities limited upon her return, she was allowed to join her local club Bälinge IF on loan in July 2003. She joined Bälinge on a permanent basis ahead of the 2004 season, reluctantly leaving Umeå whom she had joined aged 17 from Ornäs BK.

After a further season as a central midfielder with Bälinge, Göras transferred to AIK in November 2004. She signed a two-year contract with Djurgårdens in December 2007.

Göras made eight Damallsvenskan appearances for Djurgårdens in 2008 and required surgery on her hip. While recuperating, she was offered a full-time job with the Swedish Football Academy and decided to stop her playing career. In 2011, she founded Göras Football Education AB, her own football coaching company with its office in Nacka.

== Honours ==
Umeå

- Damallsvenskan (2): 2001, 2002
- Svenska Cupen (2): 2001, 2002
- UEFA Women's Cup (1): 2002–03
