= Laëtitia Stribick-Burckel =

French footballer (born 1984)

Personal information
- Date of birth: 22 January 1984 (age 42)
- Position: Goalkeeper

Senior career*
| Years | Team | Apps | (Gls) |
- Toulouse

International career
| | France | 1 | (0) |
- * Club domestic league appearances and goals

Laëtitia Stribick-Burckel is a former football player who played as goalkeeper for French club Toulouse of the Division 1 Féminine.

== International career ==
Stribick was selected as part of the French squad at the 2005 European Championships. Stribick earned only 1 cap for France.
