= Jeanne Haag =

French footballer (born 1983)

Personal information
- Date of birth: 26 October 1983 (age 43)
- Place of birth: Strasbourg, France
- Height: 1.63 m (5 ft 4 in)
- Position: Midfielder

Jeanne Haag (born 26 October 1983) is a French former professional footballer who played as a midfielder for SC Sand.
