= Hanne Sand Christensen =

Danish footballer (born 1973)

Hanne Sand
Personal information
- Full name: Hanne Sand Christensen
- Date of birth: 22 September 1973 (age 53)
- Place of birth: Denmark
- Position: Forward

International career^{‡}
Years	Team	Apps	(Gls)
1999	Denmark	2	(0)
- ‡ National team caps and goals as of 20 September 2003 (before the 1999 FIFA Women's World Cup)

Hanne Sand Christensen (born 22 September 1973) is a Danish footballer who played as a forward for the Denmark women's national football team. She was part of the team at the 1999 FIFA Women's World Cup.
