= Sofia Larsen =

Swedish politician (born 1972)

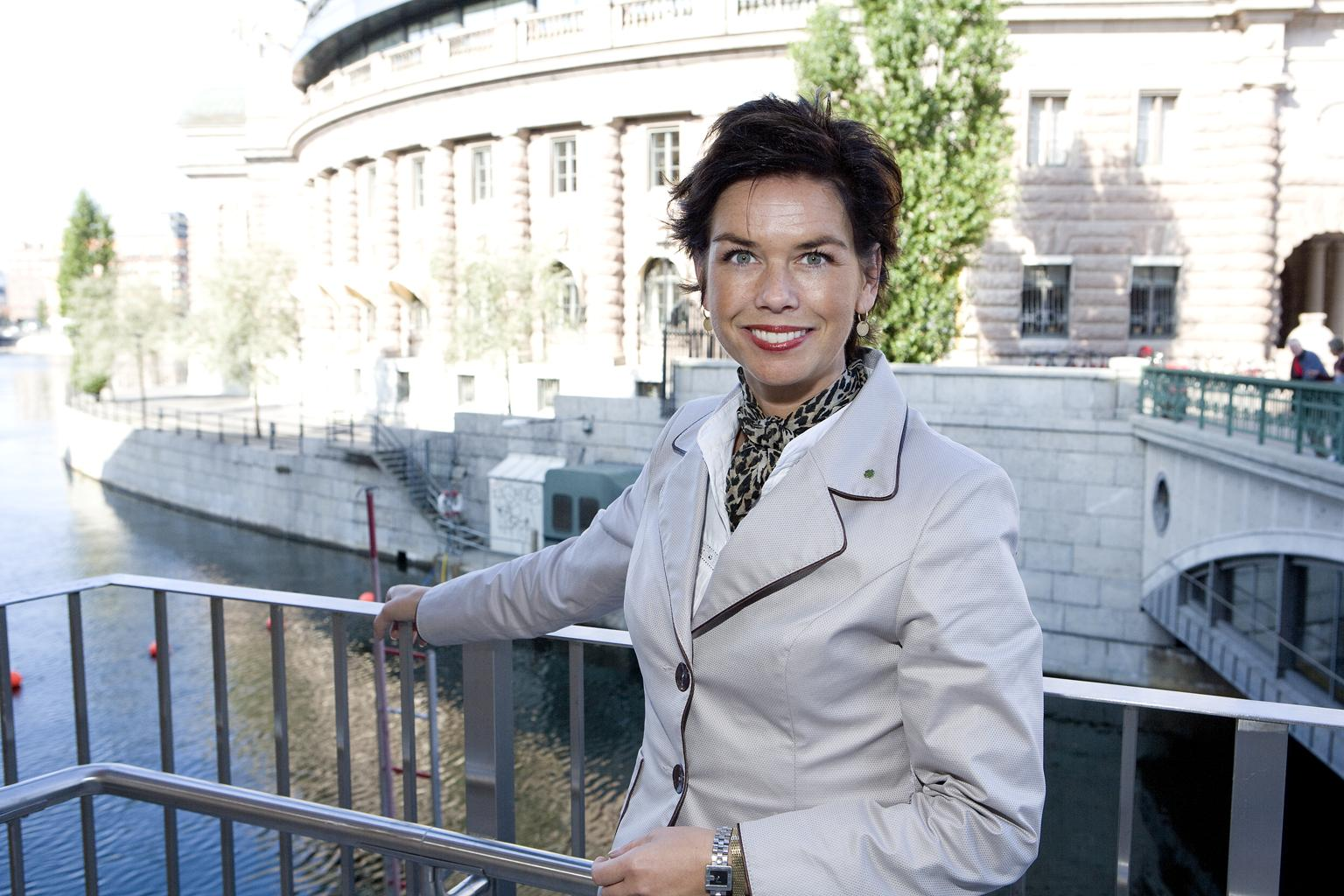
Sofia Larsen in 2008

Anna Sofia Larsen (née Jonsson; born 11 January 1972), is a Swedish Centre Party politician, member of the Riksdag since 1998.
