= Silje Vesterbekkmo =

Norwegian footballer (born 1983)

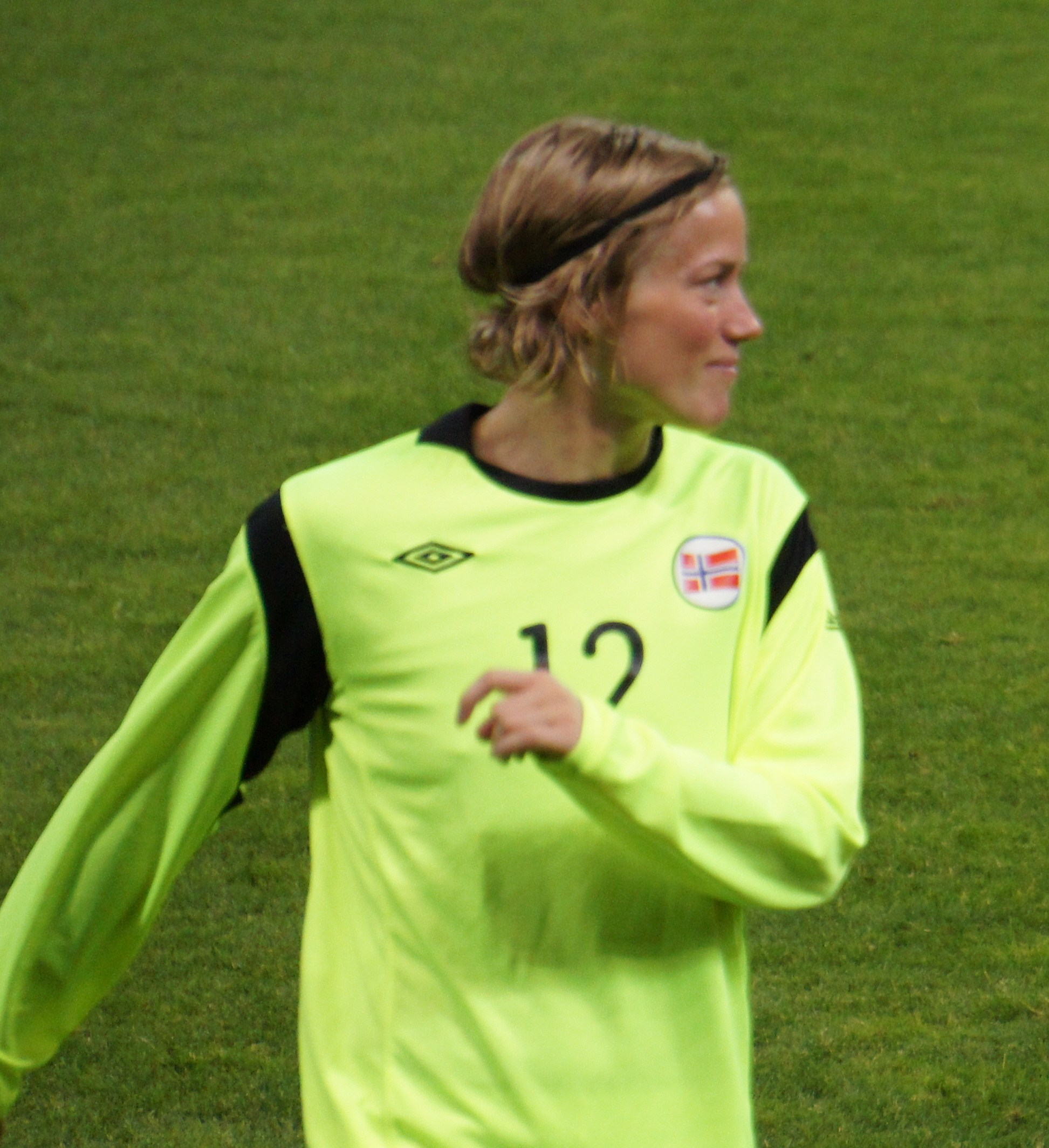

Personal information
- Full name: Silje Marie Vesterbekkmo
- Date of birth: 22 June 1983 (age 43)
- Place of birth: Mosjøen, Norway
- Height: 1.75 m (5 ft 9 in)
- Position: Goalkeeper

Senior career*
Years	Team	Apps	(Gls)
2000–2001	IK Grand Bodø		
2001–2002	Kolbotn		
2002–2007	Røa IL		
2007–2008	IK Grand Bodø		
2008–2010	IF Fløya	18	(0)
2012–2013	Medkila IL	4	(0)
2013–2016	Røa IL	71	(0)
2017	IK Grand Bodø	2	(0)

International career^{‡}
2000	Norway U-17	5	(0)
2001	Norway U-18	5	(0)
2002	Norway U-19	5	(1)
2013–2015	Norway	9	(0)
Medal record
Women's football
Representing Norway
UEFA Women's Championship
Silver medal – second place	2013 Sweden	Team
- * Club domestic league appearances and goals as of 23:42, 14 January 2022 (UTC) ‡ National team caps and goals as of 23:42, 14 January 2022 (UTC)

Silje Marie Vesterbekkmo (born 22 June 1983) is a Norwegian former footballer. She played as a goalkeeper for Røa IL and the Norway national team.

She played for IK Grand Bodø, Kolbotn, IF Fløya and Medkila IL before again joining Røa IL in 2013.

She was called up to be part of the national team for the UEFA Women's Euro 2013.
