= Maite Lizaso =

Spanish footballer (born 1983)

Personal information
- Full name: Maite Lizaso Campos
- Date of birth: 25 October 1983 (age 43)
- Place of birth: Zarautz, Spain
- Height: 1.68 m (5 ft 6 in)
- Position: Midfielder

Team information
- Current team: Athletic Bilbao
- Number: 5

Youth career
- Zarautz

Senior career*
Years	Team	Apps	(Gls)
1999–2004	Zarautz		
2004–2014	Real Sociedad	166+	(29+)
2014–2018	Athletic Club	70	(7)

International career
2006–2016	Basque Country	6	(0)
- * Club domestic league appearances and goals as of 20:45, 4 September 2016 (UTC)

Maite Lizaso Campos (born 25 October 1983) is a Spanish former football midfielder who played for Real Sociedad and Athletic Bilbao in the Primera División.

== Club career ==
Lizaso spent a decade with Real Sociedad, during which she suffered three serious knee injuries. She transferred to Basque derby rivals Athletic Bilbao in 2014.

== Honours ==
Athletic Bilbao

- Primera División: 2015–16
