= Janine Chamot =

Swiss footballer (born 1983)

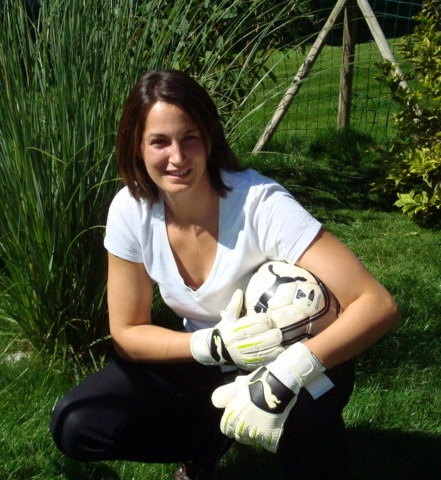

Personal information
- Full name: Janine Nicole Chamot
- Date of birth: February 4, 1983 (age 43)
- Place of birth: Morrens, Switzerland
- Position: Goalkeeper

Youth career
- 1993–1997: FC Köniz
- 1997–1998: FFC Bern

Senior career*
Years	Team	Apps	(Gls)
1998–1999	FFC Bern II		
2000–2009	FFC Bern		
2009–2011	Young Boys	51	(0)
2013–2014	Femina Kickers Worb		

International career^{‡}
1999–2002	Switzerland U19	about 40	(0)
2002–2008	Switzerland	4	(0)
- * Club domestic league appearances and goals as of 29 July 2023 ‡ National team caps and goals as of 31 December 2008, 24:00 (UTC)

Janine Chamot (born 4 February 1983) is a retired Swiss footballer who played as a goalkeeper for YB Frauen in the Swiss National League A (NLA). She was also a member of the Switzerland national team.

== Personal life ==
Born in Morrens, Switzerland, Janine is the daughter of Astrid and Jean-Paul Chamot (who was also goalkeeper for FC Köniz). She has one sister. She served her apprenticeship as sales clerk and now works as purchasing manager.

== Club career ==
Chamot started her youth football in 1993 by FC Köniz. In 1997 she moved to the youth and young ladies team of FFC Bern and played in their reserve team in the 1. Liga. Within just two years she had advanced into their first team in the NLA. With FFC Bern she won the national Double twice, in the 1999/2000 and 2000/01 seasons. Since 2009 the FFC Bern is integrated within the BSC Young Boys Betriebs AG, the holding of BSC Young Boys and since then the team plays in the NLA under the name YB Frauen. In 2010 Chamot won the women's title Goalkeeper of the year. The team won the Swiss Championship at the end of the 2010/2011 season.

== International career ==
Janine Chamot played in the regional U-16 selection team between 1996 and 1999. She played for the Swiss U-19 national team at youth level making her debut for the team during the first round of the qualification to the UEFA U-18 European Championship in the 5–0 home win against the Faroe Islands U-19 national team on 10 July 2000. Between 2002 and 2008 Chamot was in the Swiss National squad, she played four games, but was mainly reserve keeper behind first choice Marisa Brunner.

== Honours ==
- Swiss National Champion: with FFC Bern 2000, 2001, with YB Frauen 2011
- Swiss Women's Cup Winner: with FFC Bern 2000, 2001
- Swiss Women's Cup finalist: 2002, 2003, 2008, 2010, 2011
- Swiss Ladies Goalkeeper of the year: 2010
