= Anne-Mette Christensen =

Danish footballer (born 1973)

Personal information
- Date of birth: 4 March 1973 (age 53)
- Position: Defender

Senior career*
Years	Team	Apps	(Gls)
1993–	Fortuna Hjørring	316	

International career
1999	Denmark	3	(0)
- * Club domestic league appearances and goals

Anne-Mette Christensen (born 4 March 1973) is a Danish former international footballer who played as a defender for Fortuna Hjørring and the Denmark women's national football team. Christensen was part of the team at the 1999 FIFA Women's World Cup. Christensen is the current kit manager for Fortuna Hjørring.
