= Richard Holmlund =

Swedish football manager

Personal information
- Date of birth: 26 October 1963
- Date of death: 5 October 2011 (aged 47)

Managerial career
- Years: Team
- 1991–1998: Betsele IF
- 1999–2003: Umeå IK
- 2006: Umeå FC
- 2007–2009: KIF Örebro DFF
- 2009: Seychelles
- 2010: KIF Örebro DFF
- 2011: IK Sleipner

Richard Holmlund (26 October 1963 – 5 October 2011) was a Swedish football manager. In women's football, he managed Betsele IF from 1991–1998, Umeå IK from 1999–2003, and KIF Örebro DFF from 2007–2009 and again in 2010. In men's football, he managed Umeå FC in 2006, the Seychelles in 2009, and IK Sleipner in 2011.

He won the UEFA Women's Cup in 2003, the Swedish championship in 2000, 2001 and 2002, and the Swedish Cup in 2001 and 2002, at a time when Umeå IK were amongst the most dominant women's football teams in the world. He also won the Swedish Cup with KIF Örebro in 2010.

Holmlund was manager of men's side IK Sleipner at the time of his death in a car crash near Örebro in October 2011.
