= Mariann Gajhede Knudsen =

Danish footballer (born 1984)

Mariann Gajhede
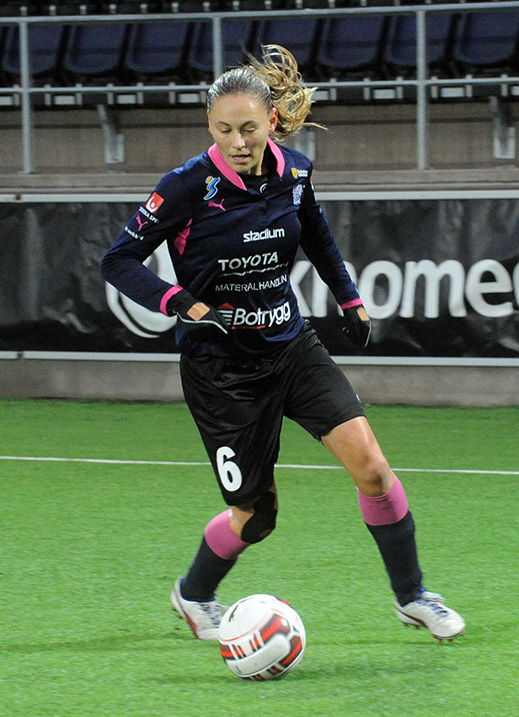

Personal information
- Date of birth: 16 November 1984 (age 41)
- Place of birth: Skagen, Denmark
- Height: 1.78 m (5 ft 10 in)
- Position: Midfielder

Team information
- Current team: Fortuna Hjørring

Youth career
- Skagen IK

Senior career*
Years	Team	Apps	(Gls)
–2001	B52/Aalborg		
2002–2010	Fortuna Hjørring		
2011–2016	Linköping FC	117	(10)

International career
2001	Denmark U17	8	(0)
2001–2003	Denmark U19	24	(2)
2003–2004	Denmark U21	10	(2)
2003–2015	Denmark	107	(6)
- * Club domestic league appearances and goals

Mariann Gajhede Knudsen (born 16 November 1984) is a Danish football coach and former player, who played as a central midfielder for the Danish national team. She was named Danish Player of the Year in 2008. Gajhede is the assistant coach at A-Liga club Fortuna Hjørring.

== Club career ==
Gajhede Knudsen represented Fortuna Hjørring in both legs of the 2003 UEFA Women's Cup Final, a 1–7 aggregate defeat by Umeå IK of Sweden. After being named 2008 Danish Player of the Year, she was nearly forced into retirement in 2009, when a blood clot on her leg kept her out for approximately twelve months.

In November 2010 Gajhede Knudsen brought eight years and 215 matches with Fortuna Hjørring to an end and signed for Linköpings. She was cup-tied for the remainder of LFC's 2010–11 UEFA Women's Champions League campaign. She won the 2016 Damallsvenskan league championship with Linköpings, then retired as the successful squad broke up at the end of the season.

== International career ==
Gajhede Knudsen made her senior international debut in October 2003, in a 6–1 win over Belgium. She went on to play at UEFA Women's Euro 2005 in North West England and the 2007 FIFA Women's World Cup in China. An anterior cruciate ligament injury kept Gajhede Knudsen out of UEFA Women's Euro 2009.

She was named in national coach Kenneth Heiner-Møller's Denmark squad for UEFA Women's Euro 2013. In Denmark's opening group match against hosts Sweden Gajhede Knudsen gave her team the lead in an eventful 1–1 draw.

In November 2014, exhaustion and niggling injuries caused Gajhede Knudsen to reluctantly withdraw temporarily from national team selection, allowing her to focus on club football. Gajhede retired from the national team in 2015, leading to a significant transition for the midfield in her absence.

== Managerial career ==
In 2017, Gajhede joined the Norwegian national team staff as a fitness coach and physiotherapist. In 2026 she joined A-Liga club Fortuna Hjørring as the assistant coach.
