= Graciela Olmos =

Mexican composer and businesswoman

- Born: Marina Aedo; December 10, 1895; Casas Grandes, Chihuahua, Mexico
- Died: May 31, 1962 (aged 66); Mexico City
- Other names: Graciela Olmos, "La Bandida"
- Occupations: Singer-songwriter, soldier, drug dealer, prostitute, pimp, and businesswoman

Marina Aedo (December 10, 1895 - May 31, 1962) was a singer-songwriter, soldier, alcohol trafficker, prostitute, pimp, and businesswomen, born in Casas Grandes, Mexico. While her birth name was Marina Aedo, she is better known by the name Graciela Olmos, or the nickname “La Bandida”.

== Early life ==
Graciela Olmos was born on December 10, 1895 in the Hacienda de San Diego in Casas Grandes, Chihuahua. In her youth, she was tasked with various duties such as cleaning the hacienda and caring for the animals. The hacienda was attacked during the Mexican Revolution, leaving 12-year-old Olmos and her younger brother Benjamín orphaned. They fled to Irapuato, Guanajuato, where she joined a convent and her brother entered a seminary.

== Involvement in the Mexican Revolution ==
During the Revolution, Pancho Villa’s troops arrived in Irapuato, where Marina met José Hernández, known as "El Bandido", and the two were married. Olmos the joined Pancho Villa’s army as a soldadera and served alongside Hernández until the Battle of Celaya, where he was killed, leaving her a widow at 20 years old. It was around this time that she was given the nickname "La Bandida", the feminine equivalent to her late husband's title, "El Bandido." During her time with the troops she learned guitar and began composing songs inspired by her experiences during the revolution.

== Trafficking Involvement ==
After the death of her husband, Olmos moved to Mexico City, where she took up gambling and became involved with various smuggling groups. Then moving to Ciudad Juarez and later El Paso Texas, where she began smuggling alcohol during the prohibition era in the USA.

== Brothel and life in business ==
Settling in Mexico City in the 1920s Graciela established a prostitution business called “Les Mexicanitas” which was frequented by politicians, artists and celebrities. Six years later, at the end of Lazaro Cardenas’s term, she opened “La Casa de La Bandida", a luxurious establishment in Colonia Condesa. It was a prominent meeting place for elites. However, it soon gained great notoriety when Graciela reentered into the prostitution industry. In addition to running her business she was dedicated to the education of “her girls” offering them classes in literature, gymnastics and swimming.

== Music and modern media ==
As a composer, Graciela Olmos made significant contributions to the Mexican music repertoire, especially in the corrido genre. Songs such as "Siete leguas" and " El corrido de Durango " narrate episodes of the Mexican Revolution and the lives of emblematic figures such as Pancho Villa.

== Death ==
She died in Mexico City on 31 May 1962 at the age of 66.

== Legacy ==
The life of Graciela Olmos has been the subject of various adaptations that highlight her influence on popular culture. The historical novel, La Bandida: The Most Powerful Harlot in the History of Mexico, by Magdalena González Gámez, offers a detailed look at her life and legacy. The telenovela La Bandida, starring Sandra Echeverría as Graciela Olmos, brought her story to a wider audience, highlighting her impact on Mexican society.
