= Julia Olmos =

Spanish footballer (born 1983)

Personal information
- Full name: Julia Olmos Peñuela
- Date of birth: 12 September 1983 (age 43)
- Place of birth: Valencia, Spain
- Position: Defender

Senior career*
Years	Team	Apps	(Gls)
1998–2003	Levante UD		
2003–2004	SS Lazio		
2007–2009	DSV Colegio Alemán		
- * Club domestic league appearances and goals

Julia Olmos Peñuela (born 12 September 1983) is a Spanish former football defender.

== Early and personal life ==
Born in Valencia, Olmos grew up practising many sports, including ballet and tennis. In July 2003, she was poised to enrol on the Erasmus Programme at the University of Nottingham but declined this as she accepted a contract at Italian club Lazio instead. As of 2019, she is a professor at the University of Valencia, working in the economics faculty.

== Club career ==
Olmos was a member of the first ever Levante women's squad. Throughout her career she played for Levante and Colegio Alemán in Spain's Superliga Femenina and Lazio in Italy's Serie A. Olmos was the second Spanish player to play for Lazio after Conchi Sánchez, who had three separate spells at the club. She retired in 2009 at 25.

== International career ==
She was an Under-19 international (2000–2001 and 2001–2002).
