= Switzerland women's national football team =

Women's national association football team

Switzerland
- Nickname(s): La Nati (National team); Rossocrociati (Red Crosses)
- Association: Swiss Football Association
- Confederation: UEFA (Europe)
- Head coach: Rafel Navarro
- Captain: Lia Wälti
- Most caps: Ana-Maria Crnogorčević (182)
- Top scorer: Ana-Maria Crnogorčević (75)
- FIFA code: SUI
| First colours | Second colours |

FIFA ranking
- Current: 26 (20 October 2026)
- Highest: 15 (June – August 2016)
- Lowest: 31 (March – June 2007)

First international
- Switzerland 2–2 France (Basel, Switzerland; 4 May 1972)

Biggest win
- Switzerland 15–0 Moldova (Lausanne, Switzerland; 6 September 2022)

Biggest defeat
- Germany 11–0 Switzerland (Weingarten, Germany; 25 September 1994)

World Cup
- Appearances: 2 (first in 2015)
- Best result: Round of 16 (2015, 2023)

European Championship
- Appearances: 3 (first in 2017)
- Best result: Quarter-finals (2025)

The Switzerland women's national football team represents Switzerland in international women's football.

Playing their first match in 1972, Switzerland did not enter their first major tournament until 2015, playing the World Cup, and then managed to qualify for Euro 2017, Euro 2022 and the 2023 World Cup in Australia and New Zealand.

== History ==
The two team captains, Sheila Parker (left) and Madeleine Boll (right), shaking hands before the Switzerland-England game in Basel in 1975

Switzerland qualified for the 2015 FIFA Women's World Cup in Canada by winning their qualifying group. It was the first time that Switzerland participated in a women's World Cup, and the first time both the men's team and women's team qualified for a World Cup simultaneously.

At the 2015 FIFA Women's World Cup, Switzerland was drawn into Group C with Japan, Cameroon and Ecuador. They secured a 10–1 victory over Ecuador, but lost 1–0 to Japan and 2–1 to Cameroon. Switzerland finished third in their group, but they were one of the top four third-place finishers and advanced to the knockout round. In the Round of 16, Switzerland lost 1–0 to the hosts, Team Canada and were eliminated.

Switzerland qualified for the European Championship for the first time in 2017. They were placed in Group C alongside France, Austria and Iceland. They lost to Austria 1–0, but then rebounded to beat Iceland 2–1. Switzerland went into their final group match against France needing a win in order to advance to the knockout stage. Switzerland led for much of the match after Ana-Maria Crnogorčević scored in the 19th minute, but Camille Abily scored the equalizer for France in the 76th minute while the Blues were playing at a numerical disadvantage, and the match ended in a 1–1 draw, as a result Switzerland finished third in their group and did not advance.

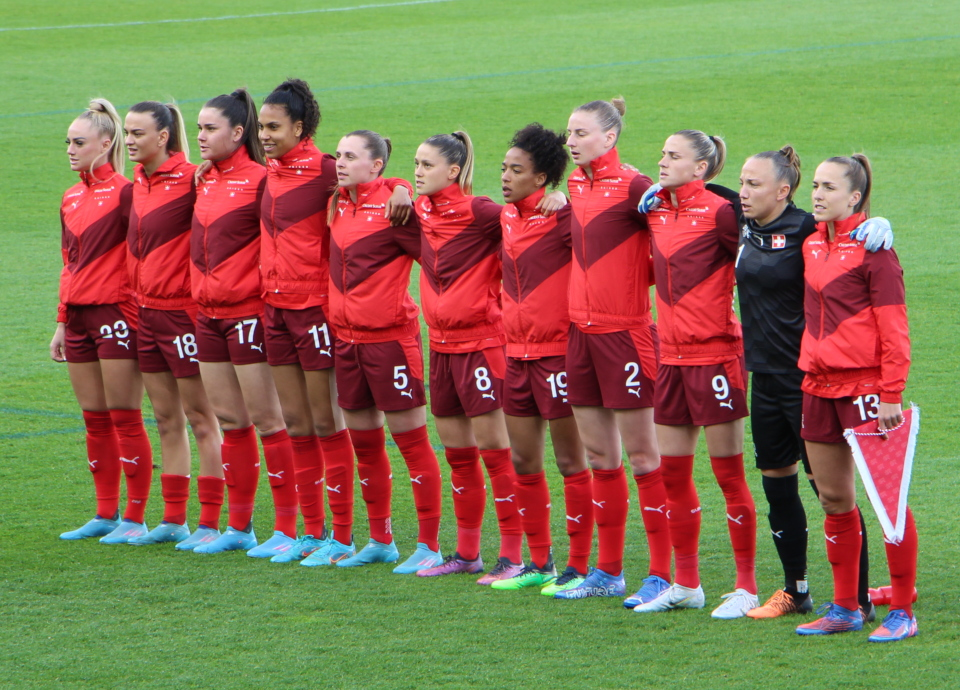
Switzerland women's national football team

At Euro 2022, Switzerland was again in Group C with Sweden, the Netherlands and Portugal as opponents. Switzerland left the competition in the first round, with a draw (2–2 against Portugal despite two goals scored in the first five minutes of the game) and two defeats against the favorites of the group (1–2 against Sweden and 1–4 against the Dutch title holders, having conceded the last three Dutch goals in the last 10 minutes of the game).

In the 2023 World Cup qualifiers, Switzerland ended their campaign by winning 15–0 against Moldova, setting a new record for goals in a match for the team. Switzerland then qualifies for the 2023 World Cup, 8 years after its only participation. It again manages to pass the 1st round and even finishes first in group A, thanks to an entry victory against the Philippines, novices in the competition (2–0), then two goalless draws in turn against Norway, then New Zealand, the host country of the event, resisting the offensive tendencies of the Scandinavians and the Oceanians. In the next round, the Nati will meet Spain, 2nd in Group C and eventual winners of the tournament, an opponent who has never made it past the round of 16 either. Switzerland are heavily beaten by La Roja (1–5) despite a fairly quick equalizer thanks to an unlikely own goal by Spanish defender Laia Codina and stops at the same stage as 8 years ago.

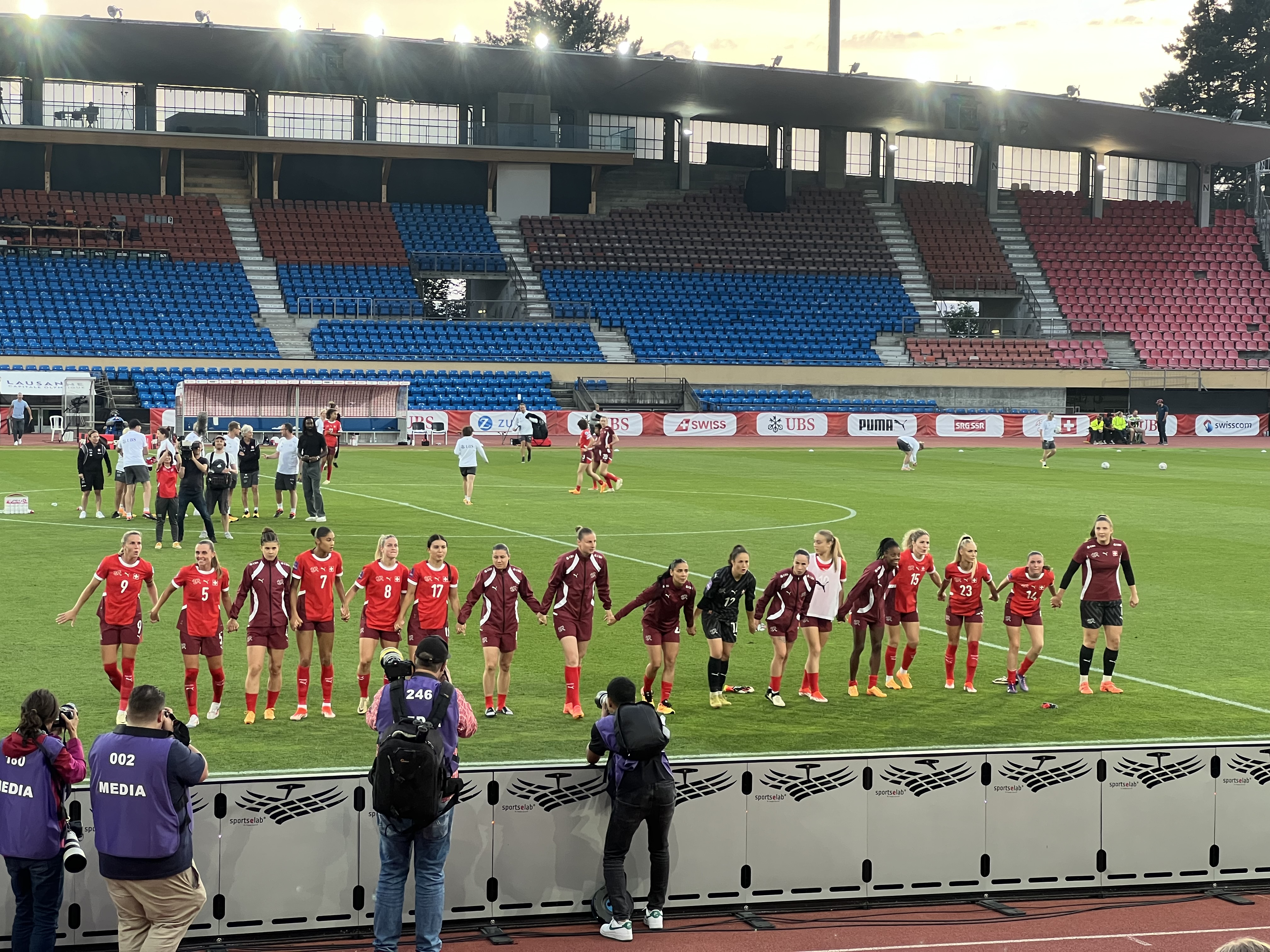
The Swiss team greeting their fans after dismissing Azerbaïdjan in Lausanne on their way to Euro 2025.

In 2025, Switzerland hosted the UEFA Women's Euro for the first time and have qualified automatically as host. After a loss in the opening game against Norway, they eventually managed to reached the Quarter finals, thanks to a 2–0 win against Iceland and a draw due to last-minute goal versus Finland. The tournament finally ended with a 0–2 defeat, once again the opponent was Spain.

Switzerland has never qualified for the Olympic games.

== Results and fixtures ==
The following is a list of match results in the last 12 months, as well as any future matches that have been scheduled.

Legend

Win Draw Loss Fixture

=== 2025 ===
| 28 November Friendly | Switzerland | 1–2 | Belgium | Jerez |
| 19:00 UTC+0 | Lehmann 64' | Report | Deloose 36'; Tine De Caigny 72' | Stadium: Estadio Municipal de Chapín |

| 2 December Friendly | Wales | 3–2 | Switzerland | Jerez |
| 12:00 UTC+0 | Ingle 15'; Cain 35'; Woodham 46' | Report | Csillag 18'; Beney 71' | Stadium: Estadio Municipal de Chapín |

=== 2026 ===
| 3 March 2027 FIFA Women's World Cup qualification | Switzerland | 2–0 | Northern Ireland | Lausanne |
| 19:00 | Xhemaili 22'; Fölmli 90+1' | Report | | Stadium: Stade de la Tuilière; Attendance: 4,165; Referee: Shona Shukrula (Netherlands) |

| 7 March 2027 FIFA Women's World Cup qualification | Malta | 1–4 | Switzerland | Ta' Qali |
| 19:00 | Farrugia 19' | Report | Beney 8'; Lehmann 10'; Fölmli 39'; Csillag 73' | Stadium: Centenary Stadium; Referee: Jelena Medjedović (Serbia) |

| 14 April 2027 FIFA Women's World Cup qualification | Switzerland | 3–1 | Turkey | Zurich |
| 19:00 | Csillag 49', 75'; Calligaris 80' | Report | Topçu 52' | Stadium: Letzigrund; Attendance: 12,355; Referee: Prychyna (Ukraine) |

| 18 April 2027 FIFA Women's World Cup qualification | Turkey | 1–1 | Switzerland | Sinop |
| 18:00 | Selen Altunkulak 79' | Report | Crnogorčević 52' | Stadium: Sinop City Stadium; Attendance: 5,981; Referee: Katalin Kulcsár (Hungary) |

| 5 June 2027 FIFA Women's World Cup qualification | Switzerland | 6–1 | Malta | Lugano |
| 19:30 | Schertenleib 8'; Piubel 23'; Xhemaili 38', 81'; Csillag 40'; Reuteler 70' | Report (FIFA); Report (UEFA) | Willis 21' | Stadium: AIL Arena; Attendance: 7,526; Referee: Kristina Georgieva (Bulgaria) |

| 9 June 2027 FIFA Women's World Cup qualification | Northern Ireland | 1–2 | Switzerland | Lurgan |
| 19:30 | Cassap 85' | Report (FIFA); Report (UEFA) | Reuteler 29'; Vallotto 41' | Stadium: Mourneview Park; Referee: Anastasia Mylopoulou (Greece) |

| 9 October 2027 FIFA Women's World Cup qualification play-offs | Israel | 3–7 | Switzerland | Mezőkövesdi Városi Stadion, Mezőkövesd (Hungary) (Note: Due to the Middle Eastern crisis, Israel are required to play their home matches at neutral venues.) |
| 15:30 | Sommer 20', 35', 53' | Report (FIFA); Report (UEFA) | Reuteler 14'; Beney 45+1'; Schertenleib 47'; Xhemaili 65', 72'; Kamber 90+1', 90+3' | Attendance: 28; Referee: Sofiya Prychyna (Ukraine) |

| 13 October 2027 FIFA Women's World Cup qualification play-offs | Switzerland | 2–0 | Israel | Sion |
| 19:30 | Report (FIFA); Report (UEFA) | Report (FIFA); Report (UEFA) | | Stadium: Stade de Tourbillon; Referee: Kirsty Dowle (England) |

| November 2027 FIFA Women's World Cup qualification play-offs | Switzerland | v | Austria |

| December 2027 FIFA Women's World Cup qualification play-offs | Austria | v | Switzerland |

== Coaching staff ==
=== Current coaching staff ===
The senior women's management team includes:

| Role | Name |
|---|---|
| Head coach | (Spain) Rafel Navarro |
| Goalkeeping coaches | (Germany) Nadine Angerer |
| Goalkeeping coaches | (Switzerland) Patricia Gsell |

=== Manager history ===
- (Switzerland) Jost Leuzinger (2000–2004)
- (Switzerland) Béatrice von Siebenthal (2005–2012)
- (Germany) Martina Voss-Tecklenburg (2012–2018)
- (Denmark) Nils Nielsen (2018–2022)
- (Germany) Inka Grings (2022–2023)
- (Switzerland) Reto Gertschen (2023) (caretaker)
- (Sweden) Pia Sundhage (2024–2025)
- (Spain) Rafel Navarro (2025–)

== Players ==
=== Current squad ===
The following players were called up for the 2027 FIFA Women's World Cup qualification matches against Israelon on 9 and 13 October 2026, respectively.

Caps and goals correct as of 9 June 2026, after the match against Northern Ireland.

| No. | Pos. | Player | Date of birth (age) | Caps | Goals | Club |
|---|---|---|---|---|---|---|
| 1 | GK | Elvira Herzog | 5 March 2000 (age 26) | 23 | 0 | (German Football Association) RB Leipzig |
| 12 | GK | Livia Peng | 14 March 2002 (age 24) | 22 | 0 | (The Football Association) Chelsea |
| 21 | GK | Lourdes Romero | 2 December 2002 (age 23) | 0 | 0 | (German Football Association) 1. FC Nürnberg |
| 2 | DF | Julia Stierli | 3 April 1997 (age 29) | 57 | 1 | (German Football Association) SC Freiburg |
| 4 | DF | Noemi Ivelj | 1 November 2006 (age 20) | 18 | 1 | (German Football Association) Eintracht Frankfurt |
| 5 | DF | Noelle Maritz | 23 December 1995 (age 30) | 142 | 2 | (The Football Association) Aston Villa |
| 8 | DF | Nadine Riesen | 11 April 2000 (age 26) | 44 | 2 | (The Football Association) West Ham United |
| 9 | DF | Ana-Maria Crnogorčević | 3 October 1990 (age 36) | 182 | 75 | (French Football Federation) Strasbourg |
| 18 | DF | Viola Calligaris | 17 March 1996 (age 30) | 80 | 9 | (Royal Spanish Football Federation) Atlético Madrid |
| 6 | MF | Géraldine Reuteler | 21 April 1999 (age 27) | 91 | 18 | (The Football Association) Arsenal |
| 7 | MF | Riola Xhemaili | 5 March 2003 (age 23) | 43 | 10 | (Italian Football Federation) Como 1907 |
| 10 | MF | Sydney Schertenleib | 30 January 2007 (age 19) | 26 | 5 | (Royal Spanish Football Federation) Barcelona |
| 11 | MF | Coumba Sow | 27 August 1994 (age 32) | 60 | 13 | (Swiss Football Association) Basel |
| 17 | FW | Seraina Piubel | 2 June 2000 (age 26) | 28 | 4 | (The Football Association) West Ham United |
| 13 | MF | Lia Wälti (captain) | 19 April 1993 (age 33) | 140 | 5 | (The Football Association) Brighton & Hove Albion |
| 14 | MF | Smilla Vallotto | 23 March 2004 (age 22) | 32 | 5 | (German Football Association) VfL Wolfsburg |
| 22 | MF | Lia Kamber | 30 January 2006 (age 20) | 9 | 0 | (German Football Association) Union Berlin |
| | MF | Alena Bienz | 5 March 2003 (age 23) | 6 | 0 | (German Football Association) SC Freiburg |
| 19 | FW | Iman Beney | 23 July 2006 (age 20) | 23 | 3 | (The Football Association) Manchester City |
| 23 | FW | Alisha Lehmann | 21 January 1999 (age 27) | 66 | 10 | (The Football Association) Leicester City |
| 17 | FW | Svenja Fölmli | 19 August 2002 (age 24) | 33 | 7 | (German Football Association) TSG Hoffenheim |
| 15 | FW | Leila Wandeler | 11 April 2006 (age 20) | 12 | 0 | (The Football Association) West Ham United |
| 23 | FW | Lydia Andrade | 20 February 1999 (age 27) | 6 | 0 | (German Football Association) 1. FC Köln |

=== Recent call-ups ===
The following players have also been called up to the squad within the past 12 months.

| Pos. | Player | Date of birth (age) | Caps | Goals | Club | Latest call-up |
|---|---|---|---|---|---|---|
| GK | Nadine Böhi | 21 November 2003 (age 22) | 0 | 0 | (Germany) Union Berlin | v. Turkey, 18 April 2026 |
| GK | Irina Fuchs ^{INJ} | 18 September 2005 (age 21) | 0 | 0 | (Germany) 1. FC Köln | v. Turkey, 14 April 2026 |
| DF | Eseosa Aigbogun | 23 May 1993 (age 33) | 100 | 3 | (Italy) Como 1907 | v. Wales, 2 December 2025 |
| DF | Laia Ballesté | 22 February 1999 (age 27) | 2 | 0 | (Switzerland) Servette | v. Malta, 7 March 2026 |
| DF | Amina Muratović | 4 May 2006 (age 20) | 1 | 0 | (Switzerland) Servette | v. Malta, 5 June 2026 |
| DF | Ella Touon | 7 August 2003 (age 23) | 3 | 0 | (Germany) SGS Essen | v. Malta, 5 June 2026 |
| FW | Leela Egli | 11 December 2006 (age 19) | 4 | 0 | (Germany) Union Berlin | v. Turkey, 18 April 2026 |
| FW | Alayah Pilgrim | 29 April 2003 (age 23) | 19 | 5 | (Italy) Roma | v. Malta, 5 June 2026 |
| FW | Aurélie Csillag ^{INJ} | 24 January 2003 (age 23) | 17 | 5 | (England) Liverpool | v. Malta, 5 June 2026 |
| MF | Meriame Terchoun | 27 October 1995 (age 31) | 46 | 3 | (Switzerland) Servette | v. Malta, 7 March 2026 |
Notes: ^{INJ} = Withdrew due to injury; ^{PRE} = Preliminary squad; ^{RET} = Retired from national team

== Records ==
As of 9 June 2026

Players in bold are still active with the national team.

=== Most appearances ===
| Rank | Player | Career | Caps | Goals |
|---|---|---|---|---|
| 1 | **Ana-Maria Crnogorčević** | 2009–present | 182 | 75 |
| 2 | **Ramona Bachmann** | 2007–present | 153 | 60 |
| 3 | **Noelle Maritz** | 2013–present | 142 | 2 |
| 4 | **Lia Wälti** | 2011–present | 140 | 5 |
| 5 | Lara Dickenmann | 2002–2018 | 135 | 53 |
| 6 | Martina Moser | 2005–2017 | 129 | 20 |
| 7 | Caroline Abbé | 2006–2017 | 127 | 10 |
| 8 | Gaëlle Thalmann | 2007–2023 | 109 | 0 |
| 9 | **Eseosa Aigbogun** | 2013–present | 100 | 3 |
| 10 | **Géraldine Reuteler** | 2017–present | 91 | 17 |
| 10 | Vanessa Bernauer | 2006–2022 | 91 | 7 |

=== Top goalscorers ===
| # | Player | Career | Goals | Caps | Avg. |
|---|---|---|---|---|---|
| 1 | **Ana-Maria Crnogorčević** | 2009–present | 75 | 182 | 0.41 |
| 2 | **Ramona Bachmann** | 2007–present | 60 | 153 | 0.39 |
| 3 | Lara Dickenmann | 2002–2018 | 53 | 135 | 0.39 |
| 4 | Fabienne Humm | 2012–2023 | 25 | 80 | 0.31 |
| 5 | Martina Moser | 2005–2017 | 20 | 129 | 0.16 |
| 6 | **Géraldine Reuteler** | 2017–present | 17 | 91 | 0.19 |
| 7 | Rahel Kiwic | 2012–2022 | 14 | 83 | 0.17 |
| 8 | Sonja Stettler Spinner | 1984–1998 | 13 | 51 | 0.25 |
| 8 | **Coumba Sow** | 2018–present | 13 | 58 | 0.22 |
| 10 | Sandy Maendly | 2006–2022 | 12 | 89 | 0.13 |

== Competitive record ==
=== FIFA Women's World Cup ===
| FIFA Women's World Cup record | | | | | | | | | | Qualification record | | | | | | |
| Year | Result | Pos. | Pld | W | D* | L | GF | GA | GD | Pld | W | D* | L | GF | GA | GD |
| (China) 1991 | did not qualify | | | | | | | | | UEFA Euro 1991 | | | | | | |
| (Sweden) 1995 | did not qualify | | | | | | | | | UEFA Euro 1995 | | | | | | |
| (United States) 1999 | did not qualify | | | | | | | | | 8 | 2 | 0 | 6 | 7 | 12 | −5 |
| (United States) 2003 | did not qualify | | | | | | | | | 6 | 1 | 0 | 5 | 2 | 18 | −16 |
| (China) 2007 | did not qualify | | | | | | | | | 8 | 1 | 1 | 6 | 3 | 18 | −15 |
| (Germany) 2011 | did not qualify | | | | | | | | | 14 | 8 | 1 | 5 | 35 | 17 | +18 |
| (Canada) 2015 | Round of 16 | 15th | 4 | 1 | 0 | 3 | 11 | 5 | +6 | 10 | 9 | 1 | 0 | 53 | 1 | +52 |
| (France) 2019 | did not qualify | | | | | | | | | 12 | 6 | 4 | 2 | 25 | 12 | +13 |
| (Australia) (New Zealand) 2023 | Round of 16 | 14th | 4 | 1 | 2 | 1 | 3 | 5 | −2 | 11 | 9 | 1 | 1 | 46 | 5 | +41 |
| (Brazil) 2027 | to be determined | | | | | | | | | to be determined | | | | | | |
| (Costa Rica) (Jamaica) (Mexico) (United States) 2031 | to be determined | | | | | | | | | to be determined | | | | | | |
| (United Kingdom) 2035 | to be determined | | | | | | | | | to be determined | | | | | | |
| Total | 2/9 | 15th | 8 | 2 | 2 | 4 | 14 | 10 | +4 | 69 | 36 | 8 | 25 | 171 | 83 | +88 |

*Draws include knockout matches decided on penalty kicks.

==== Match History ====
FIFA Women's World Cup history
| Year | Round | Date | Opponent | Result | Stadium |
|---|---|---|---|---|---|
| (Canada) 2015 | Group stage | 8 June | Japan | L 0–1 | BC Place, Vancouver |
| (Canada) 2015 | Group stage | 12 June | Ecuador | W 10–1 | BC Place, Vancouver |
| (Canada) 2015 | Group stage | 16 June | Cameroon | L 1–2 | Commonwealth Stadium, Edmonton |
| (Canada) 2015 | Round of 16 | 21 June | Canada | L 0–1 | BC Place, Vancouver |
| (Australia) / (New Zealand) 2023 | Group stage | 21 July | Philippines | W 2–0 | Forsyth Barr Stadium, Dunedin |
| (Australia) / (New Zealand) 2023 | Group stage | 25 July | Norway | D 0–0 | Waikato Stadium, Hamilton |
| (Australia) / (New Zealand) 2023 | Group stage | 30 July | New Zealand | D 0–0 | Forsyth Barr Stadium, Dunedin |
| (Australia) / (New Zealand) 2023 | Round of 16 | 5 August | Spain | L 1–5 | Eden Park, Auckland |

=== UEFA Women's Championship ===
| UEFA Women's Championship record | | | | | | | | Qualifying record | | | | | | | |
| Year | Result | GP | W | D* | L | GF | GA | GP | W | D* | L | GF | GA | P/R | Rnk |
| (England) (Italy) (Norway) (Sweden) 1984 | Did not qualify | | | | | | | 6 | 1 | 3 | 2 | 4 | 6 | – | |
| (Norway) 1987 | Did not qualify | | | | | | | 6 | 1 | 1 | 4 | 5 | 11 | – | |
| (West Germany) 1989 | Did not qualify | | | | | | | 6 | 1 | 1 | 4 | 4 | 28 | – | |
| (Denmark) 1991 | Did not qualify | | | | | | | 6 | 1 | 1 | 4 | 3 | 17 | – | |
| (Italy) 1993 | Did not qualify | | | | | | | 4 | 0 | 1 | 3 | 0 | 17 | – | |
| (England) (Germany) (Norway) (Sweden) 1995 | Did not qualify | | | | | | | 6 | 2 | 1 | 3 | 9 | 23 | – | |
| (Norway) (Sweden) 1997 | Did not qualify | | | | | | | 8 | 5 | 1 | 2 | 21 | 10 | – | |
| (Germany) 2001 | Did not qualify | | | | | | | 8 | 1 | 2 | 5 | 2 | 12 | – | |
| (England) 2005 | Did not qualify | | | | | | | 8 | 1 | 2 | 5 | 2 | 13 | – | |
| (Finland) 2009 | Did not qualify | | | | | | | 8 | 3 | 2 | 3 | 9 | 16 | – | |
| (Sweden) 2013 | Did not qualify | | | | | | | 10 | 5 | 0 | 5 | 29 | 24 | – | |
| (Netherlands) 2017 | Group Stage | 3 | 1 | 1 | 1 | 3 | 3 | 8 | 8 | 0 | 0 | 34 | 3 | – | |
| (England) 2022 | Group Stage | 3 | 0 | 1 | 2 | 4 | 8 | 10 | 6 | 3 | 1 | 22 | 8 | – | |
| (Switzerland) 2025 | Quarter final | 4 | 1 | 1 | 2 | 4 | 5 | 6 (Note: Switzerland qualified automatically as hosts. However they still participated in the qualifying competition, which from Euro 2025 onwards is linked to the Women's Nations League where teams are divided into leagues with promotion/relegation between the leagues at the end of each cycle.) | 5 | 0 | 1 | 14 | 3 | ▲ | 19th |
| (Germany) 2029 | | | | | | | | | | | | | | | |
| Total | 3/14 | 10 | 2 | 3 | 5 | 11 | 16 | 100 | 40 | 18 | 42 | 158 | 191 | 19th | |

*Draws include knockout matches decided on penalty kicks.

=== World Cup / Euro Qualifying match history ===
| Competition | Stage | Result | Opponent | Position / Notes |
|---|---|---|---|---|
| 1984 EC QS | GS: Gr.3 | 2–0, 1–1 | Portugal | 3 / 4 |
| 1984 EC QS | GS: Gr.3 | 1–1, 0–0 | France | 3 / 4 |
| 1984 EC QS | GS: Gr.3 | 0–2, 0–2 | Italy | 3 / 4 |
| (Norway) 1987 EC QS | GS: Gr.4 | 2–0, 0–3 | Spain | 4 / 4 |
| (Norway) 1987 EC QS | GS: Gr.4 | 0–3, 1–2 | Italy | 4 / 4 |
| (Norway) 1987 EC QS | GS: Gr.4 | 1–2, 1–1 | Hungary | 4 / 4 |
| (West Germany) 1989 EC QS | GS: Gr.3 | 1–7, 3–0 | Hungary | 4 / 4 |
| (West Germany) 1989 EC QS | GS: Gr.3 | 0–0, 0–10 | West Germany | 4 / 4 |
| (West Germany) 1989 EC QS | GS: Gr.3 | 0–5, 0–6 | Italy | 4 / 4 |
| (Denmark) 1991 EC QS | GS: Gr.5 | 0–4, 0–4 | Denmark | 3 / 4 |
| (Denmark) 1991 EC QS | GS: Gr.5 | 0–0, 2–1 | Spain | 3 / 4 |
| (Denmark) 1991 EC QS | GS: Gr.5 | 1–4, 0–4 | Italy | 3 / 4 |
| (Italy) 1993 EC QS | GS: Gr.1 | 0–10, 0–6 | Norway | 3 / 3 |
| (Italy) 1993 EC QS | GS: Gr.1 | 0–0, 0–1 | Belgium | 3 / 3 |
| (Germany) 1995 EC QS | GS: Gr.5 | 3–2, 4–2 | Wales | 3 / 4 |
| (Germany) 1995 EC QS | GS: Gr.5 | 0–5, 0–11 | Germany | 3 / 4 |
| (Germany) 1995 EC QS | GS: Gr.5 | 1–2, 1–1 | Croatia | 3 / 4 |
| (Norway) / (Sweden) 1997 EC QS | GS: Class B, Gr.3 | 5–0, 1–1 | FR Yugoslavia | 1 / 4 |
| (Norway) / (Sweden) 1997 EC QS | GS: Class B, Gr.3 | 3–0, 3–4 | Austria | 1 / 4 |
| (Norway) / (Sweden) 1997 EC QS | GS: Class B, Gr.3 | 0–2, 3–1 | Greece | 1 / 4 |
| (Norway) / (Sweden) 1997 EC QS | Promotion play-off | 3–2 3–0 | Croatia | Promoted to Class A |
| (United States) 1999 WC QS | GS: Class A, Gr.2 | 0–1 0–1 | Finland | 4 / 4 |
| (United States) 1999 WC QS | GS: Class A, Gr.2 | 1–2, 0–3 | France | 4 / 4 |
| (United States) 1999 WC QS | GS: Class A, Gr.2 | 1–3, 0–2 | Italy | 4 / 4 |
| (United States) 1999 WC QS | Relegation play-off | 1–0, 4–0 | Poland | Remain in Class A |
| (Germany) 2001 EC QS | GS: Class A, Gr.2 | 0–4 0–1 | Norway | 4 / 4 |
| (Germany) 2001 EC QS | GS: Class A, Gr.2 | 0–3, 0–1 | England | 4 / 4 |
| (Germany) 2001 EC QS | GS: Class A, Gr.2 | 1–0, 0–2 | Portugal | 4 / 4 |
| (Germany) 2001 EC QS | Relegation play-off | 1–1, 0–0 | Belgium | Remain in Class A |
| (United States) 2003 WC QS | GS: Class A, Gr.2 | 1–0 0–1 | Finland | 3 / 4 |
| (United States) 2003 WC QS | GS: Class A, Gr.2 | 0–4, 1–4 | Denmark | 3 / 4 |
| (United States) 2003 WC QS | GS: Class A, Gr.2 | 0–5, 0–4 | Sweden | 3 / 4 |
| (England) 2005 EC QS | GS: Class A, Gr.1 | 0–6, 0–2 | Sweden | 4 / 5 |
| (England) 2005 EC QS | GS: Class A, Gr.1 | 1–0, 0–1 | Serbia and Montenegro | 4 / 5 |
| (England) 2005 EC QS | GS: Class A, Gr.1 | 1–1, 0–2 | Finland | 4 / 5 |
| (England) 2005 EC QS | GS: Class A, Gr.1 | 0–1, 0–0 | Italy | 4 / 5 |
| (China) 2007 WC QS | GS: Class A, Gr.4 | 0–2, 0–2 | Russia | 5 / 5 |
| (China) 2007 WC QS | GS: Class A, Gr.4 | 0–4, 0–6 | Germany | 5 / 5 |
| (China) 2007 WC QS | GS: Class A, Gr.4 | 2–0, 0–2 | Republic of Ireland | 5 / 5 |
| (China) 2007 WC QS | GS: Class A, Gr.4 | 0–1, 1–1 | Scotland | 5 / 5 |
| (Finland) 2009 EC QS | GS: Gr.4 | 1–0, 1–3 | Belgium | 3 / 5 |
| (Finland) 2009 EC QS | GS: Gr.4 | 2–2, 1–1 | Netherlands | 3 / 5 |
| (Finland) 2009 EC QS | GS: Gr.4 | 0–7, 0–3 | Germany | 3 / 5 |
| (Finland) 2009 EC QS | GS: Gr.4 | 2–0, 2–0 | Wales | 3 / 5 |
| (Germany) 2011 WC QS | GS: Gr.6 | 2–0, 2–1 | Republic of Ireland | 1 / 5 |
| (Germany) 2011 WC QS | GS: Gr.6 | 1–2, 3–0 | Russia | 1 / 5 |
| (Germany) 2011 WC QS | GS: Gr.6 | 2–1, 6–0 | Israel | 1 / 5 |
| (Germany) 2011 WC QS | GS: Gr.6 | 4–2, 8–0 | Kazakhstan | 1 / 5 |
| (Germany) 2011 WC QS | Play-offs | 0–2, 2–3 | England | |
| (Germany) 2011 WC QS | Repechage: SF | 3–1, 0–0 | Denmark | |
| (Germany) 2011 WC QS | Repechage: F | 0–1, 2–4 | Italy | |
| (Sweden) 2013 EC QS | GS: Gr.2 | 1–4, 0–6 | Germany | 3 / 6 |
| (Sweden) 2013 EC QS | GS: Gr.2 | 4–1, 2–4 | Romania | 3 / 6 |
| (Sweden) 2013 EC QS | GS: Gr.2 | 2–3, 4–3 | Spain | 3 / 6 |
| (Sweden) 2013 EC QS | GS: Gr.2 | 8–1, 0–1 | Kazakhstan | 3 / 6 |
| (Sweden) 2013 EC QS | GS: Gr.2 | 5–0, 3–1 | Turkey | 3 / 6 |

=== UEFA Women's Nations League ===
UEFA Women's Nations League record
| League phase | | | | | | | | | | | | Finals | | | | | | | |
| Season | Lg | Grp | Pos | Pld | W | D | L | GF | GA | P/R | Rnk | Year | Pos | Pld | W | D | L | GF | GA |
|---|---|---|---|---|---|---|---|---|---|---|---|---|---|---|---|---|---|---|---|
| 2023–24 | A | 4 | 4th | 6 | 1 | 0 | 5 | 2 | 17 | ▼ | 14th | (Europe) 2024 | Did not qualify | | | | | | |
| 2025 | A | 2 | 4th | 6 | 0 | 2 | 4 | 4 | 12 | ▼ | 15th | (Europe) 2025 | Did not qualify | | | | | | |
| Total | | | | 12 | 1 | 2 | 9 | 6 | 29 | | | Total | | | | | | | |

| ▲ | Promoted at end of season |
| Same position | No movement at end of season |
| ▼ | Relegated at end of season |
| * | Participated in promotion/relegation play-offs |

== See also ==
- Sport in Switzerland
  - Football in Switzerland
    - Women's football in Switzerland
- Switzerland women's national under-17 football team
- Switzerland women's national beach soccer team
