= Susanne Graversen =

Danish football goalkeeper (born 1984)

Personal information
- Date of birth: 8 November 1984 (age 41)
- Place of birth: Denmark
- Position: Goalkeeper

Team information
- Current team: IK Skovbakken
- Number: 1

Senior career*
Years	Team	Apps	(Gls)
–2004	Fortuna Hjørring		
2005–	IK Skovbakken		

International career^{‡}
2002	Denmark U-19		
2006	Denmark	1	(0)
- * Club domestic league appearances and goals ‡ National team caps and goals as of 18 December 2007

Susanne Graversen (born 8 November 1984) is a Danish former goalkeeper.
