= Béatrice von Siebenthal =

Swiss football manager (born 1964)

Personal information
- Date of birth: 6 July 1964 (age 62)
- Place of birth: Bern, Switzerland

Managerial career
- Years: Team
- 2004–2011: Switzerland (women

Béatrice von Siebenthal (born 6 July 1964) is a Swiss football manager who was the coach of the Switzerland women's national team for seven years from 2004 to 2011. She resigned from being the head coach of the Switzerland women's national team in 2011.
