= Checca, Peru =

Town in Cusco Region, Peru

Coordinates: 14.4757°S 71.4035°W

Checca is a town in the Cusco Region of Peru (the geographical coordinates of the city: 14° 28' 22" South, 71° 23' 38" West). Its population is 3,810. The city maintains average temperatures of at least 4.1 to 8.1 degrees Celsius throughout the year, with an average precipitation of 837.8 millimeters.
