= Best Female Football Player of the Year Award (Europe) =

The following is a list of female footballers who received the Best Female Football Player of the Year Award.

== Albania ==
Association: Federata Shqiptare e Futbollit (FSHF)

Founded in 2009, the National Championship is the highest division of women's football in Albania. Currently there are 11 teams competing in this domestic competition. The Albanian Women's National Team was formed in 2011 and made its debut in a friendly match against F.Y.R. Macedonia. The match was won by Albania 1-0.

No awards are currently given in women's football.

== Andorra ==
Association: Federació Andorrana de Futbol (FAF)

Currently there is no domestic competition in Andorra. The Andorran National Team took part in the preliminary round of the qualifications for the 2019 FIFA Women's World Cup to be held in France.

No awards are currently given in women's football.

== Armenia ==
Association: Հայաստանի Ֆուտբոլի Ֆեդերացիա (FFA)

After the split from the Soviet Union, Armenia played its first international match in May 2003 in and against Austria, losing 11-0. Today only a U19 team is active at international level, and it is ranked at 139th place by FIFA. Currently Armenia has a domestic competition of nine teams competing in two national divisions (Women Football championship Group A and Group B).

No awards are currently given in women's football.

== Austria ==
Association: Österreichischer Fußball-Bund (ÖFB)

Award: Fußballerin des Jahres

The Austrian National Team started playing in July 1970. Their first match was against Mexico, and they lost 9-0. Austria made its international competitive debut in the 1970 Women's World Cup - an unofficial competition held in Italy.

Founded in 1973, the ÖFB-Frauenliga is the top level competition in Austrian women's domestic football.

Austria was among the first countries in Europe to launch a "Player of the Year" award for women's football. The trophy is awarded to the best (Austrian) player active in the ÖFB-Frauenliga. The first award was won by Renate Seidl (ESV Ostbahn XI Wien) in 1983.

Year	First place	Club	Current Club
1983	Renate Seidl (AUT)	(Austria) ESV Ostbahn XI Wien	(Austria) retired
1984	Renate Wimmer (AUT)	(Austria) Union Kleinmünchen Linz	(Austria) retired
1985	Manuela kastner (AUT)	(Austria) Union Kleinmünchen Linz	(Austria) retired
1986	Petra Singer (AUT)	(Austria) Wiener Berufsschulen CA	(Austria) retired
1987	Renate Vukits (AUT)	(Austria) DFC LUV Graz	(Austria) retired
1988	Herta Pahr (AUT)	(Austria) ESV Parndorf	(Austria) retired
1989	Herta Pahr (AUT)	(Austria) ESV Parndorf	(Austria) retired
1990	Herta Pahr (AUT)	(Austria) ESV Parndorf	(Austria) retired
1991	Ilse Fazekas (AUT)	(Austria) SC Neunkirchen	(Austria) retired
1992	Yvonne Widermann (AUT)	(Austria) SC Neunkirchen	(Austria) retired
1993	Sabine Koglbauer (AUT)	(Austria) SC Neunkirchen	(Austria) retired
1994	Alexandra Salinger (AUT)	(Austria) SC Neunkirchen	(Austria) retired
1995	Birgit Stickler (AUT)	(Austria) SC Neunkirchen	(Austria) retired
1996	Natascha Jud (AUT)	(Austria) ASV Vösendorf	(Austria) retired
1997	Elisabeth Hajszan (AUT)	(Austria) ASV Vösendorf	(Austria) retired
1998	Melanie Hammerschmid (AUT)	(Austria) USC Landhaus Wien	(Austria) retired
1999	Eveline Gabler (AUT)	(Austria) SV Horn	(Austria) retired
2000	Christina Windisch (AUT)	(Austria) SC Damen Dörfl	(Austria) unknown
2001	Christina Windisch (AUT)	(Austria) SC Damen Dörfl	(Austria) unknown
2002	Kathrin Entner (AUT)	(Austria) USC Landhaus Wien	(Austria) SV Neulengbach
2003	Cornelia Wallisch (AUT)	(Austria) SV Groß-Schweinbarth	(Austria) unknown
2004	Sabine Brand (AUT)	(Austria) SV Neulengbach	(Austria) SV Neulengbach
2005	Pamela Wolfram (AUT)	(Austria) SV Groß-Schweinbarth	(Austria) unknown
2006	Daniela Auer (AUT)	(Austria) SV Groß-Schweinbarth	(Austria) unknown
2007	Christina Peintinger (AUT)	(Austria) LUV Graz	(Austria) unknown
2008	unknown		
2009	unknown		
2010	unknown		
2011	Katrin Sida (AUT)	(Austria) SKV Altenmarkt	(Austria) unknown
2012	unknown		
2013	Lisa-Marie Zmek (AUT)	(Austria) FC Südburgenland	(Austria) SV Neulengbach
2014	Lisa-Marie Zmek (AUT)	(Austria) FC Südburgenland	(Austria) SV Neulengbach
2015	Lisa-Marie Zmek (AUT)	(Austria) FC Südburgenland	(Austria) SV Neulengbach

== Azerbaijan ==
Association: Azərbaycan Futbol Federasiyaları Assosiasiyası (AFFA)

Azerbaijan does not have a domestic football competition for women. There is an Azerbaijani National Team, although it is an U-21 team according to the official website of the AFFA.

No awards are currently given in women's football.

== Belarus ==
Association: Беларуская Федэрацыя Футбола (BFF)

The Premier League is the top level domestic competition in Belarus played with 7 teams. Belarus first time appearance at international level was in the 1997 UEFA Women's Euro Qualification stage. In their first official international match they lost 1-0 to the Czech Republic.

No awards are currently given in women's football.

== Belgium ==
Association: Koninklijke Belgische Voetbalbond (KBVB) / Union royale belge des sociétés de football association (URBSFA) / Königlicher Belgischer Fußballverband (KBFV)

Award: Gouden Schoen / Soulier d'Or

Belgium made its international debut against France in May 1976, winning 2-1. Today the Super League Vrouwenvoetbal is the highest division in Belgian women's football with 7 teams. Belgium also has a 1e Klasse / Division I - 2e Klasse A / Division II A - 2e Klasse B / Division II B each played with 14 teams of which some are secondary teams of clubs playing in the Super League. Earlier forms of domestic competition were the BeNe League, which was a joint competition with The Netherlands from 2012 - 2015. Before the BeNe League the competition in Belgium was classified as "Lagere Klassen" or lower class or amateur football.

In 2017 the first official Gouden Schoen / Soulier d'Or was awarded for the Best Belgian Female Player of the year playing either domestically or abroad. In 2015 the Sparkle award was introduced in protest at the Belgian Football Association not having an award equivalent to men's.

Year	First place	Club	Current Club
2014^{1}	Tessa Wullaert (BEL)	(Belgium) Standard Liège	(Germany) VfL Wolfsburg
2015^{1}	Lineth Beerensteyn (NED)	(Netherlands) ADO Den Haag	(Netherlands) ADO Den Haag
2015^{2}	Tessa Wullaert (BEL)	(Belgium) Standard Liège	(Germany) VfL Wolfsburg
2016^{2}	Aline Zeler (BEL)	(Belgium) Standard Liège	(Belgium) Standard Liège
2016^{3}	Tessa Wullaert (BEL)	(Germany) VfL Wolfsburg	(Germany) VfL Wolfsburg

^{1} BeNe League Bottega Player of the year (joined award Belgium & Netherlands)

^{2} The Sparkle is an award for the best female soccer player comparable to the Belgian Golden Shoe for men, awarded by the BFC (Belgian Football coaches), Super League Vrouwenvoetbal and the city of Ostend

^{3} Belgian Golden Shoe

== Bosnia and Herzegovina ==
Association: Nogometni/Fudbalski Savez Bosne i Hercegovine (N/FSBiH) / Ногоʍєmɴн/Фудбалски Савез Босне и Херцеговине (Н/ФСБиХ)

Award: Idol Nacije

The Premier League (Ženska Premijer Liga BiH) is the highest division in Bosnian women's football and is played with 8 teams. Founded in its current form in 2013, it is one of the most recent women's leagues in Europe. Being a part of the former Yugoslav countries, Bosnia & Herzegovina made its first independent international appearance in September 1997 in and against Slovakia. A game they lost 11-0.

Bosnia & Herzegovina is - at this time - about the only former Yugoslavian country to award the best female football player. Lidija Kuliš (SFK 2000 Sarajevo) was the first to receive this award in 2008.

Year	First place	Club	Current Club
2008	Lidija Kuliš (BIH)	(Bosnia and Herzegovina) SFK 2000	(Sweden) Linköpings FC
2009	Aida Hadžić (BIH)	(Bosnia and Herzegovina) SFK 2000	(Bosnia and Herzegovina) SFK 2000
2010	Alisa Spahić (BIH)	(Bosnia and Herzegovina) SFK 2000	(Bosnia and Herzegovina) SFK 2000
2011	not awarded		
2012	Amira Spahić (BIH)	(Bosnia and Herzegovina) SFK 2000	(Bosnia and Herzegovina) SFK 2000
2013	Amira Spahić (BIH)	(Bosnia and Herzegovina) SFK 2000	(Bosnia and Herzegovina) SFK 2000
2014	not awarded		
2015	Armisa Kuč (MNE)	(Bosnia and Herzegovina) SFK 2000	(Bosnia and Herzegovina) SFK 2000
2016	Armisa Kuč (MNE)	(Bosnia and Herzegovina) SFK 2000	(Bosnia and Herzegovina) SFK 2000

== Bulgaria ==
Association: Български футболен съюз (БФС) / Bŭlgarski futbolen sŭyuz (BFU)

Award: Футболист №1 на България / Futbolist №1 na Balgariya

The Bulgarian national championship of women's football (Държавно първенство жени) is the top level league in Bulgaria. Founded in 1985, it is played with 8 teams. Bulgaria made its debut at international level in October 1987 where they drew (1-1) against Spain.

In 2015 Bulgaria launched an award for the best female football player of the year. The first winner was Silvia Radoyska who, at that time, played on loan for Spanish club Sporting de Huelva.

Year	First place	Club	Current Club
2015	Silvia Radoyska (BUL)	(Spain) Sporting de Huelva	(Bulgaria) FC NSA Sofia
2016	Evdokiya Popadinova (BUL)	(England) London Bees	(England) London Bees

== Croatia ==
Association: Hrvatski nogometni savez (HNS)

Founded in 1992, the 1. HNLŽ (Prva hrvatska nogometna liga za žene) is the top level of women's football in Croatia and is played with 10 teams. Since its independence from Yugoslavia in 1991, Croatia made its debut in a friendly against Slovenia. They lost the match 3-2.

No awards are currently given in women's football.

== Cyprus ==
Association: Cyprus Football Association (CFA) / Κυπριακή Ομοσπονδία Ποδοσφαίρου (ΚΟΠ)

The Cypriot First Division is the top division of women's football in Cyprus. It has been running since its establishment during the 1998-1999 season and has since played with 9 teams. Cyprus played its first international match in April 2002 when they received Greece for a neighbour friendly. The match was won by the Greece 2-4.

No awards are currently given in women's football.

== Czech Republic ==
Association: Fotbalová asociace České republiky (FAČR)

Award: Fotbalistka roku

The I. liga žen is the top level women's football league of the Czech Republic and is played with 8 teams. After the split of Czechoslovakia in 1993, the Czech National Team played its first international friendly against former compatriot Slovakia, beating them 6-0.

The award for best player of the year was introduced in 2002. First to win was Kateřina Došková of AC Sparta Praha.

Year	First place	Club	Current Club
2002	Kateřina Došková (CZE)	(Czech Republic) AC Sparta Praha	(Czech Republic) FK Krupka
2003	Eva Šmeralová (CZE)	(Czech Republic) AC Sparta Praha	(Czech Republic) retired
2004	Pavlína Ščasná (CZE)	(Germany) FC Bayern München	(Czech Republic) retired
2005	Zuzana Pincová (CZE)	(Czech Republic) AC Sparta Praha	(Czech Republic) retired
2006	Pavlína Ščasná (CZE)	(Sweden) KIF Örebro	(Czech Republic) retired
2007	Pavlína Ščasná (CZE)	(Sweden) KIF Örebro	(Czech Republic) retired
2008	Pavlína Ščasná (CZE)	(Sweden) LdB Malmö	(Czech Republic) retired
2009	Petra Divišová (CZE)	(Czech Republic) SK Slavia Praha	(Czech Republic) SK Slavia Praha
2010	Petra Divišová (CZE)	(Czech Republic) SK Slavia Praha	(Czech Republic) SK Slavia Praha
2011	Veronika Pincová (CZE)	(Czech Republic) SK Slavia Praha	(Czech Republic) SK Slavia Praha
2012	Lucie Martínková (CZE)	(Czech Republic) AC Sparta Praha	(Czech Republic) AC Sparta Praha
2013	Lucie Martínková (CZE)	(Sweden) KIF Örebro	(Czech Republic) AC Sparta Praha
2014	Lucie Martínková (CZE)	(Sweden) KIF Örebro	(Czech Republic) AC Sparta Praha
2015	Kateřina Svitková (CZE)	(Czech Republic) SK Slavia Praha	(Czech Republic) SK Slavia Praha

== Denmark ==
Association: Dansk Boldspil-Union (DBU)

Award: Player of the Year

A-Liga is the top division of the Danish Women's Football League, founded in 1972 and today contested by 10 teams. Denmark made its international debut against Sweden in July 1974, a match they won 1-0.

In 2000 the first Player of the year award for women was introduced. Gitte Krogh (Odense Boldklub) was the first to win this award.

Year	Recipient	Club	Current Club
2000	Gitte Krogh (DEN)	(Denmark) OB	Retired
2001	Christine Bonde (DEN)	(Denmark) Fortuna Hjørring	Retired
2002	Heidi Johansen (DEN)	(Denmark) OB	Retired
2003	Anne Dot Eggers Nielsen (DEN)	(Denmark) Skovbakken	Retired
2004	Cathrine Paaske-Sørensen (DEN)	(Denmark) Brøndby	Retired
2005	Merete Pedersen (DEN)	(Italy) Torres	Retired
2006	Cathrine Paaske-Sørensen (DEN)	(Denmark) Brøndby	Retired
2007	Katrine Pedersen (DEN)	(Norway) Asker	Retired
2008	Mariann Gajhede Knudsen (DEN)	(Denmark) Fortuna Hjørring	Retired
2009	Mia Brogaard (DEN)	(Denmark) Brøndby	Retired
2010	Line Røddik Hansen (DEN)	(Sweden) Tyresö	Retired
2011	Sanne Troelsgaard (DEN)	(Denmark) Skovbakken	(Denmark) Midtjylland
2012	Theresa Nielsen (DEN)	(Denmark) Brøndby	Retired
2013	Katrine Pedersen (DEN)	(Norway) Stabæk	Retired
2014	Simone Boye (DEN)	(Denmark) Brøndby	(Denmark) HB Køge
2015	Pernille Harder (DEN)	(Sweden) Linköpings FC	(Germany) Bayern Munich
2016	Pernille Harder (DEN)	(Sweden) Linköpings FC	(Germany) Bayern Munich
2017	Pernille Harder (DEN)	(Germany) VfL Wolfsburg	(Germany) Bayern Munich
2018	Pernille Harder (DEN)	(Germany) VfL Wolfsburg	(Germany) Bayern Munich
2019	Pernille Harder (DEN)	(Germany) VfL Wolfsburg	(Germany) Bayern Munich
2020	Pernille Harder (DEN)	(Germany) VfL Wolfsburg / (England) Chelsea	(Germany) Bayern Munich
2021	Signe Bruun (DEN)	(France) Lyon	(Spain) Real Madrid
2022	Stine Ballisager (DEN)	(Norway) Vålerenga	(Germany) Bayern Munich
2023	Amalie Vangsgaard (DEN)	(France) PSG	(England) Aston Villa
2024	Pernille Harder (DEN)	(Germany) Bayern Munich	(Germany) Bayern Munich
2025	Pernille Harder (DEN)	(Germany) Bayern Munich	(Germany) Bayern Munich

== England ==
Association: English Football Association (FA)

Award: PFA Women's Players' Player of the Year

Women's football in England is played on 10 different levels of which the Women's Super League 1 & Women's Super League 2, played with 10 teams each, are the highest levels. England made its debut on the international scene in November 1972. They concluded their first match in and against Scotland with a 2-3 win.

The PFA Women's Players' Player of the Year award was introduced in 2013 and is only 1 of 3 official awards to be won in English women's football. The first player to win this award was Scottish International Kim Little (Arsenal L.F.C.). Other awards in English women's football: FA WSL 1 Players' Player of the Year award, Vauxhall England Women's Player of the Year award

Year	First place	Club	Current Club
2011^{1}	Rachel Williams (ENG)	(England) Birmingham City L.F.C.	(England) Notts County L.F.C.
2012^{1}	Jess Fishlock (WAL)	(England) Bristol City W.F.C.	(Australia) Melbourne City FC
2012^{2}	Stephanie Houghton (ENG)	(England) Arsenal L.F.C.	(England) Manchester City W.F.C.
2013^{1}	Natasha Dowie (ENG)	(England) Liverpool L.F.C.	(Australia) Melbourne Victory FC
2013^{3}	Kim Little (SCO)	(England) Arsenal L.F.C.	(England) Arsenal L.F.C.
2014^{1}	Ji So-yun (KOR)	(England) Chelsea L.F.C.	(England) Chelsea L.F.C.
2014^{2}	Toni Duggan (ENG)	(England) Manchester City W.F.C.	(England) Manchester City W.F.C.
2014^{3}	Lucy Bronze (ENG)	(England) Liverpool L.F.C.	(England) Manchester City W.F.C.
2015^{1}	Beth Mead (ENG)	(England) Sunderland A.F.C.	(England) Sunderland A.F.C.
2015^{3}	Ji So-yun (KOR)	(England) Chelsea L.F.C.	(England) Chelsea L.F.C.
2016^{1}	Lucy Bronze (ENG)	(England) Manchester City W.F.C.	(England) Manchester City W.F.C.
2016^{2}	Jordan Nobbs (ENG)	(England) Arsenal L.F.C.	(England) Arsenal L.F.C.
2016^{3}	Izzy Christiansen (ENG)	(England) Manchester City W.F.C.	(England) Manchester City W.F.C.

^{1} FA WSL 1 Players' Player of the Year award

^{2} Vauxhall England Women's Player of the Year award

^{3} PFA Women's Players' Player of the Year award

== Estonia ==
Association: Eesti Jalgpalli Liit (EJL)

Award: Estonian Female Footballer of the Year

Naiste Meistriliiga is the highest division in women's domestic football in Estonia. Founded in 1994 this league is played with 8 teams. Estonia made its debut in and against Lithuania in June 1994. They lost 3-0.

An award for the best Estonian Footballer of the Year has been issued since 1994 and was first awarded to Aire Lepik (Viljandi JK Tulevik). From 2009 the best player in the Naiste Meistriliiga is honoured. First to win this award was Russian national Svetlana Khvatova (FC Levadia Tallinn).

Year	First place	Club	Current Club
1994	Aire Lepik (EST)	(Estonia) Viljandi JK Tulevik	(Estonia) retired
1995	Aire Lepik (EST)	(Estonia) Viljandi JK Tulevik	(Estonia) retired
1996	Maaren Olander (EST)	(Sweden) Östervåla IF	(Estonia) retired
1997	Anastassia Morkovkina (EST)	(Estonia) TKSK Arsenal	(Estonia) Pärnu JK
1998	Maaren Olander (EST)	(Estonia) FC Flora Tallinn	(Estonia) retired
1999	Annika Tammela (EST)	(Estonia) Pärnu JK	(Estonia) retired
2000	Anastassia Morkovkina (EST)	(Estonia) Pärnu JK	(Estonia) Pärnu JK
2001	Maria Filatova (EST)	(Estonia) TKSK Visa	(Estonia) unknown
2002	Anastassia Morkovkina (EST)	(Estonia) Pärnu JK	(Estonia) Pärnu JK
2003	Anastassia Morkovkina (EST)	(Estonia) Pärnu JK	(Estonia) Pärnu JK
2004	Anastassia Morkovkina (EST)	(Estonia) Pärnu JK	(Estonia) Pärnu JK
2005	Anastassia Morkovkina (EST)	(Estonia) Pärnu JK	(Estonia) Pärnu JK
2006	Ave Pajo (EST)	(Estonia) JK Tallinna Kalev	(Estonia) JK Tallinna Kalev
2007	Reelika Vaher (EST)	(Estonia) FC Levadia Tallinn	(Estonia) FC Levadia Tallinn
2008	Kaidi Jekimova (EST)	(Estonia) FC Levadia Tallinn	(Estonia) FC Levadia Tallinn
2009	Anastassia Morkovkina (EST)	(Estonia) Pärnu JK	(Estonia) Pärnu JK
2009^{1}	Svetlana Khvatova (RUS)	(Estonia) FC Levadia Tallinn	(Estonia) FC Levadia Tallinn
2010	Anastassia Morkovkina (EST)	(Estonia) Pärnu JK	(Estonia) Pärnu JK
2010^{1}	Signy Aarna (EST)	(Estonia) FC Lootos Põlva	(Finland) Pallokissat
2011	Signy Aarna (EST)	(Estonia) FC Lootos Põlva	(Finland) Pallokissat
2011^{1}	Margarita Žernoserkova (EST)	(Estonia) FC Levadia Tallinn	(Estonia) Pärnu JK
2012	Pille Raadik (EST)	(Finland) Åland United	(Finland) Åland United
2012^{1}	Anastassia Morkovkina (EST)	(Estonia) Pärnu JK	(Estonia) Pärnu JK
2013	Getter Laar (EST)	(Estonia) FC Flora Tallinn	(France) FC Metz-Algrange
2013^{1}	Elis Meetua (EST)	(Estonia) Pärnu JK	(Estonia) Pärnu JK
2014	Kethy Õunpuu (EST)	(Estonia) FC Flora Tallinn	(Estonia) FC Flora Tallinn
2014^{1}	Kairi Himanen (EST)	(Estonia) Pärnu JK	(Estonia) Pärnu JK
2015	Signy Aarna (EST)	(Finland) Pallokissat	(Finland) Pallokissat
2015^{1}	Anastassia Morkovkina (EST)	(Estonia) Pärnu JK	(Estonia) Pärnu JK
2016	Inna Zlidnis (EST)	(Hungary) Ferencvárosi TC	(Hungary) Ferencvárosi TC
2016^{1}	Anastassia Morkovkina (EST)	(Estonia) Pärnu JK	(Estonia) Pärnu JK

^{1} Naiste Meistriliiga Player of the Season

== Europe (UEFA) ==
Association: Union of European Football Associations (UEFA)

Award: UEFA Best Women's Player in Europe Award

Year	First place	Club	Current Club
2013	Nadine Angerer (GER)	(Germany) 1. FFC Frankfurt	(United States) goalkeeping coach Portland Thorns FC
2014	Nadine Keßler (GER)	(Germany) VfL Wolfsburg	(Germany) retired
2015	Célia Šašić (GER)	(Germany) 1. FFC Frankfurt	(Germany) retired
2016	Ada Hegerberg (NOR)	(France) Olympique Lyonnais	(France) Olympique Lyonnais

== F.Y.R. Macedonia ==
Association: Фудбалска Федерација на Македонија (ФФМ) / Fudbalska Federacija na Makedonija (FFM)

Award: Macedonian Footballer of the Year

The 1. лига - Жени (1st women's league) is the top-level women's league in Macedonia. Active since 2001, it is played with 9 teams. Macedonia made its official debut at international level in May 2005. In their first game they lost 4-0 to Croatia.

Little information is currently available relating to the Player of the Year award for women, and it is believed that the award was not formalised until 2013. First to have won the prize was Sirieta Brahimi in 2004.

Year	First place	Club	Current Club
2004	Sirieta Brahimi (MKD)	(North Macedonia) unknown	(North Macedonia) unknown
2005	no info available		
2006	Milka Arsova (MKD)	(North Macedonia) unknown	(North Macedonia) unknown
2007	no info available		
2008	no info available		
2009	no info available		
2010	no info available		
2011	Gentjana Rochi (MKD)	(North Macedonia) ŽFK Naše Taksi	(Germany) BV Cloppenburg
2012	no info available		
2013	Nataša Andonova (MKD)	(Germany) 1. FFC Turbine Potsdam	(Sweden) FC Rosengård
2014	Nataša Andonova (MKD)	(Germany) 1. FFC Turbine Potsdam	(Sweden) FC Rosengård
2015	Nataša Andonova (MKD)	(Sweden) FC Rosengård	(Sweden) FC Rosengård
2016	Teodora Dimovska (MKD)	(North Macedonia) ŽFK Dragon 2014	(North Macedonia) ŽFK Dragon 2014

== Faroe Islands ==
Association: Fótbóltssamband Føroya (FSF)

1. deild kvinnur (1st division women) is the top level women's football league of the Faroe Islands and is played with 6 teams. In September 1995 the Faroe Islands women's national football team made its first official appearance in a friendly against Ireland which they lost 0-2. Nine years earlier, in June 1986, the Faroe Islands had an unofficial match with Iceland. Iceland won 6-0.

No awards for best player are currently given in women's football although there is an award for top scorer of the year which was established in 1989.

== Finland ==
Association: Suomen Palloliitto (SPL) / Finlands Bollförbund (FBF)

Award: Jalkapalloilija vuoden

The Naisten Liiga / Damligan is the premier division in Finnish women's football. Under its new form (established in 2006) the competition is played with 11 teams. In their debut match in August 1973 Finland drew with Sweden.

In Finland the first Female player of the year award was introduced in 1976. Merja Sjöman (Turun Palloseura) was the first winner.

Year	First place	Club	Current Club
1976	Merja Sjöman (FIN)	(Finland) Turun Palloseura	(Finland) retired
1977	Soile Malm (FIN)	(Finland) Kemin Into	(Finland) retired
1978	Åsa Wennström (FIN)	(Finland) IF Finströms Kamraterna	(Finland) retired
1979	Kirsi Koskela (FIN)	(Finland) Helsingin Jalkapalloklubi	(Finland) retired
1980	Merja Sjöman (FIN)	(Finland) Turun Palloseura	(Finland) retired
1981	Tarja Konttila (FIN)	(Finland) unknown	(Finland) unknown
1982	Anna-Maria Lehtonen (FIN)	(Finland) HJK Helsinki	(Finland) retired
1983	Hanna-Mari Sarlin (FIN)	(Finland) HJK Helsinki	(Finland) retired
1984	Tuula Sundman (FIN)	(Finland) HJK Helsinki	(Finland) retired
1985	Marianne Sulén (FIN)	(Finland) HJK Helsinki	(Finland) retired
1986	Hanna-Mari Sarlin (FIN)	(Finland) HJK Helsinki	(Finland) retired
1987	Anu Toikka (FIN)	(Finland) HJK Helsinki	(Finland) retired
1988	Tiina Lehtola (FIN)	(Sweden) AIK Fotboll	(Finland) retired
1989	Soile Ojala (FIN)	(Finland) Helsinki United	(Finland) retired
1990	Marja Aaltonen (FIN)	(Norway) Asker SK	(Finland) retired
1991	Susanna Kuosmanen (FIN)	(Finland) Herttoniemen Toverit	(Finland) retired
1992	Pauliina Auveri (FIN)	(Finland) Malmin Palloseura	(Finland) retired
1993	Anne Mäkinen (FIN)	(Finland) FC Kontu	(Finland) retired
1994	Johanna Lindell (FIN)	(Sweden) Hammarby IF	(Finland) retired
1995	Marianne Lindholm (FIN)	(Finland) FC Kontu	(Finland) retired
1996	Hanna Ekström (FIN)	(Finland) HJK Helsinki	(Finland) retired
1997	Kaisa Mustonen (FIN)	(Finland) Tampereen Ilves	(Finland) retired
1998	Hanna Ekström (FIN)	(Finland) HJK Helsinki	(Finland) retired
1999	Laura Kalmari (FIN)	(Finland) HJK Helsinki	(Finland) retired
2000	Sani Ylitalo (FIN)	(Finland) HJK Helsinki	(Finland) retired
2001	Sanna Valkonen (FIN)	(Finland) HJK Helsinki	(Finland) retired
2002	Sanna Valkonen (FIN)	(United States) Boston Renegades	(Finland) retired
2003	Laura Kalmari (FIN)	(Sweden) Umeå IK	(Finland) retired
2004	Anne Mäkinen (FIN)	(United States) New Jersey Wildcats	(Finland) retired
2005	Satu Kunnas (FIN)	(Finland) FC United	(Finland) FC United
2006	Laura Kalmari (FIN)	(Sweden) Djurgårdens IF Fotboll	(Finland) retired
2007	Tiina Salmén (FIN)	(Norway) Amazon Grimstad	(Finland) retired
2008	Linda Sällström (FIN)	(Sweden) Djurgårdens IF Fotboll	(Sweden) Vittsjö GIK
2009	Laura Kalmari (FIN)	(Sweden) AIK Fotboll	(Finland) retired
2010	Laura Kalmari (FIN)	(United States) Sky Blue FC	(Finland) retired
2011	Linda Sällström (FIN)	(Sweden) Linköpings FC	(Sweden) Vittsjö GIK
2012	Maija Saari (FIN)	(Sweden) AIK Fotboll	(Norway) Stabæk Fotball Kvinner
2013	Tinja-Riikka Korpela (FIN)	(Sweden) Tyresö FF	(Germany) Bayern München
2014	Tinja-Riikka Korpela (FIN)	(Germany) Bayern München	(Germany) Bayern München
2015	Tinja-Riikka Korpela (FIN)	(Germany) Bayern München	(Germany) Bayern München

== France ==
Association: Fédération Française de Football (FFF)

Award: Trophées UNFP du football

Between 1918 and 1932 the FSFSF Championship existed in France. In recent history the Division 1 Féminine is the highest division in women's football. Founded in 1974, it exists today of 12 teams. In the past 10 years the competition has been dominated by Olympique Lyonnais. France made its international debut in October 1920 against England, winning 2-0.

The Trophée UNFP was first awarded in women's football in 2001. The first winner was Anne Zenoni (Toulouse FC).

Year	First place	Club	Current Club
2001	Anne Zenoni (FRA)	(France) Toulouse FC	(France) retired
2002	Marinette Pichon (FRA)	(France) Saint-Memmie Olympique	(France) retired
2003	Sandrine Soubeyrand (FRA)	(France) FCF Juvisy	Coach France U17 (W)
2004	Sonia Bompastor (FRA)	(France) Montpellier HSC	(France) retired
2005	Marinette Pichon (FRA)	(France) FCF Juvisy	(France) retired
2006	Camille Abily (FRA)	(France) Montpellier HSC	(France) Olympique Lyonnais
2007	Camille Abily (FRA)	(France) Olympique Lyonnais	(France) Olympique Lyonnais
2008	Sonia Bompastor (FRA)	(France) Olympique Lyonnais	(France) retired
2009	Louisa Nécib (FRA)	(France) Olympique Lyonnais	(France) retired
2010	Eugénie Le Sommer (FRA)	(France) Saint-Brieuc	(France) Olympique Lyonnais
2011	Élise Bussaglia (FRA)	(France) Paris Saint-Germain	(Germany) VfL Wolfsburg
2012	Gaëtane Thiney (FRA)	(France) FCF Juvisy	(France) FCF Juvisy
2013	Lotta Schelin (SWE)	(France) Olympique Lyonnais	(Sweden) FC Rosengård
2014	Gaëtane Thiney (FRA)	(France) FCF Juvisy	(France) FCF Juvisy
2015	Eugénie Le Sommer (FRA)	(France) Olympique Lyonnais	(France) Olympique Lyonnais
2016	Amel Majri (FRA)	(France) Olympique Lyonnais	(France) Olympique Lyonnais

== Georgia ==
Association: საქართველოს ფეხბურთის ფედერაცია (GFF)

The Georgian Women's League was founded in 2014 and is currently played with 6 teams. Georgia made its debut in the qualification stage for UEFA Women's Euro 1997 losing to Yugoslavia 11-0.

No awards are currently given in women's football.

== Germany ==
Association: Deutscher Fußball-Bund (DFB)

Award: Fußballerin des Jahres

Since 1990 (after the reunification of East and West Germany) the 1.Frauen-Bundesliga is the main competition in Germany. It was first played in North- and South-divisions, and in 1997 the groups were merged to form a uniform league with 12 teams. The first appearance of the Deutsche Fußballnationalmannschaft der Frauen can be split in two... East and West. While West Germany made a promising start in November 1982 against Switzerland with a 5-1 win, the East German team only appeared once in May 1990 which resulted in a 0-3 defeat against Czechoslovakia.

The award Fußballerin des Jahres was introduced in 1996. First winner was Martina Voss (FC Rumeln-Kaldenhausen) who is currently head coach of Switzerland (W).

Year	First place	Club	Current Club
1996	Martina Voss (GER)	(Germany) FC Rumeln-Kaldenhausen	(Switzerland) Coach Swiss National Team (W)
1997	Bettina Wiegmann (GER)	(Germany) Grün-Weiß Brauweiler	Coach Germany U15 (W)
1998	Silke Rottenberg (GER)	(Germany) Sportfreunde Siegen	Coach Germany U20 (W)
1999	Inka Grings (GER)	(Germany) FCR 2001 Duisburg	(Germany) Coach MSV Duisburg (W)
2000	Martina Voss (GER)	(Germany) FCR 2001 Duisburg	(Switzerland) Coach Swiss National Team (W)
2001	Birgit Prinz (GER)	(Germany) 1. FFC Frankfurt	(Germany) retired
2002	Birgit Prinz (GER)	(Germany) 1. FFC Frankfurt	(Germany) retired
2003	Birgit Prinz (GER)	(United States) Carolina Courage	(Germany) retired
2004	Birgit Prinz (GER)	(Germany) 1. FFC Frankfurt	(Germany) retired
2005	Birgit Prinz (GER)	(Germany) 1. FFC Frankfurt	(Germany) retired
2006	Birgit Prinz (GER)	(Germany) 1. FFC Frankfurt	(Germany) retired
2007	Birgit Prinz (GER)	(Germany) 1. FFC Frankfurt	(Germany) retired
2008	Birgit Prinz (GER)	(Germany) 1. FFC Frankfurt	(Germany) retired
2009	Inka Grings (GER)	(Germany) FCR 2001 Duisburg	(Germany) Coach MSV Duisburg (W)
2010	Inka Grings (GER)	(Germany) FCR 2001 Duisburg	(Germany) Coach MSV Duisburg (W)
2011	Fatmire Bajramaj (GER)	(Germany) 1. FFC Turbine Potsdam	(Germany) retired
2012	Célia Okoyino de Mbabi (GER)	(Germany) SC 07 Bad Neuenahr	(Germany) retired
2012^{1}	Alexandra Popp (GER)	(Germany) VfL Wolfsburg	(Germany) VfL Wolfsburg
2013	Martina Müller (GER)	(Germany) VfL Wolfsburg	(Germany) retired
2013^{1}	Nadine Keßler (GER)	(Germany) VfL Wolfsburg	(Germany) retired
2014	Alexandra Popp (GER)	(Germany) VfL Wolfsburg	(Germany) VfL Wolfsburg
2014^{1}	Dzsenifer Marozsán (GER)	(Germany) 1. FFC Frankfurt	(France) Olympique Lyonnais
2015	Célia Šašić (GER)	(Germany) 1. FFC Frankfurt	(Germany) retired
2015^{1}	Lena Goeßling (GER)	(Germany) VfL Wolfsburg	(Germany) VfL Wolfsburg
2016	Alexandra Popp (GER)	(Germany) VfL Wolfsburg	(Germany) VfL Wolfsburg
2016^{1}	Isabel Kerschowski (GER)	(Germany) VfL Wolfsburg	(Germany) VfL Wolfsburg

^{1} "Nationalspielerin des Jahres": Player of the year in the National team

== Gibraltar ==
Association: Gibraltar Football Association (GFA)

The Premier League is the top level amateur women's league in Gibraltar which is played with 5 teams, and played with 9 players per side. At the moment there is no Women's National Team active.

No awards are currently given in women's football.

== Greece ==
Association: Hellenic Football Federation (HFF) / Ελληνική Ποδοσφαιρική Ομοσπονδία (ΕΠΟ)

The Pan-Hellenic Women's Football Championship (Πανελλήνιο Πρωτάθλημα Γυναικών) or "Women's Alpha Ethniki" was founded in 1987 and is the highest professional women's football league in Greece. The competition is played with 9 teams. Greece made its debut in July 1991 against Italy losing 6-0.

No awards are currently given in women's football.

== Hungary ==
Association: Magyar Labdarúgó Szövetség (MLSZ)

Award: Az év magyar labdarúgója Nők

The Női NB I ("Női Nemzeti Bajnokság" or "women's national championship") is the top level league in women's football in Hungary. Founded in 1984, the competition is played with 8 teams. Hungary played its first international match in April 1985 against West Germany and lost 1-0.

In 1985 the MLSZ launched the Az év magyar labdarúgója Nők, an award given to the best female Hungarian footballer playing either domestically or abroad. The first player to win the award was Imréné Matskássy (Renova FC).

Year	First place	Club	Current Club
1985	Imréné Matskássy (HUN)	(Hungary) Renova FC	(Hungary) deceased 2015
1986	not awarded		
1987	not awarded		
1988	not awarded		
1989	Tünde Nagy (HUN)	(Hungary) Renova FC	(Hungary) retired
1990	Tímea Főfai (HUN)	(Hungary) 1. FC Femina	(Hungary) retired
1991	Lászlóné Kiss (HUN)	(Hungary) 1. FC Femina	(Hungary) retired
1992	not awarded		
1993	Katalin Mester (HUN)	(Hungary) Renova FC	(Hungary) retired
1994	Éva Szarka (HUN)	(Hungary) László Kórház SC	(Hungary) retired
1995	Katalin Mester (HUN)	(Hungary) László Kórház SC	(Hungary) retired
1996	Györgyi Sebestyén (HUN)	(Hungary) 1. FC Femina	(Hungary) retired
1997	Szilvia Ruff (HUN)	(Hungary) László Kórház SC	(Hungary) retired
1998	Anett Nagy (HUN)	(Hungary) László Kórház SC	(Hungary) retired
1999	Anita Pádár (HUN)	(Hungary) László Kórház SC	(Hungary) retired
2000	Katalin Mester (HUN)	(Hungary) Renova FC	(Hungary) retired
2001	Aranka Paraoánu (HUN)	(Hungary) László Kórház SC	(Hungary) retired
2002	Anikó Kerekes (HUN)	(Hungary) Renova FC	(Hungary) retired
2003	Aranka Paraoánu (HUN)	(Hungary) László Kórház SC	(Hungary) retired
2004	Erzsébet Milassin (HUN)	(Hungary) László Kórház SC	(France) US Compiègne
2005	Aranka Paraoánu (HUN)	(Hungary) László Kórház SC	(Hungary) retired
2006	Anett Dombai-Nagy (HUN)	(Hungary) 1. FC Femina	(Hungary) retired
2007	Aranka Paraoánu (HUN)	(Hungary) 1. FC Femina	(Hungary) retired
2008	Zsanett Jakabfi (HUN)	(Hungary) MTK Hungária FC	(Germany) VfL Wolfsburg
2009	Zsanett Jakabfi (HUN)	(Germany) VfL Wolfsburg	(Germany) VfL Wolfsburg
2010	Zsanett Jakabfi (HUN)	(Germany) VfL Wolfsburg	(Germany) VfL Wolfsburg
2011	Anita Pádár (HUN)	(Hungary) 1. FC Femina	(Hungary) retired
2012	Fanny Vágó (HUN)	(Hungary) MTK Hungária FC	(Hungary) MTK Hungária FC
2013	Zsanett Jakabfi (HUN)	(Germany) VfL Wolfsburg	(Germany) VfL Wolfsburg
2014	Dóra Zeller (HUN)	(Hungary) Ferencvárosi TC	(Germany) TSG 1899 Hoffenheim
2015	Fanny Vágó (HUN)	(Hungary) MTK Hungária FC	(Hungary) MTK Hungária FC
2016	Zsanett Jakabfi (HUN)	(Germany) VfL Wolfsburg	(Germany) VfL Wolfsburg

== Iceland ==
Association: Knattspyrnusamband Íslands (KSÍ)

Award: Knattspyrnukona ársins

The Úrvalsdeild kvenna is the premier division of the Icelandic women's football league. Founded in 1972, it is now played with 10 teams. In September 1981, Iceland made its debut against Scotland losing 3-2.

The knattspyrnumaður og knattspyrnukona ársins award was introduced in 1973. Between 1973 and 1996 this award could be won by both male and female players. In 1994 was Ásta Breiðfjörð Gunnlaugsdóttir (Breiðablik UBK) was the first woman to win the award. In 1997 the awards for best male and female player were split. Guðrún Jóna Kristjánsdóttir (Knattspyrnufélag Reykjavíkur) was the winner of the new award.

Year	First place	Club	Current Club
1994^{1}	Ásta Breiðfjörð Gunnlaugsdóttir (ISL)	(Iceland) Breiðablik UBK	(Iceland) retired
1997	Guðrún Jóna Kristjánsdóttir (ISL)	(Iceland) Knattspyrnufélag Reykjavíkur	(Iceland) unknown
1998	Katrín Jónsdóttir (ISL)	(Norway) Kolbotn Fotball	(Iceland) retired
1999	Guðlaug Jónsdóttir (ISL)	(Iceland) Knattspyrnufélag Reykjavíkur	(Iceland) unknown
2000	Rakel Ögmundsdóttir (ISL)	(Iceland) Breiðablik UBK	(Iceland) unknown
2001	Olga Færseth (ISL)	(Iceland) Knattspyrnufélag Reykjavíkur	(Iceland) retired
2002	Ásthildur Helgadóttir (ISL)	(Iceland) Breiðablik UBK	(Iceland) retired
2003	Ásthildur Helgadóttir (ISL)	(Iceland) Breiðablik UBK	(Iceland) retired
2004	Margrét Lára Viðarsdóttir (ISL)	(Iceland) ÍBV	(Iceland) Valur
2005	Ásthildur Helgadóttir (ISL)	(Sweden) Malmö FF	(Iceland) retired
2006	Margrét Lára Viðarsdóttir (ISL)	(Iceland) Valur	(Iceland) Valur
2007	Margrét Lára Viðarsdóttir (ISL)	(Germany) FCR 2001 Duisburg	(Iceland) Valur
2008	Margrét Lára Viðarsdóttir (ISL)	(Iceland) Valur	(Iceland) Valur
2009	Þóra Björg Helgadóttir (ISL)	(Belgium) RSC Anderlecht	(Iceland) retired
2010	Hólmfríður Magnúsdóttir (ISL)	(United States) Philadelphia Independence	(Norway) Avaldsnes IL
2011	Margrét Lára Viðarsdóttir (ISL)	(Sweden) Kristianstads DFF	(Iceland) Valur
2012	Þóra Björg Helgadóttir (ISL)	(Sweden) LdB FC Malmö	(Iceland) retired
2013	Sara Björk Gunnarsdóttir (ISL)	(Sweden) LdB FC Malmö	(Germany) VfL Wolfsburg
2014	Harpa Þorsteinsdóttir (ISL)	(Iceland) Stjarnan FC	(Iceland) Stjarnan FC
2015	Sara Björk Gunnarsdóttir (ISL)	(Sweden) FC Rosengård	(Germany) VfL Wolfsburg
2016	Sara Björk Gunnarsdóttir (ISL)	(Germany) VfL Wolfsburg	(Germany) VfL Wolfsburg

^{1} (1973-1996) Initially, the award could have been given to both male and female players. Ásta Breiðfjörð Gunnlaugsdóttir won in 1994, and this was the first and only time a woman won the award. In 1997, the award was split into men and women's categories.

== Ireland ==
Association: Women's Football Association of Ireland (WFAI)

Award: FAI Senior Women's International Player of the Year

The Women's National league (WNL) or "Sraith Náisiúnta na mBan" is the top level women's league in the Irish Republic. Founded as "Ladies League of Ireland" in 1973, the domestic competition was reformed in 2011 and is now played with 7 teams. The Irish National Team made its first appearance in April 1973 against Scotland losing 10-1.

The FAI Senior Women's International Player of the Year was first awarded in 1997. Bernie Reilly (Shamrock Rovers F.C.) was the first winner.

Year	First place	Club	Current Club
1997	Bernie Reilly (IRL)	(Republic of Ireland) Shamrock Rovers F.C.	(Republic of Ireland) unknown
1998	Yvonne Lyons (IRL)	(Republic of Ireland) Benfica W.S.C.	(Republic of Ireland) unknown
1999	Claire Scanlan (IRL)	(United States) Troy University	(Republic of Ireland) Coaching staff FAI
2000	Ciara Grant (IRL)	(England) Arsenal L.F.C.	(Republic of Ireland) retired
2001	Olivia O'Toole (IRL)	(Republic of Ireland) Shamrock Rovers F.C.	(Republic of Ireland) retired
2002	Yvonne Tracy (IRL)	(England) Arsenal L.F.C.	(England) Arsenal L.F.C.
2003	not awarded		
2004	Elaine O'Connor (IRL)	(United States) Hofstra Pride	(Republic of Ireland) retired
2005	Michele O'Brien (IRL)	(United States) Long Island Rough Riders (UWS)	(United States) Chicago Red Eleven
2006	Alisha Moran (IRL)	(United States) Harvard University	(Republic of Ireland) unknown
2007	Emma Byrne (IRL)	(England) Arsenal L.F.C.	(England) Coaching staff Arsenal Academy
2008	Niamh Fahey (IRL)	(England) Arsenal L.F.C.	(England) Chelsea L.F.C.
2009	Niamh Fahey (IRL)	(England) Arsenal L.F.C.	(England) Chelsea L.F.C.
2010	Fiona O'Sullivan (IRL)	(Sweden) AIK Fotboll	(Republic of Ireland) retired
2011	Niamh Fahey (IRL)	(England) Arsenal L.F.C.	(England) Chelsea L.F.C.
2012	Emma Byrne (IRL)	(England) Arsenal L.F.C.	(England) Coaching staff Arsenal Academy
2013	Louise Quinn (IRL)	(Sweden) Eskilstuna United DFF	(Republic of Ireland) retired
2014	Julie-Ann Russell (IRL)	(Republic of Ireland) UCD Waves	(Republic of Ireland) UCD Waves
2015	Denise O'Sullivan (IRL)	(Scotland) Glasgow City F.C.	(United States) Houston Dash

== Israel ==
Association: Israel Football Association (IFA) / ההתאחדות לכדורגל בישראל

The Ligat Nashim (ליגת נשים) is the Israeli women's league and was founded in 1998. The league is divided in two divisions. The Women's Premier league (Ligat Nashim Rishona) which is played with 9 teams, and the Second Women's League (Ligat Nashim Shniya) played by a variable number of teams depending on registration. The Israeli women's national football team first appeared in 1970 with domestic clubs being formed in the years following. Israels' first official match was played in August 1977, in which they were defeated 12-0 in and against The Netherlands.

No awards are currently given in women's football.

== Italy ==
Association: Federazione Italiana Giuoco Calcio (FIGC)

Award: Calciatrice dell'anno

The Serie A is the highest-level league competition for women in Italy. Founded in 1968, the league is played with 12 teams. Italy made its debut in international football in February 1968 winning 2-1 against Czechoslovakia.

The Calciatrice dell'anno is a yearly award which was first introduced in 2012. The first winner Melania Gabbiadini (A.S.D. AGSM Verona F.C.) has won the award four times in a row, and is thus the only winner so far.

Year	First place	Club	Current Club
2012	Melania Gabbiadini (ITA)	(Italy) A.S.D. AGSM Verona F.C.	(Italy) A.S.D. AGSM Verona F.C.
2013	Melania Gabbiadini (ITA)	(Italy) A.S.D. AGSM Verona F.C.	(Italy) A.S.D. AGSM Verona F.C.
2014	Melania Gabbiadini (ITA)	(Italy) A.S.D. AGSM Verona F.C.	(Italy) A.S.D. AGSM Verona F.C.
2015	Melania Gabbiadini (ITA)	(Italy) A.S.D. AGSM Verona F.C.	(Italy) A.S.D. AGSM Verona F.C.

== Latvia ==
Year	First place	Club	Current Club
2012	Guna Āboliņa (LAT)	(Latvia) FC Skonto/Cerība	(Latvia) FC Skonto/Cerība
2013	Olga Ivanova (LAT)	(Estonia) Pärnu JK	(Estonia) Pärnu JK
2014	Olga Matīsa (LAT)	(Latvia) Rīgas FS	(Latvia) Rīgas FS
2015	Ieva Bidermane (LAT)	(Latvia) Riga United FC	(Latvia) Riga United FC
2016	Marija Ibragimova (LAT)	(Latvia) Rīgas FS	(Latvia) Rīgas FS

== Moldova ==
Year	First place	Club	Current Club
2004	Olga Tanscaia (MDA)	Unknown	Retired

== Netherlands ==
Year	First place	Club	Current Club
2001	Jolanda Verschuren (NED)	(Netherlands) unknown	(Netherlands) unknown
2002	Yvonne Veerman (NED)	(Netherlands) unknown	(Netherlands) unknown
2003	Annemieke Kiesel (NED)	(Netherlands) SV Saestum	(Netherlands) retired
2004	Daphne Koster (NED)	(Netherlands) Ter Leede	(Netherlands) AFC Ajax
2005	Daphne Koster (NED)	(Netherlands) Ter Leede	(Netherlands) AFC Ajax
2006	Gilanne Louwaars (NED)	(Netherlands) SV Saestum	(Netherlands) retired
2007	Marloes de Boer (NED)	(Netherlands) FC Twente	(Netherlands) retired
2008	Femke Maes (BEL)	(Netherlands) Willem II	(Belgium) retired
2009	Jeanine Van Dalen (NED)	(Netherlands) ADO Den Haag	(Netherlands) retired
2009	Sheila van den Bulk (NED)	(Netherlands) ADO Den Haag	(Norway) Djurgårdens IF Fotboll
2010	Kim Dolstra (NED)	(Netherlands) AZ Alkmaar	(Italy) A.S.D. AGSM Verona F.C.
2011	Jorike Olde Loohuis (NED)	(Netherlands) SC Heerenveen	(Netherlands) Oranje Nassau Groningen
2012	Tessa Oudejans (NED)	(Netherlands) FC Utrecht	(Netherlands) FC Utrecht
2013	Renate Jansen (NED)	(Netherlands) ADO Den Haag	(Netherlands) FC TWente
2014	Vivianne Miedema (NED)	(Netherlands) SC Heerenveen	(Germany) FC Bayern München
2014^{1}	Tessa Wullaert (BEL)	(Belgium) Standard Liège	(Germany) VfL Wolfsburg
2015^{1}	Lineth Beerensteyn (NED)	(Netherlands) ADO Den Haag	(Netherlands) FC Twente

^{1} BeNe League Bottega Player of the year (joined award Belgium & Netherlands)

== Norway ==
Year	First place	Club	Current Club
2015^{1}	Ada Hegerberg (NOR)	(France) Olympique Lyonnais	(France) Olympique Lyonnais
2016^{1}	Ada Hegerberg (NOR)	(France) Olympique Lyonnais	(France) Olympique Lyonnais

^{1} (1990–present) The award could have been given to both male and female players.

== Sweden ==
Year	First place	Club	Current Club
1980	Anna Svenjeby (SWE)	(Sweden) Kronängs IF	(Sweden) retired
1981	Pia Sundhage (SWE)	(Sweden) Jitex BK	(Sweden) Coach Swedish National Team (W)
1982	Anette Börjesson (SWE)	(Sweden) Jitex BK	(Sweden) retired
1983	Elisabeth Leidinge (SWE)	(Sweden) Jitex BK	(Sweden) retired
1984	Lena Videkull (SWE)	(Sweden) Trollhättans IF	(Sweden) retired
1985	Eva Andersson (SWE)	(Sweden) GIF Sundsvall	(Sweden) retired
1986	Gunilla Axén (SWE)	(Sweden) Gideonsbergs IF	(Sweden) retired
1987	Eleonor Hultin (SWE)	(Sweden) GAIS	(Sweden) retired
1988	Lena Videkull (SWE)	(Sweden) Öxabäcks IF	(Sweden) retired
1989	Eleonor Hultin (SWE)	(Sweden) Jitex BK	(Sweden) retired
1990	Eva Zeikfalvy (SWE)	(Sweden) Malmö FF	(Sweden) retired
1991	Elisabeth Leidinge (SWE)	(Sweden) Jitex BK	(Sweden) retired
1992	Anneli Andelén (SWE)	(Sweden) öxabäcks IF	(Sweden) retired
1993	Lena Videkull (SWE)	(Sweden) Malmö FF	(Sweden) retired
1994	Kristin Bengtsson (SWE)	(Sweden) Hammarby IF	(Sweden) retired
1995	Malin Andersson (SWE)	(Sweden) Älvsjö AIK	(Sweden) retired
1996	Malin Swedberg (SWE)	(Sweden) Älvsjö AIK	(Sweden) retired
1997	Ulrika Karlsson (SWE)	(Sweden) Bälinge IF	(Sweden) retired
1998	Victoria Svensson (SWE)	(Sweden) Älvsjö AIK	(Sweden) retired
1999	Cecilia Sandell (SWE)	(Sweden) Älvsjö AIK	(Sweden) retired
2000	Tina Nordlund (SWE)	(Sweden) Umeå IK	(Sweden) retired
2001	Malin Moström (SWE)	(Sweden) Umeå IK	(Sweden) retired
2002	Hanna Ljungberg (SWE)	(Sweden) Umeå IK	(Sweden) retired
2003	Victoria Svensson (SWE)	(Sweden) Djurgården/Älvsjö	(Sweden) retired
2004	Kristin Bengtsson (SWE)	(Sweden) Djurgården/Älvsjö	(Sweden) retired
2005	Hanna Marklund (SWE)	(Sweden) Sunnanå SK	(Sweden) retired
2006	Lotta Schelin (SWE)	(Sweden) Kopparbergs/Göteborg FC	(Sweden) FC Rosengård
2007	Therese Sjögran (SWE)	(Sweden) LdB FC Malmö	(Sweden) retired
2008	Frida Östberg (SWE)	(Sweden) Umeå IK	(Sweden) retired
2009	Caroline Seger (SWE)	(Sweden) Linköpings FC	(France) Olympique Lyonnais
2010	Therese Sjögran (SWE)	(Sweden) LdB FC Malmö	(Sweden) retired
2011	Lotta Schelin (SWE)	(France) Olympique Lyonnais	(Sweden) FC Rosengård
2012	Lotta Schelin (SWE)	(France) Olympique Lyonnais	(Sweden) FC Rosengård
2013	Lotta Schelin (SWE)	(France) Olympique Lyonnais	(Sweden) FC Rosengård
2014	Lotta Schelin (SWE)	(France) Olympique Lyonnais	(Sweden) FC Rosengård
2015	Hedvig Lindahl (SWE)	(England) Chelsea L.F.C.	(England) Chelsea L.F.C.
2016	Hedvig Lindahl (SWE)	(England) Chelsea L.F.C.	(England) Chelsea L.F.C.

== Switzerland ==
Year	First place	Club	Current Club
1998	Sonja Spinner (SWI)	(Switzerland) SV Seebach	(Switzerland) retired
1999	Kathrin Lehmann (SWI)	(Germany) FC Bayern München	(Switzerland) retired
2000	Beatrice Mettler (SWI)	(Switzerland) FFC United Schwerzenbach	(Switzerland) retired
2001	Mirjam Berz (SWI)	(Switzerland) FFC Bern	(Switzerland) retired
2002	Monica Di Fonzo (SWI)	(Switzerland) DFC Sursee	(Switzerland) retired
2003	Prisca Steinegger (SWI)	(Switzerland) SV Seebach	(Switzerland) retired
2004	Lara Dickenmann (SWI)	(Switzerland) DFC Sursee	(Germany) VfL Wolfsburg
2005	Marisa Brunner (SWI)	(Switzerland) LUwin.ch	(Switzerland) retired
2006	Vanessa Bürki (SWI)	(Switzerland) FFC Zuchwil 05	(Germany) FC Bayern München
2007	Marisa Brunner (SWI)	(Germany) SC Freiburg	(Switzerland) retired
2008	Marina Keller (SWI)	(Switzerland) FFC United Schwerzenbach	(Switzerland) FC Zürich
2009	Ramona Bachmann (SWI)	(Sweden) Umeå IK	(England) Chelsea L.F.C.
2010	Caroline Abbé (SWI)	(Switzerland) FC Yverdon	(Germany) FC Bayern München
2011	Lara Dickenmann (SWI)	(France) Olympique Lyonnais	(Germany) VfL Wolfsburg
2012	Lara Dickenmann (SWI)	(France) Olympique Lyonnais	(Germany) VfL Wolfsburg
2013	Lara Dickenmann (SWI)	(France) Olympique Lyonnais	(Germany) VfL Wolfsburg
2014	Lara Dickenmann (SWI)	(France) Olympique Lyonnais	(Germany) VfL Wolfsburg
2015	Ramona Bachmann (SWI)	(Sweden) FC Rosengård	(England) Chelsea L.F.C.
2016	Lara Dickenmann (SWI)	(Germany) VfL Wolfsburg	(Germany) VfL Wolfsburg

== Wales ==
Year	First place	Club	Current Club
2011	Jess Fishlock (WAL)	(England) Bristol Academy W.F.C.	(Australia) Melbourne City FC
2012	Jess Fishlock (WAL)	(England) Bristol Academy W.F.C.	(Australia) Melbourne City FC
2013	Jess Fishlock (WAL)	(United States) Seattle Reign FC	(Australia) Melbourne City FC
2014	Jess Fishlock (WAL)	(United States) Seattle Reign FC	(Australia) Melbourne City FC
2015	Kylie Davies (WAL)	(England) Reading L.F.C.	(England) Reading L.F.C.
2016	Natasha Harding (WAL)	(England) Liverpool L.F.C.	(England) Liverpool L.F.C.
