= Sanna Valkonen =

Finnish footballer (born 1977)

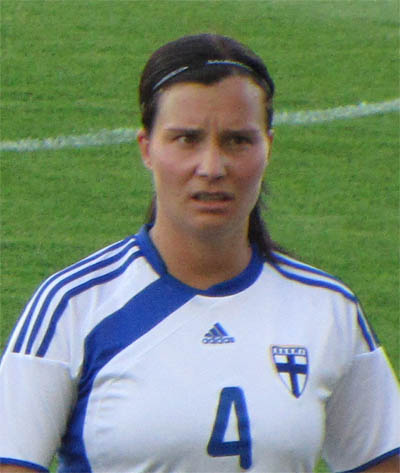

Personal information
- Full name: Sanna Margit Valkonen
- Date of birth: 12 December 1977 (age 48)
- Place of birth: Hyvinkää, Finland
- Height: 1.73 m (5 ft 8 in)
- Position: Defender

Senior career*
Years	Team	Apps	(Gls)
1994	Kontu		
1995–1996	PuiU		
1997	MPS		
1998–2002	HJK		
2002	Boston Renegades		
2002–2005	Umeå		
2006–2007	AIK		
2008–2010	Örebro	62	(0)

International career
1995–2010	Finland	120	(7)
- * Club domestic league appearances and goals

Sanna Margit Valkonen (born 12 December 1977) is a Finnish former football defender. She played for KontU, PuiU, MPS and HJK Helsinki in the Naisten Liiga, Boston Renegades in the W-League, and Umeå IK, AIK Fotboll and KIF Örebro in the Damallsvenskan. She was named Finnish Footballer of the Year in 2001 and 2002.

She was a member of the Finnish national team for fifteen years, and played the 2005 and 2009 European Championships, serving as the team's captain. She was as of 2014 the second most capped Finnish player with 120 games, behind only Laura Österberg Kalmari with 130.

== Titles ==
- 2 UEFA Women's Cups (2003, 2004)
- 5 Finnish Leagues (1994, 1998, 1999, 2000, 2001)
- 6 Finnish Cups (1996, 1997, 1998, 1999, 2000, 2002)
- 2 Swedish Leagues (2002, 2005)
- 3 Swedish Cups (2002, 2003, 2010)
