= 1999 Women's U.S. Cup =

Tournament details
- Host country: United States
- Dates: October 3–10, 1999
- Teams: 4 (from 4 confederations)

The third Women's U.S. Cup tournament held in 1999, were joined by four teams: Brazil, Finland, South Korea and USA.

== Matches ==
| October 3 Round-robin | Brazil | 3–1 | Finland | Columbus, Ohio |
| 1:00pm ET | Maicon 42'; Roseli 45', 78' | | Heikari 68' | Stadium: Crew Stadium; Attendance: 23,101 |

| October 3 Round-robin | United States | 5–0 | South Korea | Columbus, Ohio |
| 3:30pm ET | Parlow 10'; Hamm 36'; Milbrett 40'; Fotopoulos 82', 90+' | | | Stadium: Crew Stadium; Attendance: 23,101 |

| October 7 Round-robin | Brazil | 4–0 | South Korea | Kansas City, Missouri |
| 5:00pm CT | Roseli 39', 53'; Raquel 54', 74' | | | Stadium: Arrowhead Stadium; Attendance: 36,405 |

| October 7 Round-robin | United States | 6–0 | Finland | Kansas City, Missouri |
| 7:30pm CT | Milbrett 9'; Fawcett 13'; Whalen 36'; Lilly 54', 63'; Uusi-Luomalahti 88' (o.g.) | | | Stadium: Arrowhead Stadium; Attendance: 36,405 |

| October 10 Round-robin | Finland | 3–0 | South Korea | Louisville, Kentucky |
| 10:30am ET | Kackur 18'; Heikari 58', 84' | | | Stadium: Papa John's Cardinal Stadium; Attendance: 35,211 |

| October 10 Round-robin | United States | 4–2 | Brazil | Louisville, Kentucky |
| 1:00pm ET | Hamm 18', 60'; Lilly 38', 88' | | Nildinha 21', 30' | Stadium: Papa John's Cardinal Stadium; Attendance: 35,211 |

== Final placing ==
| Rank | Team | Matches | | | | Goals | | Points |
| Rank | Team | Played | Win | Draw | Loss | Scored | Against | Points |
|---|---|---|---|---|---|---|---|---|
| 1 | United States | 3 | 3 | 0 | 0 | 15 | 2 | 9 |
| 2 | Brazil | 3 | 2 | 0 | 1 | 9 | 5 | 6 |
| 3 | Finland | 3 | 1 | 0 | 2 | 4 | 9 | 3 |
| 4 | South Korea | 3 | 0 | 0 | 3 | 0 | 12 | 0 |

== Goal scorers ==
| Position | Player | Goals |
|---|---|---|
| 1 | (United States) Kristine Lilly | 4 |
| 1 | (Brazil) Roseli de Belo | 4 |
| 2 | (United States) Mia Hamm | 3 |
| 2 | (Finland) Susanna Heikari | 3 |
| 3 | (United States) Danielle Fotopoulos | 2 |
| 3 | (Brazil) Nildinha | 2 |
| 3 | (Brazil) Raquel | 2 |
| 4 | (United States) Joy Fawcett | 1 |
| 4 | (Finland) Heidi Kackur | 1 |
| 4 | (Brazil) Maicon | 1 |
| 4 | (United States) Tiffeny Milbrett | 1 |
| 4 | (United States) Cindy Parlow | 1 |
| 4 | (United States) Sara Whalen | 1 |
| 4 | (United States) Christie Welsh | 1 |
| | (Finland) Terhi Uusi-Luomalahti for (United States) | own goal |
