= Hanna Ekström =

Finnish association football player

Personal information
- Date of birth: December 25, 1973 (age 52)
- Place of birth: Helsinki, Finland
- Position: Forward

Senior career*
Years	Team	Apps	(Gls)
1994–1999	HJK		
2000	AC Vantaa		
2001	MPS		

International career
1995-2001	Finland	37	(7)
- * Club domestic league appearances and goals

Hanna Ekström (born 25 December 1972) is a retired Finnish footballer who played for HJK and the Finnish women's national team. Between 1994 and 1999, Ekström won the Finnish Champsionship 5 times and the Finnish Cup twice whilst with HJK.

== International career ==
Ekström played for Finland 37 international times and scored 7 goals.

== Honours ==
HJK

- Finnish League: 1995, 1996, 1997, 1998, 1999
- Finnish Cup: 1998, 1999
