= Kirsi Koskela =

Finnish association football player

Personal information
- Date of birth: 2 September 1962 (age 64)
- Position: Goalkeeper

International career
Years	Team	Apps	(Gls)
1974-1979	Finland	21	(0)

Kirsi Koskela (born 2 September 1962) is a retired Finnish footballer who played for HJK and the Finnish women's national team.

After retiring from football, Koskela has worked as the head coach of Malmin Palloseura.

== International career ==
Koskela represented Finland 21 times between 1978 and 1983.

== Honours ==
=== HJK ===
- Finnish Leagues: 1991, 1992
- Finnish Cup: 1991, 1992
