= Terhi Uusi-Luomalahti =

Finnish footballer (born 1974)

Personal information
- Full name: Terhi Uusi-Luomalahti
- Date of birth: 20 February 1974 (age 52)
- Place of birth: Järvenpää, Finland
- Height: 1.59 m (5 ft 2 1/2 in)
- Position: Defender

Senior career*
Years	Team	Apps	(Gls)
- JäPS
1991	PuiU		
1992–2004	HJK		
2005	Espoo		
2006	PuiU		

International career
1992–2005	Finland	60	(7)
- * Club domestic league appearances and goals

Terhi Uusi-Luomalahti (born 20 February 1974) is a Finnish former football defender who played for HJK Helsinki, among other teams, in the Naisten Liiga. She was a member of the Finland national team for thirteen years, taking part in the 2005 European Championship.

== Titles ==
- 7 Finnish Leagues (1995 — 2001)
- 4 Finnish Cups (1998 — 2000, 2002)
