= Miia Niemi =

Finnish footballer (born 1983)

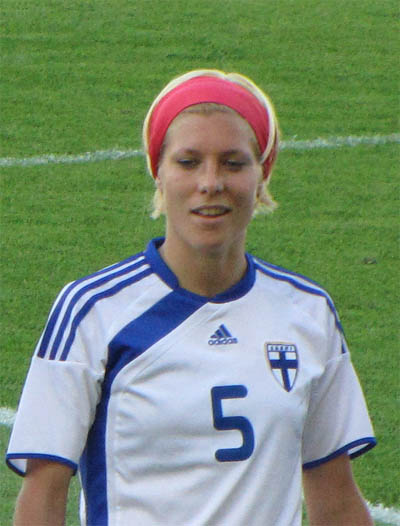

Personal information
- Full name: Miia-Maarit Niemi
- Date of birth: 9 July 1983 (age 43)
- Height: 1.67 m (5 ft 5 1/2 in)
- Position: Defender

Senior career*
Years	Team	Apps	(Gls)
- HJK
2008–2010	Amazon Grimstad		
2011	Klepp IL	12	(0)

International career^{‡}
2003–2010	Finland	46	(0)
- * Club domestic league appearances and goals as of 19:54, 3 December 2013 (UTC) ‡ National team caps and goals as of 19:54, 3 December 2013 (UTC)

Miia-Maarit Niemi (born 9 July 1983) is a Finnish former footballer who played in the Norwegian Toppserien for Amazon Grimstad and Klepp IL, as well as HJK in her home country. After making her debut for the Finland women's national football team in 2003, Niemi accrued 46 caps and played at UEFA Women's Euro 2009.

== Club career ==
A versatile defender, Niemi won two Naisten Liiga titles with HJK in 2001 and 2005, as well as a Naisten Cup in 2002. She was also part of the HJK team which reached the semi-finals of the inaugural UEFA Women's Cup in 2001–02.

Having moved to Norway for the 2008 season, Niemi played for Amazon Grimstad then retired after an injury-disrupted final season with Klepp IL in 2011.

== International career ==
She made her debut for the senior Finland team on 9 March 2003; playing 17 minutes as a substitute against Sweden in Eskilstuna. Niemi was left out of the squad for UEFA Women's Euro 2005, but featured in one of Finland's matches at UEFA Women's Euro 2009, a 1–0 defeat to Ukraine.

Niemi's final appearances for the national team came at the 2010 Algarve Cup, versus Denmark.
