= Essi Sainio =

Finnish footballer (born 1986)

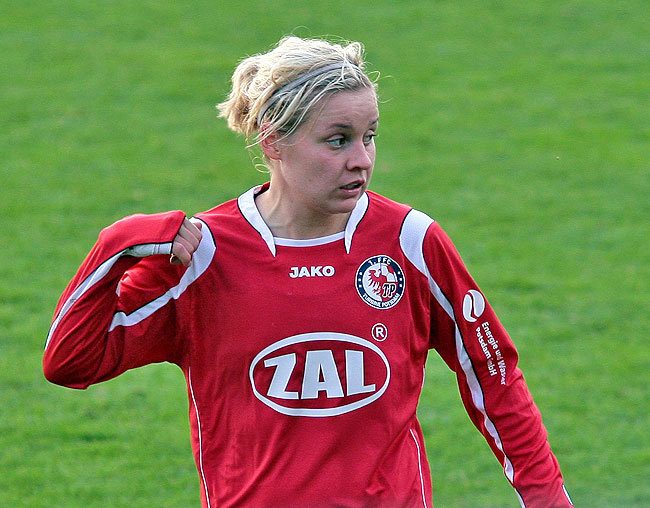
- Sainio with Turbine Potsdam in 2009

Personal information
- Full name: Essi Katriina Sainio
- Date of birth: 9 September 1986 (age 40)
- Place of birth: Helsinki, Finland
- Height: 1.68 m (5 ft 6 in)
- Positions: Winger; full back

Youth career
- Kasiysi
- Espoo
- Honka

Senior career*
Years	Team	Apps	(Gls)
2002-2003	Espoo	28	(1)
2004	MPS	0	(0)
2004-2005	Honka	32	(11)
2005–2006	HJK	5	(2)
2006–2009	Turbine Potsdam	42	(3)
2009–2010	AIK	7	(1)
2010–2012	Freiburg	34	(11)
2015–2022	HJK	152	(34)

International career^{‡}
2006–2022	Finland	48	(3)
- * Club domestic league appearances and goals as of 20:10, 8 November 2020 (UTC) ‡ National team caps and goals as of 2020-10-27

Essi Katriina Sainio (born 9 September 1986) is a Finnish former professional footballer, who last played for HJK in Finland as a winger. She played for SC Freiburg of Germany's Frauen-Bundesliga, before having a few years break due personal reasons. She previously played for Turbine Potsdam, winning the German Bundesliga title in 2009, and for AIK of the Swedish Damallsvenskan. Sainio began her senior career with Naisten Liiga clubs FC Honka and HJK in her home country. Since making her debut in 2006, Sainio has won 45 caps and scored three goals for the Finland women's national football team. A winger who can also play as a full-back, she was part of the Finnish team which hosted UEFA Women's Euro 2009 and reached the quarter-finals.

== Club career ==
Her career began at the age of nine years at FC Kasiysi Espoo. She then moved to FC Espoo and FC Honka Espoo and arrived at HJK Helsinki in 2005.

Her transfer from the German Frauen-Bundesliga team 1. FFC Turbine Potsdam to the Swedish Damallsvenskan club AIK was announced in May 2009. At AIK Sainio made seven appearances and scored one goal before suffering an anterior cruciate ligament injury in 2010. She was allowed to move back to Germany with SC Freiburg in July 2010.

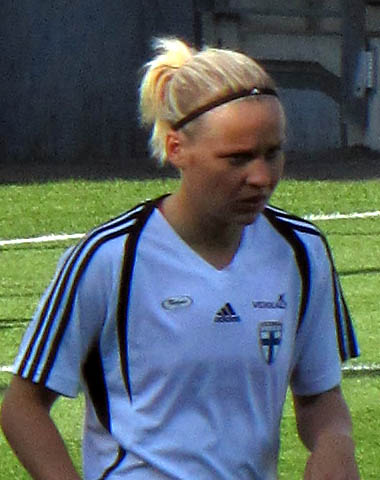
With Finland's national team in 2009

== International career ==
Sainio made her debut in the Finnish national team on 5 June 2006 against Belgium. A few weeks later she signed a three-year deal with the then German champion 1. FFC Turbine Potsdam. During the 2006 FIFA U-20 Women's World Championship in Russia, she suffered a fracture of her middle foot. She then suffered the same fracture in March 2007 at the Algarve Cup and again in July 2007 at the Nordic Cup.

National coach Michael Käld selected Sainio in the squad for UEFA Women's Euro 2009, which Finland were hosting. She started the 3–2 quarter-final defeat by England, but was substituted for Annica Sjölund early in the second half.
