= Pauliina Auveri =

Finnish footballer (born 1972)

Personal information
- Date of birth: 10 February 1972 (age 54)
- Position: Midfielder

International career
Years	Team	Apps	(Gls)
1990–1996	Finland	29	(4)

Pauliina Auveri (born 10 February 1972) is a Finnish former footballer who played for HJK and the Finnish women's national team.

== Honours ==
HJK

- 4 Finnish Leagues
- 3 Finnish Cups
