= Tiina Lehtola =

Finnish footballer (born 1962)

Personal information
- Date of birth: 5 November 1962 (age 63)
- Position: Midfielder

International career
Years	Team	Apps	(Gls)
1983-1991	Finland	29	(1)

Tiina Lehtola (born 3 August 1962) is a retired Finnish footballer who played for HJK and the Finnish women's national team. Lehtola won 1 league championship and 3 Finnish Cup's with HJK.

Before becoming a footballer Lehotla was national ski champion.

== Honours ==
=== HJK ===
- 1 Finnish Leagues
- 3 Finnish Cups
