= Satu Kunnas =

Finnish footballer (born 1977)

Personal information
- Date of birth: 3 September 1977 (age 49)
- Place of birth: Helsinki, Finland
- Position: Goalkeeper

Senior career*
Years	Team	Apps	(Gls)
- HJK Helsinki
- Asker
–2005	Fløya		
2005–	FC United		

International career^{‡}
1996–2005	Finland	46	(0)
- * Club domestic league appearances and goals as of 09:40, 6 March 2021 (UTC) ‡ National team caps and goals as of 19:35, 5 March 2021 (UTC)

Satu Kunnas (born 3 September 1977) is a Finnish former footballer who played as a goalkeeper. She made 46 appearances for the Finland women's national football team between 1996 and 2005. She played club football for multiple teams in Finland and Norway.

== Personal life ==
Kunnas was born on 3 September 1977 in Helsinki, Finland. In 2006, she started training to become a police officer.

== Career ==
At club level, Kunnas played for HJK Helsinki, where she won the 1995 Kansallinen Liiga. She later played for Norwegian teams Asker and Fløya. In 2005, Kunnas returned to Finland to play for FC United. She played in the 2005–06 UEFA Women's Cup for FC United. In a UEFA Cup match against Røa IL, Kunnas sustained a knee injury which sidelined her for six months.

Kunnas made her international debut for Finland in a 1996 Algarve Cup match against Sweden. After making one appearance per year in 1996, 1997 and 1998, she became Finland's main goalkeeper after Johanna Lindell retired in 2004. That year, she was part of the first Finland team to qualify for the UEFA Women's Championship. Kunnas represented Finland at UEFA Women's Euro 2005, where they finished joint third, after losing their semi-final 4–1 to Germany. She was praised by teammate Laura Kalmari for her performance in Finland's group stage match against Denmark, a match they won 2–1. She retired from international football after UEFA Euro 2005. In total, Kunnas made 46 appearances for Finland.

== Awards ==
In 2005, she was awarded the Finland Women's Player of the Year award. She was also shortlisted for FIFA World Player of the Year in the same year.
