= Hanna-Mari Sarlin =

Finnish footballer (born 1964)

Personal information
- Date of birth: 7 October 1964 (age 62)
- Position: Midfielder

International career
Years	Team	Apps	(Gls)
	Finland	47	(5)

Hanna-Mari Sarlin (born 1964) is a Finnish former footballer and floorball player who played as a midfielder for HJK and the Finnish women's national team. Since retiring from professional football, she became the director of Education in Siuntio.

== Honours ==
HJK

- 10 Finnish Leagues
- 4 Finnish Cups
