= Estonian Female Footballer of the Year =

Estonian award

The Estonian Female Footballer of the Year is an annual award given to the best Estonian women's association footballer.

== Winners ==
| Year | Player | Club |
|---|---|---|
| 1994 | Aire Lepik | (Estonia) Tulevik |
| 1995 | Aire Lepik (2) | (Estonia) Tulevik |
| 1996 | Maaren Olander | (Sweden) Östervåla IF |
| 1997 | Anastassia Morkovkina | (Estonia) TKSK Arsenal |
| 1998 | Maaren Olander (2) | (Estonia) Flora |
| 1999 | Annika Tammela | (Estonia) Pärnu |
| 2000 | Anastassia Morkovkina (2) | (Estonia) Pärnu |
| 2001 | Maria Filatova | (Estonia) TKSK Visa |
| 2002 | Anastassia Morkovkina (3) | (Estonia) Pärnu |
| 2003 | Anastassia Morkovkina (4) | (Estonia) Pärnu |
| 2004 | Anastassia Morkovkina (5) | (Estonia) Pärnu |
| 2005 | Anastassia Morkovkina (6) | (Estonia) Pärnu |
| 2006 | Ave Pajo | (Estonia) Tallinna Kalev |
| 2007 | Reelika Vaher | (Estonia) Levadia |
| 2008 | Kaidi Jekimova | (Estonia) Levadia |
| 2009 | Anastassia Morkovkina (7) | (Estonia) Pärnu |
| 2010 | Anastassia Morkovkina (8) | (Estonia) Pärnu |
| 2011 | Signy Aarna | (Estonia) Lootos |
| 2012 | Pille Raadik | (Finland) Åland United |
| 2013 | Getter Laar | (France) Guingamp |
| 2014 | Kethy Õunpuu | (Estonia) Flora |
| 2015 | Signy Aarna (2) | (Finland) Pallokissat |
| 2016 | Inna Zlidnis | (Hungary) Ferencváros |
| 2017 | Inna Zlidnis (2) | (Hungary) Ferencváros |
| 2018 | Katrin Loo | (Estonia) Flora |
| 2019 | Inna Zlidnis (3) | (Hungary) Ferencváros |
| 2020 | Kristina Bannikova | (Estonia) Vaprus |
| 2021 | Inna Zlidnis (4) | (Hungary) Ferencváros |
| 2022 | Vlada Kubassova | (Italy) Como Women |
| 2023 | Lisette Tammik | (Estonia) Flora |
| 2024 | Vlada Kubassova (2) | (Hungary) Ferencváros |
| 2025 | Siret Räämet | (Austria) LASK |

== See also ==
- List of sports awards honoring women
