= Olga Tanscaia =

Moldovan footballer and futsal and women's football referee

Personal information
- Date of birth: 9 January 1975 (age 51)
- Positions: Forward; midfielder

International career
Years	Team	Apps	(Gls)
2001–2006	Moldova	8	(0)

Olga Tanscaia (born 9 January 1975) is a Moldovan former footballer who played as a forward and a midfielder. She has been a member of the Moldova women's national team. She became a referee for futsal and women's football after playing retirement.

== International career ==
Tanscaia capped for Moldova at senior level during two FIFA Women's World Cup qualifications (2003 and 2007).

== Honours ==
=== Individual ===
- 2004 Best Moldovan Female Footballer of the Year
