= Näsets SK =

Sports club, Göteborg, Sweden

- Full name: Näsets Sportklubb
- Founded: 1953
- Ground: Åkeredsvallen; Västra Frölunda; Sweden
- Chairman: Christina Wallberg
- League: Division 4 Göteborg B
Home colours	Away colours

Näsets SK is a Swedish football club located in Västra Frölunda.

== Background ==
Näsets SK currently plays in Division 4 Göteborg B which is the sixth tier of Swedish football. They play their home matches at the Åkeredsvallen in Västra Frölunda.

The club is affiliated to Göteborgs Fotbollförbund. Näsets SK have competed in the Svenska Cupen on 4 occasions and have played 7 matches in the competition.

== Season to season ==
Season	Level	Division	Section	Position	Movements
1996	Tier 5	Division 4	Göteborg B	10th	
1997	Tier 5	Division 4	Göteborg B	8th	
1998	Tier 5	Division 4	Göteborg B	1st	Promoted
1999	Tier 4	Division 3	Nordvästra Götaland	12th	Relegated
2000	Tier 5	Division 4	Göteborg B	5th	
2001	Tier 5	Division 4	Göteborg B	7th	
2002	Tier 5	Division 4	Göteborg B	11th	Relegated
2003	Tier 6	Division 5	Göteborg B	8th	
2004	Tier 6	Division 5	Göteborg B	4th	
2005	Tier 6	Division 5	Göteborg B	5th	
2006*	Tier 7	Division 5	Göteborg B	10th	
2007	Tier 7	Division 5	Göteborg B	7th	
2008	Tier 7	Division 5	Göteborg B	1st	Promoted
2009	Tier 6	Division 4	Göteborg B	11th	Relegated
2010	Tier 7	Division 5	Göteborg B	2nd	Promoted
2011	Tier 6	Division 4	Göteborg B	2nd	

* League restructuring in 2006 resulted in a new division being created at Tier 3 and subsequent divisions dropping a level.
