= Tiina Salmén =

Finnish footballer (born 1984)

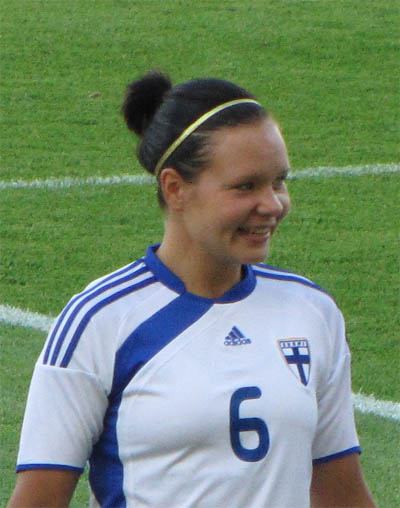

Personal information
- Full name: Tiina Sofia Salmén
- Date of birth: 3 August 1984 (age 42)
- Place of birth: Finland
- Position: Midfielder

Senior career*
Years	Team	Apps	(Gls)
- HJK Helsinki
2006–2010	Amazon Grimstad		
2011	Klepp IL	19	(1)

International career
2004–2011	Finland	77	(4)
- * Club domestic league appearances and goals

Tiina Sofia Salmén (born 3 August 1984) is a Finnish former football midfielder, who last played for Klepp IL in Norway's Toppserien. She previously played for HJK Helsinki in Finland's Naisten Liiga and Amazon Grimstad in the Toppserien.

As a member of the Finnish national team, she took part in the 2005 and 2009 European Championships. In 2007, she was named Finnish Women's Player of the Year.

After the 2011 Toppserien season, Salmén and compatriot Miia Niemi both left Klepp and retired from football.
