= Soile Malm =

Finnish association football player

Personal information
- Date of birth: 29 August 1957 (age 69)
- Position: Midfielder

International career
Years	Team	Apps	(Gls)
1974-1979	Finland	16	(1)

Soile Malm (born 29 August 1957) is a retired Finnish footballer who played for Into Kemi and the Finnish women's national team.

== Career ==
Whilst playing for Into Kemi, Malm won two Finnish championships and the Finnish Women's Cup. Malm won 16 caps for the Finnish national team between 1974 and 1979, scoring one goal. Malm had the honour of scoring the first goal for the national team and she scored the winning goal against Sweden on 12 June 1976.

== Honours ==
=== Into Kemi ===
- 2 Finnish Leagues
- 1 Finnish Cup
