= Marisa Brunner =

Swiss footballer (born 1982)

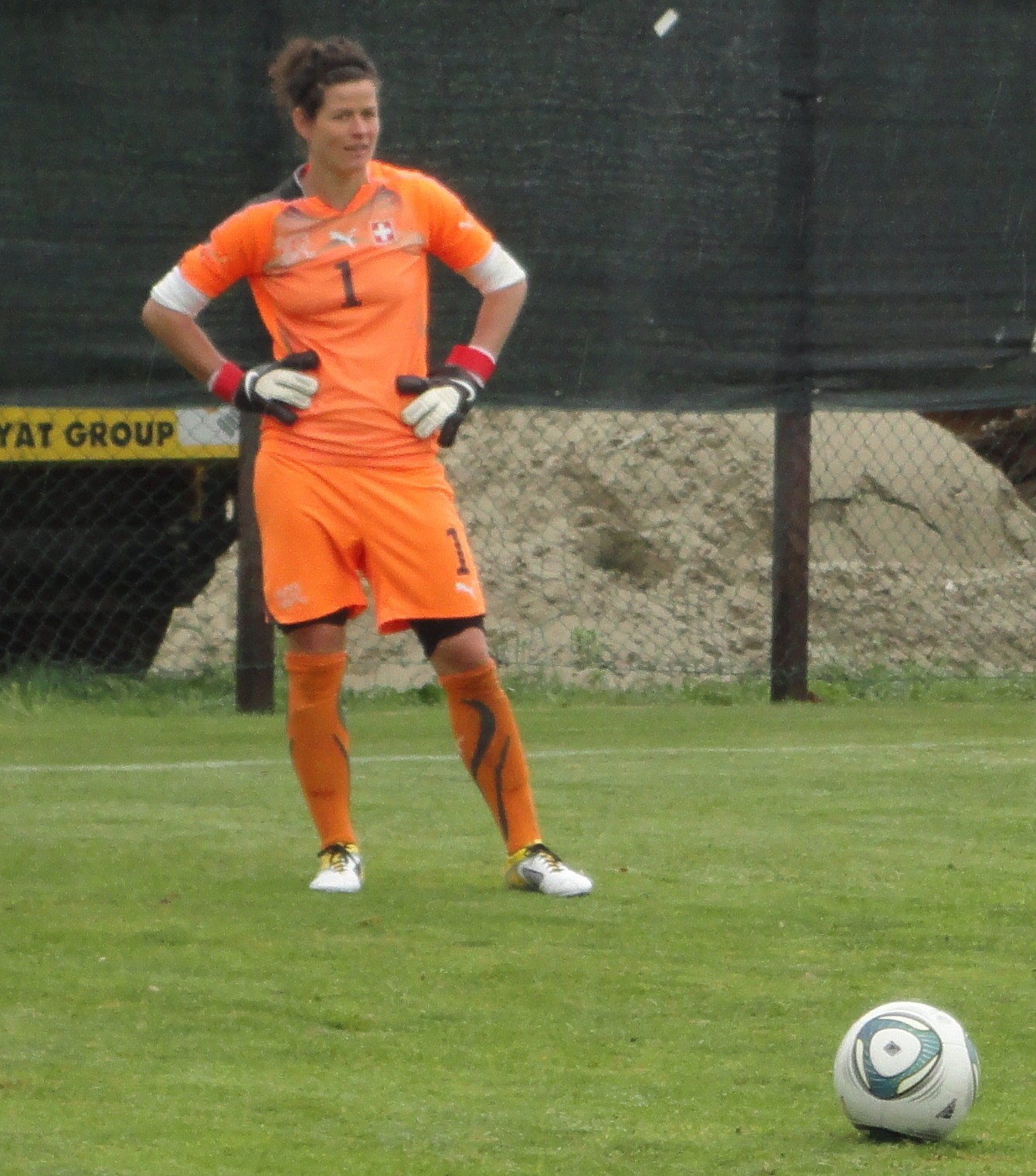

Personal information
- Full name: Marisa Brunner
- Date of birth: 28 May 1982 (age 44)
- Place of birth: Aarau, Switzerland
- Height: 1.76 m (5 ft 9 in)
- Position: Goalkeeper

Senior career*
Years	Team	Apps	(Gls)
1998–2001	FC Aarau		
2001–2006	FC Luzern Frauen		
2006–2012	SC Freiburg	91	(0)
2012–2013	SC Sand	5	(0)

International career
2003–2012	Switzerland	75	(0)
- * Club domestic league appearances and goals

Marisa Brunner is a retired Swiss football goalkeeper, who spent six years of her career playing for SC Freiburg in Germany's Bundesliga before moving to SC Sand where she in 2013 ended her playing career. Previous to her time in Germany she played for Swiss sides FC Aarau and SC LUwin.ch and was named the best Swiss player in 2007 and 2009.

She was the first-choice goalkeeper of the Swiss national team, for which she started to play in 2003.

== Titles ==
- Swiss league: 5 (2002–06)
- Swiss cup: 4 (2002, 2004–06)
