= Aire Lepik =

Estonian footballer

Aire Lepik is an Estonian footballer.

Club career: Viljandi JK Tulevik.

She has played for Estonia women's national football team.

In 1994 and 1995, she was chosen to Estonian Female Footballer of the Year.
