= Merja Sjöman =

Finnish association football player

Personal information
- Date of birth: 26 July 1955 (age 71)
- Position: Defender

International career
Years	Team	Apps	(Gls)
1973-1985	Finland	41	

Merja Sjöman (born 26 July 1955) is a retired Finnish footballer who played for Turun Palloseura and the Finnish women's national team.

== International career ==
Sjöman represented Finland 41 times between 1973 and 1985.

== Honours ==
Turun Palloseura

- Finnish League: 1978
