= Soile Ojala =

Finnish association football player

Personal information
- Date of birth: 5 November 1963 (age 62)
- Place of birth: Hämeenlinna, Finland
- Position: Midfielder

International career
Years	Team	Apps	(Gls)
1985-1991	Finland	59	

Soile Ojala (born 5 November 1963) is a retired Finnish footballer who played for Hammarby IF and the Finnish women's national team. She represented Finland 59 times.

Since retiring Ojala has worked in the financial sector for Sonera.
