= Referee (futsal) =

A referee controls matches in the sport of futsal, a variant of association football.

== Refereeing ==
In high level matches, there are two on-field referees and an off-field official (similar to a fourth official in outdoor football). In matches of lower level, there may be fewer officials, with one or two on-field officials.
