= Annika Tammela =

Estonian footballer

Personal information
- Date of birth: 1 July 1979
- Place of birth: Pärnu, then part of Estonian SSR, Soviet Union
- Date of death: 26 June 2001 (aged 21)
- Place of death: Pärnu, Estonia
- Position: Midfielder

International career^{‡}
Years	Team	Apps	(Gls)
1994–2000	Estonia	27	(1)
- ‡ National team caps and goals as of 23 June 2010

Annika Tammela (1 July 1979 – 26 June 2001) was an Estonian women's footballer. She was a member of the Estonia women's national football team from 1994 to 2000, playing 27 matches and scoring 1 goal. She became the Estonian Women's Footballer of the Year in 1999.

Tammela died, aged 21, died when her bicycle collided with a garbage truck that pulled out in front of her at the intersection of Tallinna Road and Rohu Street in Pärnu.
