= Susanna Heikari =

Finnish footballer (born 1977)

Personal information
- Full name: Susanna Heikari
- Date of birth: 8 April 1977 (age 49)
- Place of birth: Salo, Finland
- Height: 5 ft 5 in (1.65 m)
- Position: Midfielder

College career
Years	Team	Apps	(Gls)
1999	Portland Pilots		

Senior career*
Years	Team	Apps	(Gls)
1994–1996	Tikkurila		
1997	MPS		
1998–2009	HJK		
2010–2011	Zürich		

International career
1994–2002	Finland	44	(8)
- * Club domestic league appearances and goals

Susanna Heikari (born 8 April 1977) is a Finnish former football midfielder. She played for FC Tikkurila, MPS and HJK in the Naisten Liiga, Portland Pilots in the NCAA and FC Zürich in the Swiss Nationalliiga, taking part in the Champions League with HJK and Zürich.

Nicknamed Suski, she was a member of the Finnish national team for eight years.
