= Elis Meetua =

Estonian footballer

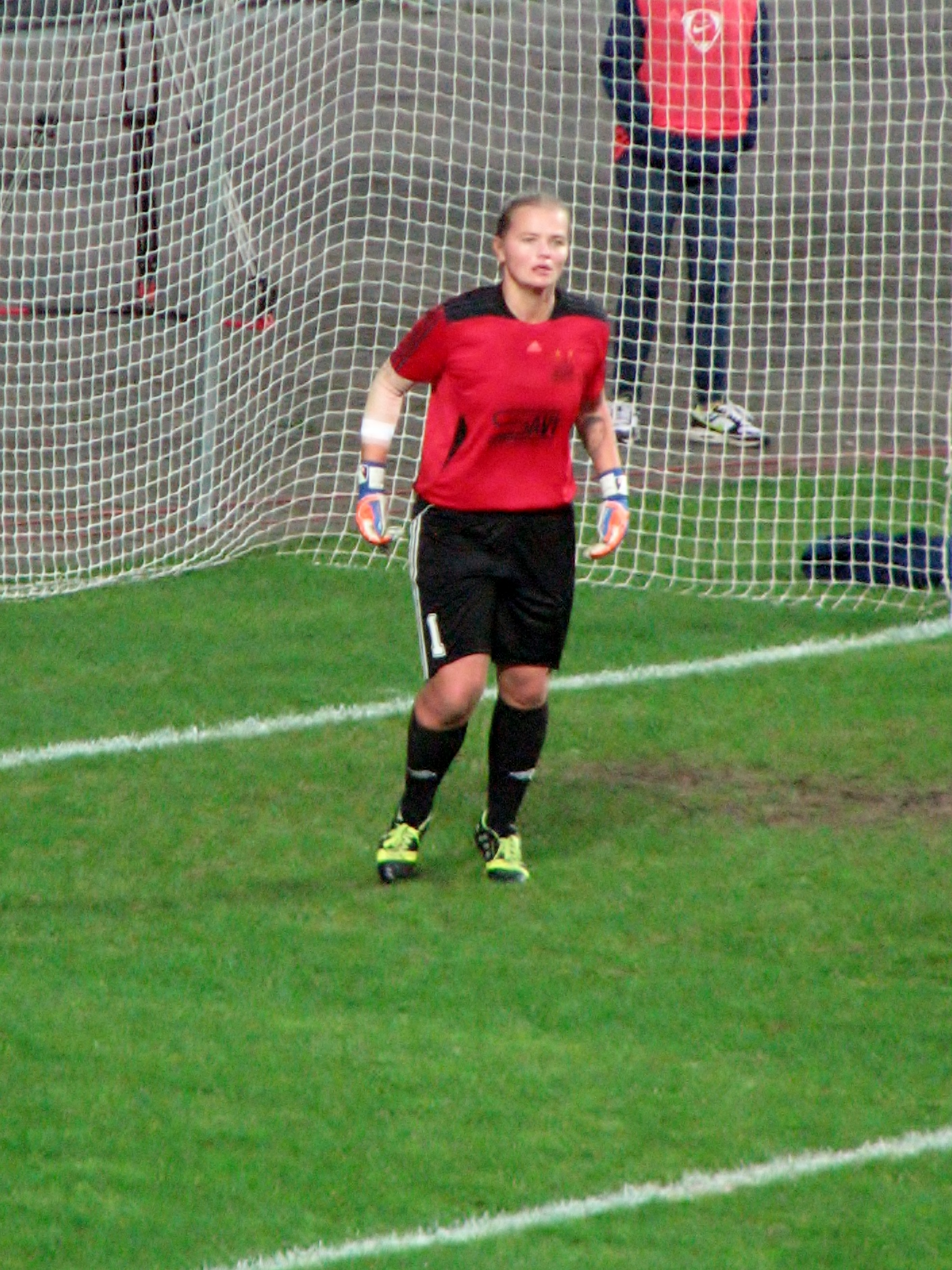

Personal information
- Full name: Elis Meetua
- Date of birth: 20 June 1979 (age 47)
- Position: Goalkeeper

Senior career*
Years	Team	Apps	(Gls)
- Pärnu

International career
1995–2011	Estonia	63	(0)
- * Club domestic league appearances and goals

Elis Meetua is an Estonian football goalkeeper currently playing in the Meistriliiga for Pärnu JK, with whom she has also played the Champions League. She was a member of the Estonian national team 1995–2011.
