= Sonja Stettler Spinner =

Swiss footballer (born 1969)

Personal information
- Date of birth: 24 August 1959 (age 67)
- Place of birth: Winterthur, Switzerland
- Position: Midfielder

International career
Years	Team	Apps	(Gls)
1984–1998	Switzerland	51	(13)

Sonja Stettler Spinner (born 18 July 1969) is a retired Swiss footballer who played for FC Blue Stars Zürich.
