= Maria Filatova (footballer) =

Estonian footballer

Maria Filatova (born 27 December 1980) is an Estonian footballer.

She was born in Tallinn.

Club career:

- Arsenal-90 (1995–1996)
- TKSK Arsenal (1996–1998)
- TKSK (1999–2000)
- TKSK Visa (2001–2005)
- FC Levadia (2006–2008).

1999-2006 she played for Estonia women's national football team.

In 2001 she was chosen to Estonian Female Footballer of the Year.
