= Olga Matīsa =

Latvian footballer

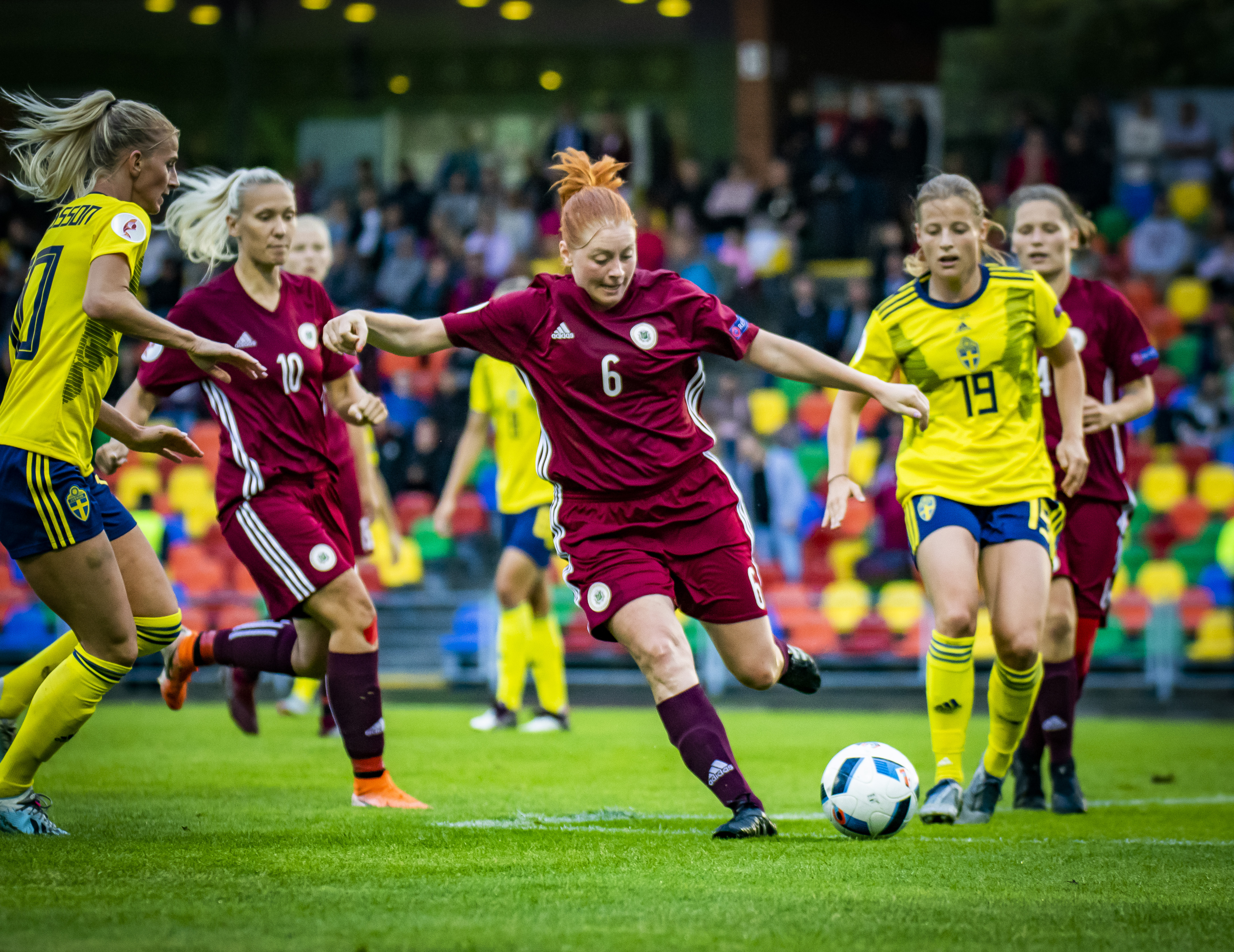

Personal information
- Date of birth: 15 July 1986 (age 40)
- Position: Defender

Team information
- Current team: SK Super Nova

Senior career*
Years	Team	Apps	(Gls)
2011 - 2013	Skonto / Cerība		
2013	FK Olaine		
2014-2022	Rīgas Futbola skola		
2022-	SK Super Nova		
2003-2004	Latvia U19	6	(0)
2011-	Latvia	35	(1)
- * Club domestic league appearances and goals as of 12:45, 20 July 2023 (UTC) ‡ National team caps and goals as of 12:45, 10 July 2023 (UTC)

Olga Matīsa (born 15 July 1986) is a Latvian footballer who plays as a midfielder for Sieviešu Futbola Līga club Rīgas FS and the Latvia women's national team.
