= Anne Mäkinen =

Finnish footballer (born 1976)

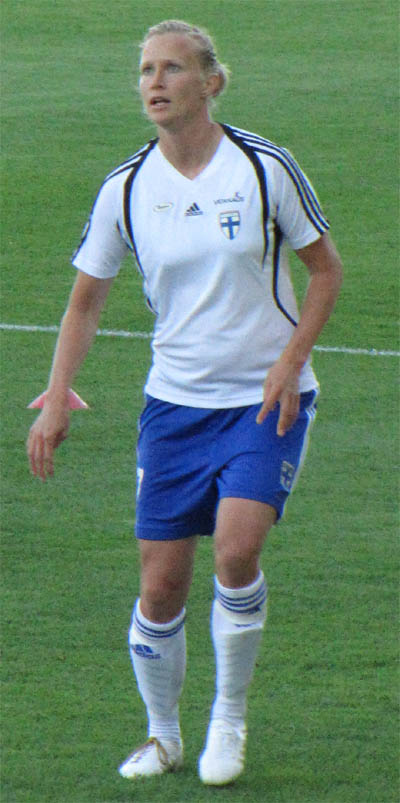

Personal information
- Full name: Anne Maarit Mäkinen
- Date of birth: 1 February 1976 (age 50)
- Place of birth: Helsinki, Finland
- Height: 5 ft 9 in (1.75 m)
- Position: Midfielder

Youth career
- JNK Laajasalo

College career
Years	Team	Apps	(Gls)
1997–2000	Notre Dame Fighting Irish	90	(65)

Senior career*
Years	Team	Apps	(Gls)
- KontU
- HJK
- MPS
2001–2002	Washington Freedom	30	(2)
2003	Philadelphia Charge	17	(0)
2004	New Jersey Wildcats	13	(5)
2005–2006	Umeå IK		
2007	Bälinge IF		
2008–2009	AIK		

International career^{‡}
1991–2009	Finland	118	(16)

Managerial career
- 2019–2022: AIK (sporting director)
- * Club domestic league appearances and goals as of 12:00, 25 March 2011 (UTC) ‡ National team caps and goals as of 20:00, 23 October 2011 (UTC)

Anne Maarit Mäkinen (born 1 February 1976) is a Finnish football manager and former footballer making 118 appearances for the Finland national team. During her career she played as a central midfielder.

== Career ==
Mäkinen was the first Finnish player to play in the WUSA, and played collegiately at the University of Notre Dame. Mäkinen played for Washington Freedom, Philadelphia Charge and New Jersey Wildcats. While with Notre Dame, she was the Rookie of the Year in 1997 and the most valuable player in 2000, and was selected to the All Stars of university soccer four years in a row. In December 2004, Mäkinen joined Swedish Umeå IK. With Umeå IK, she twice won the Swedish top league, Damallsvenskan, in 2005 and 2006. Mäkinen then played for Bälinge IF and AIK.

Following her debut in June 1991, Mäkinen represented Finland a record 118 times, with 16 goals as of her retirement in 2009. In 2005, Mäkinen vice-captained Finland to the bronze medals in the European Championship finals, which stands as her nations's best achievement in this sport. She was awarded the Golden Player award for best player of the tournament.

Mäkinen's playing style was very powerful. She was skillful with the ball, and dictated the run of her team's play from central midfield with her effective tackling and telling passes.

Mäkinen's soccer jersey number was retired in 2011 at the IMG Soccer Academy where she trained in her early years, often competing against male players for a challenge.

In 2017, Mäkinen was appointed physio coach of Finland women's national team. Mäkinen was appointed sports director for her former club as active, AIK, after the 2019 season. Before the 2021 season, her role was changed to manager. In May 2022, she was replaced as manager for AIK by Jesper Björk after six straight losses, including a Tvillingderbyt against Djurgården.
