= Laura Österberg Kalmari =

Finnish footballer (born 1979)

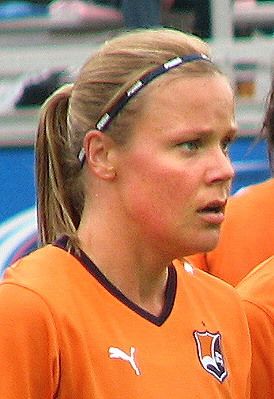
- Laura Österberg Kalmari

Personal information
- Full name: Laura Elina Österberg Kalmari
- Birth name: Laura Elina Kalmari
- Date of birth: 27 May 1979 (age 47)
- Place of birth: Kirkkonummi, Finland
- Height: 5 ft 8 in (1.73 m)
- Position: Forward

Youth career
- 1984–1995: KyIF

College career
Years	Team	Apps	(Gls)
2000	Portland Pilots		

Senior career*
Years	Team	Apps	(Gls)
1995–1996	PuiU		
1997	MPS		
1998–1999	HJK		
2000–2001	HJK		
2002	Boston Renegades		
2003–2004	Umeå IK		
2005–2006	Djurgården/Älvsjö		
2007–2009	AIK		
2010–2011	Sky Blue FC	33	(7)

International career
1996–2011	Finland	130	(41)
- * Club domestic league appearances and goals

Laura Elina Österberg Kalmari (née Kalmari; born 27 May 1979) is a Finnish former professional footballer. Immediately prior to her retirement in early 2012, she had been playing as a forward for American Women's Professional Soccer (WPS) team Sky Blue FC. She is the Finland women's national football team's third most capped player.

== Club career ==
Österberg Kalmari played in Finnish clubs Puistolan Urheilijat, Malmin Palloseura and HJK before moving to the University of Portland in 2000. Kalmari returned to HJK to play in the inaugural UEFA Women's Cup in 2001–2002. HJK reached the semi-finals, and then she moved back to the United States to play with Boston Renegades in the W-League. In 2002, she moved to Swedish Damallsvenskan club Umeå IK, where she won the UEFA Women's Cup two years in succession. Österberg Kalmari also played for Djurgården/Älvsjö in 2005 and 2006, before moving to AIK in 2007.

With Women's Professional Soccer (WPS) team Sky Blue FC Österberg Kalmari scored seven goals in 33 appearances across the 2010 and 2011 seasons. After the failure of the professional league in America, Österberg Kalmari announced her retirement from playing in April 2012.

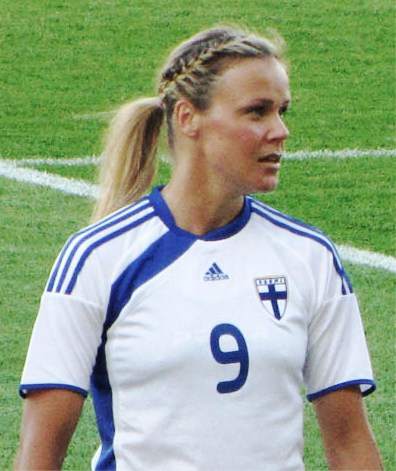
Österberg Kalmari playing for the Finland national team.

== International career ==
Following her senior debut in March 1996, Österberg Kalmari represented the Finland women's national football team 130 times, scoring 41 goals. She is the all-time leading goalscorer of the national team. In 2005, Österberg Kalmari played in the finals of the 2005 European Championships in North West England. Finland reached the semi-finals, which remains her nation's best achievement in women's football.

After a break from international football which included the birth of her daughter, Österberg Kalmari was recalled to the national team in January 2009 having last played in September 2006. She went on to represent hosts Finland in the 2009 European Championships, where they reached the quarter-finals.

Österberg Kalmari is a five-time winner of the Women's Finnish Footballer of the Year—more times than any other player. She collected the award in 1999, 2003, 2006, 2009 and 2010.

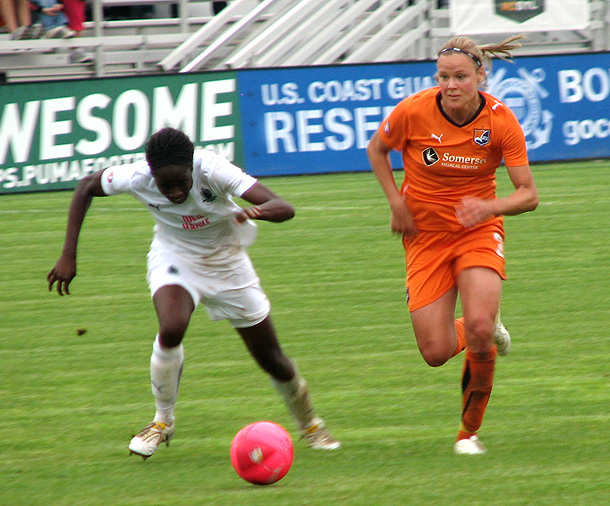
Österberg Kalmari (R) playing for NJ Sky Blue against St.Louis Athletica, 2010

== Personal life ==
Österberg Kalmari married Niko Österberg in 2007. Their daughter Meja was born in March 2008.
