= Inna Kiss-Zlidnis =

Estonian footballer

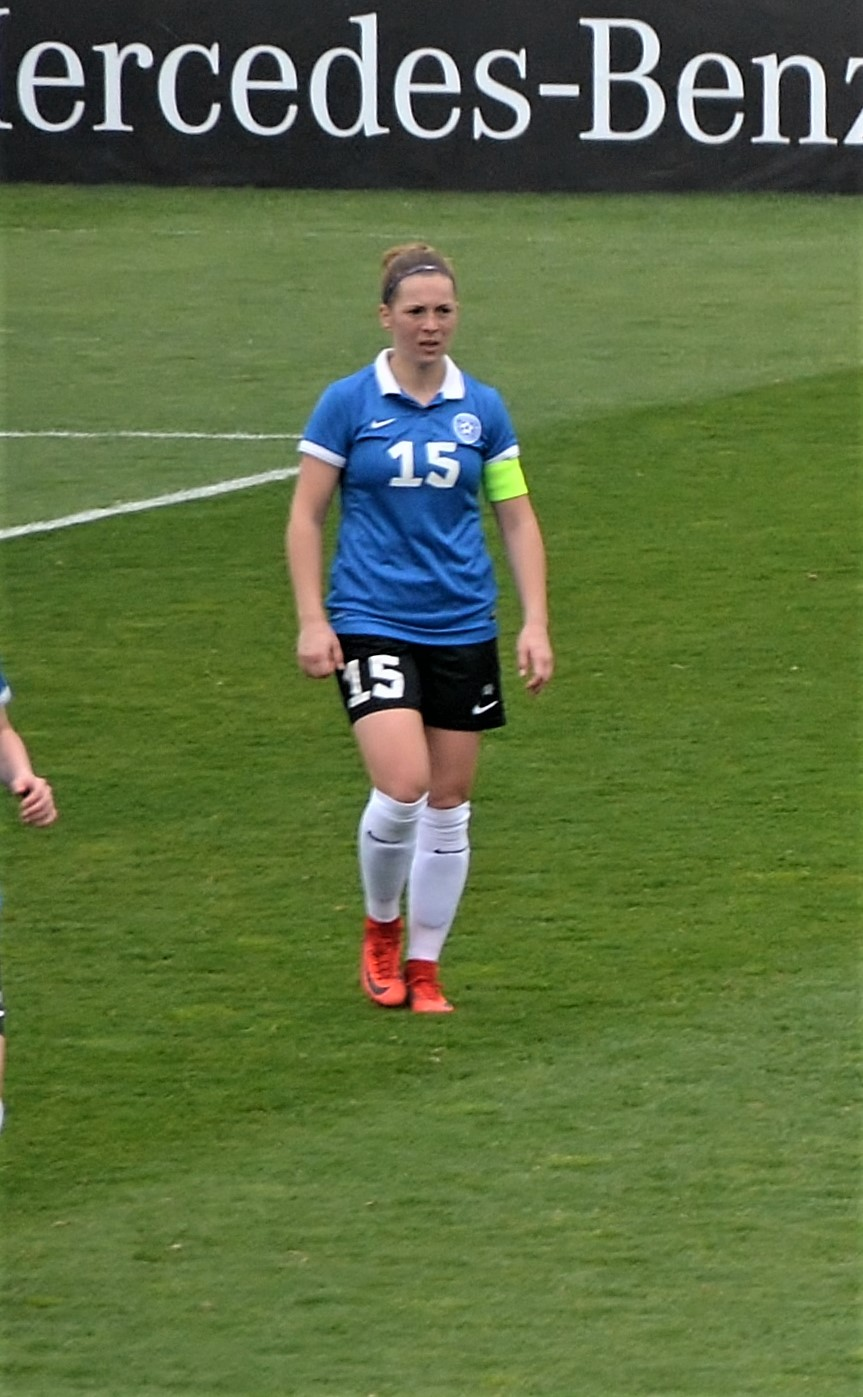
- Kiss-Zlidnis playing for Estonia in 2018

Personal information
- Full name: Inna Kiss-Zlidnis
- Date of birth: 18 April 1990 (age 36)
- Height: 1.66 m (5 ft 5 in)
- Position: Left-back

Team information
- Current team: Ferencváros
- Number: 24

Senior career*
Years	Team	Apps	(Gls)
2004–2006	TKSK Visa		
2006–2013	Levadia Tallinn		
2014	Blau-Weiß Hohen Neuendorf		
2014–2023	Ferencváros		
2024-	Budafoki		

International career^{‡}
2007–	Estonia	105	(0)
- * Club domestic league appearances and goals ‡ National team caps and goals as of 1 October 2025

Inna Kiss-Zlidnis (born Inna Zlidnis; 18 April 1990) is an Estonian professional footballer who plays as a left-back for captains the Estonia women's national team. On 29 November 2024, she made her 100th appearance.
