= Getter Laar =

Estonian footballer

Personal information
- Full name: Getter Laar
- Date of birth: 21 November 1989 (age 36)
- Place of birth: Pärnu, then part of Estonian SSR, Soviet Union
- Height: 1.79 m (5 ft 10 in)
- Position: Goalkeeper

Youth career
- 2003–2005: Pärnu

Senior career*
Years	Team	Apps	(Gls)
2007–2009	Pärnu II	34	(6)
2006–2009	Pärnu	29	(0)
2009–2010	Tallinna Kalev	26	(0)
2011–2013	Flora II	3	(0)
2011–2013	Flora	40	(0)
2013–2014	Guingamp	14	(0)
2014–2018	Metz	45	(0)
2021	Flora	6	(0)

International career
2007–2018	Estonia	50	(0)
- * Club domestic league appearances and goals

Getter Laar (born 21 November 1989) is an Estonian retired footballer who played as a goalkeeper.

== Club career ==
In January 2011 Laar spent time training with Chelsea of the English FA WSL, playing in a friendly against Watford. She had ambitions to move abroad but wanted to finish her university education first. She secured a transfer to French Division 1 Féminine club Guingamp in summer 2013, through the contacts of Estonian national coach Keith Boanas. In 2013 Laar was named Estonia's female Player of the Year.
