= Puistolan Urheilijat =

Finnish sports club

- Nickname: PuiU
- Founded: 1929; 97 years ago
- Ground: Puistolan liikuntapuisto, Helsinki, Finland
- League: Kolmonen
- 2026: Kakkonen Group A, 9th of 10 (relegated)
Home colours

Puistolan Urheilijat (abbreviated PuiU) is a sports club from Helsinki, Finland specialising in football, badminton, tennis, volleyball, bowling and fitness. The club was formed in 1929 and currently has 1,400 members. The men's football first team currently plays in the Kolmonen (Third Division) and its home ground is at the Puistolan liikuntapuisto.

== Background ==
PuiU was established in 1929 and has spent many seasons in the lower divisions of the Finnish football league. The club has achieved one season in the third tier, the Kakkonen (Second Division,) in 2007 but their stay was short-lived as they were relegated at the end of the campaign.

The club is proud to have gained the Nuori Suomi -sinetti (Young Finland Seal) which recognises the quality of its youth work. In Women's Football the club participated in the Naisten Liiga from 2007 until 2009 when they were relegated following a relegation play-off with Vasaan Sport.

The most famous youngster to progress from the club's youth system is Petri Oravainen who has subsequently gained international honours. In Women's Football Laura Österberg Kalmari and Minna Mustonen are other notable internationals who started with PuiU.

== Season to season ==
Season to season of PuiU

Season	Level	Division	Section	Administration	Position	Movements
1983	Tier 6	5. Divisioona (Fifth Division)	Group 2	Helsinki District (SPL Helsinki)		
1984	Tier 6	5. Divisioona (Fifth Division)	Group 1	Helsinki District (SPL Helsinki)		
1985	Tier 6	5. Divisioona (Fifth Division)		Helsinki District (SPL Helsinki)	4th	
1986	Tier 6	5. Divisioona (Fifth Division)		Helsinki District (SPL Helsinki)	4th	
1987						
1988						
1989						
1990						
1991	Tier 5	4. Divisioona (Fourth Division)	Group 2	Helsinki & Uusimaa (SPL Helsinki)	2nd	Promotion Playoff
1992	Tier 5	4. Divisioona (Fourth Division)	Group 3	Helsinki & Uusimaa (SPL Helsinki)	6th	
1993	Tier 5	Nelonen (Fourth Division)	Group 1	Helsinki & Uusimaa (SPL Helsinki)	5th	
1994	Tier 5	Nelonen (Fourth Division)	Group 2	Helsinki & Uusimaa (SPL Helsinki)	6th	
1995	Tier 5	Nelonen (Fourth Division)	Group 1	Helsinki & Uusimaa (SPL Helsinki)	7th	
1996	Tier 5	Nelonen (Fourth Division)	Group 1	Helsinki & Uusimaa (SPL Helsinki)	2nd	Promotion Playoff
1997	Tier 5	Nelonen (Fourth Division)	Group 3	Helsinki & Uusimaa (SPL Helsinki)	3rd	
1998	Tier 5	Nelonen (Fourth Division)	Group 1	Helsinki & Uusimaa (SPL Helsinki)		
1999	Tier 5	Nelonen (Fourth Division)	Group 3	Helsinki & Uusimaa (SPL Helsinki)	3rd	Promoted
2000	Tier 4	Kolmonen (Third Division)	Section 1	Helsinki & Uusimaa (SPL Helsinki)	7th	
2001	Tier 4	Kolmonen (Third Division)	Section 1	Helsinki & Uusimaa (SPL Uusimaa)	8th	
2002	Tier 4	Kolmonen (Third Division)	Section 2	Helsinki & Uusimaa (SPL Uusimaa)	10th	
2003	Tier 4	Kolmonen (Third Division)	Section 2	Helsinki & Uusimaa (SPL Uusimaa)	4th	
2004	Tier 4	Kolmonen (Third Division)	Section 2	Helsinki & Uusimaa (SPL Uusimaa)	5th	
2005	Tier 4	Kolmonen (Third Division)	Section 3	Helsinki & Uusimaa (SPL Helsinki)	3rd	
2006	Tier 4	Kolmonen (Third Division)	Section 3	Helsinki & Uusimaa (SPL Helsinki)	1st	Promoted
2007	Tier 3	Kakkonen (Second Division)	Group A	Finnish FA (Suomen Pallolitto)	12th	Relegated
2008	Tier 4	Kolmonen (Third Division)	Section 3	Helsinki & Uusimaa (SPL Helsinki)	10th	
2009	Tier 4	Kolmonen (Third Division)	Section 1	Helsinki & Uusimaa (SPL Uusimaa)	8th	
2010	Tier 4	Kolmonen (Third Division)	Section 3	Helsinki & Uusimaa (SPL Uusimaa)	6th	
2011	Tier 4	Kolmonen (Third Division)	Section 1	Helsinki & Uusimaa (SPL Helsinki)	8th	
2012	Tier 4	Kolmonen (Third Division)	Section 3	Helsinki & Uusimaa (SPL Helsinki)	7th	
2013	Tier 4	Kolmonen (Third Division)	Section 1	Helsinki & Uusimaa (SPL Helsinki)	9th	
2014	Tier 4	Kolmonen (Third Division)	Section 3	Helsinki & Uusimaa (SPL Uusimaa)	9th	
2015	Tier 4	Kolmonen (Third Division)	Section 3	Helsinki & Uusimaa (SPL Uusimaa)	4th	
2016	Tier 4	Kolmonen (Third Division)	Section 3	Helsinki & Uusimaa (SPL Uusimaa)	9th	
2017	Tier 4	Kolmonen (Third Division)	Section 3	Helsinki & Uusimaa (SPL Uusimaa)	8th	
2018	Tier 4	Kolmonen (Third Division)	Section 1	Helsinki & Uusimaa (SPL Uusimaa)	5th	
2019	Tier 4	Kolmonen (Third Division)	Section 2	Helsinki & Uusimaa (SPL Uusimaa)	10th	
2020	Tier 4	Kolmonen (Third Division)	Lohko B	Miesten Kolmonen Etelä	11th / 18th	
2021	Tier 4	Kolmonen (Third Division)	Lohko B	Miesten Kolmonen Etelä	8th	
2022	Tier 4	Kolmonen (Third Division)	Lohko B	Miesten Kolmonen Etelä	6th	
2023	Tier 4	Kolmonen (Third Division)	Lohko C	Miesten Kolmonen Etelä	4th	
2024	Tier 5	Kolmonen (Third Division)	Lohko C	Miesten Kolmonen Etelä	1st	Promoted
2025	Tier 4	Kakkonen (Second Division)	Group A	Finnish FA (Suomen Pallolitto)		

- 1 season in Kakkonen
- 24 seasons in Kolmonen

== Club Structure ==
Puistolan Urheilijat run a large number of teams including 3 men's teams, 2 ladies teams, 10 boys teams and 7 girls teams.

== 2010 season ==
PuiU Men's Team are competing in Section 3 (Lohko 3) of the Kolmonen administered by the Uusimaa SPL. This is the fourth highest tier in the Finnish football system. In 2009 PuiU finished in 8th place in Section 1 (Lohko 1) of the Kolmonen.

PuiU / 86 are competing in Section 2 (Lohko 2) of the Seiska (Seventh Division) administered by the Helsinki SPL.

== References and Sources ==
- Official Website
- Finnish Wikipedia
- Suomen Cup
- PuiU Miehet 86 Facebook
