= Malmin Palloseura =

Finnish football club

- Full name: Malmin Palloseura
- Nickname: mapsi or ämpsi
- Founded: 1948; 78 years ago
- Ground: Tapanila, Helsinki, Finland
- Chairman: Jyrki Saulo
- Manager: Sami Koskinen
- League: Kolmonen
Home colours	Away colours

Malmin Palloseura (abbreviated as MPS) is a Helsinki-based football club that was formed in Malmi, Helsinki in 1948. The club's first team has been playing mostly in the Second and Third Divisions. Currently the team plays in the Kakkonen which is the third tier of the Finnish football system. MPS plays its home games at Siltamäki, Tapuli, Tapanila and Pukinmäki sports parks.

== Background ==
MPS (often known as "mapsi" or "ämpsi") is widely appreciated for their good work in developing junior football. Currently, the best known youngsters that have come through the club's ranks are Vesa Vasara (FC Honka), John Kangas (FC Honka), Roope Heilala (FC Honka) and Mika Kottila (MPS).

MPS are one of Helsinki's biggest football clubs and the junior section has enjoyed great prestige. Each year new teams are formed and the membership is constantly growing. A key priority for MPS is the development of youth and junior football education . Youngsters are then able to progress to the adult male and female teams.

An interesting development has been the progress of Atletico Malmi who since 2007 have achieved 3 consecutive promotions moving from the Kutonen (Sixth Division) to the Kolmonen (Third Division) to now play at the same level as the club's first team.

MPS is affiliated to the Helsinki District Association of the Football Association of Finland. In 2003 it was the District Association's Club of the Year and in 1998 won the Fair Play Award.

== Season to season ==
=== First team ===
Season to Season

Season	Level	Division	Section	Administration	Position	Movements
1948	Tier 3	Suomensarjan karsinnat	Cup format	Finnish FA & TUL(Suomen Pallolitto & Työväen Urheiluliitto)	2nd round	Qualifier for Suomensarja, qualified from TUL leagues
1949	Tier 3	Suomensarjan karsinnat	Cup format	Finnish FA & TUL(Suomen Pallolitto & Työväen Urheiluliitto)	2nd round	Qualifier for Suomensarja, qualified from TUL leagues
1950	Tier 3	Suomensarjan karsinnat	East Group	Finnish FA & TUL(Suomen Pallolitto & Työväen Urheiluliitto)	8th	Qualification for Suomensarja, qualified from TUL leagues
1951	Tier 3	Suomensarjan karsinnat	West Group	Finnish FA & TUL(Suomen Pallolitto & Työväen Urheiluliitto)	7th	Qualification for Suomensarja, qualified from TUL leagues
1952	Tier 3	Suomensarjan karsinnat	East Group	Finnish FA & TUL(Suomen Pallolitto & Työväen Urheiluliitto)	6th	Qualification for Suomensarja, qualified from TUL leagues
1953	Tier 4	Piirinsarja (District Leagues)		Helsinki & Uusimaa (SPL Helsinki)		
1954	Tier 3	Maakuntasarja (Third Division)	West Group IV	Finnish FA (Suomen Pallolitto)	11th	Relegated
1955	Tier 4	Piirinsarja (District Leagues)		Helsinki & Uusimaa (SPL Helsinki)		Promotion Playoff
1956	Tier 4	Aluesarja (Fourth Division)	Group 1 Helsinki & Central Uusimaa	Finnish FA (Suomen Pallolitto)	4th	
1957	Tier 4	Aluesarja (Fourth Division)	Group 3 Helsinki & Central Uusimaa	Finnish FA (Suomen Pallolitto)	3rd	
1958	Tier 4	Aluesarja (Fourth Division)	Group 2 Helsinki	Finnish FA (Suomen Pallolitto)	3rd	
1959	Tier 4	Aluesarja (Fourth Division)	Group 2 Helsinki	Finnish FA (Suomen Pallolitto)	1st	Promoted
1960	Tier 3	Maakuntasarja (Third Division)	Group 1 Helsinki & Uusimaa	Finnish FA (Suomen Pallolitto)	3rd	
1961	Tier 3	Maakuntasarja (Third Division)	Group 1 Helsinki & Uusimaa	Finnish FA (Suomen Pallolitto)	1st	Promoted
1962	Tier 2	Suomensarja (First Division)	East Group	Finnish FA (Suomen Palloliitto)	9th	
1963	Tier 2	Suomensarja (First Division)	East Group	Finnish FA (Suomen Palloliitto)	12th	Relegated
1964	Tier 3	Maakuntasarja (Third Division)	Group 1 Helsinki & Uusimaa	Finnish FA (Suomen Pallolitto)	2nd	
1965	Tier 3	Maakuntasarja (Third Division)	Group 1 Helsinki & Uusimaa	Finnish FA (Suomen Pallolitto)	5th	
1966	Tier 3	Maakuntasarja (Third Division)	Group 1 Helsinki	Finnish FA (Suomen Pallolitto)	5th	
1967	Tier 3	Maakuntasarja (Third Division)	Group 1 Helsinki & Uusimaa	Finnish FA (Suomen Pallolitto)	9th	Relegated
1968	Tier 4	Aluesarja (Fourth Division)	Group 2	Helsinki & Central Uusimaa (SPL Helsinki)	1st	Promotion Playoff
1969	Tier 4	Aluesarja (Fourth Division)	Group 2	Helsinki & Uusimaa (SPL Helsinki)	4th	
1970	Tier 4	IV Divisioona (Fourth Division)	Group 2	Helsinki & Uusimaa (SPL Helsinki)	2nd	
1971	Tier 4	IV Divisioona (Fourth Division)	Group 1	Helsinki & Uusimaa (SPL Helsinki)	6th	
1972	Tier 4	IV Divisioona (Fourth Division)	Group 2	Helsinki & Uusimaa (SPL Helsinki)	7th	
1973	Tier 5	IV Divisioona (Fourth Division)	Group 1	Helsinki & Uusimaa(SPL Helsinki)	8th	Relegation Playoff
1974	Tier 5	IV Divisioona (Fourth Division)	Group 2	Helsinki & Uusimaa(SPL Helsinki)	4th	
1975	Tier 5	IV Divisioona (Fourth Division)	Group 1	Helsinki & Uusimaa(SPL Helsinki)	3rd	
1976	Tier 5	IV Divisioona (Fourth Division)	Group 1	Helsinki & Uusimaa(SPL Helsinki)	2nd	
1977	Tier 5	IV Divisioona (Fourth Division)	Group 2	Helsinki & Uusimaa(SPL Helsinki)	4th	
1978	Tier 5	IV Divisioona (Fourth Division)	Group 2	Helsinki & Uusimaa(SPL Helsinki)	2nd	Promotion Playoff
1979	Tier 5	IV Divisioona (Fourth Division)	Group 3	Helsinki & Uusimaa(SPL Helsinki)	1st	Promotion Playoff - Promoted
1980	Tier 4	III Divisioona (Third Division)	Group 1	Helsinki & Uusimaa (SPL Helsinki)	8th	
1981	Tier 4	III Divisioona (Third Division)	Group 1	Helsinki & Uusimaa (SPL Helsinki)	9th	
1982	Tier 4	III Divisioona (Third Division)	Group 2	Helsinki & Uusimaa (SPL Helsinki)	11th	Relegated
1983	Tier 5	IV Divisioona (Fourth Division)	Group 2	Helsinki & Uusimaa(SPL Helsinki)	1st	Promotion Playoff - Promoted
1984	Tier 4	III Divisioona (Third Division)	Group 2	Helsinki & Uusimaa (SPL Helsinki)	6th	
1985	Tier 4	III Divisioona (Third Division)	Group 1	Helsinki & Uusimaa (SPL Helsinki)	8th	
1986	Tier 4	III Divisioona (Third Division)	Group 1	Helsinki & Uusimaa (SPL Helsinki)	2nd	
1987	Tier 4	III Divisioona (Third Division)	Group 1	Helsinki & Uusimaa (SPL Helsinki)	7th	
1988	Tier 4	III Divisioona (Third Division)	Group 1	Helsinki & Uusimaa (SPL Helsinki)	4th	
1989	Tier 4	III Divisioona (Third Division)	Group 2	Helsinki & Uusimaa (SPL Helsinki)	8th	
1990	Tier 4	III Divisioona (Third Division)	Group 1	Helsinki & Uusimaa (SPL Helsinki)	7th	
1991	Tier 4	III Divisioona (Third Division)	Group 1	Helsinki & Uusimaa (SPL Helsinki)	2nd	
1992	Tier 4	III Divisioona (Third Division)	Group 1	Helsinki & Uusimaa (SPL Helsinki)	2nd	Promoted
1993	Tier 3	Kakkonen (Second Division)	East Group	Finnish FA (Suomen Pallolitto)	10th	
1994	Tier 3	Kakkonen (Second Division)	South Group	Finnish FA (Suomen Pallolitto)	8th	
1995	Tier 3	Kakkonen (Second Division)	East Group	Finnish FA (Suomen Pallolitto)	8th	
1996	Tier 3	Kakkonen (Second Division)	South Group	Finnish FA (Suomen Pallolitto)	10th	Relegated
1997	Tier 4	Kolmonen (Third Division)	Group 2	Helsinki & Uusimaa (SPL Helsinki)	1st	Promoted
1998	Tier 3	Kakkonen (Second Division)	South Group	Finnish FA (Suomen Pallolitto)	6th	
1999	Tier 3	Kakkonen (Second Division)	South Group	Finnish FA (Suomen Pallolitto)	11th	Relegated
2000	Tier 4	Kolmonen (Third Division)	Section 1	Helsinki & Uusimaa (SPL Helsinki)	1st	Promoted
2001	Tier 3	Kakkonen (Second Division)	South Group	Finnish FA (Suomen Pallolitto)	11th	Relegated
2002	Tier 4	Kolmonen (Third Division)	Section 3	Helsinki & Uusimaa (SPL Helsinki)	8th	
2003	Tier 4	Kolmonen (Third Division)	Section 3	Helsinki & Uusimaa (SPL Helsinki)	5th	
2004	Tier 4	Kolmonen (Third Division)	Section 3	Helsinki & Uusimaa (SPL Helsinki)	3rd	
2005	Tier 4	Kolmonen (Third Division)	Section 3	Helsinki & Uusimaa (SPL Helsinki)	1st	Play-off Group A – Promoted
2006	Tier 3	Kakkonen (Second Division)	Group A	Finnish FA (Suomen Pallolitto)	10th	
2007	Tier 3	Kakkonen (Second Division)	Group A	Finnish FA (Suomen Pallolitto)	13th	Relegated
2008	Tier 4	Kolmonen (Third Division)	Section 2	Helsinki & Uusimaa (SPL Helsinki)	3rd	
2009	Tier 4	Kolmonen (Third Division)	Section 2	Helsinki & Uusimaa (SPL Helsinki)	2nd	
2010	Tier 4	Kolmonen (Third Division)	Section 2	Helsinki & Uusimaa (SPL Helsinki)	1st	Promoted
2011	Tier 3	Kakkonen (Second Division)	Group A	Finnish FA (Suomen Pallolitto)	13th	Relegated
2012	Tier 4	Kolmonen (Third Division)	Section 1	Helsinki & Uusimaa (SPL Uusimaa)	3rd	
2013	Tier 4	Kolmonen (Third Division)	Section 1	Helsinki & Uusimaa (SPL Helsinki)	5th	
2014	Tier 4	Kolmonen (Third Division)	Section 2	Helsinki & Uusimaa (SPL Helsinki)	3rd	
2015	Tier 4	Kolmonen (Third Division)	Group 3	Helsinki & Uusimaa (SPL Helsinki)	1st	Promoted
2016	Tier 3	Kakkonen (Second Division)	Group A	Finnish FA (Suomen Pallolitto)	12th	Relegated
2017	Tier 4	Kolmonen (Third Division)	Group 3	Helsinki & Uusimaa (SPL Helsinki)	11th	Relegated - Team folded Atletico Malmi continues as a first team

- 2 seasons in Ykkönen
- 18 seasons in Kakkonen
- 37 seasons in Kolmonen
- 8 seasons in Nelonen

=== Atletico Malmi ===
Season	Level	Division	Section	Administration	Position	Movements
2003	Tier 8	Seiska (Seventh Division)	Section 2	Helsinki District (SPL Helsinki)	11th	
2004	Tier 8	Seiska (Seventh Division)	Section 2	Helsinki District (SPL Helsinki)	2nd	Promoted
2005	Tier 7	Kutonen (Sixth Division)	Section 4	Helsinki District (SPL Helsinki)	9th	
2006	Tier 7	Kutonen (Sixth Division)	Section 1	Helsinki District (SPL Helsinki)	10th	
2007	Tier 7	Kutonen (Sixth Division)	Section 2	Helsinki District (SPL Helsinki)	1st	Promoted
2008	Tier 6	Vitonen (Fifth Division)	Section 3	Helsinki District (SPL Helsinki)	2nd	Promoted
2009	Tier 5	Nelonen (Fourth Division)	Section 2	Helsinki District (SPL Helsinki)	2nd	Promoted
2010	Tier 4	Kolmonen (Third Division)	Section 1	Helsinki & Uusimaa (SPL Uusimaa)	11th	Relegated

- 1 season in Kolmonen
- 1 season in Nelonen
- 1 season in Vitonen
- 3 seasons in Kutonen
- 2 seasons in Seiska

== Club Structure ==
MPS currently has 6 men's team, 2 ladies teams, 3 veteran's teams, 13 boys teams and 7 girls team.

== 2010 season ==
For the current season MPS are running 6 Men's teams;

MPS's First Team are competing in Section 2 (Lohko 2) of the Kolmonen administered by the Helsinki SPL.

MPS /Atletico Malmi are competing in Section 1 (Lohko 1) of the Kolmonen administered by the Uusimaa SPL.

MPS/2 and MPS/Old Stars are participating in the Nelonen, MPS 4 in the Kutonen and MPS / Atletico Akatemia in the Seiska – all administered by the Helsinki SPL.

== References and sources ==
- Official Malmin Palloseura Website
- Atletico Malmi Website
- Finnish Wikipedia
- Suomen Cup
- Atletico Malmi Facebook
