= Finnish Women's Cup =

Naisten Suomen Cup
- Founded: 1981
- Region: Finland
- Teams: 30 (2015)
- Current champions: HJK Helsinki (2024)
- Most championships: HJK Helsinki (18 titles)
- Website: Official site (in Finnish)

The Finnish Women's Cup (Finnish: Naisten Suomen Cup, Swedish: Finlands cup för damer) is the national women's football cup competition in Finland and was first played in 1981.

== List of finals ==
The list of finals:

Year	Winner	Runner-up	Result	Venue	Attendance
1981	HJK Helsinki	Kemin Into	0–0 (a.e.t.), 4–3 (p)	Töölön pallokenttä, Helsinki	265
1982	Kemin Into	Turun Pyrkivä	2–1	Kupittaan jalkapallostadion, Turku	
1983	Puotinkylän Valtti	Koparit	4–1	Olympiastadion Helsinki	800
1984	HJK Helsinki	Kemin Into	2–0	Olympiastadion, Helsinki	500
1985	HJK Helsinki	Puotinkylän Valtti	3–0	Olympiastadion, Helsinki	500
1986	HJK Helsinki	Herttoniemen Toverit	3–0	Olympiastadion, Helsinki	300
1987	Herttoniemen Toverit	Turun Pyrkivä	5–1	Olympiastadion, Helsinki	1000
1988	Herttoniemen Toverit	HJK Helsinki	2–1	Olympiastadion, Helsinki	733
1989	Herttoniemen Toverit	PP-Futis	1–0	Olympiastadion, Helsinki	800
1990	Helsinki United	Kontulan Urheilijat	3–2	Olympiastadion, Helsinki	520
1991	HJK Helsinki	FC Ilves	2–2 (a.e.t.), 3–2 (p)	Olympiastadion, Helsinki	500
1992	HJK Helsinki	Kontulan Urheilijat	2–1 (a.e.t.)	Olympiastadion, Helsinki	521
1993	HJK Helsinki	Kontulan Urheilijat	4–0	Leppävaaran urheilupuisto, Espoo	288
1994	Turun Pyrkivä	HJK Helsinki	2–0	Turku	250
1995	Kontulan Urheilijat	Tikkurilan Palloseura	3–0	Olympiastadion, Helsinki	1381
1996	Puistolan Urheilijat	HJK Helsinki	2–1	Leppävaaran urheilupuisto, Espoo	
1997	Malmin Palloseura	FC Ilves	3–1 (a.e.t.)	Töölön pallokenttä, Helsinki	200
1998	HJK Helsinki	Malmin Palloseura	3–1	Töölön pallokenttä, Helsinki	250
1999	HJK Helsinki	FC United	3–1	Tammelan stadion, Tampere	
2000	HJK Helsinki	FC United	3–0	Myyrmäen jalkapallostadion, Vantaa	442
2001	FC United	HJK Helsinki	2–1	Talin jalkapallohalli, Helsinki	161
2002	HJK Helsinki	FC United	3–0	Myyrmäen jalkapallostadion, Vantaa	384
2003	Malmin Palloseura	HJK Helsinki	1–0	Töölön jalkapallostadion, Helsinki	
2004	FC United	HJK Helsinki	1–0	Töölön jalkapallostadion, Helsinki	510
2005	FC United	FC Espoo	1–0	Töölön jalkapallostadion, Helsinki	442
2006	HJK Helsinki	FC United	3–0	Töölön jalkapallostadion, Helsinki	886
2007	HJK Helsinki	FC Honka	3–1 (a.e.t.)	Töölön jalkapallostadion, Helsinki	365
2008	HJK Helsinki	FC Kuusysi	3–1	Töölön jalkapallostadion, Helsinki	370
2009	FC Honka	HJK Helsinki	1–0	Töölön jalkapallostadion, Helsinki	
2010	HJK Helsinki	FC Ilves	2–1	Töölön jalkapallostadion, Helsinki	437
2011	PK-35 Vantaa	FC Ilves	2–0	Töölön jalkapallostadion, Helsinki	419
2012	PK-35 Vantaa	Pallokissat	2–1	Töölön jalkapallostadion, Helsinki	358
2013	PK-35 Vantaa	HJK Helsinki	2–0	Töölön jalkapallostadion, Helsinki	391
2014	FC Honka	FC Ilves	2–1 (a.e.t.)	Töölön jalkapallostadion, Helsinki	1439
2015	FC Honka	HJK Helsinki	4–3	Töölön jalkapallostadion, Helsinki	1822
2016	PK-35 Vantaa	FC Honka	2–0	Harjun stadion, Jyväskylä	
2017	HJK Helsinki	PK-35 Vantaa	1–0	Myyrmäen jalkapallostadion, Vantaa	250
2019	HJK Helsinki	Åland United	1–0	Töölön jalkapallostadion, Helsinki	686
2020	Åland United	TiPS	2–1	Myyrmäki Stadium	525
2021	Åland United	PK-35	1–1 (a.e.t.), 4–2 (p)	Olympiastadium, Helsinki	506
2022	Åland United	HJK Helsinki	2–0	Olympiastadium, Helsinki	1291
2023	Kuopion PS	HJK Helsinki	5–0	Olympiastadium, Helsinki	1382
2024	HJK Helsinki	FC Honka	2–1	Tammelan Stadion Tampere	712

== See also ==
- Finnish Cup, men's edition
