= Helsingin Jalkapalloklubi (women) =

Kansallinen Liiga team in Helsinki

HJK
- Full name: Helsingin Jalkapalloklubi Naiset
- Founded: 1971
- Ground: Bolt Arena; Töölö, Helsinki, Finland
- Capacity: 10,600
- Chairman: Pentti Markkanen
- Manager: Arttu Heinonen
- League: Kansallinen Liiga
- 2025: Champions
- Website: http://www.hjk.fi/naiset
Home colours	Away colours

Helsingin Jalkapalloklubi, commonly known as HJK and internationally known as HJK Helsinki, is a Finnish women's football team representing HJK Helsinki in the Kansallinen Liiga.

HJK is the championship's most successful team by a large margin, having won 25 titles between 1971 (its founding year) and 2025. The team enjoyed their best winning streak between 1995 and 2001. HJK reached the semifinals of the inaugural edition of the UEFA Women's Cup, their best result in three appearances in the competition.

In the subsequent six years from 2005 it has failed to win the championship, finishing either 2nd, 3rd or 4th. However, it has been more successful in the national Cup, including three titles in a row between 2006 and 2008.

== Honours ==
=== Official ===
- 25 Finnish Leagues (1971, 1972, 1973, 1974, 1975, 1979, 1980, 1981, 1984, 1986, 1987, 1988, 1991, 1992, 1995, 1996, 1997, 1998, 1999, 2000, 2001, 2005, 2019, 2024, 2025
- 18 Finnish Cups (1981, 1984, 1985, 1986, 1991, 1992, 1993, 1998, 1999, 2000, 2002, 2006, 2007, 2008, 2010, 2017, 2019, 2024)

=== Invitational ===
- 2 Menton Tournaments (1987, 1988)

=== Record in UEFA competitions ===
Season	Competition	Stage	Result	Opponent
2001–02	UEFA Women's Cup	Group Stage	2–1	(Italy) Torres
			4–0	(Faroe Islands) KÍ
			8–0	(Austria) Landhaus Wien
		Quarterfinals	1–2 2–0	(Norway) Trondheims-Ørn
		Semifinals	1–2 0–1	(Sweden) Umeå
2002–03	UEFA Women's Cup	Group Stage	2–0	(Poland) Wrocław
			8–0	(Wales) Bangor City
			0–0	(Switzerland) Sursee
		Quarterfinals	0–2 0–10	(Germany) Frankfurt
2006–07	UEFA Women's Cup	Qualifying Stage	2–0	(Switzerland) Zuchwil
			1–0	(Poland) Wrocław
			7–0	(North Macedonia) Skiponjat
		Group Stage	1–2	(Iceland) Breiðablik
			0–0	(Belarus) Universitet Vitebsk
			0–2	(Germany) Frankfurt

== Current squad ==
As of 5 August 2026. Note: Flags indicate national team as defined under FIFA eligibility rules; some limited exceptions apply. Players may hold more than one non-FIFA nationality.

No.	Pos.	Nation	Player
1	GK	FIN	Helmi Vihervuori
2	DF	FIN	Noora Karvonen
3	DF	FIN	Anelma Lahikainen
4	DF	FIN	Ulrika Sarelius
5	DF	FIN	Juulia Grönlund
7	FW	FIN	Amanda Rantanen
8	MF	FIN	Reetta Suomela
9	FW	FIN	Kerttu Sarelius
10	MF	FIN	Jenna Topra
11	FW	FIN	Nora Heroum
12	GK	FIN	Annika Laihanen
13	MF	FIN	Minea Lassas
15	MF	FIN	Alma Forstén
16	MF	FIN	Juulia Sarkki

No.	Pos.	Nation	Player
17	FW	FIN	Iiris Holmström
18	FW	FIN	Isabella Ylätalo
19	FW	FIN	Sara Sievistö
23	MF	FIN	Elli-Noora Kainulainen
24	MF	FIN	Sofia Eranka
25	GK	FIN	Siiri Forsström
27	MF	FIN	Milja Kiviranta
28	MF	FIN	Aada Mandelin
30	MF	USA	Lacee Bethea
31	MF	FIN	Rebecca Viljamaa
34	DF	FIN	Laura Hillberg
44	DF	USA	Jenna Tivnan
51	DF	FIN	Maaria Roth
71	MF	JPN	Miho Kamogawa

=== Former internationals ===
- (Finland) Susanna Heikari
- (Finland) Laura Kalmari
- (Finland) Annika Kukkonen
- (New Zealand) Maureen Jacobson
- (Finland) Anne Mäkinen
- (Finland) Pauliina Miettinen
- (Finland) Essi Sainio
- (Finland) Tiina Salmén
- (England) Marieanne Spacey
- (Finland) Sanna Talonen
- (England) Louise Waller
