= Finnish Footballer of the Year =

Sports award

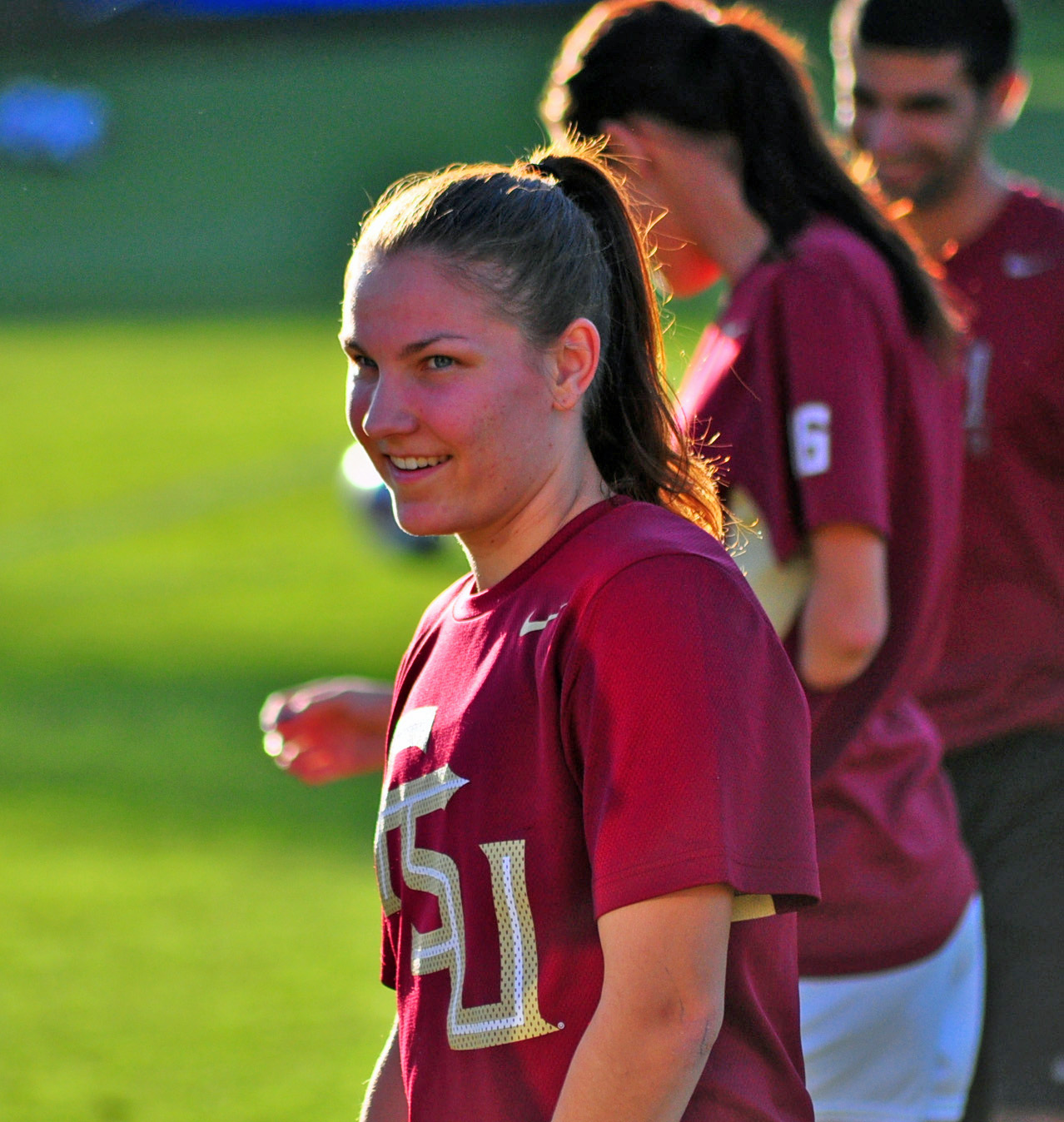
Natalia Kuikka

There are three different Finnish Player of the Year Awards in Finland. The sports journalists have elected their male "Player of the Year" since 1947, the Football Association of Finland theirs since 1953. In 1976 the FA began selecting a female "Player of the Year".

== Finnish Footballer of the Year ==
(Finland) FINNISH FOOTBALLER OF THE YEAR (Finland)
YEAR	SPORTS JOURNALISTS	FOOTBALL ASSOCIATION
1947	Leo Turunen	—
1948	Thure Sarnola	—
1949	Aulis Rytkönen	—
1950	Aulis Rytkönen	—
1951	Kalevi Lehtovirta	—
1952	Aulis Rytkönen	—
1953	Mauno Rintanen	Mauno Rintanen
1954	Matti Hiltunen	Pekka Kupiainen
1955	Matti Jokinen	Matti Jokinen
1956	Lauri Lehtinen	Lauri Lehtinen
1957	Alpo Lintamo	Alpo Lintamo
1958	Kai Pahlman	Kai Pahlman
1959	Unto Nevalainen	Unto Nevalainen
1960	Juhani Peltonen	Juhani Peltonen
1961	Olli Heinonen	Olli Heinonen
1962	Juhani Peltonen	Juhani Peltonen
1963	Olli Heinonen	Olli Heinonen
1964	Juhani Peltonen	Juhani Peltonen
1965	Juhani Peltonen	Lars Näsman
1966	Matti Mäkelä	Pertti Mäkipää
1967	Lars Näsman	Timo Kautonen
1968	Timo Nummelin	Jouni Jalonen
1969	Seppo Kilponen	Tommy Lindholm
1970	Timo Kautonen	Timo Kautonen
1971	Arto Tolsa	Arto Tolsa
1972	Miikka Toivola	Miikka Toivola
1973	Jouko Suomalainen	Jouko Suomalainen
1974	Arto Tolsa	Arto Tolsa
1975	Göran Enckelman	Göran Enckelman
1976	Aki Heiskanen	Ari Mäkynen
1977	Arto Tolsa	Arto Tolsa
1978	Atik Ismail	Miikka Toivola
1979	Seppo Pyykkö	Seppo Pyykkö
1980	Aki Lahtinen	Aki Lahtinen
1981	Juha Dahllund	Aki Lahtinen
1982	Pasi Rautiainen	Olli Huttunen
1983	Kari Ukkonen	Kari Ukkonen
1984	Olli Huttunen	Olli Huttunen
1985	Ismo Lius	Jukka Ikäläinen
1986	Esa Pekonen	Petri Tiainen
1987	Ari Hjelm	Ari Hjelm
1988	Mika-Matti Paatelainen	Mika-Matti Paatelainen
1989	Ari Heikkinen	Jari Europaeus
1990	Jari Litmanen	Jari Litmanen
1991	Marko Myyry	Marko Myyry
1992	Jari Litmanen	Jari Litmanen
1993	Jari Litmanen	Jari Litmanen
1994	Jari Litmanen	Jari Litmanen
1995	Jari Litmanen	Jari Litmanen
1996	Jari Litmanen	Jari Litmanen
1997	Jari Litmanen	Jari Litmanen
1998	Jari Litmanen	Jari Litmanen
1999	Sami Hyypiä	Sami Hyypiä
2000	Sami Hyypiä	Jari Litmanen
2001	Sami Hyypiä	Sami Hyypiä
2002	Sami Hyypiä	Sami Hyypiä
2003	Sami Hyypiä	Sami Hyypiä
2004	Antti Niemi	Antti Niemi
2005	Sami Hyypiä	Sami Hyypiä
2006	Sami Hyypiä	Sami Hyypiä
2007	Jussi Jääskeläinen	Jussi Jääskeläinen
2008	Petri Pasanen	Sami Hyypiä
2009	Sami Hyypiä	Sami Hyypiä
2010	Sami Hyypiä	Sami Hyypiä
2011	Roman Eremenko	Roman Eremenko
2012	Niklas Moisander	Niklas Moisander
2013	Niklas Moisander	Niklas Moisander
2014	Roman Eremenko	Roman Eremenko
2015	Roman Eremenko	Tim Sparv
2016	Lukas Hradecky	Lukas Hradecky
2017	Lukas Hradecky	Lukas Hradecky
2018	Lukas Hradecky	Lukas Hradecky
2019	Teemu Pukki	Teemu Pukki
2020	Lukas Hradecky	Teemu Pukki
2021	Lukas Hradecky	Lukas Hradecky
2022	Natalia Kuikka	Glen Kamara
2023	Lukas Hradecky	Lukas Hradecky
2024	Lukas Hradecky	Oliver Antman
2025	Oliver Antman	Lukas Hradecky

=== Women ===
(Finland) FINNISH FOOTBALLER OF THE YEAR (Finland)
YEAR	FOOTBALL ASSOCIATION
1976	Merja Sjöman
1977	Soile Malm
1978	Åsa Wennström
1979	Kirsi Koskela
1980	Merja Sjöman
1981	Tarja Konttila
1982	Anna-Maria Lehtonen
1983	Hanna-Mari Sarlin
1984	Tuula Sundman (later Tuula Okkola)
1985	Marianne Sulen
1986	Hanna-Mari Sarlin
1987	Anu Toikka
1988	Tiina Lehtola
1989	Soile Ojala
1990	Marja Aaltonen
1991	Susanna Kuosmanen
1992	Pauliina Auveri
1993	Anne Mäkinen
1994	Johanna Lindell
1995	Marianne Lindholm
1996	Hanna Ekström
1997	Kaisa Mustonen
1998	Hanna Ekström
1999	Laura Kalmari (later Laura Österberg Kalmari)
2000	Sani Ylitalo
2001	Sanna Valkonen
2002	Sanna Valkonen
2003	Laura Kalmari (later Laura Österberg Kalmari)
2004	Anne Mäkinen
2005	Satu Kunnas
2006	Laura Kalmari (later Laura Österberg Kalmari)
2007	Tiina Salmén
2008	Linda Sällström
2009	Laura Kalmari (later Laura Österberg Kalmari)
2010	Laura Kalmari (later Laura Österberg Kalmari)
2011	Linda Sällström
2012	Maija Saari
2013	Tinja-Riikka Korpela
2014	Tinja-Riikka Korpela
2015	Tinja-Riikka Korpela
2016	Tinja-Riikka Korpela
2017	Natalia Kuikka
2018	Anna Westerlund
2019	Linda Sällström
2020	Natalia Kuikka
2021	Natalia Kuikka
2022	Natalia Kuikka
2023	Natalia Kuikka
2024	Jutta Rantala
2025	Eveliina Summanen

== See also ==
- Finnish Sportspersonality of the year
- Finnish Football Manager of the Year
