= UEFA Euro 1980 qualifying Group 6 =

Football tournament qualification stage

Standings and results for Group 6 of the UEFA Euro 1980 qualifying tournament.

Group 6 consisted of Soviet Union, Hungary, Greece and Finland. This group proved to be one of the toughest as unexpected group winners Greece outran both Finland and Hungary by only one point and Soviet Union, who finished last, by two points.

== Final table ==
Pos	Team	Pld	W	D	L	GF	GA	GD	Pts	Qualification	(Greece)	(Hungary)	(Finland)	(Soviet Union)
1	Greece	6	3	1	2	13	7	+6	7	Qualify for final tournament	—	4–1	8–1	1–0
2	Hungary	6	2	2	2	9	9	0	6		0–0	—	3–1	2–0
3	Finland	6	2	2	2	10	15	−5	6		3–0	2–1	—	1–1
4	Soviet Union	6	1	3	2	7	8	−1	5		2–0	2–2	2–2	—

Source: UEFA
Rules for classification: Qualification tiebreakers

== Results ==
24 May 1978

Finland	3–0	Greece
Ismail 35', 82'; Nieminen 80'

Olympiastadion, Helsinki
Attendance: 7,740
Referee: Heinz Einbeck (GDR)

20 September 1978

Finland	2–1	Hungary
Ismail 30'; Pyykkö 53'		Tieber 74'

Olympiastadion, Helsinki
Attendance: 4,797
Referee: Erik Fredriksson (SWE)

20 September 1978

Soviet Union	2–0	Greece
Chesnokov 20'; Bezsonov 53'

Hrazdan Stadium, Yerevan
Attendance: 26,913
Referee: John Carpenter (IRL)

11 October 1978

Hungary	2–0	Soviet Union
Váradi 26'; Szokolai 60'

Népstadion, Budapest
Attendance: 23,110
Referee: Walter Eschweiler (FRG)

11 October 1978

Greece	8–1	Finland
Nikoloudis 15', 25'; Delikaris 23', 47'; Mavros 38', 44', 75' (pen.); Galakos 81'		Heiskanen 61'

Leoforos Alexandras Stadium, Athens
Attendance: 4,857
Referee: Marcel van Langenhove (BEL)

28 October 1978

Greece	4–1	Hungary
Galakos 58', 67'; Ardizoglou 71'; Mavros 89'		Váradi 90'

Kaftanzoglio Stadium, Thessaloniki
Attendance: 13,463
Referee: Nikola Milanov Doudine (BUL)

2 May 1979

Hungary	0–0	Greece

Népstadion, Budapest
Attendance: 15,028
Referee: Bartley John Homewood (ENG)

19 May 1979

Soviet Union	2–2	Hungary
Chesnokov 23'; Shengelia 75'		Tatar 33'; Pusztai 63'

Dinamo Stadium, Tbilisi
Attendance: 75,174
Referee: Brian R. McGinlay (SCO)

4 July 1979

Finland	1–1	Soviet Union
Ismail 55'		Khapsalis 28'

Olympiastadion, Helsinki
Attendance: 13,119
Referee: Ole Amundsen (DEN)

12 September 1979

Greece	1–0	Soviet Union
Nikoloudis 25'

Leoforos Alexandras Stadium, Athens
Attendance: 25,537
Referee: António José da Silva Garrido (POR)

17 October 1979

Hungary	3–1	Finland
Fekete 11', 42'; Tatar 57'		Toivola 47'

Oláh Gábor Stadium, Debrecen
Attendance: 7,977
Referee: Charles G.R. Corver (NED)

31 October 1979

Soviet Union	2–2	Finland
Andreyev 50'; Gavrilov 67'		Haaskivi 76'; Hakala 82'

Central Lenin Stadium, Moscow
Attendance: 1,090
Referee: Aleksandar Nikić (YUG)

== Goalscorers ==
There were 39 goals scored in 12 matches, for an average of 3.25 goals per match.

4 goals

- (Finland) Atik Ismail
- (Greece) Thomas Mavros

3 goals

- (Greece) Maik Galakos
- (Greece) Takis Nikoloudis

2 goals

- (Greece) Georgios Delikaris
- (Hungary) László Fekete
- (Hungary) György Tatár
- (Hungary) Béla Várady
- (Soviet Union) Yuri Chesnokov

1 goal

- (Finland) Kai Haaskivi
- (Finland) Tuomo Hakala
- (Finland) Aki Heiskanen
- (Finland) Jyrki Nieminen
- (Finland) Seppo Pyykkö
- (Finland) Miikka Toivola
- (Greece) Christos Ardizoglou
- (Hungary) László Pusztai
- (Hungary) László Szokolai
- (Hungary) László Tieber
- (Soviet Union) Sergey Andreyev
- (Soviet Union) Volodymyr Bezsonov
- (Soviet Union) Yuri Gavrilov
- (Soviet Union) Aleksandr Khapsalis
- (Soviet Union) Ramaz Shengelia
