= Finnish Football Hall of Fame =

Honorary gallery in Valkeakoski, Finland

The Finnish Football Hall of Fame is an honorary gallery which was established in 1993, and is located in the Football Museum of Finland (Finnish: Suomen Jalkapallomuseo) in Valkeakoski. Players, coaches, referees or other persons that are merited in developing the Finnish football are eligible to be named in the gallery.

The inductions are decided by a certain committee. The committee consists of representatives of the Football Association of Finland, Sports Museum of Finland, Football Museum of Finland and Pallo-Kopla, the association of Finnish sports journalists. A player is eligible to be named in the gallery after three years have passed since their playing career ended.

== Inductees ==
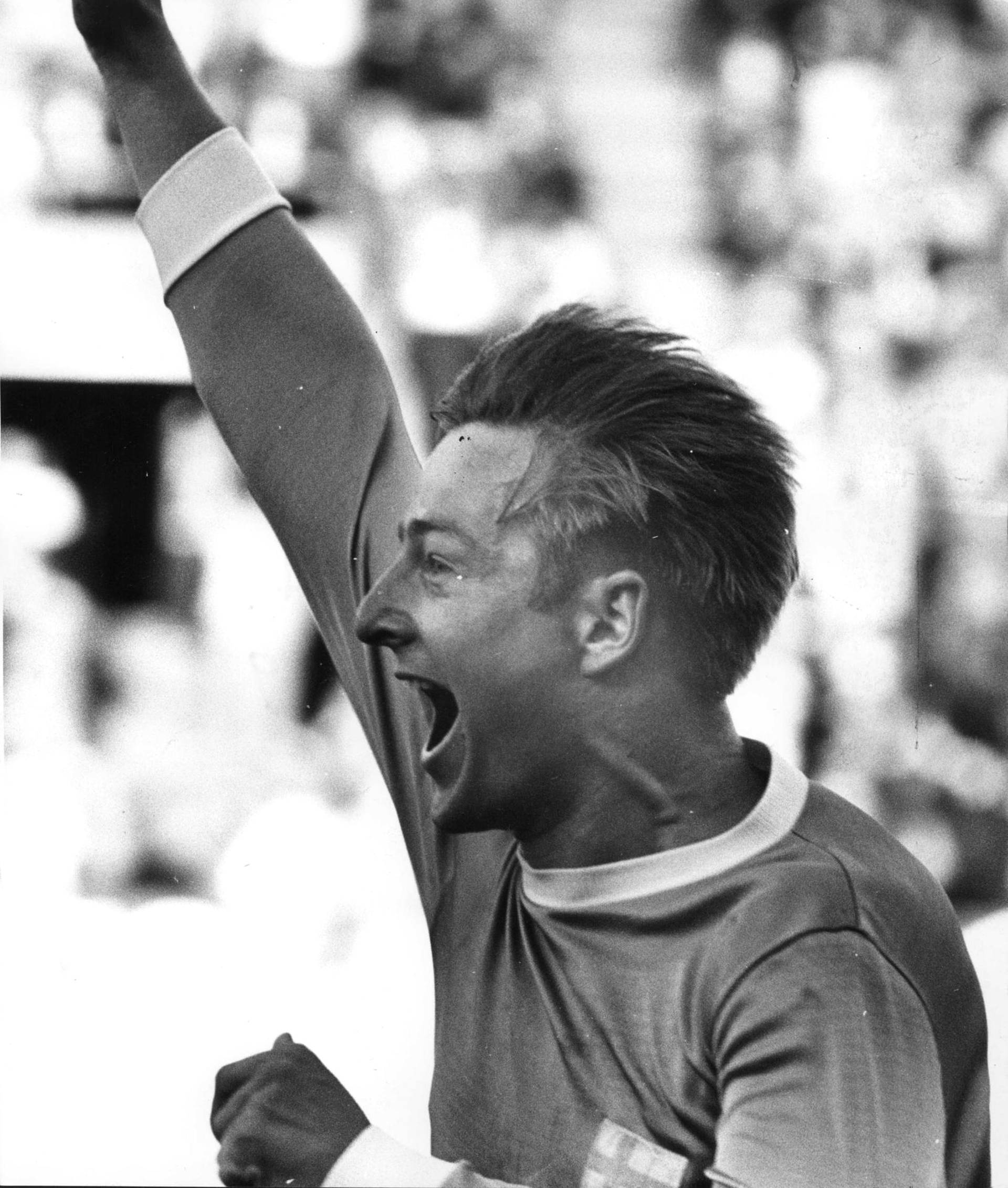
Former national team player Arto Tolsa was selected in 1993.

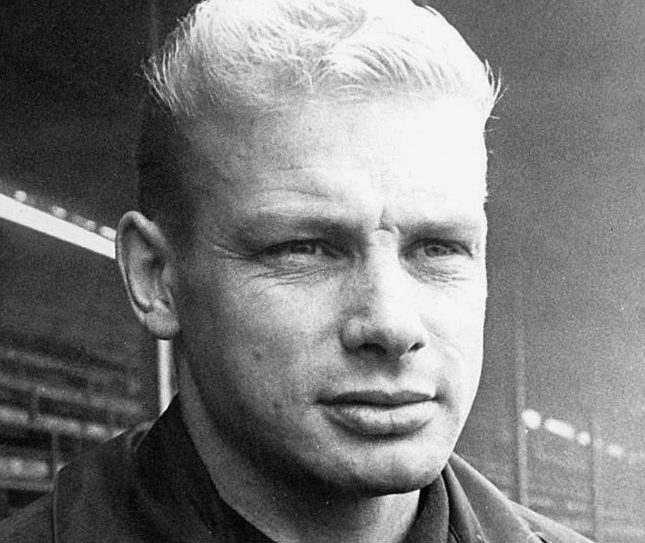
Juhani Peltonen was selected in 1994. Peltonen was the first Finnish player in Bundesliga.

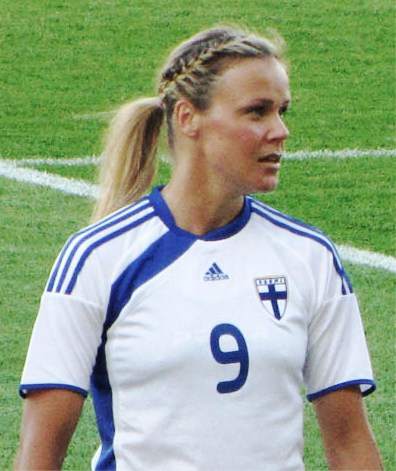
Former national team player Laura Österberg Kalmari was selected in 2014.

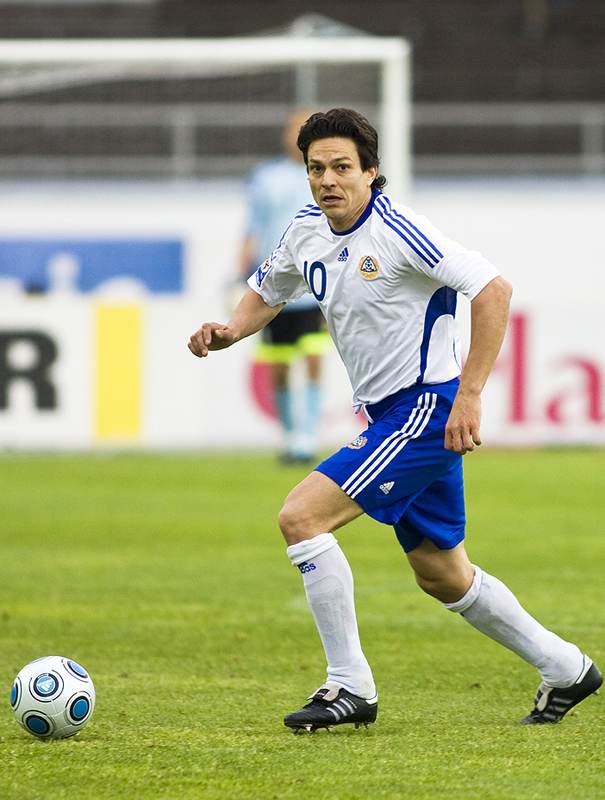
Jari Litmanen was selected in 2015.

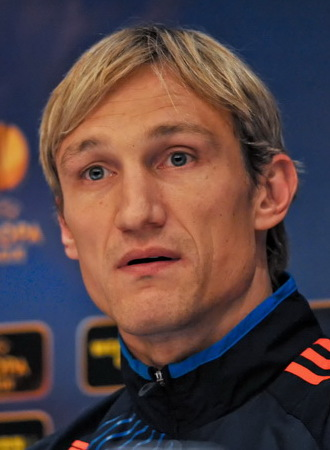
Sami Hyypiä was selected in 2015.

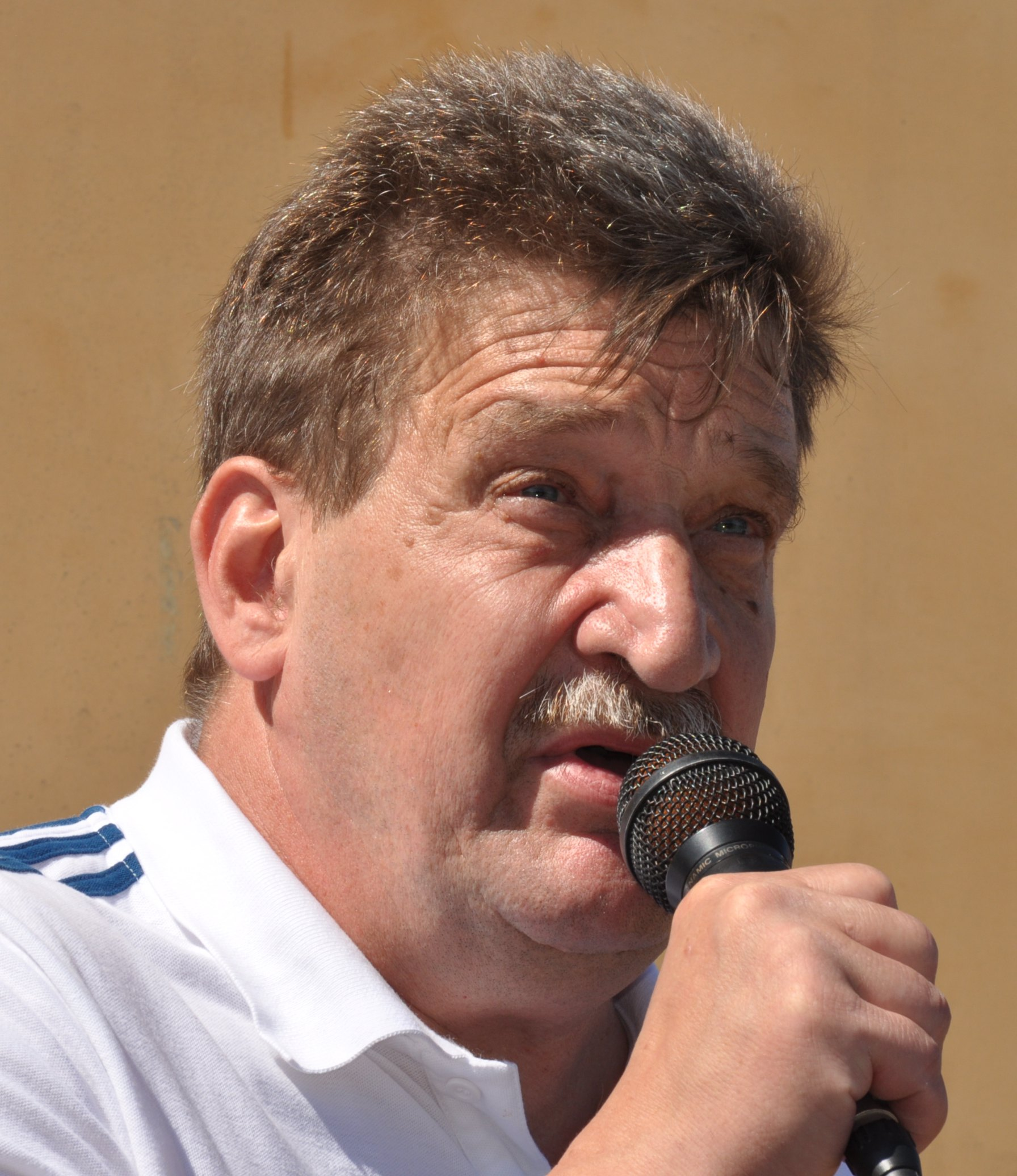
Pertti Alaja, the former President of the Finland FA, was posthumously named in 2017.

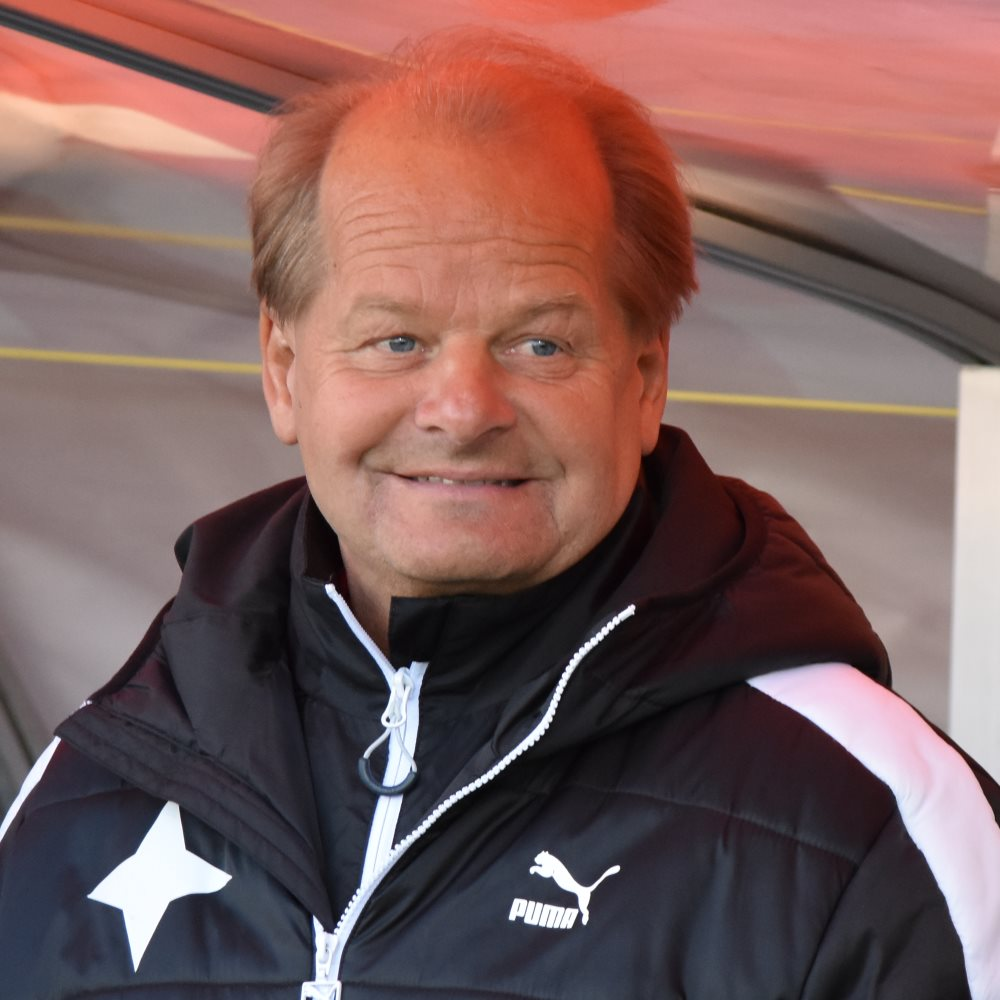
Former national team manager Antti Muurinen was named in 2019.

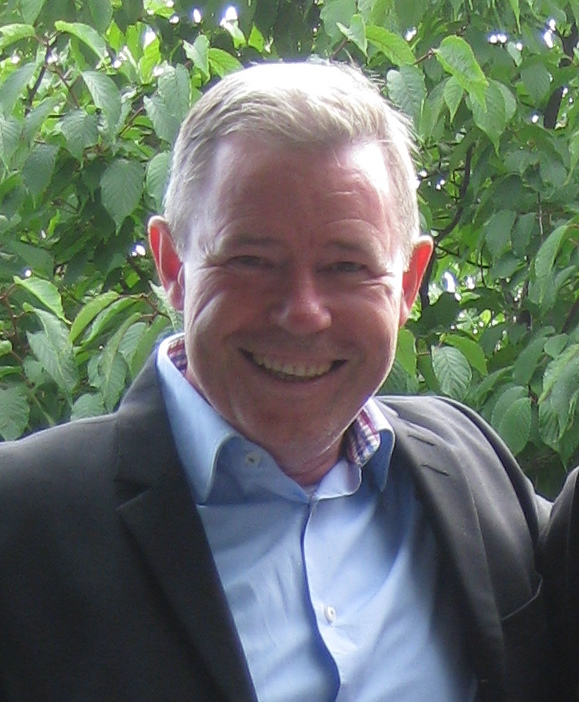
Former player and manager Keith Armstrong was named in 2023.

Name	Year	Role
(Finland) Arto Tolsa	1993	Former player
(Finland) Niilo Tammisalo	1993	Influential multi-sports figure in football, bandy, ice hockey and basketball
(Finland) Martti Hirviniemi	1993	Former referee
(Finland) Aatos Lehtonen	1993	Former player, represented Finland at the 1936 Summer Olympics
(Finland) Erik von Frenckell	1993	Sports executive, the president of the Finnish FA in 1918–1952
(Finland) Kai Pahlman	1993	Former player and coach
(Finland) Thure Sarnola	1993	Former goalkeeper and a long-time goalkeeping coach
(Finland) Eino Soinio	1993	Former player, represented Finland at the 1912 Summer Olympics
(Finland) Aulis Rytkönen	1993	Former player, the first Finnish professional player abroad
(Finland) Stig-Göran Myntti	1993	Former player, represented Finland at the 1952 Summer Olympics
(Finland) Max Viinioksa	1993	Former player
(Finland) Ernst Grönlund	1994	Former player
(Finland) Juhani Peltonen	1994	Former player
(Finland) Veikko Asikainen	1996	Former player, represented Finland at the 1952 Summer Olympics
(Finland) Juuso Walden	1997	Football executive, a long-time chairman of the Finnish FA
(Finland) Olavi Laaksonen	1997	Former player, represented Finland at the 1952 Summer Olympics
(Finland) Frans Karjagin	2003	Former player, represented Finland at the 1936 Summer Olympics
(Finland) Erkki Poroila	2003	Football executive, the Seceretary General of the Finnish FA in 1966–1983
(Finland) Ari Hjelm	2003	Former player and coach
(Finland) Verner Eklöf	2005	Former player
(Finland) Timo Kautonen	2005	Former player
(Finland) Kaarlo Soinio	2007	Former player and executive, represented Finland at the 1912 Summer Olympics
(Finland) Esko Malm	2007	Former player and manager
(Finland) Lars Näsman	2007	Former player and coach
(Finland) Tommy Lindholm	2007	Former player and manager
(Finland) Heikki Suhonen	2007	Former player and manager
(Finland) Atik Ismail	2007	Former player
(Finland) Hanna-Mari Sarlin	2007	Former player, the first female-inductee
(Finland) Kalevi Lehtovirta	2010	Former player, represented Finland at the 1952 Summer Olympics
(Finland) Olavi Haaskivi	2010	Former coach and a long-time coaching director of Finnish FA
(Finland) Georg Krutelew	2010	Former referee
(Finland) Matti Paatelainen	2010	Former player
(Finland) Kaija Salopuro	2010	Former player, had different roles in the Finnish FA for decades
(Finland) Anne Mäkinen	2012	Former player and manager
(Finland) Miikka Toivola	2012	Former player and manager
(Finland) Laura Österberg Kalmari	2014	Former player
(Finland) Sami Hyypiä	2015	Former player and manager
(Finland) Jari Litmanen	2015	Former player, the most capped player of the Finland national team and a long-time captain
(Finland) Pentti Seppälä	2015	Football executive, the president of the Finnish FA in 1987–1997
(Finland) Pertti Mäkipää	2015	Former player
(Finland) Anders Mattsson	2016	Former referee
(Finland) Olli Heinonen	2016	Former player
(Finland) Esko Ranta	2016	Former player
(Finland) Martti Kuusela	2016	Former player and manager
(Finland) Jaakko Lempinen	2017	Former player and football active
(Finland) Pekka Hämäläinen	2017	Former player and administrator, the President of the Finnish FA in 1997–2009
(Finland) Pertti Alaja	2017	Former player, the Secretary General and the President of the Finnish FA
(Finland) Göran Enckelman	2018	Former footballer and goalkeeping coach
(Finland) Jyrki Heliskoski	2018	Former manager and a long-time coaching director of the FA
(Finland) Ulla Kaasinen	2018	Former player and coach
(Finland) Katriina Elovirta	2018	Former player, referee and the development manager of the FA
(Finland) Göran Wallén	2018	Former football and sports journalist
(Finland) Matti Mäkelä	2018	Former footballer
(Finland) Christina Forssell	2018	Former footballer
(Finland) Simo Syrjävaara	2018	Former player and manager
(Finland) Olli Huttunen	2018	Former goalkeeper, manager and executive
(Finland) Gunnar Yliharju	2018	Long-time kit manager and active in the FA
(Finland) Maija Liukkonen	2019	Former player and manager
(Finland) Jonatan Johansson	2019	Former player and manager
(Finland) Olavi Rissanen	2019	Former player
(Finland) Keijo Voutilainen	2019	Former player and manager
(Finland) Antti Muurinen	2019	Former manager
(Russia) Valeri Popovitch	2020	Former player, the top goalscorer of Veikkausliiga, the Finnish premier league
(Finland) Esko S. Lahtinen	2021	Former sports journalist and author, former pr manager of the Finnish FA
(Finland) Pekka Luhtanen	2021	Researcher, pioneer in football game analysis
(Finland) Soile Ojala	2021	Former player
(Finland) Pasi Rautiainen	2021	Former player, manager and football commentator
(Finland) Markku Peltoniemi	2022	Former player and a long-time team manager of HJK
(Finland) Kari Ukkonen	2022	Former player and coach, represented Finland at the 1980 Summer Olympics
(Finland) Aki Lahtinen	2022	Former player
(Finland) Sanna Valkonen	2022	Former player
(England) Keith Armstrong	2023	Former player and manager
(Finland) Jukka Vakkila	2023	Former manager
(Finland) Jutta Rautiainen	2023	Former player and manager
(Finland) Jessica Julin	2023	Former player and manager
(Finland) Jyrki Nieminen	2024	Former player and manager
(Finland) Anna-Kaisa Rantanen	2024	Former player
(Finland) Jukka Ikäläinen	2024	Former player and manager
(Finland) Johanna Lindell	2025	Former goalkeeper
(Finland) Ismo Lius	2025	Former player
(Finland) Mika Lipponen	2025	Former player
(Finland) Mixu Paatelainen	2025	Former player and manager
(Finland) Pauliina Miettinen	2025	Former player and manager
