= Turo Kautonen =

Finnish footballer (born 1969)

Personal information
- Full name: Turo Tapani Kautonen
- Date of birth: 28 December 1969 (age 56)
- Place of birth: Lahti, Finland
- Height: 1.85 m (6 ft 1 in)
- Position: Centre-back

Youth career
- 1980–1989: Reipas

Senior career*
Years	Team	Apps	(Gls)
1987–1995	Reipas	109	(3)
1996	Kuusysi	24	(0)
1997–1998	Lahti	49	(0)
1999	Mikkeli	23	(0)
Total		205	(3)

International career
1987	Finland U17	4	(0)
1991	Finland U21	5	(0)
- * Club domestic league appearances and goals

Turo Tapani Kautonen (born 28 December 1969) is a Finnish former footballer who played as a centre-back.

== Club career ==
Kautonen joined the Reipas academy in 1980, and he made his Mestaruussarja debut for Reipas in 1987; he also scored once during the 1987 season. He missed two-and-a-half seasons due to an injury sustained during the springtime of 1988, and he scored his only goal in the Veikkausliiga on 1 July 1990 during the 3–0 victory against Mikkelin Palloilijat, and became a regular starter during the 1991 season while Reipas were relegated. In 1993, he was part of the Reipas team which were runners-up in the 1993 Kakkonen.

He joined Kuusysi ahead of the 1996 season and stayed in the Ykkönen as Reippas and Kuusysi merged to form FC Lahti in 1997. He left the club after they were promoted to the Veikkausliiga by winning the 1998 Ykkönen.

Kautonen joined Mikkeli on a one-year deal during the 1999 season and he played 23 matches for the club before he retired on 1 January 2000.

== International career ==
Kautonen represented Finland U17 in 1987 and Finland U21 in 1991 during 1992 UEFA European Under-21 Championship qualification.

== Personal life ==
His father Timo, brother Tommi, and uncles Mikko and Olli are former professional footballers, and later Tommi became a manager.

== Career statistics ==
Only league statistics are known.

Appearances and goals by club, season and competition
Club	Season	League		
Club	Season	Division	Apps	Goals
Reipas	1987	Mestaruussarja	9	1
Reipas	1988	Mestaruussarja	0	0
Reipas	1989	Mestaruussarja	0	0
Reipas	1990	Veikkausliiga	10	1
Reipas	1991	Veikkausliiga	30	0
Reipas	1992	Ykkönen	22	0
Reipas	1993	Kakkonen	20	1
Reipas	1994	Ykkönen	10	0
Reipas	1995	Ykkönen	8	0
Reipas	Total		109	3
Kuusysi	1996	Ykkönen	24	0
Lahti	1997	Ykkönen	26	0
Lahti	1998	Ykkönen	23	0
Mikkeli	1999	Ykkönen	23	0
Mikkeli	Total		96	0
Career total			205	3

== Honours ==
Reipas

- Mestaruussarja/Premier League: third place 1988
- Kakkonen/Second Division: runner-up 1993

Lahti

- Ykkönen/First Division: 1998
