= Rautiainen =

Rautiainen is a Finnish surname. Notable people with the surname include:

- Jutta Rautiainen (born 1963), Finnish association football player
- Matti Rautiainen (born 1955), Finnish ice hockey player
- Pasi Rautiainen (born 1961), Finnish football manager and former player
- Teemu Rautiainen (born 1992), Finnish professional ice hockey player
- Timo Rautiainen (musician) (born 1963), Finnish heavy metal singer, guitarist and songwriter
- Timo Rautiainen (co-driver) (born 1964), Finnish rally co-driver
