= 1976–77 Nemzeti Bajnokság I =

Nemzeti Bajnokság I
- Season: 1976–77

Statistics of Nemzeti Bajnokság I in the 1976–77 season.

== Overview ==
It was contested by 18 teams, and Vasas SC won the championship.

== League standings ==
Pos	Team	Pld	W	D	L	GF	GA	GD	Pts	Qualification or relegation
1	Vasas (C)	34	25	3	6	100	45	+55	53	Qualification for European Cup first round
2	Újpesti Dózsa	34	22	6	6	88	47	+41	50	Qualification for UEFA Cup first round
3	Ferencváros	34	18	11	5	78	42	+36	47	Qualification for UEFA Cup first round
4	Budapest Honvéd	34	19	8	7	62	43	+19	46	
5	Haladás	34	14	8	12	53	49	+4	36	
6	Videoton	34	14	7	13	60	46	+14	35	
7	Rába ETO Győr	34	15	5	14	51	46	+5	35	
8	MTK-VM	34	15	5	14	56	53	+3	35	
9	Tatabányai Bányász	34	15	3	16	58	56	+2	33	
10	Diósgyőr	34	13	6	15	40	52	−12	32	Qualification for Cup Winners' Cup first round
11	Zalaegerszeg	34	12	7	15	47	47	0	31	
12	SZEOL	34	11	8	15	39	64	−25	30	
13	Békéscsaba	34	9	10	15	40	57	−17	28	
14	Kaposvár	34	9	9	16	39	45	−6	27	
15	Dunaújvárosi Kohász	34	9	9	16	37	60	−23	27	
16	Csepel	34	8	10	16	45	59	−14	26	
17	Salgótarján (R)	34	10	5	19	42	77	−35	25	Relegation to Nemzeti Bajnokság II
18	Dorogi AC (R)	34	5	6	23	28	75	−47	16	Relegation to Nemzeti Bajnokság II

Source: rsssf.com
(C) Champions; (R) Relegated

== Results ==
Home \ Away	BÉK	CSE	DIÓ	DOR	DUN	FTC	HAL	HON	KAP	MTK	GYŐ	SAL	SZE	TAT	ÚJP	VAS	VID	ZTE
Békéscsaba		2–1	2–0	4–1	4–0	1–1	2–2	0–2	1–1	1–2	2–1	1–0	1–1	1–0	2–2	2–3	2–5	2–1
Csepel	1–1		0–1	3–0	6–0	0–5	0–1	0–2	1–2	1–1	4–1	0–0	3–2	0–2	2–1	0–2	2–2	4–2
Diósgyőr	1–0	2–0		1–0	2–2	3–2	1–1	1–0	0–0	3–1	1–1	2–0	2–1	1–2	2–5	2–2	1–0	3–0
Dorogi AC	2–0	1–1	4–1		0–0	0–3	0–1	2–2	2–1	2–2	3–5	1–0	1–1	0–2	2–1	1–5	1–2	1–3
Dunaújvárosi Kohász	0–0	4–1	2–1	2–0		2–2	1–1	1–2	1–1	1–2	0–1	4–0	3–0	0–3	1–1	2–3	0–0	2–1
Ferencváros	3–2	3–3	3–1	5–0	3–1		1–2	2–0	2–0	4–1	2–1	5–2	4–0	3–3	1–2	3–2	2–0	1–1
Haladás	1–0	1–2	2–0	4–0	0–2	1–2		5–6	1–0	2–0	2–0	1–1	3–3	4–3	1–1	1–4	4–0	1–0
Budapest Honvéd	1–1	1–0	2–0	1–0	1–1	0–2	2–1		3–0	1–1	2–2	6–0	5–2	2–1	2–2	2–1	1–0	1–0
Kaposvár	2–2	3–3	2–1	3–0	1–2	0–2	2–0	1–3		2–0	0–1	4–0	2–0	2–1	2–3	1–1	1–0	1–1
MTK-VM	1–1	2–1	1–0	4–1	2–1	3–3	1–3	3–0	1–0		3–0	2–0	3–0	3–1	0–2	1–2	3–1	4–2
Rába ETO Győr	0–1	4–0	0–1	2–1	5–0	1–1	0–1	1–1	1–0	1–0		3–2	3–0	5–1	2–0	1–2	3–1	2–0
Salgótarján	1–0	1–3	5–2	2–0	1–2	1–1	2–1	0–3	2–2	3–2	3–1		2–0	3–2	2–1	3–5	0–0	1–0
SZEOL	4–0	0–0	3–0	2–1	2–0	1–1	2–1	0–1	1–0	2–1	0–0	4–2		2–1	1–3	1–0	2–1	1–1
Tatabányai Bányász	2–0	2–0	1–1	1–0	2–0	1–1	2–1	1–2	3–1	1–2	3–0	3–0	1–0		3–4	1–2	3–2	1–0
Újpesti Dózsa	6–1	0–0	4–1	3–0	2–0	0–3	3–0	4–1	2–1	5–2	2–1	4–1	5–0	3–2		1–4	2–1	3–0
Vasas	3–0	5–2	2–0	5–0	3–0	4–1	5–2	2–1	0–0	2–1	5–0	4–1	5–0	5–1	4–5		4–2	3–1
Videoton	3–0	2–0	1–2	1–1	3–0	2–0	1–1	3–3	1–0	2–0	2–1	4–0	7–0	4–2	1–1	3–1		2–1
Zalaegerszeg	3–1	1–1	1–0	2–0	4–0	1–1	0–0	3–0	3–1	2–1	0–1	4–1	1–1	2–0	1–5	3–0	2–1	

Source: rsssf.com
Legend: Blue = home team win; Yellow = draw; Red = away team win.

== Statistical leaders ==
=== Top goalscorers ===
Rank	Scorer	Club	Goals
1	(Hungary) Béla Várady	Vasas SC	36
2	(Hungary) László Fazekas	Újpesti Dózsa	21
2	(Hungary) Mihály Kozma	Budapest Honvéd	21
4	(Hungary) László Fekete	Újpesti Dózsa	16
4	(Hungary) István Gass	Vasas SC	16
4	(Hungary) Tibor Nyilasi	Ferencvárosi TC	16
7	(Hungary) János Nagy	Videoton SC	14
8	(Hungary) László Szokolai	Rába ETO	13
9	(Hungary) László Tieber	Videoton SC	12
9	(Hungary) István Vad	Ferencvárosi TC	12
9	(Hungary) István Weimper	Budapest Honvéd	12

== Attendances ==
#	Club	Average
1	Ferencváros	20,765
2	Újpest	15,667
3	Békéscsaba	13,353
4	Vasas	12,706
5	Haladás	9,971
6	MTK	9,765
7	Kaposvár	8,765
8	Diósgyör	8,588
9	Videoton	8,118
10	Budapest Honvéd	7,862
11	Zalaegerszeg	6,824
12	SZEOL	6,441
13	Salgótarján	5,706
14	Csepel	5,088
15	Győr	5,059
16	Dorog	4,971
17	Tatabánya	4,618
18	Dunaújváros	4,500
