= 1977–78 Magyar Kupa =

Tournament details
- Country: Hungary

Final positions
- Champions: Ferencvárosi TC
- Runners-up: Pécsi MSC

The 1977–78 Magyar Kupa (English: Hungarian Cup) was the 38th season of Hungary's annual knock-out cup football competition.

== Final ==
20 August 1978
17:00 (UTC+2)

Ferencvárosi TC	4–2 (a.e.t.)	Pécsi MSC
Bálint 52'; Pogány 72' (pen.); Szokolai 94'; Martos 119'	Report	Dárdai 3'; Varga 35'

Népstadion, Budapest
Attendance: 15,000
Referee: László Pádár (Hungary)

== See also ==
- 1977–78 Nemzeti Bajnokság I
