= Unto Nevalainen =

Finnish footballer (born 1935)

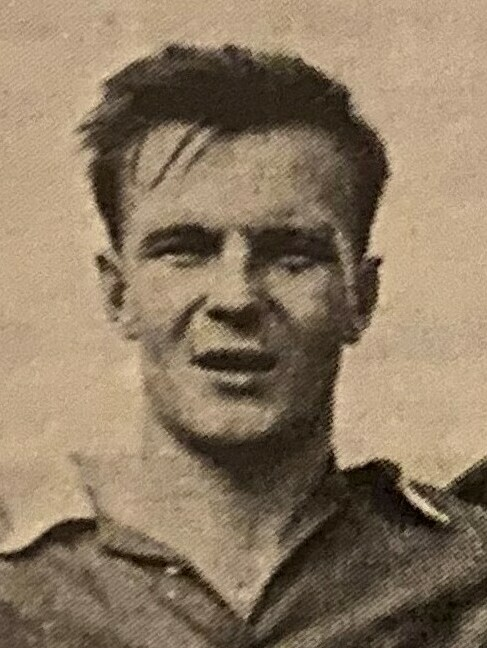
- Nevalainen in 1959

Personal information
- Date of birth: 13 June 1935 (age 91)
- Position: Midfielder

Senior career*
Years	Team	Apps	(Gls)
1955–1956	Kokkolan Jymy		(4)
1957	Turun Palloseura	17	(9)
1958–1961	HIFK	78	(22)
1962–1963	Reipas Lahti	8	(1)
1967–1969	Koparit		(6)

International career
1957–1961	Finland	21	(1)
- * Club domestic league appearances and goals

Unto Nevalainen (born 13 June 1935) is a Finnish former footballer who played as a midfielder. He made 21 appearances for the Finland national team from 1957 to 1961. He was chosen Finnish Footballer of the Year in 1959. He played for Turun Palloseura, HIFK and Reipas Lahti in Mestaruussarja. He also played ice hockey.
