= 1977–78 Nemzeti Bajnokság I =

Nemzeti Bajnokság I
- Season: 1977–78

Final standings of the 1977–78 Hungarian League season.

== Final standings ==
Pos	Team	Pld	W	D	L	GF	GA	GD	Pts	Qualification or relegation
1	Újpesti Dózsa (C)	34	19	13	2	95	46	+49	51	Qualification for European Cup first round
2	Budapest Honvéd	34	22	6	6	67	22	+45	50	Qualification for UEFA Cup first round
3	MTK-VM	34	18	11	5	57	29	+28	47	Qualification for UEFA Cup first round
4	Videoton	34	17	11	6	77	46	+31	45	
5	Vasas	34	15	12	7	58	42	+16	42	
6	Diósgyőr	34	11	14	9	44	36	+8	36	
7	Dunaújvárosi Kohász	34	12	12	10	58	53	+5	36	
8	Tatabányai Bányász	34	12	11	11	49	47	+2	35	
9	Ferencváros	34	11	12	11	54	51	+3	34	Qualification for Cup Winners' Cup first round
10	Békéscsaba	34	12	7	15	43	57	−14	31	
11	Csepel	34	11	8	15	46	57	−11	30	
12	Zalaegerszeg	34	9	11	14	39	63	−24	29	
13	Pécsi MSC	34	10	8	16	42	48	−6	28	
14	Haladás	34	9	10	15	43	56	−13	28	
15	Rába ETO Győr	34	6	13	15	37	52	−15	25	
16	Székesfehérvári MÁV Előre	34	9	6	19	44	78	−34	24	
17	Kaposvár (R)	34	8	7	19	32	61	−29	23	Relegation to Nemzeti Bajnokság II
18	SZEOL (R)	34	6	6	22	35	76	−41	18	Relegation to Nemzeti Bajnokság II

Source: rsssf.com
(C) Champions; (R) Relegated

== Results ==
Home \ Away	BÉK	CSE	DIÓ	DUN	FTC	HAL	HON	KAP	MTK	PÉC	GYŐ	SME	SZE	TAT	ÚJP	VAS	VID	ZTE
Békéscsaba		2–0	1–1	3–0	0–0	2–0	1–0	2–0	1–2	1–0	3–0	2–0	1–0	0–0	1–4	2–3	1–1	1–1
Csepel	6–1		1–0	2–1	3–2	2–2	0–0	2–1	1–2	3–1	2–0	1–2	3–0	1–1	2–2	2–1	2–2	1–2
Diósgyőr	2–1	1–0		2–0	2–0	0–0	1–1	4–0	1–1	0–2	0–0	4–1	4–0	3–1	2–2	0–0	1–2	3–0
Dunaújvárosi Kohász	5–0	1–1	2–0		3–2	2–2	1–4	2–1	1–2	3–1	2–0	1–1	2–2	1–1	1–1	1–1	1–1	3–0
Ferencváros	2–1	5–2	1–1	1–3		3–1	2–1	2–2	2–0	1–1	0–0	1–0	3–2	5–3	1–1	1–1	0–3	5–0
Haladás	0–3	3–2	2–2	1–1	1–1		0–0	3–1	0–1	4–1	3–0	3–0	3–2	1–2	1–1	0–2	1–1	5–1
Budapest Honvéd	2–0	2–0	3–0	3–2	3–2	2–0		4–0	2–0	3–0	2–0	2–0	4–0	2–0	0–1	2–0	1–0	2–0
Kaposvár	0–2	2–1	1–0	0–1	1–0	1–0	1–3		2–2	1–0	2–1	1–1	1–0	2–3	1–2	3–0	0–0	2–2
MTK-VM	3–1	3–0	3–0	4–1	1–1	4–1	3–2	2–0		1–0	1–0	5–0	6–0	2–0	1–1	0–0	2–1	0–0
Pécsi MSC	2–0	0–1	2–1	1–1	1–0	0–1	0–2	1–1	1–1		4–0	2–1	0–0	3–3	2–3	1–1	4–1	2–0
Rába ETO Győr	3–1	2–0	1–1	2–4	1–2	0–0	1–1	4–0	4–0	1–1		0–0	2–0	2–0	0–0	2–5	2–2	1–2
Székesfehérvári MÁV Előre	1–2	0–1	1–1	1–3	0–1	2–1	1–6	1–0	1–0	2–3	2–1		3–1	4–1	1–4	3–5	1–2	4–2
SZEOL	2–1	2–0	2–2	1–4	2–2	0–1	1–2	0–0	1–0	1–0	3–1	2–2		0–2	6–2	1–2	1–2	0–2
Tatabányai Bányász	2–2	0–0	1–2	3–0	1–0	2–0	1–1	3–0	1–1	0–1	1–1	4–0	2–0		3–3	1–2	1–0	3–1
Újpesti Dózsa	6–1	5–2	0–0	2–0	1–1	5–1	3–2	5–1	0–0	1–0	2–2	8–2	6–1	3–1		1–0	4–0	6–0
Vasas	2–2	4–2	3–0	2–2	4–1	1–0	1–0	3–1	1–2	2–1	1–1	1–1	3–1	0–1	2–4		2–2	2–0
Videoton	4–0	5–0	0–2	5–3	2–1	6–0	0–0	4–3	1–1	4–2	1–1	5–2	5–1	4–1	6–4	1–1		3–0
Zalaegerszeg	3–1	0–0	1–1	0–0	3–3	3–2	0–3	1–0	1–1	3–2	4–1	2–3	3–0	0–0	2–2	0–0	0–1	

Source: rsssf.com
Legend: Blue = home team win; Yellow = draw; Red = away team win.

== Statistical leaders ==
=== Top goalscorers ===
Rank	Scorer	Club	Goals
1	(Hungary) László Fazekas	Újpesti Dózsa	24
2	(Hungary) László Fekete	Újpesti Dózsa	19
2	(Hungary) Mihály Kozma	Budapest Honvéd	19
4	(Hungary) Kiss Sándor	Pécsi MSC	17
4	(Hungary) József Szabó	Videoton SC	17
4	(Hungary) László Szokolai	Ferencvárosi TC	17
4	(Hungary) Béla Várady	Vasas SC	17
8	(Hungary) Nagy László	Újpesti Dózsa	16
8	(Hungary) István Weimper	Budapest Honvéd	16
10	(Hungary) László Tieber	Videoton SC	14

== Attendances ==
Average home league attendance top 3:

#	Club	Average
1	Ferencváros	19,706
2	Újpest	14,059
3	Békéscsaba	11,000
