= Palloiluseura Apollo =

Finnish football club

- Full name: Palloiluseura Apollo
- Nickname(s): Apollo
- Founded: 1956
- Ground: Kankurin tekonurmi, Hyvinkää, Finland
- Chairman: Ari Alajoki
- Coach: Petri Virtanen (Finland) Pekka Mononen
- League: Vitonen
Home colours

Palloiluseura Apollo (abbreviated Apollo) is a football club from Hyvinkää, Finland. The club was formed in 1956 and currently plays in the Vitonen (Fifth Division). Their home ground is at the Kankurin tekonurmi. The Club chairman is Ari Alajoki.

== History ==
Apollo has spent many seasons in the lower divisions of the Finnish football league but they have had two spells covering 5 seasons in the third tier, the Kakkonen (Second Division), in 1980–81 and 1985–87.

In the 1985 season Atik Ismail, the former Finnish international, scored 11 goals for Apollo. The team finished in third position in the West Group of the Second Division and achieved their highest ever attendance of 965 spectators for a home match against Honka. However the most startling attendance of the 1985 season was the 4,349 people who attended the KontU-Apollo league match.

In the 1986 season Apollo finished in second place in the East Group of the Second Division, falling just one league point behind the leaders GrIFK who were promoted. This was the high point of the club's history and was followed in 1987 by relegation and the downward spiral that was soon to gain momentum.

One of the highlights of Hyvinkää football in the 1970s and 1980s were the derby matches with local rivals, Hyvinkään Palloseura, and for a period Apollo were the leading club in the town. However, over the last two decades the club's fortunes have fluctuated and they have sadly dropped to the Vitonen (Fifth Division) in recent years.

There remain links with the club's halcyon days with Pekka Mononen (now the club coach) and Rudel Matamala still registered as players with Apollo some 25 years later.

== Season to season ==
Season	Level	Division	Section	Administration	Position	Movements
1998	Tier 5	Nelonen (Fourth Division)	Section 4	Uusimaa District (SPL Uusimaa)	3rd	
1999	Tier 5	Nelonen (Fourth Division)	Section 4	Uusimaa District (SPL Uusimaa)	1st	Promoted
2000	Tier 4	Kolmonen (Third Division)	Section 2	Helsinki & Uusimaa (SPL Uusimaa)	8th	
2001	Tier 4	Kolmonen (Third Division)	Section 2	Helsinki & Uusimaa (SPL Uusimaa)	10th	
2002	Tier 4	Kolmonen (Third Division)	Section 2	Helsinki & Uusimaa (SPL Uusimaa)	12th	Relegated
2003	Tier 5	Nelonen (Fourth Division)	Section 2	Uusimaa District (SPL Uusimaa)	9th	
2004	Tier 5	Nelonen (Fourth Division)	Section 2	Uusimaa District (SPL Uusimaa)	7th	
2005	Tier 5	Nelonen (Fourth Division)	Section 2	Uusimaa District (SPL Uusimaa)	5th	
2006	Tier 5	Nelonen (Fourth Division)	Section 2	Uusimaa District (SPL Uusimaa)	5th	
2007	Tier 5	Nelonen (Fourth Division)	Section 2	Uusimaa District (SPL Uusimaa)	10th	Relegated
2008	Tier 6	Vitonen (Fifth Division)	Section 4	Uusimaa District (SPL Uusimaa)	4th	
2009	Tier 6	Vitonen (Fifth Division)	Section 4	Uusimaa District (SPL Uusimaa)	5th	
2010	Tier 6	Vitonen (Fifth Division)	Section 4	Uusimaa District (SPL Uusimaa)		

- 3 seasons in Kolmonen
- 7 seasons in Nelonen
- 3 seasons in Vitonen

== Club structure ==
Palloiluseura Apollo run one team. The club do not have a junior section.

== 2010 season ==
Apollo are competing in Section 4 (Lohko 4) of the Vitonen administered by the Uusimaa SPL. This is the sixth highest tier in the Finnish football system. In 2009 Apollo finished in 5th place in Section 4 of the Vitonen.

== Notable former players ==
Former players that have played in a fully professional league:

- (Finland) Atik Ismail
- (England) Alan Waddle
- (England) Mark Miller

== References and sources ==
- Official Website
