= Christina Forssell =

Finnish footballer (born 1973)

Personal information
- Date of birth: 25 November 1973 (age 52)
- Position: Midfielder

International career
Years	Team	Apps	(Gls)
	Finland	70	

Christina Forssell (born 25 November 1973) is a Finnish former footballer who played for HJK and the Finnish women's national team. She played for HJK 254 times. Forsell also played abroad in Sweden for Hammarby IF.

In 2007, Forsell was inducted into HJK's hall of fame, and in 2018 she was named in the Finnish Football Hall of Fame.

== Personal life ==
After retiring from football, Forssell worked as a football coach. Christina Forssell's brother is footballer Mikael Forssell.

== Honours ==
HJK

- 9 Finnish Leagues
- 7 Finnish Cups
