= Timo Kautonen =

Finnish footballer (1945–2026)

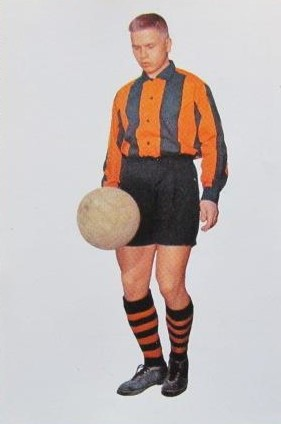
- Kautonen in 1965

Personal information
- Date of birth: 12 March 1945
- Place of birth: Lahti, Finland
- Date of death: 5 May 2026 (aged 81)
- Position: Centre-back

Senior career*
Years	Team	Apps	(Gls)
1963–1978	Reipas	330	(11)
1979–1981	LaPS		
1982–1983	FC Kuusysi	53	(0)
1984	Reipas	19	(0)

International career
1964–1976	Finland	42	(0)
- * Club domestic league appearances and goals

Timo Kautonen (12 March 1945 – 5 May 2026) was a Finnish footballer who played as a centre-back. He made 42 appearances for the Finland national team from 1964 to 1976. Kautonen played for over 20 seasons in Lahti based clubs, mostly for Reipas Lahti. He was inducted into the Finnish Football Hall of Fame in 2005.

Kautonen died on 5 May 2026, at the age of 81. His sons Turo Kautonen and Tommi Kautonen are former professional footballers, and later Tommi became a manager.
