= 1994 Ykkönen – Finnish League Division 1 =

Finnish League Division 1
- Season: 1994
- Champions: Ponnistus Helsinki
- Promoted: Ponnistus Helsinki; VPS Vaasa
- Relegated: BK-IFK Vaasa; PIF Parainen; KajHa Kajaani; 1991 Oulu

League table for teams participating in Ykkönen, the second tier of the Finnish Soccer League system, in 1994.

== League table ==
Pos	Team	Pld	W	D	L	GF	GA	GD	Pts
1	Ponnistus Helsinki	26	17	7	2	40	10	+30	58
2	VPS Vaasa	26	13	11	2	59	20	+39	50
3	Inter Turku	26	11	9	6	47	25	+22	42
4	Reipas Lahti	26	13	2	11	53	48	+5	41
5	KontU Helsinki	26	9	10	7	33	26	+7	37
6	P-Iirot Rauma	26	8	11	7	34	32	+2	35
7	KePS Kemi	26	10	5	11	39	42	−3	35
8	PV Kokkola (Note: formerly KPV Kokkola)	26	9	6	11	34	42	−8	33
9	Kultsu Joutseno	26	8	8	10	35	41	−6	32
10	KTP Kotka	26	8	7	11	37	43	−6	31
11	BK-IFK Vaasa	26	7	6	13	43	50	−7	27
12	PIF Parainen	26	7	6	13	42	56	−14	27
13	KajHa Kajaani	26	6	8	12	30	38	−8	26
14	1991 Oulu	26	6	4	16	27	80	−53	22

== See also ==
- Veikkausliiga (Tier 1)
