= Tuomo Hakala =

Finnish footballer (born 1957)

Personal information
- Date of birth: 9 October 1957 (age 69)
- Place of birth: Finland
- Height: 1.88 m (6 ft 2 in)
- Position: Forward

Senior career*
Years	Team	Apps	(Gls)
1977–1987	RoPS Rovaniemi		

International career^{‡}
1979–1983	Finland	11	(1)
- * Club domestic league appearances and goals as of 13 September 2017 (UTC) ‡ National team caps and goals as of 13 September 2017 (UTC)

Tuomo Hakala (born 9 October 1957) is a retired Finnish footballer. During his club career, Hakala solely played for RoPS Rovaniemi. He made 9 appearances for the Finland national team. He played for Finland in Euro 1980 qualifications scoring once in the final qualification match against the Soviet Union.

== Career statistics ==
=== International goals ===
No.	Date	Venue	Opponent	Score	Result	Competition
1	31 October 1979	Central Lenin Stadium, Moscow, Soviet Union	Soviet Union	2–2	2–2	UEFA Euro 1980 qualifying
