= Pertti Alaja =

Finnish footballer and president of the Football Association of Finland

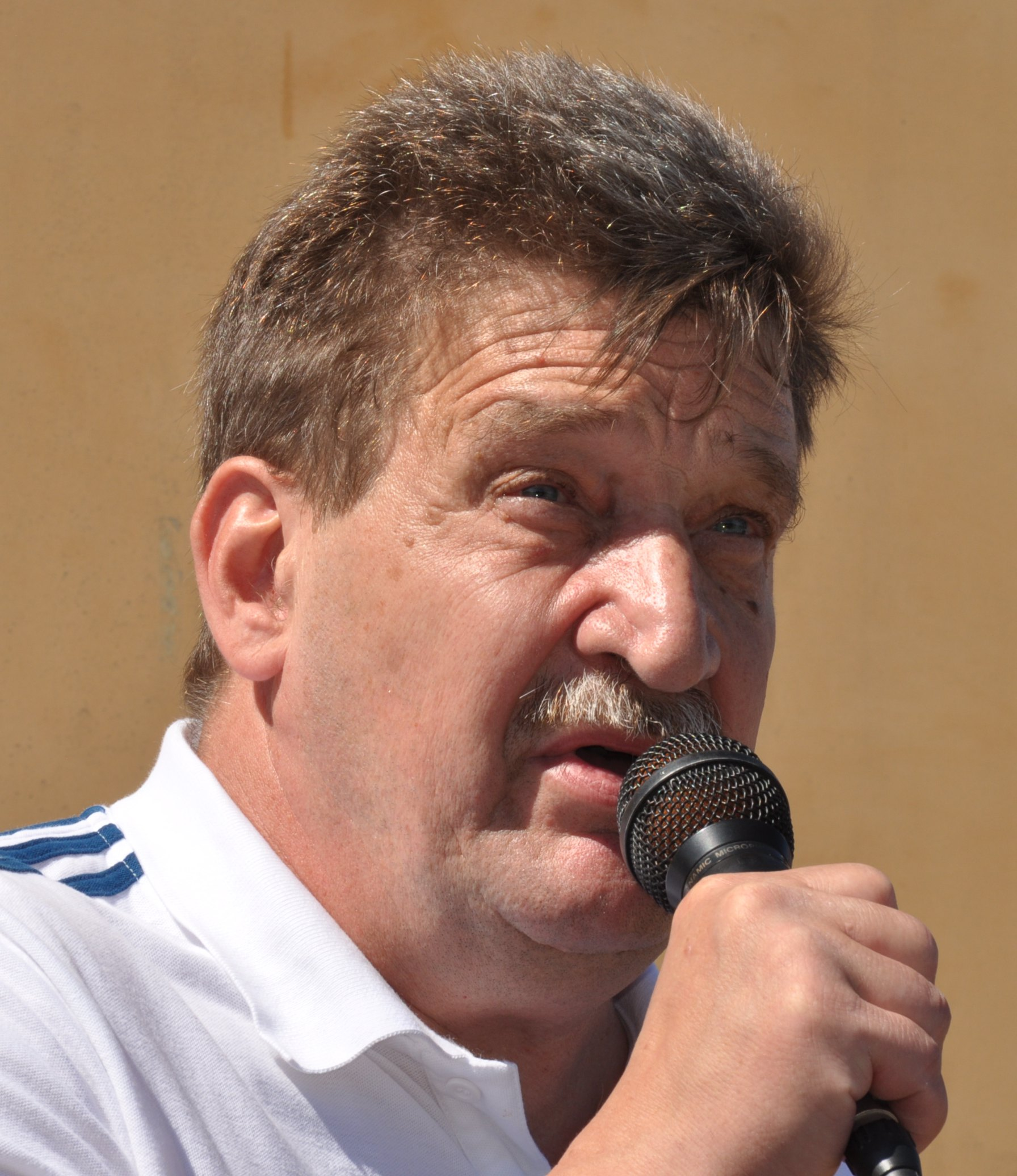
- Pertti Alaja in 2012.

President of Football Association of Finland
- In office 2012–2017
- Preceded by: Sauli Niinistö
- Succeeded by: Markku Lehtola

Personal details
- Occupation: Footballer; Football administrator
Association football career
- Full name: Pertti Johannes Alaja
- Date of birth: 18 February 1952
- Place of birth: Helsinki, Finland
- Date of death: 18 August 2017 (aged 65)
- Place of death: Espoo, Finland
- Position: Goalkeeper
Senior career*
Years	Team	Apps	(Gls)
1971-1972	Haka	31	(0)
1973-1975	HJK	57	(0)
1976-1977	OTP	44	(0)
1978–1979	Ikast	23	(0)
1980–1981	Edmonton Drillers	47	(0)
1982–1983	Malmö FF	44	(0)
International career
	Finland	29	(0)
Managerial career
- 1984–1986: HIFK
- 1987–1989: PPJ
- 1988–1989: Finland (gk coach)
- * Club domestic league appearances and goals

Pertti Johannes Alaja (18 February 1952 – 18 August 2017) was a Finnish football executive and a former footballer who played as a goalkeeper.

Alaja served as the Secretary General of the Football Association of Finland during 1991–2000 and the vice-president during 2004–2006. He was also the tournament director of the FIFA World Cup 2010.

Alaja was elected the 15th president of the Finnish FA on 14 October 2012, replacing Sauli Niinistö who was elected President of Finland, and served in the position until his death in 2017.

Alaja died on 18 August 2017. He was previously diagnosed with cancer.

In November 2017, Alaja was posthumously awarded the Captain's Ball, the most prestigious personal award by the Football Association of Finland. He was also named in the Finnish Football Hall of Fame.

Alaja had also previously played handball at the highest domestic level.

His late brother Erkki Alaja was also a professional footballer and handball player, and later worked in various positions in sports management.

== Honours ==
HJK

- Mestaruussarja: 1973

Individual

- Football Association of Finland: The Captain's Ball 2017
- Hall of Fame of Finnish football

Sporting positions
Preceded by Sauli Niinistö	President of the Football Association of Finland; 2012–2017	Succeeded by Markku Lehtola
