= Göran Enckelman =

Finnish footballer (born 1948)

Personal information
- Date of birth: 14 June 1948 (age 78)
- Place of birth: Lahti, Finland
- Position: Goalkeeper

Senior career*
Years	Team	Apps	(Gls)
1966–1969	Reipas	34	(0)
1970	KuPS	15	(0)
1971–1976	TPS Turku	128	(0)
1977	Haka	3	(0)
1978–1984	Nyköping	130	(0)

International career
1973–1978	Finland	21	(0)
- * Club domestic league appearances and goals

Göran Enckelman (born 14 June 1948) is a Finnish former footballer. He played in both Finland and Sweden, and for the Finnish national side. He is the father of fellow goalkeeper Peter Enckelman. He won Finnish Footballer of the Year in 1975. At club level he played for Reipas, KuPS, TPS, Haka and Nyköpings BIS.

After retiring he worked at TPS as goalkeeping coach.
