= Markku Peltoniemi =

Finnish football player (born 1948)

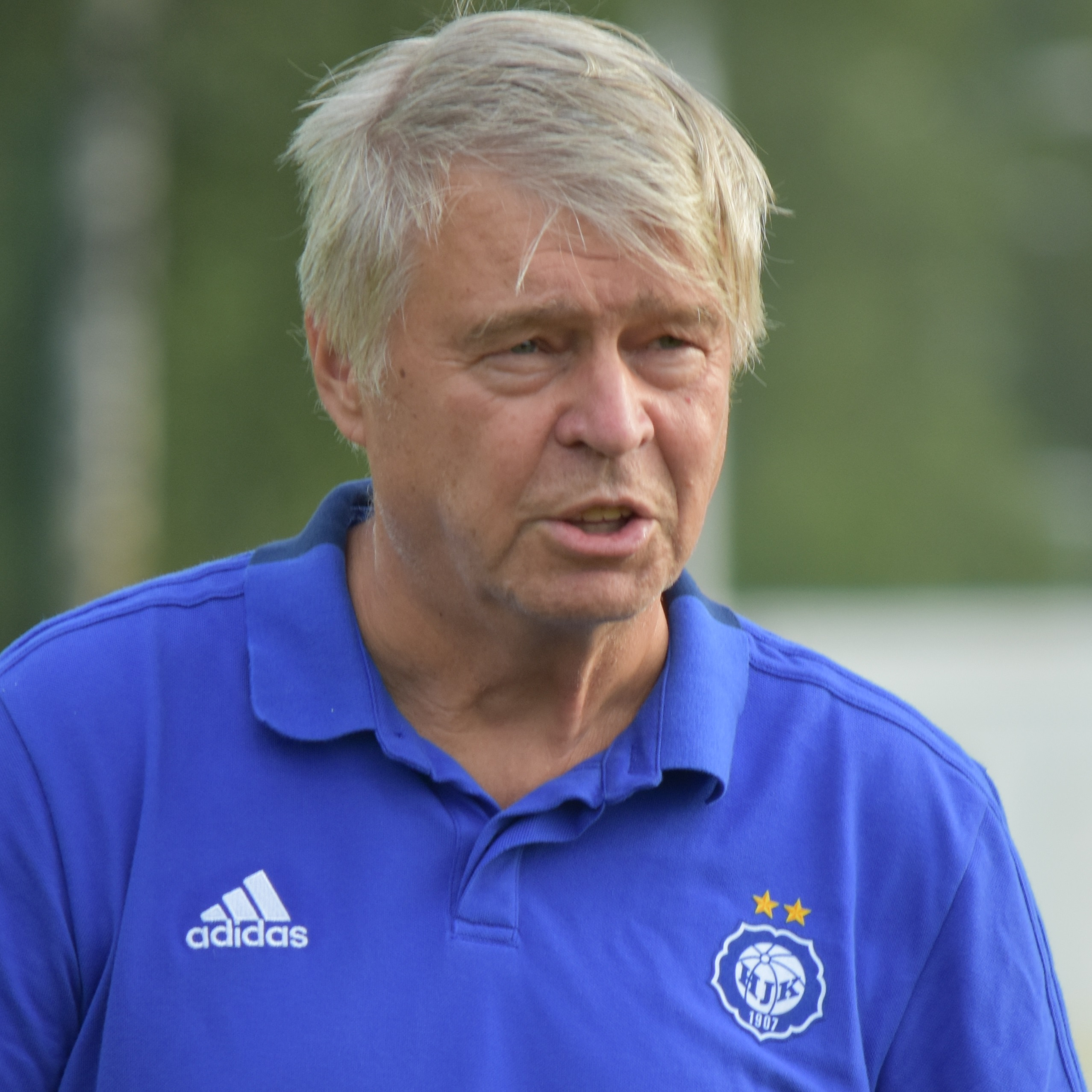
- Peltoniemi with HJK in 2018

Personal information
- Date of birth: 8 February 1948
- Place of birth: Helsinki, Finland
- Position: Midfielder

Youth career
- 1960-1964: HJK

Senior career*
| Years | Team | Apps | (Gls) |
| 1965–1975 | HJK | 141 | (13) |
| 1976–1978 | HPS | | |

Managerial career
- 1980–2022: HJK (team manager)
- * Club domestic league appearances and goals

Markku Peltoniemi (born 8 February 1948) is a Finnish former footballer and a former sporting director for Helsingin Jalkapalloklubi Peltoniemi was inducted into the Finnish Football Hall of Fame in 2022.

== Career ==
Peltoniemi grew up in Töölö area in Helsinki and joined Helsingin Jalkapalloklubi, the club he supported, as a 12 years old, youngest possible youth team at the time. He went through HJK youth teams and was promoted to first team in 1965 season. In he's first season he scored against Manchester United in a European cup tie. He spend 11 seasons playing for HJK in Finnish top flight mestaruussarja before being released from the club. For three seasons in 1976-1978 he played for another local club Helsingin Palloseura in first and second division before a single season in Vantaan Pallo.

In 1980 he started as a sporting director for HJK and has hold that position for over 40 years.

As an amateur footballer, alongside he's football career Peltoniemi also worked in banking industry.

He earned 5 caps for Finland's youth national teams.

== Honours ==
=== As player ===
- Finnish Championship: 1973
- Finnish Cup: 1966

=== As sporting director ===
- Finnish Championship: 1981, 1985, 1987, 1988, 1990, 1992, 1997, 2002, 2003, 2009, 2010, 2011, 2012, 2013, 2014, 2017, 2018, 2020
- Finnish Cup: 1981, 1984, 1993, 1996, 1998, 2000, 2003, 2006, 2008, 2011, 2014, 2016–17, 2020

Individual

- Football Association of Finland: Captain's Ball 2014
