= Alpo Lintamo =

Finnish footballer (1933–2014)

Personal information
- Date of birth: 19 March 1933
- Date of death: 18 January 2014 (aged 80)
- Position: Centre-half

Senior career*
Years	Team	Apps	(Gls)
1950–1955	Vaasan Palloseura		(22)
1956–1963	Helsingin Palloseura	140	(9)

International career
1955–1958	Finland	13	(0)
- * Club domestic league appearances and goals

Alpo Lintamo (19 March 1933 – 18 January 2014) was a Finnish footballer who played as a centre-half. He made 13 appearances for the Finland national team from 1955 to 1958. He played his whole career in Finland representing Vaasan Palloseura and Helsingin Palloseura.

== Honours ==
Helsingin Palloseura

- Mestaruussarja: 1957
- Finnish Cup: 1962

Individual

- Finnish Footballer of the Year: 1957
