= Kaija Salopuro =

Finnish footballer and women's football advocate

Personal information
- Date of birth: 1938 (age 87–88)
- Place of birth: Ylivieska, Finland

Senior career*
Years	Team	Apps	(Gls)
1971–?	HJK		
- * Club domestic league appearances and goals as of 17:21, 22 April 2021 (UTC)

Kaija Salopuro (born 1938) is a Finnish former footballer who won five women's football championships with Helsingin Jalkapalloklubi between 1971 and 1975. She later worked for the Football Association of Finland and received multiple awards for her contributions to Finnish women's football.

== Personal life ==
Salopuro is from Ylivieska, Finland. In her early life, she participated in baseball and athletics.

== Career ==
Salopuro moved to Helsinki to work in the offices of Helsingin Jalkapalloklubi sports club (HJK). At the time, the club was considering the creation of a women's football club. In 1971, Salopuro became the first captain of the Helsingin Jalkapalloklubi women's team. Initially, none of the players were paid for their participation. From 1971 to 1975, she captained the team to five Finnish Football Championships. HJK also won the 1971 Finnish Women's Cup, defeating Vaasan Palloseura 6–0 in the final, which was reportedly attended by just two men who heckled the players.

Salopuro worked in the offices of HJK until 1976, when she moved to work for the Football Association of Finland. In the 1980s, she worked with the Finland women's national football team. Salopuro retired from the Finnish Football Association in 2003.

== Awards ==
In 2006, she was the first recipient of the Kaijan Kannu award for contributions to women's football. The award was named after Salopuro. In 2010, she was entered into the Finnish Football Hall of Fame. In 2012, she won the Finnish Pro Sports Medal. In 2013, she was inducted into HJK's Hall of Fame.
