= Pele Koljonen =

Finnish footballer (born 1988)

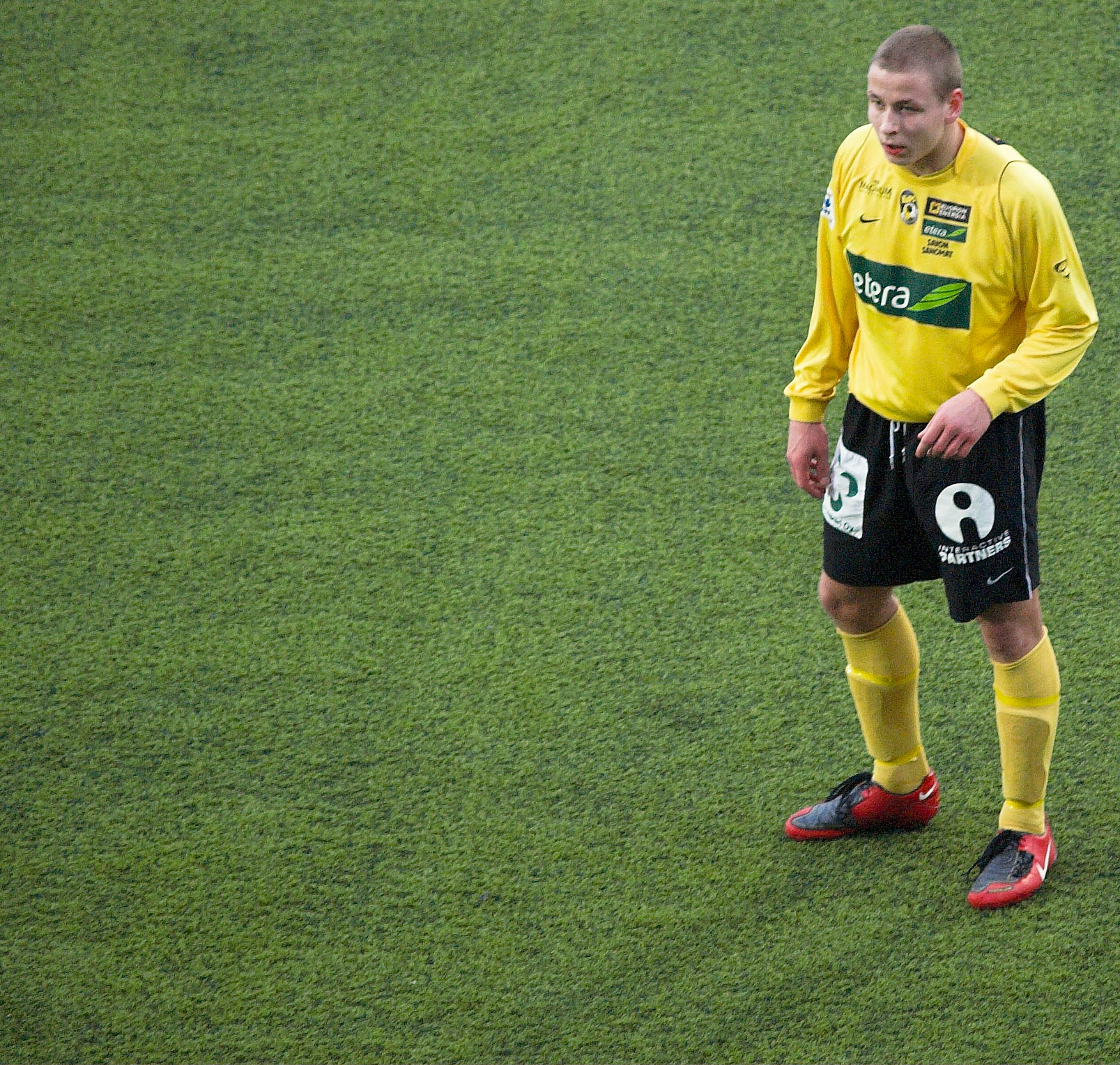
- Pele Koljonen in 2008

Personal information
- Date of birth: 25 July 1988 (age 38)
- Place of birth: Kuopio, Finland
- Height: 1.82 m (5 ft 11 1/2 in)
- Position: Striker

Senior career*
Years	Team	Apps	(Gls)
2006–2009	KuPS	77	(19)
2010–2011	MYPA	12	(3)

International career^{‡}
2009	Finland U-21	1	(0)
- * Club domestic league appearances and goals as of 12 July 2010 ‡ National team caps and goals as of 21 November 2009

Pele Koljonen (born 25 July 1988) is a retired Finnish footballer. He played in the Finnish premier division Veikkausliiga for KuPS and MYPA.

Koljonen is the son of former Finnish international Atik Ismail.
