= Olli Heinonen (footballer) =

Finnish footballer (born 1937)

Personal information
- Date of birth: 7 January 1937 (age 89)
- Position: Half-back

Senior career*
Years	Team	Apps	(Gls)
1956	Reipas Lahti		
1957–1958	Ilves-Kissat	35	(8)
1959–1966	Reipas Lahti		(22)

International career
1957–1965	Finland	28	(0)
- * Club domestic league appearances and goals

Olli Heinonen (born 7 January 1937) is a Finnish former footballer who played as a half-back. He made 28 appearances for the Finland national team from 1957 to 1965. He played for Ilves-Kissat and Reipas Lahti. He was Finnish Footballer of the Year twice in 1961 and 1963.
