= Seppo Kilponen =

Finnish footballer (born 1941)

Personal information
- Date of birth: 20 September 1941 (age 85)
- Position: Defender

Senior career*
Years	Team	Apps	(Gls)
1963–1964	OPS		
1965	HIFK	0	(0)
1965–1970	OPS		(13)
1971–1977	OTP		(5)

International career
1966–1971	Finland	31	(0)
- * Club domestic league appearances and goals

Seppo Kilponen (born 20 September 1941) is a Finnish former footballer who played as a defender. He made 27 appearances for the Finland national team from 1966 to 1971.

In his club career he played for OPS and OTP.
