= Matti Jokinen (footballer) =

Finnish footballer (1928–1999)

Personal information
- Date of birth: 8 November 1928
- Date of death: 9 August 1999 (aged 70)
- Position: Goalkeeper

Senior career*
Years	Team	Apps	(Gls)
1953–1955	VIFK Vaasa	5	
1957	IF Drott	2	

International career
1953–1957	Finland	7	(0)
- * Club domestic league appearances and goals

Matti Jokinen (8 November 1928 – 9 August 1999) was a Finnish footballer who played as a goalkeeper. He made seven appearances for the Finland national team from 1953 to 1957. He was also part of Finland's team for their qualification matches for the 1954 FIFA World Cup. Jokinen died on 9 August 1999, at the age of 70.
