= Pasi Rautiainen =

Finnish footballer and manager (born 1961)

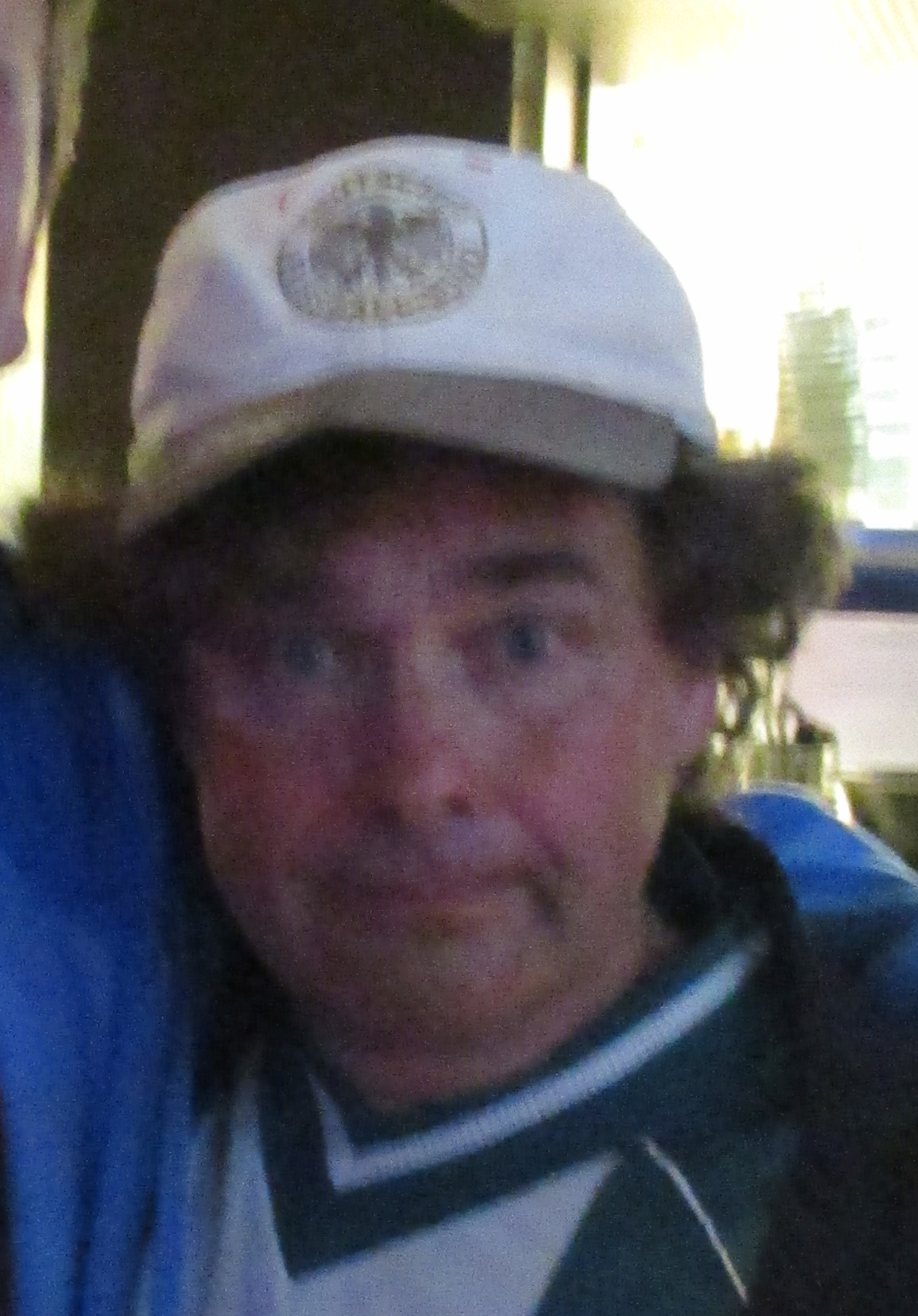
- Rautiainen in 2016

Personal information
- Full name: Pasi Pentti Rautiainen
- Date of birth: 18 July 1961 (age 65)
- Place of birth: Helsinki, Finland
- Height: 1.70 m (5 ft 7 in)
- Position: Midfielder

Youth career
- PK-35
- HPS
- HJK

Senior career*
Years	Team	Apps	(Gls)
1978–1979	HJK	49	(9)
1980–1981	Bayern Munich	1	(0)
1981–1982	Werder Bremen	41	(2)
1982–1986	Arminia Bielefeld	113	(16)
1986–1987	Locarno	14	(0)
1987–1989	SG Wattenscheid 09	13	(0)
1989–1993	HJK	58	(13)

International career
1979–1987	Finland	29	(1)

Managerial career
- 1994–1998: PK-35
- 1999–2000: Jokerit
- 2001: KooTeePee
- 2001–2002: Levadia Maardu
- 2002–2003: Jokerit
- 2006–2008: Flora
- 2008–2010: TPS
- * Club domestic league appearances and goals

Pasi Pentti Rautiainen (born 18 July 1961) is a Finnish football manager and former player. He made 29 appearances for Finland national football team, scoring one goal. Rautiainen was named in the Finnish Football Hall of Fame in 2021.

== Playing career ==
Rautiainen was very talented as a young player, and he joined Bayern Munich at the age of just 18 in 1980. He only made one appearance for the club, but was still named German champion with Bayern in the 1980–81 season. Rautiainen later made 115 appearances in the Bundesliga for Werder Bremen (1981–82) and Arminia Bielefeld (1982–1985), scoring 14 goals. He also played in the 2. Bundesliga for Bielefeld and SG Wattenscheid 09. In Finland Rautiainen played for HJK Helsinki, winning the Finnish championship in 1978 and 1990. He also earned 25 caps for the Finland national football team, scoring once. 1982 the sports journalists of his home country elected him Finnish Footballer of the Year.

== Managerial career ==
Rautiainen started coaching the first team of his former youth club PK-35 in 1994. He helped the club to win back-to-back promotions to Veikkausliiga for the 1998 season. He has also coached Jokerit and KooTeePee in Finland, and Levadia and Flora in Estonia. His last club was Turun Palloseura (TPS).

== Later career ==
Rautiainen is also a popular football pundit in Finland. He's known for his energetic and enthusiastic behavior when talking about anything concerning football. He commented UEFA Champions League games for the TV channel Nelonen. In the 2003–04 season, he promised he'd walk from Helsinki to Porvoo (some 50 kilometres) if Deportivo were able to knock A.C. Milan out in the quarter finals which indeed happened. He never wore socks even when live on TV. He was also featured on the broadcasts of Estonian channel ETV during the 2006 World Cup. Now he works as a studio commentator in Finland's national team matches. He also continues to work as studio commentator for Champions League and English Premier League broadcasts for Viaplay.

== Personal life ==
His father Pentti Rautiainen and sister Jutta are former footballers and managers.

== Career statistics ==
=== Club ===
Appearances and goals by club, season and competition
Club	Season	League			Domestic Cups (Note: Includes Suomen Cup, DFB-Pokal and Swiss Cup)		Europe		Total	
Club	Season	Division	Apps	Goals	Apps	Goals	Apps	Goals	Apps	Goals
HJK	1978	Mestaruussarja			–		–			
HJK	1979	Mestaruussarja					1 (Note: Includes European Cup)	1		
HJK	1980	Mestaruussarja								
HJK	Total		49	9	0	0	1	1	50	10
Bayern Munich	1980–81	Bundesliga	1	0	0	0	–		1	0
Werder Bremen	1980–81	2. Bundesliga Nord	15	1	–		–		15	1
Werder Bremen	1981–82	Bundesliga	26	1	4	0	5 (Note: Includes UEFA Intertoto Cup)	2	35	3
Werder Bremen	Total		41	2	4	0	5	2	50	4
Arminia Bielefeld	1982–83	Bundesliga	33	4	4	1	4	0	51	5
Arminia Bielefeld	1983–84	Bundesliga	27	1	2	0	6	4	35	5
Arminia Bielefeld	1984–85	Bundesliga	31	8	1	0	–		32	8
Arminia Bielefeld	1985–86	2. Bundesliga	24	3	0	0	4	3	28	6
Arminia Bielefeld	Total		115	16	7	1	14	7	136	24
FC Locarno	1986–87	Swiss Nationalliga A	14	0	1	0	1	0	16	0
SG Wattenscheid 09	1987–88	2. Bundesliga	7	0	–		–		7	0
SG Wattenscheid 09	1988–89	2. Bundesliga	6	0	–		–		6	0
SG Wattenscheid 09	Total		13	0	0	0	0	0	13	0
HJK	1990	Veikkausliiga	29	9	0	0	2	0	31	9
HJK	1991	Veikkausliiga	12	3	0	0	1	0	13	3
HJK	1994	Veikkausliiga	4	0	0	0	0	0	4	0
HJK	Total		45	12	0	0	3	0	48	12
Career total			276	39	12	1	24	10	312	51

=== International goals ===
As of match played 26 October 1979. Finland score listed first, score column indicates score after each Rautiainen goal.

List of international goals scored by Pasi Rautiainen
No.	Date	Venue	Opponent	Score	Result	Competition
1	26 October 1979	Stavanger Stadion, Stavanger, Norway	Norway	1–1	1–1	Friendly

== Honours ==
Individual

- Veikkausliiga Coach of the Month: July 2009
