= Seppo Pyykkö =

Finnish footballer (born 1955)

Personal information
- Date of birth: 24 December 1955 (age 70)
- Place of birth: Oulu, Finland
- Height: 1.76 m (5 ft 9 in)
- Position: Midfielder

Senior career*
Years	Team	Apps	(Gls)
1973–1980	OPS Oulu	165	(47)
1979–1980	Houston Summit (indoor)	9	(5)
1980–1982	Bayer Uerdingen	10	(0)
1982–1984	OPS Oulu	67	(9)
1985–1986	OTP	13	(3)

International career
1976–1981	Finland	30	(1)
- * Club domestic league appearances and goals

Seppo Pyykkö (born 24 December 1955) is a Finnish retired professional footballer who played for clubs in Finland, Germany and United States.

== Honours ==
OPS Oulu

- Mestaruussarja: 1979

Individual

- Finnish Footballer of the Year: 1979
