= Atik Ismail =

Finnish footballer (born 1957)

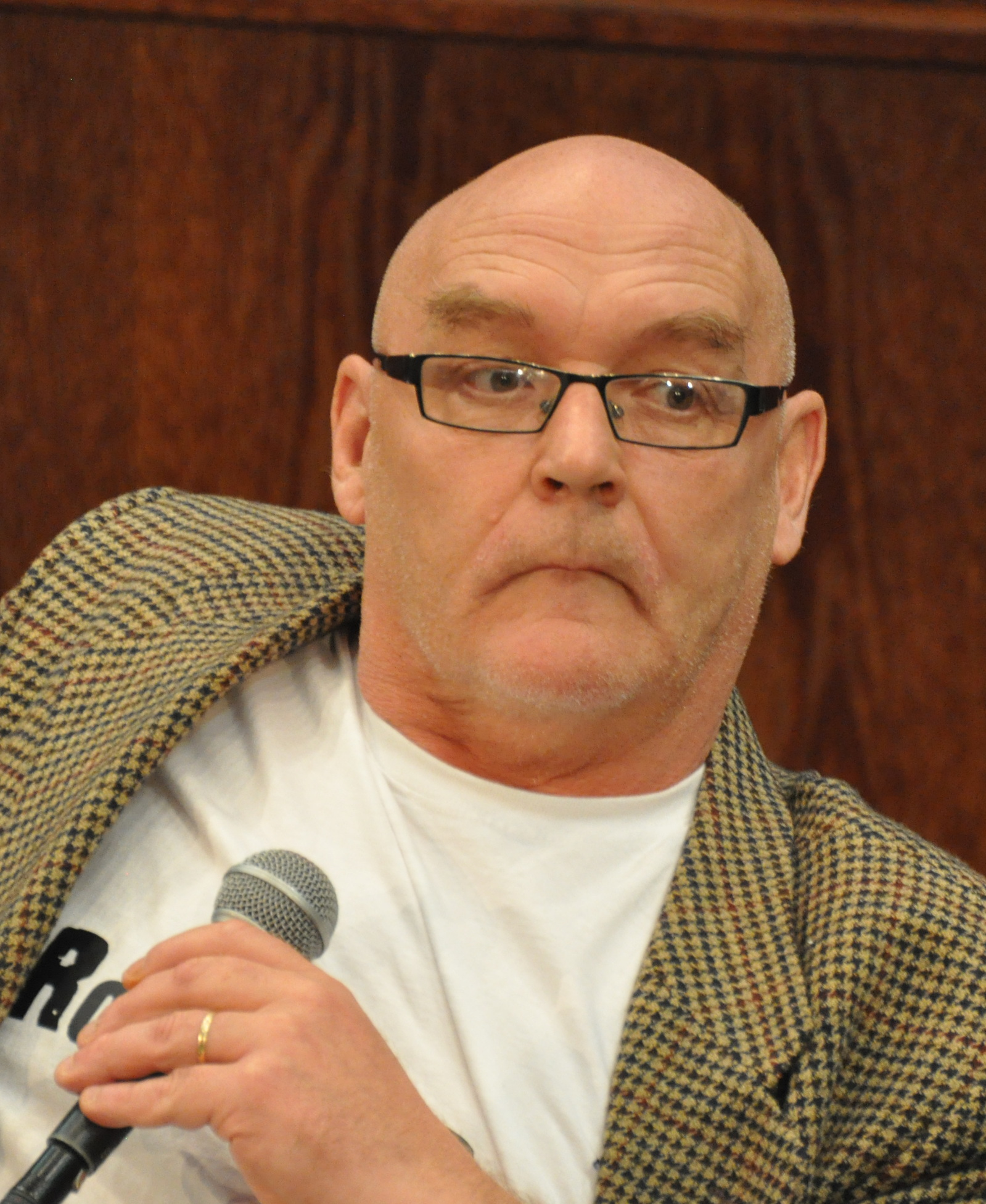
- Ismail in 2015

Personal information
- Date of birth: 5 January 1957 (age 69)
- Place of birth: Helsinki, Finland
- Position: Forward

Senior career*
Years	Team	Apps	(Gls)
1975–1976	HJK	20	(9)
1977	Kiffen	19	(14)
1978	HJK	21	(18)
1978–1979	Beşiktaş	16	(6)
1979	HJK	27	(15)
1979–1980	Waregem	2	(0)
1980	AIK	9	(2)
1981–1984	HJK	97	(55)
1985	Apollo	–	(11)
1986–1987	Koparit	17	(1)
Total		228	(131)

International career
1978–1983	Finland	26	(7)
- * Club domestic league appearances and goals

Atik Ismail (born 5 January 1957) is a Finnish former footballer who played as a forward. He made 26 appearances in the Finland national team scoring 7 goals. Ismail was the top scorer of Finnish premier division Mestaruussarja in 1978, 1979 and 1982. In 1978, he was nominated as the Finnish Footballer of the Year. Ismail also played abroad, for example in Turkey and Belgium. He was inducted into the Finnish Football Hall of Fame in 2008.

== Personal life ==
Atik Ismail was born to a Tatar family in Munkkiniemi, Helsinki. He and his twin brother Adil Ismail were named after Turkish wrestlers Celal Atik and Adil Atan. His brother is also a former footballer.

Children of Ismail are Can Heikkonen (b. 1982), twins Pele and Ali Koljonen (s. 1988) and Maria Koljonen (s. 1989). Sons Ali and Pele have also played football.

For decades Ismail suffered from alcoholism. He sobered completely in 1990 and has since worked with helping fellow recovering addicts. According to Ismail, his alcohol addiction switched to a gambling problem and he has had difficulty paying his debts from his small pension.

In addition to sports, Ismail has published his poetry, worked as a nurse and been involved in politics. He was a candidate to the European Parliament in the elections of 1999 (Green League) and 2009 (Left Alliance).

The Finnish press remembers Atik Ismail as a ”legendary footballer”, but also as someone who partly wasted his potential due to his alcoholism.
