= Mauno Rintanen =

Finnish footballer (1925-2000)

Personal information
- Date of birth: 28 April 1925
- Place of birth: Vaasa, Finland
- Date of death: 13 July 2000 (aged 75)
- Place of death: Espoo, Finland
- Position: Goalkeeper

Senior career*
Years	Team	Apps	(Gls)
1945-1952	VPS	124	(0)
1953-1955	HJK	46	(0)
1956-1957	Hull City	4	(0)

International career
1946–1954	Finland	7	(0)
- * Club domestic league appearances and goals

Mauno Rintanen (28 April 1925 – 13 July 2000) was a Finnish footballer. He played in seven matches for the Finland national football team from 1946 to 1954. He was also part of Finland's team at the 1952 Summer Olympics, and for their qualification matches for the 1954 FIFA World Cup.

He started his career at VPS before moving to HJK. In 1956 he became first ever Finnish footballer to play in English Football League when he signed an amateur contract for Hull City A.F.C. He made his debut in 17 October 1956 in a match against Bradford Park Avenue.
