= Marko Myyry =

Finnish footballer (born 1967)

Personal information
- Full name: Marko Olavi Myyry
- Date of birth: 15 November 1967 (age 58)
- Place of birth: Kerava, Finland
- Height: 1.61 m (5 ft 3 in)
- Position: Midfielder

Youth career
- 1975–1985: Keravan Pallo-75

Senior career*
Years	Team	Apps	(Gls)
1986–1987	Haka	40	(6)
1987–1989	Meppen	59	(14)
1989–1994	Lokeren	149	(25)
1994–2001	Meppen	190	(28)
2001–2003	Blau-Weiss Dörpen		

International career
1986–1996	Finland	60	(2)
- * Club domestic league appearances and goals

Marko Myyry (born 15 November 1967) is a Finnish former professional footballer who played as a midfielder.

== Career ==
Myyry joined 2. Bundesliga side SV Meppen in 1987. He would appear for the club in nearly 400 matches (175 matches in the 2. Bundesliga) over two spells from 1987 to 2001.

Myyry made several appearances in the Finland national team.

== Career statistics ==
Appearances and goals by club, season and competition
Club	Season	League			National cup (Note: Includes DFB-Pokal and Belgian Cup)		Europe		Total	
Club	Season	Division	Apps	Goals	Apps	Goals	Apps	Goals	Apps	Goals
Haka	1986	Mestaruussarja	22	5			2 (Note: Appearances in UEFA Cup Winners' Cup)	0	27	5
Haka	1987	Mestaruussarja	18	1			–		18	1
Haka	Total		40	6	0	0	2	0	42	6
Meppen	1987–88	2. Bundesliga	23	5	–		–		23	5
Meppen	1988–89	2. Bundesliga	36	9	1	0	–		37	9
Meppen	Total		59	14	1	0	0	0	60	14
Lokeren	1989–90	Belgian First Division	28	6	5	0	–		33	6
Lokeren	1990–91	Belgian First Division	31	6	5	1	–		36	7
Lokeren	1991–92	Belgian First Division	28	6	1	0	–		29	6
Lokeren	1992–93	Belgian First Division	33	4	1	0	–		34	4
Lokeren	1993–94	Belgian Second Division	36	4	4	2	–		40	6
Lokeren	Total		156	26	16	3	0	0	172	29
Meppen	1994–95	2. Bundesliga	32	2	1	0	–		33	2
Meppen	1995–96	2. Bundesliga	31	3	2	0	–		33	3
Meppen	1996–97	2. Bundesliga	31	4	3	0	–		34	4
Meppen	1997–98	2. Bundesliga	22	1	3	1	–		25	2
Meppen	1998–99	Regionalliga Nord	26	2	1	0	–		27	2
Meppen	1999–2000	Regionalliga Nord	18	2	2	0	–		20	2
Meppen	2000–01	Oberliga Niedersachsen/Bremen	30	14	–		–		30	14
Meppen	Total		190	28	12	1	0	0	202	29
Career total			445	74	29	4	2	0	476	76
