= Tommi Kautonen =

Finnish footballer and manager (born 1971)

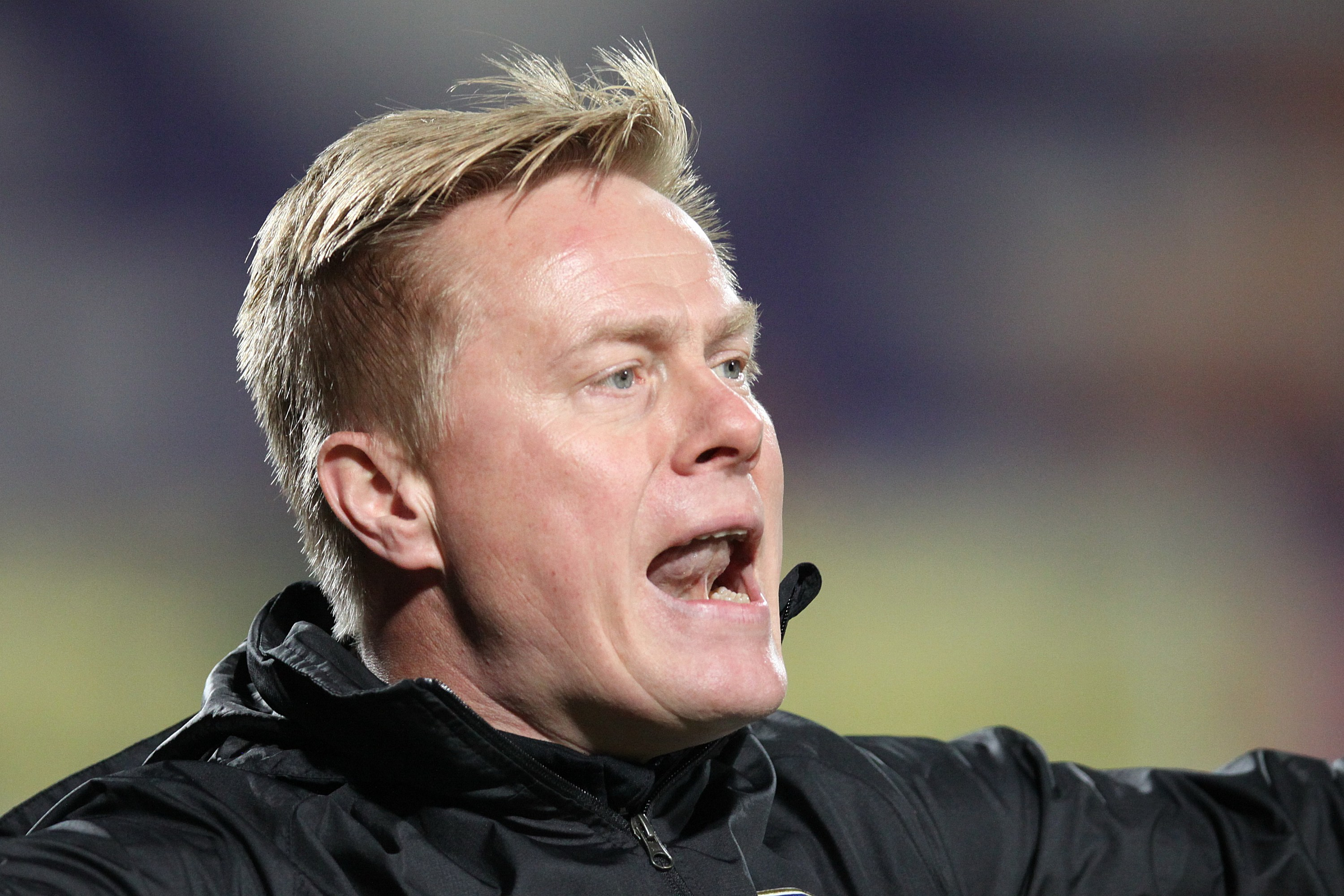
- Kautonen as head coach of Finland U21 in 2015

Personal information
- Full name: Tommi Tapani Kautonen
- Date of birth: 24 December 1971 (age 54)
- Place of birth: Lahti, Finland
- Height: 1.74 m (5 ft 9 in)
- Position: Defensive midfielder

Team information
- Current team: Reipas Lahti (manager)

Youth career
- 1982–1989: Reipas Lahti

Senior career*
| Years | Team | Apps | (Gls) |
| 1989–1992 | Reipas Lahti | 72 | (3) |
| 1992–1994 | Haka | 32 | (0) |
| 1994 | → VaKP (loan) | 6 | (0) |
| 1994 | → KajHa (loan) | 1 | (0) |
| 1994 | → BK-IFK (loan) | 4 | (0) |
| 1994 | → Reipas Lahti (loan) | 8 | (0) |
| 1995–1998 | MYPA | 81 | (1) |
| 1999–2002 | VPS | 109 | (6) |
| 2003–2006 | Lahti | 99 | (14) |
| Total | | 407 | (25) |

International career
| 1987 | Finland U15 | 9 | (0) |
| 1988 | Finland U16 | 9 | (0) |
| 1988–1989 | Finland U17 | 8 | (0) |
| 1990 | Finland U19 | 1 | (0) |
| 1992–1993 | Finland U21 | 9 | (1) |
| 1998–2001 | Finland | 9 | (0) |

Managerial career
- 2004–2007: Reipas Lahti (youth)
- 2008: KooTeePee
- 2009: VIFK (assistant)
- 2010: Jaro (assistant)
- 2010: JBK
- 2011–2013: Lahti
- 2014–2017: Finland U21
- 2017–2018: SJK
- 2021–: Reipas Lahti
- * Club domestic league appearances and goals

Tommi "Auge" Kautonen (born 24 December 1971 in Lahti, Finland) is a Finnish football manager and former player who is the head coach of Reipas Lahti.

As a player Kautonen played as a midfielder for Reipas Lahti, FC Haka, MyPa, Vaasan Palloseura (known then as VPS Vaasa) and FC Lahti. He is the only player who played in every Veikkausliiga season since its beginning to the season 2006. Kautonen made his debut in highest tier on 1 October 1989 in a match between Reipas and Kemin Palloseura. He ended his career in match between FC Lahti and KooTeePee on 29 October 2006. Kautonen played total of 377 league matches and scored 21 goals. In 1999, he won the Finnish League Cup with Vaasan Palloseura. In 2004, he was chosen the best midfielder in Veikkausliiga. Kautonen has nine caps in the Finland national team. He has also appeared in 27 youth internationals.

Kautonen's brothers Turo, Mikko and Olli are also former league football players, as well as his father Timo. Kautonen is a childhood friend of national team captain Jari Litmanen. His nickname "Auge" refers to Klaus Augenthaler while his former playmate Litmanen is known in similar fashion as "Litti" after Pierre Littbarski.

== Honours ==
Individual

- Veikkausliiga Coach of the Month: September 2012
