= Maija Liukkonen =

Finnish footballer

Personal information
- Date of birth: 24 October 1956 (age 70)
- Position: Midfielder

International career
Years	Team	Apps	(Gls)
1980–1991	Finland	52	

Maija Liukkonen (born; October 24, 1956) is a retired Finnish footballer.

== Football career ==
She earned 52 caps at international level between 1980 and 1991. At club level Liukkonen played for TPS and HJK.
