= Jutta Rautiainen =

Finnish association football player

Personal information
- Date of birth: 11 July 1963 (age 63)
- Position: Midfielder

International career
Years	Team	Apps	(Gls)
1981-1990	Finland	13	(2)

Managerial career
- 2010–2012: HJK

Jutta Rautiainen (born 11 July 1964) is a retired Finnish football player.

Since retiring Rautianien has taken up football coaching teams including HJK.

== Personal life ==
Rautiainen is the daughter of footballer Pentti Rautiainen and her brother is footballer Pasi Rautiainen.
