= Miikka Toivola =

Finnish footballer (1949-2017)

Personal information
- Date of birth: 11 July 1949
- Place of birth: Porin maalaiskunta, Finland
- Date of death: 26 January 2017 (aged 67)
- Position: Midfielder

Senior career*
Years	Team	Apps	(Gls)
–1968	PTU		
1969–1972	TPS	79	(25)
1973–1980	HJK Helsinki	176	(45)

International career
1968–1980	Finland	62	(4)

Managerial career
- 1982: HJK Helsinki
- * Club domestic league appearances and goals

Miikka Toivola (11 July 1949 – 26 January 2017) was a Finnish footballer.

== Football career ==
He earned 62 caps at international level between 1967 and 1980, scoring 4 goals.

At club level Toivola played for PTU, TPS and HJK.

== Honours ==
- Finnish Championship: 1971, 1972, 1973, 1978
- Finnish Footballer of the Year: 1972, 1978
