= László Szokolai =

Hungarian footballer (born 1952)

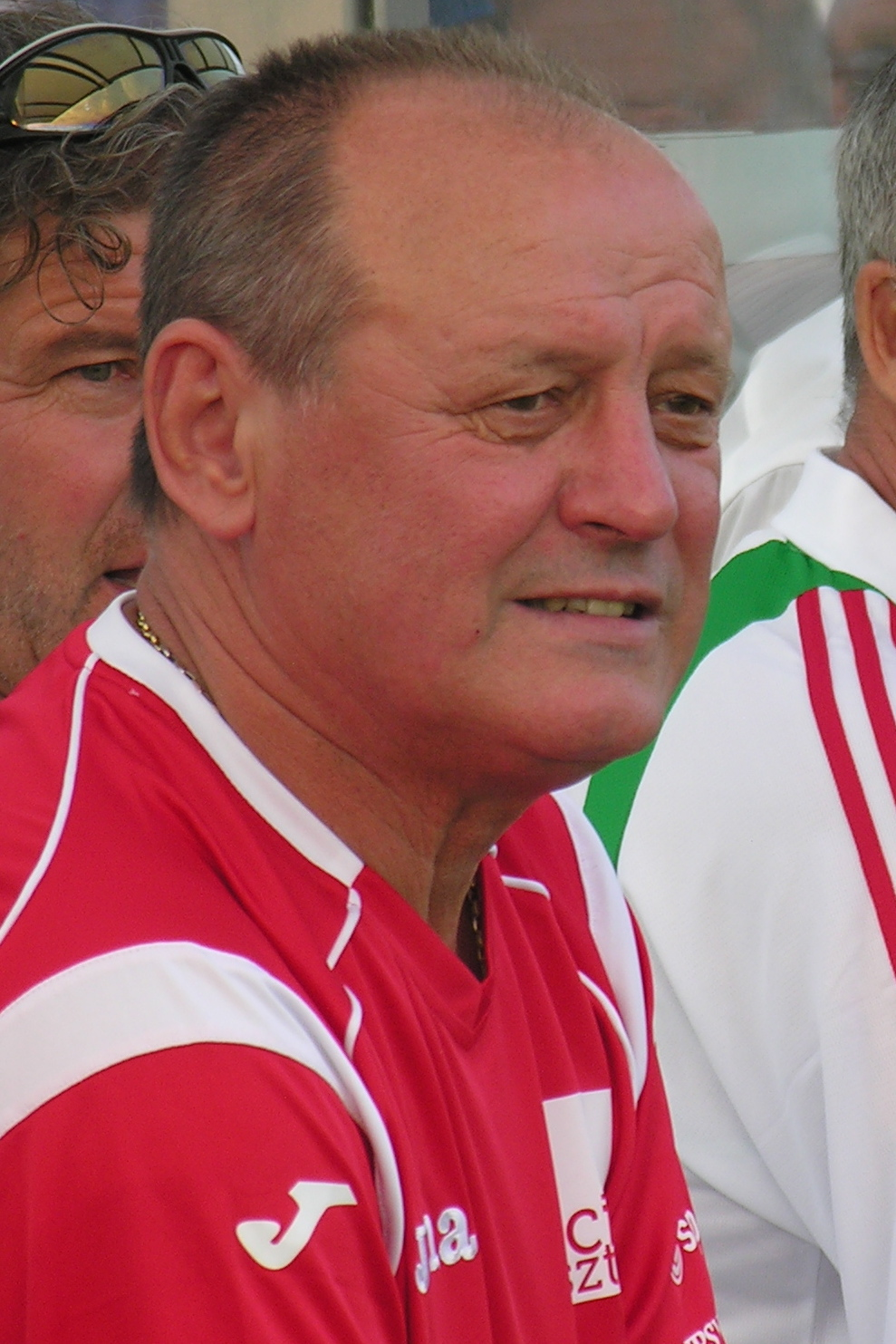
- Szokolai in 2011.

Personal information
- Date of birth: 25 March 1952 (age 74)
- Place of birth: Budapest, Hungary
- Height: 1.74 m (5 ft 9 in)
- Position: Forward

Senior career*
Years	Team	Apps	(Gls)
1973–1974	Veszprém		
1974–1977	Rába ETO Győr	77	(23)
1977–1983	Ferencváros	157	(74)
1983–1986	Sturm Graz	78	(21)
1986–1987	Volán		

International career
1978–1985	Hungary	12	(2)

Managerial career
- 1991–1992: Ganz Danubius
- 1992: Rákospalota
- * Club domestic league appearances and goals

László Szokolai (born 25 March 1952) is a Hungarian retired football manager and former professional player who played as a forward.

== Managerial career ==
On 2 October 1991, Szokolai was announced as the new head coach of Nemzeti Bajnokság II club Ganz Danubius. After a weak first half of the season, Rákospalota took over the team's second division membership, with Szokolai remaining as coach on 17 January 1992. On 28 May 1992, he was relieved of his duties as head coach after REAC's relegation from the second division had become mathematically certain, with assistant coach Sándor Szabó succeeding him.

== Honours ==
Ferencváros

- Nemzeti Bajnokság I: 1980–81
- Magyar Kupa: 1977–78
