= László Tieber =

Hungarian footballer (born 1949)

Personal information
- Date of birth: 30 August 1949 (age 77)
- Place of birth: Sárszentmihály, Hungary
- Position: Forward

Senior career*
| Years | Team | Apps | (Gls) |
| 1968–1970 | Székesfehérvári MÁV Előre SC | | |
| 1970–1971 | Budapest Honvéd | 4 | (0) |
| 1971–1982 | Videoton FC | 221 | (78) |
| 1982–1987 | Siófoki Bányász | | |
| 1987–1990 | USC Kirschschlag | | |

International career^{‡}
| 1978–1979 | Hungary | 2 | (2) |
- * Club domestic league appearances and goals as of 13 September 2017 (UTC) ‡ National team caps and goals as of 13 September 2017 (UTC)

László Tieber (born 30 August 1949) is a retired Hungarian footballer. During his club career, Tieber played for Székesfehérvári MÁV Előre SC, Budapest Honvéd, Videoton FC, Siófoki Bányász and USC Kirschschlag. He made 2 appearances for the Hungary national team, scoring 2 goals.
