= Reipas Lahti =

Finnish sports club

- Full name: Lahden Reipas
- Founded: 1891; 135 years ago
- Ground: Lahden kisapuisto, Lahti
- Capacity: 4,000
- Manager: Tommi Kautonen
- League: Kakkonen
- 2026: Kakkonen Group A, 7th of 10
| Home colours | Away colours |

Location of Viipuri and Lahti within the 1812–1940 borders

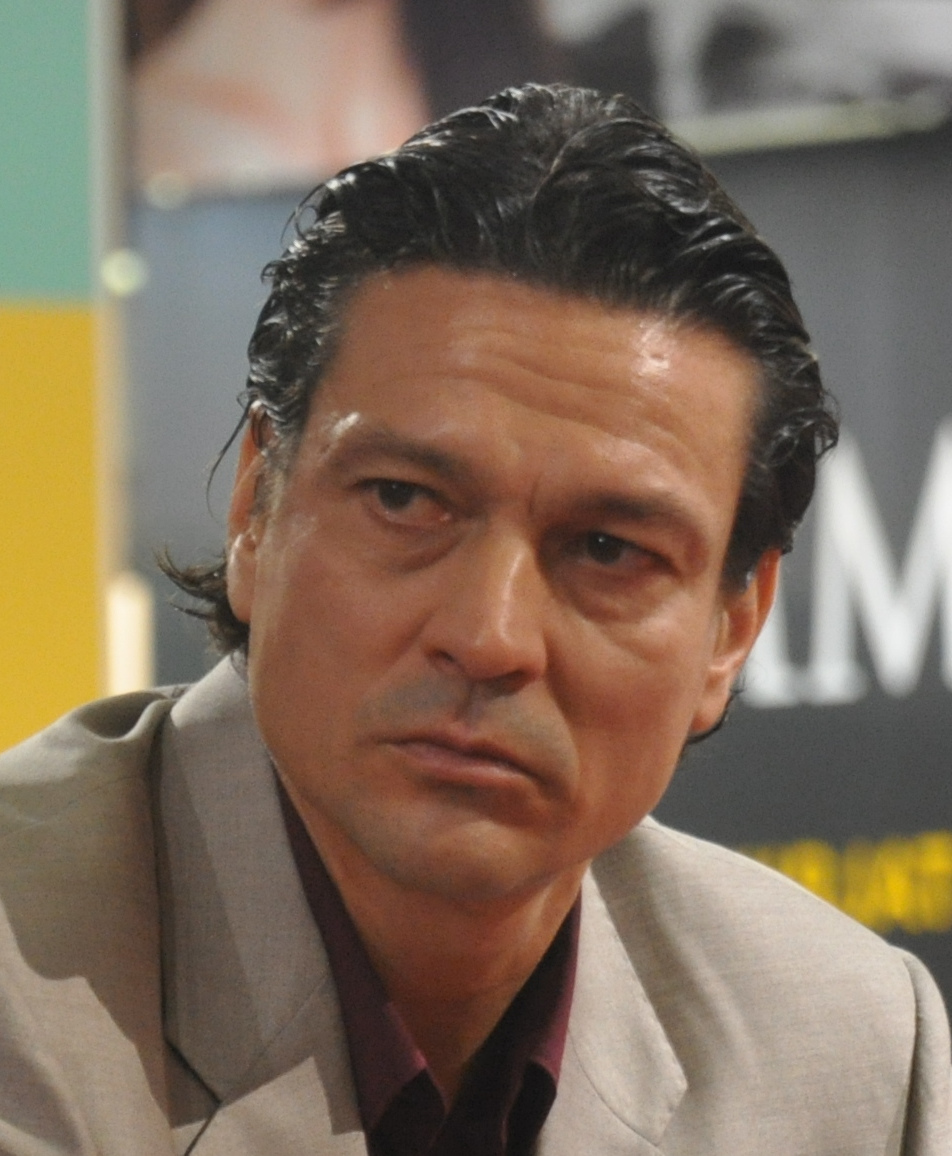
Jari Litmanen, Reipas's greatest ever player, made his Mestaruussarja debut in 1987, aged 16. Three years later, he transferred to HJK.

Reipas Lahti is a sports club based in Lahti, Finland. It is involved in various of ball games and also other sports. The club emerged in the late 1940s, when the inhabitants of Viipuri had mostly been relocated in Lahti, after evacuation during World War II. As a consequence, the activities of Viipurin Reipas, which had been founded in 1891, were continued in the new home town of the evacuees. The name of the club was still Reipas Viipuri until 1962, when the ball game section became simply Reipas.

Reipas has played in top-flight football, ice hockey and bandy, with particular success in football.

In bandy, Reipas last appeared in top flight in 1967, but then discontinued its involvement in this sport the following year. In 1975, the football and ice hockey sections became independent clubs, football being continued under the name of Lahden Reipas, and ice hockey under the name of Kiekkoreipas, who now play as Pelicans.

== Football ==
The hallmark of Reipas in football is a shirt with vertical orange and black stripes.

From 1963 to 1970, Reipas won the Mestaruussarja three time, thus achieving a hat trick of Finnish championships. However, by 1996 the club was in financial difficulties, and the problem was solved by merging Reipas and they more recently arrived local rival Kuusysi. At the time both clubs played in the northern section of the second-tier Ykkönen, but at the end of the season Reipas found themselves in the relegation zone.

=== FC Lahti ===
The new club was simply called FC Lahti, and it inherited Kuusysi's place in Ykkönen. The divisional position and the league license of Reipas, in 1997 Kakkonen, was given to FC Pallo-Lahti, which was founded as a reserves team. Later this team was discontinued and the place in the division in question was given up.

=== FC Reipas ===
Together with the other changes, a club named FC Reipas was founded in 1996. Its task is to continue the tradition of bringing up new generations of footballers in Lahti, more specifically U15–U18 players. Nowadays the club has teams in all age groups.

The club also has an elderly men's team.

The club organises the annual Lahti Soccer tournament.

=== Return of Reipas Lahti ===
Lahden Reipas, i.e. Reipas Lahti returned to men's competitive football for the season 2012, when it was given the former place of Reipas Salpausselkä in Kolmonen.

In 2024, Reipas signed a deal with FC Lahti to function as their reserve team. In 2025 the two clubs faced each other in the Finnish Cup, and Reipas surprisingly beat FC Lahti 2-1 to advance in the tournament.

=== Season to season ===
Season to season of Reipas

| Season | Level | Division | Section | Administration | Position | Movements |
|---|---|---|---|---|---|---|
| 1931 | Tier 2 | B-Sarja (Second Division) | | Finnish FA (Suomen Palloliitto) | 3rd | |
| 1932 | Tier 2 | B-Sarja (Second Division) | | Finnish FA (Suomen Palloliitto) | 4th | |
| 1933 | Tier 2 | B-Sarja (Second Division) | | Finnish FA (Suomen Palloliitto) | 4th | |
| 1934 | Tier 2 | B-Sarja (Second Division) | East Group | Finnish FA (Suomen Palloliitto) | 2nd | Promotion Group 4th |
| 1935 | Tier 2 | B-Sarja (Second Division) | East Group | Finnish FA (Suomen Palloliitto) | 4th | |
| 1936 | Tier 2 | Itä-Länsi-Sarja (Second Division) | East League | Finnish FA (Suomen Palloliitto) | 2nd | Promotion Group 4th |
| 1937 | Tier 2 | Itä-Länsi-Sarja (Second Division) | East League | Finnish FA (Suomen Palloliitto) | 2nd | |
| 1938 | Tier 2 | Itä-Länsi-Sarja (Second Division) | East League, South Group | Finnish FA (Suomen Palloliitto) | 1st | Promotion Playoff – Promoted |
| 1939 | Tier 1 | Mestaruussarja (Premier League) | | Finnish FA (Suomen Palloliitto) | 8th | Relegated |
| 1940–1944 | | | | | | Wartime – activity ceased |
| 1945–46 | Tier 3 | SPL Maakuntasarja (Third Division) | Kymenlaakso North Group | Finnish FA (Suomen Pallolitto) | 2nd | first season in Lahti |
| 1946–47 | Tier 3 | SPL Maakuntasarja (Third Division) | Häme East Group | Finnish FA (Suomen Pallolitto) | 1st | Promotion Playoff |
| 1947–48 | Tier 3 | SPL Maakuntasarja (Third Division) | Häme East Group | Finnish FA (Suomen Pallolitto) | 1st | Promotion Playoff |
| 1948 | Tier 3 | Maakuntasarja (Third Division) | South Group A | Finnish FA (Suomen Pallolitto) | 1st | Promotion Playoff |
| 1949 | Tier 3 | Maakuntasarja (Third Division) | South Group A | Finnish FA (Suomen Pallolitto) | 2nd | Promotion Playoff – Promoted |
| 1950 | Tier 2 | Suomensarja (Second Division) | East Group | Finnish FA (Suomen Palloliitto) | 10th | Relegated |
| 1951 | Tier 3 | Maakuntasarja (Third Division) | South Group B | Finnish FA (Suomen Pallolitto) | 5th | |
| 1952 | Tier 3 | Maakuntasarja (Third Division) | South Group B | Finnish FA (Suomen Pallolitto) | 3rd | |
| 1953 | Tier 3 | Maakuntasarja (Third Division) | South Group B | Finnish FA (Suomen Pallolitto) | 2nd | |
| 1954 | Tier 3 | Maakuntasarja (Third Division) | Central Group IV | Finnish FA (Suomen Pallolitto) | 1st | Promotion Group East 6th |
| 1955 | Tier 3 | Maakuntasarja (Third Division) | West Group 2 | Finnish FA (Suomen Pallolitto) | 5th | |
| 1956 | Tier 3 | Maakuntasarja (Third Division) | South Group II | Finnish FA (Suomen Pallolitto) | 3rd | |
| 1957 | Tier 3 | Maakuntasarja (Third Division) | South Group II | Finnish FA (Suomen Pallolitto) | 3rd | |
| 1958 | Tier 3 | Maakuntasarja (Third Division) | South Group II – South East Finland | Finnish FA (Suomen Pallolitto) | 4th | |
| 1959 | Tier 3 | Maakuntasarja (Third Division) | Group 2 Uusimaa | Finnish FA (Suomen Pallolitto) | 1st | Promoted |
| 1960 | Tier 2 | Suomensarja (Second Division) | East Group | Finnish FA (Suomen Palloliitto) | 1st | Promoted |
| 1961 | Tier 1 | Mestaruussarja (Premier League) | | Finnish FA (Suomen Palloliitto) | 5th | |
| 1962 | Tier 1 | Mestaruussarja (Premier League) | | Finnish FA (Suomen Palloliitto) | 2nd | |
| 1963 | Tier 1 | Mestaruussarja (Premier League) | | Finnish FA (Suomen Palloliitto) | 1st | Champions |
| 1964 | Tier 1 | Mestaruussarja (Premier League) | | Finnish FA (Suomen Palloliitto) | 5th | |
| 1965 | Tier 1 | Mestaruussarja (Premier League) | | Finnish FA (Suomen Palloliitto) | 3rd | |
| 1966 | Tier 1 | Mestaruussarja (Premier League) | | Finnish FA (Suomen Palloliitto) | 5th | |
| 1967 | Tier 1 | Mestaruussarja (Premier League) | | Finnish FA (Suomen Palloliitto) | 5th | Champions |
| 1968 | Tier 1 | Mestaruussarja (Premier League) | | Finnish FA (Suomen Palloliitto) | 2nd | |
| 1969 | Tier 1 | Mestaruussarja (Premier League) | | Finnish FA (Suomen Palloliitto) | 4th | |
| 1970 | Tier 1 | Mestaruussarja (Premier League) | | Finnish FA (Suomen Palloliitto) | 1st | Champions |
| 1971 | Tier 1 | Mestaruussarja (Premier League) | | Finnish FA (Suomen Palloliitto) | 9th | |
| 1972 | Tier 1 | Mestaruussarja (Premier League) | | Finnish FA (Suomen Palloliitto) | 3rd | |
| 1973 | Tier 1 | Mestaruussarja (Premier League) | | Finnish FA (Suomen Palloliitto) | 3rd | |
| 1974 | Tier 1 | Mestaruussarja (Premier League) | | Finnish FA (Suomen Palloliitto) | 2nd | |
| 1975 | Tier 1 | Mestaruussarja (Premier League) | | Finnish FA (Suomen Palloliitto) | 6th | |
| 1976 | Tier 1 | Mestaruussarja (Premier League) | | Finnish FA (Suomen Palloliitto) | 4th | |
| 1977 | Tier 1 | Mestaruussarja (Premier League) | | Finnish FA (Suomen Palloliitto) | 5th | |
| 1978 | Tier 1 | Mestaruussarja (Premier League) | | Finnish FA (Suomen Palloliitto) | 9th | |
| 1979 | Tier 1 | Mestaruussarja (Premier League) | | Finnish FA (Suomen Palloliitto) | 4th | Championship Group 5th |
| 1980 | Tier 1 | Mestaruussarja (Premier League) | | Finnish FA (Suomen Palloliitto) | 10th | Relegation Group 8th – Relegated |
| 1981 | Tier 2 | I Divisioona (First Division) | | Finnish FA (Suomen Palloliitto) | 6th | Relegation Group 2nd |
| 1982 | Tier 2 | I Divisioona (First Division) | | Finnish FA (Suomen Palloliitto) | 1st | Promotion Group 2nd – Promoted |
| 1983 | Tier 1 | Mestaruussarja (Premier League) | | Finnish FA (Suomen Palloliitto) | 11th | Relegation Group 7th – Relegated |
| 1984 | Tier 2 | I Divisioona (First Division) | | Finnish FA (Suomen Palloliitto) | 5th | |
| 1985 | Tier 2 | I Divisioona (First Division) | | Finnish FA (Suomen Palloliitto) | 2nd | Promotion Playoff |
| 1986 | Tier 2 | I Divisioona (First Division) | | Finnish FA (Suomen Palloliitto) | 1st | Promoted |
| 1987 | Tier 1 | Mestaruussarja (Premier League) | | Finnish FA (Suomen Palloliitto) | 10th | |
| 1988 | Tier 1 | Mestaruussarja (Premier League) | | Finnish FA (Suomen Palloliitto) | 3rd | Championship Group 4th |
| 1989 | Tier 1 | Mestaruussarja (Premier League) | | Finnish FA (Suomen Palloliitto) | 8th | Relegation Group 2nd |
| 1990 | Tier 1 | Futisliiga (Premier League) | | Finnish FA (Suomen Palloliitto) | 5th | |
| 1991 | Tier 1 | Futisliiga (Premier League) | | Finnish FA (Suomen Palloliitto) | 12th | Relegated |
| 1992 | Tier 2 | I Divisioona (First Division) | | Finnish FA (Suomen Palloliitto) | 12th | Relegated |
| 1993 | Tier 3 | Kakkonen (Second Division) | East Group | Finnish FA (Suomen Pallolitto) | 2nd | Promoted |
| 1994 | Tier 2 | Ykkönen (First Division) | | Finnish FA (Suomen Palloliitto) | 4th | |
| 1995 | Tier 2 | Ykkönen (First Division) | | Finnish FA (Suomen Palloliitto) | 4th | |
| 1996 | Tier 2 | Ykkönen (First Division) | North Group | Finnish FA (Suomen Palloliitto) | 9th | Relegated – Merged with Kuusysi to form FC Lahti |
| 1997–2011 | | | | | | Only youth teams |
| 2012 | Tier 4 | Kolmonen (Third Division) | Group 3 | Helsinki & Uusimaa (SPL Uusimaa) | 3rd | |
| 2013 | Tier 4 | Kolmonen (Third Division) | Group 3 | Helsinki & Uusimaa (SPL Uusimaa) | 2nd | |
| 2014 | Tier 4 | Kolmonen (Third Division) | Group 3 | Helsinki & Uusimaa (SPL Uusimaa) | 3rd | |
| 2015 | Tier 4 | Kolmonen (Third Division) | Group 3 | Helsinki & Uusimaa (SPL Uusimaa) | 5th | |
| 2016 | Tier 4 | Kolmonen (Third Division) | Group 3 | Helsinki & Uusimaa (SPL Uusimaa) | 2nd | |
| 2017 | Tier 4 | Kolmonen (Third Division) | Group 3 | Helsinki & Uusimaa (SPL Uusimaa) | 3rd | |
| 2018 | Tier 4 | Kolmonen (Third Division) | Group 3 | Helsinki & Uusimaa (SPL Uusimaa) | 1st | Promoted |
| 2019 | Tier 3 | Kakkonen (Second Division) | Group A | Finnish FA (Suomen Pallolitto) | 6th | |
| 2020 | Tier 3 | Kakkonen (Second Division) | Group A | Finnish FA (Suomen Pallolitto) | 8th | |
| 2021 | Tier 3 | Kakkonen (Second Division) | Group A | Finnish FA (Suomen Pallolitto) | 4th | |
| 2022 | Tier 3 | Kakkonen (Second Division) | Group A | Finnish FA (Suomen Pallolitto) | 3rd | |
| 2023 | Tier 3 | Kakkonen (Second Division) | Group A | Finnish FA (Suomen Pallolitto) | 4th | |
| 2024 | Tier 4 | Kakkonen (Second Division) | Group A | Finnish FA (Suomen Pallolitto) | 1st | Promotion Playoff |
| 2025 | Tier 4 | Kakkonen (Second Division) | Group A | Finnish FA (Suomen Pallolitto) | 7th | |
| 2026 | Tier 4 | Kakkonen (Second Division) | Group A | Finnish FA (Suomen Pallolitto) | | |

- 27 seasons in Veikkausliiga
- 19 seasons in Ykkönen
- 16 seasons in Kakkonen
- 7 seasons in Kolmonen

== Honours in football ==
- Finnish champion (3):
  - 1963, 1967, 1970
- Finnish Cup (7):
  - 1964, 1972, 1973, 1974, 1975, 1976, 1978
- Finnish Cup runners-up (3):
  - 1963, 1967, 1970
