= 1959 in association football =

The following are the football (soccer) events of the year 1959 throughout the world.

== Events ==
- October 25 – Sparta Rotterdam makes a winning European debut by defeating Sweden's IFK Göteborg in the second round of the European Cup. All three goals for the Dutch side are scored by Joop Daniëls.

== Winners club national championship ==
- Argentina: San Lorenzo
- Brazil: Bahia
- Chile: Universidad de Chile
- France: OGC Nice
- Israel: Hapoel Petah Tikva F.C.
- Iceland: KR
- Italy: A.C. Milan
- Mexico: Chivas Guadalajara
- Netherlands: Sparta Rotterdam
- Paraguay: Olimpia Asunción
- Scotland: Rangers
- Soviet Union: FC Dynamo Moscow
- Spain: Barcelona
- Turkey: Fenerbahçe
- West Germany: Eintracht Frankfurt

== International tournaments ==
- 1959 British Home Championship (October 4, 1958 – April 11, 1959)

Shared by England and Northern Ireland

- African Cup of Nations in Egypt (May 22 – 29 1959)
  1. Egypt
  2. Sudan
  3. Ethiopia
- Pan American Games in Chicago, United States (August 21 – September 5, 1959)
  1. Argentina
  2. Brazil
  3. United States

== Births ==
- January 23 — Eustorgio Sánchez, Venezuelan football goalkeeper
- February 7
  - Sammy Lee (footballer), English international footballer and manager
  - Vlastimil Opálek, Slovak footballer
- February 17 — Phil Dudley, English former footballer
- February 27 — Angelo Paolanti, Italian former footballer
- March 4 — Romeo Zondervan, Dutch international footballer
- March 20 — Roland Sikinger, American professional soccer player
- March 28 — Paolo Agabitini, Italian retired footballer
- April 2 — Badou Ezzaki, Moroccan football player and manager
- May 20 — Juan Carlos Letelier, Chilean international footballer
- May 26 — Róger Flores, Costa Rican international footballer
- July 25 — Fyodor Cherenkov; Soviet and Russian international footballer and manager (died 2014)
- July 31 — Wilmar Cabrera, Uruguayan international footballer
- August 18 — Leszek Walankiewicz, Polish footballer
- August 29 — Jaroslav Olejár, Slovak footballer (died 2026)
- September 4 — Fernando Alvez, Uruguayan international footballer
- October 23 — Uriah Rennie, Jamaican-born British referee (died 2025)
- November 8 — Selçuk Yula, Turkish international
- November 11 — Mauricio Peña, Mexican footballer (died 2010)
- November 14 — José Figueroa, Honduran international footballer
- November 17 — Thomas Allofs, German international footballer
- November 22 — Marek Ostrowski, Polish international footballer (died 2017)
- November 28 — Pedro Acosta, Venezuelan international footballer
- December 11 — Thandwa Moreki, Botswana footballer
- December 19 — Edward Metgod, Dutch football goalkeeper and manager
- Full date unknown
  - Vasilije Kalezić, Montenegrin retired footballer

== Deaths ==
=== May ===
- May 18 – Enrique Guaita, Argentine/Italian striker, winner of the 1934 FIFA World Cup and topscorer of the 1934-35 Serie A. (48)

=== July ===
- July 9 – Félix Quesada, Spanish footballer. (57)

=== November ===
- November 8 – Heleno de Freitas, Brazilian striker, topscorer at the South American Championship 1945. (39)
