= 1957 in association football =

The following are the football (soccer) events of the year 1957 throughout the world.

== Events ==
- February 8 – The Confederation of African Football is founded at a meeting in Khartoum, Sudan.
- October 19 – Scottish club Celtic F.C. beat their deadliest rivals Rangers F.C. 7–1 in the Scottish League Cup final at Hampden Park in Glasgow.
- November 20 – Dutch club Ajax Amsterdam makes its European debut by defeating DDR's SC Wismut (1-3) in the first round of the European Cup.

== Winners club national championship ==
- Argentina: River Plate
- Belgium: R. Antwerp F.C.
- Ecuador: Emelec
- England: Manchester United
- France: AS Saint-Etienne
- Hungary: Vasas SC
- Israel: Hapoel Tel Aviv
- Italy: A.C. Milan
- Netherlands: Ajax Amsterdam
- Paraguay: Olimpia Asunción
- Scotland: Rangers
- Soviet Union: FC Dynamo Moscow
- Spain: Real Madrid
- Sweden: IFK Norrköping
- West Germany: Borussia Dortmund

== International tournaments ==
- African Cup of Nations in Sudan (February 10 – 16 1957)
  1. Egypt
  2. Ethiopia
  3. Sudan
- 1957 South American Championship in Peru (March 7 – April 6, 1957)
  1. Argentina
  2. Brazil
- 1957 British Home Championship (October 6, 1956 – April 6, 1957)

England

- Copa Julio Argentino Roca in Brazil (July 7 – 10 1957)
  1. Brazil
  2. Argentina

== Births ==
- January 5 – Karl Allgöwer, German footballer
- January 11 – Bryan Robson, English footballer and manager
- January 19 – Fabrizio Casanova, retired Swiss footballer
- February 1 – Walter Schachner, Austrian footballer and manager
- February 9 – Gordon Strachan, Scottish footballer and manager
- February 28 – Jan Ceulemans, Belgian footballer and manager
- March 12 – Patrick Battiston, French footballer
- May 5 – Said Azimshah Garibzada, Afghan-born former football player and trainer
- May 9 – Fulvio Collovati, Italian footballer
- May 22 – Jan Endeman, Dutch retired footballer
- May 26 – Caryne Selbonne, French footballer
- July 15 — Craig Martin, Canadian soccer player
- September 3 – Walter Kelsch, German footballer
- September 6 – Zhivko Gospodinov, Bulgarian footballer
- September 11
  - Preben Elkjær, Danish footballer
  - Plamen Markov, Bulgarian footballer
- September 19 – Zvonko Kalezić, Montenegrin retired football
- September 26 – Klaus Augenthaler, German footballer and manager
- October 8 – Antonio Cabrini, Italian footballer
- October 25 – Piet Wildschut, Dutch footballer
- October 27 – Glenn Hoddle, English footballer and manager
- November 17 – Bob Oldridge, English former professional footballer
- December 13 – Abdellah Liegeon, Algerian footballer (d. 2025)
- December 17 – Robbie Gaffney, Irish footballer

== Deaths ==
=== January ===
- January 18 – Alvaro Gestido, Uruguayan midfielder, winner of the 1930 FIFA World Cup. (49)

=== October ===
- October 5 – José Leandro Andrade, Uruguayan midfielder, winner of the 1930 FIFA World Cup. (55, Tuberculosis)
