= Kalezić =

Kalezić (Montenegrin Cyrillic: Калезић) is a surname of Montenegrin origin. It may refer to:

- Darije Kalezić (born 1969), Swiss-born Bosnian footballer and manager
- Miloš Kalezić (born 1993), Montenegrin footballer
- Nina Kalezić (born 1996), Montenegrin tennis player
- Slavko Kalezić (born 1985), Montenegrin singer and songwriter
- Vasilije Kalezić (born 1959), Montenegrin footballer
- Vasko Kalezić (born 1994), Montenegrin footballer
- Zoran Kalezić (1950–2023), Montenegrin singer
- Zvonko Kalezić (born 1957), Montenegrin football
