= 1959–60 Football League =

61st season of the Football League

The Football League
- Season: 1959–60
- Champions: Burnley
- Relegated: Gateshead

The 1959–60 season was the 61st completed (62nd overall) season of The Football League.

== Final league tables ==
The tables below are reproduced here in the exact form that they can be found at The Rec.Sport.Soccer Statistics Foundation website and in Rothmans Book of Football League Records 1888–89 to 1978–79, with home and away statistics separated.

Beginning with the season 1894–95, clubs finishing level on points were separated according to goal average (goals scored divided by goals conceded), or more properly put, goal ratio. In case one or more teams had the same goal difference, this system favoured those teams who had scored fewer goals. The goal average system was eventually scrapped beginning with the 1976–77 season.

Since the Fourth Division was established in the 1958–59 season, the bottom four teams of that division have been required to apply for re-election.

== First Division ==
First Division
- Season: 1959–60
- Champions: Burnley; 2nd English title
- Relegated: Leeds United; Luton Town
- European Cup: Burnley
- Cup Winners' Cup: Wolverhampton Wanderers
- Inter-Cities Fairs Cup: Birmingham City
- Matches: 462
- Goals: 1,618 (3.5 per match)
- Top goalscorer: Dennis Viollet (32 goals)
- Biggest home win: Wolverhampton Wanderers 9–0 Fulham (16 September 1959)
- Biggest away win: Blackpool 0–6 Manchester United (27 February 1960); Birmingham City 1–7 West Bromwich Albion (18 April 1960)
- Highest scoring: Manchester City 4–6 Wolverhampton Wanderers (5 September 1959); Newcastle United 8–2 Everton (7 November 1959); Newcastle United 7–3 Manchester United (2 January 1960)

| Pos | Team | Pld | W | D | L | GF | GA | GAv | Pts | Qualification or relegation |
|---|---|---|---|---|---|---|---|---|---|---|
| 1 | Burnley (C) | 42 | 24 | 7 | 11 | 85 | 61 | 1.393 | 55 | Qualification for the European Cup first round |
| 2 | Wolverhampton Wanderers | 42 | 24 | 6 | 12 | 106 | 67 | 1.582 | 54 | Qualification for the Cup Winners' Cup quarter-finals |
| 3 | Tottenham Hotspur | 42 | 21 | 11 | 10 | 86 | 50 | 1.720 | 53 | |
| 4 | West Bromwich Albion | 42 | 19 | 11 | 12 | 83 | 57 | 1.456 | 49 | |
| 5 | Sheffield Wednesday | 42 | 19 | 11 | 12 | 80 | 59 | 1.356 | 49 | |
| 6 | Bolton Wanderers | 42 | 20 | 8 | 14 | 59 | 51 | 1.157 | 48 | |
| 7 | Manchester United | 42 | 19 | 7 | 16 | 102 | 80 | 1.275 | 45 | |
| 8 | Newcastle United | 42 | 18 | 8 | 16 | 82 | 78 | 1.051 | 44 | |
| 9 | Preston North End | 42 | 16 | 12 | 14 | 79 | 76 | 1.039 | 44 | |
| 10 | Fulham | 42 | 17 | 10 | 15 | 73 | 80 | 0.913 | 44 | |
| 11 | Blackpool | 42 | 15 | 10 | 17 | 59 | 71 | 0.831 | 40 | |
| 12 | Leicester City | 42 | 13 | 13 | 16 | 66 | 75 | 0.880 | 39 | |
| 13 | Arsenal | 42 | 15 | 9 | 18 | 68 | 80 | 0.850 | 39 | |
| 14 | West Ham United | 42 | 16 | 6 | 20 | 75 | 91 | 0.824 | 38 | |
| 15 | Everton | 42 | 13 | 11 | 18 | 73 | 78 | 0.936 | 37 | |
| 16 | Manchester City | 42 | 17 | 3 | 22 | 78 | 84 | 0.929 | 37 | |
| 17 | Blackburn Rovers | 42 | 16 | 5 | 21 | 60 | 70 | 0.857 | 37 | |
| 18 | Chelsea | 42 | 14 | 9 | 19 | 76 | 91 | 0.835 | 37 | |
| 19 | Birmingham City | 42 | 13 | 10 | 19 | 63 | 80 | 0.788 | 36 | Qualification for the Inter-Cities Fairs Cup first round |
| 20 | Nottingham Forest | 42 | 13 | 9 | 20 | 50 | 74 | 0.676 | 35 | |
| 21 | Leeds United (R) | 42 | 12 | 10 | 20 | 65 | 92 | 0.707 | 34 | Relegation to the Second Division |
| 22 | Luton Town (R) | 42 | 9 | 12 | 21 | 50 | 73 | 0.685 | 30 | Relegation to the Second Division |

Source: World Football
Rules for classification: 1) Points; 2) Goal average; 3) Goals scored
(C) Champions; (R) Relegated

=== Results ===
| Home \ Away | ARS | BIR | BLB | BLP | BOL | BUR | CHE | EVE | FUL | LEE | LEI | LUT | MCI | MUN | NEW | NOT | PNE | SHW | TOT | WBA | WHU | WOL |
|---|---|---|---|---|---|---|---|---|---|---|---|---|---|---|---|---|---|---|---|---|---|---|
| Arsenal | | 3–0 | 5–2 | 2–1 | 2–1 | 2–4 | 1–4 | 2–1 | 2–0 | 1–1 | 1–1 | 0–3 | 3–1 | 5–2 | 1–0 | 1–1 | 0–3 | 0–1 | 1–1 | 2–4 | 1–3 | 4–4 |
| Birmingham City | 3–0 | | 1–0 | 2–1 | 2–5 | 0–1 | 1–1 | 2–2 | 2–4 | 2–0 | 3–4 | 1–1 | 4–2 | 1–1 | 4–3 | 4–1 | 2–1 | 0–0 | 0–1 | 1–7 | 2–0 | 0–1 |
| Blackburn Rovers | 1–1 | 2–1 | | 1–0 | 1–0 | 3–2 | 1–0 | 3–1 | 4–0 | 3–2 | 0–1 | 0–2 | 2–1 | 1–1 | 1–1 | 1–2 | 1–4 | 3–1 | 1–4 | 3–2 | 6–2 | 0–1 |
| Blackpool | 2–1 | 0–1 | 1–0 | | 3–2 | 1–1 | 3–1 | 0–0 | 3–1 | 3–3 | 3–3 | 0–0 | 1–3 | 0–6 | 2–0 | 0–1 | 0–2 | 0–2 | 2–2 | 2–0 | 3–2 | 3–1 |
| Bolton Wanderers | 0–1 | 4–1 | 0–3 | 0–3 | | 2–1 | 2–0 | 2–1 | 3–2 | 1–1 | 3–1 | 2–2 | 3–1 | 1–1 | 1–4 | 1–1 | 2–1 | 1–0 | 2–1 | 0–0 | 5–1 | 2–1 |
| Burnley | 3–2 | 3–1 | 1–0 | 1–4 | 4–0 | | 2–1 | 5–2 | 0–0 | 0–1 | 1–0 | 3–0 | 4–3 | 1–4 | 2–1 | 8–0 | 2–1 | 3–3 | 2–0 | 2–1 | 1–3 | 4–1 |
| Chelsea | 1–3 | 4–2 | 3–1 | 2–3 | 0–2 | 4–1 | | 1–0 | 4–2 | 1–3 | 2–2 | 3–0 | 3–0 | 3–6 | 2–2 | 1–1 | 4–4 | 0–4 | 1–3 | 2–2 | 2–4 | 1–5 |
| Everton | 3–1 | 4–0 | 2–0 | 4–0 | 0–1 | 1–2 | 6–1 | | 0–0 | 1–0 | 6–1 | 2–2 | 2–1 | 2–1 | 1–2 | 6–1 | 4–0 | 2–1 | 2–1 | 2–2 | 0–1 | 0–2 |
| Fulham | 3–0 | 2–2 | 0–1 | 1–0 | 1–1 | 1–0 | 1–3 | 2–0 | | 5–0 | 1–1 | 4–2 | 5–2 | 0–5 | 4–3 | 3–1 | 1–2 | 1–2 | 1–1 | 2–1 | 1–0 | 3–1 |
| Leeds United | 3–2 | 3–3 | 0–1 | 2–4 | 1–0 | 2–3 | 2–1 | 3–3 | 1–4 | | 1–1 | 1–1 | 4–3 | 2–2 | 2–3 | 1–0 | 2–1 | 1–3 | 2–4 | 1–4 | 3–0 | 0–3 |
| Leicester City | 2–2 | 1–3 | 2–3 | 1–1 | 1–2 | 2–1 | 3–1 | 3–3 | 0–1 | 3–2 | | 3–3 | 5–0 | 3–1 | 0–2 | 0–1 | 2–2 | 2–0 | 1–1 | 0–1 | 2–1 | 2–1 |
| Luton Town | 0–1 | 1–1 | 1–1 | 0–1 | 0–0 | 1–1 | 1–2 | 2–1 | 4–1 | 0–1 | 2–0 | | 1–2 | 2–3 | 3–4 | 1–0 | 1–3 | 0–1 | 1–0 | 0–0 | 3–1 | 1–5 |
| Manchester City | 1–2 | 3–0 | 2–1 | 2–3 | 1–0 | 1–2 | 1–1 | 4–0 | 3–1 | 3–3 | 3–2 | 1–2 | | 3–0 | 3–4 | 2–1 | 2–1 | 4–1 | 1–2 | 0–1 | 3–1 | 4–6 |
| Manchester United | 4–2 | 2–1 | 1–0 | 3–1 | 2–0 | 1–2 | 0–1 | 5–0 | 3–3 | 6–0 | 4–1 | 4–1 | 0–0 | | 3–2 | 3–1 | 1–1 | 3–1 | 1–5 | 2–3 | 5–3 | 0–2 |
| Newcastle United | 4–1 | 1–0 | 3–1 | 1–1 | 0–2 | 1–3 | 1–1 | 8–2 | 3–1 | 2–1 | 0–2 | 3–2 | 0–1 | 7–3 | | 2–1 | 1–2 | 3–3 | 1–5 | 0–0 | 0–0 | 1–0 |
| Nottingham Forest | 0–3 | 0–2 | 2–2 | 0–0 | 2–0 | 0–1 | 3–1 | 1–1 | 2–2 | 4–1 | 1–0 | 2–0 | 1–2 | 1–5 | 3–0 | | 1–1 | 2–1 | 1–3 | 1–2 | 3–1 | 0–0 |
| Preston North End | 0–3 | 3–2 | 5–3 | 4–1 | 1–0 | 1–0 | 4–5 | 0–0 | 4–1 | 1–1 | 1–1 | 2–0 | 1–5 | 4–0 | 1–2 | 1–0 | | 3–4 | 1–1 | 1–1 | 1–1 | 4–3 |
| Sheffield Wednesday | 5–1 | 2–4 | 3–0 | 5–0 | 1–0 | 1–1 | 1–1 | 2–2 | 1–1 | 1–0 | 2–2 | 2–0 | 1–0 | 4–2 | 2–0 | 0–1 | 2–2 | | 2–1 | 2–0 | 7–0 | 2–2 |
| Tottenham Hotspur | 3–0 | 0–0 | 2–1 | 4–1 | 0–2 | 1–1 | 0–1 | 3–0 | 1–1 | 1–4 | 1–2 | 1–1 | 0–1 | 2–1 | 4–0 | 2–1 | 5–1 | 4–1 | | 2–2 | 2–2 | 5–1 |
| West Bromwich Albion | 1–0 | 1–1 | 2–0 | 2–1 | 1–1 | 0–0 | 1–3 | 6–2 | 2–4 | 3–0 | 5–0 | 4–0 | 2–0 | 3–2 | 2–2 | 2–3 | 4–0 | 3–1 | 1–2 | | 3–2 | 0–1 |
| West Ham United | 0–0 | 3–1 | 2–1 | 1–0 | 1–2 | 2–5 | 4–2 | 2–2 | 1–2 | 1–2 | 3–0 | 3–1 | 4–1 | 2–1 | 3–5 | 4–1 | 2–1 | 1–1 | 1–2 | 4–1 | | 3–2 |
| Wolverhampton Wanderers | 3–3 | 2–0 | 3–1 | 1–1 | 0–1 | 6–1 | 3–1 | 2–0 | 9–0 | 4–2 | 0–3 | 3–2 | 4–2 | 3–2 | 2–0 | 3–1 | 3–3 | 3–1 | 1–3 | 3–1 | 5–0 | |

Updated to match(es) played on unknown. Source: Ian Laschke: Rothmans Book of Football League Records 1888–89 to 1978–79. Macdonald and Jane’s, London & Sydney, 1980.
Legend: Blue = home team win; Yellow = draw; Red = away team win.

=== Maps ===
Locations of the Football League First Division London teams 1959–1960
Locations of the Football League First Division 1959–1960 teams

== Second Division ==
Second Division
- Season: 1959–60
- Champions: Aston Villa
- Promoted: Aston Villa; Cardiff City
- Relegated: Hull City; Bristol City
- Matches: 462
- Goals: 1,565 (3.39 per match)
- Top goalscorer: Brian Clough (39 goals)

| Pos | Team | Pld | W | D | L | GF | GA | GAv | Pts | Qualification or relegation |
|---|---|---|---|---|---|---|---|---|---|---|
| 1 | Aston Villa (C, P) | 42 | 25 | 9 | 8 | 89 | 43 | 2.070 | 59 | Promotion to the First Division |
| 2 | Cardiff City (P) | 42 | 23 | 12 | 7 | 90 | 62 | 1.452 | 58 | Promotion to the First Division |
| 3 | Liverpool | 42 | 20 | 10 | 12 | 90 | 66 | 1.364 | 50 | |
| 4 | Sheffield United | 42 | 19 | 12 | 11 | 68 | 51 | 1.333 | 50 | |
| 5 | Middlesbrough | 42 | 19 | 10 | 13 | 90 | 64 | 1.406 | 48 | |
| 6 | Huddersfield Town | 42 | 19 | 9 | 14 | 73 | 52 | 1.404 | 47 | |
| 7 | Charlton Athletic | 42 | 17 | 13 | 12 | 90 | 87 | 1.034 | 47 | |
| 8 | Rotherham United | 42 | 17 | 13 | 12 | 61 | 60 | 1.017 | 47 | |
| 9 | Bristol Rovers | 42 | 18 | 11 | 13 | 72 | 78 | 0.923 | 47 | |
| 10 | Leyton Orient | 42 | 15 | 14 | 13 | 76 | 61 | 1.246 | 44 | |
| 11 | Ipswich Town | 42 | 19 | 6 | 17 | 78 | 68 | 1.147 | 44 | |
| 12 | Swansea Town | 42 | 15 | 10 | 17 | 82 | 84 | 0.976 | 40 | |
| 13 | Lincoln City | 42 | 16 | 7 | 19 | 75 | 78 | 0.962 | 39 | |
| 14 | Brighton & Hove Albion | 42 | 13 | 12 | 17 | 67 | 76 | 0.882 | 38 | |
| 15 | Scunthorpe United | 42 | 13 | 10 | 19 | 57 | 71 | 0.803 | 36 | |
| 16 | Sunderland | 42 | 12 | 12 | 18 | 52 | 65 | 0.800 | 36 | |
| 17 | Stoke City | 42 | 14 | 7 | 21 | 66 | 83 | 0.795 | 35 | |
| 18 | Derby County | 42 | 14 | 7 | 21 | 61 | 77 | 0.792 | 35 | |
| 19 | Plymouth Argyle | 42 | 13 | 9 | 20 | 61 | 89 | 0.685 | 35 | |
| 20 | Portsmouth | 42 | 10 | 12 | 20 | 59 | 77 | 0.766 | 32 | |
| 21 | Hull City (R) | 42 | 10 | 10 | 22 | 48 | 76 | 0.632 | 30 | Relegation to the Third Division |
| 22 | Bristol City (R) | 42 | 11 | 5 | 26 | 60 | 97 | 0.619 | 27 | Relegation to the Third Division |

Rules for classification: 1) Points; 2) Goal average; 3) Goals scored
(C) Champions; (P) Promoted; (R) Relegated

=== Results ===
| Home \ Away | AST | B&HA | BRI | BRR | CAR | CHA | DER | HUD | HUL | IPS | LEY | LIN | LIV | MID | PLY | POR | ROT | SCU | SHU | STK | SUN | SWA |
|---|---|---|---|---|---|---|---|---|---|---|---|---|---|---|---|---|---|---|---|---|---|---|
| Aston Villa | | 3–1 | 2–1 | 4–1 | 2–0 | 11–1 | 3–2 | 4–0 | 1–1 | 3–1 | 1–0 | 1–1 | 4–4 | 1–0 | 2–0 | 5–2 | 3–0 | 5–0 | 1–3 | 2–1 | 3–0 | 1–0 |
| Brighton & Hove Albion | 1–2 | | 5–1 | 2–2 | 2–2 | 1–1 | 2–0 | 3–2 | 1–1 | 1–4 | 1–1 | 3–3 | 1–2 | 3–2 | 2–2 | 3–1 | 0–0 | 0–1 | 0–2 | 1–0 | 2–1 | 1–2 |
| Bristol City | 0–5 | 0–1 | | 2–1 | 0–3 | 1–2 | 0–1 | 2–3 | 0–1 | 5–1 | 1–1 | 1–0 | 1–0 | 2–0 | 2–1 | 2–0 | 2–3 | 0–2 | 2–2 | 1–2 | 1–0 | 2–2 |
| Bristol Rovers | 1–1 | 4–5 | 2–1 | | 1–1 | 2–2 | 2–1 | 2–0 | 1–0 | 2–1 | 2–2 | 3–3 | 0–2 | 0–2 | 2–0 | 2–0 | 3–1 | 1–1 | 3–2 | 3–1 | 3–1 | 3–1 |
| Cardiff City | 1–0 | 1–4 | 4–2 | 2–2 | | 5–1 | 2–0 | 2–1 | 3–2 | 3–2 | 5–1 | 6–2 | 3–2 | 2–0 | 0–1 | 1–4 | 1–4 | 4–2 | 2–0 | 4–4 | 2–1 | 2–1 |
| Charlton Athletic | 2–0 | 3–1 | 4–2 | 2–2 | 2–1 | | 6–1 | 1–1 | 3–2 | 1–3 | 0–0 | 2–2 | 3–0 | 1–0 | 5–2 | 6–1 | 2–2 | 5–2 | 1–1 | 1–2 | 3–1 | 2–2 |
| Derby County | 2–2 | 0–1 | 3–0 | 1–0 | 1–2 | 1–2 | | 3–2 | 1–3 | 3–0 | 1–1 | 3–1 | 1–2 | 1–7 | 1–0 | 1–0 | 1–1 | 3–0 | 1–1 | 2–0 | 0–1 | 1–2 |
| Huddersfield Town | 3–1 | 2–0 | 6–1 | 1–1 | 2–1 | 4–0 | 2–2 | | 1–0 | 3–1 | 1–1 | 3–0 | 1–0 | 2–0 | 2–0 | 6–3 | 2–1 | 2–0 | 0–1 | 2–3 | 1–1 | 4–3 |
| Hull City | 0–1 | 3–1 | 1–1 | 3–1 | 0–0 | 0–4 | 1–1 | 1–1 | | 2–0 | 1–2 | 0–5 | 0–1 | 3–3 | 3–1 | 1–3 | 1–0 | 0–2 | 0–2 | 4–0 | 0–0 | 3–1 |
| Ipswich Town | 2–1 | 3–0 | 1–3 | 3–0 | 1–1 | 1–1 | 1–1 | 1–4 | 2–0 | | 6–3 | 3–0 | 0–1 | 1–0 | 3–3 | 1–1 | 2–3 | 1–0 | 2–0 | 4–0 | 6–1 | 4–1 |
| Leyton Orient | 0–0 | 3–2 | 3–1 | 1–2 | 3–4 | 2–0 | 3–0 | 2–1 | 3–1 | 4–1 | | 4–0 | 2–0 | 5–0 | 2–3 | 1–2 | 2–3 | 1–1 | 1–1 | 2–1 | 1–1 | 2–1 |
| Lincoln City | 0–0 | 2–1 | 3–1 | 0–1 | 2–3 | 5–3 | 6–2 | 0–2 | 3–0 | 0–1 | 2–2 | | 4–2 | 5–2 | 0–1 | 0–2 | 0–1 | 2–1 | 2–0 | 3–0 | 0–0 | 2–0 |
| Liverpool | 2–1 | 2–2 | 4–2 | 4–0 | 0–4 | 2–0 | 4–1 | 2–2 | 5–3 | 3–1 | 4–3 | 1–3 | | 1–2 | 4–1 | 1–1 | 3–0 | 2–0 | 3–0 | 5–1 | 3–0 | 4–1 |
| Middlesbrough | 0–1 | 4–1 | 6–3 | 5–1 | 1–1 | 3–0 | 3–0 | 1–0 | 4–0 | 4–1 | 2–2 | 3–2 | 3–3 | | 6–2 | 0–0 | 3–0 | 3–1 | 1–2 | 1–0 | 1–1 | 2–0 |
| Plymouth Argyle | 3–0 | 3–2 | 1–4 | 5–3 | 1–1 | 6–4 | 0–5 | 1–3 | 3–2 | 3–1 | 1–0 | 0–2 | 1–1 | 2–2 | | 1–1 | 1–0 | 4–0 | 1–1 | 2–3 | 0–0 | 3–1 |
| Portsmouth | 1–2 | 2–2 | 2–0 | 4–5 | 1–1 | 2–2 | 2–3 | 0–2 | 1–1 | 0–2 | 1–1 | 1–2 | 2–1 | 6–3 | 1–0 | | 2–0 | 4–0 | 0–2 | 2–2 | 1–2 | 1–3 |
| Rotherham United | 2–1 | 1–0 | 3–1 | 3–0 | 2–2 | 3–3 | 1–2 | 1–1 | 1–0 | 1–4 | 1–1 | 1–0 | 2–2 | 0–2 | 1–1 | 2–1 | | 1–1 | 0–0 | 3–0 | 1–0 | 1–1 |
| Scunthorpe United | 1–2 | 1–2 | 1–1 | 3–4 | 1–2 | 1–1 | 3–2 | 0–2 | 3–0 | 2–2 | 2–1 | 5–0 | 1–1 | 1–1 | 2–0 | 1–0 | 2–1 | | 1–1 | 1–1 | 3–1 | 3–1 |
| Sheffield United | 1–1 | 4–1 | 5–2 | 1–1 | 2–1 | 2–0 | 2–1 | 2–0 | 6–0 | 1–0 | 0–2 | 3–2 | 2–1 | 0–0 | 4–0 | 0–0 | 2–3 | 2–1 | | 0–1 | 1–2 | 3–3 |
| Stoke City | 3–3 | 1–3 | 1–3 | 0–1 | 0–1 | 1–3 | 2–1 | 1–1 | 3–1 | 1–2 | 2–1 | 6–1 | 1–1 | 2–5 | 1–0 | 4–0 | 2–3 | 1–3 | 1–2 | | 3–1 | 4–2 |
| Sunderland | 1–0 | 0–0 | 3–2 | 2–2 | 1–1 | 1–3 | 3–1 | 0–0 | 1–3 | 0–1 | 1–4 | 2–4 | 1–1 | 2–2 | 4–0 | 2–0 | 1–2 | 1–0 | 5–1 | 0–2 | | 4–0 |
| Swansea Town | 1–3 | 2–2 | 6–1 | 3–0 | 3–3 | 5–2 | 1–3 | 3–1 | 0–0 | 2–1 | 1–0 | 2–1 | 5–4 | 3–1 | 6–1 | 1–1 | 2–2 | 3–1 | 2–1 | 2–2 | 1–2 | |

Updated to match(es) played on unknown. Source: Ian Laschke: Rothmans Book of Football League Records 1888–89 to 1978–79. Macdonald and Jane’s, London & Sydney, 1980.
Legend: Blue = home team win; Yellow = draw; Red = away team win.

=== Maps ===
Locations of the Football League Second Division London teams 1959–1960
Locations of the Football League Second Division 1959–1960 teams

== Third Division ==
Football League Third Division
- Season: 1959–60
- Champions: Southampton (1st title)
- Promoted: Norwich City
- Relegated: Accrington Stanley, Mansfield Town; Wrexham; York City
- Matches: 552
- Goals: 1,816 (3.29 per match)
- Top goalscorer: Derek Reeves (Southampton), 39

| Pos | Team | Pld | W | D | L | GF | GA | GAv | Pts | Promotion or relegation |
|---|---|---|---|---|---|---|---|---|---|---|
| 1 | Southampton (C, P) | 46 | 26 | 9 | 11 | 106 | 75 | 1.413 | 61 | Promotion to the Second Division |
| 2 | Norwich City (P) | 46 | 24 | 11 | 11 | 82 | 54 | 1.519 | 59 | Promotion to the Second Division |
| 3 | Shrewsbury Town | 46 | 18 | 16 | 12 | 97 | 75 | 1.293 | 52 | |
| 4 | Grimsby Town | 46 | 18 | 16 | 12 | 87 | 70 | 1.243 | 52 | |
| 5 | Coventry City | 46 | 21 | 10 | 15 | 78 | 63 | 1.238 | 52 | |
| 6 | Brentford | 46 | 21 | 9 | 16 | 78 | 61 | 1.279 | 51 | |
| 7 | Bury | 46 | 21 | 9 | 16 | 64 | 51 | 1.255 | 51 | |
| 8 | Queens Park Rangers | 46 | 18 | 13 | 15 | 73 | 54 | 1.352 | 49 | |
| 9 | Colchester United | 46 | 18 | 11 | 17 | 83 | 74 | 1.122 | 47 | |
| 10 | Bournemouth & Boscombe Athletic | 46 | 17 | 13 | 16 | 72 | 72 | 1.000 | 47 | |
| 11 | Reading | 46 | 18 | 10 | 18 | 84 | 77 | 1.091 | 46 | |
| 12 | Southend United | 46 | 19 | 8 | 19 | 76 | 74 | 1.027 | 46 | |
| 13 | Newport County | 46 | 20 | 6 | 20 | 80 | 79 | 1.013 | 46 | |
| 14 | Port Vale | 46 | 19 | 8 | 19 | 80 | 79 | 1.013 | 46 | |
| 15 | Halifax Town | 46 | 18 | 10 | 18 | 70 | 72 | 0.972 | 46 | |
| 16 | Swindon Town | 46 | 19 | 8 | 19 | 69 | 78 | 0.885 | 46 | |
| 17 | Barnsley | 46 | 15 | 14 | 17 | 65 | 66 | 0.985 | 44 | |
| 18 | Chesterfield | 46 | 18 | 7 | 21 | 71 | 84 | 0.845 | 43 | |
| 19 | Bradford City | 46 | 15 | 12 | 19 | 66 | 74 | 0.892 | 42 | |
| 20 | Tranmere Rovers | 46 | 14 | 13 | 19 | 72 | 75 | 0.960 | 41 | |
| 21 | York City (R) | 46 | 13 | 12 | 21 | 57 | 73 | 0.781 | 38 | Relegation to the Fourth Division |
| 22 | Mansfield Town (R) | 46 | 15 | 6 | 25 | 81 | 112 | 0.723 | 36 | Relegation to the Fourth Division |
| 23 | Wrexham (R) | 46 | 14 | 8 | 24 | 68 | 101 | 0.673 | 36 | Relegation to the Fourth Division |
| 24 | Accrington Stanley (R) | 46 | 11 | 5 | 30 | 57 | 123 | 0.463 | 27 | Relegation to the Fourth Division |

(C) Champions; (P) Promoted; (R) Relegated

=== Results ===
| Home \ Away | ACC | BAR | B&BA | BRA | BRE | BRY | CHF | COL | COV | GRI | HAL | MAN | NPC | NWC | PTV | QPR | REA | SHR | SOU | STD | SWI | TRA | WRE | YOR |
|---|---|---|---|---|---|---|---|---|---|---|---|---|---|---|---|---|---|---|---|---|---|---|---|---|
| Accrington Stanley | | 2–1 | 2–1 | 0–4 | 3–4 | 1–3 | 1–3 | 1–2 | 0–2 | 2–4 | 0–5 | 0–1 | 0–0 | 3–4 | 1–3 | 1–2 | 0–0 | 2–2 | 2–2 | 0–4 | 3–1 | 1–3 | 2–2 | 4–0 |
| Barnsley | 5–0 | | 1–0 | 2–0 | 1–2 | 2–2 | 3–1 | 2–1 | 1–0 | 3–3 | 1–2 | 2–2 | 0–2 | 2–0 | 1–0 | 2–1 | 3–3 | 0–0 | 1–0 | 4–1 | 0–3 | 2–0 | 6–1 | 1–1 |
| Bournemouth & Boscombe Athletic | 3–1 | 1–1 | | 3–2 | 1–2 | 2–1 | 1–1 | 3–2 | 2–2 | 4–2 | 1–0 | 6–0 | 4–1 | 0–0 | 3–0 | 1–1 | 1–1 | 2–2 | 1–3 | 0–0 | 3–1 | 2–1 | 1–3 | 2–0 |
| Bradford City | 4–5 | 0–0 | 0–0 | | 0–2 | 0–0 | 1–0 | 0–0 | 1–3 | 2–2 | 1–2 | 4–1 | 6–2 | 1–1 | 3–1 | 3–1 | 0–2 | 2–3 | 2–0 | 3–1 | 1–0 | 1–0 | 2–2 | 2–0 |
| Brentford | 3–0 | 3–0 | 1–0 | 4–0 | | 1–1 | 3–0 | 2–0 | 3–1 | 0–2 | 1–1 | 1–1 | 1–2 | 3–4 | 2–0 | 1–1 | 2–2 | 2–1 | 2–2 | 3–1 | 2–1 | 2–1 | 3–1 | 1–2 |
| Bury | 0–1 | 0–2 | 0–2 | 0–0 | 1–0 | | 1–1 | 3–1 | 2–1 | 1–1 | 2–2 | 4–1 | 0–1 | 1–0 | 3–1 | 2–0 | 1–0 | 2–1 | 1–2 | 3–0 | 0–3 | 4–1 | 3–2 | 2–0 |
| Chesterfield | 0–3 | 4–1 | 4–0 | 1–2 | 1–0 | 0–2 | | 1–1 | 0–3 | 2–2 | 2–1 | 0–1 | 2–0 | 2–1 | 4–1 | 0–4 | 2–1 | 2–2 | 3–2 | 1–0 | 1–3 | 2–0 | 5–1 | 2–0 |
| Colchester United | 5–1 | 2–2 | 1–2 | 2–1 | 2–1 | 3–0 | 1–0 | | 0–0 | 2–2 | 1–0 | 3–0 | 2–1 | 3–0 | 3–1 | 2–0 | 4–2 | 3–2 | 1–1 | 2–3 | 0–0 | 4–0 | 3–1 | 2–2 |
| Coventry City | 2–1 | 2–1 | 4–0 | 2–2 | 2–1 | 0–1 | 1–0 | 3–1 | | 0–2 | 0–1 | 2–0 | 1–1 | 2–1 | 1–1 | 0–0 | 1–1 | 1–1 | 4–1 | 2–0 | 3–1 | 1–0 | 5–3 | 3–2 |
| Grimsby Town | 4–0 | 2–0 | 1–1 | 1–3 | 1–3 | 2–2 | 5–1 | 4–1 | 3–0 | | 3–2 | 2–1 | 0–1 | 1–1 | 1–1 | 3–1 | 0–1 | 2–1 | 3–2 | 1–1 | 3–0 | 1–1 | 3–1 | 2–2 |
| Halifax Town | 0–2 | 5–0 | 1–0 | 4–0 | 1–0 | 1–0 | 0–1 | 3–2 | 2–2 | 1–2 | | 4–2 | 2–1 | 0–1 | 1–1 | 3–1 | 2–2 | 1–2 | 3–1 | 2–1 | 3–1 | 0–3 | 2–0 | 1–2 |
| Mansfield Town | 4–1 | 1–4 | 3–4 | 0–0 | 0–1 | 1–5 | 4–1 | 1–3 | 2–4 | 3–2 | 1–1 | | 3–1 | 3–2 | 6–3 | 4–3 | 4–4 | 1–0 | 4–2 | 1–1 | 1–2 | 0–2 | 6–2 | 2–0 |
| Newport County | 1–3 | 4–0 | 5–2 | 2–0 | 4–2 | 3–1 | 3–1 | 3–2 | 2–0 | 0–2 | 5–1 | 0–1 | | 1–1 | 4–3 | 2–3 | 3–2 | 1–3 | 5–1 | 1–1 | 1–3 | 2–1 | 4–1 | 3–2 |
| Norwich City | 4–0 | 0–0 | 2–3 | 0–0 | 2–1 | 2–0 | 3–0 | 3–2 | 1–4 | 1–1 | 3–0 | 5–1 | 1–0 | | 5–1 | 1–0 | 4–2 | 1–1 | 1–2 | 4–3 | 3–2 | 3–0 | 3–1 | 1–0 |
| Port Vale | 2–0 | 1–0 | 1–0 | 0–2 | 3–1 | 3–0 | 3–1 | 1–1 | 0–1 | 2–1 | 7–0 | 4–1 | 2–1 | 2–1 | | 0–0 | 4–1 | 0–3 | 1–1 | 3–1 | 6–1 | 1–1 | 3–1 | 2–0 |
| Queens Park Rangers | 5–1 | 1–0 | 3–0 | 5–0 | 2–4 | 2–0 | 3–3 | 3–1 | 2–1 | 0–0 | 3–0 | 2–0 | 3–0 | 0–0 | 2–2 | | 2–0 | 1–1 | 0–1 | 0–0 | 2–0 | 2–1 | 2–1 | 0–0 |
| Reading | 2–0 | 3–2 | 2–2 | 1–0 | 3–3 | 0–1 | 6–3 | 2–1 | 4–2 | 1–2 | 1–1 | 3–2 | 0–1 | 0–2 | 2–3 | 2–0 | | 2–3 | 2–0 | 4–1 | 3–0 | 5–4 | 0–1 | 1–0 |
| Shrewsbury Town | 5–0 | 2–2 | 0–0 | 3–0 | 1–1 | 0–2 | 2–4 | 4–1 | 3–2 | 5–2 | 2–2 | 6–3 | 6–2 | 1–3 | 2–1 | 1–1 | 3–2 | | 1–1 | 1–3 | 3–0 | 0–0 | 3–2 | 4–0 |
| Southampton | 5–1 | 2–1 | 4–3 | 2–0 | 2–0 | 0–2 | 4–3 | 4–2 | 5–1 | 1–1 | 3–2 | 5–2 | 2–0 | 2–2 | 3–2 | 2–1 | 1–0 | 6–3 | | 3–1 | 5–1 | 1–1 | 3–0 | 3–1 |
| Southend | 6–1 | 2–2 | 3–0 | 2–1 | 2–0 | 0–4 | 1–2 | 1–0 | 1–0 | 3–0 | 3–0 | 0–2 | 3–2 | 1–0 | 2–1 | 3–2 | 2–0 | 2–1 | 2–4 | | 1–3 | 7–1 | 1–1 | 1–1 |
| Swindon Town | 0–1 | 1–1 | 2–0 | 5–3 | 0–0 | 1–0 | 1–1 | 4–3 | 2–0 | 3–2 | 1–1 | 2–1 | 1–0 | 0–1 | 2–3 | 2–1 | 0–4 | 4–2 | 0–3 | 2–0 | | 1–1 | 4–1 | 1–1 |
| Tranmere | 5–1 | 2–0 | 1–1 | 2–3 | 2–1 | 2–0 | 3–0 | 1–1 | 3–1 | 2–0 | 1–1 | 4–2 | 2–2 | 0–0 | 6–0 | 0–3 | 0–1 | 3–3 | 2–4 | 1–0 | 2–2 | | 4–1 | 2–2 |
| Wrexham | 2–3 | 1–0 | 1–2 | 4–3 | 3–2 | 1–1 | 2–3 | 1–1 | 1–3 | 2–1 | 2–1 | 3–0 | 0–0 | 1–2 | 1–0 | 1–1 | 2–1 | 1–1 | 2–1 | 3–1 | 1–2 | 1–0 | | 3–1 |
| York City | 3–0 | 0–0 | 3–2 | 1–1 | 0–1 | 1–0 | 1–0 | 2–3 | 1–1 | 3–3 | 1–2 | 2–1 | 2–0 | 1–2 | 2–0 | 2–1 | 2–3 | 0–1 | 2–2 | 2–3 | 1–0 | 3–0 | 3–0 | |

Updated to match(es) played on unknown. Source: Ian Laschke: Rothmans Book of Football League Records 1888–89 to 1978–79. Macdonald and Jane’s, London & Sydney, 1980.
Legend: Blue = home team win; Yellow = draw; Red = away team win.

=== Maps ===
Locations of the Football League Third Division London teams 1959–1960
Locations of the Football League Third Division teams 1959–1960

== Fourth Division ==
Football League Fourth Division
- Season: 1959–60
- Champions: Walsall (1st title)
- Promoted: Notts County, Torquay United; Watford
- Failed re-election: Gateshead
- Matches: 552
- Goals: 1,734 (3.14 per match)
- Top goalscorer: Cliff Holton (Watford), 42

| Pos | Team | Pld | W | D | L | GF | GA | GAv | Pts | Promotion or relegation |
|---|---|---|---|---|---|---|---|---|---|---|
| 1 | Walsall (C, P) | 46 | 28 | 9 | 9 | 102 | 60 | 1.700 | 65 | Promotion to the Third Division |
| 2 | Notts County (P) | 46 | 26 | 8 | 12 | 107 | 69 | 1.551 | 60 | Promotion to the Third Division |
| 3 | Torquay United (P) | 46 | 26 | 8 | 12 | 84 | 58 | 1.448 | 60 | Promotion to the Third Division |
| 4 | Watford (P) | 46 | 24 | 9 | 13 | 92 | 67 | 1.373 | 57 | Promotion to the Third Division |
| 5 | Millwall | 46 | 18 | 17 | 11 | 84 | 61 | 1.377 | 53 | |
| 6 | Northampton Town | 46 | 22 | 9 | 15 | 85 | 63 | 1.349 | 53 | |
| 7 | Gillingham | 46 | 21 | 10 | 15 | 74 | 69 | 1.072 | 52 | |
| 8 | Crystal Palace | 46 | 19 | 12 | 15 | 84 | 64 | 1.313 | 50 | |
| 9 | Exeter City | 46 | 19 | 11 | 16 | 80 | 70 | 1.143 | 49 | |
| 10 | Stockport County | 46 | 19 | 11 | 16 | 58 | 54 | 1.074 | 49 | |
| 11 | Bradford (Park Avenue) | 46 | 17 | 15 | 14 | 70 | 68 | 1.029 | 49 | |
| 12 | Rochdale | 46 | 18 | 10 | 18 | 65 | 60 | 1.083 | 46 | |
| 13 | Aldershot | 46 | 18 | 9 | 19 | 77 | 74 | 1.041 | 45 | |
| 14 | Crewe Alexandra | 46 | 18 | 9 | 19 | 79 | 88 | 0.898 | 45 | |
| 15 | Darlington | 46 | 17 | 9 | 20 | 63 | 73 | 0.863 | 43 | |
| 16 | Workington | 46 | 14 | 14 | 18 | 68 | 60 | 1.133 | 42 | |
| 17 | Doncaster Rovers | 46 | 16 | 10 | 20 | 69 | 76 | 0.908 | 42 | |
| 18 | Barrow | 46 | 15 | 11 | 20 | 77 | 87 | 0.885 | 41 | |
| 19 | Carlisle United | 46 | 15 | 11 | 20 | 51 | 66 | 0.773 | 41 | |
| 20 | Chester | 46 | 14 | 12 | 20 | 59 | 77 | 0.766 | 40 | |
| 21 | Southport | 46 | 10 | 14 | 22 | 48 | 92 | 0.522 | 34 | Re-elected |
| 22 | Gateshead (R) | 46 | 12 | 9 | 25 | 58 | 86 | 0.674 | 33 | Failed re-election and demoted |
| 23 | Oldham Athletic | 46 | 8 | 12 | 26 | 41 | 83 | 0.494 | 28 | Re-elected |
| 24 | Hartlepools United | 46 | 10 | 7 | 29 | 59 | 109 | 0.541 | 27 | Re-elected |

Source: rsssf.com
(C) Champions; (P) Promoted; (R) Relegated

=== Results ===
| Home \ Away | ALD | BRW | BPA | CRL | CHE | CRE | CRY | DAR | DON | EXE | GAT | GIL | HAR | MIL | NOR | NTC | OLD | ROC | SOU | STP | TOR | WAL | WAT | WRK |
|---|---|---|---|---|---|---|---|---|---|---|---|---|---|---|---|---|---|---|---|---|---|---|---|---|
| Aldershot | | 6–1 | 6–1 | 0–2 | 3–2 | 6–1 | 1–0 | 3–0 | 1–1 | 1–0 | 3–2 | 3–1 | 3–0 | 1–2 | 3–0 | 1–1 | 2–0 | 0–0 | 0–0 | 1–0 | 1–3 | 0–2 | 2–2 | 3–1 |
| Barrow | 3–0 | | 3–3 | 5–1 | 3–0 | 0–0 | 0–1 | 4–1 | 1–1 | 3–3 | 2–2 | 0–1 | 2–2 | 2–2 | 0–1 | 4–3 | 2–0 | 3–0 | 3–1 | 5–1 | 1–1 | 2–3 | 2–1 | 2–1 |
| Bradford Park Avenue | 3–2 | 2–0 | | 1–1 | 1–1 | 2–2 | 3–1 | 1–0 | 3–3 | 1–0 | 4–2 | 3–0 | 6–2 | 1–1 | 3–0 | 1–1 | 2–0 | 0–0 | 3–0 | 1–1 | 2–2 | 1–3 | 1–1 | 3–2 |
| Carlisle United | 0–0 | 0–1 | 1–3 | | 2–1 | 4–2 | 2–2 | 1–0 | 2–0 | 0–4 | 4–0 | 0–1 | 1–1 | 3–3 | 0–2 | 2–0 | 0–1 | 1–1 | 1–0 | 0–4 | 2–0 | 1–1 | 1–0 | 0–1 |
| Chester | 5–1 | 3–2 | 1–1 | 0–1 | | 0–0 | 0–1 | 1–1 | 2–0 | 1–0 | 4–2 | 4–2 | 1–1 | 2–1 | 1–1 | 2–1 | 0–0 | 2–1 | 2–2 | 1–2 | 1–1 | 1–3 | 0–1 | 3–1 |
| Crewe Alexandra | 3–2 | 3–2 | 4–1 | 3–0 | 2–1 | | 1–1 | 5–0 | 2–0 | 1–1 | 4–1 | 1–2 | 1–0 | 2–0 | 0–1 | 2–1 | 2–2 | 1–3 | 5–1 | 4–2 | 1–2 | 1–5 | 1–3 | 2–0 |
| Crystal Palace | 1–1 | 9–0 | 1–0 | 2–1 | 3–4 | 4–0 | | 2–0 | 4–0 | 1–0 | 2–2 | 3–3 | 5–2 | 1–2 | 0–1 | 1–1 | 3–2 | 4–0 | 2–2 | 3–1 | 1–1 | 1–2 | 8–1 | 0–1 |
| Darlington | 4–0 | 3–1 | 4–3 | 2–1 | 0–0 | 1–1 | 1–1 | | 2–2 | 0–1 | 2–1 | 2–1 | 2–0 | 1–1 | 3–2 | 5–2 | 1–3 | 0–0 | 5–0 | 1–2 | 1–0 | 0–2 | 0–3 | 0–3 |
| Doncaster Rovers | 1–2 | 1–4 | 2–0 | 4–1 | 2–0 | 4–0 | 1–2 | 0–1 | | 0–1 | 1–0 | 3–0 | 5–1 | 0–0 | 3–2 | 0–4 | 0–0 | 2–1 | 5–0 | 1–0 | 1–3 | 1–1 | 1–0 | 2–0 |
| Exeter City | 3–1 | 2–2 | 3–1 | 1–3 | 2–0 | 2–4 | 2–2 | 0–0 | 4–2 | | 2–1 | 2–0 | 5–0 | 2–2 | 1–1 | 3–3 | 4–3 | 4–1 | 1–1 | 2–1 | 1–0 | 1–2 | 2–0 | 1–0 |
| Gateshead | 4–1 | 3–1 | 1–2 | 1–0 | 0–1 | 4–2 | 0–2 | 1–3 | 5–0 | 1–0 | | 2–2 | 1–1 | 1–0 | 1–3 | 0–0 | 2–0 | 1–2 | 1–0 | 2–1 | 0–2 | 3–0 | 1–3 | 2–1 |
| Gillingham | 3–1 | 1–0 | 2–0 | 3–1 | 3–1 | 1–1 | 0–0 | 2–0 | 2–1 | 2–1 | 5–4 | | 3–1 | 3–1 | 2–1 | 0–1 | 2–2 | 2–0 | 4–1 | 0–2 | 1–0 | 2–0 | 2–0 | 2–2 |
| Hartlepools United | 3–0 | 0–1 | 3–0 | 1–2 | 2–3 | 2–0 | 0–1 | 1–2 | 2–6 | 4–3 | 3–0 | 3–1 | | 0–2 | 1–4 | 2–4 | 2–2 | 0–1 | 3–2 | 2–1 | 4–0 | 1–2 | 0–0 | 1–4 |
| Millwall | 2–0 | 3–3 | 2–0 | 1–1 | 7–1 | 1–4 | 1–0 | 5–2 | 1–1 | 2–3 | 4–0 | 3–3 | 4–0 | | 2–1 | 1–1 | 0–1 | 2–0 | 2–2 | 3–2 | 2–0 | 1–1 | 2–2 | 3–0 |
| Northampton Town | 2–0 | 6–0 | 3–1 | 2–2 | 1–0 | 0–0 | 0–2 | 3–1 | 3–1 | 1–1 | 2–0 | 2–1 | 3–0 | 0–3 | | 4–2 | 8–1 | 3–1 | 2–2 | 1–1 | 3–0 | 0–1 | 1–2 | 0–0 |
| Notts County | 5–3 | 1–2 | 0–1 | 2–1 | 2–1 | 4–1 | 7–1 | 5–4 | 3–4 | 3–0 | 4–0 | 3–1 | 4–0 | 2–1 | 2–1 | | 3–1 | 2–1 | 4–1 | 3–0 | 1–1 | 2–1 | 2–1 | 2–0 |
| Oldham Athletic | 0–1 | 1–0 | 2–0 | 0–1 | 0–0 | 2–4 | 1–0 | 1–3 | 1–1 | 1–2 | 1–1 | 3–1 | 1–2 | 1–1 | 0–1 | 0–3 | | 1–0 | 0–1 | 0–0 | 0–2 | 2–4 | 0–0 | 2–2 |
| Rochdale | 2–0 | 4–1 | 0–1 | 3–0 | 0–0 | 4–2 | 4–0 | 2–0 | 2–0 | 3–0 | 2–0 | 1–0 | 2–0 | 0–1 | 2–2 | 1–4 | 2–0 | | 1–0 | 3–0 | 4–2 | 0–2 | 3–3 | 1–1 |
| Southport | 0–4 | 1–0 | 1–1 | 1–1 | 3–1 | 0–1 | 3–1 | 0–1 | 1–1 | 3–2 | 1–0 | 1–1 | 1–1 | 2–1 | 1–0 | 0–4 | 1–0 | 2–2 | | 3–0 | 1–2 | 1–4 | 1–1 | 2–2 |
| Stockport County | 1–1 | 1–0 | 0–0 | 0–0 | 3–0 | 1–0 | 0–1 | 1–0 | 2–0 | 1–0 | 0–0 | 1–1 | 2–1 | 2–2 | 3–0 | 3–1 | 3–1 | 2–1 | 1–0 | | 0–1 | 2–0 | 4–0 | 2–0 |
| Torquay United | 2–1 | 3–2 | 1–1 | 2–1 | 1–2 | 5–2 | 2–1 | 1–2 | 2–1 | 2–3 | 1–0 | 2–0 | 3–0 | 2–2 | 5–3 | 3–1 | 4–1 | 1–1 | 4–0 | 4–0 | | 2–1 | 2–1 | 2–1 |
| Walsall | 1–0 | 2–1 | 2–1 | 0–1 | 2–1 | 3–1 | 3–0 | 1–0 | 5–2 | 2–2 | 2–2 | 2–3 | 2–2 | 2–1 | 1–2 | 2–2 | 2–1 | 4–2 | 8–0 | 3–1 | 3–2 | | 3–4 | 2–2 |
| Watford | 1–3 | 2–0 | 1–0 | 3–1 | 4–2 | 2–0 | 4–2 | 2–1 | 1–2 | 5–2 | 5–0 | 3–1 | 7–2 | 0–2 | 3–1 | 4–2 | 6–0 | 2–1 | 2–1 | 0–0 | 0–1 | 2–2 | | 3–2 |
| Workington | 3–3 | 1–1 | 0–1 | 1–0 | 5–0 | 5–0 | 1–1 | 1–1 | 2–0 | 2–1 | 1–1 | 1–1 | 3–0 | 4–0 | 5–1 | 0–1 | 2–0 | 2–0 | 1–1 | 1–1 | 0–2 | 0–3 | 0–1 | |

Updated to match(es) played on unknown. Source: Ian Laschke: Rothmans Book of Football League Records 1888–89 to 1978–79. Macdonald and Jane’s, London & Sydney, 1980.
Legend: Blue = home team win; Yellow = draw; Red = away team win.

=== Maps ===
Locations of the Football League Fourth Division London teams 1959–1960
Locations of the Football League Fourth Division teams 1959–1960

== Attendances ==
=== Division One ===
| No. | Club | Average | ± | Highest | Lowest |
|---|---|---|---|---|---|
| 1 | Tottenham Hotspur FC | 47,948 | 18.5% | 62,602 | 32,824 |
| 2 | Manchester United | 47,288 | -11.2% | 62,673 | 33,902 |
| 3 | Everton FC | 40,788 | 4.1% | 65,719 | 19,172 |
| 4 | Chelsea FC | 39,423 | -3.5% | 67,819 | 18,963 |
| 5 | Arsenal FC | 39,341 | -13.0% | 60,791 | 19,597 |
| 6 | Wolverhampton Wanderers FC | 36,244 | -5.7% | 56,283 | 21,546 |
| 7 | Newcastle United FC | 36,037 | -8.7% | 57,200 | 16,148 |
| 8 | Manchester City FC | 35,637 | 9.4% | 65,981 | 19,653 |
| 9 | Sheffield Wednesday FC | 32,034 | 18.7% | 49,409 | 18,420 |
| 10 | Fulham FC | 30,271 | 15.3% | 44,858 | 17,536 |
| 11 | West Ham United FC | 28,554 | 0.7% | 37,941 | 21,155 |
| 12 | West Bromwich Albion FC | 27,461 | -12.5% | 40,739 | 12,113 |
| 13 | Blackburn Rovers FC | 27,299 | -10.6% | 41,694 | 15,832 |
| 14 | Birmingham City FC | 27,072 | 1.4% | 41,248 | 18,661 |
| 15 | Burnley FC | 26,978 | 13.7% | 47,696 | 17,398 |
| 16 | Nottingham Forest FC | 26,739 | -6.9% | 42,335 | 13,506 |
| 17 | Bolton Wanderers FC | 25,998 | -6.0% | 42,324 | 14,791 |
| 18 | Leicester City FC | 25,399 | -8.8% | 34,445 | 16,682 |
| 19 | Preston North End FC | 24,552 | 9.4% | 35,016 | 15,007 |
| 20 | Leeds United FC | 21,877 | -12.2% | 36,037 | 8,557 |
| 21 | Blackpool FC | 21,783 | 4.4% | 35,303 | 12,410 |
| 22 | Luton Town FC | 17,067 | -14.1% | 27,055 | 9,799 |

=== Division Two ===
| No. | Club | Average | ± | Highest | Lowest |
|---|---|---|---|---|---|
| 1 | Aston Villa FC | 34,257 | 1.1% | 50,039 | 21,291 |
| 2 | Liverpool FC | 30,269 | -17.6% | 49,981 | 19,411 |
| 3 | Middlesbrough FC | 25,550 | 2.7% | 47,297 | 13,044 |
| 4 | Cardiff City FC | 24,183 | 36.0% | 52,364 | 16,231 |
| 5 | Sunderland AFC | 22,831 | -17.8% | 37,059 | 11,944 |
| 6 | Plymouth Argyle FC | 20,383 | -11.1% | 29,895 | 8,546 |
| 7 | Bristol Rovers FC | 18,486 | 3.3% | 27,630 | 11,372 |
| 8 | Brighton & Hove Albion FC | 18,331 | -18.6% | 31,484 | 10,510 |
| 9 | Sheffield United FC | 18,037 | -7.9% | 26,339 | 11,795 |
| 10 | Bristol City FC | 17,755 | -21.1% | 29,985 | 9,013 |
| 11 | Portsmouth FC | 16,156 | -32.7% | 24,627 | 9,912 |
| 12 | Derby County FC | 15,815 | -16.7% | 26,394 | 10,440 |
| 13 | Charlton Athletic FC | 15,687 | -6.7% | 28,629 | 10,192 |
| 14 | Hull City AFC | 15,499 | 7.8% | 29,399 | 5,719 |
| 15 | Huddersfield Town AFC | 14,773 | -0.5% | 25,728 | 9,336 |
| 16 | Stoke City FC | 14,506 | -17.3% | 27,208 | 4,070 |
| 17 | Swansea City AFC | 14,355 | -1.8% | 24,848 | 7,920 |
| 18 | Ipswich Town FC | 13,768 | -3.5% | 19,283 | 10,865 |
| 19 | Leyton Orient FC | 13,250 | -0.6% | 22,918 | 6,914 |
| 20 | Rotherham United FC | 12,869 | 22.8% | 20,537 | 7,029 |
| 21 | Scunthorpe United FC | 11,113 | -10.2% | 15,384 | 6,537 |
| 22 | Lincoln City FC | 10,733 | -5.3% | 16,483 | 6,122 |

=== Division Three ===
| No. | Club | Average | ± | Highest | Lowest |
|---|---|---|---|---|---|
| 1 | Norwich City FC | 26,402 | 25.1% | 36,479 | 13,740 |
| 2 | Southampton FC | 18,052 | 31.6% | 25,042 | 11,515 |
| 3 | Coventry City FC | 16,348 | -3.5% | 28,122 | 8,397 |
| 4 | Brentford FC | 11,912 | -14.4% | 21,634 | 6,328 |
| 5 | Reading FC | 11,464 | -9.5% | 23,692 | 5,972 |
| 6 | Port Vale FC | 10,733 | -15.9% | 22,987 | 5,514 |
| 7 | Bury FC | 10,628 | 12.6% | 16,310 | 4,431 |
| 8 | Grimsby Town FC | 10,543 | -19.6% | 15,298 | 4,858 |
| 9 | AFC Bournemouth | 10,403 | -2.6% | 21,657 | 6,349 |
| 10 | Southend United FC | 10,322 | -8.1% | 16,568 | 5,722 |
| 11 | Queens Park Rangers FC | 10,285 | 12.3% | 19,532 | 4,346 |
| 12 | Swindon Town FC | 10,228 | -10.0% | 16,645 | 5,798 |
| 13 | Bradford City AFC | 10,163 | -8.4% | 18,033 | 5,986 |
| 14 | Tranmere Rovers | 9,965 | -15.7% | 17,580 | 5,204 |
| 15 | Wrexham AFC | 9,495 | -8.2% | 15,911 | 2,819 |
| 16 | Shrewsbury Town FC | 8,999 | 11.4% | 14,614 | 6,107 |
| 17 | Colchester United FC | 7,812 | 0.7% | 13,053 | 5,215 |
| 18 | York City FC | 7,507 | -7.6% | 11,846 | 4,751 |
| 19 | Mansfield Town FC | 7,183 | -15.2% | 11,646 | 4,970 |
| 20 | Halifax Town AFC | 6,768 | 1.6% | 14,182 | 3,812 |
| 21 | Chesterfield FC | 6,578 | -27.1% | 9,451 | 3,683 |
| 22 | Barnsley FC | 6,315 | -43.7% | 13,677 | 3,583 |
| 23 | Newport County AFC | 6,241 | -5.5% | 8,965 | 3,314 |
| 24 | Accrington Stanley FC | 4,131 | -34.1% | 8,473 | 925 |

=== Division Four ===
| No. | Club | Average | ± | Highest | Lowest |
|---|---|---|---|---|---|
| 1 | Crystal Palace FC | 15,630 | 5.0% | 28,929 | 9,045 |
| 2 | Millwall FC | 14,560 | 22.8% | 20,652 | 8,442 |
| 3 | Notts County FC | 13,820 | 45.0% | 22,788 | 8,793 |
| 4 | Watford FC | 12,013 | 43.3% | 20,641 | 7,815 |
| 5 | Walsall FC | 11,157 | 23.0% | 15,403 | 6,945 |
| 6 | Northampton Town FC | 8,306 | 2.7% | 13,041 | 3,477 |
| 7 | Crewe Alexandra FC | 7,962 | 7.0% | 12,220 | 5,656 |
| 8 | Exeter City FC | 7,421 | -20.8% | 13,050 | 4,383 |
| 9 | Torquay United FC | 6,812 | 26.3% | 10,316 | 3,729 |
| 10 | Stockport County FC | 6,552 | -29.2% | 11,882 | 3,585 |
| 11 | Bradford Park Avenue AFC | 6,399 | -8.8% | 8,357 | 3,220 |
| 12 | Gillingham FC | 6,231 | -10.1% | 7,850 | 3,469 |
| 13 | Barrow AFC | 5,612 | 29.8% | 7,238 | 4,123 |
| 14 | Aldershot Town FC | 5,454 | 30.2% | 9,010 | 2,857 |
| 15 | Chester City FC | 5,421 | -21.0% | 9,294 | 3,560 |
| 16 | Carlisle United FC | 5,295 | -26.2% | 9,344 | 1,914 |
| 17 | Doncaster Rovers FC | 5,247 | -21.3% | 8,720 | 1,359 |
| 18 | Oldham Athletic FC | 4,957 | -6.9% | 9,720 | 2,264 |
| 19 | Darlington FC | 4,651 | -7.0% | 7,800 | 2,752 |
| 20 | Rochdale AFC | 4,599 | -4.4% | 6,474 | 2,508 |
| 21 | Workington AFC | 4,310 | -14.5% | 6,593 | 2,344 |
| 22 | Hartlepool United FC | 3,646 | -33.7% | 6,877 | 1,953 |
| 23 | Southport FC | 3,563 | 5.2% | 5,168 | 2,388 |
| 24 | Gateshead AFC | 3,412 | -17.6% | 6,618 | 1,488 |

== See also ==
- 1959-60 in English football
