= Dvorianky =

Village and municipality in Slovakia

Dvorianky Szécsudvar
- Municipality
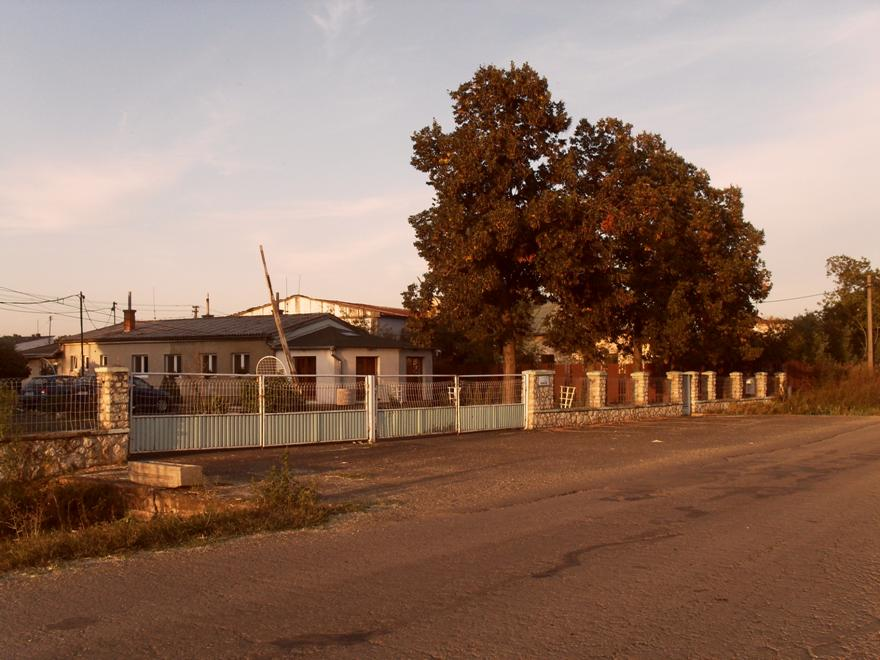

- Flag

- Location of Dvorianky in the Košice Region Location of Dvorianky in Slovakia
- Coordinates: 48.73°N 21.72°E
- Country: Slovakia
- Region: Košice Region
- District: Trebišov District
- First mentioned: 1314

Area
  - Total: 6.17 km^{2} (2.38 sq mi)
- Elevation: 114 m (374 ft)

Population (2025)
  - Total: 667
- Time zone: UTC+1 (CET)
  - Summer (DST): UTC+2 (CEST)
- Postal code: 766 2
- Area code: +421 56
- Vehicle registration plate (until 2022): TV
- Website: www.obecdvorianky.sk

Dvorianky (Hungarian: Szécsudvar) is a village and municipality in the Trebišov District in the Košice Region of eastern Slovakia.

== History ==
In historical records the village was first mentioned in 1245.

== Geography ==
The municipality lies at an altitude of 114 metres (374 ft) and covers an area of 6.17 km^{2} (2.38 sq mi) (2025).

== Population ==
Population statistic (10 years)
Year	1995	2005	2015	2025
Count	638	616	617	667
Difference		−3.44%	+0.16%	+8.10%

Population statistic
Year	2024	2025
Count	672	667
Difference		−0.74%

It has a population of 667 people (31 December 2025).

=== Ethnicity ===
Census 2021 (1+ %)
Ethnicity	Number	Fraction
Slovak	633	97.38%
Not found out	10	1.53%
Total	650	

In year 2021 was 650 people by ethnicity 633 as Slovak, 10 as Not found out, 5 as Czech, 5 as Rusyn, 2 as Ukrainian, 1 as Romani, 1 as German and 1 as Hungarian.

Note on population: The difference values of population numbers in the table "Population statistic" and in the sections "Ethnicity" & "Religion" is caused by the use of various statistical methods.

=== Religion ===
Census 2021 (1+ %)
Religion	Number	Fraction
Roman Catholic Church	280	43.08%
Greek Catholic Church	267	41.08%
None	43	6.62%
Not found out	31	4.77%
Calvinist Church	16	2.46%
Total	650	

In year 2021 was 650 people by religion 280 from Roman Catholic Church, 267 from Greek Catholic Church, 43 from None, 31 from Not found out, 16 from Calvinist Church, 4 from Eastern Orthodox Church, 3 from Jehovah's Witnesses, 2 from United Methodist Church, 1 from Christian Congregations in Slovakia, 1 from Other, 1 from Evangelical Church and 1 from Ad hoc movements.

== Facilities ==
The village has a public library a gymnasium and a football pitch.

== Notable people ==
Jaroslav Olejár (1959–2026), Football goalkeeper.

== Genealogical resources ==
The records for genealogical research are available at the state archive "Statny Archiv in Kosice, Slovakia"

- Roman Catholic church records (births/marriages/deaths): 1779-1895 (parish B)
- Greek Catholic church records (births/marriages/deaths): 1805-1896 (parish A)

== See also ==
- List of municipalities and towns in Slovakia
