= Roland Sikinger =

American soccer player

Personal information
- Date of birth: March 20, 1959 (age 67)
- Place of birth: Milwaukee, Wisconsin, United States
- Position: Goalkeeper

Senior career*
| Years | Team | Apps | (Gls) |
- Milwaukee Bavarians
| 1978–1980 | Houston Hurricane | 16 | (0) |
| 1978–1979 | Houston Summit (indoor) | 8 | (0) |
| 1979–1980 | Wichita Wings (indoor) | 3 | (0) |
| 1981 | New York Eagles | | |
| 1984 | Houston Dynamos | | |

International career
- U.S. U-20
- * Club domestic league appearances and goals

Roland Sikinger is a retired American soccer goalkeeper who played professionally in the North American Soccer League, United Soccer League, American Soccer League and Major Indoor Soccer League.

== Player ==
=== Club career ===
Sikinger graduated from James Madison High School. He went on to play for the Milwaukee Bavarians. In 1978, he signed with the Houston Hurricane of the North American Soccer League. He spent three seasons with the Hurricane. In the fall of 1978, the Houston Summit was established as a charter member of the Major Indoor Soccer League. The Summit drew on the Hurricane for most of their roster. Consequently, Sikinger played the 1978-1979 indoor season with the Summit. In 1979, he moved to the Wichita Wings for one season. In 1981, he played for the New York Eagles of the American Soccer League. The Eagles played in Albany, New York and were sometimes referred to as the Albany Eagles. In 1984, he played for the Houston Dynamos in the United Soccer League.

Sikinger was inducted into the Wisconsin Soccer Hall of Fame in 2020.

=== National team ===
Sikinger played for the national youth team at the 1979 Pan American Games. He was also a member of the 1980 U. S. Olympic soccer team which qualified for the tournament but was unable to compete when President Jimmy Carter decided that the United States would boycott the games due to the Soviet invasion of Afghanistan.
