= Fabrizio Casanova =

Swiss footballer (born 1957)

Personal information
- Date of birth: 19 January 1957 (age 69)
- Position: Defender

Senior career*
Years	Team	Apps	(Gls)
1975–1988	FC Lugano		
- * Club domestic league appearances and goals

Fabrizio Casanova (born 19 January 1957) is a retired Swiss football defender.
