= Angelo Paolanti =

Italian footballer (born 1959)

Personal information
- Date of birth: February 27, 1959 (age 67)
- Place of birth: Rome, Italy
- Position: Defender

Senior career*
Years	Team	Apps	(Gls)
1977–1978	Roma	1	(0)
1978–1979	Pro Cavese	14	(0)
1979–1980	Banco di Roma	12	(2)
1980–1981	L'Aquila	1	(0)
1981–1982	Mestre	9	(0)
- * Club domestic league appearances and goals

Angelo Paolanti (born February 27, 1959) is an Italian former footballer who, playing as a defender, made 37 appearances in the Italian professional leagues. His professional debut in the 1977–78 season for A.S. Roma remained his only Serie A game.
