= Eustorgio Sánchez =

Venezuelan footballer (born 1959)

Eustorgio Sánchez (born January 23, 1959) is a retired Venezuelan football goalkeeper. He competed for his native South American country at the 1980 Summer Olympics in Moscow, Soviet Union, where the Men's National Team was eliminated after the preliminary round. Sánchez played for Deportivo Italia.
