= Jaroslav Olejár =

Slovak footballer (1959–2026)

Personal information
- Date of birth: 29 August 1959
- Place of birth: Dvorianky, Czechoslovakia
- Date of death: 29 August 2026 (aged 67)
- Height: 1.97 m (6 ft 6 in)
- Position: Goalkeeper

Youth career
- Dvorianky
- Slavoj Trebišov

Senior career*
Years	Team	Apps	(Gls)
1980–1983	Slavoj Trebišov		
1983–1985	Sparta Prague	18	(0)
1985–1994	Košice		
1994–1996	Krompachy		
- * Club domestic league appearances and goals

Jaroslav Olejár (29 August 1959 – 29 August 2026) was a Slovak professional footballer who played as a goalkeeper. He won two Czechoslovak First League titles with Sparta Prague in 1984 and 1985, and later won the final edition of the Czechoslovak Cup with 1. FC Košice in 1993. He made thirteen appearances in European club competition, including all eight of Sparta's matches in the 1983–84 UEFA Cup, a run that took in a first-round victory over Real Madrid.

== Early life and Trebišov ==
Olejár was born on 29 August 1959 in Dvorianky, a village in the Trebišov District of eastern Slovakia, then part of Czechoslovakia. His father was a goalkeeper in regional and district competitions, and Olejár said that watching him play was the reason he took up the position himself; the village pitch stood directly across the road from the family house.

He moved to nearby Slavoj Trebišov while still of youth age and established himself in the second-division club's senior side in the early 1980s. Standing just under 1.97 m, he was unusually tall for a goalkeeper of the period. Sparta Prague first approached him in 1982, but the transfer was delayed when a change of coach at the Prague club altered its goalkeeping plans; he eventually joined in the summer of 1983 after finishing the 1982–83 season with Trebišov.

== Sparta Prague ==
Olejár made his Czechoslovak First League debut for Sparta in the 1983–84 season and did not appear in the competition for any other club; he finished with 18 first-league appearances in total.

With Sparta's established goalkeeper Jan Poštulka suspended, the 24-year-old Olejár was selected for the club's 1983–84 UEFA Cup first-round tie against Real Madrid, then coached by Alfredo Di Stéfano. Sparta won the first leg 3–2 at the Letná Stadium on 14 September 1983 before a crowd of close to 40,000, and drew 1–1 at the Santiago Bernabéu Stadium a fortnight later in front of more than 80,000 spectators, conceding only a penalty converted by Uli Stielike, to go through 4–3 on aggregate. Wins over Widzew Łódź (3–1 on aggregate) and Watford (7–2) followed before Sparta were knocked out in the quarter-finals by Hajduk Split, losing 2–0 after extra time in the second leg for a 2–1 aggregate defeat; Olejár later said the goal he conceded in Split, from a tight angle at a free kick, stayed with him for the rest of his life. He played in all eight of Sparta's matches in the competition.

Sparta won the league championship in 1983–84 and 1984–85. Olejár made one appearance in the 1984–85 European Cup before the arrival of Jan Stejskal from Brno and a subsequent change of coach reduced his playing time, and he left the club in 1985.

== Košice ==
Olejár returned to eastern Slovakia in 1985, joining the Košice club that competed successively as ZŤS, VSS and, from 1992, 1. FC Košice; he was involved in the formation of the latter club. He described the period from 1985 to 1990 as an unsettled one, with the team repeatedly challenging for promotion in the autumn and fighting relegation in the spring.

The newly formed 1. FC Košice won the Slovak Cup in 1992–93, beating DAC Dunajská Streda on penalties in the final at Rimavská Sobota. That victory took the second-division club into the final of the 33rd and last Czechoslovak Cup, played on 6 June 1993 at the Tatran Poštorná ground near Břeclav before about 6,000 spectators. Košice beat the reigning federal champions Sparta Prague 5–1; Olejár kept goal.

The cup win qualified Košice for the 1993–94 European Cup Winners' Cup, in which Olejár played all four of the club's matches. Košice eliminated Žalgiris Vilnius 3–1 on aggregate in the qualifying round, then lost 3–2 on aggregate to Beşiktaş in the first round, going down 2–0 in Istanbul after winning the home leg 2–1.

He left Košice in 1994 at the age of 35, having considered but not completed a move to Austria, and extended his playing career in the Slovak lower divisions with Krompachy.

== Later career ==
After retiring as a player, Olejár worked as a goalkeeping coach in Kuwait for three years, an appointment arranged through the former Czechoslovak international Ján Pivarník, who was coaching there at the time. He subsequently coached youth players in Košice and Banská Bystrica, and served as goalkeeping coach and assistant manager at Moldava nad Bodvou.

== Personal life and death ==
Olejár was married and had two sons; his elder son is also called Jaroslav, and the former goalkeeper was therefore commonly referred to in Slovak media as Jaroslav Olejár starší ("senior").

Following a long illness, Olejár died on 29 August 2026, his 67th birthday.

== Career statistics ==
=== European competition ===
Club	Competition	Season	Apps
Sparta Prague	UEFA Cup	1983–84	8
Sparta Prague	European Cup	1984–85	1
1. FC Košice	European Cup Winners' Cup	1993–94	4
Total			13

== Honours ==
Sparta Prague

- Czechoslovak First League: 1983–84, 1984–85

1. FC Košice

- Czechoslovak Cup: 1992–93
- Slovak Cup: 1992–93

Individual

- Letter of thanks from the Fair Play Club of the Czechoslovak Olympic Committee: 1988
