= Phil Dudley =

English footballer

Personal information
- Full name: Philip William Dudley
- Date of birth: 17 February 1959 (age 67)
- Place of birth: Basildon, England
- Position: Right-back

Youth career
- –1977: Southend United

Senior career*
Years	Team	Apps	(Gls)
1977–1983	Southend United	112	(3)
- Chelmsford City
- Basildon United
- Heybridge Swifts
- Haringey Borough
- Bowers
- Billericay Town
- Southend Manor
- Ramsden
- Great Baddow
- Writtle
- * Club domestic league appearances and goals

Philip William Dudley (born 17 February 1959) is an English former footballer who played as a right-back.

== Career ==
Dudley began his career at Southend United, linking up with the first team in 1977 after time in the youth team. Dudley appeared 112 times in the Football League for Southend, before moving to Chelmsford City in July 1983. After a spell at Chelmsford, Dudley played for Basildon United, Heybridge Swifts, Haringey Borough, Bowers, Billericay Town and Southend Manor, before finishing his career with local Chelmsfordian clubs Ramsden, Great Baddow and Writtle.

== Honours ==
Southend United

- Football League Fourth Division: 1980–81
