= Vlastimil Opálek =

Slovak footballer

Personal information
- Date of birth: 7 February 1959
- Place of birth: Trnava, Czechoslovakia
- Date of death: 5 October 1995 (aged 36)
- Place of death: Drnovice, Czech Republic
- Position: Goalkeeper

Senior career*
Years	Team	Apps	(Gls)
1979–1990	Spartak Trnava		
1990–1992	SV Schwechat		
- * Club domestic league appearances and goals

Vlastimil Opálek (7 February 1959 – 5 October 1995) was a Slovak football goalkeeper.

== Career ==
Opálek was born in Trnava. He played as a goalkeeper for FC Spartak Trnava from 1979 to 1990 and for SV Schwechat in Austria from 1990 to 1992. After retiring from playing, he became a goalkeeping coach for Spartak at age 35. In the first league match played on Sunday, 16 November 1986 in Trnava, he took a penalty kick in the 77th minute, which he did not convert. The home team Spartak TAZ still defeated Sparta ČKD Praha (later champions) 1–0 with a goal by Marian Brezina in the 48th minute.

== Personal ==
Opálek died in a traffic accident in Drnovice at age 36.
