= Paolo Agabitini =

Italian retired footballer

Personal information
- Date of birth: 28 March 1959 (age 67)
- Place of birth: Perugia, Italy
- Height: 1.84 m (6 ft 1/2 in)
- Position: Defender

Senior career*
Years	Team	Apps	(Gls)
1976–1978	Ternana	2	(0)
1978–1979	Monopoli	31	(1)
1979–1980	Lanciano	24	(0)
1980–1984	Casarano	90	(0)
1984–1985	Civitanovese	31	(0)
1985–1986	Maceratese	28	(0)
1986–1988	Ascoli	21	(0)
1988–1989	Lanciano	25	(0)
1989–1990	Ravenna	23	(0)
1990–1991	Savoia	11	(0)
- * Club domestic league appearances and goals as of 21 December 2013

Paolo Agabitini (born 28 March 1959) is an Italian former footballer. He spent most of his career on S.S.D. Casarano Calcio.
