= Jan Endeman =

Dutch footballer

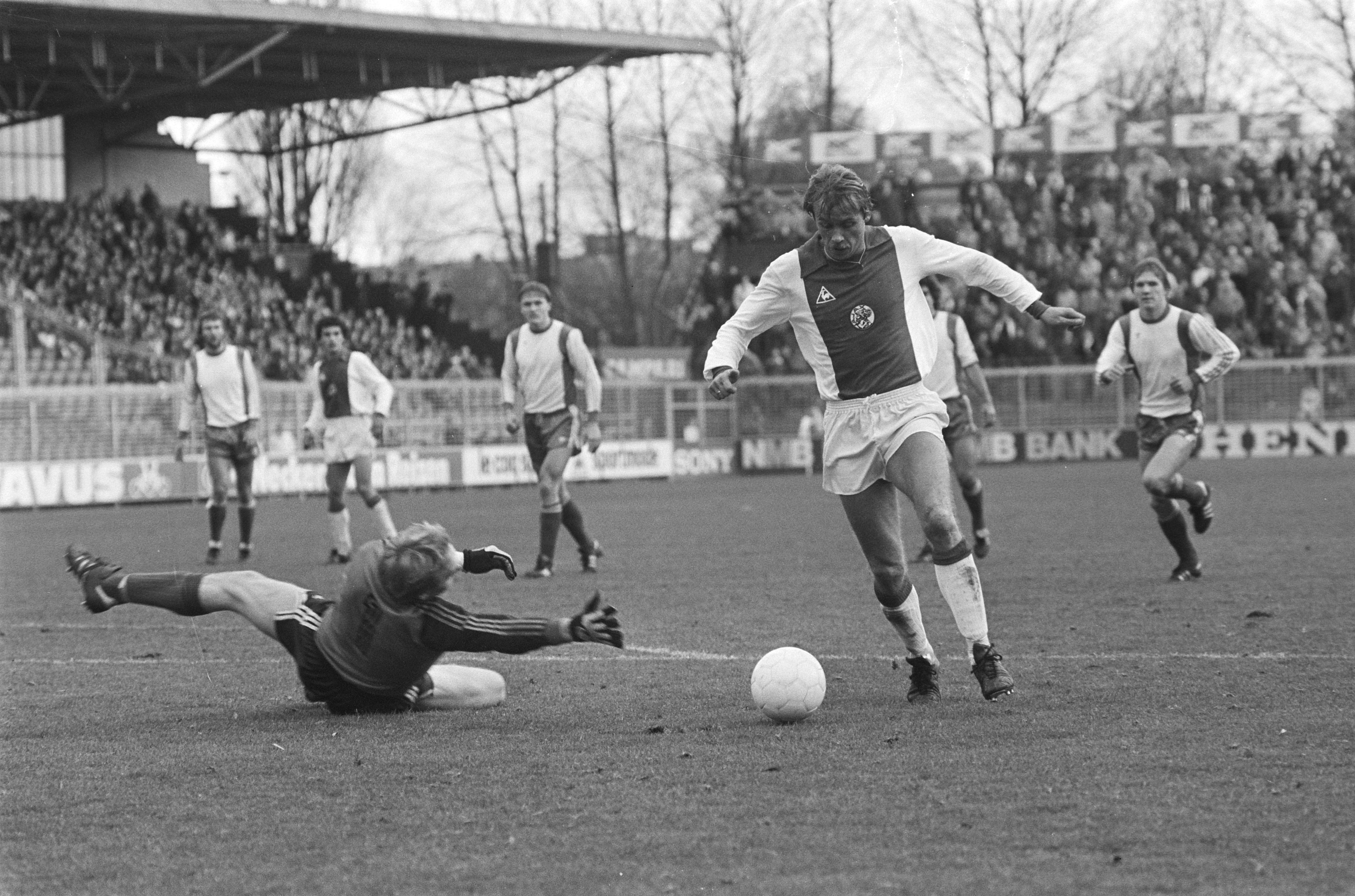
- Endeman being beaten by Ajax midfielder Dick Schoenaker, 1981

Personal information
- Date of birth: 22 May 1957 (age 69)
- Place of birth: Eibergen, Netherlands
- Position: Goalkeeper

Youth career
- 1965-1971: Eibergse Boys
- 1971-1975: SC Eibergen

Senior career*
| Years | Team | Apps | (Gls) |
| 1975-1979 | Go Ahead Eagles | 37 | (0) |
| 1979 | Edmonton Drillers | 29 | (0) |
| 1979-1982 | Go Ahead Eagles | 69 | (0) |
| Total | | 135 | (0) |
- * Club domestic league appearances and goals

Jan Endeman (born 22 May 1957 in Eibergen, the Netherlands) is a Dutch retired footballer.

Endeman only played in the Eredivisie for Go Ahead Eagles and also had a spell at NASL side Edmonton Drillers.

== Personal life ==
After retiring as a player, Endeman worked as a director of a construction company. He lived in Oss, is married with two children and also worked as a goalkeeper coach at Heracles, HSC '21 and UDI '19.
