= Mauricio Peña =

Mexican footballer (1959-2010)

Personal information
- Full name: Mauricio Peña Almada
- Date of birth: 11 November 1959
- Place of birth: Mexico City, Mexico
- Date of death: 31 August 2010 (aged 50)
- Place of death: Querétaro, Mexico
- Height: 1.81 m (5 ft 11 1/2 in)
- Position: Midfielder

Youth career
- –1980: Pumas

Senior career*
Years	Team	Apps	(Gls)
1980–1987	Pumas	215	(14)
1987–1991	Necaxa	69	(2)
- * Club domestic league appearances and goals

Mauricio Peña Almada (11 November 1959 – 31 August 2010) was a Mexican footballer who played as a midfielder.

== Career ==
Born in Mexico City, Peña began playing football with the youth sides of UNAM Pumas. He joined the senior side and made his Mexican Primera División debut under manager Bora Milutinović on 19 September 1980. He won the 1980–81 Primera title with Pumas, and helped the club win the 1980 CONCACAF Champions' Cup and the 1981 Copa Interamericana.

In 1987, Peña joined Club Necaxa where he would play until he finished his career in 1991.

After he retired from playing football, Peña worked for the Pumas youth academies. He also was a technical advisor to Jesús Ramírez at the 2005 FIFA U-17 World Championship finals in Peru.

== Personal ==
Peña died from Lou Gehrig's disease in Querétaro at age 50.
