= Thandwa Moreki =

Motswana footballer

Personal information
- Full name: Thandwa Moreki
- Date of birth: 11 December 1959 (age 66)
- Place of birth: Botswana
- Position: Midfielder

Team information
- Current team: Township Rollers

Senior career*
Years	Team	Apps	(Gls)
2001–2009	Gaborone United		
2009–	Township Rollers		

International career
2002	Botswana	1	(0)
- * Club domestic league appearances and goals

Thandwa Moreki is a Motswana former footballer. He made one appearance for the Botswana national football team in a friendly against Swaziland in 2002.
