= Caryne Selbonne =

French association football player (born 1967)

Personal information
- Date of birth: 26 May 1967 (age 59)
- Place of birth: Pointe-à-Pitre, France
- Position: Defender

Senior career*
Years	Team	Apps	(Gls)
1986-1991	Paris Saint-Germain		

International career
1990	France	3	(0)
- * Club domestic league appearances and goals

Caryne Selbonne was a French international footballer who played for Paris Saint-Germain as a defender.
