= Bob Oldridge =

English footballer

Personal information
- Full name: Andrew Robert Oldridge
- Date of birth: 17 November 1957 (age 68)
- Place of birth: Barton-upon-Humber, England
- Position: Forward

Senior career*
Years	Team	Apps	(Gls)
1976–1977	Grimsby Town	15	(1)
- * Club domestic league appearances and goals

Andrew Robert Oldridge (born 17 November 1957) is an English former professional footballer who played as a forward in the Football League.
