= Vasilije Kalezić =

Montenegrin footballer

Personal information
- Full name: Vasilije Kalezić
- Date of birth: 1959 (age 66–67)
- Place of birth: Danilovgrad, SFR Yugoslavia
- Position: Midfielder

Senior career*
Years	Team	Apps	(Gls)
1978–1979	OFK Titograd	13	(6)
1980–1981	Budućnost Titograd	13	(0)
1982	OFK Titograd	13	(6)
1982–1984	Čelik Zenica	17	(0)
1985–1986	Trepča	29	(3)
1986–1987	Ivangrad	27	(1)
1987–1988	OFK Titograd	8	(0)
- * Club domestic league appearances and goals

Vasilije Kalezić (Serbian Cyrillic: Василије Калезић; born 1959) is a Montenegrin retired football midfielder who played in several clubs in Yugoslav First and Second League.

== Club career ==
Born in Jastreb, a location within the municipality of Danilovgrad, he started playing in 1976 in the second-level side OFK Titograd before moving to Budućnost Titograd and playing with them in the Yugoslav First League. Later he played with Čelik Zenica, Trepča and Ivangrad.
