= Zvonko Kalezić =

Montenegrin footballer

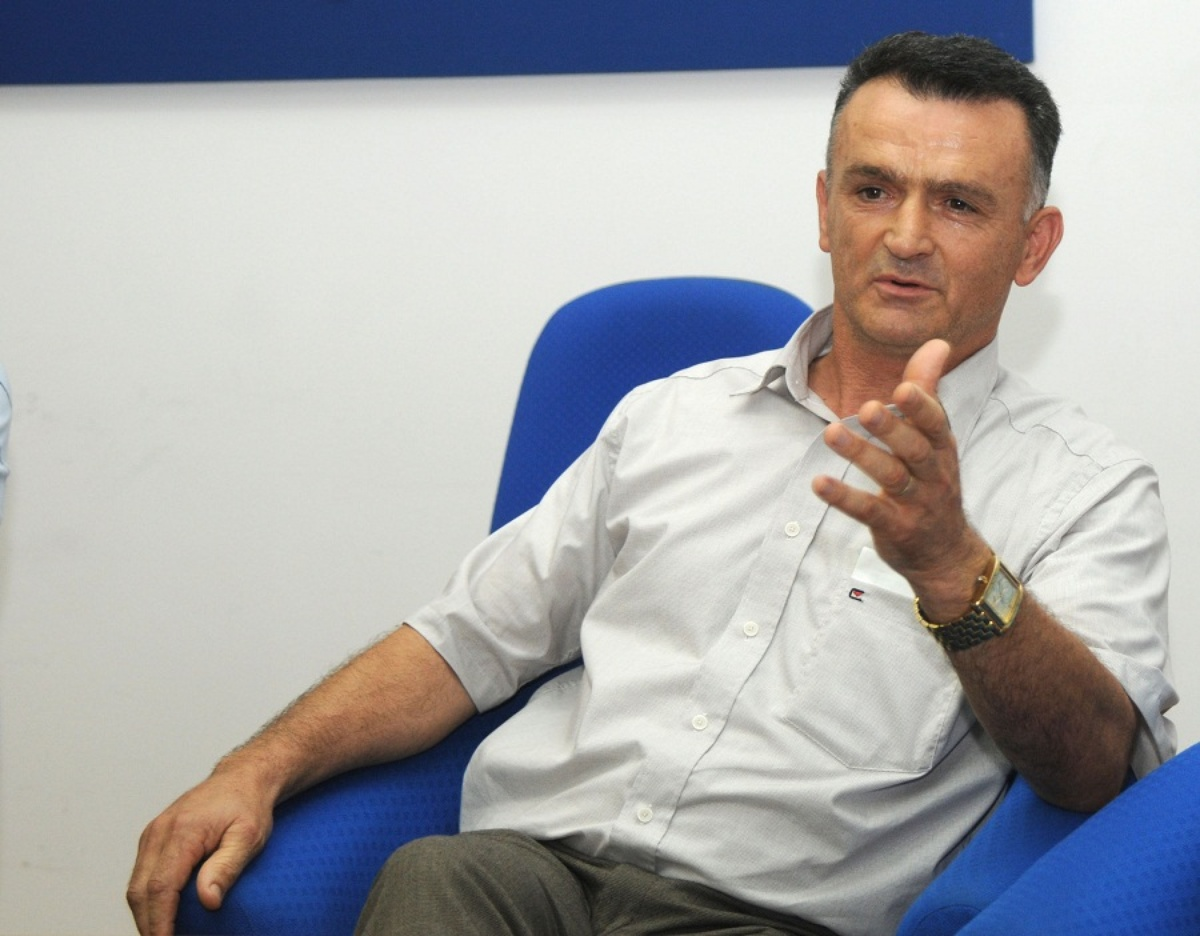
- Zvonko Kalezic in 2016

Personal information
- Full name: Zvonko Kalezić
- Date of birth: 19 September 1957 (age 69)
- Place of birth: Danilovgrad, SFR Yugoslavia
- Position: Midfielder

Senior career*
Years	Team	Apps	(Gls)
1976–1980	Budućnost Titograd	13	(0)
1978–1980	→ OFK Titograd (loan)	15	(4)
1981–1984	Čelik Zenica	32	(5)
1984–1985	Novi Pazar	27	(0)
1985	Radnički Niš	2	(0)
1986	Trepča	14	(5)
1986–1987	Ivangrad	13	(1)
1987–1988	Rudar Ljubija	29	(6)
1988–1989	Borac Banja Luka	29	(1)
1989–1991	Mornar Bar		
- * Club domestic league appearances and goals

Zvonko Kalezić (Serbian Cyrillic: Звонко Калезић, born 19 September 1957) is a Montenegrin retired football midfielder who played in several clubs in Yugoslav First and Second League.

== Club career ==
Born in Jastreb, a location within the municipality of Danilovgrad, he started playing in 1976 in the first-team of Budućnost Titograd. However, after spending two seasons without debuting in the league, he decided to accept a loan deal to OFK Titograd where his younger brother Vasilije was playing. They helped the club achieve promotion to the Yugoslav Second League and both Kalezić brothers stayed further one season at OFK Titograd.

Zvonko returned to Budućnost at summer 1980 and made one appearance with them in the 1980–81 Yugoslav First League. During the winter-break he moved to NK Čelik Zenica playing in the Yugoslav Second League. He played at Zenica until 1984 having been part of the generation that helped the club achieve the promotion to the First League in 1982–83, and played with them in top-league in 1983–84.

In summer 1984 he joined second-level side FK Novi Pazar. In the following years he will have spells in a number of clubs in the Yugoslav Second League, chronologically, Radnički Niš, Trepča, FK Ivangrad, Rudar Pljubija and Borac Banja Luka, before finishing his career by playing in lower-league side Mornar.
