= Arto Tolsa =

Finnish footballer (1945-1989)

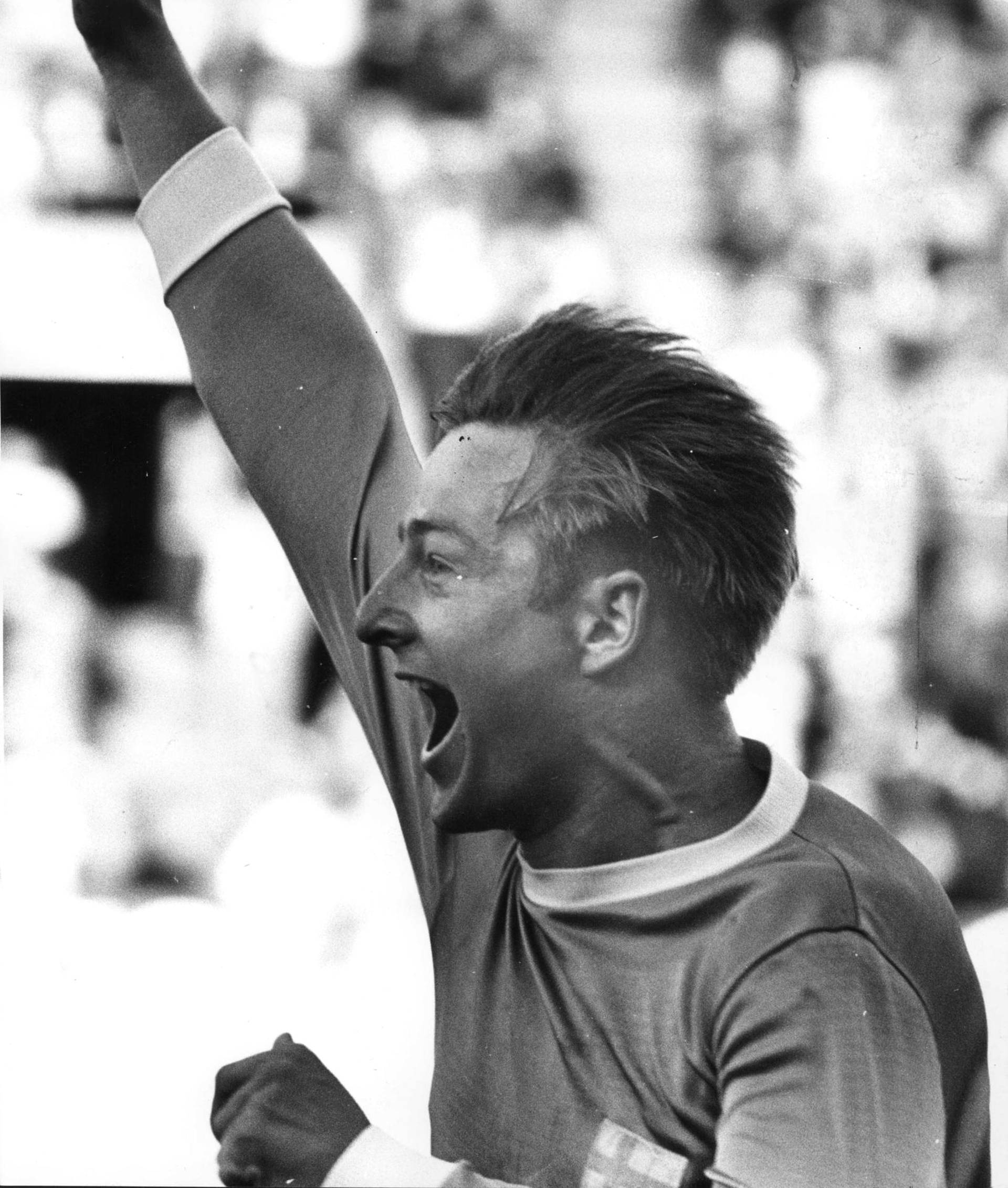

Personal information
- Date of birth: 9 August 1945
- Place of birth: Kotka, Finland
- Date of death: 30 March 1989 (aged 43)
- Place of death: Kotka, Finland
- Positions: Defender; forward; winger

Senior career*
Years	Team	Apps	(Gls)
1962–1969	KTP	152	(151)
1969–1979	Beerschot	200	(14)
1979–1982	KTP	71	(17)
Total		423	(182)

International career
1964–1981	Finland	77	(10)
- * Club domestic league appearances and goals

Arto Vilho Tolsa (9 August 1945 – 30 March 1989) was a Finnish footballer.

== Career ==
Tolsa started his career in his hometown of Kotka, playing for Kotkan Työväen Palloilijat. He was promoted to first team as a 16 year old for 1962 second division season after successful match in a local competition in previous fall. Playing as a striker he scored an impressive 43 goals in 22 matches in his first season. He scored in 21 out 22 to matches in that season and still holds the most goals in a single season record for second level of football in Finland. As an amateur he also worked at the local port. In 1964 he was a top goalscorer in Mestaruussarja. In 1969 he moved to Beerschot and turned professional. In Belgium He first played as a winger but was later transferred to central defender and became one of the key players for his team. He also played as a captain for Beerschot. In his last season for Beerschot he scored a winner in Belgian Cup final. After 1979 he returned to Kotkan Työväen Palloilijat where he ended his career in 1982. During his last years he suffered from alcoholism. He committed suicide in 1989, at the age of 43. Football stadium in Kotka is named after him.

== Career statistics ==
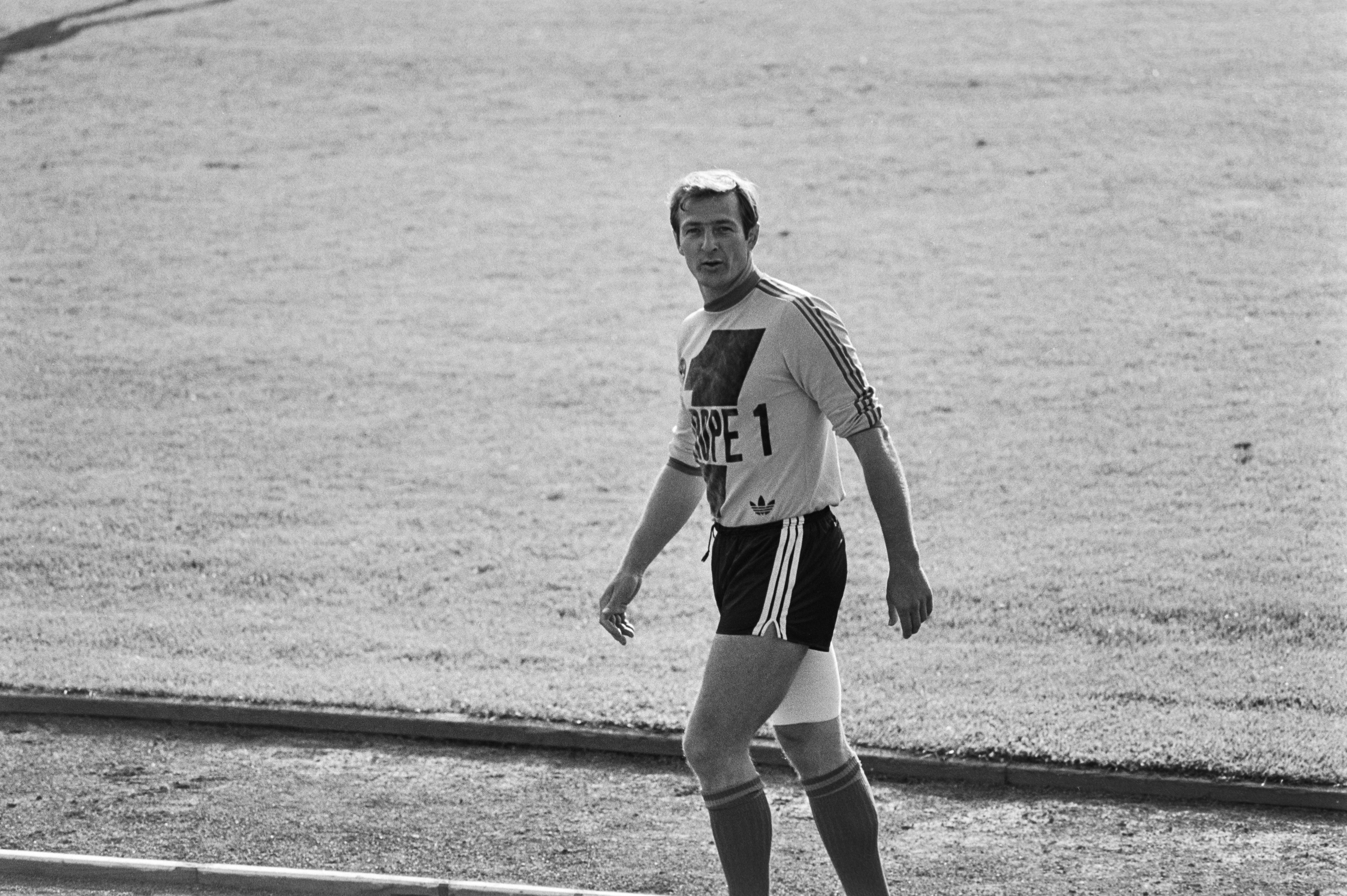
Arto Tolsa at the Kotka Sports Center in 1979

Appearances and goals by club, season and competition
Club	Season	League			Cup		Europe		Total	
Club	Season	Division	Apps	Goals	Apps	Goals	Apps	Goals	Apps	Goals
KTP	1962	Suomensarja	22	43	–		–		22	43
KTP	1963	Mestaruussarja	20	13	–		–		20	13
KTP	1964	Mestaruussarja	19	26	–		–		19	26
KTP	1965	Mestaruussarja	20	16	–		–		20	16
KTP	1966	Mestaruussarja	20	15	–		–		20	15
KTP	1967	Mestaruussarja	18	11	–		–		18	11
KTP	1968	Mestaruussarja	22	19	–		–		22	19
KTP	1969	Mestaruussarja	11	8	–		–		11	8
KTP	Total		152	151	0	0	0	0	152	151
Beerschot	1969–70	Belgian First Division	1	0	–		–		1	0
Beerschot	1970–71	Belgian First Division	13	5	3	2	–		16	7
Beerschot	1971–72	Belgian First Division	22	3	0	0	3 (Note: Appearances in UEFA Cup Winners' Cup)	2	25	5
Beerschot	1972–73	Belgian First Division	30	1	3	0	–		33	1
Beerschot	1973–74	Belgian First Division	30	0	3	0	2 (Note: Appearances in UEFA Cup)	0	35	0
Beerschot	1974–75	Belgian First Division	31	2	1	0	–		32	2
Beerschot	1975–76	Belgian First Division	33	3	0	0	–		33	3
Beerschot	1976–77	Belgian First Division	1	0	–		–		1	0
Beerschot	1977–78	Belgian First Division	14	0	0	0	–		14	0
Beerschot	1978–79	Belgian First Division	28	0	6	0	4 (Note: Appearances in UEFA Intertoto Cup)	0	38	0
Beerschot	Total		203	14	16	2	9	2	228	18
KTP	1979	Mestaruussarja	18	2	–		–		18	2
KTP	1980	Mestaruussarja	26	9	–		–		26	9
KTP	1981	Mestaruussarja	26	6	–		2	0	28	6
KTP	1982	Mestaruussarja	1	0	–		–		1	0
KTP	Total		71	17	0	0	2	0	73	17
Career total			426	183	16	2	11	2	453	187

== Honours ==
KTP

- Finnish Cup: 1967, 1980

Beerschot

- Belgian Cup: 1970–71, 1978–79

Individual

- Mestaruussarja Top Goalscorer: 1964
- Finnish Footballer of the Year: 1971, 1974, 1977
- Finnish Football Hall of Fame inductee

== External links and references ==
- Arto Tolsa at National-Football-Teams.com
- Finland - International Player Records

Specific
