= Jyrki Nieminen =

Finnish footballer (born 1951)

Personal information
- Full name: Jyrki Tapio Nieminen
- Date of birth: 30 March 1951 (age 75)
- Place of birth: Salo, Finland
- Height: 1.80 m (5 ft 11 in)
- Position: Midfielder

Senior career*
Years	Team	Apps	(Gls)
1969–1970	Vilpas Salo		
1970–1972	TPS	13	(1)
1972–1976	Vilpas Salo		
1976–1978	HJK	43	(19)
1978–1979	IFK Eskilstuna	23	(15)
1979–1984	AIK	123	(22)
1984–1985	VanPa-70		
1985–1987	HJK	65	(3)

International career^{‡}
1976–1986	Finland	46	(9)

Managerial career
- 1987: HJK (assistant)
- 1989–1992: Finland women
- 1991: HJK
- * Club domestic league appearances and goals as of 13 September 2017 (UTC) ‡ National team caps and goals as of 13 September 2017 (UTC)

Jyrki Nieminen (born 30 March 1951) is a retired Finnish footballer. Throughout his career he played for clubs in Finland and Sweden and also managed HJK Helsinki.

== Career statistics ==
Appearances and goals by club, season and competition
Club	Season	League			Europe		Total	
Club	Season	Division	Apps	Goals	Apps	Goals	Apps	Goals
TPS Turku	1970	Mestaruussarja	13	1	–		13	1
TPS Turku	1971	Mestaruussarja			–			
TPS Turku	Total		13	1	0	0	13	1
HJK Helsinki	1976	Mestaruussarja	22	12	–		22	12
HJK Helsinki	1977	Mestaruussarja	21	7	–		21	7
HJK Helsinki	Total		43	19	0	0	43	19
IFK Eskilstuna	1978	Swedish Division 2	23	15	–		23	15
AIK	1979	Allsvenskan	25	7	–		25	7
AIK	1980	Swedish Division 2	25	4	–		25	4
AIK	1981	Allsvenskan	26	2	–		26	2
AIK	1982	Allsvenskan	20	2	–		20	2
AIK	1983	Allsvenskan	21	7	–		21	7
AIK	1984	Allsvenskan	3	0	–		3	0
AIK	Total		120	22	0	0	120	22
HJK Helsinki	1985	Mestaruussarja	26	2	3 (Note: Appearances in UEFA Cup Winners' Cup)	0	29	2
HJK Helsinki	1986	Mestaruussarja	20	1	2 (Note: Appearances in European Cup)	0	22	1
HJK Helsinki	1987	Mestaruussarja	19	0	–		19	0
HJK Helsinki	Total		65	3	5	0	70	3
Career total			25	2	0	0	28	2

=== International ===
Appearances and goals by national team and year
National team	Year	Apps	Goals
Finland	1976	6	1
Finland	1977	4	2
Finland	1978	8	2
Finland	1979	8	2
Finland	1980	2	0
Finland	1981	4	0
Finland	1982	2	1
Finland	1983	0	0
Finland	1984	0	0
Finland	1985	9	1
Finland	1986	3	0
Total		46	9
