= Martti Kosma =

Finnish footballer (1927–1999)

Personal information
- Full name: Martti Johannes Kosma
- Date of birth: 24 June 1927
- Place of birth: Sortavala, Finland
- Date of death: 29 July 1999 (aged 77)
- Position: Forward

Senior career*
Years	Team	Apps	(Gls)
- KuPS
1953	Kajaanin Palloilijat		
- KuPS

Managerial career
- KuPS
- Reipas Lahti
- 1975: Finland
- * Club domestic league appearances and goals

Martti Johannes Kosma (26 March 1922 – 29 July 1999) was a Finnish football player and manager.

== Playing career ==
A forward, Kosma began his career at KuPS. In 1953, Kosma moved to Kajaanin Palloilijat, playing for the club for a year, before returning to KuPS.

== Managerial career ==
Following his playing career, Kosma moved into management. In 1958, Kosma managed KuPS to the 1958 Mestaruussarja title. Kosma moved to Reipas Lahti, winning the Mestaruussarja in 1963, 1967 and 1970, as well as the Finnish Cup in 1964. In 1975, Kosma managed the Finland national team for two games.
