= Ari Heikkinen (footballer, born 1964) =

Finnish footballer (born 1964)

Personal information
- Date of birth: 8 April 1964 (age 62)
- Place of birth: Vuolijoki, Finland
- Height: 1.84 m (6 ft 0 in)
- Position: Defender

Youth career
- KaPa

Senior career*
Years	Team	Apps	(Gls)
1980–1983	KaPa		
1984–1989	TPS	126	(4)
1990	Germinal Ekeren	8	(0)
1990–1993	TPS	105	(7)
1994–1998	Haka	99	(5)

International career
1984–1988	Finland U21	11	(0)
1989–1994	Finland	51	(1)
- * Club domestic league appearances and goals as of 1 May 2024

Ari Heikkinen (born 8 April 1964) is a Finnish former professional footballer, who played as a defender. He was capped 51 times for Finland national football team during 1989–1994, scoring one goal in an away game against Poland in 1993.

Heikkinen started playing football with Kajaanin Palloilijat (KaPa) in lower divisions. He has made a total of 309 appearances in Finnish top-tiers Mestaruussarja and Veikkausliiga for Turun Palloseura and Haka, additionally winning two Finnish championship titles with Haka. In 1990, he played for Germinal Ekeren in Belgian First Division.

== Career statistics ==
=== Club ===
Appearances and goals by club, season and competition
Club	Season	League			Cup (Note: Includes Suomen Cup and Belgian Cup)		Europe		Total	
Club	Season	Division	Apps	Goals	Apps	Goals	Apps	Goals	Apps	Goals
TPS	1984	Mestaruussarja	5	0	–		–		5	0
TPS	1985	Mestaruussarja	24	1	–		2 (Note: Appearances in UEFA Cup)	0	26	1
TPS	1986	Mestaruussarja	22	2	–		–		22	2
TPS	1987	Mestaruussarja	22	0	–		4	0	26	0
TPS	1988	Mestaruussarja	26	1	–		6	0	32	1
TPS	1989	Mestaruussarja	27	0	–		–		27	0
TPS	Total		126	4	0	0	12	0	138	4
Germinal Ekeren	1989–90	Belgian First Division	8	0	1	0	–		9	0
TPS	1990	Veikkausliiga	13	0	–		2	0	15	0
TPS	1991	Veikkausliiga	33	4	–		–		33	4
TPS	1992	Veikkausliiga	33	1	–		2 (Note: Appearances in UEFA Cup Winners' Cup)	0	35	1
TPS	1993	Veikkausliiga	27	2	–		–		27	2
TPS	Total		106	7	0	0	4	0	130	7
Haka	1994	Veikkausliiga	20	0	–		–		20	0
Haka	1995	Veikkausliiga	25	0	–		–		25	0
Haka	1996	Veikkausliiga	16	1	–		4	0	20	1
Haka	1997	Ykkönen	21	4	1	0	–		22	4
Haka	1998	Veikkausliiga	17	0	–		4	0	21	0
Haka	Total		99	5	1	0	8	0	108	5
Career total			336	16	2	0	24	0	362	16

=== International ===
Finland
Year	Apps	Goals
1989	13	0
1990	7	0
1991	7	0
1992	5	0
1993	14	1
1994	5	0
Total	51	1

=== International goals ===
As of match played 13 April 1993. Finland score listed first, score column indicates score after each Heikkinen goal.

List of international goals scored by Ari Heikkinen
No.	Date	Venue	Opponent	Score	Result	Competition
1	13 April 1993	Polish Army Stadium, Warsaw, Poland	Poland	1–2	1–2	Friendly

== Honours ==
Haka

- Veikkausliiga: 1995, 1998
- Finnish Cup: 1997
- Ykkönen: 1997

Individual

- Finnish Footballer of the Year: 1989
