= 1950 Mestaruussarja =

Mestaruussarja
- Season: 1950
- Champions: IKissat Tampere
- Relegated: TuWe Turku; Kullervo Helsinki

The 1950 season was the 20th completed season of Finnish Football League Championship, known as the Mestaruussarja.

== Overview ==
The Mestaruussarja was administered by the Finnish Football Association and the competition's 1950 season was contested by 10 teams. IKissat Tampere won the championship and the two lowest placed teams of the competition, TuWe Turku and Kullervo Helsinki, were relegated to the Suomensarja.

== League standings ==
Pos	Team	Pld	W	D	L	GF	GA	GD	Pts
1	IKissat Tampere (C)	18	10	5	3	38	17	+21	25
2	KuPS Kuopio	18	11	0	7	46	39	+7	22
3	VIFK Vaasa	18	7	6	5	38	28	+10	20
4	KTP Kotka	18	7	5	6	36	37	−1	19
5	VPS Vaasa	18	6	6	6	34	33	+1	18
6	KIF Helsinki	18	8	2	8	45	46	−1	18
7	TPS Turku	18	7	3	8	36	37	−1	17
8	Haka Valkeakoski	18	7	3	8	37	46	−9	17
9	TuWe Turku (R)	18	5	4	9	25	34	−9	14
10	Kullervo Helsinki (R)	18	2	6	10	22	40	−18	10

(C) Champions; (R) Relegated

== Results ==
Home \ Away	HAK	IK	KIF	KTP	KUL	KPS	TPS	TW	VIF	VPS
FC Haka		1–4	0–1	3–4	3–0	2–4	7–4	2–1	2–2	2–0
IKissat	1–1		9–1	3–0	3–2	2–0	1–1	2–0	1–1	0–0
KIF	7–1	3–2		6–2	3–0	2–5	1–3	1–1	2–5	7–2
KTP	2–1	2–0	2–0		2–2	3–1	3–3	2–0	1–1	0–0
Kullervo	2–2	0–3	1–2	1–1		2–6	2–0	0–1	2–3	1–1
KuPS	2–4	0–3	5–2	3–2	4–1		4–2	3–2	4–2	0–2
TPS	5–1	0–1	3–2	3–1	1–0	3–0		3–3	0–2	2–1
TuWe	1–2	0–1	1–2	4–7	1–1	4–2	1–0		1–0	3–1
VIFK	4–0	3–0	2–2	2–0	2–3	0–1	3–2	1–1		2–3
VPS	2–3	2–2	2–1	4–2	2–2	1–2	4–1	4–0	3–3	

Legend: Blue = home team win; Yellow = draw; Red = away team win.
