= 1953 Mestaruussarja =

Mestaruussarja
- Season: 1953
- Champions: VIFK Vaasa
- Relegated: VPS Vaasa; KaPa Kajaani

The 1953 season was the 23rd completed season of Finnish Football League Championship, known as the Mestaruussarja.

== Overview ==
The Mestaruussarja was administered by the Finnish Football Association and the competition's 1953 season was contested by 10 teams. VIFK Vaasa won the championship and the two lowest placed teams of the competition, VPS Vaasa and KaPa Kajaani, were relegated to the Suomensarja.

== League standings ==
Pos	Team	Pld	W	D	L	GF	GA	GD	Pts
1	VIFK Vaasa (C, Q)	18	10	4	4	40	23	+17	24
2	Jäntevä Kotka (Q)	18	11	2	5	30	20	+10	24
3	KuPS Kuopio	18	9	3	6	32	25	+7	21
4	Haka Valkeakoski	18	8	3	7	31	32	−1	19
5	Pyrkivä Turku	18	8	2	8	38	29	+9	18
6	HJK Helsinki	18	7	3	8	28	22	+6	17
7	KIF Helsinki	18	6	4	8	28	28	0	16
8	KTP Kotka	18	5	5	8	22	32	−10	15
9	VPS Vaasa (R)	18	5	3	10	26	37	−11	13
10	KaPa Kajaani (R)	18	4	5	9	25	52	−27	13

(C) Champions; (Q) Qualified for the phase indicated; (R) Relegated

== Results ==
Home \ Away	HAK	HJK	JÄN	KPK	KIF	KTP	KPS	PYR	VIF	VPS
FC Haka		1–0	2–3	3–1	2–1	1–1	2–3	2–3	2–1	2–3
HJK	2–0		2–1	6–1	1–2	0–0	1–3	1–1	1–3	3–0
Jäntevä	2–0	2–1		3–0	1–0	3–1	2–3	1–0	2–3	1–0
KaPa	4–1	0–4	1–1		3–2	2–2	1–1	1–6	1–1	2–1
KIF	2–4	2–2	0–2	4–1		1–0	1–1	3–1	3–4	4–0
KTP	1–2	0–0	2–1	1–4	1–1		1–2	3–2	0–2	2–1
KuPS	1–2	0–1	0–2	4–0	3–0	3–1		1–1	1–2	4–1
Pyrkivä	1–2	1–0	3–0	7–1	0–1	0–3	1–0		1–5	3–0
VIFK	1–1	1–1	1–1	3–0	1–0	6–1	1–2	4–3		1–2
VPS	2–2	4–2	1–2	2–2	1–1	1–2	5–0	1–4	1–0	

Legend: Blue = home team win; Yellow = draw; Red = away team win.
