= 1961 Mestaruussarja =

Sports season

Mestaruussarja
- Season: 1961

Statistics of Mestaruussarja in the 1961 season.

== Overview ==
It was contested by 12 teams, and HIFK Helsinki won the championship.

== League standings ==
Pos	Team	Pld	W	D	L	GF	GA	GD	Pts
1	HIFK Helsinki (C)	22	14	3	5	57	26	+31	31
2	KIF Helsinki	22	14	2	6	45	29	+16	30
3	Haka Valkeakoski	22	12	5	5	51	32	+19	29
4	TPS Turku	22	11	2	9	48	49	−1	24
5	Reipas Lahti	22	9	4	9	37	37	0	22
6	HJK Helsinki	22	7	7	8	42	41	+1	21
7	HPS Helsinki	22	9	2	11	49	56	−7	20
8	TaPa Tampere	22	7	6	9	38	48	−10	20
9	KuPS Kuopio	22	8	3	11	40	45	−5	19
10	VIFK Vaasa (R)	22	7	4	11	42	53	−11	18
11	PPojat Helsinki (R)	22	7	3	12	30	41	−11	17
12	TuTo Turku (R)	22	5	3	14	36	58	−22	13

Source: rsssf.com
(C) Champions; (R) Relegated

== Results ==
Home \ Away	HAK	HFK	HJK	HPS	KIF	KPS	PP	REI	TPT	TPS	TTT	VIF
FC Haka		1–0	3–2	2–1	4–0	6–2	0–0	2–0	1–1	0–1	1–1	3–1
HIFK	4–2		3–1	2–0	3–1	6–0	3–1	3–1	2–3	3–2	3–0	1–3
HJK Helsinki	2–2	2–2		2–0	1–1	1–1	2–1	2–2	2–2	1–3	4–0	0–3
HPS	4–2	0–5	1–2		2–2	3–2	0–4	4–2	6–1	5–0	6–3	5–4
KIF	0–3	0–2	2–1	5–0		3–0	3–1	2–0	2–0	3–0	1–0	5–1
KuPS	2–4	1–5	0–0	4–0	0–1		6–0	3–0	1–2	3–4	4–0	2–1
PPojat	1–6	1–2	1–0	3–1	1–2	2–1		1–1	2–0	2–3	1–2	3–2
Reipas	3–1	2–1	1–3	2–2	2–0	2–0	0–2		1–1	0–2	2–1	7–1
TaPa	0–2	0–3	6–4	0–2	3–2	2–2	1–1	1–3		1–3	5–1	2–2
TPS	6–2	0–0	4–1	5–4	2–3	1–2	1–0	1–2	2–4		1–6	3–0
TuTo	0–3	4–4	1–5	2–3	1–3	2–3	2–1	3–0	0–2	4–1		2–4
VIFK	1–1	1–0	2–4	2–0	2–4	0–1	3–1	1–4	4–1	3–3	1–1	

Legend: Blue = home team win; Yellow = draw; Red = away team win.
