= Kullervo Helsinki =

Finnish football club

Helsingin Kullervo
- Full name: Helsingin Kullervo
- Nickname: Kultsi
- Founded: 1919
- Ground: Brahen Kenttä, Helsinki, Finland
- League: Kutonen
Home colours

Helsingin Kullervo (abbreviated Kullervo) is a football club from Helsinki, Finland. The club was formed in 1919. It used to participate in number of sports including Bandy, Ice Hockey, Pesäpallo and Athletics but now concentrates only in Football. The club is a member of the Finnish Workers' Sports Federation, abbreviated as TUL. In its early days, Club was a powerhouse in TUL Sports, they won several TUL championships in Football, Pesäpallo, Bandy and Athletics.

== History in football ==
Kullervo was founded on February 7, 1919, after members who participated in Finnish Civil War as a red guards were expelled from Hermannin Kiista. Football was added to clubs program in 1919, football at that time had been largely middle and upper class sport, working class kids played often on the street but their teams were short lived and most players found it hard to enter clubs run by higher social classes, although KIF had several working class players. In April 1919, Kullervo kept their first football practice in Haapaniemen kenttä. In 1919, they participated in SPL Helsinki District competitions. They were only TUL club that had a football team and needed games to play. A member of Kullervo had been friends with members of SPL Helsinki district, and they were accepted to participate by special permit. Their first match was supposed to be against third team of HIFK, but their opponents were too scared to play and did not show up, apparently fearing retaliation from Finnish Civil War, Kullervo was declared winners by walkover, They finally got to play against third team of KIF, they also faced second team of HJK and Jewish club Stjärnan. In summer of 1919, they were forbidden to continue playing in SPL competitions by TUL. As a result, TUL Clubs from Helsinki District were obligated to form football teams, and soon Ponnistus, Jyry and Visa also had a number of teams. They quickly became a leading football club winning 6 first national TUL Cup. Finnish sports at the time were divided between Finnish Workers' Sports Federation and Finnish National Sports Association, they did not compete against each other and TUL members weren't allowed to represent Finland in national teams. In 1942 and 1945, they participated in Finnish Championship that was played in cup format. In 1943–44 season, they participated in first tier qualifiers but did not qualify and participated second tier instead. In 1948, TUL and Finnish FA leagues were merged and Kullervo qualified to Mestaruussarja.

=== Season to Season ===
Season to Season

Season	Level	Division	Section	Administration	Position	Movements
1943-44	Tier 2	Suomensarja (Second Division)		Finnish FA (Suomen Pallolitto)	7th	
1945-48	Tier 1	Mestaruussarja (Premier League)		TUL (Työväen Urheiluliitto)		
1948	Tier 1	Mestaruussarja (Premier League)		Finnish FA (Suomen Palloliitto)	13th	Relegated
1949	Tier 2	Suomensarja (Second Division)	East Group	Finnish FA (Suomen Pallolitto)	1st	Promoted
1950	Tier 1	Mestaruussarja (Premier League)		Finnish FA (Suomen Palloliitto)	10th	Relegated
1951	Tier 2	Suomensarja (Second Division)	East Group	Finnish FA (Suomen Pallolitto)	4th	
1952	Tier 2	Suomensarja (Second Division)	East Group	Finnish FA (Suomen Pallolitto)	8th	
1953	Tier 2	Suomensarja (Second Division)	East Group	Finnish FA (Suomen Pallolitto)	6th	
1954	Tier 2	Suomensarja (Second Division)	East Group	Finnish FA (Suomen Pallolitto)	9th	
1955	Tier 3	Maakuntasarja (Third Division)	South Group I	Finnish FA (Suomen Pallolitto)	2nd	
1956	Tier 3	Maakuntasarja (Third Division)	South Group I	Finnish FA (Suomen Pallolitto)	2nd	
1957	Tier 3	Maakuntasarja (Third Division)	South Group I	Finnish FA (Suomen Pallolitto)	7th	
1958	Tier 3	Maakuntasarja (Third Division)	Group 1	Finnish FA (Suomen Pallolitto)	5th	
1959	Tier 3	Maakuntasarja (Third Division)	Group 1	Finnish FA (Suomen Pallolitto)	1st	Promotion Playoff -
1960	Tier 3	Maakuntasarja (Third Division)	Group 1	Finnish FA (Suomen Pallolitto)	2nd	
1961	Tier 3	Maakuntasarja (Third Division)	Group 1	Finnish FA (Suomen Pallolitto)	2nd	
1962	Tier 3	Maakuntasarja (Third Division)	Group 1	Finnish FA (Suomen Pallolitto)	5th	
1963	Tier 3	Maakuntasarja (Third Division)	Group 1	Finnish FA (Suomen Pallolitto)	4th	
1964	Tier 3	Maakuntasarja (Third Division)	Group 1	Finnish FA (Suomen Pallolitto)	4th	
1965	Tier 3	Maakuntasarja (Third Division)	Group 1	Finnish FA (Suomen Pallolitto)	3rd	
1966	Tier 3	Maakuntasarja (Third Division)	Group 1	Finnish FA (Suomen Pallolitto)	8th	Relegated
1967	Tier 4	Aluesarja (Fourth Division)	Group 1	Finnish FA (Suomen Pallolitto)	5th	
1968	Tier 4	Aluesarja (Fourth Division)	Group 1	Finnish FA (Suomen Pallolitto)	5th	
1969	Tier 4	Aluesarja (Fourth Division)	Group 2	Finnish FA (Suomen Pallolitto)	3rd	
1970	Tier 4	IV Divisioona (Fourth Division)	Group 1	Finnish FA (Suomen Pallolitto)	4th	
1971	Tier 4	IV Divisioona (Fourth Division)	Group 1	Finnish FA (Suomen Pallolitto)	3rd	
1972	Tier 4	IV Divisioona (Fourth Division)	Group 1	Finnish FA (Suomen Pallolitto)	2nd	Promotion Playoff
1973	Tier 5	IV Divisioona (Fourth Division)	Group 3	Finnish FA (Suomen Pallolitto)	2nd	
1974	Tier 5	IV Divisioona (Fourth Division)	Group 3	Finnish FA (Suomen Pallolitto)	4th	
1975	Tier 5	IV Divisioona (Fourth Division)	Group 4	Finnish FA (Suomen Pallolitto)	4th	
1976	Tier 5	IV Divisioona (Fourth Division)	Group 1	Finnish FA (Suomen Pallolitto)	4th	
1977	Tier 5	IV Divisioona (Fourth Division)	Group 1	Finnish FA (Suomen Pallolitto)	3rd	
1978	Tier 5	IV Divisioona (Fourth Division)	Group 3	Finnish FA (Suomen Pallolitto)	3rd	
1979	Tier 5	IV Divisioona (Fourth Division)	Group 4	Finnish FA (Suomen Pallolitto)	2nd	Promotion playoff
1980	Tier 5	IV Divisioona (Fourth Division)	Group 3	Finnish FA (Suomen Pallolitto)	6th	
1981	Tier 5	IV Divisioona (Fourth Division)	Group 2	Finnish FA (Suomen Pallolitto)	7th	
1982	Tier 5	IV Divisioona (Fourth Division)	Group 1	Finnish FA (Suomen Pallolitto)	5th	
1983	Tier 5	IV Divisioona (Fourth Division)	Group 3	Finnish FA (Suomen Pallolitto)	6th	
1984	Tier 5	IV Divisioona (Fourth Division)	Group 1	Finnish FA (Suomen Pallolitto)	3rd	
1985	Tier 5	IV Divisioona (Fourth Division)	Group 3	Finnish FA (Suomen Pallolitto)	4th	
1986	Tier 5	IV Divisioona (Fourth Division)	Group 1	Finnish FA (Suomen Pallolitto)	10th	
1987	Tier 5	IV Divisioona (Fourth Division)	Group 1	Helsinki District (SPL Helsinki)	2nd	
1988-89	Unknown					
1990	Tier 5	IV Divisioona (Fourth Division)	Group 2	Helsinki District (SPL Helsinki)	4th	
1991	Tier 5	IV Divisioona (Fourth Division)	Group 1	Helsinki District (SPL Helsinki)	11th	Relegated
1992-97	Unknown					
1998	Tier 7	Kutonen (Sixth Division)	Group 4	Helsinki District (SPL Helsinki)		
1999-2003	Unknown					
2004	Tier 8	Seiska (Seventh Division)	Group 4	Helsinki District (SPL Helsinki)	6th	
2005	Tier 8	Seiska (Seventh Division)	Group 1	Helsinki District (SPL Helsinki)	5th	
2006	Tier 8	Seiska (Seventh Division)	Group 1	Helsinki District (SPL Helsinki)	4th	Promoted
2007	Tier 7	Kutonen (Sixth Division)	Group 2	Helsinki District (SPL Helsinki)	9th	
2008	Tier 7	Kutonen (Sixth Division)	Group 3	Helsinki District (SPL Helsinki)	7th	
2009	Tier 7	Kutonen (Sixth Division)	Group 3	Helsinki District (SPL Helsinki)	11th	
2010	Tier 7	Kutonen (Sixth Division)	Group 3	Helsinki District (SPL Helsinki)	7th	
2011	Tier 7	Kutonen (Sixth Division)	Group 3	Helsinki District (SPL Helsinki)	13th	
2012	Tier 7	Kutonen (Sixth Division)	Group 1	Helsinki District (SPL Helsinki)	14th	
2013	Tier 7	Kutonen (Sixth Division)	Group 4	Helsinki District (SPL Helsinki)	12th	
2014	Tier 7	Kutonen (Sixth Division)	Group 2	Helsinki District (SPL Helsinki)	16th	
2015	Tier 8	Seiska (Seventh Division)	Group 1	Helsinki District (SPL Helsinki)	8th	
2016	Tier 8	Seiska (Seventh Division)		Helsinki District (SPL Helsinki)	9th	
2017	Tier 8	Seiska (Seventh Division)		Helsinki District (SPL Helsinki)	4th	
2018	Tier 8	Seiska (Seventh Division)		Helsinki District (SPL Helsinki)	17th	
2019	Tier 8	Seiska (Seventh Division)	Group 1	Helsinki District (SPL Helsinki)	7th	

- 2 seasons in Mestaruussarja
- 6 seasons in Suomensarja
- 12 seasons in Maakuntasarja
- 6 seasons in Aluesarja
- 17 seasons in Nelonen
- 9 seasons in Kutonen
- 8 seasons in Seiska
