= 1975 Mestaruussarja =

Mestaruussarja
- Season: 1975

Statistics of Mestaruussarja in the 1975 season.

== Overview ==
It was contested by 12 teams, and TPS Turku won the championship.

== League standings ==
Pos	Team	Pld	W	D	L	GF	GA	GD	Pts
1	TPS Turku (C)	22	13	6	3	34	18	+16	32
2	KuPS Kuopio	22	12	6	4	40	24	+16	30
3	KPV Kokkola	22	11	5	6	31	21	+10	27
4	MiPK Mikkeli	22	10	6	6	40	27	+13	26
5	KPT Kuopio	22	10	6	6	32	22	+10	26
6	Reipas Lahti	22	10	3	9	47	35	+12	23
7	VPS Vaasa	22	8	6	8	29	28	+1	22
8	HJK Helsinki	22	8	2	12	29	37	−8	18
9	MP Mikkeli	22	6	6	10	23	36	−13	18
10	Haka Valkeakoski (O)	22	6	3	13	21	36	−15	15
11	OTP Oulu (Q, R)	22	5	5	12	19	38	−19	15
12	MyPa Anjalankoski (R)	22	4	4	14	22	45	−23	12

Source: rsssf.com
(C) Champions; (O) Play-off winners; (Q) Qualified for the phase indicated; (R) Relegated

== Results ==
Home \ Away	HAK	HJK	KPT	KPV	KPS	MPK	MP	MYP	OTP	REI	TPS	VPS
FC Haka		1–1	0–1	1–2	0–1	2–0	2–0	2–1	1–2	0–2	0–1	1–1
HJK Helsinki	1–2		3–1	2–0	0–2	2–3	3–2	2–0	1–2	4–1	1–4	2–1
KPT	3–0	3–0		1–0	1–1	2–0	0–3	1–1	2–0	2–0	1–1	2–2
KPV	0–0	4–1	0–2		0–0	3–0	3–0	3–1	0–0	2–2	1–0	2–1
KuPS	2–1	5–0	0–2	3–1		2–1	2–2	4–1	3–0	2–0	1–3	2–1
MiPK	3–0	0–0	0–2	4–1	2–2		1–1	3–0	4–0	3–2	1–1	2–0
MP	3–1	0–2	1–0	0–2	0–2	1–1		2–1	2–2	2–1	0–3	0–3
MyPa	1–3	0–3	1–1	2–0	0–1	1–3	3–0		1–0	2–5	0–0	2–0
OTP	1–2	2–0	2–1	0–1	0–0	0–3	1–1	4–1		1–1	0–1	0–2
Reipas	2–1	1–0	3–3	0–2	4–2	3–2	0–1	4–0	8–2		4–0	1–2
TPS	4–0	1–0	3–1	1–4	3–1	1–1	2–1	1–1	2–0	1–0		1–0
VPS	4–1	2–1	1–0	0–0	2–2	1–3	1–1	3–2	1–0	1–3	0–0	

Legend: Blue = home team win; Yellow = draw; Red = away team win.

== Attendances ==
No.	Club	Average
1	HJK	3,489
2	TPS	3,315
3	MiPK	3,293
4	KuPS	2,832
5	Koparit	2,725
6	Reipas	2,549
7	KPV	2,259
8	MyPa	2,214
9	MP	2,179
10	OTP	2,157
11	VPS	1,976
12	Haka	1,404
