= Matti Sundelin =

Finnish footballer (1934–2025)

Matti Sundelin (4 December 1934 – 5 December 2025) was a Finnish footballer who played as a forward.

== Biography ==
Sundelin was born in Turku on 4 December 1934. At club level, he played for TPS. He scored 30 goals in the 1960 Mestaruussarja season, which is still the record for top-tier football in Finland. In the same season, he scored seven goals against IF Drott, which is still the record number of goals scored in a single top-tier football match in Finland. He earned five caps at international level between 1956 and 1960, scoring two goals.

Sundelin died on 5 December 2025, at the age of 91.

== Honours ==
TPS

- Mestaruussarja: 1938, 1939, 1941, 1945

Individual

- Mestaruussarja top scorer: 1957, 1959, 1960
