= Mikko Viitikko =

Finnish footballer (born 1995)

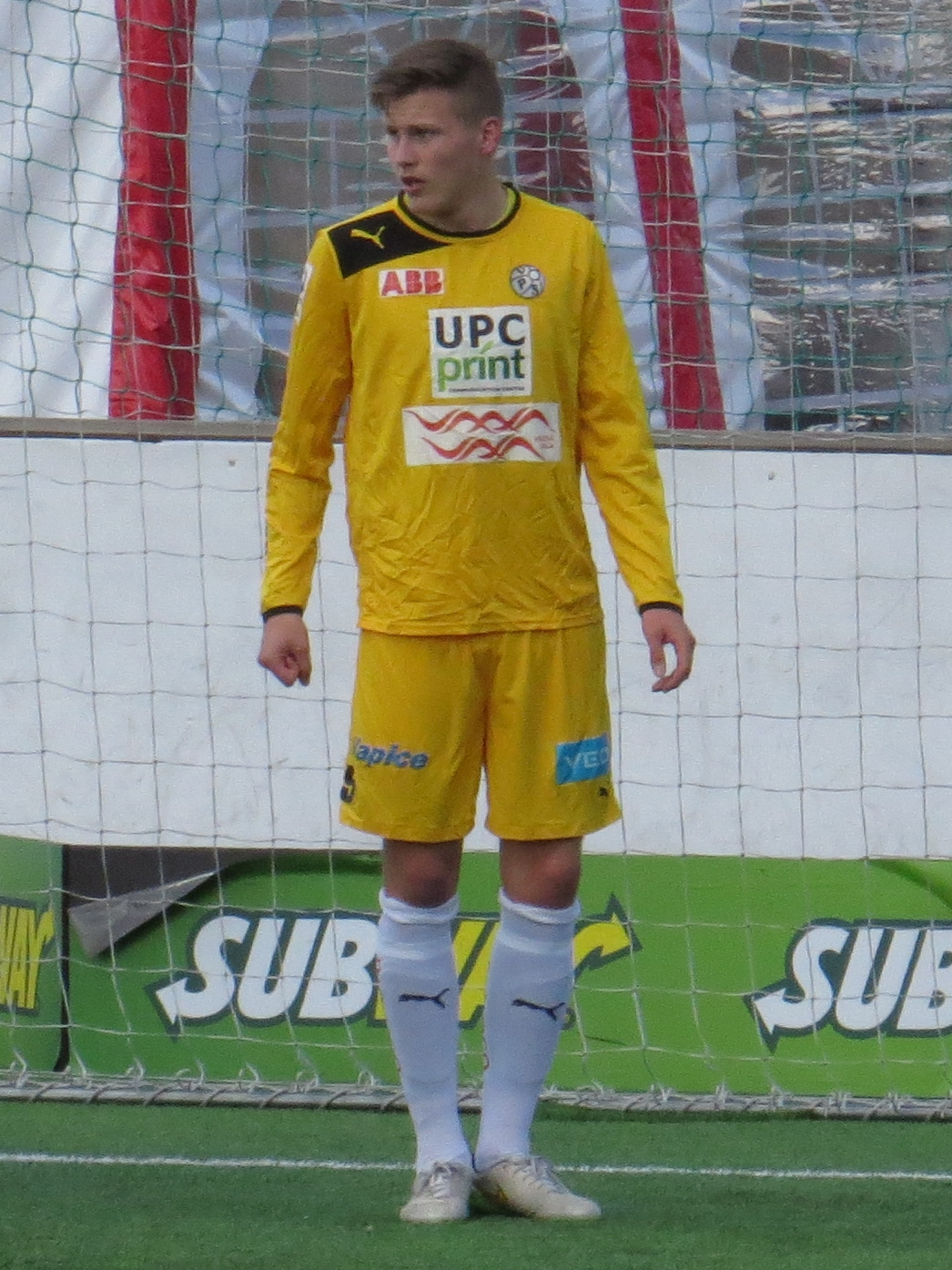
- Viitikko with VPS in 2015.

Personal information
- Full name: Mikko Ville Olavi Viitikko
- Date of birth: 18 April 1995 (age 31)
- Place of birth: Helsinki, Finland
- Height: 1.90 m (6 ft 3 in)
- Position: Centre back

Team information
- Current team: PPJ Lauttasaari

Senior career*
Years	Team	Apps	(Gls)
2011–2014	Klubi 04	43	(3)
2014	HJK	3	(0)
2015–2017	VPS	53	(0)
2018	Fredrikstad	1	(0)
2019–2021	Lahti	65	(1)
2022–2024	Trelleborg	28	(0)
2024	→ Lahti (loan)	21	(0)
2025–	PPJ Lauttasaari	0	(0)

International career^{‡}
2011	Finland U17	2	(0)
2013	Finland U19	3	(0)
2016	Finland U21	3	(0)
- * Club domestic league appearances and goals as of 27 October 2024 ‡ National team caps and goals as of 20 November 2023

Mikko Ville Olavi Viitikko (born 18 April 1995) is a Finnish footballer who plays as a defender for PPJ Lauttasaari in Kolmonen.

== Club career ==
Viitikko comes from the youth academies of HJK Helsinki. HJK promoted Viitikko to their reserve team Klubi 04 for the 2011 season.

Viitikko made his first appearance in Veikkausliiga on 2 August 2014, paying for HJK in a 1–0 victory against Myllykosken Pallo-47 . He was included in the starting eleven in that match and played full 90 minutes.

In November 2014, Viitikko signed a two-and-a-half-year contract with Vaasan Palloseura.

In 2018, Viitikko signed for Norwegian club Fredrikstad FK. After a year in Norway, Viitikko came back to Finland to play for Lahti.

On 4 February 2022, Viitikko signed a contract with Trelleborg in Sweden until 2025, for a transfer fee of around €100,000.

On 20 November 2023, Viitikko was loaned out to FC Lahti for the 2024 season. At the end of the season, Lahti was relegated and Viitikko's loan deal ended. Eventually he ended also his professional career due to lack of motivation and turned into a car salesman.

In 2025, he joined PPJ/Lauttasaari, an amateur team of PPJ in Lauttasaari neighbourhood, competing in the fifth-tier Kolmonen.

== International career ==
Viitikko was a Finnish youth international.

== Career statistics ==
As of 27 October 2024.

Appearances and goals by club, season and competition
Club	Season	League			Cup (Note: Includes Suomen Cup, Norwegian Cup and Svenska Cupen)		League cup (Note: Includes Finnish League Cup)		Europe		Total	
Club	Season	Division	Apps	Goals	Apps	Goals	Apps	Goals	Apps	Goals	Apps	Goals
Klubi 04	2012	Kakkonen	13	0	2	0	–		–		15	0
Klubi 04	2013	Kakkonen	23	2	2	0	–		–		25	2
Klubi 04	2014	Kakkonen	6	1	–		–		–		6	1
Klubi 04	Total		42	3	4	0	0	0	0	0	46	3
HJK Helsinki	2014	Veikkausliiga	3	0	1	0	–		0	0	4	0
VPS	2015	Veikkausliiga	14	0	1	0	5	0	1 (Note: Appearances in UEFA Europa League)	0	21	0
VPS	2016	Veikkausliiga	14	0	2	0	3	0	–		19	0
VPS	2017	Veikkausliiga	25	0	6	0	–		4	0	35	0
VPS	Total		53	0	9	0	8	0	5	0	75	0
Fredrikstad	2018	2. divisjon	1	0	0	0	–		–		1	0
Fredrikstad 2	2018	4. divisjon	13	0	–		–		–		13	0
Lahti	2019	Veikkausliiga	24	0	6	0	–		–		30	0
Lahti	2020	Veikkausliiga	21	1	7	1	–		–		28	2
Lahti	2021	Veikkausliiga	21	0	1	0	–		–		22	0
Lahti	Total		66	1	14	1	0	0	0	0	80	2
Trelleborg	2022	Superettan	17	0	1	0	–		–		18	0
Trelleborg	2023	Superettan	11	0	4	0	–		–		15	0
Trelleborg	Total		28	0	5	0	0	0	0	0	33	0
Lahti (loan)	2024	Veikkausliiga	21	0	3	0	5	0	–		29	0
PPJ Lauttasaari	2025	Kolmonen	0	0	0	0	–		–		0	0
Career total			227	4	26	1	13	0	5	0	271	5
