= 1951 Mestaruussarja =

Finnish 1951 football season

Mestaruussarja
- Season: 1951
- Champions: KTP Kotka
- Relegated: Sudet Helsinki; IKissat Tampere

The 1951 season was the 21st completed season of Finnish Football League Championship, known as the Mestaruussarja.

== Overview ==
The Mestaruussarja was administered by the Finnish Football Association and the competition's 1951 season was contested by 10 teams. KTP Kotka won the championship and the two lowest placed teams of the competition, Sudet Helsinki and IKissat Tampere, were relegated to the Suomensarja.

== League standings ==
Pos	Team	Pld	W	D	L	GF	GA	GD	Pts
1	KTP Kotka (C)	18	10	7	1	44	26	+18	27
2	VIFK Vaasa	18	10	6	2	45	24	+21	26
3	TPK Turku	18	8	7	3	40	25	+15	23
4	Haka Valkeakoski	18	7	5	6	38	32	+6	19
5	KuPS Kuopio	18	8	2	8	38	35	+3	18
6	TPS Turku	18	7	4	7	41	41	0	18
7	KIF Helsinki	18	8	2	8	40	42	−2	18
8	VPS Vaasa	18	5	7	6	34	31	+3	17
9	Sudet Helsinki (R)	18	3	3	12	18	52	−34	9
10	IKissat Tampere (R)	18	1	3	14	17	47	−30	5

(C) Champions; (R) Relegated

== Results ==
Home \ Away	HAK	IK	KIF	KTP	KPS	SUD	TPK	TPS	VIF	VPS
FC Haka		1–1	2–0	1–1	1–4	3–0	2–4	1–3	1–2	1–1
IKissat	1–5		1–3	1–2	1–2	1–2	0–1	1–3	1–6	3–1
KIF	3–1	4–1		3–3	1–4	5–0	0–3	5–3	1–0	4–8
KTP	2–0	3–0	3–1		4–2	2–1	3–2	5–1	2–3	1–1
KuPS	1–2	2–0	2–5	2–3		7–2	1–0	2–1	1–4	0–0
Sudet	0–0	4–3	1–3	1–3	1–0		1–5	0–5	1–2	0–3
TPK	3–3	1–1	4–0	2–2	3–0	2–1		2–2	1–1	3–3
TPS	4–7	4–0	2–1	2–2	4–5	1–1	1–0		1–1	2–3
VIFK	1–5	2–0	1–1	2–2	1–1	6–1	3–3	4–0		4–1
VPS	1–2	1–1	3–0	1–1	3–2	1–1	1–2	1–2	1–2	

Legend: Blue = home team win; Yellow = draw; Red = away team win.
