= 1974 Mestaruussarja =

Mestaruussarja
- Season: 1974

The 1974 Mestaruussarja, the premier division of Finnish football, was contested by 12 teams, and KuPS won the championship.

== Overview ==
It was contested by 12 teams, and KuPS Kuopio won the championship.

== League standings ==
Pos	Team	Pld	W	D	L	GF	GA	GD	Pts
1	KuPS Kuopio (C)	22	13	7	2	62	30	+32	33
2	Reipas Lahti	22	14	2	6	49	26	+23	30
3	HJK Helsinki	22	12	4	6	43	27	+16	28
4	MiPK Mikkeli	22	10	6	6	29	27	+2	26
5	KPT Kuopio	22	9	4	9	30	30	0	22
6	TPS Turku	22	9	3	10	34	31	+3	21
7	OTP Oulu	22	7	6	9	29	34	−5	20
8	Haka Valkeakoski	22	6	8	8	34	40	−6	20
9	KPV Kokkola	22	7	6	9	24	38	−14	20
10	MP Mikkeli	22	7	5	10	24	36	−12	19
11	Kuusysi Lahti (R)	22	4	7	11	22	41	−19	15
12	IKissat Tampere (R)	22	3	4	15	26	46	−20	10

Source: rsssf.com
(C) Champions; (R) Relegated

== Results ==
Home \ Away	HAK	HJK	IKT	KPT	KPV	KPS	KUU	MPK	MP	OTP	REI	TPS
FC Haka		0–2	1–0	3–3	6–1	3–3	2–2	0–0	2–1	1–1	1–2	3–2
HJK Helsinki	3–1		0–0	1–2	3–0	2–4	2–2	3–0	0–2	3–1	3–1	2–1
IKissat	0–1	3–4		1–2	0–2	1–5	1–2	0–1	3–0	3–0	0–2	1–4
KPT	2–1	0–4	0–0		3–0	0–0	0–0	0–2	0–1	4–1	2–1	0–2
KPV	3–0	1–1	1–1	1–3		2–4	2–1	2–0	0–0	3–0	0–2	1–0
KuPS	4–1	0–5	2–1	3–1	8–0		4–0	2–0	4–3	1–1	4–4	3–3
Kuusysi	0–2	0–1	4–3	0–4	1–1	1–1		3–1	0–0	1–3	0–2	1–4
MiPK	1–1	2–1	2–2	1–0	1–1	0–2	3–2		3–1	1–1	2–1	1–0
MP	1–1	1–1	2–1	2–0	1–0	0–4	1–0	2–3		1–4	1–3	1–2
OTP	3–1	2–0	2–4	3–0	0–0	1–1	0–0	0–3	0–2		3–0	0–2
Reipas	5–2	3–0	4–0	3–0	3–1	1–0	4–1	0–0	5–1	1–3		1–2
TPS	1–1	1–2	5–1	0–4	0–2	0–3	0–1	3–2	0–0	2–0	0–1	

Legend: Blue = home team win; Yellow = draw; Red = away team win.

== Attendances ==
No.	Club	Average
1	HJK	3,481
2	Reipas	3,403
3	OTP	3,215
4	KuPS	2,934
5	MiPK	2,909
6	TPS	2,624
7	MP	2,098
8	KPV	2,091
9	KPT	1,740
10	Kuusysi	1,492
11	Haka	1,454
12	IKissat	1,421
