= 1959 Mestaruussarja =

Mestaruussarja
- Season: 1959

Statistics of Mestaruussarja in the 1959 season.

== Overview ==
It was contested by 10 teams, and HIFK Helsinki won the championship.

== League standings ==
Pos	Team	Pld	W	D	L	GF	GA	GD	Pts
1	HIFK Helsinki (C)	18	11	5	2	43	26	+17	27
2	RU-38 Pori	18	10	5	3	40	28	+12	25
3	Haka Valkeakoski	18	8	5	5	35	25	+10	21
4	KuPS Kuopio	18	9	3	6	37	30	+7	21
5	HPS Helsinki	18	7	3	8	38	32	+6	17
6	TPS Turku	18	6	4	8	50	51	−1	16
7	VIFK Vaasa	18	5	5	8	29	35	−6	15
8	HJK Helsinki	18	4	5	9	28	39	−11	13
9	PPojat Helsinki	18	4	5	9	26	39	−13	13
10	GBK Kokkola (R)	18	4	4	10	29	50	−21	12

Source: rsssf.com
(C) Champions; (R) Relegated

== Results ==
Home \ Away	GBK	HAK	HFK	HJK	HPS	KPS	PP	RU38	TPS	VIF
GBK		1–4	2–1	1–1	1–1	2–2	2–0	1–5	4–3	1–3
FC Haka	3–0		2–2	3–1	4–0	1–0	3–2	1–2	3–2	4–1
HIFK	3–1	3–1		1–0	2–1	4–3	4–1	3–0	5–5	2–2
HJK Helsinki	5–2	3–3	0–2		1–1	6–0	1–0	0–2	2–2	6–2
HPS	2–0	1–0	2–3	4–0		1–3	3–3	4–0	1–2	6–3
KuPS	2–3	2–0	3–0	2–1	3–1		2–0	2–0	7–2	1–1
PPojat	1–5	0–0	1–1	2–0	0–3	4–0		1–5	1–7	0–2
RU-38	5–3	1–1	1–1	1–1	3–2	2–2	1–1		5–3	2–0
TPS	5–4	2–0	1–4	6–0	2–5	0–2	3–3	1–3		2–0
VIFK	0–0	2–2	0–2	5–0	2–0	2–1	1–2	1–2	2–2	

Legend: Blue = home team win; Yellow = draw; Red = away team win.
