= 1944 Mestaruussarja – Finnish League Championship =

Mestaruussarja
- Season: 1944
- Champions: VIFK Vaasa
- Relegated: HJK Helsinki; KPT Kuopio
- Top goalscorer: Urho Teräs, TPS Turku; Leo Turunen, HJK Helsinki (14)

The 1944 season was the 14th completed season of Finnish Football League Championship, known as the Mestaruussarja.

== Overview ==
The 1944 Mestaruussarja was contested by 8 teams, with VIFK Vaasa winning the championship.

== League table ==
Pos	Team	Pld	W	D	L	GF	GA	GD	Pts
1	VIFK Vaasa (C)	7	4	1	2	17	14	+3	9
2	TPS Turku	7	4	1	2	27	12	+15	9
3	Sudet Viipuri	7	4	1	2	12	11	+1	9
4	KIF Helsinki	7	3	2	2	15	12	+3	8
5	HIFK Helsinki	7	2	3	2	13	13	0	7
6	VPS Vaasa	7	3	1	3	15	22	−7	7
7	HJK Helsinki	7	1	2	4	20	22	−2	4
8	KPT Kuopio	7	1	1	5	9	22	−13	3

(C) Champions

Two bankruptcies. Consequently, they acted as the two relegations.

== Results ==
Home \ Away	HFK	HJK	KIF	KPT	SUD	TPS	VIF	VPS
HIFK			3–3	1–2			1–1	
HJK	2–4		2–3		1–1	3–4		2–4
KIF				4–1		3–1		
KPT		4–4			1–2	0–5	1–2	
Sudet	2–0		2–1			2–0	2–5	
TPS	2–2						3–1	12–1
VIFK		2–6	2–0					
VPS	1–2		1–1	4–0	3–1		1–4	

Legend: Blue = home team win; Yellow = draw; Red = away team win.
