= 1962 Mestaruussarja =

Mestaruussarja
- Season: 1962

Statistics of Mestaruussarja in the 1962 season.

== Overview ==
It was contested by 12 teams, and Haka Valkeakoski won the championship.

== League standings ==
Pos	Team	Pld	W	D	L	GF	GA	GD	Pts
1	Haka Valkeakoski (C)	22	15	2	5	63	34	+29	32
2	Reipas Lahti	22	9	9	4	47	33	+14	27
3	TaPa Tampere	22	10	6	6	51	38	+13	26
4	Mikkelin Pallo-Kissat	22	9	6	7	43	32	+11	24
5	KuPS Kuopio	22	7	9	6	35	28	+7	23
6	HPS Helsinki	22	8	7	7	41	42	−1	23
7	HIFK Helsinki	22	8	6	8	34	37	−3	22
8	TPS Turku	22	8	5	9	43	36	+7	21
9	KIF Helsinki	22	7	6	9	40	41	−1	20
10	VPS Vaasa (R)	22	7	4	11	23	37	−14	18
11	HJK Helsinki (R)	22	6	4	12	33	57	−24	16
12	HIK Hanko (R)	22	3	6	13	46	84	−38	12

Source: rsssf.com
(C) Champions; (R) Relegated

== Results ==
Home \ Away	HAK	HFK	HIK	HJK	HPS	KIF	KPS	MPK	REI	TPT	TPS	VPS
FC Haka		6–0	4–4	4–1	2–0	2–3	2–1	2–1	0–1	0–3	3–1	2–1
HIFK	4–3		6–1	2–1	0–0	0–4	2–0	0–1	2–2	1–2	0–1	2–1
HIK	2–4	1–1		1–5	2–3	4–1	1–5	0–0	3–3	2–2	1–1	6–3
HJK Helsinki	2–4	2–1	0–5		1–4	1–2	2–2	0–2	3–1	1–0	2–1	0–3
HPS	1–0	0–4	3–1	3–3		2–1	1–0	2–3	7–2	1–2	2–2	3–1
KIF	3–6	1–2	6–4	4–0	1–1		2–2	1–1	0–0	0–5	1–2	0–0
KuPS	1–3	4–0	2–1	1–0	1–1	3–1		1–1	1–1	2–2	1–1	2–0
MiPK	1–7	2–2	12–1	2–3	2–0	1–1	1–1		0–3	1–2	1–0	5–0
Reipas	1–1	4–2	4–2	7–1	2–2	2–0	0–0	1–0		7–3	1–1	0–2
TaPa	1–2	1–1	8–3	2–2	4–2	2–6	1–0	5–0	1–1		2–2	2–0
TPS	2–3	0–2	8–1	5–2	7–2	1–0	2–3	0–3	1–4	2–1		3–0
VPS	0–3	0–0	3–0	1–1	1–1	2–0	1–4	0–3	1–0	2–0	1–0	

Legend: Blue = home team win; Yellow = draw; Red = away team win.
