= 1960 Mestaruussarja =

Mestaruussarja
- Season: 1960
- Champions: Haka Valkeakoski
- Relegated: RU-38; TKT Tampere; Drott Pietarsaari
- European Cup: Haka Valkeakoski
- Matches: 132
- Goals: 574 (4.35 per match)

Statistics of Mestaruussarja in the 1960 season.

== Overview ==
It was contested by 12 teams, and Haka Valkeakoski won the championship.

== League standings ==
Pos	Team	Pld	W	D	L	GF	GA	GD	Pts
1	Haka Valkeakoski (C)	22	20	1	1	78	23	+55	41
2	TPS Turku	22	13	2	7	72	43	+29	28
3	KIF Helsinki	22	12	3	7	51	41	+10	27
4	HPS Helsinki	22	10	6	6	51	38	+13	26
5	HIFK Helsinki	22	9	5	8	57	43	+14	23
6	KuPS Kuopio	22	8	7	7	47	47	0	23
7	PPojat Helsinki	22	10	3	9	41	47	−6	23
8	VIFK Vaasa	22	7	5	10	41	49	−8	19
9	HJK Helsinki	22	5	8	9	44	51	−7	18
10	RU-38 Pori (R)	22	6	5	11	31	45	−14	17
11	TKT Tampere (R)	22	4	2	16	35	82	−47	10
12	Drott Pietarsaari (R)	22	2	5	15	26	65	−39	9

Source: rsssf.com
(C) Champions; (R) Relegated

== Results ==
Home \ Away	DRO	HAK	HFK	HJK	HPS	KIF	KPS	PP	RU38	TKT	TPS	VIF
Drott		1–1	2–3	1–1	0–5	3–3	1–6	0–3	0–0	3–0	1–6	2–1
FC Haka	4–3		2–1	2–0	4–0	5–0	6–1	3–1	4–2	3–2	7–1	2–1
HIFK	4–0	1–4		2–2	4–4	0–1	0–1	0–0	6–0	5–2	2–1	6–0
HJK Helsinki	2–1	2–4	4–4		2–1	1–2	2–2	0–3	3–0	9–4	0–4	2–2
HPS	2–1	1–2	4–1	5–2		3–0	2–1	0–1	4–0	5–2	4–3	2–1
KIF	3–0	1–5	4–0	3–2	4–1		0–1	0–1	3–1	2–0	3–2	5–1
KuPS	4–1	2–1	2–2	1–1	1–1	1–1		5–1	4–1	8–1	1–5	0–3
PPojat	4–3	2–5	0–2	2–4	1–1	4–4	3–1		3–1	1–4	4–2	2–4
RU-38	1–0	1–3	4–1	0–0	1–1	0–4	5–0	3–0		2–0	2–4	4–1
TKT	5–3	0–5	1–8	2–0	2–2	1–5	2–2	0–2	2–1		0–5	3–4
TPS	7–0	0–2	4–2	4–3	2–2	4–2	6–1	1–2	2–2	3–1		2–1
VIFK	0–0	0–4	1–3	2–2	3–1	5–1	2–2	4–1	0–0	4–1	1–4	

Legend: Blue = home team win; Yellow = draw; Red = away team win.
