= 1977 Mestaruussarja =

Mestaruussarja
- Season: 1977

This page provides statistics of the Mestaruussarja, the premier division of Finnish football, for the 1977 season.

== Overview ==
It was contested by 12 teams, and Haka Valkeakoski won the championship.

== League standings ==
Pos	Team	Pld	W	D	L	GF	GA	GD	Pts
1	Haka Valkeakoski (C)	22	15	3	4	43	15	+28	33
2	KuPS Kuopio	22	12	2	8	40	35	+5	26
3	TPS Turku	22	10	5	7	43	25	+18	25
4	OPS Oulu	22	9	6	7	27	24	+3	24
5	Reipas Lahti	22	8	7	7	27	22	+5	23
6	KPV Kokkola	22	10	3	9	32	28	+4	23
7	HJK Helsinki	22	9	5	8	27	25	+2	23
8	Kiffen Helsinki	22	8	6	8	37	29	+8	22
9	MiPK Mikkeli	22	8	5	9	24	24	0	21
10	OTP Oulu	22	9	3	10	24	34	−10	21
11	MP Mikkeli (R)	22	6	3	13	22	40	−18	15
12	VPS Vaasa (R)	22	2	4	16	18	63	−45	8

Source: rsssf.com
(C) Champions; (R) Relegated

== Results ==
Home \ Away	HAK	HJK	KIF	KPV	KPS	MPK	MP	OPS	OTP	REI	TPS	VPS
FC Haka		2–1	2–1	4–0	3–0	2–0	5–3	5–1	0–1	3–1	0–0	3–0
HJK Helsinki	1–0		0–3	0–5	0–1	2–0	1–1	2–1	1–0	0–3	0–0	4–0
Kiffen	0–0	1–0		1–2	1–2	6–1	3–1	1–1	2–0	1–1	3–1	3–1
KPV	1–0	2–3	3–4		1–2	2–0	2–0	1–0	0–1	1–0	1–1	2–0
KuPS	1–2	0–2	3–2	5–1		2–3	2–0	1–2	2–0	2–0	1–7	6–0
MiPK	0–1	0–1	1–0	0–0	2–1		1–0	0–0	0–1	1–1	4–0	7–0
MP	0–3	1–0	0–0	2–1	1–3	0–1		0–1	4–2	0–2	1–0	1–0
OPS	2–3	1–1	1–0	1–3	5–0	0–0	1–3		2–1	2–0	1–0	2–0
OTP	2–1	1–1	1–1	0–3	0–1	3–2	1–0	0–0		1–2	0–3	4–2
Reipas	0–3	0–0	1–1	1–0	1–1	0–0	5–1	1–0	1–2		1–0	4–0
TPS	0–0	2–1	5–2	2–0	1–1	2–0	4–1	1–2	5–0	2–1		5–1
VPS	0–1	1–6	2–1	1–1	1–3	0–1	2–2	1–1	1–3	1–1	4–2	

Legend: Blue = home team win; Yellow = draw; Red = away team win.

== Attendances ==
No.	Club	Average
1	KuPS	2,935
2	KIF	2,806
3	HJK	2,438
4	Reipas	2,270
5	Haka	2,189
6	MiKi	1,854
7	KPV	1,712
8	MP	1,641
9	OPS	1,566
10	TPS	1,412
11	OTP	1,368
12	VPS	892
