= 1936 Suomensarja – Finnish League Division 2 =

Suomensarja
- Season: 1936
- Champions: VIFK Vaasa
- Promoted: VIFK Vaasa; UL Turku

These are statistics for the first season of the Suomensarja held in 1936.

== Overview ==
The 1936 Suomensarja was contested by 13 teams divided into 2 regional sections. The 2 top teams from each section then participated in a promotion play-off group with VIFK Vaasa and UL Turku eventually gaining promotion with the former finishing as champions.

== League tables ==
=== Itäsarja (Eastern League) ===
Pos	Team	Pld	W	D	L	GF	GA	GD	Pts
1	KPT Kuopio (Q)	10	8	0	2	53	20	+33	16
2	Reipas Viipuri (Q)	10	6	3	1	23	17	+6	15
3	ViPS Viipuri	10	6	1	3	33	20	+13	13
4	KuPS Kuopio	10	4	2	4	32	25	+7	10
5	KoPS Kotka	10	1	2	7	11	37	−26	4
6	SP Sortavala (R)	10	0	2	8	21	54	−33	2

(Q) Qualified for the phase indicated; (R) Relegated

=== Länsisarja (Western League) ===
Pos	Team	Pld	W	D	L	GF	GA	GD	Pts
1	VIFK Vaasa (Q)	12	8	1	3	34	18	+16	17
2	UL Turku (Q)	12	6	3	3	27	8	+19	15
3	KIF Helsinki	12	5	3	4	21	16	+5	13
4	Akilles Porvoo	12	4	3	5	24	31	−7	11
5	TaPa Tampere	12	4	3	5	18	31	−13	11
6	ÅIFK Turku (R)	12	3	4	5	18	21	−3	10
7	TR Turku (R)	12	1	5	6	16	33	−17	7

(Q) Qualified for the phase indicated; (R) Relegated

=== Nousukarsinnat (Promotion Playoffs) ===
Pos	Team	Pld	W	D	L	GF	GA	GD	Pts
1	VIFK Vaasa (C, P)	3	3	0	0	12	1	+11	6
2	UL Turku (P)	3	1	1	1	5	9	−4	3
3	KPT Kuopio	3	1	0	2	6	9	−3	2
4	Reipas Viipuri	3	0	1	2	3	7	−4	1

(C) Champions; (P) Promoted

== See also ==
- Mestaruussarja (Tier 1)
