= 1976 Mestaruussarja =

Mestaruussarja
- Season: 1976

Statistics of Mestaruussarja in the 1976 season.

== Overview ==
It was contested by 12 teams, and KuPS Kuopio won the championship.

== League standings ==
Pos	Team	Pld	W	D	L	GF	GA	GD	Pts
1	KuPS Kuopio (C)	22	13	6	3	40	21	+19	32
2	Haka Valkeakoski	22	14	2	6	46	28	+18	30
3	HJK Helsinki	22	12	5	5	40	25	+15	29
4	Reipas Lahti	22	10	5	7	37	24	+13	25
5	MiPK Mikkeli	22	8	9	5	24	21	+3	25
6	MP Mikkeli	22	10	3	9	35	31	+4	23
7	VPS Vaasa	22	9	4	9	27	31	−4	22
8	KPV Kokkola	22	8	5	9	36	35	+1	21
9	OPS Oulu	22	5	7	10	18	34	−16	17
10	TPS Turku	22	7	1	14	30	38	−8	15
11	GBK Kokkola (R)	22	4	5	13	19	43	−24	13
12	KPT Kuopio (R)	22	3	6	13	12	33	−21	12

Source: rsssf.com
(C) Champions; (R) Relegated

== Results ==
Home \ Away	GBK	HAK	HJK	KPV	KPT	KPS	MPK	MP	OPS	REI	TPS	VPS
GBK		1–0	0–4	2–2	0–0	0–1	0–1	3–2	0–1	2–1	3–2	1–2
FC Haka	0–0		4–1	4–1	1–0	1–2	1–2	4–0	1–0	1–0	4–3	2–1
HJK Helsinki	4–3	4–0		0–1	3–0	3–3	1–0	3–1	3–3	1–3	1–0	2–1
KPV	3–0	2–4	0–1		2–0	2–2	0–1	3–3	3–0	2–0	1–2	5–2
KPT	2–1	1–5	1–3	1–1		0–3	2–1	0–1	0–0	0–1	2–0	0–2
KuPS	5–0	1–2	0–0	4–2	3–0		1–0	1–0	1–1	1–5	0–0	1–1
MiPK	1–1	0–0	1–1	1–1	1–0	1–3		0–0	5–1	1–1	2–0	2–0
MP	1–0	1–4	2–1	2–0	1–1	0–2	8–1		2–0	4–0	2–1	1–0
OPS	3–0	0–3	0–0	0–2	0–0	1–3	0–0	3–1		0–0	2–0	1–2
Reipas	6–1	1–3	0–2	2–0	1–1	0–1	0–0	1–0	4–1		3–2	3–0
TPS	1–0	3–0	1–2	2–3	1–0	2–1	0–3	1–2	4–0	0–4		5–1
VPS	1–1	4–2	1–0	2–0	2–1	0–1	0–0	2–1	0–1	1–1	2–0	

Legend: Blue = home team win; Yellow = draw; Red = away team win.

== Attendances ==
No.	Club	Average
1	HJK	2,886
2	KuPS	2,814
3	Haka	2,460
4	Reipas	2,298
5	MiKi	2,212
6	KPV	1,853
7	TPS	1,757
8	VPS	1,724
9	OPS	1,499
10	Koparit	1,352
11	GBK	1,293
12	MP	1,224
