= 1936 Mestaruussarja – Finnish League Championship =

Mestaruussarja
- Season: 1936
- Champions: HJK Helsinki
- Relegated: VPS Vaasa; Drott Pietarsaari
- Top goalscorer: Aatos Lehtonen, HJK Helsinki (14)

The 1936 season was the seventh completed season of Finnish Football League Championship, known as the Mestaruussarja.

== Overview ==
The 1936 Mestaruussarja was contested by 8 teams, with HJK Helsinki winning the championship. VPS Vaasa and Drott Pietarsaari were relegated to the second tier which was known as the Suomensarja.

== League table ==
Pos	Team	Pld	W	D	L	GF	GA	GD	Pts
1	HJK Helsinki (C)	14	9	1	4	37	21	+16	19
2	HPS Helsinki	14	8	1	5	28	26	+2	17
3	HIFK Helsinki	14	7	2	5	38	22	+16	16
4	Sudet Viipuri	14	6	3	5	26	21	+5	15
5	HT Helsinki	14	5	4	5	25	27	−2	14
6	TPS Turku	14	7	0	7	30	36	−6	14
7	VPS Vaasa (R)	14	5	2	7	36	31	+5	12
8	Drott Pietarsaari (R)	14	2	1	11	14	50	−36	5

(C) Champions; (R) Relegated

== Results ==
Home \ Away	DRO	HFK	HJK	HPS	HT	SUD	TPS	VPS
Drott		1–6	2–3	1–2	1–2	2–1	1–2	1–4
HIFK	5–1		2–1	4–3	2–3	2–3	5–2	2–1
HJK	8–0	1–0		3–1	2–3	3–2	3–2	3–0
HPS	2–1	2–0	3–0		1–1	1–0	1–4	4–2
HT	0–0	1–1	3–4	0–4		2–2	4–1	1–2
Sudet	0–1	1–0	0–0	4–1	3–1		3–1	2–1
TPS	6–1	0–7	1–5	0–1	2–1	3–2		2–1
VPS	9–1	2–2	2–1	6–2	2–3	3–3	1–4	

Legend: Blue = home team win; Yellow = draw; Red = away team win.

== See also ==
- 1936 Suomensarja (Tier 2)
