= Hangö IK =

Finnish sports club

- Full name: Hangö Idrottsklubb
- Nickname: Hikken or HIK
- Founded: 1903
- Ground: Rukki Arena, Hanko; Finland
- Chairman: Camilla Bäckman
- Manager: Tom Enberg
- League: Kolmonen
- 2011: 2nd – Kolmonen (Helsinki and Uusimaa) – Section 1
Home colours

Hangö Idrottsklubb (aka Hangö IK, or HIK for short) is a sports club from Hanko, Finland. The club was founded in 1903. It is best known for its football team which has played one season in the Finnish premier division Mestaruussarja, in 1962, and a number of seasons in the second tier Ykkönen. Their home ground is located at the Rukki Arena. The club also has activities in handball, athletics, table tennis and powerlifting.

== History ==
HIK was formed in 1903 which establishes them as one of the oldest clubs in the south-west of Finland. They have a long football history which reached its summit with one season in the highest division, the Mestaruussarja (Championship), back in 1962. They have also had 13 seasons in the Suomisarjaa (Finland League) which at that time was the second tier of Finnish football in 1939, 1948, 1955–61 and 1963–66. They also have played 6 seasons at the same level more recently in the Ykkönen from 1996 until 2001.

In 1996 HIK came within a whisker of reaching the Veikkausliiga (Finnish Premier League) by winning the Ykkönen South Group (Etelälohko) and then losing the promotion play-off 2–8 on aggregate with TP Seinäjoki. They then lost 1–2 on aggregate to HJK Helsinki in the promotion/relegation playoff. In 1999 and 2000 the club were again very close indeed in gaining promotion to the Veikkausliiga finishing top of the Ykkönen South Group (Etelälohko) but on each occasion failed to progress in the promotion play-offs. Sadly in 2002 the club withdrew from the Ykkönen and dropped to the Kolmonen where they have subsequently remained.

HIK have had three periods covering 17 seasons in the Kakkonen (Second Division), the third tier of Finnish football from 1973 to 1975, 1981–84 and 1986–95.

The highest ever attendance for a HIK match was in 1962 when 2,551 people attended the home game with MIFK.

== Season to season ==
Season to season of Hangö IK

Season	Level	Division	Section	Administration	Position	Movements
1931	Tier 3	Piirinsarja (District League)		Turku (SPL Turku)		Promotion Playoff
1932–36		District Leagues				
1937	Tier 3	Maakuntasarja (Third Division)	West	Finnish FA (Suomen Pallolitto)		Promotion Playoff West
1938	Tier 3	Maakuntasarja (Third Division)	West	Finnish FA (Suomen Pallolitto)		Promotion Playoff South
1939	Tier 2	Itä-Länsi-sarja (Second Division)	West League, Group 2	Finnish FA (Suomen Pallolitto)	6th	
1940–44						Did not participate
1945–46	Tier 3	Maakuntasarja (Third Division)	West Uusimaa Group	Finnish FA (Suomen Pallolitto)	2nd	
1946–47	Tier 3	Maakuntasarja (Third Division)	West Uusimaa Group	Finnish FA (Suomen Pallolitto)	1st	Promotion Playoff
1947–48	Tier 3	Maakuntasarja (Third Division)	West Uusimaa Group	Finnish FA (Suomen Pallolitto)	1st	Promotion Playoff – Promoted
1948	Tier 2	Suomensarja (Second Division)	South Group	Finnish FA (Suomen Pallolitto)	10th	Relegated
1949	Tier 3	Maakuntasarja (Third Division)	West Group B	Finnish FA (Suomen Pallolitto)	2nd	Promotion Playoff
1950	Tier 3	Maakuntasarja (Third Division)	South Group B	Finnish FA (Suomen Pallolitto)	1st	Promotion Group West 4th
1951	Tier 3	Maakuntasarja (Third Division)	West Group A	Finnish FA (Suomen Pallolitto)	3rd	
1952	Tier 3	Maakuntasarja (Third Division)	West Group A	Finnish FA (Suomen Pallolitto)	3rd	
1953	Tier 3	Maakuntasarja (Third Division)	West Group A	Finnish FA (Suomen Pallolitto)	3rd	
1954	Tier 3	Maakuntasarja (Third Division)	West Group III	Finnish FA (Suomen Pallolitto)	1st	Promotion Group West 1st – Promoted
1955	Tier 2	Suomensarja (Second Division)	West Group	Finnish FA (Suomen Pallolitto)	8th	
1956	Tier 2	Suomensarja (Second Division)	East Group	Finnish FA (Suomen Pallolitto)	8th	
1957	Tier 2	Suomensarja (Second Division)	East Group	Finnish FA (Suomen Pallolitto)	7th	
1958	Tier 2	Suomensarja (Second Division)	West Group	Finnish FA (Suomen Pallolitto)	3rd	
1959	Tier 2	Suomensarja (Second Division)	West Group	Finnish FA (Suomen Pallolitto)	7th	
1960	Tier 2	Suomensarja (Second Division)	South Group	Finnish FA (Suomen Pallolitto)	2nd	
1961	Tier 2	Suomensarja (Second Division)	West Group	Finnish FA (Suomen Pallolitto)	1st	Promoted
1962	Tier 1	Mestaruussarja (Premier League)		Finnish FA (Suomen Palloliitto)	12th	Relegated
1963	Tier 2	Suomensarja (Second Division)	West Group	Finnish FA (Suomen Pallolitto)	3rd	
1964	Tier 2	Suomensarja (Second Division)	West Group	Finnish FA (Suomen Pallolitto)	7th	
1965	Tier 2	Suomensarja (Second Division)	West Group	Finnish FA (Suomen Pallolitto)	6th	
1966	Tier 2	Suomensarja (Second Division)	West Group	Finnish FA (Suomen Pallolitto)	12th	Relegated
1967	Tier 3	Maakuntasarja (Third Division)	Group 2 Häme & Uusimaa	Finnish FA (Suomen Pallolitto)	5th	
1968	Tier 3	Maakuntasarja (Third Division)	Group 2 Häme & Uusimaa	Finnish FA (Suomen Pallolitto)	3rd	
1969	Tier 3	Maakuntasarja (Third Division)	Group 2 Häme & Uusimaa	Finnish FA (Suomen Pallolitto)	5th	
1970	Tier 3	III Divisioona (Third Division)	Group 2 Turku & Uusimaa	Finnish FA (Suomen Pallolitto)	4th	
1971	Tier 3	III Divisioona (Third Division)	Group 1 Helsinki & Uusimaa	Finnish FA (Suomen Pallolitto)	2nd	
1972	Tier 3	III Divisioona (Third Division)	Group 1 Helsinki & Uusimaa	Finnish FA (Suomen Pallolitto)	1st	Promoted
1973	Tier 3	II Divisioona (Second Division)	West Group	Finnish FA (Suomen Pallolitto)	6th	
1974	Tier 3	II Divisioona (Second Division)	West Group	Finnish FA (Suomen Pallolitto)	5th	
1975	Tier 3	II Divisioona (Second Division)	West Group	Finnish FA (Suomen Pallolitto)	12th	Relegated
1976	Tier 4	III Divisioona (Third Division)	Group 2 – Helsinki & Uusimaa	Finnish FA (Suomen Pallolitto)	2nd	
1977	Tier 4	III Divisioona (Third Division)	Group 2 – Helsinki & Uusimaa	Finnish FA (Suomen Pallolitto)	2nd	
1978	Tier 4	III Divisioona (Third Division)	Group 2 – Helsinki & Uusimaa	Finnish FA (Suomen Pallolitto)	3rd	
1979	Tier 4	III Divisioona (Third Division)	Group 2 – Helsinki & Uusimaa	Finnish FA (Suomen Pallolitto)	4th	
1980	Tier 4	III Divisioona (Third Division)	Group 2 – Helsinki & Uusimaa	Finnish FA (Suomen Pallolitto)	2nd	Promotion Playoff – Promoted
1981	Tier 3	II Divisioona (Second Division)	West Group	Finnish FA (Suomen Pallolitto)	4th	
1982	Tier 3	II Divisioona (Second Division)	West Group	Finnish FA (Suomen Pallolitto)	6th	
1983	Tier 3	II Divisioona (Second Division)	West Group	Finnish FA (Suomen Pallolitto)	7th	
1984	Tier 3	II Divisioona (Second Division)	West Group	Finnish FA (Suomen Pallolitto)	10th	Relegated
1985	Tier 4	III Divisioona (Third Division)	Group 2 – Helsinki & Uusimaa	Finnish FA (Suomen Pallolitto)	1st	Promoted
1986	Tier 3	II Divisioona (Second Division)	West Group	Finnish FA (Suomen Pallolitto)	3rd	
1987	Tier 3	II Divisioona (Second Division)	West Group	Finnish FA (Suomen Pallolitto)	7th	
1988	Tier 3	II Divisioona (Second Division)	West Group	Finnish FA (Suomen Pallolitto)	7th	
1989	Tier 3	II Divisioona (Second Division)	West Group	Finnish FA (Suomen Pallolitto)	8th	
1990	Tier 3	II Divisioona (Second Division)	West Group	Finnish FA (Suomen Pallolitto)	2nd	
1991	Tier 3	II Divisioona (Second Division)	West Group	Finnish FA (Suomen Pallolitto)	6th	
1992	Tier 3	II Divisioona (Second Division)	West Group	Finnish FA (Suomen Pallolitto)	4th	
1993	Tier 3	Kakkonen (Second Division)	West Group	Finnish FA (Suomen Pallolitto)	6th	
1994	Tier 3	Kakkonen (Second Division)	West Group	Finnish FA (Suomen Pallolitto)	3rd	
1995	Tier 3	Kakkonen (Second Division)	South Group	Finnish FA (Suomen Pallolitto)	1st	Promoted
1996	Tier 2	Ykkönen (First Division)	South Group	Finnish FA (Suomen Pallolitto)	1st	Promotion Playoffs
1997	Tier 2	Ykkönen (First Division)	South Group	Finnish FA (Suomen Pallolitto)	8th	Relegation Group – 7th
1998	Tier 2	Ykkönen (First Division)	South Group	Finnish FA (Suomen Pallolitto)	4th	Promotion Group – 8th
1999	Tier 2	Ykkönen (First Division)	South Group	Finnish FA (Suomen Pallolitto)	1st	Promotion Group – 4th
2000	Tier 2	Ykkönen (First Division)	South Group	Finnish FA (Suomen Pallolitto)	1st	Promotion Group – 3rd
2001	Tier 2	Ykkönen (First Division)	South Group	Finnish FA (Suomen Pallolitto)	5th	Withdrew for 2002 Season
2002	Tier 4	Kolmonen (Third Division)	Section 1	Helsinki & Uusimaa (SPL Uusimaa)	2nd	
2003	Tier 4	Kolmonen (Third Division)	Section 1	Helsinki & Uusimaa (SPL Uusimaa)	2nd	
2004	Tier 4	Kolmonen (Third Division)	Section 1	Helsinki & Uusimaa (SPL Uusimaa)	5th	
2005	Tier 4	Kolmonen (Third Division)	Section 1	Helsinki & Uusimaa (SPL Uusimaa)	2nd	
2006	Tier 4	Kolmonen (Third Division)	Section 1	Helsinki & Uusimaa (SPL Uusimaa)	3rd	
2007	Tier 4	Kolmonen (Third Division)	Section 1	Helsinki & Uusimaa (SPL Uusimaa)	2nd	
2008	Tier 4	Kolmonen (Third Division)	Section 1	Helsinki & Uusimaa (SPL Uusimaa)	4th	
2009	Tier 4	Kolmonen (Third Division)	Section 1	Helsinki & Uusimaa (SPL Uusimaa)	3rd	
2010	Tier 4	Kolmonen (Third Division)	Section 1	Helsinki & Uusimaa (SPL Uusimaa)	4th	
2011	Tier 4	Kolmonen (Third Division)	Section 1	Helsinki & Uusimaa (SPL Uusimaa)	2nd	
2012	Tier 4	Kolmonen (Third Division)	Section 1	Helsinki & Uusimaa (SPL Uusimaa)	3rd	
2013	Tier 4	Kolmonen (Third Division)	Section 1	Helsinki & Uusimaa (SPL Uusimaa)	2nd	
2014	Tier 4	Kolmonen (Third Division)	Section 1	Helsinki & Uusimaa (SPL Uusimaa)	2nd	
2015	Tier 4	Kolmonen (Third Division)	Section 1	Helsinki & Uusimaa (SPL Uusimaa)	4th	
2016	Tier 4	Kolmonen (Third Division)	Section 1	Helsinki & Uusimaa (SPL Uusimaa)	12th	Relegated
2017	Tier 5	Nelonen (Fourth Division)	Group 1	Uusimaa (SPL Uusimaa)	3rd	
2018	Tier 5	Nelonen (Fourth Division)	Group 1	Uusimaa (SPL Uusimaa)	1st	Promoted
2019	Tier 4	Kolmonen (Third Division)	Group 1	Helsinki & Uusimaa (SPL Helsinki)	12th	Relegated
2020	Tier 5	Nelonen (Fourth Division)	Group 1	Southern (SPL Eteläinen)	10th	
2021	Tier 5	Nelonen (Fourth Division)	Group 1	Southern (SPL Eteläinen)	4th	
2022	Tier 5	Nelonen (Fourth Division)	Group 1	Southern (SPL Eteläinen)	7th	
2023	Tier 5	Nelonen (Fourth Division)	Group 1	Southern (SPL Eteläinen)	7th	
2024	Tier 6	Nelonen (Fourth Division)	Group 1	Southern (SPL Eteläinen)	10th	Relegated
2025	Tier 7	Vitonen (Fifth Division)	Group 1	Southern (SPL Eteläinen)		

- 1 season in Mestaruussarja
- 19 seasons in Ykkönen
- 35 seasons in Kakkonen
- 22 seasons in Kolmonen
- 6 seasons in Nelonen
- 1 season in 6th Tier
- 1 season in 7th Tier

== Junior section ==
HIK has a junior section with a large number of teams. The main event run by the club is the Itämeri Cup tournament which in 2010 was held from Friday 30 July until Sunday 1 August. Another event run by the club in the winter months is the Hanko Cup.

== Club structure ==
HIK currently has 2 men's teams, 10 boys' teams and 2 girls' teams.

== Current squad ==
Note: Flags indicate national team as defined under FIFA eligibility rules; some limited exceptions apply. Players may hold more than one non-FIFA nationality.

No.	Pos.	Nation	Player
1	GK	FIN	Tatu Hämäläinen
2	DF	FIN	Hannu Karvinen
4	MF	FIN	Patrik Lahti
5	MF	FIN	Eemeli Repo
6	MF	FIN	Markus Dahlbom
7	MF	FIN	Alexander Österlund
8	DF	FIN	Santeri Määttä
9	DF	FIN	Walter Gustafsson
10	MF	FIN	Miki Olin
11	DF	BRA	Allan Souza
12	GK	FIN	Kasper Lind
13	DF	FIN	Henri Satomaa
14	MF	FIN	Joni Kinnunen
15	MF	FIN	Ivar Stenman

No.	Pos.	Nation	Player
16	FW	NGA	Vincent Emeka
17	MF	IRN	Ibrahim Nazari
18	FW	FIN	Cristoffer Eklund
19	MF	FIN	Ted Rosenström
20	FW	FIN	Tom Enberg
21	DF	FIN	Marko Lahti
22	FW	BRA	Marcello Ribeiro
23	MF	FIN	Johnny Sandberg
24	MF	FIN	Kristian Fast
30	GK	CPV	Anilton Cruz
—	MF	IRQ	Saeid Bahrami
—	MF	FIN	Jonas Kinnunen
—	MF	FIN	Henrik Himmelroos
—	DF	PER	Marco Marcelo

== References and sources ==
- Official website
- Official football club website
- Finnish Wikipedia
- Suomen Cup
