= 1946 Mestaruussarja =

Mestaruussarja
- Season: 1946

The 1946 season was the 16th completed season of Finnish Football League Championship, which culminated in a final between the winners of the Palloliiton league and the Työväen Urheiluliiton league.

== Final ==
- TPV Tampere 2–5 VIFK Vaasa
- VIFK Vaasa 0–1 TPV Tampere
- Replay: VIFK Vaasa 5–1 TPV Tampere
