= 1964 Mestaruussarja =

Mestaruussarja
- Season: 1964
- Champions: HJK Helsinki
- Relegated: HPS Helsinki; MiPK Mikkeli; KIF Helsinki
- European Cup: HJK Helsinki
- Matches: 132
- Goals: 423 (3.2 per match)
- Average goals/game: 3,20

Statistics of Mestaruussarja in the 1964 season.

== Overview ==
It was contested by 12 teams, and HJK Helsinki won the championship.

== League standings ==
Pos	Team	Pld	W	D	L	GF	GA	GD	Pts
1	HJK Helsinki (C)	22	14	6	2	42	18	+24	34
2	KuPS Kuopio	22	13	4	5	39	21	+18	30
3	KTP Kotka	22	12	4	6	47	29	+18	28
4	Haka Valkeakoski	22	11	5	6	42	22	+20	27
5	Reipas Lahti	22	10	4	8	46	33	+13	24
6	HIFK Helsinki	22	7	9	6	27	29	−2	23
7	IKissat Tampere	22	8	6	8	32	37	−5	22
8	ÅIFK Turku	22	8	5	9	33	33	0	21
9	GBK Kokkola	22	7	4	11	27	42	−15	18
10	HPS Helsinki (R)	22	5	3	14	31	45	−14	13
11	MiPK Mikkeli (R)	22	4	4	14	38	64	−26	12
12	KIF Helsinki (R)	22	3	6	13	19	50	−31	12

Source: rsssf.com
(C) Champions; (R) Relegated

== Results ==
Home \ Away	GBK	HAK	HFK	HJK	HPS	ILV	KIF	KTP	KPS	MPK	REI	ÅIF
GBK		2–0	0–1	2–4	2–0	3–3	1–1	0–3	2–5	0–1	2–1	1–0
FC Haka	2–0		1–1	0–0	1–2	1–1	2–1	0–2	2–0	2–0	2–0	5–0
HIFK	1–1	1–3		3–2	0–0	4–1	2–2	2–1	0–1	3–1	0–1	0–0
HJK Helsinki	7–2	1–1	0–0		2–0	1–1	5–1	1–4	2–1	1–0	3–0	3–0
HPS	1–2	2–3	1–4	0–1		1–0	1–0	1–3	1–2	4–4	5–2	2–2
I-Kissat	1–0	1–2	1–1	1–2	2–0		1–0	2–3	1–1	5–4	2–1	3–2
KIF	1–1	0–9	0–0	0–1	0–7	5–0		2–0	0–0	2–1	2–3	0–1
KTP	1–2	0–0	5–2	0–0	4–0	2–2	4–0		2–0	6–2	1–0	2–0
KuPS	1–0	1–0	4–0	0–1	4–0	0–2	2–1	3–1		1–0	2–1	1–1
MiPK	4–0	0–4	1–2	1–3	3–2	0–1	1–1	6–2	1–6		1–1	4–4
Reipas	3–2	4–0	3–0	1–1	3–1	2–1	3–0	1–1	2–2	9–3		5–1
ÅIFK	1–2	3–2	0–0	0–1	1–0	2–0	5–0	3–0	1–2	5–0	1–0	

Legend: Blue = home team win; Yellow = draw; Red = away team win.

== Attendances ==
No.	Club	Average
1	HJK	3,952
2	ÅIFK	3,071
3	KTP	2,894
4	KuPS	2,509
5	Reipas	2,466
6	HIFK	2,404
7	Haka	2,283
8	GBK	2,077
9	HP	1,970
10	KIF	1,810
11	Ilves	1,513
12	MiPK	1,009
