= Into Kemi =

Finnish sports club

Kemin Into, is a Finnish sports club based in the town of Kemi. Founded in 1907, they have sections in gymnastics, wrestling, boxing, bowling and basketball. Club owns a campsite in 8 km south of Kemi. Kemin Into is a member club of Finnish Workers' Sports Federation

== Football ==
In 1970 Kemin Into was a first club from Lapland to reach Finnish first tier, known as mestaruussarja at the time. They were relegated after a single season. In 1985 they merged with two other local TUL Clubs to form Kemin Pallotoverit(KPT-85). They played their last season in 1985.

== Season to season ==
Season	Level	Division	Section	Administration	Position	Movements
1954	Tier 3	Maakuntasarja (Third Division)	North Group I	Finnish FA (Suomen Pallolitto)	3rd	
1955						
1956	Tier 3	Maakuntasarja (Third Division)	North Group I	Finnish FA (Suomen Pallolitto)	7th	Relegated
1957	Tier 4	Aluesarja (Fourth Division)	Group 18	Finnish FA (Suomen Palloliitto)	2nd	
1958	Tier 4	Aluesarja (Fourth Division)	Group 17	Finnish FA (Suomen Palloliitto)	1st	Promoted
1959	Tier 3	Maakuntasarja (Third Division)	Group 9	Finnish FA (Suomen Pallolitto)	3rd	
1960	Tier 3	Maakuntasarja (Third Division)	Group 9	Finnish FA (Suomen Pallolitto)	4th	
1961	Tier 3	Maakuntasarja (Third Division)	Group 9	Finnish FA (Suomen Pallolitto)	4th	
1962	Tier 3	Maakuntasarja (Third Division)	Group 9	Finnish FA (Suomen Pallolitto)	6th	
1963	Tier 3	Maakuntasarja (Third Division)	Group 9	Finnish FA (Suomen Pallolitto)	6th	
1964	Tier 3	Maakuntasarja (Third Division)	Group 9	Finnish FA (Suomen Pallolitto)	3rd	
1965	Tier 3	Maakuntasarja (Third Division)	Group 9	Finnish FA (Suomen Pallolitto)	1st	Promoted
1966	Tier 2	Suomensarja (Second Division)	North Group	Finnish FA (Suomen Palloliitto)	7th	
1967	Tier 2	Suomensarja (Second Division)	North Group	Finnish FA (Suomen Palloliitto)	5th	
1968	Tier 2	Suomensarja (Second Division)	North Group	Finnish FA (Suomen Palloliitto)	3rd	
1969	Tier 2	Suomensarja (Second Division)	North Group	Finnish FA (Suomen Palloliitto)	1st	Promotion Group 1st – Promoted
1970	Tier 1	Mestaruussarja (Premier Division)		Finnish FA (Suomen Palloliitto)	11th	Relegated
1971	Tier 2	II Divisioona (Second Division)	North Group	Finnish FA (Suomen Palloliitto)	6th	
1972	Tier 2	II Divisioona (Second Division)	North Group	Finnish FA (Suomen Palloliitto)	5th	
1973	Tier 3	II Divisioona (Second Division)	North Group	Finnish FA (Suomen Pallolitto)	1st	lost rematch for promotion
1974	Tier 3	II Divisioona (Second Division)	North Group	Finnish FA (Suomen Pallolitto)	2nd	
1975	Tier 3	II Divisioona (Second Division)	North Group	Finnish FA (Suomen Pallolitto)	3rd	
1976	Tier 3	II Divisioona (Second Division)	North Group	Finnish FA (Suomen Pallolitto)	1st	Promoted
1977	Tier 2	I Divisioona (First Division)		Finnish FA (Suomen Palloliitto)	11th	Relegated
1978	Tier 3	II Divisioona (Second Division)	North Group	Finnish FA (Suomen Pallolitto)	12th	Relegated
1979	Tier 4	III Divisioona (Third Division)	Group 9	Finnish FA (Suomen Palloliitto)	3rd	
1980	Tier 4	III Divisioona (Third Division)	Group 9	Finnish FA (Suomen Palloliitto)	4th	
1981	Tier 4	III Divisioona (Third Division)	Group 9	Finnish FA (Suomen Palloliitto)	4th	
1982	Tier 4	III Divisioona (Third Division)	Group 9	Finnish FA (Suomen Palloliitto)	5th	
1983	Tier 4	III Divisioona (Third Division)	Group 9	Finnish FA (Suomen Palloliitto)	3rd	
1984	Tier 4	III Divisioona (Third Division)	Group 9	Finnish FA (Suomen Palloliitto)	8th	
1985	Tier 4	III Divisioona (Third Division)	Group 9	Finnish FA (Suomen Palloliitto)	10th	Relegated

- 1 seasons in Mestaruussarja
- 7 seasons in Ykkönen
- 13 seasons in Kakkonen
- 9 season in Kolmonen
