= 1985 Ykkönen – Finnish League Division 1 =

Finnish League Division 1
- Season: 1985
- Champions: MP Mikkeli
- Promoted: MP Mikkeli
- Relegated: Karpalo Joensuu; P-Iirot Rauma; GrIFK Kauniainen

League table for teams participating in Ykkönen, the second tier of the Finnish Soccer League system, in 1985.

== League table ==
Pos	Team	Pld	W	D	L	GF	GA	GD	Pts
1	MP Mikkeli	22	16	4	2	47	15	+32	36
2	Reipas Lahti	22	14	2	6	43	16	+27	30
3	LauTP Lappeenranta	22	14	2	6	52	34	+18	30
4	Jaro Pietarsaari	22	10	5	7	43	33	+10	25
5	MyPa Anjalankoski	22	10	5	7	45	48	−3	25
6	Huima Äänekoski	22	8	6	8	36	45	−9	22
7	FinnPa Helsinki	22	8	5	9	52	43	+9	21
8	KajHa Kajaani	22	8	4	10	37	42	−5	20
9	Elo Kuopio	22	7	4	11	29	47	−18	18
10	Karpalo Joensuu	22	6	4	12	44	54	−10	16
11	P-Iirot Rauma	22	4	3	15	21	47	−26	11
12	GrIFK Kauniainen	22	4	2	16	28	53	−25	10

Replay for 2nd place: Reipas Lahti - LauTP Lappeenranta 5-0

== Promotion/relegation playoff ==
- Reipas Lahti - Koparit Kuopio 0-1
- Koparit Kuopio - Reipas Lahti 2-2

Koparit Kuopio (formerly KPT Kuopio) stayed in Premier Division

== See also ==
- Mestaruussarja (Tier 1)
