= Urho Teräs =

Finnish footballer (1915-1990)

Urho Teräs (7 July 1915 – 8 August 1990), born and died in Turku, was a Finnish footballer.

He earned 11 international caps between 1938 and 1949, scoring one goal.

At club level, Teräs played for TuUL and TPS.

== Honours ==
- Finnish Championship: 1939, 1941, 1945, 1949
