= 1970 Mestaruussarja =

Mestaruussarja
- Season: 1970
- Champions: Reipas Lahti
- Relegated: Into Kemi, Elo Kuopio

Statistics of Mestaruussarja in the 1970 season.

== Overview ==
It was contested by 12 teams, and Reipas Lahti won the championship.

== League standings ==
| Pos | Team | Pld | W | D | L | GF | GA | GD | Pts |
|---|---|---|---|---|---|---|---|---|---|
| 1 | Reipas Lahti (C) | 22 | 14 | 4 | 4 | 45 | 28 | +17 | 32 |
| 2 | MP Mikkeli | 22 | 12 | 5 | 5 | 60 | 31 | +29 | 29 |
| 3 | HIFK Helsinki | 22 | 10 | 8 | 4 | 60 | 34 | +26 | 28 |
| 4 | KuPS Kuopio | 22 | 10 | 7 | 5 | 35 | 25 | +10 | 27 |
| 5 | HJK Helsinki | 22 | 9 | 7 | 6 | 37 | 26 | +11 | 25 |
| 6 | KPV Kokkola | 22 | 8 | 7 | 7 | 40 | 31 | +9 | 23 |
| 7 | TPS Turku | 22 | 9 | 5 | 8 | 35 | 34 | +1 | 23 |
| 8 | Haka Valkeakoski | 22 | 7 | 6 | 9 | 31 | 34 | −3 | 20 |
| 9 | Kuusysi Lahti | 22 | 9 | 1 | 12 | 31 | 38 | −7 | 19 |
| 10 | Ilves-Kissat Tampere | 22 | 8 | 2 | 12 | 28 | 42 | −14 | 18 |
| 11 | Into Kemi (R) | 22 | 7 | 2 | 13 | 29 | 53 | −24 | 16 |
| 12 | Elo Kuopio (R) | 22 | 0 | 4 | 18 | 15 | 70 | −55 | 4 |

Source: rsssf.com
(C) Champions; (R) Relegated

== Results ==
| Home \ Away | ELO | HAK | HFK | HJK | ILV | INT | KPV | KPS | L69 | MP | REI | TPS |
|---|---|---|---|---|---|---|---|---|---|---|---|---|
| Elo | | 0–2 | 2–2 | 0–2 | 0–1 | 0–1 | 0–2 | 0–1 | 0–6 | 1–7 | 0–4 | 3–3 |
| FC Haka | 2–2 | | 1–1 | 0–2 | 5–3 | 1–0 | 1–1 | 0–2 | 1–3 | 3–5 | 0–1 | 1–1 |
| HIFK | 8–0 | 1–1 | | 1–3 | 2–2 | 10–2 | 1–1 | 5–1 | 1–0 | 1–6 | 0–0 | 4–2 |
| HJK Helsinki | 5–0 | 0–1 | 1–5 | | 1–2 | 4–1 | 0–0 | 1–1 | 3–1 | 2–0 | 3–2 | 2–2 |
| I-Kissat | 3–1 | 1–0 | 0–3 | 2–2 | | 3–1 | 0–5 | 3–0 | 2–1 | 1–3 | 0–2 | 1–2 |
| Into | 4–2 | 0–4 | 1–1 | 1–0 | 1–0 | | 2–1 | 1–3 | 3–1 | 1–1 | 1–2 | 2–0 |
| KPV | 4–2 | 0–3 | 2–1 | 0–1 | 2–0 | 3–1 | | 1–1 | 4–0 | 0–2 | 3–4 | 1–1 |
| KuPS | 3–0 | 0–0 | 5–0 | 4–3 | 2–0 | 3–2 | 1–1 | | 2–1 | 1–1 | 2–0 | 0–1 |
| Lahti-69 | 3–0 | 1–3 | 0–4 | 1–0 | 2–0 | 3–0 | 1–1 | 1–0 | | 1–5 | 0–1 | 3–1 |
| MP | 1–1 | 5–1 | 1–3 | 2–2 | 0–3 | 4–1 | 2–5 | 0–0 | 4–0 | | 5–0 | 1–0 |
| Reipas | 4–1 | 2–1 | 2–2 | 0–0 | 6–1 | 2–1 | 4–2 | 1–1 | 1–2 | 3–2 | | 2–0 |
| TPS | 2–0 | 3–0 | 1–4 | 0–0 | 1–0 | 5–2 | 3–1 | 3–2 | 2–0 | 1–3 | 1–2 | |

Legend: Blue = home team win; Yellow = draw; Red = away team win.
