= 1963 Mestaruussarja =

Mestaruussarja
- Season: 1963

Statistics of Mestaruussarja in the 1963 season.

== Overview ==
It was contested by 12 teams, and Reipas Lahti won the championship.

== League standings ==
Pos	Team	Pld	W	D	L	GF	GA	GD	Pts
1	Reipas Lahti (C)	22	13	6	3	44	18	+26	32
2	Haka Valkeakoski	22	15	1	6	56	20	+36	31
3	ÅIFK Turku	22	11	3	8	44	32	+12	25
4	HIFK Helsinki	22	9	6	7	42	30	+12	24
5	KTP Kotka	22	10	3	9	44	42	+2	23
6	KuPS Kuopio	22	8	6	8	29	31	−2	22
7	MiPK Mikkeli	22	7	6	9	33	37	−4	20
8	HPS Helsinki	22	8	4	10	36	41	−5	20
9	KIF Helsinki	22	8	4	10	26	40	−14	20
10	TPS Turku (R)	22	7	5	10	23	35	−12	19
11	TaPa Tampere (R)	22	6	5	11	27	43	−16	17
12	VIFK Vaasa (R)	22	4	3	15	27	62	−35	11

Source: rsssf.com
(C) Champions; (R) Relegated

== Results ==
Home \ Away	HAK	HFK	HPS	KIF	KTP	KPS	MPK	REI	TPT	TPS	VIF	ÅIF
FC Haka		0–1	1–4	1–0	0–1	5–0	4–0	0–2	2–0	4–0	6–0	1–2
HIFK	1–4		0–3	4–1	1–2	0–0	1–1	1–1	0–0	0–2	8–1	3–2
HPS	0–5	2–4		3–1	0–2	3–1	2–1	1–2	3–3	1–0	0–1	1–1
KIF	2–2	0–5	1–0		1–1	2–0	2–5	1–0	1–1	2–0	0–1	4–5
KTP	2–3	0–4	3–2	1–0		2–5	2–2	1–1	5–1	4–0	6–5	4–3
KuPS	0–3	1–1	3–0	0–1	1–0		3–2	1–1	2–1	4–1	3–0	0–0
MiPK	0–5	2–3	0–0	1–2	1–0	0–1		0–4	3–0	3–0	0–0	3–1
Reipas	1–3	1–1	4–1	0–0	3–1	1–1	2–1		4–0	2–0	4–0	4–1
TaPa	0–1	2–1	4–3	0–2	3–0	3–1	2–2	0–1		0–0	2–0	0–4
TPS	1–3	3–0	2–2	3–0	4–0	1–0	1–1	1–4	1–0		1–0	1–1
VIFK	1–3	0–2	2–4	2–3	0–7	1–1	1–2	3–0	2–5	1–1		2–1
ÅIFK	2–0	2–1	0–1	2–0	2–0	3–1	1–3	0–2	5–0	3–0	3–1	

Legend: Blue = home team win; Yellow = draw; Red = away team win.

== Attendances ==
No.	Club	Average
1	ÅIFK	4,007
2	TPS	3,521
3	HIFK	3,175
4	KTP	2,968
5	HP	2,891
6	MiPK	2,720
7	Reipas	2,547
8	KIF	2,468
9	Haka	2,457
10	KuPS	2,033
11	TaPa	1,681
12	VIFK	1,476
