= 1978–79 Belgian Cup =

Tournament details
- Country: Belgium

Final positions
- Champions: K. Beerschot V.A.C.
- Runner-up: Club Brugge K.V.

The 1978–79 Belgian Cup was the 24th season of the main knockout competition in Belgian association football, the Belgian Cup.

== Final rounds ==
The final game was played at the Heysel Stadium between K. Beerschot V.A.C. and Club Brugge K.V., K. Beerschot V.A.C. winning 1–0.

=== Final ===
10 June 1979
16:00

| Beerschot V.A.V. | 1–0 | Club Brugge |
|---|---|---|
| Coninx 54' | Report |

Heysel Stadium, Brussels
Attendance: 42,000
Referee: Francis Rion
