= 1966 Mestaruussarja =

Mestaruussarja
- Season: 1966
- Champions: KuPS Kuopio
- Relegated: HIFK Helsinki, GBK Kokkola, OTP Oulu

Statistics of Mestaruussarja in the 1966 season.

== Overview ==
It was contested by 12 teams, and KuPS Kuopio won the championship.

== League standings ==
Pos	Team	Pld	W	D	L	GF	GA	GD	Pts
1	KuPS Kuopio (C)	22	12	5	5	41	23	+18	29
2	HJK Helsinki	22	10	7	5	46	30	+16	27
3	Haka Valkeakoski	22	10	4	8	40	29	+11	24
4	MP Mikkeli	22	9	6	7	36	33	+3	24
5	Reipas Lahti	22	8	6	8	34	37	−3	22
6	KTP Kotka	22	11	0	11	46	52	−6	22
7	TPS Turku	22	6	9	7	38	40	−2	21
8	Ilves-Kissat Tampere	22	8	5	9	27	29	−2	21
9	VPS Vaasa	22	9	2	11	28	40	−12	20
10	HIFK Helsinki (R)	22	6	7	9	30	33	−3	19
11	GBK Kokkola (R)	22	8	2	12	26	36	−10	18
12	OTP Oulu (R)	22	7	3	12	31	41	−10	17

Source: rsssf.com
(C) Champions; (R) Relegated

== Results ==
Home \ Away	GBK	HAK	HFK	HJK	ILV	KTP	KPS	MP	OTP	REI	TPS	VPS
GBK		2–0	1–1	2–0	0–1	1–4	1–0	3–0	2–0	2–0	2–3	0–2
FC Haka	1–1		0–1	1–1	6–1	6–2	0–1	2–1	2–4	0–2	3–0	5–0
HIFK	2–0	0–2		2–3	2–0	6–1	0–4	1–1	6–1	1–1	2–2	1–0
HJK Helsinki	2–0	4–2	1–1		1–0	4–0	3–3	4–1	2–0	1–1	4–1	4–0
I-Kissat	4–0	1–2	2–0	1–1		2–3	0–0	4–1	0–0	0–1	1–1	3–0
KTP	4–0	2–0	2–1	3–2	1–2		1–2	1–2	2–1	2–1	7–2	3–1
KuPS	1–0	0–2	0–0	2–3	1–1	6–1		0–4	3–1	2–0	3–0	1–0
MP	3–1	1–1	3–0	2–1	2–1	1–4	0–0		3–0	3–3	1–3	2–0
OTP	1–2	1–2	2–1	3–2	4–0	3–2	1–3	1–0		2–2	1–1	4–1
Reipas	1–2	0–1	5–1	2–2	2–0	1–0	1–5	1–3	1–0		2–1	2–5
TPS	3–2	1–1	0–0	1–1	0–1	7–1	1–2	1–1	2–0	4–4		4–1
VPS	3–2	3–1	2–1	2–0	1–2	1–0	3–2	1–1	2–1	0–1	0–0	

Legend: Blue = home team win; Yellow = draw; Red = away team win.
