= 1985 Mestaruussarja =

Mestaruussarja
- Season: 1985

Statistics of Mestaruussarja in the 1985 season.

== Overview ==
It was contested by 12 teams, and HJK Helsinki won the championship.

== Preliminary stage ==
=== Table ===
Pos	Team	Pld	W	D	L	GF	GA	GD	Pts
1	TPS Turku (Q)	22	13	3	6	45	22	+23	29
2	HJK Helsinki (C, Q)	22	11	6	5	41	23	+18	28
3	KePS Kemi (Q)	22	11	6	5	31	18	+13	28
4	Ilves Tampere (Q)	22	11	5	6	39	23	+16	27
5	Kuusysi Lahti	22	13	1	8	47	35	+12	27
6	KuPS Kuopio	22	10	5	7	42	27	+15	25
7	RoPS Rovaniemi	22	9	4	9	30	30	0	22
8	Haka Valkeakoski	22	8	3	11	32	36	−4	19
9	PPT Pori	22	7	5	10	27	41	−14	19
10	OTP Oulu (O)	22	7	0	15	23	49	−26	14
11	Koparit Kuopio (O)	22	5	4	13	19	38	−19	14
12	KPV Kokkola (R)	22	5	2	15	18	52	−34	12

Source: rsssf.com
(C) Champions; (O) Play-off winners; (Q) Qualified for the phase indicated; (R) Relegated

=== Results ===
Home \ Away	HAK	HJK	ILV	KEM	KPT	KPV	KPS	KUU	OTP	PPT	RPS	TPS
FC Haka		0–0	0–1	0–1	2–0	5–0	1–4	5–1	4–0	1–1	1–2	2–1
HJK Helsinki	2–0		1–1	0–3	3–0	1–0	3–2	2–1	2–1	6–0	2–2	1–2
Ilves	1–4	1–3		0–0	1–1	4–1	1–0	4–0	3–0	5–2	3–0	2–1
KePS	4–0	1–1	1–0		1–1	1–1	1–0	0–2	2–0	1–1	3–1	2–1
Koparit	1–0	1–1	1–0	2–1		2–0	0–2	0–3	0–1	2–3	1–3	1–3
KPV	0–2	2–0	2–1	1–2	1–0		0–2	0–5	1–4	0–0	0–1	0–2
KuPS	0–0	1–6	2–2	1–0	2–2	4–1		0–0	4–1	3–0	4–0	2–0
Kuusysi	3–1	0–3	0–3	1–3	2–0	8–0	1–5		3–0	1–0	6–2	0–2
OTP	1–4	0–1	1–4	1–0	1–2	1–3	3–1	1–3		1–0	2–0	0–1
PPT	4–0	2–1	0–2	0–2	3–2	0–4	2–1	1–2	4–3		2–0	0–2
RoPS	7–0	0–0	0–0	3–1	2–0	2–0	1–0	1–2	0–1	1–1		2–0
TPS	2–0	3–2	3–0	1–1	3–0	5–1	2–2	2–3	7–0	1–1	1–0	

Legend: Blue = home team win; Yellow = draw; Red = away team win.

== Championship Playoffs ==
=== Semifinals ===
Team 1	Agg.	Team 2	1st leg	2nd leg
Ilves Tampere	4–2	TPS Turku	3–1	1–1
KePS Kemi	3–3 (a)	HJK Helsinki	3–2	0–1

=== For Third Place ===
Team 1	Agg.	Team 2	1st leg	2nd leg
TPS Turku	1–1	KePS Kemi	1–0	0–1 (4–5 p)

=== Finals ===
Team 1	Agg.	Team 2	1st leg	2nd leg
Ilves Tampere	2–4	HJK Helsinki	1–0	1–4

== Attendances ==
No.	Club	Average
1	HJK	6,789
2	Ilves	4,184
3	TPS	2,398
4	RoPS	2,306
5	KPS	2,247
6	KuPS	2,234
7	Kuusysi	2,194
8	Haka	1,936
9	Jazz	1,611
10	KPV	1,474
11	Koparit	1,382
12	Oulu	932

== See also ==
- Ykkönen (Tier 2)
