= Kajaanin Palloilijat =

Finnish football club

- Nickname(s): KaPa
- Founded: 1924
- Chairman: Lauri Huovinen
Home colours	Away colours

Kajaanin Palloilijat (abbreviated KaPa) is a football club from Kajaani in Finland. The club was formed in 1924. KaPa has played one season in the Finnish premier division Mestaruussarja in 1953. In 2006 the club's men's team merged with Tarmo and formed AC Kajaani, original KaPa has since focused on youth football.

== History ==
In 1924 footballers from to local sports clubs, Kipinä and Ärjy, decided to form a new football club. Founding meeting was held on 3.7.1924 at a local cafeteria. Only 9 days later club played their first match against football club from Kuopio, match ended in a 1–1 draw. Club participated in Savo district leagues during the 1930s but was not allowed to participate in national competition due to the town's remote location, almost all other clubs at the time came from southern and western coast. In 1939 they were allowed to qualify to national leagues. In 1952 Club won a promotion to premier division, but was relegated after a single season. In the 1956 first division season KaPa came second just one point behind KoRe, missing promotion back to Mestaruussarja. Palloilijat spent most of its history in the second and third levels of Finnish football. In the 1970s another local club, Kajaanin Haka rose to prominence, which eventually led KaPa losing its long-held position as leading football club of Kajaani, and relegating in to lower tiers in the 1990s. In 2006 the adults team merged with Tarmo to form AC Kajaani.

== Season to season ==
Season to Season

Season	Level	Division	Section	Administration	Position	Movements
1931	Tier 3	Piirinsarja (District League)		Savo District (SPL Savo)	5th	
1932	Tier 3	Piirinsarja (District League)		Savo District (SPL Savo)	6th	
1933	Tier 3	Piirinsarja (District League)		Savo District (SPL Savo)	4th	
1934	Tier 3	Piirinsarja (District League)		Savo District (SPL Savo)	6th	
1935	Tier 3	Piirinsarja (District League)		Savo District (SPL Savo)	3rd	
1936-38	Tier 3	Piirinsarja (District League)		Savo District (SPL Savo)	No tables available	
1939	Tier 2	Itä-Länsi-sarja (Second Division)	East League, North Group	Finnish FA (Suomen Palloliitto)	3rd	
1940-41	Tier 3	C-sarja (Third Division)	Group 6	Finnish FA (Suomen Palloliitto)	1st	Promotion Playoff
1942-44						Did not participate
1945-46	Tier 3	Maakuntasarja (Third Division)	North Group	Finnish FA (Suomen Palloliitto)	2nd	
1946-47	Tier 3	Maakuntasarja (Third Division)	Savonia Group	Finnish FA (Suomen Palloliitto)	1st	Promotion Playoff - Promoted
1947-48	Tier 2	Suomensarja (Second Division)	North Group	Finnish FA (Suomen Palloliitto)	3rd	
1948	Tier 2	Suomensarja (Second Division)	North Group	Finnish FA (Suomen Palloliitto)	2nd	
1949	Tier 2	Suomensarja (Second Division)	East Group	Finnish FA (Suomen Palloliitto)	3rd	
1950	Tier 2	Suomensarja (Second Division)	East Group	Finnish FA (Suomen Palloliitto)	3rd	
1951	Tier 2	Suomensarja (Second Division)	East Group	Finnish FA (Suomen Palloliitto)	3rd	
1952	Tier 2	Suomensarja (Second Division)	East Group	Finnish FA (Suomen Palloliitto)	1st	Promoted
1953	Tier 1	Mestaruussarja (Premier League)		Finnish FA (Suomen Palloliitto)	10th	Relegated
1954	Tier 2	Suomensarja (Second Division)	East Group	Finnish FA (Suomen Palloliitto)	8th	
1955	Tier 2	Suomensarja (Second Division)	East Group	Finnish FA (Suomen Palloliitto)	7th	
1956	Tier 2	Suomensarja (Second Division)	East Group	Finnish FA (Suomen Palloliitto)	2nd	
1957	Tier 2	Suomensarja (Second Division)	East Group	Finnish FA (Suomen Palloliitto)	5th	
1958	Tier 2	Suomensarja (Second Division)	North Group	Finnish FA (Suomen Palloliitto)	4th	
1959	Tier 2	Suomensarja (Second Division)	North Group	Finnish FA (Suomen Palloliitto)	4th	
1960	Tier 2	Suomensarja (Second Division)	East Group	Finnish FA (Suomen Palloliitto)	4th	
1961	Tier 2	Suomensarja (Second Division)	North Group	Finnish FA (Suomen Palloliitto)	9th	
1962	Tier 2	Suomensarja (Second Division)	North Group	Finnish FA (Suomen Palloliitto)	7th	
1963	Tier 2	Suomensarja (Second Division)	North Group	Finnish FA (Suomen Palloliitto)	5th	
1964	Tier 2	Suomensarja (Second Division)	North Group	Finnish FA (Suomen Palloliitto)	7th	
1965	Tier 2	Suomensarja (Second Division)	North Group	Finnish FA (Suomen Palloliitto)	4th	
1966	Tier 2	Suomensarja (Second Division)	North Group	Finnish FA (Suomen Palloliitto)	2nd	
1967	Tier 2	Suomensarja (Second Division)	North Group	Finnish FA (Suomen Palloliitto)	3rd	
1968	Tier 2	Suomensarja (Second Division)	East Group	Finnish FA (Suomen Palloliitto)	3rd	
1969	Tier 2	Suomensarja (Second Division)	North Group	Finnish FA (Suomen Palloliitto)	6th	
1970	Tier 2	II Divisioona (Second Division)	North Group	Finnish FA (Suomen Palloliitto)	3rd	
1971	Tier 2	II Divisioona (Second Division)	North Group	Finnish FA (Suomen Palloliitto)	5th	
1972	Tier 2	II Divisioona (Second Division)	North Group	Finnish FA (Suomen Palloliitto)	10th	
1973	Tier 3	II Divisioona (Second Division)	North Group	Finnish FA (Suomen Palloliitto)	2nd	Promoted
1974	Tier 2	I Divisioona (First Division)		Finnish FA (Suomen Palloliitto)	8th	
1975	Tier 2	I Divisioona (First Division)		Finnish FA (Suomen Palloliitto)	11th	Relegated
1976	Tier 3	II Divisioona (Second Division)	North Group	Finnish FA (Suomen Palloliitto)	5th	
1977	Tier 3	II Divisioona (Second Division)	North Group	Finnish FA (Suomen Palloliitto)	3rd	
1978	Tier 3	II Divisioona (Second Division)	North Group	Finnish FA (Suomen Palloliitto)	3rd	
1979	Tier 3	II Divisioona (Second Division)	North Group	Finnish FA (Suomen Palloliitto)	4th	
1980	Tier 3	II Divisioona (Second Division)	North Group	Finnish FA (Suomen Palloliitto)	7th	
1981	Tier 3	II Divisioona (Second Division)	North Group	Finnish FA (Suomen Palloliitto)	3rd	
1982	Tier 3	II Divisioona (Second Division)	North Group	Finnish FA (Suomen Palloliitto)	2nd	Promotion Playoff
1983	Tier 3	II Divisioona (Second Division)	North Group	Finnish FA (Suomen Palloliitto)	1st	Promotion Playoff - Promoted
1984	Tier 2	I Divisioona (First Division)		Finnish FA (Suomen Palloliitto)	10th	Relegated
1985	Tier 3	II Divisioona (Second Division)	North Group	Finnish FA (Suomen Palloliitto)	3rd	
1986	Tier 3	II Divisioona (Second Division)	North Group	Finnish FA (Suomen Palloliitto)	1st	Promoted
1987	Tier 2	I Divisioona (First Division)		Finnish FA (Suomen Palloliitto)	11th	Relegated
1988	Tier 3	II Divisioona (Second Division)	North Group	Finnish FA (Suomen Palloliitto)	4th	
1989	Tier 3	II Divisioona (Second Division)	North Group	Finnish FA (Suomen Palloliitto)	8th	
1990	Tier 3	II Divisioona (Second Division)	North Group	Finnish FA (Suomen Palloliitto)	10th	Relegated
1991	Tier 4	III Divisioona (Third Division)	Group 7	Northern Finland(SPL Pohjois-Suomi)	1st	Promoted
1992	Tier 3	II Divisioona (Second Division)	North Group	Finnish FA (Suomen Palloliitto)	7th	
1993	Tier 3	Kakkonen (Second Division)	North Group	Finnish FA (Suomen Palloliitto)	12th	Relegated
1994	Tier 4	Kolmonen (Third Division)	Group 8/A	Northern Finland(SPL Pohjois-Suomi)	4th	
1995	Tier 4	Kolmonen (Third Division)	Group 6	Northern Finland(SPL Pohjois-Suomi)	2nd	Promoted
1996	Tier 3	Kakkonen (Second Division)	North Group	Finnish FA (Suomen Palloliitto)	12th	Relegated
1997	Tier 4	Kolmonen (Third Division)	Group 8 - Oulu-Kainuu	Northern Finland(SPL Pohjois-Suomi)	3rd	
1998	Tier 4	Kolmonen (Third Division)	Group 8 - Oulu-Kainuu	Northern Finland(SPL Pohjois-Suomi)	1st	Lost championship final and promotion playoff
1999	Tier 4	Kolmonen (Third Division)	Group 8 - Oulu-Kainuu	Northern Finland(SPL Pohjois-Suomi)	1st	Promotion Group 3rd
2000	Tier 4	Kolmonen (Third Division)	Group 8 - Oulu-Kainuu	Northern Finland(SPL Pohjois-Suomi)	1st	Promotion Playoff
2001	Tier 4	Kolmonen (Third Division)	Oulu-Kainuu	Northern Finland(SPL Pohjois-Suomi)	2nd	Promoted
2002	Tier 3	Kakkonen (Second Division)	North Group	Finnish FA (Suomen Palloliitto)	9th	
2003	Tier 3	Kakkonen (Second Division)		Finnish FA (Suomen Palloliitto)		Withdrew
2004	Tier 5	Nelonen (Fourth Division)	Kainuu	Northern Finland(SPL Pohjois-Suomi)	2nd	

- 1 seasons in Mestaruussarja
- 30 seasons in I Divisioona
- 26 season in Kakkonen
- 8 season in Kolmonen
- 1 season in Nelonen
