= Pallo-Pojat Juniorit =

Finnish football club in Helsinki

Pallo-Pojat
- Full name: Pallo-Pojat Juniorit
- Nicknames: PPJ, Pallo-Pojat, Pallo-Pojat-Juniorit
- Founded: 1935; 91 years ago, as Pallo-Pojat; 1995; 31 years ago, as Pallo-Pojat Juniorit
- Chairman: Sami Aurejärvi
- Manager: Mikko Hyppönen
- League: Kakkonen
- 2026: Kakkonen Group A, 5th of 10
Home colours

Pallo-Pojat Juniorit (abbreviated PPJ or PPJ Helsinki) is the 3rd biggest football club in Finland, with 3000 licensed football players, most of whom are under 14 years of age. Pallo-Pojat Juniorit operates locally in southern Helsinki. In locations like Lauttasaari, Jätkäsaari, Eira, Kamppi, Ruoholahti, PPJ is the most dominant club. The club mainly focuses on youth football but also has adults teams for men and women. Girls team T15 won the Finnish Futsal championship in 2025.

PPJ operates at two indoor facilities, Intersport Arena in Jätkäsaari and Lauttasaaren kuplahalli, as well as at several outdoor football pitches.

Before Pallo-Pojat Juniorit (PPJ) was founded in 1995, its predecessor Pallo-Pojat (PP) won the Finnish cup in 1956. They played in Mestaruussarja in 1960 and 1961 seasons but weren't able to compete with bigger traditional Helsinki based clubs HIFK, HJK, HPS and KIF and were relegated to lower levels. In 1995, the club's youth department was separated from rest of the club and named Pallo-Pojat Juniorit, and this club continues the tradition of the original Pallo-Pojat.

== Honours ==
Finnish Cup: 1956

== Season to season ==
Season to Season

Season	Level	Division	Section	Administration	Position	Movements
1938	Tier 3	Maakuntasarja (Third Division)	West, Southern	Finnish FA (Suomen Pallolitto)		Promotion Playoff - Promoted
1939	Tier 2	Itä-Länsi-sarja (Second Division)	West League, Group 1	Finnish FA (Suomen Palloliitto)	3rd	
1940-41	Tier 3	C-Sarja (Third Division)	Group 1	Finnish FA (Suomen Pallolitto)	4th	
1945	Tier 2	Suomensarja (Second Division)	Group A	Finnish FA (Suomen Palloliitto)	5th	Relegated
1945-46	Tier 3	Maakuntasarja (Third Division)	Helsinki Group II	Finnish FA (Suomen Pallolitto)	1st	Promotion Playoff
1946-47	Tier 3	Maakuntasarja (Third Division)	Helsinki Group I	Finnish FA (Suomen Pallolitto)	4th	
1947-48	Tier 3	Maakuntasarja (Third Division)	Helsinki Group II	Finnish FA (Suomen Pallolitto)	6th	Relegated
1948-49		Piirinsarja (District Leagues)		Helsinki District (SPL Helsinki)		
1950	Tier 4	Piirinsarja (District League)	South Group	Helsinki District (SPL Helsinki)		Promotion Playoff - Promoted
1951	Tier 3	Maakuntasarja (Third Division)	South Group A	Finnish FA (Suomen Pallolitto)	2nd	
1952	Tier 3	Maakuntasarja (Third Division)	South Group A	Finnish FA (Suomen Pallolitto)	1st	Promotion Group East 4th
1953	Tier 3	Maakuntasarja (Third Division)	South Group A	Finnish FA (Suomen Pallolitto)	1st	Promotion Group East 2nd - Promoted
1954	Tier 2	Suomensarja (Second Division)	East Group	Finnish FA (Suomen Palloliitto)	4th	
1955	Tier 2	Suomensarja (Second Division)	East Group	Finnish FA (Suomen Palloliitto)	2nd	
1956	Tier 2	Suomensarja (Second Division)	East Group	Finnish FA (Suomen Palloliitto)	6th	
1957	Tier 2	Suomensarja (Second Division)	East Group	Finnish FA (Suomen Palloliitto)	4th	
1958	Tier 2	Suomensarja (Second Division)	South Group	Finnish FA (Suomen Palloliitto)	1st	Promoted
1959	Tier 1	Mestaruussarja (Premier Division)		Finnish FA (Suomen Palloliitto)	9th	
1960	Tier 1	Mestaruussarja (Premier Division)		Finnish FA (Suomen Palloliitto)	7th	
1961	Tier 1	Mestaruussarja (Premier Division)		Finnish FA (Suomen Palloliitto)	11th	Relegated
1962	Tier 2	Suomensarja (Second Division)	East Group	Finnish FA (Suomen Palloliitto)	8th	
1963	Tier 2	Suomensarja (Second Division)	East Group	Finnish FA (Suomen Palloliitto)	6th	
1964	Tier 2	Suomensarja (Second Division)	East Group	Finnish FA (Suomen Palloliitto)	7th	
1965	Tier 2	Suomensarja (Second Division)	East Group	Finnish FA (Suomen Palloliitto)	10th	Relegation Playoff - Relegated
1966	Tier 3	Maakuntasarja (Third Division)	Group 1	Finnish FA (Suomen Pallolitto)	6th	
1967	Tier 3	Maakuntasarja (Third Division)	Group 1	Finnish FA (Suomen Pallolitto)	6th	
1968	Tier 3	Maakuntasarja (Third Division)	Group 1	Finnish FA (Suomen Pallolitto)	4th	
1969	Tier 3	Maakuntasarja (Third Division)	Group 1	Finnish FA (Suomen Pallolitto)	7th	
1970	Tier 3	III Divisioona (Third Division)	Group 1	Finnish FA (Suomen Pallolitto)	2nd	
1971	Tier 3	III Divisioona (Third Division)	Group 4	Finnish FA (Suomen Pallolitto)	9th	
1972	Tier 3	III Divisioona (Third Division)	Group 1	Finnish FA (Suomen Pallolitto)	9th	Relegation Group I 1st
1973	Tier 4	III Divisioona (Third Division)	Group 1	Finnish FA (Suomen Pallolitto)	3rd	
1974	Tier 4	III Divisioona (Third Division)	Group 2	Finnish FA (Suomen Pallolitto)	4th	
1975	Tier 4	III Divisioona (Third Division)	Group 2	Finnish FA (Suomen Pallolitto)	9th	Relegated
1976	Tier 5	IV Divisioona (Fourth Division)	Group 1	Finnish FA (Suomen Pallolitto)	1st	Promoted
1977	Tier 4	III Divisioona (Third Division)	Group 2	Finnish FA (Suomen Pallolitto)	9th	Relegation Playoff - Relegated
1978	Tier 5	IV Divisioona (Fourth Division)	Group 4	Finnish FA (Suomen Pallolitto)	4th	
1979	Tier 5	IV Divisioona (Fourth Division)	Group 3	Finnish FA (Suomen Pallolitto)	3rd	
1980	Tier 5	IV Divisioona (Fourth Division)	Group 3	Finnish FA (Suomen Pallolitto)	3rd	
1981	Tier 5	IV Divisioona (Fourth Division)	Group 1	Finnish FA (Suomen Pallolitto)	4th	
1982	Tier 5	IV Divisioona (Fourth Division)	Group 2	Finnish FA (Suomen Pallolitto)	2nd	Promotion Playoff
1983	Tier 5	IV Divisioona (Fourth Division)	Group 1	Finnish FA (Suomen Pallolitto)	4th	
1984	Tier 5	IV Divisioona (Fourth Division)	Group 3	Finnish FA (Suomen Pallolitto)	2nd	Promotion Playoff - Promoted
1985	Tier 4	III Divisioona (Third Division)	Group 1	Finnish FA (Suomen Pallolitto)	5th	
1986	Tier 4	III Divisioona (Third Division)	Group 2	Finnish FA (Suomen Pallolitto)	6th	
1987	Tier 4	III Divisioona (Third Division)	Group 2	Finnish FA (Suomen Pallolitto)	5th	
1988	Tier 4	III Divisioona (Third Division)	Group 1	Finnish FA (Suomen Pallolitto)	1st	Promoted
1989	Tier 3	II Divisioona (Second Division)	East Group	Finnish FA (Suomen Pallolitto)	11th	Relegated
1990	Tier 4	III Divisioona (Third Division)	Group 2	Finnish FA (Suomen Pallolitto)	12th	Relegated
1991	Tier 5	IV Divisioona (Fourth Division)	Group 3	Helsinki District (SPL Helsinki)	10th	
1992	Tier 5	IV Divisioona (Fourth Division)	Group 1	Helsinki District (SPL Helsinki)	11th	Relegated
1993-97	Unknown					
1998	Tier 6	Vitonen (Fifth Division)		Helsinki District (SPL Helsinki)		
1999	Tier 5	Nelonen (Fourth Division)	Group 3	Helsinki District (SPL Helsinki)	9th	
2000	Tier 5	Nelonen (Fourth Division)	Group 3	Helsinki District (SPL Helsinki)	1st	Promoted
2001	Tier 4	Kolmonen (Third Division)	Group 2	Helsinki District (SPL Helsinki)	11th	Relegated
2002	Tier 5	Nelonen (Fourth Division)	Group 1	Helsinki District (SPL Helsinki)	5th	
2003	Tier 5	Nelonen (Fourth Division)	Group 1	Helsinki District (SPL Helsinki)	1st	Promoted
2004	Tier 4	Kolmonen (Third Division)	Group 2	Helsinki District (SPL Helsinki)	11th	Relegated
2005	Tier 5	Nelonen (Fourth Division)	Group 1	Helsinki District (SPL Helsinki)	4th	
2006	Tier 5	Nelonen (Fourth Division)	Group 1	Helsinki District (SPL Helsinki)	10th	
2007	Tier 5	Nelonen (Fourth Division)	Group 1	Helsinki District (SPL Helsinki)	10th	
2008	Tier 5	Nelonen (Fourth Division)	Group 2	Helsinki District (SPL Helsinki)	11th	Relegated
2013	Tier 6	Vitonen (Fifth Division)	Group 2	Helsinki District (SPL Helsinki)	2nd	Promoted
2014	Tier 5	Nelonen (Fourth Division)	Group 1	Helsinki District (SPL Helsinki)	1st	Promoted PPJ Lauttasaari
2015	Tier 4	Kolmonen (Third Division)	Group 2	Helsinki District (SPL Helsinki)	9th	
2016	Tier 4	Kolmonen (Third Division)	Group 1	Helsinki District (SPL Helsinki)	2nd	
2017	Tier 4	Kolmonen (Third Division)	Group 2	Helsinki District (SPL Helsinki)	11th	Relegated
2018	Tier 5	Nelonen (Fourth Division)	Group 1	Helsinki District (SPL Helsinki)	4th	
2019	Tier 5	Nelonen (Fourth Division)	Group 3	Helsinki District (SPL Helsinki)	3rd	
2020	Tier 5	Nelonen (Fourth Division)	Group 2	Southern	2nd	Promoted
2021	Tier 4	Kolmonen (Third Division)	Group B	Southern		
2022	Tier 3	Kakkonen (Second Division)	Group A	Finnish FA (Suomen Palloliitto)	8th	
2023	Tier 3	Kakkonen (Second Division)	Group A	Finnish FA (Suomen Palloliitto)	Ongoing	

- 3 seasons in Mestaruussarja
- 11 seasons in Suomensarja/Ykkönen
- 16 seasons in Maakuntasarja/Kakkonen
- 16 seasons in Kolmonen
- 22 seasons in Nelonen
- 2 seasons in Vitonen
- 2 seasons in Kakkonen
