= 1967 Mestaruussarja =

Mestaruussarja
- Season: 1967
- Champions: Reipas Lahti
- Relegated: ÅIFK Turku, Ilves-Kissat Tampere

Statistics of Mestaruussarja in the 1967 season.

== Overview ==
It was contested by 12 teams, and Reipas Lahti won the championship.

== League standings ==
Pos	Team	Pld	W	D	L	GF	GA	GD	Pts
1	Reipas Lahti (C)	22	14	4	4	55	27	+28	32
2	KuPS Kuopio	22	12	6	4	28	17	+11	30
3	TPS Turku	22	13	2	7	51	28	+23	28
4	Upon Pallo Lahti	22	10	6	6	29	19	+10	26
5	HJK Helsinki	22	11	3	8	59	38	+21	25
6	Haka Valkeakoski	22	9	6	7	37	23	+14	24
7	KTP Kotka	22	7	6	9	32	34	−2	20
8	KPV Kokkola	22	5	9	8	19	25	−6	19
9	VPS Vaasa	22	5	9	8	27	43	−16	19
10	MP Mikkeli	22	5	7	10	24	42	−18	17
11	ÅIFK Turku (R)	22	5	5	12	32	43	−11	15
12	Ilves-Kissat Tampere (R)	22	4	1	17	19	73	−54	9

Source: rsssf.com
(C) Champions; (R) Relegated

== Results ==
Home \ Away	HAK	HJK	ILV	KPV	KTP	KPS	MP	REI	TPS	UP	VPS	ÅIF
FC Haka		3–2	0–1	3–0	0–1	0–1	2–0	9–1	3–0	2–1	2–2	0–0
HJK Helsinki	0–1		4–0	2–1	5–2	0–2	2–0	1–5	1–3	1–4	8–1	8–1
I-Kissat	1–3	0–7		0–1	2–0	1–0	0–1	1–5	0–4	0–4	3–1	1–4
KPV	0–0	1–1	3–1		0–0	0–1	2–2	2–0	0–0	2–0	1–1	1–0
KTP	0–0	0–1	5–1	4–1		1–1	3–1	1–1	1–2	0–1	1–1	2–0
KuPS	3–2	1–1	1–0	1–1	4–0		2–0	1–3	2–0	0–0	0–0	1–1
MP	3–3	3–6	1–0	1–0	3–3	0–1		1–6	1–0	0–0	2–2	0–1
Reipas	1–0	2–3	7–0	2–0	4–0	3–0	1–1		2–2	2–0	1–1	3–1
TPS	4–2	2–1	11–2	2–1	0–2	1–2	3–0	2–0		3–0	4–1	3–1
UPallo	1–0	5–1	2–2	2–0	2–1	0–1	1–1	0–2	1–0		0–0	1–0
VPS	1–2	0–3	3–2	1–1	2–1	1–0	0–2	1–2	3–2	1–1		4–0
ÅIFK	0–0	1–1	6–1	1–1	2–4	2–3	4–1	0–2	2–3	0–3	5–0	

Legend: Blue = home team win; Yellow = draw; Red = away team win.
