= Suomensarja =

2nd level football league in Finland from 1936 to 1972

Suomensarja (sometimes also Suomi-sarja) (‘Finland Series’) was the second highest level of league format association football in Finland from 1936 to 1972.

Before the inauguration of the Suomensarja, there had been, in 1930–1935, special qualification matches for the right to play in the Mestaruussarja, ‘Championship series’. A proper league format competition on this level began in 1936 with the 1936 Suomensarja.

In the autumn of 1969, the Finnish football underwent a league system reform, and the Suomensarja was renamed II divisioona, or 2nd Division, with regional sections.

In 1973, this level of football in Finland became nationwide, and the new name was 1. divisioona, present-day Ykkönen.

The format of the competition on the second level of league format football in Finland changed several times over the years. Suomensarja had regional sections, with the best teams in each section finally competing against each other for promotion into the Mestaruussarja. The number of regional sections would vary from two to six.
