= Mikkelin Pallo-Kissat =

Finnish football club

- Full name: Mikkelin Pallo-Kissat
- Nickname: Kissat (The Cats)
- Founded: 1946; 80 years ago
- Ground: Mikkelin Urheilupuisto, Mikkeli, Finland
- Capacity: 7,000
- Chairman: Jyri Paasonen
- Manager: Osseias Graciano
Home colours

Mikkelin Pallo-Kissat (or MiPK) is a Finnish football club, based in Mikkeli.

== Background ==
MiPK was founded in 1946, after footballers from local sports club Vauhti, wanted their own club specialized in ball games. MiPK is a member of Finnish Workers' Sports Federation. In early 1980s the club was driven into financial difficulties and their final season was in 1983, new club called Mikkelin Kissat was formed to continue clubs operations. MiPK was able to avoid bankruptcy and in 1997 they re-joined Finnish FA. Since 2016 Mikkelin Kissat has used Mikkelin Pallo-Kissat as their men's name as a homage to original MiPK. In 2020 Mikkelin Kissat continued as a Mikkelin Pallo-Kissat. MiPK shares a local rivalry with MP, in the past MiPK was considered as a working class club while MP was more middle class.

1959 colours

== Season to season ==
Season to season

Season	Level	Division	Section	Administration	Position	Movements
1954	Tier 3	Maakuntasarja (Third Division)	Central Group I	Finnish FA (Suomen Pallolitto)	1st	Promotion Group East 5th
1955	Tier 3	Maakuntasarja (Third Division)	East Group II	Finnish FA (Suomen Pallolitto)	2nd	
1956	Tier 3	Maakuntasarja (Third Division)	East Group II	Finnish FA (Suomen Pallolitto)	2nd	
1957	Tier 3	Maakuntasarja (Third Division)	East Group I	Finnish FA (Suomen Pallolitto)	4th	
1958	Tier 3	Maakuntasarja (Third Division)	Group 6	Finnish FA (Suomen Pallolitto)	1st	Promoted
1959	Tier 2	Suomensarja (Second Division)	East Group	Finnish FA (Suomen Pallolitto)	3rd	
1960	Tier 2	Suomensarja (Second Division)	East Group	Finnish FA (Suomen Pallolitto)	7th	
1961	Tier 2	Suomensarja (Second Division)	East Group	Finnish FA (Suomen Pallolitto)	1st	Promoted
1962	Tier 1	Mestaruussarja		Finnish FA (Suomen Palloliitto	4th	
1963	Tier 1	Mestaruussarja		Finnish FA (Suomen Palloliitto	7th	
1964	Tier 1	Mestaruussarja		Finnish FA (Suomen Palloliitto	11th	Relegated
1965	Tier 2	Suomensarja (Second Division)	East Group	Finnish FA (Suomen Pallolitto)	2nd	
1966	Tier 2	Suomensarja (Second Division)	East Group	Finnish FA (Suomen Pallolitto)	4th	
1967	Tier 2	Suomensarja (Second Division)	East Group	Finnish FA (Suomen Pallolitto)	5th	
1968	Tier 2	Suomensarja (Second Division)	East Group	Finnish FA (Suomen Pallolitto)	8th	
1969	Tier 2	Suomensarja (Second Division)	East Group	Finnish FA (Suomen Pallolitto)	3rd	
1970	Tier 2	II Divisioona (Second Division)	East Group	Finnish FA (Suomen Pallolitto)	1st	Promoted
1971	Tier 1	Mestaruussarja		Finnish FA (Suomen Palloliitto	13th	Relegated
1972	Tier 2	II Divisioona (Second Division)	East Group	Finnish FA (Suomen Pallolitto)	2nd	Qualified to new I Divisioona
1973	Tier 2	I divisioona (First Division)		Finnish FA (Suomen Pallolitto)	1st	Promoted
1974	Tier 1	Mestaruussarja		Finnish FA (Suomen Palloliitto	4th	
1975	Tier 1	Mestaruussarja		Finnish FA (Suomen Palloliitto	4th	
1976	Tier 1	Mestaruussarja		Finnish FA (Suomen Palloliitto	5th	
1977	Tier 1	Mestaruussarja		Finnish FA (Suomen Palloliitto	9th	
1978	Tier 1	Mestaruussarja		Finnish FA (Suomen Palloliitto	6th	
1979	Tier 1	Mestaruussarja		Finnish FA (Suomen Palloliitto	12th	Relegation Group 7th - Relegated
1980	Tier 2	I divisioona (First Division)		Finnish FA (Suomen Pallolitto)	3rd	Promotion Group 4th - Promoted
1981	Tier 1	Mestaruussarja		Finnish FA (Suomen Palloliitto	12th	Relegation Group 8th - Relegated
1982	Tier 2	I divisioona (First Division)		Finnish FA (Suomen Pallolitto)	10th	Relegation Group 7th - Relegated
1983	Tier 3	II Divisioona (Second Division)	East Group	Finnish FA (Suomen Pallolitto)	10th	Relegated - Operations ceased.

- 11 seasons in Mestaruussarja
- 13 seasons in Ykkönen
- 6 seasons in Kakkonen
