= Mestaruussarja =

Top Finnish football league from 1930 to 1989

Mestaruussarja (Championship series) was the top division of Finnish football from 1930 to 1989. It was replaced by Veikkausliiga in 1990.

In 1930 league format was used for the first time to decide the Finnish champion. Before that (1908-1929) the championship was decided by cup competition. The league was dominated by clubs from Helsinki, Turku and Vyborg. The first champion was HIFK Football from Helsinki. In 1935, the four best clubs were from Helsinki; and in 1934 and 1936 the top three clubs also came from Helsinki. From 1908 to 1940, the championship went outside Helsinki on only six occasions. Kuopio was the first inland city to get into the league when Pallotoverit were promoted in 1938. During World War II years the league was sometimes cut short, abandoned or decided with cup competition instead. In 1940s TUL clubs also participated.

The last Mestaruussarja season was 1989 and FC Kuusysi was crowned as the last champions. The new top level division was at first called SM-liiga and later renamed Veikkausliiga.

Mestaruussarja consisted of eight clubs when it was founded. It was later expanded to ten and at the time of dissolution league had 12 clubs. The league's popularity peaked in the 1960s. Ten HJK matches between 1964 and 1969 had more than 10,000 spectators. The highest attendance was 17,293 between HJK and FC Haka in 1965. The highest average attendance was 3,071 in 1967, a figure that is yet to be beaten by the current Veikkausliiga.

== Champions ==
- 1930: HIFK
- 1931: HIFK
- 1932: HPS
- 1933: HIFK
- 1934: HPS
- 1935: HPS
- 1936: HJK
- 1937: HIFK
- 1938: HJK
- 1939: TPS
- 1940: Sudet
- 1941: TPS
- 1942: HT
- 1943: Not played due to World War II.
- 1944: VIFK
- 1945: VPS
- 1946: VIFK
- 1947: HIFK
- 1948: VPS
- 1949: TPS
- 1950: Ilves-Kissat
- 1951: KTP
- 1952: KTP
- 1953: VIFK
- 1954: Pyrkivä
- 1955: Kiffen
- 1956: KuPS
- 1957: HPS
- 1958: KuPS
- 1959: HIFK
- 1960: Haka
- 1961: HIFK
- 1962: Haka
- 1963: Reipas Lahti
- 1964: HJK
- 1965: Haka
- 1966: KuPS
- 1967: Reipas Lahti
- 1968: TPS
- 1969: KPV
- 1970: Reipas Lahti
- 1971: TPS
- 1972: TPS
- 1973: HJK
- 1974: KuPS
- 1975: TPS
- 1976: KuPS
- 1977: Haka
- 1978: HJK
- 1979: OPS
- 1980: OPS
- 1981: HJK
- 1982: Kuusysi
- 1983: Ilves
- 1984: Kuusysi
- 1985: HJK
- 1986: Kuusysi
- 1987: HJK
- 1988: HJK
- 1989: Kuusysi

== Top scorers ==
| Season | Player | Club | Goals |
|---|---|---|---|
| 1930 | Holger Salin | HIFK | 9 |
| 1930 | Olof Strömsten | Kiffen | 9 |
| 1931 | Holger Salin | HIFK | 11 |
| 1932 | Lauri Lehtinen | TPS | 13 |
| 1933 | Olof Strömsten | HIFK | 18 |
| 1934 | Olof Strömsten | HIFK | 15 |
| 1935 | Aatos Lehtonen | HJK | 13 |
| 1935 | Nuutti Lintamo | VPS | 13 |
| 1936 | Aatos Lehtonen | HJK | 14 |
| 1937 | Aatos Lehtonen | HJK | 25 |
| 1938 | Aatos Lehtonen | HJK | 14 |
| 1939 | Aatos Lehtonen | HJK | 15 |
| 1941 | Jussi Valtonen | TPS | 14 |
| 1944 | Urho Teräs | TPS | 9 |
| 1944 | Leo Turunen | Sudet | 9 |
| 1948 | Stig-Göran Myntti | VIFK | 15 |
| 1949 | Yrjö Asikainen | Ilves-Kissat | 20 |
| 1949 | Kaimo Lintamo | VPS | 20 |
| 1950 | Yrjö Asikainen | Ilves-Kissat | 15 |
| 1950 | Jorma Saarinen | VPS | 15 |
| 1951 | Åke Forsberg | Kiffen | 16 |
| 1952 | Mauri Vanhanen | KTP | 16 |
| 1953 | Rainer Forss | Pyrkivä | 15 |
| 1954 | Eino Koskinen | TuTo | 16 |
| 1955 | Yrjö Asikainen | Kiffen | 12 |
| 1956 | Pentti Styck | HJK | 20 |
| 1957 | Matti Sundelin | TPS | 21 |
| 1958 | Kalevi Lehtovirta | TPS | 17 |
| 1958 | Kai Pahlman | HPS | 17 |
| 1959 | Matti Sundelin | TPS | 21 |
| 1960 | Matti Sundelin | TPS | 30 |
| 1961 | Kai Pahlman | HPS | 20 |
| 1962 | Tor Österlund | HIK | 22 |
| 1963 | Juha Lyytikäinen | HIFK | 16 |
| 1964 | Arto Tolsa | KTP | 26 |
| 1965 | Kai Pahlman | HJK | 22 |
| 1966 | Markku Hyvärinen | KuPS | 16 |
| 1967 | Tommy Lindholm | TPS | 22 |
| 1968 | Tommy Lindholm | TPS | 23 |
| 1969 | Hannu Lamberg | KPV | 18 |
| 1969 | Pekka Talaslahti | HJK | 18 |
| 1970 | Matti Paatelainen | HIFK | 20 |
| 1971 | Pentti Toivola | MP | 17 |
| 1972 | Matti Paatelainen | HIFK | 16 |
| 1972 | Heikki Suhonen | TPS | 16 |
| 1973 | Hannu Lamberg | KPV | 13 |
| 1974 | Erkki Salo | TPS | 17 |
| 1975 | Reijo Rantanen | MiPK | 16 |
| 1976 | Matti Paatelainen | Haka | 17 |
| 1977 | Matti Paatelainen | Haka | 20 |
| 1978 | Atik Ismail | HJK | 20 |
| 1979 | Atik Ismail | HJK | 15 |
| 1979 | Heikki Suhonen | TPS | 15 |
| 1980 | Hannu Rajaniemi | Sepsi-78 | 19 |
| 1981 | Juhani Himanka | OPS | 22 |
| 1982 | Atik Ismail | HJK | 19 |
| 1983 | Mika Lipponen | TPS | 22 |
| 1984 | Mika Lipponen | TPS | 25 |
| 1985 | Ismo Lius | Kuusysi | 19 |
| 1986 | Ismo Lius | Kuusysi | 13 |
| 1986 | Jari Niinimäki | Ilves | 13 |
| 1987 | Ari Hjelm | Ilves | 20 |
| 1988 | Ismo Lius | Kuusysi | 22 |
| 1989 | Ismo Lius | Kuusysi | 15 |
