= Veikkausliiga =

Finnish top-tier association football league

Veikkausliiga (in Finnish) Tipsligan (in Swedish)
- Founded: 1990; 36 years ago
- Country: Finland
- Confederation: UEFA
- Number of clubs: 12
- Level on pyramid: 1
- Relegation to: Ykkösliiga 1–2 (depending on qualification playoffs)
- Domestic cup: Finnish Cup
- League cup: Finnish League Cup
- International cup(s): UEFA Champions League; UEFA Conference League
- Current champions: Inter Turku (2026)
- Most championships: HJK Helsinki (17) (Note: HJK has 33 total championships, but only 17 of them are during the Veikkausliiga era)
- Most appearances: Toni Huttunen (441)
- Top scorer: Valeri Popovitch (166)
- Broadcasters: Ruutu+, Nelonen, Jim, (Yle); International: OneFootball
- Website: veikkausliiga.com
- Current: 2026 Veikkausliiga

Veikkausliiga (Finnish pronunciation: [ˈʋei̯kːɑusˌliːɡɑ]) is a professional association football league in Finland and the highest level of the Finnish football league system. The league comprises the top 12 clubs of the country. Its main sponsor is the Finnish national betting agency Veikkaus, hence the league's name. Veikkausliiga was founded in 1990; before that the top division was called Mestaruussarja (championship series) since 1930 which was an amateur or semi-professional league. Between 1908 and 1930 the championship was decided as a knock-out cup competition.

== Structure ==
During the 1990 and 1991 seasons the Veikkausliiga was played under the name "Futisliiga" (Swedish: Fotbollsligan).

As with certain other cold-climate European countries, league matches in Finland are played in summer, with a schedule usually from April to October. The format and number of teams has changed frequently. As of 2024, there are 12 teams, which first face the other teams twice in the regular season. After the regular season, the league is divided into championship round (6 teams) and relegation round (6 teams), and teams in both groups play five further matches, with points from the regular season carrying on as usual. The total number of matches in a season is thus 27. At the end of the season, the last team is relegated to Ykkönen (from 2024 to new-created tier 2, Ykkösliiga), whose winner is promoted to Veikkausliiga, and the second last team plays a two-leg play-off versus the Ykkönen (from 2024, versus Ykkösliiga) runner-up.

In 2010 the average annual salary with fringe benefits for a league player was 24,400 euros. During the 2022 season, the highest earning league players earned just shy of €200,000. Veikkausliiga is a founding member of the European Professional Football Leagues association.

During 2019–2024, the certain Veikkausliiga Europa Play-offs were played after the season to decide the one remaining European qualifying spot for the next season. In late November 2024, it was announced the Europa Play-offs would be abolished for the 2025, and the league format would be changed. After 22 rounds (each team had played against each other twice), the last six teams will play a single relegation round, totalling 27 matches, and the six best teams continue to a double championship round, totalling 32 matches.

== Management ==
Chairmen

- Kari Kontuniemi (1989–1991)
- Matti Pelttari (1991–1996)
- Olli Rehn (1996–1997)
- Ari Lahti (1997–2001)
- Jussi Sarvikas (2001–2005)
- Hannu Rautiainen (2005–2010)
- Lasse Lehtinen (2010–2017)
- Matti Apunen (2017–2020)
- Kaarlo Kankkunen (2020–present)

CEOs

- Jukka Suominen (1989–1997)
- Mika Eskola (1997–2000)
- Jan Walden (2000–2010)
- Timo Marjamaa (2010–present)

== Television rights ==
Since 2015, the TV rights for Veikkausliiga have been owned by Sanoma Media Finland, and all the matches are broadcast in their online streaming service Ruutu+. Current deal is valued €3.9 million and it covers the seasons 2023–2027. Since the 2023 season, the national broadcasting company Yle shows 6–7 matches per season freely in the national television, according to contract with Nelonen Media. The international broadcasting rights are owned by OneFootball.

Previously Veikkausliiga matches have been broadcast by Yle, Nelonen, Urheilukanava, Canal+, URHOtv, Kutonen and VeikkausTV, the streaming service of Veikkaus. The contract between the league and URHOtv covered the 2010–2014 seasons, but ended in April 2014 after URHOtv was shut down.

== Current clubs ==
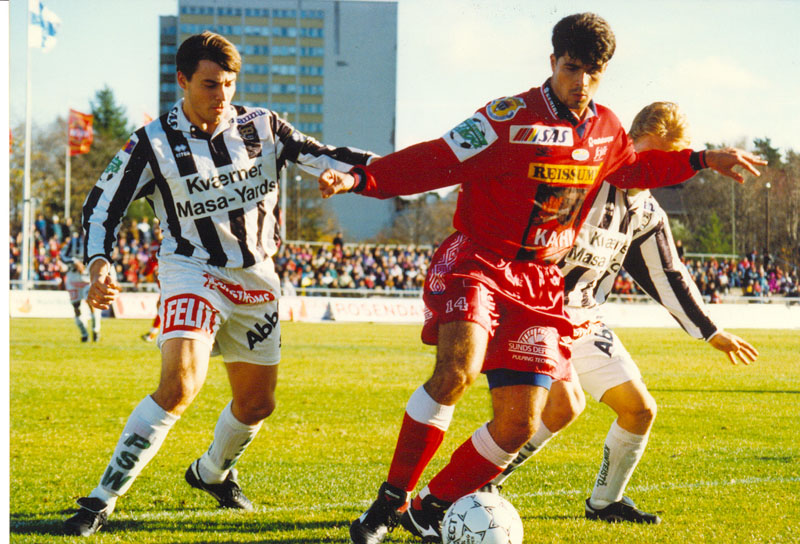
Veikkausliiga match between FC Jazz and TPS in Pori Stadium in 1996

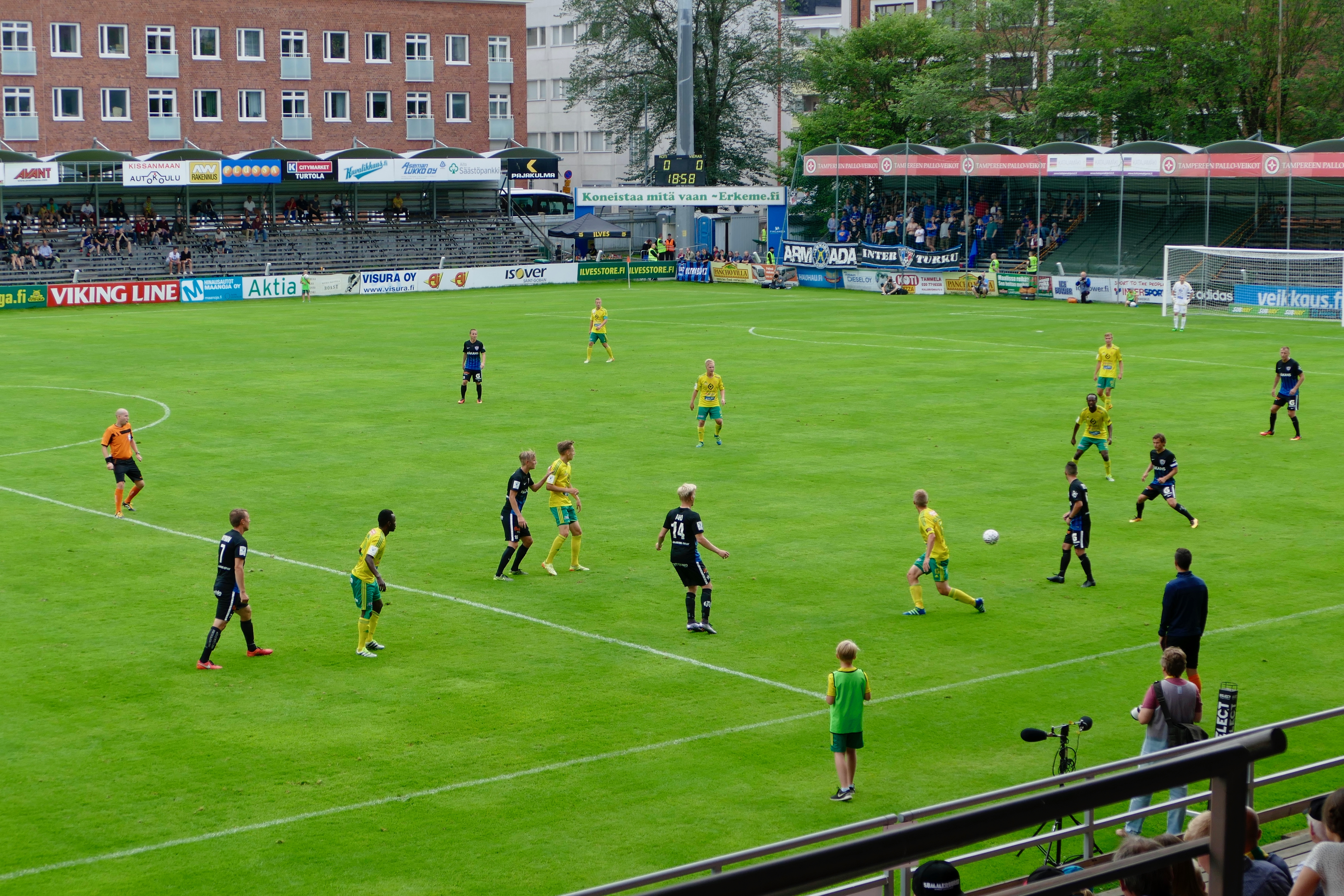
Football teams FC Ilves and FC Inter in a Veikkausliiga match at old Tammela Stadium in Tampere, Finland, in August 2016.

The Veikkausliiga clubs in the 2026 season are presented in the table below. Number of seasons includes seasons played in Veikkausliiga and preceding Mestaruussarja and seasons of predecessor teams after season 2025. In the case of mergers, the seasons of the predecessor with the most seasons are counted.

Club	City	Stadium	Capacity	2025 position	Number of seasons*
AC Oulu	Oulu	Heinäpää Football Stadium	5,080	10th	7
FC Lahti	Lahti	Lahti Stadium	7,465	1st in Ykkösliiga	52
FC Inter Turku	Turku	Veritas Stadion	9,372	2nd	29
FF Jaro	Jakobstad	Project Liv Arena	3,616	7th	24
HJK	Helsinki	Bolt Arena	10,770	5th	87
IF Gnistan	Helsinki	Mustapekka Areena	2,610	6th	2
IFK Mariehamn	Mariehamn	Wiklöf Holding Arena	1,650	8th	21
Ilves	Tampere	Tammelan Stadion	8,000	3rd	44
KuPS	Kuopio	Väre Areena	5,000	1st, Champions	69
SJK	Seinäjoki	OmaSP Stadion	5,817	4th	15
TPS	Turku	Veritas Stadion	9,372	2nd in Ykkösliiga	76
VPS	Vaasa	Lemonsoft Stadion	4,660	9th	61

== Former clubs ==
Former logo of Veikkausliiga

Club	Home town	Seasons
AC Allianssi	Vantaa	2002–2005
Atlantis FC	Helsinki	2001
Ekenäs IF	Raseborg	2024
FC Honka	Espoo	2006–2014, 2018-2023
FC Hämeenlinna	Hämeenlinna	2002–2004
FC Jazz^{1}	Pori	1991–2004
FC Jokerit	Helsinki	1999–2001, 2003
FC KooTeePee	Kotka	2003–2008
FC Kuusysi^{2}	Lahti	1990–1995
FC Lahti	Lahti	1999–2010, 2012–2024
FC Oulu	Oulu	1992, 1994
FC Viikingit	Helsinki	2007
FinnPa	Helsinki	1993–1998
HIFK	Helsinki	2015-2017, 2019-2022
JJK	Jyväskylä	2009–2013, 2017
KPV	Kokkola	1990, 2019
Kumu	Kuusankoski	1990
MP	Mikkeli	1990–1996
MyPa	Kouvola	1992–2014
OTP	Oulu	1990–1991
PK-35	Helsinki	1998
PK-35 Vantaa	Vantaa	2016
Ponnistus	Helsinki	1995
Reipas^{2}	Lahti	1990–1991
RoPS	Rovaniemi	1990-2001, 2004-2005, 2008-2009, 2011, 2013-2020
TPV	Tampere	1993–1995, 1999
Tampere United^{3}	Tampere	2000–2010
TPS	Turku	1990-2000, 2003-2014, 2018, 2020
TP-Seinäjoki	Seinäjoki	1997
TP-47	Tornio	2004–2005

^{1) FC Jazz was formerly known as PPT (Porin Pallotoverit).}
^{2) Kuusysi and Reipas merged their professional teams in 1996 to form FC Lahti. Kuusysi returned to Kakkonen in 2011 under the name Lahti Akatemia, while Reipas returned to Kolmonen one year later.}
^{3) Tampere United was formed in 1998 after it inherited the place of FC Ilves. Tampere United was dissolved in 2011 and Ilves, which in the meantime had bought the place of KooVee in second division, got promoted back to the highest league in 2015.}

== Veikkausliiga 1990–present ==
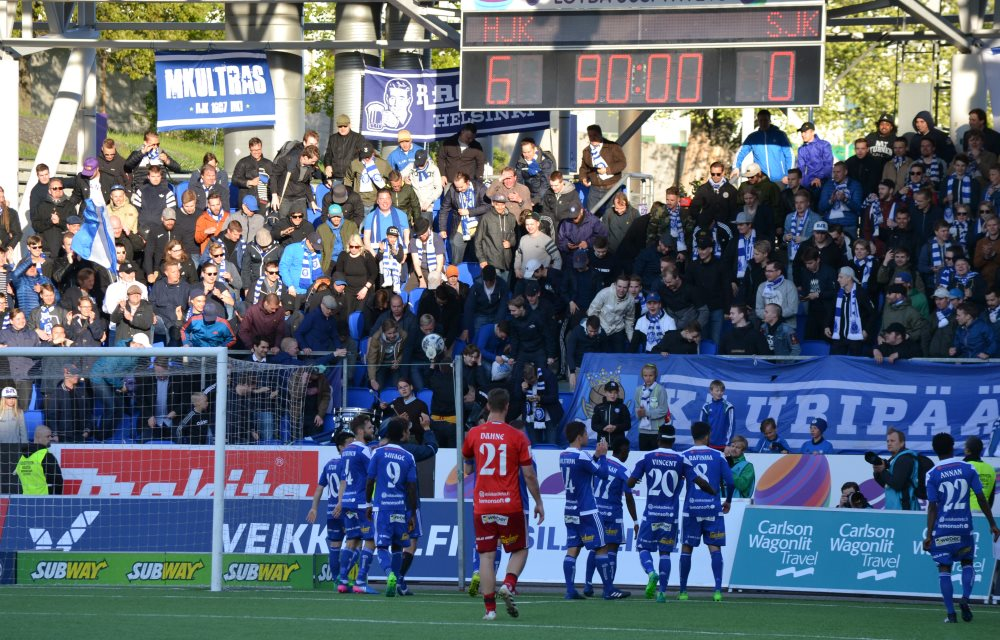
Veikkausliiga match at Bolt Arena in 2017

Season	Winner	Runners-up	Third place
1990	HJK	Kuusysi	MP
1991	Kuusysi	MP	FC Haka
1992	HJK	Kuusysi	FC Jazz
1993	FC Jazz	MyPa	HJK
1994	TPV	MyPa	HJK
1995	FC Haka	MyPa	HJK
1996	FC Jazz	MyPa	TPS
1997	HJK	VPS	FinnPa
1998	FC Haka	VPS	PK-35
1999	FC Haka	HJK	MyPa
2000	FC Haka	FC Jokerit	MyPa
2001	TamU	HJK	MyPa
2002	HJK	MyPa	FC Haka
2003	HJK	FC Haka	TamU
2004	FC Haka	AC Allianssi	TamU
2005	MyPa	HJK	TamU
2006	TamU	HJK	FC Haka
2007	TamU	FC Haka	TPS
2008	FC Inter	FC Honka	FC Lahti
2009	HJK	FC Honka	TPS
2010	HJK	KuPS	TPS
2011	HJK	FC Inter	JJK
2012	HJK	FC Inter	TPS
2013	HJK	FC Honka	VPS
2014	HJK	SJK	FC Lahti
2015	SJK	RoPS	HJK
2016	IFK Mariehamn	HJK	SJK
2017	HJK	KuPS	Ilves
2018	HJK	RoPS	KuPS
2019	KuPS	FC Inter	FC Honka
2020	HJK	FC Inter	KuPS
2021	HJK	KuPS	SJK
2022	HJK	KuPS	FC Honka
2023	HJK	KuPS	VPS
2024	KuPS	Ilves	HJK
2025	KuPS	FC Inter	Ilves
2026	Inter Turku	HJK	KuPS

== Performance ==
=== Performance by club ===
The following clubs have won:

Finnish Championship Cup Competition (1908–1929)
Mestaruussarja (1930–1989)
Veikkausliiga (1990–present)

29 clubs have been Champions.

Club	Titles	Runners-up	Winning years
HJK	33	15	1911, 1912, 1917, 1918, 1919, 1923, 1925, 1936, 1938, 1964, 1973, 1978, 1981, 1985, 1987, 1988, 1990, 1992, 1997, 2002, 2003, 2009, 2010, 2011, 2012, 2013, 2014, 2017, 2018, 2020, 2021, 2022, 2023
FC Haka	9	7	1960, 1962, 1965, 1977, 1995, 1998, 1999, 2000, 2004
HPS	9	6	1921, 1922, 1926, 1927, 1929, 1932, 1934, 1935, 1957
TPS	8	12	1928, 1939, 1941, 1949, 1968, 1971, 1972, 1975
KuPS	8	12	1956, 1958, 1966, 1974, 1976, 2019, 2024, 2025
HIFK	7	7	1930, 1931, 1933, 1937, 1947, 1959, 1961
FC Kuusysi	5	4	1982, 1984, 1986, 1989, 1991
Kiffen	4	–	1913, 1915, 1916, 1955
ÅIFK	3	5	1910, 1920, 1924
Reipas Lahti	3	3	1963, 1967, 1970
VIFK	3	2	1944, 1946, 1953
Tampere United	3	–	2001, 2006, 2007
VPS	2	5	1945, 1948
FC Inter Turku	2	4	2008, 2026
KTP	2	–	1951, 1952
OPS	2	–	1979, 1980
FC Jazz	2	–	1993, 1996
MyPa	1	5	2005
FC Ilves	1	2	1983
SJK	1	1	2015
PUS	1	1	1909
Sudet Vyborg	1	1	1940
KPV	1	1	1969
Unitas	1	–	1908
HT	1	–	1942
Ilves-Kissat	1	–	1950
Pyrkivä Turku	1	–	1954
TPV	1	–	1994
IFK Mariehamn	1	–	2016

== Top scorers ==
Season	Player	Club	Goals
1990	(Poland) Marek Czakon	Ilves	16
1991	(Finland) Kimmo Tarkkio	FC Haka	23
1992	(Brazil) Luiz Antônio Moraes	FC Jazz	21
1993	(Finland) Antti Sumiala	FC Jazz	20
1994	(Brazil) Dionísio	TPV	17
1995	(Russia) Valeri Popovitch	FC Haka	21
1996	(Brazil) Luiz Antônio Moraes	FC Jazz	17
1997	(Brazil) Rafael	HJK	11
1998	(Finland) Matti Hiukka	RoPS	11
1999	(Russia) Valeri Popovitch	FC Haka	23
2000	(Finland) Shefki Kuqi	FC Jokerit	19
2001	(Finland) Paulus Roiha	HJK	22
2002	(Finland) Mika Kottila	HJK	18
2003	(Finland) Saku Puhakainen	MyPa	14
2004	(Finland) Antti Pohja	TamU	16
2005	(Finland) Juho Mäkelä	HJK	16
2006	(Finland) Hermanni Vuorinen	FC Honka	16
2007	(Brazil) Rafael	FC Lahti	14
2008	(Finland) Aleksandr Kokko	FC Honka	13
2008	(Finland) Henri Myntti	TamU	13
2009	(Finland) Hermanni Vuorinen	FC Honka	16
2010	(Finland) Juho Mäkelä	HJK	16
2011	(Finland) Timo Furuholm	FC Inter Turku	22
2012	(Georgia (country)) Irakli Sirbiladze	FC Inter Turku	17
2013	(Finland) Tim Väyrynen	FC Honka	17
2014	(Finland) Jonas Emet	FF Jaro	14
2014	(Argentina) Luis Solignac	IFK Mariehamn	14
2015	(Finland) Aleksandr Kokko	RoPS	17
2016	(Finland) Roope Riski	SJK	17
2017	(Finland) Aleksei Kangaskolkka	IFK Mariehamn	16
2018	(Brazil) Klauss	HJK	21
2019	(Slovenia) Filip Valenčič	FC Inter	16
2020	(Finland) Roope Riski	HJK	16
2021	(Finland) Benjamin Källman	FC Inter	14
2021	(Cameroon) Ariel Ngueukam	SJK	14
2022	(Scotland) Lee Erwin	FC Haka	20
2023	(Serbia) Bojan Radulović	HJK	18
2024	(England) Ashley Coffey	AC Oulu	12
2024	(Nicaragua) Jaime Moreno	SJK	12
2025	(Finland) Kasper Paananen	SJK	18

== Individual all-time records ==
Players still active are highlighted

=== Most matches played ===
Player	Time	Matches
(Finland) Toni Huttunen	1992–2009	441
(Finland) Mikko Hauhia	2003–2019	416
(Finland) Ari Nyman	2000–2018	406
(Russia) Valeri Popovitch	1993–2009	395
(Finland) Saku Puhakainen	1995–2009	382
(Finland) Tommi Kautonen	1990–2006	376
(Finland) Juuso Kangaskorpi	1993–2008	373
(Finland) Tuomas Aho	1999–2017	371
(Finland) Aleksi Paananen	2010–present	363
(Russia) Alexei Eremenko	1991–2005	360
(Finland) Aarno Turpeinen	1990–2004	358
(Brazil) Rafael	1997–2016	358
(Finland) Henri Lehtonen	2000–2017	358
(Finland) Vesa Rantanen	1991–2004	354
(Finland) Tero Taipale	1997–2014	352
(Finland) Rami Nieminen	1991–2004	347
(Finland) Petteri Pennanen	2008–present	346
(Finland) Magnus Bahne	1998–2015	326

Last updated: 4 January 2026.
Source: Veikkausliiga.com.

=== Most goals scored ===
Player	Time	Goals	Matches	Average
(Russia) Valeri Popovitch	1993–2009	166	395	0.42
(Brazil) Rafael	1997–2016	136	358	0.38
(Finland) Saku Puhakainen	1995–2009	114	382	0.30
(Finland) Juho Mäkelä	2003–2018	111	288	0.39
(Finland) Roope Riski	2010–present	95	221	0.43
(Brazil) Luiz Antônio	1992–2003	94	196	0.48
(Finland) Antti Pohja	1994–2009	87	302	0.29
(Finland) Timo Furuholm	2003–2021	85	230	0.37
(Finland) Jari Vanhala	1991–1999	85	236	0.36
(Finland) Ismo Lius	1991–1999	84	176	0.48
(Finland) Akseli Pelvas	2007–2020	80	233	0.34
(The Gambia) Demba Savage	2008–2021	80	280	0.29
(Finland) Kimmo Tarkkio	1990–1999	79	178	0.44
(Cameroon) Ariel Ngueukam	2012–2023	77	249	0.31
(Finland) Juha Karvinen	1990–2000	77	255	0.30
(Finland) Ilja Venäläinen	2001–2013	76	304	0.25
(Finland) Aleksei Kangaskolkka	2004–2018	76	246	0.31
(Finland) Tim Väyrynen	2010–present	75	195	0.38

Last updated: 4 January 2026.
Source: Veikkausliiga.com.

== Referees ==
The referee committee of Football Association of Finland named ten referees available primarily for Veikkausliiga matches for the 2024 season (Category 1). Currently there are four FIFA-certified international referees in Veikkausliiga. Additionally, there are some other referees, certified by Finnish FA, available for Veikkausliiga matches (Category 2).

As of 2024, there has not been a female referee named in the Veikkausliiga match. On 8 July 2023, Heini Hyvönen made history as she was the first female assistant referee in the league, in a match between HJK – FC Lahti.

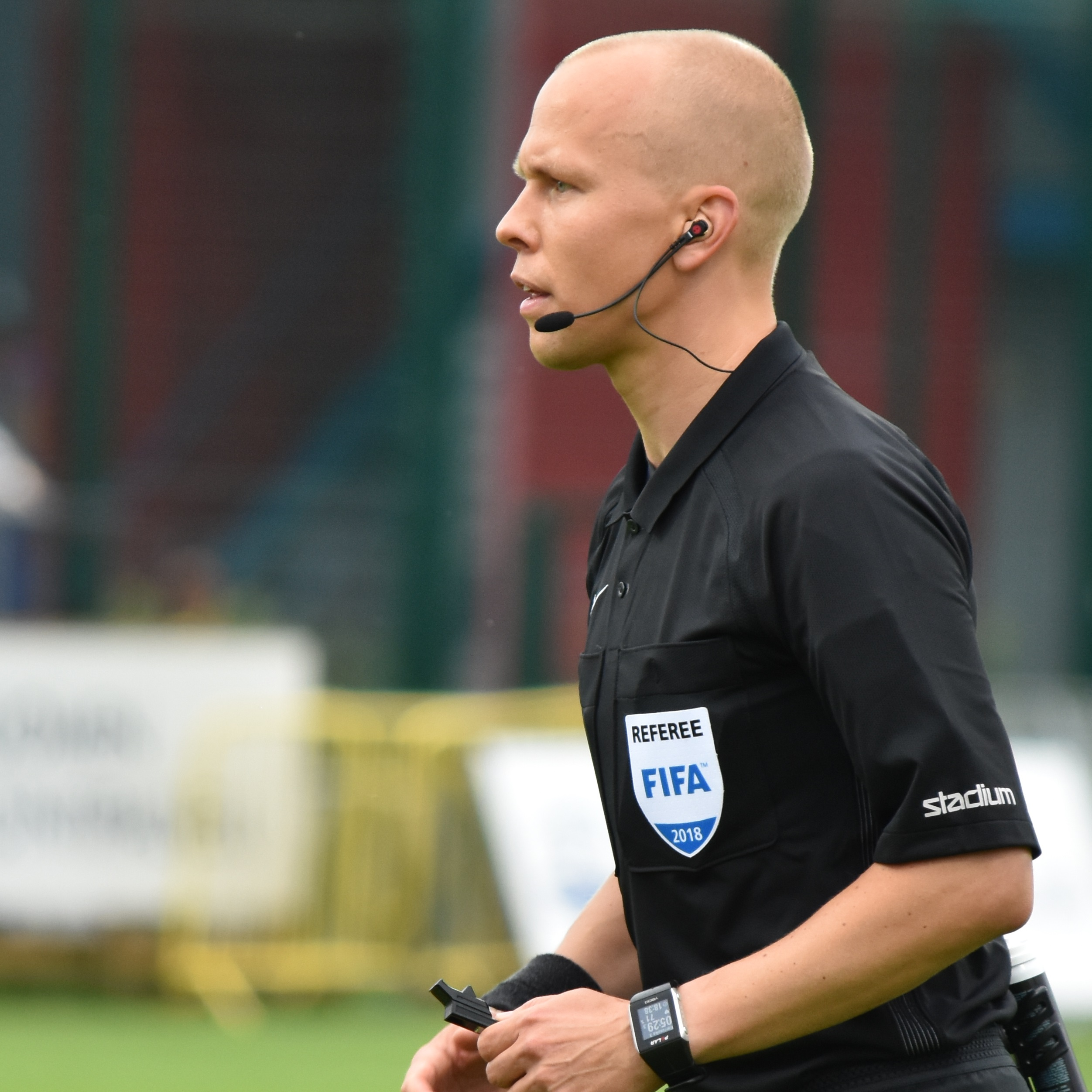
Antti Munukka has the most refereed Veikkausliiga matches

=== FIFA certified referees ===
- Mohammad Al-Emara
- Joni Hyytiä
- Oliver Reitala
- Peiman Simani

=== Referee statistics ===
After the 2023 season.

	Referee	Seasons	Matches
1.	Antti Munukka	2007–present	286
2.	Petteri Kari	1997–2016	284
3.	Mattias Gestranius	2006–2022	244
4.	Dennis Antamo	2010–present	241
5.	Mikko Vuorela	1994–2008	220
6.	Jouni Hyytiä	1996–2012	237
7.	Ville Nevalainen	2011–present	215
8.	Tony Asumaa	1998–2012	188
9.	Jari Järvinen	2010–2022	208
10.	Tero Nieminen	2003–2015	169

== See also ==
- Football Association of Finland
- List of foreign Veikkausliiga players
