= 1937 Mestaruussarja – Finnish League Championship =

Mestaruussarja
- Season: 1937
- Champions: HIFK Helsinki
- Relegated: VIFK Vaasa; UL Turku
- Top goalscorer: Aatos Lehtonen, HJK Helsinki (25)

The 1937 season was the eighth completed season of Finnish Football League Championship, known as the Mestaruussarja.

== Overview ==
The 1937 Mestaruussarja was contested by 8 teams, with HIFK Helsinki winning the championship. VIFK Vaasa and UL Turku were relegated to the second tier which was known as the Suomensarja.

== League table ==
Pos	Team	Pld	W	D	L	GF	GA	GD	Pts
1	HIFK Helsinki (C)	14	8	5	1	48	16	+32	21
2	HJK Helsinki	14	8	4	2	58	24	+34	20
3	Sudet Viipuri	14	5	6	3	33	27	+6	16
4	HPS Helsinki	14	5	5	4	30	25	+5	15
5	HT Helsinki	14	6	3	5	30	34	−4	15
6	TPS Turku	14	5	4	5	32	35	−3	14
7	VIFK Vaasa (R)	14	2	4	8	22	49	−27	8
8	UL Turku (R)	14	1	1	12	12	55	−43	3

(C) Champions; (R) Relegated

== Results ==
Home \ Away	HFK	HJK	HPS	HT	SUD	TPS	UL	VFK
HIFK		3–4	2–2	5–0	1–1	4–0	9–0	6–0
HJK	1–3		2–2	3–4	5–1	2–2	2–0	10–1
HPS	2–2	1–7		1–3	1–1	1–1	4–0	1–2
HT	2–2	2–5	3–2		1–2	2–2	3–2	4–2
Sudet	3–3	2–2	0–2	5–1		5–4	8–1	0–0
TPS	1–4	2–2	1–3	0–3	3–1		3–0	5–2
UL	0–2	0–6	0–4	2–1	1–2	3–4		2–2
VIFK	0–2	1–7	1–4	1–1	2–2	3–4	5–1	

Legend: Blue = home team win; Yellow = draw; Red = away team win.

== See also ==
- 1937 Suomensarja (Tier 2)
