= 1935 Mestaruussarja – Finnish League Championship =

Mestaruussarja
- Season: 1935
- Champions: HPS Helsinki
- Relegated: VIFK Vaasa; ÅIFK Turku
- Top goalscorer: Aatos Lehtonen, HJK Helsinki; Nuutti Lintamo, Vaasan Palloseura (13)

The 1935 season was the sixth completed season of Finnish Football League Championship, known as the Mestaruussarja.

== Overview ==
The 1935 Mestaruussarja was contested by 8 teams, with HPS Helsinki winning the championship which was also known as the A-sarja. VIFK Vaasa and ÅIFK Turku were relegated to the second tier which became known in 1936 as Suomensarja.

== League table ==
Pos	Team	Pld	W	D	L	GF	GA	GD	Pts
1	HPS Helsinki (C)	14	11	0	3	38	15	+23	22
2	HIFK Helsinki	14	8	1	5	41	28	+13	17
3	HT Helsinki	14	7	1	6	28	26	+2	15
4	HJK Helsinki	14	6	2	6	32	26	+6	14
5	VPS Vaasa	14	6	2	6	27	27	0	14
6	Sudet Viipuri	14	7	0	7	31	34	−3	14
7	VIFK Vaasa (R)	14	3	3	8	29	37	−8	9
8	ÅIFK Turku (R)	14	3	1	10	12	45	−33	7

(C) Champions; (R) Relegated

== Results ==
Home \ Away	HFK	HJK	HPS	HT	SUD	VIF	VPS	ÅIF
HIFK		1–0	0–4	1–2	4–2	4–3	4–0	7–0
HJK	4–5		0–1	2–3	2–1	4–2	2–2	6–1
HPS	4–1	1–3		1–2	4–0	3–1	5–1	1–0
HT	4–0	2–4	2–3		2–3	1–3	2–0	2–3
Sudet	0–7	1–3	1–4	1–2		4–2	4–2	3–0
VIFK	1–5	2–2	2–3	2–2	0–2		1–1	7–3
VPS	3–1	3–0	1–0	3–0	1–5	2–3		5–0
ÅIFK	1–1	1–0	1–4	0–2	1–4	1–0	0–3	

Legend: Blue = home team win; Yellow = draw; Red = away team win.
