= 1938 Mestaruussarja – Finnish League Championship =

Mestaruussarja
- Season: 1938
- Champions: HJK Helsinki
- Relegated: Sudet Viipuri
- Top goalscorer: Aatos Lehtonen, HJK Helsinki (14)

The 1938 season was the ninth completed season of Finnish Football League Championship, known as the Mestaruussarja.

== Overview ==
The 1938 Mestaruussarja was contested by 8 teams, with HJK Helsinki winning the championship. Sudet Viipuri were relegated to the second tier which was known as the Suomensarja.

== League table ==
Pos	Team	Pld	W	D	L	GF	GA	GD	Pts
1	HJK Helsinki (C)	14	8	4	2	43	24	+19	20
2	TPS Turku	14	7	2	5	37	25	+12	16
3	VPS Vaasa	14	7	2	5	30	22	+8	16
4	HT Helsinki	14	7	2	5	28	28	0	16
5	HPS Helsinki	14	6	2	6	22	33	−11	14
6	HIFK Helsinki	14	4	3	7	27	31	−4	11
7	KPT Kuopio (O)	14	4	3	7	21	41	−20	11
8	Sudet Viipuri (R)	14	4	0	10	26	30	−4	8

(C) Champions; (O) Play-off winners; (R) Relegated

== Results ==
Home \ Away	HFK	HJK	HPS	HT	KPT	SUD	TPS	VPS
HIFK		3–5	2–3	3–4	0–1	4–2	2–2	1–2
HJK	4–1		2–3	4–1	2–2	4–0	4–4	1–1
HPS	1–0	1–4		1–2	4–2	0–5	1–0	3–0
HT	0–2	2–2	2–2		2–1	4–3	2–1	3–1
KPT	1–1	1–5	2–2	3–2		3–1	1–5	3–1
Sudet	1–2	3–0	3–1	0–3	7–0		0–3	0–3
TPS	3–4	0–3	7–0	2–0	3–1	2–1		4–2
VPS	2–2	2–3	2–0	3–1	6–0	1–0	4–1	

Legend: Blue = home team win; Yellow = draw; Red = away team win.

== See also ==
- 1938 Suomensarja (Tier 2)
