= 1939 Mestaruussarja – Finnish League Championship =

Mestaruussarja
- Season: 1939
- Champions: TPS Turku
- Relegated: KPT Kuopio; Viipurin Reipas
- Top goalscorer: Aatos Lehtonen, HJK Helsinki (15)

The 1939 season was the tenth completed season of Finnish Football League Championship, known as the Mestaruussarja.

== Overview ==
The 1939 Mestaruussarja was contested by 8 teams, with TPS Turku winning the championship. KPT Kuopio and Viipurin Reipas were relegated to the second tier which was known as the Suomensarja.

== League table ==
Pos	Team	Pld	W	D	L	GF	GA	GD	Pts
1	TPS Turku (C)	12	9	2	1	38	17	+21	20
2	HJK Helsinki	13	7	4	2	40	18	+22	18
3	HT Helsinki	12	6	1	5	27	21	+6	13
4	HIFK Helsinki	13	5	3	5	31	32	−1	13
5	HPS Helsinki	13	5	3	5	20	22	−2	13
6	VPS Vaasa	12	3	4	5	20	21	−1	10
7	KPT Kuopio (R)	12	2	3	7	17	29	−12	7
8	Viipurin Reipas (R)	11	2	0	9	18	51	−33	4

Source: rsssf.com
(C) Champions; (R) Relegated

The league was abandoned due to the Winter War (14 rounds having been scheduled). The above table was declared final.

== Results ==
Home \ Away	HFK	HJK	HPS	HT	KPT	REI	TPS	VPS
HIFK		1–5	3–0	2–5		6–2	1–5	1–0
HJK	3–3		1–1	5–0	1–0	7–3	3–4	3–0
HPS	0–0	3–1		1–3	3–3	3–2	5–1	
HT	2–3	0–1	0–1		8–0		1–1	2–1
KPT	2–1	2–2	0–1			5–1	0–3	1–1
Reipas	3–8	0–7	2–0	2–3	2–1			
TPS	3–0		2–0	4–1	4–2	6–0		3–2
VPS	2–2	1–1	4–2	0–2	2–1	5–1	2–2	

Legend: Blue = home team win; Yellow = draw; Red = away team win.
