= Kimmo Lipponen =

Finnish former footballer (born 1962)

Personal information
- Date of birth: 9 December 1962 (age 63)
- Place of birth: Sipoo, Finland
- Height: 1.73 m (5 ft 8 in)
- Position: Midfielder

Youth career
- TPS

Senior career*
Years	Team	Apps	(Gls)
1980–1985	TPS	131	(36)
1986–1987	Ilves	42	(5)
1988	TPS	26	(4)
1989	First Vienna	14	(1)
1990–1991	TPS	40	(1)
1991	LTU		
1992	Ponteva Turku		
1993	TPS	28	(1)
1994	Oxelösund		
1995–1996	Kupittaan Allianssi	24	(18)
1996	VPS	9	(0)
1997	Kupittan Allianssi	18	(5)
1998	VPS	25	(2)
2000	SalPa	1	(0)
2001	Åbo IFK	6	(2)

International career
1979–1980	Finland U17	7	(3)
1981	Finland U18	4	(0)
1981–1983	Finland U21	12	(1)
1983–1984	Finland	6	(0)

Managerial career
- 1999: VPS (assistant)
- 1999: VPS
- 2000–2001: SalPa
- 2004–2006: Finland U21 (assistant)
- 2012: Finland U18
- 2014–2015: Finland U16
- 2016–2017: Finland U17
- 2017–2018: Finland U19
- * Club domestic league appearances and goals

Kimmo Lipponen (born 9 December 1962) is a Finnish football coach and a former professional footballer who played as a midfielder. He was capped six times for the Finland national team between 1983 and 1984. Lipponen made 301 appearances in Finnish top-tiers Mestaruussarja and Veikkausliiga, scoring 49 goals. He spent the majority of his career with his former youth club TPS. Besides in his native Finland, Lipponen played for First Vienna in Austrian Bundesliga and Oxelösund in Sweden.

After his playing career, Lipponen worked as a coach. In 1999, he briefly served as the manager of VPS in Veikkausliiga after the dismissal of Sören Cratz. Later he has worked for the Football Association of Finland and coached various Finnish youth national teams.

His brother Mika Lipponen is also a former Finnish international footballer.
