= 1932 Mestaruussarja – Finnish League Championship =

Mestaruussarja
- Season: 1932
- Champions: HPS Helsinki (6th Finnish title)
- Relegated: Toverit Helsinki; KIF Helsinki
- Top goalscorer: Lauri Lehtinen (13)

The 1932 season was the third completed season of Finnish Football League Championship, known as the Mestaruussarja.

== Overview ==
The 1932 Mestaruussarja was contested by 8 teams, with HPS Helsinki winning the championship which was also known as the A-sarja [‘A-series’]. Toverit Helsinki and KIF Helsinki were relegated to the second tier which was known as the B-sarja [‘B-series’].

== Participating clubs ==
Location of teams in 1931 Mestaruussarja

In 1932, there were 8 participants in the Mestaruussarja:

- HIFK Helsinki
- HPS Helsinki
- KIF Helsinki
- Toverit Helsinki — Promoted from B-sarja
- Sudet Viipuri
- VPS Vaasa
- TPS Turku
- ÅIFK Turku — Promoted from B-sarja

== League table ==
Pos	Team	Pld	W	D	L	GF	GA	GD	Pts
1	HPS Helsinki (C)	14	8	4	2	49	26	+23	20
2	VPS Vaasa	14	8	3	3	51	35	+16	19
3	HIFK Helsinki	14	7	3	4	44	26	+18	17
4	TPS Turku	14	6	3	5	37	29	+8	15
5	Sudet Viipuri	14	6	1	7	32	36	−4	13
6	ÅIFK Turku	14	5	0	9	20	45	−25	10
7	Toverit Helsinki (R)	14	4	1	9	27	44	−17	9
8	KIF Helsinki (R)	14	4	1	9	22	41	−19	9

(C) Champions; (R) Relegated

== Results ==
Home \ Away	HFK	HPS	HT	KIF	SUD	TPS	VPS	ÅIF
HIFK		5–0	6–2	1–2	3–1	5–0	2–3	1–4
HPS	4–4		4–1	2–2	3–2	5–1	9–1	1–3
HT	1–3	1–1		3–2	6–2	0–3	4–0	2–3
KIF	2–4	0–4	0–2		6–1	2–1	0–9	2–0
Sudet	2–1	0–3	5–1	4–0		1–1	5–3	8–2
TPS	2–2	2–4	4–2	4–0	3–0		3–3	8–0
VPS	3–3	3–3	8–1	4–3	4–0	5–0		2–0
ÅIFK	0–4	1–6	3–1	2–1	0–1	0–5	2–3	

Legend: Blue = home team win; Yellow = draw; Red = away team win.
