= 1942 Mestaruussarja – Finnish League Competition =

Mestaruussarja
- Season: 1942
- Champions: HT Helsinki

The 1942 season was the 13th completed season of Finnish Football League Championship but was played as cup competition.

== Overview ==
The 1942 Mestaruussarja could not be played and a cup competition was held instead. Not even a cup competition was arranged in 1943.

== Semi-finals ==
Tie no	Team 1	Score	Team 2
1	VPS Vaasa	1–4	HT Helsinki
2	Sudet Viipuri	w/o	HJK Helsinki

== Championship final ==
Tie no	Team 1	Score	Team 2
1	HT Helsinki	6–4	Sudet Viipuri
