= 1934 Mestaruussarja – Finnish League Championship =

Mestaruussarja
- Season: 1934
- Champions: HPS Helsinki
- Relegated: TPS Turku; UL Turku
- Top goalscorer: Olof Strömsten, HIFK Helsinki (15)

The 1934 season was the fifth completed season of Finnish Football League Championship, known as the Mestaruussarja.

== Overview ==
The 1934 Mestaruussarja was contested by 8 teams, with HPS Helsinki winning the championship which was also known as the A-sarja. TPS Turku and UL Turku were relegated to the second tier which was known as the B-sarja.

== League table ==
Pos	Team	Pld	W	D	L	GF	GA	GD	Pts
1	HPS Helsinki (C)	14	10	4	0	40	9	+31	24
2	HIFK Helsinki	14	11	1	2	53	21	+32	23
3	HT Helsinki	14	6	3	5	27	19	+8	15
4	Sudet Viipuri	14	6	3	5	25	25	0	15
5	HJK Helsinki	14	5	4	5	23	18	+5	14
6	ÅIFK Turku	14	4	3	7	20	41	−21	11
7	TPS Turku (R)	14	4	2	8	32	49	−17	10
8	UL Turku (R)	14	0	0	14	9	47	−38	0

(C) Champions; (R) Relegated

== Results ==
Home \ Away	HFK	HJK	HPS	HT	SUD	TPS	UL	ÅIF
HIFK		2–0	2–5	1–0	5–1	6–2	12–1	4–0
HJK	0–3		0–1	1–1	0–2	6–2	2–1	1–1
HPS	2–2	1–1		1–0	3–1	7–0	2–1	7–0
HT	4–1	1–0	1–1		5–1	2–3	1–0	3–5
Sudet	1–4	1–1	1–1	0–0		4–1	4–1	3–0
TPS	4–7	0–2	0–3	4–2	1–3		4–2	2–2
UL	0–1	1–5	0–3	0–1	1–2	0–6		1–2
ÅIFK	1–3	1–4	0–3	1–6	2–1	3–3	2–0	

Legend: Blue = home team win; Yellow = draw; Red = away team win.
