= 1941 Mestaruussarja – Finnish League Championship =

Mestaruussarja
- Season: 1941
- Champions: TPS Turku
- Relegated: HT Helsinki; HPS Helsinki
- Top goalscorer: Jussi Valtonen (14)

The 1941 season was the 12th completed season of Finnish Football League Championship, known as the Mestaruussarja.

== Overview ==
The 1941 Mestaruussarja was contested by 8 teams, with TPS Turku winning the championship. HT Helsinki and HPS Helsinki were relegated to the second tier which was known as the Suomensarja.

== League table ==
Pos	Team	Pld	W	D	L	GF	GA	GD	Pts
1	TPS Turku (C)	13	10	1	2	52	16	+36	21
2	VPS Vaasa	13	8	3	2	32	17	+15	19
3	Sudet Viipuri	14	7	3	4	38	30	+8	17
4	HIFK Helsinki	13	7	2	4	35	27	+8	16
5	HJK Helsinki	12	4	2	6	22	30	−8	10
6	KIF Helsinki	13	3	2	8	26	51	−25	8
7	HT Helsinki (R)	13	3	2	8	19	32	−13	8
8	HPS Helsinki (R)	13	1	3	9	18	39	−21	5

Source: rsssf.com
(C) Champions; (R) Relegated

The league was abandoned due to World War II (14 rounds having been scheduled). The above table was declared final.

Sudet Viipuri played their home matches in Helsinki.

== Results ==
Home \ Away	HFK	HJK	HPS	HT	KIF	SUD	TPS	VPS
HIFK		4–2	1–3		4–1	3–2	2–2	0–3
HJK	3–2		3–3	4–2	4–1	1–2	0–3	0–2
HPS	2–4	2–3		0–1	0–1	1–4		1–4
HT	2–5	3–0	3–3		2–2	1–2	2–6	1–0
KIF	5–2		3–3	1–0		2–4	2–8	3–4
Sudet	0–4	1–1	6–0	3–0	7–4		2–5	3–3
TPS	1–3	5–1	5–0	1–0	9–1	3–0		4–0
VPS	1–1		1–0	5–2	4–0	2–2	3–0	

Legend: Blue = home team win; Yellow = draw; Red = away team win.
