= 1938 Suomensarja – Finnish League Division 2 =

Suomensarja
- Season: 1938
- Champions: Reipas Viipuri; SP Sortavala; KIF Helsinki; Drott Pietarsaari
- Promoted: Reipas Viipuri
- Relegated: JoPS Joensuu; YVP Hyvinkää

These are statistics for the first season of the Suomensarja held in 1938.

== Overview ==
The 1938 Suomensarja was contested by 26 teams divided into 4 regional sections. The top teams from each section then participated in a promotion play-offs with Reipas Viipuri eventually gaining promotion andfinishing as champions.

== League tables ==
=== Itäsarja, Eteläinen lohko (Eastern League, Southern Section) ===
Pos	Team	Pld	W	D	L	GF	GA	GD	Pts
1	Reipas Viipuri (Q)	12	9	0	3	46	14	+32	18
2	Ilves Viipuri	12	6	3	3	32	20	+12	15
3	ViPS Viipuri	10	4	3	3	33	33	0	11
4	YVPS Imatra	12	4	4	4	27	22	+5	12
5	KUP Kouvola	12	3	5	4	23	33	−10	11
6	SiU Simpele	12	4	2	6	32	31	+1	10
7	KoPS Kotka	12	2	0	10	16	56	−40	4

(Q) Qualified for the phase indicated

=== Itäsarja, Pohjoinen lohko (Eastern League, Northern Section) ===
Pos	Team	Pld	W	D	L	GF	GA	GD	Pts
1	SP Sortavala (Q)	8	4	3	1	19	8	+11	11
2	WP-35 Varkaus	8	5	0	3	24	8	+16	10
3	KuPS Kuopio	8	4	2	2	20	11	+9	10
4	SoPS Sortavala	8	3	2	3	12	14	−2	8
5	JoPS Joensuu (R)	8	0	1	7	8	42	−34	1

(Q) Qualified for the phase indicated; (R) Relegated

=== Länsisarja, Eteläinen lohko (Western League, Southern Section) ===
Pos	Team	Pld	W	D	L	GF	GA	GD	Pts
1	KIF Helsinki (Q)	12	9	1	2	49	12	+37	19
2	ÅIFK Turku	12	9	0	3	52	19	+33	18
3	Akilles Porvoo	12	7	0	5	27	29	−2	14
4	UL Turku	12	5	2	5	25	26	−1	12
5	HBK Hanko	12	5	2	5	21	24	−3	12
6	EIF Tammisaari	12	4	0	8	18	40	−22	8
7	YVP Hyvinkää (R)	12	0	1	11	15	57	−42	1

(Q) Qualified for the phase indicated; (R) Relegated

=== Länsisarja, Pohjoinen lohko (Western League, Northern Section) ===
Pos	Team	Pld	W	D	L	GF	GA	GD	Pts
1	Drott Pietarsaari (Q)	12	9	2	1	45	19	+26	20
2	VIFK Vaasa	12	8	1	3	48	22	+26	17
3	GBK Kokkola	12	7	0	5	31	26	+5	14
4	TaPa Tampere	12	5	3	4	28	24	+4	13
5	Iirot Rauma	12	3	4	5	30	30	0	10
6	Haka Valkeakoski	12	4	1	7	29	52	−23	9
7	PoPa Pori	12	0	1	11	15	53	−38	1

(Q) Qualified for the phase indicated

=== Nousukarsinnat (Promotion Playoffs) ===
==== Semi-finals ====
Tie no	Team 1	Score	Team 2
1	Reipas Viipuri	10–0	SP Sortavala
2	SP Sortavala	1–3	Reipas Viipuri

Tie no	Team 1	Score	Team 2
1	KIF Helsinki	4–1	Drott Pietarsaari
2	Drott Pietarsaari	1–2	KIF Helsinki

==== Finals ====
Tie no	Team 1	Score	Team 2
1	Reipas Viipuri	3–2	KIF Helsinki
2	KIF Helsinki	1–2	Reipas Viipuri

Reipas Viipuri were promoted and KIF Helsinki were required to undertake a further round of playoffs.

=== Mestaruussarja/Suomensarja promotion/relegation playoffs ===
Tie no	Team 1	Score	Team 2
1	KPT Kuopio	4–2	KIF Helsinki
2	KIF Helsinki	2–3	KPT Kuopio

KIF Helsinki remained in the Suomensarja and KPT Kuopio were not relegated from the Mestaruussarja.

== See also ==
- Mestaruussarja (Tier 1)
