= 1937 Suomensarja – Finnish League Division 2 =

Suomensarja
- Season: 1937
- Champions: KPT Kuopio
- Promoted: KPT Kuopio; VPS Vaasa

These are statistics for the first season of the Suomensarja held in 1937.

== Overview ==
The 1937 Suomensarja was contested by 13 teams divided into 2 regional sections. The top teams from each section then participated in a promotion play-offs with KPT Kuopio and VPS Vaasa eventually gaining promotion with the former finishing as champions.

== League tables ==
=== Itäsarja (Eastern League) ===
Pos	Team	Pld	W	D	L	GF	GA	GD	Pts
1	KPT Kuopio (Q)	10	9	1	0	40	17	+23	19
2	Reipas Viipuri	10	5	1	4	25	19	+6	11
3	KuPS Kuopio	10	4	3	3	13	12	+1	11
4	ViPS Viipuri	10	3	2	5	22	18	+4	8
5	KUP Kouvola	10	2	2	6	15	31	−16	6
6	KoPS Kotka	10	2	1	7	14	42	−28	5

(Q) Qualified for the phase indicated

=== Länsisarja (Western League) ===
Pos	Team	Pld	W	D	L	GF	GA	GD	Pts
1	VPS Vaasa (Q)	12	11	1	0	58	5	+53	23
2	Drott Pietarsaari	12	7	1	4	36	25	+11	15
3	KIF Helsinki	12	5	1	6	26	30	−4	11
4	Akilles Porvoo	12	5	0	7	23	30	−7	10
5	TaPa Tampere	12	5	0	7	19	29	−10	10
6	HBK Hanko	12	4	1	7	21	38	−17	9
7	PoPa Pori	12	3	0	9	18	44	−26	6

(Q) Qualified for the phase indicated

=== Nousukarsinnat (Promotion Playoffs) ===
Tie no	Team 1	Score	Team 2
1	KPT Kuopio	2–2	VPS Vaasa
2	VPS Vaasa	0–3	KPT Kuopio

KPT Kuopio were promoted and VPS Vaasa were required to undertake a further round of playoffs.

=== Mestaruussarja/Suomensarja promotion/relegation playoffs ===
Tie no	Team 1	Score	Team 2
1	VPS Vaasa	2–2	VPS Vaasa
2	VIFK Vaasa	0–3	VPS Vaasa

VPS Vaasa were promoted to the Mestaruussarja and VIFK Vaasa relegated.

== See also ==
- Mestaruussarja (Tier 1)
