= 1958 Mestaruussarja =

Mestaruussarja
- Season: 1958
- Champions: KuPS Kuopio
- Relegated: IKissat Tampere; VPS Vaasa; KTP Kotka

The 1958 season was the 28th completed season of Finnish Football League Championship, known as the Mestaruussarja.

== Overview ==
The Mestaruussarja was administered by the Finnish Football Association and the competition's 1958 season was contested by 10 teams.

After the series had been completed, KuPS Kuopio and HPS Helsinki were tied with each having 26 points. These two teams then faced each other in a match that decided the championship. KuPS won the match and the championship 1–0 after extra time and earned a place in the 1959–60 European Cup preliminary round (although they subsequently withdrew).

VPS Vaasa and KTP Kotka, were relegated to the Suomensarja on the basis of the final table, while the third team to be relegated was decided in a replay between Haka Valkeakoski and IKissat Tampere Haka won 4–1 and remained in the Mestaruussarja, while IKissat was relegated.

== League standings ==
Pos	Team	Pld	W	D	L	GF	GA	GD	Pts
1	KuPS Kuopio (C, Q)	18	13	0	5	40	22	+18	26
2	HPS Helsinki (Q)	18	11	4	3	38	26	+12	26
3	HIFK Helsinki	18	10	1	7	36	32	+4	21
4	TPS Turku	18	9	2	7	47	34	+13	20
5	HJK Helsinki	18	9	2	7	45	34	+11	20
6	VIFK Vaasa	18	7	3	8	36	35	+1	17
7	Haka Valkeakoski (Q)	18	6	4	8	28	27	+1	16
8	IKissat Tampere (Q, R)	18	7	2	9	33	41	−8	16
9	VPS Vaasa (R)	18	3	4	11	24	48	−24	10
10	KTP Kotka (R)	18	3	2	13	27	55	−28	8

(C) Champions; (Q) Qualified for the phase indicated; (R) Relegated

== Results ==
Home \ Away	HAK	HFK	HJK	HPS	IK	KTP	KPS	TPS	VIF	VPS
FC Haka		0–1	4–1	2–2	2–0	3–1	1–0	2–0	0–0	4–0
HIFK	3–0		0–3	0–2	3–1	0–3	2–3	4–2	2–4	0–1
HJK	1–1	1–3		1–2	2–1	6–2	1–4	5–2	2–2	4–1
HPS	3–2	2–3	3–2		4–1	4–1	1–0	2–1	1–0	3–3
IKissat	3–1	3–3	4–2	0–0		3–2	0–1	1–5	4–1	5–1
KTP	1–0	2–5	0–2	2–3	2–4		0–2	1–3	3–1	2–2
KuPS	2–0	0–2	2–0	4–1	2–1	4–1		3–2	3–2	6–1
TPS	3–3	2–0	0–2	2–2	1–2	8–2	4–1		5–2	2–1
VIFK	2–1	2–3	1–6	1–0	6–0	4–1	1–0	2–3		4–0
VPS	4–2	1–2	2–4	1–3	3–0	1–1	2–3	0–2	1–1	

Legend: Blue = home team win; Yellow = draw; Red = away team win.
