= Kouvolan keskuskenttä =

Stadium in Kouvola, Finland

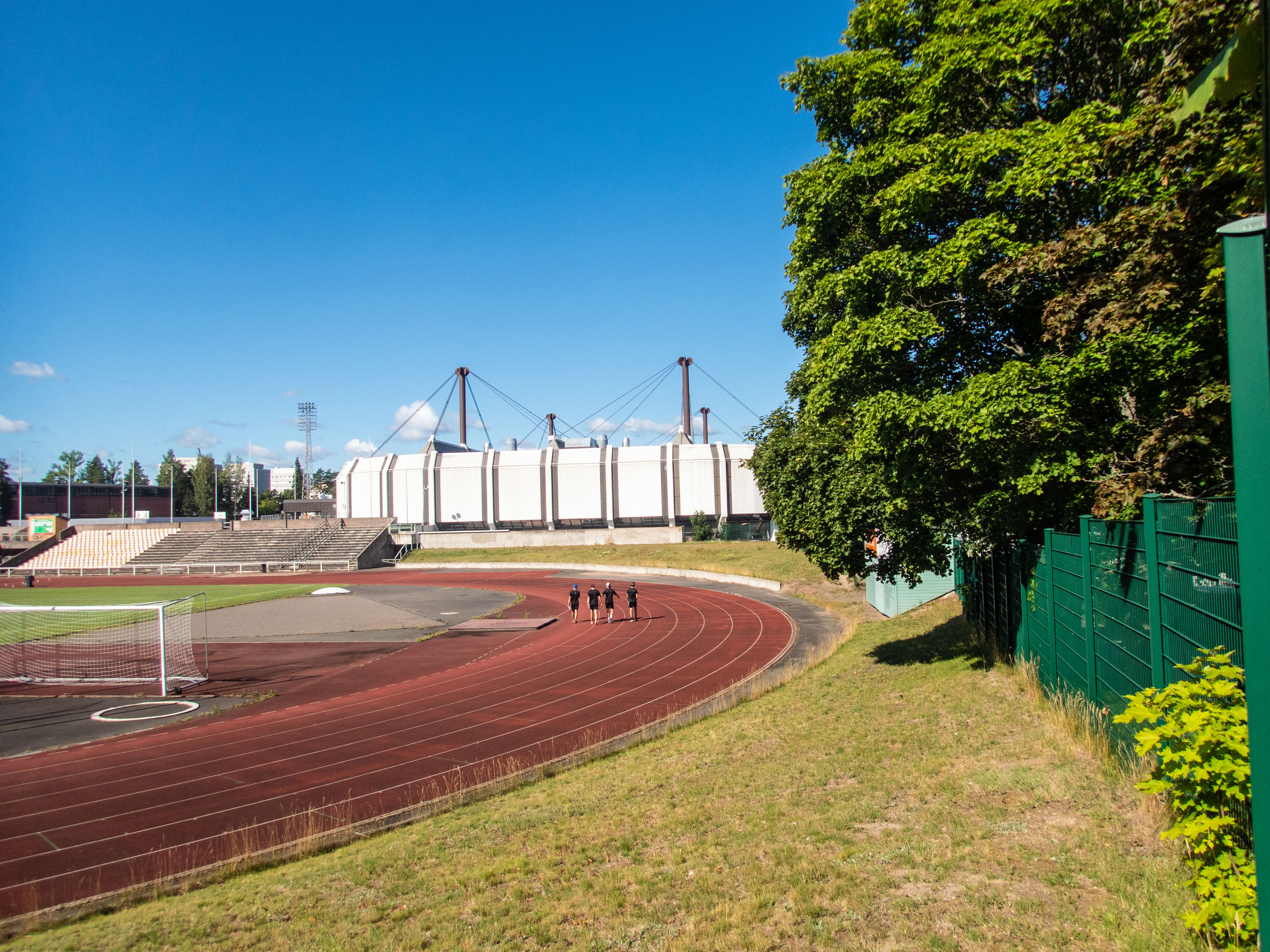
- Kouvolan keskusurheilukenttä in 2023

- Location within Finland
- Full name: Keskusurheilukenttä
- Address: Kouvola; Finland
- Coordinates: 60°52′19″N 26°42′48″E
- Capacity: 12,000
- Type: Stadium
- Surface: Grass
- Field size: 110 × 72 m
- Field shape: Rectangular

Tenant
- Sudet

Keskusurheilukenttä is a multi-use stadium in Kouvola, Finland. It is used mostly for football matches and is the home stadium of the bandy club Kouvolan Sudet (Wolves). The stadium has a capacity of 12,000 spectators.
