= 1945 Mestaruussarja =

Mestaruussarja
- Season: 1945

The 1945 season was the 15th completed season of Finnish Football League Championship, which was played in two groups followed by a knock-out phase.

== Championship play-off ==
=== Semi-finals ===
- HPS Helsinki 5–2 HJK Helsinki
- TPS Turku 4–5 VPS Vaasa

=== Final ===
- VPS Vaasa 2–0 HPS Helsinki
