= Rafael (footballer, born 1978) =

Brazilian footballer

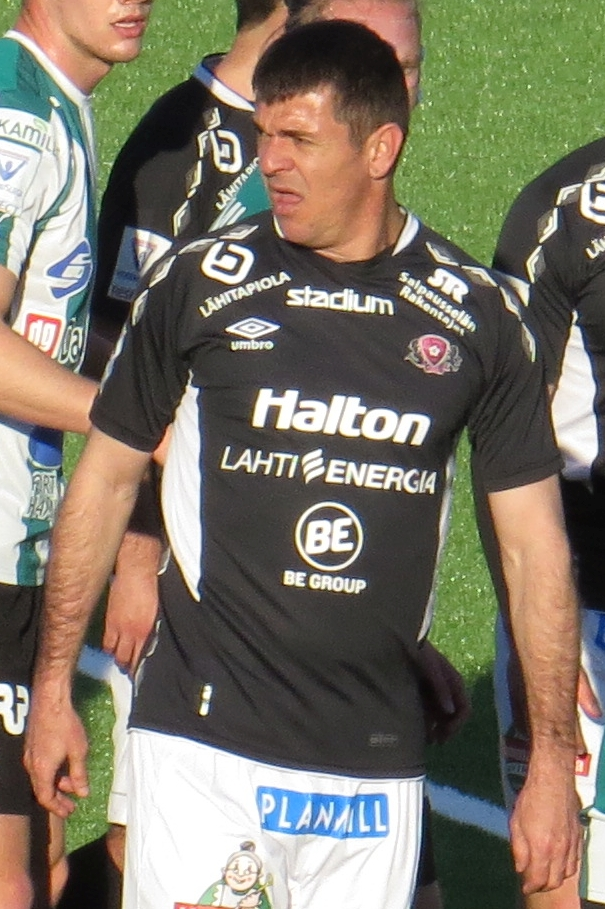
- Vieira in 2015.

Personal information
- Full name: Rafael Pires Vieira
- Date of birth: 1 August 1978 (age 48)
- Place of birth: Criciúma, Brazil
- Height: 1.85 m (6 ft 1 in)
- Position: Centre forward

Senior career*
Years	Team	Apps	(Gls)
1997	HJK	21	(11)
1998–1999	Jazz	31	(7)
1999–2000	HJK	32	(19)
2000–2002	Heerenveen	6	(0)
2002–2003	Denizlispor	0	(0)
2004	FJK	21	(17)
2005–2016	Lahti	250	(103)
Total		361	(157)
- * Club domestic league appearances and goals as of 1 December 2014

Rafael Pires Vieira (born 1 August 1978), better known simply as Rafael, is a Brazilian former football centre forward. He played a large part of his career in the Veikkausliiga in Finland, winning the goal kingship twice and becoming a Veikkausliiga legend in 2019.

== Honours ==
Individual

- Veikkausliiga Top Scorer: 2007
