= 1940 Mestaruussarja – Finnish League Competition =

Mestaruussarja
- Season: 1940
- Champions: Sudet Viipuri

The 1940 season was the 11th completed season of Finnish Football League Championship but was played as a cup competition.

== Overview ==
The 1940 Mestaruussarja could not be played and a cup competition was held instead.

== Semi-finals ==
Tie no	Team 1	Score	Team 2
1	TPS Turku	6–3	VPS Vaasa
2	Sudet Viipuri	2–1	HJK Helsinki

== Championship final ==
Tie no	Team 1	Score	Team 2
1	Sudet Viipuri	2–0	TPS Turku
