= 1949 Mestaruussarja =

Mestaruussarja
- Season: 1949
- Champions: TPS Turku
- Relegated: HIFK Helsinki; HJK Helsinki; HPS Helsinki; TuTo Turku

The 1949 season was the 19th completed season of Finnish Football League Championship, known as the Mestaruussarja.

== Overview ==
The Mestaruussarja was administered by the Finnish Football Association and the competition's 1949 season was contested by 12 teams. TPS Turku won the championship and the four lowest placed teams of the competition, HIFK Helsinki, HJK Helsinki, HPS Helsinki and TuTo Turku, were relegated to the Suomensarja.

== League standings ==
Pos	Team	Pld	W	D	L	GF	GA	GD	Pts
1	TPS Turku (C)	22	15	4	3	53	25	+28	34
2	VPS Vaasa	22	15	3	4	59	29	+30	33
3	KIF Helsinki	22	14	4	4	60	40	+20	32
4	VIFK Vaasa	22	10	7	5	61	31	+30	27
5	KTP Kotka	22	10	6	6	38	34	+4	26
6	TuWe Turku	22	9	3	10	39	42	−3	21
7	IKissat Tampere	22	7	6	9	48	49	−1	20
8	KuPS Kuopio	22	7	5	10	38	41	−3	19
9	HIFK Helsinki (R)	22	7	2	13	38	52	−14	16
10	HJK Helsinki (R)	22	5	4	13	27	55	−28	14
11	HPS Helsinki (R)	22	3	7	12	27	54	−27	13
12	TuTo Turku (R)	22	1	7	14	18	54	−36	9

(C) Champions; (R) Relegated

== Results ==
Home \ Away	HFK	HJK	HPS	IK	KIF	KTP	KPS	TPS	TTT	TW	VIF	VPS
HIFK		2–1	1–2	3–0	1–1	2–3	0–2	0–3	1–2	3–1	0–6	2–3
HJK	1–4		0–3	1–1	1–6	2–1	2–5	1–3	1–0	6–1	0–2	1–1
HPS	3–7	1–1		4–4	1–2	1–1	2–2	0–2	1–1	0–3	1–0	0–4
IKissat	4–2	6–2	3–1		1–2	1–2	5–1	3–1	2–2	2–4	3–3	0–2
KIF	3–2	3–1	1–1	3–1		3–3	1–3	3–2	9–1	2–1	2–1	4–3
KTP	2–0	5–0	2–0	3–2	2–1		3–0	0–3	2–1	1–1	4–0	1–4
KuPS	1–2	0–1	2–1	1–1	1–2	1–1		2–3	7–0	2–1	2–2	0–3
TPS	1–0	5–1	4–0	1–3	5–1	1–1	2–1		1–0	2–1	2–2	3–1
TuTo	0–1	1–1	3–3	1–2	2–3	0–0	1–1	1–3		0–2	1–1	0–6
TuWe	4–2	3–1	3–1	1–1	1–3	2–0	0–4	2–2	3–0		1–3	1–0
VIFK	7–1	0–1	5–1	4–1	3–3	7–0	7–0	1–1	1–0	3–1		1–4
VPS	2–2	2–1	3–0	5–2	3–2	2–1	1–0	1–3	3–1	4–2	2–2	

Legend: Blue = home team win; Yellow = draw; Red = away team win.
