= Aatos Lehtonen =

Finnish sportsperson (1914–2005)

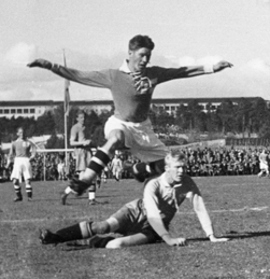
- Lehtonen in the 1930s

Personal information
- Born: 15 February 1914 Helsinki, Finland
- Died: 10 April 2005 (aged 91) Hyvinkää, Finland

Sport
- Sport: Association football
- Club: Helsingin Ponnistus (1931–33); Helsingin Jalkapalloklubi (1934–1947)

Aatos Ensio Lehtonen (15 February 1914 – 6 November 2005) was a Finnish association football forward. He was part of the Finnish team that finished ninth at the 1936 Summer Olympics. He was the best Finnish scorer at the national championships in 1935–39, and won two national titles in 1936 and 1938. During those years he scored 109 goals, 25 of them in 14 matches in 1937. Internationally he capped for Finland 19 times and scored 7 goals. He retired in 1947 to become a Finnish national coach until 1955. In 1956–58 he worked at his previous club Helsingin Ponnistus (HJK), and in 1959 returned to the national team. In parallel he worked for the Finnish railways in Hyvinkää between 1956 and 1977, wrote articles for the weekly sports magazine Urheilulehti, and translated books on football training into Finnish. In 1993, he was inducted into the Finnish Football Hall of Fame.

Besides football Lehtonen won the 1937 Finnish title in bandy with HJK. He also competed in handball and basketball.
