= Helsingin Palloseura =

Finnish sports club

- Full name: Helsingin Palloseura
- Nicknames: HPS, Vihreät Jääkärit (Green Rangers)
- Founded: 1917; 109 years ago
- Ground: JYA AREENA, Helsinki, Finland
- Capacity: 2000
- Chairman: Kurt Grönlund
- Manager: Janne Viljamaa, Ramiro Muñoz
- League: Kakkonen
- 2026: Kakkonen Group A, 6th of 10
- Website: https://www.hps.fi/
Home colours

Helsingin Palloseura (HPS) (English: Helsinki Ball Game Club) is a sports club from Helsinki, Finland established in 1917. HPS has been active in several sports including bandy, ice hockey, football, handball and basketball.

Historically, HPS men's team is one of the most successful football teams in Finland, winning nine national championships during the 1920s and 1930s. The team is currently playing in the fourth highest league, however. In bandy, the club was the runner-up for the Finnish championship in 1920.

Famous HPS footballers have included William Kanerva, Aulis Koponen, Max Viinioksa, Kai Pahlman, Jyrki Heliskoski and Pertti Alaja.

== Football ==
=== Achievements ===
HPS Helsinki's men's team won the Finnish football championship (Mestaruussarja) 9 times and they also played in the European Cup, against Stade de Reims in 1958–59. Their one success in the Men's Finnish Cup (Miesten Suomen Cup) was in 1962.

- Men's Finnish Champions (Mestaruussarja Winners): 1921, 1922, 1926, 1927, 1929, 1932, 1934, 1935, 1957
- Men's Finnish Cup (Miesten Suomen Cup): 1962

=== Brief history of men's team ===
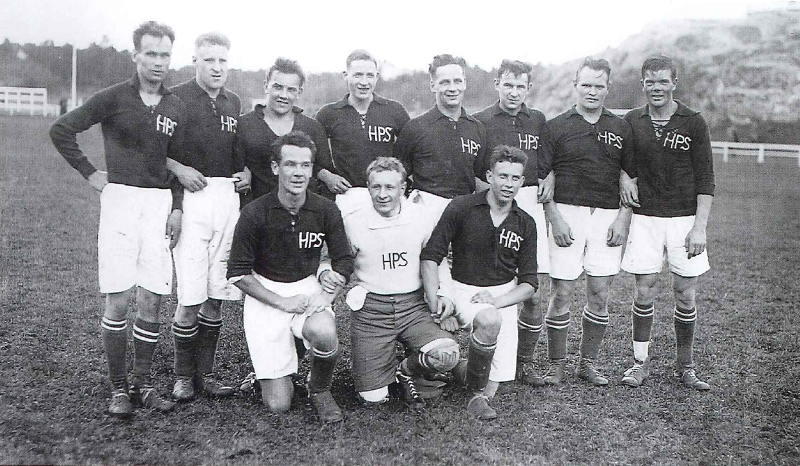
HPS team that won Finnish championship in 1927.

The first football match played by HPS men's team in September 1918 against HIFK. The club won their first Finnish championship three years later in 1921. It also won the Mestaruussarja championship in 1922, 1926, 1927 and 1929. However, the club's golden age was in the 1930s, when the HPS men won three championships over a four-year period (1932, 1934, 1935). Success at this time was also recognised by the large number of players receiving national recognition by representing the Finnish national side. In the 1940s success was in turn mixed with Finnish football having been disrupted by the war years. In 1940/41 HPS finished bottom of the Mestaruussarja and were relegated but were promoted back to the championship level in 1943/44.

They were relegated again in 1949 and did not compete in the Mestaruussarja again until 1956. They won the championship for the last time in 1957 and were most unfortunate a year later in 1958 when they finished equal on points with KuPS Kuopio to whom they then lost 1–0 in a championship play-off final. They maintained their place in the championship until 1964 when they were relegated, which was the last time that the club competed at the highest level.

There then followed a gradual downward spiral with HPS fluctuating between Miesten Ykkönen (Men's First Division), Miesten Kakkonen (Men's Second Division) and Miesten Kolmonen (Men's Third Division). In 1997 HPS returned to the Kakkonen which culminated in them reaching the play-offs at the end of 1998 season when they drew 0–0 and 1–1 against FC HIFK. However they missed out on promotion on away goals. Disaster was soon to follow as in 1999 HPS abandoned their place in the Kakkonen because of economic difficulties and had no option but to reform in 2000 at the lowest level in the Seiska (Seventh Division). However, in the last 10 years the club have seen 5 promotions and 1 relegation and they are now competing again in the Kolmonen.

=== European campaigns ===
HPS men have played in Europe on two occasions, the first time being in the European Cup in the 1958–59 season and the second time being in the Cup Winners' Cup in the 1963–64 season.

| Season | Competition | Round | Country | Club | Score | Agg. |
|---|---|---|---|---|---|---|
| 1958–59 | European Cup | Second round | (France) | Stade Reims | 0–4, v 0–3 | 0–7 |
| 1963–64 | European Cup Winners' Cup | Preliminary round | (Czechoslovakia) | ŠK Slovan Bratislava | 1–4, v 1–8 | 2–12 |

=== Divisional movements since 1930 ===
Top Level (28 seasons): 1930–42, 1945–49, 1956–64
Second Level (18 seasons): 1943/44, 1950–55, 1965–70, 1972, 1974–76, 1983
Third Level (13 seasons): 1971, 1973, 1977–82, 1984, 1988–89, 1997–98
Fourth level (19 seasons): 1985–87, 1990, 1992–93, 1995–96, 2009–23, 2025
Fifth Level (5 seasons): 1991, 1994, 2005, 2007–08, 2024
Sixth Level (2 seasons): 2004, 2006
Seventh Level (1 season): 2003
Eight Level (3 seasons): 2000–02

=== Season to season ===
Season to season of HPS
- 26 seasons in Veikkausliiga
- 18 seasons in 2nd tier
- 13 seasons in 3rd tier
- 24 seasons in 4th tier
- 6 seasons in 5th tier
- 2 seasons in 6th tier
- 1 season in 7th tier
- 3 seasons in 8th tier

| Season | Level | Division | Section | Administration | Position | Movements |
|---|---|---|---|---|---|---|
| 1930 | Tier 1 | A-Sarja (Premier League) | | Finnish FA (Suomen Palloliitto) | 3rd | |
| 1931 | Tier 1 | A-Sarja (Premier League) | | Finnish FA (Suomen Palloliitto) | 2nd | |
| 1932 | Tier 1 | A-Sarja (Premier League) | | Finnish FA (Suomen Palloliitto) | 1st | Champions |
| 1933 | Tier 1 | A-Sarja (Premier League) | | Finnish FA (Suomen Palloliitto) | 6th | |
| 1934 | Tier 1 | A-Sarja (Premier League) | | Finnish FA (Suomen Palloliitto) | 1st | Champions |
| 1935 | Tier 1 | A-Sarja (Premier League) | | Finnish FA (Suomen Palloliitto) | 1st | Champions |
| 1936 | Tier 1 | Mestaruussarja (Premier League) | | Finnish FA (Suomen Palloliitto) | 2nd | |
| 1937 | Tier 1 | Mestaruussarja (Premier League) | | Finnish FA (Suomen Palloliitto) | 4th | |
| 1938 | Tier 1 | Mestaruussarja (Premier League) | | Finnish FA (Suomen Palloliitto) | 5th | |
| 1939 | Tier 1 | Mestaruussarja (Premier League) | | Finnish FA (Suomen Palloliitto) | 5th | |
| 1940 | Cup Format | Cup-kilpailu (Premier League) | | Finnish FA (Suomen Palloliitto) | Round of 16 | |
| 1940-41 | Tier 1 | Mestaruussarja (Premier League) | | Finnish FA (Suomen Palloliitto) | 8th | Relegated |
| 1942 | Cup Format | Cup-kilpailu (Premier League) | | Finnish FA (Suomen Palloliitto) | Semifinals | Withdraw at semifinals |
| 1943-44 | Tier 2 | 'Suomensarja (First Division) | | Finnish FA (Suomen Palloliitto) | 1st | Promoted |
| 1945 | Tier 1 | Mestaruussarja (Premier League) | Group B | Finnish FA (Suomen Palloliitto) | 3rd | |
| 1945-46 | Tier 1 | Mestaruussarja (Premier League) | | Finnish FA (Suomen Palloliitto) | 4th | |
| 1946-47 | Tier 1 | Mestaruussarja (Premier League) | | Finnish FA (Suomen Palloliitto) | 5th | |
| 1947-48 | Tier 1 | Mestaruussarja (Premier League) | | Finnish FA (Suomen Palloliitto) | 3rd | |
| 1948 | Tier 1 | Mestaruussarja (Premier League) | | Finnish FA (Suomen Palloliitto) | 3rd | |
| 1949 | Tier 1 | Mestaruussarja (Premier League) | | Finnish FA (Suomen Palloliitto) | 11th | Relegated |
| 1950 | Tier 2 | 'Suomensarja (First Division) | East Group | Finnish FA (Suomen Palloliitto) | 7th | |
| 1951 | Tier 2 | 'Suomensarja (First Division) | East Group | Finnish FA (Suomen Palloliitto) | 5th | |
| 1952 | Tier 2 | 'Suomensarja (First Division) | East Group | Finnish FA (Suomen Palloliitto) | 5th | |
| 1953 | Tier 2 | 'Suomensarja (First Division) | East Group | Finnish FA (Suomen Palloliitto) | 2nd | |
| 1954 | Tier 2 | 'Suomensarja (First Division) | East Group | Finnish FA (Suomen Palloliitto) | 3rd | |
| 1955 | Tier 2 | 'Suomensarja (First Division) | East Group | Finnish FA (Suomen Palloliitto) | 1st | Promoted |
| 1956 | Tier 1 | Mestaruussarja (Premier League) | | Finnish FA (Suomen Palloliitto) | 8th | |
| 1957 | Tier 1 | Mestaruussarja (Premier League) | | Finnish FA (Suomen Palloliitto) | 1st | Champions |
| 1958 | Tier 1 | Mestaruussarja (Premier League) | | Finnish FA (Suomen Palloliitto) | 2nd | |
| 1959 | Tier 1 | Mestaruussarja (Premier League) | | Finnish FA (Suomen Palloliitto) | 5th | |
| 1960 | Tier 1 | Mestaruussarja (Premier League) | | Finnish FA (Suomen Palloliitto) | 4th | |
| 1961 | Tier 1 | Mestaruussarja (Premier League) | | Finnish FA (Suomen Palloliitto) | 7th | |
| 1962 | Tier 1 | Mestaruussarja (Premier League) | | Finnish FA (Suomen Palloliitto) | 6th | |
| 1963 | Tier 1 | Mestaruussarja (Premier League) | | Finnish FA (Suomen Palloliitto) | 8th | |
| 1964 | Tier 1 | Mestaruussarja (Premier League) | | Finnish FA (Suomen Palloliitto) | 10th | Relegated |
| 1965 | Tier 2 | 'Suomensarja (First Division) | East Group | Finnish FA (Suomen Palloliitto) | 5th | |
| 1966 | Tier 2 | 'Suomensarja (First Division) | East Group | Finnish FA (Suomen Palloliitto) | 8th | |
| 1967 | Tier 2 | 'Suomensarja (First Division) | East Group | Finnish FA (Suomen Palloliitto) | 7th | |
| 1968 | Tier 2 | 'Suomensarja (First Division) | South Group | Finnish FA (Suomen Palloliitto) | 3rd | |
| 1969 | Tier 2 | 'Suomensarja (First Division) | South Group | Finnish FA (Suomen Palloliitto) | 6th | |
| 1970 | Tier 2 | II Divisioona (First Division) | East Group | Finnish FA (Suomen Palloliitto) | 13th | Relegated |
| 1971 | Tier 3 | III Divisioona (Second Division) | Group 1 Helsinki & Uusimaa | Finnish FA (Suomen Pallolitto) | 1st | Promoted |
| 1972 | Tier 2 | II Divisioona (First Division) | East Group | Finnish FA (Suomen Palloliitto) | 5th | |
| 1973 | Tier 3 | II Divisioona (Second Division) | East Group | Finnish FA (Suomen Pallolitto) | 1st | Promoted |
| 1974 | Tier 2 | I Divisioona (First Division) | | Finnish FA (Suomen Palloliitto) | 5th | |
| 1975 | Tier 2 | I Divisioona (First Division) | | Finnish FA (Suomen Palloliitto) | 7th | |
| 1976 | Tier 2 | I Divisioona (First Division) | | Finnish FA (Suomen Palloliitto) | 11th | Relegated |
| 1977 | Tier 3 | II Divisioona (Second Division) | East Group | Finnish FA (Suomen Pallolitto) | 3rd | |
| 1978 | Tier 3 | II Divisioona (Second Division) | East Group | Finnish FA (Suomen Pallolitto) | 3rd | |
| 1979 | Tier 3 | II Divisioona (Second Division) | East Group | Finnish FA (Suomen Pallolitto) | 3rd | Promotion Playoff |
| 1980 | Tier 3 | II Divisioona (Second Division) | West Group | Finnish FA (Suomen Pallolitto) | 6th | |
| 1981 | Tier 3 | II Divisioona (Second Division) | East Group | Finnish FA (Suomen Pallolitto) | 2nd | Promotion Playoff |
| 1982 | Tier 3 | II Divisioona (Second Division) | East Group | Finnish FA (Suomen Pallolitto) | 1st | Promotion Playoff - Promoted |
| 1983 | Tier 2 | I Divisioona (First Division) | | Finnish FA (Suomen Palloliitto) | 12th | Relegation Group 7th - Relegated |
| 1984 | Tier 3 | II Divisioona (Second Division) | East Group | Finnish FA (Suomen Pallolitto) | 10th | Relegated |
| 1985 | Tier 4 | III Divisioona (Third Division) | Group 2 | Helsinki & Uusimaa (SPL Uusimaa) | 7th | |
| 1986 | Tier 4 | III Divisioona (Third Division) | Group 1 | Helsinki & Uusimaa (SPL Uusimaa) | 3rd | |
| 1987 | Tier 4 | III Divisioona (Third Division) | Group 1 | Helsinki & Uusimaa (SPL Uusimaa) | 1st | Promoted |
| 1988 | Tier 3 | II Divisioona (Second Division) | East Group | Finnish FA (Suomen Pallolitto) | 9th | |
| 1989 | Tier 3 | II Divisioona (Second Division) | East Group | Finnish FA (Suomen Pallolitto) | 12th | Relegated |
| 1990 | Tier 4 | Kolmonen (Third Division) | Group 2 | Helsinki & Uusimaa (SPL Uusimaa) | 11th | Relegated |
| 1991 | Tier 5 | Nelonen (Fourth Division) | Group 1 | Helsinki District (SPL Helsinki) | 2nd | Promotion Playoff - Promoted |
| 1992 | Tier 4 | Kolmonen (Third Division) | Group 1 | Helsinki & Uusimaa (SPL Uusimaa) | 9th | |
| 1993 | Tier 4 | Kolmonen (Third Division) | Group 2 | Helsinki & Uusimaa (SPL Uusimaa) | 11th | Relegated |
| 1994 | Tier 5 | Nelonen (Fourth Division) | Group 2 | Helsinki District (SPL Helsinki) | 1st | Promoted |
| 1995 | Tier 4 | Kolmonen (Third Division) | Group 2 | Helsinki & Uusimaa (SPL Uusimaa) | 7th | |
| 1996 | Tier 4 | Kolmonen (Third Division) | Group 1 | Helsinki & Uusimaa (SPL Uusimaa) | 1st | Promoted |
| 1997 | Tier 3 | Kakkonen (Second Division) | East Group | Finnish FA (Suomen Pallolitto) | 9th | |
| 1998 | Tier 3 | Kakkonen (Second Division) | South Group | Finnish FA (Suomen Pallolitto) | 2nd | Play-offs |
| 1999 | | Withdrew from Kakkonen | | | | |
| 2000 | Tier 8 | Seiska (Seventh Division) | Section 1 | Helsinki District (SPL Helsinki) | 9th | |
| 2001 | Tier 8 | Seiska (Seventh Division) | Section 4 | Helsinki District (SPL Helsinki) | 14th | |
| 2002 | Tier 8 | Seiska (Seventh Division) | Section 5 | Helsinki District (SPL Helsinki) | 2nd | Promoted |
| 2003 | Tier 7 | Kutonen (Sixth Division) | Section 2 | Helsinki District (SPL Helsinki) | 1st | Promoted |
| 2004 | Tier 6 | Vitonen (Fifth Division) | Helsinki | Helsinki District (SPL Helsinki) | 3rd | Promoted |
| 2005 | Tier 5 | Nelonen (Fourth Division) | Section 2 | Helsinki District (SPL Helsinki) | 11th | Relegated |
| 2006 | Tier 6 | Vitonen (Fifth Division) | Section 1 | Helsinki District (SPL Helsinki) | 1st | Promoted |
| 2007 | Tier 5 | Nelonen (Fourth Division) | Section 1 | Helsinki District (SPL Helsinki) | 3rd | |
| 2008 | Tier 5 | Nelonen (Fourth Division) | Section 2 | Helsinki District (SPL Helsinki) | 1st | Promoted |
| 2009 | Tier 4 | Kolmonen (Third Division) | Section 1 | Helsinki & Uusimaa (SPL Uusimaa) | 9th | |
| 2010 | Tier 4 | Kolmonen (Third Division) | Section 1 | Helsinki & Uusimaa (SPL Uusimaa) | 6th | |
| 2011 | Tier 4 | Kolmonen (Third Division) | Section 2 | Helsinki & Uusimaa (SPL Uusimaa) | 6th | |
| 2012 | Tier 4 | Kolmonen (Third Division) | Section 1 | Helsinki & Uusimaa (SPL Uusimaa) | 7th | |
| 2013 | Tier 4 | Kolmonen (Third Division) | Section 2 | Helsinki & Uusimaa (SPL Uusimaa) | 6th | |
| 2014 | Tier 4 | Kolmonen (Third Division) | Section 1 | Helsinki & Uusimaa (SPL Uusimaa) | 12th | |
| 2015 | Tier 4 | Kolmonen (Third Division) | Section 1 | Helsinki & Uusimaa (SPL Uusimaa) | 5th | |
| 2016 | Tier 4 | Kolmonen (Third Division) | Section 2 | Helsinki & Uusimaa (SPL Uusimaa) | 5th | |
| 2017 | Tier 4 | Kolmonen (Third Division) | Section 1 | Helsinki & Uusimaa (SPL Uusimaa) | 5th | |
| 2018 | Tier 4 | Kolmonen (Third Division) | Group 2 | Helsinki & Uusimaa (SPL Uusimaa) | 8th | |
| 2019 | Tier 4 | Kolmonen (Third Division) | Group 1 | Helsinki & Uusimaa (SPL Uusimaa) | 3rd | |
| 2020 | Tier 4 | Kolmonen (Third Division) | Group A | Helsinki & Uusimaa (SPL Uusimaa) | 5th | |
| 2021 | Tier 4 | Kolmonen (Third Division) | Group B Southern | Finnish FA (Suomen Pallolitto) | 2nd | |
| 2022 | Tier 4 | Kolmonen (Third Division) | Group C Southern | Finnish FA (Suomen Pallolitto) | 2nd | |
| 2023 | Tier 4 | Kolmonen (Third Division) | Southern Group B | Finnish FA (Suomen Pallolitto) | 2nd | |
| 2024 | Tier 5 | Kolmonen (Third Division) | Group B | Finnish FA (Suomen Pallolitto) | 1st | Promotion Playoff - Promoted |
| 2025 | Tier 4 | Kakkonen (Second Division) | Group B | Finnish FA (Suomen Pallolitto) | | |

=== Junior Football ===
The club has a youth section running a large number of teams with around 700 players.

=== Current season Women ===
For the season 2018 the representative team of HPS, HPS women's I, competes in the Naisten Ykkönen, in the second highest national level.

=== Current women's Squad ===
Note: Flags indicate national team as defined under FIFA eligibility rules; some limited exceptions apply. Players may hold more than one non-FIFA nationality.

| No. | Pos. | Nation | Player |
|---|---|---|---|
| 1 | | FIN | Ida-Sofia Helppikangas |
| 3 | | FIN | Ella Haaksluoto |
| 4 | | FIN | Hanna Posa |
| 6 | | FIN | Ella Andberg |
| 7 | | FIN | Emilia Pessi |
| 9 | | FIN | Julianna Jatkola |
| 10 | | FIN | Alina Kosunen |
| 12 | | FIN | Piipa Kämppi |
| 13 | | FIN | Jessica Kiviaho |
| 14 | | FIN | Aino-Marja Lehtinen |
| 17 | | FIN | Ada Torala |
| 19 | | FIN | Tessa Auvinen |
| 20 | | FIN | Nina Eid |
| 21 | | FIN | Minna Pelkonen |
| 22 | | FIN | Oona Antola |
| 23 | | FIN | Anna Eld |
| 24 | | FIN | Emilia Ukkonen |
| 51 | | FIN | Julia Säppi |
| 52 | | FIN | Maiju Hirvonen |
| 70 | | FIN | Taru Kalliovaara |
| 91 | | FIN | Dali Meller |
| 92 | | FIN | Hanna Onufriew |

=== Current season men ===
For the 2014 season HPS men compete in Section 1 (Lohko 1) of the Kolmonen administered by the Helsinki SPL and Uusimaa SPL. This is the fourth highest tier in the Finnish football system.

HPS/2 men are participating in Section 1 (Lohko 1) of the Nelonen administered by the Helsinki SPL.

HPS/Jägers are participating in Section 3 (Lohko 3) of the Kutonen administered by the Helsinki SPL.

=== Current men's Squad ===
Note: Flags indicate national team as defined under FIFA eligibility rules; some limited exceptions apply. Players may hold more than one non-FIFA nationality.

| No. | Pos. | Nation | Player |
|---|---|---|---|
| 4 | | FIN | Juho Silvola |
| 6 | | FIN | Janne Sihvonen |
| 10 | | FIN | Antti Hakala |
| 11 | | FIN | Janne Löfberg |
| 12 | | FIN | Jere Paavilainen |
| 14 | | FIN | Emil Asp |
| 16 | | FIN | Tatu Virtanen |
| 17 | | FIN | Tomas O'Shaugnessy |
| 18 | | FIN | Sami Hellström |
| 19 | | FIN | Pasi Paakki |
| 22 | | FIN | Janne Herranen |
| 23 | | FIN | Henrik Peltoniemi |
| 25 | | FIN | Sami Salmi |
| 28 | | FIN | Juho Iso-Kuusela |
| 29 | | FIN | Tim Basili |
| 31 | | FIN | Timo Aalto |

| No. | Pos. | Nation | Player |
|---|---|---|---|
| 36 | | FIN | Valtteri Frantsi |
| 37 | | FIN | Joni Knuutinen |
| 42 | | FIN | Aleksi Honkonen |

== Ice hockey ==
HPS played in SM-sarja for five seasons (1928, 1929, 1932, 1933 and 1934)

== References and sources ==
- (in Finnish) Official Website
- (in Finnish) Helsingin Palloseura – Finnish Wikipedia
- (in Finnish) Suomen Cup
- (in Finnish) Helsingin Palloseura Facebook
