= Åbo IFK =

Finnish sports club

- Full name: Idrottsföreningen Kamraterna i Åbo
- Nickname: Kanarialinnut
- Founded: 1908; 118 years ago
- Ground: Urheilupuiston yläkenttä, Turku, Finland
- Capacity: 1,500
- Chairman: Kari Bäcklund
- Manager: Salonen Mika
- League: Kakkonen
- 2026: Kakkonen Group B, 2nd of 10
Home colours

Åbo IFK (or ÅIFK for short) is a sports club from Turku, Finland. The club was founded in 1908, and originally represented the Swedish-speaking minority of Turku/Åbo.

== Background ==
The greatest successes of ÅIFK have come in football where it has won three Finnish championship titles, in 1910, 1920 and 1924. It has played a total of 9 seasons in the Finnish premier division Mestaruussarja, the last occasion in 1967. It also won the Finnish Cup in 1965 and participated in the UEFA Cup Winners' Cup in the 1966–67 season, going out in the first round. Currently the ÅIFK football team is playing in the fourth tier Kolmonen.

ÅIFK has also fared well in handball with both its men's and women's teams playing at the national top level at the moment.

Currently the club has activities in football, handball, athletics and bowling.

The highest ever attendance for a ÅIFK match was in 1967 when 5,861 people attended the home game with Turun Palloseura.

== Football honours ==
- Finnish Championship:
  - Winners (3): 1910, 1920, 1924
  - Runners-up (5): 1911, 1913, 1915, 1916, 1917
- Finnish Cup:
  - Winners (1): 1965 (ÅIFK – TPS 1–0)

== Divisional movements since 1930 ==
Top Level (9 seasons): 1930, 1932–35, 1963–65, 1967
Second Level (13 seasons): 1931, 1936, 1938–39, 1943/44-45, 1961–62, 1966, 1968–70, 2000
Third Level (34 seasons): 1937, 1940–1941, 1945–1949, 1952, 1954–1960, 1971, 1986, 1988–89, 1991, 1994–96, 1998–99, 2001, 2008–2015
Fourth Level (31 seasons) : 1950–1951, 1953, 1972–1982, 1985, 1987, 1990, 1992–1993, 1997, 2002–2007, 2016 to current
Fifth Level (2 seasons) : 1983–1984

== Season to season ==
Season to Season

Season	Level	Division	Section	Administration	Position	Movements
1930	Tier 1	A-sarja		Finnish FA (Suomen Palloliitto)	8th	Relegated
1931	Tier 2	B-sarja (First Division)		Finnish FA (Suomen Pallolitto)	1st	Promoted
1932	Tier 1	A-sarja		Finnish FA (Suomen Palloliitto)	6th	
1933	Tier 1	A-sarja		Finnish FA (Suomen Palloliitto)	5th	
1934	Tier 1	A-sarja		Finnish FA (Suomen Palloliitto)	6th	
1935	Tier 1	A-sarja		Finnish FA (Suomen Palloliitto)	7th	Relegated
1936	Tier 2	Itä-Länsi-sarja (First Division)	West Group	Finnish FA (Suomen Pallolitto)	6th	Relegated
1937	Tier 3	Maakuntasarja (Second Division)	West Group	Finnish FA (Suomen Pallolitto)	?	Promotion play-off, Promoted
1938	Tier 2	Itä-Länsi-sarja (First Division)	West Series, South Group	Finnish FA (Suomen Pallolitto)	2nd	
1939	Tier 2	Itä-Länsi-sarja (First Division)	West Group 2	Finnish FA (Suomen Pallolitto)	1st	Promotion Group 2nd
1940–41	Tier 3	C-sarja (Second Division)	Group 1	Finnish FA (Suomen Pallolitto)	1st	Promotion Group 1st, Promoted
1943–44	Tier 2	Suomensarja (First Division)		Finnish FA (Suomen Pallolitto)	5th	
1945	Tier 2	Suomensarja (First Division)	Group 1	Finnish FA (Suomen Pallolitto)	4th	Relegated
1945–46	Tier 3	Maakuntasarja (Second Division)	Finland Proper	Finnish FA (Suomen Pallolitto)	3rd	
1946–47	Tier 3	Maakuntasarja (Second Division)	Finland Proper	Finnish FA (Suomen Pallolitto)	1st	Promotion play-off
1947–48	Tier 3	Maakuntasarja (Second Division)	Finland Proper	Finnish FA (Suomen Pallolitto)	2nd	
1948	Tier 3	Maakuntasarja (Second Division)	West Group B	Finnish FA (Suomen Pallolitto)	3rd	
1949	Tier 3	Maakuntasarja (Second Division)	West Group B	Finnish FA (Suomen Pallolitto)	6th	Relegated
1950	Tier 4	Piirisarja (Third Division)		Turku District (SPL Turku)	6th	
1951	Tier 4	Maakuntasarja qualifications		Finnish FA (Suomen Pallolitto)	Cup-format	Promoted
1952	Tier 3	Maakuntasarja (Second Division)	West Group A	Finnish FA (Suomen Pallolitto)	7th	Relegated
1953	Tier 4	Piirisarja (Third Division)		Turku District (SPL Turku)	1st	Promotion play-off, Promoted
1954	Tier 3	Maakuntasarja (Second Division)	West Group 2	Finnish FA (Suomen Pallolitto)	1st	Promotion Group West 8th
1955	Tier 3	Maakuntasarja (Second Division)	West Group 1	Finnish FA (Suomen Pallolitto)	2nd	
1956	Tier 3	Maakuntasarja (Second Division)	West Group 2	Finnish FA (Suomen Pallolitto)	5th	
1957	Tier 3	Maakuntasarja (Second Division)	West Group 1	Finnish FA (Suomen Pallolitto)	2nd	
1958	Tier 3	Maakuntasarja (Second Division)	Group 3	Finnish FA (Suomen Pallolitto)	2nd	
1959	Tier 3	Maakuntasarja (Second Division)	Group 3	Finnish FA (Suomen Pallolitto)	2nd	
1960	Tier 3	Maakuntasarja (Second Division)	Group 3	Finnish FA (Suomen Pallolitto)	1st	Promoted
1961	Tier 2	Suomensarja (First Division)	West Group	Finnish FA (Suomen Pallolitto)	6th	
1962	Tier 2	Suomensarja (First Division)	West Group	Finnish FA (Suomen Pallolitto)	1st	Promoted
1963	Tier 1	Mestaruussarja		Finnish FA (Suomen Palloliitto)	3rd	
1964	Tier 1	Mestaruussarja		Finnish FA (Suomen Palloliitto)	8th	
1965	Tier 1	Mestaruussarja		Finnish FA (Suomen Palloliitto)	11th	Relegated
1966	Tier 2	Suomensarja (First Division)	West Group	Finnish FA (Suomen Pallolitto)	1st	Promoted
1967	Tier 1	Mestaruussarja		Finnish FA (Suomen Palloliitto)	11th	Relegated
1968	Tier 2	Suomensarja (First Division)	West Group	Finnish FA (Suomen Pallolitto)	2nd	
1969	Tier 2	Suomensarja (First Division)	South Group	Finnish FA (Suomen Pallolitto)	2nd	
1970	Tier 2	II divisioona (First Division)	West Group	Finnish FA (Suomen Pallolitto)	11th	Relegated
1971	Tier 3	III divisioona (Second Division)	Group 2	Finnish FA (Suomen Pallolitto)	11th	Relegated
1972	Tier 4	IV divisioona (Third Division)	Group 5	Finnish FA(Suomen Palloliitto)	1st	
1973	Tier 4	III divisioona (Third Division)	Group 3	Finnish FA(Suomen Palloliitto)	7th	
1974	Tier 4	III divisioona (Third Division)	Group 3	Finnish FA(Suomen Palloliitto)	5th	
1975	Tier 4	III divisioona (Third Division)	Group 4	Finnish FA(Suomen Palloliitto)	4th	
1976	Tier 4	III divisioona (Third Division)	Group 4	Finnish FA(Suomen Palloliitto)	4th	
1977	Tier 4	III divisioona (Third Division)	Group 4	Finnish FA (Suomen Pallolitto)	3rd	
1978	Tier 4	III divisioona (Third Division)	Group 3	Finnish FA (Suomen Pallolitto)	9th	Relegation Playoff
1979	Tier 4	III divisioona (Third Division)	Group 3	Finnish FA (Suomen Pallolitto)	7th	
1980	Tier 4	III divisioona (Third Division)	Group 3	Finnish FA (Suomen Pallolitto)	2nd	Promotion play-offs
1981	Tier 4	III divisioona (Third Division)	Group 3	Finnish FA (Suomen Pallolitto)	2nd	Promotion Playoff
1982	Tier 4	III divisioona (Third Division)	Group 3	Finnish FA (Suomen Pallolitto)	11th	Relegated
1983	Tier 5	IV divisioona (Fourth Division)	Group 5	Turku District (SPL Turku)	3rd	
1984	Tier 5	IV divisioona (Fourth Division)	Group 4	Turku District (SPL Turku)	1st	Promoted
1985	Tier 4	III divisioona (Third Division)	Group 3	Finnish FA (Suomen Pallolitto)	1st	Promoted
1986	Tier 3	II divisioona (Second Division)	West Group	Finnish FA (Suomen Pallolitto)	12th	Relegated
1987	Tier 4	III divisioona (Third Division)	Group 3	Finnish FA (Suomen Pallolitto)	1st	Promoted
1988	Tier 3	II divisioona (Second Division)	West Group	Finnish FA (Suomen Pallolitto)	2nd	
1989	Tier 3	II divisioona (Second Division)	West Group	Finnish FA (Suomen Pallolitto)	11th	Relegated
1990	Tier 4	III divisioona (Third Division)	Group 3	Finnish FA (Suomen Pallolitto)	1st	Promoted
1991	Tier 3	II divisioona (Second Division)	West Group	Finnish FA (Suomen Pallolitto)	10th	Relegated
1992	Tier 4	III divisioona (Third Division)	Group 3	Finnish FA (Suomen Pallolitto)	3rd	
1993	Tier 4	III divisioona (Third Division)	Group 3	Finnish FA (Suomen Pallolitto)	1st	Promoted
1994	Tier 3	Kakkonen (Second Division)	West Group	Finnish FA (Suomen Pallolitto)	8th	
1995	Tier 3	Kakkonen (Second Division)	South Group	Finnish FA (Suomen Pallolitto)	7th	
1996	Tier 3	Kakkonen (Second Division)	South Group	Finnish FA (Suomen Pallolitto)	11th	Relegated
1997	Tier 4	III divisioona (Third Division)	Group 3	Turku District (SPL Turku)	1st	Promoted
1998	Tier 3	Kakkonen (Second Division)	South Group	Finnish FA (Suomen Pallolitto)	7th	
1999	Tier 3	Kakkonen (Second Division)	West Group	Finnish FA (Suomen Pallolitto)	1st	Promoted
2000	Tier 2	Ykkönen (First Division)	South Group	Finnish FA (Suomen Pallolitto)	9th	Relegation Group – 9th – Relegated
2001	Tier 3	Kakkonen (Second Division)	West Group	Finnish FA (Suomen Pallolitto)	10th	Relegated
2002	Tier 4	Kolmonen (Third Division)	Turku and Åland Islands	Turku District (SPL Turku)	4th	
2003	Tier 4	Kolmonen (Third Division)	Turku and Åland Islands	Turku District (SPL Turku)	1st	Play-offs
2004	Tier 4	Kolmonen (Third Division)	Turku and Åland Islands	Turku District (SPL Turku)	2nd	
2005	Tier 4	Kolmonen (Third Division)	Turku and Åland Islands	Turku District (SPL Turku)	4th	
2006	Tier 4	Kolmonen (Third Division)	Turku and Åland Islands	Turku District (SPL Turku)	2nd	
2007	Tier 4	Kolmonen (Third Division)	Turku and Åland Islands	Turku District (SPL Turku)	1st	Promoted
2008	Tier 3	Kakkonen (Second Division)	Group B	Finnish FA (Suomen Pallolitto)	8th	
2009	Tier 3	Kakkonen (Second Division)	Group B	Finnish FA (Suomen Pallolitto)	9th	
2010	Tier 3	Kakkonen (Second Division)	Group B	Finnish FA (Suomen Pallolitto)	7th	
2011	Tier 3	Kakkonen (Second Division)	Group B	Finnish FA (Suomen Pallolitto)	8th	
2012	Tier 3	Kakkonen (Second Division)	South Group	Finnish FA (Suomen Pallolitto)	1st	Play-offs
2013	Tier 3	Kakkonen (Second Division)	West Group	Finnish FA (Suomen Pallolitto)	7th	
2014	Tier 3	Kakkonen (Second Division)	West Group	Finnish FA (Suomen Pallolitto)	2nd	
2015	Tier 3	Kakkonen (Second Division)	West Group	Finnish FA (Suomen Pallolitto)	9th	Relegated
2016	Tier 4	Kolmonen (Third Division)	Turku & Åland Islands	Turku District (SPL Turku)	5th	
2017	Tier 4	Kolmonen (Third Division)	Western Finland	Western District (SPL-Länsi-Suomi)	9th	
2018	Tier 4	Kolmonen (Third Division)	Western Finland	Western District (SPL-Länsi-Suomi)	11th	
2019	Tier 4	Kolmonen (Third Division)	Western Finland	Western District (SPL-Länsi-Suomi)	6th	
2020	Tier 4	Kolmonen (Third Division)	Western Finland	Western District (SPL-Länsi-Suomi)	7th	
2021	Tier 4	Kolmonen (Third Division)	Western Finland	Western District (SPL -Länsi-Suomi)	5th	
2022	Tier 4	Kolmonen (Third Division)	Western Finland	Western District (SPL-Länsi-Suomi)	4th	
2023	Tier 4	Kolmonen (Third Division)	Western Finland	Western District (SPL-Länsi-Suomi)	2nd	
2024	Tier 4	Kolmonen (Third Division)	Western Finland	Western District (SPL-Länsi-Suomi)		

- 9 season in Mestaruussarja
- 13 season in Ykkönen
- 34 seasons in Kakkonen
- 31 seasons in Kolmonen
- 2 seasons in Nelonen

== Club structure ==
ÅIFK runs 2 men's teams, 1 veteran's teams, 7 boys teams, 1 ladies team, 4 girls teams and a Footballschool for girls.

== 2024 season ==
For the current season Åbo IFK are competing in Group A West of the Kolmonen. This is the fourth tier of the Finnish football system. In 2023 the team finished second in their section.

Åbo IFK 2 are participating in the Nelonen administered by the Turku SPL. This team has taken over a club called Goose Park Rangers FC that competed at this level in 2009.

Åbo IFK 3 are competing in the Vitonen administered by the Turku SPL. Last season Åbo IFK 2 were promoted to this level from the Kutonen.
