= Toverit Helsinki =

Finnish sports club

- Full name: Helsingin toverit
- Founded: 1916, Helsinki
- Dissolved: 1970
Home colours	Away colours

Toverit Helsinki (Finnish Helsingin toverit, 'Comrades of Helsinki') was a sports club in Helsinki, Finland, which was founded in 1916. Its history ended in 1970.

The club was founded in 1916 by group of athletes who left NMKY Helsinki.

The club was most based in the neighbourhoods of Vallila and Hermanni. Its sports included football, ice hockey, boxing, orienteering and athletics.

The club won the Finnish championship in football in 1942, although a regular league type competition could not be played due to the Continuation War, and the whole competition consisted of two cup rounds with a total of three matches. After 1942 their success in football faded due to part of the footballers went off to found a new club called Kallion Palloseura.

The club won bronze in football in 1934, 1935 and 1939.

Veikko Pakkanen and Viljo Huuska were among the sportsmen who founded the orienteering competition Jukola relay in 1948. The club was one of the organisers of the first two events in 1949 and 1950.

Beginning in 1923, the club participated in the pesäpallo ("Finnish baseball") Finnish Championship Series, achieving a bronze in that season.

In the 1950s and 1960s the club was active in youth work in ski jumping in the Helsinki area.

== Achievements ==
=== Season to Season ===
Season to Season

Season	Level	Division	Section	Administration	Position	Movements
1931	Tier 2	B-Sarja (First Division)		Finnish FA (Suomen Pallolitto)	2nd	Promoted
1932	Tier 1	A-Sarja (Division One)		Finnish FA (Suomen Palloliitto)	7th	Relegated
1933	Tier 2	B-Sarja (First Division)		Finnish FA (Suomen Pallolitto)	2nd	Promoted
1934	Tier 1	A-Sarja (Division One)		Finnish FA (Suomen Palloliitto)	3rd	
1935	Tier 1	A-Sarja (Division One)		Finnish FA (Suomen Palloliitto)	3rd	
1936	Tier 1	Mestaruussarja (Division One)		Finnish FA (Suomen Palloliitto)	5th	
1937	Tier 1	Mestaruussarja (Division One)		Finnish FA (Suomen Palloliitto)	5th	
1938	Tier 1	Mestaruussarja (Division One)		Finnish FA (Suomen Palloliitto)	4th	
1939	Tier 1	Mestaruussarja (Division One)		Finnish FA (Suomen Palloliitto)	3rd	
1940–41	Tier 1	Mestaruussarja (Division One)		Finnish FA (Suomen Palloliitto)	6th	Qualification Group, Relegated
1942	Cup-format	Cup-format		Finnish FA (Suomen Palloliitto)	1st	Champions
1943–44	Tier 2	Suomensarja (First Division)		Finnish FA (Suomen Pallolitto)	8th	
1945	Tier 2	Suomensarja (First Division)	Group 2	Finnish FA (Suomen Pallolitto)	8th	
1945–46	Tier 3	Maakuntasarja (Second Division)	Helsinki Group 1	Finnish FA (Suomen Pallolitto)	3rd	
1946–47	Tier 3	Maakuntasarja (Second Division)	Helsinki Group 2	Finnish FA (Suomen Pallolitto)	3rd	
1947–48	Tier 3	Maakuntasarja (Second Division)	Helsinki Group 2	Finnish FA (Suomen Pallolitto)	3rd	
1948	Tier 3	Maakuntasarja (Second Division)	South Group B	Finnish FA (Suomen Pallolitto)	6th	Relegated
1949	?	?	?	?	?	
1950	?	?	?	?	?	
1951	?	?	?	?	?	
1952	?	?	?	?	?	
1953	?	?	?	?	?	
1954	?	?	?	?	?	
1955	?	?	?	?	?	Promoted
1956	Tier 3	Maakuntasarja (Second Division)	South Group II	Finnish FA (Suomen Pallolitto)	5th	
1957	Tier 3	Maakuntasarja (Second Division)	South Group I	Finnish FA (Suomen Pallolitto)	4th	
1958	Tier 3	Maakuntasarja (Second Division)	First Group	Finnish FA (Suomen Pallolitto)	1st	Promoted
1959	Tier 2	Suomensarja (First Division)	South Group	Finnish FA (Suomen Pallolitto)	6th	
1960	Tier 2	Suomensarja (First Division)	South Group	Finnish FA (Suomen Pallolitto)	8th	
1961	Tier 2	Suomensarja (First Division)	East Group	Finnish FA (Suomen Pallolitto)	11th	Relegated
1962	Tier 3	Maakuntasarja (Second Division)	First Group	Finnish FA (Suomen Pallolitto)	7th	

- 8 seasons in First Level
- 7 seasons in Second Level
- 8 seasons in Third Level
