= Vaasan Palloseura =

Finnish football club

VPS
- Full name: Vaasan Palloseura
- Nicknames: Vepsu, Raita (The Stripe)
- Founded: 1924; 102 years ago
- Ground: Hietalahti, Vaasa, Finland
- Capacity: 6,009
- Chairman: Timo Harri
- Head coach: Jussi Nuorela
- League: Veikkausliiga
- 2026: Veikkausliiga, 6th of 12
- Website: vepsu.fi
Home colours	Away colours	Third colours

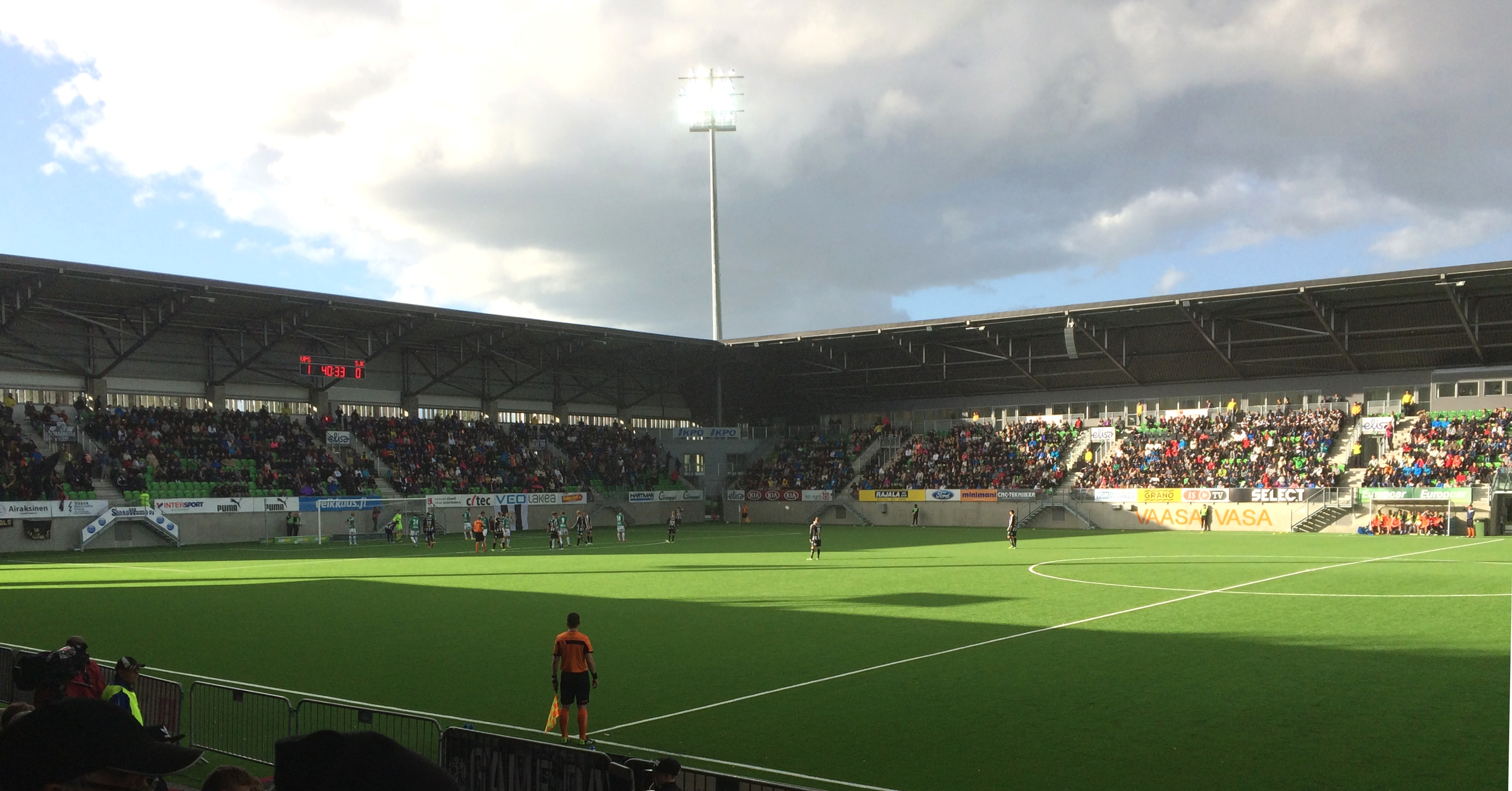
Hietalahden Jalkapallostadion

Vaasan Palloseura, commonly known as VPS, is a Finnish professional football club based in Vaasa. It currently plays in the first tier of Finnish football, Veikkausliiga. The club plays its home matches at Hietalahti Stadium. VPS played twice in the UEFA Cup, in 1998–99 and 1999–00.

== Achievements ==
- Mestaruussarja/Veikkausliiga
  - Winners: 1945, 1948
  - Runners-up: (5) 1932, 1940–41, 1949, 1997, 1998
  - Third place: (3) 1938, 2013, 2023
- Ykkönen
  - Winners: 2021
- Finnish Cup
  - Runners-up: 1972
- Finnish League Cup
  - Winners: 1999, 2000
  - Runners-up: 1997, 2014

== European campaigns ==
Season	Competition	Round	Club	1st leg	2nd leg	Aggregate
1998–99	UEFA Cup	1Q	(Faroe Islands) HB Tórshavn	0–2	4–0	4–2
1998–99	UEFA Cup	2Q	(Austria) Grazer AK	0–0	0–3	0–3
1999–00	UEFA Cup	QR	(Scotland) St Johnstone	1–1	0–2	1–3
2014–15	UEFA Europa League	1Q	(Sweden) IF Brommapojkarna	2–1	0–2	2–3
2015–16	UEFA Europa League	1Q	(Sweden) AIK	2–2	0–4	2–6
2017–18	UEFA Europa League	1Q	(Slovenia) Olimpija Ljubljana	1–0	1–0	2–0
2017–18	UEFA Europa League	2Q	(Denmark) Brøndby IF	0–2	2–1	2–3
2024–25	UEFA Conference League	1Q	(Lithuania) Žalgiris	1–2	0–1	1−3

== Season to season ==
Season to season

Season	Level	Division	Section	Administration	Position	Movements
1930	Tier 1	A-sarja (Premier League)		Finnish FA (Suomen Palloliitto)	5th	
1931	Tier 1	A-sarja (Premier League)		Finnish FA (Suomen Palloliitto)	4th	
1932	Tier 1	A-sarja (Premier League)		Finnish FA (Suomen Palloliitto)	2nd	
1933	Tier 1	A-sarja (Premier League)		Finnish FA (Suomen Palloliitto)	7th	Relegated
1934	Tier 2	Itä-Länsi-sarja (First Division)	West Group	Finnish FA (Suomen Palloliitto)	1st	Promotion Group 1st, Promoted
1935	Tier 1	Mestaruussarja (Premier League)		Finnish FA (Suomen Palloliitto)	5th	
1936	Tier 1	Mestaruussarja (Premier League)		Finnish FA (Suomen Palloliitto)	7th	Relegated
1937	Tier 2	Itä-Länsi-sarja (First Division)	West Group	Finnish FA (Suomen Palloliitto)	1st	Promotion Play-Off, Promoted
1938	Tier 1	Mestaruussarja (Premier League)		Finnish FA (Suomen Palloliitto)	3rd	
1939	Tier 1	Mestaruussarja (Premier League)		Finnish FA (Suomen Palloliitto)	6th	
1940-41	Tier 1	Mestaruussarja (Premier League)		Finnish FA (Suomen Palloliitto)	2nd	
1943-44	Tier 1	Mestaruussarja (Premier League)		Finnish FA (Suomen Palloliitto)	6th	
1945	Tier 1	Mestaruussarja Karsinta (Premier League Qualification)	Group 1	Finnish FA (Suomen Palloliitto)	3rd	Qualification to 1945-46 Mestaruussarja, Official Champions via cup-competition
1945-46	Tier 1	Mestaruussarja (Premier League)		Finnish FA (Suomen Palloliitto)	3rd	
1946-47	Tier 1	Mestaruussarja (Premier League)		Finnish FA (Suomen Palloliitto)	3rd	
1947-48	Tier 1	Mestaruussarja (Premier League)		Finnish FA (Suomen Palloliitto)	6th	
1948	Tier 1	Mestaruussarja (Premier League)		Finnish FA (Suomen Palloliitto)	1st	Championship Rematch, Champions
1949	Tier 1	Mestaruussarja (Premier League)		Finnish FA (Suomen Palloliitto)	2nd	
1950	Tier 1	Mestaruussarja (Premier League)		Finnish FA (Suomen Palloliitto)	5th	
1951	Tier 1	Mestaruussarja (Premier League)		Finnish FA (Suomen Palloliitto)	8th	
1952	Tier 1	Mestaruussarja (Premier League)		Finnish FA (Suomen Palloliitto)	6th	
1953	Tier 1	Mestaruussarja (Premier League)		Finnish FA (Suomen Palloliitto)	9th	Relegated
1954	Tier 2	Suomensarja (First Division)	West Group	Finnish FA (Suomen Palloliitto)	1st	Promoted
1955	Tier 1	Mestaruussarja (Premier League)		Finnish FA (Suomen Palloliitto)	5th	
1956	Tier 1	Mestaruussarja (Premier League)		Finnish FA (Suomen Palloliitto)	6th	
1957	Tier 1	Mestaruussarja (Premier League)		Finnish FA (Suomen Palloliitto)	7th	
1958	Tier 1	Mestaruussarja (Premier League)		Finnish FA (Suomen Palloliitto)	9th	Relegated
1959	Tier 2	Suomensarja (First Division)	North Group	Finnish FA (Suomen Palloliitto)	5th	
1960	Tier 2	Suomensarja (First Division)	North Group	Finnish FA (Suomen Palloliitto)	4th	
1961	Tier 2	Suomensarja (First Division)	North Group	Finnish FA (Suomen Palloliitto)	1st	Promotion Play-Off, Promoted
1962	Tier 1	Mestaruussarja (Premier League)		Finnish FA (Suomen Palloliitto)	10th	Relegated
1963	Tier 2	Suomensarja (First Division)	North Group	Finnish FA (Suomen Palloliitto)	2nd	
1964	Tier 2	Suomensarja (First Division)	North Group	Finnish FA (Suomen Palloliitto)	1st	Promoted
1965	Tier 1	Mestaruussarja (Premier League)		Finnish FA (Suomen Palloliitto)	9th	
1966	Tier 1	Mestaruussarja (Premier League)		Finnish FA (Suomen Palloliitto)	9th	
1967	Tier 1	Mestaruussarja (Premier League)		Finnish FA (Suomen Palloliitto)	9th	
1968	Tier 1	Mestaruussarja (Premier League)		Finnish FA (Suomen Palloliitto)	12th	Relegated
1969	Tier 2	II divisioona (First Division)	West Group	Finnish FA (Suomen Palloliitto)	4th	
1970	Tier 2	II divisioona (First Division)	North Group	Finnish FA (Suomen Palloliitto)	1st	Promoted
1971	Tier 1	Mestaruussarja (Premier League)		Finnish FA (Suomen Palloliitto)	10th	
1972	Tier 1	Mestaruussarja (Premier League)		Finnish FA (Suomen Palloliitto)	11th	Relegated
1973	Tier 2	I divisioona (First Division)		Finnish FA (Suomen Palloliitto)	3rd	
1974	Tier 2	I divisioona (First Division)		Finnish FA (Suomen Palloliitto)	2nd	Promoted
1975	Tier 1	Mestaruussarja (Premier League)		Finnish FA (Suomen Palloliitto)	7th	
1976	Tier 1	Mestaruussarja (Premier League)		Finnish FA (Suomen Palloliitto)	7th	
1977	Tier 1	Mestaruussarja (Premier League)		Finnish FA (Suomen Palloliitto)	12th	Relegated
1978	Tier 2	I divisioona (First Division)		Finnish FA (Suomen Palloliitto)	11th	Relegated
1979	Tier 3	II divisioona (Second Division)	North Group	Finnish FA (Suomen Pallolitto)	7th	
1980	Tier 3	II divisioona (Second Division)	North Group	Finnish FA (Suomen Pallolitto)	11th	Relegated
1981	Tier 4	III divisioona (Third Division)	Section 8		1st	Promotion play-offs, Promoted
1982	Tier 3	II divisioona (Second Division)	North Group	Finnish FA (Suomen Pallolitto)	3rd	
1983	Tier 3	II divisioona (Second Division)	North Group	Finnish FA (Suomen Pallolitto)	3rd	
1984	Tier 3	II divisioona (Second Division)	North Group	Finnish FA (Suomen Pallolitto)	5th	
1985	Tier 3	II divisioona (Second Division)	North Group	Finnish FA (Suomen Pallolitto)	5th	
1986	Tier 3	II divisioona (Second Division)	North Group	Finnish FA (Suomen Pallolitto)	2nd	
1987	Tier 3	II divisioona (Second Division)	North Group	Finnish FA (Suomen Pallolitto)	4th	
1988	Tier 3	II divisioona (Second Division)	North Group	Finnish FA (Suomen Pallolitto)	9th	
1989	Tier 3	II divisioona (Second Division)	North Group	Finnish FA (Suomen Pallolitto)	5th	
1990	Tier 3	II divisioona (Second Division)	North Group	Finnish FA (Suomen Pallolitto)	4th	
1991	Tier 3	II divisioona (Second Division)	North Group	Finnish FA (Suomen Pallolitto)	1st	Promoted
1992	Tier 2	I divisioona (First Division)		Finnish FA (Suomen Palloliitto)	5th	
1993	Tier 2	I divisioona (First Division)		Finnish FA (Suomen Palloliitto)	10th	
1994	Tier 2	Ykkönen (First Division)		Finnish FA (Suomen Palloliitto)	2nd	Promoted
1995	Tier 1	Veikkausliiga (Premier League)		Finnish FA (Suomen Palloliitto)	10th	
1996	Tier 1	Veikkausliiga (Premier League)		Finnish FA (Suomen Palloliitto)	7th	Relegation Group – 7th
1997	Tier 1	Veikkausliiga (Premier League)		Finnish FA (Suomen Palloliitto)	2nd	UEFA Cup First qualifying round
1998	Tier 1	Veikkausliiga (Premier League)		Finnish FA (Suomen Palloliitto)	2nd	UEFA Cup Qualifying round
1999	Tier 1	Veikkausliiga (Premier League)		Finnish FA (Suomen Palloliitto)	11th	Relegation Group – Play-offs
2000	Tier 1	Veikkausliiga (Premier League)		Finnish FA (Suomen Palloliitto)	10th	
2001	Tier 1	Veikkausliiga (Premier League)		Finnish FA (Suomen Palloliitto)	6th	
2002	Tier 1	Veikkausliiga (Premier League)		Finnish FA (Suomen Palloliitto)	11th	Relegation Group – 7th – Relegated
2003	Tier 2	Ykkönen (First Division)		Finnish FA (Suomen Palloliitto)	5th	
2004	Tier 2	Ykkönen (First Division)		Finnish FA (Suomen Palloliitto)	6th	
2005	Tier 2	Ykkönen (First Division)		Finnish FA (Suomen Palloliitto)	2nd	Play-offs – Promoted
2006	Tier 1	Veikkausliiga (Premier League)		Finnish FA (Suomen Palloliitto)	9th	
2007	Tier 1	Veikkausliiga (Premier League)		Finnish FA (Suomen Palloliitto)	10th	
2008	Tier 1	Veikkausliiga (Premier League)		Finnish FA (Suomen Palloliitto)	11th	
2009	Tier 1	Veikkausliiga (Premier League)		Finnish FA (Suomen Palloliitto)	8th	
2010	Tier 1	Veikkausliiga (Premier League)		Finnish FA (Suomen Palloliitto)	10th	
2011	Tier 1	Veikkausliiga (Premier League)		Finnish FA (Suomen Palloliitto)	9th	
2012	Tier 1	Veikkausliiga (Premier League)		Finnish FA (Suomen Palloliitto)	8th	
2013	Tier 1	Veikkausliiga (Premier League)		Finnish FA (Suomen Palloliitto)	3rd	UEFA Europa League First qualifying round
2014	Tier 1	Veikkausliiga (Premier League)		Finnish FA (Suomen Palloliitto)	4th	UEFA Europa League First qualifying round
2015	Tier 1	Veikkausliiga (Premier League)		Finnish FA (Suomen Palloliitto)	10th	
2016	Tier 1	Veikkausliiga (Premier League)		Finnish FA (Suomen Palloliitto)	4th	UEFA Europa League First qualifying round
2017	Tier 1	Veikkausliiga (Premier League)		Finnish FA (Suomen Palloliitto)	8th	
2018	Tier 1	Veikkausliiga (Premier League)		Finnish FA (Suomen Palloliitto)	6th	
2019	Tier 1	Veikkausliiga (Premier League)		Finnish FA (Suomen Palloliitto)	12th	Relegated
2020	Tier 2	Ykkönen (First Division)		Finnish FA (Suomen Palloliitto)	6th	
2021	Tier 2	Ykkönen (First Division)		Finnish FA (Suomen Palloliitto)	1st	Promoted
2022	Tier 1	Veikkausliiga (Premier League)		Finnish FA (Suomen Palloliitto)	8th	
2023	Tier 1	Veikkausliiga (Premier League)		Finnish FA (Suomen Palloliitto)	3rd	
2024	Tier 1	Veikkausliiga (Premier League)		Finnish FA (Suomen Palloliitto)		

- 59 seasons in Veikkausliiga
- 21 seasons in Ykkönen
- 12 seasons in Kakkonen
- 1 season in Kolmonen

== Current squad ==
As of 24 August 2026

Note: Flags indicate national team as defined under FIFA eligibility rules; some limited exceptions apply. Players may hold more than one non-FIFA nationality.

No.	Pos.	Nation	Player
1	GK	FIN	Aleksi Piispa
2	DF	GBS	Lassana Mané
3	DF	GHA	Razak Simpson
5	DF	SWE	Vilmer Rönnberg
6	DF	NGR	Emmanuel Okereke
7	DF	SUR	Jayden Turfkruier
8	MF	STP	Paulo Lima
9	FW	DEN	Casper Holmelund
11	FW	FIN	Jonathan Muzinga
12	GK	FIN	Lucas Väyrynen
13	FW	NGR	Oluwaseyi Ogunniyi (on loan from Horsens)
14	MF	FIN	Simon Lindholm
17	MF	FIN	Dren Terrnava
18	DF	FIN	Adrian Arrakoski
19	DF	FIN	Martti Haukioja

No.	Pos.	Nation	Player
20	FW	KEN	Xavier Odhiambo (on loan from Landskrona)
21	DF	GHA	Arnold Adu-Boahen (on loan from Horsens)
22	GK	FIN	Eino Ehrnrooth
23	DF	FIN	Miika Niemi
24	DF	FIN	Yassin Daoussi
25	MF	FIN	Henri Salomaa
26	MF	FIN	Rasmus Forsbacka
27	DF	FIN	Kevin Kouassivi-Benissan
29	FW	MLI	Wilson Samaké (on loan from Bandırmaspor)
30	MF	FIN	Joonas Vahtera
31	FW	FIN	Alex Myntti
34	MF	FIN	Antti-Ville Räisänen
37	FW	FIN	Joona Somppi
41	GK	SLE	Mamadou Jalloh (on loan from Brøndby)

=== Out on loan ===
Note: Flags indicate national team as defined under FIFA eligibility rules; some limited exceptions apply. Players may hold more than one non-FIFA nationality.

No.	Pos.	Nation	Player
35	FW	FIN	Olavi Keturi (at Jippo until 31 December 2026)

== Management and boardroom ==
=== Management ===
As of 10 March 2024

Name	Role
(Finland) Jussi Nuorela	Head coach
(Finland) Henri Sillanpää	Assistant coach
(Finland) Kari Salmi	Fitness coach
(Finland) Vesa Kumpula	Goalkeeper coach
(Finland) Tommi Helminen	Video analyst
(Egypt) Loai Mohamed	Video analyst
(Finland) Veli Lampi	Team manager
(Finland) Jouko Jokinen	Team manager

=== Boardroom ===
As of 24 Septer 2024

Name	Role
(Finland) Timo Harri	Chairman
(Finland) Riku Asukas	Vice chairman
(Finland) Tommi Pikkarainen	Sporting director

== Coaches ==
- (Finland) Nuutti Lintamo (1945–46)
- (Finland) Heikki Kultti (1945–48)
- (Hungary) Géza Toldi (1948–49)
- (Finland) Tauno Koistinen (1950)
- (Finland) Jussi Sillanpää (1951)
- (Finland) Tauno Koistinen (1952–53)
- (Finland) Martti Häyhä (1954–58)
- (Finland) Ole Stolpe (1959)
- (Finland) Erkki Riihimäki (1960–62)
- (Finland) Niilo Kinnunen (1963)
- (Finland) Jussi Sillanpää (1964–68)
- (Socialist Federal Republic of Yugoslavia) Jovan Jevtić (1969–70)
- (Finland) Kari Dahlsten (1970–72)
- (Finland) Raimo Hudd (1973)
- (Finland) Eero Tuhkanen (1974–77)
- (Finland) Pekka Mäkelä (1978)
- (Finland) Erkki Myllyaho (1979)
- (Finland) Esa Virta (1980–82)
- (Finland) Raimo Hudd (1983)
- (Finland) Jarmo Meltoranta (1984)
- (Poland) Jerzy Wojtowicz (1985–87)
- (Finland) Jarmo Meltoranta (1988–89)
- (Finland) Markku Myötänen (1989–90)
- (Poland) Boguslaw Hajdas (1991–92)
- (Poland) Jerzy Wojtowicz (1993)
- (Poland) Bogusław Hajdas (1993–95)
- (Poland) Tomasz Arceusz (1995)
- (Finland) Heikki Suhonen (1995)
- (Finland) Hannu Touru (1996–98)
- (Sweden) Sören Cratz (1999)
- (Finland) Kimmo Lipponen (1999)
- (Finland) Jukka Ikäläinen (2000–01)
- (Finland) Keijo Paananen (2002)
- (England) Stephen Ward (2003–04)
- (Finland) Jari Pyykölä (1 January 2006 – 9 June 2007)
- (Finland) Mika Koivumäki (2007)
- (Finland) Janne Lindberg (18 June 2007 – 31 December 2007)
- (Finland) Tomi Kärkkäinen (1 January 2008 – 15 May 2009)
- (Finland) Petri Vuorinen (1 January 2009 – 15 May 2009)
- (Finland) Tommi Pikkarainen (2010–11)
- (Finland) Petri Vuorinen (10 January 2011 – 28 July 2011)
- (Finland) Olli Huttunen (1 January 2012 – 29 June 2015)
- (Finland) Petri Vuorinen (29 June 2015 – 8 July 2019)
- (Finland) Christian Sund (8 July 2019 – 31 December 2020)
- (Finland) Jukka Karjalainen (1 January 2021 – 17 June 2021)
- (Finland) Jussi Nuorela (18 June 2021–)
