= Sudet =

Finnish sports club

- Full name: Sudet
- Founded: 1912; 114 years ago
- Ground: Keskusurheilukenttä, Kouvola, Finland
- Capacity: 12,000
- Chairman: (Finland) Tuomas Liukko
- Head Coach: (Finland) Janne Lindberg
- Coach: (Finland) Jukka Lindström (Finland) Jari Lindberg (GK)
- League: Kakkonen
- 2009: 3rd – Kolmonen (South-East Finland)
Home colours

Sudet ("Wolves" in English) is a sports club from Kouvola, Finland, playing bandy and association football. The club was formed in 1912 and was based firstly in Viipuri (Vyborg), then in Helsinki, before finally moving to Kouvola.

Sudet formerly played in the Bandyliiga, the top bandy league in Finland, and has become Finnish champions many times. As of 2014, the club is the reigning national champion in women's bandy. Sudet currently plays football in the Kolmonen (Fourth Division) and their home ground is at the Keskusurheilukenttä, Kouvola.

Sudet side sport was ice hockey, which was transferred to KooKoo in 1965.

== History ==
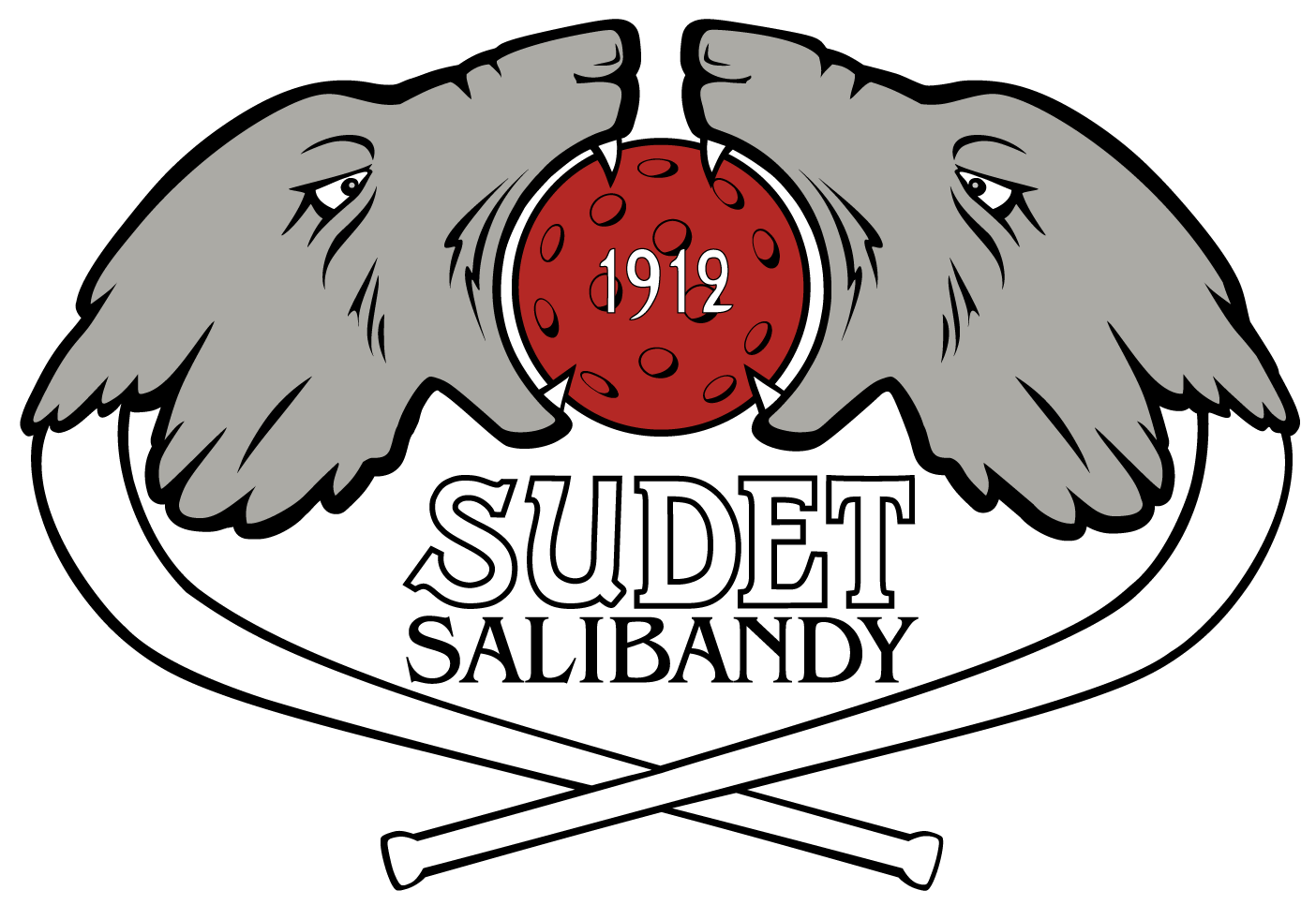
Sudet floorball logo

Sudet were originally established in Viipuri (Vyborg) on 13 December 1912 under the name Wiipurin Bandy & Jalkapalloseura (WB & JS). The name was changed in 1924 to Wiipurin Sudet. In 1940 the Winter War resulted in the club moving to Helsinki as the city of Viipuri fell into Soviet hands. From 1950 the name was changed to its current form, Sudet. In 1962 the club made its final move to Kouvola.

In the early decades of the twentieth century WB & JS were very successful at bandy winning their first Finnish Championship in 1914. The club won no fewer than six consecutive Finnish Championships and has won 14 in total as of 2014. In 2014, the women's bandy team of Sudet claimed the women's national championship for the first time.

Sudet also made great progress at football and reached the semi-finals of the Finnish Championship in 1924, 1925, 1928 and 1929. They were promoted to the new Mestaruussarja at the end of the 1930 season.

In total the club played 15 seasons in the Finnish Football Championship (Mestaruussarja) in 1931–38, 1940/41-46/47, 1948 and 1951. On 28 July 1940 Sudet won the Finnish Championship by beating TPS Turku 2–0 in the Final. The Mestaruussarja could not be played as a league in 1940 so a cup competition was held instead.

Sudet played 18 seasons in the Suomensarja (Finland League), the second tier of Finnish football in 1939, 1947/48, 1949–50, 1952–61 and 1963–66. They also have had two spells in the third tier, the Kakkonen (the Second Division), in 1981 and 1985–90.

Sudet's recent history has been less spectacular. After a period of inactivity in the 1990s the club was revived in 2001 following a cooperative venture with Kymen Salibandy and FC Kouvola. Sudet is now a strong club, which has benefited by an increase of around 300 in the number of members.

The club currently remains in the Kolmonen (Third Division) but their potential was demonstrated in the 2010 Finnish Cup when they battled their way through to the Sixth Round before going down 0–1 at home to FC Haka from the Veikkausliiga watched by 514 spectators.

The highest ever attendance for a Sudet match was in 1937 in Viipuri when 3,264 people attended the home game with Turun Palloseura.

== Divisional Movements since 1930 ==
– Sudet Viipuri until 1944
– Sudet Helsinki from 1945 to 1961
– Sudet Kouvola since 1962

Top Level (15 seasons): 1931–38, 1940/41-46/47, 1948, 1951
Second Level (18 seasons): 1939, 1947/48, 1949–50, 1952–61, 1963–66
Third Level (7 seasons): 1981, 1985–90

== Season to season ==
Season	Level	Division	Section	Administration	Position	Movements
1930	Tier 2	B-Sarja (Second Division)	Cup-format	Finnish FA (Suomen Pallolitto)	Final	Promoted
1931	Tier 1	A-Sarja (Premier League)		Finnish FA (Suomen Pallolitto)	6th	
1932	Tier 1	A-Sarja (Premier League)		Finnish FA (Suomen Pallolitto)	5th	
1933	Tier 1	A-Sarja (Premier League)		Finnish FA (Suomen Pallolitto)	3rd	
1934	Tier 1	A-Sarja (Premier League)		Finnish FA (Suomen Pallolitto)	4th	
1935	Tier 1	A-Sarja (Premier League)		Finnish FA (Suomen Pallolitto)	6th	
1936	Tier 1	Mestaruussarja (Premier League)		Finnish FA (Suomen Pallolitto)	4th	
1937	Tier 1	Mestaruussarja (Premier League)		Finnish FA (Suomen Pallolitto)	3rd	
1938	Tier 1	Mestaruussarja (Premier League)		Finnish FA (Suomen Pallolitto)	8th	Relegated
1939	Tier 2	Itä-Länsi-sarja (Second Division)	East League, South Group	Finnish FA (Suomen Pallolitto)	1st	Promotion Playoff - Promoted
1940-41	Tier 1	Mestaruussarja (Premier League)		Finnish FA (Suomen Pallolitto)	3rd	Home matches in Helsinki
1943-44	Tier 1	Mestaruussarja (Premier League)		Finnish FA (Suomen Pallolitto)	3rd	
1945	Tier 1	Mestaruussarja (Premier League)	Group A	Finnish FA (Suomen Pallolitto)	2nd	Sudet Helsinki
1945-46	Tier 1	Mestaruussarja (Premier League)		Finnish FA (Suomen Pallolitto)	6th	
1946-47	Tier 1	Mestaruussarja (Premier League)		Finnish FA (Suomen Pallolitto)	7th	Relegated
1947-48	Tier 2	Suomensarja (Second Division)	South Group	Finnish FA (Suomen Pallolitto)	2nd	Promotion Group 2nd - Promoted
1948	Tier 1	Mestaruussarja (Premier League)		Finnish FA (Suomen Pallolitto)	12th	Relegated
1949	Tier 2	Suomensarja (Second Division)	East Group	Finnish FA (Suomen Pallolitto)	4th	
1950	Tier 2	Suomensarja (Second Division)	East Group	Finnish FA (Suomen Pallolitto)	1st	Promoted
1951	Tier 1	Mestaruussarja (Premier League)		Finnish FA (Suomen Pallolitto)	9th	Relegated
1952	Tier 2	Suomensarja (Second Division)	East Group	Finnish FA (Suomen Pallolitto)	7th	
1953	Tier 2	Suomensarja (Second Division)	East Group	Finnish FA (Suomen Pallolitto)	7th	
1954	Tier 2	Suomensarja (Second Division)	East Group	Finnish FA (Suomen Pallolitto)	7th	
1955	Tier 2	Suomensarja (Second Division)	East Group	Finnish FA (Suomen Pallolitto)	6th	
1956	Tier 2	Suomensarja (Second Division)	East Group	Finnish FA (Suomen Pallolitto)	7th	
1957	Tier 2	Suomensarja (Second Division)	East Group	Finnish FA (Suomen Pallolitto)	6th	
1958	Tier 2	Suomensarja (Second Division)	South Group	Finnish FA (Suomen Pallolitto)	4th	
1959	Tier 2	Suomensarja (Second Division)	South Group	Finnish FA (Suomen Pallolitto)	4th	
1960	Tier 2	Suomensarja (Second Division)	South Group	Finnish FA (Suomen Pallolitto)	7th	
1961	Tier 2	Suomensarja (Second Division)	East Group	Finnish FA (Suomen Pallolitto)	12th	Relegated
1962	Tier 3	Maakuntasarja (Third Division)	Group 4	Finnish FA (Suomen Pallolitto)	1st	First season in Kouvola - Promoted
1963	Tier 2	Suomensarja (Second Division)	East Group	Finnish FA (Suomen Pallolitto)	3rd	
1964	Tier 2	Suomensarja (Second Division)	East Group	Finnish FA (Suomen Pallolitto)	2nd	
1965	Tier 2	Suomensarja (Second Division)	East Group	Finnish FA (Suomen Pallolitto)	8th	
1966	Tier 2	Suomensarja (Second Division)	East Group	Finnish FA (Suomen Pallolitto)	11th	Relegated
1967	Tier 3	Maakuntasarja (Third Division)	Group 6	Finnish FA (Suomen Pallolitto)	4th	
1968	Tier 3	Maakuntasarja (Third Division)	Group 5	Finnish FA (Suomen Pallolitto)	4th	
1969	Tier 3	Maakuntasarja (Third Division)	Group 5	Finnish FA (Suomen Pallolitto)	3rd	
1970	Tier 3	III Divisioona (Third Division)	Group 5	Finnish FA (Suomen Pallolitto)	4th	
1971	Tier 3	III Divisioona (Third Division)	Group 4	Finnish FA (Suomen Pallolitto)	7th	
1972	Tier 3	III Divisioona (Third Division)	Group 6	Finnish FA (Suomen Pallolitto)	8th	
1973	Tier 4	III Divisioona (Third Division)	Group 6	Finnish FA (Suomen Pallolitto)	5th	
1974	Tier 4	III Divisioona (Third Division)	Group 6	Finnish FA (Suomen Pallolitto)	8th	Relegation Playoff - Relegated
1975	Tier 5	IV Divisioona (Fourth Division)	Group 10	Finnish FA (Suomen Pallolitto)	5th	
1976	Tier 5	IV Divisioona (Fourth Division)	Group 11	Finnish FA (Suomen Pallolitto)	1st	Promoted
1977	Tier 4	III Divisioona (Third Division)	Group 6	Finnish FA (Suomen Pallolitto)	6th	
1978	Tier 4	III Divisioona (Third Division)	Group 6	Finnish FA (Suomen Pallolitto)	5th	
1979	Tier 4	III Divisioona (Third Division)	Group 6	Finnish FA (Suomen Pallolitto)	3rd	
1980	Tier 4	III Divisioona (Third Division)	Group 6	Finnish FA (Suomen Pallolitto)	1st	Promotion Playoff - Promoted
1981	Tier 3	II Divisioona (Second Division)	East Group	Finnish FA (Suomen Pallolitto)	11th	Relegated
1982	Tier 4	III Divisioona (Third Division)	Group 6	Finnish FA (Suomen Pallolitto)	6th	
1983	Tier 4	III Divisioona (Third Division)	Group 6	Finnish FA (Suomen Pallolitto)	3rd	
1984	Tier 4	III Divisioona (Third Division)	Group 6	Finnish FA (Suomen Pallolitto)	1st	Promotion Playoff - Promoted
1985	Tier 3	II Divisioona (Second Division)	East Group	Finnish FA (Suomen Pallolitto)	3rd	
1986	Tier 3	II Divisioona (Second Division)	East Group	Finnish FA (Suomen Pallolitto)	3rd	
1987	Tier 3	II Divisioona (Second Division)	East Group	Finnish FA (Suomen Pallolitto)	5th	
1988	Tier 3	II Divisioona (Second Division)	East Group	Finnish FA (Suomen Pallolitto)	7th	
1989	Tier 3	II Divisioona (Second Division)	East Group	Finnish FA (Suomen Pallolitto)	9th	
1990	Tier 3	II Divisioona (Second Division)	East Group	Finnish FA (Suomen Pallolitto)	12th	Relegated
1991-2003		Disbanded				
2004	Tier 6	Vitonen (Fifth Division)	West Section	South-East Finland (SPL Kaakkois-Suomi)	5th	
2005	Tier 6	Vitonen (Fifth Division)	West Section	South-East Finland (SPL Kaakkois-Suomi)	4th	
2006	Tier 6	Vitonen (Fifth Division)	West Section	South-East Finland (SPL Kaakkois-Suomi)	6th	
2007		Withdrew from Vitonen				
2008	Tier 4	Kolmonen (Third Division)	South-East Finland	South-East Finland (SPL Kaakkois-Suomi)	4th	
2009	Tier 4	Kolmonen (Third Division)	South-East Finland	South-East Finland (SPL Kaakkois-Suomi)	3rd	
2010	Tier 4	Kolmonen (Third Division)	South-East Finland	South-East Finland (SPL Kaakkois-Suomi)	4th	
2011	Tier 3	Kakkonen (Second Division)	Group A	Finnish FA (Suomen Palloliitto)	12th	Relegated
2012	Tier 4	Kolmonen (Third Division)	South-East Finland	South-East Finland (SPL Kaakkois-Suomi)	1st	Promoted
2013	Tier 3	Kakkonen (Second Division)	Eastern Group	Finnish FA (Suomen Palloliitto)	9th	Relegated
2014	Tier 4	Kolmonen (Third Division)	South-East Finland	South-East Finland (SPL Kaakkois-Suomi)	1st	Promoted
2015	Tier 3	Kakkonen (Second Division)	Eastern Group	Finnish FA (Suomen Palloliitto)	5th	
2016	Tier 3	Kakkonen (Second Division)	Group A	Finnish FA (Suomen Palloliitto)	9th	
2017	Tier 3	Kakkonen (Second Division)	Group A	Finnish FA (Suomen Palloliitto)	10th	Relegated
2018	Tier 4	Kolmonen (Third Division)	South-East Finland	South-East Finland (SPL Kaakkois-Suomi)	1st	Promoted
2019	Tier 3	Kakkonen (Second Division)	Group A	Finnish FA (Suomen Palloliitto)	12th	Relegated
2020	Tier 4	Kolmonen (Third Division)	East: Group B	South-East Finland (SPL Kaakkois-Suomi)		

- 15 seasons in Mestaruussarja
- 19 seasons in Suomensarja
- 19 seasons in Kakkonen
- 17 seasons in Kolmonen
- 2 seasons in IV Divisioona
- 3 seasons in Vitonen

== Club structure ==
Sudet run 3 men's teams, 1 ladies team, 12 boys teams and 7 girls teams. In addition the FC Arosudet and FC Hukat clubs form part of the Sudet structure. The club also run a football school for youngsters.

== 2010 season ==
Sudet Men's Team are competing in the Kolmonen (Third Division) administered by the Kaakkois-Suomi SPL. This is the fourth highest tier in the Finnish football system. In 2009 STPS finished in third place in the Kolmonen.

Sudet/2 and Sudet Pure Amis are participating in the Kutonen (Sixth Division) administered by the Kaakkois-Suomi SPL. They are both new teams.

== Current squad 2016 ==
Note: Flags indicate national team as defined under FIFA eligibility rules; some limited exceptions apply. Players may hold more than one non-FIFA nationality.

No.	Pos.	Nation	Player
2	DF	FIN	Benjamin Niveri
4	DF	FIN	Juho Hasu
5	DF	FIN	Antti Kauppila
6	MF	FIN	Henri Järvinen
7	MF	FIN	Samuel Lindeman
9	MF	FIN	Rico Ryöpäs
11	MF	FIN	Henrik Hellstén
12	GK	FIN	Vilbert Töttö
14	DF	FIN	Henri Niemi
16	FW	FIN	Joona Martikainen
17	MF	FIN	Matias Juntunen
18	MF	FIN	Oskari Nurminen

No.	Pos.	Nation	Player
19	FW	FIN	Niko Nakari
21	GK	FIN	Simo Majander
23	DF	FIN	Vertti Vuorinen
24	GK	FIN	Niko Huusko
25	FW	FIN	Jari Hassel
26	MF	FIN	Rami Nieminen
28	MF	FIN	Riku Venäläinen
29	MF	FIN	Niki Patjas
30	FW	FIN	Paavo Kujala
31	MF	FIN	Joakim Lindberg
40	DF	FIN	Ville Majander
41	MF	FIN	Simo Tura

== References and sources ==
- Official Website
- Finnish Wikipedia
- Suomen Cup
- Suomen Cup
