= Football in Finland =

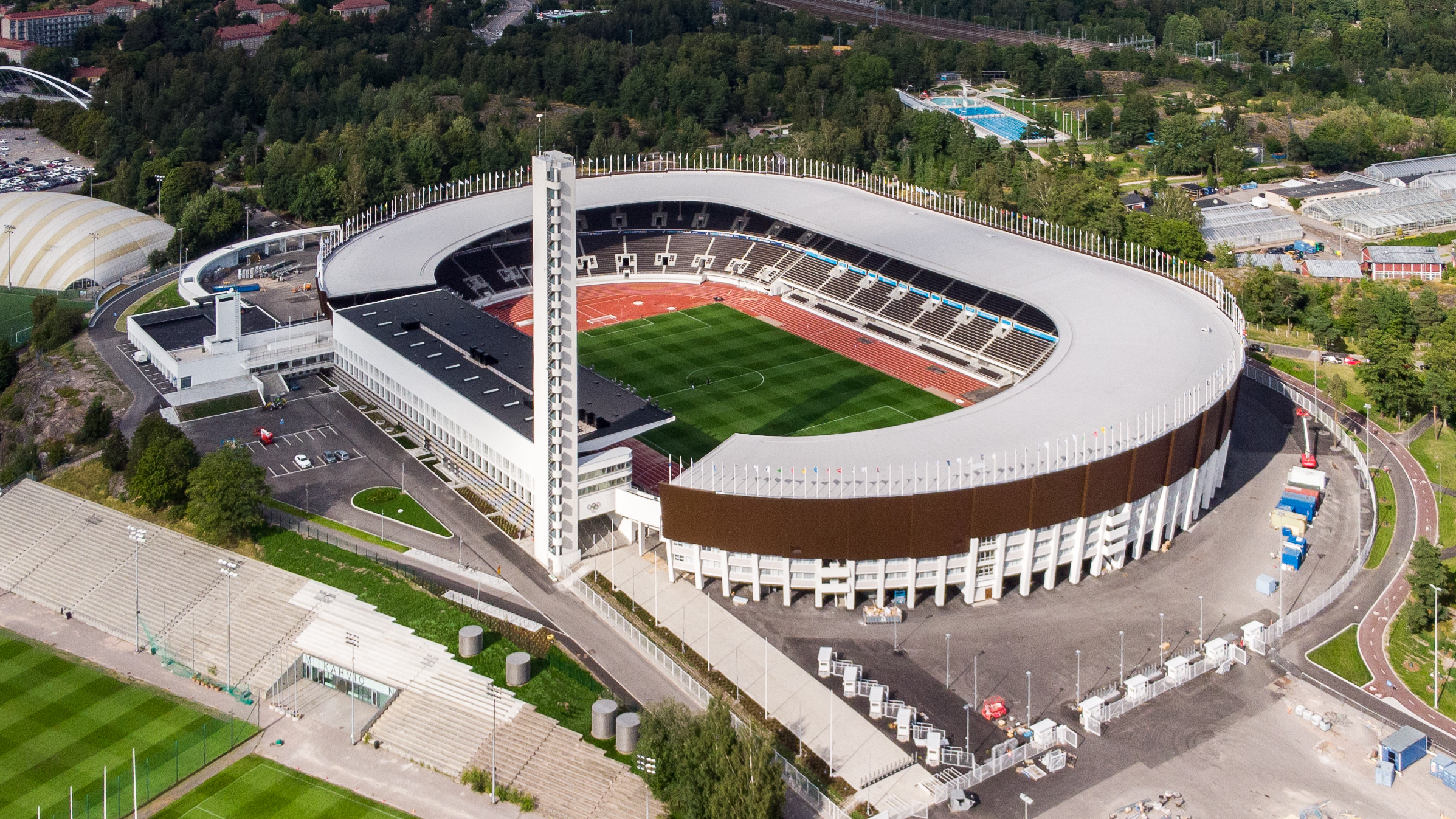
- Helsinki Olympic Stadium, the national stadium of Finland
- Country: Finland
- Governing body: Football Association of Finland (Finnish: Suomen Palloliitto)
- National teams: Men's national team Women's national team
- Nicknames: Huuhkajat; Helmarit
- First played: at least 1890s (men); at least 1970s
- Registered players: 1907

National competitions
- FIFA World Cup (m); FIFA Women's World Cup (w); UEFA European Championship (m); UEFA Women's Championship (w); UEFA Nations League (m); Nordic Football Championship (m); Women's Nordic Football Championship (w)

Club competitions
- League: Tier 1: Veikkausliiga (m), Kansallinen Liiga (w); Tier 2: Ykkösliiga (m), Naisten Ykkönen (w); Tier 3: Ykkönen (m), Naisten Kakkonen (w); Tier 4: Kakkonen (m), Naisten Kolmonen (w); Tier 5: Kolmonen (m), Naisten Nelonen (w); Tier 6: Nelonen (m), Naisten Vitonen (w); Tier 7: Vitonen (m); Tier 8: Kutonen (m); Tier 9: Seiska (m); Cups: Finnish Cup (m); Finnish Women's Cup (w)

International competitions
- FIFA Club World Cup (m); UEFA Champions League (m); UEFA Women's Champions League (w); UEFA Europa League (m); UEFA Europa Conference League (m); UEFA Super Cup (m)

Football in Finland (Finnish: jalkapallo) is not, or at least has traditionally not been, the most popular spectator sport, which is in contrast to most European countries; it falls behind ice hockey, which enjoys a huge amount of popularity in the country. Football tops ice hockey in the number of registered players (115,000 vs. 60,000) and as a popular hobby (160,000 vs. 90,000 among adults and 230,000 vs. 105,000 among youths). It is the most popular hobby among 3-18 year olds, whereas ice hockey is 9th. Around 2 million people in Finland, or 45% of the population, are considered football fans.

Football's standing is constantly increasing, especially among girls and women, where the yearly growth rate has lately been over 10 percent. In season 2006–07 19.9 percent of registered players were female. The Football Association of Finland (Finnish: Suomen Palloliitto) has approximately one thousand member clubs. According to a Gallup poll, nearly 400,000 people include football among their hobbies.

== History ==
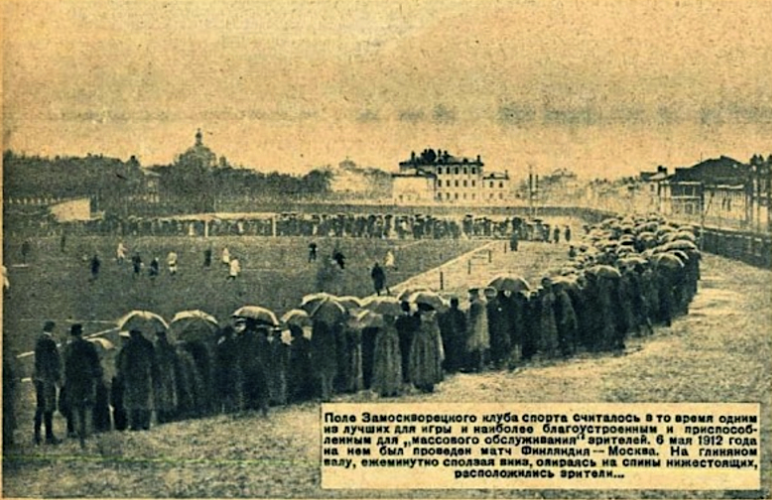
A match between Finland and Moscow in Moscow on 6 May 1912

Due to a number of names and variants of football played in the late 19th century, it is unclear when exactly football arrived in Finland. In 1906, a Finnish club, Unitas, traveled to Saint Petersburg for a friendly match. To regulate the game, the Football Association of Finland was founded in 1907 and it joined FIFA the following year.

A national men's league started in 1908 and is played out since. The men's national team played its first match in 1911 and soon played at the Olympics 1912, finishing fourth.

A national women's league started as late as 1971. The women's national team played its first match in 1973 and entered the first edition of the Nordic Football Championship a year later, finishing third and thus last.

== Domestic club competitions ==
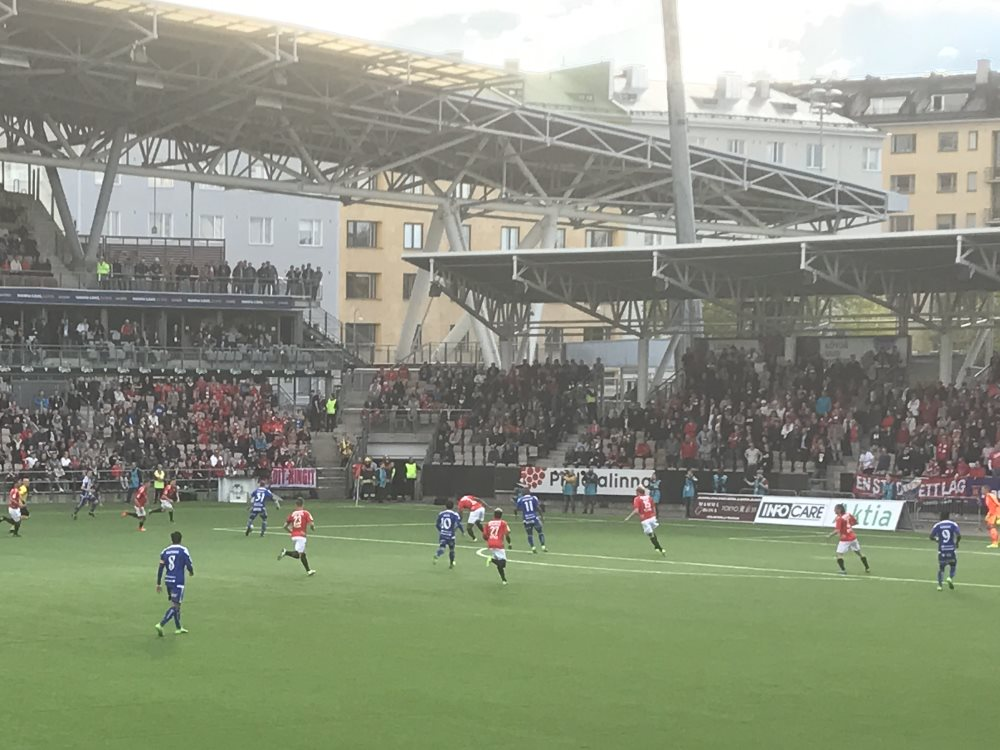
Stadin derby HIFK–HJK 23 May 2017

The highest division in Finnish men's football is the Veikkausliiga, comprising 12 professional football teams. Below that is a league system maintained by the Finnish Football Association, with Ykkönen, or First Division, as the second highest division, with 10 teams. Beneath Ykkönen, each division is divided into 'groups' based on the location of the clubs. For instance, the Second Division, or Kakkonen, has 40 teams divided into four regional groups, each of 10 teams.

The highest division in Finnish women's football is the Kansallinen Liiga, comprising 10 semi-professional and amateur teams. Below that, five amateur divisions exist, with Kansallinen Ykkönen being the second national division.

The Finnish Cup and Finnish Women's Cup are Finland's national cup competitions, open to all member clubs of the Finnish Football Association. In the 2009 season, 356 clubs signed up to take part in the men's competition alone.

All Finnish domestic football competitions take place in the spring, summer and autumn, due to weather conditions. Similar systems are used in the other Nordic countries as well, except for Denmark which had that system in the past.

== National teams ==
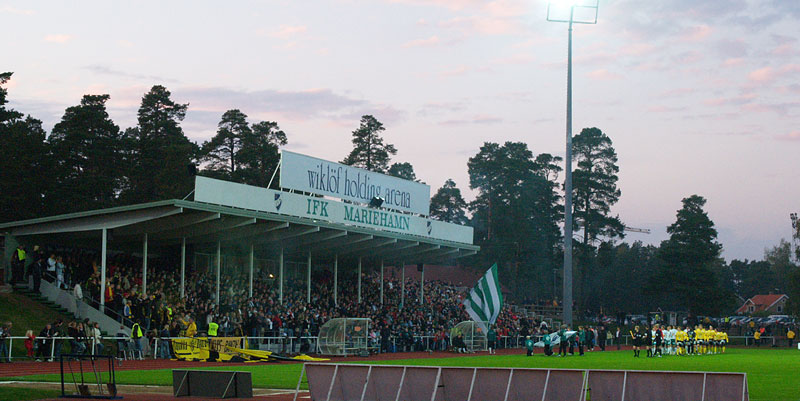
IFK Mariehamn home stadium (Wiklof Holding Arena)

The Finland national team played its first international match in 1911 against Sweden. Finland was still then a Grand Duchy part of the Russian Empire, and became independent in 1917. Finland have played in a few Olympic Games, finishing fourth in 1912, but have so far never qualified for the FIFA World Cup. Finland qualified to UEFA European Championship for the first time in 2020.

The Football Association of Finland also organizes national under-19 and under-21 teams.

The Finland women's national football team made their competitive debut in the 1974 Women's Nordic Football Championship and entered their first UEFA competition a decade later, playing in the 1984 European Competition for Women's Football qualification. To date, their most successful competition has been UEFA Women's Euro 2005, where they reached the semi-finals stage. In 2024, they won their first international competition, the invitational 2024 Pinatar Cup in Spain.

== Åland Islands ==
Since 1943 the Åland Football Association (ÅFA) has organized football in Åland. The ÅFA is a district association of the Football Association of Finland. However, the Åland Islands fields independent men's and women's national teams, principally competing in the Island Games.

== Football stadiums in Finland ==
Stadiums with a capacity of 10,000 or higher are included.

| # | Photo | Stadium | Capacity | City | Home team | Founding year | Cite |
|---|---|---|---|---|---|---|---|
| 1 | | Helsinki Olympic Stadium | 36,200 | Helsinki | Finland | 1938 | |
| 2 | | Tampere Stadium (Ratina Stadion) | 16,800 | Tampere | Finland, Ilves | 1966 | |
| 3 | | Lahden Stadion | 14,465 | Lahti | FC Lahti | 1981 | |
| 4 | | Paavo Nurmi Stadium | 13,000 | Turku | | 1893 | |
| 5 | | Porin Stadion | 12,300 | Pori | FC Jazz | 1966 | |
| 6 | | Bolt Arena | 10,770 | Helsinki | HJK, HIFK, Finland | 2000 | |

== Most successful clubs overall ==
As of 16 November 2026

The table counts Finnish national championships and senior national cup titles in men's and women's football. The championship columns include titles won under earlier competition formats and names.

| Club | Men's titles | | | Women's titles | | | | Combined total |
| Club | Finnish championship | Suomen Cup | Liigacup | Finnish championship | Naisten Suomen Cup | Naisten Liigacup | Kansallinen Cup | Combined total |
|---|---|---|---|---|---|---|---|---|
| HJK | 33 | 15 | 6 | 26 | 20 | 4 | 2 | 106 |
| Haka | 9 | 12 | 1 | 0 | 0 | 0 | 0 | 22 |
| KuPS | 8 | 5 | 1 | 3 | 1 | 0 | 1 | 19 |
| Honka | 0 | 1 | 3 | 4 | 3 | 2 | 0 | 13 |
| TPS | 8 | 3 | 1 | 1 | 0 | 0 | 0 | 13 |
| PK-35 Vantaa | 0 | 0 | 0 | 7 | 4 | 0 | 0 | 11 |
| HPS | 9 | 1 | 0 | 0 | 0 | 0 | 0 | 10 |
| Reipas Lahti | 3 | 7 | 0 | 0 | 0 | 0 | 0 | 10 |
| Inter Turku | 2 | 3 | 4 | 0 | 0 | 0 | 0 | 9 |
| HIFK | 7 | 0 | 0 | 0 | 0 | 0 | 0 | 7 |
| Kuusysi | 5 | 2 | 0 | 0 | 0 | 0 | 0 | 7 |
| Åland United | 0 | 0 | 0 | 3 | 3 | 0 | 0 | 6 |
| KTP | 2 | 4 | 0 | 0 | 0 | 0 | 0 | 6 |
| FC United (Pietarsaari) | 0 | 0 | 0 | 2 | 3 | 0 | 0 | 5 |
| Ilves | 1 | 4 | 0 | 0 | 0 | 0 | 0 | 5 |
| Tampere United | 3 | 1 | 1 | 0 | 0 | 0 | 0 | 5 |
| ÅIFK | 3 | 1 | 0 | 0 | 0 | 0 | 0 | 4 |
| Helsinki United | 0 | 0 | 0 | 3 | 1 | 0 | 0 | 4 |
| Kiffen | 4 | 0 | 0 | 0 | 0 | 0 | 0 | 4 |
| MPS | 0 | 0 | 0 | 2 | 2 | 0 | 0 | 4 |
| MyPa | 1 | 3 | 0 | 0 | 0 | 0 | 0 | 4 |
| VPS | 2 | 0 | 2 | 0 | 0 | 0 | 0 | 4 |
| FC Lahti | 0 | 0 | 3 | 0 | 0 | 0 | 0 | 3 |
| Herttoniemen Toverit | 0 | 0 | 0 | 0 | 3 | 0 | 0 | 3 |
| Kemin Into | 0 | 0 | 0 | 2 | 1 | 0 | 0 | 3 |
| Puotinkylän Valtti | 0 | 0 | 0 | 2 | 1 | 0 | 0 | 3 |
| SJK | 1 | 1 | 1 | 0 | 0 | 0 | 0 | 3 |
| VIFK | 3 | 0 | 0 | 0 | 0 | 0 | 0 | 3 |
| Allianssi | 0 | 0 | 2 | 0 | 0 | 0 | 0 | 2 |
| FC Jazz | 2 | 0 | 0 | 0 | 0 | 0 | 0 | 2 |
| FC Kontu | 0 | 0 | 0 | 1 | 1 | 0 | 0 | 2 |
| IFK Mariehamn | 1 | 1 | 0 | 0 | 0 | 0 | 0 | 2 |
| MP | 0 | 2 | 0 | 0 | 0 | 0 | 0 | 2 |
| OPS | 2 | 0 | 0 | 0 | 0 | 0 | 0 | 2 |
| RoPS | 0 | 2 | 0 | 0 | 0 | 0 | 0 | 2 |
| Turun Pyrkivä | 1 | 0 | 0 | 0 | 1 | 0 | 0 | 2 |
| Atlantis | 0 | 1 | 0 | 0 | 0 | 0 | 0 | 1 |
| Drott | 0 | 1 | 0 | 0 | 0 | 0 | 0 | 1 |
| HT | 1 | 0 | 0 | 0 | 0 | 0 | 0 | 1 |
| Ilves-Kissat | 1 | 0 | 0 | 0 | 0 | 0 | 0 | 1 |
| Jokerit | 0 | 1 | 0 | 0 | 0 | 0 | 0 | 1 |
| KPV | 1 | 0 | 0 | 0 | 0 | 0 | 0 | 1 |
| Pallo-Pojat | 0 | 1 | 0 | 0 | 0 | 0 | 0 | 1 |
| Puistolan Urheilijat | 0 | 0 | 0 | 0 | 1 | 0 | 0 | 1 |
| PUS | 1 | 0 | 0 | 0 | 0 | 0 | 0 | 1 |
| Sudet | 1 | 0 | 0 | 0 | 0 | 0 | 0 | 1 |
| TPV | 1 | 0 | 0 | 0 | 0 | 0 | 0 | 1 |
| Unitas | 1 | 0 | 0 | 0 | 0 | 0 | 0 | 1 |

- Bold figures mark the highest club total in each column. Italics indicate a discontinued competition.
- The Helsinki United row includes the championships won as Kaunis Nainen Futis in 1985 and PP-Futis in 1989.

== Attendances ==
The average attendance per top-flight football league season and the club with the highest average attendance:

| Season | League average | Best club | Best club average |
|---|---|---|---|
| 2025 | 3,144 | HJK | 6,223 |
| 2024 | 2,958 | HJK | 6,361 |
| 2023 | 2,706 | HJK | 5,631 |
| 2022 | 1,894 | HJK | 4,002 |
| 2021 | — | — | — |
| 2020 | 1,594 | SJK | 2,172 |
| 2019 | 2,620 | HJK | 5,007 |
| 2018 | 2,308 | HJK | 3,779 |
| 2017 | 2,476 | HJK | 4,779 |
| 2016 | 2,550 | HJK | 5,101 |
| 2015 | 2,574 | HJK | 5,281 |
| 2014 | 2,046 | HJK | 4,017 |
| 2013 | 2,287 | HJK | 5,098 |
| 2012 | 2,037 | HJK | 3,758 |
| 2011 | 2,159 | HJK | 3,610 |
| 2010 | 2,225 | TPS | 3,658 |
| 2009 | 2,389 | TPS | 4,904 |
| 2008 | 2,636 | HJK | 4,516 |
| 2007 | 2,976 | TPS | 5,294 |
| 2006 | 2,909 | HJK | 5,580 |
| 2005 | 2,695 | HJK | 4,684 |
| 2004 | 2,614 | TPS | 3,822 |
| 2003 | 2,351 | HJK | 3,646 |
| 2002 | 1,933 | Tampere | 3,202 |
| 2001 | 2,234 | HJK | 3,818 |
| 2000 | 2,152 | HJK | 3,976 |
| 1999 | 1,943 | KTP | 3,105 |
| 1998 | 2,110 | HJK | 3,460 |
| 1997 | 2,045 | VPS | 3,893 |
| 1996 | 2,298 | HJK | 4,159 |
| 1995 | 2,161 | HJK | 3,418 |
| 1994 | 1,886 | HJK | 3,224 |
| 1993 | 2,367 | Jazz | 4,065 |
| 1992 | 1,990 | HJK | 3,250 |
| 1991 | 1,902 | HJK | 3,493 |
| 1990 | 2,322 | HJK | 4,673 |
| 1989 | 2,350 | HJK | 5,034 |
| 1988 | 2,006 | HJK | 4,033 |
| 1987 | 2,094 | HJK | 5,106 |
| 1986 | 2,364 | HJK | 6,770 |
| 1985 | 2,559 | HJK | 6,789 |
| 1984 | 2,317 | HJK | 5,049 |
| 1983 | 1,934 | Tampere | 4,069 |
| 1982 | 1,852 | HJK | 3,001 |
| 1981 | 2,361 | KTP | 3,473 |
| 1980 | 2,060 | KTP | 2,980 |
| 1979 | 2,114 | HJK | 3,889 |
| 1978 | 1,412 | HJK | 2,757 |
| 1977 | 1,924 | KuPS | 2,935 |
| 1976 | 1,948 | HJK | 2,886 |
| 1975 | 2,533 | HJK | 3,489 |
| 1974 | 2,405 | HJK | 3,481 |
| 1973 | 2,368 | HJK | 3,781 |
| 1972 | 2,403 | TPS | 3,611 |
| 1971 | 2,747 | Reipas | 3,980 |
| 1970 | 2,444 | HJK | 5,177 |
| 1969 | 2,995 | HJK | 8,058 |
| 1968 | 2,946 | HJK | 6,271 |
| 1967 | 3,071 | HJK | 7,197 |
| 1966 | 2,958 | HJK | 7,150 |
| 1965 | 2,615 | HJK | 7,381 |
| 1964 | 2,330 | HJK | 3,952 |
| 1963 | 2,662 | Åbo | 4,007 |
| 1962 | 2,603 | TPS | 4,366 |
| 1961 | 2,603 | TPS | 4,511 |
| 1960 | 1,989 | TPS | 4,019 |
| 1959 | 2,482 | HIFK | 3,920 |
