= SPL Saimaan piiri =

Suomen Palloliiton Saimaan piiri
- Abbreviation: SPL Saimaa
- Formation: 1924
- Dissolved: 1994
- Purpose: District Football Association
- Headquarters: Viipuri (1924–1940); Lappeenranta (1940–1994)

The Suomen Palloliiton Saimaan piiri (SPL Saimaa district) was a district organisation of the Football Association of Finland operating from 1924 to 1994. Until the Second World War the district was known as the Suomen Palloliiton Viipurin piiri (SPL Viipuri district). It administered football and bandy initially in and around Viipuri, later expanding to cover the southern part of the historical Finnish Karelia, and ultimately in the Lake Saimaa area. Currently it's part of the Suomen Palloliiton Kaakkois-Suomen piiri.

== History ==
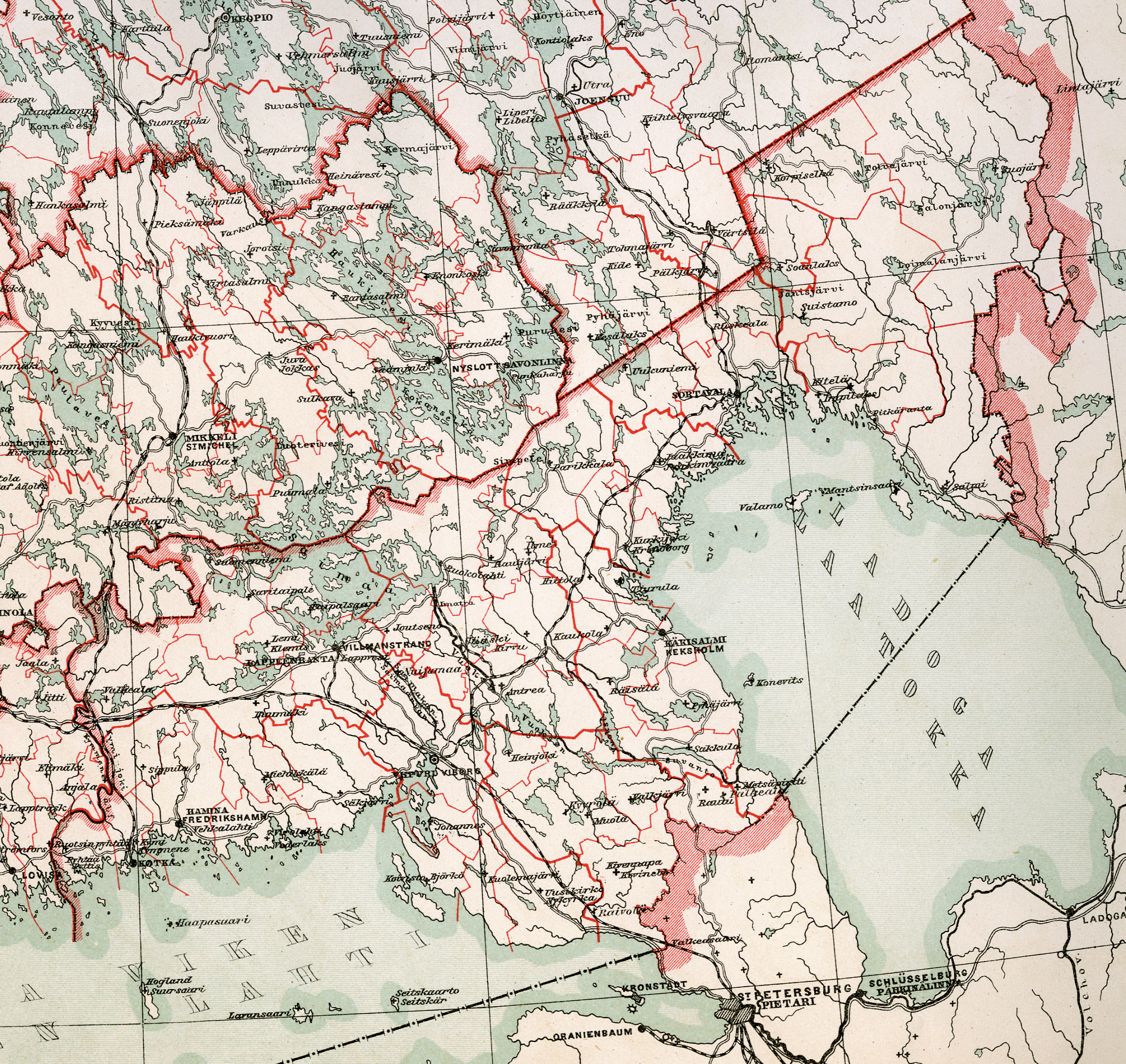
The SPL Viipuri district covered the Viipuri province

The district was founded by Sudet, Reipas and IFK in early 1924 as Suomen Palloliiton Viipurin piiri. It was based in Viipuri, a major city in the Karelian Isthmus, and covered the southern part of the historical Finnish Karelia. The exact foundation date is unknown, but the Football Association accepted the district's membership on April 19. It was the association's third district after Helsinki and Vaasa which had been established in January 1924. In its early years the district included only clubs from Viipuri, and for example clubs from Lappeenranta and the Vuoksi Valley joined in the 1930s. Clubs from Sortavala and Joensuu in northern Karelia founded their own district in 1930.

By the time the district was founded Viipuri already had strong ball game traditions as Sudet (originally called Wiipurin Bandy- ja Jalkapalloseura), a specialized bandy and football club, had won seven Finnish bandy championships in addition to reaching the final another three times. Also IFK and SLU had reached the final. In football Reipas had reached the championship final four times. Back then the championships were decided in cup tournaments; a league format was adopted in football in 1930 and in bandy in 1931. Another major club from Viipuri was Viipurin Palloseura (ViPS) which was founded in 1928 by younger members of Sudet fed up playing in the reserves as well as members of the multi-sports clubs Reipas and IFK. In the following years the new club challenged Sudet especially in bandy and won the Finnish championship in 1931 and 1936. Sudet still remained the dominant club and after the founding of the district won another seven championships, the last of which came in 1933. Other areas of the district showed progress as well with Ylä-Vuoksen Palloseura (YVPS) from Enso finishing second in 1939. In football Reipas reached the final again in 1927 and Sudet finished third in 1933 and 1937.

The Viipuri district included 15 clubs in 1933, and a peak of 23 clubs was reached in 1936. In terms of clubs and registered teams and players it was the Football Association's second biggest district after Helsinki. Worth noting is that several trade union clubs weren't members of the Football Association but the Workers' Sports Federation which organized its own competitions. Talikkalan Toverit from Viipuri won the Workers' Sports Federation football championship in 1931 and 1933 and the bandy championship in 1930, 1932 and 1935. Another successful Workers' Sports Federation ball club from Viipuri was Sorvalin Veikot whose best achievement was reaching the bandy final in 1933, 1938 and 1939.

The Winter War between Finland and the Soviet Union broke out in November 1939. When the Moscow Peace Treaty was signed in March 1940, Viipuri was lost and only a stub of the district's region and four clubs, Simpeleen Urheilijat (SiU) from Simpele, YVPS, Etelä-Saimaan Kisa (ESK) from Lauritsala and Lappeenrannan Urheilu-Miehet (LUM) from Lappeenranta, were left. Because of this the district moved its headquarters to Lappeenranta, where the first general assembly was held in September 1940. In 1942 the assembly was held in Imatra, and in 1943 the Finnish advances in the Continuation War permitted the district to briefly return to Viipuri. Ultimately, when the war ended in September 1944, the borders drawn in 1940 were retained and the district relocated back to Lappeenranta.

Several Viipuri-based clubs found home elsewhere in Finland and continue to operate until this day. Sudet moved to Helsinki in 1940 and to Kouvola in 1962. The evacuee club, who merged with ViPS, enjoyed some success in football during the wars and even won its first and only Finnish championship in the sport in 1940, but later on the club hasn't managed to reach the glory of the Viipuri years. Reipas went to Lahti where it won three championships in football in 1963, 1967 and 1970. Younger clubs of Viipuri included Ilves, who moved to Tampere and became known as Tampere-Viipurin Ilves-Kissat due to the city already having a club called Ilves, and Viipurin Pallokerho, who moved to Helsinki and is now known as Pallokerho-35. Ilves-Kissat won the championship in football in 1950.

The district's name was changed to Suomen Palloliiton Saimaan piiri in 1945, and at the same occasion Savonlinna joined from the Savo district. Mikkeli followed suit in 1952. Another boost in membership took place in 1955 when the Workers' Sports Federation clubs became members of the Football Association and its districts. This completed the "marriage" which had started in 1948 with the Workers' Sports Federation clubs joining the Football Association competitions. When the district celebrated its 50-year anniversary in 1974 it had 46 member clubs.

In the post-war era the district's footballing focus shifted to Mikkeli where Mikkelin Pallo-Kissat (MiPK) and Mikkelin Palloilijat (MP) played several seasons in the national top-flight. MP finished second in 1970, 1972 and 1991, third in 1990, and won the Finnish Cup in 1970 and 1971. Clubs from the other major cities of Lappeenranta, Imatra and Savonlinna have never reached the top-flight in football. In bandy LUM won the championship in 1949 and Veiterä, LUM's successor in the sport, in 1951, 1955 and 1957, in addition to several second and third-place finishes. MP managed a row of first, second and third-place finishes in 1968, 1969 and 1970, respectively, and Lappeenrannan Pallo (LaPa) was second in 1966. A separate Finnish Bandy Federation was founded in 1972, and the sport hasn't been a part of the Football Association or its districts since then.

The Saimaa district merged with the Kymenlaakso district in 1994 to form the current Suomen Palloliiton Kaakkois-Suomen piiri which includes the regions of Kymenlaakso and South Karelia as a whole and parts of the regions of Päijänne Tavastia, Southern Savonia and Uusimaa.

== District champions ==
In addition to taking part in league play the clubs of the district competed against each other in district championship tournaments. The district organized these tournaments in several levels known as classes and also for youth teams. The following lists include the 1st class champions until the 1970s.

=== Football ===
- 1924: Sudet
- 1925:
- 1926: Reipas
- 1927: Sudet
- 1928:
- 1929: ViPS
- 1930: ViPS
- 1931: Sudet
- 1932: Sudet
- 1933: Sudet
- 1934: Sudet
- 1935: Sudet
- 1936: Sudet
- 1937: Sudet
- 1938: Sudet
- 1939: Sudet
- 1940:
- 1941:
- 1942:
- 1943:
- 1944: Sudet
- 1945: LUM
- 1946: LUM
- 1947: SaPKo
- 1948: SaPKo
- 1949:
- 1950: LUM
- 1951:
- 1952: YVPS
- 1953: Veiterä
- 1954:
- 1955: MiPK
- 1956: MiPK
- 1957: MiPK
- 1958: MiPK
- 1959: MiPK
- 1960: MiPK
- 1961: MiPK
- 1962: MiPK
- 1963: MiPK
- 1964: LaPa
- 1965: MiPK
- 1966: MP
- 1967: Veiterä
- 1968: MP
- 1969: PaSa
- 1970: MP
- 1971: SaiPa
- 1972: MP
- 1973: SaiPa
- 1974: MiPK

Note: Data from 1975 to 1994 is missing.

=== Bandy ===
- 1924:
- 1925:
- 1926:
- 1927:
- 1928: Sudet
- 1929:
- 1930:
- 1931:
- 1932: ViPS
- 1933: Sudet
- 1934: Sudet
- 1935: LUM
- 1936: Sudet
- 1937: Sudet
- 1938: Ilves
- 1939: Ilves
- 1940:
- 1941:
- 1942:
- 1943:
- 1944: Sudet
- 1945: LUM
- 1946: LUM
- 1947:
- 1948: LUM
- 1949:
- 1950: LUM
- 1951:
- 1952: Veiterä
- 1953: Veiterä / SaiPa
- 1954:
- 1955: LaPa
- 1956: Veiterä
- 1957: Veiterä
- 1958: Veiterä
- 1959: Veiterä
- 1960: Veiterä
- 1961: MP
- 1962: MP
- 1963: LrPT
- 1964: LrPT
- 1965: LaPa
- 1966: Veiterä
- 1967: LaPa
- 1968: LaPa
- 1969: MP
- 1970: MP
- 1971: MP
- 1972: MP

Note: Bandy moved under the auspices of a separate Finnish Bandy Federation in 1972.

== Member clubs ==
The following is a list of clubs who were members of the district at some point during the first 50 years of its history (1924–1974).

- Aholahden Veto
- Askel-Pallo-67
- Enonkosken Urheilijat
- Enson Kisailijat
- Haukiniemen Haka
- Haukivuoren Kisailijat
- Havin Kiri
- Hiitolan Palloseura
- Hirvensalmen Urheilijat
- Imatran Erotuomarikerho
- Imatran Pallo
- Imatran Pallo-Salamat (merger between Imatran Pallo and Ylä-Vuoksen Palloseura)
- Imatran Jyske
- Johanneksen Kireät
- Joutsenon Kataja
- Joutsenon Kullervo (now Kultsu FC)
- Kadur
- Karjalan Urheilijat
- Karvilan Kivekkäät
- Kelkkalan Kisailijat
- Keltun Pojat
- Kerimäen Palloilijat
- Ketterä
- KN-Peikot (originally Konnunsuon Nuorisoseuran Urheilijat)
- Korven Pallo-Pojat
- Kotajärven Pallo
- Kuokkalan Rajaveikot
- Kulennoisten Pallo
- Käkisalmen Palloilijat
- Lahnaniemen Niverä
- Laitaatsillan Pallo
- Lappeen Riento
- Lappeenrannan Pallo
- Lappeenrannan Kisa-Toverit
- Lappeenrannan Pallo-Toverit
- Lappeenrannan Työväen Urheilijat
- Lappeenrannan Urheilu-Miehet
- Lauritsalan Kisa (originally Etelä-Saimaan Kisa)
- Lauritsalan NMKY
- Lauritsalan Pallokerho
- Lauritsalan Työväen Palloilijat
- Lauritsalan Urheilu-Kerho
- Lemin Eskot
- Los Hidalgos
- Luumäen Pojat
- Merenlahden Nuorisoseura
- Merijoen Urheilijat
- Mikkelin Erotuomarikerho
- Mikkelin Mikot
- Mikkelin Palloilijat
- Mikkelin Pallo-Kissat
- Mikkelin Peli-Pojat
- Mikkelin Vauhti
- Monrepon S-osaston Lammenpojat
- Montolan Nuorisoseura
- Mäntyharjun Jäntevä
- Mäntyharjun Urheilijat -50
- Otavan Viesti
- Parikkalan Urheilijat
- Pontuksen Veikot
- Porrassalmen Urheilijat -62
- Pääskylahden Vesa
- Rantakylän Reipas
- Rauhan Urheilijat
- Rauhaniemen Into
- Ristiinan Urheilijat
- Ruokolahden Raju
- Räisälän Pamaus
- Saimaan Erotuomarikerho (now Lappeenrannan Erotuomarikerho)
- Saimaan Pallo
- Savilahden Urheilijat
- Savitaipaleen Pallo -54
- Savitaipaleen Urheilijat
- Savonlinnan Jyry
- Savonlinnan Palloilijat
- Savonlinnan Pallokerho
- Savonlinnan Työväen Palloseura
- Simpeleen Urheilijat
- Simpeleen Vesa
- Tainionkosken Tähti
- Tainionkosken Urheilijat
- Taipalsaaren Pallo
- Taipalsaaren Veikot (originally Taipalsaaren Saaren-Veikot)
- Uuraan Palloveikot
- Uuraan Voima-Miehet
- Uus-Lavolan Haka
- Uus-Lavolan Peli-Pojat (now PEPO Lappeenranta)
- Veiterä
- Viipurin Aliupseerien Palloilijat (originally Viipurin Aliupseeriyhdistys)
- Viipurin Erotuomarikerho
- Viipurin IFK
- Viipurin Ilves (originally Viipurin Pallo-Veikot, now Tampere-Viipurin Ilves-Kissat)
- Viipurin NMKY
- Viipurin Pallokerho (now Pallokerho-35)
- Viipurin Palloseura
- Viipurin Raittiusseura Sarastus
- Viipurin Reipas (now Lahden Reipas)
- Viipurin Sudet (now Sudet)
- Viipurin Venäläinen Yhdistys
- Vuoksenniskan Urheilijat
- Vuoksenniskan Vesa
- Vuorenmaan Jousi
- Ylä-Vuoksen Palloseura
