= 1908 Finnish football championship =

Finnish football championship
- Season: 1908
- Country: Finland

The 1908 Finnish football championship was the first edition of the Finnish football championship. Four teams participated in the final tournament, which was won by Unitas Sports Club.

== Final tournament ==
=== Semifinals ===
Winner	Agg.	Loser	Score	
Unitas Sports Club	9:6	Helsingin Jalkapalloklubi	2:2	7:4
Polyteknikkojen Urheiluseura	4:1	Reipas Viipuri	4:1	

=== Final ===
Winner	Runner-up	Score
Unitas Sports Club	Polyteknikkojen Urheiluseura	4:1
