= George W. Easton =

Scottish businessman, footballer and sportsperson

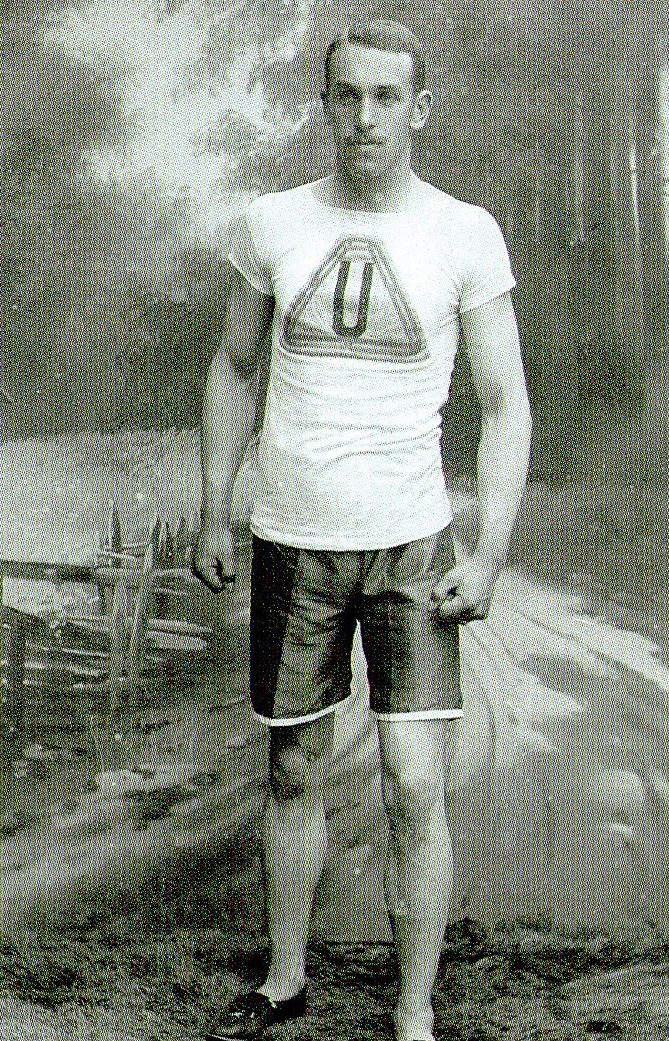
- Easton in 1908 wearing Unitas outfit.
- Born: George Wylie Easton; 21 September 1883; Bo'ness, Scotland
- Died: 13 March 1966 (aged 82); Surbiton, England
- Occupations: Businessman, footballer, sportsman

George Wylie Easton (1883–1966) was a Scottish businessman, footballer and sportsperson. He lived in Finland from 1903 to 1939 and worked on the timber trade mostly in the city of Vyborg. Easton was an enthusiast sportsman who was interested in football, athletics and curling.

In 1903 Easton moved to Western Finnish coastal town of Jakobstad and three years later to neighboring Kokkola introducing football to both towns. The first football match in Kokkola was played between the crew of a British merchant ship and the local voluntary fire brigade. In 1908 Easton won the first Finnish championship title with Unitas Sports Club. He played and coached the rest of his career for Reipas of Vyborg.

Easton was also a talented sprinter. His record on 100 metres run was 10.8 (1910) and on 200 metres 23.4 (1910). Easton's record on 200 metres was 0.2 seconds better than the Finnish record of that time. His unofficial record on 100 metres is said to be 10.4. Easton participated the Finnish Championships in Athletics but was not awarded since he did not hold the Finnish citizenship.

In 1909 Easton introduced curling to Finland. He acquired the equipment from British engineers working at the Putilov gun plant in St. Petersburg. The first official match was held a year later in Vyborg as the local club Reipas played against English Curling Club of Moscow.

== Honors ==
- Finnish Football Championship: 1908
