= Gösta Löfgren (footballer, born 1891) =

Finnish footballer

Personal information
- Full name: Gösta Bernhard Löfgren
- Date of birth: 10 September 1891
- Place of birth: Helsinki, Grand Duchy of Finland
- Date of death: 21 February 1932 (aged 40)
- Place of death: Helsinki, Finland
- Position: Defender

Senior career*
Years	Team	Apps	(Gls)
1908	Unitas	–	(–)
1911–1912	HIFK	–	(–)

International career
1911–1912	Finland	6	(0)
- * Club domestic league appearances and goals

Gösta Löfgren (10 September 1891 – 21 February 1932) was a Finnish footballer.

== Club career ==
Löfgren played in Finland for Unitas Sports Club and HIFK. He was a member of the 1908 Unitas squad winning the first ever Finnish championship title.

== International career ==
Löfgren played his first international for Finland in October 1911 against Sweden. It was also the first international match for Finland national team. Löfgren capped 6 times for Finland and was a member of the Finnish squad at the 1912 Summer Olympics in Stockholm.

== Honors ==
- Finnish Championship: 1908
