= 1909 Finnish football championship =

Finnish football championship
- Season: 1908

The 1909 Finnish football championship was the second edition of the Finnish football championship. Four teams participated in the final tournament, which was won by Polyteknikkojen Urheiluseura.

== Final tournament ==
=== Semifinals ===
			Score
Helsingfors IFK	–	Helsingin Jalkapalloklubi	1:1, 3:2
Polyteknikkojen Urheiluseura	–	Viipurin Reipas	6:1

=== Final ===
			Score
Polyteknikkojen Urheiluseura	–	Helsingfors IFK	4:0
