= 1910 Finnish football championship =

Finnish football championship
- Season: 1910

The 1910 Finnish football championship was the third edition of the Finnish football championship. Four teams participated in the final tournament, which was won by Åbo IFK.

== Final tournament ==
=== Semifinals ===
Date				Score
September 19, 1910	Viipurin Reipas	–	Viipurin Ponteva	6:2
September 25, 1910	Helsingin Jalkapalloklubi	–	Åbo IFK	1:3

=== Final ===
Date				Score
October 10, 1910	Åbo IFK	–	Viipurin Reipas	4:2
