= List of Finnish football champions =

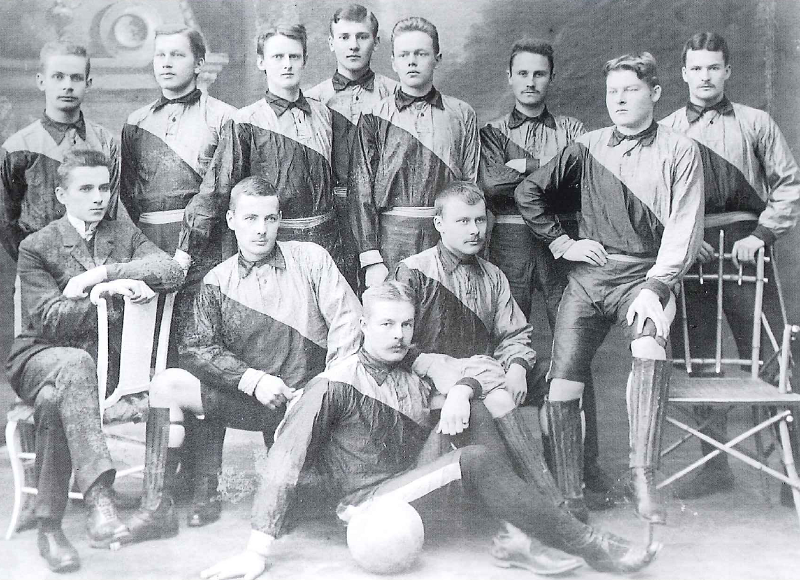
PUS in 1909, the second Finnish football champions.

The association football champions of Finland are the winners of the highest league in Finnish football, which is currently the Veikkausliiga (Swedish: Tipsligan) . It has been played since 1990. The first 21 championship titles were decided with cup competition. From 1930 to 1989 the highest division was known as Mestaruussarja. Veikkausliiga seasons 1990 and 1991 were played under the name "Futisliiga" (Swedish: Fotbollsligan).

== Champions ==
=== Cup Competition 1908–1929 ===
Season	Winner	Runners-up	Result
1908	Unitas	PUS	4–1
1909	PUS	HIFK	4–0
1910	ÅIFK	Reipas	4–2
1911	HJK	ÅIFK	7–1
1912	HJK	HIFK	7–1
1913	KIF	ÅIFK	5–3
1914	Not played due to World War I.		
1915	KIF	ÅIFK	1–0
1916	KIF	ÅIFK	3–2
1917	HJK	ÅIFK	4–2
1918	HJK	Reipas	3–0
1919	HJK	Reipas	1–0
1920	ÅIFK	HPS	2–1
1921	HPS	HJK	1–1 / 2–1 R
1922	HPS	Reipas	4–2
1923	HJK	TPS	3–1
1924	ÅIFK	HPS	4–3
1925	HJK	TPS	3–2
1926	HPS	TPS	5–2
1927	HPS	Reipas	6–0
1928	TPS	HIFK	1–1 / 3–2 R
1929	HPS	HIFK	4–0

=== Mestaruussarja 1930–1989 ===
Season	Winner	Runners-up	Third place
1930	HIFK	TPS	HPS
1931	HIFK	HPS	TPS
1932	HPS	VPS	HIFK
1933	HIFK	HJK	Sudet
1934	HPS	HIFK	Toverit
1935	HPS	HIFK	Toverit
1936	HJK	HPS	HIFK
1937	HIFK	HJK	Sudet
1938	HJK	TPS	VPS
1939	TPS	HJK	Toverit
1940	Sudet	TPS	–
1941	TPS	VPS	Sudet
1942	Toverit	Sudet	–
1943	Not played due to World War II.		
1944	VIFK	TPS	Sudet
1945	VPS	HPS	–
1946	VIFK	TPV	–
1947	HIFK	TuTo	KTP
1948	VPS	TPS	HPS
1949	TPS	VPS	KIF
1950	Ilves-Kissat	KuPS	VIFK
1951	KTP	VIFK	TPK
1952	KTP	VIFK	Pyrkivä
1953	VIFK	Jäntevä	KuPS
1954	Pyrkivä	KuPS	HJK
1955	KIF	FC Haka	VIFK
1956	KuPS	HJK	KIF
1957	HPS	FC Haka	TPS
1958	KuPS	HPS	HIFK
1959	HIFK	RU-38	FC Haka
1960	FC Haka	TPS	KIF
1961	HIFK	KIF	FC Haka
1962	FC Haka	Reipas Lahti	TaPa
1963	Reipas Lahti	FC Haka	ÅIFK
1964	HJK	KuPS	KTP
1965	FC Haka	HJK	Reipas Lahti
1966	KuPS	HJK	FC Haka
1967	Reipas Lahti	KuPS	TPS
1968	TPS	Reipas Lahti	HJK
1969	KPV	KuPS	HJK
1970	Reipas Lahti	MP	HIFK
1971	TPS	HIFK	KPV
1972	TPS	MP	Reipas Lahti
1973	HJK	KPV	Reipas Lahti
1974	KuPS	Reipas Lahti	HJK
1975	TPS	KuPS	KPV
1976	KuPS	FC Haka	HJK
1977	FC Haka	KuPS	TPS
1978	HJK	KPT	FC Haka
1979	OPS	KuPS	HJK
1980	OPS	FC Haka	HJK
1981	HJK	KPT	FC Haka
1982	Kuusysi	HJK	FC Haka
1983	Ilves	HJK	FC Haka
1984	Kuusysi	TPS	Ilves
1985	HJK	Ilves	KePS
1986	Kuusysi	TPS	HJK
1987	HJK	Kuusysi	TPS
1988	HJK	Kuusysi	RoPS
1989	Kuusysi	TPS	RoPS

=== Veikkausliiga 1990–present ===
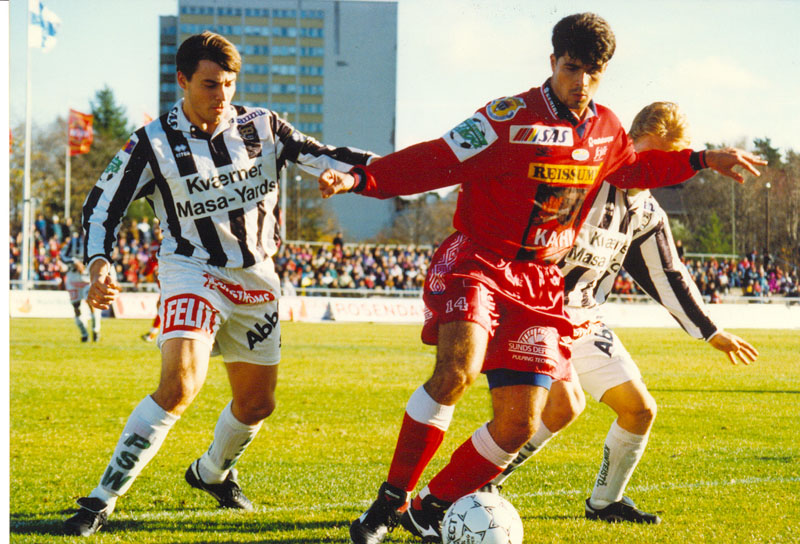
FC Jazz against TPS in 1996

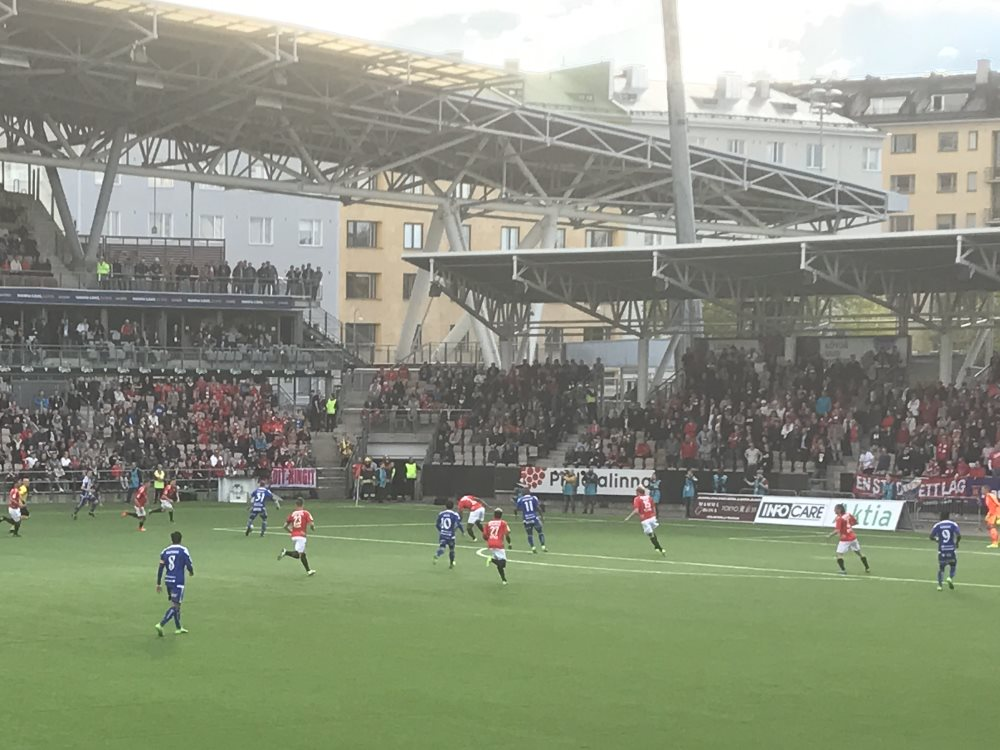
Famous Helsinki rivalry Stadin derby

Season	Winner	Runners-up	Third place
1990	HJK	Kuusysi	MP
1991	Kuusysi	MP	FC Haka
1992	HJK	Kuusysi	FC Jazz
1993	FC Jazz	MyPa	HJK
1994	TPV	MyPa	HJK
1995	FC Haka	MyPa	HJK
1996	FC Jazz	MyPa	TPS
1997	HJK	VPS	FinnPa
1998	FC Haka	VPS	PK-35
1999	FC Haka	HJK	MyPa
2000	FC Haka	FC Jokerit	MyPa
2001	TamU	HJK	MyPa
2002	HJK	MyPa	FC Haka
2003	HJK	FC Haka	TamU
2004	FC Haka	AC Allianssi	TamU
2005	MyPa	HJK	TamU
2006	TamU	HJK	FC Haka
2007	TamU	FC Haka	TPS
2008	Inter Turku	FC Honka	FC Lahti
2009	HJK	FC Honka	TPS
2010	HJK	KuPS	TPS
2011	HJK	FC Inter	JJK
2012	HJK	FC Inter	TPS
2013	HJK	FC Honka	VPS
2014	HJK	SJK	FC Lahti
2015	SJK	RoPS	HJK
2016	IFK Mariehamn	HJK	SJK
2017	HJK	KuPS	FC Ilves
2018	HJK	RoPS	KuPS
2019	KuPS	FC Inter	FC Honka
2020	HJK	FC Inter	KuPS
2021	HJK	KuPS	SJK
2022	HJK	KuPS	FC Honka
2023	HJK	KuPS	VPS
2024	KuPS	Ilves	HJK
2025	KuPS	Inter Turku	Ilves
2026	Inter Turku	HJK	KuPS

== Performance ==
=== Performance by club ===
The following clubs have won:

Finnish Championship Cup Competition (1908–1929)
Mestaruussarja (1930–1989)
Veikkausliiga (1990–present)

29 clubs have been Champions.

Club	Titles	Runners-up	Winning years
HJK	33	15	1911, 1912, 1917, 1918, 1919, 1923, 1925, 1936, 1938, 1964, 1973, 1978, 1981, 1985, 1987, 1988, 1990, 1992, 1997, 2002, 2003, 2009, 2010, 2011, 2012, 2013, 2014, 2017, 2018, 2020, 2021, 2022, 2023
FC Haka	9	7	1960, 1962, 1965, 1977, 1995, 1998, 1999, 2000, 2004
HPS	9	6	1921, 1922, 1926, 1927, 1929, 1932, 1934, 1935, 1957
TPS	8	12	1928, 1939, 1941, 1949, 1968, 1971, 1972, 1975
KuPS	8	13	1956, 1958, 1966, 1974, 1976, 2019, 2024, 2025
HIFK	7	7	1930, 1931, 1933, 1937, 1947, 1959, 1961
FC Kuusysi	5	4	1982, 1984, 1986, 1989, 1991
Kiffen	4	–	1913, 1915, 1916, 1955
ÅIFK	3	5	1910, 1920, 1924
Reipas Lahti	3	3	1963, 1967, 1970
VIFK	3	2	1944, 1946, 1953
Tampere United	3	–	2001, 2006, 2007
VPS	2	5	1945, 1948
FC Inter Turku	2	4	2008, 2026
KTP	2	–	1951, 1952
OPS	2	–	1979, 1980
FC Jazz	2	–	1993, 1996
MyPa	1	5	2005
Ilves	1	2	1983
SJK	1	1	2015
PUS	1	1	1909
Sudet Vyborg	1	1	1940
KPV	1	1	1969
Unitas	1	–	1908
HT	1	–	1942
Ilves-Kissat	1	–	1950
Pyrkivä Turku	1	–	1954
TPV	1	–	1994
IFK Mariehamn	1	–	2016

Titles won by club (%)
1. Helsingin Jalkapalloklubi – 33 (28.7%)
2. FC Haka - 9 (7.80%)
3. Helsingin Palloseura - 9 (7.80%)
4. Turun Palloseura - 8 (7.00%)
5. IFK Helsingfors - 7 (6.10%)
6. Kuopion Palloseura - 7 (6.10%)
7. FCKuusysi - 5 (4.30%)
8. FC Kiffen 08 - 4 (3.50%)
9. Other Teams - 33 (28.7%)
