= SPL Karjalan piiri =

Suomen Palloliiton Karjalan piiri
- Abbreviation: SPL Karjala
- Formation: 1930
- Purpose: District Football Association
- Location: Sortavala

The SPL Karjalan piiri (Karelia Football Association) is a former district organisation of the Football Association of Finland. It administered football in the North Karelia area.

== Background ==
Suomen Palloliitto Karjalan piiri, commonly referred to as SPL Karjalan piiri or SPL Karjala, was the governing body for football in the North Karelia area. The organisation was founded in May 1930 and was based in Sortavala. It is not clear when the association ceased operating but it is known that 4 clubs broke away from their own area to form the SPL Joensuun piiri on 18 December 1938.

== Member clubs ==
Member clubs affiliated to the association included:

- Joensuun Kalevaiset
- Joensuun Palloseura
- Sortavalan Palloilijat (SP)
- Sortavalan Palloseura (SPS)
