= PUS-Basket =

- Leagues: Finland's Southern 2nd division (Men's team); Finland's Southern 3rd division (Women's team)
- Founded: 1981; 44 years ago
- History: Otaniemen KoriPojat (1979–1981), PUS-Basket (1981–)
- Arena: Leppävaaran liikuntahalli
- Location: Espoo, Finland
- Team colors: Red, white and black
- Website: pusbasket.ayy.fi

PUS-Basket is the basketball club of Aalto University School of Science (former Helsinki University of Technology) from Espoo, Finland. Although PUS-Basket is a club representing a university, the club's teams compete in the 3rd and 4th highest levels of Finnish basketball leagues.

== Club ==
PUS stands for Polyteknikkojen Urheiluseura (Polytechnics' Sports Club, nowadays known as Aalto University Sports Club), which was founded in 1910 for all the University's sporting activities. PUS-Basket itself was founded 1981, so it celebrates its 35-year anniversary in September 2016.

In 2015–16 season, PUS-Basket has 3 teams (2 men's teams + 1 women's team) and thus around 40 club members.

Besides basketball, PUS has also ice hockey and volleyball teams. Additional student sporting activities are available.

== Level ==
The PUS-Basket men's 1st team plays in Finland's Southern region's 2nd division, which is the highest regional level in Finnish men's basketball. 2nd division is an amateur level, where the longest distances between teams are ca. 100 km (62 mi), though 8 of 13 teams are from the Helsinki Metropolitan Area.

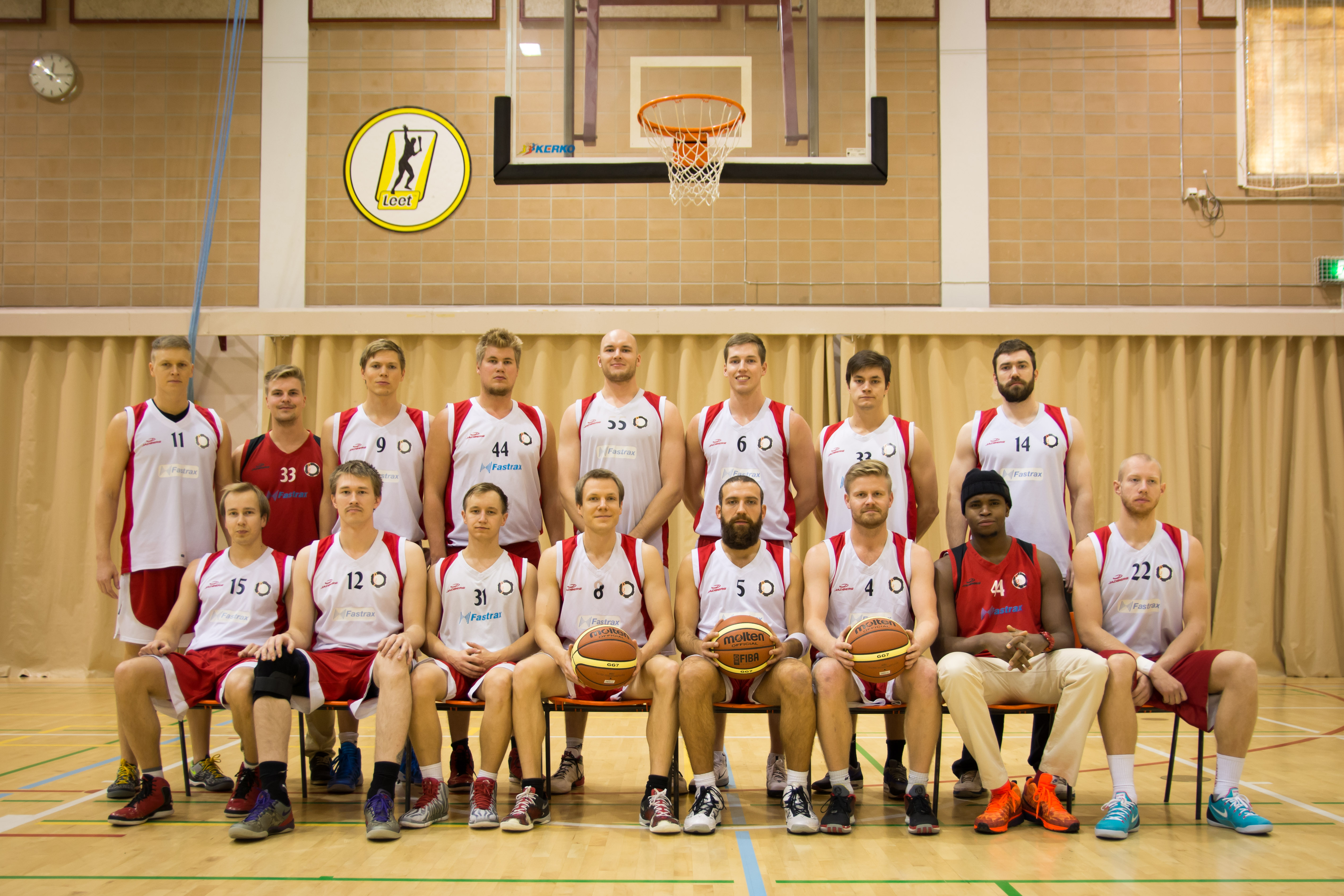
Team picture (1st team), November 2014

PUS-Basket's men's 2nd team plays in the Aalto Basketball League, which is played between student guild teams on the Otaniemi campus.

PUS-Basket's women's team plays in Finland's Southern region's 3rd division, which is the second highest regional level in Finnish women's basketball.
