= Finnish District Football Associations =

The District Football Associations were the local governing bodies of association football in Finland. The 24 District FAs existed to govern all aspects of local football in their defined areas, providing grassroots support to the Finnish Football Association by promoting and administering football and futsal in their respective districts. The District FAs administered youth football and the lower tier leagues covering Kolmonen (Division 3) and the lower divisions.

All of the District Associations were disestablished on 1 January 2020.

== Organisations ==
The 24 district organisations were as follows:

- Ålands Fotbollförbund
- SPL Helsingin piiri
- SPL Itä-Suomen piiri
- SPL Kaakkois-Suomen piiri
- SPL Keski-Pohjanmaan piiri
- SPL Keski-Suomen piiri
- SPL Pohjois-Suomen piiri
- SPL Satakunnan piiri
- SPL Tampereen piiri
- SPL Turun piiri
- SPL Uudenmaan piiri
- SPL Vaasan piiri
- SPL Hämeen-Satakunnan piiri
- SPL Hämeen piiri
- SPL Joensuun piiri
- SPL Karjalan piiri
- SPL Keski-Uudenmaan piiri
- SPL Kymenlaakson piiri
- SPL Lahden piiri
- SPL Lapin piiri
- SPL Länsi-Uudenmaan piiri
- SPL Oulun piiri
- SPL Saimaan piiri
- SPL Savon piiri
