= Ice hockey in Finland =

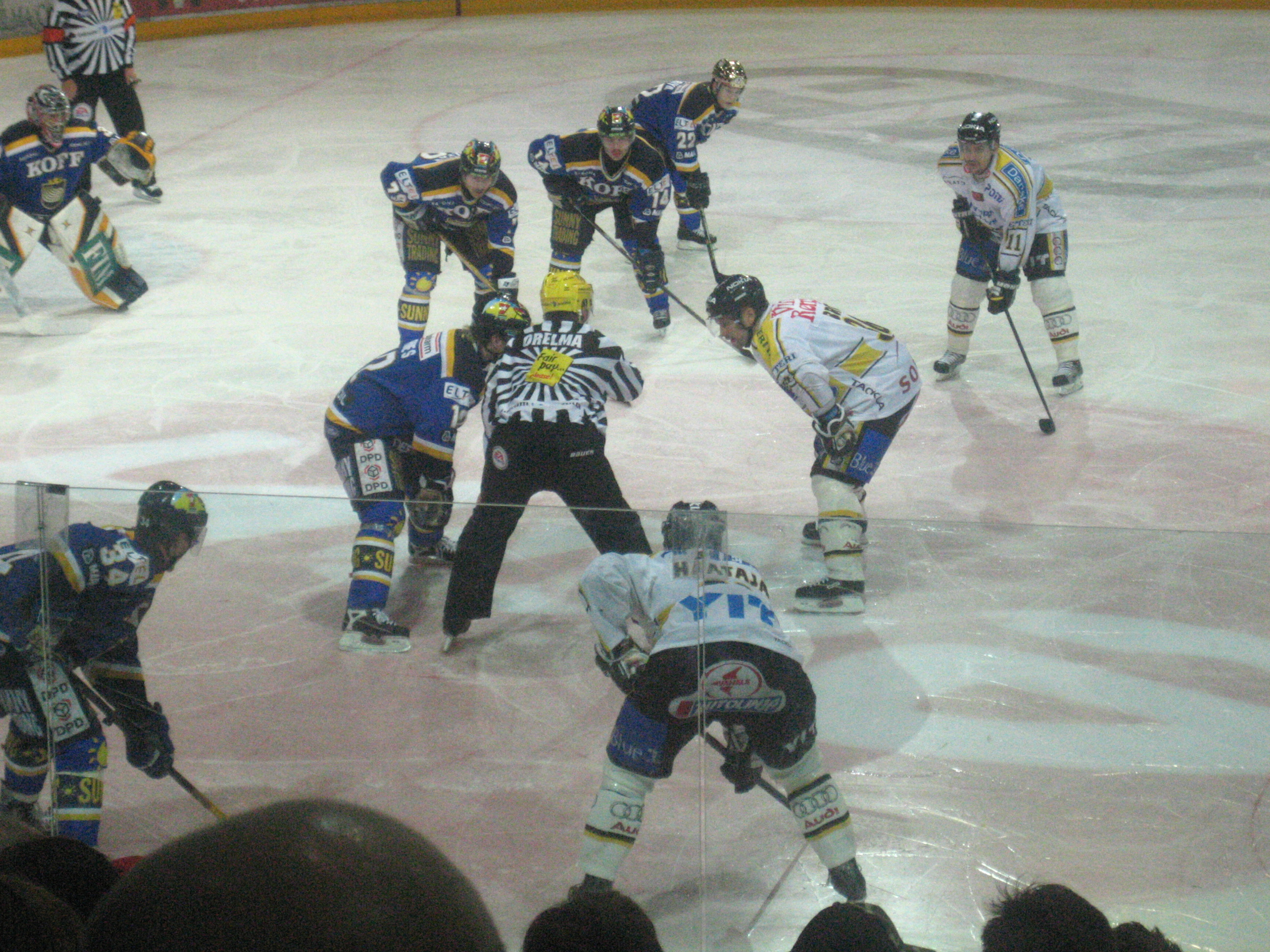
- Esa Pirnes (Blues) and Michal Bros (Kärpät) in the faceoff circle during a decisive SM-liiga playoff game on 1 April 2006.
- Country: Finland
- Governing body: Finnish Ice Hockey Association
- National teams: Men's national team; Women's national team; Men's national junior team; Men's national U18 team; Women's national U18 team
- Nicknames: Leijonat (men); Naisleijonat (women); Nuoret Leijonat (junior men); Pikkuleijonat (U18 men); Tyttöleijonat (U18 women)
- Registered players: 71,063

National competitions
- Men; SM-liiga / Mestis / Suomi-sarja; Women; Naisten Liiga / Naisten Mestis / N. Suomi-sarja; Junior; U20 SM-sarja / U20 Mestis / U20 Suomi-sarja; U18 SM-sarja / U18 Mestis / U18 Suomi-sarja; U16 SM-sarja / U16 Mestis / U16 Suomi-sarja

Ice hockey is the most popular sport in Finland in terms of television viewership and game attendance figures. It is third most popular sport in participation amongst children. As of 2020, approximately 1.3% of the Finnish population was registered with the International Ice Hockey Federation, ranking Finland second in the world for percentage of population participating in ice hockey (Note: The country with the highest percentage of participation is Canada at 1.6%.) and the highest percentage of any country outside of North America.

== History ==
Ice hockey leagues were first established in Finland in the 1920s. SM-sarja was established as the first national men's ice hockey league in 1928. Viipurin Reipas were champions in the inaugural year and remain one of the oldest ice hockey teams in Finland, still competing today under the name Lahti Pelicans.

Finland's first ice hockey rink, Hakametsä, was founded in January 1965 in Tampere.

== Governing body ==
The Finnish Ice Hockey Association (Finnish: Suomen Jääkiekkoliitto) is the national board for ice hockey in the country and has been instrumental in producing many world class ice hockey players.

Since 2011, the association has operated a financial support system for minor and junior ice hockey players from low-income families. In 2021, 975 players qualified for grants ranging from 700 to 1,300 euros, determined by player age level. In total, the program has distributed approximately 6.7 million euros to youth hockey players since 2011.

== National teams ==
As of May 2022, Finland is the first in the IIHF World Rankings for men's and third for women's national team programs.

Finland men's national ice hockey team is one of the major powers in world hockey; they won their third World Championship in 2019. The men's national team is a member of the so-called "Big Six" an unofficial group of the top men's national teams in world hockey. At the 2022 Winter Olympics, the Finnish hockey team won at the Men's tournament Olympic gold for the first time.

Finland women's national ice hockey team is recognized as one of the few national teams able to challenge American and Canadian dominance in the highest levels of women's international hockey. The team took silver at the World Championship in 2019 after a controversial loss to the United States in the finals. Though they did not claim gold, multiple Finnish players received awards in the 2019 tournament; team captain Jenni Hiirikoski was awarded MVP and Best Defenceman, Noora Räty was awarded Best Goaltender, and forward Michelle Karvinen was named to the All-Star Team along with Hiirikoski and Räty.

== Domestic leagues ==
=== Men's leagues ===
Tier	Leagues/Divisions	
1	Liiga; 17 teams	
2	Mestis; 9 teams	
3	Suomi-sarja; 14 teams	
3	4+	All divisions after Suomi-sarja are organized regionally

Finnish national cup competition
Finnish Cup

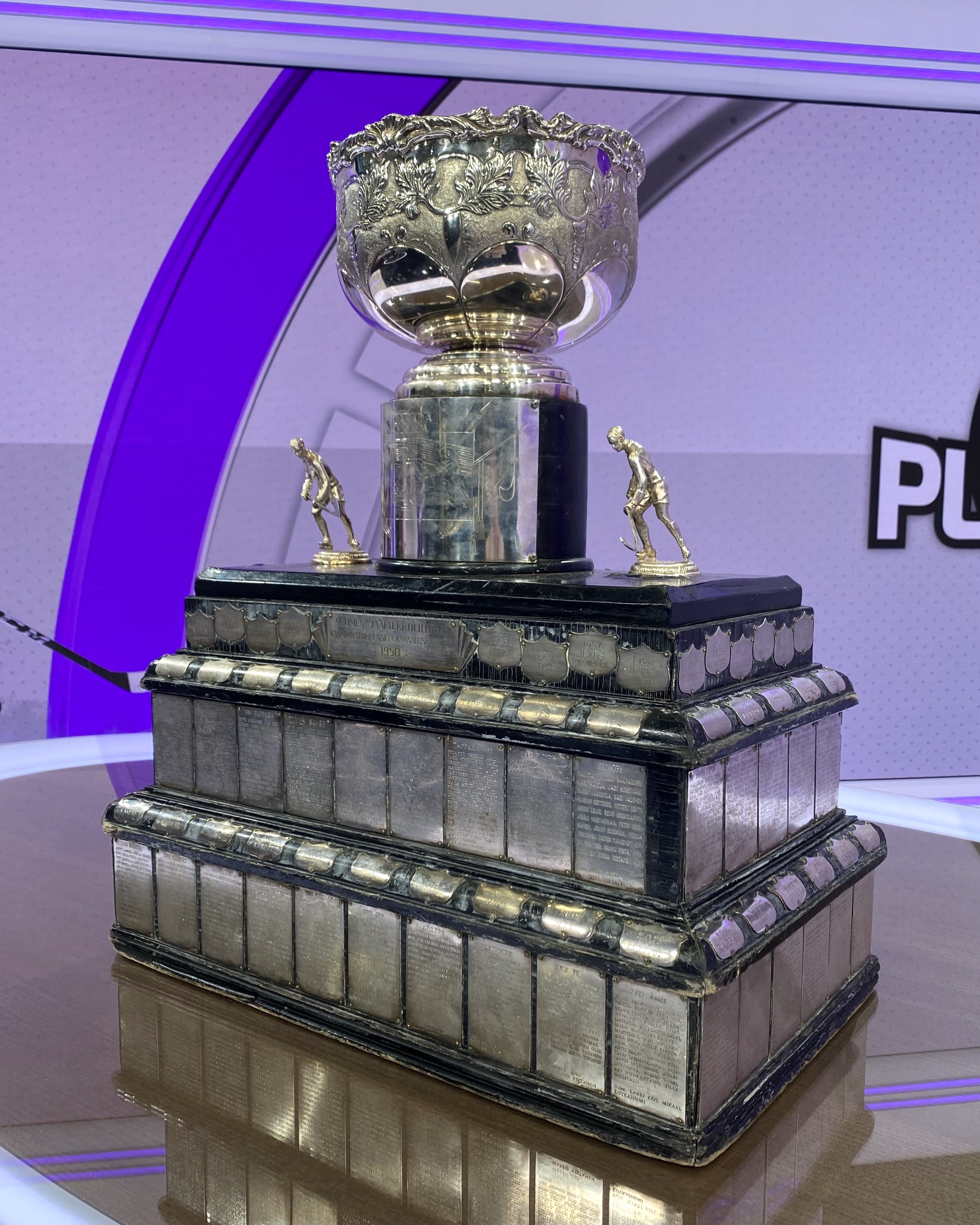
Kanada-malja is Finland's main ice hockey club championship trophy

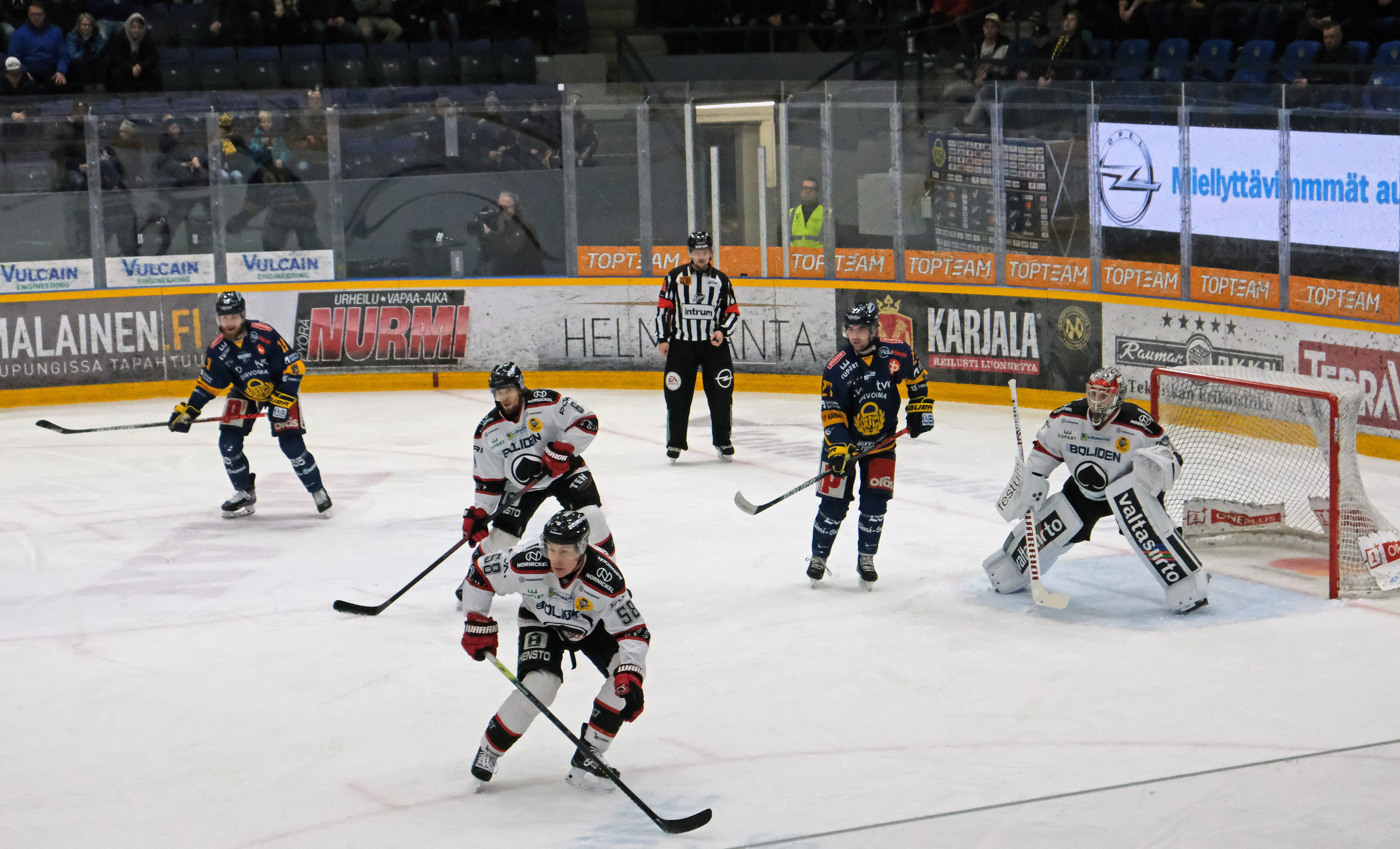
Lukko - Ässät Satakunnan derby, local match in November 2019 in Rauma.

Finland has five men's and three women's high-level leagues. The SM-liiga is the elite league for men's ice hockey in Finland. It was created 1975 as the first domestic professional ice hockey league and replaced the SM-sarja as the top national division. The Liiga is a closed league and is run by the independent Jääkiekkon SM-liiga Oy, making it the only Finnish league not operated by the Finnish Ice Hockey Association. The SM-liiga is a closed league; teams are fixed and promotion and relegation are not used. The second- and third-highest men's ice hockey leagues in Finland are the Mestis and the Suomi-sarja; many Mestis and Suomi-sarja teams serve as farm teams to Liiga clubs. Promotion and relegation between the Mestis and Suomi-sarja is possible each season. The lower-level men's leagues play within regional divisions and are the fourth-tier II-divisioona or 2. divisioona, the fifth-tier III-divisioona or 3. divisioona, and the sixth-tier IV-divisioona or 4. divisioona.

=== Women's leagues ===
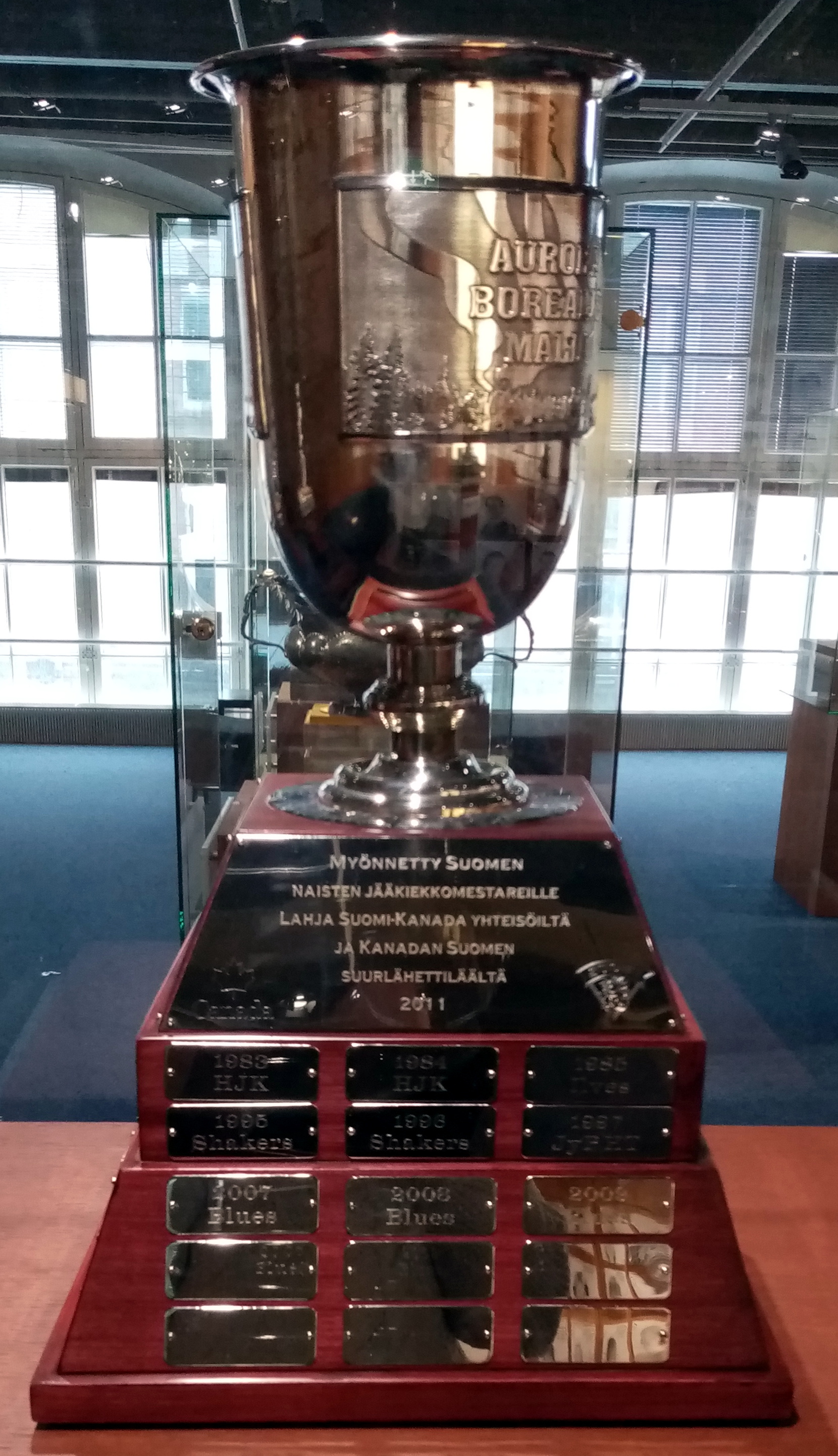
Aurora Borealis Cup is Finnish women's ice hockey club championship trophy

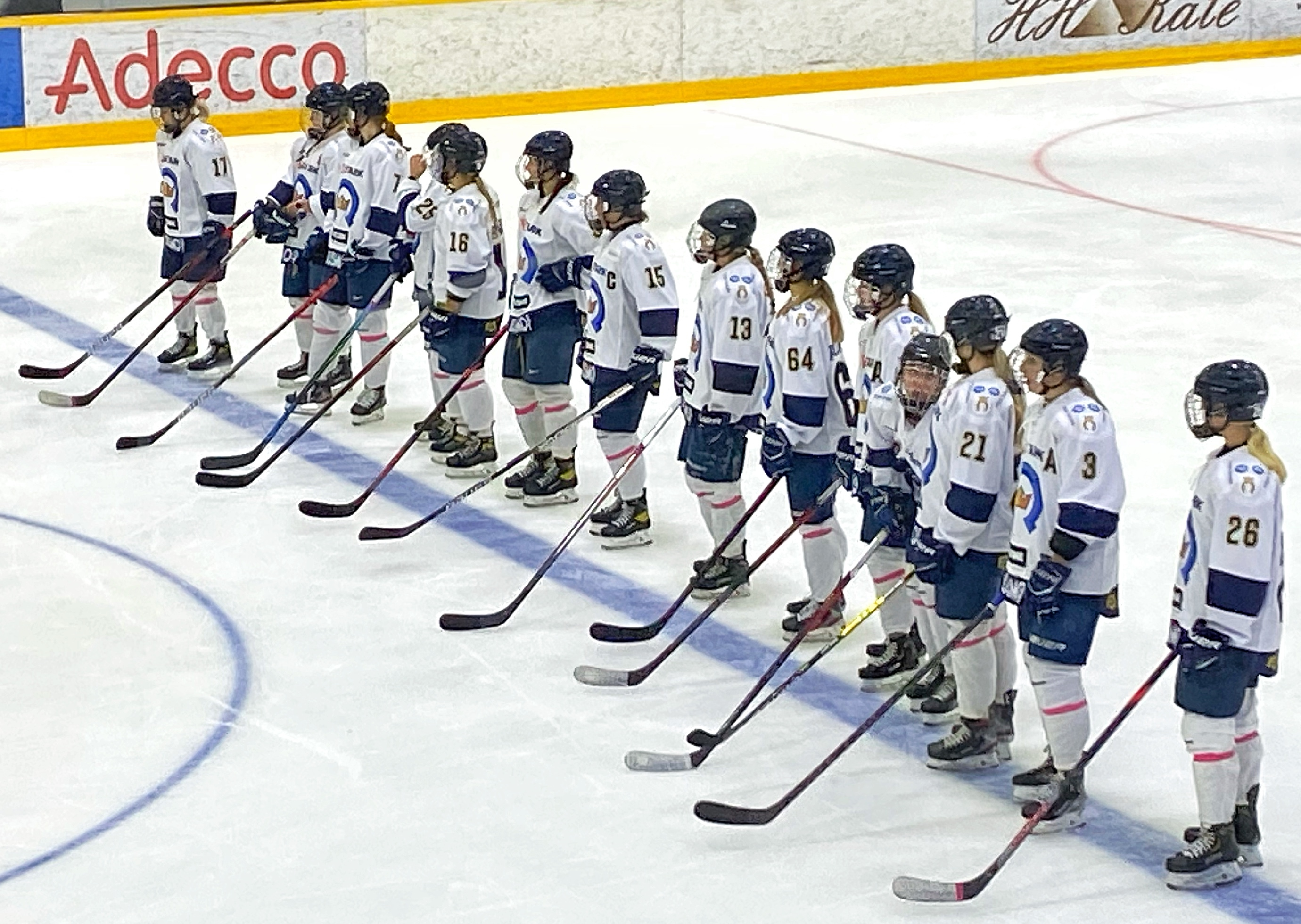
Kiekko-Espoo Naiset

The national women's leagues in Finland are the Naisten Liiga (called Jääkiekon naisten SM-sarja or Naisten SM-sarja before 2017), the second-tier Naisten Mestis, and the third-tier Naisten Suomi-sarja. The Naisten Liiga is the elite league for women's ice hockey in Finland; established in 1982 and has been in continuous operation since the 1982–83 season.

The Naisten Liiga season begins with ten teams in a 20-game preliminary series to determine rank, followed by an upper-divisional series played by the top six ranked teams and a lower-divisional series played by the four lowest ranked teams and the two best teams from the Naisten Mestis cross-qualifiers. At the end of the season, the four teams with the lowest point totals in the lower division of the Naisten Liiga play a promotion/relegation series for placement in the league for the following season; only two teams will remain in the Naisten Liiga, the other teams begin the following season in the Naisten Mestis.

Every women's team, with the exception of the ten teams in the Naisten Liiga, begins the season in the Naisten Mestis qualifiers. The teams are sorted into groups and play a fifteen or sixteen-game series intra-group series. The top team or teams from each group proceed to the Naisten Mestis cross-qualifiers for a chance to gain mid-season promotion to the Naisten Liiga and all other teams continue in the Naisten Suomi-sarja regular season. After the Naisten Mestis cross-qualifiers, the teams that did not gain promotion to the Naisten Liiga proceed to the Naisten Mestis regular season. It is possible for a newly created team to gain promotion to the Naisten Liiga in the span of their inaugural season, as Stadin Gimmat (HIFK Naiset) did in 2018–19.

=== Junior leagues ===
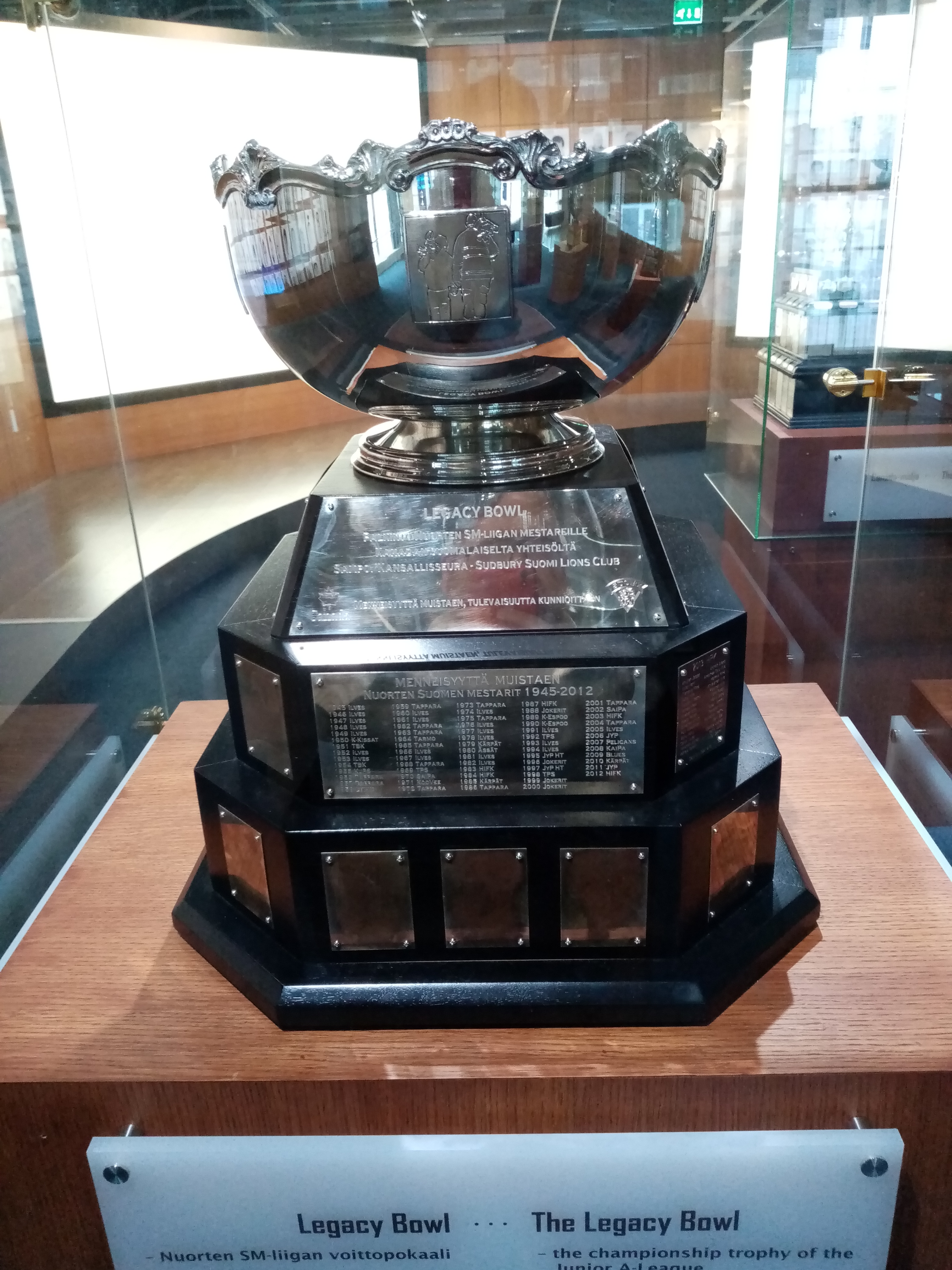
The Legacy Bowl is the men's U20 SM-sarja Championship trophy

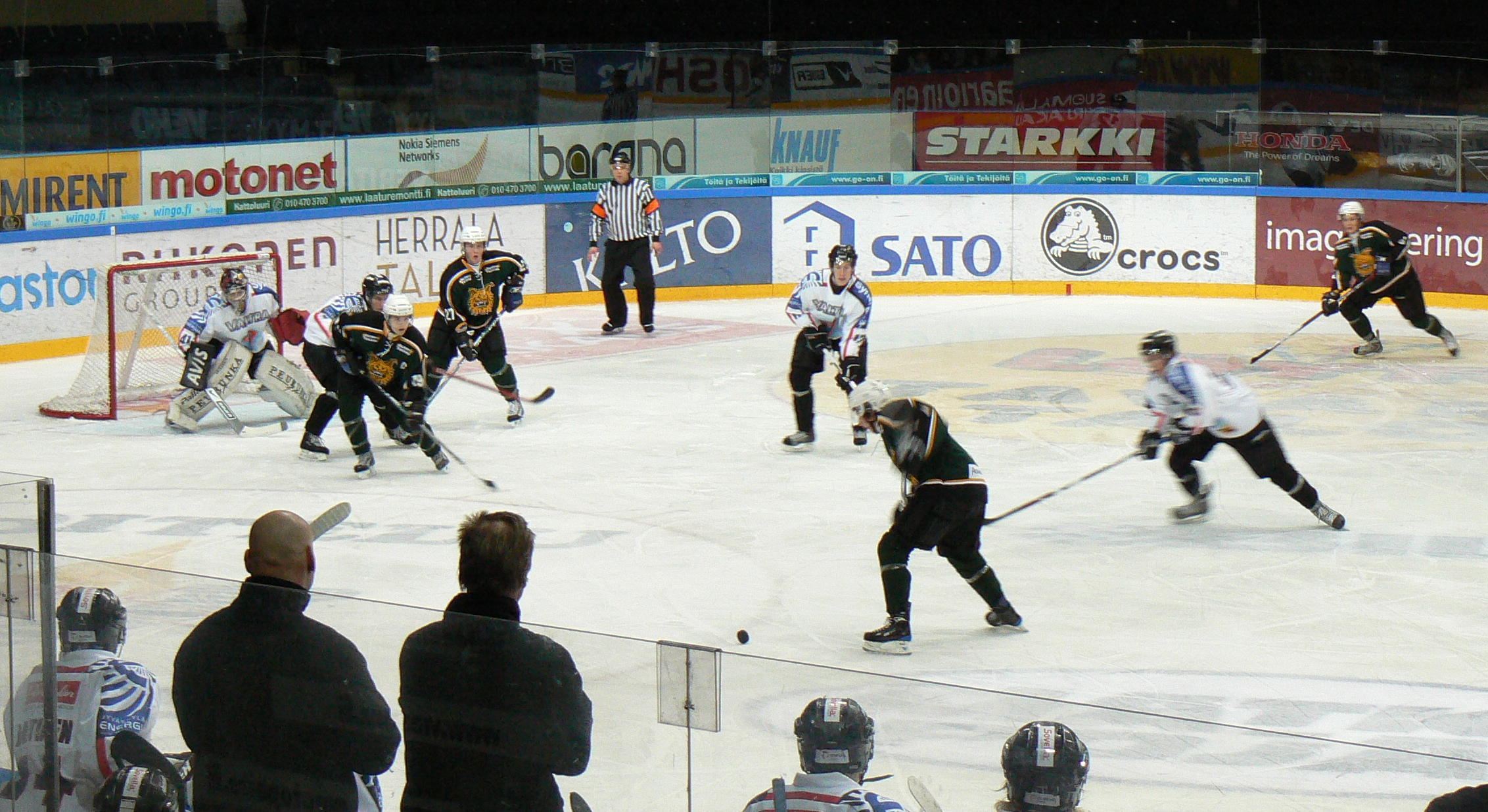
Ilves vs JYP in 2008

National men's junior ice hockey leagues exists at the under-16 (U16, previously C-nuoret), under-18 (U18, previously B-nuoret), and under-20 (U20, previously A-nuoret) age groups. Each age group has the same three-tier structure as the senior leagues, i.e. there is a top-level SM-sarja, a second-tier Mestis, and a third-tier Suomi-sarja for U16, U18, and U20. The teams of the U20 SM-sarja differ from those in the other junior leagues because nearly all of them are managed directly by the SM-liiga club, rather than by the affiliated junior club. For example, TPS U20 is operated by HC TPS Turku Oy, the limited company which owns the SM-liiga team HC TPS, but all other TPS junior and minor team are organized by TPS Juniorijääkiekko ry, an affiliated but distinct non-profit organization.

It is common for a club to have multiple teams in each age group and, though less common, a single club may have more than one team competing in the same league. For example, during the 2019–20 season, Kärpät U18 competed in the U18 SM-sarja while both Kärpät U18 Akatemia and Kärpät U18 Team played in the U20 Mestis. 'Team' or akatemia, meaning 'academy,' are often used to denote a given team is not the club's top-tier team of its age group, as are the number 2 or the numerals II. Some clubs use novel nomenclature to distinguish their teams, like Kiekko-Espoo U18 Blues and Kiekko-Espoo U18 Challenger, both of which played in the 2019–20 U18 Mestis season.

=== College ice hockey ===
Several Finnish college ice hockey teams have participated in the lower divisions of men's ice hockey before, but in 2023 a college ice hockey league of 17 teams called the FCAA Hockey was established. The first games were followed by over 1 400 spectators.
