= Football Association of Finland =

Sports governing body in Finland

UEFA
- Founded: 19 May 1907; 119 years ago
- Headquarters: Bolt Arena
- FIFA affiliation: 1908
- UEFA affiliation: 15 June 1954; 72 years ago
- President: Ari Lahti
- General Secretary: Marco Casagrande
- Website: https://www.palloliitto.fi/

The Football Association of Finland (Finnish: Suomen Palloliitto, abbr. SPL; Swedish: Finlands Bollförbund) is the governing body of football and futsal in Finland. It was founded in Helsinki on 19 May 1907.

The SPL organises the men's and women's national football teams, the second to ninth tiers of national football, the Finnish Cup and the Finnish League Cup. The premier division Veikkausliiga is organised by a distinct organisation. The SPL is based in the Finnish capital city of Helsinki.

== History ==
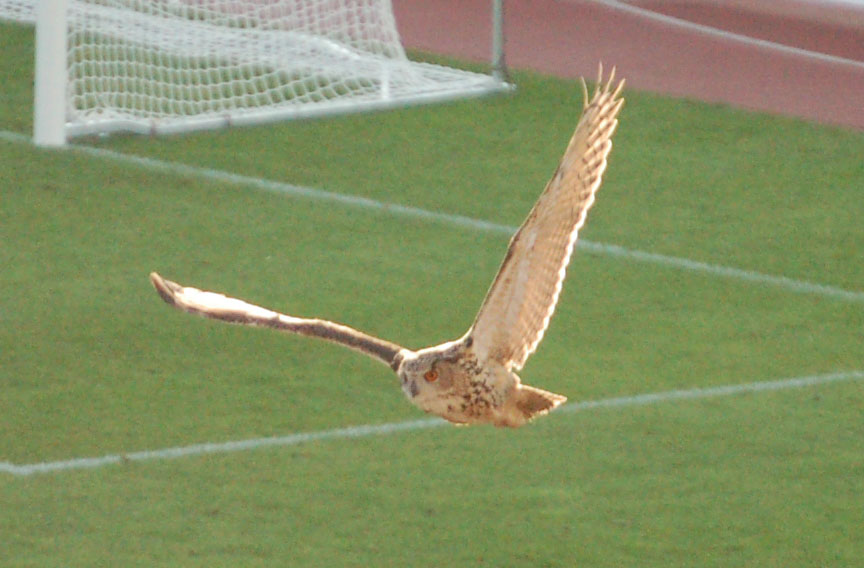
Eurasian Eagle-Owl (Bubi) at the Helsinki Olympic Stadium, which became the mascot of the Finnish national football.

The SPL was founded on 19 May 1907 in a restaurant called Catani in Esplanadi, Helsinki. The founding meeting was attended by representatives of Unitas Sports Club, Stjernan and Polytechnics Sports Club from Helsinki, Viborgs Hockeyklubb from Vyborg, Åbo Idrottsvänner and Turun Jalkapalloseura from Turku and Idrottens Vänner from Kokkola.

The association was the governing body of bandy in Finland until Finland's Bandy Association was founded in 1972. In 1928, it also arranged the first Finland ice hockey championship, before the 1929 establishment of the Finnish Ice Hockey Association, and arranged the first Pesäpallo matches until 1925.

== Background ==
The SPL has more than 1,000 member clubs and approximately 140,000 registered players. The Finnish Gallup survey has indicated that football is a popular pastime with around 500,000 Finns interested in the sport. The SPL is Finland's largest amateur sports federation.

== Publications ==
The association publishes several magazines, including now-defunct monthly magazine Futari.

== National teams ==
- Men's team
- Under-21 team
- Under-19 team
- Under-17 team
- Women's team
- Women's under-20 team
- Women's under-19 team
- Women's under-17 team
- Men's Futsal team
- Men's under-19 Futsal team
- Women's Futsal team

== Presidents ==
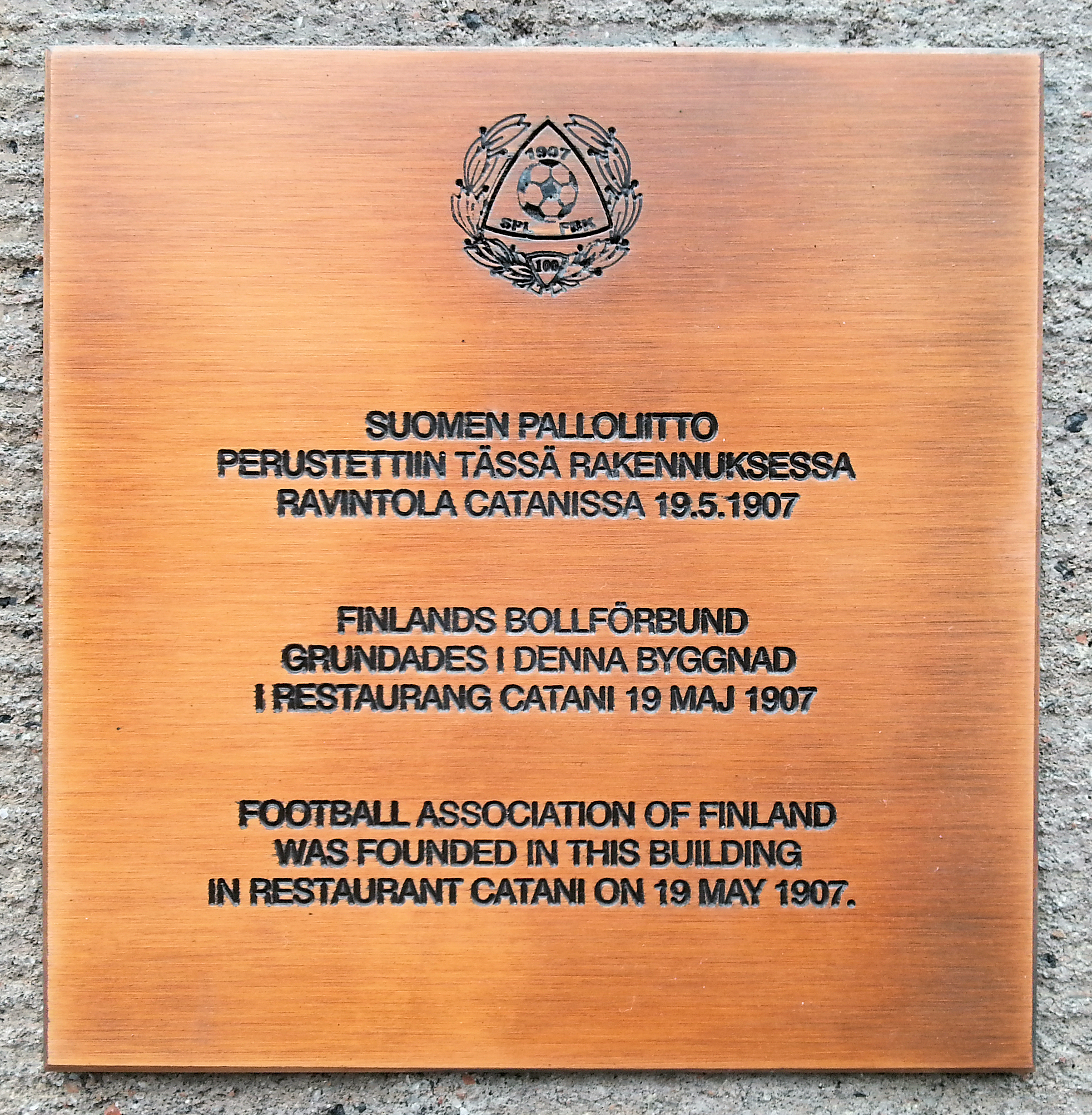
Commemorative plaque in Esplanadi, Helsinki where was Football Association of Finland founded. (Finnish, Swedish and English)

- Walter Flander: 1907–1908
- John Catani: 1909
- Uno Westerholm: 1910–1911
- Carolus Lindberg: 1912
- Walter Qvist: 1913–1917
- Erik von Frenckell: 1918–1952
- Juuso Walden: 1953–1963
- Osmo P. Karttunen: 1963–1974
- Ove H. Rehn: 1974–1975
- Jouko Loikkanen: 1975–1983
- Lauri Pöyhönen: 1983–1987
- Pentti Seppälä: 1987–1997
- Pekka Hämäläinen: 1997–2009
- Sauli Niinistö: 2009–2012
- Markku Lehtola: 2012 (interim)
- Pertti Alaja: 2012–2017
- Markku Lehtola: 2017–2018 (interim)
- Ari Lahti: 2018–present
