= Unitas Sports Club =

Finnish sports club

Sports Club Unitas
- Full name: Sportklubben Unitas
- Founded: 1905
Home colours	Away colours

Sports Club Unitas (Swedish Sportklubben Unitas) was a sports club in Helsinki, Finland. It was founded in 1905 by sportsmen who had left Reipas Helsinki. Unitas was the first club to win the Finnish football championship title in 1908.

Football was the most important sport for Unitas. They played in the first-ever public football match in Finland, against Amateur-Sportverein from Saint Petersburg, Russia in September 1906. In October of the same year, Unitas arranged a nationwide cup format competition in Kaisaniemi, Helsinki. This was the forerunner of the Finnish championship competition, which was played in a cup format in the early years.
