= Aalto University Sports Club =

Finnish football club

- Full name: Aalto-yliopiston urheiluseura, AaltoUS
- Founded: 1903 as Polyteknikkojen voimistelu- ja urheiluseura

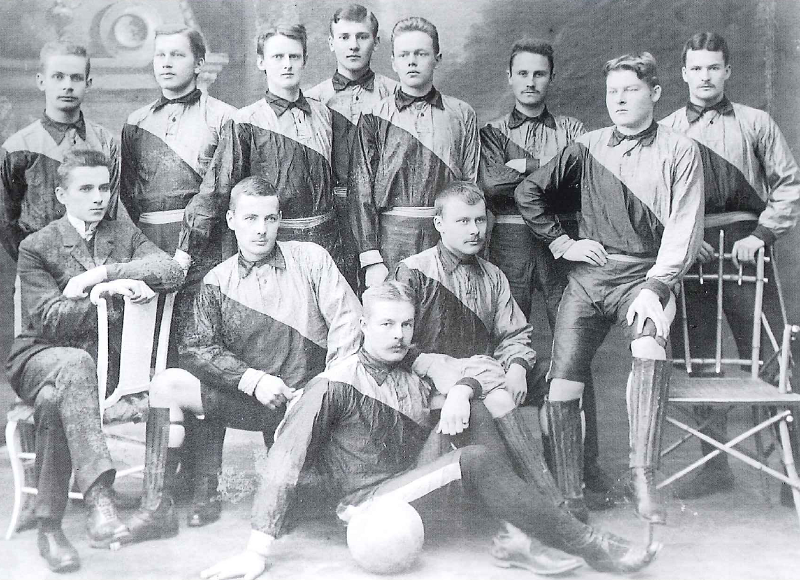
The Polytechnics Sports Club team which won the Finnish championship in football in 1909. Most of these players were also in the bandy team which won the Finnish championship in that sport the same year.

Aalto University Sports Club, AaltoUS, (Finnish Aalto-yliopiston urheiluseura), formerly known as Polyteknikkojen urheiluseura (‘Polytechnics Sports Club’) or PUS, is a Finnish sports club founded in Helsinki in 1903.

The club was the sports club of the Helsinki University of Technology, but as of 29 March 2010, the name has been Aalto-yliopiston urheiluseura, reflecting the merger of the Helsinki University of Technology, the Helsinki School of Economics, and the University of Art and Design Helsinki into what is now the Aalto University.

== History ==
The name of the club was originally Polyteknikkojen voimistelu- ja urheiluseura (‘Polytechnics Gymnastics and Sports Club’), but it was soon changed into Polyteknikkojen urheiluseura. Over the years, its sports have included gymnastics, football, skiing, skating, basketball, volleyball, bandy, rink bandy, and futsal.

Today, Aalto University Sports Club is represented in multiple sports by clubs such as PUS-Basket (basketball), PUS-Hockey (ice hockey) and FLOB (floorball).

== Honours ==
In football, the club participated in some of the first Finnish championship competitions, winning silver in the first year in 1908 and gold in 1909. However, even before this, the club had won the football competition that was arranged in conjunction of the 1907 Finnish Championships in Athletics.

In bandy the club snatched the first two Finnish championships in 1908 and 1909. In 1910 it won silver in this competition.

In pesäpallo (“Finnish baseball”) the club participated in the 1930s in many tournaments, such as the "Pikkumaila" (‘Little Bat’), which was arranged to teams that were not in the top flight of that sport in Finland. The club won this tournament in 1930 and 1931. The club also has won the Finnish Academic Championship in this sport on a few occasions.
