= Viipurin Reipas =

- City: Viipuri (Vyborg)
- Founded: 1928 (hockey operations)

Championships
- Playoff championships: 1: 1928

Viipurin Reipas was a Finnish ice hockey club based in Viipuri (Vyborg). Its ice hockey section was established in 1928. It played in the SM-Sarja for two seasons (1928 and 1932)

Reipas was one of the six first hockey teams that played in the first Finnish Championship in 1928.

== Relocation ==
After the Winter War and the Continuation War during World War II, the city of Viipuri was ceded to Soviet Union and Reipas was forced to move within Finnish borders. In 1945, Reipas relocated to Lahti where it continued, in the new home town of the evacuees, under its original name until renamed to Lahden Reipas. In 1975, Kiekkoreipas was formed to take over hockey operations.

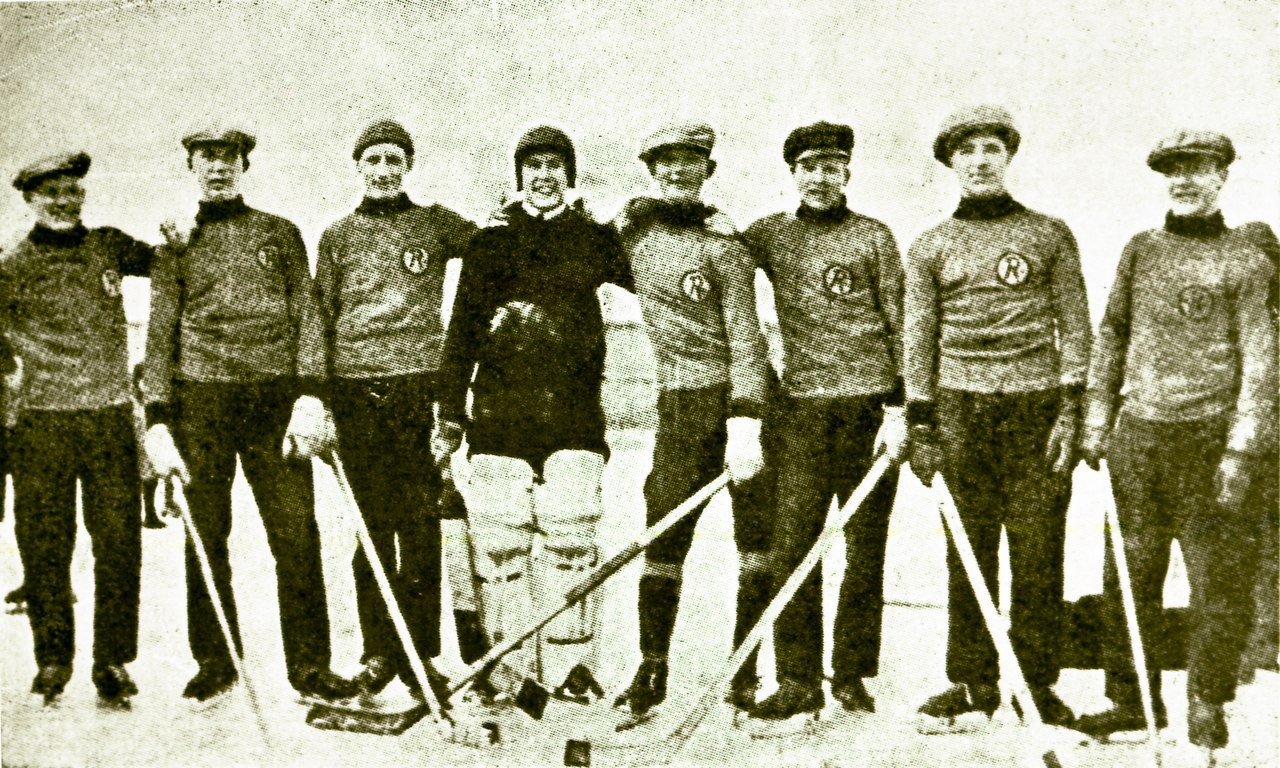
First Finnish Champions in 1928

Viipurin Reipas sports club based in Lahti uses this logo
