= HIFK Soccer rf =

Football club from Helsinki, Finland

HIFK Fotboll
- Full name: Idrottsföreningen Kamraterna, Helsingfors
- Nicknames: IFK; Tähtirinnat (The Star Chested); Stadens stolthet (The City's Pride); Röda (The Reds)
- Founded: 1908; 118 years ago
- Ground: Brahenkenttä Helsinki, Finland
- Capacity: 1,200
- Chairman: Antti Kaiponen
- Head Coach: Telmo Manninen
- League: Kakkonen
- 2025: Kolmonen 2nd of 12
- Website: hifkfotboll.fi

HIFK Fotboll or IFK Helsingfors is the association football section of HIFK, a sports club based in Helsinki, Finland. The men's football team currently competes in the Kakkonen whereas the women's first team is in Naisten Kakkonen.

== Supporters and rivalries ==
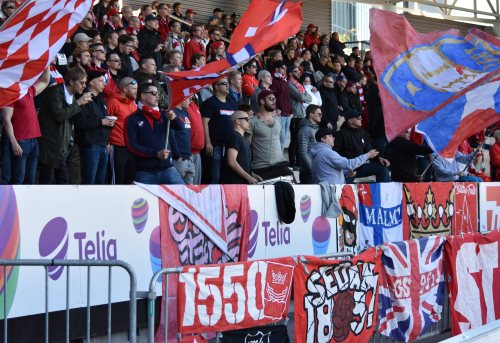
HIFK Fotboll supporters June 2017.

Historically, HIFK was primarily a club for the Swedish-speaking population in Helsinki. Nowadays the club is bilingual. The most renowned supporter group of the club was Stadin Kingit (in English: "the kings of Stadi"). Its name was derived from the common slang nickname for Helsinki (Stadi). Many members attend the handball, bandy and ice hockey matches of HIFK as well.

HIFK’s traditional rivals are HJK with whom they compete in the Stadin Derby.

== History ==
(The following includes the history of the former HIFK football team; HIFK Fotboll)

Idrottsföreningen Kamraterna i Helsingfors was formed on 15 October 1897 by Georges Doubitsky, a 15-year-old student at the Svenska Reallyceum school in Helsinki. In the early years the club specialised in athletics, football and bandy. The football section was established in 1907, the same year that the Football Association of Finland was founded. HIFK's first football game was at the Kaisaniemi ground on 17 May 1908 where the new team lost 1–2 to Unitas.

In those early years HIFK were runners-up in the Mestaruussarja (then played as a cup competition) on 5 occasions in 1909, 1912, 1928 and 1929. In addition in 1912 the Finnish Football team at the Stockholm Olympics comprised a team of HIFK players.

HIFK won their first Finnish championship (Mestaruussarja) in 1930 a feat that they were to repeat on three other occasions in 1931, 1933 and 1937 in a brilliant decade for the club. HIFK also won the Mestaruussarja in 1947, 1959 and 1961. In total HIFK won the Finnish championship on 7 occasions.

HIFK was one of the most successful football sides in Finland until the early 1970s, when the team were relegated from the Mestaruussarja (Finnish Premier League). After 1972 the team spent time in the lower divisions of Finnish football, and at one point found themselves playing in the Nelonen (Fourth Division), the fifth tier of the Finnish football league system, between 1980 and 1983, and later on between 2003 and 2005, and would only return to the first division in 2006, 43 years later.

Since 1930, HIFK have played 33 seasons in the Mestaruussarja (the top tier), 22 seasons in the second tier and 19 seasons in the third tier. Their best spell in recent decades was from 1999 to 2002, when the club participated in the Ykkönen (First Division). However, the club overstretched themselves which resulted in the withdrawal from the Ykkönen at the end of the 2002 season and taking the place of the second team in the Nelonen (Fourth Division) in 2003. More recently, in 2010, they won the third tier, after defeating FC Santa Claus in the promotional playoff match. This saw them return to the second-tier (Ykkönen) of Finnish football for seasons 2011 and 2012, only to be relegated back to Kakkonen after their 2012 season. Back in Kakkonen, HIFK rehired coach Jani Honkavaara, who managed them when they were first promoted back to the Ykkönen. During his second term they returned to the Ykkönen for a third time within the century, when they beat PS Kemi Kings in the promotion playoffs.

HIFK won Ykkönen in 2014, and therefore were automatically promoted into the highest tier of Finnish football, Veikkausliiga. After securing promotion, HIFK announced that they would play their 2015 season home games at the Telia 5G -areena, the ground which belonged to their local rivals HJK Helsinki. In December 2014 HIFK launched a crowdfunding campaign through Invesdor. HIFK aimed to gather 250.000 – 500.000 euros by selling shares of the club valued at 189,70 euros a piece. According to club chairman René Österman, HIFK was in need of funding for the upcoming Veikkausliiga season and crowdfunding gave a chance for the club's supporters to own a part of the club. The campaign ended successfully in January 2015 and HIFK gathered 335.495 euros from 786 investors.

After three seasons in Veikkausliiga, HIFK were relegated to Ykkönen after finishing 11th in 2017 season and losing relegation play-offs against FC Honka on away goals. However, after a successful 2018 campaign in Ykkönen, HIFK was promoted back to Veikkausliiga for the 2019 season.

In the early 2022 Veikkausliiga season, after the newly recruited manager Bernardo Tavares had unexpectedly left the club after the first league match of the season, it was reported that HIFK would name Fabrizio Piccareta the club's new manager. Later he was sidelined in the process and Mixu Paatelainen was appointed. Later it was revealed that HIFK and Piccareta had already signed a deal, and Piccareta sued the club for the breach of contract. The club's sporting director, Mika Lönnström, who was responsible for the manager recruit, was later fired. Piccareta appealed to the FIFA's Court of Arbitration for Sport (CAS), and his complain succeeded, as in May 2023, HIFK was ordered to pay Piccareta €86,000 damages for the breach of contract. HIFK first announced that they will appeal on the decision, but later withdrew their appeal due to lack of money.

During the 2022 and 2023 seasons, the club had repeated financial problems, and had several fund raising campaigns to be able to continue its first team's actions.

On 4 January 2024, after the club finished 6th in the second-tier 2023 Ykkönen, HIFK Fotboll Ab, the limited liability company under which the men's first team operated since 2012, filed for bankruptcy. HIFK/2, which was registered under HIFK Soccer rf and was therefor not affected by HIFK Fotboll ABs bankruptcy, assumed the position of the men's first team in the new fifth tier Kolmonen.

In 2025, HIFK, competing in the fifth tier, started their season fairly well, with the team sitting in 2nd place at the start of June 2025 under manager Telmo Manninen. The clubs fans have stuck by the new HIFK in their hundreds with the club selling 700 season tickets as of the 23 April 2025.
