= HIFK Fotboll =

Former Football club from Helsinki, Finland

- Full name: Idrottsföreningen Kamraterna, Helsingfors
- Nicknames: IFK; Tähtirinnat (The Star Chested); Stadens stolthet (The City's Pride); Röda (The Reds) Stadin Kingit (Helsinki’s Kings)
- Founded: 1897; 129 years ago
- Ground: Töölön pallokenttä Helsinki, Finland
- Capacity: 4000
- Chairman: Jan-Erik Eklöf
- Head Coach: Telmo Manninen
- League: Kakkonen
- 2026: Kakkonen Group A, 4th of 10
- Website: hifkfotboll.fi
Home colours	Away colours

HIFK Fotboll or IFK Helsingfors is the association football section of HIFK, a sports club based in Helsinki, Finland. The men's football team currently competes in the Kakkonen whereas the women's first team is in Naisten Kakkonen. Both teams use Väinämöisen kenttä in Töölö as their home ground.

== History ==
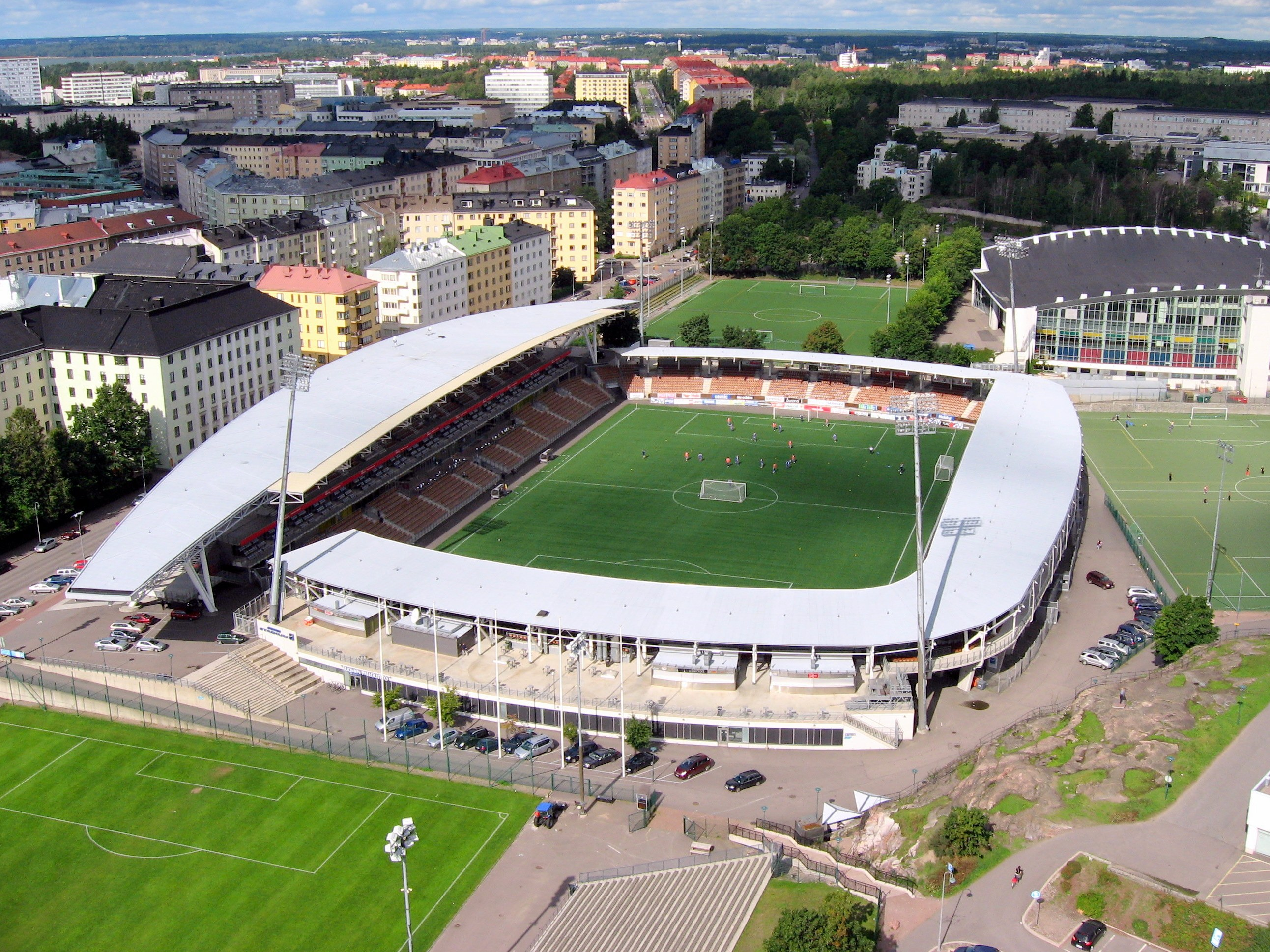
Bolt Arena

Idrottsföreningen Kamraterna i Helsingfors was formed on 15 October 1897 by Georges Doubitsky, a 15-year-old student at the Svenska Reallyceum school in Helsinki. In the early years the club specialised in athletics, football and bandy. The football section was established in 1907, the same year that the Football Association of Finland was founded. HIFK's first football game was at the Kaisaniemi ground on 17 May 1908 where the new team lost 1–2 to Unitas.

In those early years HIFK were runners-up in the Mestaruussarja (then played as a cup competition) on 5 occasions in 1909, 1912, 1928 and 1929. In addition in 1912 the Finnish Football team at the Stockholm Olympics comprised a team of HIFK players.

HIFK won their first Finnish championship (Mestaruussarja) in 1930 a feat that they were to repeat on three other occasions in 1931, 1933 and 1937 in a brilliant decade for the club. HIFK also won the Mestaruussarja in 1947, 1959 and 1961. In total HIFK won the Finnish championship on 7 occasions.

HIFK was one of the most successful football sides in Finland until the early 1970s, when the team were relegated from the Mestaruussarja (Finnish Premier League). After 1972 the team spent time in the lower divisions of Finnish football, and at one point found themselves playing in the Nelonen (Fourth Division), the fifth tier of the Finnish football league system, between 1980 and 1983, and later on between 2003 and 2005, and would only return to the first division in 2006, 43 years later.

Since 1930, HIFK have played 33 seasons in the Mestaruussarja (the top tier), 22 seasons in the second tier and 19 seasons in the third tier. Their best spell in recent decades was from 1999 to 2002, when the club participated in the Ykkönen (First Division). However, the club overstretched themselves which resulted in the withdrawal from the Ykkönen at the end of the 2002 season and taking the place of the second team in the Nelonen (Fourth Division) in 2003. More recently, in 2010, they won the third tier, after defeating FC Santa Claus in the promotional playoff match. This saw them return to the second-tier (Ykkönen) of Finnish football for seasons 2011 and 2012, only to be relegated back to Kakkonen after their 2012 season. Back in Kakkonen, HIFK rehired coach Jani Honkavaara, who managed them when they were first promoted back to the Ykkönen. During his second term they returned to the Ykkönen for a third time within the century, when they beat PS Kemi Kings in the promotion playoffs.

HIFK won Ykkönen in 2014, and therefore were automatically promoted into the highest tier of Finnish football, Veikkausliiga. After securing promotion, HIFK announced that they would play their 2015 season home games at the Telia 5G -areena, the ground which belonged to their local rivals HJK Helsinki. In December 2014 HIFK launched a crowdfunding campaign through Invesdor. HIFK aimed to gather 250.000 – 500.000 euros by selling shares of the club valued at 189,70 euros a piece. According to club chairman René Österman, HIFK was in need of funding for the upcoming Veikkausliiga season and crowdfunding gave a chance for the club's supporters to own a part of the club. The campaign ended successfully in January 2015 and HIFK gathered 335.495 euros from 786 investors.

After three seasons in Veikkausliiga, HIFK were relegated to Ykkönen after finishing 11th in 2017 season and losing relegation play-offs against FC Honka on away goals. However, after a successful 2018 campaign in Ykkönen, HIFK was promoted back to Veikkausliiga for the 2019 season.

In the early 2022 Veikkausliiga season, after the newly recruited manager Bernardo Tavares had unexpectedly left the club after the first league match of the season, it was reported that HIFK would name Fabrizio Piccareta the club's new manager. Later he was sidelined in the process and Mixu Paatelainen was appointed. Later it was revealed that HIFK and Piccareta had already signed a deal, and Piccareta sued the club for the breach of contract. The club's sporting director, Mika Lönnström, who was responsible for the manager recruit, was later fired. Piccareta appealed to the FIFA's Court of Arbitration for Sport (CAS), and his complain succeeded, as in May 2023, HIFK was ordered to pay Piccareta €86,000 damages for the breach of contract. HIFK first announced that they will appeal on the decision, but later withdrew their appeal due to lack of money.

During the 2022 and 2023 seasons, the club had repeated financial problems, and had several fund raising campaigns to be able to continue its first team's actions.

On 4 January 2024, after the club finished 6th in the second-tier 2023 Ykkönen, HIFK Fotboll Ab, the limited liability company under which the men's first team operated since 2012, filed for bankruptcy. HIFK/2, which was registered under HIFK Soccer rf and was therefor not affected by HIFK Fotboll ABs bankruptcy, assumed the position of the men's first team in the new fifth tier Kolmonen.

== European campaigns ==
HIFK participated in the European Cup in the 1960–61 and 1962–63 seasons and played in the UEFA cup in 1971–72.

Season	Competition	Round	Country	Club	Score	Agg.
1960–61	European Cup	Preliminary round	(Sweden)	IFK Malmö	1–3, 1–2	2–5
1962–63	European Cup	First round	(Austria)	Austria Wien	3–5, 0–2	3–7
1971–72	UEFA Cup	First round	(Norway)	Rosenborg	0–3, 0–1	0–4

== Honours ==
- Mestaruussarja
  - Champions (7): 1930, 1931, 1933, 1937, 1947, 1959, 1961
  - Runners-up (7): 1909, 1912, 1928, 1929, 1934, 1935, 1971
- Attendance Record: 10,500 (HIFK – HJK, Telia 5G -areena, 10 August 2016)

== Divisional movements since 1930 ==
- Top Level (32 seasons): 1930–45, 1947–49, 1958–66, 1970–72, 2015–2017, 2019–2022
- Second Level (23 seasons): 1945–46, 1950–57, 1967–69, 1973–74, 1999–02, 2011–12, 2014, 2018, 2023
- Third Level (19 seasons): 1975–78, 1988–98, 2008–10, 2013

== Season to season ==
Season to season

Season	Level	Division	Section	Administration	Position	Movements
1930	Tier 1	A-sarja		Finnish FA (Suomen Palloliitto)	1st	Champions
1931	Tier 1	A-sarja		Finnish FA (Suomen Palloliitto)	1st	Champions
1932	Tier 1	A-sarja		Finnish FA (Suomen Palloliitto)	3rd	
1933	Tier 1	A-sarja		Finnish FA (Suomen Palloliitto)	1st	Champions
1934	Tier 1	A-sarja		Finnish FA (Suomen Palloliitto)	2nd	
1935	Tier 1	A-sarja		Finnish FA (Suomen Palloliitto)	2nd	
1936	Tier 1	Mestaruussarja		Finnish FA (Suomen Palloliitto)	3rd	
1937	Tier 1	Mestaruussarja		Finnish FA (Suomen Palloliitto)	1st	Champions
1938	Tier 1	Mestaruussarja		Finnish FA (Suomen Palloliitto)	6th	
1939	Tier 1	Mestaruussarja		Finnish FA (Suomen Palloliitto)	4th	
1940–41	Tier 1	Mestaruussarja		Finnish FA (Suomen Palloliitto)	4th	
1943–44	Tier 1	Mestaruussarja		Finnish FA (Suomen Palloliitto)	5th	
1945	Tier 1	Mestaruussarja	Group 1	Finnish FA (Suomen Palloliitto)	5th	
1945–46	Tier 2	Suomensarja (First Division)		Finnish FA (Suomen Pallolitto)	1st	Promoted
1946–47	Tier 1	Mestaruussarja		Finnish FA (Suomen Palloliitto)	2nd	Championship Series 1st, Champions
1947–48	Tier 1	Mestaruussarja		Finnish FA (Suomen Palloliitto)	2nd	
1948	Tier 1	Mestaruussarja		Finnish FA (Suomen Palloliitto)	10th	
1949	Tier 1	Mestaruussarja		Finnish FA (Suomen Palloliitto)	9th	Relegated
1950	Tier 2	Suomensarja (First Division)	West Group	Finnish FA (Suomen Pallolitto)	2nd	
1951	Tier 2	Suomensarja (First Division)	West Group	Finnish FA (Suomen Pallolitto)	6th	
1952	Tier 2	Suomensarja (First Division)	East Group	Finnish FA (Suomen Pallolitto)	4th	
1953	Tier 2	Suomensarja (First Division)	East Group	Finnish FA (Suomen Pallolitto)	4th	
1954	Tier 2	Suomensarja (First Division)	East Group	Finnish FA (Suomen Pallolitto)	5th	
1955	Tier 2	Suomensarja (First Division)	East Group	Finnish FA (Suomen Pallolitto)	8th	
1956	Tier 2	Suomensarja (First Division)	East Group	Finnish FA (Suomen Pallolitto)	3rd	
1957	Tier 2	Suomensarja (First Division)	East Group	Finnish FA (Suomen Pallolitto)	1st	Promoted
1958	Tier 1	Mestaruussarja		Finnish FA (Suomen Palloliitto)	3rd	
1959	Tier 1	Mestaruussarja		Finnish FA (Suomen Palloliitto)	1st	Champions
1960	Tier 1	Mestaruussarja		Finnish FA (Suomen Palloliitto)	5th	
1961	Tier 1	Mestaruussarja		Finnish FA (Suomen Palloliitto)	1st	Champions
1962	Tier 1	Mestaruussarja		Finnish FA (Suomen Palloliitto)	7th	
1963	Tier 1	Mestaruussarja		Finnish FA (Suomen Palloliitto)	4th	
1964	Tier 1	Mestaruussarja		Finnish FA (Suomen Palloliitto)	6th	
1965	Tier 1	Mestaruussarja		Finnish FA (Suomen Palloliitto)	5th	
1966	Tier 1	Mestaruussarja		Finnish FA (Suomen Palloliitto)	10th	Relegated
1967	Tier 2	Suomensarja (First Division)	East Group	Finnish FA (Suomen Pallolitto)	4th	
1968	Tier 2	Suomensarja (First Division)	South Group	Finnish FA (Suomen Pallolitto)	4th	
1969	Tier 2	Suomensarja (First Division)	East Group	Finnish FA (Suomen Pallolitto)	1st	Promotion Group 2nd, promoted
1970	Tier 1	Mestaruussarja		Finnish FA (Suomen Palloliitto)	3rd	
1971	Tier 1	Mestaruussarja		Finnish FA (Suomen Palloliitto)	2nd	
1972	Tier 1	Mestaruussarja		Finnish FA (Suomen Palloliitto)	10th	Relegated
1973	Tier 2	I divisioona (First Division)		Finnish FA (Suomen Pallolitto)	4th	
1974	Tier 2	I divisioona (First Division)		Finnish FA (Suomen Pallolitto)	11th	Relegated
1975	Tier 3	II Divisioona (Second Division)	East Group	Finnish FA (Suomen Pallolitto)	6th	
1976	Tier 3	II Divisioona (Second Division)	East Group	Finnish FA (Suomen Pallolitto)	4th	
1977	Tier 3	II Divisioona (Second Division)	East Group	Finnish FA (Suomen Pallolitto)	9th	
1978	Tier 3	II Divisioona (Second Division)	East Group	Finnish FA (Suomen Pallolitto)	11th	Relegated
1979	Tier 4	III divisioona (Third Division)	Section 2	Helsinki & Uusimaa	11th	Relegated
1980	Tier 5	IV divisioona (Fourth Division)	Section 4	Helsinki & Uusimaa	8th	
1981	Tier 5	IV divisioona (Fourth Division)	Section 1	Helsinki & Uusimaa	7th	
1982	Tier 5	IV divisioona (Fourth Division)	Section 2	Helsinki & Uusimaa	4th	
1983	Tier 5	IV divisioona (Fourth Division)	Section 3	Helsinki & Uusimaa	1st	Promoted via play-offs
1984	Tier 4	III divisioona (Third Division)	Section 2	Helsinki & Uusimaa	1st	Promotion play-offs
1985	Tier 4	III divisioona (Third Division)	Section 1	Helsinki & Uusimaa	3rd	
1986	Tier 4	III divisioona (Third Division)	Section 2	Helsinki & Uusimaa	2nd	
1987	Tier 4	III divisioona (Third Division)	Section 2	Helsinki & Uusimaa	1st	Promoted
1988	Tier 3	II Divisioona (Second Division)	West Group	Finnish FA (Suomen Pallolitto)	5th	
1989	Tier 3	II Divisioona (Second Division)	East Group	Finnish FA (Suomen Pallolitto)	2nd	
1990	Tier 3	II Divisioona (Second Division)	East Group	Finnish FA (Suomen Pallolitto)	2nd	
1991	Tier 3	II Divisioona (Second Division)	East Group	Finnish FA (Suomen Pallolitto)	4th	
1992	Tier 3	II Divisioona (Second Division)	East Group	Finnish FA (Suomen Pallolitto)	4th	
1993	Tier 3	II Divisioona (Second Division)	East Group	Finnish FA (Suomen Pallolitto)	4th	FC HIFK
1994	Tier 3	Kakkonen (Second Division)	South Group	Finnish FA (Suomen Pallolitto)	4th	FC HIFK
1995	Tier 3	Kakkonen (Second Division)	South Group	Finnish FA (Suomen Pallolitto)	8th	FC HIFK
1996	Tier 3	Kakkonen (Second Division)	South Group	Finnish FA (Suomen Pallolitto)	8th	FC HIFK
1997	Tier 3	Kakkonen (Second Division)	East Group	Finnish FA (Suomen Pallolitto)	2nd	FC HIFK
1998	Tier 3	Kakkonen (Second Division)	East Group	Finnish FA (Suomen Pallolitto)	2nd	FC HIFK
1999	Tier 2	Ykkönen (First Division)	South Group	Finnish FA (Suomen Pallolitto)	6th	FC HIFK – Relegation Group South – 8th
2000	Tier 2	Ykkönen (First Division)	South Group	Finnish FA (Suomen Pallolitto)	8th	FC HIFK – Relegation Group South – 7th
2001	Tier 2	Ykkönen (First Division)	South Group	Finnish FA (Suomen Pallolitto)	6th	FC HIFK
2002	Tier 2	Ykkönen (First Division)	South Group	Finnish FA (Suomen Pallolitto)	7th	FC HIFK – Relegation Group South – 7th – Play-offs
2003	Tier 5	Nelonen (Fourth Division)	Section 1	Uusimaa (SPL Helsinki)	5th	
2004	Tier 5	Nelonen (Fourth Division)	Section 1	Uusimaa (SPL Helsinki)	2nd	c
2006	Tier 4	Kolmonen (Third Division)	Section 3	Helsinki & Uusimaa (SPL Helsinki)	2nd	
2007	Tier 4	Kolmonen (Third Division)	Section 2	Helsinki & Uusimaa (SPL Helsinki)	1st	Promoted
2008	Tier 3	Kakkonen (Second Division)	Group B	Finnish FA (Suomen Pallolitto)	7th	
2009	Tier 3	Kakkonen (Second Division)	Group A	Finnish FA (Suomen Pallolitto)	7th	
2010	Tier 3	Kakkonen (Second Division)	Group A	Finnish FA (Suomen Pallolitto)	1st	Play-offs, promoted
2011	Tier 2	Ykkönen (First Division)		Finnish FA (Suomen Pallolitto)	9th	
2012	Tier 2	Ykkönen (First Division)		Finnish FA (Suomen Pallolitto)	10th	Relegated
2013	Tier 3	Kakkonen (Second Division)	East Group	Finnish FA (Suomen Pallolitto)	1st	Play-offs, promoted
2014	Tier 2	Ykkönen (First Division)		Finnish FA (Suomen Pallolitto)	1st	Promoted to Veikkausliiga
2015	Tier 1	Veikkausliiga		Finnish FA (Suomen Palloliitto)	7th	
2016	Tier 1	Veikkausliiga		Finnish FA (Suomen Palloliitto)	10th	
2017	Tier 1	Veikkausliiga		Finnish FA (Suomen Palloliitto)	11th	Play-offs, relegated
2018	Tier 2	Ykkönen (First Division)		Finnish FA (Suomen Pallolitto)	1st	Promoted
2019	Tier 1	Veikkausliiga		Finnish FA (Suomen Palloliitto)	7th	
2020	Tier 1	Veikkausliiga		Finnish FA (Suomen Palloliitto)	8th	
2021	Tier 1	Veikkausliiga		Finnish FA (Suomen Palloliitto)	6th	
2022	Tier 1	Veikkausliiga		Finnish FA (Suomen Palloliitto)	12th	Relegated
2023	Tier 2	Ykkönen (First Division)		Finnish FA (Suomen Pallolitto)	6th	Bankruptcy
2024	Tier 5	Kolmonen		Uusimaa (SPL Helsinki)		

- 36 seasons in Veikkausliiga
- 23 seasons in Ykkönen
- 19 seasons in Kakkonen
- 7 seasons in Kolmonen
- 7 seasons in Nelonen

== Supporters and rivalries ==
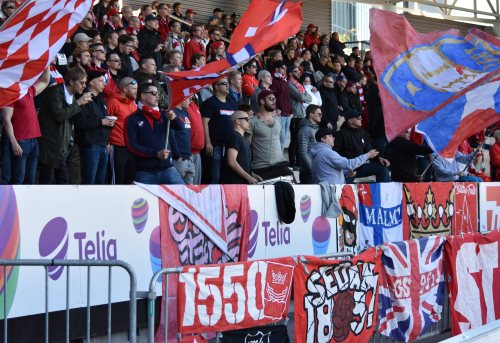
HIFK Fotboll supporters June 2017.

Historically, HIFK was primarily a club for the Swedish-speaking population in Helsinki. Nowadays the club is bilingual. The most renowned supporter group of the club was Stadin Kingit (in English: "the kings of Stadi"). Its name was derived from the common slang nickname for Helsinki (Stadi). Many members attend the handball, bandy and ice hockey matches of HIFK as well.

The single most important fixture for HIFK supporters is against the major local rivals, HJK. The fixture is commonly known as the Stadin derby and was last played during the Veikkausliiga season of 2022.

== Club structure ==
HIFK Fotboll operate a large number of teams including 3 men's teams, 3 women's teams, 1 men's veterans team, 16 boys' teams and 5 girls' teams.

- HIFK competes in Group B of Kolmonen (Fifth tier) administered by the SPL Uusimaa.
- HIFK / 3 competes in Group 4 of Vitonen (Seventh tier) administered by the SPL Uusimaa.

Updated as of season 2024.

== Players ==
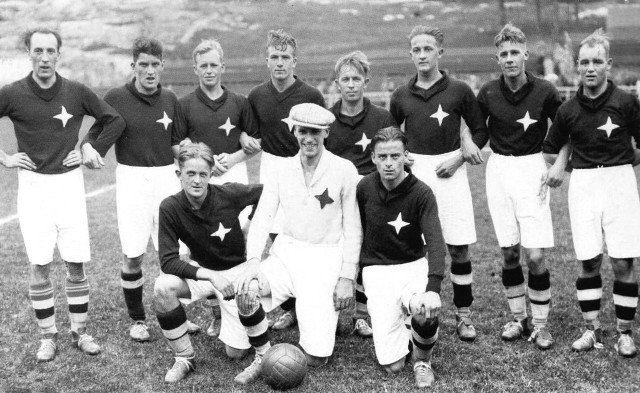
HIFK football players in 1930s

As of 24 July 2024

=== Current squad ===
Note: Flags indicate national team as defined under FIFA eligibility rules; some limited exceptions apply. Players may hold more than one non-FIFA nationality.

No.	Pos.	Nation	Player
2	DF	FIN	Elias Kaukamo
3	DF	FIN	Roger Prezioso
4	DF	FIN	Leo Halme
5	FW	FIN	Leevi Hoppania
6	FW	FIN	Nicolas Prezioso
7	DF	FIN	Niko Turunen
8	FW	FIN	Dolynnyi Nazar
9	DF	FIN	Peik Westerlund
10	FW	FIN	Said Mijoc
11	MF	FIN	Robin Leskinen
14	MF	FIN	Nelson Holmberg
15	MF	FIN	Lotus Kurkio
16	MF	FIN	Fonkah Alakotila
17	DF	FIN	Arian Ahmadi
18	FW	FIN	Lauri Korkeila
19	MF	FIN	Noa Kiema
20	MF	FIN	Adam Oyegoke
21	DF	FIN	Seifedine Eshrouk-Maharzah
22	GK	FIN	Nikke Vesterinen
22	FW	FIN	Danjaal Hamzaaghaei

No.	Pos.	Nation	Player
24	FW	FIN	Zakaria El Hayani El Mourabi
25	GK	FIN	Alex Hendren
27	DF	FIN	Robert Razmus
27	GK	FIN	Teddy Schalin
28	FW	FIN	Guled Hasan Farah
30	MF	FIN	Aatos Rajanummi
31	FW	FIN	Daniel Eidet
32	GK	FIN	Olli Hyvärinen
33	DF	FIN	Veikko Pelkonen
45	MF	FIN	Markus Juolahti
45	DF	FIN	Roope Seppänen
—	GK	GAM	Sam Jammeh
—	FW	FIN	Antti Ulmanen
—	DF	FIN	Tomi Kurvinen
—	DF	FIN	Eero Karjalainen
—	FW	BRA	Tiquinho
—	MF	FIN	Arttu Auranen
—	MF	FIN	Eetu Puro
—	MF	FIN	Rico Finnäs
—	MF	FIN	Moshtagh Yaghoubi

== Management and boardroom ==
As of 24 July 2024

Name	Role
(Finland) Alex Maylett	Head coach
Anas Abdi	Assistant coach
Umid Dibachy	Assistant coach
Tomi Maanoja	Assistant coach
Joona Haavisto	Team manager
Aapo Haavisto	Doctor

=== Boardroom ===
Name	Role
(Finland) Jan-Erik Eklöf	Chairman
(Finland) Viktor Fagerudd	Vice-Chairman
(Finland) Janne Räsänen	Member
(Finland) Janne Rasinkangas	Member
(Finland) Hanna Khalili	Member
(Finland) Dan Nordström	Member
