= Mosawer Ahadi =

Afghan footballer (born 2000)

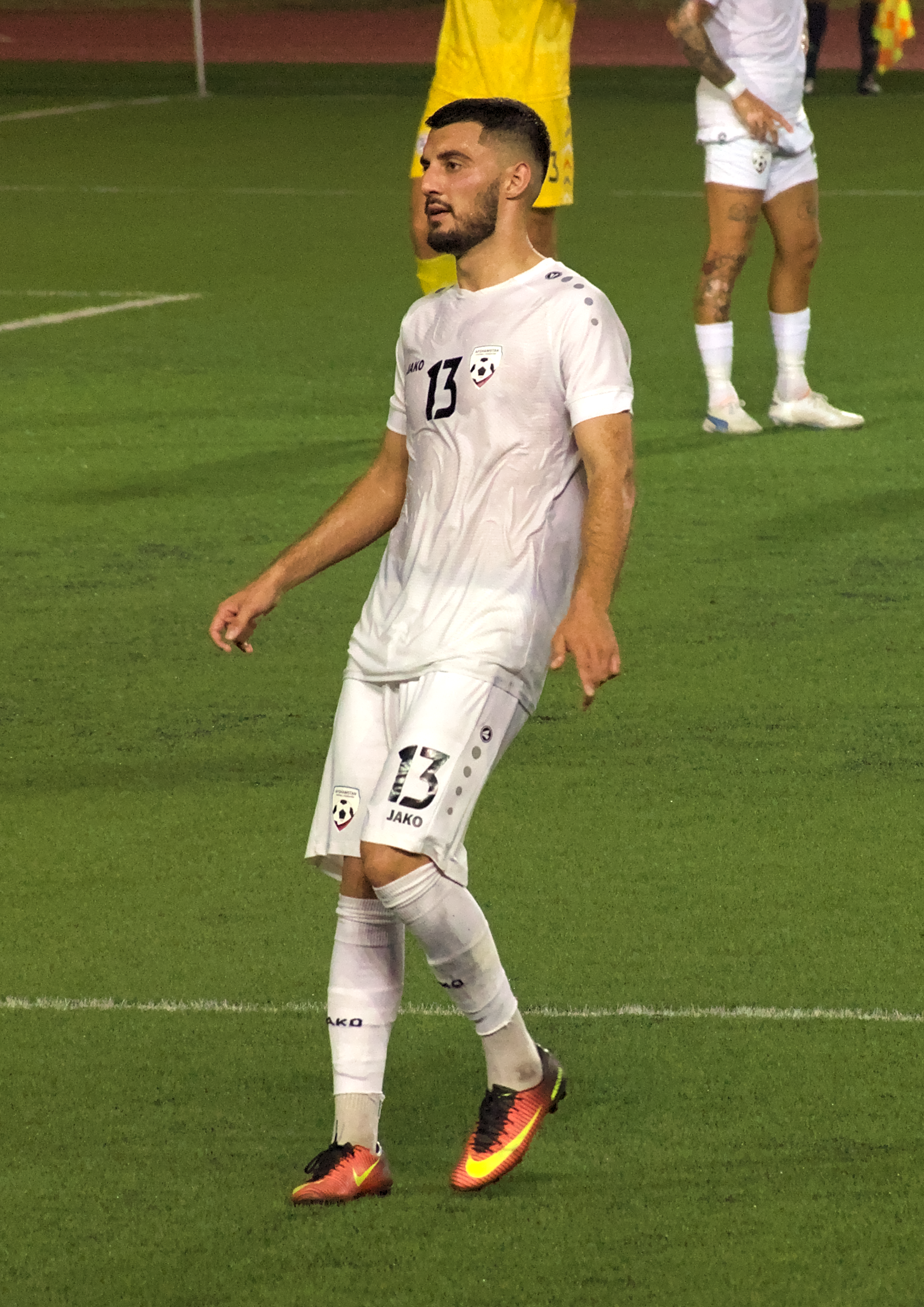
- Ahadi playing for the Afghanistan national team in 2023

Personal information
- Date of birth: 8 March 2000 (age 26)
- Place of birth: Mazar-i-Sharif, Afghanistan
- Height: 1.76 m (5 ft 9 in)
- Position: Winger

Team information
- Current team: HIFK
- Number: 77

Youth career
- 2012: MiKi
- 2014: KOPSE
- 2015: Legirus Inter
- 2016–2017: HJK Helsinki

Senior career*
Years	Team	Apps	(Gls)
2017	PKKU	19	(3)
2018	Honka	1	(0)
2018	Honka II	12	(2)
2018	→ EIF (loan)	8	(0)
2019	JäPS	6	(1)
2020	Espoo	13	(4)
2021–2022	HIFK	24	(0)
2022	EIF	8	(0)
2023	HIFK	24	(4)
2024	Balzan	8	(0)
2024–2025	Abu Muslim		
2025	JäPS	11	(2)
2025	Bashkimi	0	(0)
2025	JäPS	5	(0)
2025–2026	Abu Muslim		
2026–	HIFK	8	(0)

International career^{‡}
2017	Finland U17	6	(2)
2017–2018	Finland U18	3	(1)
2023–	Afghanistan	9	(0)
- * Club domestic league appearances and goals as of 7 November 2026 ‡ National team caps and goals as of 2 December 2024

Mosawer Ahadi (Dari: مصور احدی; born 8 March 2000) is an Afghan professional footballer who plays as a winger for Kakkonen club HIFK and the Afghanistan national football team.

== Club career ==
=== Palloherko Keski-Uusimaa ===
Ahadi's first senior club was PKKU in the Kakkonen. He made his senior league debut for the club on 29 April 2017 in a 3–2 away victory over PEPO. He was subbed off after 68 minutes, to be replaced by Phondo Wälläri. He scored his first league goal for the club on 13 June 2017 in a 1–1 home draw with Klubi 04. His goal, scored in the 61st minute, made the score 1-1.

=== Honka ===
In December 2017, Ahadi moved to FC Honka in the Veikkausliiga, arriving alongside Felix Ferahyan and Youness Rahimi. He made his league debut for the club on 14 May 2018 in a short stint off the bench against VPS. He was subbed on for Kasperi Liikonen in the 88th minute. For the remainder of the season, Ahadi played with the Honka youth team, Honka Akatemia in the Kakkonen. He scored two goals in Honka Akatemia's 6–0 victory over KK-46 on 1 June 2018.

After coming back from loan at Ekenäs, Ahadi signed a contract extension with Honka for the 2019 season.

=== Ekenäs (loan) ===
In July 2018, Ahadi was loaned out to Ekenäs in the Ykkönen. He made his league debut for the club on 28 July 2018 in a 3–0 away victory over Jaro. He was subbed on for Hanson Boakai in the 77th minute.

=== HIFK ===
On 5 February 2021, he signed with HIFK for the 2021 season. In December 2021, the contract was extended for the 2022 season, with an option for 2023.

=== Return to EIF ===
On 12 August 2022, Ahadi returned to EIF until the end of the season.

=== Return to HIFK, move to Balzan ===
On 7 December 2022, Ahadi once again signed with HIFK for the 2023 season, but was released in 2024. In July 2024, he was signed by the Maltese Premier League side Balzan.

=== Abu Muslim ===
On 30 October 2024, Ahadi signed with Abu Muslim in the Afghanistan Champions League and returned to his country of birth.

=== JäPS ===
In February 2025 he returned to Finland, signing for JäPS.

== International career ==
He made his first appearance for Finland U17s on 16 January 2017 in a 3–3 draw with Belarus U17s. He made two appearances in Finland's UEFA European U17 Championship qualification run. One came in a 6–2 away defeat to Germany U17s, and the other in a 5–0 away victory against Armenia U17s, in which he scored a goal in the 54th minute.

He made his senior debut for Afghanistan in 2023.

== Career statistics ==
=== Club ===
As of 2 December 2024

Appearances and goals by club, season and competition
Club	Season	League			National cup (Note: Includes Suomen Cup)		League cup (Note: Includes Finnish League Cup and Ykköscup)		Other		Total	
Club	Season	Division	Apps	Goals	Apps	Goals	Apps	Goals	Apps	Goals	Apps	Goals
Legirus Inter	2015	Kolmonen	0	0	–		–		1 (Note: Includes UEFA Regions' Cup)	0	1	0
PKKU	2017	Kakkonen	19	3	1	0	–		–		20	3
Honka	2018	Veikkausliiga	1	0	4	1	–		–		5	1
Honka Akatemia	2018	Kakkonen	12	2	–		–		–		12	2
EIF (loan)	2018	Ykkönen	8	0	–		–		–		8	0
EIF Akademi (loan)	2018	Kolmonen	1	0	–		–		–		1	0
JäPS	2019	Kakkonen	6	1	–		–		–		6	1
JäPS II	2019	Kolmonen	2	0	–		–		–		2	0
Espoo	2020	Kakkonen	13	4	–		–		–		13	4
HIFK	2021	Veikkausliiga	16	0	3	0	–		–		19	0
HIFK	2022	Veikkausliiga	8	0	2	0	3	0	–		13	0
HIFK	Total		24	0	5	0	3	0	0	0	32	0
EIF	2022	Ykkönen	9	0	–		–		–		9	0
HIFK	2023	Ykkönen	24	4	3	0	5	1	–		32	5
Balzan	2024–25	Maltese Premier League	8	0	0	0	–		–		8	0
Abu Muslim	2025	Afghanistan Champions League										
JäPS	2025	Ykkösliiga	0	0	0	0	0	0	–		0	0
Career total			127	14	13	1	8	1	1	0	149	16

=== International ===
As of match played 11 June 2024

Afghanistan
Year	Apps	Goals
2023	5	0
2024	4	0
Total	9	0
