= Laurikainen =

Laurikainen is a Finnish surname. Notable people with the surname include:

- Eetu Laurikainen (born 1993), Finnish ice hockey player
- Joonas Laurikainen (born 1983), Finnish footballer
- Mika Laurikainen (born 1963), Finnish footballer
