= Ivan Piñol =

Spanish football coach (born 1982)

Personal information
- Full name: Ivan Piñol Zoroa
- Date of birth: 12 February 1982 (age 44)
- Place of birth: El Vendrell, Catalonia, Spain

Team information
- Current team: TPS (manager)

Managerial career
- Years: Team
- 2016: Rayo OKC (assistant)
- 2017–2018: Irtysh (assistant)
- 2020: NorthEast United (assistant)
- 2021: KuFu-98
- 2021–2022: KuPS (assistant)
- 2022: Hammarby (assistant)
- 2024: Lahti (assistant)
- 2025–: TPS

Ivan Piñol Zoroa (born 12 February 1982) is a Spanish football coach who is currently the head coach of Finnish club TPS in the Veikkausliiga.

== Career ==
Piñol started coaching in the youth academy of Barcelona in 2010. During the 2014–15 season, he worked in the academy of South African Premiership club Mamelodi Sundowns.

In August 2016, he started as an assistant coach of Rayo OKC, in a coaching staff of Gerard Nus. In December 2017, he followed Nus to Kazakh side Irtysh.

After a brief stint with Indian Super League club NorthEast United, Piñol moved to Finland and joined Kuopion Palloseura organisation. He worked as the head coach of the club's reserve team KuFu-98 and as an assistant coach of the KuPS first team under manager Simo Valakari in the Finnish Veikkausliiga. In February 2022, he left KuPS for Hammarby.

In November 2023, he joined the coaching staff of Lahti, but due to personal family reasons, he was forced to leave the club in June 2024.

In January 2025, Piñol was named the head coach of Ykkösliiga club TPS. In his first season, he led the club to promotion to the Veikkausliiga. Following this success, in November 2025, he signed a contract extension keeping him at the club until the end of the 2027 season.

== Managerial statistics ==
As of 20 January 2026

Team	Nat	From	To	Record				
Team	Nat	From	To	G	W	D	L	Win %
KuFu-98	(Finland)	1 May 2021	31 December 2021	22	7	5	10	31.82
TPS	(Finland)	20 January 2025	Present	38	23	8	7	60.53
Total				60	30	13	17	50.00
