= Eetu Puro =

Finnish footballer (born 1997)

Personal information
- Date of birth: 3 July 1997 (age 29)
- Place of birth: Vantaa, Finland
- Height: 1.77 m (5 ft 10 in)
- Position: Midfielder

Team information
- Current team: HIFK
- Number: 4

Youth career
- VJS
- PK-35 Vantaa

Senior career*
Years	Team	Apps	(Gls)
2016	VJS	2	(1)
2017–2018	KäPa	31	(1)
2019	VJS	19	(5)
2020	VPS	20	(0)
2021	PK-35	25	(2)
2022–2023	HIFK	34	(1)
2024	Ekenäs IF	20	(0)
2025–	HIFK	23	(4)
- * Club domestic league appearances and goals as of 7 November 2026

Eetu Puro (born 3 July 1997) is a Finnish professional footballer who plays as a midfielder for HIFK.

== Club career ==
On 7 July 2019, while playing with VJS in a third-tier Kakkonen match against Sudet, Puro received a red card and was sent out for verbally attacking a referee.
