= Makkabi Helsinki =

Jewish Finnish sports club

Makkabi Helsinki is a Finnish Jewish sports club in Helsinki, Finland. It is the oldest Jewish sports club in the world that has an uninterrupted history. It was founded in 1906 with the name “Stjärnan”' (Swedish for ‘the star’). The current name was adopted in 1936.

In association football, the club played in the top-flight competition Mestaruussarja in 1930, after that on lower levels. These days the main sports are bowling, futsal, basketball and floorball. The club celebrated its centennial in November, 2006.

The president of the club, Dennis Mattsoff, has mentioned Elias Katz as the most celebrated athlete to have represented this club. Katz won gold in the 1924 Olympic Games in Paris with Paavo Nurmi and Ville Ritola in the 3000m team race. He also won a silver medal in the 3000 meter steeple chase race.

According to Mattsoff, the objective of the club is to strengthen the Jewish identity of the community in Helsinki, and to help the youngsters acquire also values other than those relating to competitive sports.

The club had its worst setback in history at the Helsinki Olympic Stadium on 21 June 1938, when its athlete Abraham Tokazier participated in a 100 metre race. He was officially declared to have come fourth, but on the basis of photographs and other pieces contemporary of evidence, it has been surmised that in reality he won the race. A possible reason for foul play on the part of the organisers was that among the spectators there was a delegation from Nazi Germany.

The Finnish Athletics Federation issued an apology for the incident 75 years later in September 2013, and the final result of the competition was corrected on 4 October 2013: Tokazier was chosen as the winner of the competition.

== Season to season ==
| Season | Level | Division | Section | Administration | Position | Movements |
|---|---|---|---|---|---|---|
| 1930 | Tier 1 | A-Sarja (Premier League) | | Finnish FA (Suomen Pallolitto) | 7th | Relegated |
| 1931 | Tier 3 | Piirinsarja (District League) | | Helsinki (SPL Helsinki) | | Qualifiers for B-Sarja |
| 1932 | | | | | | |
| 1933 | Tier 2 | B-Sarja (Second Division) | | Finnish FA (Suomen Pallolitto) | 5th | |
| 1934-35 | | District Leagues | | | | |
| 1936 | Tier 3 | Maakuntasarja (Province League) | West | Finnish FA (Suomen Pallolitto) | | Promotion Playoff |
| 1937-39 | | District Leagues | | | | |
| 1940-44 | | | | | | Did not participate |
| 1945-46 | Tier 3 | Maakuntasarja (Province League) | Helsinki Group 2 | Finnish FA (Suomen Pallolitto) | 6th | |
| 1946-47 | Tier 3 | Maakuntasarja (Province League) | Helsinki Group 2 | Finnish FA (Suomen Pallolitto) | 4th | |
| 1947-48 | Tier 3 | Maakuntasarja (Province League) | Helsinki Group 1 | Finnish FA (Suomen Pallolitto) | 5th | Relegated |
| 1948 | Tier 4 | Piirinsarja (District League) | | Helsinki (SPL Helsinki) | | Promotion Playoff |
| 1949 | Tier 4 | Piirinsarja (District League) | | Helsinki (SPL Helsinki) | | Promotion Playoff |
| 1950 | Tier 4 | Piirinsarja (District League) | West Group | Helsinki (SPL Helsinki) | | Promotion Playoff |
| 1951 | | | | | | |
| 1952 | Tier 4 | Piirinsarja (District League) | | Helsinki (SPL Helsinki) | | Promotion Playoff |
| 1953 | Tier 4 | Piirinsarja (District League) | | Helsinki (SPL Helsinki) | | Promotion Playoff |
| 1954-56 | | District Leagues | | | | |
| 1957 | Tier 4 | Aluesarja (Fourth Division) | Group 1 Helsinki | Helsinki (SPL Helsinki) | 5th | Relegated |
| 1958-71 | | District Leagues | | | | |
| 1972 | Tier 5 | Piirinsarja (District League) | Group 4 | Helsinki District (SPL Helsinki) | 5th | Promoted |
| 1973 | Tier 5 | IV Divisioona (Fourth Division) | Group 3 | Finnish FA (Suomen Pallolitto) | 6th | |
| 1974 | Tier 5 | IV Divisioona (Fourth Division) | Group 2 | Finnish FA (Suomen Pallolitto) | 6th | |
| 1975 | Tier 5 | IV Divisioona (Fourth Division) | Group 4 | Finnish FA (Suomen Pallolitto) | 8th | Relegated |
| 1976-80 | | District Leagues | | | | |
| 1981 | Tier 5 | IV Divisioona (Fourth Division) | Group 3 | Finnish FA (Suomen Pallolitto) | 7th | |
| 1982 | Tier 5 | IV Divisioona (Fourth Division) | Group 1 | Finnish FA (Suomen Pallolitto) | 10th | |
| 1983 | Tier 5 | IV Divisioona (Fourth Division) | Group 2 | Finnish FA (Suomen Pallolitto) | 12th | Relegated |
| 1984 | Tier 6 | V Divisioona (Fifth Division) | Group 2 | Helsinki District (SPL Helsinki) | | |

- 1 season in Tier 1
- 1 season in Tier 2
- 5 seasons in Tier 3
- 6 seasons in Tier 4
- 7 seasons in Tier 5
- 1 season in Tier 6
