= Jani Tuomala =

Finnish footballer (born 1977)

Personal information
- Date of birth: 3 February 1977 (age 49)
- Place of birth: Porvoo, Finland
- Height: 1.88 m (6 ft 2 in)
- Position: Goalkeeper

Senior career*
Years	Team	Apps	(Gls)
1997–1998	FinnPa	9	(0)
1999–2000	TPS	35	(0)
2001	Lahti	5	(0)
2003–2005	TPS	77	(0)
2006	MyPa	2	(0)
2007–2008	IF Sylvia	?	(?)
2009–2010	TPS	2	(0)
2011–2013	Pallo-Iirot	71	(0)
2014	TPS	1	(0)
- * Club domestic league appearances and goals as of 17 February 2011

Jani Tuomala (born 3 February 1977) is a Finnish former footballer, who is currently a team manager of Turun Palloseura (TPS) in Ykkösliiga.
