= Joonas Laurikainen =

Finnish footballer (born 1983)

Personal information
- Date of birth: 19 May 1983 (age 43)
- Place of birth: Turku, Finland
- Height: 1.87 m (6 ft 1 1/2 in)
- Position: Midfielder

Team information
- Current team: Ilves (U19 manager)

Youth career
- TPS Turku

Senior career*
Years	Team	Apps	(Gls)
2004	Pallo-Iirot		
2005	Inter Turku	3	(0)
2006	Mora		
2007	Hudiksvall		
2008	KaaPo	36	(5)
2008–2009	Jaro	36	(5)
2010–2013	Jazz Pori		

Managerial career
- 2017: TPS (U19)
- 2019–2020: TPS (assistant)
- 2020: TPS (caretaker)
- 2020: TPS (assistant)
- 2021–: Ilves (U19)
- * Club domestic league appearances and goals

Joonas Laurikainen (born 19 May 1983) is a Finnish football coach and a former player. He manages the Under-19 squad of Ilves.

== Career ==
He represented FF Jaro in the Veikkausliiga, the Finnish premier division of football.

== Personal life ==
His father Mika Laurikainen is also a football coach.
