= Arttu Auranen =

Finnish footballer (born 1999)

Personal information
- Date of birth: 2 September 1999 (age 27)
- Place of birth: Finland
- Height: 1.88 m (6 ft 2 in)
- Position: Central midfielder

Team information
- Current team: HIFK
- Number: 15

Youth career
- –2017: Espoo

Senior career*
Years	Team	Apps	(Gls)
2018–2029	Espoo II	11	(3)
2018–2029	Espoo	28	(0)
2020	Lahti	3	(1)
2020	Reipas Lahti	10	(2)
2021–2022	PK-35	25	(0)
2024	KäPa	5	(0)
2024	→ NJS (loan)	8	(0)
2025–	HIFK	35	(7)
- * Club domestic league appearances and goals as of 7 November 2026

Arttu Auranen (born 2 September 1999) is a Finnish footballer who plays as a central midfielder for HIFK.

== Career ==
Auranen debuted in Veikkausliiga with FC Lahti first team in 2020. On 15 October 2020, he scored his first goal in the league, in a match against Rovaniemen Palloseura (RoPS).

After spending two years with PK-35, Auranen was without club during the 2023 season due to a long-lasted injury. On 7 March 2024, he signed with Ykkösliiga club Käpylän Pallo (KäPa).
