= Holger Salin =

Finnish footballer (1911–1943)

Personal information
- Date of birth: 18 September 1911
- Place of birth: Finland
- Date of death: c. 1943
- Position: Striker

Senior career*
Years	Team	Apps	(Gls)
1929–1943	HIFK	128	(101)

International career
1931–1943	Finland	22	(4)
- * Club domestic league appearances and goals

Holger Salin (18 September 1911 – c. 1943) was a Finnish footballer who played at both professional and international levels as a striker.

== Career ==
Salin was born in Finland and played football with HIFK. Salin was the first-ever top goalscorer in the Mestaruussarja, scoring 9 goals, tied with Olof Strömsten of KIF Helsinki in 1930 and was the sole top goalscorer in 1931 with 11 goals. In total he scored 101 goals for HIFK in premier division and two in 1929 cup competition. Salin earned 22 caps for the Finland national team between 1931 and 1943, scoring 4 goals in the process. He also appeared in one FIFA World Cup qualifying match in August 1937. Salin died unexpectedly at the age of 32.

== Honours ==
=== Club ===
HIFK Helsinki

- Mestaruussarja: 1930, 1931

=== Individual ===
- Mestaruussarja top scorer: 1930 (tied), 1931
