= Abraham Tokazier =

Finnish sprinter

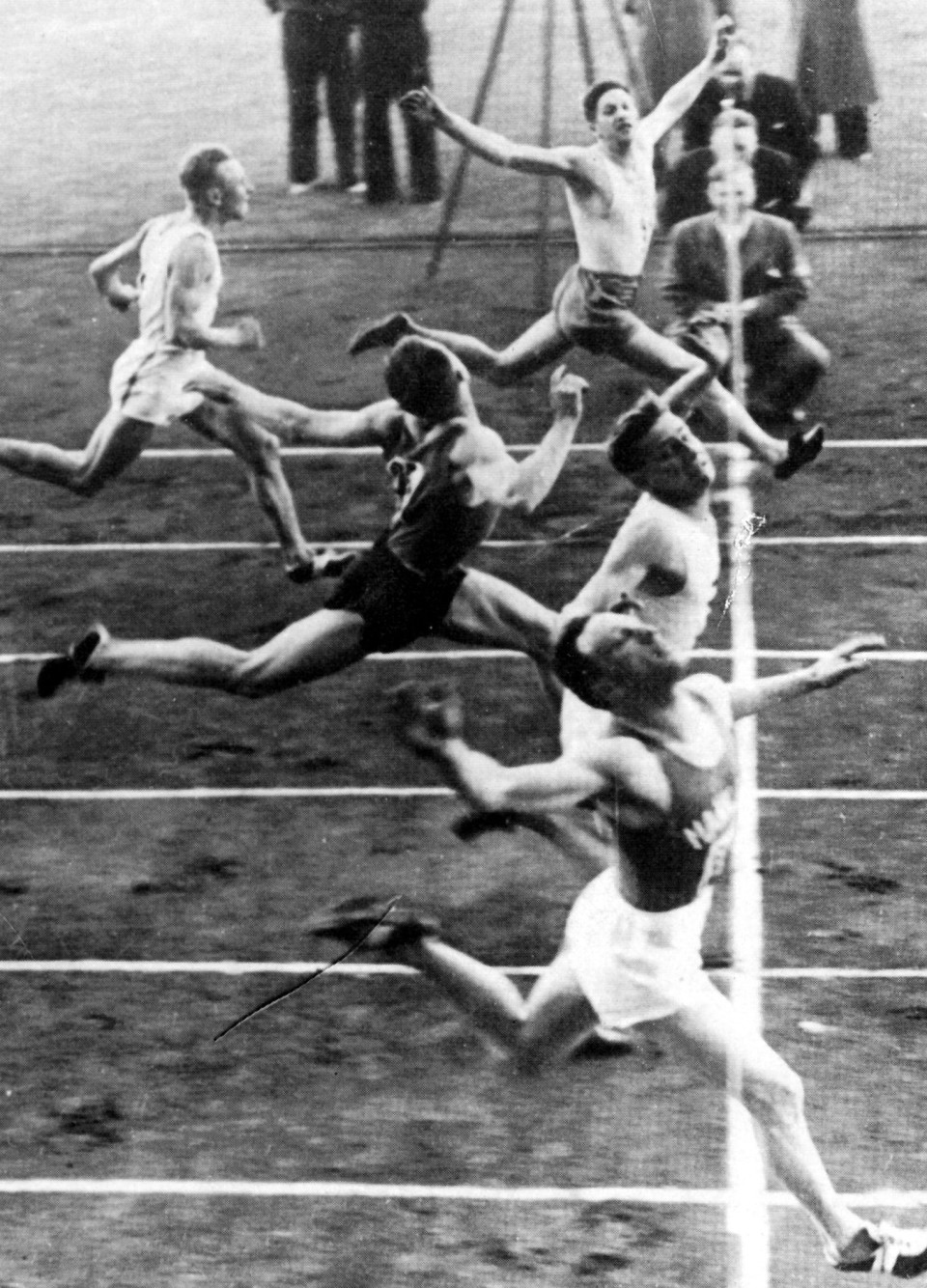
Finish line shot of the 1938 race. Abraham Tokazier in front.

Abraham Tokazier (born 29 September 1909 in Helsinki, died 7 April 1976 in Stockholm) was a Finnish sprinter of Jewish descent. His best achievement was second place in the 100 metres run at the 1938 Finnish Championships. He is best remembered for winning the 100 metres at the Helsinki Olympic Stadium's opening games, but being demoted to fourth place by the jury. Tokazier's club was Makkabi Helsinki.

== The 1938 scandal race ==
On 21 June 1938 Tokazier competed in the 100 metres at the Helsinki Olympic Stadium's opening games. He crossed the finish line first but the official results placed Tokazier fourth, even though the announcer declared him as the winner right after the race. On the next day a picture taken at the finish line was published in the Helsingin Sanomat newspaper. The picture clearly proves that Tokazier (in dark vest nearest the camera) was the first one to cross the line. The reason for demoting Tokazier to fourth place was most likely antisemitism rather than a mistake made by the jury. An official delegation from Nazi Germany was among the guests and that was the reason why organizers dropped him out of the podium.

The scandal became popular again in 2013 as the Finnish author Kjell Westö wrote about it on his book Hägring 38. Finally on 18 September 2013 the Finnish Amateur Athletic Association made an apology to the family of Tokazier and admitted that he was the real winner of the 1938 race. The official results cannot be overruled due to the rules of International Association of Athletics Federations.
