= ViPS Viipuri =

Bandy club

Location of Viipuri within the 1812–1940 Finnish borders

Viipurin Palloseura (abbreviated as ViPS; 'Viipuri Ball Club') was mainly a bandy club from Viipuri, Finland, founded in 1928. The sport came to Finland from St. Petersburg, Russia, and it was natural that it gained a strong foothold in near-by Viipuri.

During the Winter War (1939–40), the population of Viipuri was evacuated, and in the 1940 Moscow Peace Treaty the city was ceded to the Soviet Union. As a result of this, the club was in effect dissolved. A new bandy club called Hukat was formed in Helsinki, its players consisting mostly of former ViPS players.

== Sporting achievements ==
ViPS won the Finnish championship in bandy in 1931 and 1936, silver in 1934, and bronze in 1932 and 1933.

In association football ViPS played for two seasons, in 1930–31, in the Mestaruussarja, i.e. 'Championship Series', the top flight of Finnish football.

In ice hockey the club made it to the semifinals in the season 1928–29.

ViPS in the Bandy Finnish Championship Series

Season	G	W	D	L	GF	GA	P	Rank
1931	5	5	0	0	27	11	10	1
1932	5	3	1	1	18	19	7	3
1933	5	3	0	2	8	7	6	3
1934	5	3	1	1	15	7	7	2
1935	5	1	2	2	11	13	4	5
1936	7	6	0	1	24	10	12	1
1937	3	1	1	1	8	7	3	3rd in section
1938	5	2	2	1	7	6	6	3rd in section
1939	5	3	1	1	14	10	7	3rd in section
Total	45	27	8	10	132	90	62	22.(2010)

=== Season to season in football ===
Season	Level	Division	Section	Administration	Position	Movements
1930	Tier 1	A-Sarja (Premier League)		Finnish FA (Suomen Palloliitto)	4th	
1931	Tier 1	A-Sarja (Premier League)		Finnish FA (Suomen Palloliitto)	8th	Relegated
1932	Tier 2	B-Sarja (Second Division)		Finnish FA (Suomen Palloliitto)	5th	
1933	Tier 3	Piirinsarja (District League)		Viipuri (SPL Viipuri)		
1934	Tier 2	B-Sarja (Second Division)	East Group	Finnish FA (Suomen Palloliitto)	1st	Promotion Group 3rd
1935	Tier 2	B-Sarja (Second Division)	East Group	Finnish FA (Suomen Palloliitto)	1st	Promotion Group 3rd
1936	Tier 2	Itä-Länsi-Sarja (Second Division)	East League	Finnish FA (Suomen Palloliitto)	3rd	
1937	Tier 2	Itä-Länsi-Sarja (Second Division)	East League	Finnish FA (Suomen Palloliitto)	4th	
1938	Tier 2	Itä-Länsi-Sarja (Second Division)	East League, South Group	Finnish FA (Suomen Palloliitto)	3rd	
1939	Tier 2	Itä-Länsi-Sarja (Second Division)	East League, South Group	Finnish FA (Suomen Palloliitto)	6th	
1940						Dissolved

- 2 seasons in A-Sarja
- 7 seasons in B-Sarja
- 1 seasons in Piirinsarja
