= Mika Laurikainen =

Finnish football manager (born 1963)

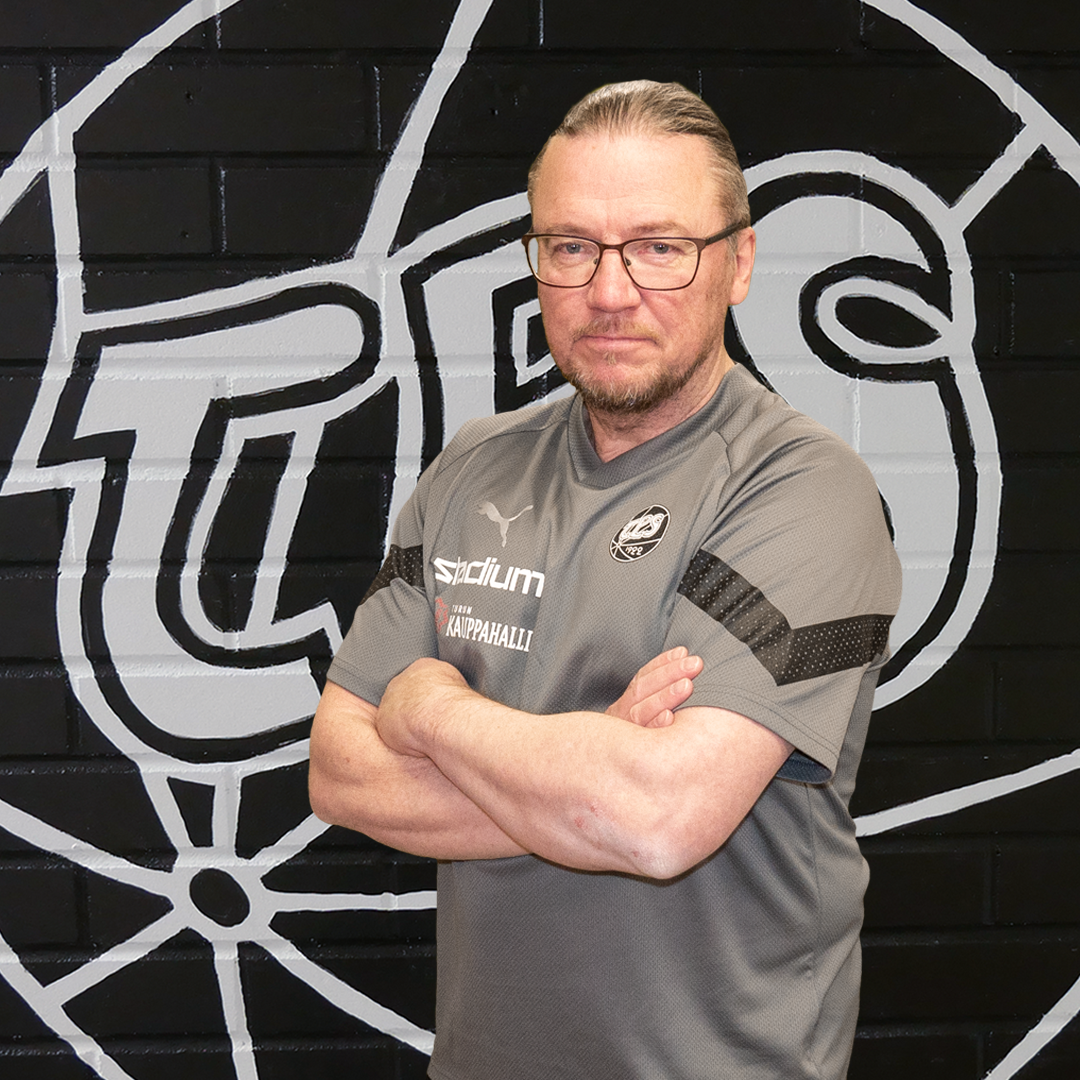
- Laurikainen in 2022

Personal information
- Date of birth: 28 April 1963 (age 63)
- Place of birth: Turku, Finland

Team information
- Current team: Paide Linnameeskond (academy director)

Managerial career
- Years: Team
- 1996–2000: ÅIFK
- 2001–2003: TPS
- 2006: MyPa (assistant)
- 2007–2009: FF Jaro
- 2009–2010: Finland U18
- 2009–2010: Finland U19
- 2011–2013: Finland U21
- 2014–2018: TPS
- 2020–2022: TPS (sporting director)
- 2023: TPS
- 2024–: Paide (academy director)

Mika Laurikainen (born 28 April 1963) is a Finnish football manager who works as an academy director in Paide Linnameeskond.

== Career ==
On 16 December 2022, while serving as the club's sporting director, Laurikainen appointed himself the head coach of Turun Palloseura (TPS) for the 2023 season. After the season, it was announced that Laurikainen will leave out from the club.

On 30 August 2024, it was reported that Laurikainen would start as an academy director of Estonian Meistriliiga club Paide Linnameeskond.

== Personal life ==
His son Joonas is a former footballer and a current coach.

== Honours ==
Individual

- Veikkausliiga Coach of the Month: June 2009
