= 1933 Mestaruussarja – Finnish League Championship =

Mestaruussarja
- Season: 1933
- Champions: HIFK Helsinki
- Relegated: VPS Vaasa; EIF Tammisaari
- Top goalscorer: Olof Strömsten, HIFK Helsinki (18)

The 1933 season was the fourth completed season of Finnish Football League Championship, known as the Mestaruussarja.

== Overview ==
The 1933 Mestaruussarja was contested by 8 teams, with HIFK Helsinki winning the championship which was also known as the A-sarja. VPS Vaasa and EIF Tammisaari were relegated to the second tier which was known as the B-sarja.

== League table ==
Pos	Team	Pld	W	D	L	GF	GA	GD	Pts
1	HIFK Helsinki (C)	14	13	1	0	67	13	+54	27
2	HJK Helsinki	14	5	6	3	20	14	+6	16
3	Sudet Viipuri	14	5	6	3	22	16	+6	16
4	TPS Turku	14	5	5	4	29	21	+8	15
5	ÅIFK Turku	14	6	2	6	28	32	−4	14
6	HPS Helsinki	14	5	3	6	27	19	+8	13
7	VPS Vaasa (R)	14	5	1	8	34	40	−6	11
8	EIF Tammisaari (R)	14	0	0	14	11	83	−72	0

(C) Champions; (R) Relegated

== Results ==
Home \ Away	EIF	HFK	HJK	HPS	SUD	TPS	VPS	ÅIF
EIF		1–4	0–5	1–3	2–4	0–5	1–8	1–5
HIFK	10–3		3–0	4–2	3–0	3–3	7–0	3–1
HJK	6–0	0–3		0–0	0–0	2–2	4–1	0–0
HPS	6–0	0–6	0–0		0–0	2–1	1–0	11–0
Sudet	4–0	0–3	0–0	3–2		1–1	3–0	0–0
TPS	7–0	0–5	0–1	1–0	1–1		3–2	3–1
VPS	9–1	1–8	5–0	1–0	4–3	1–1		1–2
ÅIFK	7–1	2–5	0–2	2–0	0–3	2–1	6–1	

Legend: Blue = home team win; Yellow = draw; Red = away team win.
