= 1930 Mestaruussarja – Finnish League Championship =

Mestaruussarja
- Season: 1930
- Champions: HIFK Helsinki (1st title)
- Relegated: Stjärnan Helsinki; ÅIFK Turku
- Matches: 56
- Goals: 151 (2.7 per match)
- Top goalscorer: Holger Salin, HIFK Helsinki; Olof Strömsten, KIF Helsinki (9)

The 1930 Mestaruussarja season was the first completed season of Finnish Football Championship played in a league format, known locally as the Mestaruussarja, ‘Championship Series’. Prior to this, from 1908 to 1929, the championship had been decided in a cup competition, which was NOT called the Finnish Cup.

== Overview ==
The 1930 Mestaruussarja was contested by 8 teams, with HIFK Helsinki claiming the inaugural championship, which was also known as the A-sarja, by winning a tiebreaker match with the scoreline of 4–1 over TPS Turku. Stjärnan Helsinki and ÅIFK Turku were relegated to the second tier, which was known as the B-sarja.

== Participating clubs ==
Location of teams in 1930 Mestaruussarja

In 1930, there were 8 participants in the Mestaruussarja:

- ÅIFK Turku
- HIFK Helsinki
- HPS Helsinki
- KIF Helsinki
- Stjärnan Helsinki
- TPS Turku
- ViPS Viipuri
- VPS Vaasa

== League table ==
Pos	Team	Pld	W	D	L	GF	GA	GD	Pts	Qualification or relegation
1	HIFK Helsinki(O) (C)	7	5	2	0	22	7	+15	12	Finnish Champions
2	TPS Turku (O)	7	5	2	0	25	12	+13	12 (Note: Because of the tie between two top teams, a replay match was played between HIFK Helsinki and TPS Turku. HIFK Helsinki won the match 4–1.)	Participated in championship replay
3	HPS Helsinki	7	4	1	2	26	17	+9	9	
4	ViPS Viipuri	7	3	1	3	20	16	+4	7	
5	VPS Vaasa	7	2	3	2	23	27	−4	7	
6	KIF Helsinki	7	2	2	3	17	18	−1	6	
7	Stjärnan Helsinki (R)	7	0	2	5	9	35	−26	2	Relegated to Suomensarja
8	ÅIFK Turku (R)	7	0	1	6	9	19	−10	1	Relegated to Suomensarja

Source: rsssf.com
(O) Play-off winners; (R) Relegated

== Results ==
Home \ Away	HFK	HPS	KIF	STJ	TPS	VVI	VPS	ÅIF
HIFK			4–0	8–1	1–1			
HPS	1–3		3–2	5–2				2–1
KIF				4–0	3–3		4–4	
Stjärnan						0–5		1–1
TPS		3–2		9–2			3–2	1–0
ViPS	1–2	4–4	1–0		2–5			
VPS	2–2	2–9		3–3		5–3		5–3
ÅIFK	1–2		3–4			0–4		

Legend: Blue = home team win; Yellow = draw; Red = away team win.

== Members of the HIFK champions’ team ==
- Charles Holmberg; Frans Karjagin, Gösta Lesch; Alfons Nylund, Torsten Lindholm, Axel Lindbäck; Gunnar Åström, Jarl Malmgren, Torsten Svanström, Holger Salin, Ragnar Lindbäck.
