= Turun Palloseura =

Finnish football club

- Full name: Turun Palloseura
- Founded: 1922; 104 years ago
- Ground: Veritas Stadion
- Capacity: 8,072
- Chairman: Jouko Peräaho
- Manager: Ivan Piñol
- League: Veikkausliiga
- 2026: Veikkausliiga, 9th of 12
- Website: www.fc.tps.fi
Home colours	Away colours

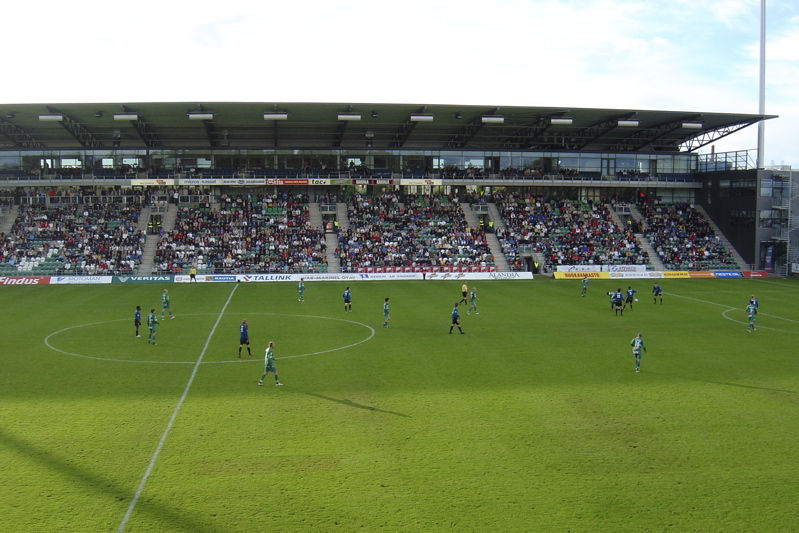
Veritas Stadion, club's home ground.

Turun Palloseura, commonly known as TPS, is a professional football club based in Turku, Finland. Since winning promotion in 2025, the men's team competes in Veikkausliiga, the highest tier. Nicknamed "Tepsi", the club was founded in 1922.

TPS have won eight League titles and three Finnish Cups. They play their home league matches at Veritas Stadion, with a capacity of 9,372 seats for most matches.

== History ==
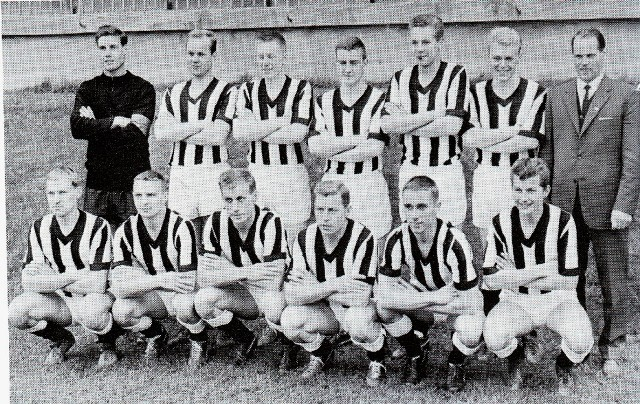
TPS squad in 1965

In the early stages of the UEFA Cup of the season 1987–88, TPS beat Internazionale at the San Siro stadium in Milan, thanks to a goal by Mika Aaltonen, who was later signed by Inter. They lost the return leg with 0–2, but this is widely regarded as the highest point by the club in international football.

After season 2000, TPS lost its place in Finland's Premier League and played for two seasons in the Ykkönen (eng first) in the Finnish first division. In 2001, Petri Jakonen was named a new sporting director of TPS. They aimed to get back up to the Premier League with determination and it took them two seasons to complete the mission. Since season 2003 TPS has again played in the Finland's Premier League, Veikkausliiga. TPS managed to get in the final of the Finnish Cup in 2005, but lost to Haka 4–1 at Finnair Stadium.

Before season 2007, TPS hired famous Finnish striker Mixu Paatelainen as their manager. In his guidance TPS won bronze, ending their ten-year medalless run. After the end of season Paatelainen left for Scottish club Hibernian FC in early January 2008. Quickly TPS hired heralded Finnish manager Martti Kuusela. However Kuusela didn't get the best out of his squad and was fired mid September 2008. Overall TPS ended sixth in Veikkausliiga. So again, TPS had to get a new manager, their third in as many seasons. This time they picked Pasi Rautiainen. The CEO also changed next year as Jakonen moved on to Finnish FA and a former sporting director Marco Casagrande was named the new CEO.

In recent years, TPS has had the highest average attendance in Veikkausliiga but it has suffered from a poor rental agreement with Veritas Stadion. This has led TPS for planning to build their own stadium in Nummi. They also considered the possibility of using the Paavo Nurmi Stadion as their home ground, but these plans faced scheduling problems with Athletics competitions and were scrapped. Both Turku based teams however played few games at the Paavo Nurmi Stadion during 2014 season when the Veritas Stadion was under maintenance. After relegation TPS changed their home venue to the Urheilupuiston yläkenttä, which is close to the Paavo Nurmi Stadion in the Turku Sports Park, but is not eligible to be used in the Veikkausliiga. Future plans for home ground development have not been made public.

TPS returned to the Veikkausliiga for the 2018 season, winning the Ykkönen title on 21 October 2017 with a 1–1 draw against Honka. However, after the 2018 season, TPS was again relegated to Ykkönen, after finishing second-to-last in the league and losing the two-leg play-off against Kokkolan Pallo-Veikot (KPV), the Ykkönen runner-up. Since the 2018 season, TPS plays all home games at Veritas Stadion.

During 2020–2022, the club's former manager Mika Laurikainen worked as a sporting director. He named himself the first team's head coach for the 2023 Ykkönen season.

The club's former homegrown player Lukas Hradecky had been a minority shareholder of the club. In mid-August 2024, it was announced that Hradecky had increased his share and is currently one of the club's majority owners. In late August, the club's former player Kasper Hämäläinen was named the new sporting director.

Due to economic troubles, head coach Miika Nuutinen left the club in January 2025 after serving one season in the position. Subsequently a Spanish coach Ivan Piñol was named the new manager for the 2025 Ykkösliiga season.

== Honours ==
TPS honours
Competition	Titles / medals	Seasons
Finnish Championship	8	1928, (Note: The championship was decided via cup competition.) 1939, 1941, 1949, 1968, 1971, 1972, 1975
Finnish Championship	12	1923, 1925, 1926, 1930, 1938, 1944, 1946, 1948, 1960, 1984, 1986, 1989
Finnish Championship	11	1929, 1931, 1957, 1967, 1977, 1987, 1996, 2007, 2009, 2010, 2012
Finnish Cup	3	1991, 1994, 2010
Finnish League Cup	1	2012

== Season to season ==
Season to Season

Season	Level	Division	Section	Administration	Position	Movements
1930	Tier 1	A-Sarja (Premier League)		Finnish FA (Suomen Palloliitto)	2nd	Championship rematch, lost to HIFK
1931	Tier 1	A-Sarja (Premier League)		Finnish FA (Suomen Palloliitto)	3rd	
1932	Tier 1	A-Sarja (Premier League)		Finnish FA (Suomen Palloliitto)	4th	
1933	Tier 1	A-Sarja (Premier League)		Finnish FA (Suomen Palloliitto)	4th	
1934	Tier 1	A-Sarja (Premier League)		Finnish FA (Suomen Palloliitto)	7th	Relegated
1935	Tier 2	B-Sarja (Second Division)	West Group	Finnish FA (Suomen Palloliitto)	1st	Promotion Group 1st
1936	Tier 1	Mestaruussarja (Premier League)		Finnish FA (Suomen Palloliitto)	6th	
1937	Tier 1	Mestaruussarja (Premier League)		Finnish FA (Suomen Palloliitto)	6th	
1938	Tier 1	Mestaruussarja (Premier League)		Finnish FA (Suomen Palloliitto)	2nd	
1939	Tier 1	Mestaruussarja (Premier League)		Finnish FA (Suomen Palloliitto)	1st	Champions
1940	Tier 1	Cup-Competition	Cup format	Finnish FA(Suomen Palloliitto)	Final	Lost to Sudet
1940–1941	Tier 1	Mestaruussarja (Premier League)		Finnish FA (Suomen Palloliitto)	1st	Champions
1942	Tier 1	Cup-Competition	Cup format	Finnish FA & TUL(Suomen Palloliitto & Työväen Urheiluliitto)	Quarterfinals	
1943–44	Tier 1	Mestaruussarja (Premier League)		Finnish FA (Suomen Palloliitto)	2nd	Championship rematch, lost to VIFK
1945	Tier 1	SPL Mestaruussarja (Premier League)	Group A	Finnish FA (Suomen Palloliitto)	1st	Championship Playoff SPL Champions
1945	Tier 1	Cup-Competition	Cup format	Finnish FA & TUL(Suomen Palloliitto & Työväen Urheiluliitto)	Semifinals	
1945–46	Tier 1	Mestaruussarja (Premier League)		Finnish FA (Suomen Palloliitto)	2nd	
1946–47	Tier 1	Mestaruussarja (Premier League)		Finnish FA (Suomen Palloliitto)	4th	
1947–48	Tier 1	Mestaruussarja (Premier League)		Finnish FA (Suomen Palloliitto)	4th	
1948	Tier 1	Mestaruussarja (Premier League)		Finnish FA (Suomen Palloliitto)	2nd	
1949	Tier 1	Mestaruussarja (Premier League)		Finnish FA (Suomen Palloliitto)	1st	Champions
1950	Tier 1	Mestaruussarja (Premier League)		Finnish FA (Suomen Palloliitto)	7th	
1951	Tier 1	Mestaruussarja (Premier League)		Finnish FA (Suomen Palloliitto)	6th	
1952	Tier 1	Mestaruussarja (Premier League)		Finnish FA (Suomen Palloliitto)	10th	Relegated
1953	Tier 2	Suomensarja (Second Division)	West Group	Finnish FA (Suomen Palloliitto)	4th	
1954	Tier 2	Suomensarja (Second Division)	West Group	Finnish FA (Suomen Palloliitto)	5th	
1955	Tier 2	Suomensarja (Second Division)	West Group	Finnish FA (Suomen Palloliitto)	5th	
1956	Tier 2	Suomensarja (Second Division)	West Group	Finnish FA (Suomen Palloliitto)	1st	Promoted
1957	Tier 1	Mestaruussarja (Premier League)		Finnish FA (Suomen Palloliitto)	3rd	
1958	Tier 1	Mestaruussarja (Premier League)		Finnish FA (Suomen Palloliitto)	4th	
1959	Tier 1	Mestaruussarja (Premier League)		Finnish FA (Suomen Palloliitto)	6th	
1960	Tier 1	Mestaruussarja (Premier League)		Finnish FA (Suomen Palloliitto)	2nd	
1961	Tier 1	Mestaruussarja (Premier League)		Finnish FA (Suomen Palloliitto)	4th	
1962	Tier 1	Mestaruussarja (Premier League)		Finnish FA (Suomen Palloliitto)	8th	
1963	Tier 1	Mestaruussarja (Premier League)		Finnish FA (Suomen Palloliitto)	10th	Relegated
1964	Tier 2	Suomensarja (Second Division)	West Group	Finnish FA (Suomen Palloliitto)	2nd	
1965	Tier 2	Suomensarja (Second Division)	West Group	Finnish FA (Suomen Palloliitto)	1st	Promotion Playoff – Promoted
1966	Tier 1	Mestaruussarja (Premier League)		Finnish FA (Suomen Palloliitto)	7th	
1967	Tier 1	Mestaruussarja (Premier League)		Finnish FA (Suomen Palloliitto)	3rd	
1968	Tier 1	Mestaruussarja (Premier League)		Finnish FA (Suomen Palloliitto)	1st	Champions
1969	Tier 1	Mestaruussarja (Premier League)		Finnish FA (Suomen Palloliitto)	8th	
1970	Tier 1	Mestaruussarja (Premier League)		Finnish FA (Suomen Palloliitto)	7th	
1971	Tier 1	Mestaruussarja (Premier League)		Finnish FA (Suomen Palloliitto)	1st	Champions
1972	Tier 1	Mestaruussarja (Premier League)		Finnish FA (Suomen Palloliitto)	1st	Champions
1973	Tier 1	Mestaruussarja (Premier League)		Finnish FA (Suomen Palloliitto)	9th	
1974	Tier 1	Mestaruussarja (Premier League)		Finnish FA (Suomen Palloliitto)	6th	
1975	Tier 1	Mestaruussarja (Premier League)		Finnish FA (Suomen Palloliitto)	1st	Champions
1976	Tier 1	Mestaruussarja (Premier League)		Finnish FA (Suomen Palloliitto)	10th	
1977	Tier 1	Mestaruussarja (Premier League)		Finnish FA (Suomen Palloliitto)	3rd	
1978	Tier 1	Mestaruussarja (Premier League)		Finnish FA (Suomen Palloliitto)	4th	
1979	Tier 1	Mestaruussarja (Premier League)		Finnish FA (Suomen Palloliitto)	6th	Championship Group 7th
1980	Tier 1	SM-Sarja (Premier League)		Finnish FA (Suomen Palloliitto)	2nd	Championship Group 4th
1981	Tier 1	SM-Sarja (Premier League)		Finnish FA (Suomen Palloliitto)	3rd	Championship Group 4th
1982	Tier 1	SM-Sarja (Premier League)		Finnish FA (Suomen Palloliitto)	1st	Championship Group 4th
1983	Tier 1	SM-Sarja (Premier League)		Finnish FA (Suomen Palloliitto)	1st	Championship Group 4th
1984	Tier 1	SM-Sarja (Premier League)		Finnish FA (Suomen Palloliitto)	2nd	Championship Playoff 2nd
1985	Tier 1	SM-Sarja (Premier League)		Finnish FA (Suomen Palloliitto)	1st	Championship Playoff 4th
1986	Tier 1	SM-Sarja (Premier League)		Finnish FA (Suomen Palloliitto)	2nd	
1987	Tier 1	SM-Sarja (Premier League)		Finnish FA (Suomen Palloliitto)	3rd	
1988	Tier 1	SM-Sarja (Premier League)		Finnish FA (Suomen Palloliitto)	5th	Championship Group 5th
1989	Tier 1	SM-Sarja (Premier League)		Finnish FA (Suomen Palloliitto)	2nd	Championship Group 2nd
1990	Tier 1	Veikkausliiga (Premier League)		Finnish FA (Suomen Palloliitto)	6th	Championship Playoff Quarterfinals
1991	Tier 1	Veikkausliiga (Premier League)		Finnish FA (Suomen Palloliitto)	9th	
1992	Tier 1	Veikkausliiga (Premier League)		Finnish FA (Suomen Palloliitto)	9th	
1993	Tier 1	Veikkausliiga (Premier League)		Finnish FA (Suomen Palloliitto)	7th	Championship Group 8th
1994	Tier 1	Veikkausliiga (Premier League)		Finnish FA (Suomen Palloliitto)	8th	
1995	Tier 1	Veikkausliiga (Premier League)		Finnish FA (Suomen Palloliitto)	6th	
1996	Tier 1	Veikkausliiga (Premier League)		Finnish FA (Suomen Palloliitto)	3rd	Upper Group – 3rd
1997	Tier 1	Veikkausliiga (Premier League)		Finnish FA (Suomen Palloliitto)	6th	Third round – 4th
1998	Tier 1	Veikkausliiga (Premier League)		Finnish FA (Suomen Palloliitto)	5th	Third round – 6th
1999	Tier 1	Veikkausliiga (Premier League)		Finnish FA (Suomen Palloliitto)	9th	Lower Group – 9th
2000	Tier 1	Veikkausliiga (Premier League)		Finnish FA (Suomen Palloliitto)	11th	Playoff – Relegated
2001	Tier 2	Ykkönen (First Division)	South Group	Finnish FA (Suomen Palloliitto)	1st	Playoffs
2002	Tier 2	Ykkönen (First Division)	North Group	Finnish FA (Suomen Palloliitto)	1st	promotion/relegation group 2nd – Promoted
2003	Tier 1	Veikkausliiga (Premier League)		Finnish FA (Suomen Palloliitto)	9th	
2004	Tier 1	Veikkausliiga (Premier League)		Finnish FA (Suomen Palloliitto)	5th	
2005	Tier 1	Veikkausliiga (Premier League)		Finnish FA (Suomen Palloliitto)	9th	
2006	Tier 1	Veikkausliiga (Premier League)		Finnish FA (Suomen Palloliitto)	7th	
2007	Tier 1	Veikkausliiga (Premier League)		Finnish FA (Suomen Palloliitto)	3rd	
2008	Tier 1	Veikkausliiga (Premier League)		Finnish FA (Suomen Palloliitto)	6th	
2009	Tier 1	Veikkausliiga (Premier League)		Finnish FA (Suomen Palloliitto)	3rd	
2010	Tier 1	Veikkausliiga (Premier League)		Finnish FA (Suomen Palloliitto)	3rd	
2011	Tier 1	Veikkausliiga (Premier League)		Finnish FA (Suomen Palloliitto)	5th	
2012	Tier 1	Veikkausliiga (Premier League)		Finnish FA (Suomen Palloliitto)	3rd	
2013	Tier 1	Veikkausliiga (Premier League)		Finnish FA (Suomen Palloliitto)	8th	
2014	Tier 1	Veikkausliiga (Premier League)		Finnish FA (Suomen Palloliitto)	12th	Relegated to Ykkönen
2015	Tier 2	Ykkönen (First Division)		Finnish FA (Suomen Palloliitto)	3rd	
2016	Tier 2	Ykkönen (First Division)		Finnish FA (Suomen Palloliitto)	2nd	Playoffs
2017	Tier 2	Ykkönen (First Division)		Finnish FA (Suomen Palloliitto)	1st	Promoted to Veikkausliiga
2018	Tier 1	Veikkausliiga (Premier League)		Finnish FA (Suomen Palloliitto)	11th	Relegation Playoff – Relegated
2019	Tier 2	Ykkönen (First Division)		Finnish FA (Suomen Palloliitto)	2nd	Promotion Playoff – Promoted
2020	Tier 1	Veikkausliiga (Premier League)		Finnish FA (Suomen Palloliitto)	11th	Relegation Playoff – Relegated
2021	Tier 2	Ykkönen (First Division)		Finnish FA (Suomen Palloliitto)	3rd	
2022	Tier 2	Ykkönen (First Division)		Finnish FA (Suomen Palloliitto)	2nd	
2023	Tier 2	Ykkönen (First Division)		Finnish FA (Suomen Palloliitto)	5th	
2024	Tier 2	Ykkösliiga (First Division)		Finnish FA (Suomen Palloliitto)	4th	
2025	Tier 2	Ykkösliiga (First Division)		Finnish FA (Suomen Palloliitto)		

- 76 seasons in Veikkausliiga
- 17 seasons in Ykkönen/Ykkösliiga
- 3 seasons in Cup-format championship

== Transfers ==
Previously, Turun Palloseura have produced numerous local players for Veikkausliiga and for transfers abroad.

=== Record transfers ===
Rank	Player	To	Fee	Year
1.	(Finland) Roope Riski	(Italy) Cesena	€750,000	2011
2.	(Finland) Jere Uronen	(Sweden) Helsingborg	€750,000	2012
3.	(Finland) Peter Enckelman	(England) Aston Villa	€570,000	1999
4.	(Finland) Toni Kolehmainen	(Norway) Hønefoss	€500,000	2012
5.	(Finland) Jani Virtanen	(Italy) Udinese	€350,000	2006
6.	(Finland) Riku Riski	(Poland) Widzew Łódź	€300,000	2011
6.	(Finland) Kasper Hämäläinen	(Sweden) Djurgården	€300,000	2010
6.	(Finland) Mika Aaltonen	(Italy) Inter Milan	€300,000	1987

== Current squad ==
As of 27 July, 2026

Note: Flags indicate national team as defined under FIFA eligibility rules; some limited exceptions apply. Players may hold more than one non-FIFA nationality.

No.	Pos.	Nation	Player
1	GK	FIN	Elmo Henriksson
2	DF	FIN	Oscar Häggström
3	DF	FIN	Eetu Turkki (on loan from Ilves)
6	MF	ESP	Pau Juvanteny
7	FW	FIN	Rasmus Harjanne
9	FW	AUS	Luke Ivanovic
10	MF	FIN	Marius Könkkölä
11	FW	FIN	Elmer Vauhkonen
14	MF	FIN	Matej Hradecky
15	DF	BEN	Charlemagne Azongnitode
17	DF	FIN	Atte Sihvonen
20	FW	FIN	Miika Kauppila

No.	Pos.	Nation	Player
22	MF	NED	Timo Zaal
24	DF	FIN	Nikolas Talo
25	DF	GAM	Abdoulie Tamba (on loan from Norrköping)
26	MF	FIN	Lasse Ikonen
28	MF	FIN	Tomi Väkiparta
29	FW	KOS	Albijon Muzaci
35	GK	FIN	Dan Lauri
41	FW	FIN	Samuel Anini Junior
44	FW	LAT	Nils Veinbergs (on loan from Ilves)
77	DF	FIN	Tobias Karkulowski
99	FW	NED	Kian Visser

=== Out on loan ===
Note: Flags indicate national team as defined under FIFA eligibility rules; some limited exceptions apply. Players may hold more than one non-FIFA nationality.

No.	Pos.	Nation	Player
5	DF	FIN	Jesper Aitos (at Åbo IFK until 31 December 2026)
18	FW	FIN	Nino Rajamäki (at Pallo-Iirot until 31 December 2026)

No.	Pos.	Nation	Player
30	GK	FIN	Niklas Harju (at Pargas IF until 31 December 2026)

== Management and boardroom ==
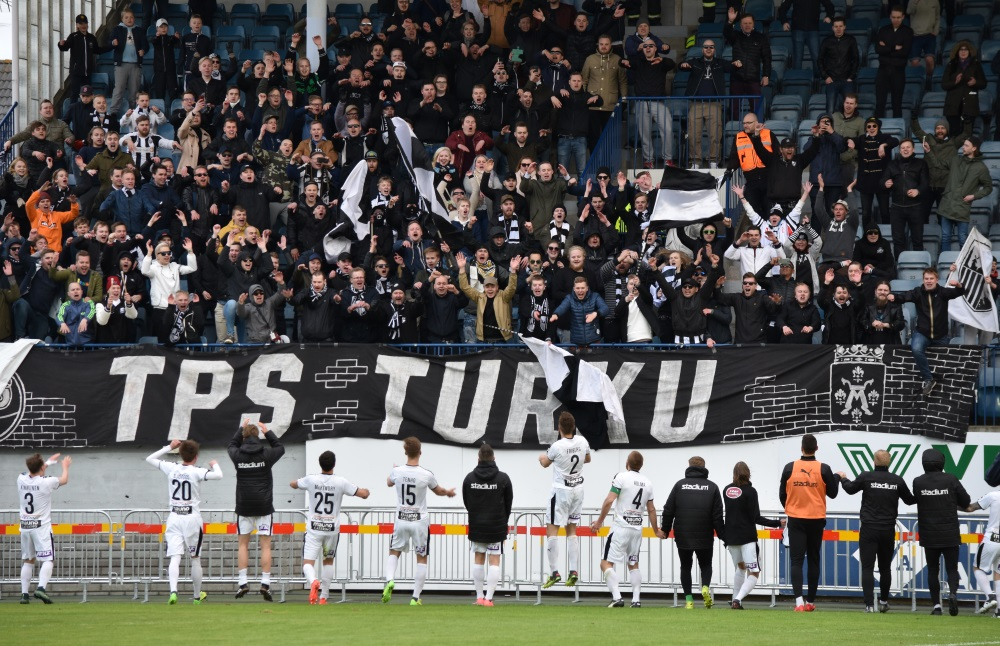
Football fans of Turun Palloseura

=== Management ===
As of 26 January 2025

Name	Role
(Spain) Ivan Piñol	Head coach
(Finland) Henri Jussila	Coach
(Finland) Jarkko Ojaniemi	Goalkeeping coach
(Finland) Michael Oliphant	Fitness coach
(Finland) Kalle Tallqvist	Talent coach
(Finland) Jani Tuomala	Team manager
(Finland) Tapani Elmeranta	Kit manager
(Finland) Jyrki Rauhaniemi	Doctor

=== Boardroom ===
As of 29 August 2024

Name	Role
(Finland) Jouko Peräaho	Chairman
(Finland) Rasmus Holma	CEO
(Finland) Kasper Hämäläinen	Sporting director

== Managers ==
- (Finland) Juuso Lampila (1939–47)
- (Hungary) Imre Markos (1948–50)
- (Finland) Raino Suominen (1951–54)
- (Finland) Leo Aaltonen (1955–59)
- (Sweden) Knut Gustafsson (1960–61)
- (Finland) Olli Virho (1962)
- (Finland) Kalevi Lehtovirta (1962)
- (Finland) Leo Aaltonen (1963)
- Tage Friedfeld (1964)
- (Finland) Leo Aaltonen (1964)
- (Finland) Rainer Forss (1965–70)
- (Finland) Paavo Nenonen (1971)
- (Finland) Lars Nyström (1972)
- (Spain) Manuel Gerpe (1973)
- (Finland) Paavo Nenonen (1973–74)
- (Finland) Olavi Laaksonen (1975–77)
- (Finland) Tommy Lindholm (1978)
- (Finland) Tapio Harittu (1978–80)
- (Finland) Raimo Toivanen (1980–83)
- (Finland) Hans Martin (1981–84)
- (Finland) Timo Sinkkonen (1984)
- (Finland) Rainer Forss (1985)
- (Finland) Timo Sinkkonen (1985)
- (Finland) Tommy Lindholm (1986–88)
- (Finland) Heikki Suhonen (1989–90)
- (Finland) Veijo Wahlsten (1989–90)
- (Finland) Heikki Suhonen (1991)
- (Finland) Tommy Lindholm (1991)
- (Finland) Raimo Toivanen (1992–93)
- (Finland) Pauno Kymäläinen (1993)
- (Finland) Tomi Jalo (1993)
- (Finland) Juha Malinen (1993–97)
- (Germany) Siegfried Melzig (1998)
- (Finland) Seppo Miettinen (1998–00)
- (Finland) Mika Laurikainen (2001 – December 2003)
- (Finland) Kari Ukkonen (January 2004 – December 2006)
- (Finland) Mixu Paatelainen (October 2006 – January 2008)
- (Finland) Martti Kuusela (January 2008 – September 2008)
- (Wales) John Allen (September 2008 – December 2008)
- (Finland) Pasi Rautiainen (January 2009 – January 2010)
- (Finland) Marko Rajamäki (January 2010 – February 2014)
- (Finland) Mika Laurikainen (February 2014 – November 2018)
- (Finland) Tommi Pikkarainen (November 2018 – July 2020)
- (Finland) Jonatan Johansson (July 2020 – September 2022)
- (Finland) Marko Rajamäki (October 2022)
- (Finland) Mika Laurikainen (January 2023 – December 2023)
- (Finland) Miika Nuutinen (January 2024 – December 2024)
- (Spain) Ivan Piñol (January 2025 – present)

== TPS in Europe ==
Season	Competition	Round	Country	Club	Score	Agg.
1969–70	European Cup	PR	(Denmark)	KB Copenhagen	0–1, 0–4	0–5
1972–73	European Cup	1R	(East Germany)	1. FC Magdeburg	0–6, 1–3	1–9
1973–74	European Cup	1R	(Scotland)	Celtic FC	1–6, 0–3	1–9
1976–77	European Cup	1R	(Malta)	Sliema Wanderers	1–2, 1–0	2–2
		1/8	(Switzerland)	FC Zürich	0–2, 0–1	0–3
1985–86	UEFA Cup	1R	(Soviet Union)	Spartak Moscow	0–1, 1–3	1–4
1987–88	UEFA Cup	1R	(Austria)	FC Admira/Wacker Wenen	0–1, 2–0	2–1
		2R	(Italy)	Internazionale	1–0, 0–2	1–2
1988–89	UEFA Cup	1R	(Northern Ireland)	Linfield FC Belfast	0–0, 1–1	1–1
		2R	(Austria)	First Vienna	1–2, 1–0	2–2
		1/8	(Romania)	Victoria București	0–1, 3–2	3–3
1990–91	UEFA Cup	1R	(Poland)	GKS Katowice	0–3, 0–1	0–4
1992–93	Cup Winners Cup	1R	(Turkey)	Trabzonspor	0–2, 2–2	2–4
1995–96	Cup Winners Cup	Q	(Albania)	Teuta	1–0, 0–3	1–3
1997	Intertoto Cup	Group	(Sweden)	Halmstads BK	1–6	
		Group	(Belgium)	SK Lommel	1–1	
		Group	(Serbia)	Hajduk Kula	1–2	
		Group	(Norway)	Kongsvinger IL	2–0	
1998	Intertoto Cup	1R	(Switzerland)	FC Sion	0–1, 3–2	2–4
		2R	(Russia)	Shinnik Yaroslavl	0–2, 2–3	2–5
2008	Intertoto Cup	1R	(Northern Ireland)	Lisburn Distillery FC	3–2, 3–1	6–3
		2R	(Denmark)	Odense BK	1–2, 0–2	1–4
2010–11	Europa League	1Q	(Wales)	Port Talbot Town	3–1, 4–0	7–1
		2Q	(Belgium)	Cercle Brugge	1–2, 1–0	2–2
2011–12	Europa League	2Q	(Belgium)	K.V.C. Westerlo	0–1, 0–0	0–1
2013–14	Europa League	1Q	(Luxembourg)	Jeunesse Esch	2–1, 0–2	2–3

== Women's football ==
The club also has a women's team which competes in the Kansallinen Liiga, the top division of women's football in Finland. TPS women took part in the national championship for the first time in 1972, and won the title in 1978. After withdrawing from the top league in 1992, they returned in 2008.
