= 1947 Mestaruussarja =

Mestaruussarja
- Season: 1947

The 1947 season was the 17th completed season of Finnish Football League Championship, which culminated in a play-off group comprising the winners and runners-up of the Palloliiton league and the Työväen Urheiluliiton league. The two top teams finished on equal points and met again in a play-off to determine the winners of the championship.

== Championship play-off ==
Pos	Team	Pld	W	D	L	GF	GA	GD	Pts
1	HIFK Helsinki	3	2	0	1	10	5	+5	6
2	TuTo Turku	3	2	0	1	7	6	+1	6
3	KTP Kotka	3	1	0	2	6	9	−3	3
4	VIFK Vaasa	3	1	0	2	5	8	−3	3

- HIFK Helsinki 2–3 TuTo Turku
- KTP Kotka 4–2 TuTo Turku
- VIFK Vaasa 1–5 HIFK Helsinki
- TuTo Turku 2–0 VIFK Vaasa
- KTP Kotka 1–4 VIFK Vaasa
- HIFK Helsinki 3–1 KTP Kotka

=== Final ===
- HIFK Helsinki 3–2 TuTo Turku
