= 1931 Mestaruussarja – Finnish League Championship =

Mestaruussarja
- Season: 1931
- Champions: HIFK Helsinki
- Relegated: HJK Helsinki; ViPS Viipuri
- Matches: 56
- Goals: 136 (2.43 per match)
- Top goalscorer: Holger Salin, HIFK Helsinki (11)

The 1931 season was the second completed season of Finnish Football League Championship, known as the Mestaruussarja. HIFK Helsinki is the defending champion.

== Overview ==
The 1931 Mestaruussarja was contested by 8 teams, with HIFK Helsinki winning the championship which was also known as the A-sarja [‘A-Series’]. HJK Helsinki and ViPS Viipuri were relegated to the second tier which was known as the B-sarja [‘B-Series’].

== Participating clubs ==
Location of teams in 1931 Mestaruussarja

In 1930, there were 8 participants in the Mestaruussarja:

- HIFK Helsinki
- HJK Helsinki - Promoted from B-sarja
- HPS Helsinki
- KIF Helsinki
- Sudet Viipuri - Promoted from B-sarja
- TPS Turku
- ViPS Viipuri
- VPS Vaasa

== League table ==
Pos	Team	Pld	W	D	L	GF	GA	GD	Pts
1	HIFK Helsinki (C)	7	7	0	0	29	9	+20	14
2	HPS Helsinki	7	4	2	1	22	12	+10	10
3	TPS Turku	7	3	2	2	14	13	+1	8
4	KIF Helsinki	7	3	1	3	16	20	−4	7
5	VPS Vaasa	7	2	3	2	22	19	+3	7
6	Sudet Viipuri	7	1	2	4	14	22	−8	4
7	HJK Helsinki (R)	7	0	3	4	12	16	−4	3
8	ViPS Viipuri (R)	7	0	3	4	7	25	−18	3

(C) Champions; (R) Relegated

== Results ==
Home \ Away	HFK	HJK	HPS	KIF	SUD	TPS	VVI	VPS
HIFK			3–2	3–2			11–0	3–1
HJK	2–3				1–1	0–1		
HPS		3–2			7–2	5–1		
KIF		2–1	2–2				2–1	
Sudet	1–4			4–2			1–1	3–4
TPS	1–2			6–2	3–2			0–0
ViPS		1–1	0–1			2–2		
VPS		5–5	2–2	3–4			7–2	

Legend: Blue = home team win; Yellow = draw; Red = away team win.
