= 2015 Kakkonen =

Kakkonen
- Season: 2015

A total of 40 teams will contest the league divided into four groups, Eteläinen (Southern), Pohjoinen (Northern), Läntinen (Western) and Itäinen (Eastern). 29 returning from the 2014 season, two relegated from Ykkönen and nine promoted from Kolmonen. The champion of each group will qualify to promotion matches to decide which two teams get promoted to the Ykkönen. The bottom three teams in each group and the worst seventh-placed will qualify directly for relegation to Kolmonen. Each team will play a total of 27 matches, playing three times against each team of its group.

FC Viikingit and JIPPO were relegated from the 2014 Ykkönen, while EIF, MP, PS Kemi and VIFK were promoted to the 2015 Ykkönen.

FC Espoo, FC Hämeenlinna, FC Viikkarit, JBK, OLS, PK-37, SC KuFu-98, SOVO and Sporting were relegated from 2014 Kakkonen.

ESC, FC Kiffen, FC Kiisto, FC Santa Claus AC, FCV, KaaPo, MuSa, NJS and Sudet were promoted from the 2014 Kolmonen.

== Stadia and locations ==
Location of the 2014 Kakkonen teams. Eteläinen (Southern) are red dots, Pohjoinen (Northern) are green dots, Läntinen (Western) are blue dots while Itäinen (Eastern) are pink dots.

== League tables ==
=== Eteläinen (Southern) ===
Pos	Team	Pld	W	D	L	GF	GA	GD	Pts	Qualification or relegation
1	FC Honka	27	22	4	1	56	11	+45	70	Qualification to Promotion playoffs
2	Gnistan	27	13	7	7	44	31	+13	46	
3	KäPa	27	11	8	8	45	32	+13	41	
4	TPV	27	11	5	11	42	37	+5	38	
5	JäPS	27	11	5	11	36	41	−5	38	
6	FCV	27	10	6	11	31	36	−5	36	
7	Atlantis FC	27	9	8	10	34	41	−7	35	
8	PK Keski-Uusimaa (R)	27	9	7	11	39	36	+3	34	Relegation to Kolmonen
9	I-Kissat (R)	27	6	7	14	33	38	−5	25	Relegation to Kolmonen
10	NJS (R)	27	2	5	20	23	80	−57	11	Relegation to Kolmonen

Rules for classification: 1) points; 2) goal difference; 3) number of goals scored.
(R) Relegated

=== Pohjoinen (Northern) ===
Pos	Team	Pld	W	D	L	GF	GA	GD	Pts	Qualification or relegation
1	KPV	27	18	4	5	63	35	+28	58	Qualification to Promotion playoffs
2	FC YPA	27	17	3	7	57	30	+27	54	
3	AC Kajaani	27	13	6	8	46	31	+15	45	
4	OPS	27	12	3	12	40	45	−5	39	
5	GBK	27	11	5	11	42	39	+3	38	
6	TP-47	27	11	5	11	31	31	0	38	
7	FC Santa Claus AC	27	12	2	13	43	56	−13	38	
8	JBK (R)	27	9	5	13	38	44	−6	32	Relegation to Kolmonen
9	Kerho 07 (R)	27	9	4	14	40	53	−13	31	Relegation to Kolmonen
10	FC Kiisto (R)	27	2	5	20	22	58	−36	11	Relegation to Kolmonen

Rules for classification: 1) points; 2) goal difference; 3) number of goals scored.
(R) Relegated

=== Läntinen (Western) ===
Pos	Team	Pld	W	D	L	GF	GA	GD	Pts	Qualification or relegation
1	GrIFK	27	20	3	4	78	32	+46	63	Qualification to Promotion playoffs
2	MuSa	27	15	4	8	51	30	+21	49	
3	SalPa	27	11	7	9	35	36	−1	40	
4	ESC	27	11	6	10	31	30	+1	39	
5	BK-46	28	11	7	10	41	46	−5	40	
6	Närpes Kraft	27	10	4	13	52	51	+1	34	
7	Masku (R)	27	10	4	13	28	41	−13	34	Relegation to Kolmonen
8	P-Iirot (R)	27	8	6	13	50	44	+6	30	Relegation to Kolmonen
9	ÅIFK (R)	27	8	6	13	35	56	−21	30	Relegation to Kolmonen
10	KaaPo (R)	27	7	3	17	32	67	−35	24	Relegation to Kolmonen

Rules for classification: 1) points; 2) goal difference; 3) number of goals scored.
(R) Relegated

=== Itäinen (Eastern) ===
Pos	Team	Pld	W	D	L	GF	GA	GD	Pts	Qualification or relegation
1	Klubi 04	24	13	7	4	46	17	+29	46	Qualification to Promotion playoffs
2	Kultsu FC	24	12	8	4	49	34	+15	44	
3	FC Viikingit	24	10	6	8	43	31	+12	36	
4	FC Futura	24	11	3	10	41	40	+1	36	
5	Sudet	24	11	2	11	35	31	+4	35	
6	FC Kiffen	24	9	6	9	24	30	−6	33	
7	FC Lahti Akatemia	24	9	5	10	48	36	+12	32	
8	JIPPO (R)	24	7	8	9	38	34	+4	29	Relegation to Kolmonen
9	FC Myllypuro (R)	24	2	3	19	25	94	−69	9	Relegation to Kolmonen

Rules for classification: 1) points; 2) goal difference; 3) number of goals scored.
(R) Relegated

=== Promotion play-offs ===
Group winners will play two-legged ties. Team pairs will be drawn and the two winning teams will be promoted to the Ykkönen for season 2016.

Group winners
Eteläinen (Southern): FC Honka
Pohjoinen (Northern): KPV
Läntinen (Western): GrIFK
Itäinen (Eastern): Klubi-04

==== First leg ====
10 October 2015

KPV	1 – 0	FC Honka
Mendy 9'

Kokkolan Keskuskenttä, Kokkola
Attendance: 2,125

10 October 2015

GrIFK	5 – 1	Klubi-04
Matrone 30', 41' (pen.); Meyer 43', 45+1'; Britschgi 82'		Lappalainen 12'

Kauniaisten Keskuskenttä, Kauniainen
Attendance: 317

==== Second leg ====
17 October 2015

FC Honka	1 – 1	KPV
Dos Santos 23'		Byskata 9'

Tapiolan Urheilupuisto, Espoo
Attendance: 2,074

KPV won 2–1 on aggregate.

17 October 2015

Klubi-04	0 – 3	GrIFK
		Meyer 29'; D. Langhoff 40'; Matrone 84'

Sonera Stadium, Helsinki
Attendance: 248

GrIFK won 8–1 on aggregate.

=== Eight-placed teams ===
At the end of the season, a comparison is made between the seventh-placed teams. The worst seventh-placed team will be directly relegated to the Kolmonen. The worst seventh-placed team will be determined by point average, because of an uneven number of teams in groups.

Pos	Grp	Team	Pld	W	D	L	GF	GA	GD	Pts	Relegation
1	Northern	FC Santa Claus AC	27	12	2	13	43	56	−13	38	
2	Eastern	FC Lahti Akatemia	24	9	5	10	48	36	+12	32	
3	Southern	Atlantis FC	27	9	8	10	34	41	−7	35	
4	Western	Masku	27	10	4	13	28	41	−13	34	Relegation to Kolmonen

Rules for classification: 1) points; 2) goal difference; 3) number of goals scored.
