= List of people from Volgograd =

Coat of Arms of Volgograd

This is a list of notable people who were born or have lived in Volgograd (1589–1925: Tsaritsyn, 1925–1961: Stalingrad), Russia.

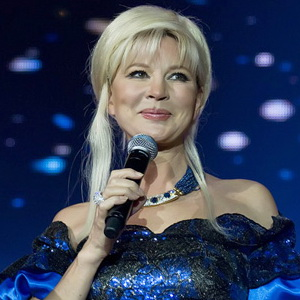
Tatyana Vedeneyeva (born 1953)

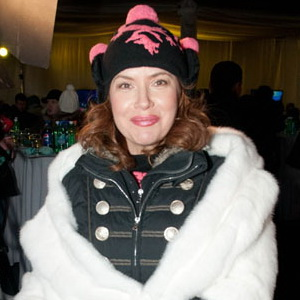
Vera Sotnikova (born 1960)

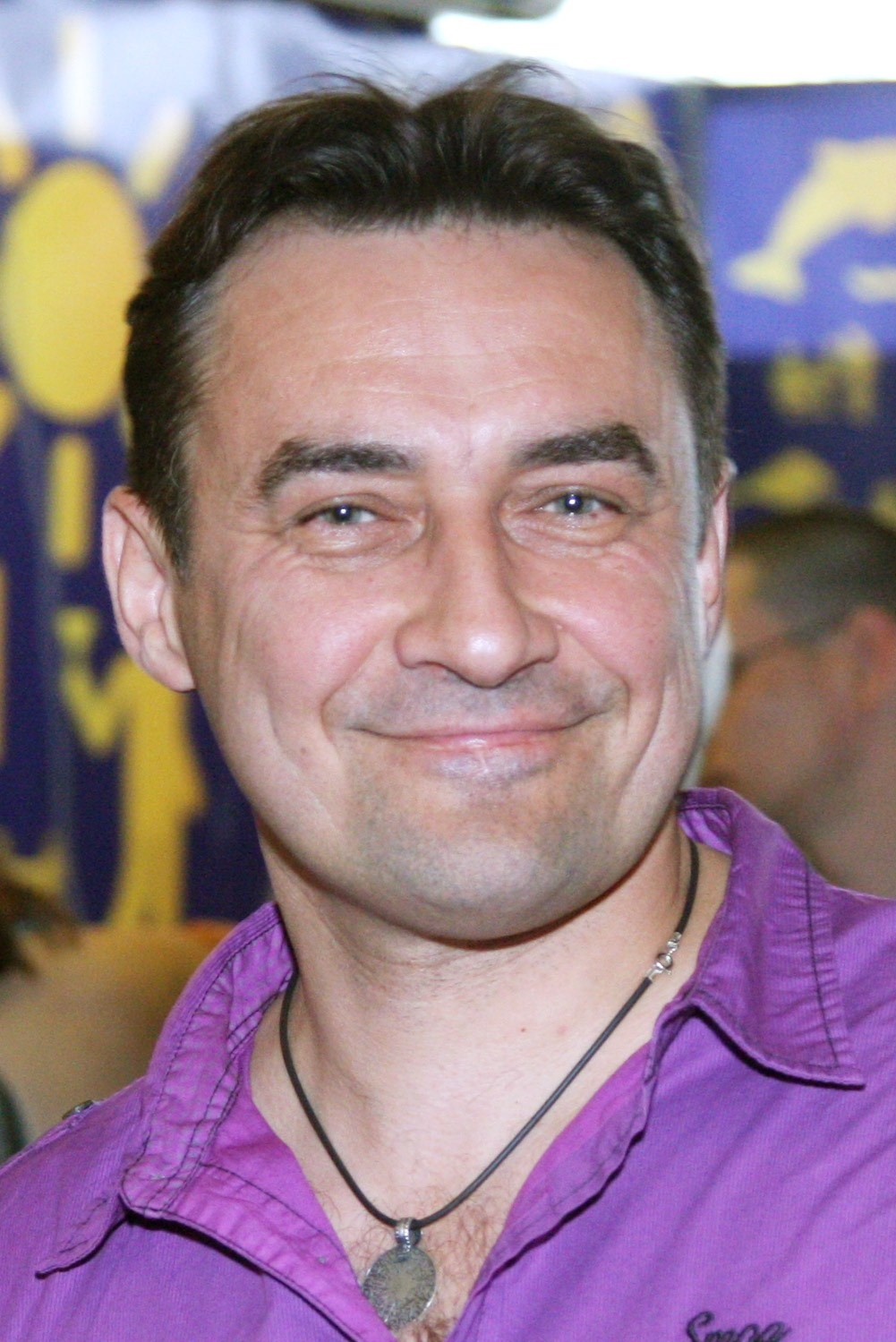
Kamil Larin (born 1966)

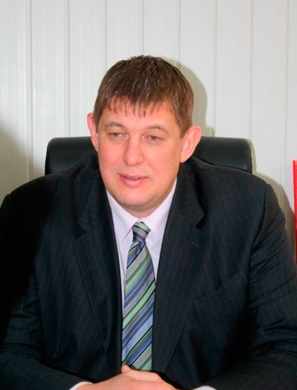
Oleg Grebnev (born 1968)

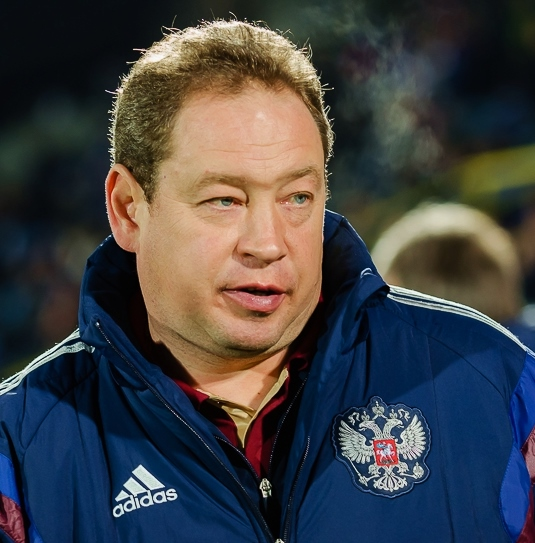
Leonid Slutsky (born 1971)

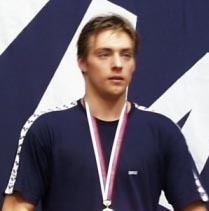
Roman Ivanovsky (born 1977)

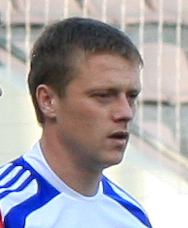
Zakhar Dubensky (born 1978)

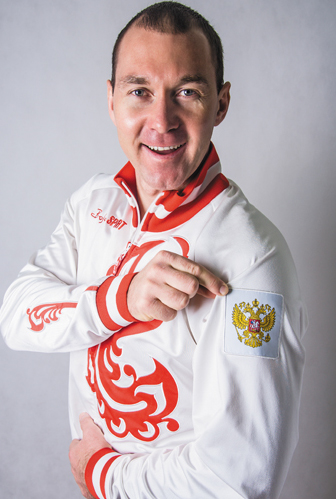
Maksim Opalev (born 1979)

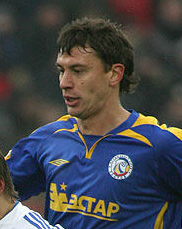
Pavel Mogilevskiy (born 1980)

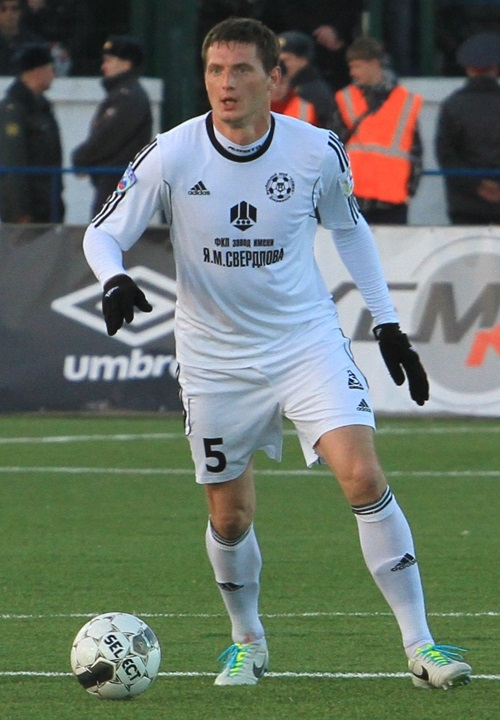
Sergei Rashevsky (born 1980)

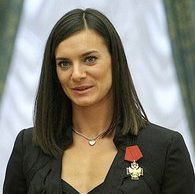
Yelena Isinbayeva (born 1982)

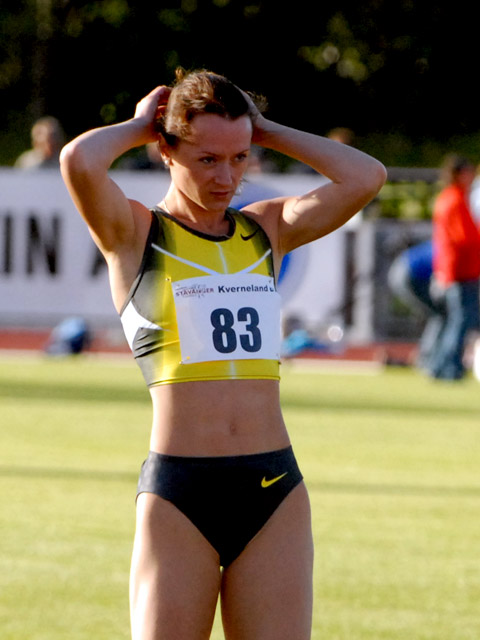
Yelena Slesarenko (born 1982)

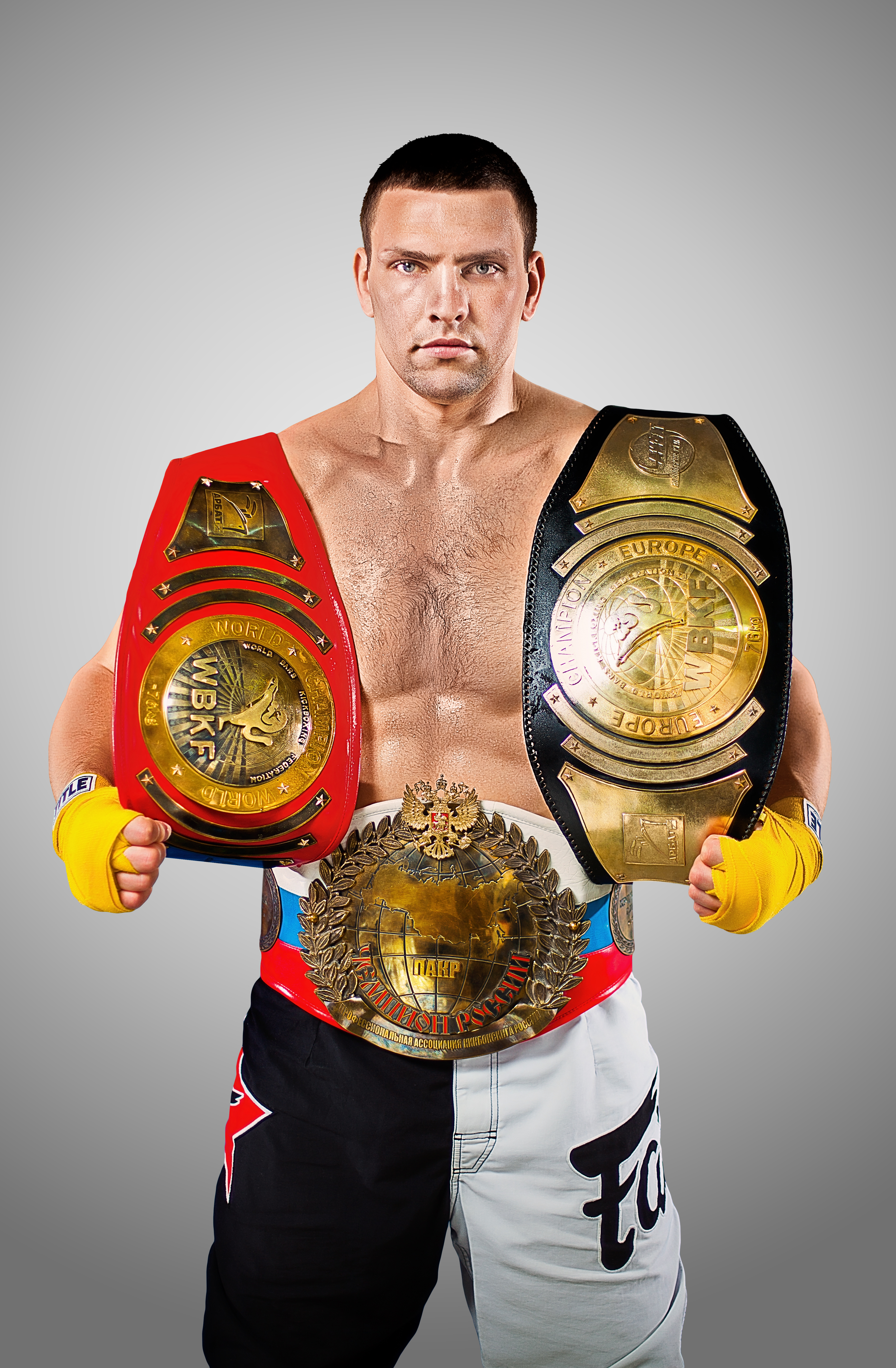
Mikhail Chalykh (born 1983)

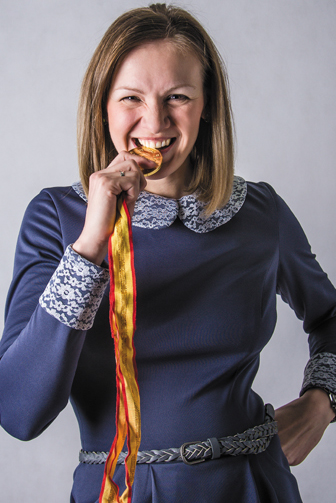
Anna Sedoykina (born 1984)

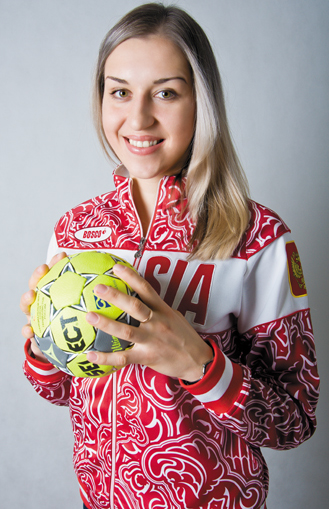
Olga Levina (born 1985)

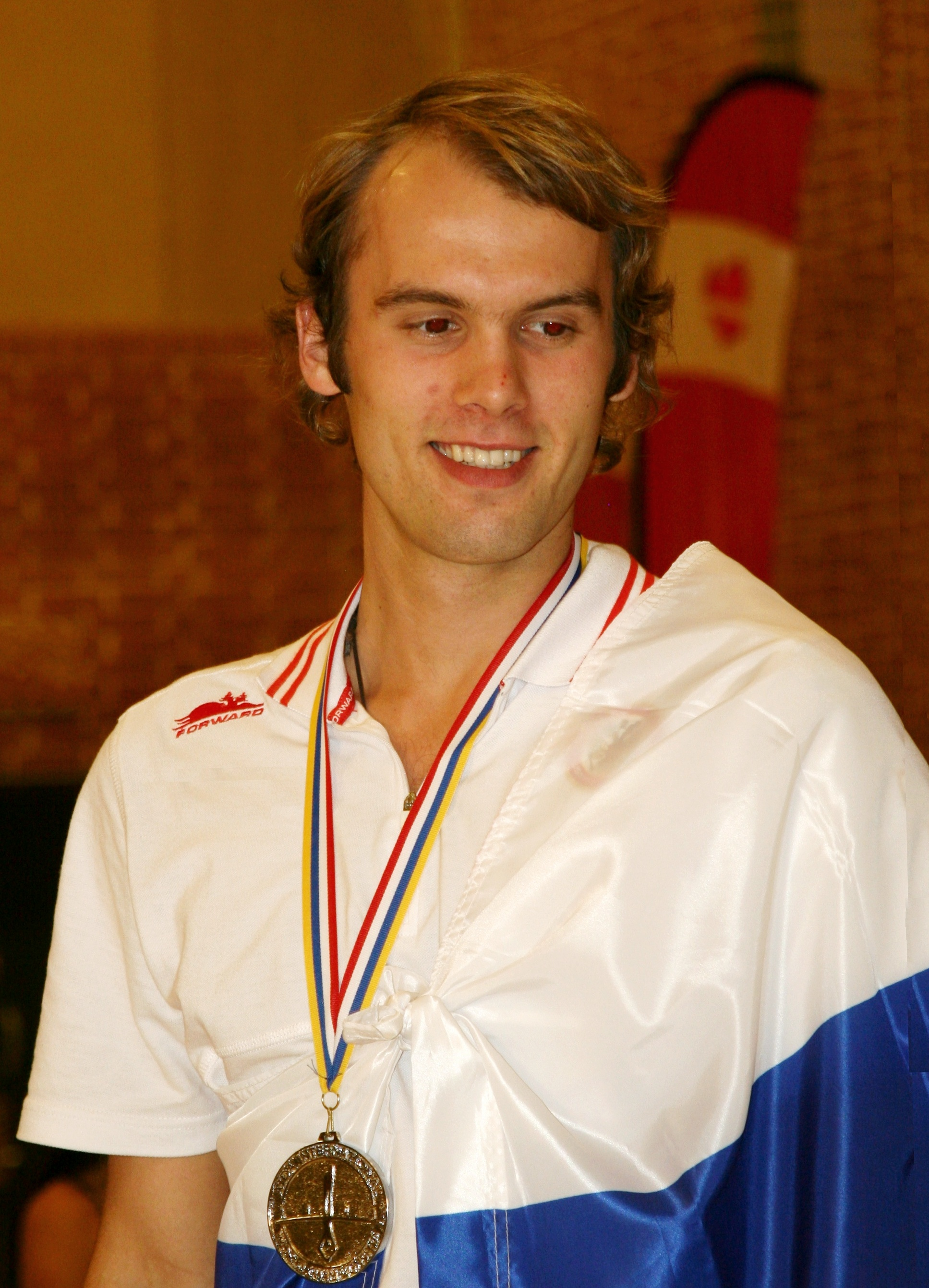
Alexey Molchanov (born 1987)

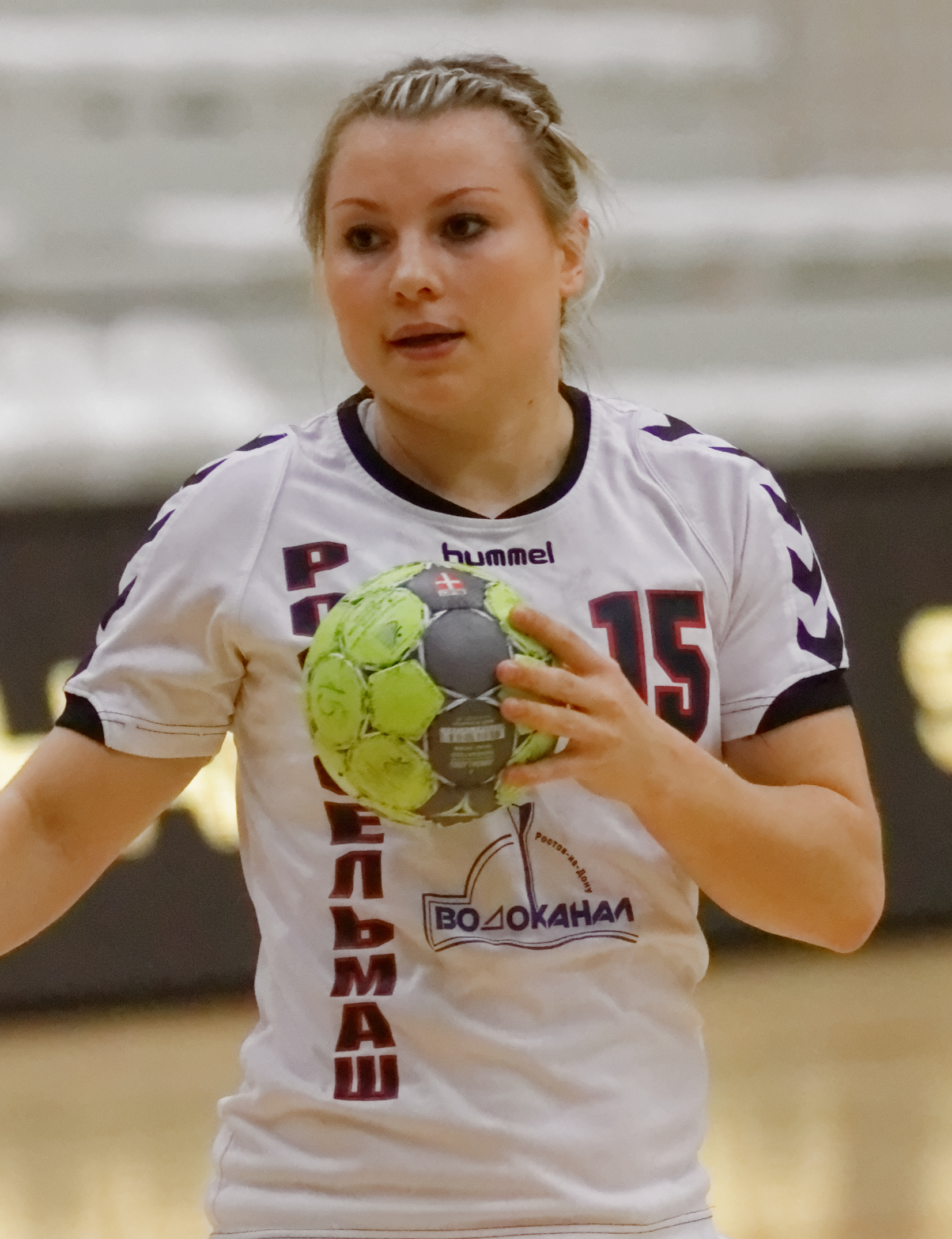
Marina Sudakova (born 1989)

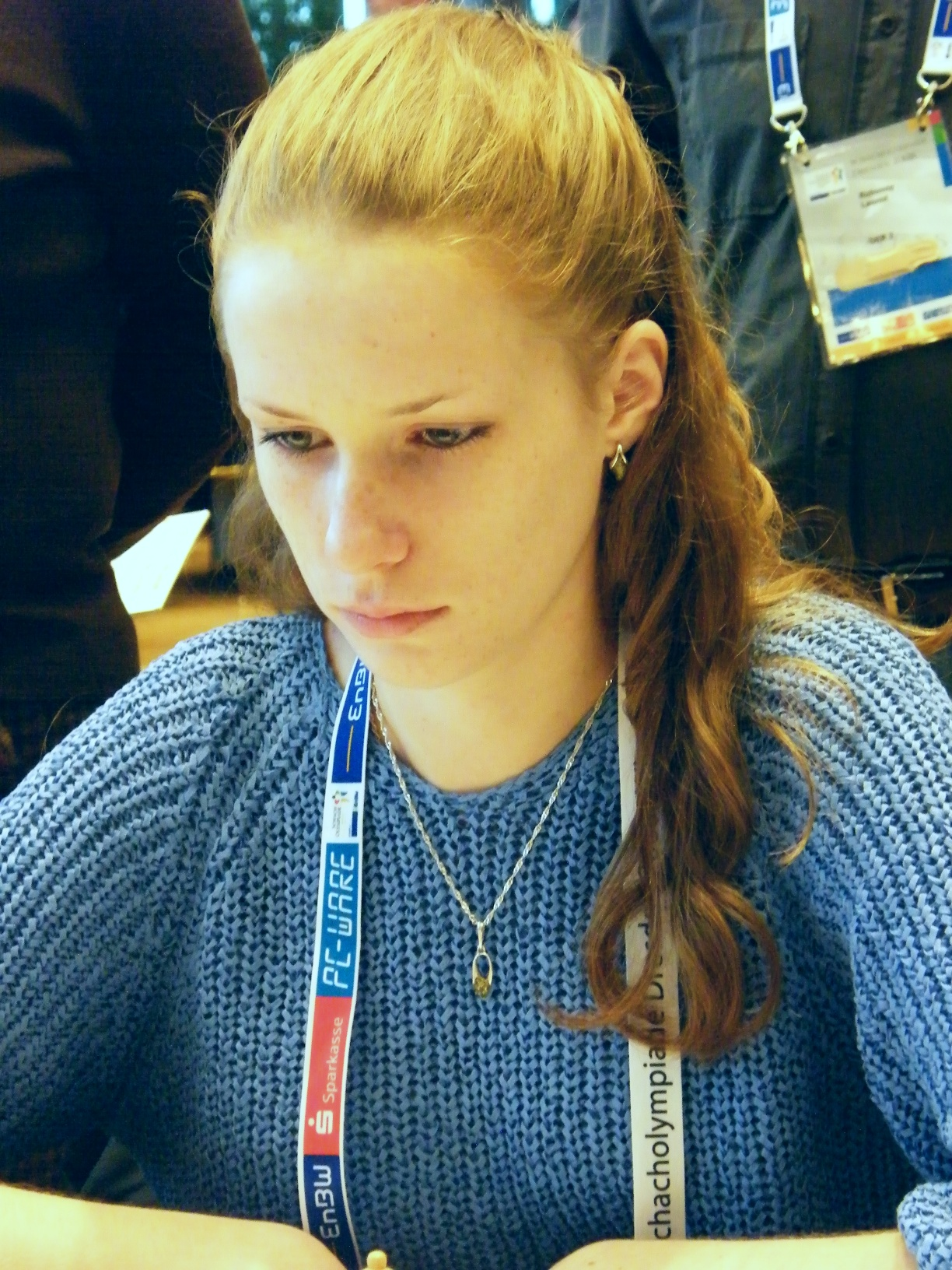
Valentina Golubenko (born 1990)

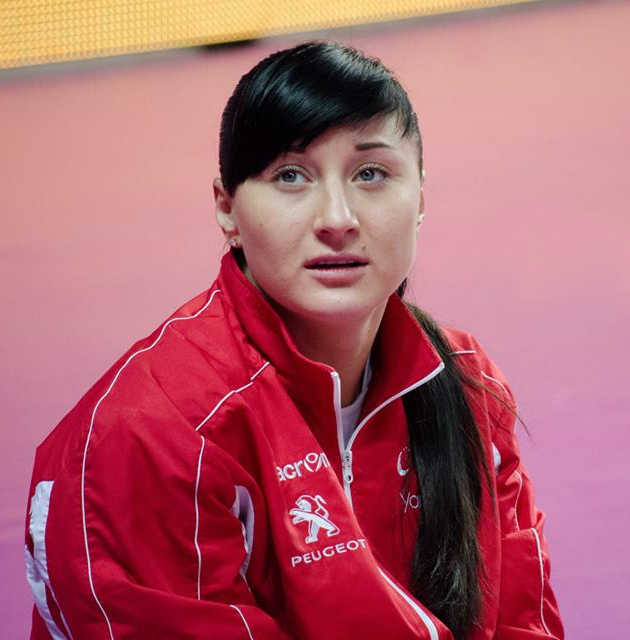
Ekaterina Lyubushkina (born 1990)

== Born in Volgograd ==
=== 19th century ===
==== 1801–1900 ====
- Heinrich Wullschlägel (1805–1864), Russia-born Dutch-German bishop, botanist and translator
- Pyotr Anokhin (1898–1974), Russian biologist and physiologist

=== 20th century ===
==== 1901–1920 ====
- Irena Białówna (1900–1982), physician
- Elena Miramova (1901–1992), Russian-born actress and playwright
- Pavel Serebryakov (1909–1977), Russian pianist
- Vasili Yermasov (1913–1990), Soviet football goalkeeper and manager
- Vasily Yefremov (1915–1990), aviation commander of the Soviet Army and ace during the Great Patriotic War, Hero of the Soviet Union
- Emma Treyvas (1918–1982), Soviet Jewish stage and film actress

==== 1921–1940 ====
- Vladimir Kryuchkov (1924–2007), Soviet lawyer, diplomat and head of the KGB
- Sasha Filippov (1925–1942), spy for the Red Army during the Battle of Stalingrad
- Gennadi Kryuchkov (1926–2007), Russian leader of the Baptist church in the Soviet Union
- Benjamin P. Yudin (1928–1983), Kazakhstan scholar of oriental studies, historian, philologist
- Boris Maluev (1929–1990), Soviet Russian painter
- Aleksandra Pakhmutova (born 1929), Soviet and Russian composer
- Oleg Trubachyov (1930–2002), Russian doctor in philology
- Elem Klimov (1933–2003), Soviet Russian film director
- Volodymyr Nemoshkalenko (1933–2002), Soviet Ukrainian physicist
- Vladimir Pasechnik (1937–2001), Soviet biologist and bioweaponeer

==== 1941–1960 ====
- Alevtina Aparina (1941–2013), Russian politician
- Ivan Karetnikov (born 1942), Soviet swimmer
- Valeriya Zaklunna (1942–2016), Soviet and Russian actress
- Yevgeni Kochergin (born 1945), Soviet and Russian speaker and presenter
- Vladimir Arzamaskov (1951–1985), Soviet Russian basketball player
- Yuri Saukh (born 1951), Soviet football player and a current Russian coach
- Vladimir Faizulin (born 1952), Russian professional football coach and a former player
- Tatyana Vedeneyeva (born 1953), Soviet and Russian actress and an anchor lady for the Soviet children program Good Night, Little Ones!
- Vera Sotnikova (born 1960), Soviet and Russian theater and film actress, TV presenter

==== 1961–1970 ====
- Aleksandr Nikitin (1961–2021), Russian professional football coach and a former player
- Vasiliy Sidorenko (born 1961), Soviet and Russian hammer thrower
- Anatoliy Volkov (born 1961), Soviet sprint canoer
- Sergei Popkov (born 1963), Russian professional football coach and a former player
- Igor Vasilyev (1964–2023), Russian handball player
- Elena Agafonnikova (born 1965), Soviet and Russian female professional basketball player
- Vadim Baykov (born 1965), Soviet and Russian composer, singer, songwriter and producer
- Oleg Mavromati (born 1965), Russian artist-actionist and a filmmaker
- Aleksey Zhukov (born 1965), Russian professional football coach and a player
- Irina Apeksimova (born 1966), Russian stage and screen actress
- Mikhail Belov (born 1966), Russian professional football coach and a former player
- Kamil Larin (born 1966), Russian actor
- Marina Abroskina (1967–2011), Russian female professional basketball player
- Lev Ivanov (born 1967), Russian professional football coach
- Vladimir Karabutov (born 1967), Russian water polo player
- Aleksandr Tsarenko (born 1967), Russian professional footballer
- Oleg Grebnev (born 1968), Russian team handball player
- Yuriy Kalitvintsev (born 1968), footballer
- Oleg Sergeyev (born 1968), Russian football player
- Eduard Malyi (born 1969), Russian football player and referee
- Valeriy Belousov (born 1970), Russian decathlete
- Valeri Burlachenko (born 1970), Russian professional football coach and a former player
- Vladimir Ovchinnikov (born 1970), Russian javelin thrower
- Svetlana Pryakhina (born 1970), Russian handball player
- Yuliya Sotnikova (born 1970), Russian world indoor champion and Olympic bronze medallist in the 4 x 400 metres relay

==== 1971–1975 ====
- Svetlana Pankratova (born 1971), has, according to Guinness World Records, the longest legs of any woman in the world
- Leonid Slutsky (born 1971), Russian professional football coach and a former player
- Vitaly Suetov (born 1971), former Russian professional footballer
- Lioubov Vassilieva (born 1971), Russian paralympic athlete
- Aleksei Babenko (born 1972), Russian professional footballer
- Igor Kshinin (born 1972), Russian male boxer
- Aleksandr Troynin (born 1972), Russian professional footballer
- Yuri Aksenov (born 1973), Kazakhstani professional footballer
- Tatyana Gordeyeva (born 1973), Russian heptathlete
- Vyacheslav Malakeev (born 1973), Russian professional football coach and a former player
- Denys Tourtchenkov (born 1973), Russian sprint canoer
- Alexander Chekurov (born 1974), Russian Paralympic swimmer
- Alexandr Gaidukov (born 1974), water polo player of Russia and Kazakhstan
- Sergei Orlov (born 1974), Russian football coach and a former player
- Denis Pankratov (born 1974), Russian butterfly swimmer
- Aleksey Petrov (born 1974), Russian weightlifter
- Sergey Pogorelov (born 1974), Russian team handball player and Olympic champion
- Marina Akobiya (born 1975), Russian water polo player, who won the bronze medal at the 2000 Summer Olympics
- Roman Babichev (born 1975), Russian professional footballer
- Aleksandr Berketov (born 1975), Russian professional football coach and a former player
- Roman Grebennikov (born 1975), Russian political figure and former Mayor of Volgograd

==== 1976–1980 ====
- Ilya Borodin (born 1976), Russian professional footballer
- Yuliya Ivanova (born 1977), Russian rhythmic gymnast
- Yelena Krivoshey (born 1977), Russian rhythmic gymnast
- Maxim Marinin (born 1977), Russian pair skater
- Roman Ivanovsky (born 1977), Russian breaststroke swimmer
- Olga Shtyrenko (born 1977), Russian rhythmic gymnast
- Vladimir Smirnov (born 1977), Russian professional footballer
- Zakhar Dubensky (born 1978), Russian football midfielder
- Alexey Kravtsov (born 1978), Russian jurist
- Albina Dzhanabaeva (born 1979), Russian singer, actress, TV-Host and from 2004 to 2013 member in the girl group VIA Gra
- Yuri Kudinov (born 1979), Russian long-distance swimmer
- Mikhail Mysin (born 1979), Russian professional footballer
- Maksim Opalev (born 1979), Russian sprint canoeist
- Dmitri Parmuzin (born 1979), Russian football coach and a former player
- Denis Pchelintsev (born 1979), Russian professional football player
- Natalya Shipilova (born 1979), Russian team handball player
- Vitaliy Shkurlatov (born 1979), Russian long jumper
- Anna Efimenko (born 1980), Russian Paralympic swimmer
- Pavel Mogilevskiy (born 1980), Russian professional footballer
- Olga Pikhienko (born 1980), Russian circus performer
- Sergei Rashevsky (born 1980), Russian footballer
- Yakiv Zalevskyi (born 1980), Russian-Ukrainian professional footballer

==== 1981–1985 ====
- Maksim Bondarenko (born 1981), Russian professional footballer
- Raman Kirenkin (born 1981), Belarusian international footballer
- Marina Lapina (born 1981), Russian-born Azerbaijani hammer thrower
- Yelena Maglevannaya (born 1981), Russian free-lance journalist
- Andrei Rekechinski (born 1981), Russian water polo player
- Yekaterina Tochenaya (born 1981), Russian-Kyrgyz swimmer
- Andrei Bochkov (born 1982), Russian footballer
- Anna Chapman (born 1982), Russian entrepreneur, television host and agent of the Russian Federation
- Aleksandr Gorbatikov (born 1982), Russian handball player
- Yelena Isinbayeva (born 1982), Russian pole vaulter, two-time Olympic gold medalist (2004 and 2008) and three-time World Champion (2005, 2007 and 2013)
- Maya Petrova (born 1982), Russian handball player
- Anton Sakharov (born 1982), Russian footballer (defender)
- Yelena Slesarenko (born 1982), Russian high jumper
- Sergei Strukov (born 1982), Russian football forward
- Mikhail Chalykh (born 1983), Russian professional heavyweight kickboxer
- Vladimir Chekunov (born 1983), Russian professional football player
- Sergei Mikhailov (born 1983), Russian professional footballer
- Dmitri Timachev (born 1983), Russian professional footballer
- Aleksei Yepifanov (born 1983), Russian professional footballer
- Igor Berezutskiy (born 1984), Russian swimmer
- Valeri Korobkin (born 1984), Kazakhstani professional football player of Russian descent
- Lev Leviev (born 1984), Internet entrepreneur and investor
- Yuliana Salakhova (born 1984), Russian sprint canoer
- Anna Sedoykina (born 1984), Russian handball player
- Olga Bakaldina (born 1985), Russian swimmer
- Olga Levina (born 1985), Russian handball player
- Olga Kucherenko (born 1985), Russian long jumper
- Alexandr Tarabrin (born 1985), Russian-Kazakhstani swimmer

==== 1986–1990 ====
- Aleksandr Katsalapov (born 1986), Russian footballer
- Yulia MacLean (born 1986), Russian-born New Zealand classical crossover singer
- Pavel Atman (born 1987), Russian handball player
- Aleksei Bondarev (born 1987), Russian footballer
- Denis Dorozhkin (born 1987), Russian professional football player
- Aleksei Druzin (born 1987), Russian professional football player
- Mikhail Kukushkin (born 1987), professional Kazakhstani tennis player of Russian origin
- Alexey Molchanov (born 1987), Russian champion freediver, five time world vice-champion and world record holder in freediving
- Artyom Varakin (born 1987), Russian footballer
- Maksim Volkov (born 1987), Russian professional football player
- Denis Biryukov (born 1988), Russian male volleyball player
- Maria Bulakhova (born 1988), Russian swimmer
- Larisa Ilchenko (born 1988), Russian long-distance swimmer. She has won eight world titles and a gold at the 2008 Olympics.
- Sergey Perunin (born 1988), Russian swimmer
- Maria Savenkov (born 1988), Israeli Olympic rhythmic gymnast
- Yulia Koltunova (born 1989), Russian diver
- Marina Sudakova (born 1989), Russian team handball player
- Valentina Golubenko (born 1990), chess Woman Grandmaster and World U-18 girls champion of 2008
- Tatyana Khmyrova (born 1990), Russian handballer
- Ekaterina Lyubushkina (born 1990), Russian volleyball player

==== 1991–2000 ====
- Oleg Li (born 1991), Russian professional ice hockey winger
- Philipp Davydenko (born 1992), Russian tennis player
- Natalia Malykh (born 1993), Russian volleyball player
- Vladimir Zubarev (born 1993), Russian football player
- Egor Koulechov (born 1994), Israeli-Russian basketball player for Israeli team Ironi Nahariya
- Polina Vedekhina (born 1994), Russian handballer
- Anna Vyakhireva (born 1995), Russian female handballer
- Anastasia Sidorova (1996), Russian artistic gymnast
- Natalia Vikhlyantseva (born 1997), Russian tennis player
- Evgeny Koptelov (born 1998), Russian swimmer

== Lived in Volgograd ==
- Kurt Adler (1907–1977), Austrian classical chorus master, music conductor, author and pianist. Founder, musical director, and first conductor of the Symphonic Orchestra Stalingrad (1935–1937).
- Vasily Zaytsev (1915–1991), Soviet sniper and Hero of the Soviet Union during World War II. Between 10 November and 17 December 1942, during the Battle of Stalingrad, he killed 225 soldiers and officers of the Wehrmacht and other Axis armies, including 11 enemy snipers.
- Larisa Gorchakova (born 1964), Russian backstroke swimmer, who won a bronze medal at the 1982 World Aquatics Championships
- Oleg Veretennikov (born 1970), professional association football coach and a former international footballer
- Yevgeny Sadovyi (born 1973), Russian freestyle swimmer
- Nikolay Davydenko (born 1981), Russian former professional tennis player.
- Evgeni Plushenko (born 1982), Russian figure skater, four-time Olympic medalist, three-time World champion, seven-time European champion, four-time Grand Prix Final champion and a ten-time Russian national champion. Plushenko lived in Volgograd before moving to Saint Petersburg in 1994.
- Viktor Borisov (born 1985), Russian professional footballer

== See also ==
- List of Russian people
- List of Russian-language poets
