= Robert Ivanov =

Finnish footballer (born 1994)

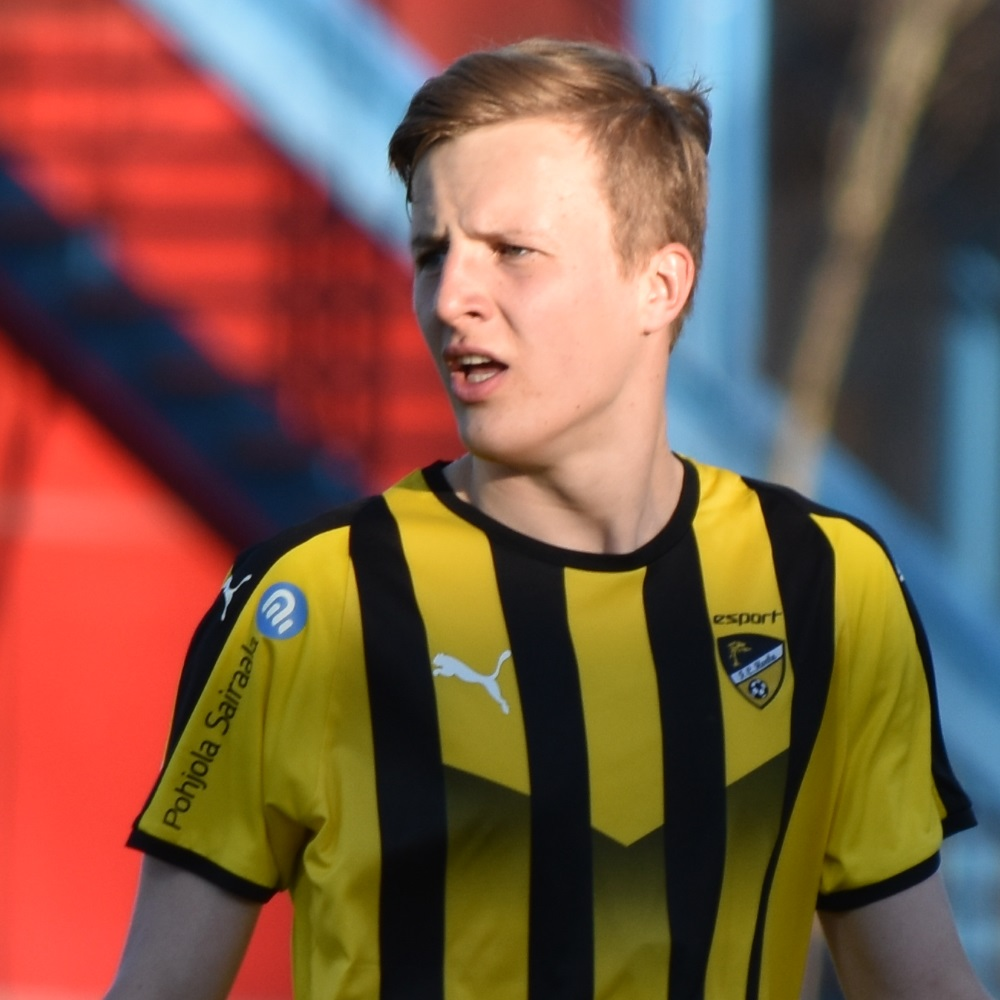
- Ivanov with Honka in 2018

Personal information
- Date of birth: 19 September 1994 (age 32)
- Place of birth: Helsinki, Finland
- Height: 1.97 m (6 ft 6 in)
- Position: Centre-back

Team information
- Current team: Inter Turku
- Number: 6

Youth career
- 1998–2002: Kontu
- 2003–2010: HJK
- 2011: PK-35
- 2012: LPS

Senior career*
Years	Team	Apps	(Gls)
2013–2014	Myllypuro	35	(6)
2015	Viikingit	19	(3)
2015	→ Viikingit II	1	(1)
2016–2020	Honka	115	(13)
2020–2023	Warta Poznań	84	(2)
2023–2025	Eintracht Braunschweig	46	(1)
2025–2026	Asteras Tripolis	18	(1)
2026–	Inter Turku	10	(0)

International career^{‡}
2019–	Finland	45	(0)
- * Club domestic league appearances and goals as of 22:18, 10 November 2026 (UTC) ‡ National team caps and goals as of 18:53, 15 November 2026 (UTC)

Robert Ivanov (born 19 September 1994) is a Finnish professional footballer who plays as a centre-back for Veikkausliiga club Inter Turku and the Finland national team.

Ivanov began his career with Kontu, and made his senior debut aged 18 in 2013 with Myllypuro.

== Club career ==
=== FC Myllypuro ===
Ivanov started his senior career with FC Myllypuro in 2013, competing in Kolmonen. After the promotion, he continued with the team in third-tier Kakkonen.

=== Viikingit ===
He joined FC Viikingit for the 2015 season and made 19 appearances in the first team and 4 in the reserve team. After one season with Viikingit in Kakkonen, he joined FC Honka for the 2016 Kakkonen season.

=== Honka ===
With Honka he won two consecutive promotions, and eventually Ivanov debuted in the top-tier Veikkausliiga with Honka in 2018. He was part of the Veikkausliiga Team of the Month for July 2018, and September 2018.

=== Warta Poznań ===
On 1 September 2020, he signed an initial two-year contract with Polish Ekstraklasa club Warta Poznań for an undisclosed fee.

=== Eintracht Braunschweig ===
On 16 June 2023, it was announced that Ivanov had signed a two-year deal with 2. Bundesliga club Eintracht Braunschweig on a free transfer. Ivanov scored his first goal for the club on 8 October 2023, in a 3–1 home defeat against Paderborn. In June 2025, it was announced that Ivanov would leave Braunschweig following the expiry of his contract, having not played since March due to minor injury.

=== Asteras Tripolis ===
On 13 August 2025, Ivanov signed a two-year contract with Asteras Tripolis in Greece. On 24 August 2026, his contract was terminated by mutual agreement.

=== FC Inter Turku ===
On 24 August 2026, Ivanov returned to Finland and joined Veikkausliiga club Inter Turku on a deal until the end of 2028.

== International career ==
Having never played for any of the Finland international youth teams, Ivanov made his debut for the Finland senior national team on 8 January 2019 at the age of 24, in a friendly against Sweden, coming on an 85th-minute substitute for Albin Granlund.

Ivanov was called up for the UEFA Euro 2020 pre-tournament friendly match against Sweden on 29 May 2021. He was part of the Finland squad in the delayed UEFA Euro 2020 in June 2021.

== Personal life ==
Ivanov was born in Helsinki to an Ingrian Finnish mother and a Russian father and was raised in Kurkimäki, East Helsinki. His mother Nelli Pakki, a former Estonian international handball player, had moved to Finland from Estonia earlier in 1990. Besides professional football, Ivanov has played futsal in MaKu.

== Career statistics ==
=== Club ===
As of match played 8 November 2026

Appearances and goals by club, season and competition
Club	Season	League			National cup (Note: Includes Suomen Cup, Polish Cup, DFB-Pokal and Greek Cup)		Europe		Total	
Club	Season	Division	Apps	Goals	Apps	Goals	Apps	Goals	Apps	Goals
FC Myllypuro	2013	Kolmonen	21	4	0	0	—		21	4
FC Myllypuro	2014	Kakkonen	14	2	0	0	—		14	2
FC Myllypuro	Total		35	6	0	0	0	0	35	6
FC Viikingit	2015	Kakkonen	19	3	1	0	—		20	3
FC Viikingit II	2015	Kolmonen	1	1	—		—		1	1
FC Honka	2016	Kakkonen	22	5	4	0	—		27	5
FC Honka	2017	Ykkönen	24	3	6	3	—		30	6
FC Honka	2018	Veikkausliiga	30	3	7	1	—		37	4
FC Honka	2019	Veikkausliiga	29	2	7	1	—		36	3
FC Honka	2020	Veikkausliiga	10	0	6	0	1 (Note: Appearance in UEFA Europa League)	0	17	0
FC Honka	Total		115	13	30	5	1	0	146	18
Warta Poznań	2020–21	Ekstraklasa	22	0	1	0	—		23	0
Warta Poznań	2021–22	Ekstraklasa	31	1	1	0	—		32	1
Warta Poznań	2022–23	Ekstraklasa	31	1	1	0	—		32	1
Warta Poznań	Total		84	2	3	0	0	0	87	2
Eintracht Braunschweig	2023–24	2. Bundesliga	27	1	0	0	—		27	1
Eintracht Braunschweig	2024–25	2. Bundesliga	19	0	1	0	—		20	0
Eintracht Braunschweig	Total		46	1	1	0	0	0	47	1
Asteras Tripolis	2025–26	Super League Greece	18	1	1	0	—		19	1
Inter Turku	2026	Veikkausliiga	10	0	1	0	0	0	11	0
Career total			327	27	37	5	1	0	365	32

=== International ===
As of match played 15 November 2026

Appearances and goals by national team and year
National team	Year	Apps	Goals
Finland	2019	2	0
Finland	2020	0	0
Finland	2021	6	0
Finland	2022	9	0
Finland	2023	10	0
Finland	2024	8	0
Finland	2025	8	0
Finland	2026	2	0
Total		45	0

== Honours ==
Honka

- Ykkönen runner-up: 2017

Inter Turku

- Veikkausliiga: 2026
- Finnish Cup: 2026
