= 2014 Kakkonen =

Kakkonen
- Season: 2014

The 2014 Kakkonen season started on 18 April and ended on 4 October 2014.

== Teams ==
A total of 40 teams contested the league divided into four groups, Eteläinen (Southern), Pohjoinen (Northern), Läntinen (Western) and Itäinen (Eastern). 29 returning from the 2013 season, two relegated from Ykkönen and nine promoted from Kolmonen. The champion of each group qualified to promotion matches to decide which two teams get promoted to the Ykkönen. The bottom two teams in each group and the worst eight-placed qualified directly for relegation to Kolmonen. Each team played a total of 27 matches, three times against each team of its group.

AC Kajaani and OPS were relegated from the 2013 Ykkönen, while FC Jazz and HIFK were promoted to the 2014 Ykkönen.

EsPa, FC POHU, Härmä, LPS, MuSa, ORPa, Sudet and Tervarit were relegated from 2013 Kakkonen.

FC Espoo, FC Myllypuro, FC Viikkarit, I-Kissat, JBK, OLS, SC KuFu-98 and SOVO were promoted from the 2013 Kolmonen.

SavU (winner of Kolmonen Kaakkois-Suomi) didn't take its place in 2014 Kakkonen. Its place was given for JäPS, the worst eight-placed of the last season.

KTP merged with FC KooTeePee. Its place was given for Kultsu FC, the runner-up of Kolmonen Kaakkois-Suomi.

=== Stadia and locations ===
Location of the 2014 Kakkonen teams. Eteläinen (Southern) are red dots, Pohjoinen (Northern) are green dots, Läntinen (Western) are blue dots while Itäinen (Eastern) are pink dots.

Team	Location	Stadium	Stadium capacity
AC Kajaani	Kajaani	Kajaanin liikuntapuisto	1,000
ÅIFK	Turku	Urheilupuiston yläkenttä	1,500
Atlantis FC	Helsinki	Töölön Pallokenttä	4,000
BK-46	Raseborg	Karjaan urheilukenttä	1,000
EIF	Raseborg	Ekenäs Centrumplan	2,500
FC Espoo	Espoo	Leppävaaran stadion	5,000
FC Futura	Porvoo	Porvoon keskuskenttä	500
FC Hämeenlinna	Hämeenlinna	Kaurialan kenttä	4,000
FC Lahti Akatemia	Lahti	Kisapuisto	4,400
FC Myllypuro	Helsinki	Myllypuro	300
FC Viikkarit	Helsinki	Vuosaaren urheilukenttä	4,200
FC YPA	Ylivieska	Safari	600
GBK	Kokkola	Kokkolan keskuskenttä	3,000
Gnistan	Helsinki	Fair Pay Arena	2,000
GrIFK	Kauniainen	Kauniaisten Keskuskenttä	700
I-Kissat	Tampere	Tammela Stadion	5,040
JäPS	Järvenpää	Järvenpään keskuskenttä	500
JBK	Jakobstad	Länsikenttä	300
Kerho 07	Seinäjoki	Seinäjoen keskuskenttä	3,500
KäPa	Helsinki	Max Westerberg Areena	1,000
Klubi 04	Helsinki	Sonera Stadium	10,770
KPV	Kokkola	Kokkolan keskuskenttä	2,000
Kultsu FC	Lappeenranta	Joutsenon keskuskenttä	960
Masku	Masku	Taponketo	N/A
MP	Mikkeli	Mikkelin Urheilupuisto	7,000
Närpes Kraft	Närpes	Mosedal	2,000
OLS	Oulu	Raatin Stadion	6,996
OPS	Oulu	Raatin Stadion	6,996
P-Iirot	Rauma	Äijänsuon stadion	2,000
Pallohonka	Espoo	Otaniemen urheilukeskus	500
PK-37	Iisalmi	Sankariniemi	5,000
PK Keski-Uusimaa	Kerava	Kalevan UP nurmi	2,000
PS Kemi	Kemi	Sauvosaari	1,500
SalPa	Salo	Salon Urheilupuisto	2,500
SC KuFu-98	Kuopio	Savon Sanomat Areena	5,000
SOVO	Somero	Someron urheilukenttä	2,500
Sporting	Kristinestad	Kristinaplan	2,000
TP-47	Tornio	Pohjan Stadion	4,000
TPV	Tampere	Tammela Stadion	5,040
VIFK	Vaasa	Hietalahti Stadium	4,600

== League tables ==
=== Eteläinen (Southern) ===
Pos	Team	Pld	W	D	L	GF	GA	GD	Pts	Qualification or relegation
1	EIF	27	20	4	3	69	33	+36	64	Qualification to Promotion playoffs
2	GrIFK	27	18	3	6	72	27	+45	57	
3	BK-46	27	15	6	6	68	40	+28	51	
4	KäPa	27	11	6	10	52	46	+6	39	
5	Klubi 04	27	11	5	11	36	48	−12	38	
6	SalPa	27	11	2	14	49	45	+4	35	
7	Pallohonka	27	8	5	14	37	47	−10	29	
8	Gnistan	27	7	8	12	32	46	−14	29	
9	SOVO (R)	27	7	2	18	29	68	−39	23	Relegation to Kolmonen
10	FC Espoo (R)	27	2	9	16	26	70	−44	15	Relegation to Kolmonen

Source: palloverkko.palloliitto.fi
Rules for classification: 1) points; 2) goal difference; 3) number of goals scored.
(R) Relegated

=== Pohjoinen (Northern) ===
Pos	Team	Pld	W	D	L	GF	GA	GD	Pts	Qualification or relegation
1	PS Kemi	27	20	2	5	63	24	+39	62	Qualification to Promotion playoffs
2	FC YPA	27	18	6	3	50	20	+30	60	
3	AC Kajaani	27	11	11	5	31	20	+11	44	
4	GBK	27	13	3	11	45	36	+9	42	
5	OPS	27	12	6	9	44	37	+7	42	
6	KPV	27	9	7	11	28	35	−7	34	
7	TP-47	27	7	10	10	35	37	−2	31	
8	JBK (R)	27	5	9	13	27	44	−17	24	Relegation to Kolmonen
9	PK-37 (R)	27	4	6	17	23	67	−44	18	Relegation to Kolmonen
10	OLS (R)	27	4	4	19	21	47	−26	16	Relegation to Kolmonen

Source: palloverkko.palloliitto.fi
Rules for classification: 1) points; 2) goal difference; 3) number of goals scored.
(R) Relegated

=== Läntinen (Western) ===
Pos	Team	Pld	W	D	L	GF	GA	GD	Pts	Qualification or relegation
1	VIFK	27	17	5	5	60	35	+25	56	Qualification to Promotion playoffs
2	ÅIFK	27	14	5	8	49	35	+14	47	
3	Närpes Kraft	27	13	4	10	49	45	+4	43	
4	TPV	27	12	6	9	52	41	+11	42	
5	Masku	27	10	9	8	43	38	+5	39	
6	Kerho 07	27	11	5	11	44	40	+4	38	
7	I-Kissat	27	10	8	9	37	36	+1	38	
8	P-Iirot	27	9	6	12	51	56	−5	33	
9	FC Hämeenlinna (R)	27	8	4	15	46	54	−8	28	Relegation to Kolmonen
10	Sporting (R)	27	4	2	21	24	75	−51	14	Relegation to Kolmonen

Source: palloverkko.palloliitto.fi
Rules for classification: 1) points; 2) goal difference; 3) number of goals scored.
(R) Relegated

=== Itäinen (Eastern) ===
Pos	Team	Pld	W	D	L	GF	GA	GD	Pts	Qualification or relegation
1	Atlantis FC	27	22	2	3	76	25	+51	68	Qualification to Promotion playoffs
2	MP	27	15	6	6	54	34	+20	51	
3	JäPS	27	13	4	10	55	38	+17	43	
4	FC Futura	27	11	5	11	34	32	+2	38	
5	PK Keski-Uusimaa	27	11	5	11	47	50	−3	38	
6	FC Myllypuro	27	11	4	12	56	54	+2	37	
7	FC Lahti Akatemia	27	8	7	12	41	46	−5	31	
8	Kultsu FC	27	9	4	14	31	51	−20	31	
9	SC KuFu-98 (R)	27	9	3	15	26	51	−25	30	Relegation to Kolmonen
10	FC Viikkarit (R)	27	3	6	18	28	67	−39	15	Relegation to Kolmonen

Source: palloverkko.palloliitto.fi
Rules for classification: 1) points; 2) goal difference; 3) number of goals scored.
(R) Relegated

=== Promotion play-offs ===
Group winners will play two-legged ties. Team pairs will be drawn and the two winning teams will be promoted to the Ykkönen for season 2015.

Group winners

- Eteläinen (Southern): EIF
- Pohjoinen (Northern): PS Kemi
- Läntinen (Western): VIFK
- Itäinen (Eastern): Atlantis FC

==== First leg ====
12 October 2014

EIF	3 – 3	Atlantis FC
Gerxhaliu 26'; Konate 64'; Kaufmann 65'		Bergström 52'; Jalloh 70'; Tukiainen 82'; Gibba (second yellow card) 71'

Ekenäs Centrumplan, Raseborg
Attendance: 1,350

12 October 2014

PS Kemi	1 – 0	VIFK
Jovović 18'

Sauvosaari, Kemi
Attendance: 877

==== Second leg ====
18 October 2014

Atlantis FC	1 – 3	EIF
Äijälä 18'		Konate 20', 88'; Estlander 61' (pen.)

Töölön Pallokenttä, Helsinki
Attendance: 932

EIF won 6–4 on aggregate.

18 October 2014

VIFK	0 – 3	PS Kemi
		Jovović 35', 72'; Haanpää 87'

Hietalahti, Vaasa
Attendance: 835

PS Kemi won 4–0 on aggregate.

=== Eight-placed teams ===
At the end of the season, a comparison is made between the eight-placed teams. The worst eight-placed team will be directly relegated to the Kolmonen.

Pos	Grp	Team	Pld	W	D	L	GF	GA	GD	Pts	Relegation
1	West	P-Iirot	27	9	6	12	51	56	−5	33	
2	East	Kultsu FC	27	9	4	14	31	51	−20	31	
3	South	Gnistan	27	7	8	12	32	46	−14	29	
4	North	JBK (R)	27	5	9	13	27	44	−17	24	Relegation to Kolmonen

Rules for classification: 1) points; 2) goal difference; 3) number of goals scored.
(R) Relegated

== See also ==
- 2014 Veikkausliiga
- 2014 Ykkönen
