= FC Viikkarit =

Football team

- Full name: FC Viikkarit
- Founded: 2007
- Ground: Heteniitty
- Chairman: Mika Forsman
- Manager: Alexei Zhukov
- League: Kakkonen
- 2013: Kolmonen, 1st
- Website: http://www.fcviikingit.com
Home colours	Away colours

FC Viikkarit (previously FC Viikingit/2) are a Finnish association football team based in Vuosaari, East Helsinki. They play in the Kakkonen, the third tier of football in Finland, and are the reserve team of second-tier club FC Viikingit. The reserve team was established in 2007 and won promotion to the Kakkonen after the 2013 season. The team is managed by Alexei Zhukov, who had a long career as a player for the first team of the East Helsinki club.

== History ==
FC Viikingit/2 was founded as the reserve team of FC Viikingit for the 2007 season, when the first team was promoted to the Veikkausliiga. The team started out in the third division (Kolmonen) and did moderately well, finishing between 5th and 9th in its first seasons up to 2011. For the 2012 season, the club began to invest more in the success of the reserve team. Cooperation between the first team, the reserve team and youth teams was increased, and former first-team players Alexei Zhukov and Vitali Suetov were hired to coach the reserves. As a result, the team did well in the 2012 Kolmonen, but the close-run season ended with FC Viikingit/2 in fourth place, just two points behind group winners FC POHU, who were promoted to the second division.

In 2013, the reserve team led by Zhukov consisted mostly of FC Viikingit Under-19s with a few older players. The young side enjoyed success both in the Kolmonen and in the 2013 Finnish Cup. In the cup, they progressed to the fifth round, knocking out two-second-division clubs (JäPS and PK Keski-Uusimaa), before finally losing out to FC Jazz, who went on to achieve promotion to the Ykkönen at the end of the season. In the league, FC Viikingit/2 held on to first place for most of the season. They secured their first-place finish, and therefore promotion, on the penultimate match day by beating East Helsinki local rivals Herttoniemen Toverit.

For the 2014 season, the team changed its name to FC Viikkarit. They will play in the Eastern group of the 2014 Kakkonen, with the aim of succeeding in the competition and developing the club's players in cooperation with the first team and youth teams. Reserve team manager Alexei Zhukov signed a new contract in December 2013, and will therefore remain in charge for the upcoming season. The home ground for 2014 has not yet been announced. In 2013, the team played their home matches at Kartanon kenttä in Nordsjön kartano. However, the ground does not, at least in its current state, fulfil second-division requirements due to e.g. lack of sufficient seating, and therefore cannot host Kakkonen matches without major changes.

=== Season records ===
Season	League	Pos	PM	W	D	L	GD	P
2007	Kolmonen (group 3)	7th	22	8	5	9	33–41	29
2008	Kolmonen (group 2)	5th	22	10	4	8	37–34	34
2009	Kolmonen (group 2)	6th	22	8	1	13	41–45	25
2010	Kolmonen (group 2)	8th	22	8	4	10	36–46	28
2011	Kolmonen (group 3)	9th	22	9	2	11	31–44	29
2012	Kolmonen (group 3)	4th	22	15	2	5	58–19	47
2013	Kolmonen (group 3)	1st	22	14	5	3	58–17	47
