= 2013 Kakkonen =

Kakkonen
- Season: 2013

The season started on 20 April 2013 and is scheduled to end on 5 October 2013.

== Teams ==
A total of 40 teams will contest the league divided into four groups, Eteläinen (Southern), Pohjoinen (Northern), Läntinen (Western) and Itäinen (Eastern). 30 returning from the 2012 season, two relegated from Ykkönen and eight promoted from Kolmonen. The champion of each group will qualify to promotion matches to decide which two teams get promoted to the Ykkönen. The bottom two teams in each group and the worst eight-placed will qualify directly for relegation to Kolmonen. Each team will play a total of 27 matches, playing three times against each team of its group.

FC Hämeenlinna and HIFK were relegated from the 2012 Ykkönen, while AC Kajaani and Ilves were promoted to the 2013 Ykkönen.

FC Espoo, FC Kiffen, FC Kiisto, HauPa, JIlves, LoPa and PK-35/VJS were relegated from 2012 Kakkonen.

FC POHU, Kerho 07, KäPa, Masku, MuSa, ORPa, PK Keski-Uusimaa, Sudet and Tervarit were promoted from the 2012 Kolmonen.

SiPS didn't take its place in 2013 Kakkonen. Its place was given for Sporting Kristina, the worst eight-placed of the last season.

ORPa took the place of FC Santa Claus for the 2013 season when the club went bankrupt after the 2012 season.

Warkaus JK was excluded from the Kakkonen due to breaking the rules of the association.

=== Stadia and Locations ===
Location of the 2013 Kakkonen teams. Eteläinen (Southern) are red dots, Pohjoinen (Northern) are green dots, Läntinen (Western) are blue dots while Itäinen (Eastern) are pink dots.

| Team | Location | Stadium | Stadium capacity |
|---|---|---|---|
| ÅIFK | Turku | Urheilupuiston yläkenttä | 1,500 |
| Atlantis FC | Helsinki | Töölön Pallokenttä | 4,000 |
| BK-46 | Raseborg | Karjaan urheilukenttä | 1,000 |
| EIF | Raseborg | Ekenäs Centrumplan | 2,500 |
| EsPa | Espoo | Matinkylän tekonurmi | N/A |
| FC Futura | Porvoo | Porvoon keskuskenttä | 500 |
| FC Hämeenlinna | Hämeenlinna | Kaurialan kenttä | 4,000 |
| FC Jazz | Pori | Porin Stadion | 12,000 |
| FC Lahti Akatemia | Lahti | Kisapuisto | 4,400 |
| FC POHU | Helsinki | Tali N1 | N/A |
| FC YPA | Ylivieska | Safari | 600 |
| GBK | Kokkola | Kokkolan keskuskenttä | 3,000 |
| Gnistan | Helsinki | Fair Pay Arena | 2,000 |
| GrIFK | Kauniainen | Kauniaisten Keskuskenttä | 700 |
| Härmä | Hämeenlinna | Kauriala | 4,000 |
| HIFK | Helsinki | Brahen kenttä | 2,000 |
| JäPS | Järvenpää | Järvenpään keskuskenttä | 500 |
| Kerho 07 | Seinäjoki | Seinäjoen keskuskenttä | 3,500 |
| Klubi 04 | Helsinki | Sonera Stadium | 10,770 |
| KPV | Kokkola | Kokkolan keskuskenttä | 2,000 |
| KTP | Kotka | Arto Tolsa Areena | 4,780 |
| KäPa | Helsinki | Max Westerberg Areena | 1,000 |
| LPS | Helsinki | Laajasalon urheilupuisto | N/A |
| Masku | Masku | Taponketo | N/A |
| MP | Mikkeli | Mikkelin Urheilupuisto | 7,000 |
| MuSa | Pori | Musan kenttä | 700 |
| Närpes Kraft | Närpes | Mosedal | 2,000 |
| ORPa | Oulu | Castrén | 4,000 |
| P-Iirot | Rauma | Äijänsuon stadion | 2,000 |
| Pallohonka | Espoo | Otaniemen urheilukeskus | 500 |
| PK-37 | Iisalmi | Sankariniemi | 5,000 |
| PK Keski-Uusimaa | Kerava | Kalevan UP nurmi | N/A |
| PS Kemi | Kemi | Sauvosaari | 1,500 |
| SalPa | Salo | Salon Urheilupuisto | 2,500 |
| Sporting | Kristinestad | Kristinaplan | 2,000 |
| Sudet | Kouvola | Kouvolan keskuskenttä | 12,000 |
| Tervarit | Oulu | Castrén | 4,000 |
| TP-47 | Tornio | Pohjan Stadion | 4,000 |
| TPV | Tampere | Tammela Stadion | 5,040 |
| VIFK | Vaasa | Hietalahti Stadium | 4,600 |

== League tables ==
=== Eteläinen (Southern) ===
| Pos | Team | Pld | W | D | L | GF | GA | GD | Pts | Qualification or relegation |
|---|---|---|---|---|---|---|---|---|---|---|
| 1 | EIF (A) | 27 | 16 | 9 | 2 | 52 | 25 | +27 | 57 | Qualification to Promotion playoffs |
| 2 | Gnistan | 27 | 15 | 7 | 5 | 51 | 26 | +25 | 52 | |
| 3 | GrIFK | 27 | 14 | 6 | 7 | 50 | 39 | +11 | 48 | |
| 4 | BK-46 | 27 | 15 | 0 | 12 | 50 | 35 | +15 | 45 | |
| 5 | Klubi 04 | 27 | 11 | 4 | 12 | 27 | 29 | −2 | 37 | |
| 6 | SalPa | 27 | 10 | 5 | 12 | 38 | 36 | +2 | 35 | |
| 7 | KäPa | 27 | 9 | 7 | 11 | 33 | 36 | −3 | 34 | |
| 8 | Pallohonka | 27 | 8 | 9 | 10 | 32 | 36 | −4 | 33 | |
| 9 | EsPa (R) | 27 | 4 | 6 | 17 | 21 | 58 | −37 | 18 | Relegation to Kolmonen |
| 10 | LPS (R) | 27 | 4 | 5 | 18 | 23 | 57 | −34 | 17 | Relegation to Kolmonen |

Source: palloverkko.palloliitto.fi
Rules for classification: 1) points; 2) goal difference; 3) number of goals scored.
(A) Advance to a further round; (R) Relegated

=== Pohjoinen (Northern) ===
| Pos | Team | Pld | W | D | L | GF | GA | GD | Pts | Qualification or relegation |
|---|---|---|---|---|---|---|---|---|---|---|
| 1 | PS Kemi (A) | 27 | 19 | 4 | 4 | 63 | 24 | +39 | 61 | Qualification to Promotion playoffs |
| 2 | FC YPA | 27 | 17 | 4 | 6 | 63 | 32 | +31 | 55 | |
| 3 | VIFK (Note: The match VIFK – ORPa on August 25 originally finished 1–0, but the result was changed to 0–3, as VIFK fielded an ineligible player.) | 27 | 13 | 6 | 8 | 50 | 35 | +15 | 45 | |
| 4 | TP-47 | 27 | 12 | 5 | 10 | 45 | 39 | +6 | 41 | |
| 5 | GBK | 27 | 12 | 4 | 11 | 48 | 51 | −3 | 40 | |
| 6 | KPV | 27 | 11 | 4 | 12 | 46 | 47 | −1 | 37 | |
| 7 | Kerho 07 | 27 | 10 | 6 | 11 | 40 | 40 | 0 | 36 | |
| 8 | PK-37 | 27 | 9 | 5 | 13 | 45 | 53 | −8 | 32 | |
| 9 | ORPa (R) | 27 | 7 | 6 | 14 | 36 | 50 | −14 | 27 | Relegation to Kolmonen |
| 10 | Tervarit (R) | 27 | 0 | 6 | 21 | 18 | 83 | −65 | 6 | Relegation to Kolmonen |

Source: palloverkko.palloliitto.fi
Rules for classification: 1) points; 2) goal difference; 3) number of goals scored.
(A) Advance to a further round; (R) Relegated

=== Läntinen (Western) ===
| Pos | Team | Pld | W | D | L | GF | GA | GD | Pts | Qualification or relegation |
|---|---|---|---|---|---|---|---|---|---|---|
| 1 | FC Jazz (A) | 27 | 19 | 4 | 4 | 64 | 23 | +41 | 61 | Qualification to Promotion playoffs |
| 2 | TPV | 27 | 15 | 4 | 8 | 60 | 32 | +28 | 49 | |
| 3 | P-Iirot | 27 | 15 | 4 | 8 | 56 | 36 | +20 | 49 | |
| 4 | FC Hämeenlinna | 27 | 14 | 6 | 7 | 56 | 42 | +14 | 48 | |
| 5 | Närpes Kraft | 27 | 15 | 2 | 10 | 66 | 52 | +14 | 47 | |
| 6 | Masku | 27 | 12 | 6 | 9 | 58 | 47 | +11 | 42 | |
| 7 | ÅIFK | 27 | 10 | 3 | 14 | 59 | 45 | +14 | 33 | |
| 8 | Sporting | 27 | 8 | 4 | 15 | 31 | 55 | −24 | 28 | |
| 9 | MuSa (R) | 27 | 5 | 2 | 20 | 38 | 80 | −42 | 17 | Relegation to Kolmonen |
| 10 | Härmä (R) | 27 | 3 | 3 | 21 | 16 | 92 | −76 | 12 | Relegation to Kolmonen |

Source: palloverkko.palloliitto.fi
Rules for classification: 1) points; 2) goal difference; 3) number of goals scored.
(A) Advance to a further round; (R) Relegated

=== Itäinen (Eastern) ===
| Pos | Team | Pld | W | D | L | GF | GA | GD | Pts | Qualification or relegation |
|---|---|---|---|---|---|---|---|---|---|---|
| 1 | HIFK (A) | 27 | 19 | 5 | 3 | 64 | 22 | +42 | 62 | Qualification to Promotion playoffs |
| 2 | MP | 27 | 19 | 3 | 5 | 71 | 36 | +35 | 60 | |
| 3 | Atlantis FC | 27 | 14 | 6 | 7 | 49 | 42 | +7 | 48 | |
| 4 | FC Lahti Akatemia | 27 | 13 | 4 | 10 | 46 | 35 | +11 | 43 | |
| 5 | PK Keski-Uusimaa | 27 | 13 | 3 | 11 | 58 | 43 | +15 | 42 | |
| 6 | KTP | 27 | 12 | 5 | 10 | 59 | 38 | +21 | 41 | |
| 7 | FC Futura | 27 | 10 | 5 | 12 | 44 | 45 | −1 | 35 | |
| 8 | JäPS (R) | 27 | 6 | 1 | 20 | 28 | 55 | −27 | 19 | Relegation to Kolmonen |
| 9 | Sudet (R) | 27 | 5 | 4 | 18 | 24 | 54 | −30 | 19 | Relegation to Kolmonen |
| 10 | FC POHU (R) | 27 | 6 | 0 | 21 | 20 | 93 | −73 | 18 | Relegation to Kolmonen |

Source: palloverkko.palloliitto.fi
Rules for classification: 1) points; 2) goal difference; 3) number of goals scored.
(A) Advance to a further round; (R) Relegated

=== Promotion play-offs ===
Group winners will play two-legged ties. Team pairs will be drawn and the two winning teams will be promoted to the Ykkönen for season 2014.

Group winners

- Eteläinen (Southern): EIF
- Pohjoinen (Northern): PS Kemi
- Läntinen (Western): FC Jazz
- Itäinen (Eastern): HIFK

==== First leg ====
13 October 2013

| FC Jazz | 2 – 2 | EIF |
|---|---|---|
| Mäkelä 7', 75' | | Konate 16', 31' |

Porin Stadion, Pori
Attendance: 3,024

12 October 2013

| PS Kemi | 0 – 1 | HIFK |
|---|---|---|
| | | J. Halme 19' (pen.) |

Sauvosaari, Kemi
Attendance: 1,255

==== Second leg ====
19 October 2013

| EIF | 0 – 2 | FC Jazz |
|---|---|---|
| Konate (red card) 18' | | Paularinne 26'; Mäkelä 77' |

Ekenäs Centrumplan, Raseborg
Attendance: 2,014

FC Jazz won 4–2 on aggregate.

19 October 2012

| HIFK | 1 – 0 | PS Kemi |
|---|---|---|
| Taulo 89' |

Sonera Stadium, Helsinki

HIFK won 2–0 on aggregate.

=== Eight-placed teams ===
At the end of the season, a comparison is made between the eight-placed teams. The worst eight-placed team will be directly relegated to the Kolmonen.

| Pos | Grp | Team | Pld | W | D | L | GF | GA | GD | Pts | Relegation |
|---|---|---|---|---|---|---|---|---|---|---|---|
| 1 | South | Pallohonka | 27 | 8 | 9 | 10 | 32 | 36 | −4 | 33 | |
| 2 | North | PK-37 | 27 | 9 | 5 | 13 | 45 | 53 | −8 | 32 | |
| 3 | West | Sporting | 27 | 8 | 4 | 15 | 31 | 55 | −24 | 28 | |
| 4 | East | JäPS (R) | 27 | 6 | 1 | 20 | 28 | 55 | −27 | 19 | Relegation to Kolmonen |

Rules for classification: 1) points; 2) goal difference; 3) number of goals scored.
(R) Relegated

== See also ==
- 2013 Veikkausliiga
- 2013 Ykkönen
