= 2002 Kakkonen – Finnish League Division 2 =

Finnish League Division 2
- Season: 2002
- Champions: FC Espoo; Warkaus JK; TPV; OLS
- Promoted: OLS
- Relegated: 8 teams

League tables for teams participating in Kakkonen, the third tier of the Finnish Soccer League system, in 2002.

== League Tables 2002 ==
=== Southern Group, Etelälohko ===
Pos	Team	Pld	W	D	L	GF	GA	GD	Pts
1	FC Espoo, Espoo (O)	22	17	2	3	55	14	+41	53
2	AC Vantaa, Vantaa	22	11	3	8	46	37	+9	36
3	HyPS, Hyvinkää	22	10	6	6	27	25	+2	36
4	KäPa, Helsinki	22	10	3	9	42	32	+10	33
5	IFK Mariehamn, Mariehamn	22	10	2	10	34	37	−3	32
6	Kiffen, Helsinki	22	10	2	10	30	35	−5	32
7	EIF, Ekenäs	22	8	6	8	36	41	−5	30
8	FJK, Forssa	22	9	2	11	44	54	−10	29
9	PK-35, Helsinki	22	7	4	11	30	34	−4	25
10	Atlantis Akatemia, Helsinki	22	7	4	11	40	49	−9	25
11	Ponnistus, Helsinki (R)	22	7	2	13	35	42	−7	23
12	Ponnistajat, Helsinki (R)	22	4	8	10	25	44	−19	20

(O) Play-off winners; (R) Relegated

=== Eastern Group, Itälohko ===
Pos	Team	Pld	W	D	L	GF	GA	GD	Pts
1	Warkaus JK, Varkaus (O)	22	18	3	1	64	14	+50	57
2	MP, Mikkeli	22	13	4	5	53	26	+27	43
3	JJK, Jyväskylä	22	12	5	5	44	24	+20	41
4	Kings, Kuopio	22	10	4	8	34	31	+3	34
5	Jippo, Joensuu	22	8	9	5	55	27	+28	33
6	PK-37, Iisalmi	22	9	4	9	34	31	+3	31
7	TP Lahti, Lahti	22	7	6	9	37	46	−9	27
8	FC Futura, Porvoo	22	7	5	10	41	47	−6	26
9	Pallohait, Laukaa	22	6	2	14	44	66	−22	20
10	SäyRi, Jyväskylä	22	5	4	13	24	55	−31	19
11	MiKi, Mikkeli (R)	22	5	4	13	32	66	−34	19
12	SavU, Mikkeli (R)	22	4	6	12	28	57	−29	18

(O) Play-off winners; (R) Relegated

=== Western Group, Länsilohko ===
Pos	Team	Pld	W	D	L	GF	GA	GD	Pts
1	TPV, Tampere (O)	22	14	5	3	50	22	+28	47
2	SalPa, Salo	22	14	3	5	48	18	+30	45
3	FC Rauma, Rauma	22	11	7	4	42	28	+14	40
4	PS-44, Valkeakoski	22	11	6	5	51	39	+12	39
5	PoPa, Pori	22	9	5	8	30	42	−12	32
6	KaaPo, Kaarina	22	9	4	9	45	42	+3	31
7	MuSa, Pori	22	7	6	9	33	37	−4	27
8	P-Iirot, Rauma	22	9	0	13	39	44	−5	27
9	PIF, Pargas	22	7	5	10	33	38	−5	26
10	KaIK, Kaskinen	22	8	2	12	42	52	−10	26
11	FC Boda, Dragsfjärd (R)	22	4	6	12	25	43	−18	18
12	TPK, Turku (R)	22	4	1	17	28	61	−33	13

(O) Play-off winners; (R) Relegated

=== Northern Group, Pohjoislohko ===
Pos	Team	Pld	W	D	L	GF	GA	GD	Pts
1	OLS, Oulu (O) (P)	22	15	4	3	77	25	+52	49
2	KPV-j, Kokkola	22	16	1	5	60	27	+33	49
3	JBK, Jakobstad	22	12	5	5	57	43	+14	41
4	PS Kemi, Kemi	22	12	3	7	48	26	+22	39
5	FC Kiisto, Vaasa	22	11	4	7	60	38	+22	37
6	Öja-73, Kokkola	22	11	1	10	53	48	+5	34
7	TUS, Kronoby	22	9	6	7	36	33	+3	33
8	VIFK, Vaasa	22	7	3	12	28	39	−11	24
9	KaPa, Kajaani	22	7	2	13	39	52	−13	23
10	KajHa, Kajaani	22	6	5	11	20	42	−22	23
11	Karhu, Kauhajoki (R)	22	5	6	11	29	51	−22	21
12	Sepsi-78, Seinäjoki (R)	22	1	0	21	14	97	−83	3

(R) Relegated

=== Promotion Playoffs ===
First round

- TPV, Tampere – OLS, Oulu 2–3
- OLS, Oulu – TPV, Tampere 3–1
- FC Espoo – WJK, Varkaus 0–2
- WJK, Varkaus – FC Espoo 0–1

Second round

- FC Espoo – HIFK, Helsinki 3–3
- HIFK, Helsinki – FC Espoo, 2–2
- WJK, Varkaus – FC Viikingit, Helsinki 0–3
- Viikingit, Helsinki – WJK, Varkaus 3–2
- TPV, Tampere – Kraft, Närpes 0–2
- Kraft, Närpes – TPV, Tampere 4–0
- OLS, Oulu – FC Korsholm, Korsholm 1–2
- FC Korsholm, Korsholm – OLS, Oulu 0–6

HIFK, FC Viikingit and Närpes Kraft retain their places in the Ykkönen. OLS are promoted to Ykkönen.

== Leading goal scorers ==
Etelälohko

- 21 - Joonas Sarelius, FC Espoo
- 17 - Geoffrey Brown, FJK
- 15 - Kari Vuorinen, FJK

Itälohko

- 20 - Babatunde Wusu, Pallohait
- 17 - Markus Hyttinen, Jippo
- 14 - Iiro kiukas, MiKi
- 14 - Sükrü Uzuner, JJK

Länsilohko

- 16 - Jouni Santanen, KaIK
- 15 - Harri Mikkola, PS-44
- 12 - Pasi Heinänen, KaIK
- 12 - Kari Ketola, FC Rauma

Pohjoislohko

- 33 - Pasi Nevanperä, FC Kiisto
- 17 - Kenneth Björgskog, Öja-73
- 13 - Jari Jäväjä, OLS
- 13 - Esa Savolainen, PS Kemi
- 13 - Fredrik Söderman, JBK

== References and sources ==
- Finnish FA, Suomen Palloliitto
- Kakkonen - Finnish Wikipedia
