= Steven Polack =

English footballer (born 1961)

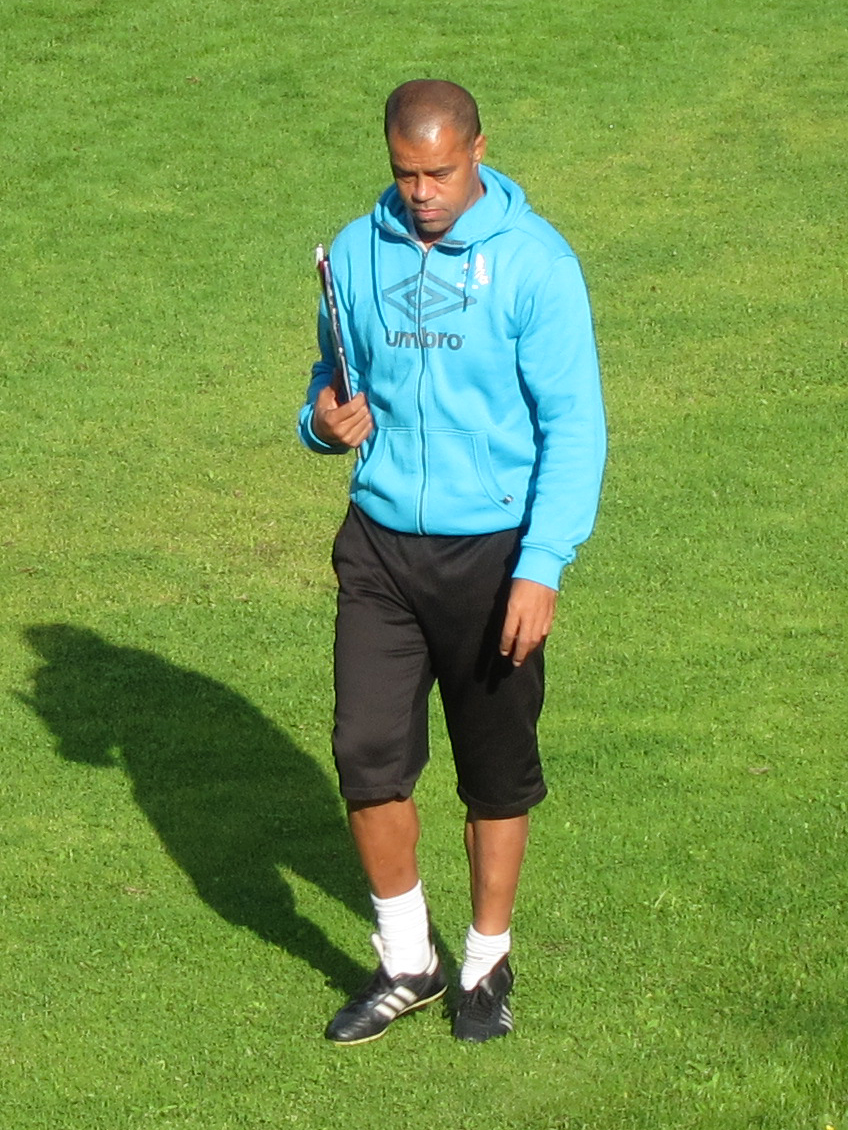

Personal information
- Full name: Steven George Polack
- Date of birth: 10 January 1961 (age 65)
- Place of birth: Birmingham, England
- Positions: Defender; midfielder

Senior career*
Years	Team	Apps	(Gls)
1984–1994	RoPS	265	(31)
1995–1998	Inter Turku	76	(1)

Managerial career
- 1998–1999: Inter Turku (assistant)
- 1999–2000: Inter Turku
- 2000: FC Espoo (youth)
- 2001–2002: FC Boda
- 2003: FC KooTeePee
- 2004: FC Viikingit
- 2005: AC Oulu
- 2006: KPV
- 2006: FC Raahe
- 2007: PK Keski-Uusimaa
- 2007–2009: King Faisal Babes
- 2009–2010: Berekum Chelsea
- 2011: Berekum Chelsea
- 2013–2015: KTP (assistant)
- 2017: Berekum Chelsea
- 2017–2018: Asante Kotoko
- 2019–: Gor Mahia F.C.
- * Club domestic league appearances and goals

Steven George Polack (born 10 January 1961) is an English football manager and former player who has been head coach of clubs in Finland, Ghana, Kenya and South Africa. As a player, he spent most of his career as a defender and midfielder in Finland.

== Early and personal life ==
Polack was born in Birmingham, England to an English mother and a father from the West Indies. He also holds Finnish citizenship.

== Career ==
Polack grew up in Birmingham and attended Kingshurst Comprehensive School from 1972 to 1977. During his school years, he played as a striking partner upfront alongside his lifelong friend and future Aston Villa forward Gary Shaw, who would later go on to win the English First Division Championship and the European Cup. Polack was later converted into a defender upon moving to Finland in 1984, where he enjoyed a highly successful playing career that included winning the Finnish Cup and competing in European club competitions with RoPS Rovaniemi. Following his retirement from playing, he successfully transitioned into a prominent football manager, coaching several clubs in Finland and going on to win major domestic cup trophies in Africa as well as a premier league title with Kenyan giants Gor Mahia.

Polack played 13 seasons and 301 games for RoPS Rovaniemi and FC Inter in the Finnish premier division Veikkausliiga from 1984 to 1994 and 1996–1997. He is one of the most notable players of RoPS.

After his playing career Polack has been coaching several clubs in Finland as well as King Faisal and Berekum Chelsea and SC Kotoko in Ghana, Gor Mahia in Kenya and Marumo Gallants in South Africa.

== Honours ==
=== As a player ===
RoPS

- Finnish Cup: 1986
- 2 Bronze Medals
- Player of the year (5 times)

=== As a manager ===
Berekum Chelsea

- GHALCA Glo G8 Cup: 2011

Asante Kotoko

- MTN Ghanaian FA Cup: 2017–18
- President's Cup: 2017–18

Gor Mahia

- Kenyan Super Cup: 2019
- Kenyan Premier League: 2019–20

Individual

- MTN Coach of the Year: 2017 Ghana
- Coach of the Month Kenya: October 2019, November 2019, February 2020
