= Toivonen =

Toivonen is a Finnish surname.

== Geographical distribution ==
As of 2014, 88.2% of all known bearers of the surname Toivonen were residents of Finland (frequency 1:603), 3.4% of the United States (1:1,038,078), 3.3% of Sweden (1:28,961), 1.8% of Estonia (1:7,183) and 1.4% of Australia (1:162,835).

In Finland, the frequency of the surname was higher than national average (1:603) in the following regions:

1. Southwest Finland (1:255)
2. Tavastia Proper (1:286)
3. Satakunta (1:360)
4. Pirkanmaa (1:390)
5. Päijänne Tavastia (1:408)

== People ==
Notable people with the surname include:

- Aaro Toivonen (born 2005), Finnish footballer
- Armas Toivonen (1899–1973), Finnish marathon runner
- Ester Toivonen (1914–1979), Finnish beauty pageant winner and actress
- Hannu Toivonen (born 1984), Finnish ice hockey player
- Harri Toivonen (born 1960), Finnish racing driver
- Henri Toivonen (1956–1986), Finnish rally driver
- Hugo Toivonen (born 2005), Finnish footballer
- Kalervo Toivonen (1913–2006), Finnish javelin thrower
- Kari-Pekka Toivonen (born 1967), Finnish actor
- Markus Toivonen (born 1979), Finnish musician
- Nestori Toivonen (1865–1927), Finnish sport shooter
- Ola Toivonen (born 1986), Swedish footballer
- Pauli Toivonen (1929–2005), Finnish rally driver
- Tuija Toivonen (born 1958), Finnish long-distance runner
