= Jari Europaeus =

Finnish footballer (born 1962)

Personal information
- Date of birth: 29 December 1962 (age 63)
- Place of birth: Helsinki, Finland
- Position: Defender

Senior career*
Years	Team	Apps	(Gls)
1981–1984	HJK	86	(5)
1984–1986	Gefle	60	(2)
1987–1988	Öster	42	(0)
1989	RoPS	27	(0)
1990–1995	HJK	140	(7)
1996	Atlantis	16	(1)

International career
1983–1991	Finland	56	(0)

Managerial career
- 1996–2000: Atlantis
- 2001–2003: Honka
- 2005–2007: Viikingit
- 2013: HJK (youth)
- 2014: PK-35 Vantaa
- 2019: Espoo (assistant)
- 2020: GrIFK
- * Club domestic league appearances and goals

Jari Europaeus (born 29 December 1962) is a Finnish football manager and a retired player.

During his club career, Europaeus played as a defender for HJK Helsinki, Gefle IF, Östers IF, RoPS and Atlantis FC. He made 56 appearances for the Finland national team.

== Career statistics ==
Appearances and goals by club, season and competition
Club	Season	League			Europe		Total	
Club	Season	Division	Apps	Goals	Apps	Goals	Apps	Goals
HJK Helsinki	1981	Mestaruussarja	16	1	–		16	1
HJK Helsinki	1982	Mestaruussarja	29	1	4 (Note: Appearances in European Cup)	0	33	1
HJK Helsinki	1983	Mestaruussarja	29	2	2 (Note: Appearances in UEFA Cup)	0	31	2
HJK Helsinki	1984	Mestaruussarja	12	1	–		12	1
HJK Helsinki	Total		86	5	6	0	92	5
Gefle	1984	Allsvenskan	10	0	–		10	0
Gefle	1985	Division 2	24	0	–		24	0
Gefle	1986	Division 2	26	2	–		26	2
Gefle	Total		60	2	0	0	60	0
Öster	1987	Allsvenskan	21	0	–		21	0
Öster	1988	Allsvenskan	21	0	4 (Note: Appearances in UEFA Intertoto Cup and UEFA Cup)	0	25	0
Öster	Total		42	0	4	0	46	0
RoPS	1989	Mestaruussarja	27	0	4	0	31	0
HJK Helsinki	1990	Veikkausliiga	18	0	–		18	0
HJK Helsinki	1991	Veikkausliiga	20	3	–		20	3
HJK Helsinki	1992	Veikkausliiga	32	2	–		32	2
HJK Helsinki	1993	Veikkausliiga	27	1	4 (Note: Appearances in UEFA Champions League)	0	31	1
HJK Helsinki	1994	Veikkausliiga	18	0	3 (Note: Appearances in UEFA Cup Winners' Cup)	0	21	0
HJK Helsinki	1995	Veikkausliiga	25	1	4 (Note: Appearances in UEFA Intertoto Cup)	0	29	1
HJK Helsinki	Total		140	7	11	0	151	7
Atlantis	1996	Kakkonen	16	1	–		16	1
Career total			371	15	25	0	396	15
