= Craig Hill (soccer) =

American soccer player

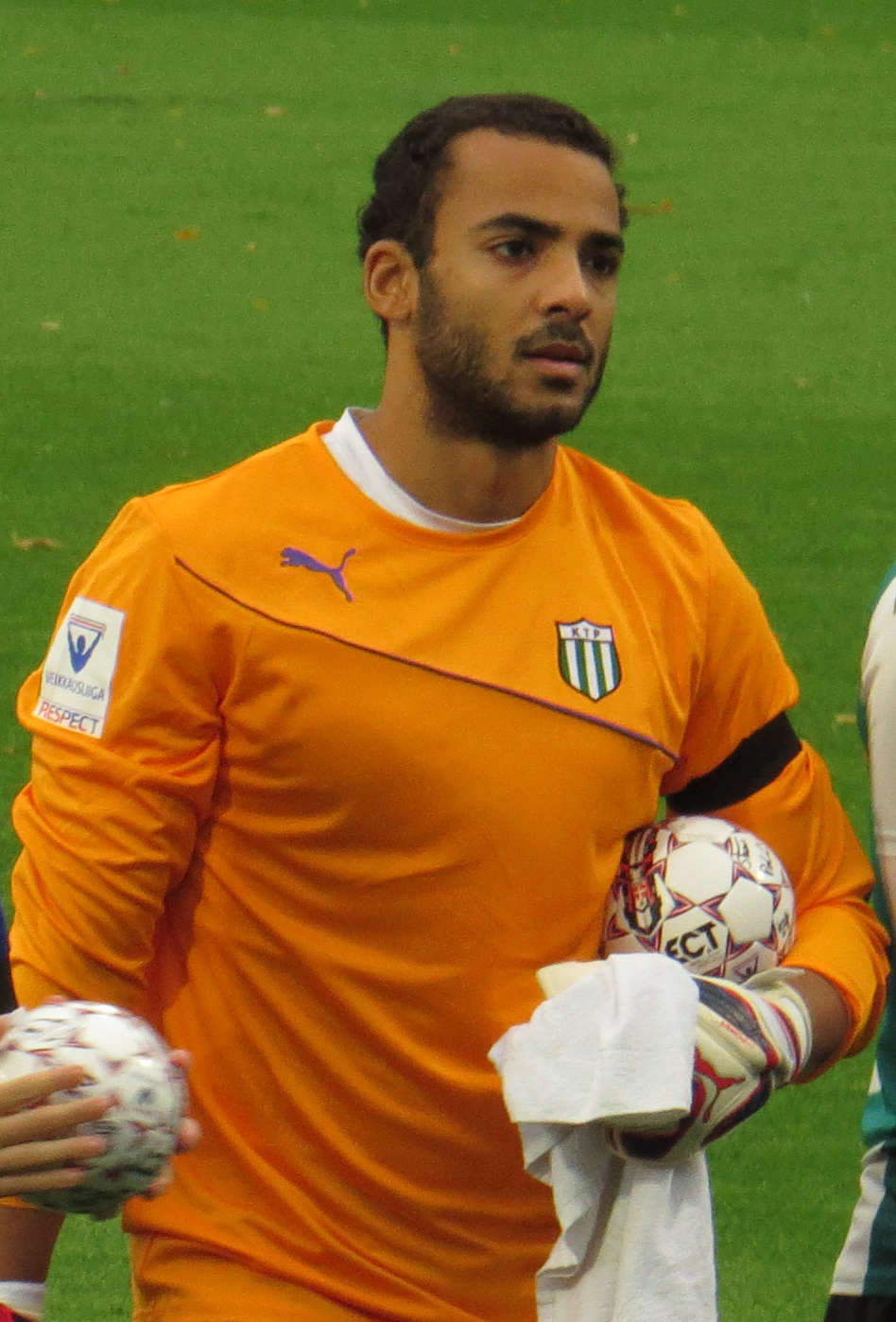
- Hill in 2015

Personal information
- Full name: Craig Hill
- Date of birth: December 27, 1987 (age 38)
- Place of birth: Columbus, Ohio, United States
- Height: 6 ft 2 in (1.88 m)
- Position: Goalkeeper

College career
Years	Team	Apps	(Gls)
2007–2010	SMU Mustangs	76	(0)

Senior career*
Years	Team	Apps	(Gls)
2008	Austin Aztex U23	3	(0)
2011	River Plate Puerto Rico	5	(0)
2012–2013	San Antonio Scorpions	1	(0)
2014–2016	Kultsu	47	(0)
2015	→ KTP (loan)	4	(0)
2016	KuPS	9	(0)
2016	→ KuFu-98 (loan)	1	(0)
2017	Kultsu	4	(0)
2018–2022	PEPO	74	(0)
- * Club domestic league appearances and goals as of March 8, 2023

Craig Hill (born December 27, 1987) is an American soccer player who plays for Finnish club KTP, on loan, from Kultsu FC. He previously played for the San Antonio Scorpions, and for the USL Pro side River Plate Puerto Rico.
