= Yuliya Sotnikova =

Russian athlete

Personal information
- Born: 18 November 1970 (age 55) Volgograd, Soviet Union

Sport
- Sport: Track and field
Medal record
Representing Russia
Olympic Games
Bronze medal – third place	2000 Sydney	4 × 400 m relay
World Championships
Silver medal – second place	1995 Gothenburg	4 x 400 m relay
World Indoor Championships
Gold medal – first place	2001 Lisbon	4 x 400 m relay
European Indoor Championships
Gold medal – first place	2000 Ghent	4 × 400 m relay
Summer Universiade
Gold medal – first place	1995 Fukuoka	4 x 400 m relay

Yuliya Vladimirovna Sotnikova (Russian: Юлия Владимировна Сотникова; born 18 November 1970 in Volgograd) is a Russian world indoor champion and Olympic bronze medallist in the 4 × 400 metres relay. She specializes in the 400 metres and has a personal best time of 50.73s.

She competed for Russia in the 2000 Summer Olympics in the 4 × 400 metres relay where she won the bronze medal with her teammates Svetlana Gontcharenko, Olga Kotlyarova and Irina Privalova.

== International competitions ==
Representing Russia
Year	Competition	Venue	Position	Event	Notes
1995	World Championships	Gothenburg, Sweden	2nd	4 × 400 m relay	
2000	Summer Olympics	Sydney, Australia	3rd	4 × 400 m relay	
2001	World Indoor Championships	Lisbon, Portugal	1st	4 × 400 m relay	

== See also ==
- 4 × 400 metres relay at the Olympics
- 4 × 400 metres relay at the World Championships in Athletics
- List of Olympic medalists in athletics (women)
- List of 2000 Summer Olympics medal winners
- List of World Athletics Championships medalists (women)
- List of European Athletics Indoor Championships medalists (women)
- List of people from Volgograd
