= Ville Taulo =

Finnish footballer (born 1985)

Personal information
- Full name: Ville Olavi Taulo
- Date of birth: 14 August 1985 (age 41)
- Place of birth: Lahti, Finland
- Height: 1.84 m (6 ft 0 in)
- Position: Midfielder

Youth career
- Reipas Lahti

Senior career*
| Years | Team | Apps | (Gls) |
| 2003–2007 | Lahti | 98 | (10) |
| 2008–2009 | HJK | 29 | (0) |
| 2009 | → Klubi 04 | 5 | (0) |
| 2010–2011 | Taranto | 5 | (0) |
| 2010 | → Bellinzona (loan) | 3 | (0) |
| 2012 | → Lahti (loan) | 10 | (0) |
| 2012 | Alta | 5 | (0) |
| 2013–2016 | HIFK | 37 | (3) |
| 2021 | PPJ | 1 | (0) |

International career
| 2005–2008 | Finland | 4 | (0) |
- * Club domestic league appearances and goals

Ville Olavi Taulo (born 14 August 1985) is a Finnish former professional footballer who played as a midfielder.

== Club career ==
He has played for both FC Lahti and HJK in Finnish Veikkausliiga. In January 2010 it was announced that he had signed a three-and-a-half-year deal with Italian club Taranto.

Just after one unsuccessful season – and only five first team appearances – Taulo was loaned to AC Bellinzona. In April 2012 Taulo was loaned to FC Lahti for three months.

== Career statistics ==
=== Club ===
As of 1 September 2024.

Appearances and goals by club, season and competition
| Club | Season | League | | | Cup (Note: Includes Suomen Cup) | | League cup (Note: Includes Finnish League Cup) | | Europe | | Total | |
| Club | Season | Division | Apps | Goals | Apps | Goals | Apps | Goals | Apps | Goals | Apps | Goals |
|---|---|---|---|---|---|---|---|---|---|---|---|---|
| Lahti | 2003 | Veikkausliiga | 21 | 2 | – | | – | | – | | 21 | 2 |
| Lahti | 2004 | Veikkausliiga | 17 | 1 | – | | – | | – | | 17 | 1 |
| Lahti | 2005 | Veikkausliiga | 25 | 4 | – | | – | | – | | 25 | 4 |
| Lahti | 2006 | Veikkausliiga | 13 | 0 | – | | – | | – | | 13 | 0 |
| Lahti | 2007 | Veikkausliiga | 22 | 3 | – | | – | | – | | 22 | 3 |
| Lahti | Total | | 98 | 10 | 0 | 0 | 0 | 0 | 0 | 0 | 98 | 10 |
| HJK | 2008 | Veikkausliiga | 17 | 0 | 2 | 0 | – | | – | | 19 | 0 |
| HJK | 2009 | Veikkausliiga | 12 | 0 | 1 | 0 | – | | 1 (Note: Appearance(s) in UEFA Europa League) | 0 | 14 | 0 |
| HJK | Total | | 29 | 0 | 3 | 0 | 0 | 0 | 1 | 0 | 22 | 0 |
| Klubi 04 | 2009 | Ykkönen | 5 | 0 | – | | – | | – | | 5 | 0 |
| Taranto | 2009–10 | Lega Pro Prima Divisione | 4 | 0 | 0 | 0 | – | | – | | 4 | 0 |
| Taranto | 2010–11 | Lega Pro Prima Divisione | 1 | 0 | 0 | 0 | – | | – | | 1 | 0 |
| Taranto | Total | | 5 | 0 | 0 | 0 | 0 | 0 | 0 | 0 | 5 | 0 |
| Bellinzona (loan) | 2010–11 | Swiss Super League | 3 | 0 | 0 | 0 | – | | – | | 3 | 0 |
| Lahti (loan) | 2012 | Veikkausliiga | 9 | 0 | – | | – | | – | | 9 | 0 |
| Alta | 2012 | 1. divisjon | 5 | 0 | – | | – | | – | | 5 | 0 |
| HIFK | 2013 | Kakkonen | 4 | 2 | – | | – | | – | | 4 | 2 |
| HIFK | 2014 | Ykkönen | 14 | 1 | 1 | 0 | – | | – | | 15 | 1 |
| HIFK | 2015 | Veikkausliiga | 12 | 0 | 1 | 0 | 4 | 0 | – | | 17 | 0 |
| HIFK | 2016 | Veikkausliiga | 7 | 0 | 2 | 0 | 1 | 0 | – | | 10 | 0 |
| HIFK | Total | | 37 | 3 | 4 | 0 | 5 | 0 | 0 | 0 | 46 | 3 |
| HIFK II | 2017 | Kolmonen | 2 | 2 | – | | – | | – | | 2 | 2 |
| PPJ | 2021 | Kolmonen | 2 | 0 | – | | – | | – | | 2 | 0 |
| Career total | | | 195 | 15 | 7 | 0 | 5 | 0 | 1 | 0 | 208 | 15 |

=== International ===
As of 31 May 2012

Finland national team
| Year | Apps | Goals |
|---|---|---|
| 2005 | 1 | 0 |
| 2006 | 2 | 0 |
| 2007 | 0 | 0 |
| 2008 | 1 | 0 |
| 2009 | 0 | 0 |
| 2010 | 0 | 0 |
| 2011 | 0 | 0 |
| 2012 | 0 | 0 |
| Total | 4 | 0 |

== Honours ==
HJK

- Veikkausliiga: 2009
- Finnish Cup: 2008
