= Mohamed Fofana (footballer, born October 1985) =

Guinean football player

Personal information
- Date of birth: 21 October 1985 (age 41)
- Place of birth: Conakry, Guinea
- Height: 1.70 m (5 ft 7 in)
- Position: Midfielder

Team information
- Current team: PK-35
- Number: 8

Youth career
- –2006: Oxford United

Senior career*
| Years | Team | Apps | (Gls) |
| 2006–2008 | MyPa | 44 | (3) |
| 2009–2010 | FC Lahti | 32 | (4) |
| 2011 | FC PoPa | 6 | (0) |
| 2011 | LoPa | 14 | (4) |
| 2012–2013 | Atlantis FC | 45 | (10) |
| 2014 | PK-35 | 10 | (0) |
| 2015–2016 | FC Viikingit | 37 | (8) |

International career
| 2007 | Guinea U-23 | | |
- * Club domestic league appearances and goals

Mohamed Fofana (born 21 October 1985) is a Guinean former footballer who spent most of his career playing in Finland.

In 2007 Fofana was a member of the Guinean Olympic team.
