= Joonas Sarelius =

Finnish footballer (born 1979)

Personal information
- Date of birth: 2 July 1979 (age 47)
- Place of birth: Espoo, Finland
- Height: 1.81 m (5 ft 11 in)
- Position: Striker

Youth career
- FC Honka

Senior career*
Years	Team	Apps	(Gls)
2004–	FC Viikingit		
2003	KSK Tongeren (Bel)		
2002	FC Espoo		
- * Club domestic league appearances and goals

Joonas Sarelius (born 2 July 1979 in Finland) is a Finnish former football striker

Sarelius is currently working with the HJK women's team and in the club's youth sector.
