= Mamadou Konate (footballer) =

Ivorian footballer

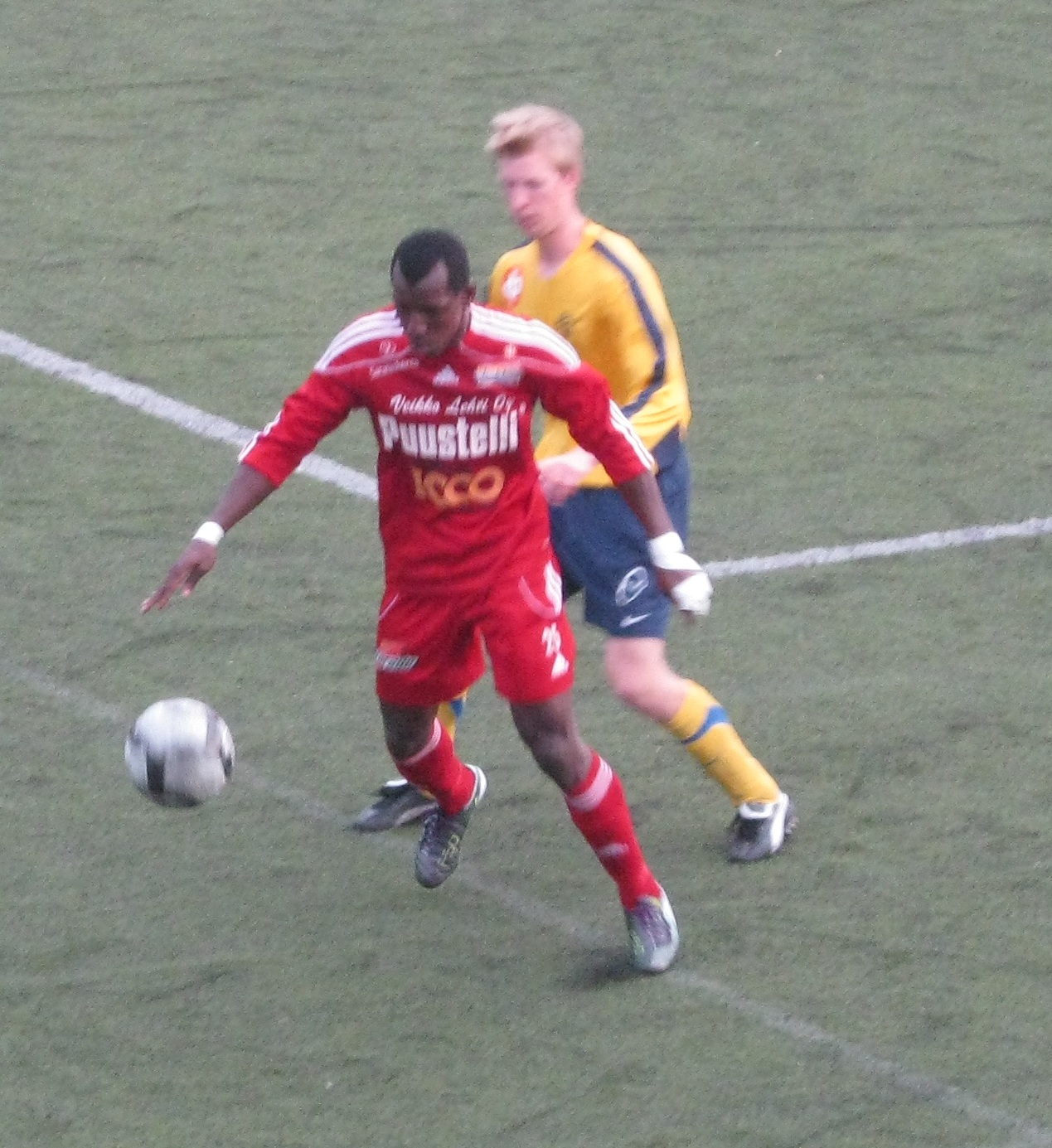
- Mamadou Konate playing for FC Jazz in 2010

Personal information
- Date of birth: 10 March 1985 (age 41)
- Place of birth: Abidjan, Ivory Coast
- Height: 1.76 m (5 ft 9 1/2 in)
- Position: Striker

Team information
- Current team: Ekenäs IF
- Number: 44

Senior career*
Years	Team	Apps	(Gls)
2001–2002	Tricase		
2007–2008	AC Oulu	49	(11)
2009	FC OPA	13	(13)
2009	→ OLS Oulu (loan)	5	(4)
2010–2012	FC Jazz	54	(33)
2012	Sporting Kristina	13	(8)
2013–	Ekenäs IF	25	(16)
- * Club domestic league appearances and goals

Mamadou Konate (born 10 March 1985) is an Ivorian footballer who currently plays for Ekenäs IF in the Finnish second tier Ykkönen. He has previously played for Tricase in the Italian Serie C and for AC Oulu in the Finnish top division Veikkausliiga.
