= Hugo Toivonen =

Finnish footballer (born 2004)

Personal information
- Full name: Hugo Emil Toivonen
- Date of birth: 7 May 2004 (age 22)
- Place of birth: Tuusula, Finland
- Position: Centre forward

Team information
- Current team: PK Keski-Uusimaa

Youth career
- –2021: PK Keski-Uusimaa
- 2022–2023: Palermo

Senior career*
| Years | Team | Apps | (Gls) |
| 2021–2022 | PK Keski-Uusimaa | 33 | (18) |
| 2023 | JäPS | 8 | (1) |
| 2024 | Reus FCR | 17 | (1) |
| 2024 | → UE Rapitenca (loan) | 10 | (1) |
| 2025– | PK Keski-Uusimaa | 0 | (0) |

International career
| 2021 | Finland U18 | 1 | (0) |
- * Club domestic league appearances and goals as of 11 November 2024

Hugo Emil Toivonen (born 7 May 2004) is a Finnish footballer who plays as a centre forward for Ykkönen club PK Keski-Uusimaa.

== Club career ==
Born in Tuusula, Toivonen started playing football in a local club Pallokerho Keski-Uusimaa (PKKU). He made his senior debut with the club's first team in the 2021 season in third-tier Kakkonen.

In August 2022, he joined the youth academy of Palermo FC in Italy. One year later he returned to Finland and signed with Järvenpään Palloseura (JäPS) in second-tier Ykkönen for the rest of the 2023 season.

On 13 January 2024, Toivonen moved to Spain and joined Reus FC Reddis in Tercera Federación.

== Career statistics ==
As of 11 November 2024

Appearances and goals by club, season and competition
| Club | Season | League | | | Cup (Note: Includes Suomen Cup) | | Total | |
| Club | Season | Division | Apps | Goals | Apps | Goals | Apps | Goals |
|---|---|---|---|---|---|---|---|---|
| PKKU | 2021 | Kakkonen | 20 | 8 | 0 | 0 | 20 | 8 |
| PKKU | 2022 | Kakkonen | 13 | 10 | 2 | 1 | 15 | 11 |
| PKKU | Total | | 33 | 18 | 2 | 1 | 35 | 19 |
| JäPS | 2023 | Ykkönen | 8 | 1 | – | | 8 | 1 |
| Reus FC Reddis | 2023–24 | Tercera Federación | 17 | 1 | – | | 17 | 1 |
| UE Rapitenca (loan) | 2024–25 | Lliga Elit | 9 | 1 | – | | 9 | 1 |
| PK Keski-Uusimaa | 2025 | Ykkönen | 0 | 0 | 0 | 0 | 0 | 0 |
| Career total | | | 67 | 21 | 2 | 1 | 69 | 22 |
