= Vyacheslav Malakeev =

Russian footballer and coach (born 1973)

Personal information
- Date of birth: July 26, 1973 (age 53)
- Place of birth: Volgograd, Russian SFSR
- Height: 1.73 m (5 ft 8 in)
- Position: Striker

Senior career*
Years	Team	Apps	(Gls)
1991–1992	FC Zvezda Gorodishche	83	(14)
1993–1995	FC Torpedo Volzhsky	56	(5)
1995–1998	Kemin Pallotoverit-85 (Finland)	?	(44)
1999–2000	MYPA	45	(2)
2000	AC Atlantis (loan)	2	(0)
2001–2011	FC Viikingit	175	(57)
- * Club domestic league appearances and goals

Vyacheslav "Slava" Malakeev (Russian: Вячеслав Малакеев; born July 26, 1973) is a football coach in his former team FC Viikingit He also has coached Finland’s youth national team and has won best coach of the year (lastly in 2022/23 season).

== Career ==
Malakeev played in the Russian Football National League with FC Torpedo Volzhsky.

He also played in Finnish First Division (Veikkausliiga) and (Ykkönen). He holds Finnish citizenship.
