= Petter Meyer =

Finnish footballer (born 1985)

Personal information
- Date of birth: 21 February 1985 (age 41)
- Place of birth: Kauniainen, Finland
- Height: 1.81 m (5 ft 11 in)
- Position: Forward

Team information
- Current team: GrIFK
- Number: 17

Senior career*
Years	Team	Apps	(Gls)
2002–2008	GrIFK	143	(94)
2009–2010	FF Jaro	40	(6)
2011	SJK	27	(23)
2012–	GrIFK	72	(52)
- * Club domestic league appearances and goals as of 14 November 2014

Petter Meyer (born 21 February 1985) is a Finnish footballer currently representing GrIFK of the Kakkonen.

Meyer was an integral part of the Grankulla IFK team that was promoted to the Finnish First Division in 2007. In 2008, he scored twelve goals for his club, third most in the whole league, which earned him a contract with the top flight side FF Jaro. During the 2009 season, he was the best scorer at FF Jaro in the Premier Division. Meyer suffered from injuries that required surgery during the next season. He wasn't able to feature in Jaro as a first team regular because of this.

In December 2010, Meyer announced that he was joining Thai Port F.C. of the Thai Premier League on a trial.

In January 2011, Meyer announced his commitment to SJK for the 2011 season. The main reason for this was the opportunity to combine football with studies.
