= Vitaly Suetov =

Russian footballer

Personal information
- Full name: Vitaly Gennadyevich Suetov
- Date of birth: 28 April 1971 (age 55)
- Place of birth: Volgograd, Russian SFSR
- Height: 1.76 m (5 ft 9 1/2 in)
- Positions: Midfielder; forward

Senior career*
Years	Team	Apps	(Gls)
1989	FC Zvezda Gorodishche	16	(1)
1990	FC Rotor Volgograd	0	(0)
1990–1991	FC Zvezda Gorodishche	41	(4)
1992–1993	FC Rotor-d Volgograd	50	(5)
1993	FC Rubin-TAN Kazan	17	(0)
1994–1997	FC Torpedo Volzhsky	115	(8)
1998	FC Diana Volzhsk	5	(0)
1998–1999	FC Energetik Uren	40	(0)
2001–2002	FC Viikingit	34	(8)
2003–2006	Atlantis FC	63	(3)
2008	HIFK	2	(0)
2008–2009	FC Lootus Kohtla-Järve	5	(2)
2010–2011	Spartak Helsinki		
- * Club domestic league appearances and goals

Vitaly Gennadyevich Suetov (Russian: Виталий Геннадьевич Суетов; born 28 April 1971) is a former Russian professional footballer.

== Career ==
Suetov played in the Russian First Division with FC Rubin-TAN Kazan and FC Torpedo Volzhsky.
