= Sergei Orlov (footballer, born 1974) =

Russian footballer and coach

Personal information
- Full name: Sergei Pavlovich Orlov
- Date of birth: 17 March 1974 (age 52)
- Place of birth: Volgograd, Russian SFSR
- Height: 1.82 m (5 ft 11 1/2 in)
- Position: Defender

Senior career*
Years	Team	Apps	(Gls)
1991	FC Neftemash Volgograd		
1992	FC Avangard Kamyshin	3	(0)
1993	FC Dynamo Mikhaylovka (amateur)		
1994	FC Avangard Kamyshin	20	(1)
1995	FC Dynamo Mikhaylovka	26	(0)
1996–1997	FC Energiya Kamyshin	51	(0)
1997	→ FC Energiya-d Kamyshin (loan)	2	(1)
1998	FC Nosta Novotroitsk	15	(1)
1999	FC Zheleznodorozhnik Volgograd		
2000–2003	FC Lisma-Mordovia Saransk	122	(2)
2004–2006	FC Ryazan-Agrokomplekt Ryazan	24	(1)
2006	FC UOR Volgograd		

Managerial career
- 2008–2009: FC UOR Volgograd
- * Club domestic league appearances and goals

Sergei Pavlovich Orlov (Russian: Сергей Павлович Орлов; born 17 March 1974, in Volgograd) is a Russian football coach and a former player.
