= Riku Paularinne =

Finnish football coach (born 1988)

Personal information
- Date of birth: 8 April 1988 (age 38)
- Place of birth: Espoo, Finland
- Height: 1.80 m (5 ft 11 in)
- Position: Right back

Team information
- Current team: Inter Turku (assistant coach)

Senior career*
Years	Team	Apps	(Gls)
2011–2012	Pallohonka	37	(1)
2012–2014	Jazz	43	(4)

Managerial career
- 2016: Jazz
- 2017: VPS U19
- 2019–2020: Honka II
- 2021–2023: Honka (assistant)
- 2024–: Inter Turku (assistant)
- * Club domestic league appearances and goals as of 23 October 2024

Riku Paularinne (born 8 April 1988) is a Finnish football coach and a former player. He is currently working as an assistant coach of Veikkausliiga club Inter Turku in the coaching staff of Vesa Vasara, having previously worked together in Honka.
