= Alexey Kravtsov =

Russian jurist

- Алексей Кравцов
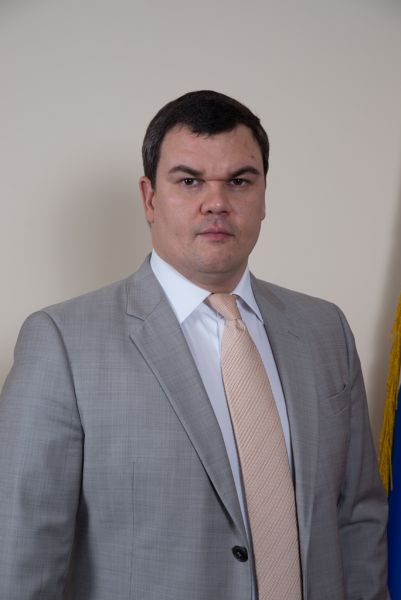

Chief Judge of the Moscow Court of Arbitration
- Incumbent
- Assumed office 2010

member of the Expert Council on property of the State Duma of the Russian Federation
- Incumbent
- Assumed office 2012

member of the Expert Council on legislation of the Moscow City Duma
- Incumbent
- Assumed office 2012

Personal details
- Born: Alexey Vladimirovich Kravtsov; 28 July 1978 (age 47) Volgograd, Russian SFSR, Soviet Union
- Spouse: M. Kravtsova
- Children: Ekaterina

Military service
- Allegiance: Soviet Union
- Branch/service: MVD
- Years of service: 1999 – 2008
- Rank: major

Alexey Vladimirovich Kravtsov (Russian: Алексе́й Влади́мирович Кравцо́в; born 28 July 1978) is a Russian jurist, Chief Judge of the Moscow Court of Arbitration, and a member of the Expert Council of the State Duma of the Russian Federation. He is considered to be one of the founders of the current arbitration court system in Russia.

== Biography ==
Alexey Kravtsov was born in Volgograd on July 28, 1978, to Vladimir Ivanovich Kravtsov and Tatyana Yegorovna Kravtsova.

Up to 1995, he studied at the Volgograd Law School of the Higher Investigative School of the Ministry of Internal Affairs of the Russian Federation.

He graduated from the Higher Investigative School of the Ministry of Internal Affairs of the Russian Federation (now Volgograd Legal Institute of the Ministry of Internal Affairs) in 1999, with a degree in jurisprudence. Four years later, Kravtsov also received a degree in economics from Moscow University of Consumer Cooperatives.

In 1999, Kravtsov began working with law enforcement agencies in Volgograd investigating economic crimes, where he earned the title of "Military Veteran" and the "Combatant" award. In 2002, he was transferred to the Main Economic Crime Investigations Office of the Ministry of Internal Affairs of the Russian Federation in Moscow. He left the Ministry of Internal Affairs in 2008 with the rank of major of the militia.

From 2008 to 2010, Kravtsov was the CEO and co-owner of a mining company that he founded.

In 2010, he founded the Moscow Court of Arbitration, where he still serves as Chief Judge (in 2013).

In 2012, Kravtsov defended his doctoral thesis in jurisprudence. In the same year, he conducted seminars in the Russian School of Management and the State Academy for Training and Advanced Training of Managers and Investment Specialists, and led a legislative initiative to improve the legislation on arbitration courts, which was publicized in the media.

In 2012, Russian arbitration courts joined the Union of Arbitration Courts, and Kravtsov was elected president. He also headed the Union's Non-Governmental Center for Free Legal Aid.

In 2013, Kravtsov began working in the Soloviev Institute of Sales and Purchase management as a lecturer. He is a member of the "Comfort Law Environment" work-group of the Liberal platform of the "United Russia" political party.

== Legislation ==
On Kravtsov's initiative, changes were made in the process of registration of real estate rights in Russia.

In May 2013, Kravtsov initiated the establishment of a working group at the Ministry of Economic Development to improve legislation on Russian arbitration courts.

During development of the Federal Law "On the Contractual System", Kravtsov introduced an initiative to the Ministry of Economic Development on the need to authorize arbitration courts to resolve disputes over public procurement. A bill granting this authority was approved by the Government and State Duma of the Russian Federation and will enter into force on January 1, 2014.

Kravtsov has also been involved in a large number of amendments to the law and various regulatory documents governing the work of arbitration courts in Russia. For example, he was the initiator of development of the methodical recommendations about the dispute resolution on state contracts in courts of arbitration; he made c.50 changes in the arbitration laws for the latest arbitration law reform in Russia.
