= Kultsu FC =

Finnish football club

- Full name: Kultsu FC
- Founded: 1941
- Ground: Joutsenon keskuskenttä Joutseno, Lappeenranta, Finland
- Capacity: 1,000
- Chairman: Mikko Litmanen
- Manager: Craig Hill (soccer)
- League: Kolmonen
Home colours	Away colours

Kultsu FC is a football club from Joutseno, Lappeenranta, Finland. The club was formed in 1941. Kultsu FC play their home matches at Joutsenon keskuskenttä. The team currently plays in the Kolmonen, fourth tier in Finland.

== Current squad ==
Note: Flags indicate national team as defined under FIFA eligibility rules; some limited exceptions apply. Players may hold more than one non-FIFA nationality.

No.	Pos.	Nation	Player
2	DF	(Finland) FIN	Teemu Kiljunen
3	DF	(Finland) FIN	Markus Kyläheiko
4	DF	(Finland) FIN	Mikko Tielinen
6	DF	(Finland) FIN	Olli Hätönen
7	FW	(Finland) FIN	Miko Lötjönen
8	FW	(Nigeria) NGA	Kareem Abubakar
10	DF	(Finland) FIN	Riku Nurkka
12	MF	(Finland) FIN	Simo Kurkisuo
13	DF	(Finland) FIN	Joonas Virolainen
15	FW	(Finland) FIN	Samu Ikonen
16	MF	(Finland) FIN	Panu Peräkylä
17	FW	(Finland) FIN	Aleksi Sainio

No.	Pos.	Nation	Player
18	MF	(Finland) FIN	Tomi Kartunnen
19	MF	(Finland) FIN	Anssi Kivistö
20	MF	(Finland) FIN	Miguel Rodríguez
21	MF	(Finland) FIN	Juha Pelkonen
23	MF	(Finland) FIN	Joona Husu
30	GK	(Finland) FIN	Joona Halla
31	GK	(Finland) FIN	Jani Loijas
32	MF	(Finland) FIN	Ville Vanttaja
33	GK	(Finland) FIN	Saku Pesonen
41	MF	(Finland) FIN	Petteri Rönnkö
66	MF	(Finland) FIN	Antti Heinonen
80	FW	(Finland) FIN	Jari Reponen
