= Aleksey Zhukov =

Russian footballer

Personal information
- Date of birth: 11 January 1965 (age 61)
- Place of birth: Volgograd, Russian SFSR
- Height: 1.78 m (5 ft 10 in)
- Position: Midfielder

Senior career*
Years	Team	Apps	(Gls)
1983–1984	FC Rotor Volgograd	13	(1)
1985	FC Torpedo Volzhskiy	28	(7)
1985	FC SKA Rostov-on-Don	2	(0)
1986	FC Spartak Ordzhonikidze	20	(0)
1986–1987	FC Rotor Volgograd	15	(0)
1987–1991	FC Torpedo Volzhskiy	152	(50)
1992–1996	Kemin Pallotoverit-85	?	(21)
1996	RoPS	5	(1)
1997–1999	Kemin Pallotoverit-85	73	(9)
2000	RoPS	27	(1)
2001–2005	FC Viikingit	111	(19)
2007	SoVo	?	(1)
2008–2010	FC Lootus Kohtla-Järve	40	(10)

Managerial career
- 2009–2010: FC Lootus Kohtla-Järve
- * Club domestic league appearances and goals

Aleksey Zhukov (Russian: Алексей Жуков; born 11 January 1965) is a former Russian professional football coach and a player.

== Club career ==
He played 2 games in the Soviet Top League in 1985 for FC SKA Rostov-on-Don. He then played in Finland for 16 seasons.
