= FC Myllypuro =

Finnish football club

- Full name: FC Myllypuro
- Founded: 2013
- Ground: Myllypuron liikuntapuisto, Helsinki, Finland
- Chairman: Aleksandr Hyppönen
- Manager: Marek Jenas
- League: Kakkonen
Home colours	Away colours

FC Myllypuro is a football club from Myllypuro, Helsinki, Finland. The club was formed in 2013 when it resigned from MaKu into its own organization. FC Myllypuro play their home matches at Myllypuron liikuntapuisto. The team currently plays in the Kakkonen (third tier in Finland).

== Current squad ==
=== First Team ===
Note: Flags indicate national team as defined under FIFA eligibility rules; some limited exceptions apply. Players may hold more than one non-FIFA nationality.

No.	Pos.	Nation	Player
1	GK	(Russia) RUS	Alexander Mishchuk
2	DF	(Finland) FIN	Joni Palomäki
4	DF	(Finland) FIN	Mohammed Mubarik
6	FW	(Rwanda) RWA	Said Ndikumana
7	MF	(Finland) FIN	Sakari Rantala
8	FW	(Estonia) EST	Oliver Konsa
9	FW	(Finland) FIN	Ilmari Hyppönen
10	MF	(Finland) FIN	Evgeni Tolppa
11	MF	(Finland) FIN	Ahmed Abdi
13	MF	(Finland) FIN	Miro Olsoni
14	MF	(Finland) FIN	Emil Sutela
15	MF	(Finland) FIN	Osongo Emongo

No.	Pos.	Nation	Player
17	DF	(Finland) FIN	Atte Elf
18	DF	(Ivory Coast) CIV	Cheikh Toure
20	FW	(Estonia) EST	Sergei Jegorov
21	FW	(Russia) RUS	Nikolay Dubinin
22	MF	(Finland) FIN	Daniel Hiilosvuo
23	MF	(Finland) FIN	Baimaro Daniel Sankoh
24	FW	(Finland) FIN	Majed Rashedi
32	GK	(Finland) FIN	Rasmus Araviita
73	FW	(Sierra Leone) SLE	Sampha Kamara
74	MF	(Estonia) EST	Jüri Artemkin
77	DF	(Georgia (country)) GEO	Levon Lomidze
