= Sporting Kristina =

Finnish football club

- Full name: Sporting Kristina
- Founded: 1994
- Ground: Kristinaplan, Kristinestad, Finland
- Chairman: Jari Rantala
- Manager: Matt Poland
- League: Kolmonen
Home colours	Away colours

Sporting Kristina (abbreviated Sporting) is a football club from Kristinestad, Finland. The club was formed in 1994 and their home ground is Kristinaplan. The men's football first team currently plays in the Kolmonen (Fourth tier in Finland).
