= FC Viikingit =

Finnish football club

- Full name: FC Viikingit
- Nicknames: Viikkarit; Idän punaiset ('Reds of the East')
- Founded: 1965; 61 years ago
- Ground: Vuosaaren urheilukenttä Vuosaari, Helsinki, Finland
- Capacity: 1,500
- Coordinates: 60°13′00″N 25°08′19″E
- Chairman: Jorma Koivukangas
- League: Vitonen
- Website: www.fcviikingit.fi
Home colours	Away colours

FC Viikingit is a Finnish football club based in Vuosaari, East Helsinki, that competes in the Vitonen, the sixth tier of Finnish football. They play their home matches at Vuosaaren urheilukenttä, also called Heteniitty. The club's name and crest refer to Vikings, and they are known for their red colour.

FC Viikingit played the 2007 season in the Finnish premier division (Veikkausliiga), but were relegated to the Ykkönen and competed there until 2014, when they were relegated to Kakkonen. The club's reserve team, FC Viikkarit, were promoted to the Kakkonen for the 2014 season but they had to give it up, because they were not able to play on the same division as the main team.

== History ==
=== Early history (1965–1997) ===
The club was first founded as Vuosaaren Viikingit ('Vuosaari Vikings') in 1965. The new club started at the very bottom of the Finnish football pyramid, spending their first years in the fifth and sixth divisions. For the 1973 season, they were promoted to the IV division and played there for the next ten seasons. In 1983, the team were promoted to the III division, but this visit was cut short, as they were relegated again the following season. They were promoted again for the 1993 season, and this time managed to stay up. They even made a year-long visit to the Kakkonen in 1996, but were relegated after finishing last in their group. In 1997, the footballing section of the club was split into its own organisation with the name FC Viikingit.

=== Climb to the Veikkausliiga (1997–2007) ===
With the new organisation in place, the football club started to enjoy some success in the third division, and were promoted back to the Kakkonen for the 2001 season. The newly promoted team did well in the second division, finishing at first place in their group and winning direct promotion to the Ykkönen for the 2002 season. In their first season in the first division, FC Viikingit finished second to last and had to compete in a play-off against WJK from Varkaus. The Reds won the play-off and remained in the first division. For the 2003 season, Markku Kanerva was appointed the club's manager. He led the club to a successful season, finishing third in a 14-team league, only one point from a promotion play-off spot. In 2004, the club were managed by Steven Polack and finished fourth.

Jari Europaeus was appointed manager of the Reds in 2005. In the following season, he led the club to first place in the Ykkönen, winning promotion to the Veikkausliiga, the highest level of Finnish football. In the first ever premier division match played at Heteniitty, Viikingit beat FC Honka with a 3–2 scoreline and an attendance of over 3,000. The aim for the 2007 Veikkausliiga season was to stay up in the top flight, and with the performances the team gave in the first half of the season, this looked likely. The attendance record, which is still in force, was created in the local derby against HJK Helsinki, which drew 4,255 viewers to Vuosaaren urheilukenttä. In the second half of the season, the team's performances began to drop. However, they managed to finish 13th and avoid direct relegation, but still had to compete in a relegation play-off against RoPS. The first leg in Rovaniemi finished 1–0 in favour of the home side, and therefore the Reds needed a win in the second leg, which was played at Töölön pallokenttä due to heavy snowfall at Heteniitty. However, the match finished 1–1, and Viikingit were relegated to the first division.

=== Return to the Ykkönen (2008–) ===
After relegation from the top flight in the 2007 season, Viikingit have often reached the top three in the Ykkönen, but have fallen short of promotion every time. In 2008, the new manager Toni Korkeakunnas led the team to second place, but KuPS took the promotion play-off with an aggregate scoreline of 2–1. History repeated itself in 2010, when the Reds played JJK Jyväskylä in the play-off, but the Jyväskylä side were marginally better (3–2 on aggregate). From the 2011 season, Viikingit have been managed by long-time Reds player Ilkka Jäntti, finishing fifth and third respectively in the 2011 and 2012 seasons. The club's attendance record in the Ykkönen, 1,670 viewers, was created on 21 July 2011 against local rivals HIFK.

In 2013, the club were in danger of relegation to the Kakkonen, but played well in the closing stage of the season, finishing seventh in the end. This was the club's worst finish since 2002. The season's bright spot was that the reserve team, FC Viikkarit, won their group in the Kolmonen and were promoted to the second division for the 2014 season.

=== Season records 2001–2013 ===
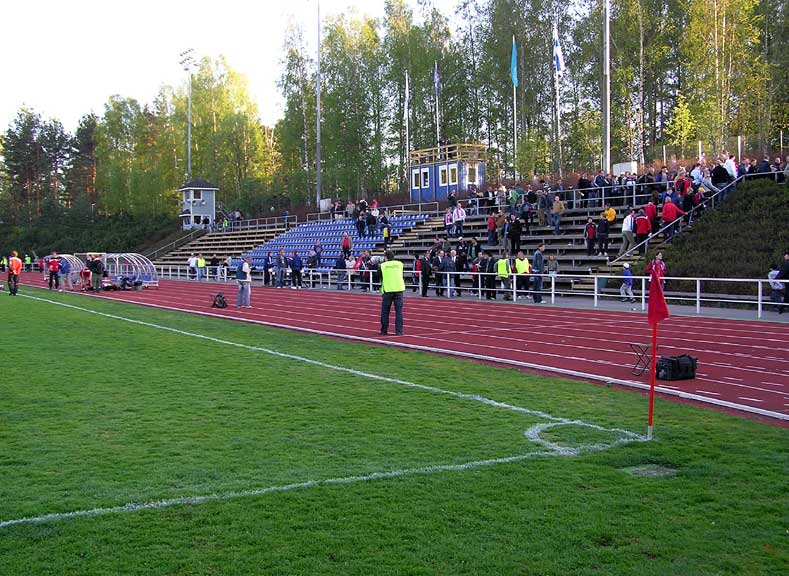
Vuosaaren urheilukenttä

Season	League	Pos	MP	W	D	L	GD	P
2001	Kakkonen (South)	1st	22	15	5	2	56–19	50
2002	Ykkönen (South)	8th	22	3	7	12	31–45	16
2003	Ykkönen	3rd	26	13	8	5	38–28	47
2004	Ykkönen	4th	26	11	9	6	40–33	42
2005	Ykkönen	6th	26	11	4	11	43–34	37
2006	Ykkönen	1st	26	17	5	4	65–25	56
2007	Veikkausliiga	13th	26	5	8	13	25–44	23
2008	Ykkönen	2nd	26	13	7	6	44–26	46
2009	Ykkönen	3rd	26	15	5	6	48–19	50
2010	Ykkönen	2nd	26	15	7	4	49–19	52
2011	Ykkönen	5th	24	13	4	7	50–28	43
2012	Ykkönen	3rd	27	14	3	10	36–36	45
2013	Ykkönen	7th	27	7	8	12	35–39	29

== Ground ==
FC Viikingit play their home matches at Vuosaaren urheilukenttä, often called Heteniitty or Hettari. The ground is located in Central Vuosaari in a former gravel pit, and for this reason is sometimes also called Monttu ('the Pit'). The ground currently has a capacity of 1,500, but has opportunities for expansion. For the 2007 Veikkausliiga season, the ground was expanded to 3,500 seats, but these expansions were removed after the club were relegated.

The reserve side FC Viikkarit play their home matches at Kartanon kenttä in Nordsjön kartano. This is likely to change for the 2014 season, however, as the ground currently does not fulfil the stadium requirements for the Kakkonen. The women's first team, as well as youth teams, also play at Kartanon kenttä.

== Current squad ==
As of 23 August 2014.

Note: Flags indicate national team as defined under FIFA eligibility rules; some limited exceptions apply. Players may hold more than one non-FIFA nationality.

No.	Pos.	Nation	Player
2	DF	FIN	Samuli Ahola
4	DF	FIN	Jani Kaukomaa
5	DF	FIN	Teemu Lipponen
6	MF	FIN	Julius Remes
7	FW	FIN	Aleksi Wikström
8	MF	FIN	Robert Ivanov
9	MF	FIN	Joel Paatelainen
10	MF	FIN	Samir Bouroussi
14	DF	FIN	Jose Lehmusvirta
15	FW	FIN	Oscar Simula
16	DF	FIN	Sebastian Veijola
17	FW	FIN	Einari Kurittu
18	FW	FIN	Olli Hartikainen
19	DF	FIN	Ville Varila

No.	Pos.	Nation	Player
21	DF	FIN	Jesse Mutikainen
22	FW	FIN	Emin Ouni
23	MF	FIN	Markus Maunu
24	MF	FIN	Oskar Nyström
25	DF	FIN	Christoffer Nyberg
24	MF	FIN	Abdi Ayuub
26	MF	GUI	Mohamed Fofana
30	GK	FIN	Valtteri Kuusisto
TBA	DF	FIN	Jere Pulkkinen
TBA	MF	FIN	Janne Arolinna
TBA	MF	FIN	Juuso Mieho
TBA	MF	FIN	Tommi Rasinmäki
TBA	FW	FIN	Rinor Zogejani

=== Coaching staff ===
- Manager:
- Coach: Vyacheslav Malakeev
- Goakeeping coach: Juha-Pekka Pantsu
- Fitness coach: Ari Räsänen
- Physio: Raimo Böök

=== Backroom staff ===
- Chairman: Jorma Koivukangas
- Managing director: Marko Peltola
- Director of football: Joonas Sarelius
- Team director: Pasi Solehmainen

=== Former managers ===
- 2001–2002: (Russia) Alexander Baranov
- 2003: (Finland) Markku Kanerva
- 2004: (England) Steven Polack
- 2005–2007: (Finland) Jari Europaeus
- 2008–2010: (Finland) Toni Korkeakunnas
- 2011–2014: (Finland) Ilkka Jäntti
- 2014–: (Finland) Mika Sandberg

== Organisation and other teams ==
The football club split into two separate organisations in the end of the 2008 season. The first team now operates under its own registered association, FC Viikingit edustus ry, while all other teams continue under FC Viikingit ry.

=== FC Viikkarit ===
The reserve side FC Viikingit/2 was founded in 2007 and played its first seasons in the Kolmonen. In the 2013 season, the team won its group and achieved promotion to the Kakkonen. Upon reaching promotion, the team was renamed FC Viikkarit. The reserve team manager in the 2014 season is Alexei Zhukov.

=== Other teams ===
The women's first team was established in 2001, and it was promoted to the women's first division (Naisten Ykkönen) for the 2014 season. The manager of the women's first team is Akseli Grasutis, who is assisted by coach Kari Simula.

FC Viikingit have a total of twenty youth teams, thirteen for boys and seven for girls. The youth teams have a total of 602 registered players, making Viikingit the seventh largest club in Helsinki in terms of youth football.

In addition, the club runs two amateur teams in lower leagues, FC Viikingit 05 and FC Viikingit/KoMa. As of 2014, both of these teams play in the Kutonen.
