= Pallokerho Keski-Uusimaa =

Finnish football club

PK Keski-Uusimaa
- Full name: Pallokerho Keski-Uusimaa
- Founded: 2005; 21 years ago
- Ground: Kalevan urheilupuisto, Kerava Tuusulan urheilukeskus, Tuusula, Finland
- Chairman: Mikko Bergman
- Manager: Rami Hakanpää
- Coach: Mika Helin
- League: Ykkönen
- 2026: Ykkönen, 5th of 12
Home colours

Pallokerho Keski-Uusimaa (abbreviated PK Keski-Uusimaa or PKKU) is a football club serving the sub-region of Keski-Uusimaa in Finland and is centred on the towns of Järvenpää, Kerava and Tuusula. The club was formed in 2005 and the men's first team currently plays in the newly formed Ykkönen (Second Division). The Chairman of PK Keski-Uusimaa is Mikko Bergman.

== Background ==
The club was founded on 30 November 2005 as a flagship club for the Keski-Uusimaa area with Järvenpään Palloseura, Keravan Pallo-75 and Tuusulan Palloseura as the feeder clubs. Founder club members included Jussi Hautamäki, Mikko Honkanen, Miika Tiira, Lassi Kunttu, Markku Pyykkölä, Raine Nieminen, Tero Valtonen, Pekka Ekegren and Timo Helkamo.

The project had been considered as early as 1988 but the time was not right. However, in the early 2000 decade discussions were reopened by the leading local clubs (JäPS, KP-75 and TuPS) and joint working initiatives came forward such as staff training, the Lionsliigaa (Lions League) for 12- to 15-year-olds and the Keski-Uusimaa Academy.

On 15 December 2005 the clubs gave their final approval to the project and the historic three-club umbrella organisation was established. The PK Keski-Uusimaa club does not compete with the feeder clubs with, but complements them enabling the more talented and motivated high-profile players (B-juniors upwards) to play locally rather than in Helsinki.

PK Keski-Uusimaa has been playing in the Kakkonen (the Second Division), the third tier of Finnish football since 2008.

In August 2022, the club sold its own protégé Hugo Toivonen to Italian Palermo.

== Season to season ==
Season to season of PKKU

Season	Level	Division	Section	Administration	Position	Movements
2006	Tier 4	Kolmonen (Third Division)	Section 2	Helsinki & Uusimaa (SPL Uusimaa)	2nd	
2007	Tier 4	Kolmonen (Third Division)	Section 3	Helsinki & Uusimaa (SPL Uusimaa)	1st	Promoted
2008	Tier 3	Kakkonen (Second Division)	Group A	Finnish FA (Suomen Pallolitto)	8th	
2009	Tier 3	Kakkonen (Second Division)	Group A	Finnish FA (Suomen Pallolitto)	5th	
2010	Tier 3	Kakkonen (Second Division)	Group A	Finnish FA (Suomen Pallolitto)	14th	Relegated
2011	Tier 4	Kolmonen (Third Division)	Section 3	Helsinki & Uusimaa (SPL Uusimaa)	1st	
2012	Tier 4	Kolmonen (Third Division)	Section 2	Helsinki & Uusimaa (SPL Uusimaa)	1st	Promoted
2013	Tier 3	Kakkonen (Second Division)	Eastern Group	Finnish FA (Suomen Pallolitto)	5th	
2014	Tier 3	Kakkonen (Second Division)	Eastern Group	Finnish FA (Suomen Pallolitto)	5th	
2015	Tier 3	Kakkonen (Second Division)	Southern Group	Finnish FA (Suomen Pallolitto)	8th	Relegated
2016	Tier 4	Kolmonen (Third Division)	Group 2	Helsinki & Uusimaa (SPL Uusimaa)	1st	Promoted
2017	Tier 3	Kakkonen (Second Division)	Group A	Finnish FA (Suomen Pallolitto)	7th	
2018	Tier 3	Kakkonen (Second Division)	Group A	Finnish FA (Suomen Pallolitto)	11th	Relegated
2019	Tier 4	Kolmonen (Third Division)	Group 3	Southern District (SPL Etelä)	1st	Promoted
2020	Tier 3	Kakkonen (Second Division)	Group A	Finnish FA (Suomen Pallolitto)	10th	
2021	Tier 3	Kakkonen (Second Division)	Group A	Finnish FA (Suomen Pallolitto)	10th	
2022	Tier 3	Kakkonen (Second Division)	Group A	Finnish FA (Suomen Pallolitto)	6th	
2023	Tier 3	Kakkonen (Second Division)	Group A	Finnish FA (Suomen Pallolitto)	5th	Qualifiers for Ykkönen - Qualified
2024	Tier 3	Ykkönen (First Division)		Finnish FA (Suomen Pallolitto)	8th	
2025	Tier 3	Ykkönen (First Division)		Finnish FA (Suomen Pallolitto)	8th	

- 14 seasons in Ykkönen/Kakkonen
- 6 seasons in Kolmonen

== Current squad ==
As of 28 July 2026

Note: Flags indicate national team as defined under FIFA eligibility rules; some limited exceptions apply. Players may hold more than one non-FIFA nationality.

No.	Pos.	Nation	Player
1	GK	FIN	Robert Barton
3	DF	FIN	Lauri Koivunen
5	DF	FIN	Roni Mäkilä
6	MF	FIN	Valdrin Azemi
7	DF	FIN	Muad Ahmed
9	DF	FIN	Otto Minkkinen
10	FW	FIN	Iiro Kärsämä
11	FW	FIN	Nuutti Nenonen
13	DF	FIN	Jaakko Sivunen
15	FW	FIN	Ajack Deng
16	MF	FIN	Jesse Norss
17	MF	FIN	Samuel Tiainen

No.	Pos.	Nation	Player
19	FW	FIN	Noakim Lokake
21	MF	FIN	Alex Marjo
23	DF	FIN	Roope Kortelainen
24	DF	FIN	Santeri Romppanen
25	FW	FIN	Ossi Niemi
27	FW	FIN	Samuli Alanko
28	MF	FIN	Ariel Barraza
29	FW	FIN	Laith Azhar
31	DF	FIN	Ardiol Musa
56	GK	FIN	Oskari Tikkanen
99	GK	FIN	Valtteri Holopainen

== Club structure ==
PK Keski-Uusimaa runs 2 men's team, 7 boys teams and 3 girls teams in an elite junior section. The club play their home games in Kerava and Tuusula at the following venues:

- Kalevan urheilupuisto, Kerava
- Tuusulan urheilukeskus, Tuusula

== 2010 season ==
PK Keski-Uusimaa Men's Team are competing in Group A (Lohko A) of the Kakkonen administered by the Football Association of Finland (Suomen Palloliitto) . This is the third highest tier in the Finnish football system. In 2009 Pallokerho Keski-Uusimaa finished in fifth position in their Kakkonen section.

== References and sources ==
- Official Website
- Suomen Cup
- Pallokerho Keski-Uusimaa Facebook
