= Ojembe Olatuga =

Nigerian footballer

Mojere ojembe Olatuga
Personal information
- Full name: mojeree ojembe" Olatuga
- Date of birth: January 24, 1988 (age 38)
- Place of birth: Lagos, Nigeria
- Height: 1.82 m (5 ft 11 1/2 in)
- Position: Defender

Team information
- Current team: PK-35
- Number: 6

Youth career
- 2003–2005: Youth Star Sporting Club

Senior career*
Years	Team	Apps	(Gls)
2006–2007	Atlantis FC	28	(1)
2008	SoVo	8	(2)
2008–2009	HIFK	25	(1)
2009	LoPa		
2010	SoVo		
2011–2012	PK-35	24	(1)
2016–	PK-35	5	(0)
- * Club domestic league appearances and goals as of 8 September 2016

Ojembe Olatuga (born 24 January 1988 in Lagos) is a Nigerian footballer.

== Career ==
Olatuga began his career by Youth Star Sporting Club, before later transferring in 2006 to the Finnish second league team Atlantis FC. In January 2008, he along with his teammates Alimamy Jalloh and Michael Ozor left the squad and joined SoVo.

After six months in SoVo, Olatuga again transferred, this time to HIFK. He spent one season with his new club, before signing in January 2009 with Lohjan Pallo.

== Titles ==
- 2006 Youth Champion in Finland with Atlantis FC
