= 2025 Ykkönen =

Ykkönen
- Season: 2025
- Champions: Mikkelin Palloilijat
- Promoted: Mikkelin Palloilijat
- Relegated: EPS; Atlantis FC

The 2025 Ykkönen was the second season of Ykkönen in its current format as the third tier of Finnish football, and was the 54th season of the Ykkönen name overall since its inception in 1973. The season began on 11 April 2025 and ended on 19 October 2025.

== Teams ==
Twelve teams compete in the league. Following the 2024 season, Klubi 04 (champions) were promoted to the Ykkösliiga. They were replaced by MP, who were relegated from the second tier. VIFK and Vaajakoski were relegated to Kakkonen and replaced by the 2024 Kakkonen champions, FC Inter Turku II and Tampere United.

=== Stadiums and locations ===
Location of teams in 2025 Ykkönen

The following teams are participating in the 2025 Ykkönen season.

| Club | Location | Stadium | Capacity | Manager |
|---|---|---|---|---|
| Atlantis FC | Helsinki | Töölön Pallokenttä | 4,000 | (Nigeria) Abdul Aziz Moshood |
| EPS | Espoo | Espoonlahden urheilupuisto | 1,200 | (Finland) Tuomas Silvennoinen |
| FC Inter Turku II | Turku | Veritas Stadion | 9,372 | (Finland) Vesa Vasara |
| FC Jazz | Pori | UK-Tekonurmi | | (Finland) Ville Ulanen |
| JJK Jyväskylä | Jyväskylä | Harjun stadion | 5,000 | (Scotland) Brian Page |
| KPV | Kokkola | Kokkolan keskuskenttä | 3,000 | (Portugal) Alexandre Ferreira Ribeiro |
| KuPS II | Kuopio | Väre Areena | 5,000 | (Finland) Jarkko Wiss |
| MP | Mikkeli | Mikkelin Urheilupuisto | 7,000 | (Senegal) Issa Thiaw |
| AC Oulu/OLS | Oulu | Castrén | 2,500 | (Finland) Mikko Mannila |
| PK Keski-Uusimaa | Tuusula, Kerava, Järvenpää | Kalevan Urheilupuisto, Kerava | 2,500 | (Finland) Rami Hakanpää |
| RoPS | Rovaniemi | Rovaniemen keskuskenttä | 2,803 | (Finland) Jari Alamäki |
| Tampere United | Tampere | Tammelan Stadion | 8,017 | (Finland) Topi Priha |

== Regular season ==
=== League table ===
| Pos | Team | Pld | W | D | L | GF | GA | GD | Pts | Qualification |
|---|---|---|---|---|---|---|---|---|---|---|
| 1 | MP | 22 | 11 | 6 | 5 | 41 | 25 | +16 | 39 | Qualification for the Promotion Round |
| 2 | OLS | 22 | 8 | 10 | 4 | 47 | 32 | +15 | 34 | Qualification for the Promotion Round |
| 3 | KPV | 22 | 10 | 4 | 8 | 36 | 35 | +1 | 34 | Qualification for the Promotion Round |
| 4 | KuPS Akatemia | 22 | 10 | 3 | 9 | 39 | 41 | −2 | 33 | Qualification for the Promotion Round |
| 5 | JJK Jyväskylä | 22 | 9 | 4 | 9 | 31 | 28 | +3 | 31 | Qualification for the Promotion Round |
| 6 | Tampere United | 22 | 9 | 4 | 9 | 34 | 33 | +1 | 31 | Qualification for the Promotion Round |
| 7 | FC Jazz | 22 | 10 | 3 | 9 | 41 | 34 | +7 | 30 | Qualification for the Relegation Round |
| 8 | PK Keski-Uusimaa | 22 | 8 | 6 | 8 | 41 | 44 | −3 | 30 | Qualification for the Relegation Round |
| 9 | Inter Turku II | 22 | 8 | 5 | 9 | 51 | 41 | +10 | 29 | Qualification for the Relegation Round |
| 10 | RoPS | 22 | 7 | 4 | 11 | 30 | 46 | −16 | 25 | Qualification for the Relegation Round |
| 11 | EPS | 22 | 7 | 3 | 12 | 25 | 45 | −20 | 24 | Qualification for the Relegation Round |
| 12 | Atlantis | 22 | 7 | 4 | 11 | 31 | 43 | −12 | 23 | Qualification for the Relegation Round |

Source: Soccerway
Rules for classification: 1) Points; 2) Goal difference; 3) Goals scored; 4) Head-to-head points; 5) Head-to-head goal difference; 6) Head-to-head away goals scored; 7) Play-off
(Note: Play-off is only played if need to decide champion, teams for relegation or UEFA competition and will be played on a neutral ground).

Notes:

- Atlantis FC has been deducted 2 points.
- FC Jazz has been deducted 3 points.

=== Results ===
| Home \ Away | ATL | EPS | INT | JAZ | JJK | KPV | KPS | MIP | OLS | PKK | RPS | TAM |
|---|---|---|---|---|---|---|---|---|---|---|---|---|
| Atlantis | — | 0–2 | 1–0 | 0–1 | 1–0 | 3–5 | 2–4 | 0–2 | 3–2 | 2–3 | 3–3 | 2–0 |
| EPS | 1–0 | — | 3–5 | 0–1 | 2–1 | 1–0 | 0–3 | 3–1 | 1–4 | 4–3 | 2–1 | 1–1 |
| Inter Turku II | 1–3 | 2–1 | — | 1–2 | 0–1 | 7–1 | 6–1 | 4–0 | 1–1 | 2–2 | 2–0 | 2–3 |
| FC Jazz | 0–3 | 7–0 | 2–2 | — | 0–1 | 1–1 | 2–1 | 1–3 | 2–0 | 4–2 | 3–1 | 3–2 |
| JJK Jyväskylä | 1–1 | 1–0 | 4–1 | 3–1 | — | 3–0 | 2–1 | 0–0 | 1–1 | 2–3 | 5–0 | 1–4 |
| KPV | 3–0 | 2–1 | 2–1 | 3–1 | 3–0 | — | 1–0 | 1–4 | 2–2 | 1–0 | 5–0 | 1–0 |
| KuPS Akatemia | 5–2 | 1–1 | 3–1 | 2–1 | 2–1 | 1–0 | — | 1–6 | 1–3 | 0–1 | 1–1 | 5–0 |
| MP | 3–1 | 1–1 | 2–2 | 0–0 | 2–0 | 2–1 | 3–0 | — | 0–0 | 3–1 | 0–1 | 2–1 |
| OLS | 6–1 | 4–0 | 2–2 | 2–1 | 2–2 | 1–1 | 5–0 | 2–2 | — | 3–1 | 2–1 | 1–3 |
| PK Keski-Uusimaa | 0–0 | 4–1 | 3–5 | 0–5 | 2–0 | 3–1 | 2–2 | 3–2 | 1–1 | — | 0–4 | 0–0 |
| RoPS | 1–1 | 2–0 | 3–1 | 3–1 | 1–2 | 2–2 | 0–3 | 2–1 | 4–1 | 0–5 | — | 0–2 |
| Tampere United | 0–2 | 1–0 | 1–3 | 4–2 | 1–0 | 2–0 | 1–2 | 0–2 | 2–2 | 2–2 | 4–0 | — |

Source: Soccerway
Legend: Blue = home team win; Yellow = draw; Red = away team win.

== Promotion Round ==
The top six from the regular season enter the Promotion Round and play each other for the third time. The winner qualifies directly for promotion to Ykkösliiga, whilst the runners-up enter a two-legged playoff against the second to last team in the 2024 Ykkösliiga for promotion.

=== League table ===
| Pos | Team | Pld | W | D | L | GF | GA | GD | Pts | Promotion or qualification |
|---|---|---|---|---|---|---|---|---|---|---|
| 1 | MP (C, P) | 27 | 14 | 8 | 5 | 55 | 31 | +24 | 50 | Promotion to the Ykkösliiga |
| 2 | OLS | 27 | 12 | 11 | 4 | 61 | 36 | +25 | 47 | Qualification for the Ykkösliiga play-off |
| 3 | KuPS Akatemia | 27 | 13 | 4 | 10 | 50 | 49 | +1 | 43 | |
| 4 | KPV | 27 | 12 | 4 | 11 | 44 | 44 | 0 | 40 | |
| 5 | JJK Jyväskylä | 27 | 10 | 4 | 13 | 38 | 42 | −4 | 34 | |
| 6 | Tampere United | 27 | 9 | 4 | 14 | 35 | 47 | −12 | 31 | |

Source: Soccerway
Rules for classification: 1) Points; 2) Goal difference; 3) Goals scored; 4) Head-to-head points; 5) Head-to-head goal difference; 6) Head-to-head away goals scored; 7) Play-off
(Note: Play-off is only played if need to decide champion, teams for relegation or UEFA competition and will be played on a neutral ground).
(C) Champions; (P) Promoted

=== Results ===
| Home \ Away | MIP | OLS | KPS | KPV | JJK | TAM |
|---|---|---|---|---|---|---|
| MP | — | 2–2 | — | — | 5–1 | 3–0 |
| OLS | — | — | 4–2 | 3–0 | 3–0 | — |
| KuPS Akatemia | 2–2 | — | — | — | — | 2–0 |
| KPV | 1–2 | — | 1–3 | — | 4–0 | — |
| JJK Jyväskylä | — | — | 1–2 | — | — | 5–0 |
| Tampere United | — | 0–2 | — | 1–2 | — | — |

Source: Soccerway
Legend: Blue = home team win; Yellow = draw; Red = away team win.

== Relegation Round ==
The bottom six from the regular season enter the Relegation Round and play each other for the third time. The bottom two sides are relegated to the Kakkonen.

=== League table ===
| Pos | Team | Pld | W | D | L | GF | GA | GD | Pts | Relegation |
|---|---|---|---|---|---|---|---|---|---|---|
| 1 | PK Keski-Uusimaa | 27 | 11 | 7 | 9 | 48 | 51 | −3 | 40 | |
| 2 | RoPS | 27 | 11 | 5 | 11 | 45 | 52 | −7 | 38 | |
| 3 | Inter Turku II | 27 | 10 | 5 | 12 | 61 | 54 | +7 | 35 | |
| 4 | FC Jazz | 27 | 11 | 3 | 13 | 50 | 46 | +4 | 33 | |
| 5 | EPS (R) | 27 | 10 | 3 | 14 | 35 | 49 | −14 | 33 | Relegation to the Kakkonen |
| 6 | Atlantis (R) | 27 | 8 | 4 | 15 | 42 | 63 | −21 | 26 | Relegation to the Kakkonen |

Source: Soccerway
Rules for classification: 1) Points; 2) Goal difference; 3) Goals scored; 4) Head-to-head points; 5) Head-to-head goal difference; 6) Head-to-head away goals scored; 7) Play-off
(Note: Play-off is only played if need to decide champion, teams for relegation or UEFA competition and will be played on a neutral ground).
(R) Relegated

Notes:

- Atlantis FC has been deducted 2 points.
- FC Jazz has been deducted 3 points.

=== Results ===
| Home \ Away | PKK | RPS | INT | JAZ | EPS | ATL |
|---|---|---|---|---|---|---|
| PK Keski-Uusimaa | — | 2–2 | 2–1 | — | 1–0 | — |
| RoPS | — | — | — | 2–1 | — | 4–2 |
| Inter Turku II | — | 1–6 | — | 2–1 | 1–3 | — |
| FC Jazz | 1–2 | — | — | — | 0–2 | 6–4 |
| EPS | — | 0–1 | — | — | — | 5–1 |
| Atlantis | 3–0 | — | 1–5 | — | — | — |

Source: Soccerway
Legend: Blue = home team win; Yellow = draw; Red = away team win.

== Awards ==
=== Annual awards ===
| Award | Winner | Club |
|---|---|---|
| Player of the Year | (Ghana) Torfiq Ali-Abubakar | Mikkelin Palloilijat |
| Goalkeeper of the Year | (Finland) Jonne Uronen | Mikkelin Palloilijat |
| Defender of the Year | (Finland) Sampo Ala-Iso | AC Oulu/OLS |
| Midfielder of the Year | (Denmark) Mustapha Coker | Mikkelin Palloilijat |
| Striker of the Year | (Ghana) Torfiq Ali-Abubakar | Mikkelin Palloilijat |
