= Miikka =

Miikka is a Finnish name of the following people:

- Miikka Anttila (born 1972), Finnish rally co-driver
- Miikka Ilo (born 1982), Finnish footballer
- Miikka Kiprusoff (born 1976), Finnish ice hockey player
- Miikka Männikkö (born 1979), Finnish ice hockey player
- Miikka Mujunen (born 1996), Finnish footballer
- Miikka Multaharju (born 1977), Finnish footballer
- Miikka Muurinen (born 2007), Finnish basketball player
- Miikka Oinonen (born 1983), Finnish footballer
- Miikka Pitkänen (born 1996), Finnish ice hockey player
- Miikka Salomäki (born 1993), Finnish ice hockey player
- Miikka Toivola (1949–2017), Finnish footballer
- Miikka Tuomainen (born 1986), Finnish ice hockey player
- Miikka Turunen (born 1979), Finnish footballer
