= 2008 Ykkönen =

Finnish League Division 1
- Season: 2008

League tables for teams participating in Ykkönen, the second tier of the Finnish Soccer League system, in 2008.

== League table ==
Pos	Team	Pld	W	D	L	GF	GA	GD	Pts	Promotion or relegation
1	JJK (C, P)	26	15	6	5	44	20	+24	51	Promotion to Veikkausliiga
2	FC Viikingit	26	13	7	6	44	26	+18	46	Qualification to Promotion playoffs
3	FC Hämeenlinna	26	13	6	7	31	24	+7	45	
4	AC Oulu	26	10	11	5	40	26	+14	41	
5	Jippo	26	11	6	9	27	30	−3	39	
6	KPV	26	10	8	8	37	36	+1	38	
7	PK-35	26	9	9	8	37	34	+3	36	
8	PS Kemi	26	9	8	9	34	35	−1	35	
9	TPV	26	9	7	10	28	29	−1	34	
10	TP-47	26	6	12	8	21	24	−3	30	
11	Atlantis FC	26	6	11	9	27	33	−6	29	
12	VIFK (R)	26	5	12	9	33	36	−3	27	Relegation to Kakkonen
13	GrIFK (R)	26	7	3	16	36	54	−18	24	Relegation to Kakkonen
14	KäPa (R)	26	3	6	17	15	47	−32	15	Relegation to Kakkonen

(C) Champions; (P) Promoted; (R) Relegated

=== Promotion play-offs ===
KuPS as 13th placed team in the 2008 Veikkausliiga and FC Viikingit as runners-up of the 2008 Ykkönen competed in a two-legged play-off for a place in the Veikkausliiga. KuPS won the play-offs by 2-1 on aggregate and remained in Veikkausliiga.

Viikingit Helsinki - KuPS Kuopio 1-2
KuPS Kuopio - Viikingit Helsinki 0-0

== Sources ==
- Finnish FA (Suomen Palloliitto)
