= Ville Väisänen =

Finnish footballer (born 1977)

Personal information
- Full name: Ville Tapio Väisänen
- Date of birth: 19 April 1977 (age 49)
- Place of birth: Oulu, Finland
- Height: 6 ft 3 in (1.91 m)
- Positions: Defender; midfielder

Senior career*
Years	Team	Apps	(Gls)
1996	OTP	18	(4)
1997	Jazz	10	(2)
1997–2000	De Graafschap	30	(2)
1999	→ Lahti (loan)	7	(0)
1999	→ TPV (loan)	10	(1)
2000–2001	Ethnikos Asteras	2	(0)
2001–2002	Haka	45	(8)
2003	Bryne	21	(1)
2004	Ljungskile	16	(3)
2005–2006	Jaro	35	(2)
2006–2007	Darlington	5	(0)
2007	OPS	18	(2)
2008	OPA	4	(1)
2008–2009	Spennymoor Town	14	(2)
2009–2010	OPA	25	(1)

International career
2001–2003	Finland	5	(1)

Managerial career
- 2007: Hercules
- 2008: Marton
- 2009: Tervarit U17
- 2010: OPA
- 2011–2012: ONS
- * Club domestic league appearances and goals

Ville Väisänen (born 19 April 1977) is a Finnish former footballer who last played as defender in Finnish second division team FC OPA. Väisänen has also tried his hands at managing - his latest spell being with Oulu Nice Soccer for seasons 2011 and 2012.

== Career ==
Väisänen started his career in 1996 in his home country with his hometown team OTP which played in Finland third tier Kakkonen scoring four goals in the first few games. Soon after he moved to south to city of Pori to play for league side FC Jazz, eventually making his debut the following year. He moved to the Netherlands, where he played for two seasons for De Graafschap in Doetinchem before he returned to Finland, with first TPV then FC Lahti.

In 1999, he moved to Norway for one season, before his career took him to Greece, with Ethnikos Asteras. In 2001, he again returned to Finland, spending two seasons, then moved across Scandinavia, with Norwegian-side Bryne FK then Swedish Ljungskile SK. In 2005, Väisänen moved to Finland to play two seasons with FF Jaro. In August 2006, he moved to England to play with Darlington, after being signed by manager David Hodgson. He played five times but suffered a knee injury, and when Hodgson was replaced by new manager Dave Penney, Väisänen was released in December. Väisänen then moved back to Finland to play for his hometown team Oulun Palloseura playing in Kakkonen. He played as a midfielder and was a captain of the team. He left the team at the end of season to continue his studies in England and to find a new team.

Väisänen eventually returned to Oulu to play for another hometown team, FC OPA for five games. His brother Kalle Väisänen also played for the team. After a short spell at OPA, Ville Väisänen head back to England to finish his studies and played for a Northern League Division One side Spennymoor Town for the 2008–09 season.

He also earned five caps for the Finland national side. He managed JS Hercules for a period of time in 2007. In October 2008, he became a gym instructor at Headlam Hall hotel in Headlam, County Durham, England. While studying he also managed junior side FC Marton in Middlesbrough.

Väisänen has signed for FC OPA for the season 2009. He is did assistant managing for Tervarit U17 team in Oulu for the season 2009. In the season 2010 Väisänen took a bigger role in FC OPA. He signed a player-manager contract which kept him at FC OPA for another year.

== Career statistics ==
=== Club ===
Appearances and goals by club, season and competition
Club	Season	Division	League		Europe		Total	
Club	Season	Division	Apps	Goals	Apps	Goals	Apps	Goals
OTP	1996	Kakkonen	18	4	–		18	4
Jazz	1997	Veikkausliiga	10	2	–		10	2
De Graafschap	1997–98	Eredivisie	10	0	–		10	0
De Graafschap	1998–99	Eredivisie	4	1	–		4	1
De Graafschap	1999–00	Eredivisie	16	1	–		16	1
De Graafschap	Total		30	2	0	0	30	2
TPV (loan)	1999	Veikkausliiga	10	1	–		10	1
Lahti (loan)	1999	Veikkausliiga	7	0	–		7	0
Ethnikos Asteras	2000–01	Super League Greece	5	2	–		5	2
Haka	2001	Veikkausliiga	25	4	6 (Note: Appearances in UEFA Champions League and UEFA Cup)	1	31	5
Haka	2002	Veikkausliiga	20	4	2 (Note: Appearances in UEFA Intertoto Cup)	0	22	4
Haka	Total		45	8	8	1	53	9
Bryne	2003	Tippeligaen	21	0	–		21	0
Ljungskile	2004	Swedish Division 2	16	3	–		16	3
Jaro	2005	Veikkausliiga	21	0	–		21	0
Jaro	2006	Veikkausliiga	14	2	–		14	2
Jaro	Total		35	2	0	0	35	2
Darlington	2006–07	League Two	5	0	–		5	0
OPS	2007	Kakkonen	18	2	–		18	2
FC OPA	2008	Kakkonen	4	1	–		4	1
Spennymoor Town	2008–09	Northern League Division One	14	2	–		14	2
FC OPA	2009	Kakkonen	25	1	–		25	1
Career total			263	30	8	1	271	31

=== International ===
Appearances and goals by national team and year
National team	Year	Apps	Goals
Finland
Finland	2001	3	1
Finland	2002	1	0
Finland	2003	1	0
Total		5	1

=== International goals ===
Scores and results list Finland's goal tally first, score column indicates score after each Väisänen goal.

List of international goals scored by Ville Väisänen
No.	Date	Venue	Opponent	Score	Result	Competition
1	20 February 2001	Sultan Qaboos Sports Complex, Muscat, Oman	Oman	1–0	2–0	Friendly
