= Marcello Matrone =

Brazilian footballer

Personal information
- Full name: Marcello Ribeiro
- Date of birth: 7 November 1981 (age 45)
- Place of birth: Goias, Brazil
- Positions: Striker; midfielder; winger

Senior career*
Years	Team	Apps	(Gls)
1995–2001	Rio verde		
2001	1.FC Wernigerode	12	(9)
2002	Atlantis FC		
2003–2004	FC Hämeenlinna		
2004–2005	FC Hämeenlinna		
2006–	PP-70		
2007–2008	Association Salé		
- Hassania Agadir
- * Club domestic league appearances and goals

Marcello Ribeiro (born 7 November 1981), known as Marcello Matrone, is a footballer.

He previously played for Finnish club FC Hämeenlinna.
