= Kalle Multanen =

Finnish footballer (born 1989)

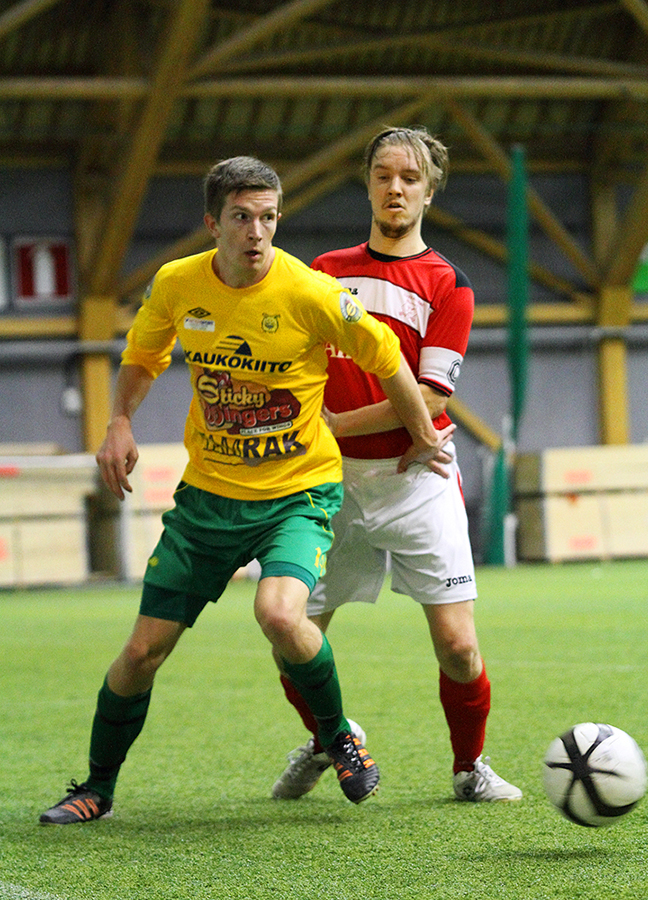
- Multanen with Ilves in a pre-season friendly match in January 2013

Personal information
- Date of birth: 7 April 1989 (age 37)
- Place of birth: Viiala, Finland
- Height: 1.85 m (6 ft 1 in)
- Position: Forward

Team information
- Current team: Haka
- Number: 17

Youth career
- Haka

Senior career*
Years	Team	Apps	(Gls)
2008–2011	Haka	28	(4)
2011	→ PoPa (loan)	14	(1)
2011	→ LoPa (loan)	5	(12)
2012–2013	Ilves	52	(38)
2014–2015	Haka	54	(49)
2016	Lahti	25	(5)
2016	→ Lahti Akatemia	1	(0)
2017	Haka	24	(14)
2018	KPV	27	(11)
2019	KTP	18	(11)
2019–2020	Giorgione	20	(5)
2020–2021	Igea 1946	6	(2)
2021–2024	VPS	77	(26)
2025–	Haka	26	(5)
- * Club domestic league appearances and goals as of 19 November 2025

Kalle Multanen (born 7 April 1989) is a Finnish professional footballer who plays for Haka in Veikkausliiga. Multanen is an all-time leading goalscorer of the Finnish second-tier.

== Career ==
=== KTP ===
On 2 January 2019, Multanen signed with KTP on a one-year deal with an option to extend it with further one year.

=== Giorgione ===
Italian club, A.S.D. Giorgione Calcio 2000, announced on 14 August 2019, that 30-year old Multanen had joined the club.

=== Haka ===
On 4 February 2025, Multanen returned to his former club FC Haka on a deal for the 2025 Veikkausliiga season.

== Career statistics ==
As of 1 June 2025

Appearances and goals by club, season and competition
Club	Season	League			Cup (Note: Includes Suomen Cup)		League cup (Note: Includes Finnish League Cup)		Europe		Total	
Club	Season	Division	Apps	Goals	Apps	Goals	Apps	Goals	Apps	Goals	Apps	Goals
Viialan Peli-Veikot	2006	Kolmonen										
Viialan Peli-Veikot	2007	Nelonen										
Viialan Peli-Veikot	2008	Nelonen										
Viialan Peli-Veikot	Total		28	9	0	0	0	0	0	0	28	9
Haka	2008	Veikkausliiga	1	0	–		–		0	0	1	0
Haka	2009	Veikkausliiga	5	2	1	0	2	0	–		8	2
Haka	2010	Veikkausliiga	19	2	1	1	1	0	–		21	3
Haka	2011	Veikkausliiga	3	0	1	0	1	0	–		5	0
Haka	Total		28	4	3	1	4	0	0	0	35	5
SalPa (loan)	2008	Kakkonen	4	6	–		–		–		4	6
VaKP (loan)	2009	Kolmonen	20	20	–		–		–		20	20
TPV (loan)	2010	Ykkönen	1	0	–		–		–		1	0
PoPa (loan)	2011	Ykkönen	14	1	–		–		–		14	1
LoPa (loan)	2011	Kakkonen	5	12	–		–		–		5	12
Ilves	2012	Kakkonen	26	26	–		–		–		26	26
Ilves	2013	Ykkönen	26	12	1	0	–		–		27	12
Ilves	Total		52	38	1	0	0	0	0	0	53	38
Haka	2014	Ykkönen	27	30	3	6	–		–		30	36
Haka	2015	Ykkönen	27	19	5	6	–		–		32	25
Haka	Total		54	49	8	12	0	0	0	0	62	61
Lahti	2016	Veikkausliiga	25	5	3	2	6	1	–		34	8
Lahti Akatemia	2016	Kakkonen	1	0	–		–		–		1	0
Haka	2017	Ykkönen	24	14	5	3	–		–		29	17
KPV	2018	Ykkönen	29	12	5	4	–		–		34	16
KTP	2019	Ykkönen	18	11	5	2	–		–		23	13
Giorgione	2019–20	Eccellenza	20	5	–		–		–		20	5
Igea 1946	2020–21	Eccellenza	6	2	–		–		–		6	2
VPS	2021	Ykkönen	27	10	3	3	–		–		30	13
VPS	2022	Veikkausliiga	30	15	4	2	3	2	–		37	19
VPS	2023	Veikkausliiga	3	0	0	0	4	2	–		7	2
VPS	2024	Veikkausliiga	17	1	2	2	4	0	1 (Note: Appearances in UEFA Conference League)	0	24	3
VPS	Total		77	26	9	7	11	4	1	0	98	37
VPS Akatemia	2023	Kolmonen	5	4	–		–		–		5	4
Haka	2025	Veikkausliiga	9	2	3	10	3	0	–		15	12
Career total			420	220	42	41	24	5	1	0	487	266

== Honours ==
VPS

- Ykkönen: 2021

Individual

- Veikkausliiga Player of the Month: August 2022
