= Ernest Simons =

Ernest Simons may refer to:

- Ernest Simons (Royal Navy officer) (1856–1928)
- Ernest Walker Simons (1848–1917), founder of the Ernest Simons Manufacturing Company of Port Chester, New York

== See also ==
- Ernest Simon (disambiguation)
