= Männikkö =

Männikkö is a Finnish surname. Notable people with the surname include:

- Miikka Männikkö (born 1979), Finnish ice hockey forward
- Veikko Männikkö (1921–2012), Finnish wrestler
