= FC OPA =

Finnish football club

FC Oulun Pallo
- Full name: Football Club Oulun Pallo
- Nickname(s): FC OPA
- Founded: 2005
- Ground: Castrenin kenttä, Oulu, Finland
- Capacity: 2,500
- Manager: Ville Väisänen
- League: Kakkonen

FC OPA (FC Oulun Pallo) is a football club from Oulu, Finland. In 2009 it plays in the third highest tier in the C-Group of Kakkonen.

The club was founded in 2005. OPA started from Vitonen (the sixth highest tier) and was promoted three times in a row after every season from 2005 to 2007. FC OPA plays its home matches in the Castren Sports Center in the Välivainio district of Oulu. The head coach of FC OPA is Ville Väisänen.
