= Ville Lyytikäinen =

Finnish football manager (born 1967)

Personal information
- Date of birth: 4 February 1967 (age 59)
- Place of birth: Helsinki, Finland
- Date of death: 19 December 2016

Managerial career
- Years: Team
- 1991–1997: HJK (youth)
- 1998: HPS
- 1999: FinnPa
- 2000–2002: Jokerit
- 2003–2004: Hämeenlinna
- 2005: Honka
- 2006: Futura
- 2007: Atlantis

Ville Lyytikäinen (4 February 1967 – 19 December 2016) was a Finnish football agent and football coach, born in Helsinki. His last work was head coach of Atlantis FC in Finland's second highest tier, Ykkönen.

In the past Lyytikäinen coached FC Jokerit, FC Hämeenlinna in top-tier Veikkausliiga and FC Honka in second-tier Ykkönen. In 2005, he was sacked from Honka after only a couple of matches and moved to the coach of FC Futura in Kolmonen, the 4th highest tier and stayed in that job to the end of the season 2006. In Atlantis Lyytikäinen started at the beginning of season 2007.

Later after his coaching career, Lyytikäinen worked as an agent, representing several Finnish players in many international transfers.

Lyytikäinen has also coached the football team of Pohjois-Haagan yhteiskoulu sports high school and was also known as the football commentator in Peliuutiset sports show in television channel YLE TV2. Before the career of football coach Lyytikäinen was a regular star in paint product television commercials. He has also starred in Vääpeli Körmy movies. Lyytikäinen died at the age of 49 in 2016.
