= Aaron Lindholm =

Finnish footballer (born 2004)

Personal information
- Date of birth: 26 April 2004 (age 22)
- Place of birth: Loviisa, Finland
- Height: 1.91 m (6 ft 3 in)
- Position: Centre-forward

Team information
- Current team: Lahti
- Number: 9

Youth career
- –2019: Loviisa
- 2019–2022: KTP

Senior career*
Years	Team	Apps	(Gls)
2022	Peli-Karhut	21	(1)
2023	Futura	19	(6)
2024	PKKU	26	(18)
2025–	Lahti	41	(12)
2025	→ Reipas Lahti (loan)	1	(1)
- * Club domestic league appearances and goals as of 13 November 2026

Aaron Lindholm (born 26 April 2004) is a Finnish professional footballer who plays as a centre-forward for Veikkausliiga club FC Lahti.

== Honours ==
Lahti

- Ykkösliiga: 2025

Individual

- Ykkönen Player of the Month: September 2024
