= Kelechukwu Nnajiofor =

Finnish-Nigerian footballer

Personal information
- Date of birth: February 28, 1990 (age 36)
- Place of birth: Nigeria
- Height: 1.82 m (5 ft 11 1/2 in)
- Position: Midfielder

Team information
- Current team: Atlantis FC
- Number: 10

Youth career
- 2005–2007: AsPa

Senior career*
| Years | Team | Apps | (Gls) |
| 2008– | Atlantis FC | 20 | (3) |
- * Club domestic league appearances and goals as of 5 August 2010

Kelechukwu Nnajiofor (born 28 February 1990) is a Finnish-Nigerian footballer who currently plays for Atlantis FC.

== Career ==
He moved in January 2008 to Atlantis FC from AsPa. In January 2010, he was on trial at Vålerenga Fotball.
