= Tuomas Silvennoinen =

Finnish football manager (born 1986)

Personal information
- Date of birth: 1986 (age 39–40)
- Place of birth: Savonlinna, Finland

Team information
- Current team: EPS (manager)

Managerial career
- Years: Team
- 2015–2018: STPS
- 2018–2019: Giorgione (assistant)
- 2022–2023: HJK (assistant)
- 2022–2023: Finland U21 (assistant)
- 2024: AC Oulu (associate manager)
- 2024–: EPS

Tuomas Silvennoinen (born 1986) is a Finnish football coach who is the head coach of Espoon Palloseura (EPS) in Ykkönen.

== Coaching career ==
During 2015–2018, Silvennoinen managed a local club Savonlinnan Työväen Palloseura (STPS) in then fourth-tier Kolmonen. In September 2018, he joined Italian club Giorgione Calcio as an assistant coach along with Gert Remmel and Iikka Miettinen, specializing in video and statistical analyses.

Silvennoinen was the assistant coach of Toni Koskela in HJK Helsinki first team during the 2022 and 2023 seasons. In January 2023, Silvennoinen was also named the assistant coach for Finland U21 national team in the coaching staff of Mika Lehkosuo. After the dismissal of Koskela in July 2023, Silvennoinen left HJK and continued working with U21-national team until the end of 2023.

On 8 November 2023, it was announced that Silvennoinen was appointed in the coaching staff of Veikkausliiga club AC Oulu, with Rauno Ojanen and Mikko Viitsalo, on a two-year deal, starting in 2024 season. Due to his lack of UEFA Pro -coaching license, Silvennoinen is not eligible to work solely as a head coach in Veikkausliiga. Silvennoinen and the whole coaching staff of AC Oulu were sacked on 13 June 2024 after 11 league matches, with a record of one win, five draws and five losses.

He was named the head coach of Ykkönen club Espoon Palloseura (EPS) on 30 September 2024.

== Personal life ==
Silvennoinen has graduated Master of Education in the University of Eastern Finland. He has also studied football in the University of Lisbon.
