= Juha Jussila =

Finnish former footballer (born 1975)

Personal information
- Date of birth: 21 August 1975 (age 51)
- Place of birth: Finland
- Height: 1.75 m (5 ft 9 in)
- Position: Midfielder

Youth career
- MPS

Senior career*
Years	Team	Apps	(Gls)
1992–1995	Germinal Ekeren	8	(0)
1996	Hangö IK		
1997	Jaro	23	(0)
1998–1999	SBV Eindhoven	37	(2)
1999–2001	Hangö IK		
2002	Honka		
2003–2007	Atlantis	50	(5)
2008	HIFK		
2008	Atlantis	5	(0)

Managerial career
- 2010: PK-35 Vantaa (assistant)
- 2016: PK-35 Vantaa (assistant)
- 2019: TiPS (assistant)
- * Club domestic league appearances and goals

Juha Jussila (born 21 August 1975) is a Finnish former professional footballer who played as a midfielder. During his career, Jussila made 23 appearances in Finnish top-tier Veikkausliiga for FF Jaro. He also played in Belgian First Division for Germinal Ekeren and in Dutch Eerste Divisie for SBV Eindhoven. He also represented Finland at youth international levels.

After his playing career, he has coached with Pasi Pihamaa in several clubs.

== Personal life ==
His twin brother Jani is also former footballer. They played together in Belgium and the Netherlands.

== Honours ==
Atlantis

- Kakkonen, Southern Group: 2004

Individual

- Atlantis Player of the Season: 2004
