= Michael Ozor =

Nigerian footballer

Micheal Ozor
Personal information
- Full name: Micheal Ozor
- Date of birth: January 13, 1988 (age 38)
- Place of birth: Lagos, Nigeria
- Height: 1.82 m (5 ft 11 1/2 in)
- Position: Defensive midfielder

Team information
- Current team: FC Kiffen
- Number: 24

Youth career
- 2001–2005: Youth Star Sporting Club
- 2006: Atlantis FC

Senior career*
Years	Team	Apps	(Gls)
2007	Atlantis FC	4	(0)
2007	SoVo (loan)	14	(1)
2008	OLS	2	(0)
2009	EIF	8	(0)
2010	Atlantis FC	12	(0)
2011–	FC Kiffen		
- * Club domestic league appearances and goals

Micheal Ozor (born 13 January 1988) is a Nigerian footballer. He currently plays for FC Kiffen.

== Career ==
Ozor previously played for the Youth Star Sporting Club in Nigeria. In 2006, he signed a contract with the Finnish first division team Atlantis FC. In mid-season 2007, he was loaned from Atlantis FC to SoVo till the end of season.

In January 2008, Ozor was on trial with Bonner SC, but played with OLS during the 2008 season. In December of that year, he was practising with AC Oulu before going to Berlin for a test game with Hertha BSC. He left in January 2009 his club AC Oulu to play the season 2009 with EIF. After one season for Ekenäs Idrottsförening announced in late April 2010 his return to Atlantis FC.
