= 1984 Ykkönen – Finnish League Division 1 =

Finnish League Division 1
- Season: 1984
- Champions: OTP Oulu
- Promoted: OTP Oulu
- Relegated: KaPa Kajaani; OPS Oulu; KTP Kotka

League table for teams participating in Ykkönen, the second tier of the Finnish Soccer League system, in 1984.

== League table ==
Pos	Team	Pld	W	D	L	GF	GA	GD	Pts
1	OTP Oulu	22	14	4	4	54	25	+29	32
2	Elo Kuopio	22	15	1	6	53	29	+24	31
3	Karpalo Joensuu	22	13	3	6	46	28	+18	29
4	Huima Äänekoski	22	12	3	7	46	37	+9	27
5	Reipas Lahti	22	10	6	6	40	28	+12	26
6	Jaro Pietarsaari	22	10	5	7	40	27	+13	25
7	GrIFK Kauniainen	22	9	3	10	29	32	−3	21
8	P-Iirot Rauma	22	6	6	10	39	37	+2	18
9	FinnPa Helsinki	22	6	5	11	28	38	−10	17
10	KaPa Kajaani	22	5	5	12	26	48	−22	15
11	OPS Oulu	22	5	4	13	18	51	−33	14
12	KTP Kotka	22	3	3	16	25	64	−39	9

== Promotion/relegation playoff ==
- Elo Kuopio - KPV Kokkola 2-1
- KPV Kokkola - Elo Kuopio 2-0

KPV Kokkola stayed in Premier Division.

== See also ==
- Mestaruussarja (Tier 1)
