= 1983 Ykkönen – Finnish League Division 1 =

Finnish League Division 1
- Season: 1983
- Champions: MP Mikkeli
- Promoted: MP Mikkeli; PPT Pori; KePS Kemi
- Relegated: Honka Espoo; HPS Helsinki; Sepsi-78 Seinäjoki

League tables for teams participating in Ykkönen, the second tier of the Finnish Soccer League system, in 1983.

== League tables ==
=== Preliminary stage ===
| Pos | Team | Pld | W | D | L | GF | GA | GD | Pts |
|---|---|---|---|---|---|---|---|---|---|
| 1 | MP Mikkeli | 22 | 13 | 5 | 4 | 39 | 18 | +21 | 31 |
| 2 | PPT Pori | 22 | 14 | 1 | 7 | 52 | 27 | +25 | 29 |
| 3 | KePS Kemi | 22 | 13 | 3 | 6 | 44 | 27 | +17 | 29 |
| 4 | Jaro Pietarsaari | 22 | 13 | 3 | 6 | 41 | 28 | +13 | 29 |
| 5 | OTP Oulu | 22 | 9 | 7 | 6 | 35 | 23 | +12 | 25 |
| 6 | GrIFK Kauniainen | 22 | 9 | 5 | 8 | 29 | 29 | 0 | 23 |
| 7 | Huima Äänekoski | 22 | 8 | 6 | 8 | 40 | 41 | −1 | 22 |
| 8 | Elo Kuopio | 22 | 9 | 4 | 9 | 32 | 36 | −4 | 22 |
| 9 | FinnPa Helsinki | 22 | 5 | 7 | 10 | 30 | 37 | −7 | 17 |
| 10 | Sepsi-78 Seinäjoki | 22 | 6 | 2 | 14 | 21 | 53 | −32 | 14 |
| 11 | Honka Espoo | 22 | 3 | 7 | 12 | 21 | 45 | −24 | 13 |
| 12 | HPS Helsinki | 22 | 4 | 2 | 16 | 26 | 46 | −20 | 10 |

Top four to Promotion/relegation Group, the rest to Division One Relegation Group.

=== Promotion/relegation group ===
| Pos | Team | Pld | W | D | L | GF | GA | GD | BP | Pts |
|---|---|---|---|---|---|---|---|---|---|---|
| 1 | KuPS Kuopio | 7 | 6 | 0 | 1 | 19 | 5 | +14 | 4 | 16 |
| 2 | MP Mikkeli | 7 | 5 | 0 | 2 | 24 | 7 | +17 | 4 | 14 |
| 3 | KePS Kemi | 7 | 5 | 1 | 1 | 16 | 7 | +9 | 2 | 13 |
| 4 | PPT Pori | 7 | 3 | 2 | 2 | 22 | 17 | +5 | 3 | 11 |
| 5 | Jaro Pietarsaari | 7 | 4 | 0 | 3 | 23 | 19 | +4 | 1 | 9 |
| 6 | OPS Oulu | 7 | 2 | 0 | 5 | 17 | 23 | −6 | 3 | 7 |
| 7 | Reipas Lahti | 7 | 1 | 1 | 5 | 14 | 17 | −3 | 2 | 5 |
| 8 | KTP Kotka | 7 | 0 | 0 | 7 | 5 | 45 | −40 | 1 | 1 |

Top four to Premier Division 1984, the rest to Division One 1984.

Note: The teams obtained bonus points on the basis of their preliminary stage position.

=== Relegation group ===
| Pos | Team | Pld | W | D | L | GF | GA | GD | Pts |
|---|---|---|---|---|---|---|---|---|---|
| 1 | OTP Oulu | 29 | 14 | 8 | 7 | 49 | 27 | +22 | 24 |
| 2 | GrIFK Kauniainen | 29 | 11 | 9 | 9 | 41 | 39 | +2 | 20 |
| 3 | FinnPa Helsinki | 29 | 8 | 10 | 11 | 42 | 43 | −1 | 18 |
| 4 | Elo Kuopio | 29 | 11 | 7 | 11 | 40 | 44 | −4 | 18 |
| 5 | Huima Äänekoski | 29 | 10 | 8 | 11 | 46 | 51 | −5 | 17 |
| 6 | Honka Espoo | 29 | 6 | 8 | 15 | 36 | 55 | −19 | 14 |
| 7 | HPS Helsinki | 29 | 6 | 4 | 19 | 37 | 62 | −25 | 11 |
| 8 | Sepsi-78 Seinäjoki | 29 | 7 | 2 | 20 | 25 | 71 | −46 | 9 |

Note: The points were halved (rounded upwards in uneven cases) after the preliminary stage.

== See also ==
- Mestaruussarja (Tier 1)
