= Ernest Simon =

Ernest Simon may refer to:

- Ernest Simon, 1st Baron Simon of Wythenshawe (1879–1960), English industrialist and politician
- Ernest Simon (footballer) (born 1980), Nigerian footballer
- Ernest Simon (fencer) (born 1952), Australian Olympic fencer
- Walter Simon (sinologist) (Ernest Julius Walter Simon, 1893–1981), Berlin-born sinologist and librarian

== See also ==
- Ernst Simon (1900–1988), German-Jewish educator and religious philosopher
