= Muwahid Sesay =

Sierra Leonean footballer

Personal information
- Full name: Muwahid Sesay
- Date of birth: 15 June 1984 (age 42)
- Place of birth: Freetown, Sierra Leone
- Position: Striker

Team information
- Current team: Ports Authority F.C.

Senior career*
Years	Team	Apps	(Gls)
2002–2007	Ports Authority F.C.	26	(11)
2007–2009	Atlantis FC	31	(5)
2009–2010	PP-70	6	(1)
2010–	Ports Authority F.C.		

International career^{‡}
2002–	Sierra Leone	4	(1)
- * Club domestic league appearances and goals as of 4 June 2012 ‡ National team caps and goals as of 4 June 2012

Muwahid Sesay (born 15 June 1984 in Freetown) is a Sierra Leonean international footballer who plays as a striker for Ports Authority F.C. in the Sierra Leone National Premier League.

== Career ==
Sesay started his professional footballing career with Sierra Leone National Premier League side Ports Authority in 2002. He was the top scorer in the Sierra Leone National Premier League in the 2003-2004 and 2004–2005 seasons. After five seasons with Ports Authority, Sesay signed for Finnish club Atlantis FC in early 2007. He was recommended to Atlantis FC by his friend and fellow Sierra Leonean international striker, Obi Metzger and signed in November 2009 for PP-70.

== International career ==
After an impressive campaign for Ports Authority in 2002, he was capped for the Leone Stars in the 2004 African Nations Cup qualifier against Gabon. Sesay made his first appearance when he came on in the second half and caused the Gabonese defenders problems with his strength and pace.
