= Milla Punsar =

Finnish footballer (born 1996)

Personal information
- Date of birth: 6 December 1996 (age 29)
- Place of birth: Espoo, Finland
- Position: Midfielder

Team information
- Current team: Honka

Youth career
- –2014: EPS

Senior career*
Years	Team	Apps	(Gls)
2015–2022	Honka	144	(41)
2022–2023	Meppen	10	(1)
2023	Honka	2	(0)
2023–2024	SC Freiburg	12	(0)
2024–	Honka	12	(5)
- * Club domestic league appearances and goals as of 26 November 2024

Milla Punsar (born 6 December 1996) is a Finnish professional footballer who plays as a midfielder for Kansallinen Liiga club Honka.

== Career statistics ==
As of 26 November 2024.

Appearances and goals by club, season and competition
Club	Season	League			Cup (Note: Includes Finnish Women's Cup and DFB-Pokal Frauen)		Europe		Other		Total	
Club	Season	Division	Apps	Goals	Apps	Goals	Apps	Goals	Apps	Goals	Apps	Goals
Honka	2015	Naisten Liiga	16	0	2	0	–		–		18	0
Honka	2016	Naisten Liiga	13	3	4	2	–		–		17	5
Honka	2017	Naisten Liiga	17	6	3	0	–		–		20	6
Honka	2018	Naisten Liiga	20	11	–		5 (Note: Includes UEFA Women's Champions League)	1	–		25	12
Honka	2019	Naisten Liiga	19	8	–		–		–		19	8
Honka	2020	Kansallinen Liiga	17	5	3	1	–		–		20	6
Honka	2021	Kansallinen Liiga	18	1	1	0	–		–		19	1
Honka	2022	Kansallinen Liiga	24	7	2	0	–		–		26	7
Honka	Total		144	41	15	3	0	0	0	0	159	44
Meppen	2022–23	Frauen-Bundesliga	10	1	–		–		–		10	1
Honka	2023	Kansallinen Liiga	2	0	–		–		–		2	0
SC Freiburg	2023–24	Frauen-Bundesliga	12	0	2	0	–		–		14	0
Honka	2024	Kansallinen Liiga	12	5	–		–		–		12	5
Career total			180	47	17	3	5	1	0	0	202	51

== Honours ==
Honka

- Naisten Liiga: 2017
- Finnish Women's Cup: 2015
