= 2007 Kakkonen – Finnish League Division 2 =

Finnish League Division 2
- Season: 2007
- Champions: Kapylan Pallo; Grankulla IFK; Kemi Kings
- Promoted: Above teams
- Relegated: 9 teams

League tables for teams participating in Kakkonen, the third tier of the Finnish Soccer League system, in 2007.

== League tables ==
=== Group A ===
Pos	Team	Pld	W	D	L	GF	GA	GD	Pts	Promotion or relegation
1	Kapylan Pallo (C, P)	26	17	6	3	46	22	+24	57	Promotion to Ykkönen
2	Kuusankoski	26	16	6	4	57	25	+32	54	
3	MP Mikkeli	26	15	4	7	39	24	+15	49	
4	LPS Helsinki	26	13	6	7	43	28	+15	45	
5	City Stars Lahti	26	13	5	8	48	29	+19	44	
6	Warkaus JK Varkaus	26	11	8	7	43	30	+13	41	
7	IF Gnistan Helsinki	26	10	9	7	43	29	+14	39	
8	Kontu Helsinki	26	9	8	9	39	35	+4	35	
9	HyPS Hyvinkää	26	10	5	11	45	42	+3	35	
10	Rakuunat	26	8	3	15	35	59	−24	27	
11	Blackbird	26	7	3	16	29	48	−19	24	
12	PuiU Helsinki (R)	26	6	6	14	29	51	−22	24	Relegation to Kolmonen
13	MPS Helsinki (R)	26	7	1	18	32	63	−31	22	Relegation to Kolmonen
14	MiKi Mikkeli (R)	26	3	4	19	25	68	−43	13	Relegation to Kolmonen

(C) Champions; (P) Promoted; (R) Relegated

=== Group B ===
Pos	Team	Pld	W	D	L	GF	GA	GD	Pts	Promotion or relegation
1	Grankulla IFK (C, P)	26	18	2	6	67	38	+29	56	Promotion to Ykkönen
2	PoPa Pori	26	15	10	1	61	22	+39	55	
3	KaaPo	26	15	2	9	58	23	+35	47	
4	KOO-VEE Tampere	26	14	4	8	38	36	+2	46	
5	Salpa	26	12	4	10	43	30	+13	40	
6	Espoo	26	10	5	11	39	41	−2	35	
7	EIF Ekenas	26	10	5	11	37	45	−8	35	
8	LoPa	26	10	4	12	35	46	−11	34	
9	Pallo-Iirot	26	8	8	10	34	36	−2	32	
10	VG-62	26	9	5	12	32	43	−11	32	
11	IFFK Palsbole	26	6	9	11	26	37	−11	27	
12	SoVo (R)	26	6	6	14	20	53	−33	24	Relegation to Kolmonen
13	MuSa (R)	26	5	8	13	24	40	−16	23	Relegation to Kolmonen
14	Masku (R)	26	5	6	15	24	48	−24	21	Relegation to Kolmonen

(C) Champions; (P) Promoted; (R) Relegated

=== Group C ===
Pos	Team	Pld	W	D	L	GF	GA	GD	Pts	OR
1	Kemi Kings (C, P)	26	18	7	1	65	16	+49	61	Promotion to Ykkönen
2	OPS Oulu	26	17	4	5	55	28	+27	55	
3	Kings Kuopio	26	16	5	5	65	23	+42	53	
4	Kiisto	26	15	4	7	45	26	+19	49	
5	YPA Ylivieska	26	13	5	8	64	43	+21	44	
6	JBK Jakobstad	26	10	8	8	51	50	+1	38	
7	OLS Oulu	26	11	4	11	36	43	−7	37	
8	Norrvalla	26	9	9	8	37	39	−2	36	
9	TP Seinajoki	26	8	10	8	46	28	+18	34	
10	Sepsi 78	26	8	7	11	40	45	−5	31	
11	Kraft	26	7	7	12	46	50	−4	28	
12	KajHa (R)	26	5	4	17	33	55	−22	19	Relegation to Kolmonen
13	Lynx (R)	26	3	2	21	24	101	−77	11	Relegation to Kolmonen
14	Kipparit (R)	26	2	4	20	24	84	−60	10	Relegation to Kolmonen

(C) Champions; (P) Promoted; (R) Relegated

== References and sources ==
- Finnish FA, Suomen Palloliitto
