= Jari-Pekka Keurulainen =

Finnish football coach (born 1956)

Personal information
- Date of birth: 7 April 1956 (age 70)
- Place of birth: Helsinki, Finland
- Position: Defender

Team information
- Current team: Finland (physioterapist)

Youth career
- Ponnistus

Senior career*
Years	Team	Apps	(Gls)
1975	Ponnistus		
1976–77	Hermannin Pallo		
1978–1980	Ponnistus		

Managerial career
- 1982–2010: Finland (assistant)
- 1987–1989: Ponnistus
- 1990–1991: HJK (assistant)
- 1992–1994: HJK
- 1995: TPV
- 1996: HJK
- 1997–1998: FinnPa
- 1999: Hämeenlinna
- 2011–: Finland (physiotherapist)
- * Club domestic league appearances and goals

Jari-Pekka Keurulainen (born 7 April 1956) is a Finnish football coach and a former player who played as a defender. He is currently working as a physiotherapist and coach of the Finland national team.

== Honours ==
HJK

- Veikkausliiga: 1992

Individual

- Football Association of Finland Captain's Ball: 2019
