= Alimamy Jalloh =

Sierra Leonean footballer

Personal information
- Date of birth: 26 September 1987 (age 39)
- Place of birth: Koidu Town, Sierra Leone
- Height: 1.72 m (5 ft 8 in)
- Position: Midfielder

Senior career*
Years	Team	Apps	(Gls)
2003–2005	Diamond Stars		
2006	F.C. Kallon		
2007	Atlantis FC		
2008	SoVo		
2008–2009	HIFK		
2010–2011	LoPa		
2011–2016	Atlantis FC		
2016–2020	SoVo		
- * Club domestic league appearances and goals

Alimamy Jalloh (born 26 September 1987) is a Sierra Leonean former professional footballer who played as a midfielder.

== Career ==
Jalloh started his football career with his hometown club the Diamond Stars of Kono District in the Sierra Leone National Premier League in 2003. Jalloh moved from F.C. Kallon to Finnish club Atlantis FC in 2007. After one year with Atlantis FC signed he in December 2007 with SoVo and in July 2008 with HIFK. In January 2010, after two years with HIFK, he signed for Lohjan Pallo.

Jalloh played for the Sierra Leone U20 national team.
