= Ykkönen =

Ykkönen (in Finnish) Ettan (in Swedish)
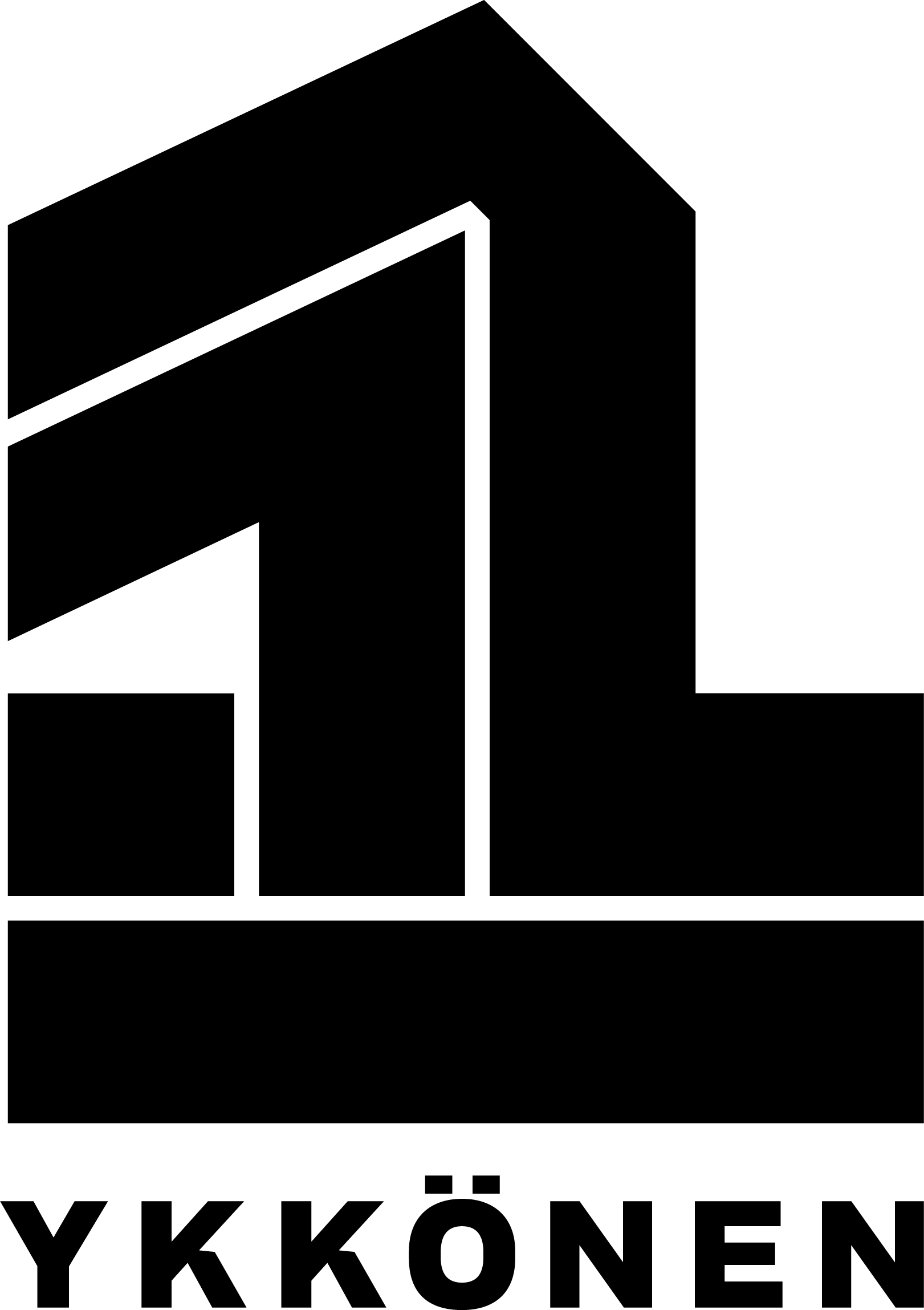
- Founded: 1973; 53 years ago
- Country: Finland
- Confederation: UEFA
- Number of clubs: 12
- Level on pyramid: 2 (1973–2023); 3 (2024–)
- Promotion to: Ykkösliiga (1–2 depending on promotion playoff)
- Relegation to: Kakkonen (2)
- Domestic cup: Finnish Cup
- Current champions: MP (5th Title) (2025)
- Most championships: MP (5 titles)
- Broadcaster(s): Ruutu+
- Website: tulospalvelu.palloliitto.fi/category/M1!spljp25/tables
- Current: 2026 Ykkönen

Ykkönen (Finnish for 'Number One'; Swedish: Ettan, previously I divisioona) is the third highest level of the Finnish football league system (after the Veikkausliiga and Ykkösliiga), managed by the Football Association of Finland. Until the end of 2023, Ykkönen was the second-highest level in Finland, but after the creation of new second-tier Ykkösliiga, it was dropped down one level in the league pyramid.

== History ==
The first league format competition in the second level of Finnish football was called Suomensarja, which was founded in 1936. Before the inauguration of the Suomensarja, from 1930 to 1935, there had been special qualification matches for the right to play in the Mestaruussarja.

In the autumn of 1969, the Finnish football underwent a league system reform, and the Suomensarja was renamed II divisioona, or 2nd Division, with regional sections.

In 1973, this level of football in Finland became nationwide, and the new name was 1. divisioona (First Division). The name Ykkönen has been used since 1995.

The new nation-wide third-tier Ykkönen started running in 2024, as the first ever nation-wide third-tier league in Finland.

== Competition ==
Like the Veikkausliiga and Ykkösliiga, Ykkönen is played mainly during the summer. It comprises 12 clubs, all of whom play 27 matches. After 22 games the division is divided to teams who finished 1-6 and 7-12. These teams play against each other once. The winner of the Ykkönen qualifies directly for promotion to Ykkösliiga. The teams that finish second, third, and fourth play a one legged playoff, with the second placed team playing against the winner of the match between the third and fourth placed team. The winner of the matches enters a two-legged playoff against the second to last team in the Veikkausliiga for promotion. The bottom 2 clubs are directly relegated to Kakkonen.

== Clubs ==
The clubs in the Ykkönen for the 2025 season are:

Club	Location	Stadium	Capacity	Manager
Atlantis FC	Helsinki	Töölön Pallokenttä	4,000	(Nigeria) Abdul Aziz Moshood
EPS	Espoo	Espoonlahden urheilupuisto	1,200	(Finland) Tuomas Silvennoinen
FC Inter Turku II	Turku	Veritas Stadion	9,372	(Finland) Vesa Vasara
FC Jazz	Pori	UK-Tekonurmi		(Finland) Ville Ulanen
JJK Jyväskylä	Jyväskylä	Harjun stadion	5,000	(Scotland) Brian Page
KPV	Kokkola	Kokkolan keskuskenttä	3,000	(Portugal) Alexandre Ferreira Ribeiro
KuPS II	Kuopio	Väre Areena	5,000	(Finland) Jarkko Wiss
MP	Mikkeli	Mikkelin Urheilupuisto	7,000	(Senegal) Issa Thiaw
AC Oulu/OLS	Oulu	Castrén	2,500	(Finland) Mikko Mannila
PK Keski-Uusimaa	Tuusula, Kerava, Järvenpää	Kalevan Urheilupuisto, Kerava	2,500	(Finland) Rami Hakanpää
RoPS	Rovaniemi	Rovaniemen keskuskenttä	2,803	(Finland) Jari Alamäki
Tampere United	Tampere	Tammelan Stadion	8,017	(Finland) Topi Priha

== Champions and top scorers of second-tier Ykkönen, 1973–2023 ==
Season	Champion	League promotions	Top scorer	Club	Goals
1973	MiPK	MiPK, FC Haka	(Finland) Matti Paatelainen	FC Haka	21
1974	MyPa	MyPa, VPS	(Finland) Kari Lehtolainen	HPS	19
1975	GBK	GBK, OPS	(Finland) Christian Nyman	GBK	16
1976	Kiffen	Kiffen, OTP	(Finland) Jarmo Lindahl	Kiffen	15
1977	KPT	KPT, Pyrkivä	(Finland) Raimo Kuuluvainen	FC Ilves	17
1978	FC Ilves	FC Ilves, KTP	(Finland) Ari Tissari	KPT	21
1979	MP	OTP, Sepsi-78	(Finland) Tuomo Hakala	RoPS	19
1980	MP	MP, RoPS, MiPK	(Finland) Keijo Kousa	FC Kuusysi	21
1981	FC Kuusysi	FC Kuusysi, KPV, Elo	(Poland) Władysław Dąbrowski	OTP	26
1982	Reipas	Reipas, RoPS	(England) Craig Ramsay	FF Jaro	18
1983	MP	MP, KePS, PPT	(Finland) Arto Keisalo (Finland) Jukka Mykkänen	HPS; MP	14
1984	OTP	OTP	(Finland) Hannu Tiilikainen	Elo	18
1985	MP	MP	(Finland) Jukka Rautakallio	FinnPa	17
1986	Reipas	Reipas	(Finland) Jari Aaltonen	TPV	18
1987	OTP	OTP	(Finland) Kalle Lehtinen	FC Kontu	18
1988	FF Jaro	FF Jaro	(Finland) Juha Lahtinen	VaKP	19
1989	KPV	KPV, Kumu	(Finland) Mauri Keskitalo	MyPa	18
1990	PPT	PPT, FF Jaro	(Finland) Janne Murtomäki (Finland) Jari Vanhala	FC Kontu; Grankulla IFK	14
1991	MyPa	MyPa	(Soviet Union) Igor Danilov	Kumu	17
1992	TPV	TPV, FinnPa	(Poland) Tomasz Arceusz (Russia) Oleg Ivanov (Russia) Valeri Popovitch	VPS; TPV; TPV	16
1993	KuPS	KuPS, FC Oulu	(Finland) Kimmo Savolainen	KePS	17
1994	Ponnistus	Ponnistus, VPS	(Finland) Mika Riutto	Reipas	15
1995	FC Inter	FC Inter	(Finland) Mika Marjamaa	KePS	18
1996	TP-Seinäjoki	TP-Seinäjoki	(Brazil) Luciano Martins	FC Kuusysi	18
1997	FC Haka	FC Haka, PK-35	(Russia) Valeri Popovitch	FC Haka	25
1998	FC Lahti	FC Lahti, KTP, Inter, TPV	(Finland) Ismo Lius	FC Lahti	18
1999	Tampere United	Tampere United	(Brazil) Dionísio	Tampere United	24
2000	KuPS	KuPS, Atlantis FC	(Finland) Niclas Grönholm	Hangö IK	25
2001	FC Hämeenlinna	FC Hämeenlinna FF Jaro	(Finland) Jani Myllyniemi	HIFK	18
2002	KuPS	KuPS, FC Jokerit, FC KooTeePee	(Finland) Janne Kauria	FC Honka	17
2003	TP-47	TP-47, RoPS	(Finland) Mikko Mäkelä	PP-70	15
2004	KuPS	KuPS, IFK Mariehamn	(Finland) Miikka Oinonen	MP	15
2005	FC Honka	FC Honka, VPS	(The Gambia) Dawda Bah (Finland) Rami Louke	KPV; VPS	16
2006	FC Viikingit	FC Viikingit, AC Oulu	(Finland) Petteri Kaijasilta	PK-35	19
2007	KuPS	KuPS, RoPS	(Finland) Petteri Kaijasilta	PK-35	18
2008	JJK Jyväskylä	JJK	(Nigeria) Babatunde Wusu	JJK	22
2009	AC Oulu	AC Oulu	(Finland) Pekka Sihvola	FC Hämeenlinna	20
2010	RoPS	RoPS	(Georgia (country)) Irakli Sirbiladze	KPV	16
2011	FC Lahti	FC Lahti	(Finland) Ville Salmikivi	FC Viikingit	20
2012	RoPS	RoPS	(Finland) Aleksandr Kokko	RoPS	15
2013	SJK	SJK	(Finland) Jussi Aalto	Haka	15
2014	HIFK	HIFK, FC KTP, FC Ilves	(Finland) Kalle Multanen	Haka	30
2015	PS Kemi	PS Kemi, PK-35 Vantaa	(Finland) Kalle Multanen	Haka	19
2016	JJK	JJK	(Democratic Republic of the Congo) Aristote M'Boma	AC Oulu	18
2017	TPS	TPS, FC Honka	(Finland) Kalle Multanen (Brazil) Felix de Bona	Haka; EIF	14
2018	HIFK	HIFK, KPV	(Mexico) Alberto Alvarado Morín	AC Oulu	17
2019	Haka	Haka, TPS	(Finland) Salomo Ojala	Haka	23
2020	AC Oulu	AC Oulu, KTP	(South Africa) Darren Smith	EIF	18
2021	Vaasan Palloseura	VPS	(Brazil) Douglas Caé	Gnistan	14
2022	KTP	KTP	(Spain) Mika	KTP	15
2023	EIF	EIF, Gnistan	(Finland) Joakim Latonen	Gnistan	19

== Champions and top scorers of third-tier Ykkönen, 2024– ==
Season	Champion	League promotions	Top scorer	Club	Goals
2024	Klubi 04	Klubi 04	(Finland) Aaron Lindholm	PKKU	18
2025	MP	MP	(Ghana) Torfiq Ali-Abubakar	MP	22
