= Iikka Miettinen =

Finnish football coach, born 1990)

Personal information
- Full name: Iikka Henrikki Miettinen
- Date of birth: 20 July 1990 (age 36)
- Place of birth: Tampere, Finland
- Position: Centre back

Team information
- Current team: Ilves (sporting director)

Youth career
- Years: Team
- TPV
- Haka
- TKT Tampere
- PP-70

Managerial career
- 2018–2019: Zenit (academy director)
- 2019–2020: Giorgione (assistant)
- 2020–2022: Pafos U19 (assistant)
- 2022: Novigrad (assistant)
- 2023: Honka (assistant)
- 2024–2025: Ilves U19
- 2025: Ilves II
- 2026–: Ilves (sporting director)

Iikka Henrikki Miettinen (born 20 July 1990) is a Finnish professional football coach who is currently the sporting director of Veikkausliiga club Ilves.

== Career ==
Born in Tampere, Miettinen played football in the youth sectors of TPV, Haka, TKT Tampere and PP-70. After fulfilling the mandatory conscription service in Finland, Miettinen moved to St. Petersburg, Russia when aged 21, to study football coaching at the Lesgafta University. During his studies, Miettinen had stints working as analyst for Zenit Academy and Dinamo Zagreb Academy in Croatia. During 2016–2019, he worked for the Zenit Saint Petersburg organisation as analyst and the academy director.

In 2019, he moved to Italy and joined Giorgione as assistant coach with Gert Remmel.

During 2020–2022, he worked for the academy of Cypriot club Pafos and as assistant coach of Croatian club NK Novigrad.

In January 2023, Miettinen returned to Finland and started as assistant coach of Veikkausliiga club Honka. Next year he was named the head coach of the under-19 team of Veikkausliiga club Ilves, leading the team to finish third in the domestic league. In February 2025, after the departure of Guillem Santesmases, Miettinen was named the head coach of the club's reserve team Ilves II.
