= Abdul Aziz Moshood =

Nigerian footballer and manager

Abdul-Aziz Moshood
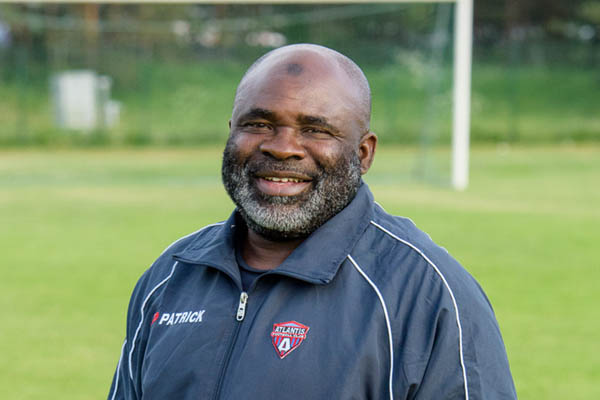

Personal information
- Full name: Abdul Aziz "Bola" Moshood
- Date of birth: 22 July 1968 (age 58)
- Place of birth: Kaduna, Nigeria
- Height: 1.60 m (5 ft 3 in)
- Position: Striker

Youth career
- 1984–1986: NNPC FC (Nigeria 1st division)
- 1985: Nigeria National Team under-18

Senior career*
Years	Team	Apps	(Gls)
1987–1990	FC Ilves		
1991–1992	FC Kontu		
1992–1995	Helsingin Ponnistus	10	
1996	Dynamo Dresden (trial)		
- Stuttgarter Kickers (trial)

Managerial career
- 1999–2000: Team Talent Instructor for federation of Finland
- 2000: PK-35 Helsinki, U-17
- 2001: PK-35 Helsinki, U-20
- 2002: PK-35 Helsinki, U-20 Premier league
- 2005–2006: FC Ponnistus Finland Pro
- 2006–2009: ProSkills Football Academy Helsinki (Director)
- 2009–2010: Atlantis FC Helsinki Finland Pro
- 2011–2013: IF Gnistan Helsinki Finland (Head of Academy)
- 2013: Mohammedan Sporting Club
- 2015: FC KäPa of Helsinki
- 2016–2017: FC Finnkurd
- 2018: Atlantis FC
- * Club domestic league appearances and goals

Moshood 'Bola' Abdul Aziz (born 22 July 1968 in Kaduna) is a retired Nigerian footballer. He currently works as the coach of the Atlantis FC in Ykkönen, the third tier of Finnish football

== Career ==
Moshood started his career in Nigeria, playing professionally for FC Ilves. Ponnistus, Huima, FC Kontu in Finland.

== Coaching career ==
He began his coaching career in 1998-2004 for PK-35, a Youth Premier League team and as head coach of Ponnistus FC—a Pro-Second Division in Finland 2005-2008. He was also in charge of the Helsinki International Youth Cup annual summer tournament.

On 30 March 2010, Bola was named the head coach of the Atlantis FC, a Pro-Second Division club in Finland. In the same capacity, he is also the director of coaching for the youth team -- Atlantis FC Akatemia. Coach Bola helped Atlantis to redeem its image after losing 12 games in 13 pre season games and draw one game in preparation for the 2010 Season. He helped Atlantis win their first ever game in the season in the first match at the start of the season against FC FUTURA. Bola, as he is popularly known, specializes in training methods, focusing on discipline and technique. After he became their manager, Atlantis quickly became one of Helsinki's more successful football teams.

He came to India in 2013 to work in the Indian Super League, the highest level of Indian professional football, overseeing several records during his one-year tenure at Mohammedan Sporting Club (MSC), such as setting the scoring record with a 7-nil victory. They won the 2013 Durand Cup with a 2-1 victory over ONGC in the final, ending their 73 year-long trophy drought.

As of 2016, Moshood has been the head coach of the Helsinki based team called FC Finnkurd. They will be playing in the Respect Finnish Cup on the Fall 2016.

== Achievements ==
=== As player ===
In 1985 Moshood was a member of Nigeria National team under-18 years that won a gold medal in the World Cup in Tampere, Finland, in 1985. He was the top scorer of the competition. Moshood played with the Nigeria National League for under-20 team. At the Adebajo Cup, the team won a gold medal in 1985 and a silver medal in 1986.

In 1987, he won a bronze medal with FC Ilves under-20-year team in the Finnish league. Between the years 1992 and 1995 he was a member of FC Ponnistus. On that time, the team was promoted twice. At first to the first division and secondly to Premier League of Finland. In 1994 FC Ponnistus was on the top in the first division.

=== As manager ===
Moshood has won three medals from two tournaments and a Helsinki District Championship between 1999 and 2001 with FC PK-35 in Finland. Under the season 2001-2002, Moshood was promoted to manage the Premier League instead of the first division of the FC PK-35.

In 2013 Moshood led their team Mohammedan Sporting Club to championship in the Durand Cup in India. PROMOTION, Atlantis FC U-20 to the Premier league 2018, PROMOTION, Atlantis Academy to the Third Division 2018, Finland Football Federation U-20 Premier league, I lead Atlantis FC TO SILVA MEDAL 2019, In the same capacity, I lead Atlantis FC senior team to PROMOTION to Second division 2019, Finland Football Federation U-20 Premier league, I lead Atlantis FC to SILVA MEDAL 2020.
