= Kaurialan kenttä =

Stadium in Hämeenlinna, Finland

Coordinates: 60°59′37″N 24°26′31″E

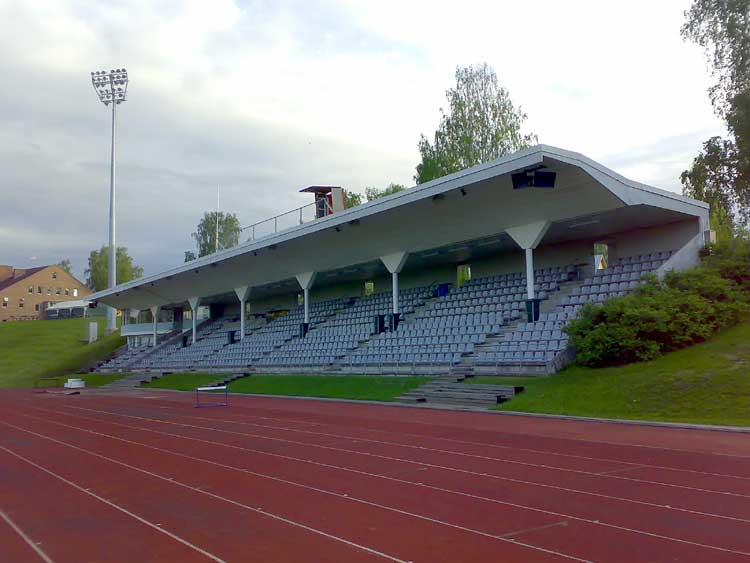
- Interactive map of Kaurialan kenttä
- Location: Hämeenlinna, Finland
- Owner: City of Hämeenlinna
- Capacity: 4000

Construction
- Renovated: 1988

Tenant
- FC Hämeenlinna

Kaurialan kenttä is a multi-use stadium in Hämeenlinna, Finland. It is currently used mostly for football matches and is the home stadium of FC Hämeenlinna. The stadium holds 4,000 people.
