= Espoon Palloseura =

Finnish football team

EPS
- Full name: Espoon Palloseura
- Founded: 1970
- Ground: Espoonlahden urheilupuisto
- Capacity: 1,200
- Manager: Tuomas Silvennoinen
- League: Kakkonen
- 2026: Kakkonen Group B, 4th of 10
- Website: https://www.espoonpalloseura.fi/

Espoon Palloseura (EPS) is a Finnish football club, based in Espoo. The club was founded in 1970 and it currently competes in the Ykkönen, the third-tier of Finnish football league system. The club is based at the Espoonlahden urheilupuisto in the Espoonlahti district of Espoo, and its women's team competes in Naisten Kakkonen.

== Season-by-season ==
Season to season of EPS

Season	Level	Division	Section	Administration	Position	Movements
1975	Tier 5	4. divisioona (Fourth Division)	Group 3	Finnish FA	5th	
1976	Tier 5	4. divisioona (Fourth Division)	Group 2	Finnish FA	5th	
1977	Tier 5	4. divisioona (Fourth Division)	Group 4	Finnish FA	8th	Relegated
1978	Tier 6					Promoted
1979	Tier 5	4. divisioona (Fourth Division)	Group 4	Finnish FA	10th	Relegated
1980						Unknown
1981						Unknown
1982						Unknown
1983						Unknown
1984						Unknown
1985	Tier 5	4. divisioona (Fourth Division)	Group 3	Finnish FA	6th	
1986	Tier 5	4. divisioona (Fourth Division)	Group 3	Finnish FA	11th	Relegated
1987	Tier 6					Promoted
1988	Tier 5	4. divisioona (Fourth Division)				Promoted
1989	Tier 4	3.divisioona (Third Division)	Group 2	Helsinki & Uusimaa	4th	
1990						Unknown
1991						Unknown
1992						Unknown
1993						Unknown
1994						Unknown
1995						Unknown
1996						Unknown
1997						Unknown
1998						Unknown
1999						Unknown
2000	Tier 7	Kutonen (Sixth Division)	Group 2	Uusimaa District	7th	
2001	Tier 7	Kutonen (Sixth Division)	Group 2	Uusimaa District	8th	
2002	Tier 7	Kutonen (Sixth Division)	Group 3	Uusimaa District	3rd	
2003	Tier 7	Kutonen (Sixth Division)	Group 3	Uusimaa District	3rd	
2004						Unknown
2005	Tier 7	Kutonen (Sixth Division)	Group 3	Uusimaa District	4th	
2006	Tier 7	Kutonen (Sixth Division)	Group 4	Uusimaa District	1st	Promoted
2007	Tier 6	Vitonen (Fifth Division)	Group 2	Uusimaa District	9th	Relegated
2008	Tier 7	Kutonen (Sixth Division)	Group 2	Uusimaa District	1st	Promoted - took place from EPS/Valkoinen and promoted straight to Nelonen
2009	Tier 5	Nelonen	Uusimaa Group 1		6th	
2010	Tier 5	Nelonen	Uusimaa Group 2		3rd	
2011	Tier 5	Nelonen	Uusimaa Group 1		5th	
2012	Tier 5	Nelonen	Uusimaa Group 1		8th	
2013	Tier 5	Nelonen	Uusimaa Group 1		3rd	
2014	Tier 5	Nelonen	Uusimaa Group 1		3rd	
2015	Tier 5	Nelonen				Promoted
2016	Tier 4	Kolmonen (Third Division)	Helsinki & Uusimaa I	Helsinki & Uusimaa (SPL Helsinki)	10th	
2017	Tier 4	Kolmonen (Third Division)	Helsinki & Uusimaa I	Helsinki & Uusimaa (SPL Helsinki)	7th	
2018	Tier 4	Kolmonen (Third Division)	Helsinki & Uusimaa I	Helsinki & Uusimaa (SPL Helsinki)	1st	Promoted
2019	Tier 3	Kakkonen	Group B	Finnish FA	10th	
2020	Tier 3	Kakkonen	Group A	Finnish FA	7th	
2021	Tier 3	Kakkonen	Group B	Finnish FA	11th	
2022	Tier 3	Kakkonen	Group B	Finnish FA	10th	
2023	Tier 3	Kakkonen	Group B	Finnish FA	1st	Promoted
2024	Tier 3	Ykkönen		Finnish FA	9th	
2025	Tier 3	Ykkönen		Finnish FA		

- 7 seasons in 3rd Tier
- 4 seasons in 4th Tier
- 14 seasons in 5th Tier
- 3 seasons in 6th Tier
- 7 season in 7th Tier

== Notable former players ==
- (Finland) Glen Kamara
- (Finland) Lassi Lappalainen
- (Finland) Tapio Heikkilä
- (Finland) Milla Punsar
- (Finland) Linda Ruutu
