= Timo Askolin =

Finnish football manager

Timo Askolin is the head coach of Allianssi Vantaa football club, a Finnish football club from Vantaa.
