= Miikka Mujunen =

Finnish footballer (born 1996)

Personal information
- Full name: Miikka Roni Mujunen
- Date of birth: 14 August 1996 (age 30)
- Place of birth: Lahti, Finland
- Height: 1.86 m (6 ft 1 in)
- Position: Goalkeeper

Youth career
- FC Kuusysi

Senior career*
Years	Team	Apps	(Gls)
2012–2017	Lahti	14	(0)
2012–2017	Kuusysi	50	(0)
2018–2020	TPS	19	(0)
- * Club domestic league appearances and goals as of 00:07, 25 December 2020 (UTC)

Miikka Roni Mujunen (born 14 August 1996) is a Finnish professional footballer who plays as a goalkeeper.
