= Ernest Simon (footballer) =

Nigerian footballer

Personal information
- Date of birth: 22 June 1985 (age 41)
- Place of birth: Nigeria
- Height: 1.87 m (6 ft 1 1/2 in)
- Position: Midfielder

Team information
- Current team: Eledi FC Lagos
- Number: 6

Senior career*
Years	Team	Apps	(Gls)
2007	Gombe United F.C.	26	(5)
2008–2009	Atlantis FC	34	(2)
2010–	Eledi FC Lagos		
- * Club domestic league appearances and goals ‡ National team caps and goals as of A

Ernest Simon (born 22 June 1985) is a Nigerian footballer, who currently plays for Eledi FC Lagos.

== Playing career ==
He began his career by Gombe United F.C. before moved in January 2008 to Atlantis FC.
