= Miikka Oinonen =

Finnish footballer (born 1983)

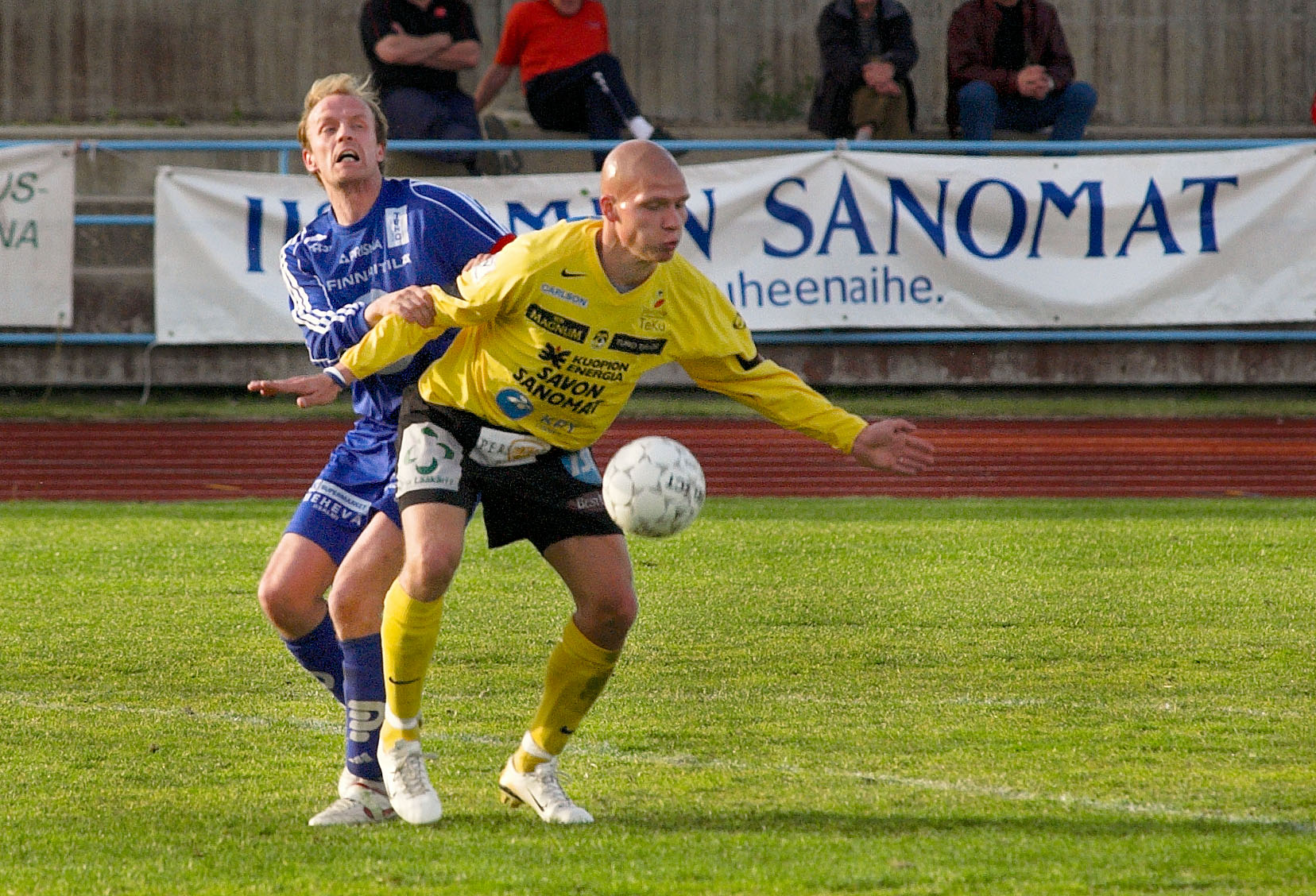
- Miikka Oinonen playing in the Finnish Cup with KuPS in 2006

Personal information
- Full name: Miikka Oinonen
- Date of birth: 26 May 1983 (age 43)
- Place of birth: Mikkeli, Finland
- Height: 1.85 m (6 ft 1 in)
- Position: Striker

Team information
- Current team: Ristiinan Pallo
- Number: 10

Youth career
- –2001: MP

Senior career*
Years	Team	Apps	(Gls)
2001	FC Mikkeli	11	(0)
2002	Rakuunat	12	(1)
2003	MiKi		
2004	MP	25	(15)
2005	TPS	8	(1)
2005–2007	KuPS	57	(12)
2008–2010	MP	58	(20)
2011	KoRe	1	(2)
2012	FC–84		
2013–2015	MiKi	32	(24)
2016	FC–84	3	(5)
2017	Ristiinan	10	(7)
2017–2018	MP	24	(17)
2019	Ristiinan	10	(19)
2019	MP	5	(1)
2020–	Ristiinan		
- * Club domestic league appearances and goals

Miikka Oinonen (born 26 May 1983) is a Finnish footballer who plays for Ristiinan Pallo as a striker.

== Club career ==
Miikka Oinonen was youth-trained at Mikkelin Palloilijat. While playing for MP in the Ykkönen in 2004, he scored 14 goals, and was the league's top scorer. This attracted attention from larger clubs, and he joined Turun Palloseura in 2005, allowing him to play in Veikkausliiga for the first time. He found little success with TPS and after only a few months he transferred to another Veikkausliiga club in July 2005, Kuopion Palloseura.

With KuPS, he played in the Veikkausliiga for one and a half seasons, appearing in 33 league matches and scoring nine goals. In 2006, Miikka won the Finnish League Cup, scoring both goals in the final against FC KooTeePee and was named the player of the match. The six league goals he scored in the 2006 Veikkausliiga season led the team. However, KuPS was relegated at the end of the season, and nearly went bankrupt. Back in the Ykkönen, Oinonen scored 3 goals in 24 games as KuPS was promoted back to the Veikkausliiga. However, Oinonen would return to MP following the season.

In 2017, Miikka returned to MP and scored 17 goals in 24 matches across the next two seasons, after which he decided to retire. However, by March of the following season, he decided to continue playing, but at a lower level with Ristiinan Pallo in the Kolmonen. After scoring 19 goals in 10 games with Ristiinan, MP decided to bring Oinonen back for one more season, and Oinonen helped MP get promoted from the Kakkonen to the Ykkönen. He then returned to Ristiinan, where he continues to play.
