= Välivainio =

- District of Oulu
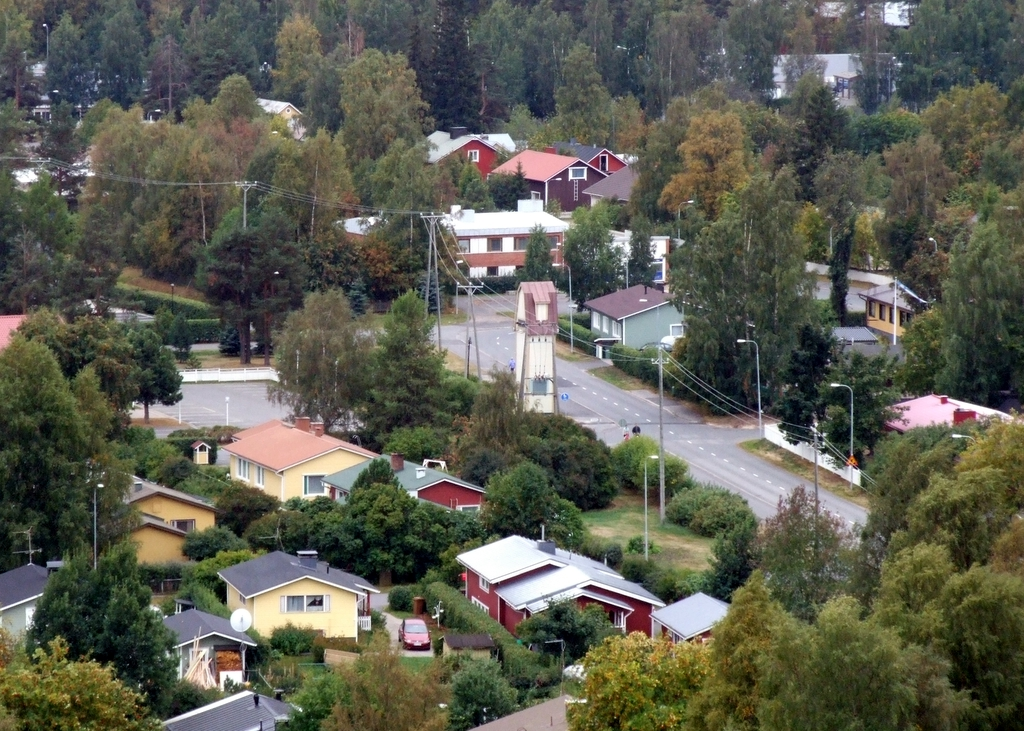
- Interactive map of Välivainio
- Country: Finland
- City: Oulu
- Areas of Oulu: Puolivälinkangas area

Population (2013)
  - Total: 2 693
- Postal code: 90530

Välivainio is a neighbourhood in the Puolivälinkangas area in the city of Oulu, Finland. It is located about 2 km north of the city centre. It is bordered by National road 4 in the north and east, National road 20 in the south and National road 8156 in the west.

Välivainio is mainly residential area with most of the shops and industries along the Paulaharjuntie street. The Castrén football stadium is located in Välivainio.
