= Ernest Walker Simons =

English–American textile businessman

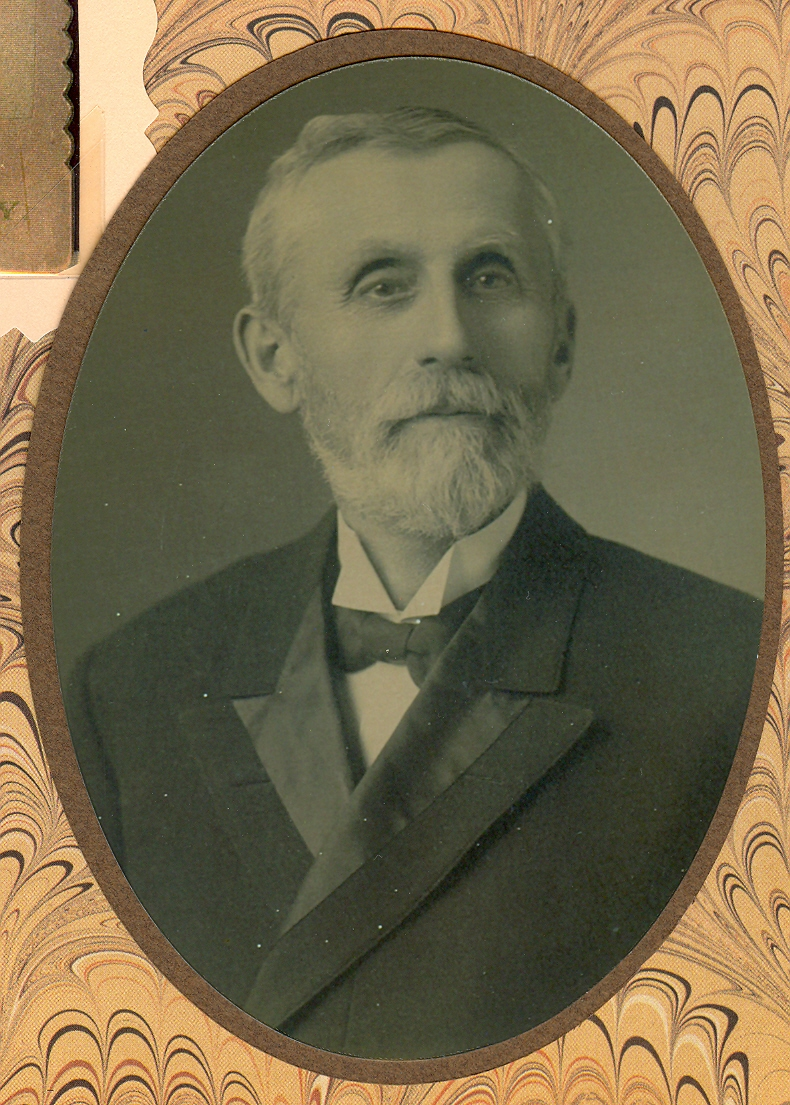
- Born: October 11, 1848; Ullesthorpe, Wibtoft, Leicestershire, England
- Died: February 1, 1917 (aged 68)
- Spouse: Anna Willis (m. 1873)
- Children: 4

Ernest Walker Simons (October 11, 1848 – February 1, 1917) was the founder of the Ernest Simons Manufacturing Company of Port Chester, New York, manufacturer of shirts, sheets, and pillowcases.

== Early life ==
Simons was born in Ullesthorpe, Wibtoft, Leicestershire, England to James Walker Simons and Jane Ann Loveitt. He was the oldest of eight children. The family emigrated to Connecticut in 1858, eventually settling in Mamaroneck, New York.

== Career ==
Trained as a mechanical engineer, Simons first became involved in the manufacture of various tools and hardware at Riversville, Connecticut. In 1876, Simons joined the firm N.C. Pond & Company in a former shovel factory, making shirts on a small scale. In 1879, a partnership was formed under the name Pond, West & Simons, consisting of N.C. Pond, Marshall O. West, and Simons. In addition to manufacturing shirts, they also sold and repaired sewing machines. They built a two story frame building as their factory, soon adding a third story. After N.C. Pond left the business in 1892, the firm was renamed West & Simons, until the death of West in January 1902, when it became known as the Ernest Simons Manufacturing Company. During the latter period, a large brick factory was constructed consisting of three buildings with a floor space of 152,000 square feet, employing 800 people. The firm manufactured shirts, sheets, pillow cases, and related items for various American brands such as Fruit of the Loom, Anchor, Whitehorn, and others. During World War I, they were also contracted to produce military clothing. It was one of the largest firms of its type in the country during its operation. Many of his family members were among the board of directors during his leadership. Apart from the shirt factory, Simons was also involved as a Director with the Port Chester First National Bank.

== Personal life ==
On January 2, 1873, Simons married Anna Willis, daughter of Judge Anson Willis. Together they had four children. Simons was heavily involved as a trustee with the Summerfield M.E. Church in Port Chester. He was a benefactor to the YMCA, the Summerfield M.E. Church, and he also built a mission in India. He was a supporter of the temperance movement, and allowed meetings to be held at the factory. At his funeral, Bishop William F. Anderson of Cincinnati wrote a eulogy in his honor about his devotion to his religion and to charity.
