= Torfiq Ali-Abubakar =

Ghanaian footballer (born 2001)

Personal information
- Date of birth: 8 February 2001 (age 25)
- Place of birth: Hohoe, Ghana
- Height: 1.80 m (5 ft 11 in)
- Position: Forward

Team information
- Current team: Haka
- Number: 9

Youth career
- –2019: NADM SC
- 2019–2020: Jablonec

Senior career*
Years	Team	Apps	(Gls)
2019–2023	Jablonec B	27	(14)
2021–2023	Jablonec	3	(0)
2022	→ Prostějov (loan)	10	(1)
2023	TPS	24	(5)
2024	KPV	18	(6)
2025	MP	25	(22)
2026–	Haka	24	(8)
- * Club domestic league appearances and goals as of 1 November 2026

Torfiq Ali-Abubakar (born 8 February 2001) is a Ghanaian professional footballer who plays as a forward for Haka in Ykkösliiga.

== Career statistics ==
As of 21 October 2024.

Appearances and goals by club, season and competition
Club	Season	League			Cup (Note: Includes Czech Cup and Suomen Cup)		Europe		Other		Total	
Club	Season	Division	Apps	Goals	Apps	Goals	Apps	Goals	Apps	Goals	Apps	Goals
Jablonec B	2020–21	ČFL	1	1	–		–		–		1	1
Jablonec B	2021–22	ČFL	26	13	–		–		–		26	13
Jablonec B	Total		27	14	0	0	0	0	0	0	27	14
Jablonec	2021–22	Czech First League	3	0	0	0	0	0	–		3	0
Prostějov (loan)	2022–23	FNL	10	1	3	2	–		–		13	3
TPS	2023	Ykkönen	24	5	0	0	–		3 (Note: Includes Ykköscup)	0	27	5
KPV	2024	Ykkönen	18	6	3	1	–		–		21	7
MP	2025	Ykkönen	4	0	0	0	–		–		4	0
Career total			86	26	6	3	0	0	3	0	95	32

== Honours ==
KPV

- Ykkönen runner-up: 2024
