= Tero Pilvi =

Finnish footballer

Personal information
- Date of birth: 21 February 1978 (age 48)
- Place of birth: Finland
- Height: 1.72 m (5 ft 8 in)
- Positions: Midfielder; winger

Senior career*
Years	Team	Apps	(Gls)
- HIK
	PK-35	22+	(1+)
2000-2001	Airdrieonians	9	(2)
2001	Cambridge United	5	(0)
- * Club domestic league appearances and goals

Tero Pilvi (born 21 February 1976) is a Finnish former footballer who is last known to have played as a midfielder or winger for Cambridge United. After retirement, he became a scientist.

== Career ==
Pili started his career with NuPS. After that, he signed for HIK. After that, he signed for PK-35. After that, he signed for FC Atlantis.

In 2000, Pilvi signed for the Scottish second division side Airdrieonians. In 2001, he signed for Cambridge United in the English third division.
