= Pasi Pihamaa =

Finnish footballer and coach (born 1972)

Pasi Pihamaa born (17 September 1972) is a Finnish football manager and former player. As a player, he played for Belgian clubs Denderleeuw and Hamme and for English side Billericay Town among others.

== Playing career ==
Pihamaa was born in Helsinki, Finland. He played KäPa, Ponnistus, FC Denderleeuw (Belgium, 1996–97), Hamme (Belgium, 1997–98), PK-35 (1999), Atlantis FC (2000), HIFK Fotboll (2001), Billericay Town (England, 2001–02), FC Honka (2002)

== Honours ==
Atlantis FC

- Kakkoscup: 2003
- Kakkonen South Group and promotion: 2004
