= Miikka Männikkö =

Finnish ice hockey player

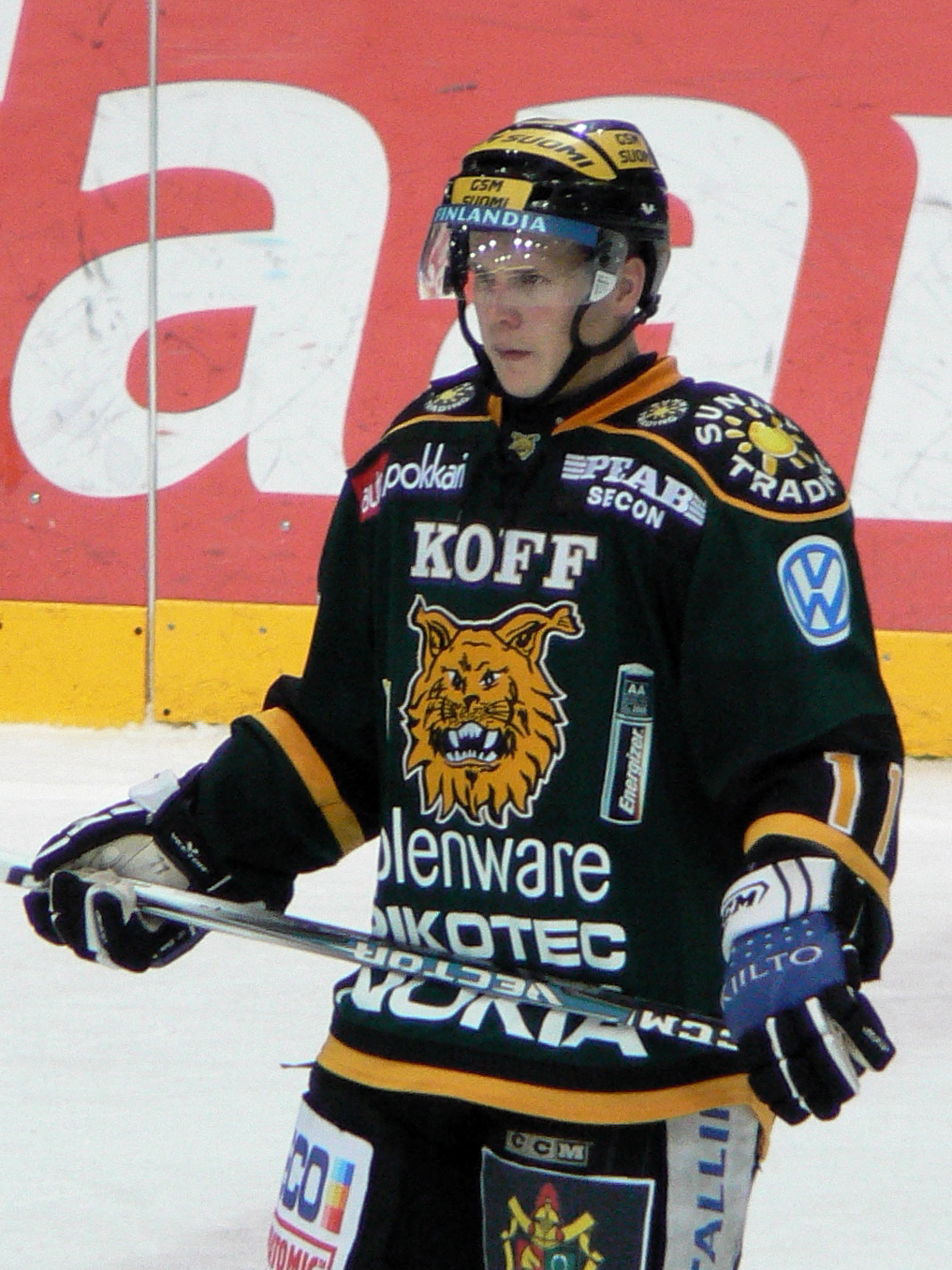
- Born: March 27, 1979 (age 45); Tampere, Finland
- Height: 5 ft 7 in (170 cm)
- Weight: 172 lb (78 kg; 12 st 4 lb)
- Position: Right wing
- Shot: Right
- SM-liiga team: Lahti Pelicans
- NHL draft: Undrafted
- Playing career: 1996–2016

Miikka Männikkö (born March 27, 1979) is a Finnish professional ice hockey forward who currently plays for Tappara of the SM-liiga.

== Career statistics ==
			Regular season					Playoffs
Season	Team	League	GP	G	A	Pts	PIM	GP	G	A	Pts	PIM
1993–94	Tappara U16	U16 SM-sarja	6	2	2	4	0	3	1	0	1	0
1994–95	Tappara U16	U16 SM-sarja	24	17	16	33	32	5	3	2	5	0
1995–96	Tappara U18	U18 SM-sarja	19	10	16	26	40	4	0	7	7	4
1995–96	Tappara U20	U20 I-divisioona	9	7	5	12	4	—	—	—	—	—
1996–97	Tappara U18	U18 SM-sarja	4	3	5	8	6	—	—	—	—	—
1996–97	Tappara U20	U20 I-divisioona	—	—	—	—	—	13	5	4	9	8
1996–97	Koovee	I-Divisioona	22	7	8	15	16	—	—	—	—	—
1997–98	Diskos	I-Divisioona	44	11	34	45	28	—	—	—	—	—
1998–99	Tappara U20	U20 SM-liiga	5	4	1	5	10	—	—	—	—	—
1998–99	Tappara	SM-liiga	5	0	0	0	0	—	—	—	—	—
1998–99	Diskos	I-Divisioona	9	2	2	4	4	—	—	—	—	—
1998–99	JYP Jyväskylä	SM-liiga	30	5	4	9	12	3	0	0	0	0
1999–00	Tappara U20	U20 SM-liiga	1	1	1	2	0	—	—	—	—	—
1999–00	Tappara	SM-liiga	31	1	2	3	14	—	—	—	—	—
1999–00	Espoo Blues	SM-liiga	23	3	3	6	16	4	0	0	0	0
2000–01	Espoo Blues	SM-liiga	1	0	0	0	0	—	—	—	—	—
2000–01	KJT	Mestis	41	17	25	42	38	3	0	1	1	14
2001–02	Jukurit	Mestis	44	12	11	23	24	9	8	5	13	6
2002–03	IK Nykoping	HockeyAllsvenskan	42	24	23	47	16	—	—	—	—	—
2003–04	IK Nykoping	HockeyAllsvenskan	44	23	18	41	20	2	1	0	1	14
2004–05	Växjö Lakers HC	HockeyAllsvenskan	39	20	13	33	10	2	0	1	1	2
2005–06	JYP Jyväskylä	SM-liiga	56	10	13	23	20	3	0	0	0	4
2006–07	JYP Jyväskylä	SM-liiga	54	14	25	39	34	—	—	—	—	—
2007–08	Ilves	SM-liiga	54	10	16	26	59	9	4	7	11	4
2008–09	Ilves	SM-liiga	55	14	31	45	34	3	0	3	3	4
2009–10	HPK	SM-liiga	56	15	19	34	36	17	2	6	8	10
2010–11	HPK	SM-liiga	46	9	13	22	57	1	0	0	0	0
2011–12	Tappara	SM-liiga	57	11	16	27	36	—	—	—	—	—
2012–13	Tappara	SM-liiga	3	0	0	0	0	—	—	—	—	—
2012–13	Växjö Lakers HC	Elitserien	10	0	3	3	4	—	—	—	—	—
2012–13	LeKi	Mestis	2	2	0	2	0	—	—	—	—	—
2012–13	Lahti Pelicans	SM-liiga	34	8	16	24	8	—	—	—	—	—
2013–14	Lahti Pelicans	Liiga	49	6	13	19	41	—	—	—	—	—
2013–14	Ilves	Liiga	9	0	2	2	0	—	—	—	—	—
2014–15	LeKi	Mestis	26	8	20	28	16	—	—	—	—	—
2014–15	Graz 99ers	EBEL	7	1	1	2	4	—	—	—	—	—
2014–15	Jukurit	Mestis	12	3	15	18	6	13	4	4	8	2
2015–16	LeKi	Mestis	39	13	15	28	43	—	—	—	—	—
2015–16	Vaasan Sport	Liiga	7	1	3	4	4	—	—	—	—	—
SM-liiga totals			570	107	176	283	371	40	6	16	22	22
