= FC Hämeenlinna =

Association football club

- Full name: FC Hämeenlinna
- Nickname: Valkoiset (Whites)
- Founded: 1991
- Ground: Kauriala, Hämeenlinna
- Capacity: 4,000
- Chairman: Tapio Virtanen
- Manager: Tomi Uusitorppa
- League: Kutonen
Home colours	Away colours

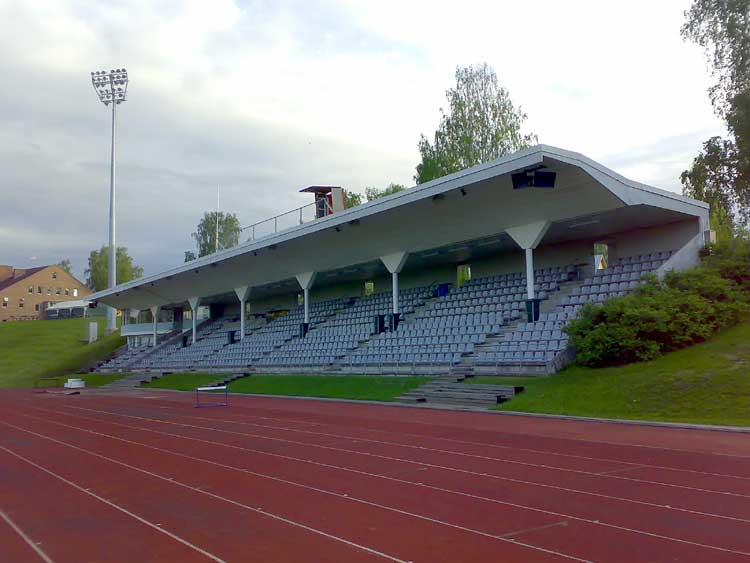
Kaurialan kenttä

FC Hämeenlinna is a Finnish football club, based in Hämeenlinna. The club's manager is Tomi Uusitorppa, and it plays its home matches at Kauriala.

The team was formed in 1991.

== Club's history ==
=== Initial years ===
FC Hämeenlinna was founded in autumn 1991, when the town's two football teams HPK and Pallo-Kärpät decided to merge. In the spring of 1992, K-Team took the place of HPK in the Kolmonen. The team were coached by Seppo Pyykkö and Teuvo Palkki.

FC Hämeenlinna in the autumn of 1993 gained promotion to the Kakkonen, where their stay was short-lived, as they gained promotion this time to the Ykkönen. The club played at this level until 1998, when they were relegated back to the Kakkonen. The first team won the Ykkönen Cup in the summer of 1996.

In the autumn of 1998, the club launched a project with the objective of achieving to top-level football for Hämeenlinna. Jari-Pekka Keurulainen was hired as coach, and one of his signings was Ismo Lius. The following season Lius took on additional training responsibilities, and he coached the team during the 2000 season. Then Hannu Touru was hired as coach, and season 2001 ended with celebrations, with the team winning the play-off against in Jaro (from Pietarsaari) by 4–2 on aggregate. Hämeenlinna played in the top-tier Veikkausliiga during 2002–2004.

After the 2012 season, they were relegated to third-tier Kakkonen, and two years later to fourth-tier Kolmonen. Due to severe financial problems, the club declined the league spot, were not granted the league license and were forced to be demoted to the seventh-tier Kutonen for the 2015 season.

== Current squad ==
Note: Flags indicate national team as defined under FIFA eligibility rules; some limited exceptions apply. Players may hold more than one non-FIFA nationality.

No.	Pos.	Nation	Player
1	GK	FIN	Jukka Järvinen
3	DF	FIN	Esa Mattila
4	MF	FIN	Jussi Heikkinen
6	MF	FIN	Lauri Hakanen
7	FW	FIN	Jussi Ojala
8	DF	FIN	Jere Saarinen
9	FW	FIN	Jere Suomalainen
11	DF	FIN	Mikko Matinaro
14	FW	FIN	Aleksi Nieminen
17	MF	FIN	Harri Suhonen
18	GK	FIN	Jaakko Puronaho
19	MF	FIN	Mikko Kalervo

No.	Pos.	Nation	Player
21	MF	FIN	Omid Musawi
23	MF	FIN	Joni Lindroos
24	DF	FIN	Aleksi Topinoja
45	FW	FIN	Aleksi Latvanen
69	MF	FIN	Jarkko Saarman
71	DF	FIN	Miro Purosto
74	DF	FIN	Kaarle Keskitalo
90	GK	FIN	Ville Kalervo
TBA	MF	NGA	Lyam Friday
TBA	MF	CMR	Chijioke Ibekwe
TBA	GK	EST	Sergei Lepmets

== Coaches ==
1991–1995	Seppo Pyykkö
1996–1998	Jorma Kangasmäki
1998	Seppo Pyykkö
1999	Jari-Pekka Keurulainen
2000	Ismo Lius
2001–2002	Hannu Touru
2003–2004	Ville Lyytikäinen
2004	Toni Korkeakunnas
2005	Danny Hoekman
2005	Geert Meijer
2006	Jussi Laihanen
2007–2010	Teuvo Palkki
2011–2012	Jussi Lempinen
2013–	Tomi Uusitorppa
