= Lohjan Pallo =

Finnish football club

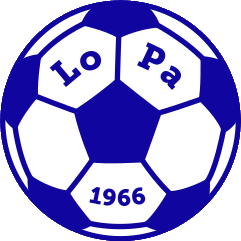
- Full name: Lohjan Pallo
- Nickname(s): LoPa
- Founded: 1966
- Ground: Harjun urheilukenttä, Lohja, Finland
- Chairman: Mikko Koivisto
- Coach: Markus Hänninen
- League: Nelonen
| Home colours | Away colours |

Lohjan Pallo (abbreviated LoPa) is a football club from Lohja, Finland. The club was formed in 1966 and their home ground is at the Harjun urheilukenttä. The men's first team currently plays in the Nelonen (Fourth Division). The chairman is Mikko Koivisto.

== History ==
LoPa were promoted to the Kolmonen in 1976 and the club remained at this level until 1991 when they progressed to the Kakkonen (Second Division), the third tier of the Finnish football system. To date they have played 7 seasons in the Kakkonen over three periods from 1992 to 1994, 2000 and 2007 to the present.

Lohjan Pallo has a strong relationship with the other club from Lohja known as FC Lohja who play in the Vitonen, with the basic concept of sharing the pool of players available to the clubs. In 2009 FC Lohja were relegated from the Nelonen.

== Season to season ==
| Season | Level | Division | Section | Administration | Position | Movements |
|---|---|---|---|---|---|---|
| 2000 | Tier 3 | Kakkonen (Second Division) | South Group | Finnish FA (Suomen Pallolitto) | 12th | Relegated |
| 2001 | Tier 4 | Kolmonen (Third Division) | Section 1 | Helsinki & Uusimaa (SPL Uusimaa) | 2nd | |
| 2002 | Tier 4 | Kolmonen (Third Division) | Section 1 | Helsinki & Uusimaa (SPL Uusimaa) | 7th | |
| 2003 | Tier 4 | Kolmonen (Third Division) | Section 1 | Helsinki & Uusimaa (SPL Uusimaa) | 9th | |
| 2004 | Tier 4 | Kolmonen (Third Division) | Section 1 | Helsinki & Uusimaa (SPL Uusimaa) | 2nd | |
| 2005 | Tier 4 | Kolmonen (Third Division) | Section 1 | Helsinki & Uusimaa (SPL Uusimaa) | 1st | Play-offs |
| 2006 | Tier 4 | Kolmonen (Third Division) | Section 1 | Helsinki & Uusimaa (SPL Uusimaa) | 1st | Promoted |
| 2007 | Tier 3 | Kakkonen (Second Division) | Group B | Finnish FA (Suomen Pallolitto) | 8th | |
| 2008 | Tier 3 | Kakkonen (Second Division) | Group B | Finnish FA (Suomen Pallolitto) | 2nd | |
| 2009 | Tier 3 | Kakkonen (Second Division) | Group B | Finnish FA (Suomen Pallolitto) | 2nd | |
| 2010 | Tier 3 | Kakkonen (Second Division) | Group B | Finnish FA (Suomen Pallolitto) | | |

- 6 seasons in Kakkonen
- 5 seasons in Kolmonen

== Club Structure ==
Lohjan Pallo runs many teams.

The club offers young people the opportunity to develop to their skills at football and also benefit from good teamwork and positive social development. The club's success is based first and foremost on massive voluntary work from club officials, coaches and parents who contribute to a wide range of club activities.

== History: 2010 season ==
LoPa Men's Team are competing in Group B (Lohko B) of the Kakkonen administered by the SPL. This is the third highest tier in the Finnish football system. In 2009 LoPa finished in second place in Section B of the Kakkonen just one point behind the leaders, FC Espoo.

== Current squad ==
Note: Flags indicate national team as defined under FIFA eligibility rules; some limited exceptions apply. Players may hold more than one non-FIFA nationality.

| No. | Pos. | Nation | Player |
|---|---|---|---|
| 1 | GK | FIN | Mikko Kuiro |
| 2 | DF | FIN | Joonas Vikholm |
| 3 | DF | FIN | Mikko Ruokonen |
| 5 | DF | FIN | Matias Majapuro |
| 6 | DF | FIN | Henri Mikkonen |
| 9 | FW | FIN | Mikko Vierimaa |
| 10 | MF | FIN | Daut Kuqi |
| 11 | FW | LBR | Andreas Blamo |
| 12 | GK | FIN | Sebastian Cadenius |
| 14 | MF | FIN | Mika Kieränen |

| No. | Pos. | Nation | Player |
|---|---|---|---|
| 17 | MF | FIN | Tony Lallinaho |
| 19 | MF | FIN | Joni Saastamoinen |
| 20 | DF | FIN | Joni Alho |
| 21 | GK | FIN | Joonas Vellonen |
| 22 | FW | ARG | Nicholas Brain |
| 23 | MF | SLE | Alimamy Jalloh |
| 24 | DF | FIN | Joonas Ahola |
| 26 | MF | FIN | Ville Salminen |
| 29 | DF | FIN | Sami Mikkonen |
| 32 | MF | FIN | Veli-Pekka Nurmi |
