= Someron Voima =

Finnish sports club

- Full name: Someron Voima
- Nickname(s): SoVo
- Founded: 1932; 93 years ago
- Ground: Someron urheilukenttä, Somero; Finland
- Chairman: Timo Rannikko
- Manager: Tommy Lundberg
- League: Kutonen
Home colours	Away colours

Someron Voima (abbreviated SoVo) is a sports club from Somero in Finland. The club was formed in 1932 and their home ground is at the Someron urheilukenttä. The men's football first team currently plays in the Kutonen. The Chairman of SoVo is Timo Rannikko and Henri Hakamäki heads the Football Section.

== Background ==
The club currently has sections covering football, volleyball, floorball, futsal, boxing, handball, athletics and keep-fit. There are also sections for Veterans, Youth and Women for whom various activities are organised.

SoVo has spent many seasons in the lower divisions of the Finnish football league but has been much more successful over the last decade. The club played 3 consecutive seasons in the Kakkonen (Second Division), the third tier of Finnish football from 2005 to 2007 and is now back at that level in 2010 following promotion from the Kolmonen at the end of the 2009 season.

== Season to season ==
Season	Level	Division	Section	Administration	Position	Movements
2003	Tier 5	Nelonen (Fourth Division)		Turku and Åland Islands (SPL Turku)	1st	Promoted
2004	Tier 4	Kolmonen (Third Division)		Turku and Åland Islands (SPL Turku)	1st	Promoted
2005	Tier 3	Kakkonen (Second Division)	West Group	Finnish FA (Suomen Pallolitto)	9th	
2006	Tier 3	Kakkonen (Second Division)	Group B	Finnish FA (Suomen Pallolitto)	11th	
2007	Tier 3	Kakkonen (Second Division)	Group B	Finnish FA (Suomen Pallolitto)	12th	Relegated
2008	Tier 4	Kolmonen (Third Division)		Turku and Åland Islands (SPL Turku)	6th	
2009	Tier 4	Kolmonen (Third Division)		Turku and Åland Islands (SPL Turku)	1st	Promoted
2010	Tier 3	Kakkonen (Second Division)	Group B	Finnish FA (Suomen Pallolitto)		

- 4 seasons in Kakkonen
- 3 seasons in Kolmonen
- 1 season in Nelonen

== Club Structure ==
SoVo currently has 1 men's team, 1 woman's team, 4 boys teams and 2 girls teams.

== 2010 season ==
SoVo Men's Team are competing in Group B (Lohko B) of the Kakkonen administered by the Football Association of Finland (Suomen Palloliitto) . This is the third highest tier in the Finnish football system. In 2009 Someron Voima finished in first position in their Kolmonen (Third Division) section and were promoted to the Kakkonen..

SoVo/2 are participating in Section 2 (Lohko 2) of the Kutonen administered by the Turku SPL.

== References and sources ==
- Official Website
- Finnish Wikipedia
- Suomen Cup
