= Castrén (stadium) =

Football stadium in Oulu, Finland

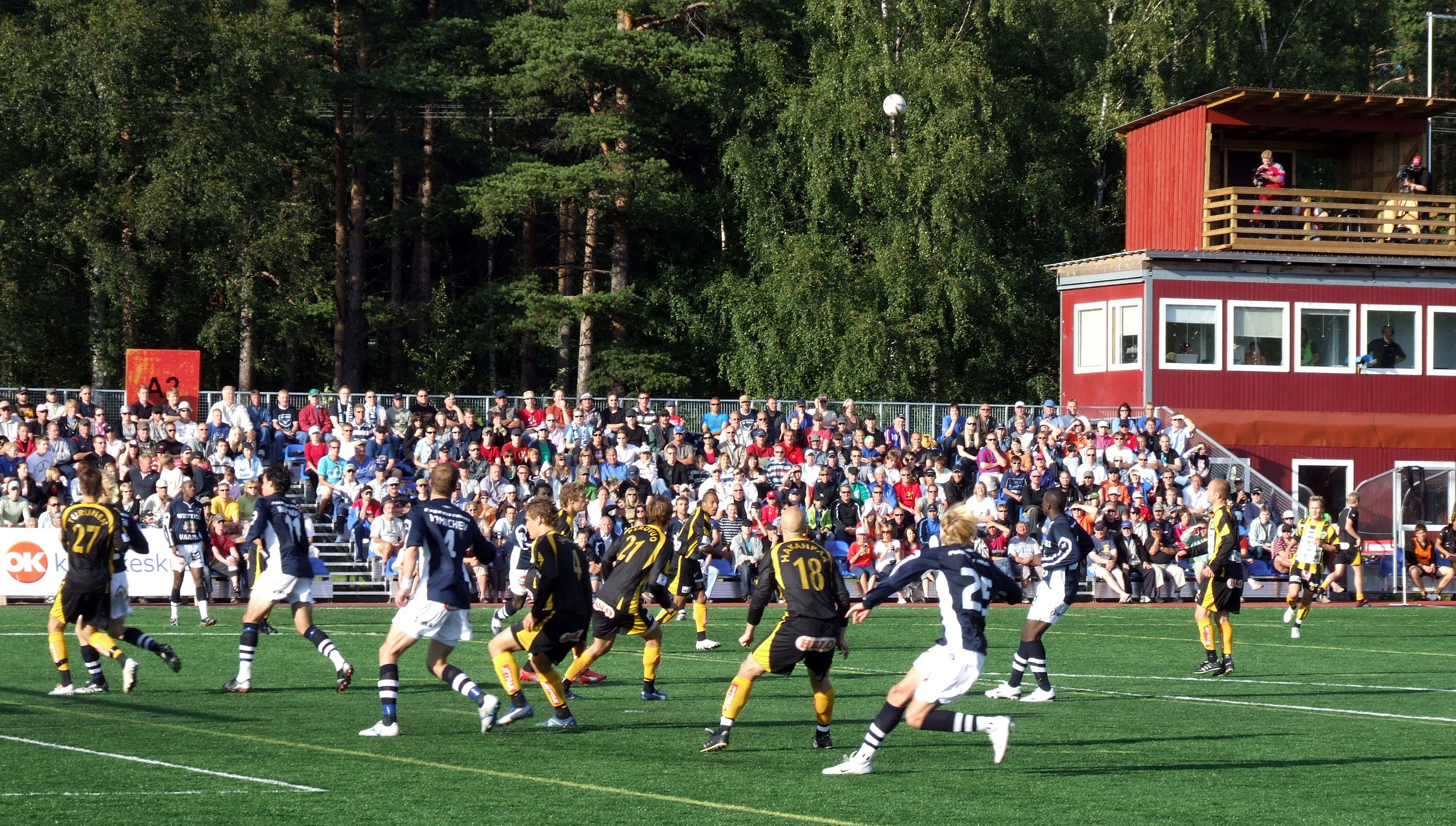
- Interactive map of Castrén
- Location: Oulu, Finland
- Coordinates: 65°01′49″N 25°29′42″E
- Owner: City of Oulu
- Capacity: 4 000
- Field size: 110 × 78 m

Castrén is a football stadium in the Välivainio neighbourhood of Oulu, Finland. The stadium holds 4 000 spectators. It is the current home ground of sports clubs Oulun Luistinseura, JS Hercules and Oulun Palloseura. It served as the home stadium of Veikkausliiga club AC Oulu between 2003 and 2010.
