= PK-35 Vantaa (men) =

Former Finnish football team

- Full name: PK-35 Vantaa
- Founded: as Viipurin Pallokerho, 1935 as Pallokerho-35, 1948 as PK-35 Vantaa, 2008
- Dissolved: 2016
- Ground: Myyrmäen jalkapallostadion Vantaa
- Capacity: 4,700
- Coordinates: 60°15.726′N 24°50.291′E
- Chairman: Markku Hynninen
- 2016: Veikkausliiga, 12th (relegation and bankruptcy)
colours	colours

PK-35 Vantaa (previously Pallokerho-35 or PK-35) was a Finnish men's football team, based in Vantaa. It last played in the Veikkausliiga, the top-tier men's football league in Finland. The team was based at the Myyrmäen jalkapallostadion in the Myyrmäki district of Vantaa at the time of its dissolution, after the 2016 season.

The Helsinki-based PK-35 is the club's first team and currently competes in the new second-tier Ykkösliiga, starting in 2024.

== History ==
PK-35 was founded in Vyborg in 1935. After the Finnish Winter War and Second World War, PK-35 was refounded in Helsinki in 1948. When PK-35 was coached by Pasi Rautiainen in the mid-1990s they were promoted to Finland's top division, the Veikkausliiga. After some economic troubles, the club's top representative team was acquired by Hjallis Harkimo and renamed FC Jokerit. The PK-35 club, however, continued with the other teams in lower divisions using its original name. PK-35 was promoted to Kakkonen in 2001 and to Ykkönen in 2005.

=== Move to Vantaa ===
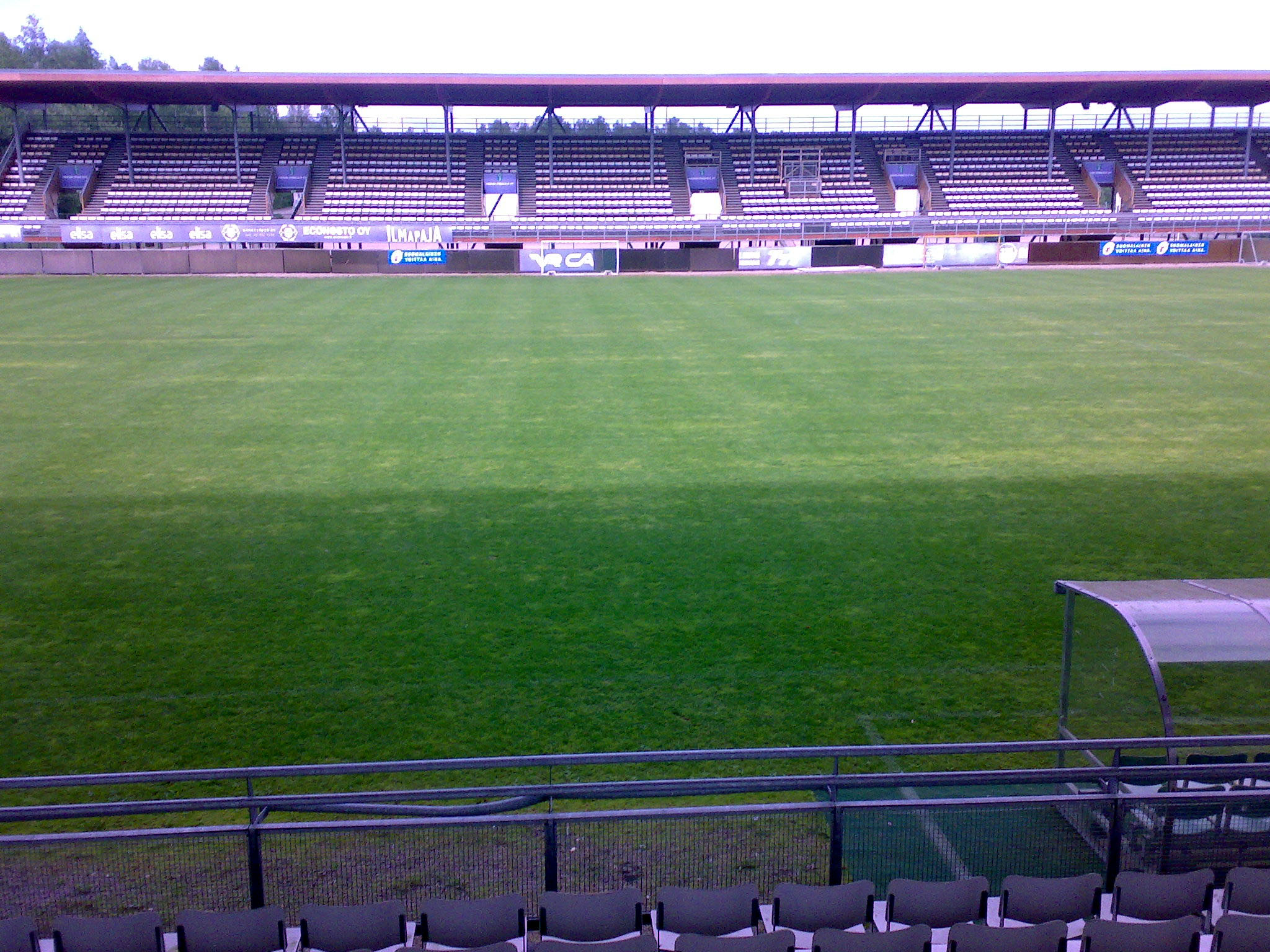
The team's home ground was Myyrmäki stadion

After the 2008 season Pallokerho-35 decided to move its men's and women's first teams to the commuter town of Vantaa, where they played at ISS Stadion in Myyrmäki. The teams were run by a newly created association and competed with the name PK-35 Vantaa. Pallokerho-35 and its other teams (juniors) stayed in Helsinki under the association PK-35 ry (main club).

=== Bankruptcy ===
The club suffered serious financial problems in its final years. Sitting at the bottom of the 2016 Veikkausliiga, the club were docked six points and manager Shefki Kuqi left to join Inter Turku.

The club was relegated at the end of the season but did not apply for a licence to play in the 2017 Ykkönen and ceased operations. The club's name continued, however, as the club that split from the PK-35 organisation when it was renamed FC Jokerit began to play in the Helsinki area Kolmonen division (4th tier).

== Season to season ==
Season	Level	Division	Section	Administration	Position	Finnish Cup	Movements
2009	Tier 2	Ykkönen		Finnish FA	9th	6th Round	
2010	Tier 2	Ykkönen		Finnish FA	8th	5th Round	
2011	Tier 2	Ykkönen		Finnish FA	4th	4th Round	
2012	Tier 2	Ykkönen		Finnish FA	4th	4th Round	
2013	Tier 2	Ykkönen		Finnish FA	6th	5th Round	
2014	Tier 2	Ykkönen		Finnish FA	6th	3rd Round	
2015	Tier 2	Ykkönen		Finnish FA	2nd	6th Round	Promoted to 2016 Veikkausliiga
2016	Tier 1	Veikkausliiga		Finnish FA	12th		Relegated/Dissolved

=== Management ===
As of 2 August 2016.

Name	Role
(Finland) Pasi Pihamaa	Head Coach
(Finland) Juha Jussila	Coach
(Finland) Ville Vepsäläinen	Kit Manager, Physiotherapist
(Finland) Teemu Savukoski	Kit Manager
(Finland) Boris Wistuba	Team Manager

== See also ==
- FC Jokerit
