= Atlantis FC =

Finnish football club

- Full name: Atlantis Football Club
- Founded: 1995; 31 years ago
- Ground: Töölön Pallokenttä, Helsinki
- Capacity: 4,000
- Chairman: Markku Ritala
- Coach: Abdulaziz Moshood Bola
- League: Kakkonen
- 2026: Kakkonen Group A, 3rd of 10
Home colours	Away colours

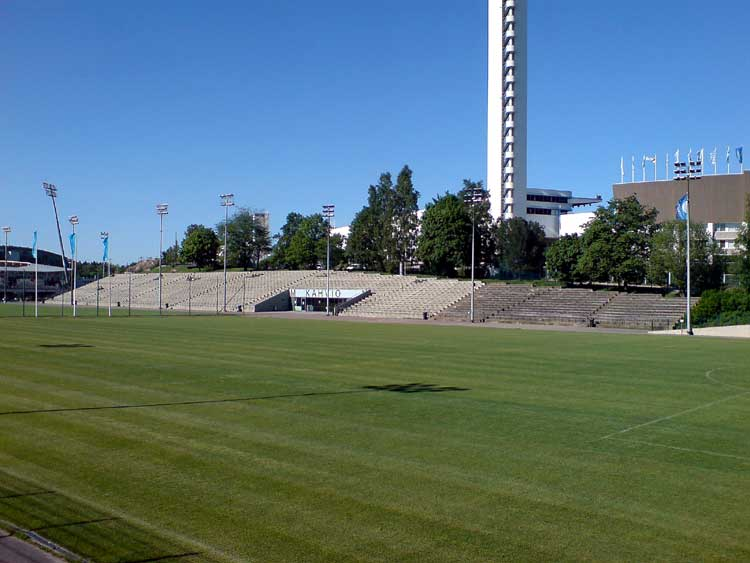
Töölön Pallokenttä

Atlantis FC is a Finnish football club, based in Helsinki. It currently plays in the third tier of Finnish football (Ykkönen).

== History ==
The club was founded in late 1995 when Johanneksen Dynamo (founded 1980) and FC Norssi (founded 1985) merged. The name "Atlantis FC" was created by Gösta Sundqvist, singer of Leevi and the Leavings.

The team began to play in the third tier of Finnish football (the Kakkonen) in 1996 and in 1997 they were promoted to the Ykkönen. In 1999 the club reached the playoffs for promotion to the first tier (Veikkausliiga, or betting league in English, named for its sponsor) but lost to Vaasan Palloseura. The following year they achieved promotion to the Veikkausliiga. In 2001 Atlantis finished seventh in the league and won the Finnish Cup.

The club fell into financial difficulties and went bankrupt 2002 and their place in the Premier League was given to AC Allianssi. The club's reserve team, Atlantis Akatemia (Atlantis Academy), still continued in the second division. 2003 it changed its name to Atlantis FC and in 2004 the club was promoted to the Ykkönen.

Atlantis' current manager is Markku Ritala and they play their home matches at Helsingin Pallokenttä. Sakari Tukiainen finished the season 2014 as the top goal scorer and setting a new league record with 40 goals for the Kakkonen.

== Current squad ==
Note: Flags indicate national team as defined under FIFA eligibility rules; some limited exceptions apply. Players may hold more than one non-FIFA nationality.

No.	Pos.	Nation	Player
2	DF	CHI	Sebastian Jara
3	DF	FIN	Miika Ekmark
4	MF	BRA	Diego Martins
6	DF	ALG	Med Bekhedda
7	MF	CIV	Konan Kouakou
8	MF	SLE	Abdul Sesay
11	FW	FIN	Nico Weckström
14	FW	FIN	Stephen Obeng
16	DF	KOS	Vyrtyt Rexhepi
17	FW	FIN	John Digha
18	FW	FIN	Faton Ruka
19	DF	FIN	Santeri Saarenpää
20	MF	FIN	Kyawsan 'Jose' Chit
22	MF	BRA	Andre Dos Santos
24	MF	SOM	Fahad Mohamed
25	DF	FIN	Albert Uljala
25	MF	FIN	Zakarie Ali
27	MF	FIN	Dmitro Platonenko

No.	Pos.	Nation	Player
28	DF	FIN	Aleksandr Rozov
29	MF	FIN	Ero Virolainen
30	FW	SLE	Obi Metzger
31	MF	FIN	Ikpo Ondo Clyde
32	MF	FIN	Ibraham Aweys
33	FW	FIN	Juuso Leimu
34	MF	FIN	Jami Pietikäinen
35	DF	FIN	Joona Sneitz
36	FW	SEN	Bachir Mboup
37	DF	NCA	Armando Pongo
38	MF	FIN	Ibrahim Haji
39	FW	FIN	Juhana Nousiainen
40	MF	PER	Gonzalo Oroza
92	GK	FIN	Eemeli Lohvansuu
95	GK	FIN	Tomas Turunen
97	GK	FIN	Joni Lahtinen
99	GK	FIN	Joonatan Vuorela
99	GK	PER	Lucas Pereyra

=== Staff ===
==== Management ====
- Chairman: (Finland) Markku Ritala
- General Manager: (Finland) Aarne Tenkanen
- Director of Academy: (Finland) Janne Wikman

==== Sports ====
- Head Coach: (Finland) Abdulaziz Moshood Bola
- Goalkeeper Coach: (Senegal) Mamadou Vito Diatta
- Technical Coach: (Nigeria) Sunny Akintmehin

==== Medical ====
- Masseur: (Finland) Jukka Ala-Nikkola
- Kit manager: (Nigeria) Christopher Aruna
- Physio: (Finland) Filip Lunabba

=== Retired numbers ===
Note: Flags indicate national team as defined under FIFA eligibility rules; some limited exceptions apply. Players may hold more than one non-FIFA nationality.

No.	Pos.	Nation	Player
1	GK	FIN	Miki Lehtonen (posthumous honour)

== Seasons ==
Season to season of Atlantis
- 1 seasons in Veikkausliiga
- 8 seasons in second tier
- 17 seasons in third tier
- 3 seasons in fourth tier

Season	Level	Division	Section	Administration	Position	Movements
1996	Tier 3	Kakkonen (Second Division)	South Group	Finnish FA (Suomen Palloliitto)	3rd	
1997	Tier 3	Kakkonen (Second Division)	South Group	Finnish FA (Suomen Palloliitto)	1st	Promoted
1998	Tier 2	Ykkönen (First Division)	South Group	Finnish FA (Suomen Palloliitto)	5th	Promotion Group 10th
1999	Tier 2	Ykkönen (First Division)	South Group	Finnish FA (Suomen Palloliitto)	2nd	Promotion Group 2nd - Promotion Playoff
2000	Tier 2	Ykkönen (First Division)	South Group	Finnish FA (Suomen Palloliitto)	4th	Promotion Group 2nd - Promotion Playoff - Promoted
2001	Tier 1	Veikkausliiga (Premier Division)		Finnish FA (Suomen Palloliitto)	7th	
2002						Bankruptcy - league spot given to AC Allianssi
2003	Tier 3	Kakkonen (Second Division)	South Group	Finnish FA (Suomen Palloliitto)	3rd	Academy team continued as Atlantis
2004	Tier 3	Kakkonen (Second Division)	Southern Group	Finnish FA (Suomen Palloliitto)	1st	Promotion Playoff - Promoted
2005	Tier 2	Ykkönen (First Division)		Finnish FA (Suomen Palloliitto)	7th	
2006	Tier 2	Ykkönen (First Division)		Finnish FA (Suomen Palloliitto)	3rd	
2007	Tier 2	Ykkönen (First Division)		Finnish FA (Suomen Palloliitto)	7th	
2008	Tier 2	Ykkönen (First Division)		Finnish FA (Suomen Palloliitto)	11th	
2009	Tier 2	Ykkönen (First Division)		Finnish FA (Suomen Palloliitto)	13th	Relegated
2010	Tier 3	Kakkonen (Second Division)	Group A	Finnish FA (Suomen Palloliitto)	6th	
2011	Tier 3	Kakkonen (Second Division)	Group A	Finnish FA (Suomen Palloliitto)	8th	
2012	Tier 3	Kakkonen (Second Division)	Eastern Group	Finnish FA (Suomen Palloliitto)	5th	
2013	Tier 3	Kakkonen (Second Division)	Eastern Group	Finnish FA (Suomen Palloliitto)	3rd	
2014	Tier 3	Kakkonen (Second Division)	Eastern Group	Finnish FA (Suomen Palloliitto)	1st	Promotion Playoff
2015	Tier 3	Kakkonen (Second Division)	Southern Group	Finnish FA (Suomen Palloliitto)	7th	
2016	Tier 3	Kakkonen (Second Division)	Group B	Finnish FA (Suomen Palloliitto)	11th	Relegated
2017	Tier 4	Kolmonen (Third Division)	Helsinki & Uusimaa Group 1	Helsinki & Uusimaa (SPL Helsinki)	3rd	
2018	Tier 4	Kolmonen (Third Division)	Helsinki & Uusimaa Group 3	Helsinki & Uusimaa (SPL Helsinki)	2nd	
2019	Tier 4	Kolmonen (Third Division)	Helsinki & Uusimaa Group 1	Helsinki & Uusimaa (SPL Helsinki)	1st	Promoted
2020	Tier 3	Kakkonen (Second Division)	Group B	Finnish FA (Suomen Palloliitto)	5th	
2021	Tier 3	Kakkonen (Second Division)	Group A	Finnish FA (Suomen Palloliitto)	3rd	
2022	Tier 3	Kakkonen (Second Division)	Group A	Finnish FA (Suomen Palloliitto)	5th	
2023	Tier 3	Kakkonen (Second Division)	Group B	Finnish FA (Suomen Palloliitto)	4th	Playoff to third tier - remained in new nation wide third tier
2024	Tier 3	Ykkönen (First Division)		Finnish FA (Suomen Palloliitto)	4th	
2025	Tier 3	Ykkönen (First Division)		Finnish FA (Suomen Palloliitto)		

== Former coaches ==
- 1980–1983: Juha Leinonen
- 1984–1986: Hannu Ylöstalo
- 1987: Hannu Tuukkanen
- 1988–1989: Mikko Viitamäki
- 1990–1991: Jari Kurittu
- 1992–1993: Mikko Viitamäki
- 1994: Esko Kokkonen
- 1995: Ari Tiittanen
- 1996–2000: Jari Europaeus
- 2000: Markku Palmroos
- 2001: Ari Tiittanen
- 2002: Timo Askolin
- 2003–2007: Pasi Pihamaa
- 2007: Ville Lyytikäinen
- 2008: (Egypt) Abdou Talat
- 2008: Pasi Pihamaa
- 2009: (Estonia) Aavo Sarap
- 2010: (Nigeria) Moshood Bola Abdulaziz
- 2011: Mikko Lappalainen & Unto Virkkala
- 2012: Unto Virkkala & (Brazil) Alan Arruda
- 2013: Mikko Lappalainen
- 2014: (Brazil) Alan Arruda
- 2015: Ari Asukka
- 2016: Markku Palmroos & Tom Weckström
- 2017: (Brazil) Alan Arruda
- 2018: (Nigeria) Abdulaziz Moshood Bola

== Player of the year ==
- 1996: Marko Ignatius
- 1997: Esa Pamppunen
- 1998: Kimmo Tauriainen
- 1999: Tero Pilvi
- 2000: Pasi Solehmainen
- 2001: Sami Ylä-Jussila
- 2002: Mika Johansson
- 2003: Henri Kokkonen
- 2004: Juha Jussila
- 2005: Risto Salmi
- 2006: Adel Eid
- 2007: Risto Salmi
- 2008: Ernest Simon
- 2009: Tomas Sirevicius
- 2010: Alan Arruda
- 2011: Alimamy Jalloh
- 2012: Mohamed Fofana
- 2013: Alimamy Jalloh
- 2014: Jussi Äijälä
- 2015: Pierre Nlate
- 2016: Pierre Nlate

== Topscorer ==
- 1980: Kari Nevala (9)
- 1981: Kari Nevala (8)
- 1982: Hannu Vallius (12)
- 1983: Kari Nevala (12)
- 1984: Kari Nevala (22)
- 1985: Kari Nevala (14)
- 1986: Kari Nevala (11)
- 1987: Jukka Innanen (10)
- 1988: Jorma Lempinen (12)
- 1989: Jorma Lempinen (12)
- 1990: Kari Nevala (10)
- 1991: Jouko Mikkonen & Henri Taavitsainen (7)
- 1992: Esa Pamppunen (28)
- 1993: Esa Pamppunen (17)
- 1994: Esa Pamppunen (17)
- 1995: Esa Pamppunen (19)
- 1996: Esa Pamppunen (12)
- 1997: Jani Nieminen & Esa Pamppunen (10)
- 1998: Kimmo Tauriainen (8)
- 1999: Tero Pilvi (9)
- 2000: Sukru Uzuner (19)
- 2001: Sami Ylä-Jussila (12)
- 2002: Eero Voipio (8)
- 2003: Eero Voipio (7)
- 2004: Eero Voipio (12)
- 2005: Vesa Kosonen (13)
- 2006: Feras Abid ja Petteri Paajanen(11)
- 2007: Muwahid Sesay (9)
- 2008: Kalle Vasse (7)
- 2009: Zakaria Kibona (6)
- 2010: Bobo Bola (11)
- 2011: Victor Solomon (14)
- 2012: Victor Solomon & Abdul Sesay (12)
- 2013: Misse Eboungue (16)
- 2014: Sakari Tukiainen (41)
- 2015: Samuel Chidi (7)
- 2016: Shaggy Kimuenimeso & Juuso Leimu (4)

== Highest Attendances by season ==
- 1996: 17 August 1996 Atlantis FC – PK-35 228
- 1997: 13 September 1997 Atlantis FC – EIF 213
- 1998: 16 June 1998 Atlantis FC – FC Lahti 427
- 1999: 14 October 1999 Atlantis FC – Tampere United 1.243
- 2000: 30 September 2000 Atlantis FC – KuPS 1.768
- 2001: 4 May 2001 Atlantis FC – FC Haka 2.797
- 2002: 11 July 2002 Atlantis FC – Exeter City 325
- 2003: 1 July 2003 Atlantis FC – FCK Salamat 358
- 2004: 26 September 2004 Atlantis FC – JIPPO 512
- 2005: 2 August 2005 Atlantis FC – PK-35 746
- 2006: 2 September 2006 Atlantis FC – TP-47 742
- 2007: 23 September 2007 Atlantis FC – KuPS 722
- 2008: 11 October 2008 Atlantis FC – JJK 835
- 2009: 3 May 2009 Atlantis FC – PoPa 623
- 2010: 23 July 2010 Atlantis FC – HIFK 289
- 2011: 10 May 2011 Atlantis FC – Pallohonka 241
- 2012: 25 April 2012 Atlantis FC – FC Honka 312
- 2013: 21 May 2013 Atlantis FC – KTP 215
- 2014: 18 October 2014 Atlantis FC – EIF 932
- 2015: 3 August 2015 Atlantis FC – FC Honka 327

== Former Chairmen ==
Erkki Alaja
