= ASD Giorgione 1911 =

Italian football club

Giorgione
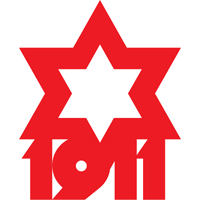
- Full name: Associazione Sportiva Dilettantistica Giorgione 1911
- Founded: 1911; 2000 (refounded)
- Ground: Stadio Comunale; Castelfranco Veneto, Italy
- Capacity: 2,100
- Chairman: Antonello Orfeo
- Manager: Marco Fabbian
- League: Eccellenza Veneto
- 2022–23: Eccellenza Veneto; Group B, 12th of 19
Home colours	Away colours

Associazione Sportiva Dilettantistica Giorgione 1911 or simply Giorgione is an Italian association football club, based in Castelfranco Veneto, Veneto. Giorgione currently plays in Eccellenza.

== History ==
=== Unione Sportiva Giorgione ===
It was founded in 1911

The team served in the 1920s in the Seconda categoria (the second level of Italian football at the time) and more recently, in the 1990s, in Serie C2, reaching its highest point in the season, 1996–97 when he came 5th and lost the playoff semi-final for the promotion in Serie C1.

It was declared bankrupt in 2000 by the Court of Treviso.

=== After the bankruptcy ===
The current team, although founded in 2000, takes the coat and placed the results of U.S. Giorgione.

In the season 2010–11 the team was promoted from Eccellenza Veneto to Serie D

== Colors and badge ==
The team's color is red

The badge is a red star with six points

== Recent chronology ==
- Serie C2 1985–1986 – 14th in Girone B with 32 points
- Serie C2 1986–1987 – 8th in Girone B with 36 points
- Serie C2 1987–1988 – 10th in Girone B with 31 points
- Serie C2 1988–1989 – 18th in Girone B with 22 points (Relegated)
- Interregionale 1989–1990 – 9th in Girone D with 34 points
- Interregionale 1990–1991 – 1st in Girone E with 51 points (lost promotion play-offs)
- Interregionale 1991–1992 – 1st in Girone B with 49 points (Promoted)
- Serie C2 1992–1993 – 7th in Girone A with 37 points
- Serie C2 1993–1994 – 14th in Girone A with 37 points
- Serie C2 1994–1995 – 14th in Girone B with 39 points (Relegated via playout-Repechage)
- Serie C2 1995–1996 – 9th in Girone B with 45 points
- Serie C2 1996–1997 – 5th in Girone B with 47 points (lost promotion play-offs)
- Serie C2 1997–1998 – 14th in Girone A with 38 points (saved via playout)
- Serie C2 1998–1999 – 11th in Girone B with 42 points
- Serie C2 1999–2000 – 17th in Girone B with 34 points (Relegated) Bankrupt
- Terza Categoria 2000–2001 – 1st (Promoted)
- Seconda Categoria 2001–2002 – 1st (Promoted)
- Prima Categoria 2002–2003 – ?
- Prima Categoria 2003–2004 – ?
- Prima Categoria 2004–2005 – 1st with 71 points (Promoted)
- Promozione Veneto 2005–2006 – 7th in Girone B with 41 points
- Promozione Veneto 2006–2007 – 2nd in Girone B with 58 points (Promoted via playoff)
- Eccellenza Veneto 2007–2008 – 5th in Girone B with 49 points
- Eccellenza Veneto 2008–2009 – 8th in Girone B with 38 points
- Eccellenza Veneto 2009–2010 – 6th in Girone B with 44 points
- Eccellenza Veneto 2010–2011 – 2nd in Girone B with 55 points (Promoted by playoff)
- 2011–12 Serie D – 10th in Girone C with 44 points
- 2012–13 Serie D – 17th in Girone C with 39 points
- 2013–14 Serie D – in Girone C with points
