= Janne Mäkelä =

Finnish footballer (born 1971)

Personal information
- Full name: Janne-Pekka Mäkelä
- Date of birth: 23 July 1971 (age 55)
- Place of birth: Tampere, Finland
- Height: 1.77 m (5 ft 9 1/2 in)
- Position: Defender

Youth career
- –1989: PP-70

Senior career*
Years	Team	Apps	(Gls)
1990–1991	Ilves	53	(2)
1992–1994	MYPA	82	(2)
1995–1996	St Mirren	1	(0)
1995–1996	FinnPa	33	(0)
1996–1997	Raith Rovers	8	(2)
1997	Jazz	7	(0)
1998–1999	Haka	33	(0)
2000	TPV	15	(3)
2001	Lahti	6	(0)
2001	Haka	6	(1)
Total		244	(9)

International career
1994–1997	Finland	20	(0)
- * Club domestic league appearances and goals

Janne-Pekka Mäkelä (born 23 July 1971) is a Finnish former footballer.

Mäkelä played 12 seasons in the Finnish premier division Veikkausliiga. 1996–1997 he played 8 matches for Raith Rovers in the Scottish Football League. Mäkelä capped 20 times for the Finland national team.

== Career statistics ==
=== Club ===
Appearances and goals by club, season and competition
Club	Season	League			Europe		Total	
Club	Season	Division	Apps	Goals	Apps	Goals	Apps	Goals
Ilves	1990	Veikkausliiga	20	2	–		20	2
Ilves	1991	Veikkausliiga	33	0	4 (Note: Appearances in UEFA Cup Winners' Cup)	0	37	0
Ilves	Total		53	2	4	0	57	2
MYPA	1992	Veikkausliiga	32	2	–		32	2
MYPA	1993	Veikkausliiga	28	0	2	0	30	0
MYPA	1994	Veikkausliiga	22	0	3 (Note: Appearances in UEFA Cup)	0	25	0
MYPA	Total		82	2	5	0	87	2
St Mirren	1995–96	Scottish First Division	1	0	–		1	0
FinnPa	1995	Veikkausliiga	23	0	–		23	0
FinnPa	1996	Veikkausliiga	10	0	–		10	0
FinnPa	Total		33	0	0	0	33	0
Raith Rovers	1996–97	Scottish Premier Division	8	1	–		8	1
Jazz	1997	Veikkausliiga	7	0	4 (Note: Appearances in UEFA Champions League and UEFA Cup)	0	11	0
Haka	1998	Veikkausliiga	25	0	4	0	29	0
Haka	1999	Veikkausliiga	8	0	–		8	0
Haka	Total		33	0	4	0	37	0
TPV	2000	Ykkönen	15	3	–		15	3
Lahti	2001	Veikkausliiga	6	0	–		6	0
Haka	2001	Veikkausliiga	6	1	2 (Note: Appearances in UEFA Champions League)	0	8	1
Career total			244	7	19	0	263	7

=== International ===
As of 30 April 1997

Appearances and goals by national team and year
National team	Year	Apps	Goals
Finland	1994	12	0
Finland	1995	6	0
Finland	1996	0	0
Finland	1997	2	0
Total		20	0

== Honours ==
Haka

- Veikkausliiga (2): 1998, 1999

Ilves

- Finnish Cup: 1990
