= 2014 Ykkönen =

Ykkönen
- Season: 2014
- Champions: HIFK
- Promoted: HIFK; KTP; Ilves
- Relegated: JIPPO; FC Viikingit
- Matches: 135
- Goals: 415 (3.07 per match)
- Top goalscorer: Kalle Multanen (30 goals)
- Biggest home win: Ilves 10–0 FC Viikingit (4 October)
- Biggest away win: FC Jazz 0–5 HIFK (3 August)
- Highest scoring: Ilves 10–0 FC Viikingit (4 October)

The 2014 Ykkönen began on 27 April 2014 and ended on 4 October 2014. The winning team was directly promoted to the 2015 Veikkausliiga. The bottom two teams were relegated to Kakkonen.

== Overview ==
Location of teams in Ykkönen 2013

A total of ten teams will contest in the league, including seven sides from the 2013 season, JJK who was relegated from Veikkausliiga and FC Jazz and HIFK who promoted from Kakkonen after winning the promotion play-offs.

AC Kajaani and OPS were relegated from 2013 Ykkönen. SJK was promoted to the 2014 Veikkausliiga.

Club	Location	Stadium	Capacity	Manager
AC Oulu	Oulu	Raatin Stadion	6,996	(Finland) Rauno Ojanen
FC Jazz	Pori	Porin Stadion	12,000	(Finland) Jani Uotinen
FC Viikingit	Helsinki	Vuosaaren urheilukenttä	4,200	(Finland) Mika Sandberg
Haka	Valkeakoski	Tehtaan kenttä	3,516	(Finland) Juho Rantala
HIFK	Helsinki	Töölön pallokenttä	4,000	(Finland) Jani Honkavaara
Ilves	Tampere	Tammela Stadion	5,040	(Finland) Mika Malinen
JIPPO	Joensuu	Joensuun keskuskenttä	3,000	(Finland) Mika Lähderinne
JJK	Jyväskylä	Harjun stadion	3,000	(Finland) Juha Pasoja
KTP	Kotka	Arto Tolsa Areena	4,780	(Finland) Sami Ristilä
PK-35 Vantaa	Vantaa	ISS Stadion	4,500	(Finland) Jari Europaeus

=== Managerial changes ===
Team	Outgoing manager	Manner of departure	Date of vacancy	Incoming manager	Date of appointment	Table
PK-35 Vantaa	(Finland) Ilir Zeneli	End of contract	n/a	(Finland) Jari Europaeus	5 November 2013	Pre-season
JIPPO	(Finland) Jarmo Korhonen	End of contract	n/a	(Finland) Mika Lähderinne	20 November 2013	Pre-season
FC Jazz	(Finland) Matti Santahuhta	End of contract	n/a	(Finland) Jouni Joensuu	23 December 2013	Pre-season
FC Viikingit	(Finland) Ilkka Jäntti	Mutual termination	26 May 2014	(Finland) Mika Sandberg	26 May 2014	10th
FC Jazz	(Finland) Jouni Joensuu	Mutual termination	4 August 2014	(Finland) Jani Uotinen	4 August 2014	9th

== League table ==
Pos	Team	Pld	W	D	L	GF	GA	GD	Pts	Promotion or relegation
1	HIFK (C, P)	27	15	5	7	63	30	+33	50	Promotion to Veikkausliiga
2	KTP (Note: KTP were promoted after FC Honka failed to obtain a licence) (P)	27	15	5	7	57	33	+24	50	Promotion to Veikkausliiga
3	Ilves (Note: Ilves were promoted after MyPa failed to obtain a licence) (P)	27	14	5	8	45	29	+16	47	Promotion to Veikkausliiga
4	AC Oulu	27	13	8	6	46	32	+14	47	
5	Haka	27	13	7	7	55	32	+23	46	
6	PK-35 Vantaa	27	12	10	5	40	28	+12	46	
7	JJK	27	11	5	11	40	46	−6	38	
8	FC Jazz	27	6	7	14	31	48	−17	25	
9	JIPPO (R)	27	5	5	17	19	56	−37	20	Relegation to Kakkonen
10	FC Viikingit (R)	27	1	3	23	19	81	−62	6	Relegation to Kakkonen

Source: palloverkko.palloliitto.fi
Rules for classification: 1) points; 2) goal difference; 3) number of goals scored.
(C) Champions; (P) Promoted; (R) Relegated

== Results ==
=== Matches 1–18 ===
Home \ Away	ACO	JAZ	VII	HAK	HIFK	ILV	JIP	JJK	KTP	PKV
AC Oulu		2–1	2–1	0–0	2–2	0–1	3–0	3–1	4–4	1–1
FC Jazz	0–1		3–3	2–2	0–5	0–0	0–1	1–1	0–1	0–2
FC Viikingit	0–2	1–4		1–3	3–0	1–2	0–1	2–3	0–4	0–2
Haka	0–0	3–3	5–0		1–4	4–1	5–0	2–0	3–1	0–1
HIFK	4–0	3–0	3–1	2–1		2–0	4–0	1–2	4–1	1–1
Ilves	0–1	3–0	2–1	2–1	0–0		2–0	4–1	3–3	0–2
JIPPO	2–1	0–1	1–0	1–4	0–3	0–2		2–3	1–4	1–1
JJK	3–0	1–0	0–0	0–3	0–4	2–2	3–0		2–1	0–2
KTP	2–1	4–1	4–0	3–0	2–0	1–0	3–0	3–1		2–1
PK-35 Vantaa	3–0	1–1	5–2	1–2	2–2	2–1	0–0	1–0	2–2	

Source: palloverkko.palloliitto.fi
Legend: Blue = home team win; Yellow = draw; Red = away team win.

=== Matches 19–27 ===
Home \ Away	ACO	JAZ	VII	HAK	HIFK	ILV	JIP	JJK	KTP	PKV
AC Oulu		1–1	7–0		2–1	4–1			1–1	
FC Jazz				0–2		0–1			2–0	1–3
FC Viikingit		1–2			0–3				0–3	0–0
Haka	2–4		2–0		1–0			2–2		6–0
HIFK		4–2				2–3	4–2			1–1
Ilves			10–0	0–0			1–0	1–2	2–0	
JIPPO	0–0	1–3	4–2	1–1						
JJK	1–2	1–3	4–0		0–4		4–1			
KTP				3–0	3–0		0–0	1–2		1–3
PK-35 Vantaa	0–2					0–1	2–0	1–1		

Source: palloverkko.palloliitto.fi
Legend: Blue = home team win; Yellow = draw; Red = away team win.

== Statistics ==
=== Top scorers ===
Source: palloverkko.palloliitto.fi

Rank	Player	Club	Goals
1	(Finland) Kalle Multanen	Haka	30
2	(Finland) Jussi Aalto	KTP	25
3	(Cyprus) Alekos Alekou	FC Jazz	14
3	(Finland) Jonne Hjelm	Ilves	14
5	(Finland) Samuli Kaivonurmi	KTP	12
5	(Finland) Eero Peltonen	HIFK	12
7	(Finland) Dritan Stafsula	AC Oulu	11
8	(Finland) Antto Hilska	JJK	10
8	(Finland) Fidan Seferi	FC Viikingit / PK-35 Vantaa	10
10	(Finland) Antonio Inutile	HIFK	8
10	(Finland) Joni Korhonen	PK-35 Vantaa	8
10	(Finland) Joni Mäkelä	KTP	8
10	(Finland) Tuomas Mustonen	HIFK	8
10	(Finland) Esa Terävä	HIFK	8

== Monthly awards ==
Month	Player of the Month
May	(Finland) Jussi Aalto (KTP)
June	(Finland) Jussi Aalto (KTP)
July	(Finland) Mikko Manninen (JJK)
August	(Finland) Mika Nurmela (AC Oulu)
September	(Finland) Kalle Multanen (Haka)

== See also ==
- 2014 Veikkausliiga
- 2014 Kakkonen
