= Antti Sumiala =

Finnish footballer (born 1974)

Personal information
- Full name: Antti Markus Sumiala
- Date of birth: 20 February 1974 (age 52)
- Place of birth: Pori, Finland
- Height: 1.84 m (6 ft 1/2 in)
- Position: Forward

Youth career
- PPT
- Anderlecht

Senior career*
| Years | Team | Apps | (Gls) |
| 1989–1991 | PPT | 24 | (7) |
| 1992 | Ikast | | |
| 1993 | Jazz | 29 | (20) |
| 1994 | Ikast | 14 | (4) |
| 1994–1995 | Emmen | 17 | (9) |
| 1995–1997 | NEC Nijmegen | 66 | (17) |
| 1997–1999 | Twente | 32 | (6) |
| 1999–2000 | Jokerit | 52 | (16) |
| 2000–2001 | SSV Reutlingen | 13 | (2) |
| 2001 | Jazz | 14 | (8) |
| 2001–2002 | Yimpaş Yozgatspor | 15 | (6) |
| 2002–2003 | IFK Norrköping | 33 | (20) |
| 2003–2004 | Akçaabat Sebatspor | 13 | (1) |
| 2004–2005 | Vaduz | 27 | (9) |
| 2005 | Kansas City Wizards | 2 | (0) |
| 2006–2010 | PoPa | 100 | (54) |
| 2010 | MuSa | 1 | (0) |
| Total | | 452 | (179) |

International career
| 1992–2004 | Finland | 38 | (9) |
- * Club domestic league appearances and goals

Antti Markus Sumiala (born 20 February 1974) is a Finnish former footballer who played as a striker. He played his last years in his hometown team FC PoPa.

He was born in Pori and started playing football with local club Porin Pallo-Toverit before joining the youth team of Belgian side RSC Anderlecht.

Besides in his native Finland, Sumiala has played in Danish Superliga, Danish 1st Division, Eerste Divisie, Eredivisie, 2. Bundesliga, Süper Lig, Allsvenskan, Swiss Challenge League and MLS.

Sumiala has also worked as a sporting director of PoPa and is a main owner the club.

== Career statistics ==
=== Club ===
As of 7 May 2024

Appearances and goals by club, season and competition
| Club | Season | League | | | Cup (Note: Includes Suomen Cup, Belgian Cup, KNVB Beker, Turkish Cup and Swiss Cup) | | Europe | | Total | |
| Club | Season | Division | Apps | Goals | Apps | Goals | Apps | Goals | Apps | Goals |
|---|---|---|---|---|---|---|---|---|---|---|
| Porin Pallo-Toverit | 1989 | Ykkönen | 5 | 1 | – | | – | | 5 | 1 |
| Porin Pallo-Toverit | 1990 | Ykkönen | 11 | 4 | – | | – | | 11 | 4 |
| Porin Pallo-Toverit | 1991 | Veikkausliiga | 8 | 2 | – | | – | | 8 | 2 |
| Porin Pallo-Toverit | Total | | 24 | 7 | – | – | – | – | 24 | 7 |
| Ikast | 1992–93 | Danish 1st Division | | 6 | – | | – | | | 6 |
| Jazz | 1993 | Veikkausliiga | 29 | 20 | – | | – | | 29 | 20 |
| Lokeren | 1993–94 | Belgian Second Division | 28 | 14 | 2 | 1 | – | | 30 | 15 |
| Ikast | 1994–95 | Danish Superliga | 14 | 4 | – | | – | | 14 | 4 |
| Emmen | 1994–95 | Eerste Divisie | 17 | 9 | – | | – | | 17 | 9 |
| NEC Nijmegen | 1995–96 | Eredivisie | 33 | 9 | 4 | 0 | – | | 37 | 9 |
| NEC Nijmegen | 1996–97 | Eredivisie | 33 | 8 | 4 | 3 | – | | 37 | 11 |
| NEC Nijmegen | Total | | 66 | 17 | 8 | 3 | – | – | 74 | 20 |
| Twente | 1997–98 | Eredivisie | 28 | 6 | 4 | 1 | 5 (Note: Includes UEFA Cup) | 1 | 37 | 8 |
| Twente | 1998–99 | Eredivisie | 4 | 0 | 1 | 0 | 4 (Note: Includes UEFA Intertoto Cup) | 0 | 9 | 0 |
| Twente | Total | | 32 | 6 | 5 | 1 | 9 | 1 | 46 | 8 |
| Jokerit | 1999 | Veikkausliiga | 16 | 5 | 1 | 2 | 3 | 1 | 20 | 8 |
| Jokerit | 2000 | Veikkausliiga | 33 | 11 | 0 | 0 | 2 | 1 | 35 | 12 |
| Jokerit | Total | | 49 | 16 | 1 | 2 | 5 | 2 | 55 | 20 |
| SSV Reutlingen | 2000–01 | 2. Bundesliga | 13 | 2 | 0 | 0 | – | | 13 | 2 |
| Jazz | 2001 | Veikkausliiga | 14 | 8 | 0 | 0 | – | | 14 | 8 |
| Yimpaş Yozgatspor | 2001–02 | Süper Lig | 15 | 5 | – | | – | | 15 | 5 |
| IFK Norrköping | 2002 | Allsvenskan | 12 | 11 | – | | – | | 12 | 11 |
| IFK Norrköping | 2003 | Superettan | 21 | 9 | – | | – | | 21 | 9 |
| IFK Norrköping | Total | | 33 | 20 | – | – | – | – | 33 | 20 |
| Akçaabat Sebatspor | 2003–04 | Süper Lig | 15 | 1 | 1 | 0 | – | | 16 | 1 |
| Vaduz | 2004–05 | Swiss Challenge League | 28 | 9 | 4 | 7 | – | | 32 | 16 |
| Kansas City Wizards | 2005 | MLS | 2 | 0 | – | | – | | 2 | 0 |
| Porin Palloilijat | 2006 | Kakkonen | 19 | 13 | – | | – | | 19 | 13 |
| Porin Palloilijat | 2007 | Kakkonen | 21 | 12 | – | | – | | 21 | 12 |
| Porin Palloilijat | 2008 | Kakkonen | 24 | 22 | – | | – | | 24 | 22 |
| Porin Palloilijat | 2009 | Ykkönen | 24 | 4 | 1 | 0 | – | | 25 | 4 |
| Porin Palloilijat | 2010 | Ykkönen | 12 | 3 | – | | – | | 12 | 3 |
| Porin Palloilijat | Total | | 100 | 54 | 1 | 0 | – | – | 101 | 54 |
| Career total | | | 479 | 198 | 22 | 14 | 14 | 3 | 515 | 215 |

=== International ===
As of match played 7 February 2004

Finland
| Year | Apps | Goals |
|---|---|---|
| 1992 | 2 | 0 |
| 1993 | 0 | 0 |
| 1994 | 6 | 2 |
| 1995 | 7 | 1 |
| 1996 | 3 | 1 |
| 1997 | 7 | 4 |
| 1998 | 3 | 0 |
| 1999 | 0 | 0 |
| 2000 | 5 | 1 |
| 2001 | 0 | 0 |
| 2002 | 2 | 0 |
| 2003 | 1 | 0 |
| 2004 | 2 | 0 |
| Total | 38 | 9 |

=== International goals ===
As of match played 31 January 2000. Finland score listed first, score column indicates score after each Sumiala goal.

International goals
| # | Date | Venue | Opponent | Score | Result | Competition |
|---|---|---|---|---|---|---|
| 1. | 26 October 1994 | Tallinn, Estonia | Estonia | 3–0 | 7–0 | Friendly |
| 2. | 16 November 1994 | Helsinki, Finland | Faroe Islands | 1–0 | 5–0 | UEFA Euro 1996 qualifier |
| 3. | 29 March 1995 | San Marino | San Marino | 2–0 | 2–0 | UEFA Euro 1996 qualifier |
| 4. | 6 October 1996 | Helsinki, Finland | Switzerland | 1–2 | 2–3 | 1998 FIFA World Cup qualifier |
| 5. | 30 April 1997 | Oslo, Norway | Norway | 1–0 | 1–1 | 1998 FIFA World Cup qualifier |
| 6. | 8 June 1997 | Helsinki, Finland | Azerbaijan | 3–0 | 3–0 | 1998 FIFA World Cup qualifier |
| 7. | 6 September 1997 | Lausanne, Switzerland | Switzerland | 2–0 | 2–1 | 1998 FIFA World Cup qualifier |
| 8. | 11 October 1997 | Helsinki, Finland | Hungary | 1–0 | 1–1 | 1998 FIFA World Cup qualifier |
| 9. | 31 January 2000 | La Manga Stadium, La Manga, Spain | Faroe Islands | 1–0 | 1–0 | Friendly |

Sporting positions
| Preceded by Jeffrey Kooistra | N.E.C. Topscorer; 9 Goals; 1995–1996 | Succeeded by Antti Sumiala |
Sporting positions
| Preceded by Antti Sumiala | N.E.C. Topscorer; 8 Goals; 1996–1997 | Succeeded by Emiel van Eijkeren |
