= Jarmo Alatensiö =

Finnish footballer (1963–2003)

Personal information
- Date of birth: 9 November 1963
- Place of birth: Pomarkku, Finland
- Date of death: 23 April 2003 (aged 39)
- Place of death: Pori, Finland
- Height: 1.75 m (5 ft 9 in)
- Position: Midfielder

Youth career
- –1981: PPT

Senior career*
Years	Team	Apps	(Gls)
1982–1987	PPT	134	(23)
1988–1989	IK Brage	40	(4)
1989–1996	PPT / FC Jazz	174	(30)

International career
1986–1989	Finland	19	(1)

Managerial career
- 2000: FC PoPa
- 2001: MuSa
- 2002: FC Jazz U-19
- * Club domestic league appearances and goals

Jarmo Alatensiö (9 November 1963 – 23 April 2003) was a Finnish football player.

Alatensiö began his career at Porin Pallo-Toverit (later known as FC Jazz). Where he played three seasons in the Finnish top division Mestaruussarja and was signed by Swedish Allsvenskan club IK Brage in 1988. After two years, Alatensiö returned to Pori and spent the remainder of his career for PPT/FC Jazz. During his time with the club, he won two Finnish championship titles with FC Jazz in 1993 and 1996.

Jarmo Alatensiö capped 19 times for the Finland national football team. He made his international debut in September 1987 in a match against Yugoslavia and scored his only international goal against Czechoslovakia in January 1988.

After retiring from professional football, Alatensiö pursued a brief managerial career coaching fourth- and second-tier clubs FC PoPa and MuSa at his home town Pori.

== Honours ==
=== Club titles ===
- Finnish championship: 1993, 1996

=== Personal honours ===
- Ilta-Sanomat Player of the Year Award: 1987
