= Nyyssönen =

Nyyssönen is a Finnish surname. Notable people with the surname include:

- Artturi Nyyssönen (1892–1973), Finnish footballer
- Harri Nyyssönen (born 1965), Finnish footballer
- Kai Nyyssönen (born 1972), Finnish footballer
