= 2010 Ykkönen =

Ykkönen
- Season: 2010
- Champions: RoPS
- Promoted: RoPS
- Relegated: TPV; Klubi-04; MP
- Matches: 182
- Goals: 472 (2.59 per match)
- Top goalscorer: Irakli Sirbiladze, KPV (16)

The Ykkönen Finnish football club's 2010 season began on 18 April 2010 and ended on 16 October 2010.

The winner team will qualify directly for promotion to Veikkausliiga, the second has to play a play-off against the 13th from Veikkausliiga to decide who plays in Veikkausliiga 2011. The bottom 3 teams will qualify directly for relegation to Kakkonen.

== Overview ==
Location of teams in Ykkönen 2010

Club	Location	Stadium	Capacity	Manager
FC Espoo	Espoo	Leppävaaran stadion	5,000	(Finland) Rami Luomanpää
FC Hämeenlinna	Hämeenlinna	Kaurialan kenttä	4,000	(Finland) Teuvo Palkki
JIPPO	Joensuu	Joensuun keskuskenttä	2,000	(England) Mark Dziadulewicz
Klubi-04	Helsinki	Finnair Stadium	11,000	(Finland) Juho Rantala
FC KooTeePee	Kotka	Arto Tolsa Areena	4,780	(Finland) Janne Hyppönen
KPV	Kokkola	Kokkolan keskuskenttä	3,000	(Finland) Jarmo Korhonen
MP	Mikkeli	Mikkelin Urheilupuisto	7,000	(Finland) Janne Wilkman
OPS-jp	Oulu	Castrén	4,000	(Brazil) Luiz Antonio
PK-35	Vantaa	ISS Stadion	4,500	(Finland) Pasi Pihamaa
FC PoPa	Pori	Porin Stadion	12,000	(Finland) Pertti Lundell
PS Kemi	Kemi	Sauvosaari	1,500	(Finland) Kalle Huusko
RoPS	Rovaniemi	Rovaniemen keskuskenttä	4,000	(Wales) John Allen
TPV	Tampere	Tammela Stadion	5,040	(Algeria) Mourad Seddiki
FC Viikingit	Helsinki	Vuosaaren urheilukenttä	4,200	(Finland) Toni Korkeakunnas

== League table ==
Pos	Team	Pld	W	D	L	GF	GA	GD	Pts	Promotion or relegation
1	RoPS (C, P)	26	15	9	2	61	17	+44	54	Promotion to Veikkausliiga
2	FC Viikingit	26	15	7	4	49	19	+30	52	Qualification to Promotion playoffs
3	FC PoPa	26	15	5	6	48	39	+9	50	
4	KPV	26	14	5	7	43	31	+12	47	
5	OPS	26	11	7	8	34	29	+5	40	
6	FC Espoo	26	10	7	9	32	39	−7	37	
7	FC KooTeePee	26	10	5	11	28	24	+4	35	
8	PK-35 Vantaa	26	10	4	12	36	30	+6	34	
9	PS Kemi	26	7	10	9	31	39	−8	31	
10	FC Hämeenlinna	26	9	4	13	33	43	−10	31	
11	JIPPO	26	7	9	10	23	26	−3	30	
12	TPV (R)	26	6	9	11	26	49	−23	27	Relegation to Kakkonen
13	Klubi 04 (R)	26	4	5	17	21	50	−29	17	Relegation to Kakkonen
14	MP (R)	26	5	2	19	17	47	−30	17	Relegation to Kakkonen

Source: miestenykkonen.fi
Rules for classification: 1) points; 2) goal difference; 3) number of goals scored.
(C) Champions; (P) Promoted; (R) Relegated

=== Relegation play-offs ===
The 13th placed team of 2010 Veikkausliiga and the runners-up of the 2010 Ykkönen will compete in a two-legged play-offs for one spot in the 2011 Veikkausliiga. JJK won the playoffs by 3-1 and remained again in Veikkausliiga.

27 October 2010
18:30 EEST

FC Viikingit	1 – 1	JJK
Sesay 87'		Hyyrynen 62'

Vuosaaren Urheilukenttä, Helsinki
Attendance: 3172

30 October 2010
14:00 EEST

JJK	2 – 0	FC Viikingit
Tuomanen 9'; Linjala 31'

Harjun Stadion, Jyväskylä
Attendance: 3232

== Statistics ==
=== Top goalscorers ===
Source: miestenykkonen.fi (in Finnish)

16 goals

- (Georgia (country)) Irakli Sirbiladze (KPV)

13 goals

- (Zambia) Nchimunya Mweetwa (RoPS)
- (Finland) Fidan Seferi (FC Espoo)

11 goals

- (Finland) Olli Lehtimäki (FC Hämeenlinna)

10 goals

- (Georgia (country)) Pavle Khorguashvili (RoPS)
- (Finland) Samu-Petteri Mäkelä (PoPa)

9 goals

- (Zambia) Chileshe Chibwe (RoPS)
- (Finland) Eero Peltonen (Viikingit)
- (Brazil) Denis Santos (PS Kemi)
