= Rami Nieminen =

Finnish footballer (born 1966)

Personal information
- Date of birth: 25 February 1966 (age 60)
- Place of birth: Tampere, Finland
- Height: 1.82 m (6 ft 0 in)
- Position: Defender

Youth career
- –1984: PPT

Senior career*
Years	Team	Apps	(Gls)
1985–1987	PPT	60	(4)
1988–1989	FC Haka	52	(2)
1990–2002	PPT / FC Jazz	328	(46)
2003	FC Jokerit	7	(0)
2004	FC Jazz	25	(2)
2006–2007	FC PoPa	16	(2)
Total		488	(56)

International career
1993–1996	Finland	14	(0)
- * Club domestic league appearances and goals

Rami Nieminen (born 25 February 1966) is a Finnish former footballer.

He is the most capped player in Finnish top divisions Mestaruussarja and Veikkausliiga. Nieminen played 19 seasons and 459 matches from 1985 to 1989 and 1991 to 2004 for FC Jazz (previously known as PPT), FC Haka and FC Jokerit. After his professional career Nieminen worked several years as a marketing director for FC PoPa.

== Honours ==
- Finnish championship: 1993, 1996
