= Kai Nyyssönen =

Finnish footballer (born 1972)

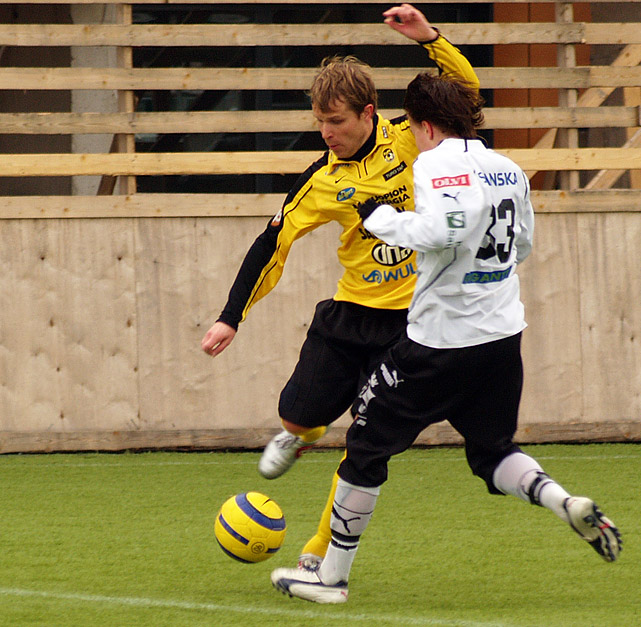
- Nyyssönen (left) with KuPS

Personal information
- Date of birth: 10 June 1972 (age 54)
- Place of birth: Kuopio, Finland
- Position: Forward

Senior career*
Years	Team	Apps	(Gls)
1990–1991	KuPS	27	(6)
1992–1995	Haka	88	(13)
1995–1998	RWD Molenbeek	46	(6)
1998	Córdoba	22	(2)
1998–1999	Motherwell	3	(1)
1999–2001	Haka	76	(22)
2001–2002	Chania	8	(1)
2002	Hämeenlinna	2	(0)
2003–2004	PP-70	35	(9)
2004–2006	KuPS	24	(1)
Total		300	(57)

International career
1996–1997	Finland	2	(0)

Managerial career
- 2007–2009: KuPS
- 2015–2016: Finland U20 (assistant)
- 2016: Finland U19
- 2016–2017: Finland U20
- 2017–2019: Finland U18
- 2018–2019: Finland U19
- 2020–2024: Finland U16
- * Club domestic league appearances and goals

Kai Nyyssönen (born 10 June 1972) is a Finnish football coach and a former professional footballer who played as a forward. He was capped twice by Finland national team between 1996 and 1997. After retiring as a player, Nyyssönen became a coach.

== Club career ==
Born in Kuopio, Nyyssönen played club football in Finland for KuPS, Haka, Hämeenlinna and PP-70, in Belgium for RWD Molenbeek, in Spain for Córdoba, in Scotland for Motherwell (where he scored once against Dundee United), and in Greece for Chania.

== International career ==
Nyyssönen earned two caps for Finland between 1996 and 1997.

== Coaching career ==
Nyyssönen managed KuPS in Ykkönen and Veikkausliiga between 2007 and 2009.

Since 2016, he was the head coach of various Finnish youth national teams.

After working for the Football Association of Finland for 15 years, in November 2024 Nyyssönen was appointed by FIFA for their Talent Development Scheme program, as the first Finnish coach.

== Personal life ==
His elder brother is fellow player Harri Nyyssönen.

== Career statistics ==
Appearances and goals by club, season and competition
Club	Season	League			National cups (Note: Includes Suomen Cup and Belgian Cup)		Europe		Total	
Club	Season	Division	Apps	Goals	Apps	Goals	Apps	Goals	Apps	Goals
KuPS	1990	Veikkausliiga	1	0	–		–		1	0
KuPS	1991	Veikkausliiga	26	6	–		–		26	6
KuPS	Total		27	6	0	0	0	0	27	6
Haka	1992	Veikkausliiga	32	8	–		–		32	8
Haka	1992	Veikkausliiga	18	4	–		–		18	4
Haka	1994	Veikkausliiga	16	0	–		–		16	0
Haka	1995	Veikkausliiga	22	1	–		–		22	1
Haka	Total		88	13	0	0	0	0	88	13
RWD Molenbeek	1995–96	Belgian First Division	13	3	1	1	–		14	4
RWD Molenbeek	1996–97	Belgian First Division	28	3	0	0	2 (Note: Includes UEFA Cup)	0	30	3
RWD Molenbeek	1997–98	Belgian First Division	5	0	0	0	–		5	0
RWD Molenbeek	Total		46	6	1	1	2	0	49	7
Córdoba	1998–99	Segunda División B	22	2	0	0	–		22	2
Motherwell	1998–99	Scottish Premier League	3	1	–		–		3	1
Haka	1999	Veikkausliiga	28	11	0	0	4 (Note: Includes UEFA Champions League)	1	32	12
Haka	2000	Veikkausliiga	29	7	0	0	4	0	33	7
Haka	2001	Veikkausliiga	19	4	0	0	5 (Note: Includes UEFA Champions League and UEFA Cup)	0	24	4
Haka	Total		66	22	0	0	13	1	79	23
Chania	2001–02	Alpha Ethniki	8	1	–		–		8	1
Hämeenlinna	2002	Veikkausliiga	2	0	–		–		2	0
PP-70	2003	Ykkönen								
PP-70	2004	Ykkönen								
PP-70	Total		35	9	0	0	0	0	35	9
KuPS	2005	Veikkausliiga	16	1	–		–		16	1
KuPS	2006	Veikkausliiga	8	0	–		–		8	0
KuPS	Total		24	1	0	0	0	0	24	1
Career total			321	62	1	1	15	1	337	64

== Honours ==
Haka

- Veikkausliiga: 1995, 1999, 2000
