= Rodrigo (footballer, born 1971) =

Brazilian footballer

Personal information
- Full name: Rodrigo Martins Vaz
- Date of birth: 24 May 1971 (age 55)
- Place of birth: Curitiba, Brazil
- Height: 1.72 m (5 ft 8 in)
- Position: Midfielder

Youth career
- –1989: Figueirense

Senior career*
Years	Team	Apps	(Gls)
1988	Tiradentes de Tijucas		
1989–1993	Bragantino		
1993–1996	FC Jazz	66	(17)
1997	HJK Helsinki	7	(0)
1998	FC Jazz	22	(6)
1999	FC Lahti	16	(2)
2000	Tampere United	20	(0)
2000–2001	USM Blida		
2001–2003	FC Jazz	50	(19)
2001–2002	→ Joinville EC		
- * Club domestic league appearances and goals

Rodrigo Martins Vaz, known as Rodrigo (born 24 May 1971), is a Brazilian former professional footballer who played as a midfielder for several clubs in Finnish Veikkausliiga and one season for USM Blida in the Algerian Ligue Professionnelle 1. He played a total of 181 Veikkausliiga caps and scored 44 goals.

== Honours ==
- Finnish Championship: 1993, 1996, 1997
