= Jari Pyykölä =

Finnish football manager (born 1956)

Personal information
- Date of birth: 29 February 1956 (age 70)
- Place of birth: Vihanti, Finland

Team information
- Current team: Tervarit (Coaching Director)

Managerial career
- Years: Team
- 1993–1994: FC 1991
- 1995: Gällivare SK
- 1996–1997: Jazz
- 1998–1999: Brommapojkarna
- 1999–2001: Lahti
- 2002–2003: KuPS
- 2005–2007: VPS
- 2009: OPS
- 2022: IFK Mariehamn

Jari Pyykölä (born 29 February 1956) is a Finnish football manager. He is currently the Coaching Director of Finnish third-tier club Tervarit.

Pyykölä has managed FC Jazz, FC Lahti, KuPS and VPS in the Finnish premier division Veikkausliiga. He was the head coach of Swedish club IF Brommapojkarna from 1998 to 1999. In 1998 the club was promoted to Superettan.

Pyykölä won the 1996 Finnish Championship title with FC Jazz. Ten months later he was replaced by Jukka Vakkila, just couple of days before the first leg of 1997–98 UEFA Champions League second qualifying round against Feyenoord. In 2008 Pyykölä was named as the head coach of OPS Oulu but he resigned before the season started.

== Honors ==
- Finnish Championship: 1996
