= Janne Suokonautio =

Finnish footballer (born 1968)

Personal information
- Date of birth: 20 May 1968 (age 58)
- Place of birth: Outokumpu, Finland
- Position: Midfielder

Senior career*
Years	Team	Apps	(Gls)
1985–1986	Honka	–	(5)
1987–1995	HJK	100	(17)
1988	→ Porin Pallo-Toverit (loan)	7	(0)
1990	→ Kuusankosken Kumu (loan)	4	(0)
1990–1991	→ Eendracht Aalst (loan)	–	(–)
1991	→ Haka (loan)	10	(1)
1996–1997	FinnPa	25	(3)
1996–1997	→ Hvidovre (loan)	4	(0)
1997–1998	Maccabi Ironi Ashdod	12	(0)
1998	PK-35	16	(0)
1999	Atlantis	9	(2)
1999	VJS	1	(1)
2002	AC Vantaa	6	(0)

International career
1993–1994	Finland	4	(0)
- * Club domestic league appearances and goals

Janne Suokonautio (born 20 May 1968) is a Finnish former footballer.

He played 12 seasons in the Finnish premier division Veikkausliiga for HJK, PPT, Kumu, FC Haka, FinnPa and PK-35. 1990/1991 Suokonautio was on loan for Eendracht Aalst in the Belgian Second Division and 1996/1997 for Hvidovre IF in the Danish Superliga. He played also for Maccabi Ironi Ashdod in the Israeli top division Liga Leumit. Suokonautio capped 4 times for the Finland national team.

== Honors ==
- Finnish Championship: 1987, 1988, 1990, 1992
