= Lyon Dantas Firmino =

Brazilian footballer

Personal information
- Date of birth: February 17, 1993 (age 33)
- Place of birth: Rio de Janeiro, Brazil
- Height: 1.80 m (5 ft 11 in)

Team information
- Current team: FC Jazz
- Number: 9

Senior career*
Years	Team	Apps	(Gls)
2022–	FC Jazz	52	(56)
- * Club domestic league appearances and goals

Lyon Dantas Firmino (born 17 February 1993) is a Brazilian football player who currently plays for FC Jazz of the Finnish Ykkönen.

== Career ==
Firmino signed with the Mikkelin Palloilijat on 2020.

Firmino moved to FC Jazz Pori in 2022. In a Kakkonen game in August 2023, Firmino scored a hat-trick in just five minutes. FC Jazz was promoted to the Ykkönen for the 2024 season. Firmino scored 23 goals in his first season with Jazz, leading the league. He was chosen as the player of the year.

== Personal life ==
Lyon Dantas Firmino was born in Rio de Janeiro, Brazil in 1993. He quit school at age nine to work. Firmino and his wife have a daughter.
