= Juho Lehtonen =

Finnish footballer (born 1992)

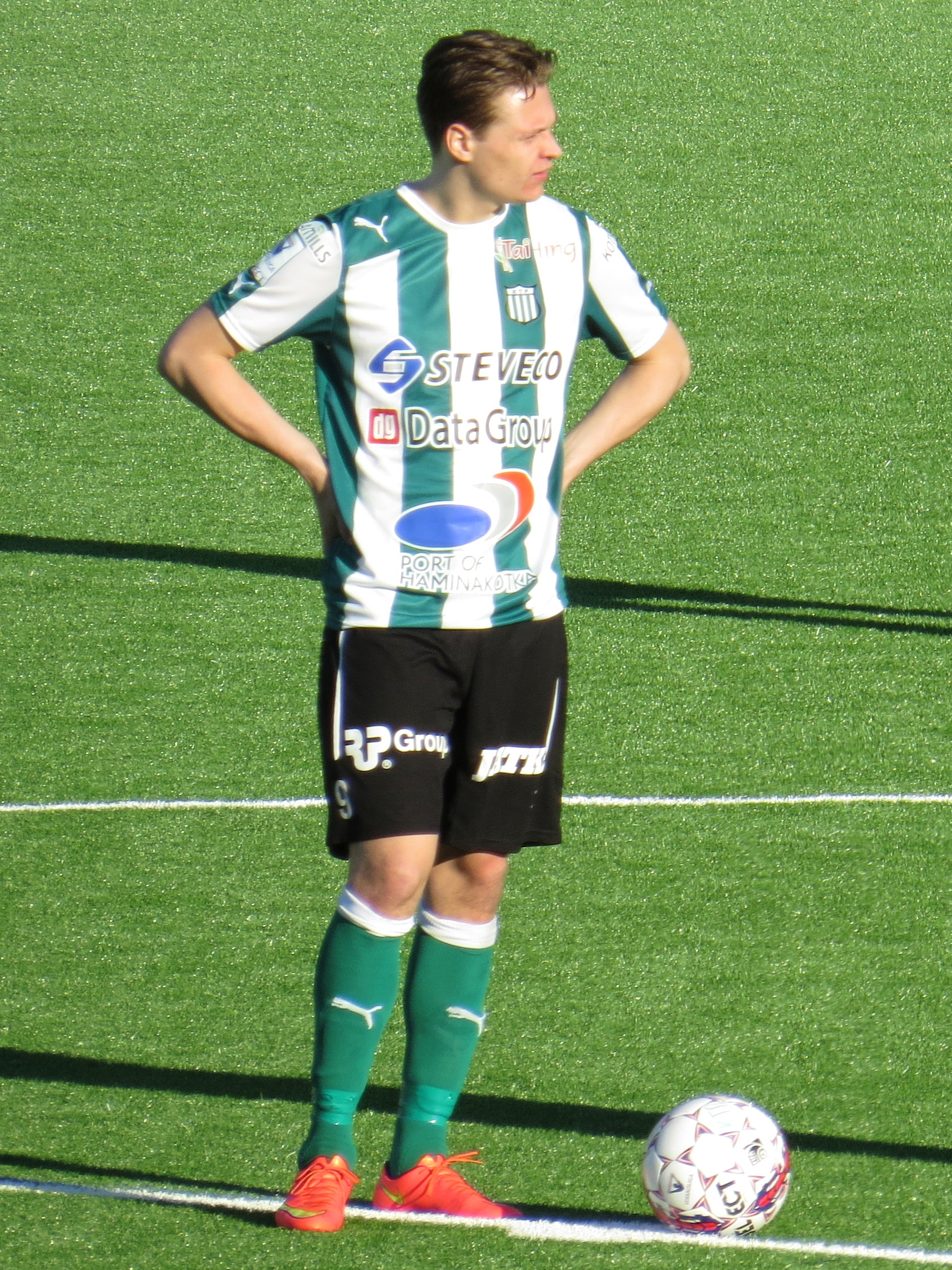

Personal information
- Date of birth: August 3, 1992 (age 34)
- Place of birth: Rauma, Finland
- Height: 1.81 m (5 ft 11 1/2 in)
- Position: Forward

Team information
- Current team: FC Jazz
- Number: 10

Youth career
- –2008: Pallo-Iirot

Senior career*
Years	Team	Apps	(Gls)
2008	Pallo-Iirot	1	(0)
2009–2010	FC PoPa	43	(20)
2011–2014	TPS	91	(14)
2011–2013	→ ÅIFK (loan)	6	(2)
2013	→ FC Haka (loan)	2	(0)
2015	KTP	22	(3)
2016–	FC Jazz		

International career^{‡}
2009–2010	Finland U-19	9	(0)
2011–2013	Finland U-21	8	(0)
- * Club domestic league appearances and goals as of 3 April 2016 ‡ National team caps and goals as of 3 April 2016

Juho Lehtonen, born 3 August 1992 in Rauma, Finland, is a Finnish footballer currently playing for FC Jazz. He has previously played for TPS and KTP in the Finnish premier division Veikkausliiga.
