= Saku Laaksonen =

Finnish footballer (born 1970)

Personal information
- Date of birth: 8 August 1970 (age 56)
- Place of birth: Pori
- Positions: Forward; winger

Senior career*
Years	Team	Apps	(Gls)
1988–1992	PPT/FC Jazz	112	(35)
1993–1994	MyPa	44	(11)
1995–1999	FC Jazz	111	(16)
2000	MuSa	16	(2)
2000	FC Lahti	13	(3)
2001	FC Jazz	31	(3)
2002	MuSa	2	(1)

International career
1992, 1997	Finland	2	(0)
- * Club domestic league appearances and goals

Saku Laaksonen (born 8 August 1970) is a retired Finnish football midfielder. He played 12 seasons in highest tier of Finnish football.

== Honours ==
=== As a player ===
FC Jazz

- Veikkausliiga: 1996
