= Marco (footballer, born 1975) =

Brazilian footballer

Personal information
- Full name: Marco Antonio Pogioli
- Date of birth: 9 June 1975 (age 51)
- Place of birth: Maringá, Brazil
- Height: 1.79 m (5 ft 10 1/2 in)
- Position: Forward

Youth career
- 1986–1994: Grêmio Maringá

Senior career*
Years	Team	Apps	(Gls)
1997–1999	FC Jazz	68	(21)
2000–2001	FC Haka	35	(6)
2002–2004	KuPS	76	(24)
- * Club domestic league appearances and goals

Marco Antonio Pogioli, known as Marco (born 9 June 1975) is a retired Brazilian footballer who played in Finland for FC Jazz, FC Haka and KuPS Kuopio.

He played seven seasons and 148 caps scoring 39 goals in the Finnish top division Veikkausliiga between 1997 and 2003. Marco ended his career playing for KuPS in the Finnish second tier in 2004. In 1997–98 UEFA Champions League second qualifying round match he scored twice for FC Jazz against Feyenoord.At present he lives in a city in the interior of the state of Paraná called Maringa in southern Brazil. I work in the automotive branch of Vehicle Sales Manager.

== Honours ==
- Finnish Championship: 2000
