= Jussi Ristimäki =

Finnish former football manager (born 1944)

Personal information
- Date of birth: 30 January 1944 (age 82)
- Place of birth: Seinäjoki, Finland

Senior career*
Years	Team	Apps	(Gls)
1961	TP-55		
1962–1968	SePS		
1969–1974	Ilves-Kissat	81	(1)
1975–1977	Ilves		

International career
1962	Finland U18	2	(0)

Managerial career
- 1978–1981: Ilves (assistant)
- 1982–1984: Ilves
- 1985–1988: TPV
- 1989–1990: Ilves
- 1993–1994: Jazz
- 1995: TPV
- 2001–2002: Jazz
- 2006: Porin Palloilijat
- 2009–2011: Ilves-Kissat
- * Club domestic league appearances and goals

Jussi Ristimäki (born 30 January 1944) is a Finnish former football manager and a former player. As a player, he played 81 matches in the top-tier Mestaruussarja. As a manager, Ristimäki has won two Finnish championship titles, with Ilves in 1983 and Jazz in 1993. With Ilves, they also won the Finnish Cup in 1990.

== Honours ==
Ilves

- Mestaruussarja: 1983
- Finnish Cup: 1990

Jazz

- Veikkausliiga: 1993
