= Paul Lazarus (footballer) =

English footballer

Personal information
- Date of birth: 4 September 1962 (age 64)
- Place of birth: Stepney, England
- Position: Forward

Senior career*
Years	Team	Apps	(Gls)
1980–1981	Charlton Athletic	2	(1)
1981	Kuopion Elo	17	(13)
1981–1982	Wimbledon	18	(6)
1982	Koparit	24	(16)
1982–1983	Dagenham	9	(4)
1983	Koparit	25	(8)
1983–1984	Maidstone United	12	(1)
1984	FinnPa	9	(4)
1984–1985	Maidstone United	21	(6)
1985	FinnPa	21	(7)
1985–1986	Chelmsford City	24	(8)
1987	FinnPa	17	(5)
1987	Chelmsford City	3	(0)
1987–1988	Fisher Athletic	17	(5)
1988	FinnPa	16	(3)
1990–1991	HIFK	?	(16)
1992–1997	IF Gnistan	?	(62)
2000	FC Kontu Itä-Helsinki	4	(0)
- * Club domestic league appearances and goals

Paul Lazarus (born 4 September 1962) is an English retired professional footballer who played in the English Football League as a forward.

== Honours ==
Wimbledon

- Football League Group Cup runner-up: 1981–82
