= Mikko Mannila =

Finnish football manager (born 1975)

Personal information
- Date of birth: 2 March 1975 (age 51)
- Place of birth: Pori, Finland

Team information
- Current team: OLS (manager)

Youth career
- Porin Pallo-Toverit
- TPS

Senior career*
Years	Team	Apps	(Gls)
- Jazz

Managerial career
- 2001–2006: PoPa
- 2007–2010: Jazz
- 2011: NiceFutis
- 2014–2017: HJK U17
- 2018–2020: Klubi 04
- 2020–2021: RoPS
- 2022–2023: Lahti
- 2024–: OLS
- * Club domestic league appearances and goals as of 12 September 2024

Mikko Mannila (born 2 March 1975) is a Finnish football manager of Ykkönen club OLS and a former player.

== Coaching career ==
Mannila started coaching his home town clubs Porin Palloilijat and FC Jazz in 2001–2010. In 2011, he coached a local women's football club NiceFutis.

During 2012–2014 he worked mostly outside football.

In 2014, Mannila started as a youth coach in HJK Helsinki. On 10 November 2017, he was named the head coach of the club's reserve team Klubi 04.

=== RoPS ===
On 16 September 2020, Mannila was named the manager of Veikkausliiga club Rovaniemen Palloseura (RoPS), replacing sacked Vesa Tauriainen. However, at the end of the shortened league season affected by the pandemic, RoPS were relegated to the second-tier Ykkönen. Next season Mannila led RoPS to finish 2nd in Ykkönen and qualify for the Veikkausliiga promotion play-offs, eventually falling short to AC Oulu. Later RoPS were demoted to the third-tier Kakkonen for the 2022 season due to financial problems, and Mannila decided to leave the club.

=== FC Lahti ===
On 26 June 2022, Mannila was appointed the manager of Veikkausliiga club FC Lahti, replacing Ilir Zeneli. He managed to keep Lahti in the league, but couldn't change the club's direction in the 2023 season, and eventually Mannila was dismissed on 31 August 2023.

=== OLS ===
On 12 September 2024, Mannila was named a head coach of Ykkönen club Oulun Luistinseura (OLS), the reserve team of AC Oulu.
