= Sairanen =

Sairanen is a Finnish surname.

== Geographical distribution ==
As of 2014, 93.9% of all known bearers of the surname Sairanen were residents of Finland (frequency 1:3,938), 1.4% of Sweden (1:468,893) and 1.3% of the United States (1:18,062,564).

In Finland, the frequency of the surname was higher than national average (1:3,938) in the following regions:

- Southern Savonia (1:409)
- South Karelia (1:882)
- Päijänne Tavastia (1:3,094)
- North Karelia (1:3,218)
- Southwest Finland (1:3,276)
- Kymenlaakso (1:3,488)

== People ==
- Seppo Sairanen (born 1952), Finnish football manager and former football goalkeeper
