= Jukka Ruhanen =

Finnish footballer (born 1971)

Personal information
- Date of birth: 16 April 1971 (age 55)
- Place of birth: Mikkeli, Finland
- Height: 1.77 m (5 ft 9 1/2 in)
- Position: Midfielder

Senior career*
Years	Team	Apps	(Gls)
1987–1993	MP	152	(32)
1994–1995	FC Jazz	48	(15)
1996–2002	FC Haka	157	(41)
2003	Canvey Island	6	(0)
2003	MyPa	14	(0)
2004–2005	SoVo		

International career
- Finland U21
1992–1995	Finland	15	(3)
- * Club domestic league appearances and goals

Jukka Ruhanen (born 16 April 1971) is a retired Finnish footballer who played as a midfielder.

== Club career ==
Ruhanen began his career at hometown club MP, making three appearances in the 1987 Mestaruussarja season. Over the course of seven seasons at MP, Ruhanen made 152 league appearances, scoring 32 goals for the club. Ahead of the 1994 Veikkausliiga season, Ruhanen signed for FC Jazz. In a two season stint at Jazz, Ruhanen scored 15 goals across 48 Veikkausliiga games, as Jazz finished second in both campaigns. In 1996, Ruhanen signed for FC Haka. In 1997, Ruhanen scored 15 goals in 24 Ykkönen appearances, as the club gained promotion back to the Veikkausliiga, as well as winning the 1997 Finnish Cup. Ruhanen was a regular in Haka's team as the club won three consecutive Veikkausliiga titles, as well as winning another Finnish Cup in 2002.

On 3 January 2003, Ruhanen signed for English club Canvey Island, as the club fought for promotion from the Isthmian League. Ruhanen made six league appearances for Canvey Island, before being released in March 2003. Upon his release from the club, Ruhanen returned to his native Finland, signing for MyPa. Ruhanen saw out the rest of the season at MyPa, making 14 Veikkausliiga appearances. In 2004, Ruhanen dropped down to the fourth tier of Finnish football, signing for SoVo, as the club won promotion to the Kakkonen. Ruhanen retired in 2005.

== International career ==
Ruhanen represented Finland at under-21 level. On 12 February 1992, Ruhanen made his debut for Finland in a 1–1 draw against Turkey. On 21 February 1993, Ruhanen scored his first goal for Finland in a 3–0 win against Lithuania. In total, Ruhanen made 15 appearances for Finland, scoring three times.

=== International goals ===
Scores and results list Finland's goal tally first.

No.	Date	Venue	Opponent	Score	Result	Competition
1	21 February 1993	Myyrmäki-halli, Vantaa, Finland	Lithuania	2–0	3–0	1993 Baltic Indoor Cup
2	26 October 1994	Kadriorg Stadium, Tallinn, Estonia	Estonia	2–0	7–0	Friendly
3	26 October 1994	Kadriorg Stadium, Tallinn, Estonia	Estonia	6–0	7–0	Friendly
