= Lasse Karjalainen =

Finnish footballer (born 1974)

Personal information
- Date of birth: 22 October 1974 (age 52)
- Place of birth: Botkyrka, Sweden
- Height: 1.78 m (5 ft 10 in)
- Position: Defender

Youth career
- –1990: PPT Pori

Senior career*
| Years | Team | Apps | (Gls) |
| 1991–1994 | FC Jazz | 62 | (0) |
| 1995–2005 | FC Haka | 240 | (11) |
| 2006 | FC PoPa | 24 | (4) |
| Total | | 326 | (5) |

International career
| 1994–2002 | Finland | 15 | (0) |
- * Club domestic league appearances and goals

Lasse Karjalainen (born 22 October 1974) is a Finnish former footballer. He was born in Sweden but spent most of his childhood at Pori, Finland.

Karjalainen played 14 seasons in the Finnish premier division Veikkausliiga for FC Jazz and FC Haka. He capped 15 times for the Finland national team. Karjalainen is the player with most Finnish Championship titles.

== Honors ==
- Finnish Championship: 1993, 1995, 1998, 1999, 2000, 2004
- Finnish Cup: 1997, 2002, 2005
- Finnish League Cup: 1995
