= Kymäläinen =

Kymäläinen is a Finnish surname. Notable people with the surname include:

- Pauno Kymäläinen (born 1949), Finnish footballer
- Suna Kymäläinen (born 1976), Finnish politician
