= Hasan Çetinkaya =

Swedish footballer

Personal information
- Full name: Hasan Çetinkaya
- Date of birth: 27 January 1977 (age 49)
- Height: 1.79 m (5 ft 10 in)
- Position: Midfielder

Senior career*
Years	Team	Apps	(Gls)
- IF Sylvia
1995–1998	IFK Norrköping	46	(4)
1999	FC Jazz	29	(6)
2000–2005	Landskrona BoIS	122	(11)
2005	Assyriska	12	(2)
2006	Jönköpings Södra IF	20	(1)
2007–2008	Trelleborgs FF	10	(0)

International career
1994	Sweden U19	7	(1)
1997	Sweden U21	1	(0)
- * Club domestic league appearances and goals

Hasan Çetinkaya (born 27 January 1977) is a Swedish former footballer who played as a midfielder. He works today as a sports agent and the CEO of HCM Sports, representing among others Frenkie de Jong, Ramy Bensebaini, Denis Zakaria, Donny van de Beek, Noa Lang, Justin Bijlow, Emil Forsberg, Péter Gulácsi, Martin Braithwaite, Viktor Gyökeres and Victor Lindelöf.

== Sources ==
- Finnish Veikkausliiga statistics
