= Pertti Lundell =

Finnish football manager (born 1952)

Personal information
- Date of birth: 12 August 1952 (age 74)
- Place of birth: Pori, Finland

Senior career*
| Years | Team | Apps | (Gls) |
| –1972 | Ässät | – | (–) |
| 1973 | PoPS | – | (–) |
| 1974–1977 | MuSa | – | (–) |
| 1978–1979 | PPT Pori | – | (4) |

Managerial career
- 1980–1986: Porin Pallo-Toverit
- 1987–1988: Euran Pallo
- 1989–1992: Pallo-Iirot
- 1993–1994: TPV
- 1995, 1998–2000: Jazz
- 2001–2002: Inter Turku
- 2007–2010: PoPa
- * Club domestic league appearances and goals

Pertti "Lunkka" Lundell (born 12 August 1952) is a Finnish football manager. He is currently working as a youth coach for a Finnish club Musan Salama.

Lundell has been coaching 11 seasons in the Finnish premier divisions Mestaruussarja and Veikkausliiga. He's been nominated twice as the Finnish Football Manager of the Year. On his player career Lundell played for Pori-based clubs in the lower divisions.

== Honors ==
Club honors

- Finnish Championship: 1994

Personal honors

- Finnish Football Manager of the Year: 1983, 1994
