= Jouni Joensuu =

Finnish football manager (born 1962)

Personal information
- Date of birth: 26 October 1962 (age 64)
- Place of birth: Pori, Finland

Managerial career
- Years: Team
- 1991–1995: FC PoPa
- 1996–2000: MuSa
- 2001: FC Jazz
- 2002: FC PoPa
- 2004: FJK
- 2005–2010: NiceFutis
- 2011: FC Jazz

Jouni Joensuu (born 26 October 1962) is a Finnish football manager currently working as the executive director for FC Jazz. He's been previously coaching FC Jazz in the Finnish premier division Veikkausliiga and NiceFutis in the Finnish women's premier league Naisten Liiga as well as several teams in the Finnish lower divisions.

From 1996-2000 Joensuu coached Musa Flash, in the Finnish 1st Division, after which he was appointed the head coach of FC Jazz in 2001. Joensuu left FC Jazz in July 2002, and his replacement was Jussi Ristimäki. He went on to coach FC PoPa and Forssan Jalkapalloklubi (FJK).

== Women's Football ==
In 2005, he went to coach NiceFutis FC, a women's football club playing in the Women's 1st Division. He was the head coach of NiceFutis FC for a total of six seasons, lifting the club in 2007, to the Naisten Liiga (The Women's League), which is the premier division of women's football in Finland. He has worked for the Finnish Football Association as a trainer and coaching instructor, as well as developing women's soccer in Finland. In August 2011, Joensuu was appointed the head coach of FC Jazz where he also served as Executive Director of FC Jazz.

== Background ==
He has been active in football since the mid-1970s when he started playing on the 1st team squad of professional teams at the age of 15 when he was a youth player. At the end of his playing career, he transitioned to coaching and sports education, ultimately becoming the head coach of FC Jazz. He is married with three children and sports has always been an integral part of his family life - football, hockey and baseball. Jouni Joensuu is the father of ice hockey player Jesse Joensuu, who currently plays for Edmonton Oilers in the National Hockey League.

== Work in Education ==
He has led various educational initiatives in athletic education at the primary, middle school and secondary school in Pori and the neighboring communities. As a result of these efforts FC Jazz has been very popular with the youth of the local community as he has spearheaded many vocational activities for them. He has even used his work as a coach in providing therapy to people with mental health disabilities through sports activities in the local community.
