= Jarno Heinikangas =

Finnish footballer (born 1979)

Personal information
- Date of birth: 5 March 1979 (age 47)
- Place of birth: Pori, Finland
- Height: 1.87 m (6 ft 2 in)
- Positions: Defender; defensive midfielder

Youth career
- PiTU

Senior career*
| Years | Team | Apps | (Gls) |
| 1997–1999 | FC Jazz | 24 | (1) |
| 2000–2002 | FC Lahti | 59 | (1) |
| 2003–2011 | TPS | 200 | (10) |

International career
| 2004–2005 | Finland | 3 | (0) |
- * Club domestic league appearances and goals as of 28 June 2010

Jarno Heinikangas (born 5 March 1979) is a retired Finnish football player.
