= Risto Puustinen =

Finnish footballer and manager (born 1959)

Personal information
- Date of birth: 28 September 1959 (age 67)
- Place of birth: Joutseno, Finland
- Height: 1.72 m (5 ft 8 in)
- Positions: Midfielder; striker

Team information
- Current team: FC Jazz

Youth career
- Kataja, Ässät

Senior career*
Years	Team	Apps	(Gls)
1976–1984	PPT Pori		(88)
1980	→ Ässät Pori		(13)
1985–1988	HJK Helsinki	52	(14)
1989–1993	Pallo-Iirot		(37)
1994	Pargas IF	26	(2)
1995	RiPS Riihimäki		
1996	HaPo Harjavalta		
1998–1999	Sporting Kristina	15	(1)

International career
1983–1988	Finland	11	(0)

Managerial career
- 1995–2026: Pallo-Iirot, FC PoPa, MuSa
- 2026–: FC Jazz
- * Club domestic league appearances and goals

Risto Puustinen (born 28 September 1959) is a Finnish football manager and a former footballer. He is currently the head coach of FC Jazz.

Puustinen played five seasons in the Finnish premier division Mestaruussarja for PPT Pori and HJK Helsinki from 1984 to 1988. He capped 11 times for the Finland national team.

== Honors ==
- Finnish Championship: 1985, 1988, 1988
