= Matti Santahuhta =

Finnish footballer and manager (born 1981)

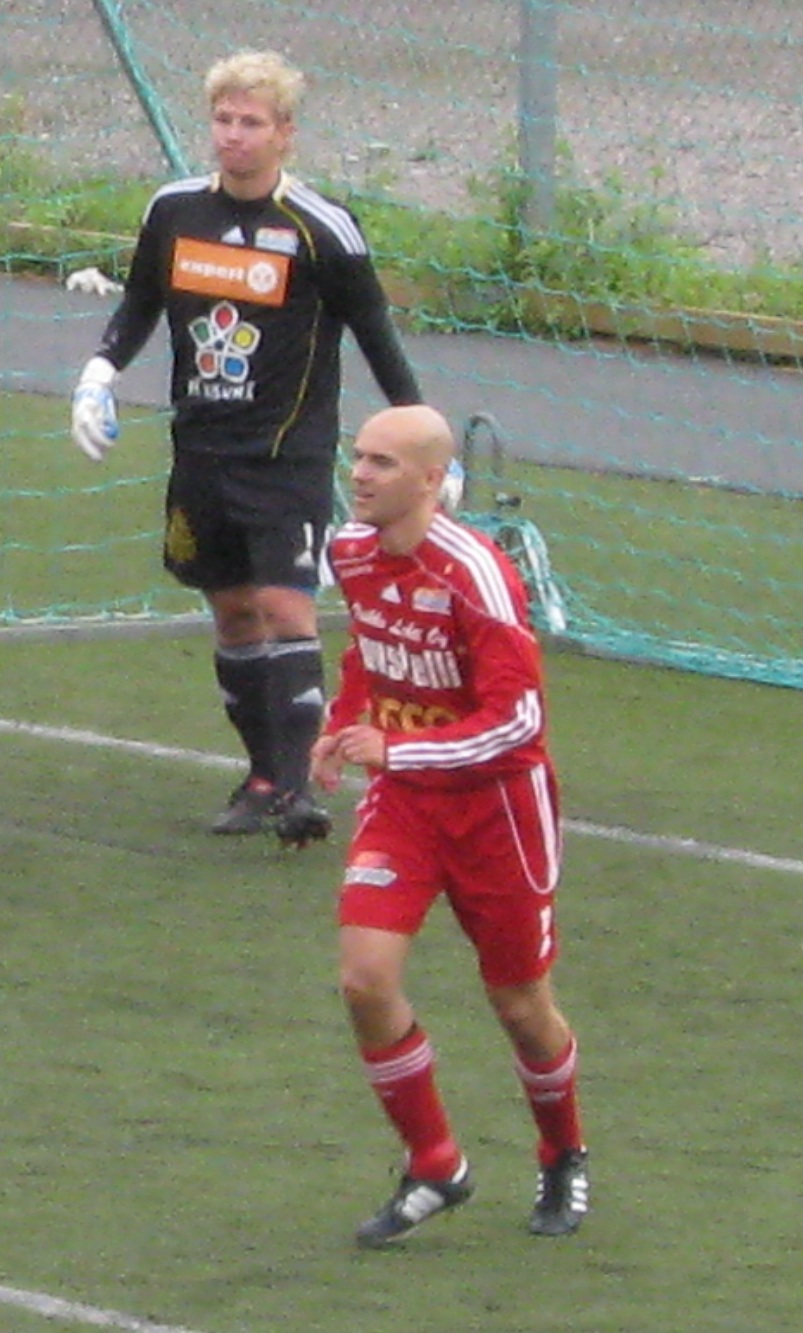

Personal information
- Date of birth: 13 August 1981 (age 45)
- Place of birth: Pori, Finland
- Height: 1.76 m (5 ft 9 1/2 in)
- Position: Midfielder

Senior career*
Years	Team	Apps	(Gls)
2000–2001	FC Jazz	41	(6)
2002–2003	Tampere Utd	20	(1)
2003–2004	FC Jazz	44	(11)
2005	VPS Vaasa	15	(4)
2006–2009	FC PoPa	85	(32)
2009	→ PP-70	5	(0)
2010–2011	FC Jazz	49	(4)

International career
2000	Finland U-21	1	(1)
2001	Finland U-20	2	(0)

Managerial career
- 2012–: FC Jazz
- * Club domestic league appearances and goals

Matti Santahuhta (born 13 August 1981) is a Finnish football manager and a former footballer. He has recently been coaching FC Jazz in the Finnish third tier Kakkonen.

Santahuhta played five seasons in the Finnish premier division Veikkausliiga for FC Jazz and Tampere United. He was a member of the Finland squad at the 2001 FIFA World Youth Championship in Argentina.
