= Ricky (footballer, born 1973) =

Spanish footballer

Personal information
- Full name: Ricardo Fargas Roger
- Date of birth: 24 May 1973 (age 53)
- Place of birth: Manresa, Spain
- Height: 1.81 m (5 ft 11 1/2 in)
- Position: Forward

Senior career*
Years	Team	Apps	(Gls)
1993–1994	FC Palafrugell	22	(25)
1993–1994	CD Castellón	9	(1)
1994–1996	Villarreal CF	47	(3)
1996–1997	CD Leganés	8	(0)
1997–1998	UDA Gramenet	22	(3)
1998	FC Jazz	8	(6)
1999–2002	CE L'Hospitalet	76	(17)
2003–2004	Palamós CF	28	(3)
2004–2005	CF Vilanova	–	(4)
2005–2006	UE Vilassar de Mar	–	(–)
2006–2007	EC Granollers	28	(13)
- * Club domestic league appearances and goals as of 2 May 2013

Ricardo Fargas Roger (born 24 May 1973), known as Ricky, is a Spanish former footballer.

Ricky played four seasons in the Segunda División for Castellón, Villarreal and Leganés. In August 1998 he joined the Finnish top division Veikkausliiga club FC Jazz. Ricky was the first Spanish player in Finnish football series. He later returned to Spain where he played for several years in the lower divisions.
