= Hector Takayama =

Peruvian footballer (born 1972)

Héctor Takayama
Personal information
- Full name: Héctor Rubén Takayama Tohara
- Date of birth: 5 April 1972 (age 54)
- Place of birth: Lima, Peru
- Height: 1.67 m (5 ft 5 1/2 in)
- Position: Midfielder

Senior career*
Years	Team	Apps	(Gls)
1989–1991	Deportivo AELU		
- Sport Boys
- Unión Huaral
1994	Carlos Mannucci		
1995	Deportivo Municipal		
- Tosu Futures
2000–2001	FC Jazz	49	(8)
- * Club domestic league appearances and goals

Héctor Rubén Takayama Tohara (born 5 April 1972) is a Peruvian former football player who runs a football academy in Lima.

== Club career ==
Japanese Peruvian Takayama was born in Lima. He played for several clubs in Peru, Japan and Finland. In the Finnish Veikkausliiga, he played 49 times for FC Jazz scoring 8 goals. He also played for the Finnish club in the 2001 UEFA Intertoto Cup.

== Sources ==
- Hector Takayama, Futbol Peruano(in Spanish)
- Veikkausliiga statistics
