= Jani Uotinen =

Finnish football coach and former player

Personal information
- Date of birth: 17 May 1978 (age 48)
- Place of birth: Kuusankoski, Finland
- Height: 5 ft 6 in (1.68 m)
- Position: Midfielder

Senior career*
| Years | Team | Apps | (Gls) |
| 1995 | Kultsu | 2 | (0) |
| 1996 | Reipas | 11 | (2) |
| 1996–1999 | MyPa | 63 | (5) |
| 2000–2002 | Kuusankoski | 38 | (15) |
| 2002–2004 | Greenock Morton | 54 | (9) |
| 2004 | MyPa | 8 | (2) |
| 2004 | Rakuunat | 6 | (4) |
| 2005–2008 | VPS | 63 | (6) |
| 2009 | VIFK | 1 | (0) |

Managerial career
- 2014: Jazz
- 2016: Jazz
- 2018–2019: SJK (U23)
- 2019–2020: KPV
- 2021–2022: Jazz
- 2023: KuPS (youth)
- * Club domestic league appearances and goals

Jani Uotinen (born 17 May 1978) is a Finnish former footballer. He played for two seasons in the Scottish Football League with Greenock Morton as a central midfielder.

In his homeland, he has played internationally for Finland's Futsal side as well as playing for MyPa, VPS and retired in July 2009 after playing with Vasa IFK (whom he joined in January 2009).

== Coaching career ==
After retiring, it was announced in October 2009 that Uotinen had been hired as a youth coach for his former club VPS, having already worked as a youth coach for VPS earlier.

In 2014, he moved to FC Jazz where he was hired as a youth coach as well. However, in August 2014, he was appointed first team manager for the rest of the season after the departure of Jouni Joensuu. Uotinen was in charge for 10 games, picking up 13 points, before the club at the end of October 2018 announced, that he would continue in his role as a youth coach. In July 2016, he was once again appointed first team manager for the rest of the season, this time after the departure of John Allen.

Uotinen left Jazz at the end of the season after it was announced already in November 2016, that he would join TPS as academy coach from the new year. He left in November 2017 where his contract expired and it was immediately announced, that he would continue at SJK from the new year as an academy coach and manager of the club's U23 team. He left the position in July 2019 and became the manager of KPV.

== Honours ==
=== Greenock Morton ===
- Scottish Football League Third Division: 1

2002–03
