= Richard Wilson (footballer, born 1960) =

English footballer

Personal information
- Date of birth: 8 May 1960 (age 66)
- Place of birth: Orpington, England
- Position: Midfielder

Senior career*
Years	Team	Apps	(Gls)
1978–1979	Chelsea	0	(0)
1979–1981	Charlton Athletic	17	(1)
1981–1982	Hangö IK	?	(15)
1983–1985	Porin Pallotoverit	67	(31)
1986	FC Haka	21	(4)
1987–1989	FF Jaro	?	(21)
1990	Mjølner	18	(6)
1991	Kokkolan Palloveikot	18	(5)
- * Club domestic league appearances and goals

Richard Wilson (born 8 May 1960) is an English former professional footballer who played in the Football League as a midfielder.

Wilson spent most of his professional career in Finland. He played four seasons in the Finnish top level Mestaruussarja. Wilson scored 23 goals in 84 matches for PPT, Haka and FF Jaro. He was the top scorer of PPT in 1984, finishing 9 goals in 19 matches.

In 1987, Wilson started as a player-coach for FF Jaro in third tier Kakkonen. In two seasons, he managed to promote the club to top division. A year later, Wilson was sacked from the manager post. However, he finished the season as a player. In 1990, he spent the season as player manager of Norwegian second tier club Mjølner. Wilson ended his Finnish career in second tier club KPV in 1991.
