= Mika Sankala =

Finnish footballer and manager (born 1964)

Personal information
- Date of birth: 16 November 1964 (age 61)
- Place of birth: Kemi, Finland
- Height: 1.75 m (5 ft 9 in)
- Position: Midfielder

Team information
- Current team: Finland women (assistant)

Senior career*
| Years | Team | Apps | (Gls) |
| 1979–1980 | Kaskö IK | 18 | (–) |
| 1981 | Vasa IFK | 25 | (2) |
| 1982 | Sepsi-78 | 25 | (2) |
| 1983–1985 | PPT Pori | 67 | (24) |
| 1987–1990 | GIF Sundsvall | 64 | (6) |
| 1993 | Matfors IF | 19 | (2) |
| 1995–2000 | Kaskö IK | 30 | (6) |

Managerial career
- 2001–2002: Stockviks FF
- 2005–2008: GIF Sundsvall
- 2009–2010: Umeå IK
- 2013–: Finland women (assistant)
- * Club domestic league appearances and goals

Mika Sankala (born 16 November 1964) is a Finnish football manager and a former footballer. He is currently the assistant coach for Finland women's national football team.

He played three seasons in the Finnish premier league Mestaruussarja for Sepsi-78 and PPT Pori and three seasons in Swedish Allsvenskan for GIF Sundsvall. Sankala has coached GIF Sundsvall in Allsvenskan and Superettan and Umeå IK in women's Damallsvenskan. January 2013 he joined the coaching staff of Finland women's national team.
