= Alekos Alekou =

Cypriot football striker

Personal information
- Full name: Alekos Alekou
- Date of birth: 13 December 1983 (age 42)
- Place of birth: Limassol, Cyprus
- Height: 1.85 m (6 ft 1 in)
- Position: Striker

Team information
- Current team: Agiou Tychona

Senior career*
Years	Team	Apps	(Gls)
2000–2006	Aris Limassol	43	(7)
2006	Iraklis	4	(0)
2006–2008	Aris Limassol	22	(2)
2008–2010	Ethnikos Achna	48	(20)
2010–2011	APOP Kinyras	14	(3)
2011	AEK Larnaca	2	(0)
2011	Nea Salamina Famagusta	7	(0)
2012	Soproni	4	(2)
2012–2013	Aris Limassol	20	(6)
2013–2014	PAO Krousonas	9	(3)
2014	Anagennisi Giannitsa	6	(0)
2014	Jazz	20	(14)
2015	Chania	5	(1)
2015	Barito Putera	1	(0)
2016	KTP	5	(1)
2016–2017	Poprad	8	(3)
2017–2018	Ayia Napa	12	(3)
2018	APEP	13	(9)
2018–2019	Agiou Tychona	10	(0)
2019–2020	Omonia	18	(3)
2020	Agiou Tychona	8	(2)
2020–2021	Evagoras Paphos	12	(0)
2022–	Agiou Tychona	23	(6)

International career^{‡}
2005–2008	Cyprus	3	(0)
- * Club domestic league appearances and goals as of 12 November 2016 ‡ National team caps and goals as of 9 April 2014

Alekos Alekou (born 13 December 1983 in Limassol, Cyprus) is a Cypriot footballer who plays as a striker for Agiou Tychona.

Alekou has previously played for several teams in the Cypriot First Division and for Iraklis in the Super League Greece. Alekou made his debut for the Cyprus national team in 2005 against Wales.

On 10 May 2016, he joined Finnish KTP. After having played only five matches for KTP due to injuries, Alekou mutually agreed with his club on 28 July 2016 to terminate his contract.

== Video links ==
- Watch Alekos Alekou goals in FC Jazz.
