= Harri Nyyssönen =

Finnish footballer (born 1965)

Personal information
- Full name: Harri Nyyssönen
- Date of birth: 15 November 1965 (age 60)
- Place of birth: Mikkeli, Finland
- Position: Midfielder

Senior career*
Years	Team	Apps	(Gls)
1984–1991	KuPS	142	(9)
1992–1995	Haka	50	(1)
1995	Lahti	7	(0)
1996	Hämeenlinna	15	(4)
1998–1999	KuPS	24	(0)
Total		238	(14)

International career
1991–1992	Finland	5	(0)
- * Club domestic league appearances and goals

Harri Nyyssönen (born 15 November 1965) is a Finnish former footballer who played at both professional and international levels as a midfielder. His brother is fellow player Kai Nyyssönen.

== Career ==
Born in Mikkeli, Nyyssönen played club football for KuPS, Haka, Lahti and Hämeenlinna.

He also earned five caps for Finland between 1991 and 1992.
