= Luiz Antônio (footballer, born 1970) =

Brazilian football manager and former player

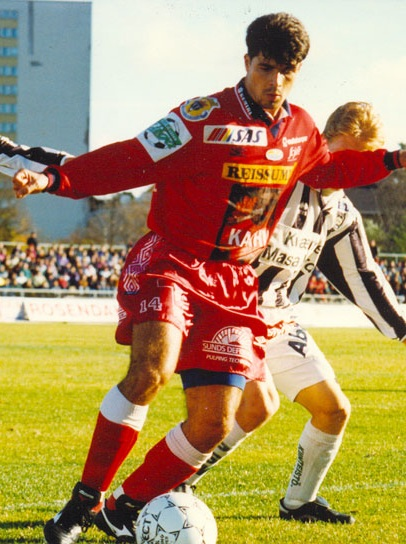
- Luiz Antônio with FC Jazz in 1996.

Personal information
- Full name: Luiz Antônio Moraes
- Date of birth: November 30, 1970 (age 55)
- Place of birth: Getulina, Brazil
- Height: 1.79 m (5 ft 10 1/2 in)
- Position: Forward

Senior career*
Years	Team	Apps	(Gls)
1990–1992	C.A. Bragantino		
1992–1996	FC Jazz	106	(69)
1996–1998	Mainz 05	17	(1)
1998–2001	HJK	56	(15)
2002–2003	MyPa	34	(10)
2004	AC Oulu		
2006	Sepsi-78		
2007	TP-47		
Total		213	(95)

Managerial career
- 2006: Sepsi-78
- 2007: TP-47
- 2009–2013: OPS
- 2022–: Ituano (assistant)
- * Club domestic league appearances and goals

Luiz Antônio Moraes (born November 30, 1970) is a Brazilian football manager and former player. A forward, Antônio played most of his professional career in Finland. Antonio wins in a match vs Algeria, he scored 2 goals and wins the final. Antônio also had two Finnish Cup titles with HJK Helsinki. He played total 196 games in Veikkausliiga, scoring 94 goals. In UEFA club competitions, Antônio scored four times, including two goals for HJK in 1998–99 Champions League group stage.
