= Pauno Kymäläinen =

Finnish footballer and manager (born 1949)

Personal information
- Date of birth: 14 November 1949
- Place of birth: Rauma, Finland
- Height: 1.88 m (6 ft 2 in)
- Position: Defender

Senior career*
Years	Team	Apps	(Gls)
1967–1969	VG-62	–	(–)
1970	Pyrkivä Turku	–	(–)
1971–1986	TPS Turku	366	(22)

International career
1972–1986	Finland	30	(0)

Managerial career
- 1987–1990: PPT Pori
- 1993: TPS Turku
- * Club domestic league appearances and goals

Pauno Kymäläinen (born 14 November 1949) is a Finnish former footballer. He capped 30 times for the Finland national team.

== Career honors ==
- Finnish Championship: 1971, 1972, 1975
