= Seppo Sairanen =

Finnish football player and manager (1952–2026)

Personal information
- Date of birth: 23 March 1952
- Place of birth: Pori, Finland
- Date of death: 30 July 2026 (aged 74)
- Height: 1.83 m (6 ft 0 in)
- Position: Goalkeeper

Senior career*
Years	Team	Apps	(Gls)
1969–1975	Ässät		
1976–1977	Musan Salama		
1978–1979	Pyrkivä Turku		
1980–1983	FC Ilves		
1984	PPT Pori	4	

International career
1979–1980	Finland	6	(0)

Managerial career
- 1992: FC Jazz
- 2003–2004: FC Jazz
- 2007: MuSa
- * Club domestic league appearances and goals

Seppo Sairanen (23 March 1952 – 30 July 2026) was a Finnish football player and manager.

A goalkeeper, Sairanen played eight seasons and 150 matches in the Finnish premier division Mestaruussarja for Ässät, Pyrkivä, Ilves and PPT. He was later the head coach of Veikkausliiga club FC Jazz for three seasons. He capped six times for the Finland national team.

Sairanen died on 30 July 2026, at the age of 74.

== Honours ==
- Finnish Championship: 1983
