= FC Jazz =

Finnish football club

- Full name: Football Club Jazz
- Nickname: Jazz
- Founded: 22 September 1934; 92 years ago
- Stadium: Panda Turva Areena, Pori
- Manager: Risto Puustinen
- League: Ykkönen
- 2026: Ykkönen, 8th of 12
Home colours	Away colours

Football Club Jazz, commonly known as just Jazz, is a Finnish football club based in Pori, which plays in the Finnish third tier, Ykkönen. The club was founded in 1934 as Porin Pallo-Toverit. PPT changed its name to FC Jazz in November 1991.

FC Jazz is tied with several other clubs as the 13th most successful Finnish club by Finnish Championship titles. FC Jazz won the Finnish Championship twice (1993, 1996). Other medals for the club include Finnish Championship bronze (1992), Finnish Cup silver (1994) and Finnish League Cup silver (1994).

== History ==
=== PPT 1934–1991 ===
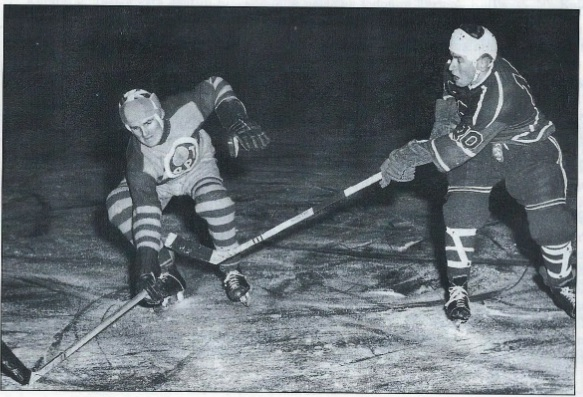
PPT's ice hockey player (left) and a Porin Karhut player (right)

FC Jazz was established in 1934 as Porin Pallo-Toverit (PPT for short) by 18 young men who had previously played football in the local sports club Pyrintö. The founders had strong labour movement background and PPT immediately joined the Finnish Workers' Sports Federation (TUL). PPT had also a section for bandy and ice hockey.

PPT played its first years in TUL regional series and after the second world war in TUL national divisions. The club made its debut in Finnish Football Association's national divisions in 1948 Suomensarja which was the second tier of Finnish football. After six more seasons in TUL series PPT joined the FA's divisions permanently in 1955 playing third or fourth tiers up to the 1980s. In 1982 PPT was promoted to 1. division and year later to the premier division Mestaruussarja.

=== FC Jazz 1991–present ===
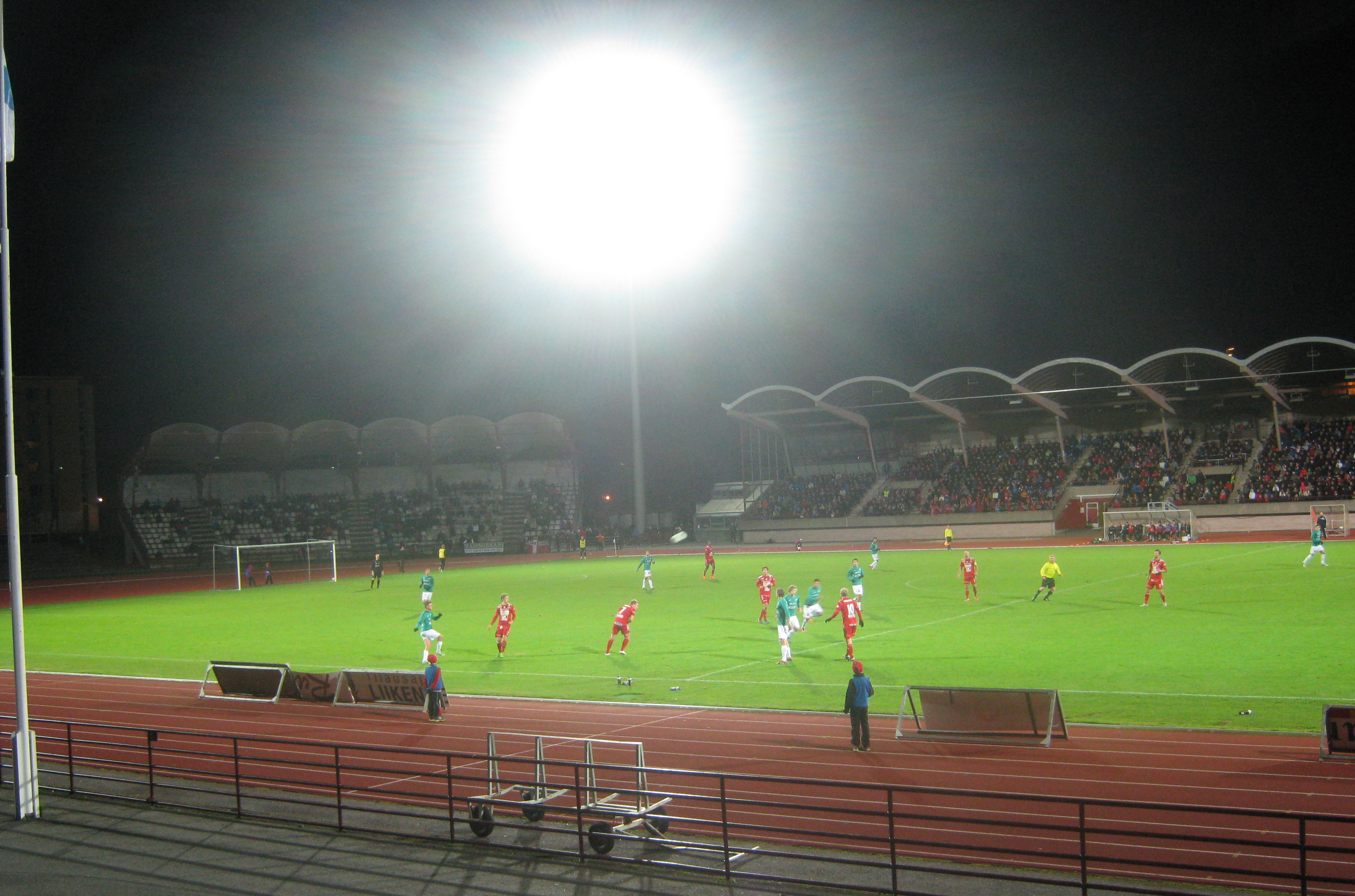
2013 promotion playoffs FC Jazz vs. Ekenäs IF at Pori Stadium.

In 1991 PPT changed its name for FC Jazz. The name was inspired by Pori Jazz festival, which is one of the most popular jazz festivals in Europe. FC Jazz won two Finnish championship titles in 1993 and 1996. The club was relegated to second tier in 2004, but the first team was dissolved 2005 as a result of financial problems.

FC Jazz youth section had been separated from the league organisation since 2002, and was known as FC Jazz-juniorit (FC Jazz-j). In 2006, the club started competing with the league license of its youth organisation, and were placed in the sixth-tier Vitonen, administrated by the Finnish Football Association Satakunta. Two years later, FC Jazz-j was promoted to third tier Kakkonen, which is the lowest national level in Finnish football. In 2010, FC Jazz-juniorit were allowed to start using the name FC Jazz. In 2013, FC Jazz was promoted to second-tier Ykkönen after beating Ekenäs IF 4–2 on aggregate in the promotion playoffs. FC Jazz was relegated back to the Kakkonen for the 2017 season, but got promoted back to Ykkönen, the new nation-wide third-tier, for the 2024 season. In 2024, the new second tier Ykkösliiga was founded and Ykkönen had been demoted one level in the Finnish football league system. In the inaugural season of the competition, Jazz finished 5th in Ykkönen. In 2026, Risto Puustinen was appointed as the new manager and signed a one-year contract.

=== Name changes ===
- Porin Pallo-Toverit (PPT, 1934–1991)
- FC Jazz (1991–present)

== Rivalries ==
FC Jazz's main rival is considered to be the other Pori club Musan Salama. The games between MuSa and Jazz are known as the Pori Derby. Other rival for Jazz is the Rauma club Pallo-Iirot.

== Honours ==
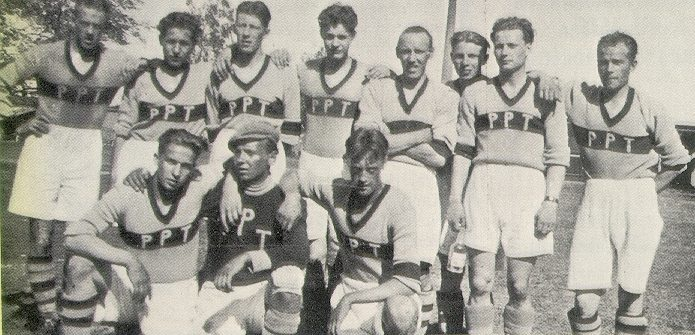
PPT 1940 squad.

- Finnish Championship:
  - Winners (2): 1993, 1996
- Finnish Cup:
  - Runners-up (1): 1995
- Finnish League Cup:
  - Runners-up (1): 1994

== Domestic competition record ==
Managers and Top Scorers
Season	Level	Manager	Top scorer
1980	Tier 4	(Finland) Pertti Lundell	(Finland) Jari Peltonen, 14
1981	Tier 4	(Finland) Pertti Lundell	(Finland) Risto Puustinen, 31
1982	Tier 3	(Finland) Pertti Lundell	(Finland) Risto Puustinen, 18
1983	Tier 2	(Finland) Pertti Lundell	(England) Richard Wilson, 19
1984	Tier 1	(Finland) Pertti Lundell	(England) Richard Wilson, 9
1985	Tier 1	(Finland) Pertti Lundell	(Finland) Mika Sankala, 7
1986	Tier 1	(Finland) Pertti Lundell	(Finland) Petri Järvinen, 8
1987	Tier 1	(Finland) Pauno Kymäläinen	(Finland) Jarmo Alatensiö, 10
1988	Tier 1	(Finland) Pauno Kymäläinen	(Finland) Seppo Sulonen, 7
1989	Tier 2	(Finland) Pauno Kymäläinen	(Soviet Union) Yuri Gavrilov, 9 (Finland) Saku Laaksonen
1990	Tier 2	(Finland) Pauno Kymäläinen, (Finland) Seppo Sairanen (9 August)	(Finland) Petri Toivonen, 12
1991	Tier 1	(Finland) Markku Wacklin	(Finland) Rami Nieminen, 15
1992	Tier 1	(Finland) Seppo Sairanen	(Brazil) Luiz Antônio, 21
1993	Tier 1	(Finland) Jussi Ristimäki	(Finland) Antti Sumiala, 20
1994	Tier 1	(Finland) Jussi Ristimäki	(Finland) Jukka Ruhanen, 12
1995	Tier 1	(Finland) Pertti Lundell	(Brazil) Luiz Antônio, 12
1996	Tier 1	(Finland) Jari Pyykölä	(Brazil) Luiz Antônio, 17
1997	Tier 1	(Finland) Jari Pyykölä, (Finland) Jukka Vakkila (11 August)	(Brazil) Marco, 9
1998	Tier 1	(Finland) Tapio Raatikainen, (Finland) Pertti Lundell (7 June)	(Brazil) Marco, 6 (Spain) Ricky (Brazil) Rodrigo
1999	Tier 1	(Finland) Pertti Lundell	(Sweden) Hasan Cetinkaya, 6 (Brazil) Marco
2000	Tier 1	(Finland) Pertti Lundell	(Finland) Matti Santahuhta, 6 (Peru) Hector Takayama
2001	Tier 1	(Finland) Jouni Joensuu, (Finland) Jussi Ristimäki (13 July)	(Brazil) Rodrigo, 8 (Finland) Antti Sumiala
2002	Tier 1	(Finland) Risto Virtanen, (Finland) Jussi Ristimäki (2 September)	(Brazil) Rodrigo, 8
2003	Tier 1	(Finland) Seppo Sairanen	(Brazil) Piracaia, 15
2004	Tier 1	(Finland) Seppo Sairanen, (Finland) Sami Rintanen (11 October)	(Finland) Mikael Muurimäki, 6 (Finland) Matti Santahuhta
2005			
2006	Tier 6	(Finland) Mikko Mannila	(Finland) Juuso Ollonqvist, 6 (Finland) Juho Wahlroos
2007	Tier 5	(Finland) Mikko Mannila	(Finland) Ville Kuusinen, 11
2008	Tier 4	(Finland) Mikko Mannila	(Brazil) João Gaetti, 11
2009	Tier 3	(Finland) Mikko Mannila	(Finland) Ari Qvist, 7
2010	Tier 3	(Finland) Mikko Mannila	(Ivory Coast) Mamadou Konate, 9
2011	Tier 3	(Finland) Risto Virtanen, (Finland) Jouni Joensuu (1 August)	(Finland) Jesse Junnila, 15
2012	Tier 3	(Finland) Matti Santahuhta	(Ivory Coast) Sekou Konate, 14
2013	Tier 3	(Finland) Matti Santahuhta	(Finland) Samu-Petteri Mäkelä, 14
2014	Tier 2	(Finland) Jouni Joensuu, (Finland) Jani Uotinen (5 August)	(Cyprus) Alekos Alekou, 14
2015	Tier 2	(Wales) John Allen	(Finland) Samu-Petteri Mäkelä, 8
2016	Tier 2	(Wales) John Allen (Finland) Jani Uotinen (21 July)	(Spain) Dani Sánchez, 9
2017	Tier 3	(Finland) Olli Oravisto	(Finland) Juho Lehtonen, 16
2018	Tier 3	(Finland) Olli Oravisto	(Nigeria) Iyam Friday, 5 (Finland) Joonas Meura, 5
2019	Tier 3	(Ghana) Seth Ablade	

Season to season of FC Jazz

Season	Level	Division	Section	Administration	Position	Movements
1948	Tier 2	Suomensarja (Finland Series)	North Group	Finnish FA (Suomen Pallolitto)	10th	Relegated
1949	Tier 3	Suomensarjan karsinnat	Cup format	Finnish FA (Suomen Pallolitto)	1st round	Qualifications for 2nd level as a TUL Club
1950						Unknown
1951						Unknown
1952						Unknown
1953	Tier 3	Suomensarjan karsinnat	West Group	Finnish FA (Suomen Pallolitto)	7th	Qualifications for 2nd level as a TUL Club
1954	Tier 3	Maakuntasarja (Regional League)	West Group I	Finnish FA (Suomen Pallolitto)	5th	Relegated
1955	Tier 4	Piirisarja (District League)		Satakunta District (SPL Satakunta)		Play-offs, Promoted
1956	Tier 3	Maakuntasarja (Regional League)	West Group I	Finnish FA (Suomen Pallolitto)	5th	
1957	Tier 3	Maakuntasarja (Regional League)	West Group II	Finnish FA (Suomen Pallolitto)	6th	
1958	Tier 3	Maakuntasarja (Regional League)	Group 4	Finnish FA (Suomen Pallolitto)	6th	
1959	Tier 3	Maakuntasarja (Regional League)	Group 5	Finnish FA (Suomen Pallolitto)	5th	
1960	Tier 3	Maakuntasarja (Regional League)	Group 4	Finnish FA (Suomen Pallolitto)	8th	Relegated
1961	Tier 4	Aluesarja (Area Series)	Group 11	Finnish FA (Suomen Pallolitto)	2nd	
1962	Tier 4	Aluesarja (Area Series)	Group 11	Finnish FA (Suomen Pallolitto)	1st	Promoted
1963	Tier 3	Maakuntasarja (Regional League)	Group 3	Finnish FA (Suomen Pallolitto)	4th	
1964	Tier 3	Maakuntasarja (Regional League)	Group 4	Finnish FA (Suomen Pallolitto)	4th	
1965	Tier 3	Maakuntasarja (Regional League)	Group 4	Finnish FA (Suomen Pallolitto)	1st	Promoted
1966	Tier 2	Suomensarja (Finland Series)	West Group	Finnish FA (Suomen Pallolitto)	7th	
1967	Tier 2	Suomensarja (Finland Series)	West Group	Finnish FA (Suomen Pallolitto)	5th	
1968	Tier 2	Suomensarja (Finland Series)	West Group	Finnish FA (Suomen Pallolitto)	8th	
1969	Tier 2	Suomensarja (Finland Series)	West Group	Finnish FA (Suomen Pallolitto)	7th	
1970	Tier 2	2. Divisioona (Second Division)	West Group	Finnish FA (Suomen Pallolitto)	3rd	
1971	Tier 2	2. Divisioona (Second Division)	West Group	Finnish FA (Suomen Pallolitto)	4th	
1972	Tier 2	2. Divisioona (Second Division)	West Group	Finnish FA (Suomen Pallolitto)	10th	Remained in Second Division which became third tier
1973	Tier 3	2. Divisioona (Second Division)	West Group	Finnish FA (Suomen Pallolitto)	4th	
1974	Tier 3	2. Divisioona (Second Division)	West Group	Finnish FA (Suomen Pallolitto)	10th	Relegated
1975	Tier 4	3. Divisioona (Third Division)	Group 4	Finnish FA (Suomen Pallolitto)	1st	Promoted
1976	Tier 3	2. Divisioona (Second Division)	West Group	Finnish FA (Suomen Pallolitto)	12th	Relegated
1977	Tier 4	3. Divisioona (Third Division)	Group 4	Finnish FA (Suomen Pallolitto)	7th	
1978	Tier 4	3. Divisioona (Third Division)	Group 4	Finnish FA (Suomen Pallolitto)	7th	
1979	Tier 4	3. Divisioona (Third Division)	Group 4	Finnish FA (Suomen Pallolitto)	3rd	
1980	Tier 4	3. Divisioona (Third Division)	Group 4	Finnish FA (Suomen Pallolitto)	8th	
1981	Tier 4	3. Divisioona (Third Division)	Group 4 Satakunta	Finnish FA (Suomen Pallolitto)	1st	Promotion Playoffs, Promoted
1982	Tier 3	2. Divisioona (Second Division)	West Group	Finnish FA (Suomen Pallolitto)	1st	Promotion Playoff - Promoted
1983	Tier 2	1. Divisioona (First Division)		Finnish FA (Suomen Pallolitto)	2nd	Promotion/relegation League 4th - Promoted
1984	Tier 1	Mestaruussarja		Finnish FA (Suomen Palloliitto	12th	Relegated
1985	Tier 1	SM-sarja (Premier League)		Finnish FA (Suomen Palloliitto	9th	
1986	Tier 1	SM-sarja (Premier League)		Finnish FA (Suomen Palloliitto	8th	
1987	Tier 1	SM-sarja (Premier League)		Finnish FA (Suomen Palloliitto	6th	
1988	Tier 1	SM-sarja (Premier League)		Finnish FA (Suomen Palloliitto	12th	Relegated
1989	Tier 2	1. Divisioona (First Division)		Finnish FA (Suomen Pallolitto)	4th	
1990	Tier 2	1. Divisioona (First Division)		Finnish FA (Suomen Pallolitto)	1st	Promoted
1991	Tier 1	Futisliiga (Premier League)		Finnish FA (Suomen Palloliitto	8th	
1992	Tier 1	Veikkausliiga (Premier League)		Finnish FA (Suomen Palloliitto	3rd	First season as Jazz
1993	Tier 1	Veikkausliiga (Premier League)		Finnish FA (Suomen Palloliitto	1st	Champions
1994	Tier 1	Veikkausliiga (Premier League)		Finnish FA (Suomen Palloliitto	4th	
1995	Tier 1	Veikkausliiga (Premier League)		Finnish FA (Suomen Palloliitto	4th	
1996	Tier 1	Veikkausliiga (Premier League)		Finnish FA (Suomen Palloliitto	1st	Champions
1997	Tier 1	Veikkausliiga (Premier League)		Finnish FA (Suomen Palloliitto	7th	
1998	Tier 1	Veikkausliiga (Premier League)		Finnish FA (Suomen Palloliitto	5th	
1999	Tier 1	Veikkausliiga (Premier League)		Finnish FA (Suomen Palloliitto	6th	
2000	Tier 1	Veikkausliiga (Premier League)		Finnish FA (Suomen Palloliitto	5th	
2001	Tier 1	Veikkausliiga (Premier League)		Finnish FA (Suomen Palloliitto	10th	
2002	Tier 1	Veikkausliiga (Premier League)		Finnish FA (Suomen Palloliitto	12th	Promotion/Relegation League 5th
2003	Tier 1	Veikkausliiga (Premier League)		Finnish FA (Suomen Palloliitto	12th	
2004	Tier 1	Veikkausliiga (Premier League)		Finnish FA (Suomen Palloliitto	13th	Relegation Playoff - Relegated
2005						Bankruptcy
2006	Tier 6	Vitonen (Fifth Division)	Satakunta	Satakunta District (SPL Satakunta)	1st	Promoted
2007	Tier 5	Nelonen (Fourth Division)	Group 2	Satakunta District (SPL Satakunta)	1st	Promoted
2008	Tier 4	Kolmonen (Third Division)	Satakunta	Satakunta District (SPL Satakunta)	1st	Promotion Playoffs, Promoted
2009	Tier 3	Kakkonen (Second Division)	Group B	Finnish FA (Suomen Pallolitto)	10th	
2010	Tier 3	Kakkonen (Second Division)	Group B	Finnish FA (Suomen Pallolitto)	10th	
2011	Tier 3	Kakkonen (Second Division)	Group B	Finnish FA (Suomen Pallolitto)	7th	
2012	Tier 3	Kakkonen (Second Division)	Western Group	Finnish FA (Suomen Pallolitto)	2nd	
2013	Tier 3	Kakkonen (Second Division)	Western Group	Finnish FA (Suomen Pallolitto)	1st	Promotion Playoff - Promoted
2014	Tier 2	Ykkönen (First Division)		Finnish FA (Suomen Pallolitto)	8th	
2015	Tier 2	Ykkönen (First Division)		Finnish FA (Suomen Pallolitto)	7th	
2016	Tier 2	Ykkönen (First Division)		Finnish FA (Suomen Pallolitto)	12th	Relegated
2017	Tier 3	Kakkonen (Second Division)	Group B	Finnish FA (Suomen Pallolitto)	8th	
2018	Tier 3	Kakkonen (Second Division)	Group B	Finnish FA (Suomen Pallolitto)	7th	
2019	Tier 3	Kakkonen (Second Division)	Group B	Finnish FA (Suomen Pallolitto)	8th	
2020	Tier 3	Kakkonen (Second Division)	Group B	Finnish FA (Suomen Pallolitto)	2nd	
2021	Tier 3	Kakkonen (Second Division)	Group B	Finnish FA (Suomen Pallolitto)	3rd	
2022	Tier 3	Kakkonen (Second Division)	Group B	Finnish FA (Suomen Pallolitto)	5th	
2023	Tier 3	Kakkonen (Second Division)	Group B	Finnish FA (Suomen Pallolitto)	2nd	Promoted
2024	Tier 3	Ykkönen (First Division)		Finnish FA (Suomen Pallolitto)	6th	
2025	Tier 3	Ykkönen (First Division)		Finnish FA (Suomen Pallolitto)		

- 19 seasons in Veikkausliiga
- 14 seasons in Second Tier
- 29 seasons in Third Tier
- 10 seasons in Fourth Tier
- 1 season in 5th Tier
- 1 season in 6th Tier

== European competitions ==
UEFA Champions League:

Season	Round	Club	Home	Away	Aggregate
1997–1998	1st qualifying round	(Estonia) FC Lantana	2–0	1–0	3–0
1997–1998	2nd qualifying round	(Netherlands) Feyenoord	1–2	2–6	3–8

UEFA Cup:

Season	Round	Club	Home	Away	Aggregate
1994–95	Preliminary round	(Denmark) FC Copenhagen	0–4	1–0	1–4
1996–97	Preliminary round	(Faroe Islands) GÍ Gøta	3–1	1–0	4–1
1996–97	Qualifying round	(Russia) Dynamo Moscow	1–3	1–1	2–4
1997–98	1st round	(Germany) 1860 Munich	0–1	1–6	1–7

UEFA Intertoto Cup:

Season	Round	Club	Home	Away	Aggregate
2001	1st round	(Romania) Gloria Bistrița	1–0	1–2	2–2
2001	2nd round	(France) Paris Saint-Germain	1–4	0–3	1–7

== Current squad ==
As of 22 August 2026

Note: Flags indicate national team as defined under FIFA eligibility rules; some limited exceptions apply. Players may hold more than one non-FIFA nationality.

No.	Pos.	Nation	Player
1	GK	FIN	Tino Kangasaho
2	DF	FIN	Jussi Lemio
3	DF	FIN	Josep Nuorela
4	DF	FIN	Alex Luhtanen
5	DF	FIN	Joonas Lakkamäki
6	DF	FIN	Nehir Aydin
7	MF	FIN	Christian Harjanne
8	MF	FIN	Einari Kaipainen
9	FW	FIN	Eero Lamberg
12	FW	FIN	Emil Väre
13	MF	FIN	Elias Ruusuvuori
14	DF	FIN	Juuso Marttila

No.	Pos.	Nation	Player
15	FW	FIN	Arttu Furuholm
16	DF	FIN	Jegor Petrishin
17	MF	FIN	Luka Nuorela
19	FW	FIN	Felix Lamminen
20	DF	FIN	Eeli Tuominen
21	FW	FIN	Niilo-Olavi Puustinen
22	FW	CAN	Joshua Pulla
23	DF	FIN	Lenni Olejniczak
26	GK	FIN	Arttu Takala
29	DF	FIN	Patrik Raitanen
31	GK	FIN	Mikael Ojanen
32	GK	FIN	Jiri Riihelä

=== Farm team ===
Euran Pallo of the Finnish fifth division Kolmonen works as FC Jazz's farm team.

== Former players ==
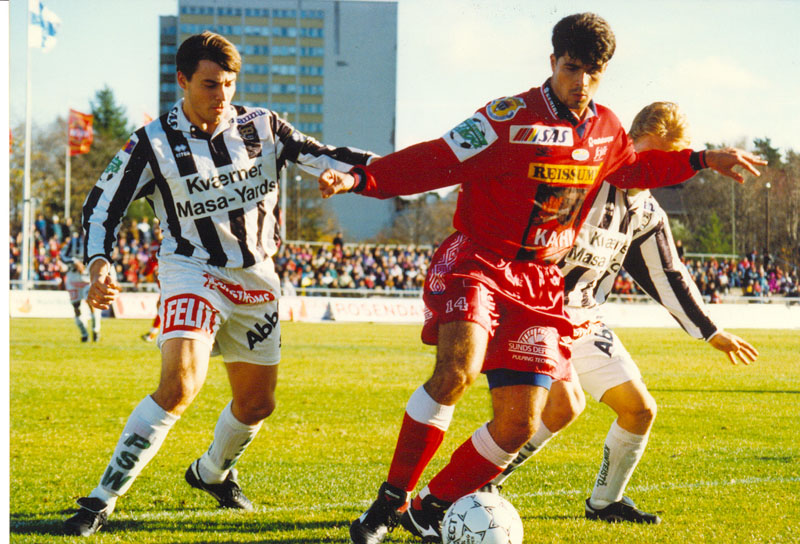
Two-time Veikkausliiga top scorer Luiz Antônio in 1996.

All following players who have represented FC Jazz have been capped at least once by their respective national team's first squad.

- (Finland) Jarmo Alatensiö
- (Cyprus) Alekos Alekou
- (Ghana) Masahudu Alhassan
- (El Salvador) Víctor Dubón
- (Niger) Kourouma Fatoukouma
- (Finland) Timo Furuholm
- (Soviet Union) Yuri Gavrilov
- (Finland) Rami Hakanpää
- (Finland) Jarno Heinikangas
- (Finland) Petri Helin
- (Finland) Janne Hietanen
- (Finland) Miika Juntunen
- (Finland) Petri Järvinen
- (Finland) Toni Kallio
- (Finland) Lasse Karjalainen
- (Finland) Aleksandr Kokko
- (Finland) Peter Kopteff
- (Finland) Saku Laaksonen
- (Finland) Jarmo Manninen
- (The Gambia) Matthew Mendy
- (Finland) Janne Mäkelä
- (Finland) Rami Nieminen
- (Finland) Juha Pasoja
- (Finland) Jon Poulsen
- (Finland) Risto Puustinen
- (Finland) Juha Riippa
- (Finland) Jukka Ruhanen
- (Finland) Seppo Sairanen
- (Finland) Petri Sulonen
- (Finland) Antti Sumiala
- (Finland) Janne Suokonautio
- (Finland) Kim Suominen
- (Finland) Jani Viander
- (Finland) Hermanni Vuorinen
- (Finland) Ville Väisänen
