= 2000 Veikkausliiga =

Veikkausliiga
- Season: 2000

Statistics of Veikkausliiga in the 2000 season.

== Overview ==
Location of teams in Veikkausliiga 2000

It was contested by 12 teams, and Haka Valkeakoski won the championship.

== League standings ==
Pos	Team	Pld	W	D	L	GF	GA	GD	Pts	Qualification or relegation
1	Haka Valkeakoski (C)	33	20	6	7	56	20	+36	66	Qualification to Champions League first qualifying round
2	FC Jokerit	33	16	14	3	56	26	+30	62	Qualification to UEFA Cup qualifying round
3	MyPa Anjalankoski	33	18	7	8	50	34	+16	61	Qualification to UEFA Cup qualifying round
4	HJK	33	16	9	8	51	33	+18	57	Qualification to UEFA Cup qualifying round
5	FC Jazz Pori	33	14	11	8	41	32	+9	53	Qualification to Intertoto Cup first round
6	Tampere United	33	12	10	11	48	52	−4	46	
7	FC Inter Turku	33	11	7	15	47	54	−7	40	
8	FC Lahti	33	10	9	14	36	35	+1	39	
9	RoPS	33	10	6	17	35	50	−15	36	
10	VPS Vaasa	33	8	10	15	38	42	−4	34	
11	TPS Turku (R)	33	7	6	20	30	75	−45	27	Qualification to relegation play-offs
12	KTP Kotka (R)	33	5	7	21	29	64	−35	22	Relegation to Ykkönen

Source: rsssf.com
(C) Champions; (R) Relegated

== Results ==
Each team plays three times against every other team, either twice at home and once away or once at home and twice away, for a total of 33 matches played each.

=== Matches 1–22 ===
Home \ Away	HAK	HJK	INT	JAZ	JOK	KTP	LAH	MYP	RPS	TAM	TPS	VPS
FC Haka		1–0	5–1	0–1	0–0	0–0	1–0	1–0	2–1	3–0	1–1	0–1
HJK Helsinki	1–0		3–2	0–0	0–3	4–1	0–0	3–2	3–0	0–0	4–0	2–1
Inter Turku	1–4	0–0		1–1	1–1	0–2	3–0	1–2	1–1	3–0	1–0	1–1
Jazz	1–0	1–2	1–3		1–1	1–0	0–0	1–0	1–0	3–0	3–0	1–0
Jokerit	2–0	2–1	1–1	1–1		2–1	3–1	2–2	2–0	3–3	4–0	0–2
KTP	1–2	1–2	1–0	0–1	0–5		1–3	0–3	2–3	4–4	2–2	1–1
Lahti	1–0	1–0	1–3	0–1	1–1	2–3		0–0	0–2	1–0	1–2	0–3
MyPa	1–0	1–1	2–1	1–1	2–1	2–0	1–0		1–0	0–2	2–0	1–0
RoPS	1–1	0–5	2–0	4–1	2–3	0–0	0–0	1–0		1–2	1–0	1–4
Tampere United	0–4	1–1	1–0	1–1	1–1	2–0	0–0	3–1	4–1		0–2	3–3
TPS	0–3	2–1	1–4	3–3	1–4	0–2	1–0	1–1	1–0	3–2		1–1
VPS	2–3	1–2	0–1	0–2	0–0	1–1	0–2	0–1	1–3	0–1	1–1	

Legend: Blue = home team win; Yellow = draw; Red = away team win.

=== Matches 23–33 ===
Home \ Away	HAK	HJK	INT	JAZ	JOK	KTP	LAH	MYP	RPS	TAM	TPS	VPS
FC Haka		2–0		2–1		4–0		5–2		4–0		1–0
HJK Helsinki			2–2	2–1	1–2		0–0				3–1	3–0
Inter Turku	0–1			2–1		1–0		5–1		2–5	2–0	
Jazz					0–0	2–0		2–2	2–0		4–1	1–1
Jokerit	0–0		3–2				0–0		3–0	1–0	4–1	
KTP		1–2			0–1		1–6		1–1			0–2
Lahti	1–1		4–1	3–0						0–1	3–1	
MyPa		3–1			1–0	2–0	1–0		3–0			4–0
RoPS	0–2	0–0	5–0				1–3			3–0		
Tampere United		1–2		2–0		3–2		1–1				1–1
TPS	0–3					0–1		1–4	2–0	1–4		
VPS			2–1		0–0		3–2		0–1		6–0	

Legend: Blue = home team win; Yellow = draw; Red = away team win.

== Attendances ==
No.	Club	Average
1	HJK	3,976
2	Jokerit	3,247
3	VPS	2,443
4	Tampere	2,382
5	TPS	2,182
6	Haka	2,070
7	Jazz	1,781
8	MyPa	1,682
9	Inter Turku	1,645
10	KooTeePee	1,524
11	RoPS	1,471
12	Lahti	1,325
