= 1994 Veikkausliiga =

Veikkausliiga
- Season: 1994
- Champions: TPV Tampere

Statistics of Veikkausliiga in the 1994 season.

== Overview ==
It was contested by 14 teams, and TPV Tampere won the championship.

== League standings ==
Pos	Team	Pld	W	D	L	GF	GA	GD	Pts	Qualification or relegation
1	TPV Tampere (C)	26	16	4	6	46	27	+19	52	Qualification to UEFA Cup preliminary round
2	MyPa Anjalankoski	26	15	5	6	49	21	+28	50	Qualification to UEFA Cup preliminary round
3	HJK Helsinki	26	12	7	7	40	29	+11	43	Qualification to Intertoto Cup group stage
4	FC Jazz Pori	26	13	3	10	49	36	+13	42	
5	RoPS Rovaniemi	26	10	8	8	32	32	0	38	
6	Haka Valkeakoski	26	11	4	11	37	30	+7	37	
7	Jaro Jakobstad	26	10	7	9	35	39	−4	37	
8	TPS Turku	26	9	7	10	38	34	+4	34	Qualification to Cup Winners' Cup qualifying round (Note: TPS Turku as winners of the 1994 Finnish Cup qualified for the qualifying round of the 1995–96 Cup Winners' Cup.)
9	Kuusysi Lahti	26	10	4	12	42	49	−7	34	
10	FinnPa Helsinki	26	8	9	9	25	35	−10	33	
11	MP Mikkeli	26	7	8	11	25	31	−6	29	
12	Ilves Tampere	26	7	7	12	35	45	−10	28	
13	FC Oulu (R)	26	6	9	11	32	42	−10	27	Relegation to Ykkönen
14	KuPS Kuopio (R)	26	6	2	18	24	59	−35	20	Relegation to Ykkönen

Source: rsssf.com
(C) Champions; (R) Relegated

== Results ==
Home \ Away	FPA	HAK	HJK	ILV	JAR	JAZ	KPS	KUU	MP	MYP	OUL	RPS	TPS	TPV
FinnPa		1–0	2–1	2–2	2–1	1–0	1–2	0–0	0–1	1–1	1–1	2–2	0–2	0–4
FC Haka	1–1		1–2	0–2	0–1	4–0	4–2	0–1	1–0	3–1	2–1	5–1	1–4	0–0
HJK Helsinki	1–1	0–2		2–0	0–1	1–2	0–0	2–2	3–0	1–0	1–1	0–0	3–0	5–0
Ilves	3–0	1–4	0–1		2–2	2–0	1–2	2–4	1–1	2–2	4–1	0–1	2–1	0–3
Jaro	2–1	1–1	1–3	2–1		1–3	4–2	2–1	1–0	0–0	2–1	2–2	1–1	1–2
Jazz	0–2	3–1	3–0	1–3	2–2		2–0	7–2	2–1	2–0	6–1	2–0	0–1	0–3
KuPS	1–2	0–3	0–2	1–0	1–3	2–1		0–2	2–0	0–2	2–3	1–2	1–5	2–1
Kuusysi	2–3	3–1	0–1	3–0	3–0	3–3	1–0		3–0	0–4	1–2	2–1	1–0	0–3
MP	0–0	2–0	5–1	1–1	0–0	0–1	2–1	2–1		0–2	1–1	1–1	3–0	2–1
MyPa	3–0	0–1	1–1	4–1	4–1	1–0	8–0	2–2	2–0		1–0	1–0	3–1	1–0
Oulu	0–0	1–1	2–4	2–2	2–0	1–1	0–0	5–0	2–0	1–3		1–0	1–2	0–2
RoPS	2–1	1–0	0–1	3–0	2–1	1–4	3–2	2–1	1–1	0–1	3–1		2–0	0–0
TPS	0–1	0–1	2–2	1–0	0–1	1–3	4–0	4–2	2–2	2–1	0–0	1–1		3–0
TPV	3–0	1–0	3–2	1–2	3–2	2–1	3–0	3–2	1–0	2–1	3–1	1–1	1–1	

Legend: Blue = home team win; Yellow = draw; Red = away team win.

== Attendances ==
No.	Club	Average
1	HJK	3,224
2	Jazz	2,820
3	TPV	2,486
4	MyPa	2,005
5	FinnPa	1,915
6	TPS	1,796
7	Haka	1,752
8	Kuusysi	1,703
9	Jaro	1,674
10	Ilves	1,633
11	RoPS	1,528
12	Oulu	1,377
13	KuPS	1,320
14	MP	1,173

== See also ==
- Ykkönen (Tier 2)
