= 1996 Veikkausliiga =

Veikkausliiga
- Season: 1996

Statistics of Veikkausliiga in the 1996 season.

== Overview ==
It was contested by 12 teams, and FC Jazz Pori won the championship.

== Preliminary stage ==
=== Table ===
Pos	Team	Pld	W	D	L	GF	GA	GD	Pts	Qualification
1	FF Jaro	22	11	4	7	29	17	+12	37	Qualification to Championship group
2	Jazz	22	10	7	5	40	29	+11	37	Qualification to Championship group
3	TPS	22	11	4	7	31	29	+2	37	Qualification to Championship group
4	FinnPa	22	9	8	5	27	20	+7	35	Qualification to Championship group
5	Inter Turku	22	10	5	7	24	20	+4	35	Qualification to Championship group
6	MyPa	22	10	3	9	39	32	+7	33	Qualification to Championship group
7	VPS	22	8	5	9	22	20	+2	29	Qualification to Relegation group
8	HJK	22	8	4	10	26	30	−4	28	Qualification to Relegation group
9	RoPS	22	7	6	9	22	23	−1	27	Qualification to Relegation group
10	Ilves	22	7	6	9	22	30	−8	27	Qualification to Relegation group
11	Haka	22	6	6	10	28	34	−6	24	Qualification to Relegation group
12	MP	22	4	4	14	12	38	−26	16	Qualification to Relegation group

Source: rsssf.com

=== Results ===
Home \ Away	FPA	HAK	HJK	ILV	INT	JAR	JAZ	MP	MYP	RPS	TPS	VPS
FinnPa		2–1	0–2	2–0	0–1	1–1	1–0	0–0	4–2	0–0	4–1	0–0
FC Haka	2–1		2–1	2–0	1–1	0–1	2–3	1–1	2–6	2–1	5–1	1–2
HJK	2–3	2–1		1–1	1–0	1–0	2–5	1–0	1–2	0–0	3–4	1–0
Ilves	0–0	2–2	0–0		2–1	1–0	0–0	3–0	1–0	0–1	2–4	1–2
Inter Turku	0–1	1–0	2–0	1–2		1–0	1–1	0–0	1–0	2–1	1–2	2–0
FF Jaro	1–1	3–1	0–0	0–1	0–1		4–0	4–0	0–1	2–0	2–0	2–2
Jazz	2–1	0–2	4–1	3–3	4–1	4–1		0–0	2–2	3–1	4–2	1–0
MP	0–3	2–0	0–4	1–2	0–1	1–3	1–3		1–4	1–0	1–2	1–0
MyPa	2–3	1–1	3–1	1–0	2–4	1–2	3–1	3–0		2–0	2–1	0–1
RoPS	3–0	0–0	0–2	3–1	1–1	0–1	0–0	3–1	2–1		0–2	3–0
TPS	0–0	0–0	1–0	1–0	1–1	0–1	1–0	0–1	3–0	1–1		2–0
VPS	0–0	3–0	2–0	5–0	1–0	0–1	0–0	1–0	1–1	1–2	1–2	

Legend: Blue = home team win; Yellow = draw; Red = away team win.

== Championship group ==
=== Table ===
Pos	Team	Pld	W	D	L	GF	GA	GD	Pts	Qualification
1	Jazz (C)	27	13	8	6	47	33	+14	47	Qualification to Champions League first qualifying round
2	MyPa	27	14	3	10	48	38	+10	45	Qualification to UEFA Cup first qualifying round
3	TPS	27	13	5	9	40	35	+5	44	Qualification to Intertoto Cup group stage
4	FinnPa	27	11	9	7	32	25	+7	42	
5	FF Jaro	27	11	6	10	34	25	+9	39	
6	Inter Turku	27	11	6	10	28	30	−2	39	

Source: rsssf.com
(C) Champions

=== Results ===
Home \ Away	FPA	INT	JAR	JAZ	MYP	TPS
FinnPa		3–0			0–1	
Inter Turku			2–2			2–1
FF Jaro	1–2			0–1	1–2	
Jazz	0–0	1–0				3–1
MyPa		3–0		3–2		
TPS	3–0		1–1		3–0	

Legend: Blue = home team win; Yellow = draw; Red = away team win.

== Relegation group ==
=== Table ===
Pos	Team	Pld	W	D	L	GF	GA	GD	Pts	Qualification or relegation
1	VPS	27	12	5	10	33	25	+8	41	
2	RoPS	27	11	6	10	35	29	+6	39	
3	HJK (O)	27	11	5	11	36	37	−1	38	Cup Winners' Cup qualifying round and relegation play-offs (Note: HJK Helsinki as winners of the 1996 Finnish Cup qualified for the qualifying round of the 1997–98 Cup Winners' Cup.)
4	Ilves (R)	27	8	6	13	26	43	−17	30	Relegation to Ykkönen
5	Haka (R)	27	7	6	14	35	42	−7	27	Relegation to Ykkönen
6	MP (R)	27	5	5	17	18	50	−32	20	Relegation to Ykkönen

Source: rsssf.com
(O) Play-off winners; (R) Relegated

=== Results ===
Home \ Away	HAK	HJK	ILV	MP	RPS	VPS
Haka				5–2		0–1
HJK	2–1		1–0			4–2
Ilves	2–1			1–2		
MP		1–1			1–2	
RoPS	1–0	3–2	6–1			
VPS			3–0	3–0	2–1	

Legend: Blue = home team win; Yellow = draw; Red = away team win.

== Attendances ==
No.	Club	Average
1	HJK	4,159
2	VPS	3,419
3	Jazz	2,481
4	Inter Turku	2,471
5	FinnPa	2,263
6	TPS	2,199
7	MyPa	2,088
8	Haka	2,002
9	Ilves	1,951
10	RoPS	1,732
11	Jaro	1,716
12	MP	941

== See also ==
- Ykkönen (Tier 2)
- Suomen Cup 1996
