= 1993 Veikkausliiga =

Veikkausliiga
- Season: 1993
- Champions: FC Jazz Pori

This article contains statistics of Veikkausliiga in the 1993 season.

== Overview ==
Preliminary Stage is performed in 12 teams, and higher 8 teams go into Championship Group. Lower 4 teams fought in promotion/relegation group with higher 4 teams of Ykkönen.

FC Jazz Pori won the championship.

== Preliminary stage ==
=== Table ===
Pos	Team	Pld	W	D	L	GF	GA	GD	Pts	Qualification
1	FC Jazz Pori	22	12	5	5	50	28	+22	41	Qualification to Championship group
2	MyPa Anjalankoski	22	11	6	5	31	20	+11	39	Qualification to Championship group
3	HJK Helsinki	22	12	3	7	27	17	+10	39	Qualification to Championship group
4	FinnPa Helsinki	22	11	5	6	34	23	+11	38	Qualification to Championship group
5	TPV Tampere	22	10	6	6	34	29	+5	36	Qualification to Championship group
6	Kuusysi Lahti	22	11	3	8	30	34	−4	36	Qualification to Championship group
7	TPS Turku	22	8	4	10	25	26	−1	28	Qualification to Championship group
8	RoPS Rovaniemi	22	8	3	11	22	25	−3	27	Qualification to Championship group
9	MP Mikkeli	22	7	5	10	32	32	0	26	Qualification to Relegation group
10	Haka Valkeakoski	22	7	4	11	27	36	−9	25	Qualification to Relegation group
11	Jaro Jakobstad	22	5	6	11	17	26	−9	21	Qualification to Relegation group
12	Ilves Tampere	22	3	4	15	22	55	−33	13	Qualification to Relegation group

=== Results ===
Home \ Away	FPA	HAK	HJK	ILV	JAR	JAZ	KUU	MP	MYP	RPS	TPS	TPV
FinnPa		1–1	1–0	0–2	3–0	2–0	1–1	2–0	3–0	5–2	2–1	1–2
FC Haka	0–0		1–3	6–0	2–0	0–2	0–2	1–0	2–1	2–0	2–0	1–3
HJK Helsinki	0–2	2–1		4–0	0–0	1–0	0–0	1–0	0–2	2–1	3–2	0–2
Ilves	2–0	1–1	1–3		0–3	2–4	2–4	0–1	1–2	1–1	1–1	2–4
Jaro	1–0	0–1	0–1	1–1		0–1	3–1	1–1	0–1	1–0	2–3	0–0
Jazz	3–1	5–1	0–2	4–0	0–0		7–1	5–3	2–2	3–2	1–0	1–1
Kuusysi	1–3	2–1	1–0	2–1	3–1	2–1		2–3	2–0	2–1	1–0	0–1
MP	0–0	6–0	0–0	5–1	1–1	2–5	5–0		1–1	1–0	0–1	3–1
MyPa	2–0	3–1	1–0	4–0	1–0	1–3	1–1	3–0		0–1	3–1	0–0
RoPS	1–2	1–0	0–1	1–0	0–2	2–0	1–0	3–0	1–1		1–0	2–0
TPS	3–3	1–0	2–0	1–2	3–0	1–1	2–1	1–0	0–1	0–0		0–1
TPV	1–2	3–3	0–4	3–2	3–1	2–2	0–1	3–0	1–1	2–1	1–2	

Legend: Blue = home team win; Yellow = draw; Red = away team win.

== Championship group ==
=== Table ===
Pos	Team	Pld	W	D	L	GF	GA	GD	Pts	Qualification
1	FC Jazz Pori (C)	29	17	7	5	67	33	+34	58	Qualification to UEFA Cup preliminary round
2	MyPa Anjalankoski	29	16	6	7	47	33	+14	54	Qualification to UEFA Cup preliminary round
3	HJK Helsinki	29	15	4	10	34	26	+8	49	Qualification to Cup Winners' Cup qualifying round (Note: HJK Helsinki as winners of the 1993 Finnish Cup qualified for the qualifying round of the 1994–95 Cup Winners' Cup.)
4	Kuusysi Lahti	29	14	5	10	41	44	−3	47	
5	FinnPa Helsinki	29	13	7	9	45	35	+10	46	
6	TPV Tampere	29	10	8	11	38	39	−1	38	
7	RoPS Rovaniemi	29	11	5	13	32	35	−3	38	
8	TPS Turku	29	9	5	15	31	39	−8	32	

(C) Champions

=== Results ===
Home \ Away	FPA	HJK	JAZ	KUU	MYP	RPS	TPS	TPV
FinnPa				0–3	6–1		0–2	2–0
HJK Helsinki	0–0		0–2			0–2		1–0
Jazz	4–1				6–3		2–0	1–1
Kuusysi		1–2	0–0			2–2		
MyPa		2–0		3–0		3–0	2–0	
RoPS	2–2		0–2					1–0
TPS		2–4		1–2		1–3		
TPV				2–3	1–2		0–0	

Legend: Blue = home team win; Yellow = draw; Red = away team win.

== Promotion/relegation group ==
=== Table ===
Pos	Team	Pld	W	D	L	GF	GA	GD	Pts	Promotion
1	MP Mikkeli	7	4	3	0	19	7	+12	15	
2	Jaro Pietarsaari	7	4	2	1	9	5	+4	14	
3	KuPS Kuopio (P)	7	3	2	2	15	10	+5	11	Promotion to Veikkausliiga
4	Haka Valkeakoski	7	3	1	3	13	11	+2	10	
5	FC Oulu (P)	7	3	1	3	10	10	0	10	Promotion to Veikkausliiga
6	Ilves Tampere	7	2	3	2	5	7	−2	9	
7	KajHa Kajaani	7	2	1	4	7	12	−5	7	
8	KontU Helsinki	7	0	1	6	4	20	−16	1	

(P) Promoted

NB: Top six to Premier Division 1994, the rest to Division One 1994.

== Attendances ==
No.	Club	Average
1	Jazz	4,065
2	HJK	3,572
3	FinnPa	2,986
4	TPV	2,820
5	TPS	2,602
6	Ilves	2,107
7	MyPa	1,976
8	Kuusysi	1,900
9	MP	1,775
10	Jaro	1,640
11	RoPS	1,623
12	Haka	1,235

== See also ==
- Ykkönen (Tier 2)
