= FinnPa =

Home colours	Away colours

Finnairin Palloilijat, or FinnPa as the club is more commonly known as, was a Finnish association football club established in 1965. The club was based in Helsinki and it operated from 1965 to 1998. FinnPa was founded by staff of the Finnish national airline Aero as "Aeron Pallo". When the company changed its name to Finnair, the club was also renamed Finnairin Palloilijat (Ball players of Finnair).

In 1976 the club's men's team was promoted to the Second Division, the third highest level of football in Finland. It remained at the three highest levels for the rest of the club's existence with the absolute peak being the club's promotion to the Premier Division in 1993. In 1997 the club finished at third place in the league table.

1998 became the club's last season of existence when FinnPa was relegated to the First Division after losing to Tampereen Pallo-Veikot in the relegation playoffs. Finnair wasn't willing to support the club financially anymore, so it folded.

FinnPa played a total of six seasons at the highest level of football in Finland.

== Season to season ==
Season to season

Season	Level	Division	Section	Administration	Position	Movements
1966	Tier 5	Piirinsarja (District League)		Helsinki District (SPL Helsinki)		Aeron Pallo Promoted
1967	Tier 4	Aluesarja (Fourth Division)	Group 2 Helsinki	Finnish FA (Suomen Pallolitto)	1st	Aeron Pallo Promoted
1968	Tier 3	Maakuntasarja (Third Division)	Group 1 Helsinki & Uusimaa	Finnish FA (Suomen Pallolitto)	6th	
1969	Tier 3	Maakuntasarja (Third Division)	Group 1 Helsinki & Uusimaa	Finnish FA (Suomen Pallolitto)	5th	
1970	Tier 3	III Divisioona (Third Division)	Group 1 Helsinki & Uusimaa	Finnish FA (Suomen Pallolitto)	7th	
1971	Tier 3	III Divisioona (Third Division)	Group 1 Helsinki & Uusimaa	Finnish FA (Suomen Pallolitto)	11th	Relegated
1972	Tier 4	IV Divisioona (Fourth Division)	Group 1 Helsinki & Uusimaa	Finnish FA (Suomen Pallolitto)	4th	
1973	Tier 5	IV Divisioona (Fourth Division)	Group 1 Helsinki & Uusimaa	Finnish FA (Suomen Pallolitto)	3rd	
1974	Tier 5	IV Divisioona (Fourth Division)	Group 3 Helsinki & Uusimaa	Finnish FA (Suomen Pallolitto)	1st	Promoted
1975	Tier 4	III Divisioona (Third Division)	Group 2 Helsinki & Uusimaa	Finnish FA (Suomen Pallolitto)	1st	Promoted
1976	Tier 3	II Divisioona (Second Division)	East Group	Finnish FA (Suomen Pallolitto)	1st	Promoted
1977	Tier 2	I Divisioona (First Division)		Finnish FA (Suomen Palloliitto)	10th	Relegated
1978	Tier 3	II Divisioona (Second Division)	East Group	Finnish FA (Suomen Pallolitto)	4th	
1979	Tier 3	II Divisioona (Second Division)	East Group	Finnish FA (Suomen Pallolitto)	7th	
1980	Tier 3	II Divisioona (Second Division)	West Group	Finnish FA (Suomen Pallolitto)	1st	Promotion Playoffs - Promoted
1981	Tier 2	I Divisioona (First Division)		Finnish FA (Suomen Palloliitto)	11th	Relegation Group 4th
1982	Tier 2	I Divisioona (First Division)		Finnish FA (Suomen Palloliitto)	4th	Promotion Group 8th
1983	Tier 2	I Divisioona (First Division)		Finnish FA (Suomen Palloliitto)	9th	Relegation Group 3rd
1984	Tier 2	I Divisioona (First Division)		Finnish FA (Suomen Palloliitto)	8th	
1985	Tier 2	I Divisioona (First Division)		Finnish FA (Suomen Palloliitto)	7th	
1986	Tier 2	I Divisioona (First Division)		Finnish FA (Suomen Palloliitto)	7th	
1987	Tier 2	I Divisioona (First Division)		Finnish FA (Suomen Palloliitto)	7th	
1988	Tier 2	I Divisioona (First Division)		Finnish FA (Suomen Palloliitto)	11th	Relegated
1989	Tier 3	II Divisioona (Second Division)	East Group	Finnish FA (Suomen Pallolitto)	4th	
1990	Tier 3	II Divisioona (Second Division)	East Group	Finnish FA (Suomen Pallolitto)	1st	Promoted
1991	Tier 2	I Divisioona (First Division)		Finnish FA (Suomen Palloliitto)	2nd	Promotion Playoff
1992	Tier 2	I Divisioona (First Division)		Finnish FA (Suomen Palloliitto)	2nd	Promotion Playoff - Promoted
1993	Tier 1	Veikkausliiga (Premier League)		Finnish FA (Suomen Palloliitto)	4th	Championship Group 5th
1994	Tier 1	Veikkausliiga (Premier League)		Finnish FA (Suomen Palloliitto)	10th	
1995	Tier 1	Veikkausliiga (Premier League)		Finnish FA (Suomen Palloliitto)	8th	
1996	Tier 1	Veikkausliiga (Premier League)		Finnish FA (Suomen Palloliitto)	4th	Championship Group 4th
1997	Tier 1	Veikkausliiga (Premier League)		Finnish FA (Suomen Palloliitto)	3rd	
1998	Tier 1	Veikkausliiga (Premier League)		Finnish FA (Suomen Palloliitto)	9th	Relegation Playoff - Relegated,

- 6 seasons in Veikkausliiga
- 11 seasons in Ykkönen
- 10 seasons in Kakkonen
- 3 season in Kolmonen
- 3 season in Nelonen
