= Porin Palloilijat =

Finnish football club

- Founded: 1925
- Ground: Porin Stadion, Pori; Finland
- Capacity: 12,000
- Chairman: Eero Laurila
- Head Coach: Pertti Lundell
- Coach: Risto Puustinen
- League: Vitonen
| Home colours | Away colours |

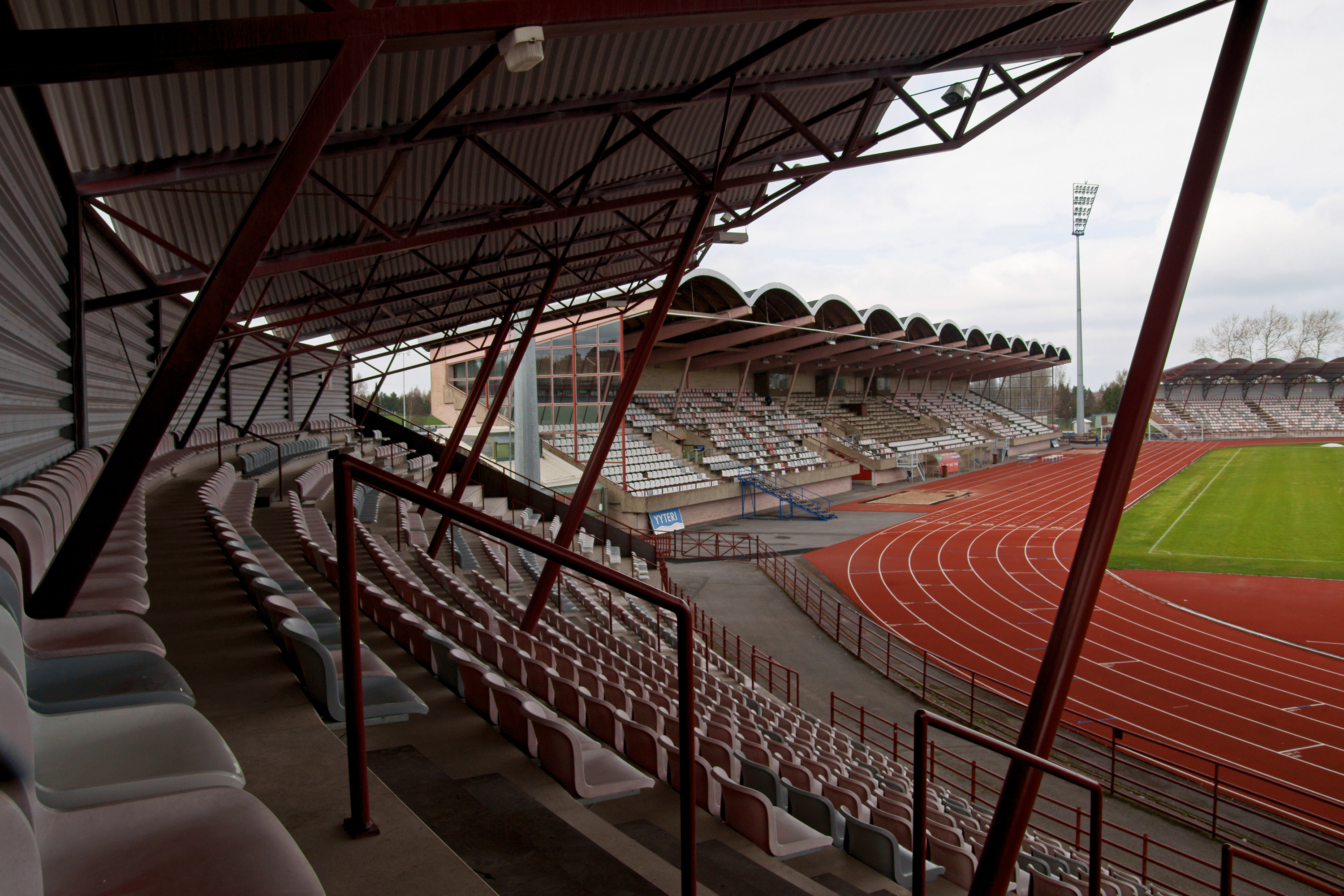
Porin Stadion

Porin Palloilijat or formerly FC PoPa is a Finnish football club, based in the city of Pori in Finland. The club currently plays in the Vitonen, the seventh highest level of Finnish football. The club was established in 1925 but did not operate between 1960 and 1981.

== History ==
Porin Palloilijat is the oldest team sports club in Pori, being over 85 years old. Bror Weckström had the original idea of forming a new team in Pori and on 16 April 1925 the first meeting of PoPa was held in the café at Pori Theatre.

It was decided to form a team called Porin Palloilijat and to make football and bandy their main focus. The first Committee members were Erkki Laitinen, J. Kari, Bror Weckström, O. Huhtanen, A. Forsberg and H. Lingvist. In May 1925 the constitution and rules for the club were prepared and the team was registered on 13 May 1925. They also included ice-hockey, women's basketball and ice-skating within the club's featured programme. The first chairman was Erkki Laitinen and he was later followed by Veikko Laitinen.

PoPa played their first games at Liisantori and then later at Tiilimäki before moving in 1929 to the football and ice-hockey field at Juhannuslehto. The club later moved to the Herralahti football ground.

PoPa had a rich early history playing 10 seasons in the Suomisarja (Finland League) which at that time was the second tier of Finnish football in 1937–39 and 1945–51.

They have had three periods covering seven seasons in the Kakkonen (Second Division), the third tier of Finnish football in 1989, 2002–03 and 2005–08.

FC PoPa Oy took over the responsibility for the sport and financial operation of the principal team in 2007. In season 2007 PoPa played in the Kakkonen (Second Division) in the Western Group, reaching second place just one point short of promotion to the Ykkönen (First Division). In 2008 the team went one better winning the Western Group of Second Division in a crushing manner and were promoted to the Ykkönen for 2009.

The club maintained their rapid progress in 2009 by finishing fourth in the Ykkönen and are well on target of bringing Veikkausliiga football back to Pori. The key people behind the initiative are Antti Sumiala (sport and managing director), Rami Nieminen (manager / marketing executive), Pertti Lundell (coach) and Risto Puustinen (coach).

FThe strategy of FC PoPa is to play attacking and entertaining football, to develop young, talented players for the use of FC PoPa and to sell the most talented players to the foreign professional clubs.

FC PoPa changed their name back to Porin Palloilijat in 2012.

== Season to season ==
Season to season of PoPa

| Season | Level | Division | Section | Administration | Position | Movements |
|---|---|---|---|---|---|---|
| 1935 | Tier 2 | B-Sarja (Second Division) | West Group | Finnish FA (Suomen Pallolitto) | 7th | Relegated |
| 1936 | Tier 3 | Maakuntasarja (Regional League) | West | Finnish FA (Suomen Pallolitto) | | Promoted |
| 1937 | Tier 2 | Itä-Länsi-Sarja (East-West Series) | West League | Finnish FA (Suomen Pallolitto) | 7th | |
| 1938 | Tier 2 | Itä-Länsi-Sarja (East-West Series) | West League Northern Group | Finnish FA (Suomen Pallolitto) | 7th | |
| 1939 | Tier 2 | Itä-Länsi-Sarja (East-West Series) | West League Group 3 | Finnish FA (Suomen Pallolitto) | 4th | |
| 1940-41 | Tier 3 | C-Sarja (Third Division) | Group 2 | Finnish FA (Suomen Pallolitto) | 1st | Promotion Playoff |
| 1943-44 | Tier 3 | Maakuntasarja (Regional League) | Cup-format | Finnish FA (Suomen Pallolitto) | 2nd round | Competition cancelled due to WWII |
| 1945 | Tier 2 | Suomisarja (Finland Series) | Group B | Finnish FA (Suomen Pallolitto) | 2nd | |
| 1945-46 | Tier 2 | Suomisarja (Finland Series) | | Finnish FA (Suomen Pallolitto) | 4th | |
| 1946-47 | Tier 2 | Suomisarja (Finland Series) | North Group | Finnish FA (Suomen Pallolitto) | 6th | |
| 1947-48 | Tier 2 | Suomisarja (Finland Series) | North Group | Finnish FA (Suomen Pallolitto) | 1st | Promotion Group 4th |
| 1948 | Tier 2 | Suomisarja (Finland Series) | North Group | Finnish FA (Suomen Pallolitto) | 7th | |
| 1949 | Tier 2 | Suomisarja (Finland Series) | West Group | Finnish FA (Suomen Pallolitto) | 6th | |
| 1950 | Tier 2 | Suomisarja (Finland Series) | West Group | Finnish FA (Suomen Pallolitto) | 6th | |
| 1951 | Tier 2 | Suomisarja (Finland Series) | West Group | Finnish FA (Suomen Pallolitto) | 10th | Relegated |
| 1952 | Tier 3 | Maakuntasarja (Regional League) | West Group B | Finnish FA (Suomen Pallolitto) | 1st | Promotion Playoff |
| 1953 | Tier 3 | Maakuntasarja (Regional League) | West Group B | Finnish FA (Suomen Pallolitto) | 2nd | |
| 1954 | Tier 3 | Maakuntasarja (Regional League) | West Group I | Finnish FA (Suomen Pallolitto) | 1st | Promotion Playoff |
| 1955 | Tier 3 | Maakuntasarja (Regional League) | North Group II | Finnish FA (Suomen Pallolitto) | 3rd | |
| 1956 | Tier 3 | Maakuntasarja (Regional League) | West Group I | Finnish FA (Suomen Pallolitto) | 3rd | |
| 1957 | Tier 3 | Maakuntasarja (Regional League) | West Group II | Finnish FA (Suomen Pallolitto) | 7th | |
| 1958 | Tier 3 | Maakuntasarja (Regional League) | Group 4 | Finnish FA (Suomen Pallolitto) | 5th | |
| 1959 | Tier 3 | Maakuntasarja (Regional League) | Group 5 | Finnish FA (Suomen Pallolitto) | 1st | Promoted |
| 1960 | | | | | | Merged with Porin Kärpät to form Porin Karhut |
| 1982 | Tier 4 | 3. Divisioona (Third Division) | Group 4 | Finnish FA (Suomen Pallolitto) | 6th | |
| 1983 | Tier 4 | 3. Divisioona (Third Division) | Group 4 | Finnish FA (Suomen Pallolitto) | 11th | Relegated |
| 1984 | Tier 5 | 4. Divisioona (Fourth Division) | Group 6 | Finnish FA (Suomen Pallolitto) | 1st | Promotion Playoff |
| 1985 | Tier 5 | 4. Divisioona (Fourth Division) | Group 6 | Finnish FA (Suomen Pallolitto) | 1st | Promoted |
| 1986 | Tier 4 | 3. Divisioona (Third Division) | Group 4 | Finnish FA (Suomen Pallolitto) | 4th | |
| 1987 | Tier 4 | 3. Divisioona (Third Division) | Group 4 | Finnish FA (Suomen Pallolitto) | 5th | |
| 1988 | Tier 4 | 3. Divisioona (Third Division) | Group 4 | Finnish FA (Suomen Pallolitto) | 1st | Promoted |
| 1989 | Tier 3 | 2. Divisioona (Second Division) | West Group | Finnish FA (Suomen Pallolitto) | 10th | Relegation Playoff - Relegated |
| 1990 | Tier 4 | 3. Divisioona (Third Division) | Group 4 | Finnish FA (Suomen Pallolitto) | 10th | Relegated |
| 1991 | Tier 5 | 4. Divisioona (Fourth Division) | | Satakunta District (SPL Satakunta) | | Promoted |
| 1992 | Tier 4 | 3. Divisioona (Third Division) | Group 4 | Finnish FA (Suomen Pallolitto) | 5th | |
| 1993 | Tier 4 | Kolmonen (Third Division) | Group 4 | Finnish FA (Suomen Pallolitto) | 9th | |
| 1994 | Tier 4 | Kolmonen (Third Division) | Group 4 | Finnish FA (Suomen Pallolitto) | 9th | |
| 1995 | Tier 4 | Kolmonen (Third Division) | Group 4 | Satakunta District (SPL Satakunta) | 4th | |
| 1996 | Tier 4 | Kolmonen (Third Division) | Group 4 | Satakunta District (SPL Satakunta) | 6th | |
| 1997 | Tier 4 | Kolmonen (Third Division) | Group 4 | Satakunta District (SPL Satakunta) | 8th | |
| 1998 | Tier 4 | Kolmonen (Third Division) | Group 4 | Satakunta District (SPL Satakunta) | 5th | |
| 1999 | Tier 4 | Kolmonen (Third Division) | Group 4 | Satakunta District (SPL Satakunta) | 4th | |
| 2000 | Tier 4 | Kolmonen (Third Division) | | Satakunta District (SPL Satakunta) | 3rd | |
| 2001 | Tier 4 | Kolmonen (Third Division) | | Satakunta District (SPL Satakunta) | 1st | Promoted |
| 2002 | Tier 3 | Kakkonen (Second Division) | West Group | Finnish FA (Suomen Pallolitto) | 5th | |
| 2003 | Tier 3 | Kakkonen (Second Division) | West Group | Finnish FA (Suomen Pallolitto) | 12th | Relegated |
| 2004 | Tier 4 | Kolmonen (Third Division) | | Satakunta District (SPL Satakunta) | 1st | Promoted |
| 2005 | Tier 3 | Kakkonen (Second Division) | West Group | Finnish FA (Suomen Pallolitto) | 2nd | |
| 2006 | Tier 3 | Kakkonen (Second Division) | Group B | Finnish FA (Suomen Pallolitto) | 3rd | |
| 2007 | Tier 3 | Kakkonen (Second Division) | Group B | Finnish FA (Suomen Pallolitto) | 2nd | |
| 2008 | Tier 3 | Kakkonen (Second Division) | Group B | Finnish FA (Suomen Pallolitto) | 1st | Promoted |
| 2009 | Tier 2 | Ykkönen (First Division) | | Finnish FA (Suomen Pallolitto) | 4th | |
| 2010 | Tier 2 | Ykkönen (First Division) | | Finnish FA (Suomen Pallolitto) | 3rd | |
| 2011 | Tier 2 | Ykkönen (First Division) | | Finnish FA (Suomen Pallolitto) | 11th | Relegated - Bankruptcy |
| 2012 | Tier 6 | Vitonen (Fifth Division) | | Satakunta District (SPL Satakunta) | 10th | |
| 2013 | Tier 7 | Kutonen (Sixth Division) | | Satakunta District (SPL Satakunta) | 6th | Preliminary qualifications for 2013 Vitonen 7th |
| 2014 | Tier 7 | Kutonen (Sixth Division) | | Satakunta District (SPL Satakunta) | 2nd | Promoted |
| 2015 | Tier 6 | Vitonen (Fifth Division) | | Satakunta District (SPL Satakunta) | 2nd | Promoted |
| 2016 | Tier 5 | Nelonen (Fourth Division) | | Satakunta District (SPL Satakunta) | 7th | |
| 2017 | Tier 5 | Nelonen (Fourth Division) | Group 1 | Western District (SPL Länsi-Suomi) | 6th | |
| 2018 | Tier 5 | Nelonen (Fourth Division) | Group 2 | Western District (SPL Länsi-Suomi) | 10th | Relegated |
| 2019 | Tier 6 | Vitonen (Fifth Division) | Group 3 | Western District (SPL Länsi-Suomi) | 6th | |
| 2020 | Tier 6 | Vitonen (Fifth Division) | Group A3 | Western District (SPL Läntinen) | 6th | |
| 2021 | Tier 6 | Vitonen (Fifth Division) | Group A3 | Western District (SPL Läntinen) | 6th | |
| 2022 | Tier 6 | Vitonen (Fifth Division) | Group A3 | Western District (SPL Läntinen) | 4th | |
| 2023 | Tier 6 | Vitonen (Fifth Division) | Group A3 | Western District (SPL Läntinen) | 6th | |
| 2024 | Tier 7 | Vitonen (Fifth Division) | Group A3 | Western District (SPL Läntinen) | 8th | Relegated |
| 2025 | Tier 8 | Kutonen (Sixth Division) | Group A4 | Western District (SPL Läntinen) | | |

- 15 seasons in 2nd Tier
- 18 seasons in 3rd Tier
- 17 seasons in 4th Tier
- 6 seasons in 5th Tier
- 7 seasons in 6th Tier
- 3 seasons in 7th Tier
- 1 season in 8th Tier

== Club structure ==
PoPa currently has one men's team. There is also a futsal team that plays in the Second Division. The club runs one junior football team.

== 2024 season ==
PoPa are competing in the Vitonen administered by the Football Association of Finland (Suomen Palloliitto). This is the seventh tier of the Finnish football system.

== References and sources ==
- (in Finnish) Official Website
- (in Finnish) General Website
- (in Finnish) Finnish Wikipedia
- (in Finnish) Suomen Cup
- (in Finnish) Porin Palloilijat Facebook
- (in English) Unofficial Supporter Site
