= Vidjeskog =

Vidjeskog is a surname. Notable people with the surname include:

- Adam Vidjeskog (born 1998), Finnish footballer
- Axel Vidjeskog (born 2001), Finnish footballer
- Isak Vidjeskog (born 2004), Finnish footballer
