= Emil Öhberg =

Finnish footballer (born 1993)

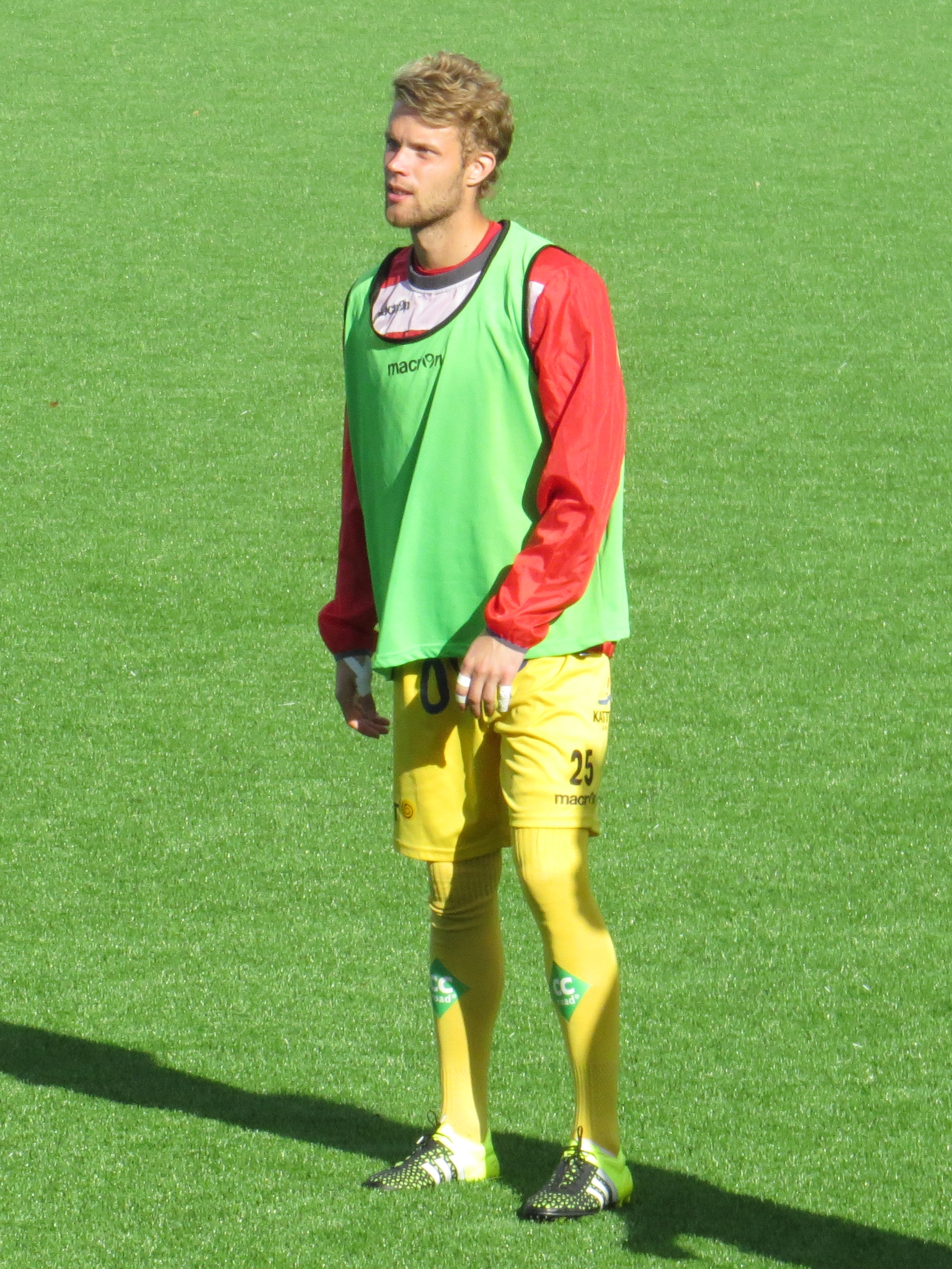
- Öhberg with FF Jaro in 2015

Personal information
- Date of birth: 20 June 1993 (age 33)
- Place of birth: Vaasa, Finland
- Height: 1.82 m (6 ft 0 in)
- Position: Goalkeeper

Team information
- Current team: Jaro (goalkeeping coach)
- Number: 25

Youth career
- Jaro
- TPS

Senior career*
Years	Team	Apps	(Gls)
2011	Jaro	0	(0)
2011	JBK	8	(0)
2012	TPS	0	(0)
2012	→ ÅIFK (loan)	6	(0)
2013–2020	Jaro	113	(0)
2014–2016	JBK	12	(0)
2021	JBK	7	(0)
2022–2026	Jaro	19	(0)
2022	JBK	2	(0)

Managerial career
- 2027–: FF Jaro (gk coach)
- * Club domestic league appearances and goals as of 28 July 2025

Emil Öhberg (born 20 June 1993) is a Finnish former footballer who played as a goalkeeper. He is currently goalkeeping coach of Veikkausliiga club Jaro.

== Honours ==
Jaro

- Ykkösliiga runner-up: 2024
