= Axel Vidjeskog =

Finnish footballer

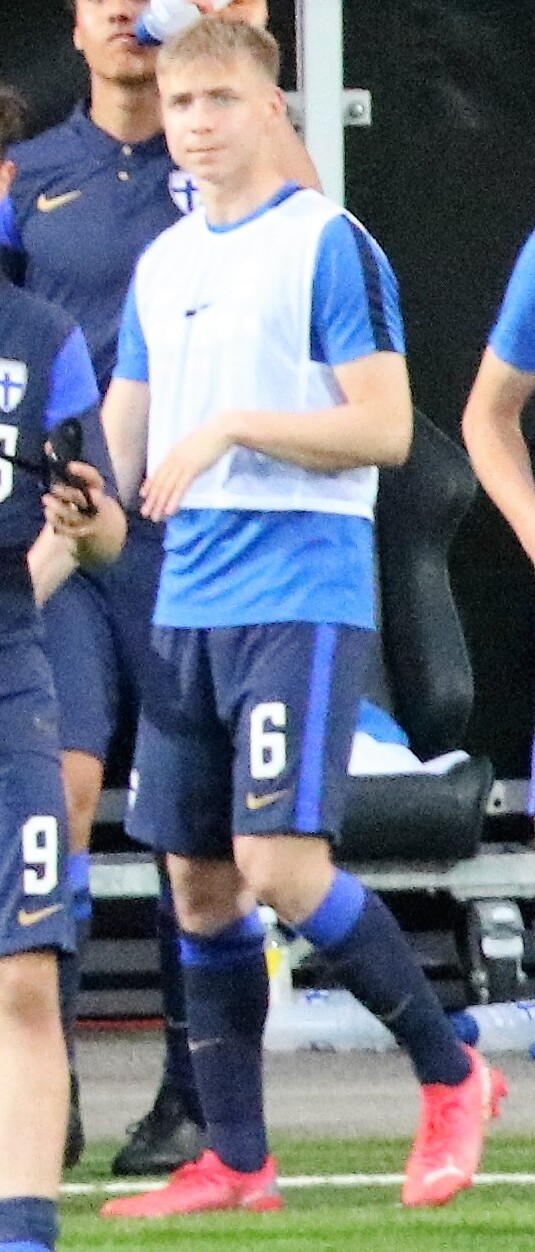
- Vidjeskog with Finland U21 in 2022

Personal information
- Full name: Axel Johannes Vidjeskog
- Date of birth: 14 April 2001 (age 25)
- Place of birth: Kronoby, Finland
- Height: 1.78 m (5 ft 10 in)
- Position: Midfielder

Team information
- Current team: Varbergs BoIS
- Number: 10

Senior career*
Years	Team	Apps	(Gls)
2017–2020	JBK	11	(1)
2017–2020	Jaro	35	(6)
2021	KuFu-98	6	(6)
2021–2024	KuPS	73	(10)
2022	→ Ilves (loan)	10	(1)
2025	Trelleborg	26	(3)
2026–	Varbergs BoIS	3	(0)

International career^{‡}
2017	Finland U16	4	(0)
2017	Finland U17	3	(0)
2019	Finland U18	3	(0)
2022	Finland U21	3	(0)
- * Club domestic league appearances and goals as of 21 July 2026 ‡ National team caps and goals as of 10 June 2022

Axel Johannes Vidjeskog (born 14 April 2001) is a Finnish professional footballer who plays as a midfielder for Varbergs BoIS in Superettan.

== Club career ==
Vidjeskog began to play football in the youth program of FF Jaro. He started his senior career in 2017, playing for Jaro first team in the second-tier Ykkönen, and for the reserve team Jakobstads BK in the third-tier Kakkonen.

For the 2021 season, Vidjeskog joined a Veikkausliiga club Kuopion Palloseura (KuPS). At the start of the 2022 season, he was loaned out to fellow Veikkausliiga side Ilves. He returned to KuPS in July, after his loan deal expired. Vidjeskog and KuPS won two consecutive Finnish Cups in 2021 and 2022. On 13 November 2023, he extended his contract with KuPS until the end of 2024. Widjeskog and KuPS won the 2024 Finnish Cup and the Finnish Championship title, completing the club's first-ever double.

On 12 February 2025, he signed with Trelleborg. He scored his first goal for Trelleborg on 28 February, the winning goal in a 1–0 win against Degerfors in Svenska Cupen.

On 29 January 2026, he signed with Varbergs BoIS

== Personal life ==
Vidjeskog is a Swedish-speaking Finn. Two of his brothers are also professional footballers. The younger brother Isak Vidjeskog plays for Varbergs BoIS, and the older Adam Vidjeskog plays for Jaro. Their father Niklas is a head coach of Jaro.

== Career statistics ==
As of 21 July 2026

Appearances and goals by club, season and competition
Club	Season	Division	League		National cup (Note: Includes Suomen Cup and Svenska Cupen)		League cup		Europe		Total	
Club	Season	Division	Apps	Goals	Apps	Goals	Apps	Goals	Apps	Goals	Apps	Goals
Jakobstads BK	2017	Kakkonen	2	0	–		–		–		2	0
Jakobstads BK	2018	Kakkonen	4	1	–		–		–		4	1
Jakobstads BK	2019	Kakkonen	2	0	–		–		–		2	0
Jakobstads BK	2020	Kakkonen	3	0	–		–		–		3	0
Jakobstads BK	Total		11	1	0	0	0	0	0	0	11	1
Jaro	2017	Ykkönen	3	0	–		–		–		3	0
Jaro	2018	Ykkönen	3	0	1	0	–		–		4	0
Jaro	2019	Ykkönen	20	4	2	0	–		–		22	4
Jaro	2020	Ykkönen	9	2	5	0	–		–		14	2
Jaro	Total		35	7	8	0	0	0	0	0	43	7
KuFu-98	2021	Kakkonen	6	6	–		–		–		6	6
KuPS	2021	Veikkausliiga	16	1	4	0	–		4 (Note: Includes UEFA Conference League)	0	24	1
KuPS	2022	Veikkausliiga	9	1	0	0	3	0	1	0	13	1
KuPS	2023	Veikkausliiga	22	4	2	0	5	0	2	1	31	5
KuPS	2024	Veikkausliiga	26	4	4	1	7	4	4	1	41	10
KuPS	Total		73	10	10	1	15	4	11	3	109	17
Ilves (loan)	2022	Veikkausliiga	10	1	–		–		–		10	1
Trelleborg	2025	Superettan	26	3	3	1	–		–		29	4
Varbergs BoIS	2026	Superettan	3	0	3	0	–		–		6	0
Career total			164	28	24	2	15	4	11	3	214	36

== Honours ==
KuPS

- Veikkausliiga: 2024
- Veikkausliiga runner-up: 2021, 2022, 2023
- Finnish Cup: 2021, 2022, 2024
- Finnish League Cup runner-up: 2024
