= Aron Bjonbäck =

Finnish footballer (born 2002)

Personal information
- Date of birth: 18 April 2002 (age 24)
- Place of birth: Finland
- Height: 1.78 m (5 ft 10 in)
- Position: Right back

Team information
- Current team: Jaro
- Number: 5

Youth career
- Jaro

Senior career*
Years	Team	Apps	(Gls)
2020–2023	JBK	31	(1)
2020–	Jaro	134	(2)
- * Club domestic league appearances and goals as of 13 November 2026

Aron Bjonbäck (born 18 April 2002) is a Finnish professional footballer who plays for Veikkausliiga club Jaro as a right back.
