= Isak Vidjeskog =

Finnish footballer (born 2004)

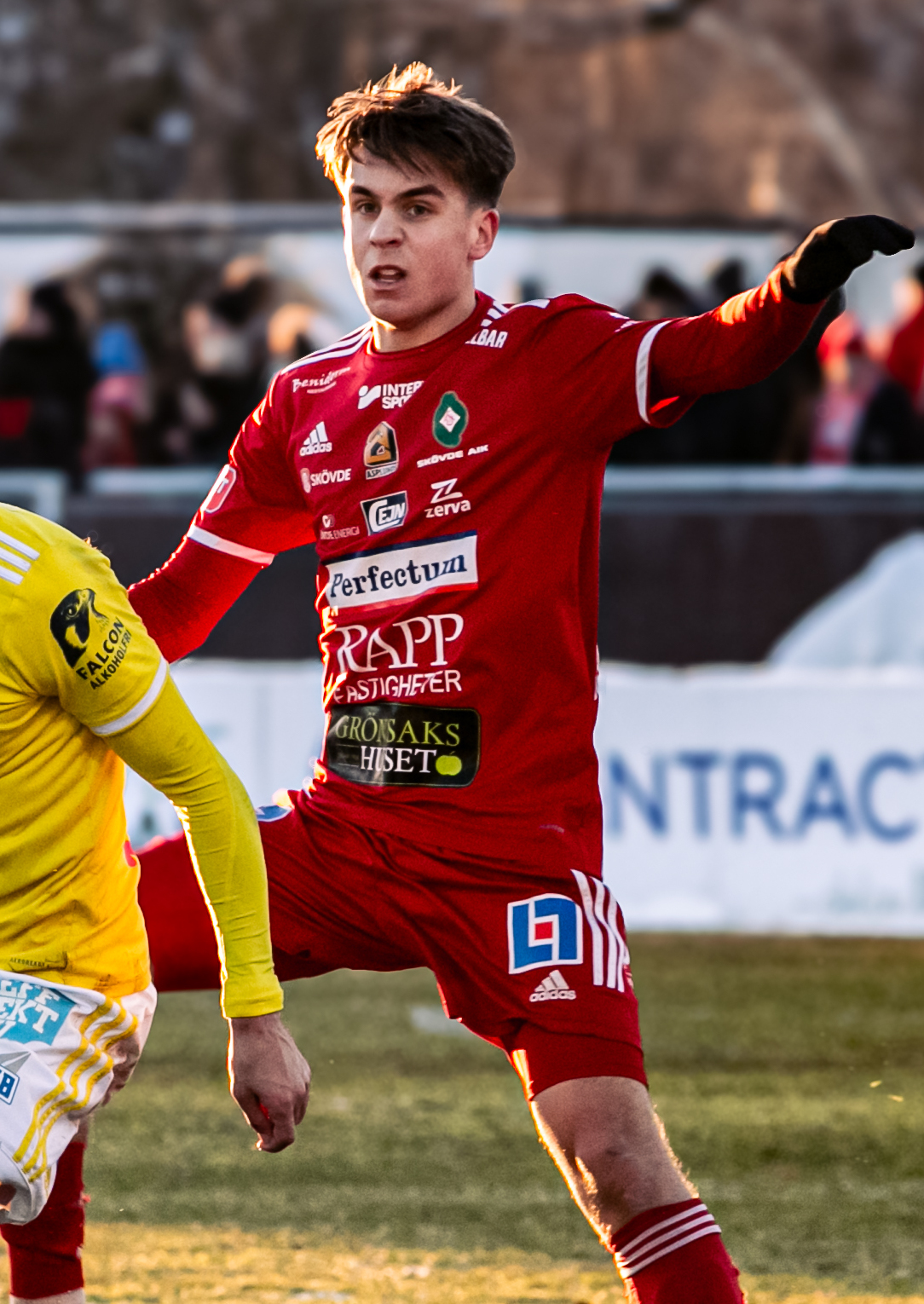
- Vidjeskog with Skövde AIK in 2023

Personal information
- Date of birth: 28 March 2004 (age 22)
- Place of birth: Finland
- Position: Midfielder

Team information
- Current team: Varbergs BoIS
- Number: 21

Youth career
- –2016: TUS
- 2017–2020: Jaro
- 2021–2023: Kalmar FF

Senior career*
Years	Team	Apps	(Gls)
2020	JBK	5	(1)
2021–2023	Kalmar	1	(0)
2023	Skövde AIK	24	(6)
2024–	Varbergs BoIS	58	(12)

International career^{‡}
2019	Finland U16	5	(1)
2021–2022	Finland U18	5	(0)
2022	Finland U19	5	(1)
- * Club domestic league appearances and goals as of 11 November 2026 ‡ National team caps and goals as of 14 December 2021

Isak Vidjeskog (born 28 March 2004) is a Finnish professional footballer who plays as a midfielder for Varbergs BoIS.

== Club career ==
Vidjeskog played in the youth sectors of Terjärv Ungdoms Sportklubb and Jaro. He made his senior debut with Jakobstads BK in 2020, before moving to Sweden and signing with Allsvenskan club Kalmar FF. He was first assigned to the club's U19 team, but made his Allsvenskan debut with the first team in 2021.

In 2023, he first joined Skövde AIK on loan, and in the summer on permanent transfer.

Vidjeskog missed most of the 2024 season with Varbergs BoIS due to injury.

== Personal life ==
His two older brothers are both also professional footballers, Axel Vidjeskog plays for KuPS and Adam Vidjeskog plays for FF Jaro. Their father Niklas is a head coach of Jaro.

== Career statistics ==
As of 21 July 2026

Appearances and goals by club, season and competition
Club	Season	League			National cup (Note: Includes Svenska Cupen)		Continental		Other		Total	
Club	Season	Division	Apps	Goals	Apps	Goals	Apps	Goals	Apps	Goals	Apps	Goals
Jakobstads BK	2020	Kakkonen	5	1	–		–		–		5	1
Kalmar	2021	Allsvenskan	1	0	1	0	–		–		2	0
Kalmar	2022	Allsvenskan	0	0	1	0	–		–		1	0
Kalmar	Total		1	0	2	0	0	0	0	0	3	0
Skövde AIK	2023	Superettan	24	6	0	0	–		–		7	2
Varbergs BoIS	2024	Superettan	5	0	3	0	–		–		8	0
Varbergs BoIS	2025	Superettan	27	4	1	0	–		–		28	4
Varbergs BoIS	2026	Superettan	12	3	1	0	–		–		13	3
Varbergs BoIS	Total		44	7	5	0	–	–	–	–	49	7
Career total			74	15	7	0	0	0	0	0	81	14
