= Project Liv Arena =

Football stadium in Jakobstad, Finland

- Interactive map of Project Liv Arena
- Location: Jakobstad, Finland
- Coordinates: 63.672°N 22.694°E
- Owner: Jeppis Stadion Ab
- Capacity: 3,616
- Surface: Artificial turf

Construction
- Opened: 2025
- General contractor: Byggnads Ab Nynäs Rakennus Oy

Tenant
- FF Jaro

The Pietarsaari Football Stadium or Project Liv Arena is an association football stadium in Jakobstad, Finland. It is the home venue of Veikkausliiga club FF Jaro.

Opened in 2025, the stadium has a seating capacity of 3,616 for football matches and an artificial turf surface. It is owned by Jeppis Stadion Ab, a consortium of the city's clubs including FC United, FF Jaro, Jakobstads BK, and IFK Jakobstad.

== History ==
The need for a football arena in Jakobstad was discussed since at least the 1990s. The first meeting to discuss the construction of a new stadium, then called the Jeppis Arena, was held on On 18 June 2019, following several failed project attempts over the decades. After several setbacks, construction of the stadium began on 24 June 2024. The stadium was official opened with an FC United match against GBK on 24 July 2025 with the home team winning 9–0. The following day, the first men's match was held at the stadium with FF Jaro facing Vaasan Palloseura in front of a sold out crowd. Adam Vidjeskog's scored FF Jaro's first goal in the arena.

== Naming rights ==
From its conception, the arena's naming rights have been held by Project Liv, a Finnish organization supporting families with children with illness and disabilities.
