= Niklas Vidjeskog =

Finnish football manager and a former player (born 1969)

Personal information
- Date of birth: 24 February 1969 (age 57)
- Place of birth: Terjärv, Finland
- Height: 1.78 m (5 ft 10 in)
- Position: Midfielder

Team information
- Current team: Umeå FC (manager)

Youth career
- Terjärv Ungdoms Sportklubb

Senior career*
Years	Team	Apps	(Gls)
1988–1989	TUS	42	(23)
1990–1992	KPV	55	(10)
1993–2000	Jaro	187	(28)
2001	Östersund	18	(12)
2002–2005	TUS	71	(32)
2008–2009	TUS	11	(3)

Managerial career
- 2002–2006: TUS
- 2006: Jaro (assistant)
- 2006: Jaro (caretaker)
- 2007–2016: Jaro (technical coach)
- 2016: Jaro (caretaker)
- 2016: Jaro (assistant)
- 2017–2020: Jaro (youth)
- 2021: KPV (assistant)
- 2021: KPV
- 2024–2025: Jaro
- 2026–: Umeå FC
- * Club domestic league appearances and goals as of 2 April 2024

Niklas Vidjeskog (born 24 February 1969) is a Finnish football manager and a former player, who played as a midfielder. He is currently the manager of Swedish club Umeå FC.

== Playing career ==
As a player, Vidjeskog has made 149 total appearances in Veikkausliiga for Jaro and KPV, scoring 11 goals in total. He has also played for Swedish club Östersunds FK.

== Coaching career ==
Vidjeskog has coached in his former clubs TUS and FF Jaro. He also worked briefly as an assistant coach and interim head coach of Kokkolan Palloveikot (KPV) in 2021.

He was named the head coach of Jaro on 4 November 2023, starting in 2024. At the end of the 2024 Ykkösliiga season, his first full season as the Jaro head coach, he helped the club to finish as the runners-up, and eventually they were promoted to top-tier Veikkausliiga by defeating Lahti in the promotion play-offs.

== Personal life ==
His three oldest sons are all professional footballers: Adam is playing in Finland, for Jaro. Axel and Isak play in Sweden for Trelleborgs FF and Varbergs BoIS, respectively. His fourth and youngest son Ivar plays for the youth sector of Jaro. Vidjeskog has also worked as an elementary school teacher.

== Managerial statistics ==
As of 12 April 2026

Team	Nat	From	To	Record				
Team	Nat	From	To	G	W	D	L	Win %
Jaro	(Finland)	1 September 2006	31 December 2006	6	1	2	3	16.67
Jaro	(Finland)	10 June 2016	28 July 2016	7	1	3	3	14.29
KPV	(Finland)	26 July 2021	31 December 2021	15	10	3	2	66.67
Jaro	(Finland)	1 January 2024	31 January 2025	74	40	8	26	54.05
Umeå FC	(Sweden)	1 January 2026	present	1	1	0	0	100.00
Total				103	53	16	34	51.46

== Managerial honours ==
Jaro

- Ykkösliiga runner-up: 2024
