= Adam Vidjeskog =

Finnish footballer (born 1998)

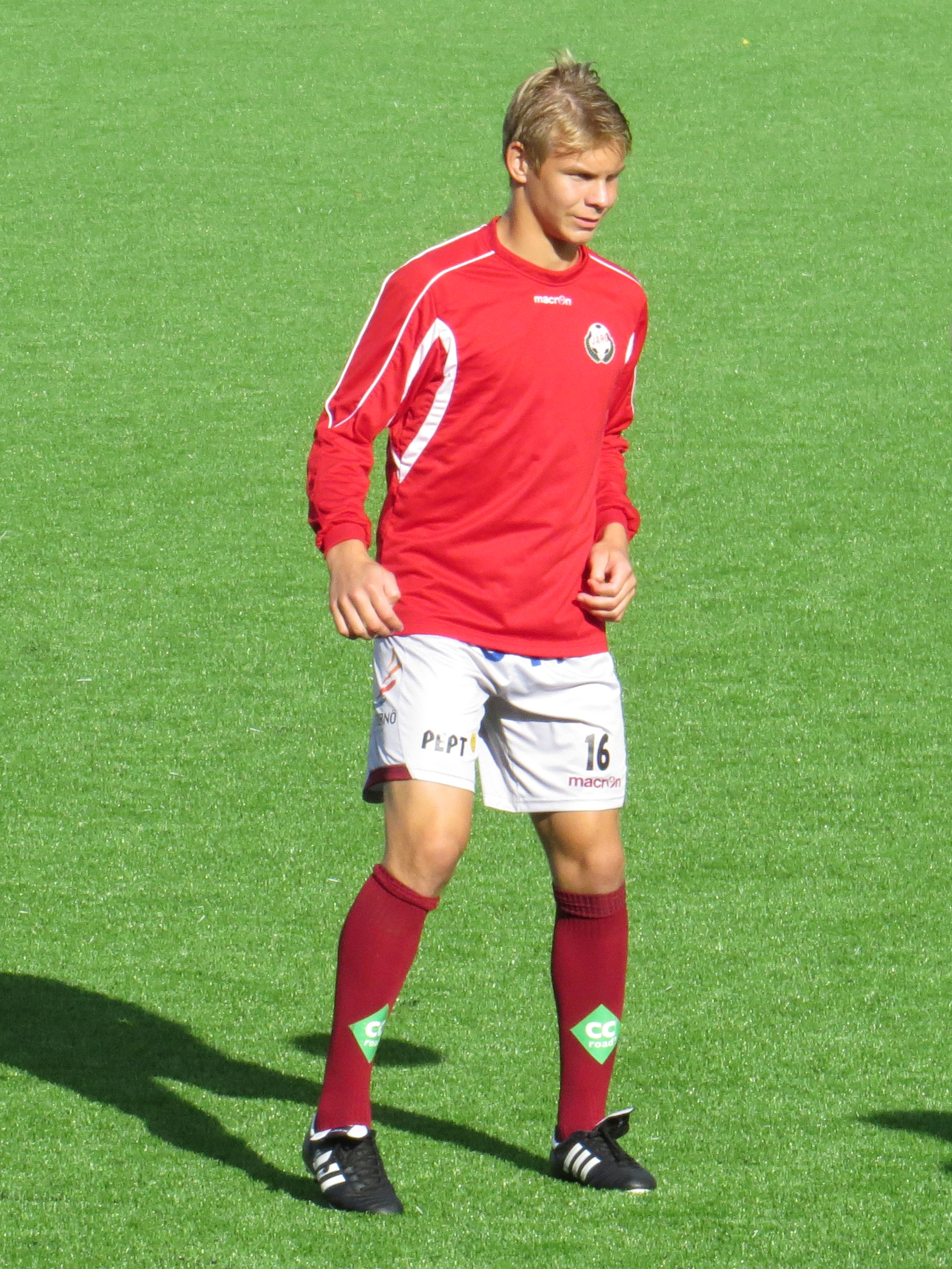
- Vidjeskog in 2015

Personal information
- Full name: Adam Alexander Vidjeskog
- Date of birth: 7 July 1998 (age 28)
- Place of birth: Kronoby, Finland
- Height: 1.79 m (5 ft 10 in)
- Position: Midfielder

Team information
- Current team: Jaro
- Number: 16

Youth career
- Terjärv Ungdoms Sportklubb
- –2014: Jaro
- 2016: → Gefle (loan)

Senior career*
Years	Team	Apps	(Gls)
2015–2017	Jaro	17	(0)
2015–2017	→ JBK	28	(0)
2018	PS Kemi	16	(0)
2019–2021	KPV	55	(4)
2022	Jaro	21	(1)
2023	Oskarshamns AIK	24	(0)
2024–	Jaro	71	(4)
- * Club domestic league appearances and goals as of 13 November 2026

Adam Alexander Vidjeskog (born 7 July 1998) is a Finnish professional footballer who plays as a midfielder for Veikkausliiga club Jaro.

== Career ==
Vidjeskog signed with Kokkolan PV on 15 January 2019. The deal he signed was for one-year, with an option to extended it with further one year.

In January 2024, Vidjeskog returned to his native Finland with Jaro for the 2024 season with the option for a further season, returning to the club he started his career with.

== Personal life ==
His two younger brothers are both also professional footballers. Axel Vidjeskog plays for KuPS and Isak Vidjeskog plays for Varbergs BoIS. Their father Niklas is a head coach of Jaro.

== Career statistics ==
As of 13 November 2026

Appearances and goals by club, season and competition
Club	Season	League			Cup (Note: Includes Suomen Cup and Svenska Cupen)		League cup (Note: Includes Finnish League Cup, Ykköscup and Ykkösliigacup)		Total	
Club	Season	Division	Apps	Goals	Apps	Goals	Apps	Goals	Apps	Goals
Jaro	2015	Veikkausliiga	1	0	0	0	3	0	4	0
Jaro	2016	Ykkönen	0	0	1	0	–		1	0
Jaro	2017	Ykkönen	16	0	4	1	–		20	1
Jaro	Total		17	0	5	1	3	0	25	1
Jakobstads BK	2015	Kakkonen	16	0	–		–		16	0
Jakobstads BK	2016	Kolmonen	4	0	–		–		4	0
Jakobstads BK	2017	Kakkonen	8	0	–		–		8	0
Jakobstads BK	Total		28	0	0	0	0	0	28	0
PS Kemi	2018	Veikkausliiga	16	0	3	0	–		19	0
KPV Akatemia	2019	Kolmonen	2	0	–		–		2	0
KPV	2019	Veikkausliiga	14	2	6	0	–		20	2
KPV	2020	Ykkönen	19	1	6	0	–		25	1
KPV	2021	Ykkönen	22	1	2	0	–		24	1
KPV	Total		55	4	14	0	0	0	69	4
Jaro	2022	Ykkönen	23	1	2	0	5	0	30	1
Jakobstads BK	2022	Kakkonen	1	0	–		–		1	0
Oskarshamns AIK	2023	Ettan	24	0	4	0	–		28	0
Jaro	2024	Ykkösliiga	25	3	0	0	6	3	31	6
Jaro	2025	Veikkausliiga	25	1	5	1	5	0	35	2
Jaro	2026	Veikkausliiga	25	0	3	0	4	0	32	0
Jaro	Total		75	4	8	1	15	3	98	8
Career total			241	9	36	2	21	3	298	14

== Honours ==
Jaro

- Ykkösliiga runner-up: 2024
