= FF Jaro =

Finnish football club

Jaro
- Full name: Fotbollsföreningen Jaro Jalkapalloseura
- Founded: 1965
- Ground: Project Liv Arena, Jakobstad
- Capacity: 3,616
- Chairman: Tommy Löfs
- Manager: Jens Karlsson
- League: Veikkausliiga
- 2026: Veikkausliiga, 11th of 12
Home colours	Away colours

Fotbollsföreningen Jaro (Jakobstads Rostfria), commonly known simply as Jaro, is a Finnish professional football club based in the bilingual town of Jakobstad. The club currently plays in Veikkausliiga, the top tier in Finland.

== History ==
Jaro was founded on December 18, 1965 by football enthusiasts working at Oy Jakobstads Rostfria Ab, which became the club’s first sponsor. Jaro rose through the Finnish football divisions, earning promotion to Finland’s top tier for the first time in 1988 by beating MyPa in a playoff game for direct promotion (3–2 on penalties). The club was relegated after one season but returned in 1991 and remained in Veikkausliiga until 1998. Jaro finished 5th in 1995 and played in the Intertoto Cup in 1996. Jaro also reached the Finnish Cup final in 1999 but lost to FC Jokerit.

The 2000s saw ups and downs, including financial difficulties in 2008 that were resolved through restructuring. Jaro remained in the Veikkausliiga from 2002 until 2015, when they were relegated to Ykkönen. In recent years, the club has continued to fight for promotion. In 2024, Jaro successfully returned to Veikkausliiga. In all, Jaro has played 23 seasons in the top-tier.

== Stadium ==
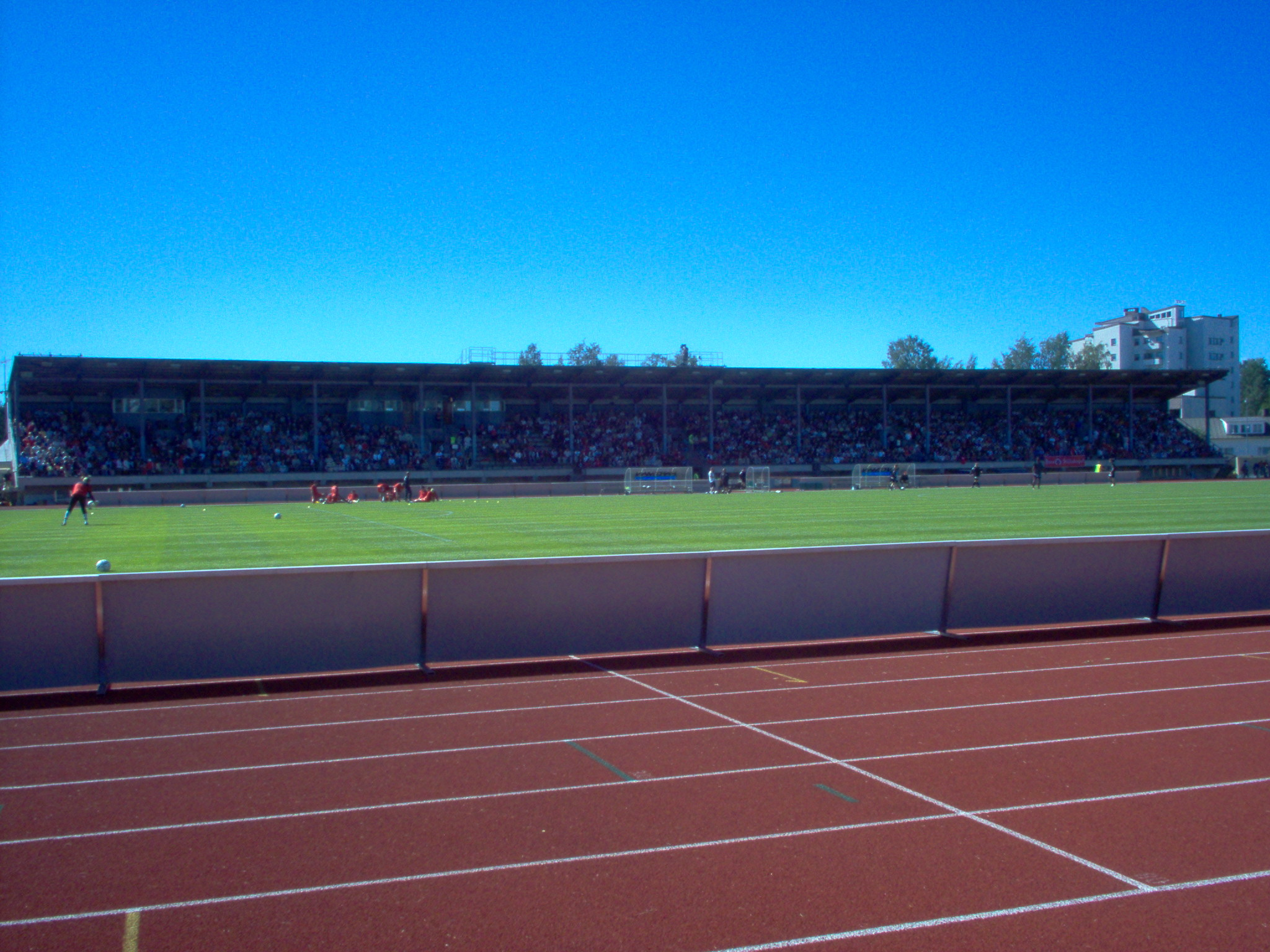
Jakobstads Centralplan

Until July 2025, Jaro played their home games at Jakobstads Centralplan, a stadium originally opened in 1971 and renovated in 2003. The venue has a capacity of approximately 5,000 spectators. The stadium's attendance record of 5,611 was set during a 2007 Veikkausliiga local derby between FF Jaro and VPS. This match drew nearly 1,300 more spectators than the previous record.

The new Pietarsaari Football Stadium (named Project Liv Arena for sponsorship reasons) opened in July 2025.

== Current squad ==
As of 6 September, 2026

Note: Flags indicate national team as defined under FIFA eligibility rules; some limited exceptions apply. Players may hold more than one non-FIFA nationality.

No.	Pos.	Nation	Player
1	GK	BEL	Senne Vits
2	DF	FIN	Felix Kass
3	DF	SWE	Erik Gunnarsson
4	MF	NGR	Michael Ogungbaro
5	DF	FIN	Aron Bjonbäck
6	DF	FIN	Johan Brunell
7	MF	NOR	Jesper Skau
8	MF	SYR	Oliver Kass Kawo
9	FW	SWE	Linus Zetterström
10	MF	FIN	Luca Weckström
12	GK	FIN	Joas Snellman
13	MF	FIN	Altti Hellemaa (on loan from Elfsborg)
16	MF	FIN	Adam Vidjeskog
18	FW	FIN	Elliot Holmäng
19	DF	NOR	Fabian Ness

No.	Pos.	Nation	Player
20	DF	FIN	Ted Söderström
21	DF	FIN	Jim Myrevik
22	MF	FIN	Kaius Hardén
23	FW	ENG	Jonathan Lawson
24	MF	FIN	Valde Löfs
25	DF	HUN	Gergő Kocsis
26	MF	NOR	Mats Pedersen (on loan from HamKam)
27	FW	FIN	Joas Vikström
29	FW	SWE	Devin Laroussi
30	FW	FIN	Morteza Najafi
31	GK	FIN	Anton Finell
42	FW	FIN	Joni Remesaho
77	FW	SOM	Abdi Sabriye (on loan from Kalmar FF)
91	FW	FIN	Ville Vuorinen

=== Out on loan ===
Note: Flags indicate national team as defined under FIFA eligibility rules; some limited exceptions apply. Players may hold more than one non-FIFA nationality.

No.	Pos.	Nation	Player

== Management and boardroom ==
=== Management ===
As of 5 January 2026

Name	Role
(Sweden) Jens Karlsson	Head coach
(Finland) Christian Sund	Assistant coach
(Finland) Johannes Karf	Goalkeeping coach
(Finland) Jeremias Klemets	Fitness coach
(Finland) Johan Hult	Naprapath
(Finland) Jesper Ahlvik	Masseur
(Finland) Veppe Tervaskangas	Team Manager
(Finland) Tobias Sundberg	Doctor

=== Boardroom ===
As of 5 February 2026

Name	Role
(Finland) Tommy Löfs	Chairman
(Finland) Dan Käldman	CEO
(Finland) Maria Ljungeld	COO
(United States) Chris Corcoran	Team Manager
(Finland) Mikael Byggmästar	Chairman of the Youthsection
(Finland) Ida-Marie Jungell	Head of Marketing

== Season to season ==
Season to Season

Season	Level	Division	Section	Administration	Position	Movements
1966	Tier 3	Maakuntasarja (Third Division)	Group 8 – Vaasa & Central Ostrobothnia	Finnish FA (Suomen Palloliitto)	1st	Promoted
1967	Tier 2	Suomensarja (Second Division)	North Group	Finnish FA (Suomen Palloliitto)	4th	
1968	Tier 2	Suomensarja (Second Division)	North Group	Finnish FA (Suomen Palloliitto)	7th	
1969	Tier 2	Suomensarja (Second Division)	North Group	Finnish FA (Suomen Palloliitto)	9th	Relegated
1970	Tier 3	III Divisioona (Third Division)	Group 7 – Vaasa & Central Ostrobothnia	Finnish FA (Suomen Palloliitto)	1st	Promoted
1971	Tier 2	II Divisioona (Second Division)	North Group	Finnish FA (Suomen Palloliitto)	7th	
1972	Tier 2	II Divisioona (Second Division)	North Group	Finnish FA (Suomen Palloliitto)	2nd	
1973	Tier 2	I Divisioona (First Division)		Finnish FA (Suomen Palloliitto)	12th	Relegated
1974	Tier 3	II Divisioona (Second Division)	North Group	Finnish FA (Suomen Palloliitto)	5th	
1975	Tier 3	II Divisioona (Second Division)	North Group	Finnish FA (Suomen Palloliitto)	9th	
1976	Tier 3	II Divisioona (Second Division)	North Group	Finnish FA (Suomen Palloliitto)	4th	
1977	Tier 3	II Divisioona (Second Division)	North Group	Finnish FA (Suomen Palloliitto)	7th	
1978	Tier 3	II Divisioona (Second Division)	North Group	Finnish FA (Suomen Palloliitto)	5th	
1979	Tier 3	II Divisioona (Second Division)	North Group	Finnish FA (Suomen Palloliitto)	1st	Promotion Playoff – Promoted
1980	Tier 2	I Divisioona (First Division)		Finnish FA (Suomen Palloliitto)	8th	Relegation Group 5th
1981	Tier 2	I Divisioona (First Division)		Finnish FA (Suomen Palloliitto)	9th	Relegation Group 5th
1982	Tier 2	I Divisioona (First Division)		Finnish FA (Suomen Palloliitto)	8th	Relegation Group 2nd
1983	Tier 2	I Divisioona (First Division)		Finnish FA (Suomen Palloliitto)	4th	Promotion Group 5th
1984	Tier 2	I Divisioona (First Division)		Finnish FA (Suomen Palloliitto)	6th	
1985	Tier 2	I Divisioona (First Division)		Finnish FA (Suomen Palloliitto)	4th	
1986	Tier 2	I Divisioona (First Division)		Finnish FA (Suomen Palloliitto)	10th	Relegated
1987	Tier 3	II Divisioona (Second Division)	North Group	Finnish FA (Suomen Palloliitto)	1st	Promoted
1988	Tier 2	I Divisioona (First Division)		Finnish FA (Suomen Palloliitto)	1st	Promoted
1989	Tier 1	Veikkausliiga (Premier League)		Finnish FA (Suomen Palloliitto)	12th	Relegated
1990	Tier 2	I Divisioona (First Division)		Finnish FA (Suomen Palloliitto)	2nd	Promotion Playoff – Promoted
1991	Tier 1	Veikkausliiga (Premier League)		Finnish FA (Suomen Palloliitto)	4th	
1992	Tier 1	Veikkausliiga (Premier League)		Finnish FA (Suomen Palloliitto)	5th	
1993	Tier 1	Veikkausliiga (Premier League)		Finnish FA (Suomen Palloliitto)	11th	Relegation group 2nd
1994	Tier 1	Veikkausliiga (Premier League)		Finnish FA (Suomen Palloliitto)	7th	
1995	Tier 1	Veikkausliiga (Premier League)		Finnish FA (Suomen Palloliitto)	5th	
1996	Tier 1	Veikkausliiga (Premier League)		Finnish FA (Suomen Palloliitto)	1st	Upper Group – 5th
1997	Tier 1	Veikkausliiga (Premier League)		Finnish FA (Suomen Palloliitto)	8th	Third round – 8th
1998	Tier 1	Veikkausliiga (Premier League)		Finnish FA (Suomen Palloliitto)	9th	Third round – 10th – Relegated
1999	Tier 2	Ykkönen (First Division)	North Group	Finnish FA (Suomen Palloliitto)	2nd	Promotion Group – 3rd – Play-offs
2000	Tier 2	Ykkönen (First Division)	North Group	Finnish FA (Suomen Palloliitto)	2nd	Promotion Group – 5th
2001	Tier 2	Ykkönen (First Division)	North Group	Finnish FA (Suomen Palloliitto)	2nd	Play-offs – Promoted
2002	Tier 1	Veikkausliiga (Premier League)		Finnish FA (Suomen Palloliitto)	8th	Upper Group – 7th
2003	Tier 1	Veikkausliiga (Premier League)		Finnish FA (Suomen Palloliitto)	8th	
2004	Tier 1	Veikkausliiga (Premier League)		Finnish FA (Suomen Palloliitto)	11th	
2005	Tier 1	Veikkausliiga (Premier League)		Finnish FA (Suomen Palloliitto)	11th	
2006	Tier 1	Veikkausliiga (Premier League)		Finnish FA (Suomen Palloliitto)	12th	
2007	Tier 1	Veikkausliiga (Premier League)		Finnish FA (Suomen Palloliitto)	11th	
2008	Tier 1	Veikkausliiga (Premier League)		Finnish FA (Suomen Palloliitto)	9th	
2009	Tier 1	Veikkausliiga (Premier League)		Finnish FA (Suomen Palloliitto)	10th	
2010	Tier 1	Veikkausliiga (Premier League)		Finnish FA (Suomen Palloliitto)	5th	
2011	Tier 1	Veikkausliiga (Premier League)		Finnish FA (Suomen Palloliitto)	11th	
2012	Tier 1	Veikkausliiga (Premier League)		Finnish FA (Suomen Palloliitto)	11th	
2013	Tier 1	Veikkausliiga (Premier League)		Finnish FA (Suomen Palloliitto)	10th	
2014	Tier 1	Veikkausliiga (Premier League)		Finnish FA (Suomen Palloliitto)	6th	
2015	Tier 1	Veikkausliiga (Premier League)		Finnish FA (Suomen Palloliitto)	12th	Relegated
2016	Tier 2	Ykkönen (First Division)		Finnish FA (Suomen Palloliitto)	3rd	
2017	Tier 2	Ykkönen (First Division)		Finnish FA (Suomen Pallolitto)	5th	
2018	Tier 2	Ykkönen (First Division)		Finnish FA (Suomen Pallolitto)	6th	
2019	Tier 2	Ykkönen (First Division)		Finnish FA (Suomen Pallolitto)	3rd	
2020	Tier 2	Ykkönen (First Division)		Finnish FA (Suomen Pallolitto)	3rd	
2021	Tier 2	Ykkönen (First Division)		Finnish FA (Suomen Pallolitto)	4th	
2022	Tier 2	Ykkönen (First Division)		Finnish FA (Suomen Pallolitto)	3rd	
2023	Tier 2	Ykkönen (First Division)		Finnish FA (Suomen Pallolitto)	9th	
2024	Tier 2	Ykkösliiga (First Division)		Finnish FA (Suomen Pallolitto)	2nd	Promotion play-offs – Promoted

- 23 seasons in Veikkausliiga
- 27 seasons in Ykkönen/Ykkösliiga
- 9 seasons in Kakkonen

== International achievements ==
=== 1996 UEFA Intertoto Cup ===
FF Jaro – (France) Guingamp 0-0
(Romania) Dinamo Bucharest – FF Jaro 0–2
FF Jaro – (Georgia (country)) Kolkheti Poti 2–0
(Serbia) Zemun – FF Jaro 3–2

== Former managers ==
- (Finland) Börje Nygård (1966–67)
- (Finland) Rainer Aho (1968–70)
- Matti Aarni (1971–74)
- Bjarne Sjöholm (1975–77)
- Esko Vikman (1978)
- (Sweden) Ulf Larsson (1979)
- Bjarne Sjöholm (1980)
- Jan–Eric Holmberg (1981)
- Kalle Jaskari (1982–84)
- Matti Huotari (1985)
- Kalle Jaskari (1986)
- (England) Richard Wilson (1987–89)
- (Finland) Kari Mars (1989)
- (Finland) Hannu Touru (1990–93)
- (Finland) Antti Muurinen (1994–96)
- (Finland) Veijo Wahlsten (1997)
- (Finland) Keijo Paananen (1997)
- (Sweden) Janne Westerlund (1998)
- (Finland) Keijo Paananen (1999–01)
- (Finland) Sixten Boström (2002–04)
- (Finland) Hannu Touru (2004–05), (2006)
- (Finland) Mika Laurikainen (2007–09)
- (Russia) (Finland) Alexei Eremenko Sr. (Aug 19, 2009–Jun 10, 2016)
- (England) Kristian Heames (Jul 28, 2016–Jul 10, 2017)
- (Finland) Calle Löf (Jul 11, 2017-Oct, 2017)
- (Finland) Tomi Kärkkäinen (Jan 1, 2018-Aug 13, 2018)
- (Finland) Niklas Käcko (Aug 14, 2018-Dec 31, 2020)
- (Finland) Jimmy Wargh (Jan 1, 2021–Oct, 2022)
- (England) Stephen Ward (2023)
- (Finland) Niklas Vidjeskog (Jan 1, 2024 – present)
