= Jakobstads BK =

Finnish football club

- Full name: Jakobstads Bollklubb
- Nicknames: JBK, Klubbi
- Founded: 1944
- Ground: Project Liv Arena, Jakobstad; Finland
- Capacity: 3616
- Chairman: Johan Nyman
- Coach: Walter Moore
- League: Kakkonen
- 2026: Kakkonen Group C, 3rd of 10
Home colours

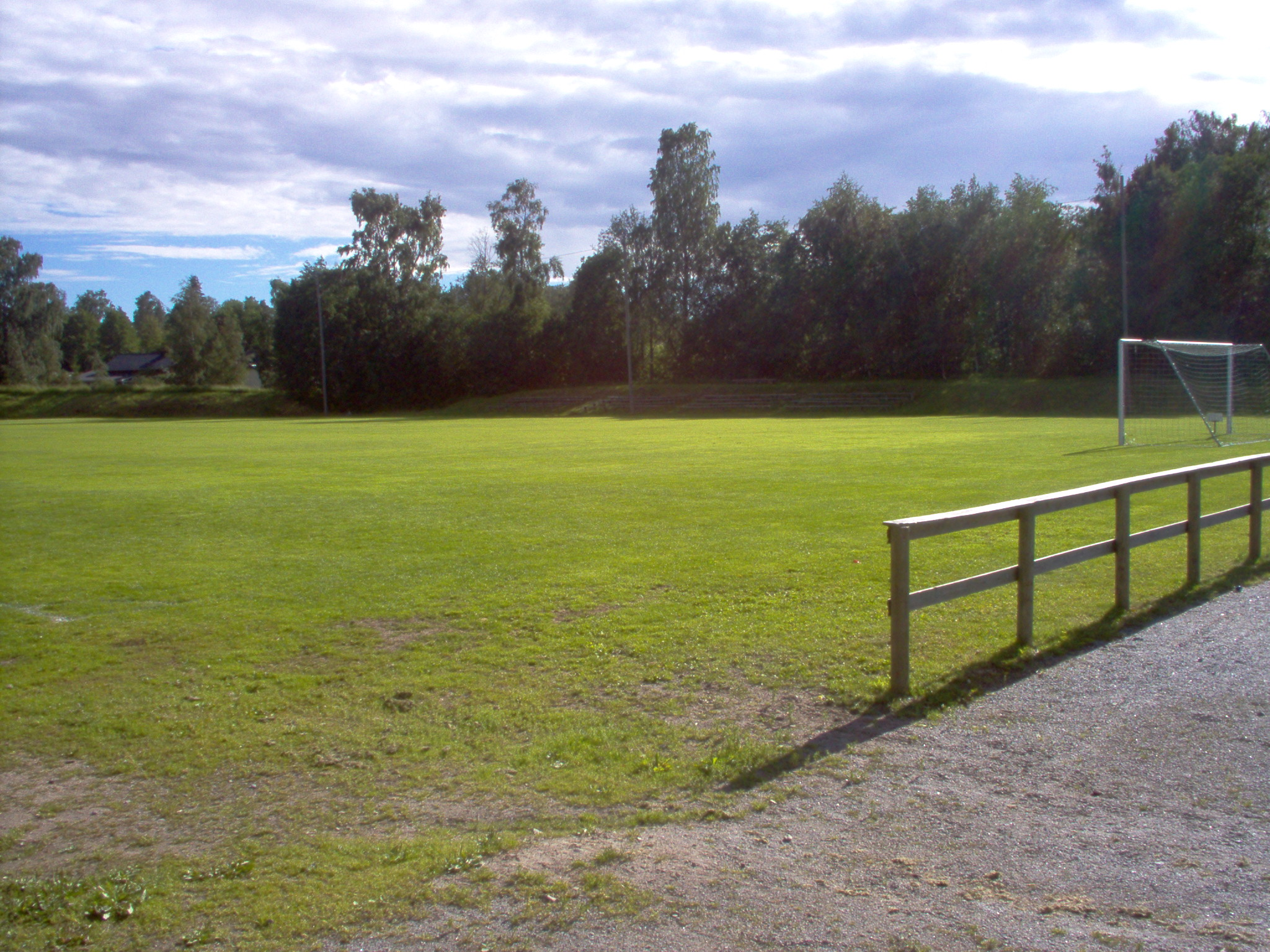
Västra plan

Jakobstads Bollklubb, also known as JBK, is a Finnish Football team from Jakobstad currently playing in Kakkonen, a fourth-tier soccer league in Finland. The club's home venue is Project Liv Arena.

== History ==
The club was founded at a meeting held on December 14, 1944. Jakobstads Bollklubb's first official match was played on May 10, 1945, against NIK. The team's captain at that time, Lasse Hellund, scored the club's first goal. JBK later won the match 3–1.

The club's early history was significant as they played 16 seasons in the Suomisarja (Finland League), which at that time was the second tier of Finnish football, over three periods from 1948, 1950 and 1952–65.

More recently, JBK has mostly been represented in Kakkonen or in regional leagues (Kolmonen and lower). Since the early 1970s, the club has played in Kakkonen for 23 seasons in total (1973–75, 1977–78, 1996–97, 1999–2011, 2014–2015 and 2017).

=== Season to season ===
Season to season of JBK
- 16 seasons in 2nd tier
- 36 seasons in 3rd tier
- 17 seasons in 4th tier
- 9 seasons in 5th tier

| Season | Level | Division | Section | Administration | Position | Movements |
|---|---|---|---|---|---|---|
| 1948 | Tier 2 | Suomensarja (Finland Series) | North Group | Finnish FA (Suomen Palloliitto) | 12th | Relegated |
| 1949 | Tier 3 | Suomensarjan Karsinnat | Cup-format | Finnish FA (Suomen Pallolitto) Finnish Workers Sports Federation (Työväen Urheiluliitto) | | Pariticipated in qualifications as a TUL member - Promoted |
| 1950 | Tier 2 | Suomensarja (Finland Series) | West Group | Finnish FA (Suomen Palloliitto) | 10th | Relegated |
| 1951 | Tier 3 | Suomensarjan Karsinnat (Finland Series Qualifiers) | West Group | Finnish FA (Suomen Palloliitto)Finnish Workers Sports Federation (Työväen Urheiluliitto) | 1st | Promoted |
| 1952 | Tier 2 | Suomensarja (Finland Series) | West Group | Finnish FA (Suomen Palloliitto) | 4th | |
| 1953 | Tier 2 | Suomensarja (Finland Series) | WestGroup | Finnish FA (Suomen Palloliitto) | 3rd | |
| 1954 | Tier 2 | Suomensarja (Finland Series) | West Group | Finnish FA (Suomen Palloliitto) | 2nd | |
| 1955 | Tier 2 | Suomensarja (Finland Series) | West Group | Finnish FA (Suomen Palloliitto) | 3rd | |
| 1956 | Tier 2 | Suomensarja (Finland Series) | West Group | Finnish FA (Suomen Palloliitto) | 7th | |
| 1957 | Tier 2 | Suomensarja (Finland Series) | West Group | Finnish FA (Suomen Palloliitto) | 8th | |
| 1958 | Tier 2 | Suomensarja (Finland Series) | North Group | Finnish FA (Suomen Palloliitto) | 7th | |
| 1959 | Tier 2 | Suomensarja (Finland Series) | North Group | Finnish FA (Suomen Palloliitto) | 9th | |
| 1960 | Tier 2 | Suomensarja (Finland Series) | North Group | Finnish FA (Suomen Palloliitto) | 5th | |
| 1961 | Tier 2 | Suomensarja (Finland Series) | North Group | Finnish FA (Suomen Palloliitto) | 8th | |
| 1962 | Tier 2 | Suomensarja (Finland Series) | North Group | Finnish FA (Suomen Palloliitto) | 8th | |
| 1963 | Tier 2 | Suomensarja (Finland Series) | North Group | Finnish FA (Suomen Palloliitto) | 6th | |
| 1964 | Tier 2 | Suomensarja (Finland Series) | North Group | Finnish FA (Suomen Palloliitto) | 2nd | |
| 1965 | Tier 2 | Suomensarja (Finland Series) | North Group | Finnish FA (Suomen Palloliitto) | 11th | Relegated |
| 1966 | Tier 3 | Maakuntasarja (Regional League) | Group 8 Vaasa & Central Ostrobothnia | Finnish FA (Suomen Pallolitto) | 8th | Relegated |
| 1967 | Tier 4 | Aluesarja (Area League) | Group 16 Central Ostrobothnia | Finnish FA (Suomen Pallolitto) | 1st | Promotion Playoff |
| 1968 | Tier 4 | Aluesarja (Area League) | Group 15 Central Ostrobothnia | Finnish FA (Suomen Pallolitto) | 1st | Promoted |
| 1969 | Tier 3 | Maakuntasarja (Regional League) | Group 7 Vaasa & Central Ostrobothnia | Finnish FA (Suomen Pallolitto) | 7th | |
| 1970 | Tier 3 | 3. Divisioona (Third Division) | Group 7 Vaasa & Central Ostrobothnia | Finnish FA (Suomen Pallolitto) | 3rd | |
| 1971 | Tier 3 | 3. Divisioona (Third Division) | Group 7 Central Ostrobothnia & Northern Finland | Finnish FA (Suomen Pallolitto) | 2nd | |
| 1972 | Tier 3 | 3. Divisioona (Third Division) | Group 8 Vaasa & Central Ostrobothnia | Finnish FA (Suomen Pallolitto) | 1st | Promoted |
| 1973 | Tier 3 | 2. Divisioona (Second Division) | North Group | Finnish FA (Suomen Pallolitto) | 6th | |
| 1974 | Tier 3 | 2. Divisioona (Second Division) | North Group | Finnish FA (Suomen Pallolitto) | 8th | |
| 1975 | Tier 3 | 2. Divisioona (Second Division) | North Group | Finnish FA (Suomen Pallolitto) | 12th | Relegated |
| 1976 | Tier 4 | 3. Divisioona (Third Division) | Group 8 Central Ostrobothnia & Vaasa | Finnish FA (Suomen Pallolitto) | 1st | Promoted |
| 1977 | Tier 3 | 2. Divisioona (Second Division) | North Group | Finnish FA (Suomen Pallolitto) | 5th | |
| 1978 | Tier 3 | 2. Divisioona (Second Division) | North Group | Finnish FA (Suomen Pallolitto) | 10th | Relegated |
| 1979 | Tier 4 | 3. Divisioona (Third Division) | Group 8 Central Ostrobothnia & Vaasa | Finnish FA (Suomen Pallolitto) | 5th | |
| 1980 | Tier 4 | 3. Divisioona (Third Division) | Group 8 Central Ostrobothnia & Vaasa | Finnish FA (Suomen Pallolitto) | 1st | Promotion Playoff |
| 1981 | Tier 4 | 3. Divisioona (Third Division) | Group 8 Central Ostrobothnia & Vaasa | Finnish FA (Suomen Pallolitto) | 6th | |
| 1982 | Tier 4 | 3. Divisioona (Third Division) | Group 8 Central Ostrobothnia & Vaasa | Finnish FA (Suomen Pallolitto) | 3rd | |
| 1983 | Tier 4 | 3. Divisioona (Third Division) | Group 8 Central Ostrobothnia & Vaasa | Finnish FA (Suomen Pallolitto) | 8th | |
| 1984 | Tier 4 | 3. Divisioona (Third Division) | Group 8 Central Ostrobothnia & Vaasa | Finnish FA (Suomen Pallolitto) | 12th | Relegated |
| 1985 | Tier 5 | 4. Divisioona (Fourth Division) | Group 16 Central Ostrobothnia | Finnish FA (Suomen Pallolitto) | 2nd | |
| 1986 | Tier 5 | 4. Divisioona (Fourth Division) | Group 16 Central Ostrobothnia | Finnish FA (Suomen Pallolitto) | 7th | |
| 1987 | Tier 5 | 4. Divisioona (Fourth Division) | Group 16 Central Ostrobothnia | Central Ostrobothnia (SPL Keski-Pohjanmaa) | 7th | |
| 1988 | Tier 5 | 4. Divisioona (Fourth Division) | Group 16 Central Ostrobothnia | Central Ostrobothnia (SPL Keski-Pohjanmaa) | 5th | |
| 1989 | Tier 5 | 4. Divisioona (Fourth Division) | Group 16 Central Ostrobothnia | Central Ostrobothnia (SPL Keski-Pohjanmaa) | 5th | |
| 1990 | Tier 5 | 4. Divisioona (Fourth Division) | Group 16 Central Ostrobothnia | Central Ostrobothnia (SPL Keski-Pohjanmaa) | 6th | |
| 1991 | Tier 5 | 4. Divisioona (Fourth Division) | Group 16 Central Ostrobothnia | Central Ostrobothnia (SPL Keski-Pohjanmaa) | 9th | |
| 1992 | Tier 5 | 4. Divisioona (Fourth Division) | Group 16 Central Ostrobothnia | Central Ostrobothnia (SPL Keski-Pohjanmaa) | 2nd | |
| 1993 | Tier 5 | Nelonen (Fourth Division) | Group 16 Central Ostrobothnia | Central Ostrobothnia (SPL Keski-Pohjanmaa) | 2nd | Promotion Playoff - Promoted |
| 1994 | Tier 4 | Kolmonen (Third Division) | Group 7 Central Ostrobothnia & Vaasa | Finnish FA (Suomen Pallolitto) | 9th | |
| 1995 | Tier 4 | Kolmonen (Third Division) | Group 7 Central Ostrobothnia & Vaasa | Finnish FA (Suomen Pallolitto) | 2nd | Promoted |
| 1996 | Tier 3 | Kakkonen (Second Division) | North Group | Finnish FA (Suomen Pallolitto) | 8th | |
| 1997 | Tier 3 | Kakkonen (Second Division) | West Group | Finnish FA (Suomen Pallolitto) | 12th | Relegated |
| 1998 | Tier 4 | Kolmonen (Third Division) | Group 7 Central Ostrobothnia & Vaasa | Central Ostrobothnia (SPL Keski-Pohjanmaa) | 1st | Promoted |
| 1999 | Tier 3 | Kakkonen (Second Division) | North Group | Finnish FA (Suomen Pallolitto) | 7th | |
| 2000 | Tier 3 | Kakkonen (Second Division) | North Group | Finnish FA (Suomen Pallolitto) | 2nd | Promotion Playoff |
| 2001 | Tier 3 | Kakkonen (Second Division) | North Group | Finnish FA (Suomen Pallolitto) | 3rd | |
| 2002 | Tier 3 | Kakkonen (Second Division) | North Group | Finnish FA (Suomen Pallolitto) | 3rd | |
| 2003 | Tier 3 | Kakkonen (Second Division) | North Group | Finnish FA (Suomen Pallolitto) | 6th | |
| 2004 | Tier 3 | Kakkonen (Second Division) | Northern Group | Finnish FA (Suomen Pallolitto) | 3rd | |
| 2005 | Tier 3 | Kakkonen (Second Division) | Northern Group | Finnish FA (Suomen Pallolitto) | 6th | |
| 2006 | Tier 3 | Kakkonen (Second Division) | Group C | Finnish FA (Suomen Pallolitto) | 3rd | |
| 2007 | Tier 3 | Kakkonen (Second Division) | Group C | Finnish FA (Suomen Pallolitto) | 6th | |
| 2008 | Tier 3 | Kakkonen (Second Division) | Group C | Finnish FA (Suomen Pallolitto) | 7th | |
| 2009 | Tier 3 | Kakkonen (Second Division) | Group C | Finnish FA (Suomen Pallolitto) | 7th | |
| 2010 | Tier 3 | Kakkonen (Second Division) | Group C | Finnish FA (Suomen Pallolitto) | 10th | |
| 2011 | Tier 3 | Kakkonen (Second Division) | Group C | Finnish FA (Suomen Pallolitto) | 11th | Relegated |
| 2012 | Tier 4 | Kolmonen (Third Division) | Central Ostrobothnia & Vaasa | Central Ostrobothnia (SPL Keski-Pohjanmaa) | 2nd | |
| 2013 | Tier 4 | Kolmonen (Third Division) | Central Ostrobothnia & Vaasa | Central Ostrobothnia (SPL Keski-Pohjanmaa) | 1st | Promoted |
| 2014 | Tier 3 | Kakkonen (Second Division) | Northern Group | Finnish FA (Suomen Pallolitto) | 8th | |
| 2015 | Tier 3 | Kakkonen (Second Division) | Northern Group | Finnish FA (Suomen Pallolitto) | 8th | Relegated |
| 2016 | Tier 4 | Kolmonen (Third Division) | Central Ostrobothnia & Vaasa | Central Ostrobothnia (SPL Keski-Pohjanmaa) | 1st | Promoted |
| 2017 | Tier 3 | Kakkonen (Second Division) | Group C | Finnish FA (Suomen Pallolitto) | 7th | |
| 2018 | Tier 3 | Kakkonen (Second Division) | Group C | Finnish FA (Suomen Pallolitto) | 7th | |
| 2019 | Tier 3 | Kakkonen (Second Division) | Group C | Finnish FA (Suomen Pallolitto) | 4th | |
| 2020 | Tier 3 | Kakkonen (Second Division) | Group C | Finnish FA (Suomen Pallolitto) | 4th | |
| 2021 | Tier 3 | Kakkonen (Second Division) | Group C | Finnish FA (Suomen Pallolitto) | 6th | |
| 2022 | Tier 3 | Kakkonen (Second Division) | Group C | Finnish FA (Suomen Pallolitto) | 10th | |
| 2023 | Tier 3 | Kakkonen (Second Division) | Group C | Finnish FA (Suomen Pallolitto) | 12th | |
| 2024 | Tier 4 | Kakkonen (Second Division) | Group C | Finnish FA (Suomen Pallolitto) | 2nd | Promotion Playoff |
| 2025 | Tier 4 | Kakkonen (Second Division) | Group C | Finnish FA (Suomen Pallolitto) | | |

== References and sources ==
- Official Website
- Finnish Wikipedia
- Suomen Cup
- JBK Facebook
