= 1955 Finnish Cup =

1955 Suomen Cup
Tournament details
- Country: Finland
- Teams: 31

The 1955 Finnish Cup (Finnish: Suomen Cup) was the 1st season of the main annual association football cup competition in Finland. It was organised as a single-elimination knock–out tournament and participation in the competition was voluntary. The final was held at the Olympic Stadium, Helsinki on 20 November 1955 with Valkeakosken Haka defeating Helsingin Palloseura by 5-1 before an attendance of 3,021 spectators.

== Round 1 ==
Tie no	Home team	Score	Away team	Information
1	Kokkolan Pallo-Veikot	2-7	Vaasan Palloseura	
2	Jakobstads Bollklubb	0-2	Valkeakosken Haka	
3	Kuopion Pallotoverit	3-1	Kajaanin Palloilijat	
4	IF Drott	3-0	Sudet	
5	Gamlakarleby Bollklubb	3-3	Kotkan Jäntevä	GBK by lots
6	Turun Palloseura	7-1	Helsingin Ponnistus	
7	Tampereen Kisa-Toverit	1-3	Pallo-Pojat	
8	Rauman Iirot	3-1	Käpylän Urheilu-Veikot	
9	Lappeenrannan Pallotoverit	1-2	Rauman Pallo	

Tie no	Home team	Score	Away team	Information
10	Oulun Työväen Palloilijat	2-2	Kuopion Palloseura	KuPS by lots
11	HIFK	2-3	Turun Pyrkivä	
12	Hämeenlinnan Pallokerho	2-3	Turun Toverit	
13	Helsingin Palloseura	5-1	Kotkan Reipas	
14	Hangö Idrottsklubb	0-4	Kronohagens IF	
15	Kotkan Työväen Palloilijat	0-4	Helsingin Jalkapalloklubi	
16	Kokkolan Jymy	bye		

== Round 2 ==
Tie no	Home team	Score	Away team	Information
1	Rauman Pallo	3-4	Rauman Iirot	
2	Turun Toverit	1-3	Turun Palloseura	
3	Gamlakarleby Bollklubb	3-2	Turun Pyrkivä	
4	Vaasan Palloseura	2-3	Valkeakosken Haka	

Tie no	Home team	Score	Away team	Information
5	Kuopion Pallotoverit	2-4	IF Drott	
6	Pallo-Pojat	1-5	Kuopion Palloseura	
7	Kokkolan Jymy	0-3	Kronohagens IF	
8	Helsingin Jalkapalloklubi	3-5	Helsingin Palloseura	

== Quarter-finals ==
Tie no	Home team	Score	Away team	Information
1	Rauman Iirot	3-2	Turun Palloseura	
2	Gamlakarleby Bollklubb	1-6	Valkeakosken Haka	

Tie no	Home team	Score	Away team	Information
3	IF Drott	2-1	Kuopion Palloseura	
4	Kronohagens IF	1-5	Helsingin Palloseura	

== Semi-finals ==
Tie no	Home team	Score	Away team	Information
1	Rauman Iirot	1-4	Valkeakosken Haka	

Tie no	Home team	Score	Away team	Information
2	IF Drott	1-2	Helsingin Palloseura	

== Final ==
Date	Team 1	Score	Team 2	Information
20.11.1955	Valkeakosken Haka	5-1	Helsingin Palloseura	Att. 3,021

== See also ==
- 1955 Mestaruussarja
