= 1956 Finnish Cup =

1956 Suomen Cup
Tournament details
- Country: Finland
- Teams: 161

The 1956 Finnish Cup (Finnish: Suomen Cup) was the 2nd season of the main annual association football cup competition in Finland. It was organised as a single-elimination knock–out tournament and participation in the competition was voluntary. The final was held at the Olympic Stadium, Helsinki on 28 October 1956 with Pallo-Pojat defeating Tampereen Kisatoverit by 2–1 before an attendance of 2,020 spectators.

== Preliminary round 1 ==
Tie no	Home team	Score	Away team	Notes
1	Jyväskylän Palloilijat	3–5	Suolahden Urho	
2	Kellokosken Alku	0–3	Helsingin Jyry	
3	Karkkilan Sisu	8–1	Virkkalan Kiri	
4	Köklax BolIklubb	1–10	Kampin Pallo-50	
5	Imatran Pallo	0–4	Lauritsalan Työväen Palloilijat	
6	Mikkelin Palloilijat	2–0	Lappeenrannan Pallo	
7	Pieksämäen Pallo-Sepot	6–1	Joensuun Pallo	
8	Jämsänkosken Ilves	5–1	Jyväskylän Toverit	
9	IF-Kamraterna Mariehamn	2–4	Turun Veikot	
10	Pargas Idrottsförening	0–5	Turun Pallokerho	
11	Kajaanin Reipas	4–2	Kuopion Pallo-48	
12	Oulun Luistinseura	5–4	Ykspihlajan Reima	
13	Tyrvään Voima	2–4	Kortelan Ryhti	
14	Turun Pallo	0–1	Turun Teräs	
15	Töölön Urheilijat-53	1–4	Kruunuhaan Pallo-Veikot	
16	Turun Kisa-Veikot	0–1	Turun Yritys	
17	Oulun Palloseura	8–0	Oulun Jyry	
18	Karihaaran Visa	0–3	Kemin Into	
19	Malmin Palloseura	0–5	Toverit Helsinki	
20	Lauttasaaren Pyrintö	4–2	Helsingin Ilves	
21	Pukinmäen Veto	3–0	Drumsö Idrottsklubb	
22	Makkabi Helsinki	3–1	Karhun-Pojat	
23	Oulunkylän Työv Urheilijat	1–5	Töölön Vesa	
24	Porvoon Veikot	2–1	IF Vargarna	
25	Esbo Bollklubb	1–3	Yolduz	
26	Järvenpään Palloseura	3–2	Arsenal	
27	Hyvinkään Palloseura	0–2	Hyvinkään Apollo	
28	Hämeenlinnan Ahmat	0–5	Riihimäen Palloseura	
29	Iitin Pallo-Pojat	0–7	Viipurin Reipas	
30	IF Tor	4–1	Loviisan Riento	
31	Kotkan Kiri	7–4	Kotkan Palloseura	
32	Haminan Pallo-Kissat	0–9	Kymin Palloilijat	

Tie no	Home team	Score	Away team	Notes
33	Myllykosken Pallo-47	0–1	Kouvolan Urheilijain Palloilijat	
34	Pallo-Peikot	2–4	Kuusankosken Puhti	
35	Lahden Pallo-Miehet	1–0	Sorvalin Veikot	
36	Saimaan Pallo	0–4	Veiterä	
37	Savonlinnan Pallokerho	0–1	Savonlinnan Työväen Palloseura	
38	Warkauden Pallo-35	7–1	Varkauden Työväen Palloilijat	
39	Äänekosken Huima	3–2	Äänekosken Palloseura	
40	Joensuun Palloseura	2–1	Joensuun Pallotoverit	
41	Pallokerho-37	1–6	Iisalmen Palloveikot	
42	Salon Vilpas	1–2	Salon Palloilijat	
43	Littoisten Työv Urheilijat	6–2	Turun Jyry	
44	Ruosniemen Visa	2–3	Porin Palloilijat	
45	Harjavallan Pallo	3–2	Porin Kärpät	
46	Lielahden Kipinä	7–1	Tampereen Yntys	
47	Lamminpään Korpi	1–4	Tampereen Palloilijat	
48	Tahmelan Vesa	4–7	Nokian Pyry	
49	Pallo-Sepot-44	1–4	Valkeakosken Koskenpojat	
50	Viialan Viri	3–1	Viialan Pyry	
51	Toijalan Pallo-49	4–2	Forssan Palloseura	
52	Mäntän Valo	w/o	Tampereen Pallotoverit	TPT withdrew
53	Seinäjoen Sisu	3–1	Lapuan Virkiä	
54	Sport	7–3	Meteor	
55	Pietarsaaren Into	8–0	Pedersöre-PoJkarna	
56	Oulun Työväen Palloilijat	8–0	Oulun Kärpät	
57	Kemin Palloseura	1–2	Karihaaran Tenho	
58	Rovaniemen Palloseura	3–1	Rovaniemen Lappi	
59	Porin Pallotoverit	1–2	Porin Veto	
60	Bollklubben-46	w/o	Ekenäs Idrottsförening	EIF withdrew

== Preliminary round 2 ==
Tie no	Home team	Score	Away team	Notes
61	Mikkelin Pallo-Kissat	5–0	Pieksämäen Pallo-Sepot	
62	Rovaniemen Palloseura	1–5	Karihaaran Tenho	
63	Warkauden Pallo-35	7–0	Mikkelin Palloilijat	
64	Vaasan Palloveikot	5–1	Sport, Vaasa	
65	Mäntän Valo	1–4	Seinäjoen Sisu	
66	Jämsänkosken Ilves	1–4	Tappara	
67	Toijalan Pallo-49	4–6	Riihimäen Palloseura	
68	Porin Veto	1–3	Porin Palloilijat	
69	Harjavallan Pallo	0–3	Rosenlewin Urheilijat-38	
70	Kortelan Ryhti	0–8	Rauman Pallo	
71	IF-Kamraterna Abo	0–4	Turun Veikot	
72	Bollklubben-46	3–0	Turun Teräs	
73	Salon Palloilijat	1–2	Turun Pallokerho	
74	Porvoon Veikot	1–3	Kullervo	
75	IF Tor	2–1	Akilles	
76	Kouvolan Urho Palloilijat	2–1	Kuusankosken Puhti	
77	Lauritsalan Työv Palloilijat	3–6	Veiterä	
78	Oulun Luistinseura	1–11	Oulun Työväen Palloilijat	
79	Pietarsaaren Into	1–2	Oulun Palloseura	

Tie no	Home team	Score	Away team	Notes
80	Viialan Viri	1–3	Valkeakosken Koskenpojat	
81	Karkkilan Sisu	2–5	Töölön Vesa	
82	Helsingin Jyry	5–3	Makkabi Helsinki	
83	Kampin Pallo-50	1–6	Toverit Helsinki	
84	IF Gnistan	4–1	Pukinmäen Veto	
85	Oulun Pallo-Pojat	1–8	Kemin Into	
86	Äänekosken Huima	5–2	Suolahden Urho	
87	Nokian Pyry	0–4	Tampereen Palloilijat	
88	Lielahden Kipinä	2–3	Tampereen Palloveikot	
89	Littoisten Työväen Urheilijat	1–2	Turun Yritys	
90	Hyvinkään Apollo	3–4	Helsingin Ponnistus	
91	Järvenpään Palloseura	2–0	Yolduz	
92	Kruunuhaan Palloveikot	0–6	Lauttasaaren Pyrintö	
93	Viipurin Reipas	5–1	Lahden Pallo-Miehet	
94	Kymin Palloilijat	6–1	Kotkan Kiri	
95	Iisalmen Palloveikot	0–7	Kuopion Elo	
96	Kajaanin Palloseura	4–3	Kajaanin Reipas	

== Round 1 ==
Tie no	Home team	Score	Away team	Notes
98	LPyrintö	w/o	TuTo Turku	LPyrintö withdrew
99	Toverit Helsinki	0–2	TKT Tampere	
100	JäPS Järvenpää	0–1	Ponnistus Helsinki	
101	KaPa Helsinki	1–3	KTP Kotka	
102	KUP Kouvola	3–2	Gnistan Helsinki	
103	MiPK Mikkeli	3–2	HIFK Helsinki	
104	OTP Oulu	3–6	HPK Hämeenlinna	
105	PoPa Pori	3–2	Jäntevä Kotka	
106	RiPS Riihimäki	5–3	Yritys Turku	
107	TaPa Tampere	0–4	Iirot Rauma	
108	Tenho Karihaara	5–2	JoPS Joensuu	
109	TPK Tampere	2–5	Drott Pietarsaari	
110	Veiterä Lappeenranta	1–4	KuP Kouvola	
111	Jymy Kokkola	3–2	VPS Vaasa	
112	Huima Äänekoski	2–12	HJK Helsinki	
113	VaK-P Valkeakoski	2–4	VReipas Lahti	

Tie no	Home team	Score	Away team	Notes
114	Tor Loviisa	1–2	RU-38 Pori	
115	Vesa Helsinki	1–4	Pallo-Pojat Helsinki	
116	Kullervo Helsinki	2–0	Haka Valkeakoski	
117	BK-46 Karjaa	1–3	GBK Kokkola	
118	Elo Kuopio	3–0	Tappara Tampere	
119	Jyry Helsinki	2–4	Sudet Helsinki	
120	KajPS Kajaani	2–1	HPS Helsinki	
121	KPV Kokkola	2–3	KUV Helsinki	
122	KyPa Kotka	2–1	TPS Turku	
123	LrPT Lappeenranta	1–8	Kiffen, Helsinki	
124	OPS Oulu	2–3	Rauman Pallo	
125	Sisu Seinäjoki	0–4	JBK Pietarsaari	
126	TPV Tampere	6–0	HIK Hanko	
127	TuVe Turku	2–1	VPV Vaasa	
128	WP-35 Warkau	1–2	KPT Kuopio	
129	Into Kemi	0–9	Ilves-Kissat Tampere	

== Round 2 ==
Tie no	Home team	Score	Away team	Notes
130	Kullervo Helsinki	1–2	TuTo Turku	
131	Drott Pietarsaari	0–2	Iirot Rauma	
132	Elo Kuopio	2–1	Jymy Kokkola	
133	HPK Hämeenlinna	1–2	GBK Kokkola	
134	KajPS Kajaani	2–4	TPV Tampere	
135	Pallo-Pojat Helsinki	6–0	JBK Pietarsaari	
136	KyPa Kotka	2–5	KTP Kotka	
137	MiPK Mikkeli	2–5	KPT Kuopio	

Tie no	Home team	Score	Away team	Notes
138	RU-38 Pori	5–0	Ponnistus Helsinki	
139	TKT Tampere	6–0	PoPa Pori	
140	TuVe Turku	3–1	Sudet Helsinki	
141	VReipas Lahti	2–4	KUV Helsinki	
142	RPallo, Rauma	1–3	Kiffen, Helsinki	
143	Tenho Karihaara	3–5	KuPS Kuopio	
144	KUP Kouvola	1–9	Ilves-Kissat Tampere	
145	RiPS Riihimäki	1–3	HJK Helsinki	

== Round 3 ==
Tie no	Home team	Score	Away team	Notes
146	KUV Helsinki	2–3	KTP Kotka	
147	TuTo Turku	2–5	Pallo-Pojat Helsinki	
148	GBK Kokkola	1–4	Kiffen, Helsinki	
149	TPV Tampere	3–2	Elo Kuopio	

Tie no	Home team	Score	Away team	Notes
150	Iirot Rauma	0–1	Ilves-Kissat Tampere	
151	Weikot Turku	1–3	TKT Tampere	
152	RU-38 Pori	1–4	HJK Helsinki	
153	KPT Kuopio	1–3	KuPS Kuopio	

== Quarter-finals ==
Tie no	Home team	Score	Away team	Notes
154	KTP Kotka	1–2	Pallo-Pojat Helsinki	
155	Kiffen, Helsinki	12–2	TPV Tampere	

Tie no	Home team	Score	Away team	Notes
156	Ilves-Kissat Tampere	1–3	TKT Tampere	
157	HJK Helsinki	1–0	KuPS Kuopio	

== Semi-finals ==
Tie no	Home team	Score	Away team	Notes
158	Pallo-Pojat Helsinki	2–1	Kiffen, Helsinki	

Tie no	Home team	Score	Away team	Notes
159	TKT Tampere	2–0	HJK Helsinki	

== Final ==
Date	Team 1	Score	Team 2	Notes
28.10.1956	Pallo-Pojat Helsinki	2–1	TKT Tampere	Att. 2,020

== See also ==
- 1956 Mestaruussarja
- 1956–59 Nordic Football Championship
