= 1955 Mestaruussarja =

Mestaruussarja
- Season: 1955
- Champions: KIF Helsinki
- Relegated: TuTo Turku; KoRe Kotka

The 1955 season was the 25th completed season of Finnish Football League Championship, known as the Mestaruussarja.

== Overview ==
The Mestaruussarja was administered by the Finnish Football Association and the competition's 1955 season was contested by 10 teams. KIF Helsinki won the championship and the two lowest placed teams of the competition, TuTo Turku and KoRe Kotka, were relegated to the Suomensarja.

== League standings ==
| Pos | Team | Pld | W | D | L | GF | GA | GD | Pts |
|---|---|---|---|---|---|---|---|---|---|
| 1 | KIF Helsinki (C) | 18 | 9 | 7 | 2 | 36 | 19 | +17 | 25 |
| 2 | Haka Valkeakoski | 18 | 10 | 3 | 5 | 41 | 27 | +14 | 23 |
| 3 | VIFK Vaasa | 18 | 7 | 7 | 4 | 38 | 22 | +16 | 21 |
| 4 | KuPS Kuopio | 18 | 7 | 6 | 5 | 38 | 21 | +17 | 20 |
| 5 | VPS Vaasa | 18 | 7 | 5 | 6 | 28 | 24 | +4 | 19 |
| 6 | KTP Kotka | 18 | 5 | 7 | 6 | 32 | 24 | +8 | 17 |
| 7 | Pyrkivä Turku | 18 | 7 | 3 | 8 | 27 | 37 | −10 | 17 |
| 8 | HJK Helsinki (Q) | 18 | 5 | 5 | 8 | 35 | 35 | 0 | 15 |
| 9 | TuTo Turku (Q, R) | 18 | 6 | 3 | 9 | 26 | 36 | −10 | 15 |
| 10 | KoRe Kotka (R) | 18 | 3 | 2 | 13 | 23 | 79 | −56 | 8 |

(C) Champions; (Q) Qualified for the phase indicated; (R) Relegated

== Results ==
| Home \ Away | HAK | HJK | KIF | KR | KTP | KPS | PYR | TTT | VIF | VPS |
|---|---|---|---|---|---|---|---|---|---|---|
| FC Haka | | 2–1 | 1–2 | 5–2 | 2–1 | 3–1 | 0–2 | 5–1 | 1–1 | 4–2 |
| HJK | 3–4 | | 2–2 | 2–3 | 2–2 | 2–3 | 4–0 | 4–0 | 1–1 | 1–4 |
| KIF | 2–3 | 1–1 | | 4–0 | 1–1 | 2–1 | 3–0 | 5–0 | 2–1 | 1–1 |
| KoRe | 1–7 | 0–2 | 4–3 | | 1–8 | 2–0 | 2–10 | 2–5 | 0–6 | 1–2 |
| KTP | 0–1 | 0–2 | 1–3 | 1–1 | | 2–2 | 3–0 | 4–0 | 4–2 | 0–0 |
| KuPS | 3–0 | 1–1 | 0–1 | 8–0 | 0–0 | | 6–0 | 1–1 | 1–1 | 1–1 |
| Pyrkivä | 1–0 | 3–0 | 2–2 | 1–1 | 2–2 | 1–5 | | 0–1 | 1–0 | 0–1 |
| TuTo | 2–2 | 2–1 | 0–1 | 5–1 | 0–1 | 2–3 | 1–2 | | 1–1 | 2–1 |
| VIFK | 1–1 | 5–2 | 1–1 | 8–1 | 3–1 | 2–1 | 0–2 | 1–0 | | 3–1 |
| VPS | 1–0 | 2–4 | 0–0 | 2–1 | 2–1 | 0–1 | 6–0 | 1–3 | 1–1 | |

Legend: Blue = home team win; Yellow = draw; Red = away team win.

== See also ==
- Suomen Cup 1955
