= 1954 Mestaruussarja =

Mestaruussarja
- Season: 1954
- Champions: Pyrkivä Turku
- Relegated: Jäntevä Kotka; KPT Kuopio

The 1954 season was the 24th completed season of Finnish Football League Championship, known as the Mestaruussarja.

== Overview ==
The Mestaruussarja was administered by the Finnish Football Association and the competition's 1954 season was contested by 10 teams. Pyrkivä Turku won the championship and the two lowest placed teams of the competition, Jäntevä Kotka and KPT Kuopio, were relegated to the Suomensarja.

== League standings ==
Pos	Team	Pld	W	D	L	GF	GA	GD	Pts
1	Pyrkivä Turku (C)	18	10	6	2	42	20	+22	26
2	KuPS Kuopio	18	8	6	4	38	23	+15	22
3	HJK Helsinki	18	9	4	5	31	18	+13	22
4	VIFK Vaasa	18	8	4	6	28	26	+2	20
5	TuTo Turku	18	7	4	7	35	28	+7	18
6	KTP Kotka	18	8	2	8	25	26	−1	18
7	KIF Helsinki	18	6	6	6	20	25	−5	18
8	Haka Valkeakoski	18	4	9	5	21	29	−8	17
9	Jäntevä Kotka (R)	18	3	5	10	20	41	−21	11
10	KPT Kuopio (R)	18	2	4	12	19	43	−24	8

(C) Champions; (R) Relegated

== Results ==
Home \ Away	HAK	HJK	JÄN	KIF	KPT	KTP	KPS	PYR	TTT	VIF
FC Haka		2–2	0–0	1–1	4–1	4–0	0–0	2–2	0–3	2–1
HJK	1–1		3–1	4–0	2–1	1–0	5–0	0–0	4–2	1–0
Jäntevä	3–1	0–0		0–0	3–1	1–2	0–8	4–2	0–5	1–2
KIF	0–0	1–0	1–0		4–2	3–2	1–3	0–2	0–2	2–1
KPT	0–1	3–1	2–2	2–1		0–1	2–4	2–2	1–4	1–3
KTP	3–1	1–4	1–1	0–0	2–0		4–1	0–2	2–0	2–3
KuPS	4–0	1–0	4–0	1–1	4–0	2–1		0–0	1–2	0–2
Pyrkivä	7–1	2–0	2–1	2–2	4–0	2–1	1–1		2–1	6–2
TuTo	1–1	0–1	5–3	0–2	1–1	1–2	3–3	0–3		4–1
VIFK	0–0	3–2	2–0	3–1	0–0	0–1	1–1	3–1	1–1	

Legend: Blue = home team win; Yellow = draw; Red = away team win.
