= 1957 Mestaruussarja =

Mestaruussarja
- Season: 1957
- Champions: HPS Helsinki
- Relegated: KIF Helsinki; KoRe Kotka

The 1957 season was the 27th completed season of Finnish Football League Championship, known as the Mestaruussarja.

== Overview ==
The Mestaruussarja was administered by the Finnish Football Association and the competition's 1957 season was contested by 10 teams. HPS Helsinki won the championship and qualified for the 1958–59 European Cup first round, while the two lowest placed teams of the competition, KIF Helsinki and KoRe Kotka, were relegated to the Suomensarja.

== League standings ==
Pos	Team	Pld	W	D	L	GF	GA	GD	Pts
1	HPS Helsinki (C)	18	11	4	3	49	27	+22	26
2	Haka Valkeakoski	18	11	3	4	46	20	+26	25
3	TPS Turku	18	7	7	4	45	37	+8	21
4	KuPS Kuopio	18	8	3	7	28	34	−6	19
5	IKissat Tampere	18	7	4	7	50	34	+16	18
6	HJK Helsinki	18	5	8	5	26	26	0	18
7	VPS Vaasa	18	6	4	8	21	30	−9	16
8	KTP Kotka	18	5	5	8	28	31	−3	15
9	KIF Helsinki (R)	18	5	4	9	28	36	−8	14
10	KoRe Kotka (R)	18	2	4	12	21	67	−46	8

(C) Champions; (R) Relegated

== Results ==
Home \ Away	HAK	HJK	HPS	IK	KIF	KR	KTP	KPS	TPS	VPS
FC Haka		5–2	2–3	0–3	2–0	4–0	2–1	0–0	5–2	0–1
HJK	0–0		0–0	1–2	0–0	3–0	1–0	4–2	2–2	1–2
HPS	2–2	4–2		3–2	0–3	8–2	2–1	2–1	1–1	5–3
IKissat	2–5	1–1	1–3		0–2	2–2	4–0	1–2	2–2	5–1
KIF	0–2	1–3	0–4	2–4		7–0	0–4	2–2	1–1	3–1
KoRe	1–7	1–1	2–1	1–10	1–2		1–3	1–1	1–7	2–0
KTP	0–1	2–2	0–0	2–2	3–2	3–2		1–2	2–2	2–1
KuPS	2–1	0–2	0–7	1–6	2–1	3–0	3–1		2–0	1–2
TPS	0–5	4–1	5–3	3–1	7–2	4–4	3–2	0–2		1–0
VPS	1–3	0–0	0–1	3–2	0–0	1–0	1–1	3–2	1–1	

Legend: Blue = home team win; Yellow = draw; Red = away team win.
