= 1952 Mestaruussarja =

Mestaruussarja
- Season: 1952
- Champions: KTP Kotka
- Relegated: TPK Turku; TPS Turku

The 1952 season was the 22nd completed season of Finnish Football League Championship, known as the Mestaruussarja.

== Overview ==
The Mestaruussarja was administered by the Finnish Football Association and the competition's 1952 season was contested by 10 teams. KTP Kotka won the championship and the two lowest placed teams of the competition, TPK Turku and TPS Turku, were relegated to the Suomensarja.

== League standings ==
Pos	Team	Pld	W	D	L	GF	GA	GD	Pts
1	KTP Kotka (C)	18	10	6	2	52	20	+32	26
2	VIFK Vaasa	18	10	2	6	43	22	+21	22
3	Pyrkivä Turku	18	8	5	5	41	26	+15	21
4	Jäntevä Kotka	18	6	6	6	26	24	+2	18
5	KuPS Kuopio	18	7	4	7	28	31	−3	18
6	VPS Vaasa	18	7	2	9	29	32	−3	16
7	Haka Valkeakoski	18	7	2	9	32	45	−13	16
8	KIF Helsinki	18	6	4	8	31	45	−14	16
9	TPK Turku (R)	18	5	5	8	22	39	−17	15
10	TPS Turku (R)	18	5	2	11	18	38	−20	12

(C) Champions; (R) Relegated

== Results ==
Home \ Away	HAK	JÄN	KIF	KTP	KPS	PYR	TPK	TPS	VIF	VPS
FC Haka		2–0	2–4	0–6	0–2	1–1	3–1	0–2	0–2	4–1
Jäntevä	1–1		4–1	0–0	4–1	1–2	2–2	3–1	2–0	2–0
KIF	2–8	1–0		2–4	2–2	3–4	2–2	1–1	2–1	1–0
KTP	8–0	1–1	0–1		4–0	2–2	5–0	2–1	1–1	1–4
KuPS	3–2	0–0	2–1	2–3		2–2	2–1	2–1	4–1	2–0
Pyrkivä	1–2	2–0	8–1	2–2	2–1		0–1	4–0	0–4	3–4
TPK	0–2	1–1	4–3	2–5	1–1	1–6		2–1	2–4	1–0
TPS	0–3	2–4	2–1	0–4	2–1	0–0	0–1		2–1	3–2
VIFK	7–0	5–1	0–2	1–1	2–0	0–2	2–0	4–0		4–2
VPS	4–2	2–0	1–1	1–3	3–1	1–0	0–0	3–0	1–4	

Legend: Blue = home team win; Yellow = draw; Red = away team win.
