= Finnish Cup =

Finnish football tournament

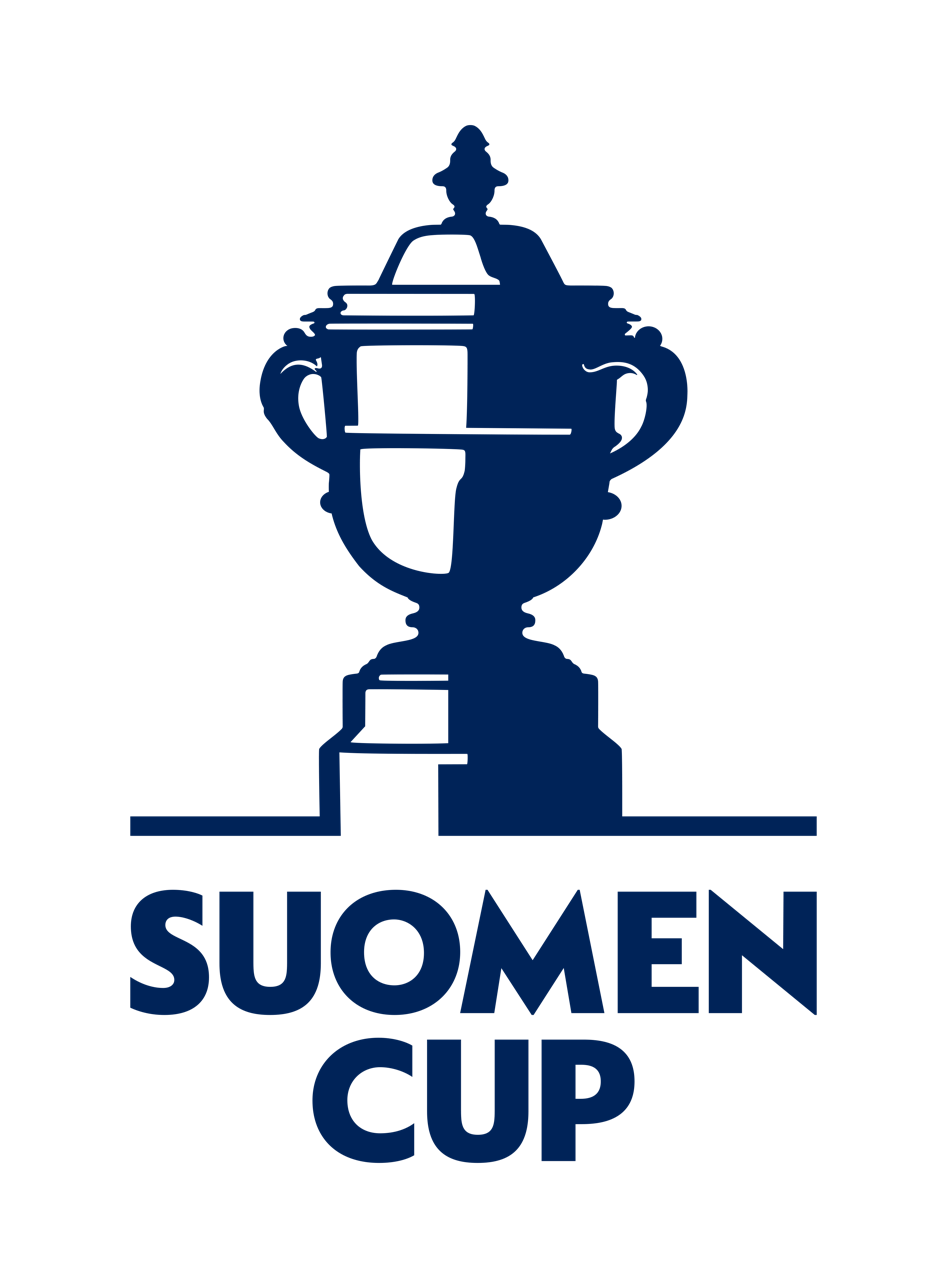
- Founded: 1955
- Region: Finland
- Teams: 364
- Qualifier for: UEFA Europa Conference League
- Current champions: FC Inter Turku (3th title)
- Most championships: HJK Helsinki (15 titles)
- Broadcaster: Ruutu+
- 2026 Finnish Cup

The Finnish Cup (Finnish: Suomen cup; Swedish: Finlands cup) is Finland's main national cup competition in football. This yearly competition is open for all member clubs of the FA of Finland and has been played since 1955.

The winner qualifies for the UEFA Europa Conference League.

== Finals ==
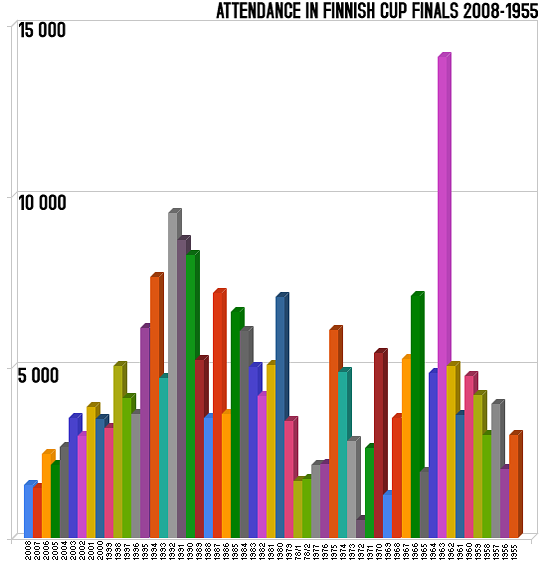
Final attendances between 1955 and 2008

The performance of various clubs is shown in the following table:

Season	Date	Winner	Runner-up	Score	Venue	City	Att.
1955	20 November 1955	Haka	HPS	5–1	Olympic Stadium	Helsinki	3,021
1956	28 October 1956	Pallo-Pojat	TKT	2–1	Olympic Stadium	Helsinki	2,020
1957	27 October 1957	IF Drott	KPT	2–1 (aet)	Olympic Stadium	Helsinki	3,907
1958	3 September 1958	KTP	KIF	4–1	Olympic Stadium	Helsinki	3,005
1959	1 November 1959	Haka	HIFK	2–1	Olympic Stadium	Helsinki	4,176
1960	23 October 1960	Haka	RU-38	3–1 (aet)	Olympic Stadium	Helsinki	4,729
1961	22 October 1961	KTP	Pallo-Pojat	5–2	Olympic Stadium	Helsinki	3,601
1962	21 October 1962	HPS	RoPS	5–0	Olympic Stadium	Helsinki	5,022
1963	20 October 1963	Haka	Reipas Lahti	1–0	Olympic Stadium	Helsinki	14,052
1964	18 October 1964	Reipas Lahti	LaPa	1–0	Olympic Stadium	Helsinki	4,837
1965	20 October 1965	Åbo IFK	TPS	1–0	Olympic Stadium	Helsinki	1,936
1966	30 October 1966	HJK	KTP	6–1	Olympic Stadium	Helsinki	7,069
1967	11 October 1967	KTP	Reipas Lahti	2–0	Olympic Stadium	Helsinki	5,243
1968	12 October 1968	KuPS	KTP	2–1	Olympic Stadium	Helsinki	3,521
1969	8 October 1969	Haka	Honka	2–0	Olympic Stadium	Helsinki	1,250
1970	4 October 1970	MP	Reipas Lahti	4–1 (aet)	Olympic Stadium	Helsinki	5,399
1971	10 October 1971	MP	Sport	4–1	Olympic Stadium	Helsinki	2,645
1972	15 October 1972	Reipas Lahti	VPS	2–0	Olympic Stadium	Helsinki	528
1973	7 October 1973	Reipas Lahti	SePS	1–0	Olympic Stadium	Helsinki	2,846
1974	6 October 1974	Reipas Lahti	OTP	1–0	Olympic Stadium	Helsinki	4,866
1975	25 April 1976	Reipas Lahti	HJK	6–2 (aet)	Olympic Stadium	Helsinki	6,086
1976	17 April 1977	Reipas Lahti	Ilves	2–0	Tammela Stadion	Tampere	2,175
1977	23 October 1977	Haka	SePS	3–1	Olympic Stadium	Helsinki	2,134
1978	8 October 1978; 15 October 1978	Reipas Lahti	KPT	3–1; 1–1	Väinölänniemi; Radiomäki	Kuopio; Lahti	1,664; 1,731
1979	21 October 1979	Ilves	TPS	2–0	Olympic Stadium	Helsinki	3,409
1980	19 October 1980	KTP	Haka	3–2	Olympic Stadium	Helsinki	7,039
1981	17 October 1981	HJK	Kuusysi	4–0	Töölön Pallokenttä	Helsinki	5,063
1982	16 October 1982	Haka	KPV	3–2	Olympic Stadium	Helsinki	4,161
1983	15 October 1983	Kuusysi	Haka	2–0	Olympic Stadium	Helsinki	5,008
1984	20 October 1984	HJK	Kuusysi	2–1	Olympic Stadium	Helsinki	6,057
1985	19 October 1985	Haka	HJK	2–2 (aet) 2–1 (p)	Olympic Stadium	Helsinki	6,622
1986	11 October 1986	RoPS	KePS	2–0	Olympic Stadium	Helsinki	3,636
1987	17 October 1987	Kuusysi	OTP	5–4	Olympic Stadium	Helsinki	7,176
1988	15 October 1988	Haka	OTP	1–0	Olympic Stadium	Helsinki	3,504
1989	14 October 1989	KuPS	Haka	3–2	Olympic Stadium	Helsinki	5,203
1990	13 October 1990	FC Ilves	HJK	2–1	Olympic Stadium	Helsinki	8,285
1991	24 October 1991	TPS	Kuusysi	0–0 (aet) 5–3 (p)	Olympic Stadium	Helsinki	8,727
1992	9 July 1992	MyPa	FF Jaro	2–0	Olympic Stadium	Helsinki	9,517
1993	17 July 1993	HJK	RoPS	2–0	Pori Stadium	Pori	4,680
1994	10 July 1994	TPS	HJK	2–1	Olympic Stadium	Helsinki	7,617
1995	28 October 1995	MyPa	FC Jazz	1–0	Olympic Stadium	Helsinki	6,140
1996	3 November 1996	HJK	TPS	0–0 (aet) 4–3 (p)	Olympic Stadium	Helsinki	3,632
1997	25 October 1997	Haka	TPS	2–1 (aet)	Olympic Stadium	Helsinki	4,107
1998	31 October 1998	HJK	PK-35	3–2	Olympic Stadium	Helsinki	5,023
1999	30 October 1999	FC Jokerit	FF Jaro	2–1	Olympic Stadium	Helsinki	3,217
2000	10 November 2000	HJK	Kotkan TP	1–0	Finnair Stadium	Helsinki	3,471
2001	12 November 2001	Atlantis	Tampere United	1–0	Tammela Stadion	Tampere	3,820
2002	9 November 2002	Haka	Lahti	4–1	Finnair Stadium	Helsinki	2,984
2003	1 November 2003	HJK	Allianssi	2–1 (aet)	Finnair Stadium	Helsinki	3,520
2004	30 October 2004	MyPa	Hämeenlinna	2–1	Finnair Stadium	Helsinki	2,650
2005	29 October 2005	Haka	TPS	4–1	Finnair Stadium	Helsinki	2,130
2006	4 November 2006	HJK	KPV	1–0	Finnair Stadium	Helsinki	2,447
2007	11 November 2007	Tampere United	Honka	3–3 (aet) 3–1 (p)	Finnair Stadium	Helsinki	1,457
2008	1 November 2008	HJK	Honka	2–1 (aet)	Finnair Stadium	Helsinki	1,554
2009	31 October 2009	Inter Turku	Tampere United	2–1	Finnair Stadium	Helsinki	2,065
2010	25 September 2010	TPS	HJK	2–0	Sonera Stadium	Helsinki	5,137
2011	24 September 2011	HJK	KuPS	2–1 (aet)	Sonera Stadium	Helsinki	5,125
2012	29 September 2012	Honka	KuPS	1–0	Sonera Stadium	Helsinki	2,340
2013	28 September 2013	RoPS	KuPS	2–1	Sonera Stadium	Helsinki	4,032
2014	1 November 2014	HJK	Inter Turku	0–0 (aet) 5–3 (p)	Sonera Stadium	Helsinki	2,349
2015	26 September 2015	IFK Mariehamn	Inter Turku	2–1	Tehtaan kenttä	Valkeakoski	3,017
2016	24 September 2016	SJK	HJK	1–1 (aet) 7–6 (p)	Ratina Stadium	Tampere	2,000
2016–17	23 September 2017	HJK	SJK	1–0	OmaSP Stadion	Seinäjoki	3,617
2017–18	12 May 2018	Inter Turku	HJK	1–0	Telia 5G Areena	Helsinki	3,540
2019	15 June 2019	Ilves	IFK Mariehamn	2–0	Wiklof Holding Arena	Mariehamn	3,250
2020	3 October 2020	HJK Helsinki	Inter Turku	2–0	Veritas Stadion	Turku	2,500
2021	8 May 2021	KuPS	HJK	0–0 (aet) 5–4 (p)	Olympic Stadium	Helsinki	0
2022	17 September 2022	KuPS	Inter Turku	1–0	Olympic Stadium	Helsinki	3,372
2023	30 September 2023	Ilves	Honka	2–1	Olympic Stadium	Helsinki	4,431
2024	21 September 2024	KuPS	Inter Turku	2–1 (aet)	Tammelan Stadion	Tampere	5,745
2025	20 September 2025	HJK	KuPS	1–0	Tammelan Stadion	Tampere	5,355
2026	5 September 2026	Inter Turku	HJK	1–0	Tammelan Stadion	Tampere	4,791

== Performance by club ==
The performance of various clubs is shown in the following table:

Club	Winners	Runners-up	Winning years
HJK	15	9	1966, 1981, 1984, 1993, 1996, 1998, 2000, 2003, 2006, 2008, 2011, 2014, 2016–17, 2020, 2025
FC Haka	12	3	1955, 1959, 1960, 1963, 1969, 1977, 1982, 1985, 1988, 1997, 2002, 2005
Reipas Lahti	7	3	1964, 1972, 1973, 1974, 1975, 1976, 1978
KuPS	5	4	1968, 1989, 2021, 2022, 2024
KTP	4	3	1958, 1961, 1967, 1980
Ilves	4	1	1979, 1990, 2019, 2023
TPS	3	5	1991, 1994, 2010
Inter Turku	3	5	2009, 2017–18, 2026
MyPa	3	–	1992, 1995, 2004
Kuusysi	2	3	1983, 1987
RoPS	2	2	1986, 2013
MP	2	–	1970, 1971
FC Honka	1	3	2012
TamU	1	2	2007
Pallo-Pojat	1	1	1956
HPS	1	1	1962
IFK Mariehamn	1	1	2015
Seinäjoen Jalkapallokerho	1	1	2016
IF Drott	1	–	1957
ÅIFK	1	–	1965
FC Jokerit	1	–	1999
Atlantis	1	–	2001

Performance by region

Region	Clubs	Winners	Winning years
Uusimaa	HJK, Pallo-Pojat, HPS, FC Jokerit, Atlantis FC, FC Honka	19	1956, 1962, 1966, 1981, 1984, 1993, 1996, 1998, 1999, 2000, 2001, 2003, 2006, 2008, 2011, 2012, 2014, 2016–17, 2025
Pirkanmaa	Haka, Ilves, Tampere United	15	1955, 1959, 1960, 1963, 1969, 1977, 1979, 1982, 1985, 1988, 1990, 1997, 2002, 2005, 2007
Päijät-Häme	Reipas, Kuusysi	9	1964, 1972, 1973, 1974, 1975, 1976, 1978, 1983, 1987
Kymenlaakso	KTP, MyPa	7	1958, 1961, 1967, 1980, 1992, 1995, 2004
Varsinais-Suomi	TPS, FC Inter, ÅIFK	7	1965, 1991, 1994, 2009, 2010, 2018, 2026
Pohjois-Savo	KuPS	3	1968, 1989, 2021
Etelä-Savo	MP	2	1970, 1971
Lappi	RoPS	2	1986, 2013
Pohjanmaa	IF Drott	1	1957
Etelä-Pohjanmaa	SJK	1	2016
Åland	MIFK	1	2015

== See also ==
- Finnish League Cup
