= Andrzej Możejko =

Polish footballer (1949–2021)

Personal information
- Full name: Andrzej Aleksander Możejko
- Date of birth: 22 April 1949
- Place of birth: Słupsk, Poland
- Date of death: 1 May 2021 (aged 72)
- Place of death: Łódź, Poland
- Height: 1.75 m (5 ft 9 in)
- Position: Defender

Youth career
- ŁKS Łódź

Senior career*
Years	Team	Apps	(Gls)
- Flota Gdynia
1975–1982	Widzew Łódź	264 (Note: Does not include III liga appearances and goals.)	(6)
1982–1983	Kokkolan Palloveikot	28 (Note: Does not include appearances and goals in the 1983 season.)	(1)
1984–1985	Rauman Pallo		
1985–1986	Start Łódź		
1986–1987	Kolejarz Łódź		
- * Club domestic league appearances and goals

Andrzej Aleksander Możejko (22 April 1949 – 1 May 2021) was a Polish professional footballer who played as a defender. He won two league championships with Widzew Łódź and also played for Kokkolan Palloveikot and Rauman Pallo in Finland.

== Honours ==
Widzew Łódź

- Ekstraklasa: 1980–81, 1981–82
