= Abaas Ismail =

Finnish footballer (born 1998)

Personal information
- Date of birth: 19 May 1998 (age 28)
- Position: Striker

Team information
- Current team: Kiffen

Senior career*
Years	Team	Apps	(Gls)
2016	PK-35 Vantaa	6	(0)
2017	HIFK	0	(0)
2017	→ Kiffen (loan)	5	(0)
2018	Klubi 04	1	(0)
2018–	Kiffen	3	(1)

International career
- Finland U18
- * Club domestic league appearances and goals as of 12:18, 10 August 2018 (UTC)

Abaas Ismail (born 19 May 1998) is a Finnish professional footballer who plays for Kiffen as a striker.

== Club career ==
Ismail has played for PK-35 Vantaa, HIFK, Kiffen and Klubi 04.

He signed a two-year contract with HIFK in January 2017. He left the club in January 2018.

== International career ==
He has represented Finland at under-18 youth level.
