= 1956 Mestaruussarja =

Mestaruussarja
- Season: 1956
- Champions: KuPS Kuopio
- Relegated: VIFK Vaasa; Pyrkivä Turku

The 1956 season was the 26th completed season of Finnish Football League Championship, known as the Mestaruussarja.

== Overview ==
The Mestaruussarja was administered by the Finnish Football Association and the competition's 1956 season was contested by 10 teams. KuPS Kuopio won the championship and the two lowest placed teams of the competition, VIFK Vaasa and Pyrkivä Turku, were relegated to the Suomensarja.

== League standings ==
Pos	Team	Pld	W	D	L	GF	GA	GD	Pts
1	KuPS Kuopio (C)	18	11	5	2	31	12	+19	27
2	HJK Helsinki	18	9	3	6	39	28	+11	21
3	KIF Helsinki	18	7	6	5	32	18	+14	20
4	IKissat Tampere	18	9	2	7	33	36	−3	20
5	Haka Valkeakoski	18	6	5	7	18	18	0	17
6	VPS Vaasa	18	7	3	8	29	30	−1	17
7	KTP Kotka	18	7	3	8	28	29	−1	17
8	HPS Helsinki	18	7	2	9	28	34	−6	16
9	VIFK Vaasa (R)	18	6	1	11	25	32	−7	13
10	Pyrkivä Turku (R)	18	6	0	12	20	46	−26	12

(C) Champions; (R) Relegated

== Results ==
Home \ Away	HAK	HJK	HPS	IK	KIF	KTP	KPS	PYR	VIF	VPS
FC Haka		0–2	0–1	3–1	2–1	1–2	0–0	4–1	0–1	3–1
HJK	0–0		0–2	2–3	4–1	2–2	0–2	3–1	1–0	2–1
HPS	1–1	2–4		1–0	3–2	0–4	0–2	0–1	2–1	2–3
IKissat	1–2	4–3	5–3		0–0	2–0	1–0	3–1	3–2	1–1
KIF	0–0	0–0	3–1	6–3		1–1	0–0	4–0	3–0	7–1
KTP	0–0	1–2	1–2	3–1	1–0		1–2	3–0	1–0	1–3
KuPS	3–0	2–3	1–1	4–0	0–0	3–0		2–1	2–1	3–2
Pyrkivä	2–1	0–6	1–6	0–1	0–2	4–3	1–2		1–3	1–0
VIFK	1–0	4–3	4–1	0–4	1–2	2–3	0–2	2–3		1–1
VPS	1–0	3–2	1–0	5–0	1–0	4–1	1–1	1–2	0–2	

Legend: Blue = home team win; Yellow = draw; Red = away team win.

== See also ==
- Suomen Cup 1956
