= Svenska Fotbollpokalen 1903 II =

Svenska Fotbollpokalen 1903 II, part of the 1903 Swedish football season, was the sixth Svenska Fotbollpokalen tournament played, the tournament was a replay for the previous 1903 tournament, Svenska Fotbollpokalen 1903 I. 11 teams participated and ten matches were played, the first 9 August 1903 and the last 20 September 1903. Örgryte IS won the tournament ahead of runners-up IFK Stockholm.

== Participating clubs ==

Club	Last season	First season in tournament	First season of current spell
AIK	Semi-final	1899	1899
Djurgårdens IF	Semi-final	1899	1899
IF Drott	Did not participate	1903 II	1903 II
IFK Eskilstuna	Did not participate	1902	1903 II
Norrköpings IF	1st round	1903 I	1903 I
Norrmalms SK	Did not participate	1903 II	1903 II
IFK Stockholm	Did not participate	1903 II	1903 II
IF Swithiod	1st round	1900	1900
Örgryte IS	Winners	1903 I	1903 I
Östermalms IF	Did not participate	1902	1903 II
Östermalms SK	Did not participate	1900	1903 II

== Tournament results ==
1st round

August 9, 1903

IFK Eskilstuna	3–0	Östermalms IF

?, Eskilstuna

August 9, 1903

Djurgårdens IF	12–1	Norrköpings IF

?, Norrköping

August 9, 1903

IF Drott	6–0	Östermalms SK

?, Stockholm

August 9, 1903

IFK Stockholm	2–0	AIK

?, Stockholm

August 9, 1903

IF Swithiod	2–0	Norrmalms SK

?, Stockholm

2nd round

August 16, 1903

IFK Eskilstuna	2–1	IF Swithiod

?, Eskilstuna

August 23, 1903

IFK Stockholm	3–0	IF Drott

?, Stockholm

3rd round

September 1, 1903

IFK Stockholm	3–1	Djurgårdens IF

?, Stockholm

Semi-final

September 6, 1903

IFK Stockholm	4–2	IFK Eskilstuna

?, Stockholm

Final

September 20, 1903

Örgryte IS	2–1	IFK Stockholm

Idrottsparken, Stockholm
