= Svenska Fotbollpokalen 1903 I =

Svenska Fotbollpokalen 1903 I, part of the 1903 Swedish football season, was the fifth Svenska Fotbollpokalen tournament played, but the tournament for 1903 was replayed later in the year as Svenska Fotbollpokalen 1903 II. Seven teams participated and six matches were played, the first on 28 May 1903 and the last on 6 June 1903. Örgryte IS won the tournament, even though losing the final against Boldklubben af 1893 from Denmark that only participated as a demonstration team, and no runners-up were declared.

== Participating clubs ==

Club	Last season	First season in tournament	First season of current spell
AIK	Quarter-final	1899	1899
Boldklubben af 1893, Denmark	Did not participate	1903 I	1903 I
Djurgårdens IF	Runners-up	1899	1899
Göteborgs IF	Quarter-final	1902	1902
Norrköpings IF	Did not participate	1903 I	1903 I
IF Swithiod	Semi-final	1900	1900
Örgryte IS	Did not participate	1903 I	1903 I

== Tournament results ==
1st round

28 May 1903

Djurgårdens IF	5–1	Göteborgs IF

?, Stockholm

29 May 1903

AIK	3–2	Norrköpings IF

?, Stockholm

30 May 1903

Boldklubben af 1893	7–1	IF Swithiod

?, Stockholm

Semi-finals

31 May 1903

Boldklubben af 1893	7–0	Djurgårdens IF

?, Stockholm

31 May 1903

Örgryte IS	4–0	AIK

?, Stockholm

Final

1 June 1903

Boldklubben af 1893	6–0	Örgryte IS

?, Stockholm
