= 1938–39 SM-sarja season =

Finnish ice hockey season

The 1938–1939 SM-Sarja season was played 7 teams from 4 cities making it the largest competition yet. Each team played 6 games each.

== SM-Sarja Championship ==
SM-sarja	GP	W	T	L	Pts	GF	GA
KIF Helsinki	6	6	0	0	12	23	9
HJK Helsinki	6	4	1	1	9	14	9
Ilves Tampere	6	4	0	2	8	14	7
Tarmo Hämeenlinna	6	2	0	4	4	12	18
Riento Turku	6	2	0	4	4	5	12
ÅIFK Turku	6	1	1	4	3	8	12
HSK Helsinki	6	1	0	5	2	7	16

KIF wins the 1938–1939 SM-sarja championship

Preceded by 1937–38 SM-sarja season	SM-sarja season 1938–39	Succeeded by 1939–40 SM-sarja season
