= Metsola =

Metsola is a Finnish surname. Notable people with the surname include:

- Ilari Metsola (born 1992), Finnish ice hockey player
- Juha Metsola (born 1989), Finnish ice hockey player
- Jukka-Pekka Metsola (born 1954), Finnish judoka
- Roberta Metsola (born 1979), Maltese politician, President of the European Parliament

== See also ==
- Metsola, Vantaa, a district of the city of Vantaa, Finland
