= Randell Harrevelt =

Aruban footballer (born 1993)

Personal information
- Full name: Randell Jenoraldo Cecil Harrevelt
- Date of birth: 8 January 1993 (age 33)
- Place of birth: Amsterdam, Netherlands
- Height: 1.81 m (5 ft 11 in)
- Position: Forward

Youth career
- AFC
- Zeeburgia
- Volendam
- Nottingham Forest
- VVV/Helmond Sport

Senior career*
Years	Team	Apps	(Gls)
2012	Excelsior Veldwezelt		
2015	BÍ/Bolungarvík	0	(0)
2016	Pietà Hotspurs	8	(1)
2016–2017	Dumlupınar Üniversitesi		
2018	Sollentuna	1	(0)
2019	Anduud City		
2019	Știința Miroslava		
2020	Pallo-Iirot	8	(0)
2021	Fagersta Södra	1	(0)
2024	ASD San Marco		
2024–2025	Zwaluwen '30		

International career
2019	Aruba	3	(0)
- * Club domestic league appearances and goals

Randell Jenoraldo Cecil Harrevelt (born 8 January 1993) is an Aruban footballer who most recently played as a forward for Dutch club Zwaluwen '30 in Hoorn. He made three senior appearances for the Aruba national team in 2019.

== Club career ==
Born in Amsterdam, Harrevelt came through the youth systems of AFC, Zeeburgia, Volendam, Nottingham Forest and VVV-Venlo/Helmond Sport.

He moved to Belgian side Excelsior Veldwezelt in 2012, leaving when the club declared bankruptcy that December. After a short spell without a club, he joined Icelandic second-tier side BÍ/Bolungarvík in 2015, and signed for Pietà Hotspurs of Malta in January 2016, scoring on 25 minutes in a 3–2 FA Trophy quarter-final win over St. George's.

He later had stints with Dumlupınar Üniversitesi in Northern Cyprus (2016–17) and with Sollentuna in Sweden's Division 1 in 2018, before joining Anduud City in the Mongolian Premier League in 2019, scoring in several league fixtures that season. In August 2019 he signed for Romanian third-tier club Știința Miroslava, and in March 2020 moved to Finnish side Pallo-Iirot in the Kakkonen. He joined Swedish club Fagersta Södra in August 2021, and returned to the Netherlands in 2024 with amateur side Zwaluwen '30 after a spell in Italy with San Marco.

== International career ==
When Harrevelt played in Mongolia, he was contacted by Aruba national football team manager Martin Koopman and later made three senior appearances for them in the 2019–20 CONCACAF Nations League group stage, debuting against Guyana on 6 September 2019.

== Personal life ==
Following Excelsior Veldwezelt's bankruptcy, Harrevelt undertook modelling work, and has spoken about trials and short-term moves early in his career, including a brief trial at Club Africain in Tunisia.
