= Juha Dahllund =

Finnish footballer (1954–2025)

Personal information
- Date of birth: 20 March 1954
- Place of birth: Helsinki, Finland
- Date of death: September 14, 2025 (aged 71)
- Position: Midfielder

Senior career*
Years	Team	Apps	(Gls)
1972-1976	HJK	65	(3)
1977	Kiffen	21	(4)
1978-1985	HJK	172	(15)
1986-1992	Vantaan Pallo-70		(5)
1999	Vantaan Jalkapalloseura	1	(0)

International career
	Finland	16	(0)
- * Club domestic league appearances and goals

Juha Dahllund (20 March 1954 – 14 September 2025) was a Finnish footballer. He competed in the men's tournament at the 1980 Summer Olympics. Most of his career he played for Helsingin Jalkapalloklubi.
