= 1939–40 SM-sarja season =

Finnish ice hockey season

The 1939-1940 SM-sarja season did not take place because of the Winter War, which made playing ice hockey impossible.

Preceded by 1938–39 SM-sarja season	SM-sarja season 1939–40	Succeeded by 1940–41 SM-sarja season
