= Target Ayannubi =

Nigerian footballer (born 2006)

Personal information
- Date of birth: 10 October 2006 (age 20)
- Place of birth: Nigeria
- Position: Midfielder

Team information
- Current team: Pallo-Iirot

Youth career
- 2023: Pallo-Iirot
- 2024: St. Pauli
- 2024–2025: VMC
- 2025: Vora

Senior career*
Years	Team	Apps	(Gls)
2025–2026	Gramshi	0	(0)
2026–	Pallo-Iirot	0	(0)
- * Club domestic league appearances and goals as of 8 March 2026

Target Ayannubi (born 10 October 2006) is a Nigerian football player who plays as a midfielder for Kakkonen club Pallo-Iirot.

== Early life ==
Ayannubi grew up in Nigeria playing football. During the 2021–2022 season, he played for Madiba FC in Nigerian third-tier level. In the late 2022, he travelled to Finland to visit his relatives, but he ended up signing a contract with the first team of a local Rauma-based club Pallo-Iirot, competing in Finnish third-tier Kakkonen.

== Club career ==
In the 2023 season, Ayannubi made 18 appearances and scored once for Pallo-Iirot in Kakkonen. In addition, he played 24 games and scored 15 goals for the club's U17 team in U17-league.

In early March 2024, Ayannubi signed with German FC St. Pauli organisation and joined their U19 academy team.
