= Jäntevä Kotka =

Finnish sports club

Kotkan Jäntevä
- Full name: Kotkan Jäntevä
- Founded: 1940
- Manager: Saarelainen Akseli, Höglund Joona
- League: Vitonen
Home colours	Away colours

Kotkan Jäntevä is a Finnish football club from the city of Kotka.

Club was founded as a general sports club in 1940 but nowadays focuses only on football. Jäntevä was founded in Metsola district, a continental part of Kotka. Club has a number of youth teams for both boys and girls and for senior players. Club has played a total of 4 seasons in Finnish premier division Mestaruussarja. In the end of 1953 season they were tied in points with VIFK, championship was decided on rematch in neutral ground in Turku, Jäntevä led the match at half time and controversially was denied a penalty while leading the match, but ended up losing 1–3.

== Season to season ==
Season to Season
Season	Level	Division	Section	Administration	Position	Movements
1945-46	Tier 3	Maakuntasarja (Third Division)	Kymenlaakso South	Finnish FA (Suomen Pallolitto)	1st	Promotion Playoff - Promoted
1946-47	Tier 2	Suomensarja (Second Division)	South Group	Finnish FA (Suomen Palloliitto)	2nd	Promotion Group 1st - Promoted
1947-48	Tier 1	Mestaruussarja (Premier Division)		Finnish FA (Suomen Palloliitto)	8th	Relegated
1948	Tier 2	Suomensarja (Second Division)	South Group	Finnish FA (Suomen Palloliitto)	5th	
1949	Tier 2	Suomensarja (Second Division)	East Group	Finnish FA (Suomen Palloliitto)	5th	
1950	Tier 2	Suomensarja (Second Division)	East Group	Finnish FA (Suomen Palloliitto)	5th	
1951	Tier 2	Suomensarja (Second Division)	East Group	Finnish FA (Suomen Palloliitto)	1st	Promoted
1952	Tier 1	Mestaruussarja (Premier Division)		Finnish FA (Suomen Palloliitto)	4th	
1953	Tier 1	Mestaruussarja (Premier Division)		Finnish FA (Suomen Palloliitto)	2nd	Rematch for championship
1954	Tier 1	Mestaruussarja (Premier Division)		Finnish FA (Suomen Palloliitto)	9th	Relegated
1955	Tier 2	Suomensarja (Second Division)	East Group	Finnish FA (Suomen Palloliitto)	4th	
1956	Tier 2	Suomensarja (Second Division)	East Group	Finnish FA (Suomen Palloliitto)	4th	
1957	Tier 2	Suomensarja (Second Division)	East Group	Finnish FA (Suomen Palloliitto)	10th	Relegated
1958	Tier 3	Maakuntasarja (Third Division)	Group 2	Finnish FA (Suomen Pallolitto)	2nd	
1959	Tier 3	Maakuntasarja (Third Division)	Group 4	Finnish FA (Suomen Pallolitto)	2nd	
1960	Tier 3	Maakuntasarja (Third Division)	Group 2	Finnish FA (Suomen Pallolitto)	1st	Promoted
1961	Tier 2	Suomensarja (Second Division)	East Group	Finnish FA (Suomen Palloliitto)	6th	
1962	Tier 2	Suomensarja (Second Division)	East Group	Finnish FA (Suomen Palloliitto)	10th	Relegated
1963	Tier 3	Maakuntasarja (Third Division)	Group 5	Finnish FA (Suomen Pallolitto)	1st	Promoted
1964	Tier 2	Suomensarja (Second Division)	East Group	Finnish FA (Suomen Palloliitto)	8th	
1965	Tier 2	Suomensarja (Second Division)	East Group	Finnish FA (Suomen Palloliitto)	6th	
1966	Tier 2	Suomensarja (Second Division)	East Group	Finnish FA (Suomen Palloliitto)	12th	Relegated
1967	Tier 3	Maakuntasarja (Third Division)	Group 6	Finnish FA (Suomen Pallolitto)	1st	Promoted
1968	Tier 2	Suomensarja (Second Division)	East Group	Finnish FA (Suomen Palloliitto)	4th	
1969	Tier 2	Suomensarja (Second Division)	East Group	Finnish FA (Suomen Palloliitto)	8th	
1970	Tier 2	II Divisioona (Second Division)	East Group	Finnish FA (Suomen Palloliitto)	12th	Relegated
1971	Tier 3	III Divisioona (Third Division)	Group 4	Finnish FA (Suomen Pallolitto)	3rd	
1972	Tier 3	III Divisioona (Third Division)	Group 6	Finnish FA (Suomen Pallolitto)	7th	
1973	Tier 4	III Divisioona (Third Division)	Group 6	Finnish FA (Suomen Pallolitto)	7th	
1974	Tier 4	III Divisioona (Third Division)	Group 6	Finnish FA (Suomen Pallolitto)	1st	Promoted
1975	Tier 3	II Divisioona (Second Division)	East Group	Finnish FA (Suomen Pallolitto)	8th	
1976	Tier 3	II Divisioona (Second Division)	East Group	Finnish FA (Suomen Pallolitto)	6th	
1977	Tier 3	II Divisioona (Second Division)	East Group	Finnish FA (Suomen Pallolitto)	12th	Relegated
1978	Tier 4	III Divisioona (Third Division)	Group 6	Finnish FA (Suomen Pallolitto)	2nd	
1979	Tier 4	III Divisioona (Third Division)	Group 6	Finnish FA (Suomen Pallolitto)	2nd	Promotion Playoff - Promoted
1980	Tier 3	II Divisioona (Second Division)	East Group	Finnish FA (Suomen Pallolitto)	9th	
1981	Tier 3	II Divisioona (Second Division)	East Group	Finnish FA (Suomen Pallolitto)	10th	Relegated
1982	Tier 4	III Divisioona (Third Division)	Group 6	Finnish FA (Suomen Pallolitto)	12th	Relegated
1983	Tier 5	IV Divisioona (Fourth Division)	Group 10	Finnish FA (Suomen Pallolitto)	8th	
1984	Tier 5	IV Divisioona (Fourth Division)	Group 10	Finnish FA (Suomen Pallolitto)	8th	
1985	Tier 5	IV Divisioona (Fourth Division)	Group 10	Finnish FA (Suomen Pallolitto)	6th	
1986	Tier 5	IV Divisioona (Fourth Division)	Group 10	Finnish FA (Suomen Pallolitto)	4th	
1987-94	Unknown					
1995	Tier 7	Kutonen (Sixth Division)		South-East District (SPL Kaakkois-Suomi)	7th	
1996-97	Unknown					
1998	Tier 5	Nelonen (Fourth Division)	West Group	South-East District (SPL Kaakkois-Suomi)	8th	
1999						
2000	Tier 5	Nelonen (Fourth Division)	Relegation Group	South-East District (SPL Kaakkois-Suomi)	5th	
2001	Tier 5	Nelonen (Fourth Division)	South Group	South-East District (SPL Kaakkois-Suomi)	6th	Relegation Group 9th - Relegated
2002	Tier 6	Vitonen (Fifth Division)	South Group	South-East District (SPL Kaakkois-Suomi)	3rd	
2003	Tier 6	Vitonen (Fifth Division)	South Group	South-East District (SPL Kaakkois-Suomi)	3rd	
2004	Tier 6	Vitonen (Fifth Division)	South Group	South-East District (SPL Kaakkois-Suomi)	4th	
2005	Tier 6	Vitonen (Fifth Division)	South Group	South-East District (SPL Kaakkois-Suomi)	4th	
2006	Tier 6	Vitonen (Fifth Division)	South Group	South-East District (SPL Kaakkois-Suomi)	4th	
2007	Tier 6	Vitonen (Fifth Division)	South Group	South-East District (SPL Kaakkois-Suomi)	3rd	Promotion Group West 6th
2008	Tier 6	Vitonen (Fifth Division)	West Group	South-East District (SPL Kaakkois-Suomi)	4th	
2009	Tier 6	Vitonen (Fifth Division)	South Group	South-East District (SPL Kaakkois-Suomi)	5th	
2010	Tier 6	Vitonen (Fifth Division)	South Group	South-East District (SPL Kaakkois-Suomi)	7th	
2011	Tier 4	Kolmonen (Third Division)		South-East District (SPL Kaakkois-Suomi)	7th	
2012	Tier 4	Kolmonen (Third Division)		South-East District (SPL Kaakkois-Suomi)	10th	
2013	Tier 4	Kolmonen (Third Division)		South-East District (SPL Kaakkois-Suomi)	11th	
2014	Tier 6	Vitonen (Fifth Division)	West Group	South-East District (SPL Kaakkois-Suomi)	9th	Withdrew from Kolmonen
2015	Tier 6	Vitonen (Fifth Division)	West Group	South-East District (SPL Kaakkois-Suomi)	3rd	
2016	Tier 6	Vitonen (Fifth Division)	West Group	South-East District (SPL Kaakkois-Suomi)	7th	
2017	Tier 6	Vitonen (Fifth Division)	West Group	South-East District (SPL Kaakkois-Suomi)	10th	Relegated
2018	Tier 7	Kutonen (Sixth Division)	South Group	South-East District (SPL Kaakkois-Suomi)	4th	
2019	Tier 7	Kutonen (Sixth Division)	South Group	South-East District (SPL Kaakkois-Suomi)	2nd	Promoted

- 4 seasons in Mestaruussarja
- 16 seasons in Suomensarja
- 13 seasons in II Divisioona
- 8 seasons in Kolmonen
- 7 seasons in Nelonen
- 13 seasons in Vitonen
- 2 season in Kutonen

== Official homepage ==
- (in Finnish)
