= Ilari Metsola =

Finnish ice hockey player

- Born: August 16, 1992 (age 32); Helsinki, Finland
- Height: 6 ft 0 in (183 cm)
- Weight: 176 lb (80 kg; 12 st 8 lb)
- Position: Defence
- Shoots: Left
- Mestis team Former teams: Peliitat Heinola; HIFK; Lahti Pelicans
- NHL draft: Undrafted
- Playing career: 2013–present

Ilari Metsola (born August 16, 1992) is a Finnish ice hockey defenceman. He is currently playing with Peliitat Heinola in the Finnish Mestis.

Metsola made his Liiga debut playing with HIFK during the 2012–13 Liiga season.
