= Tampereen Kisatoverit =

- Full name: Tampereen Kisatoverit ry
- Short name: TKT Tampere
- Founded: 21 March 1920; 105 years ago
- Chairman: Erkka Ikonen
- League: Kutonen
- 2025: Kutonen B4, 10th of 10
- Website: tampereenkisatoverit.fi
Home colours	Away colours

Tampereen Kisatoverit (TKT) is a Finnish multi-sport club from Tampere. The club has activity in football, gymnastics, arm wrestling and volleyball.

== Background ==
Tampereen Kisatoverit was founded by workers of Tampella. It had a strong working class identity since the beginning and is a member of Finnish Workers' Sports Federation.

== Football ==
Football was one of the main sports early on, and is still strongest sport of the club. Back in 1960 TKT played one season in finnish top tier Mestaruussarja. The club operates in southeast Tampere and operates a training center in Aitolahti, north of Tampere.

== Season to season ==
Season to Season
Season	Level	Division	Section	Administration	Position	Movements
1948	Tier 2	Suomensarja (Second Division)	North Group	Finnish FA (Suomen Pallolitto)	8th	
1949	Tier 2	Suomensarja (Second Division)	North Group	Finnish FA (Suomen Pallolitto)	9th	Relegated
1950	Tier 3	Suomensarja Qualifying (Third Division)	West Group	Finnish FA (Suomen Pallolitto)	1st	Promoted
1951	Tier 2	Suomensarja (Second Division)	West Group	Finnish FA (Suomen Pallolitto)	2nd	
1952	Tier 2	Suomensarja (Second Division)	West Group	Finnish FA (Suomen Pallolitto)	3rd	
1953	Tier 2	Suomensarja (Second Division)	East Group	Finnish FA (Suomen Pallolitto)	3rd	
1954	Tier 2	Suomensarja (Second Division)	West Group	Finnish FA (Suomen Pallolitto)	3rd	
1955	Tier 2	Suomensarja (Second Division)	West Group	Finnish FA (Suomen Pallolitto)	7th	
1956	Tier 2	Suomensarja (Second Division)	West Group	Finnish FA (Suomen Pallolitto)	5th	
1957	Tier 2	Suomensarja (Second Division)	East Group	Finnish FA (Suomen Pallolitto)	2nd	
1958	Tier 2	Suomensarja (Second Division)	West Group	Finnish FA (Suomen Pallolitto)	4th	
1959	Tier 2	Suomensarja (Second Division)	West Group	Finnish FA (Suomen Pallolitto)	1st	Promoted
1960	Tier 1	Mestaruussarja (Premier League)		Finnish FA (Suomen Pallolitto)	11th	Relegated
1961	Tier 2	Suomensarja (Second Division)	West Group	Finnish FA (Suomen Pallolitto)	4th	
1962	Tier 2	Suomensarja (Second Division)	West Group	Finnish FA (Suomen Pallolitto)	4th	
1963	Tier 2	Suomensarja (Second Division)	West Group	Finnish FA (Suomen Pallolitto)	8th	
1964	Tier 2	Suomensarja (Second Division)	West Group	Finnish FA (Suomen Pallolitto)	3rd	
1965	Tier 2	Suomensarja (Second Division)	West Group	Finnish FA (Suomen Pallolitto)	3rd	
1966	Tier 2	Suomensarja (Second Division)	West Group	Finnish FA (Suomen Pallolitto)	10th	Relegated
1967	Tier 3	Maakuntasarja (Third Division)	Group 5	Finnish FA (Suomen Pallolitto)	1st	Promoted
1968	Tier 2	Suomensarja (Second Division)	West Group	Finnish FA (Suomen Pallolitto)	9th	Relegated
1969	Tier 3	Maakuntasarja (Third Division)	Group 4	Finnish FA (Suomen Pallolitto)	4th	
1970	Tier 3	III Divisioona (Third Division)	Group 4	Finnish FA (Suomen Pallolitto)	2nd	
1971	Tier 3	III Divisioona (Third Division)	Group 3	Finnish FA (Suomen Pallolitto)	2nd	
1972	Tier 3	III Divisioona (Third Division)	Group 3	Finnish FA (Suomen Pallolitto)	2nd	Promoted
1973	Tier 3	II Divisioona (Second Division)	West Group	Finnish FA (Suomen Pallolitto)	8th	
1974	Tier 3	II Divisioona (Second Division)	West Group	Finnish FA (Suomen Pallolitto)	11th	Relegated
1975	Tier 4	III Divisioona (Third Division)	Group 5	Finnish FA (Suomen Pallolitto)	6th	
1976	Tier 4	III Divisioona (Third Division)	Group 4	Finnish FA (Suomen Pallolitto)	4th	
1977	Tier 4	III Divisioona (Third Division)	Group 5	Finnish FA (Suomen Pallolitto)	6th	
1978	Tier 4	III Divisioona (Third Division)	Group 5	Finnish FA (Suomen Pallolitto)	8th	
1979	Tier 4	III Divisioona (Third Division)	Group 5	Finnish FA (Suomen Pallolitto)	10th	Relegated
1980	Tier 5	IV Divisioona (Fourth Division)	Group 8	Finnish FA (Suomen Pallolitto)	4th	
1981	Tier 5	IV Divisioona (Fourth Division)	Group 7	Finnish FA (Suomen Pallolitto)	2nd	Promotion Playoff
1982	Tier 5	IV Divisioona (Fourth Division)	Group 7	Finnish FA (Suomen Pallolitto)	1st	Promotion Playoff - Promoted
1983	Tier 4	III Divisioona (Third Division)	Group 4	Finnish FA (Suomen Pallolitto)	10th	
1984	Tier 4	III Divisioona (Third Division)	Group 4	Finnish FA (Suomen Pallolitto)	7th	
1985	Tier 4	III Divisioona (Third Division)	Group 5	Finnish FA (Suomen Pallolitto)	5th	
1986	Tier 4	III Divisioona (Third Division)	Group 5	Finnish FA (Suomen Pallolitto)	6th	
1987	Tier 4	III Divisioona (Third Division)	Group 5	Finnish FA (Suomen Pallolitto)	4th	
1988	Tier 4	III Divisioona (Third Division)	Group 4	Finnish FA (Suomen Pallolitto)	5th	
1989	Tier 4	III Divisioona (Third Division)	Group 5	Finnish FA (Suomen Pallolitto)	7th	
1990	Tier 4	III Divisioona (Third Division)	Group 5	Finnish FA (Suomen Pallolitto)	4th	
1991	Tier 4	III Divisioona (Third Division)	Group 5	Finnish FA (Suomen Pallolitto)	1st	Promoted
1992	Tier 3	II Divisioona (Second Division)	West Group	Finnish FA (Suomen Pallolitto)	11th	Relegated
1993	Tier 4	Kolmonen (Third Division)	Group 5	Finnish FA (Suomen Pallolitto)	7th	
1994	Tier 4	Kolmonen (Third Division)	Group 4	Finnish FA (Suomen Pallolitto)	1st	Promoted
1995	Tier 3	Kakkonen (Second Division)	West Group	Finnish FA (Suomen Pallolitto)	5th	
1996	Tier 3	Kakkonen (Second Division)	West Group	Finnish FA (Suomen Pallolitto)	2nd	
1997	Tier 3	Kakkonen (Second Division)	West Group	Finnish FA (Suomen Pallolitto)	6th	
1998	Tier 3	Kakkonen (Second Division)	West Group	Finnish FA (Suomen Pallolitto)	7th	
1999	Tier 3	Kakkonen (Second Division)	South Group	Finnish FA (Suomen Pallolitto)	9th	
2000	Tier 3	Kakkonen (Second Division)	South Group	Finnish FA (Suomen Pallolitto)	11th	
2001	Tier 4	Kolmonen (Third Division)		Tampere District (SPL Tampere)	6th	
2002	Tier 4	Kolmonen (Third Division)		Tampere District (SPL Tampere)	2nd	
2003	Tier 4	Kolmonen (Third Division)		Tampere District (SPL Tampere)	1st	Promotion Group 1st - Promoted
2004	Tier 3	Kakkonen (Second Division)	West Group	Finnish FA (Suomen Pallolitto)	10th	Relegation Playoff
2005	Tier 3	Kakkonen (Second Division)	East Group	Finnish FA (Suomen Pallolitto)	9th	
2006	Tier 3	Kakkonen (Second Division)	Group B	Finnish FA (Suomen Pallolitto)	12th	Relegated
2007	Tier 4	Kolmonen (Third Division)		Tampere District (SPL Tampere)	12th	Relegated
2008	Tier 5	Nelonen (Fourth Division)		Tampere District (SPL Tampere)	3rd	Promotion Playoff - Promoted
2009	Tier 4	Kolmonen (Third Division)		Tampere District (SPL Tampere)	10th	Relegation Playoff
2010	Tier 4	Kolmonen (Third Division)		Tampere District (SPL Tampere)	9th	
2011	Tier 4	Kolmonen (Third Division)		Tampere District (SPL Tampere)	6th	
2012	Tier 4	Kolmonen (Third Division)		Tampere District (SPL Tampere)	4th	
2013	Tier 4	Kolmonen (Third Division)		Tampere District (SPL Tampere)	5th	
2014	Tier 4	Kolmonen (Third Division)		Tampere District (SPL Tampere)	3rd	
2015	Tier 4	Kolmonen (Third Division)		Tampere District (SPL Tampere)	8th	
2016	Tier 4	Kolmonen (Third Division)		Tampere District (SPL Tampere)	11th	
2017	Tier 4	Kolmonen (Third Division)		Tampere District (SPL Tampere)	10th	
2018	Tier 4	Kolmonen (Third Division)		Tampere District (SPL Tampere)	9th	
2019	Tier 4	Kolmonen (Third Division)		Tampere District (SPL Tampere)	11th	

- 1 season in Mestaruussarja
- 18 seasons in Suomensarja
- 18 seasons in Kakkonen
- 31 seasons in Kolmonen
- 4 seasons in Nelonen
