= Pyrkivä Turku =

Finnish sports club

- Full name: Turun Pyrkivä
- Founded: 1906, Raunistula, Maaria
Home colours

Location of Turku

Pyrkivä Turku, Finnish Turun Pyrkivä, earlier Maarian Pyrkivä (pyrkivä meaning "endeavouring") is a sports club from Turku, Finland, which was founded in 1906 by sportsmen who represented artistic gymnastics.

The club was founded as a section of the Työväenyhdistys Tarmo (‘Workers Association Vigour’ or ‘Stamina’ of Raunistula, Maaria. In 1912 the club became independent of its parent organisation, and green was chosen as its colour.

In the early years the most popular sports were athletics and wrestling, but perhaps surprisingly, drama was also popular, and at best the club presented 16 different plays per year, and it also arranged screenings of movies.

Today the main sports of the club are association football, rink bandy, basketball, artistic gymnastics, badminton, table tennis, and athletics.

The gymnasts of Pyrkivä Turku have had considerable success both on the national and the international level: Kaino Lempinen was a member of the team that won gold in the 1952 Helsinki Olympics. The most recent successful gymnast from Pyrkivä has been Annukka Almenoksa, who won 18 Finnish championships (1998–2004) and is still the only Finnish woman who has reached the finals in a major international competition (2002 European Women's Artistic Gymnastics Championships).

In rink bandy Pyrkivä played in top flight, in the Finnish Rink Bandy League, until the end of the 2007–2008 season. The club is also active in bandy proper and ice hockey. In the former sport the club holds 11 championships in the competitions of the Finnish Workers' Sports Federation. The club played in the Finnish Bandy Championship Series in 1945. During the years 1948–1952 the club played in a Championship challenge against the bandy champion of the series governed by the Football Association of Finland, but they lost each time.

Pyrkivä has played two spells in the top flight of Finnish football, the Mestaruussarja, during 1952—1956 and during 1978—1979. In 1954 the club won the championship, and in 1952 it achieved bronze. In addition to this, the club has played 17 seasons on the second level, in Division I.

== Season to season ==
Season to Season

| Season | Level | Division | Section | Administration | Position | Movements |
|---|---|---|---|---|---|---|
| 1948 | Tier 2 | Suomensarja (Second Division) | South Group | Finnish FA (Suomen Palloliitto) | 6th | |
| 1949 | Tier 2 | Suomensarja (Second Division) | West Group | Finnish FA (Suomen Palloliitto) | 4th | |
| 1950 | Tier 2 | Suomensarja (Second Division) | West Group | Finnish FA (Suomen Palloliitto) | 3rd | |
| 1951 | Tier 2 | Suomensarja (Second Division) | West Group | Finnish FA (Suomen Palloliitto) | 1st | Promoted |
| 1952 | Tier 1 | Mestaruussarja (Premier League) | | Finnish FA (Suomen Palloliitto) | 3rd | |
| 1953 | Tier 1 | Mestaruussarja (Premier League) | | Finnish FA (Suomen Palloliitto) | 5th | |
| 1954 | Tier 1 | Mestaruussarja (Premier League) | | Finnish FA (Suomen Palloliitto) | 1st | Champions |
| 1955 | Tier 1 | Mestaruussarja (Premier League) | | Finnish FA (Suomen Palloliitto) | 7th | |
| 1956 | Tier 1 | Mestaruussarja (Premier League) | | Finnish FA (Suomen Palloliitto) | 10th | Relegated |
| 1957 | Tier 2 | Suomensarja (Second Division) | West Group | Finnish FA (Suomen Palloliitto) | 7th | |
| 1958 | Tier 2 | Suomensarja (Second Division) | West Group | Finnish FA (Suomen Palloliitto) | 8th | Relegated |
| 1959 | Tier 3 | Maakuntasarja (Third Division) | Group 3 Turku & Åland Islands | Finnish FA (Suomen Pallolitto) | 8th | Relegated |
| 1960 | Tier 4 | Aluesarja (Fourth Division) | Group 6 Turku & Åland Islands | Finnish FA (Suomen Pallolitto) | 2nd | Promotion play-offs |
| 1961 | Tier 4 | Aluesarja (Fourth Division) | Group 5 Turku | Finnish FA (Suomen Pallolitto) | 3rd | Relegation play-offs - Relegated |
| 1962 | Tier 5 | Piirinsarja (Fifth Division) | | Turku District (SPL Turku) | | Promoted |
| 1963 | Tier 4 | Aluesarja (Fourth Division) | Group 5 Turku | Finnish FA (Suomen Pallolitto) | 1st | Promoted |
| 1964 | Tier 3 | Maakuntasarja (Third Division) | Group 3 Turku & Åland Islands | Finnish FA (Suomen Pallolitto) | 2nd | |
| 1965 | Tier 3 | Maakuntasarja (Third Division) | Group 3 Turku | Finnish FA (Suomen Pallolitto) | 1st | Promoted |
| 1966 | Tier 2 | Suomensarja (Second Division) | West Group | Finnish FA (Suomen Palloliitto) | 9th | |
| 1967 | Tier 2 | Suomensarja (Second Division) | West Group | Finnish FA (Suomen Palloliitto) | 10th | |
| 1968 | Tier 2 | Suomensarja (Second Division) | West Group | Finnish FA (Suomen Palloliitto) | 4th | |
| 1969 | Tier 2 | Suomensarja (Second Division) | South Group | Finnish FA (Suomen Palloliitto) | 7th | |
| 1970 | Tier 2 | II Divisioona (Second Division) | West Group | Finnish FA (Suomen Palloliitto) | 5th | |
| 1971 | Tier 2 | II Divisioona (Second Division) | West Group | Finnish FA (Suomen Palloliitto) | 12th | Relegated |
| 1972 | Tier 3 | III Divisioona (Third Division) | Group 2 Turku & Åland Islands | Finnish FA (Suomen Pallolitto) | 6th | |
| 1973 | Tier 4 | III Divisioona (Third Division) | Group 3 Turku & Åland Islands | Finnish FA (Suomen Pallolitto) | 1st | Promoted |
| 1974 | Tier 3 | II Divisioona (Second Division) | West Group | Finnish FA (Suomen Pallolitto) | 1st | Promoted |
| 1975 | Tier 2 | I Divisioona (First Division) | | Finnish FA (Suomen Palloliitto) | 5th | |
| 1976 | Tier 2 | I Divisioona (First Division) | | Finnish FA (Suomen Palloliitto) | 9th | |
| 1977 | Tier 2 | I Divisioona (First Division) | | Finnish FA (Suomen Palloliitto) | 2nd | Promoted |
| 1978 | Tier 1 | Mestaruussarja (Premier League) | | Finnish FA (Suomen Palloliitto) | 10th | |
| 1979 | Tier 1 | Mestaruussarja (Premier League) | | Finnish FA (Suomen Palloliitto) | 11th | Relegation Group 5th - Relegated |
| 1980 | Tier 2 | I Divisioona (First Division) | | Finnish FA (Suomen Palloliitto) | 5th | Relegation Group 4th |
| 1981 | Tier 2 | I Divisioona (First Division) | | Finnish FA (Suomen Palloliitto) | 12th | Relegation Group 8th - Relegated |
| 1982-92 | | | | | | |
| 1993 | Tier 5 | Nelonen (Fourth Division) | Group 4 Turku & Åland Islands | Turku District (SPL Turku) | 10th | |

- 7 seasons in Veikkausliiga
- 17 seasons in Ykkönen
- 5 seasons in Kakkonen
- 4 season in Kolmonen
- 2 season in Nelonen
