= IF Drott =

Finnish sports club

Idrottsföreningen Drott is a Finnish sports club based in Jakobstad, Ostrobothnia. Founded in 1921, the club caters for multiple sports including bowling, volleyball, gymnastics and athletics. Previously, the club had been active in football, in which the men's team won the Finnish Cup in 1957. In 1965, IF Drott ceased operations in football, and later that year, FF Jaro was established as the premier football club in Jakobstad.

== Honours ==
- Finnish Cup
  - Winners (1): 1957

== Season to season ==
Season	Level	Division	Section	Administration	Position	Movements
1935	Tier 2	B-Sarja (Second Division)	West Group	Finnish FA (Suomen Pallolitto)	2nd	Promotion Group 2nd - Promoted
1936	Tier 1	A-Sarja (Premier League)		Finnish FA (Suomen Pallolitto)	8th	Relegated
1937	Tier 2	Itä-Länsi-sarja (Second Division)	West League	Finnish FA (Suomen Pallolitto)	2nd	
1938	Tier 2	Itä-Länsi-sarja (Second Division)	West League, North Group	Finnish FA (Suomen Pallolitto)	1st	Promotion Playoff
1939	Tier 2	Itä-Länsi-sarja (Second Division)	West League, Group 4	Finnish FA (Suomen Pallolitto)	1st	Promotion Group 3rd
1940-41	Tier 2	B-Sarja (Second Division)		Finnish FA (Suomen Pallolitto)	4th	
1943-44	Tier 2	Suomensarja (Second Division)		Finnish FA (Suomen Pallolitto)	3rd	Promoted
1945	Tier 1	A-Sarja (Premier League)	Group A	Finnish FA (Suomen Pallolitto)	4th	
1945-46	Tier 1	Mestaruussarja (Premier League)		Finnish FA (Suomen Pallolitto)	8th	Relegated
1946-47	Tier 2	Suomensarja (Second Division)	North	Finnish FA (Suomen Pallolitto)	8th	Relegated
1947-48	Tier 3	Maakuntasarja (Third Division)	Central Ostrobothnia	Finnish FA (Suomen Pallolitto)	3rd	
1948	Tier 3	Maakuntasarja (Third Division)	North Group A	Finnish FA (Suomen Pallolitto)	1st	Promotion Playoff
1949	Tier 3	Maakuntasarja (Third Division)	North Group B	Finnish FA (Suomen Pallolitto)	3rd	
1950	Tier 3	Maakuntasarja (Third Division)	North Group A	Finnish FA (Suomen Pallolitto)	2nd	
1951	Tier 3	Maakuntasarja (Third Division)	North Group A	Finnish FA (Suomen Pallolitto)	2nd	
1952	Tier 3	Maakuntasarja (Third Division)	North Group A	Finnish FA (Suomen Pallolitto)	1st	Promotion Group West 1st - Promoted
1953	Tier 2	Suomensarja (Second Division)	West	Finnish FA (Suomen Pallolitto)	7th	
1954	Tier 2	Suomensarja (Second Division)	West	Finnish FA (Suomen Pallolitto)	8th	
1955	Tier 2	Suomensarja (Second Division)	West	Finnish FA (Suomen Pallolitto)	4th	
1956	Tier 2	Suomensarja (Second Division)	West	Finnish FA (Suomen Pallolitto)	3rd	
1957	Tier 2	Suomensarja (Second Division)	West	Finnish FA (Suomen Pallolitto)	3rd	
1958	Tier 2	Suomensarja (Second Division)	North	Finnish FA (Suomen Pallolitto)	3rd	
1959	Tier 2	Suomensarja (Second Division)	North	Finnish FA (Suomen Pallolitto)	1st	Promoted
1960	Tier 1	Mestaruussarja (Premier League)		Finnish FA (Suomen Pallolitto)	12th	Relegated
1961	Tier 2	Suomensarja (Second Division)	North	Finnish FA (Suomen Pallolitto)	10th	Relegated
1962	Tier 3	Maakuntasarja (Third Division)	Group 8	Finnish FA (Suomen Pallolitto)	3rd	
1963	Tier 3	Maakuntasarja (Third Division)	Group 8	Finnish FA (Suomen Pallolitto)	2nd	
1964	Tier 3	Maakuntasarja (Third Division)	Group 8	Finnish FA (Suomen Pallolitto)	1st	Promoted
1965	Tier 2	Suomensarja (Second Division)	North	Finnish FA (Suomen Pallolitto)	12th	Relegated - League spot to FF Jaro

- 4 season in Veikkausliiga
- 16 seasons in Ykkönen
- 9 seasons in Kakkonen
