= Pallo-Iirot =

Finnish football club

- Full name: Pallo-Iirot
- Nickname: P-Iirot
- Founded: 1930
- Ground: Äijänsuon stadion, Rauma
- Capacity: 2,000
- Chairman: Tarmo Salvi
- Head Coach: Hannu Touru
- Coach: Scott Green
- League: Kakkonen
- 2026: Kakkonen Group B, 5th of 10
Home colours	Away colours

Pallo-Iirot (abbreviated P-Iirot) is a football club from Rauma in Finland. The club was formed in 1930 and their home ground is at the Äijänsuon stadion. The men's first team currently plays in the Kakkonen. The Chairman of Pallo-Iirot is Tarmo Salvi.

== Background ==
The club was known as Iirot when it was established in 1930 and it has since taken a number of forms:

- Iirot Rauma until 1968
- Hakrit Rauma from 1969 to 1981 (merger with Lukko Rauma)
- Pallo-Iirot Rauma since 1982

In the 1940s, the club also played bandy for a few years.

At the beginning of the 1990s the leading football clubs in Rauma, namely Rauman Pallo and Pallo-Iirot, merged to form Rauman Pallo-Iirot. A few years later the name reverted to Pallo-Iirot. The other club based in the town is FC Rauma.

Since 1982 Pallo-Iirot has played 14 seasons in the Ykkönen (First Division), the second tier of Finnish football, in the periods 1984–85, 1991, 1993–2001 and 2004–05.

They also have had six spells in the third tier, the Kakkonen (Second Division), covering 12 seasons from 1983, 1986–87, 1990, 1992, 2002–03 and 2006 to the present day.

The club has approximately 1,000 members comprising both boys and girls and offers the whole family the possibility to engage in football.

== Season to season ==
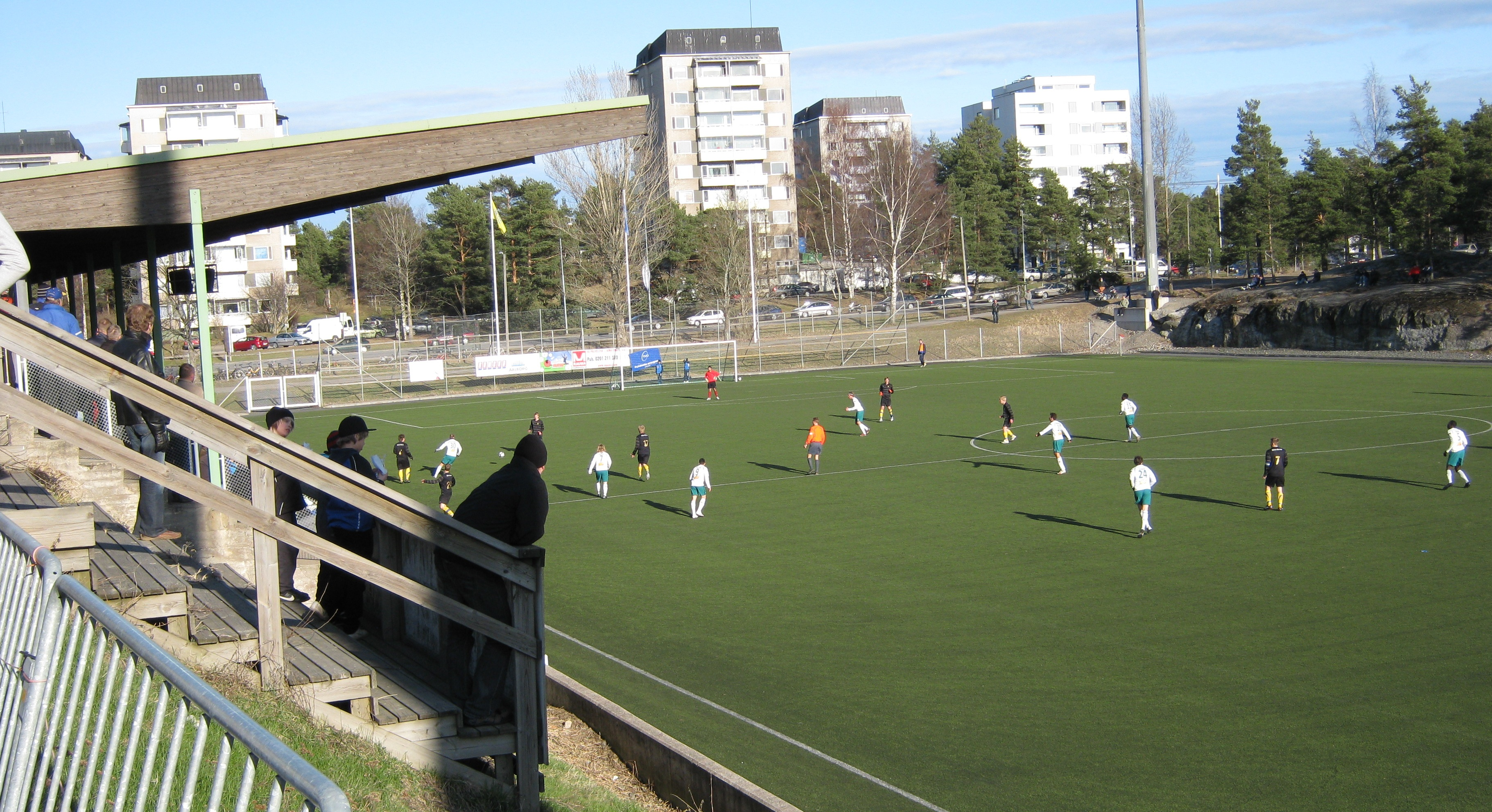
The club's home ground, Äijänsuo stadium.

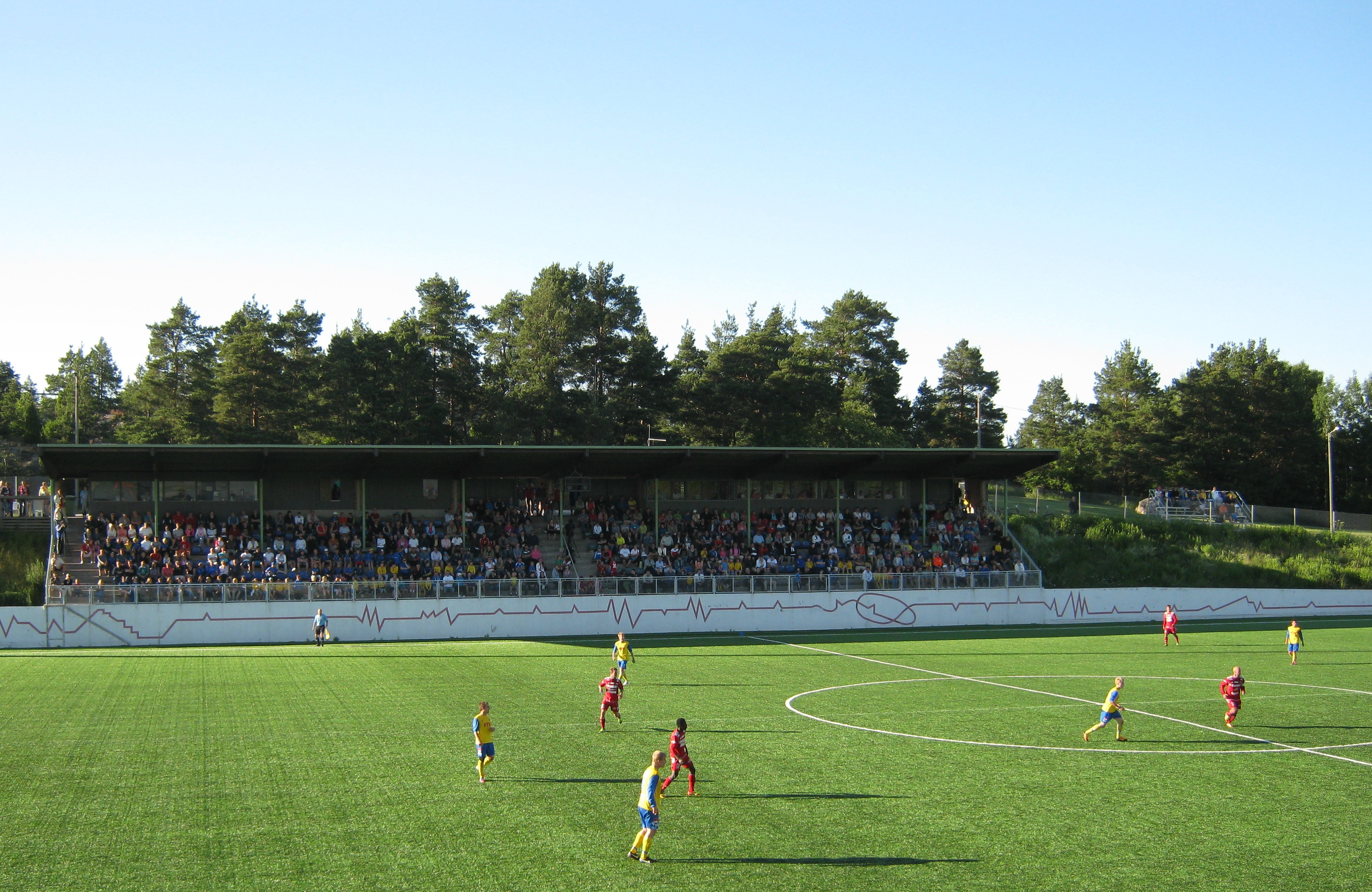
The main stand of Äijänsuo stadium.

Season to season of Pallo-Iirot

Season	Level	Division	Section	Administration	Position	Movements
1931	Tier 3	Piirinsarja (District League)		Finnish FA (Suomen Pallolitto)		Lost Final
1932						Unknown
1933	Tier 2	B-Sarja (Second Division)	Qualifiers	Finnish FA (Suomen Pallolitto)		
1934	Tier 2	B-Sarja (Second Division)	Western Group	Finnish FA (Suomen Pallolitto)	5th	
1935						Unknown
1936						Unknown
1937	Tier 3	Maakuntasarja (Regional League)		Finnish FA (Suomen Pallolitto)		Promoted
1938	Tier 2	Itä-Länsi Sarja (East-West Series)	West League, Northern Group	Finnish FA (Suomen Pallolitto)	5th	
1939	Tier 2	Itä-Länsi Sarja (East-West Series)	West League, Group 3	Finnish FA (Suomen Pallolitto)	5th	
1940–41	Tier 3	C-Sarja (Third Division)	Group 2	Finnish FA (Suomen Pallolitto)	2nd	
1943–44	Tier 3	Maakuntasarja (Regional League)	Cup Format	Finnish FA (Suomen Pallolitto)		1st round
1945	Tier 2	Suomensarja (Finland Series)	Group B	Finnish FA (Suomen Pallolitto)	6th	Relegated
1945–46	Tier 3	Maakuntasarja (Regional League)	Satakunta Group	Finnish FA (Suomen Pallolitto)	2nd	
1946–47	Tier 3	Maakuntasarja (Regional League)	Satakunta Group	Finnish FA (Suomen Pallolitto)	3rd	
1947–48	Tier 3	Maakuntasarja (Regional League)	Satakunta Group	Finnish FA (Suomen Pallolitto)	2nd	
1948	Tier 3	Maakuntasarja (Regional League)	West Group A	Finnish FA (Suomen Pallolitto)	4th	
1949	Tier 3	Maakuntasarja (Regional League)	West Group B	Finnish FA (Suomen Pallolitto)	2nd	Promotion Playoff
1950	Tier 3	Maakuntasarja (Regional League)	West Group B	Finnish FA (Suomen Pallolitto)	4th	
1951	Tier 3	Maakuntasarja (Regional League)	West Group B	Finnish FA (Suomen Pallolitto)	2nd	
1952	Tier 3	Maakuntasarja (Regional League)	West Group B	Finnish FA (Suomen Pallolitto)	5th	
1953	Tier 3	Maakuntasarja (Regional League)	West Group B	Finnish FA (Suomen Pallolitto)	5th	
1954	Tier 3	Maakuntasarja (Regional League)	West Group I	Finnish FA (Suomen Pallolitto)	3rd	
1955	Tier 3	Maakuntasarja (Regional League)	West Group I	Finnish FA (Suomen Pallolitto)	1st	Promotion Playoff – Promoted
1956	Tier 2	Suomensarja (Finland Series)	West Group	Finnish FA (Suomen Pallolitto)	6th	
1957	Tier 2	Suomensarja (Finland Series)	West Group	Finnish FA (Suomen Pallolitto)	10th	Relegated
1958	Tier 3	Maakuntasarja (Regional League)	Group 4	Finnish FA (Suomen Pallolitto)	2nd	
1959	Tier 3	Maakuntasarja (Regional League)	Group 5	Finnish FA (Suomen Pallolitto)	2nd	
1960	Tier 3	Maakuntasarja (Regional League)	Group 4	Finnish FA (Suomen Pallolitto)	2nd	
1961	Tier 3	Maakuntasarja (Regional League)	Group 6	Finnish FA (Suomen Pallolitto)	1st	Promoted
1962	Tier 2	Suomensarja (Finland Series)	West Group	Finnish FA (Suomen Pallolitto)	5th	
1963	Tier 2	Suomensarja (Finland Series)	West Group	Finnish FA (Suomen Pallolitto)	7th	
1964	Tier 2	Suomensarja (Finland Series)	West Group	Finnish FA (Suomen Pallolitto)	8th	
1965	Tier 2	Suomensarja (Finland Series)	West Group	Finnish FA (Suomen Pallolitto)	5th	
1966	Tier 2	Suomensarja (Finland Series)	West Group	Finnish FA (Suomen Pallolitto)	11th	Relegated
1967	Tier 3	Maakuntasarja (Regional League)	Group 4	Finnish FA (Suomen Pallolitto)	5th	
1968	Tier 3	Maakuntasarja (Regional League)	Group 4	Finnish FA (Suomen Pallolitto)	3rd	
1969	Tier 3	Maakuntasarja (Regional League)	Group 3	Finnish FA (Suomen Pallolitto)	8th	Merger with Lukko to Hakrit Rauma. Relegation Playoff
1970	Tier 3	3. Divisioona (Third Division)	Group 3	Finnish FA (Suomen Pallolitto)	8th	Hakrit Rauma
1971	Tier 3	3. Divisioona (Third Division)	Group 3	Finnish FA (Suomen Pallolitto)	5th	Hakrit Rauma
1972	Tier 3	3. Divisioona (Third Division)	Group 3	Finnish FA (Suomen Pallolitto)	9th	Hakrit Rauma. Relegation Playoff – Relegated
1973	Tier 5	4. Divisioona (Fourth Division)	Group 6	Finnish FA(Suomen Palloliitto)	1st	Hakrit Rauma. Promoted
1974	Tier 4	3. Divisioona (Third Division)	Group 4	Finnish FA (Suomen Pallolitto)	6th	Hakrit Rauma
1975	Tier 4	3. Divisioona (Third Division)	Group 4	Finnish FA (Suomen Pallolitto)	4th	Hakrit Rauma
1976	Tier 4	3. Divisioona (Third Division)	Group 4	Finnish FA (Suomen Pallolitto)	2nd	Hakrit Rauma
1977	Tier 4	3. Divisioona (Third Division)	Group 4	Finnish FA (Suomen Pallolitto)	1st	Hakrit Rauma. Promoted
1978	Tier 3	2. Divisioona (Second Division)	West Group	Finnish FA (Suomen Pallolitto)	8th	Hakrit Rauma
1979	Tier 3	2. Divisioona (Second Division)	West Group	Finnish FA (Suomen Pallolitto)	5th	Hakrit Rauma
1980	Tier 3	2. Divisioona (Second Division)	West Group	Finnish FA (Suomen Pallolitto)	9th	Hakrit Rauma. Relegation Playoff – Relegated
1981	Tier 4	3. Divisioona (Third Division)	Group 4	Finnish FA (Suomen Pallolitto)	3rd	Hakrit Rauma
1982	Tier 4	3. Divisioona (Third Division)	Group 4	Finnish FA (Suomen Pallolitto)	1st	Promotion Playoff – Promoted
1983	Tier 3	2. Divisioona (Second Division)	West Group	Finnish FA (Suomen Pallolitto)	1st	Promotion Playoff – Promoted
1984	Tier 2	1. Divisioona (First Division)		Finnish FA (Suomen Pallolitto)	8th	
1985	Tier 2	1. Divisioona (First Division)		Finnish FA (Suomen Pallolitto)	11th	Relegated
1986	Tier 3	2. Divisioona (Second Division)	West Group	Finnish FA (Suomen Pallolitto)	5th	
1987	Tier 3	2. Divisioona (Second Division)	West Group	Finnish FA (Suomen Pallolitto)	10th	Relegated
1988	Tier 4	3. Divisioona (Third Division)	Group 4	Finnish FA (Suomen Pallolitto)	6th	
1989	Tier 4	3. Divisioona (Third Division)	Group 4	Finnish FA (Suomen Pallolitto)	1st	Promoted
1990	Tier 3	2. Divisioona (Second Division)	West Group	Finnish FA (Suomen Pallolitto)	1st	Promoted
1991	Tier 2	1. Divisioona (First Division)		Finnish FA (Suomen Pallolitto)	10th	Relegated
1992	Tier 3	2. Divisioona (Second Division)	West Group	Finnish FA (Suomen Pallolitto)	1st	Promoted
1993	Tier 2	Ykkönen (First Division)		Finnish FA (Suomen Pallolitto)	10th	Relegation Group -5th
1994	Tier 2	Ykkönen (First Division)		Finnish FA (Suomen Pallolitto)	6th	
1995	Tier 2	Ykkönen (First Division)		Finnish FA (Suomen Pallolitto)	6th	
1996	Tier 2	Ykkönen (First Division)	North Group	Finnish FA (Suomen Pallolitto)	4th	
1997	Tier 2	Ykkönen (First Division)	North Group	Finnish FA (Suomen Pallolitto)	6th	Relegation Group – 1st
1998	Tier 2	Ykkönen (First Division)	South Group	Finnish FA (Suomen Pallolitto)	7th	Relegation Group – 3rd
1999	Tier 2	Ykkönen (First Division)	North Group	Finnish FA (Suomen Pallolitto)	6th	Relegation Group – 1st
2000	Tier 2	Ykkönen (First Division)	North Group	Finnish FA (Suomen Pallolitto)	7th	Relegation Group – 7th
2001	Tier 2	Ykkönen (First Division)	North Group	Finnish FA (Suomen Pallolitto)	9th	Relegated
2002	Tier 3	Kakkonen (Second Division)	West Group	Finnish FA (Suomen Pallolitto)	8th	
2003	Tier 3	Kakkonen (Second Division)	West Group	Finnish FA (Suomen Pallolitto)	1st	Play-offs – Promoted
2004	Tier 2	Ykkönen (First Division)		Finnish FA (Suomen Pallolitto)	10th	
2005	Tier 2	Ykkönen (First Division)		Finnish FA (Suomen Pallolitto)	14th	Relegated
2006	Tier 3	Kakkonen (Second Division)	Group B	Finnish FA (Suomen Pallolitto)	6th	
2007	Tier 3	Kakkonen (Second Division)	Group B	Finnish FA (Suomen Pallolitto)	9th	
2008	Tier 3	Kakkonen (Second Division)	Group B	Finnish FA (Suomen Pallolitto)	6th	
2009	Tier 3	Kakkonen (Second Division)	Group B	Finnish FA (Suomen Pallolitto)	5th	
2010	Tier 3	Kakkonen (Second Division)	Group B	Finnish FA (Suomen Pallolitto)	4th	
2011	Tier 3	Kakkonen (Second Division)	Group B	Finnish FA (Suomen Pallolitto)	3rd	
2012	Tier 3	Kakkonen (Second Division)	West Group	Finnish FA (Suomen Pallolitto)	3rd	
2013	Tier 3	Kakkonen (Second Division)	West Group	Finnish FA (Suomen Pallolitto)	3rd	
2014	Tier 3	Kakkonen (Second Division)	West Group	Finnish FA (Suomen Pallolitto)	8th	
2015	Tier 3	Kakkonen (Second Division)	West Group	Finnish FA (Suomen Pallolitto)	8th	Relegated
2016	Tier 4	Kolmonen (Third Division)	Tampereen	Finnish FA (Suomen Pallolitto)	3rd	
2017	Tier 4	Kolmonen (Third Division)	Länsi-Suomen	Finnish FA (Suomen Pallolitto)	3rd	
2018	Tier 4	Kolmonen (Third Division)	Länsi-Suomen	Finnish FA (Suomen Pallolitto)	1st	Promoted
2019	Tier 3	Kakkonen (Second Division)	Group B	Finnish FA (Suomen Pallolitto)	7th	
2020	Tier 3	Kakkonen (Second Division)	Group B	Finnish FA (Suomen Pallolitto)	12th	Relegated
2021	Tier 4	Kolmonen (Third Division)	Group A	Finnish FA (Suomen Pallolitto)	1st	Promotion Playoff
2022	Tier 4	Kolmonen (Third Division)	Group A	Finnish FA (Suomen Pallolitto)	1st	Promoted
2023	Tier 3	Kakkonen (Second Division)	Group B	Finnish FA (Suomen Pallolitto)	8th	
2024	Tier 4	Kakkonen (Second Division)	Group B	Finnish FA (Suomen Pallolitto)	6th	
2025	Tier 4	Kakkonen (Second Division)	Group B	Finnish FA (Suomen Pallolitto)		

== Junior section ==
Pallo-Iirot has the Seal of approval for football which is an acknowledgement for quality of its youth activities in Finland. The club's youth team's programme is based on the active participation of the parents. P-Iirot welcomes the parents together with their children to join the club activities by becoming the youth teams' coaches, and managers or to otherwise support their children's team's activities.

The Nappulaliiga (Little league) offers sports and games, emphasising football, twice a week for the ages of 3 to 11 years. The programme runs from April until September.

== Club structure ==
Pallo-Iirot currently has 2 men's teams, 1 ladies team, 9 boys teams and 4 girls teams. In the winter the club practices at Äijänsuo indoor hall and on the heated astro-turf.

== Current squad ==
As of 3 June 2020

Note: Flags indicate national team as defined under FIFA eligibility rules; some limited exceptions apply. Players may hold more than one non-FIFA nationality.

No.	Pos.	Nation	Player
1	GK	FIN	Miko Lainio
2	DF	FIN	Jere Niiranen
4	DF	FIN	Otto Schultz
5	DF	RUS	Kirill Radchenko
6	DF	FIN	Matias Majapuros
7	MF	FIN	Juho Torkkeli
8	MF	ENG	James Whiting
9	FW	NGR	Chinedu Akuvuo
10	FW	BRA	Nicolas Gomes
11	FW	ARU	Randell Harrevelt

No.	Pos.	Nation	Player
12	GK	FIN	Henri Saarinen
15	MF	FIN	Marcus Walden
17	MF	FIN	Miska Rantamäki
18	MF	FIN	Aake Rapala
20	FW	FIN	Alexander Tomberg
22	MF	FIN	Topias Silvennoinen
30	MF	ENG	Stanley Bridgeman
—	MF	NGR	Target Ayannubi
—	FW	FIN	Elias Ahde
