= Rauman Pallo =

Finnish sports club

- Founded: 1949
- Dissolved: 1991
- Ground: Äijänsuo Stadium, Rauma
- Capacity: 2,000
Home colours

Rauman Pallo was a sports club established in 1949 from Rauma, Finland, playing football, bandy and ice hockey. It was dissolved in 1991 as the club merged with Pallo-Iirot. Rauman Pallo played mainly in the second and third tiers of Finnish football.

== Notable former managers ==
- (Finland) Juha Malinen
- (Finland) Hannu Touru
