= Kotkan Reipas =

Finnish sports club

Kotkan Reipas is a sports club founded in Kristiina district of Kotka, Finland, in 1938. The club participates in floorball, ice hockey, and volleyball.

Reipas football department played two seasons in the highest level of Finnish football, Mestaruussarja. Their home stadium was fi:Puistolan urheilukenttä.

The club won the TUL championship of 1951 in basketball and the TUL championship in ice hockey in 1954.

== Season to season in football ==
Season to Season

Season	Level	Division	Section	Administration	Position	Movements
1948	Tier 2	Suomensarja (Second Division)	South Group	Finnish FA (Suomen Palloliitto)	8th	
1949	Tier 2	Suomensarja (Second Division)	East Group	Finnish FA (Suomen Palloliitto)	8th	Relegated
1950	Tier 3	Suomensarja Qualifying (Third Division)	East Group	Finnish FA (Suomen Pallolitto)	5th	Qualified from TUL Leagues
1951	Tier 3	Suomensarja Qualifying (Third Division)	East Group	Finnish FA (Suomen Pallolitto)	3rd	Qualified from TUL Leagues
1952	Tier 3	Suomensarja Qualifying (Third Division)	East Group	Finnish FA (Suomen Pallolitto)	2nd	Qualified from TUL Leagues - Promoted
1953	Tier 2	Suomensarja (Second Division)	East Group	Finnish FA (Suomen Palloliitto)	5th	
1954	Tier 2	Suomensarja (Second Division)	East Group	Finnish FA (Suomen Palloliitto)	1st	Promoted
1955	Tier 1	Mestaruussarja (Premier Division)		Finnish FA (Suomen Palloliitto)	10th	Relegated
1956	Tier 2	Suomensarja (Second Division)	East Group	Finnish FA (Suomen Palloliitto)	1st	Promoted
1957	Tier 1	Mestaruussarja (Premier Division)		Finnish FA (Suomen Palloliitto)	10th	Relegated
1958	Tier 2	Suomensarja (Second Division)	South Group	Finnish FA (Suomen Palloliitto)	5th	
1959	Tier 2	Suomensarja (Second Division)	South Group	Finnish FA (Suomen Palloliitto)	7th	
1960	Tier 2	Suomensarja (Second Division)	South Group	Finnish FA (Suomen Palloliitto)	12th	Relegated
1961	Tier 3	Maakuntasarja (Third Division)	Group 4	Finnish FA (Suomen Pallolitto)	5th	
1962	Tier 3	Maakuntasarja (Third Division)	Group 4	Finnish FA (Suomen Pallolitto)	7th	Relegated
1963	Tier 4	Aluesarja (Fourth Division)	Group 10	Finnish FA (Suomen Pallolitto)	1st	Promoted
1964	Tier 3	Maakuntasarja (Third Division)	Group 5	Finnish FA (Suomen Pallolitto)	5th	
1965	Tier 3	Maakuntasarja (Third Division)	Group 5	Finnish FA (Suomen Pallolitto)	5th	
1966	Tier 3	Maakuntasarja (Third Division)	Group 2	Finnish FA (Suomen Pallolitto)	5th	
1967	Tier 3	Maakuntasarja (Third Division)	Group 6	Finnish FA (Suomen Pallolitto)	3rd	
1968	Tier 3	Maakuntasarja (Third Division)	Group 5	Finnish FA (Suomen Pallolitto)	7th	
1969	Tier 3	Maakuntasarja (Third Division)	Group 5	Finnish FA (Suomen Pallolitto)	9th	Relegated
1970	Tier 4	IV Divisioona (Fourth Division)	Group 10	Finnish FA (Suomen Pallolitto)	7th	Relegation Playoff - Relegated
1971-2005	Unknown					
2006	Tier 6	Vitonen (Fifth Division)	South Group	South-East District (SPL Kaakkois-Suomi)	1st	Promoted
2007	Tier 5	Nelonen (Fourth Division)		South-East District (SPL Kaakkois-Suomi)	7th	
2008	Tier 5	Nelonen (Fourth Division)		South-East District (SPL Kaakkois-Suomi)	2nd	Promoted
2009	Tier 4	Kolmonen (Third Division)		South-East District (SPL Kaakkois-Suomi)	7th	
2010	Tier 4	Kolmonen (Third Division)		South-East District (SPL Kaakkois-Suomi)		Withdrew
2011	Tier 4	Kolmonen (Third Division)		South-East District (SPL Kaakkois-Suomi)	9th	Disbanded

- 2 seasons in Mestaruussarja
- 8 seasons in Suomensarja
- 11 seasons in Maakuntasarja
- 4 seasons in Kolmonen
- 2 seasons in Nelonen
- 1 seasons in Vitonen
