= Turun Toverit =

Finnish sports club

Turun Toverit (TuTo) is a sports club based in Turku, Finland. It was established in 1929. Today it is best known of its ice hockey section TuTo Hockey. Other sections include sports like football, basketball, volleyball, wrestling and athletics. TuTo is a member of Finnish Workers' Sports Federation.

Most famous TuTo-athlete of all-time is Voitto Hellstén, the 400 metres bronze medalist at the 1956 Summer Olympics.

== Ice hockey ==
TuTo Hockey plays currently in the Finnish second level Mestis.

== Football ==
Football section of TuTo has played five seasons in the Finnish top division Mestaruussarja. Their best achievement is second place in 1947. Season 2020 TuTo plays in the seventh tier Kutonen.

=== Season to season ===
Season to Season

Season	Level	Division	Section	Administration	Position	Movements
1946-47	Tier 1	Championship Playoff (Premier League)		Finnish FA & TUL (Suomen Palloliitto & Työväen Urheiluliitto)	2nd	
1948	Tier 1	Mestaruussarja (Premier League)		Finnish FA & TUL (Suomen Palloliitto & Työväen Urheiluliitto)	8th	
1949	Tier 1	Mestaruussarja (Premier League)		Finnish FA (Suomen Palloliitto)	12th	Relegated
1950	Tier 2	Suomensarja (Second Division)	West Group	Finnish FA (Suomen Palloliitto)	7th	
1951	Tier 2	Suomensarja (Second Division)	West Group	Finnish FA (Suomen Palloliitto)	4th	
1952	Tier 2	Suomensarja (Second Division)	West Group	Finnish FA (Suomen Palloliitto)	2nd	
1953	Tier 2	Suomensarja (Second Division)	West Group	Finnish FA (Suomen Palloliitto)	1st	Promoted
1954	Tier 1	Mestaruussarja (Premier League)		Finnish FA(Suomen Palloliitto)	5th	
1955	Tier 1	Mestaruussarja (Premier League)		Finnish FA(Suomen Palloliitto)	9th	Relegation Playoff - Relegated
1956	Tier 2	Suomensarja (Second Division)	West Group	Finnish FA (Suomen Palloliitto)	4th	
1957	Tier 2	Suomensarja (Second Division)	West Group	Finnish FA (Suomen Palloliitto)	2nd	
1958	Tier 2	Suomensarja (Second Division)	West Group	Finnish FA (Suomen Palloliitto)	2nd	
1959	Tier 2	Suomensarja (Second Division)	West Group	Finnish FA (Suomen Palloliitto)	9th	
1960	Tier 2	Suomensarja (Second Division)	South Group	Finnish FA (Suomen Palloliitto)	1st	Promoted
1961	Tier 1	Mestaruussarja (Premier League)		Finnish FA(Suomen Palloliitto)	12th	Relegated
1962	Tier 2	Suomensarja (Second Division)	West Group	Finnish FA (Suomen Palloliitto)	6th	
1963	Tier 2	Suomensarja (Second Division)	West Group	Finnish FA (Suomen Palloliitto)	4th	
1964	Tier 2	Suomensarja (Second Division)	West Group	Finnish FA (Suomen Palloliitto)	5th	
1965	Tier 2	Suomensarja (Second Division)	West Group	Finnish FA (Suomen Palloliitto)	4th	
1966	Tier 2	Suomensarja (Second Division)	West Group	Finnish FA (Suomen Palloliitto)	5th	
1967	Tier 2	Suomensarja (Second Division)	West Group	Finnish FA (Suomen Palloliitto)	3rd	
1968	Tier 2	Suomensarja (Second Division)	West Group	Finnish FA (Suomen Palloliitto)	3rd	
1969	Tier 2	Suomensarja (Second Division)	South Group	Finnish FA (Suomen Palloliitto)	5th	
1970	Tier 2	II Divisioona (Second Division)	West Group	Finnish FA (Suomen Palloliitto)	2nd	Promotion Group 3rd
1971	Tier 2	II Divisioona (Second Division)	West Group	Finnish FA (Suomen Palloliitto)	8th	
1972	Tier 2	II Divisioona (Second Division)	West Group	Finnish FA (Suomen Palloliitto)	8th	Did not qualify to new I Divisioona
1973	Tier 3	II Divisioona (Second Division)	West Group	Finnish FA (Suomen Pallolitto)	2nd	Promotion Playoff - Promoted
1974	Tier 2	I Divisioona (First Division)		Finnish FA (Suomen Palloliitto)	9th	
1975	Tier 2	I Divisioona (First Division)		Finnish FA (Suomen Palloliitto)	10th	Relegated
1976	Tier 3	II Divisioona (Second Division)	West Group	Finnish FA (Suomen Pallolitto)	9th	
1977	Tier 3	II Divisioona (Second Division)	West Group	Finnish FA (Suomen Pallolitto)	9th	
1978	Tier 3	II Divisioona (Second Division)	West Group	Finnish FA (Suomen Pallolitto)	5th	
1979	Tier 3	II Divisioona (Second Division)	West Group	Finnish FA (Suomen Pallolitto)	10th	Relegation Playoff
1980	Tier 3	II Divisioona (Second Division)	West Group	Finnish FA (Suomen Pallolitto)	12th	Relegated
1981	Tier 4	III Divisioona (Third Division)	Group 3	Finnish FA (Suomen Pallolitto)	3rd	
1982	Tier 4	III Divisioona (Third Division)	Group 3	Finnish FA (Suomen Pallolitto)	1st	Promotion Playoff - Promoted
1983	Tier 3	II Divisioona (Second Division)	West Group	Finnish FA (Suomen Pallolitto)	10th	Relegation Playoff
1984	Tier 3	II Divisioona (Second Division)	West Group	Finnish FA (Suomen Pallolitto)	8th	
1985	Tier 3	II Divisioona (Second Division)	West Group	Finnish FA (Suomen Pallolitto)	2nd	
1986	Tier 3	II Divisioona (Second Division)	West Group	Finnish FA (Suomen Pallolitto)	2nd	
1987	Tier 3	II Divisioona (Second Division)	West Group	Finnish FA (Suomen Pallolitto)	1st	Promoted
1988	Tier 2	I Divisioona (First Division)		Finnish FA (Suomen Palloliitto)	3rd	
1989	Tier 2	I Divisioona (First Division)		Finnish FA (Suomen Palloliitto)	10th	Relegated
1990	Tier 3	II Divisioona (Second Division)	West Group	Finnish FA (Suomen Pallolitto)	4th	
1991	Tier 3	II Divisioona (Second Division)	West Group	Finnish FA (Suomen Pallolitto)	7th	
1992	Tier 3	II Divisioona (Second Division)	West Group	Finnish FA (Suomen Pallolitto)	8th	Gave their league spot to Inter Turku
1993-98		Turku District Leagues		Turku District (SPL Turku)		
1999	Tier 6	Vitonen (Fifth Division)	Group 2	Turku District (SPL Turku)		Promoted
2000	Tier 5	Nelonen (Fourth Division)		Turku District (SPL Turku)		Relegation Group 1st
2001	Tier 5	Nelonen (Fourth Division)	Group 2	Turku District (SPL Turku)	4th	Promotion Group 8th
2002	Tier 5	Nelonen (Fourth Division)	Group 2	Turku District (SPL Turku)	4th	Promotion Group 1st - Promoted
2003	Tier 4	Kolmonen (Third Division)	Turku & Åland Islands	Turku District (SPL Turku)	10th	
2004	Tier 4	Kolmonen (Third Division)	Turku & Åland Islands	Turku District (SPL Turku)	4th	
2005	Tier 4	Kolmonen (Third Division)	Turku & Åland Islands	Turku District (SPL Turku)	1st	Promotion Group West 3rd
2006	Tier 4	Kolmonen (Third Division)	Turku & Åland Islands	Turku District (SPL Turku)	4th	
2007	Tier 4	Kolmonen (Third Division)	Turku & Åland Islands	Turku District (SPL Turku)	2nd	
2008	Tier 4	Kolmonen (Third Division)	Turku & Åland Islands	Turku District (SPL Turku)	1st	Promotion Group South 4th
2009	Tier 4	Kolmonen (Third Division)	Turku & Åland Islands	Turku District (SPL Turku)	2nd	
2010	Tier 4	Kolmonen (Third Division)	Turku & Åland Islands	Turku District (SPL Turku)	1st	Promoted
2011	Tier 3	Kakkonen (Second Division)	Group B	Finnish FA (Suomen Pallolitto)	12th	Relegated
2012	Tier 4	Kolmonen (Third Division)	Turku & Åland Islands	Turku District (SPL Turku)	11th	
2013	Tier 4	Kolmonen (Third Division)	Turku & Åland Islands	Turku District (SPL Turku)	12th	Relegated
2014	Tier 5	Nelonen (Fourth Division)	Turku & Åland Islands	Turku District (SPL Turku)	12th	Relegated
2015	Tier 6	Vitonen (Fifth Division)	Group 2	Turku District (SPL Turku)	12th	Relegated
2016	Tier 7	Kutonen (Sixth Division)	Group 2	Turku District (SPL Turku)	6th	
2017	Tier 7	Kutonen (Sixth Division)	Group 2	Western District (SPL Länsi-Suomi)	3rd	
2018	Tier 7	Kutonen (Sixth Division)	Group 3	Western District (SPL Länsi-Suomi)	6th	
2019	Tier 7	Kutonen (Sixth Division)	Group 1	Western District (SPL Länsi-Suomi)	6th	
2020	Tier 7	Kutonen (Sixth Division)	Group 1	Western District (SPL Länsi-Suomi)		

- 6 seasons in Veikkausliiga
- 24 seasons in Ykkönen
- 15 seasons in Kakkonen
- 12 seasons in Kolmonen
- 4 seasons in Nelonen
- 2 seasons in Vitonen
- 5 season in Kutonen
