= FC Kiffen 08 =

Association football club in Finland

Kiffen
- Full name: Kronohagens Idrottsförening
- Nicknames: Kiffen, Mustat Hurmurit (Black Enchanters)
- Founded: 27 September 1908; 118 years ago
- Ground: Pallokenttä, Helsinki, Finland
- Capacity: 3,000
- Chairman: Henrik Lindström
- Manager: Niko Leppänen
- League: Kakkonen
- 2026: Kakkonen Group A, 1st of 10
Home colours	Away colours

Kronohagens Idrottsförening (abbreviated KIF or Kiffen) (English: Kruununhaka Sports Association) is a sports club from Helsinki, Finland. The club was founded on 27 September 1908, and has been mainly known for the achievements of its association football and handball teams. In the past the club also played at the top level in ice hockey and has won the Kalevan malja (Kaleva Cup) in athletics. Other sports that the club participates include shooting, bandy, bowling, and boxing.

The men's football team is historically one of the most successful teams in Finland, and won the national football championship on three occasions during the 1910s, but currently plays in the Kakkonen (Second Division), the fourth tier of Finnish football. The football section of Kronohagens Idrottsforening is now known as FC Kiffen 08.

== Football ==
=== History ===
Kiffen football is known as the Mustat Hurmurit (Black charmers). The name comes from the late 1920s when the black coloured jersey was first introduced bu Kiffen bandy team. Kiffen had two representatives, Ragnar Wickström and Lars Schybergson, in the Finnish football team at the Stockholm Olympics in 1912. The club then won the Finnish football championship (Mestaruussarja) in 1913, 1915 and 1916 in the years prior to Finnish independence in 1917. Kiffen's last championship win came much later in 1955.

The decline in Kiffen football set in a decade later when the club were relegated from the Mestaruussarja and then a further relegation from the Suomensarja (Finland League), the second tier, followed in 1965 to the Maakuntasarja, the third tier. Fortunes fluctuated in the late 1960s and early 1970s before the club made its last appearances in the Mestaruussarja in 1977 and 1978. Among the players representing Kiffen at that time were Erkki Alaja, Juha Dahllund, Kai Haaskivi, Atik Ismail and Reima Kokko.

The following year in 1978 Kiffen had dropped to the Ykkönen (First Division) and in the subsequent years the club have not reached second-tier football. Over the last 30 years the club has fluctuated between the Kakkonen (Second Division) and Kolmonen (Third Division).

In 1982 and 1983 Kiffen's ladies team reached the Finnish Women's league championship qualifiers and from 1984 until 1989 played in the Premier Division after which the team withdrew with their divisional place being inherited by MP Mikkeli.

=== Honours and achievements ===
- Finnish Champions (Mestaruussarja Winners): 1913, 1915, 1916 and 1955
- Finnish Cup (Suomen Cup): Runners–up in 1958 (2–4 to KTP Kotka).

=== Divisional movements since 1930 ===
Top Level (25 seasons): 1930–32, 1940/41–46/47, 1948–57, 1960–64, 1977–78
Second Level (16 seasons): 1936–39, 1947/48, 1958/59, 1965, 1969–74, 1976, 1979
Third Level (21 seasons): 1975, 1980–85, 1990, 1994–2004, 2009–2012, 2015–

=== Season to season ===
Season to season of Kiffen

Season	Level	Division	Section	Administration	Position	Movements
1930	Tier 1	A-Sarja (Premier League)		Finnish FA (Suomen Palloliitto)	6th	
1931	Tier 1	A-Sarja (Premier League)		Finnish FA (Suomen Palloliitto)	4th	
1932	Tier 1	A-Sarja (Premier League)		Finnish FA (Suomen Palloliitto)	8th	Relegated
1933	Tier 2	B-Sarja (Second Division)	Helsinki Region Qualifying	Finnish FA (Suomen Palloliitto)		Did not Qualify to nationwide league
1934	Tier 2	B-Sarja (Second Division)	Western Group	Finnish FA (Suomen Palloliitto)	4th	
1935	Tier 2	B-Sarja (Second Division)	West League	Finnish FA (Suomen Palloliitto)	5th	
1936	Tier 2	Itä-Länsi-sarja (Second Division)	West League	Finnish FA (Suomen Palloliitto)	3rd	
1937	Tier 2	Itä-Länsi-sarja (Second Division)	West League	Finnish FA (Suomen Palloliitto)	3rd	
1938	Tier 2	Itä-Länsi-sarja (Second Division)	West League, South Group	Finnish FA (Suomen Palloliitto)	1st	Promotion Playoff
1939	Tier 2	Itä-Länsi-sarja (Second Division)	West League, Group 1	Finnish FA (Suomen Palloliitto)	1st	Promotion Group West 1st – Promoted
1940	Tier 1	Cup-Competition	Cup format	Finnish FA(Suomen Palloliitto)	Quarter-finals	
1940–41	Tier 1	Mestaruussarja (Premier League)		Finnish FA (Suomen Palloliitto)	6th	
1942	Tier 1	Cup-Competition	Cup format	Finnish FA & TUL (Suomen Palloliitto & Työväen Urheiluliitto)	Quarter-finals	
1943–44	Tier 1	Mestaruussarja (Premier League)		Finnish FA (Suomen Palloliitto)	4th	Qualifying round 2nd
1945	Tier 1	SPL Mestaruussarja (Premier League)	Groub B	Finnish FA (Suomen Palloliitto)	4th	
1945	Tier 1	Cup-Competition	Cup format	Finnish FA & TUL (Suomen Palloliitto & Työväen Urheiluliitto)	Round of 32	
1945–46	Tier 1	SPL Mestaruussarja (Premier League)		Finnish FA (Suomen Palloliitto)	5th	
1946–47	Tier 1	SPL Mestaruussarja (Premier League)		Finnish FA (Suomen Palloliitto)	8th	Relegated
1947–48	Tier 2	Suomensarja (Second Division)	South Group	Finnish FA (Suomen Palloliitto)	1st	Promotion Group 1st – Promoted
1948	Tier 1	Mestaruussarja (Premier League)		Finnish FA (Suomen Palloliitto)	6th	
1949	Tier 1	Mestaruussarja (Premier League)		Finnish FA (Suomen Palloliitto)	3rd	
1950	Tier 1	Mestaruussarja (Premier League)		Finnish FA (Suomen Palloliitto)	6th	
1951	Tier 1	Mestaruussarja (Premier League)		Finnish FA (Suomen Palloliitto)	7th	
1952	Tier 1	Mestaruussarja (Premier League)		Finnish FA (Suomen Palloliitto)	8th	
1953	Tier 1	Mestaruussarja (Premier League)		Finnish FA (Suomen Palloliitto)	7th	
1954	Tier 1	Mestaruussarja (Premier League)		Finnish FA (Suomen Palloliitto)	7th	
1955	Tier 1	Mestaruussarja (Premier League)		Finnish FA (Suomen Palloliitto)	1st	Champions
1956	Tier 1	Mestaruussarja (Premier League)		Finnish FA (Suomen Palloliitto)	3rd	
1957	Tier 1	Mestaruussarja (Premier League)		Finnish FA (Suomen Palloliitto)	9th	Relegated
1958	Tier 2	Suomensarja (Second Division)	South Group	Finnish FA (Suomen Palloliitto)	2nd	
1959	Tier 2	Suomensarja (Second Division)	South Group	Finnish FA (Suomen Palloliitto)	1st	Promoted
1960	Tier 1	Mestaruussarja (Premier League)		Finnish FA (Suomen Palloliitto)	3rd	
1961	Tier 1	Mestaruussarja (Premier League)		Finnish FA (Suomen Palloliitto)	2nd	
1962	Tier 1	Mestaruussarja (Premier League)		Finnish FA (Suomen Palloliitto)	9th	
1963	Tier 1	Mestaruussarja (Premier League)		Finnish FA (Suomen Palloliitto)	9th	
1964	Tier 1	Mestaruussarja (Premier League)		Finnish FA (Suomen Palloliitto)	12th	Relegated
1965	Tier 2	Suomensarja (Second Division)	West Group	Finnish FA (Suomen Palloliitto)	12th	Relegated
1966	Tier 3	Maakuntasarja (Third Division)	Group 1 Helsinki	Finnish FA (Suomen Pallolitto)	3rd	
1967	Tier 3	Maakuntasarja (Third Division)	Group 1 Helsinki & Uusimaa	Finnish FA (Suomen Pallolitto)	2nd	
1968	Tier 3	Maakuntasarja (Third Division)	Group 1 Helsinki & Uusimaa	Finnish FA (Suomen Pallolitto)	1st	Promoted
1969	Tier 2	Suomensarja (Second Division)	East Group	Finnish FA (Suomen Palloliitto)	2nd	
1970	Tier 2	II Divisioona (Second Division)	East Group	Finnish FA (Suomen Palloliitto)	5th	
1971	Tier 2	II Divisioona (Second Division)	East Group	Finnish FA (Suomen Palloliitto)	8th	
1972	Tier 2	II Divisioona (Second Division)	East Group	Finnish FA (Suomen Palloliitto)	4th	
1973	Tier 2	I Divisioona (First Division)		Finnish FA (Suomen Palloliitto)	8th	
1974	Tier 2	I Divisioona (First Division)		Finnish FA (Suomen Palloliitto)	12th	Relegated
1975	Tier 3	II Divisioona (Second Division)	East Group	Finnish FA (Suomen Pallolitto)	1st	Promoted
1976	Tier 2	I Divisioona (First Division)		Finnish FA (Suomen Palloliitto)	1st	Promoted
1977	Tier 1	Mestaruussarja (Premier League)		Finnish FA (Suomen Palloliitto)	8th	
1978	Tier 1	Mestaruussarja (Premier League)		Finnish FA (Suomen Palloliitto)	11th	Relegated
1979	Tier 2	I Divisioona (First Division)		Finnish FA (Suomen Palloliitto)	12th	Relegation Group 8th – Relegated
1980	Tier 3	II Divisioona (Second Division)	East Group	Finnish FA (Suomen Pallolitto)	8th	
1981	Tier 3	II Divisioona (Second Division)	East Group	Finnish FA (Suomen Pallolitto)	9th	
1982	Tier 3	II Divisioona (Second Division)	East Group	Finnish FA (Suomen Pallolitto)	5th	
1983	Tier 3	II Divisioona (Second Division)	East Group	Finnish FA (Suomen Pallolitto)	7th	
1984	Tier 3	II Divisioona (Second Division)	East Group	Finnish FA (Suomen Pallolitto)	7th	
1985	Tier 3	II Divisioona (Second Division)	West Group	Finnish FA (Suomen Pallolitto)	11th	Relegated
1986	Tier 4	III divisioona (Third Division)	Group 2	Helsinki & Uusimaa	4th	
1987	Tier 4	III divisioona (Third Division)	Group 2	Helsinki & Uusimaa	9th	
1988	Tier 4	III divisioona (Third Division)	Group 2	Helsinki & Uusimaa	8th	
1989	Tier 4	III divisioona (Third Division)	Group 1	Helsinki & Uusimaa	1st	Promoted
1990	Tier 3	II Divisioona (Second Division)	East Group	Finnish FA (Suomen Pallolitto)	11th	Relegated
1991	Tier 4	III divisioona (Third Division)	Group 2	Helsinki & Uusimaa	7th	
1992	Tier 4	III divisioona (Third Division)	Group 1	Helsinki & Uusimaa	5th	
1993	Tier 4	III divisioona (Third Division)	Group 2	Helsinki & Uusimaa	2nd	Promoted
1994	Tier 3	Kakkonen (Second Division)	South Group	Finnish FA (Suomen Pallolitto)	9th	
1995	Tier 3	Kakkonen (Second Division)	South Group	Finnish FA (Suomen Pallolitto)	4th	
1996	Tier 3	Kakkonen (Second Division)	South Group	Finnish FA (Suomen Pallolitto)	6th	
1997	Tier 3	Kakkonen (Second Division)	South Group	Finnish FA (Suomen Pallolitto)	8th	
1998	Tier 3	Kakkonen (Second Division)	East Group	Finnish FA (Suomen Pallolitto)	5th	
1999	Tier 3	Kakkonen (Second Division)	South Group	Finnish FA (Suomen Pallolitto)	3rd	
2000	Tier 3	Kakkonen (Second Division)	South Group	Finnish FA (Suomen Pallolitto)	5th	
2001	Tier 3	Kakkonen (Second Division)	South Group	Finnish FA (Suomen Pallolitto)	7th	
2002	Tier 3	Kakkonen (Second Division)	South Group	Finnish FA (Suomen Pallolitto)	6th	
2003	Tier 3	Kakkonen (Second Division)	South Group	Finnish FA (Suomen Pallolitto)	10th	
2004	Tier 3	Kakkonen (Second Division)	South Group	Finnish FA (Suomen Pallolitto)	12th	Relegated
2005	Tier 4	Kolmonen (Third Division)	Section 1	Helsinki & Uusimaa (SPL Uusimaa)	3rd	
2006	Tier 4	Kolmonen (Third Division)	Section 3	Helsinki & Uusimaa (SPL Helsinki)	5th	
2007	Tier 4	Kolmonen (Third Division)	Section 2	Helsinki & Uusimaa (SPL Helsinki)	2nd	
2008	Tier 4	Kolmonen (Third Division)	Section 3	Helsinki & Uusimaa (SPL Helsinki)	1st	Promoted
2009	Tier 3	Kakkonen (Second Division)	Group A	Finnish FA (Suomen Pallolitto)	8th	
2010	Tier 3	Kakkonen (Second Division)	Group A	Finnish FA (Suomen Pallolitto)	2nd	
2011	Tier 3	Kakkonen (Second Division)	Group A	Finnish FA (Suomen Pallolitto)	9th	
2012	Tier 3	Kakkonen (Second Division)	Itäinen (Eastern)	Finnish FA (Suomen Pallolitto)	9th	Relegated
2013	Tier 4	Kolmonen (Third Division)	Section 2	Helsinki & Uusimaa (SPL Uusimaa)	2nd	
2014	Tier 4	Kolmonen (Third Division)	Section 2	Helsinki & Uusimaa (SPL Helsinki)	1st	Promoted
2015	Tier 3	Kakkonen (Second Division)	Itäinen (Eastern)	Finnish FA (Suomen Pallolitto)	6th	
2016	Tier 3	Kakkonen (Second Division)	Itäinen (Eastern)	Finnish FA (Suomen Pallolitto)	8th	
2017	Tier 3	Kakkonen (Second Division)	Itäinen (Eastern)	Finnish FA (Suomen Pallolitto)	6th	
2018	Tier 3	Kakkonen (Second Division)	Group B	Finnish FA (Suomen Pallolitto)	9th	
2019	Tier 3	Kakkonen (Second Division)	Group A	Finnish FA (Suomen Pallolitto)	10th	
2020	Tier 3	Kakkonen (Second Division)	Group A	Finnish FA (Suomen Pallolitto)	5th	
2021	Tier 3	Kakkonen (Second Division)	Group A	Finnish FA (Suomen Pallolitto)	6th	
2022	Tier 3	Kakkonen (Second Division)	Group A	Finnish FA (Suomen Pallolitto)	4th	
2023	Tier 3	Kakkonen (Second Division)	Group A	Finnish FA (Suomen Pallolitto)	10th	
2024	Tier 4	Kakkonen (Second Division)	Group A	Finnish FA (Suomen Pallolitto)	2nd	Promotion Playoff 2nd round
2025	Tier 4	Kakkonen (Second Division)	Group B	Finnish FA (Suomen Pallolitto)	5th	
2026	Tier 4	Kakkonen (Second Division)	Group B	Finnish FA (Suomen Pallolitto)		

- 25 seasons in Mestaruussarja
- 19 seasons in 2nd Tier
- 35 seasons in 3rd Tier
- 16 seasons in 4th Tier

=== Club structure ===
Kiffen runs 3 men's teams, 1 women's team and 4 veteran's teams.

FC Kiffen men's first team are competing in Group A of the Kakkonen. This is the fourth tier of the Finnish football system.

FC Kiffen women's first team are competing in Group A of the Kakkonen. This is the third tier of the Finnish football system.

FC Kiffen/2 are participating in the Section 3 of the Kutonen (Sixth Division).

FC Kiffen/3 are participating in the Section 1 of the Nelonen (Fourth Division).

=== Current squad ===
As of 22 July 2026

Note: Flags indicate national team as defined under FIFA eligibility rules; some limited exceptions apply. Players may hold more than one non-FIFA nationality.

No.	Pos.	Nation	Player
1	GK	UKR	Sergiy Shumilov
4	DF	FIN	Arttu Loukiainen
5	DF	FIN	Niilo Anttila
6	MF	FIN	Fesal Mohamed
7	MF	FIN	Riku Niska
8	MF	FIN	Jimi Kovalainen
9	FW	FIN	Janne Partanen
10	FW	FIN	Mauricio Hopsu
11	FW	FIN	Aki Haajanen
12	GK	FIN	Robin Källman
13	MF	FIN	Viljami Jurvanen
14	MF	FIN	Benjamin Thurling
15	FW	FIN	Joona Kyander
16	MF	FIN	Viljami Unikkolinna

No.	Pos.	Nation	Player
17	MF	FIN	Akseli Lehtojuuri
18	FW	FIN	Arthur Prince Rugumiriza
19	FW	FIN	Milan Peetumber
20	FW	FIN	Onni Puumala
21	FW	FIN	Ilmari Lappalainen
22	DF	FIN	Zakaria Osman
23	MF	FIN	Romy Nevalainen
24	MF	FIN	Rasmus Ruismäki
25	DF	KOS	Gentrit Ferati
27	DF	FIN	Tuomas Saarikko
28	DF	FIN	Arttu Mäkinen
31	DF	FIN	Anwar Abdi
32	GK	FIN	Egzon Mehmeti
37	FW	FIN	Mikko Koivumäki

=== Management ===
Updated 9 January 2021

Name	Role
(Finland) Niko Leppänen	Head coach
(Ghana) Seth Ablade	Assistant coach
(Finland) Jari Hakala	Coach
(Finland) Seppo Felt	Goalkeeping coach
(Finland) Teemu Itkonen	Kit Manager
(Finland) Raynold Dickmann	Honorary Kit Manager
(Finland) Kimmo Silventoinen	Team Manager
(Finland) Henrik Lindström	First Team Administrator
(Finland) Janne Wikman	Executive Director
(Finland) Jaakko Jokilahti	Media

== Bandy ==
The club played bandy in its early years and was the runner-up for the Finnish championship five times between 1917 and 1932.

== Ice hockey ==
Kiffen played under the name KIF in the Finnish SM-sarja for several occasions. KIF won the SM-sarja 3 times (1939, 1941 and 1943). KIF played its final SM-sarja season in 1952 and has not been playing top level ice hockey since.

== Handball ==
Kiffen has one of the most successful Handball teams in Finland. Kiffen played in the Finnish Handball League from 1969 to 2003. Kiffen's best years were during the 1970s when they were 10 times in the medals.

== References and sources ==
- Official club website
- Official football website
- Finnish Wikipedia
- Suomen Cup (archived 12 June 2010)
