= 1948 Mestaruussarja =

Mestaruussarja
- Season: 1948

The 1948 season was the 18th completed season of the Finnish Football League Championship known as the Mestaruussarja.

== Overview ==
The Mestaruussarja was administered by the Finnish Football Association and the competition's 1948 season was divided into two groups: the Palloliiton league and the Työväen Urheiluliiton league, with the leading 6 teams from each group progressing to a final group along with the 4 leading teams from the Suomensarja. After the series had been played, VPS Vaasa and TPS Turku were tied with each having 24 points. These two teams then faced each other in a match that decided the championship. VPS won the match and the championship 3–0. The six lowest placed teams in the final group were relegated to the Suomensarja.

== League standings ==
Pos	Team	Pld	W	D	L	GF	GA	GD	Pts
1	VPS Vaasa (C, Q)	15	11	2	2	41	12	+29	24
2	TPS Turku (Q)	15	11	2	2	37	18	+19	24
3	HPS Helsinki	15	9	3	3	21	13	+8	21
4	HJK Helsinki	15	6	6	3	32	20	+12	18
5	VIFK Vaasa	15	7	4	4	30	19	+11	18
6	KIF Helsinki	15	8	2	5	38	30	+8	18
7	TuWe Turku	15	6	5	4	20	25	−5	17
8	TuTo Turku	15	6	4	5	23	22	+1	16
9	KTP Kotka	15	6	4	5	24	26	−2	16
10	HIFK Helsinki	15	6	3	6	38	29	+9	15
11	RTU Rauma (R)	15	4	5	6	32	38	−6	13
12	Sudet Helsinki (R)	15	4	3	8	29	38	−9	11
13	Kullervo Helsinki (R)	15	4	1	10	19	30	−11	9
14	TuKV Turku (R)	15	2	5	8	14	27	−13	9
15	Kiri Kotka (R)	15	2	2	11	14	41	−27	6
16	Ponnistus Helsinki (R)	15	1	3	11	12	36	−24	5

Source: rsssf.com
(C) Champions; (Q) Qualified for the phase indicated; (R) Relegated

== Results ==
Home \ Away	HFK	HJK	HPS	KIF	KIR	KTP	KUL	PON	RTU	SUD	TPS	TKV	TTT	TW	VIF	VPS
HIFK		1–1				1–1			3–3	2–3				0–1		2–3
HJK			0–1		3–0		2–1			2–2		1–2		2–2		1–0
HPS	1–2			0–1	2–1			2–0			1–3	3–2				
KIF	1–5	1–4				5–0		5–0		4–1	2–5				5–1	
Kiri	1–8			1–1				1–2		4–2	1–6	4–1	0–2		0–1	
KTP		2–2	0–2		2–0		2–1		5–2	3–2		1–0	1–1			2–4
Kullervo	1–2		1–1	3–4	3–1					1–2		0–1	1–0			
Ponnistus	0–6	2–2				1–2	1–2				2–2				0–1	
RTU		0–4	1–1	3–3	5–0		0–1	2–0					4–1	1–3	3–3	
Sudet			1–2					3–2	2–3			6–2		2–3		0–6
TPS	3–2	3–1				1–0	2–0		3–1	3–2			1–2	2–0		
TuKV	0–2			0–2				0–0	2–2		1–2			1–1	2–3	0–0
TuTo	3–2	2–6	0–2	5–0				3–0		1–1		0–0			2–1	
TuWe			1–2	0–4	0–0	2–2	4–2	1–0					1–1			1–0
VIFK	7–0	1–1	0–1			2–1	2–1			0–0	1–1			6–0		1–2
VPS			0–0	2–0	3–0		6–1	4–2	7–2		2–0		2–0			

Legend: Blue = home team win; Yellow = draw; Red = away team win.
