= Jarmo Matikainen =

Finnish footballer and coach (born 1960)

Personal information
- Date of birth: 21 February 1960 (age 66)
- Place of birth: Finland
- Position: Midfielder

Senior career*
| Years | Team | Apps | (Gls) |
| 1982–1987 | Helsingin Ponnistus | | |
| 1988 | Kontulan Urheilijat | | |
| 1989–1990 | Helsingin Ponnistus | | |
| 1991 | MPS | | |
| 1992–1997 | Vuosaaren Viikingit | | |

Managerial career
- 1995–1997: Vuosaaren Viikingit
- 1998: Helsingin Ponnistus
- 2010–2014: Wales (women)
- 2017–2021: Estonia (women)
- * Club domestic league appearances and goals as of 22 March 2011

Jarmo Matikainen (born 21 February 1960) is a Finnish football coach and former player.

Matikainen made over 400 league and cup appearances in a long playing career which included a season at First division (second tier of Finnish competition) with KontU in 1988. He scored nine league goals in 1987 and 12 league goals in 1990 for Helsingin Ponnistus. Matikainen later player–coached Vuosaaren Viikingit from the fourth division to the second division (third level of Finnish league football). Matikainen also managed his first club Helsingin Ponnistus before taking a job with the Football Association of Finland in 1999.

Matikainen successfully coached the Finland U–17 and U–19 teams and was assistant coach of the senior team which reached the UEFA Women's Euro 2005 semi-final. In August 2010, it was announced that Matikainen was to take over as Wales' first ever full-time head of national teams on 4 October 2010. As well as overseeing the senior team's UEFA Women's Euro 2013 qualifying campaign, Matikainen assumed direct responsibility for the U–17 and U–19 teams. The holder of a UEFA Pro Licence, Matikainen was also tasked by the Football Association of Wales with helping to develop an overall strategy for women's football in Wales.

He announced his departure from the Wales job in January 2014, and backed the Football Association of Wales' decision to appoint Jayne Ludlow as his successor. He later managed the Estonia women's national football team from 2017 to 2021.
