= Kalevi Lehtovirta =

Finnish footballer (1928-2016)

Personal information
- Full name: Kalevi Valdemar Lehtovirta
- Date of birth: 20 February 1928
- Place of birth: Turku, Finland
- Date of death: 10 January 2016 (aged 87)
- Position: Striker

Youth career
- Maarian Kisa-Veikot

Senior career*
| Years | Team | Apps | (Gls) |
| 1946–1948 | Turun Weikot (TUL) | | (14) |
| 1948–1950 | Turun Weikot | 52 | (36) |
| 1951-1953 | Turun Pyrkivä | | (33) |
| 1953-1957 | Red Star Paris | 63 | (18) |
| 1957-1962 | Turun Palloseura | 94 | (34) |
| 1963-1964 | Turun Toverit | | (8) |
| 1965-1966 | Turun Pyrkivä | | (1) |

International career
| 1947–1959 | Finland | 44 | (13) |

Managerial career
- 1962: TPS
- * Club domestic league appearances and goals

Kalevi Valdemar Lehtovirta (20 February 1928 – 10 January 2016) was a Finnish football striker who competed in the 1952 Summer Olympics.

== Personal life ==
While in Paris he married a local woman who gave birth to their twin sons. They lived in Montmartre neighbourhood. His children and grandchildren reside in France.

== Career ==
=== Club ===
Lehtovirta started playing football in Maarian Kisa-Veikot. In 1947 he was promoted to senior squad of Turun Weikot. After 1950 season he transferred to Turun Pyrkivä where he spent 3 seasons. In 1953 he became second finnish footballer to play professionally when he moved to Red Star F.C. in French Division 2. In his second season for the club they nearly gained promotion to Ligue 1 but were not promoted due to bribery scandal between their manager and opposition goalkeeper. After 4 seasons in Paris he returned to Turku where he played for Turun Palloseura and Turun Toverit before ending his career at Turun Pyrkivä.

=== International ===
Lehtovirta earned 44 caps for Finland and scored 13 goals. He made his first appearance in 1947 in a defeat against Sweden played in Borås. His first goal was scored against Sweden in 1948. One of his most memorable moments was a winner in a friendly match against Yugoslavia in 1950.
