= Niko Ikävalko =

Finnish footballer (born 1988)

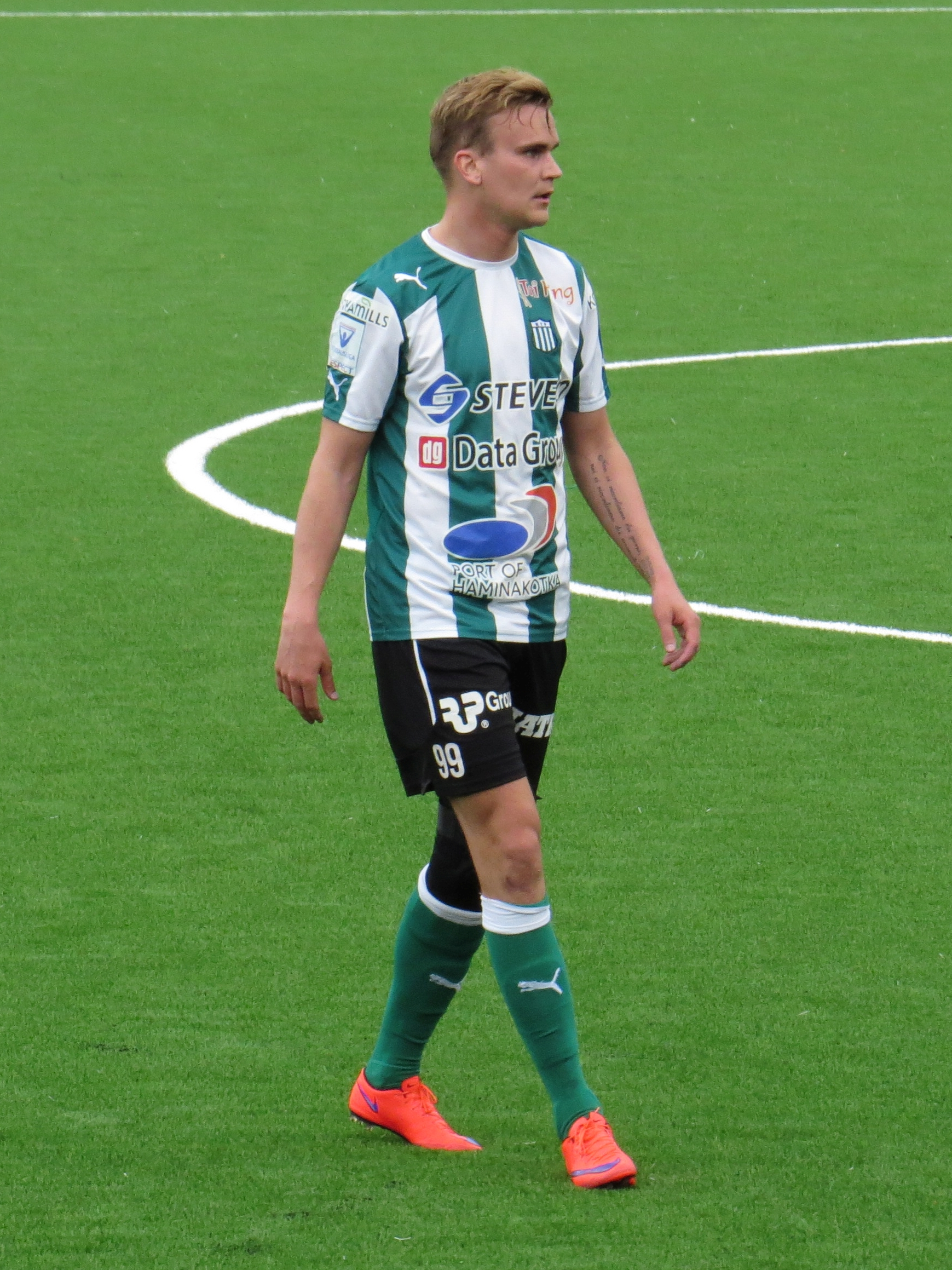
- Ikävalko with KTP in 2015

Personal information
- Full name: Niko Ikävalko
- Date of birth: 24 April 1988 (age 38)
- Place of birth: Helsinki, Finland
- Height: 1.84 m (6 ft 0 in)
- Position: Forward

Team information
- Current team: KTP (sporting director)

Youth career
- Kiri Kotka
- KTP

Senior career*
Years	Team	Apps	(Gls)
2005–2009	KooTeePee	50	(5)
2009–2010	Haka	26	(6)
2010–2011	KooTeePee	25	(5)
2011	IFK Mariehamn	8	(2)
2012–2019	KTP	106	(36)
2015	→ Sudet (loan)	1	(0)
2019	MYPA	14	(0)
2021–2022	Peli-Karhut	10	(0)

Managerial career
- 2022: Peli-Karhut
- 2022–: KTP (sporting director)
- * Club domestic league appearances and goals as of 15:01, 5 June 2019 (UTC)

Niko Ikävalko (born 24 April 1988) is a Finnish retired footballer who played as a forward. He is currently the sporting director of Ykkösliiga club Kotkan Työväen Palloilijat (KTP).

== Career ==
After retiring as a player in 2022, Ikävalko started to coach local club Peli-Karhut, the reserve team of Kotkan Työväen Palloilijat (KTP). Later in the same year, he was named a sporting director of KTP first team.

== Personal life ==
His brother Sami is a basketball player.
