= Paul Ogunkoya =

Nigerian footballer (born 2004)

Personal information
- Full name: Paul Adeniran Ogunkoya
- Date of birth: 17 September 2004 (age 22)
- Place of birth: Nigeria
- Height: 1.78 m (5 ft 10 in)
- Position: Forward

Team information
- Current team: KTP (on loan from Mahanaim)
- Number: 9

Youth career
- Mahanaim
- 2022: → Ikorodu United (loan)
- 2022: → Baník Ostrava (loan)
- 2023: → One Rocket (loan)

Senior career*
Years	Team	Apps	(Gls)
2023	→ Stabæk (loan)	0	(0)
2023	→ Stabæk 2 (loan)	3	(1)
2024	→ KuPS (loan)	9	(1)
2024	→ KuPS II (loan)	2	(0)
2026–	→ KTP (loan)	6	(1)
- * Club domestic league appearances and goals as of 1 November 2026

Paul Adeniran Ogunkoya (born 17 September 2004) is a Nigerian footballer who plays as a forward for KTP, on loan from Nigerian side Mahanaim FC.

== Club career ==
After a short loan stint with Norwegian Eliteserien side Stabæk, Ogunkoya joined Finnish Veikkausliiga club Kuopion Palloseura (KuPS) on loan for the 2024 season. He debuted with his new club on 27 January 2024, in a Finnish League Cup loss against Ilves. On 6 April 2024, Ogunkoya debuted in Veikkausliiga in a 3–1 home win against HJK Helsinki. He scored his first goal in the league on 28 July, in a 2–1 away win against Ekenäs IF (EIF).

== Personal life ==
On 24 October 2024, it was reported that Ogunkoya had been arrested as a suspect of a rape, which had allegedly taken place on 13 October in Kuopio, Finland. He was released on the following day. On 1 November, it was reported that Ogunkoya had exited Finland after his visa expired. On 26 February 2025, it was reported that no charges are filed for the incident due to lack of evidence.

== Career statistics ==
As of 21 October 2024.

Appearances and goals by club, season and competition
Club	Season	League			Cup (Note: Includes Suomen Cup)		League cup (Note: Includes Finnish League Cup)		Europe		Total	
Club	Season	Division	Apps	Goals	Apps	Goals	Apps	Goals	Apps	Goals	Apps	Goals
Stabæk (loan)	2023	Eliteserien	0	0	0	0	–		–		0	0
Stabæk 2 (loan)	2023	3. divisjon	3	1	–		–		–		3	1
KuPS (loan)	2024	Veikkausliiga	9	1	0	0	7	1	2 (Note: Appearances in UEFA Conference League)	0	18	2
KuPS Akatemia (loan)	2024	Ykkönen	2	0	–		–		–		2	0
Career total			14	2	0	0	7	1	2	0	23	3

== Honours ==
KuPS

- Veikkausliiga: 2024
- Finnish League Cup runner-up: 2024
