= Wales women's national football team =

Women's association football team representing Wales

Wales
- Nickname: The Dragons (Welsh: Y Dreigiau)
- Association: Football Association of Wales (FAW)
- Confederation: UEFA (Europe)
- Head coach: Rhian Wilkinson
- Captain: Angharad James
- Most caps: Jess Fishlock (166)
- Top scorer: Jess Fishlock (48)
- FIFA code: WAL
| First colours | Second colours |

FIFA ranking
- Current: 31 (20 October 2026)
- Highest: 29 (June–December 2018; August 2023; August 2024)
- Lowest: 57 (June 2005; May 2006)

First international
- Wales 2–3 Republic of Ireland (Llanelli, Wales; 13 May 1973)

Biggest win
- Wales 15–0 Azerbaijan (Newtown, Powys, Wales; 21 August 2010)

Biggest defeat
- Germany 12–0 Wales (Bielefeld, Germany, 31 March 1994); Wales 0–12 Germany (Swansea, Wales, 5 May 1994)

World Cup
- Appearances: 1 (first in 2035)

European Championship
- Appearances: 1 (first in 2025)
- Best result: Group stage (2025)
- Website: www.faw.cymru/en/

The Wales national women's football team (Welsh: tîm pêl-droed cenedlaethol merched Cymru) represents Wales in international football. It is controlled by the Football Association of Wales (FAW), the governing body for football in Wales and the third-oldest national football association in the world, founded in 1876 (150 years ago).

Wales qualified for their first major championship, UEFA Women's Euro 2025, in December 2024. They have never qualified for the FIFA Women's World Cup. The closest they have come was falling to Switzerland in the UEFA play-offs final for the 2023 FIFA Women's World Cup. However, they are set to potentially take part in a World Cup for the first time in 2035 when they automatically qualified as co-host with other three countries in the United Kingdom.

As a country of the United Kingdom, Wales is not a member of the International Olympic Committee and therefore the national team does not compete in the Olympic Games.

== History ==
The Wales Women's National Team was established in 1973. Their debut fixture was a match against Ireland at Stebonheath Park in Llanelli. A crowd of 3,500 watched them lose 3 - 2.

For 20 years the team was organised independently of the FAW. In 1993, players Laura McAllister, Michelle Adams and Karen Jones, succeeded in persuading the FAW secretary Alun Evans that the FAW should take over the running of the women's national team. The first international under the auspices of the FAW was on 6 September, 1993 against Iceland at the Lido Ground in Port Talbot. Iceland won 1-0.

In 2003, the FAW withdrew the team from qualifying games for UEFA Women's Euro 2005 citing the cost of travelling to Belarus, Kazakhstan, Estonia and Israel and cutbacks being needed to support Mark Hughes' men's team. The move was criticised by manager Sian Williams and player Jayne Ludlow and Wales were fined 50,000 Swiss Francs by UEFA.

In 2010, Ludlow withdrew from the squad entirely returning only in 2012 with the appointment of Jarmo Matikainen as the first ever full time manager of the women's side.

In 2018, Wales finished second in their World Cup qualifying group for the first time ever, missing out on a playoff spot due to second place team rankings. In 2020 they missed out on a playoff spot by away goals.

Under manager Gemma Grainger, Wales reached the playoffs for qualification to 2023 FIFA Women's World Cup. They beat Bosnia, but lost in extra time against Switzerland in Zurich. John Grey was temporarily placed in charge for one match in February 2024 before Rhian Wilkinson took over the reins for the Euro 2025 qualifying which began in April 2024.

On 3 December 2024, the team made history after beating the Republic of Ireland 2-1 qualifying for a first time ever to major women's tournament, the Euro 2025. Subsequently, Wales ended with three defeats at the group stage of the finals and were eliminated but not before showing that they were one of the best supported teams at their matches in Luzern and St. Gallen.

The European qualifying tournament for the 2027 FIFA Women's World Cup to determine the UEFA teams that will qualify directly for the final tournament and for the inter-confederation play-offs will take place from February to December 2026. The results from the first phase of qualification will also be used to determine the leagues for the 2027 UEFA Women's Nations League.

=== Draw ===
Wales were part of the league phase draw which took place at 13:00 CET on 4 November 2025. They were placed into group B1 alongside Czechia, Albania, and Montenegro.

=== League B ===
On June 9, Wales beat second-place Czechia in the final game to win the group. As group winner, they will be promoted to 2027 UEFA Women's Nations League A. Group winners, runners-up, and third-place teams all advance to a play-off phase.

==== Group B1 ====
| Pos | Team | Pld | W | D | L | GF | GA | GD | Pts | Promotion, qualification or relegation | (Wales) | (Czech Republic) | (Albania) | (Montenegro) |
|---|---|---|---|---|---|---|---|---|---|---|---|---|---|---|
| 1 | Wales (P) | 6 | 4 | 2 | 0 | 17 | 5 | +12 | 14 | Advance to play-offs and promotion to League A | — | 3–1 | 4–0 | 6–1 |
| 2 | Czech Republic | 6 | 3 | 2 | 1 | 18 | 8 | +10 | 11 | Advance to play-offs | 2–2 | — | 1–1 | 5–0 |
| 3 | Albania | 6 | 2 | 1 | 3 | 9 | 14 | −5 | 7 | Advance to play-offs | 0–1 | 1–5 | — | 5–2 |
| 4 | Montenegro (R) | 6 | 0 | 1 | 5 | 6 | 23 | −17 | 1 | Relegation to League C | 1–1 | 1–4 | 1–2 | — |

Source: UEFA
(P) Promoted; (R) Relegated

== Team image ==
=== Media coverage ===
Live television broadcast rights are held by BBC Cymru Wales (Welsh & English language commentary) until 2027.

=== Colours and logo ===
The primary kit has long been all-red. The crest of the Football Association of Wales features a rampant Welsh Dragon on a white shield. From 1920, the shield was surrounded by a red border, and the letters 'FAW' were added in 1926. The badge was redesigned in 1951, adding a green border with 11 daffodils, as well as the Welsh-language motto Gorau Chwarae Cyd Chwarae ("The best play is team play"). The motto was briefly removed in 1984, but the badge stayed largely the same until 2010, when the shield was changed to feature rounded sides and the motto banner was changed from white to red and green. The dragon also changed from rampant to rampant regardant. The motto was removed again in 2019, following another major redesign of the badge, which saw the top of the shield flattened and the sides changed not to curve outwards; the green border was also thinned and the daffodils removed.

=== Kit supplier ===
| Kit provider | Period |
|---|---|
| Umbro | 1996 |
| Lotto | 1996–2000 |
| Kappa | 2000–2008 |
| Champion | 2008–2010 |
| Umbro | 2010–2013 |
| Adidas | 2013–2026 |
| SUDU | 2026– |

== Results and fixtures ==
The following is a list of match results in the last 12 months, as well as any future matches that have been scheduled.

Legend

Win Draw Loss Fixture

=== 2025 ===
| 28 November Friendly | Wales | 1–1 | South Korea | Málaga, Spain |
| 19:00 CET | Ingle 6' | Report | Min-ji 68' | Stadium: Ciudad Deportiva Fundación Málaga CF; Attendance: circa 65; Referee: Caroline Lanssens (Belgium) |

| 2 December Friendly | Wales | 3–2 | Switzerland | Jerez de la Frontera, Spain |
| 12:00 CET | Ingle 15'; Cain 35'; Woodham 46' | Report | Csillag 18'; Beney 71' | Stadium: Chapín; Attendance: circa 45; Referee: Ainara Andrea Acevedo Dudle (Spain) |

=== 2026 ===
| 3 March 2027 FIFA Women's World Cup qualification | Czech Republic | 2–2 | Wales | Uherské Hradiště, Czech Republic |
| 18:30 CET | Bartoňová 16'; Žufánková 54' | Report | Cain 35'; Hughes 90+3' | Stadium: Městský fotbalový stadion Attendance: 2,358; Referee: Volha Blotskaya (Belarus) |

| 7 March 2027 FIFA Women's World Cup qualification | Wales | 6–1 | Montenegro | Llanelli, Wales |
| 16:30 GMT | Cain 6', 35'; Rowe 15'; Griffiths 17', 78'; Ingle 31' | Report | Kuč 51' | Stadium: Parc y Scarlets; Attendance: 4,550; Referee: Caroline Lanssens (Belgium) |

| 14 April 2027 FIFA Women's World Cup qualification | Wales | 4–0 | Albania | Wrexham, Wales |
| 19:15 BST | Cain 15', 55'; Hughes 35'; Roberts 48' | Report | | Stadium: Racecourse Ground; Attendance: 4,485; Referee: Katalin Sipos (Hungary) |

| 18 April 2027 FIFA Women's World Cup qualification | Albania | 0–1 | Wales | Elbasan, Albania |
| 18:00 CEST | | Report | Roberts 28' | Stadium: Elbasan Arena; Attendance: 538; Referee: Lizzy van der Helm (Netherlands) |

| 5 June 2027 FIFA Women's World Cup qualification | Montenegro | 1–1 | Wales | Podgorica, Montenegro |
| 18:00 CEST | Đoković 79' | Report | Cain 41' (pen.) | Stadium: Podgorica City Stadium; Attendance: 400; Referee: Henrikke Nervik (Norway) |

| 9 June 2027 FIFA Women's World Cup qualification | Wales | 3–1 | Czech Republic | Cardiff, Wales |
| 18:00 BST | Woodham 9'; Evans 49'; Griffiths 72' | Report | Khýrová 5' | Stadium: Cardiff City Stadium; Attendance: 5,607; Referee: Deborah Bianchi (Italy) |

| 9 October 2027 FIFA Women's World Cup play-offs | Albania | 0–1 | Wales | Shkodër, Albania |
| 18:00 CET | | Report | Franja 22' (o.g.) | Stadium: Loro Boriçi Stadium; Attendance: 642; Referee: Eleni Antoniou (Greece) |

| 13 October 2027 FIFA Women's World Cup play-offs | Wales | 3–0 | Albania | Llanelli, Wales |
| 19:15 BST | Davies 34'; Hughes 50'; Cain 62' | Report | | Stadium: Parc y Scarlets; Attendance: 4,837; Referee: Ionela Alina Pesu (Romania) |

| 1 December 2027 FIFA Women's World Cup play-offs | Wales | v | Norway | Cardiff, Wales |
| 19:15 GMT | | | | Stadium: Cardiff City Stadium |

| 5 December 2027 FIFA Women's World Cup play-offs | Norway | v | Wales | Oslo, Norway |
| 17:00 CET | | | | Stadium: Ullevaal Stadion |

== Coaching staff ==
=== Current coaching staff ===
As of 20 March 2026.

| Position | Name |
|---|---|
| Head coach | (Canada) Rhian Wilkinson |
| Assistant coaches | (England) Chris Seargant & (Wales) Gareth Davies |
| Goalkeeping coach | (United States) Diego Restrepo |
| Head of Physical performance | (New Zealand) Daniel Gordon |
| Head of Analysis | (Wales) Steffan Popham |

=== Manager history ===
- (England) Sylvia Gore (1979–1989)
- (Wales) Lyn Jones (1992-1995)
- (England) Sue Lopez (1995–1996)
- (Wales) Roy Thomas (1996–2000)
- (England) Sian Williams (2000–2003)
- (Wales) Andy Beattie (2003–2007)
- (Wales) Adrian Tucker (2007–2010)
- (Finland) Jarmo Matikainen (2010–2014)
- (Wales) Jayne Ludlow (2014–2021)
- (England) Gemma Grainger (2021–2024)
- (Wales) Jon Grey (2024)
- (Canada) Rhian Wilkinson (2024–)

== Players ==
=== Current squad ===
The following players were called up for the 2027 FIFA Women's World Cup qualification play off final matches against Norway on 1 and 5 December 2026, respectively.

Caps and goals correct as of 14 October 2026, after the second leg against Albania.

| No. | Pos. | Player | Date of birth (age) | Caps | Goals | Club |
|---|---|---|---|---|---|---|
| | GK | Olivia Clark | 30 August 2001 (age 25) | 35 | 0 | (The Football Association) Leicester City |
| 21 | GK | Safia Middleton-Patel | 21 September 2004 (age 22) | 14 | 0 | (The Football Association) Watford |
| 1 | GK | Soffia Kelly | 6 March 2007 (age 19) | 0 | 0 | (The Football Association) Aston Villa |
| 3 | DF | Gemma Evans | 1 August 1996 (age 30) | 92 | 2 | (The Football Association) Newcastle United |
| | DF | Rhiannon Roberts | 30 August 1990 (age 36) | 89 | 4 | (The Football Association) Sunderland |
| 2 | DF | Lily Woodham | 3 September 2000 (age 26) | 52 | 5 | (The Football Association) Liverpool |
| 5 | DF | Esther Morgan | 28 August 2002 (age 24) | 20 | 0 | (The Football Association) Bristol City |
| 6 | DF | Ella Powell | 1 February 2000 (age 26) | 17 | 0 | (The Football Association) Bristol City |
| 6 | DF | Mayzee Davies | 25 August 2006 (age 20) | 10 | 1 | (The Football Association) Manchester City |
| | DF | Gwen Zimmerman | 24 September 2007 (age 19) | 1 | 0 | (United States Soccer Federation) Northwestern Wildcats |
| 4 | MF | Sophie Ingle | 2 September 1991 (age 35) | 154 | 9 | (The Football Association) Bristol City |
| 8 | MF | Angharad James-Turner | 1 June 1994 (age 32) | 147 | 6 | (United States Soccer Federation) Seattle Reign |
| | MF | Hayley Ladd | 6 October 1993 (age 33) | 115 | 3 | (The Football Association) Crystal Palace |
| 13 | MF | Rachel Rowe | 13 September 1992 (age 34) | 89 | 9 | (The Football Association) Nottingham Forest |
| | MF | Ceri Holland | 12 December 1997 (age 28) | 54 | 7 | (The Football Association) Liverpool |
| 20 | MF | Carrie Jones | 4 September 2003 (age 23) | 52 | 4 | (Swedish Football Association) IFK Norrköping |
| 7 | MF | Lois Joel | 2 June 1999 (age 27) | 13 | 0 | (The Football Association) Newcastle United |
| 10 | MF | Mared Griffiths | 3 March 2007 (age 19) | 12 | 4 | (The Football Association) Manchester United |
| 17 | MF | Chloe Williams | 22 December 2000 (age 25) | 2 | 0 | (The Football Association) Wolverhampton Wanderers |
| 9 | FW | Elise Hughes | 15 April 2001 (age 25) | 43 | 7 | (The Football Association) Sunderland |
| 11 | FW | Hannah Cain | 11 February 1999 (age 27) | 30 | 12 | (The Football Association) Everton |
| 15 | FW | Mary McAteer | 2 January 2004 (age 22) | 9 | 1 | (The Football Association) Ipswich Town |
| 22 | FW | Olivia Francis | 20 February 2006 (age 20) | 2 | 0 | (The Football Association) Wolverhampton Wanderers |
| 14 | FW | Phoebie Poole | 13 May 2004 (age 22) | 2 | 0 | (The Football Association) Watford |
| 23 | FW | Tianna Teisar | 24 September 2005 (age 21) | 2 | 0 | (The Football Association) Watford |
| 19 | FW | Casi Gregson | 11 March 2007 (age 19) | 1 | 0 | (The Football Association) Newcastle United |

=== Recent call-ups ===
The following players have also been called up to the squad within the past 12 months.

| Pos. | Player | Date of birth (age) | Caps | Goals | Club | Latest call-up |
|---|---|---|---|---|---|---|
| GK | Lucy Farrell-Shrouder | 11 December 2003 (age 22) | 0 | 0 | (Wales) Wrexham | v.Albania,13 October 2026 |
| GK | Poppy Soper ^{INJ} | 4 May 2002 (age 24) | 0 | 0 | (England) Sheffield United | v. Albania, 5 October 2026 |
| GK | Poppy Lyons-Walker | 27 June 2009 (age 17) | 0 | 0 | (England) FC United of Manchester | v. Switzerland, 2 December 2025 |
| DF | Scarlett Hill^{INJ} | 9 October 2007 (age 19) | 4 | 0 | (England) Manchester United | v.Albania, 13 October 2026 |
| DF | Cadi Rodgers ^{TOP} | 29 August 2007 (age 19) | 0 | 0 | (England) Plymouth Argyle | v. Albania, 5 October 2026 |
| DF | Elena Cole ^{PRE} | 8 April 2007 (age 19) | 0 | 0 | (England) AFC Bournemouth | v. Montenegro, 5 June 2026 |
| DF | Annie Wilding | 28 February 2004 (age 22) | 0 | 0 | (England) Portsmouth | v. Albania, 18 April 2026 |
| MF | Charlie Estcourt | 27 May 1998 (age 28) | 51 | 3 | (England) Fulham | v. Albania, 5 October 2026 |
| MF | Mia Ross ^{INJ} | 28 April 2003 (age 23) | 6 | 0 | Unattached | v. Czech Republic, 9 June 2026 |
| MF | Laura Hughes ^{INJ} | 6 June 2001 (age 25) | 3 | 0 | (England) Southampton | v. Czech Republic, 9 June 2026 |
| FW | Ffion Morgan ^{INJ} | 11 May 2000 (age 26) | 56 | 2 | (England) West Ham United | v. Czech Republic, 9 June 2026 |
Notes: ^{INJ} = Withdrew due to injury; ^{PRE} = Preliminary squad / standby; ^{RET} = Retired from the national team; ^{UNV} = Unavailable for selection; ^{TOP} = Train-on player

=== Captains ===
- Jayne Ludlow (−2012)
- Jess Fishlock (2012–2015)
- Sophie Ingle (2015–2024/2026)
- Jess Fishlock (2024/2025)
- Hayley Ladd (2024/2025)
- Ceri Holland (2024/2026)
- Angharad James-Turner (2024–)
- Carrie Jones (2026)

== Records ==
As of 14 October 2026

Players in bold are still active with the national team.

=== Most appearances ===
| Rank | Player | Career | Caps | Goals |
|---|---|---|---|---|
| 1 | Jess Fishlock | 2006–2025 | 166 | 48 |
| 2 | **Sophie Ingle** | 2009–present | 154 | 9 |
| 3 | **Angharad James-Turner** | 2011–present | 147 | 6 |
| 4 | **Hayley Ladd** | 2011–present | 115 | 3 |
| 5 | Helen Ward | 2008–2023 | 105 | 44 |
| 5 | Loren Dykes | 2007–2019 | 105 | 3 |
| 7 | Natasha Harding | 2008–2022 | 103 | 26 |
| 8 | Michelle Green | 2001–2015 | 96 | 4 |
| 9 | **Gemma Evans** | 2016–present | 92 | 2 |
| 10 | Kayleigh Barton | 2012–2025 | 89 | 22 |
| 10 | **Rhiannon Roberts** | 2015–present | 89 | 2 |
| 10 | **Rachel Rowe** | 2015–present | 89 | 9 |

=== Top goalscorers ===
| Rank | Player | Career | Goals | Caps | Avg. |
|---|---|---|---|---|---|
| 1 | Jess Fishlock | 2006–2025 | 48 | 166 | 0.29 |
| 2 | Helen Ward | 2008–2023 | 44 | 105 | 0.42 |
| 3 | Natasha Harding | 2008–2022 | 26 | 103 | 0.25 |
| 4 | Kayleigh Barton | 2012–2025 | 22 | 89 | 0.25 |
| 5 | Gwennan Harries | 2006–2012 | 18 | 56 | 0.32 |
| 6 | **Hannah Cain** | 2021–present | 12 | 30 | 0.40 |
| 7 | **Sophie Ingle** | 2009–present | 9 | 154 | 0.06 |
| 7 | **Rachel Rowe** | 2015–present | 9 | 89 | 0.10 |
| 9 | **Ceri Holland** | 2021–present | 7 | 54 | 0.13 |
| 9 | **Elise Hughes** | 2019–present | 7 | 43 | 0.16 |

In April 2017, Jess Fishlock became the first player to earn 100 caps for the Wales national football team. Fishlock then became the first player to earn 150 caps for the Wales national football team in April 2024.

== Competitive record ==
=== FIFA Women's World Cup ===
| FIFA World Cup record | | | | | | | | | Qualification record | | | | | | FIFA World Cup qualification play-offs record | | | | | |
| Year | Round | Position | Pld | W | D* | L | GF | GA | Pld | W | D | L | GF | GA | Pld | W | D | L | GF | GA |
|---|---|---|---|---|---|---|---|---|---|---|---|---|---|---|---|---|---|---|---|---|
| (China) 1991 | Did not enter | | | | | | | | UEFA EURO 1991 | | | | | | | | | | | |
| (Sweden) 1995 | Did not qualify | | | | | | | | UEFA EURO 1995 | | | | | | | | | | | |
| (United States) 1999 | Did not qualify | | | | | | | | 6 | 0 | 2 | 4 | 7 | 21 | | | | | | |
| (United States) 2003 | Did not qualify | | | | | | | | 6 | 0 | 1 | 5 | 2 | 13 | | | | | | |
| (China) 2007 | Did not qualify | | | | | | | | 6 | 4 | 2 | 0 | 17 | 2 | | | | | | |
| (Germany) 2011 | Did not qualify | | | | | | | | 8 | 3 | 0 | 5 | 23 | 16 | | | | | | |
| (Canada) 2015 | Did not qualify | | | | | | | | 10 | 6 | 1 | 3 | 18 | 9 | | | | | | |
| (France) 2019 | Did not qualify | | | | | | | | 8 | 5 | 2 | 1 | 7 | 4 | | | | | | |
| (Australia) (New Zealand) 2023 | Did not qualify | | | | | | | | 10 | 6 | 2 | 2 | 22 | 5 | 2 | 1 | 0 | 1 | 2 | 2 |
| (Brazil) 2027 | Qualification in progress | | | | | | | | 6 | 4 | 2 | 0 | 17 | 5 | 2 | 2 | 0 | 0 | 4 | 0 |
| (Costa Rica) (Jamaica) (Mexico) (United States) 2031 | To be determined | | | | | | | | To be determined | | | | | | To be determined | | | | | |
| (England) (Northern Ireland) (Scotland) (Wales) 2035 | Qualified | | | | | | | | Qualified as co-host | | | | | | | | | | | |
| Total | 1/12 | - | - | - | - | - | - | - | 54 | 24 | 10 | 20 | 96 | 70 | 2 | 1 | 0 | 1 | 2 | 2 |

*Draws include knockout matches decided on penalty kicks.

=== UEFA Women's Championship ===
Wales at the UEFA Women's Championship

| UEFA Women's Championship record | | | | | | | | Qualifying record | | | | | | | |
| Year | Result | P | W | D* | L | GF | GA | P | W | D* | L | GF | GA | P/R | Rnk |
| (England) (Italy) (Norway) (Sweden) 1984 | Did not enter | | | | | | | Did not enter | | | | | | | |
| (Norway) 1987 | Did not enter | | | | | | | Did not enter | | | | | | | |
| (West Germany) 1989 | Did not enter | | | | | | | Did not enter | | | | | | | |
| (Denmark) 1991 | Did not enter | | | | | | | Did not enter | | | | | | | |
| (Italy) 1993 | Did not enter | | | | | | | Did not enter | | | | | | | |
| (England) (Germany) (Norway) (Sweden) 1995 | Did not qualify | | | | | | | 6 | 0 | 0 | 6 | 5 | 36 | – | |
| (Norway) (Sweden) 1997 | Did not qualify | | | | | | | 8 | 2 | 1 | 5 | 9 | 15 | – | |
| (Germany) 2001 | Did not qualify | | | | | | | 6 | 0 | 2 | 4 | 3 | 16 | – | |
| (England) 2005 | Withdrew | | | | | | | Withdrew | | | | | | | |
| (Finland) 2009 | Did not qualify | | | | | | | 11 | 3 | 0 | 8 | 11 | 21 | – | |
| (Sweden) 2013 | Did not qualify | | | | | | | 8 | 3 | 1 | 4 | 12 | 14 | – | |
| (Netherlands) 2017 | Did not qualify | | | | | | | 8 | 3 | 2 | 3 | 13 | 11 | – | |
| (England) 2022 | Did not qualify | | | | | | | 8 | 4 | 2 | 2 | 16 | 4 | – | |
| (Switzerland) 2025 | Group stage | 3 | 0 | 0 | 3 | 2 | 13 | 10 | 6 | 3 | 1 | 24 | 7 | ▲ (Note: From Euro 2025 onwards a new qualifying format was introduced, linked to the Women's Nations League where teams are divided into leagues with promotion/relegation between the leagues at the end of each cycle.) | 20th |
| Total | 1/14 | 3 | 0 | 0 | 3 | 2 | 13 | 65 | 21 | 11 | 33 | 93 | 124 | 20th | |

*Draws include knockout matches decided by penalty kicks.

==== European Competition for Women's Football (Unofficial) ====
1979 : Group Stage

=== UEFA Women's Nations League ===
UEFA Women's Nations League record
| League phase | | | | | | | | | | | | Finals | | | | | | | |
| Season | Lg | Grp | Pos | Pld | W | D | L | GF | GA | P/R | Rnk | Year | Pos | Pld | W | D | L | GF | GA |
|---|---|---|---|---|---|---|---|---|---|---|---|---|---|---|---|---|---|---|---|
| 2023–24 | A | 3 | 4th | 6 | 0 | 1 | 5 | 4 | 15 | ▼ | 16th | (Europe) 2024 | Did not qualify | | | | | | |
| 2025 | A | 4 | 4th | 6 | 0 | 2 | 4 | 4 | 10 | ▼ | 14th | (Europe) 2025 | Did not qualify | | | | | | |
| Total | | | | 12 | 0 | 3 | 9 | 8 | 25 | | | Total | | | | | | | |

| ▲ | Promoted at end of season |
| Same position | No movement at end of season |
| ▼ | Relegated at end of season |
| * | Participated in promotion/relegation play-offs |

=== Algarve Cup ===
The Algarve Cup is a global invitational tournament for national teams in women's soccer hosted by the Portuguese Football Federation (FPF). Held annually in the Algarve region of Portugal since 1994, it is one of the most prestigious women's football events, alongside the Women's World Cup and Women's Olympic Football.

(Portugal) Algarve Cup record
| Year | Result | Matches | Wins | Draws | Losses | GF | GA |
|---|---|---|---|---|---|---|---|
| 1994 to 2001 | did not enter | | | | | | |
| 2002 | 12th | 4 | 1 | 0 | 3 | 1 | 9 |
| 2003 | 12th | 4 | 0 | 2 | 2 | 4 | 8 |
| 2004 | 10th | 4 | 2 | 0 | 2 | 6 | 8 |
| 2005 to 2008 | did not enter | | | | | | |
| 2009 | 12th | 4 | 1 | 0 | 3 | 8 | 6 |
| 2010 | did not enter | | | | | | |
| 2011 | 8th | 4 | 2 | 0 | 2 | 6 | 7 |
| 2012 | 8th | 4 | 2 | 1 | 1 | 3 | 4 |
| 2013 | 12th | 4 | 1 | 2 | 1 | 3 | 4 |
| 2014 to 2022 | did not enter | | | | | | |
| Total | 8/26 | 28 | 9 | 5 | 14 | 31 | 47 |

=== Other tournaments ===
| Year | Result | Matches | Wins | Draws | Losses | GF | GA |
|---|---|---|---|---|---|---|---|
| 2023 Pinatar Cup | Runner-up | 3 | 1 | 2 | 0 | 2 | 1 |

== Head to head record ==
| Opponent | Pld | W | D | L | GF | GA | W% |
|---|---|---|---|---|---|---|---|
| Albania | 4 | 4 | 0 | 0 | 9 | 0 | 100 |
| Australia | 1 | 0 | 0 | 1 | 1 | 2 | 0 |
| Austria | 8 | 0 | 4 | 4 | 4 | 11 | 0 |
| Azerbaijan | 2 | 1 | 0 | 1 | 16 | 2 | 50 |
| Belarus | 6 | 4 | 1 | 1 | 12 | 7 | 67 |
| Belgium | 13 | 2 | 3 | 8 | 9 | 22 | 15 |
| Bosnia and Herzegovina | 4 | 3 | 1 | 0 | 3 | 0 | 75 |
| Bulgaria | 2 | 1 | 0 | 1 | 8 | 4 | 50 |
| Canada | 2 | 0 | 0 | 2 | 0 | 7 | 0 |
| Chile | 1 | 1 | 0 | 0 | 2 | 1 | 100 |
| China | 1 | 0 | 0 | 1 | 1 | 2 | 0 |
| Colombia | 1 | 0 | 0 | 1 | 1 | 3 | 0 |
| Costa Rica | 1 | 1 | 0 | 0 | 1 | 0 | 100 |
| Croatia | 5 | 2 | 1 | 2 | 9 | 6 | 40 |
| Czech Republic | 7 | 2 | 3 | 2 | 8 | 6 | 29 |
| Denmark | 6 | 0 | 1 | 5 | 4 | 14 | 0 |
| England | 5 | 0 | 1 | 4 | 1 | 15 | 0 |
| Estonia | 6 | 5 | 1 | 0 | 17 | 2 | 83 |
| Faroe Islands | 5 | 4 | 0 | 1 | 13 | 2 | 80 |
| Finland | 6 | 1 | 3 | 2 | 6 | 12 | 17 |
| France | 5 | 0 | 0 | 5 | 3 | 16 | 0 |
| Germany | 6 | 0 | 1 | 5 | 1 | 39 | 0 |
| Greece | 7 | 3 | 2 | 2 | 11 | 5 | 43 |
| Hungary | 4 | 2 | 1 | 1 | 5 | 2 | 50 |
| Iceland | 4 | 0 | 1 | 3 | 1 | 4 | 0 |
| Israel | 6 | 4 | 2 | 0 | 16 | 4 | 67 |
| Italy | 4 | 0 | 0 | 4 | 1 | 10 | 0 |
| Kazakhstan | 7 | 7 | 0 | 0 | 21 | 1 | 100 |
| Kosovo | 2 | 2 | 0 | 0 | 8 | 0 | 100 |
| Luxembourg | 2 | 2 | 0 | 0 | 11 | 2 | 100 |
| Mexico | 1 | 1 | 0 | 0 | 1 | 0 | 100 |
| Moldova | 2 | 2 | 0 | 0 | 6 | 0 | 100 |
| Montenegro | 4 | 3 | 1 | 0 | 14 | 2 | 75 |
| Netherlands | 5 | 0 | 0 | 5 | 1 | 13 | 0 |
| New Zealand | 3 | 1 | 1 | 1 | 1 | 2 | 33 |
| North Korea | 1 | 0 | 0 | 1 | 2 | 4 | 0 |
| North Macedonia | 1 | 1 | 0 | 0 | 6 | 0 | 100 |
| Northern Ireland | 8 | 5 | 3 | 0 | 16 | 6 | 63 |
| Norway | 5 | 0 | 0 | 5 | 0 | 11 | 0 |
| Philippines | 1 | 1 | 0 | 0 | 1 | 0 | 100 |
| Poland | 8 | 1 | 3 | 4 | 14 | 22 | 13 |
| Portugal | 17 | 5 | 6 | 6 | 15 | 21 | 29 |
| Republic of Ireland | 21 | 4 | 5 | 12 | 14 | 36 | 19 |
| Romania | 3 | 1 | 2 | 0 | 3 | 2 | 33 |
| Russia | 2 | 1 | 1 | 0 | 3 | 0 | 50 |
| Scotland | 15 | 3 | 4 | 8 | 21 | 26 | 20 |
| South Korea | 1 | 0 | 1 | 0 | 1 | 1 | 0 |
| Slovakia | 6 | 2 | 2 | 2 | 8 | 7 | 33 |
| Slovenia | 3 | 1 | 2 | 0 | 4 | 1 | 33 |
| Sweden | 4 | 0 | 2 | 2 | 3 | 11 | 0 |
| Switzerland | 8 | 1 | 1 | 6 | 10 | 18 | 13 |
| Turkey | 2 | 2 | 0 | 0 | 6 | 1 | 100 |
| Ukraine | 4 | 0 | 3 | 1 | 4 | 5 | 0 |
| United States | 1 | 0 | 0 | 1 | 0 | 2 | 0 |
| Totals | 251 | 80 | 61 | 110 | 337 | 387 | 32 |

P – Played; W – Won; D – Drawn; L – Lost
Statistics include official FIFA recognised matches only
Up to date as of 8 June 2026

== See also ==
- Sport in Wales
  - Football in Wales
    - Women's football in Wales
- List of Wales women's international footballers
- Wales women's national under-19 football team
- Wales women's national under-17 football team
- Wales national football team
- Wales national football team, the men's team
