= Aapo Ruohio =

Finnish footballer (born 2008)

Personal information
- Date of birth: 5 July 2008 (age 18)
- Place of birth: Finland
- Position: Forward

Team information
- Current team: KTP
- Number: 29

Youth career
- –2023: LauTP

Senior career*
Years	Team	Apps	(Gls)
2023–2024	LauTP	22	(10)
2023	→ Kultsu (loan)	1	(0)
2025–	KTP	10	(0)
2025	→ Haminan Pallo-Kissat (loan)	13	(4)

International career
2023	Finland U15	1	(0)
2024–	Finland U17	3	(0)
- * Club domestic league appearances and goals as of 1 November 2026

Aapo Ruohio (born 5 July 2008) is a Finnish professional footballer who plays as a forward for Ykkösliiga club KTP.

== Career ==
Ruohio grew up in Lappeenranta and played in the youth sector of Lauritsalan Työväen Palloilijat, making his senior debut with the club's men's team in 2023, aged 15, in the fifth-tier Nelonen. He also made one appearance for another local club Kultsu in Kolmonen.

After the 2024 season, Ruohio signed with Veikkausliiga club KTP. He made his league debut on 10 May, aged 16, in away match against reigning champions KuPS.

== International career ==
Ruohio is a Finnish youth international, and has represented the country in under-15 and under-17 youth national teams.
