= List of Wales women's international footballers =

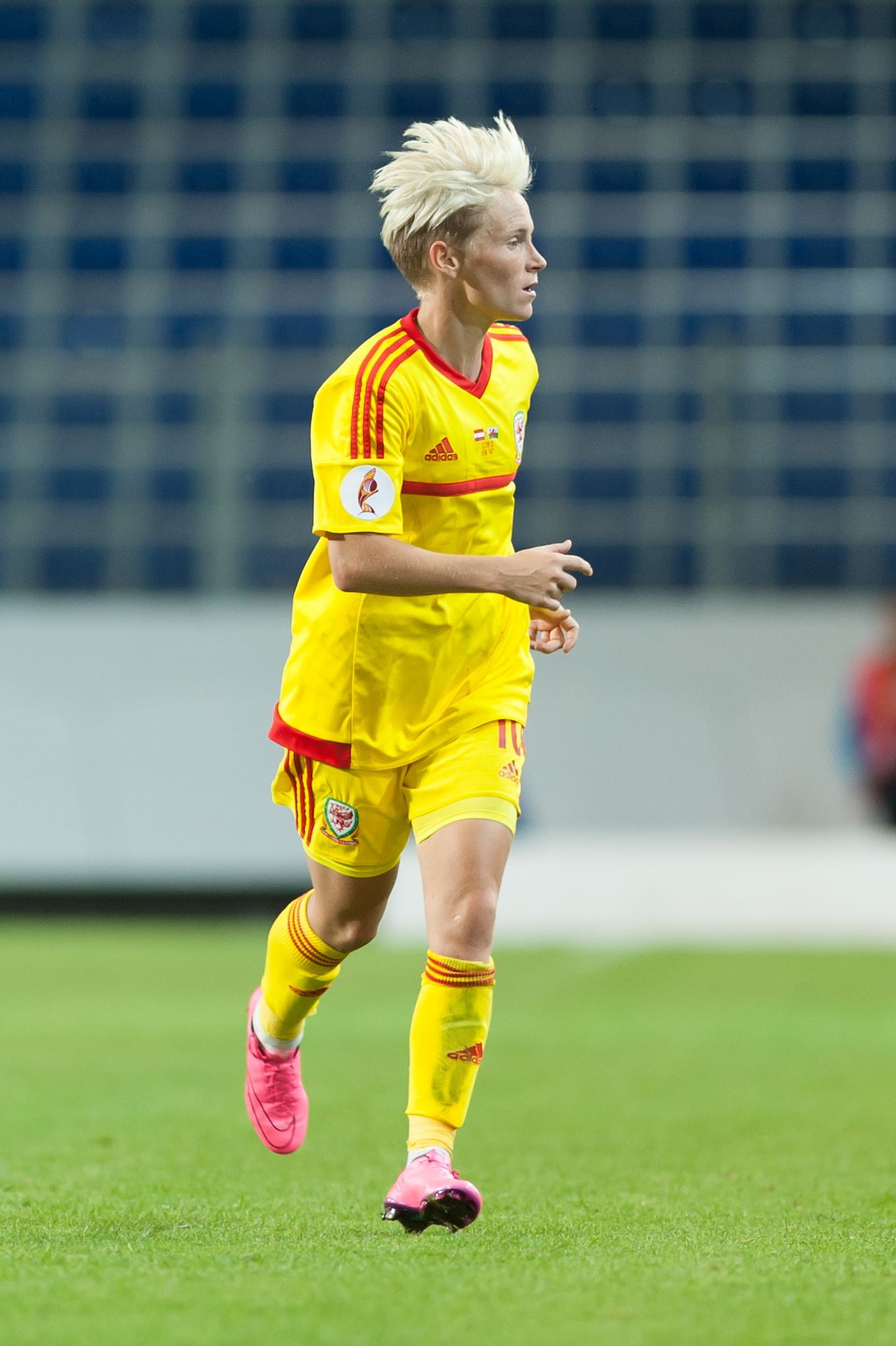
Jess Fishlock is Wales most capped player with 166 caps and all time top goal scorer with 48 goals.

The Wales national team represents the country of Wales in international association football.

All players who have played in 50 or more matches, either as a member of the starting eleven or as a substitute, are listed below. Each player's details include their playing position while with the team, the number of caps earned and goals scored in all international matches, and details of the first and most recent matches played in. The names are initially ordered by number of caps (in descending order), then by date of debut, then by alphabetical order.

== Key ==
Player
This colour background and the * symbol indicate that the player was active at club level as at the date specified above.

Positions key
| Pre-1960s | | 1960s– | |
|---|---|---|---|
| GK | Goalkeeper | | |
| FB | Full back | DF | Defender |
| HB | Half back | MF | Midfielder |
| FW | Forward | | |

Position
Playing positions are listed according to the tactical formations that were employed at the time. Thus the change in the names of defensive and midfield positions reflects the tactical evolution that occurred from the 1960s onwards.
Caps and goals
Caps and goals comprise those in the FIFA World Cup and UEFA European Championship, their associated qualification matches, as well as UEFA Nations League matches and international friendly tournaments and matches.

== Players ==
| Player | Pos. | Caps | Goals | Debut | | Last or most recent match | | Ref. |
| Player | Pos. | Caps | Goals | Date | Opponent / Venue | Date | Opponent / Venue | Ref. |
|---|---|---|---|---|---|---|---|---|
| Jess Fishlock MBE | MF | 166 | 48 | 15 March 2006 | Switzerland Stighag, Kloten | 25 October 2025 | Australia Cardiff City Stadium, Cardiff | |
| Sophie Ingle OBE* | DF/MF | 154 | 9 | 28 October 2009 | Azerbaijan Ismat Gayibov Stadium, Bakikhanov, Baku | 13 October 2026 | Albania Parc y Scarlets, Llanelli | |
| Angharad James-Turner * | MF | 147 | 6 | 27 October 2011 | Scotland Tynecastle, Gorgie, Edinburgh | 13 October 2026 | Albania Parc y Scarlets, Llanelli | |
| Hayley Ladd * | DF/MF | 115 | 3 | 15 June 2011 | New Zealand St-Germain Stadium, Saviese, Switzerland | 18 April 2026 | Albania Elbasan Arena, Elbasan, Albania | |
| Loren Dykes MBE | DF/FW | 105 | 3 | 26 August 2007 | Netherlands Kras Stadion, Volendaam | 12 November 2019 | Northern Ireland Seaview Stadium, Belfast | |
| Helen Ward | FW | 105 | 44 | 30 September 2008 | Luxembourg Stade Alphonse Theis, Hesperange | 21 February 2023 | Scotland Pinatar Arena, San Pedro del Pinatar, Spain | |
| Natasha Harding | DF/FW | 103 | 26 | 8 May 2008 | Switzerland Sportplatz z'Hof, Oberdorf, Basel-Landschaft | 6 September 2022 | Slovenia Cardiff City Stadium, Cardiff | |
| Michelle Green | MF | 96 | 4 | 27 October 2001 | Scotland Livingston | 17 September 2014 | Ukraine Arena Lviv, Lviv, Ukraine | |
| Gemma Evans * | DF | 92 | 2 | 7 June 2016 | Norway Newport Stadium, Newport, Wales | 13 October 2026 | Albania Parc y Scarlets, Llanelli | |
| Kayleigh Barton | FW | 89 | 22 | 7 March 2012 | Norway Estádio Municipal de Quarteira, Quarteira, Portugal | 13 July 2025 | England kybunpark, St. Gallen, Switzerland | |
| Rhiannon Roberts * | DF | 89 | 4 | 22 September 2015 | Austria NV Arena, Sankt Pölten, Austria | 9 June 2026 | Czech Republic Cardiff City Stadium, Cardiff | |
| Rachel Rowe * | MF | 89 | 9 | 9 March 2015 | Costa Rica Buje Stadium, Buje, Croatia | 13 October 2026 | Albania Parc y Scarlets, Llanelli | |
| Nicky Davies | GK | 64 | 0 | 3 March 2002 | Canada Estádio Capitão Josino Costa, Lagoa, Portugal | 25 August 2010 (to be confirmed) | Sweden Varendsvallen, Vaxjo (To be confirmed) | |
| Laura O'Sullivan * | GK | 59 | 0 | 2 March 2016 | Finland Athlítiko Kentro Zenon (Neo GSZ), Larnaca, Cyprus | 18 February 2023 | Iceland Pinatar Arena, San Pedro del Pinatar, Spain | |
| Gwennan Harries | FW | 56 | 18 | 26 March 2006 | Moldova Latham Park, Newtown, Wales | 15 September 2012 | Scotland Parc y Scarlets, Llanelli, Wales | |
| Ffion Morgan * | FW | 56 | 3 | 5 April 2017 | Northern Ireland Ystrad Mynach, Wales | 9 June 2026 | Czech Republic Cardiff City Stadium, Cardiff | |
| Ceri Holland * | FW | 54 | 7 | 9 April 2021 | Canada Cardiff International Sports Stadium, Cardiff, Wales | 9 June 2026 | Czech Republic Cardiff City Stadium, Cardiff | |
| Kylie Davies | DF | 51 | 0 | 28 March 2010 | Belgium Edmond Machtens Stadium, Brussels, Belgium | 23 October 2015 (To be confirmed) | Norway Color Line Stadion, Alesund, Norway (To be confirmed) | |
| Charlie Estcourt * | MF | 51 | 3 | 6 March 2015 | Bosnia and Herzegovina Rovinjsko Selo, Croatia | 14 April 2026 | Albania Racecourse Ground, Wrexham, Wales | |
| Carrie Jones * | MF | 52 | 4 | 29 August 2019 | Faroe Islands Torshavn, Faroe Islands | 13 October 2026 | Albania Parc y Scarlets, Llanelli | |
| Lily Woodham * | DF | 52 | 5 | 22 October 2020 | Faroe Islands Rodney Parade Newport, Wales | 13 October 2026 | Albania Parc y Scarlets, Llanelli | |
