= Foday Manneh =

Gambian footballer

Personal information
- Date of birth: 14 January 2000 (age 26)
- Place of birth: Gambia

Team information
- Current team: KTP
- Number: 17

Youth career
- Vejle Boldklub

Senior career*
Years	Team	Apps	(Gls)
–2018	Real de Banjul		
2018–2022	Vejle Boldklub	3	(0)
2019	→ HIFK (loan)	4	(0)
2020	→ MYPA (loan)	2	(0)
2020	→ HIFK (loan)	7	(1)
2024	PK-35	16	(1)
2025	KäPa	23	(6)
2026–	KTP	23	(4)
- * Club domestic league appearances and goals as of 1 November 2026

Foday Manneh (born 14 January 2000) is a Gambian footballer who plays as a forward for Ykkösliiga club KTP.

== Career ==
In 2018, Manneh signed for Danish second division side Vejle Boldklub, where he scored 6 goals on his debut during a 6–0 Danish Cup win over Allesø Gymnastik Forening.

Before the 2019 season, he was sent on loan to HIFK in the Finnish top flight.

Before the 2020 season, he was sent on loan to Finnish second division club MYPA.

On 31 January 2025, Manneh joined Ykkösliiga side Käpylän Pallo.

In December 2025, Manneh agreed to join Ykkösliiga side KTP, signing a one-year contract.

== Career statistics ==
As of 1 November 2026

Appearances and goals by club, season and competition
Club	Season	League			National cup (Note: Includes Danish Cup and Suomen Cup)		League cup (Note: Includes Ykkösliigacup)		Total	
Club	Season	Division	Apps	Goals	Apps	Goals	Apps	Goals	Apps	Goals
Vejle	2019–20	Danish 1st Division	2	0	1	6	–		3	6
Vejle	2020–21	Danish Superliga	0	0	0	0	–		0	0
Vejle	2021–22	Danish Superliga	1	0	0	0	–		1	0
Vejle	Total		3	0	1	6	0	0	4	6
HIFK (loan)	2019	Veikkausliiga	4	0	0	0	–		4	0
MYPA (loan)	2020	Ykkönen	2	1	0	0	–		2	1
HIFK (loan)	2020	Veikkausliiga	7	1	0	0	–		7	1
PK-35	2024	Ykkösliiga	16	1	3	1	5	0	24	2
Käpylän Pallo	2025	Ykkösliiga	25	7	2	0	3	1	30	8
KTP	2026	Ykkösliiga	23	4	0	0	5	0	28	4
Career total			80	14	6	7	8	1	99	22
