= Otto Eloluoto =

Finnish footballer (born 2008)

Personal information
- Date of birth: 10 March 2008 (age 18)
- Place of birth: Finland
- Position: Right winger

Team information
- Current team: KTP
- Number: 18

Youth career
- –2016: TPS
- 2017–: Inter Turku

Senior career*
Years	Team	Apps	(Gls)
2024–2025	Inter Turku	3	(0)
2025	Inter Turku II	19	(1)
2026–	KTP	14	(0)

International career^{‡}
2022–2023	Finland U15	10	(2)
2023	Finland U16	5	(0)
2024–	Finland U17	8	(0)
- * Club domestic league appearances and goals as of 1 November 2026 ‡ National team caps and goals as of 6 October 2024

Otto Eloluoto (born 10 March 2008) is a Finnish professional footballer who plays as a right winger for Ykkösliiga club KTP and the Finland U17 national team.

== Club career ==
Eloluoto played in the youth sector of Turun Palloseura, before joining Inter Turku in 2017. In the early 2024, Eloluoto signed his first professional contract with Inter Turku, on a two-year deal with a one-year option. On 6 October, at the age of 16, Eloluoto debuted in the top-tier Veikkausliiga with Inter, in a 1–0 away win against IFK Mariehamn. He also became the first player born in 2008 to make an appearance in Veikkausliiga.

== Career statistics ==
As of 1 July 2025

Appearances and goals by club, season and competition
Club	Season	League			National cup (Note: Includes Suomen Cup)		League cup (Note: Includes Finnish League Cup)		Europe		Total	
Club	Season	Division	Apps	Goals	Apps	Goals	Apps	Goals	Apps	Goals	Apps	Goals
Inter Turku	2024	Veikkausliiga	2	0	–		–		–		2	0
Inter Turku	2025	Veikkausliiga	1	0	2	0	6	1	–		9	1
Inter Turku	Total		3	0	2	0	6	1	0	0	11	1
Inter Turku II	2025	Ykkönen	6	0	–		–		–		6	0
Career total			9	0	2	0	6	1	0	0	17	1

== Honours ==
Inter Turku

- Finnish League Cup: 2025
