= Kiri Kotka =

Finnish sports club

Kotkan Kiri
- Full name: Kotkan Kiri
- Founded: 1935
- Manager: Parpala Eetu
- League: Kolmonen
Home colours

Kotkan Kiri is a Finnish sports club from the city of Kotka.

Club participates in gymnastics, ice hockey and association football. They were originally called Metsolan Kiri, named after Metsola district of Kotka.

== Background ==
They were formed in 1935 after internal political disputes between social democrats and communists had torn Kotkan Riento apart and left Metsola area, in which Riento had had a local section, without a sports club, Riento members from other areas in Kotka had already formed and joined other clubs, like Kotkan Työväen Palloilijat. Idea for a new club came from local shopkeeper Eino Lehtinen, who called locals for a founding meeting. Kiri joined Finnish Workers' Sports Federation after formation. Early sports included boxing, athletics, Nordic skiing, wrestling, football, swimming, and diving, in the past club also organized basketball, table tennis and bandy. Most sports have since been abandoned. In mid 1940s members build a club house which is still in use. In football club played one season in Finnish premier league after TUL and SPL leagues were merged for 1948 season. From 1948 to 1955 four different clubs from fairly small Kotka visited Finnish first tier, Kiri and Jäntevä represented Metsola district and Hovinsaari in general, while Reipas represented Kristiina district of Kotkansaari, KTP was biggest club in town and drew supporters and players throughout town, in addition Kotkan Palloseura played second-tier football throughout 1930s and played third-tier football during 1940s and 50s and Kymin Paloillijat played in second tier during late 1950s. Tough competition eventually meant that quality players were hard to find and there was not enough attendance for every club. Most local clubs slowly dropped deeper to lower division in coming decades.

== Season to season ==
Season to Season

Season	Level	Division	Section	Administration	Position	Movements
1948	Tier 1	Mestaruussarja (Premier Division)		Finnish FA (Suomen Palloliitto)	15th	Relegated
1949	Tier 2	Suomensarja (Second Division)	East Group	Finnish FA (Suomen Palloliitto)	10th	Relegated
1950	Tier 3	Suomensarja Qualifying (Third Division)	East Group	Finnish FA (Suomen Pallolitto)	7th	Qualified from TUL Leagues
1951-53		TUL Leagues		TUL (Työväen Urheiluliitto)		
1954	Tier 3	Maakuntasarja (Third Division)	East Group IV	Finnish FA (Suomen Pallolitto)	2nd	
1955	Tier 3	Maakuntasarja (Third Division)	East Group II	Finnish FA (Suomen Pallolitto)	4th	
1956	Tier 3	Maakuntasarja (Third Division)	East Group II	Finnish FA (Suomen Pallolitto)	8th	Relegated
1957	Tier 4	Aluesarja (Fourth Division)	Group 11	Finnish FA (Suomen Pallolitto)	3rd	
1958	Tier 4	Aluesarja (Fourth Division)	Group 9	Finnish FA (Suomen Pallolitto)	5th	
1959	Tier 4	Aluesarja (Fourth Division)	Group 10	Finnish FA (Suomen Pallolitto)	3rd	
1960	Tier 4	Aluesarja (Fourth Division)	Group 10	Finnish FA (Suomen Pallolitto)	2nd	
1961	Tier 4	Aluesarja (Fourth Division)	Group 8	Finnish FA (Suomen Pallolitto)	1st	Promotion Playoff
1962	Tier 4	Aluesarja (Fourth Division)	Group 8	Finnish FA (Suomen Pallolitto)	3rd	
1963	Tier 4	Aluesarja (Fourth Division)	Group 10	Finnish FA (Suomen Pallolitto)	2nd	
1964	Tier 4	Aluesarja (Fourth Division)	Group 10	Finnish FA (Suomen Pallolitto)	5th	
1965	Tier 4	Aluesarja (Fourth Division)	Group 10	Finnish FA (Suomen Pallolitto)	3rd	
1966	Tier 4	Aluesarja (Fourth Division)	Group 10	Finnish FA (Suomen Pallolitto)	3rd	
1967	Tier 4	Aluesarja (Fourth Division)	Group 10	Finnish FA (Suomen Pallolitto)	1st	Promoted
1968	Tier 3	Maakuntasarja (Third Division)	Group 5	Finnish FA (Suomen Pallolitto)	9th	
1969	Tier 3	Maakuntasarja (Third Division)	Group 5	Finnish FA (Suomen Pallolitto)	8th	Relegated
1970	Tier 4	IV Divisioona (Fourth Division)	Group 10	Finnish FA (Suomen Pallolitto)	2nd	Promotion Playoff - Promoted
1971	Tier 3	III Divisioona (Third Division)	Group 4	Finnish FA (Suomen Pallolitto)	10th	
1972	Tier 3	III Divisioona (Third Division)	Group 5	Finnish FA (Suomen Pallolitto)	9th	Relegation Group 1st - Relegation Playoff - Relegated
1973	Tier 5	IV Divisioona (Fourth Division)	Group 10	Finnish FA (Suomen Pallolitto)	2nd	
1974	Tier 5	IV Divisioona (Fourth Division)	Group 11	Finnish FA (Suomen Pallolitto)	8th	
1975	Tier 5	IV Divisioona (Fourth Division)	Group 11	Finnish FA (Suomen Pallolitto)	8th	
1976	Tier 5	IV Divisioona (Fourth Division)	Group 10	Finnish FA (Suomen Pallolitto)	6th	
1977	Tier 5	IV Divisioona (Fourth Division)	Group 11	Finnish FA (Suomen Pallolitto)	8th	
1978	Tier 5	IV Divisioona (Fourth Division)	Group 11	Finnish FA (Suomen Pallolitto)	9th	
1979	Tier 5	IV Divisioona (Fourth Division)	Group 11	Finnish FA (Suomen Pallolitto)	11th	Relegated
1980	Tier 6	Piirisarja (District League)		South-East District (SPL Kaakkois-Suomi)		Promoted
1981	Tier 5	IV Divisioona (Fourth Division)	Group 10	Finnish FA (Suomen Pallolitto)	7th	
1982	Tier 5	IV Divisioona (Fourth Division)	Group 10	Finnish FA (Suomen Pallolitto)	6th	
1983	Tier 5	IV Divisioona (Fourth Division)	Group 10	Finnish FA (Suomen Pallolitto)	5th	
1984	Tier 5	IV Divisioona (Fourth Division)	Group 10	Finnish FA (Suomen Pallolitto)	12th	Relegated
1985	Tier 6	Piirisarja (District League)		South-East District (SPL Kaakkois-Suomi)		Promoted
1986	Tier 5	IV Divisioona (Fourth Division)	Group 10	Finnish FA (Suomen Pallolitto)	11th	Relegated
1987-90	Unknown					
1991	Tier 4	III Divisioona (Third Division)	Group 6	Finnish FA (Suomen Pallolitto)	12th	Relegated
1992-95	Unknown					
1996	Tier 5	Nelonen (Fourth Division)	Group 1	South-East District (SPL Kaakkois-Suomi)	4th	
1997	Tier 5	Nelonen (Fourth Division)	Group 1	South-East District (SPL Kaakkois-Suomi)	12th	Relegated
1998-2005	Unknown					
2006	Tier 6	Vitonen (Fifth Division)	South Group	South-East District (SPL Kaakkois-Suomi)	9th	
2007	Tier 6	Vitonen (Fifth Division)	South Group	South-East District (SPL Kaakkois-Suomi)	6th	Relegation Group West 3rd
2008	Tier 6	Vitonen (Fifth Division)	West Group	South-East District (SPL Kaakkois-Suomi)	9th	
2009	Tier 6	Vitonen (Fifth Division)	South Group	South-East District (SPL Kaakkois-Suomi)	6th	
2010	Tier 6	Vitonen (Fifth Division)	South Group	South-East District (SPL Kaakkois-Suomi)	1st	Promoted
2011	Tier 5	Nelonen (Fourth Division)		South-East District (SPL Kaakkois-Suomi)	10th	
2012	Tier 5	Nelonen (Fourth Division)		South-East District (SPL Kaakkois-Suomi)	9th	
2013	Tier 5	Nelonen (Fourth Division)		South-East District (SPL Kaakkois-Suomi)	8th	
2014	Tier 5	Nelonen (Fourth Division)		South-East District (SPL Kaakkois-Suomi)	5th	
2015	Tier 7	Kutonen (Sixth Division)	South Group	South-East District (SPL Kaakkois-Suomi)	3rd	
2016	Tier 7	Kutonen (Sixth Division)	South Group	South-East District (SPL Kaakkois-Suomi)	2nd	Promoted
2017	Tier 6	Vitonen (Fifth Division)	West Group	South-East District (SPL Kaakkois-Suomi)	5th	
2018	Tier 6	Vitonen (Fifth Division)	West Group	South-East District (SPL Kaakkois-Suomi)	2nd	
2019	Tier 6	Vitonen (Fifth Division)	West Group	South-East District (SPL Kaakkois-Suomi)	1st	Promoted

- 1 seasons in Mestaruussarja
- 1 seasons in Suomensarja
- 8 seasons in Maakuntasarja
- 13 seasons in Kolmonen
- 18 seasons in Nelonen
- 10 seasons in Vitonen
- 2 season in Kutonen

== Official homepage ==
- (in Finnish)
