= RTU Rauma =

Finnish sports club

Rauman Työväen Urheilijat (abbreviated RTU) is a sports club from Rauma in Finland. The club was formed in 1929. They participate in orienteering, floorball and athletics.

== Background ==
RTU was founded in 1929 when local social democratic workers association formed the club. In 1952, the club reached its highest membership count to date, with 1317 members. RTU is the only club from Rauma to play top-tier football in Finland, they were also the first club from Satakunta to play in premier division.

== Season to season in football ==
Season	Level	Division	Section	Administration	Position	Movements
1948	Tier 1	Mestaruussarja (Premier League)		Finnish FA (Suomen Pallolitto)	11th	Relegated
1949	Tier 2	Suomensarja (Second Division)	West Group	Finnish FA (Suomen Pallolitto)	10th	Relegated
1950-55		TUL Competitions		TUL (Työväen Urheiluliitto)		
1956	Tier 4	Aluesarja (Fourth Division)	Group 6	Finnish FA (Suomen Pallolitto)	2nd	
1957	Tier 4	Aluesarja (Fourth Division)	Group 5	Finnish FA (Suomen Pallolitto)	1st	Promoted
1958	Tier 3	Maakuntasarja (Third Division)	Group 4	Finnish FA (Suomen Pallolitto)	8th	Relegated
1959	Tier 4	Aluesarja (Fourth Division)	Group 6	Finnish FA (Suomen Pallolitto)	3rd	
1960	Tier 4	Aluesarja (Fourth Division)	Group 7	Finnish FA (Suomen Pallolitto)	2nd	
1961	Tier 4	Aluesarja (Fourth Division)	Group 11	Finnish FA (Suomen Pallolitto)	1st	Promoted
1962	Tier 3	Maakuntasarja (Third Division)	Group 6	Finnish FA (Suomen Pallolitto)	6th	
1963	Tier 3	Maakuntasarja (Third Division)	Group 3	Finnish FA (Suomen Pallolitto)	6th	
1964	Tier 3	Maakuntasarja (Third Division)	Group 4	Finnish FA (Suomen Pallolitto)	8th	Relegated
1965	Tier 4	Aluesarja (Fourth Division)	Group 6	Finnish FA (Suomen Pallolitto)	3rd	
1966	Tier 4	Aluesarja (Fourth Division)	Group 6	Finnish FA (Suomen Pallolitto)	6th	
1967	Tier 4	Aluesarja (Fourth Division)	Group 6	Finnish FA (Suomen Pallolitto)	2nd	
1968	Tier 4	Aluesarja (Fourth Division)	Group 6	Finnish FA (Suomen Pallolitto)	2nd	
1969	Tier 4	Aluesarja (Fourth Division)	Group 6	Finnish FA (Suomen Pallolitto)	2nd	
1970	Tier 4	IV Divisioona (Fourth Division)	Group 6	Finnish FA (Suomen Pallolitto)	3rd	
1971	Tier 4	IV Divisioona (Fourth Division)	Group 4	Finnish FA (Suomen Pallolitto)	1st	Promoted
1972	Tier 3	III Divisioona (Third Division)	Group 3	Finnish FA (Suomen Pallolitto)	3rd	
1973	Tier 4	III Divisioona (Third Division)	Group 4	Finnish FA (Suomen Pallolitto)	3rd	
1974	Tier 4	III Divisioona (Third Division)	Group 4	Finnish FA (Suomen Pallolitto)	4th	
1975	Tier 4	III Divisioona (Third Division)	Group 4	Finnish FA (Suomen Pallolitto)	3rd	
1976	Tier 4	III Divisioona (Third Division)	Group 4	Finnish FA (Suomen Pallolitto)	3rd	
1977	Tier 4	III Divisioona (Third Division)	Group 4	Finnish FA (Suomen Pallolitto)	10th	Relegated
1978	Tier 5	IV Divisioona (Fourth Division)	Group 7	Finnish FA (Suomen Pallolitto)	4th	
1979	Tier 5	IV Divisioona (Fourth Division)	Group 7	Finnish FA (Suomen Pallolitto)	3rd	Promotion Playoff
1980	Tier 5	IV Divisioona (Fourth Division)	Group 7	Finnish FA (Suomen Pallolitto)	4th	
1981	Tier 5	IV Divisioona (Fourth Division)	Group 6	Finnish FA (Suomen Pallolitto)	8th	
1982	Tier 5	IV Divisioona (Fourth Division)	Group 6	Finnish FA (Suomen Pallolitto)	4th	
1983	Tier 5	IV Divisioona (Fourth Division)	Group 6	Finnish FA (Suomen Pallolitto)	7th	
1984	Tier 5	IV Divisioona (Fourth Division)	Group 6	Finnish FA (Suomen Pallolitto)	4th	
1985	Tier 5	IV Divisioona (Fourth Division)	Group 6	Finnish FA (Suomen Pallolitto)	8th	
1986	Tier 5	IV Divisioona (Fourth Division)	Group 6	Finnish FA (Suomen Pallolitto)	1st	Promoted
1987	Tier 4	III Divisioona (Third Division)	Group 4	Finnish FA (Suomen Pallolitto)	6th	
1988	Tier 4	III Divisioona (Third Division)	Group 4	Finnish FA (Suomen Pallolitto)	11th	Relegated

- 1 season in Mestaruussarja
- 1 seasons in Suomensarja
- 5 seasons in Maakuntasarja
- 19 seasons in III Divisioona
- 9 seasons in IV Divisioona
