= Helsingin Ponnistus =

Finnish football club

- Full name: Helsingin Ponnistus
- Nicknames: Ponnistus, Ponnarit, Telakka(the dock), Ponteva(vigorous)
- Founded: 1887; 139 years ago
- Ground: Haapaniemen Kenttä, Helsinki, Finland
- Chairman: Jukka Haapaniemi
- Coach: Sami Koskinen (Finland) Saku Härkönen
- League: Nelonen
Home colours	Away colours

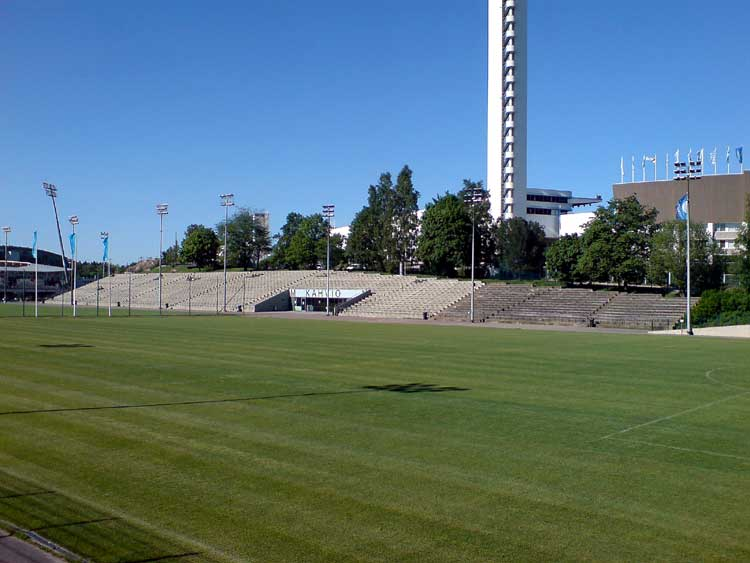
Töölön Pallokenttä

Helsingin Ponnistus (abbreviated Ponnistus) is a football club from Helsinki, Finland. The club was formed in 1887 making it the oldest football club in Finland. The men's first team currently plays in the Nelonen (Fourth Division) and their home ground is at the Haapaniemen Kenttä.

== Background ==
The sports club was founded on 6 September 1887 by Viktor Damm (1864–1944) supported by 5 other young men. In its early days the club specialised in gymnastics and athletics. Nowadays football is the main sport.

The club has also been playing bandy. It was the runner-up for the bandy championship of the Finnish Workers' Sports Federation in 1948.

Ponnistus have had a variable degree of success in the Finnish football league and have participated in all four top tiers of Finnish football since the war years. The club have played in the Mestaruussarja, which was then the top tier of Finnish football on 4 separate occasions in 1948, 1968, 1973 and as recently as 1995 in the Veikkausliiga. Each time their stay was short-lived and they were relegated back to the second tier at the end of the season.

Ponnistus have played 28 seasons covering seven periods in the Ykkönen or Suomensarja (First Division), the second tier of Finnish football in the years 1949–55, 1958–63, 1965–67, 1969–72, 1974–77, 1993–94 and 1996–97. They also have had four spells covering 21 seasons in the third tier, the Kakkonen (Second Division), in 1978–83, 1985–92, 1998–2002 and 2005–06.

In 1995, Ponnistus won the final of Työväen Urheiluliiton Cup (Workers' Sports Federation Cup) for the first time in their history.

The highest ever attendance for a Ponnistus match was in 1968 when 6,281 people attended the home game with Lahden Reipas.

The Ladies Team gained promotion to the Women's Premier Division (Naisten SM-sarja) in 1976 but in 1977 they finished bottom of their group and were relegated. The team currently play in the Nelonen (Fourth Division).

== Season to season ==
Season	Level	Division	Section	Administration	Position	Movements
1948	Tier 1	Mestaruussarja (Premier League)		Finnish FA (Suomen Pallolitto)	16th	Relegated
1949	Tier 2	Suomensarja (Second Division)	East Group	Finnish FA (Suomen Pallolitto)	2nd	
1950	Tier 2	Suomensarja (Second Division)	East Group	Finnish FA (Suomen Pallolitto)	8th	
1951	Tier 2	Suomensarja (Second Division)	East Group	Finnish FA (Suomen Pallolitto)	8th	
1952	Tier 2	Suomensarja (Second Division)	East Group	Finnish FA (Suomen Pallolitto)	2nd	
1953	Tier 2	Suomensarja (Second Division)	East Group	Finnish FA (Suomen Pallolitto)	8th	
1954	Tier 2	Suomensarja (Second Division)	East Group	Finnish FA (Suomen Pallolitto)	6th	
1955	Tier 2	Suomensarja (Second Division)	East Group	Finnish FA (Suomen Pallolitto)	9th	Relegated
1956	Tier 3	Maakuntasarja (Third Division)	South Group 2	Finnish FA (Suomen Pallolitto)	1st	Promotion Playoff
1957	Tier 3	Maakuntasarja (Third Division)	South Group 1	Finnish FA (Suomen Pallolitto)	1st	Promoted
1958	Tier 2	Suomensarja (Second Division)	South Group	Finnish FA (Suomen Pallolitto)	7th	
1959	Tier 2	Suomensarja (Second Division)	South Group	Finnish FA (Suomen Pallolitto)	9th	
1960	Tier 2	Suomensarja (Second Division)	South Group	Finnish FA (Suomen Pallolitto)	6th	
1961	Tier 2	Suomensarja (Second Division)	East Group	Finnish FA (Suomen Pallolitto)	3rd	
1962	Tier 2	Suomensarja (Second Division)	East Group	Finnish FA (Suomen Pallolitto)	7th	
1963	Tier 2	Suomensarja (Second Division)	East Group	Finnish FA (Suomen Pallolitto)	11th	Relegated
1964	Tier 3	Maakuntasarja (Third Division)	Group 1 – Helsinki & Uusimaa	Finnish FA (Suomen Pallolitto)	1st	Promoted
1965	Tier 2	Suomensarja (Second Division)	East Group	Finnish FA (Suomen Pallolitto)	9th	Relegation Playoff
1966	Tier 2	Suomensarja (Second Division)	East Group	Finnish FA (Suomen Pallolitto)	6th	
1967	Tier 2	Suomensarja (Second Division)	East Group	Finnish FA (Suomen Pallolitto)	1st	Promotion Group 2nd – Promoted
1968	Tier 1	Mestaruussarja (Premier League)		Finnish FA (Suomen Pallolitto)	11th	Relegated
1969	Tier 2	Suomensarja (Second Division)	South Group	Finnish FA (Suomen Pallolitto)	1st	Promotion Group 3rd
1970	Tier 2	II Divisioona (Second Division)	East Group	Finnish FA (Suomen Pallolitto)	2nd	Promotion Group 2nd
1971	Tier 2	II Divisioona (Second Division)	East Group	Finnish FA (Suomen Pallolitto)	1st	Promotion Group 3rd
1972	Tier 2	II Divisioona (Second Division)	East Group	Finnish FA (Suomen Pallolitto)	1st	Promoted
1973	Tier 1	Mestaruussarja (Premier League)		Finnish FA (Suomen Pallolitto)	11th	Relegated
1974	Tier 2	I Divisioona (First Division)		Finnish FA (Suomen Pallolitto)	7th	
1975	Tier 2	I Divisioona (First Division)		Finnish FA (Suomen Pallolitto)	4th	
1976	Tier 2	I Divisioona (First Division)		Finnish FA (Suomen Pallolitto)	6th	
1977	Tier 2	I Divisioona (First Division)		Finnish FA (Suomen Pallolitto)	12th	Relegated
1978	Tier 3	II Divisioona (Second Division)	East Group	Finnish FA (Suomen Pallolitto)	8th	
1979	Tier 3	II Divisioona (Second Division)	East Group	Finnish FA (Suomen Pallolitto)	4th	
1980	Tier 3	II Divisioona (Second Division)	East Group	Finnish FA (Suomen Pallolitto)	3rd	
1981	Tier 3	II Divisioona (Second Division)	East Group	Finnish FA (Suomen Pallolitto)	1st	Promotion Playoff
1982	Tier 3	II Divisioona (Second Division)	East Group	Finnish FA (Suomen Pallolitto)	8th	
1983	Tier 3	II Divisioona (Second Division)	East Group	Finnish FA (Suomen Pallolitto)	12th	Relegated
1984	Tier 4	III Divisioona (Third Division)	Group 1 – Helsinki & Uusimaa	Finnish FA (Suomen Pallolitto)	2nd	Promotion Playoff – Promoted
1985	Tier 3	II Divisioona (Second Division)	West Group	Finnish FA (Suomen Pallolitto)	8th	
1986	Tier 3	II Divisioona (Second Division)	East Group	Finnish FA (Suomen Pallolitto)	8th	
1987	Tier 3	II Divisioona (Second Division)	East Group	Finnish FA (Suomen Pallolitto)	6th	
1988	Tier 3	II Divisioona (Second Division)	East Group	Finnish FA (Suomen Pallolitto)	2nd	
1989	Tier 3	II Divisioona (Second Division)	East Group	Finnish FA (Suomen Pallolitto)	7th	
1990	Tier 3	II Divisioona (Second Division)	East Group	Finnish FA (Suomen Pallolitto)	4th	
1991	Tier 3	II Divisioona (Second Division)	East Group	Finnish FA (Suomen Pallolitto)	2nd	
1992	Tier 3	II Divisioona (Second Division)	East Group	Finnish FA (Suomen Pallolitto)	1st	Promoted
1993	Tier 2	I Divisioona (First Division)		Finnish FA (Suomen Pallolitto)	7th	Relegation series 1st
1994	Tier 2	Ykkönen (First Division)		Finnish FA (Suomen Pallolitto)	1st	Promoted
1995	Tier 1	Veikkausliiga (Premier League)		Finnish FA (Suomen Pallolitto)	14th	Relegated
1996	Tier 2	Ykkönen (First Division)	South Group	Finnish FA (Suomen Pallolitto)	7th	
1997	Tier 2	Ykkönen (First Division)	South Group	Finnish FA (Suomen Pallolitto)	10th	Relegation Group South – Relegated
1998	Tier 3	Kakkonen (Second Division)	East Group	Finnish FA (Suomen Pallolitto)	8th	
1999	Tier 3	Kakkonen (Second Division)	East Group	Finnish FA (Suomen Pallolitto)	9th	
2000	Tier 3	Kakkonen (Second Division)	West Group	Finnish FA (Suomen Pallolitto)	4th	
2001	Tier 3	Kakkonen (Second Division)	South Group	Finnish FA (Suomen Pallolitto)	2nd	
2002	Tier 3	Kakkonen (Second Division)	South Group	Finnish FA (Suomen Pallolitto)	11th	Relegated
2003	Tier 4	Kolmonen (Third Division)	Section 3	Helsinki & Uusimaa (SPL Helsinki)	3rd	
2004	Tier 4	Kolmonen (Third Division)	Section 2	Helsinki & Uusimaa (SPL Uusimaa)	1st	Promotion Playoffs – Promoted
2005	Tier 3	Kakkonen (Second Division)	South Group	Finnish FA (Suomen Pallolitto)	10th	Relegation Playoffs
2006	Tier 3	Kakkonen (Second Division)	Group A	Finnish FA (Suomen Pallolitto)	14th	Relegated
2007	Tier 4	Kolmonen (Third Division)	Section 3	Helsinki & Uusimaa (SPL Uusimaa)	6th	
2008	Tier 4	Kolmonen (Third Division)	Section 2	Helsinki & Uusimaa (SPL Uusimaa)	3rd	
2009	Tier 4	Kolmonen (Third Division)	Section 1	Helsinki & Uusimaa (SPL Uusimaa)	4th	
2010	Tier 4	Kolmonen (Third Division)	Section 2	Helsinki & Uusimaa (SPL Helsinki)	11th	Relegated
2011	Tier 5	Nelonen (Fourth Division)	Section 1	Helsinki District (SPL Helsinki)	1st	Promoted
2012	Tier 4	Kolmonen (Third Division)	Section 2	Helsinki & Uusimaa (SPL Uusimaa)	12th	Relegated
2013	Tier 5	Nelonen (Fourth Division)	Section 2	Helsinki District (SPL Helsinki)	7th	
2014	Tier 5	Nelonen (Fourth Division)	Section 1	Helsinki District (SPL Helsinki)	5th	
2015	Tier 5	Nelonen (Fourth Division)	Group 2	Helsinki District (SPL Helsinki)	4th	
2016	Tier 5	Nelonen (Fourth Division)	Group 1	Helsinki District (SPL Helsinki)	8th	
2017	Tier 5	Nelonen (Fourth Division)	Group 1	Helsinki District (SPL Helsinki)	12th	Relegated
2018	Tier 6	Vitonen (Fifth Division)	Group 1	Helsinki District (SPL Helsinki)	6th	
2019	Tier 6	Vitonen (Fifth Division)	Group 4	Helsinki District (SPL Helsinki)	3rd	
2020	Tier 6	Vitonen (Fifth Division)	Group 4	South (SPL Etelä)	1st	Promoted
2021	Tier 5	Nelonen (Fourth Division)	Group 3	South (SPL Etelä)	5th	

- 4 season in Veikkausliiga/Mestaruussarja
- 28 seasons in Ykkönen
- 24 seasons in Kakkonen
- 8 seasons in Kolmonen
- 7 seasons in Nelonen
- 3 seasons in Vitonen

== 2010 season ==
Ponnistus Men's Team are competing in Section 2 (Lohko 2) of the Kolmonen (Third Division) administered by the Helsinki SPL. This is the fourth highest tier in the Finnish football system. In 2009 Ponnistus finished in 4th place in Section 1 (Lohko 1) of the Kolmonen.

Ponnistus / 2 are competing in Section 2 (Lohko 2) of the Vitonen (Fifth Division) administered by the Helsinki SPL.

== References and Sources ==
- Official Website
- Finnish Wikipedia
- Suomen Cup
- Helsingin Ponnistus Facebook
