= TuKV Turku =

Finnish sports club

TuKV
- Full name: Turun Kisa-Veikot
- Founded: 1930
- Chairman: Matti Rautee
- League: Miesten Kutonen
- Website: https://www.turunkisaveikot.fi/

Turun Kisa-Veikot (TuKV for short) is a sports club from Turku, Finland. The club was founded in the then-independent municipality, Maaria, area where they still operate and own a club house. It was established in 1930 as Maarian Kisa-Veikot. Football was played since the formation of the club, other sections include futsal, ice hockey, roller hockey, badminton and capoeira, they also run amateur theatre. The club is a member of the Finnish Workers' Sports Federation, abbreviated as TUL.

== Football ==
Football was part of clubs sports since foundation. They played in Finnish workers sports federation first level in 1938, 1939 and 1940 seasons. In 1943-44 Season they were qualified to Mestaruussarja but withdrew together with other TUL club Tampereen Pallo-Veikot before last round, this was the first season when Finnish FA and TUL clubs played in the same premiership. After WWII they played in the second level of TUL Leagues and were qualified for 1948 mestaruussarja. Between 1950 and 1953 they played in TUL competitions and when lower levels were also unified with Finnish FA in 1954 they started from third tier Maakuntasarja. In 2019 season their first team plays in sixth tier, Vitonen.

TuKV Kit
TuKV Kit 1959

=== Season to Season ===
Season to Season

Season	Level	Division	Section	Administration	Position	Movements
1943-44	Tier 1	Mestaruussarja (Premier League)		Finnish FA (Suomen Palloliitto)		Withdrew before last round
1948	Tier 1	Mestaruussarja (Premier League)		Finnish FA (Suomen Palloliitto)	14th	Relegated
1949	Tier 2	Suomensarja (Second Division)	West Group	Finnish FA (Suomen Pallolitto)	11th	Relegated
1950-53		TUL Competitions		TUL (Työväen Urheiluliitto)		
1954	Tier 3	Maakuntasarja (Third Division)	West Group II	Finnish FA (Suomen Pallolitto)	4th	
1955	Unknown					
1956	Tier 3	Maakuntasarja (Third Division)	West Group II	Finnish FA (Suomen Pallolitto)	2nd	
1957	Tier 3	Maakuntasarja (Third Division)	West Group I	Finnish FA (Suomen Pallolitto)	3rd	
1958	Tier 3	Maakuntasarja (Third Division)	Group 3	Finnish FA (Suomen Pallolitto)	1st	Promoted
1959	Tier 2	Suomensarja (Second Division)	West Group	Finnish FA (Suomen Pallolitto)	6th	
1960	Tier 2	Suomensarja (Second Division)	South Group	Finnish FA (Suomen Pallolitto)	10th	Relegated
1961	Tier 3	Maakuntasarja (Third Division)	Group 2	Finnish FA (Suomen Pallolitto)	2nd	
1962	Tier 3	Maakuntasarja (Third Division)	Group 2	Finnish FA (Suomen Pallolitto)	5th	
1963	Tier 3	Maakuntasarja (Third Division)	Group 2	Finnish FA (Suomen Pallolitto)	6th	Relegation Playoff - Relegated
1964	Tier 4	Aluesarja (Fourth Division)	Group 5	Finnish FA (Suomen Pallolitto)	1st	Promoted
1965	Tier 3	Maakuntasarja (Third Division)	Group 3	Finnish FA (Suomen Pallolitto)	5th	
1966	Tier 3	Maakuntasarja (Third Division)	Group 4	Finnish FA (Suomen Pallolitto)	2nd	Promotion Playoff - Promoted
1967	Tier 2	Suomensarja (Second Division)	West Group	Finnish FA (Suomen Pallolitto)	12th	Relegated
1968	Tier 3	Maakuntasarja (Third Division)	Group 3	Finnish FA (Suomen Pallolitto)	10th	Relegated
1969	Tier 4	Aluesarja (Fourth Division)	Group 5	Finnish FA (Suomen Pallolitto)	1st	Promoted
1970	Tier 3	III Divisioona (Third Division)	Group 3	Finnish FA (Suomen Pallolitto)	10th	Relegated
1971	Tier 4	IV Divisioona (Fourth Division)	Group 3	Finnish FA (Suomen Pallolitto)	6th	
1972	Tier 4	IV Divisioona (Fourth Division)	Group 4	Finnish FA (Suomen Pallolitto)	5th	
1973	Tier 5	IV Divisioona (Fourth Division)	Group 4	Finnish FA (Suomen Pallolitto)	5th	
1974	Tier 5	IV Divisioona (Fourth Division)	Group 5	Finnish FA (Suomen Pallolitto)	6th	
1975	Tier 5	IV Divisioona (Fourth Division)	Group 6	Finnish FA (Suomen Pallolitto)	1st	Promoted
1976	Tier 4	III Divisioona (Third Division)	Group 3	Finnish FA (Suomen Pallolitto)	6th	
1977	Tier 4	III Divisioona (Third Division)	Group 3	Finnish FA (Suomen Pallolitto)	10th	Relegated
1978	Tier 5	IV Divisioona (Fourth Division)	Group 5	Finnish FA (Suomen Pallolitto)	9th	Relegated
1979	Tier 6	Piirinsarja (District League)		Turku District (SPL Turku)		
1980	Tier 6	Piirinsarja (District League)		Turku District (SPL Turku)		Promoted
1981	Tier 5	IV Divisioona (Fourth Division)	Group 5	Finnish FA (Suomen Pallolitto)	10th	Relegated
1982-84	Unknown					
1985	Tier 5	IV Divisioona (Fourth Division)	Group 5	Finnish FA (Suomen Pallolitto)	5th	
1986	Tier 5	IV Divisioona (Fourth Division)	Group 4	Finnish FA (Suomen Pallolitto)	10th	Relegation Playoff - Relegated
1987-88	Unknown					
1989	Tier 5	IV Divisioona (Fourth Division)	Group 4	Turku District (SPL Turku)	9th	
1990-93	Unknown					
1994	Tier 5	Nelonen (Fourth Division)	Group 4	Turku District (SPL Turku)	9th	
1995-96	Unknown					
1997	Tier 5	Nelonen (Fourth Division)		Turku District (SPL Turku)	7th	
1998	Tier 5	Nelonen (Fourth Division)		Turku District (SPL Turku)	5th	
1999	Unknown					
2000	Tier 5	Nelonen (Fourth Division)	Group 2	Turku District (SPL Turku)		Relegation Group 2nd
2001	Tier 5	Nelonen (Fourth Division)	Group 1	Turku District (SPL Turku)	11th	Relegation Group 1st
2002	Tier 5	Nelonen (Fourth Division)	Group 2	Turku District (SPL Turku)	6th	Promotion Group 11th
2003	Tier 5	Nelonen (Fourth Division)	Group 1	Turku District (SPL Turku)	8th	Relegation Group 10th - Relegated
2004	Tier 6	Vitonen (Fifth Division)	Group 1	Turku District (SPL Turku)	3rd	Promotion Group 9th
2005	Tier 6	Vitonen (Fifth Division)	Upper Group	Turku District (SPL Turku)	9th	Promotion Group 12th
2006	Tier 6	Vitonen (Fifth Division)	Lower Group	Turku District (SPL Turku)	5th	Relegation Group 3rd
2007	Tier 6	Vitonen (Fifth Division)	Upper Group	Turku District (SPL Turku)	11th	Relegation Group 4th
2008	Tier 6	Vitonen (Fifth Division)	Lower Group	Turku District (SPL Turku)	6th	Relegation Group 10th
2009	Tier 6	Vitonen (Fifth Division)	Lower Group	Turku District (SPL Turku)	4th	Relegation Group 6th
2010	Tier 6	Vitonen (Fifth Division)	Lower Group	Turku District (SPL Turku)	7th	Relegation Group 6th
2011	Tier 6	Vitonen (Fifth Division)	Group 1	Turku District (SPL Turku)	7th	
2012	Tier 6	Vitonen (Fifth Division)	Group 2	Turku District (SPL Turku)	6th	
2013	Tier 6	Vitonen (Fifth Division)	Group 1	Turku District (SPL Turku)	6th	
2014	Tier 6	Vitonen (Fifth Division)	Group 1	Turku District (SPL Turku)	6th	
2015	Tier 6	Vitonen (Fifth Division)	Group 1	Turku District (SPL Turku)	10th	
2016	Tier 6	Vitonen (Fifth Division)	Group 1	Turku District (SPL Turku)	12th	Relegated
2017	Tier 7	Kutonen (Sixth Division)	Group 1	Western District (SPL Länsi-Suomi)	1st	Promoted
2018	Tier 6	Vitonen (Fifth Division)	Group 2	Western District (SPL Länsi-Suomi)	6th	
2019	Tier 6	Vitonen (Fifth Division)	Group 1	Western District (SPL Länsi-Suomi)	9th	Relegated

- 1 season in Mestaruussarja
- 4 seasons in Suomensarja
- 11 seasons in Maakuntasarja
- 6 seasons in Kolmonen
- 15 seasons in Nelonen
- 17 seasons in Vitonen
- 1 season in Kutonen
