= Kotkan Työväen Palloilijat =

Finnish football club

- Full name: Kotkan Työväen Palloilijat
- Nicknames: KTP; Ahtaajat (“The Longshoremen”)
- Founded: 22 September 1927
- Ground: Arto Tolsa Areena, Kotka
- Capacity: 4,780
- Chairman: Jukka Mustonen
- Manager: Juha Pasoja
- League: Veikkausliiga
- 2026: Ykkösliiga, 1st of 10 (champions; promoted)
- Website: www.fcktp.fi
Home colours	Away colours

Kotkan Työväen Palloilijat (abbreviated as KTP) is a Finnish professional football club based in Kotka, currently competing in Finland's second top tier, the Ykkösliiga. The club was founded in 1927 and its colours are green and white. Immediately after its formation, the club joined the Finnish Workers' Sports Federation, to which it still belongs. KTP plays its home matches at the Arto Tolsa Areena.

== History ==
KTP had a long football traditions centred on its golden age in the early 1950s when the club won two Finnish championships in 1951 and 1952. They also won the Finnish Cup four times, the most recent occasion being in 1980. The club, playing in the renamed Arto Tolsa Areena, were participating in the Veikkausliiga as recently as 2000, but were relegated to Ykkönen and finally went into bankruptcy. The club re-formed and played in the lower divisions before gaining promotion to the Kakkonen in 2007. They spent two seasons in the Kakkonen but were relegated in 2009. In 2010, the club are playing in the Kolmonen and was promoted to Kakkonen where they played 2011–2013.

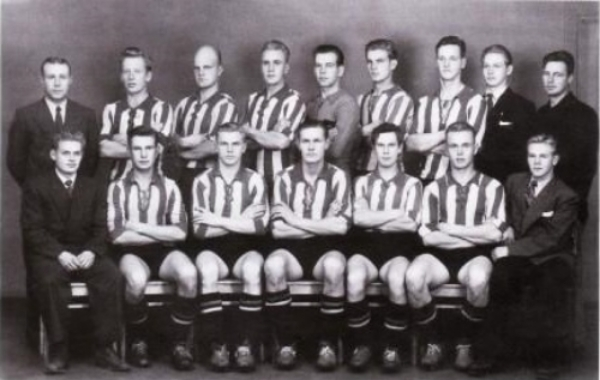
KTP team which won the Finnish championship in 1951

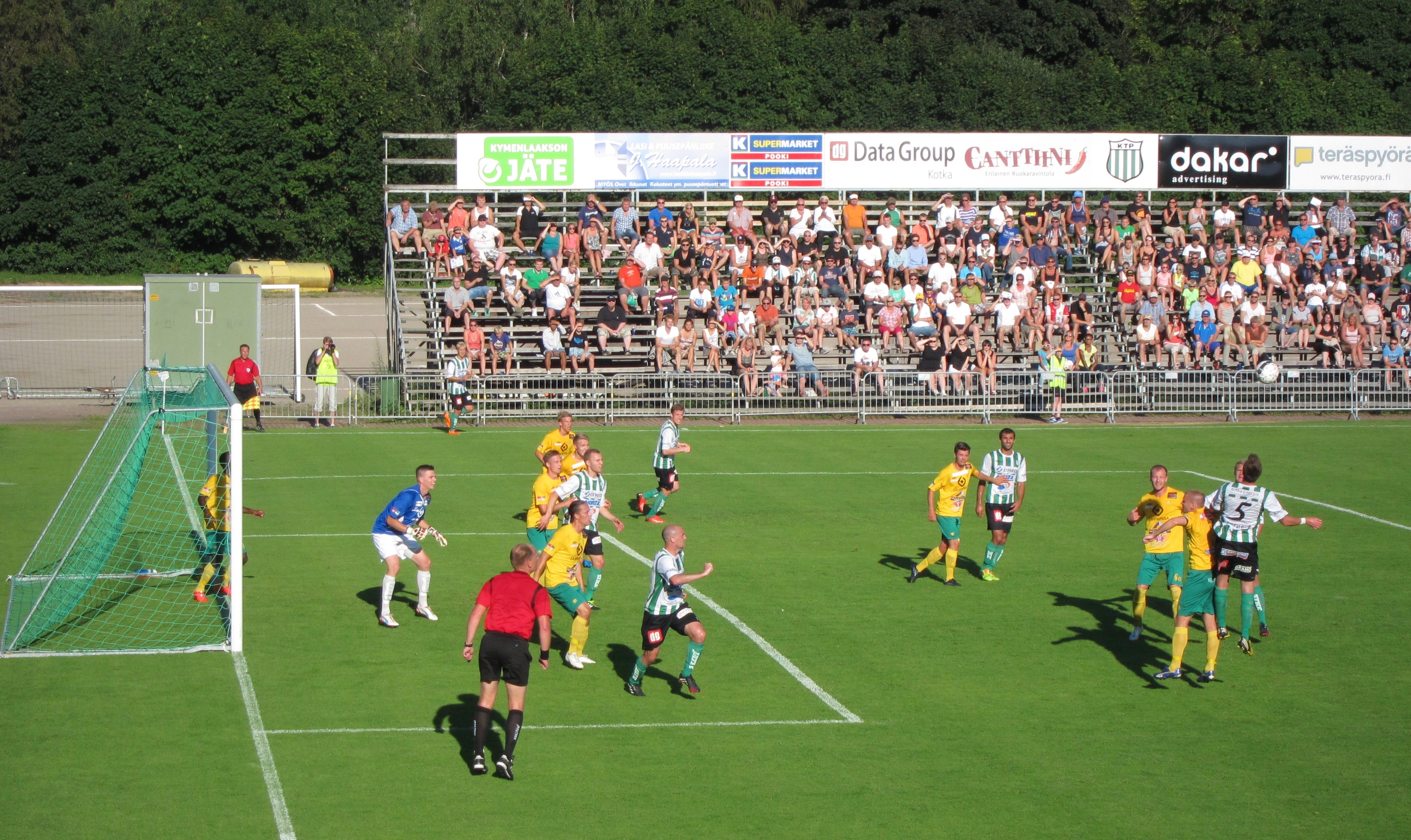
Against Ilves at home in 2014

Season 2014, KTP finished second in Ykkönen, and promoted to Finnish top league Veikkausliiga in season 2015. However, after a difficult 2015 Veikkausliiga season, club finished 11th in the league, and had to play a promotion play-off against PK-35. After two disappointing performances, the club lost on aggregate 3–2, and were relegated back to Ykkönen.

The all-time Championship appearances and leading goal scorer of KTP is Arto Tolsa with 126 goals in 201 matches.

=== Formation of FC KTP ===
During December 2013 a merger took place, as part of which FC KooTeePee adopted the name of FC Kotkan Työväen Palloilijat. As of the 2014 season the merged club were allowed to retain FC KooTeePee's place in the Ykkönen.

Since the start of 2022, a former KTP forward Niko Ikävalko is the sporting director of the club's first team.

== Supporters and rivalries ==
KTP is one of the most supported clubs in Finland. Their closest rival is MyPa. Distance between the two cities is little over 30 kilometres. During December 2017 and January 2018, KTP sold 2273 season tickets, which is the all-time record in the Finnish First Division.

== Stadium ==
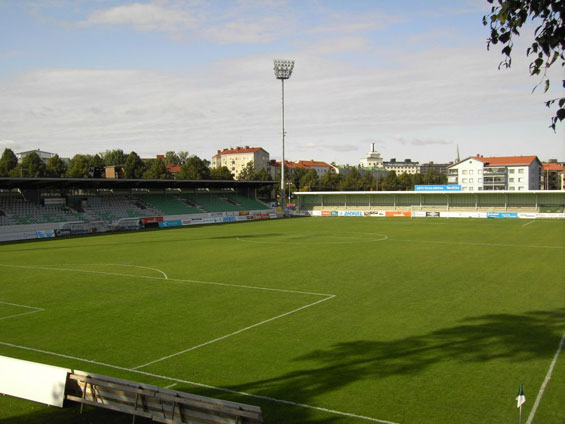
Arto Tolsa Areena in 2015

The home venue of the KTP is Arto Tolsa Arena. It was opened in 1952 and was known as the Kotkan Urheilukeskus, but in 2000 the full renovation of the stadium, the name was changed to the Arto Tolsa Arena. At the beginning of the 2015 season, the pitch was converted to an artificial playing surface. In fall 2023 KTP started demolish the old wooden stand and replace it with a new modern seated stand. The renovation was completed at the beginning of 2024 season.

== Honours ==
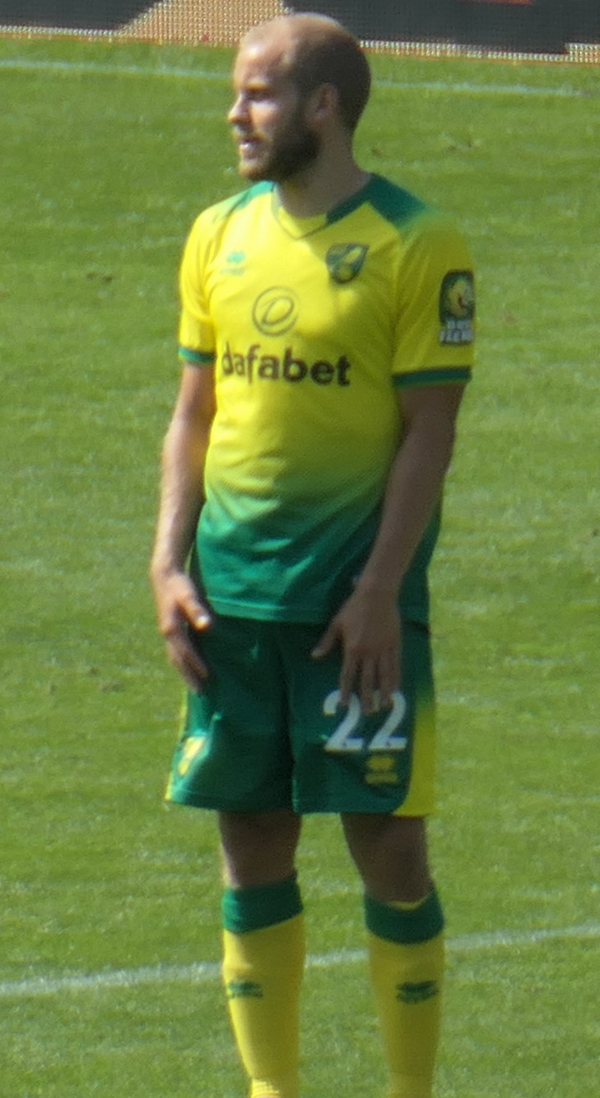
Teemu Pukki started playing football with his hometown club KTP.

Honour	Number	Years
Veikkausliiga
Champions	2	1951, 1952
Third place	2	1947, 1964
Ykkösliiga
Champions	2	2024, 2026
Ykkönen
Champions	1	2022
Runners-up	6	1978, 1995, 1996, 1998, 2014, 2020
Kakkonen
Champions	2	1977, 1993
Runners-up	1	1975
Third place	3	1974, 1976, 1991
Kolmonen
Champions	3	2005, 2007, 2010
Third place	3	2002, 2004, 2006
Finnish Cup
Champions	4	1958, 1961, 1967, 1980
Runners-up	3	1965, 1966, 2000
Finnish League Cup
Runners-up	1	1999

== European campaign ==
KTP have played in Europe on one occasion in the Cup Winners' Cup in the 1981–82 season, having won the Finnish Cup in 1980.

Season	Competition	Round	Country	Club	Score	Agg.
1981–82	UEFA Cup Winners' Cup	First round	(France)	SC Bastia	0–0, v 0–5	0–5

== Divisional Movements since 1930 ==
Top Level (25 seasons): 1948–58, 1963–69, 1979–83, 1999–2000, 2015
Second Level (15 seasons): 1943/44, 1959–62, 1970–72, 1978, 1984, 1994–98, 2014, 2016, 2018-
Third Level (16 seasons): 1973–77, 1985–93, 2008–09, 2011–2013, 2017
Fourth Level (7 seasons): 2002–07, 2010
Fifth Level (1 season): 2001

== Season to season ==
Season to Season

Season	Level	Division	Section	Administration	Position	Movements
1948	Tier 1	SM-Sarja (Division One)		Finnish FA (Suomen Palloliitto)	9th	
1949	Tier 1	SM-Sarja (Division One)		Finnish FA (Suomen Palloliitto)	5th	
1950	Tier 1	SM-Sarja (Division One)		Finnish FA (Suomen Palloliitto)	4th	
1951	Tier 1	SM-Sarja (Division One)		Finnish FA (Suomen Palloliitto)	1st	Champions
1952	Tier 1	SM-Sarja (Division One)		Finnish FA (Suomen Palloliitto)	1st	Champions
1953	Tier 1	SM-Sarja (Division One)		Finnish FA (Suomen Palloliitto)	8th	
1954	Tier 1	SM-Sarja (Division One)		Finnish FA (Suomen Palloliitto)	6th	
1955	Tier 1	SM-Sarja (Division One)		Finnish FA (Suomen Palloliitto)	6th	
1956	Tier 1	SM-Sarja (Division One)		Finnish FA (Suomen Palloliitto)	7th	
1957	Tier 1	SM-Sarja (Division One)		Finnish FA (Suomen Palloliitto)	8th	
1958	Tier 1	SM-Sarja (Division One)		Finnish FA (Suomen Palloliitto)	10th	Relegated
1959	Tier 2	Suomisarja (Division Two)	East	Finnish FA (Suomen Palloliitto)	2nd	
1960	Tier 2	Suomisarja (Division Two)	East	Finnish FA (Suomen Palloliitto)	3rd	
1961	Tier 2	Suomisarja (Division Two)	East	Finnish FA (Suomen Palloliitto)	2nd	
1962	Tier 2	Suomisarja (Division Two)	East	Finnish FA (Suomen Palloliitto)	1st	Promoted
1963	Tier 1	SM-Sarja (Division One)		Finnish FA (Suomen Palloliitto)	5th	
1964	Tier 1	SM-Sarja (Division One)		Finnish FA (Suomen Palloliitto)	3rd	
1965	Tier 1	SM-Sarja (Division One)		Finnish FA (Suomen Palloliitto)	8th	
1966	Tier 1	SM-Sarja (Division One)		Finnish FA (Suomen Palloliitto)	6th	
1967	Tier 1	SM-Sarja (Division One)		Finnish FA (Suomen Palloliitto)	7th	
1968	Tier 1	SM-Sarja (Division One)		Finnish FA (Suomen Palloliitto)	9th	
1969	Tier 1	SM-Sarja (Division One)		Finnish FA (Suomen Palloliitto)	11th	Relegated
1970	Tier 2	Suomisarja (Division Two)	East	Finnish FA (Suomen Palloliitto)	4th	
1971	Tier 2	Suomisarja (Division Two)	East	Finnish FA (Suomen Palloliitto)	5th	
1972	Tier 2	Suomisarja (Division Two)	East	Finnish FA (Suomen Palloliitto)	10th	Relegated
1973	Tier 3	Kakkonen (Second Division)	East	Finnish FA (Suomen Palloliitto)	6th	
1974	Tier 3	Kakkonen (Second Division)	East	Finnish FA (Suomen Palloliitto)	3rd	
1975	Tier 3	Kakkonen (Second Division)	East	Finnish FA (Suomen Palloliitto)	2nd	
1976	Tier 3	Kakkonen (Second Division)	East	Finnish FA (Suomen Palloliitto)	3rd	
1977	Tier 3	Kakkonen (Second Division)	East	Finnish FA (Suomen Palloliitto)	1st	Promoted
1978	Tier 2	Ykkönen (First Division)		Finnish FA (Suomen Palloliitto)	2nd	Promoted
1979	Tier 1	SM-Sarja (Division One)		Finnish FA (Suomen Palloliitto)	8th	
1980	Tier 1	SM-Sarja (Division One)		Finnish FA (Suomen Palloliitto)	5th	
1981	Tier 1	SM-Sarja (Division One)		Finnish FA (Suomen Palloliitto)	6th	
1982	Tier 1	SM-Sarja (Division One)		Finnish FA (Suomen Palloliitto)	9th	
1983	Tier 1	SM-Sarja (Division One)		Finnish FA (Suomen Palloliitto)	12th	Relegated
1984	Tier 2	Ykkönen (First Division)		Finnish FA (Suomen Palloliitto)	12th	Relegated
1985	Tier 3	Kakkonen (Second Division)	East	Finnish FA (Suomen Palloliitto)	5th	
1986	Tier 3	Kakkonen (Second Division)	East	Finnish FA (Suomen Palloliitto)	6th	
1987	Tier 3	Kakkonen (Second Division)	East	Finnish FA (Suomen Palloliitto)	10th	
1988	Tier 3	Kakkonen (Second Division)	East	Finnish FA (Suomen Palloliitto)	8th	
1989	Tier 3	Kakkonen (Second Division)	East	Finnish FA (Suomen Palloliitto)	4th	
1990	Tier 3	Kakkonen (Second Division)	East	Finnish FA (Suomen Palloliitto)	6th	
1991	Tier 3	Kakkonen (Second Division)	East	Finnish FA (Suomen Palloliitto)	3rd	
1992	Tier 3	Kakkonen (Second Division)	East	Finnish FA (Suomen Palloliitto)	5th	
1993	Tier 3	Kakkonen (Second Division)	East	Finnish FA (Suomen Palloliitto)	1st	Promoted
1994	Tier 2	Ykkönen (First Division)		Finnish FA (Suomen Palloliitto)	10th	
1995	Tier 2	Ykkönen (First Division)		Finnish FA (Suomen Palloliitto)	2nd	
1996	Tier 2	Ykkönen (First Division)	South Group	Finnish FA (Suomen Palloliitto)	2nd	
1997	Tier 2	Ykkönen (First Division)	South Group	Finnish FA (Suomen Palloliitto)	3rd	Promotion Group – 4th
1998	Tier 2	Ykkönen (First Division)	South Group	Finnish FA (Suomen Palloliitto)	3rd	Promotion Group – 2nd – Promoted
1999	Tier 1	Veikkausliiga (Premier League)		Finnish FA (Suomen Palloliitto)	7th	
2000	Tier 1	Veikkausliiga (Premier League)		Finnish FA (Suomen Palloliitto)	12th	Relegated
2001	Tier 5	Nelonen (Fourth Division)		South-East Finland (SPL Kaakkois-Suomi)	1st	Promotion Group – 1st – Promoted
2002	Tier 4	Kolmonen (Third Division)		South-East Finland (SPL Kaakkois-Suomi)	3rd	
2003	Tier 4	Kolmonen (Third Division)		South-East Finland (SPL Kaakkois-Suomi)	6th	
2004	Tier 4	Kolmonen (Third Division)		South-East Finland (SPL Kaakkois-Suomi)	3rd	
2005	Tier 4	Kolmonen (Third Division)		South-East Finland (SPL Kaakkois-Suomi)	1st	Playoff Group C
2006	Tier 4	Kolmonen (Third Division)		South-East Finland (SPL Kaakkois-Suomi)	3rd	
2007	Tier 4	Kolmonen (Third Division)		South-East Finland (SPL Kaakkois-Suomi)	1st	Promoted
2008	Tier 3	Kakkonen (Second Division)	Group A	Finnish FA (Suomen Palloliitto)	5th	
2009	Tier 3	Kakkonen (Second Division)	Group A	Finnish FA (Suomen Palloliitto)	12th	Relegated
2010	Tier 4	Kolmonen (Third Division)		South-East Finland (SPL Kaakkois-Suomi)	1st	Promoted
2011	Tier 3	Kakkonen (Second Division)	Group A	Finnish FA (Suomen Palloliitto)	11th	Relegation Playoff
2012	Tier 3	Kakkonen (Second Division)	Lohko Itä (Eastern Group)	Finnish FA (Suomen Palloliitto)	6th	
2013	Tier 3	Kakkonen (Second Division)	Lohko Itä (Eastern Group)	Finnish FA (Suomen Palloliitto)	6th	
2014	Tier 2	Ykkönen (First Division)		Finnish FA (Suomen Palloliitto)	2nd	Promotion playoff, Promoted
2015	Tier 1	Veikkausliiga (Premier League)		Finnish FA (Suomen Palloliitto)	11th	Relegation playoff, Relegated
2016	Tier 2	Ykkönen (First Division)		Finnish FA (Suomen Palloliitto)	9th	Relegated
2017	Tier 3	Kakkonen (Second Division)	Lohko A	Finnish FA (Suomen Palloliitto)	1st	Lost Promotion playoff, Promoted
2018	Tier 2	Ykkönen (First Division)		Finnish FA (Suomen Palloliitto)	7th	
2019	Tier 2	Ykkönen (First Division)		Finnish FA (Suomen Palloliitto)	4th	
2020	Tier 2	Ykkönen (First Division)		Finnish FA (Suomen Palloliitto)	2nd	Promotion playoff, Promoted
2021	Tier 1	Veikkausliiga (Premier League)		Finnish FA (Suomen Palloliitto)	12th	Relegated
2022	Tier 2	Ykkönen (First Division)		Finnish FA (Suomen Palloliitto)	1st	Champions, Promoted
2023	Tier 1	Veikkausliiga (Premier League)		Finnish FA (Suomen Palloliitto)	12th	Relegated
2024	Tier 2	Ykkösliiga (League One)		Finnish FA (Suomen Palloliitto)	1st	Champions, Promoted
2025	Tier 1	Veikkausliiga (Premier League)		Finnish FA (Suomen Palloliitto)	11th	Relegated via play-off

- 28 seasons in Veikkausliiga / SM-Sarja
- 23 seasons in Ykkönen/Ykkösliiga / Suomisarja
- 20 seasons in Kakkonen
- 7 seasons in Kolmonen
- 1 season in Nelonen

=== Club records ===
- Most Championship (SM-sarja) matches: Arto Tolsa, 201 games between 1963 and 1981
- Most goals in Championship (SM-sarja): Arto Tolsa, 126 goals in the years 1963–1981
- Most goals in one season in Championship (SM-sarja) league matches: Arto Tolsa, 26 goals in season 1964
- Home Match attendance record: 6,325 spectators in a match in 1981 against Kuopion Pallotoverit
- Biggest win a Championship (SM-sarja) match: 8–0 home to Valkeakosken Haka in 1952
- Biggest defeat in a Championship (SM-sarja) match: 1–8 away to Turun Palloseura in 1969

=== Attendances since 1994 ===
Season	Average	In all	Division
1994	497	6,455	First Division
1995	795	10,330	First Division
1996	943	13,205	First Division
1997	1,065	14,912	First Division
1998	1,325	18,552	First Division
1999	3,104	43,469	Premier League
2000	1,524	24,387	Premier League
2008	461	5,992	Second Division
2009	414	4,143	Second Division
2014	2,248	31,469	First Division
2015	2,565		Premier League
2016	1,221		First Division

== Current squad ==
As of 3 September 2026

Note: Flags indicate national team as defined under FIFA eligibility rules; some limited exceptions apply. Players may hold more than one non-FIFA nationality.

No.	Pos.	Nation	Player
3	DF	GHA	Derrick Atta Agyei
4	DF	NGR	Junior Chibuzor
5	DF	FIN	Samuli Hölttä
7	MF	FIN	Joni Mäkelä
8	MF	DEN	Mustapha Coker
9	FW	NGR	Paul Ogunkoya (on loan from Mahanaim FC)
10	MF	FIN	Petteri Forsell
11	FW	FIN	Ruslan Haapalainen
13	MF	NGR	Nathaniel Tahmbi
14	FW	NGR	Gift Sunday (on loan from Bodø/Glimt)
15	FW	NGR	Ahmed Adebayo
17	FW	GAM	Foday Manneh

No.	Pos.	Nation	Player
18	FW	FIN	Otto Eloluoto
19	FW	FIN	Roni Polat
20	MF	FIN	Arttu Tulehmo
21	FW	FIN	Onni Hänninen
22	FW	BRA	Lucas Rangel
25	GK	FIN	Juho Leikas
26	DF	FIN	Matias Paavola
29	FW	FIN	Aapo Ruohio
30	DF	FIN	Luka Puhakainen
33	GK	UKR	Maksym Zhuk
37	MF	JPN	Atomu Tanaka

=== On loan ===
Note: Flags indicate national team as defined under FIFA eligibility rules; some limited exceptions apply. Players may hold more than one non-FIFA nationality.

No. / Pos. / Nation / Player	No. / Pos. / Nation / Player

== Management and boardroom ==
=== Management ===
As of 18 July 2025

Name	Role
(Finland) Jonas Nyholm	Head coach
(Finland) Ossi Virta	Assistant coach
(Finland) Mikko Viitsalo	Assistant coach
(Finland) Matias Lindfors	Assistant coach
(Finland) Anton Bogdanov	Goalkeeping coach
(Finland) Johannes Laaksonen	Fitness coach
(Finland) Esa Vilkki	Team manager
(Finland) Aki Jokela	Team manager
(Finland) Toni Leinonen	Kit Manager
(Finland) Otto Olkkonen	Physiotherapist

=== Boardroom ===
As of 18 February 2025

Name	Role
(Finland) Jukka Mustonen	Chairman
(Finland) Jan Walden	CEO
(Finland) Jukka Vilkki	Club secretary
(Finland) Niko Ikävalko	Sporting director

== First team managers since 1980 ==
- (Finland) Kalervo Paananen (1980–82)
- (Poland) Stanislav Sobczynski (1983)
- (Finland) Jouko Alila (1984–88)
- (Poland) Czesław Boguszewicz (1989–91)
- (Finland) Pekka Ihonen (1992)
- (Finland) Heikki Immonen (1993–94)
- (Finland) Markku Wacklin (1995–96)
- (Finland) Olli-Pekka Smal (1997–98)
- (Finland) Hannu Touru (1999–2000)
- (Finland) Jouko Alila (2000)
- (Finland) Risto Inkeroinen (2001)
- (Finland) Vesa Laurikainen (2003–04)
- (Finland) Jouko Alila (2005–06)
- (Finland) Jouko Alila (2008)
- (Finland) Marko Honkanen (2009)
- (Finland) Tommi Keveri (2010)
