= List of football clubs in Finland – I =

This is a list of football clubs in Finland.

== League listings ==
- Championship - Veikkausliiga
- Division 1 - Ykkönen
- Division 2 - Kakkonen
- Division 3 - Kolmonen
- Division 4 - Nelonen
- Division 5 - Vitonen
- Division 6 - Kutonen
- Division 7 - Seiska

== Alphabetical listings ==
Contents: A B C D E F G H I J K L M N O P Q R S T U V W X Y Z Å Ä Ö

=== I ===
Abbreviation	Settlement	District	Official name	Division	Cup	Other information
IFK Jakobstad	Jakobstad	Keski-Pohjanmaa	Idrottsföreningen Kamraterna Jakobstad	Kolmonen	* *	
IFK Jakobstad II	Jakobstad	Keski-Pohjanmaa	Idrottsföreningen Kamraterna Jakobstad / II	Kutonen	*	
IFK Mariehamn	Mariehamn	Åland	Idrottsföreningen Kamraterna i Mariehamn	Veikkausliiga	* * *	Tier 1 (7 seasons): 2005- Tier 2 (4 seasons): 1972, 1977–78, 2004; Tier 3 (21 seasons): 1976, 1979–83, 1985–86, 1989–90, 1993-2003
IFS	Lillby, Pedersöre	Keski-Pohjanmaa	Idrottsföreningen Standard	Kutonen	*	
I-HK M09	Itä-Hakkila, Vantaa	Uusimaa	Itä-Hakkilan Kilpa / M09	Kutonen	* *	
I-Kissat	Tampere	Tampere	Tampereen-Viipurin Ilves-Kissat	Kolmonen	* *	
IK	Ilmajoki	Vaasa	Ilmajoen Kisailijat	Nelonen	* *	
IK Myran	Alaveteli, Kronoby	Keski-Pohjanmaa	Idrottsklubben Myran	Nelonen	* *	
IK Myran II	Nedervetil, Kronoby	Keski-Pohjanmaa	Idrottsklubben Myran / II	Vitonen	*	
IKiri	Ihode, Pyhäranta	Satakunta	Ihoden Kiri	Vitonen	*	
IkU	Ikaalinen	Tampere	Ikaalisten Urheilijat	Kutonen	*	
Ikurin Vire	Tampere	Tampere	Ikurin Vire	Kutonen	* *	
Ilves	Tampere	Tampere	Ilves	Kakkonen	* * *	
IPa	Iittala	Tampere	Iittalan Pallo	Kutonen	*	
IPS	Imatra	Kaakkois-Suomi	Imatran Palloseura	Kolmonen	* *	
IVFC	Oulu	Pohjois-Suomi	Inter Välivainio FC	Vitonen	* *	
IVPA	Vantaa	Uusimaa	Itä-Vantaan Pallo	Kutonen	* *	
IVU	Vantaa	Uusimaa	Itä-Vantaan Urheilijat	Vitonen	*	
IVU Skoobarit	Vantaa	Uusimaa	Itä-Vantaan Urheilijat / Skoobarit	Kutonen	*	
