= List of football clubs in Finland – P =

This is a list of football clubs in Finland.

== League listings ==
- Championship - Veikkausliiga
- Division 1 - Ykkönen
- Division 2 - Kakkonen
- Division 3 - Kolmonen
- Division 4 - Nelonen
- Division 5 - Vitonen
- Division 6 - Kutonen
- Division 7 - Seiska

== Alphabetical listings ==
Contents: A B C D E F G H I J K L M N O P Q R S T U V W X Y Z Å Ä Ö

=== P ===
Abbreviation	Settlement	District	Official name	Division	Cup	Other information
PaiHa	Paimio	Turku	Paimion Haka	Vitonen	* *	
PaKa	Siikajoki	Pohjois-Suomi	Paavolan Kisa	Vitonen	* *	
Pallohonka	Espoo	Uusimaa	Pallohonka Juniorit	Kakkonen	* * *	
Pamaus	Paattinen	Turku	Paattisten Pamaus	Kutonen	*	
PaPa	Pasmajärvi, Kolari	Pohjois-Suomi	Pasmajärven Palloilijat	Nelonen	*	
PaPe	Voikka, Kouvola	Kaakkois-Suomi	Pallo-Peikot	Kolmonen	* *	
PaRi	Palokka	Keski-Suomi	Palokan Riento	Nelonen	* *	
PaRi II	Palokka	Keski-Suomi	Palokan Riento / II	Vitonen	*	
ParVi	Parola, Hattula	Tampere	Parolan Visa	Vitonen	* *	
ParVi KäPy	Parola, Hattula	Tampere	Parolan Visa / KäPy	Kutonen	*	
PaTe	Pattijoki	Pohjois-Suomi	Pattijoen Tempaus	Nelonen	*	
PaTe 2	Raahe	Pohjois-Suomi	Pattijoen Tempaus / 2	Vitonen	*	
Pathoven	Vantaa	Uusimaa	Football Club Pathoven	Nelonen	* *	
PATO	Tervakoski, Janakkala	Tampere	Tervakosken Pato	Kolmonen	* *	
PATO /2	Tervakoski, Janakkala	Tampere	Tervakosken Pato / 2	Kutonen	*	
PAVE	Iisalmi	Itä-Suomi	PAVE	Vitonen	*	
PaVin	Pansio	Turku	Pansion Vintiöt	Vitonen	*	
PEF	Espoo	Uusimaa	FC Pelifiilis	Nelonen	*	
PeFF	Pedersöre	Keski-Pohjanmaa	Pedersöre Fotbollsförening	Nelonen	*	
PeFF II	Pedersöre	Keski-Pohjanmaa	Pedersöre Fotbollsförening / II	Kutonen	*	
PeKa	Karhula, Kotka	Kaakkois-Suomi	Peli-Karhut	Vitonen	*	
PeKa/2	Karhula, Kotka	Kaakkois-Suomi	Peli-Karhut / 2	Kutonen	*	
Pelikaani	Hyvinkää	Uusimaa	Urheiluseura Hyvinkään Pelikaani	Kutonen	*	
PEPO	Lappeenranta	Kaakkois-Suomi	PEPO Lappeenranta	Kakkonen	* * *	
PePo	Pertunmaa	Kaakkois-Suomi	Pertunmaan Ponnistajat	Kutonen	*	
PeTe	Helsinki	Helsinki	PeTe	Seiska	*	
PETO	Malminkartano	Helsinki	Malminkartanon PETO (Peli-Toverit)	Kutonen	*	
PetPet	Petäjävesi	Keski-Suomi	Petäjäveden Petäiset	Vitonen	*	
PH-99	Helsinki	Helsinki	Pallo Hukassa-99	Vitonen	* *	
PIF	Pargas	Turku	Pargas Idrottsförening	Kolmonen	* *	
PiPo-79	Pispala	Tampere	Pispalan Ponnistus -79	Vitonen	* *	
PiPS	Piikkiö	Turku	Piikkiön Palloseura	Vitonen	* *	
P-Iirot	Rauma	Satakunta	Pallo-Iirot	Kakkonen	* * *	
P-Iirot 2	Rauma	Satakunta	Pallo-Iirot / 2	Nelonen	* *	
PIsku	Hattula	Tampere	Pekolan Isku	Vitonen	*	
PiTU	Pori	Satakunta	Pihlavan Työväen Urheilijat	Nelonen	*	
PJK	Pirkkala	Tampere	Pirkkalan Jalkapalloklubi	Kolmonen	* *	
PJK /2	Pirkkala	Tampere	Pirkkalan Jalkapalloklubi / 2	Vitonen	* *	
PJK /3	Pirkkala	Tampere	Pirkkalan Jalkapalloklubi / 3	Kutonen	*	
PK-35	Vantaa	Uusimaa	Pallokerho-35	Ykkönen	* * *	
PK-35	Helsinki	Helsinki	Pallokerho-35 ry	Kolmonen	* *	Previously known as PK-35/2.
PK-37	Iisalmi	Itä-Suomi	Pallo-Kerho 37	Kakkonen	* * *	
PK-37/2	Iisalmi	Itä-Suomi	Pallo-Kerho 37 / 2	Vitonen	*	
PK Keski-Uusimaa	Kerava	Uusimaa	Pallokerho Keski-Uusimaa	Kakkonen	* * *	
Ponnistajat	Malmi	Helsinki	Malmin Ponnistajat	Kutonen	* *	
Ponnistus	Helsinki	Helsinki	Helsingin Ponnistus	Kolmonen	* *	
Ponnistus/2	Helsinki	Helsinki	Helsingin Ponnistus / 2	Vitonen	*	
Ponnistus	Lapua	Vaasa	Lapuan Ponnistus	Nelonen	*	
Ponnistus/2	Lapua	Vaasa	Lapuan Ponnistus / 2	Kutonen	*	
Ponteva	Turku	Turku	Turun Ponteva	Vitonen	*	
PONU BK	Nokia	Tampere	Pohjois Nokian Urheilijat Bollklubben	Kutonen	*	
PoPa	Pori	Satakunta	Porin Palloilijat	Kakkonen	* * *	
PoPo	Popinniemi, Kotka	Kaakkois-Suomi	Popinniemen Ponnistus	Vitonen	* *	
PoPS-78	Polvijärvi	Itä-Suomi	Polvijärven Palloseura-78	Vitonen	*	
PoSa	Pormestarinluoto, Pori	Satakunta	Pormestarinluodon Salama	Nelonen	*	
Pöxyt	Espoo	Uusimaa	SexyPöxyt	Kolmonen	* *	
PP-70	Tampere	Tampere	Tampereen Peli-Pojat-70	Nelonen	* *	
PP-70 /2	Tampere	Tampere	Tampereen Peli-Pojat-70 / 2	Vitonen	* *	
PPJ	Lauttasaari, Eira	Helsinki	Pallo-Pojat Juniorit	Nelonen	* *	
PPJ/Akatemia	Lauttasaari, Eira	Helsinki	Pallopojat Juniorit / Akatemia	Vitonen	* *	
PPV	Pajamäki	Helsinki	Pajamäen Pallo-Veikot	Kolmonen	* *	
PPV/2	Pajamäki	Helsinki	Pajamäen Pallo-Veikot / 2	Vitonen	* *	
PPV/Seos	Pajamäki	Helsinki	Pajamäen Pallo-Veikot / Seos	Vitonen	*	
Prs Into	Jakobstad	Keski-Pohjanmaa	Pietarsaaren Into	Vitonen	*	
PS-44	Valkeakoski	Tampere	Pallo-Sepot -44	Kolmonen	*	
PS Kemi Kings	Kemi	Pohjois-Suomi	Palloseura Kemi Kings	Kakkonen	* * *	
PS Kemi 2	Kemi	Pohjois-Suomi	Palloseura Kemi Kings / 2	Kolmonen	*	
PUF	Pensala, Nykarleby	Keski-Pohjanmaa	Pensala Ungdomsförening	Kutonen	*	
PuiU	Helsinki	Helsinki	Puistolan Urheilijat	Kolmonen	*	
PuM	Espoo	Uusimaa	Punainen Mylly	Vitonen	*	
PuPo	Vantaa	Uusimaa	PuPo FC Vantaa	Kutonen	*	
Purha	Inkeroinen, Kouvola	Kaakkois-Suomi	Inkeroisten Purha	Vitonen	* *	
