= List of football clubs in Finland – H =

This is a list of football clubs in Finland.

== League listings ==
- Championship - Veikkausliiga
- Division 1 - Ykkönen
- Division 2 - Kakkonen
- Division 3 - Kolmonen
- Division 4 - Nelonen
- Division 5 - Vitonen
- Division 6 - Kutonen
- Division 7 - Seiska

== Alphabetical listings ==
Contents: A B C D E F G H I J K L M N O P Q R S T U V W X Y Z Å Ä Ö

=== H ===
Abbreviation	Settlement	District	Official name	Division	Cup	Other information
HakPa	Hakaniemi	Helsinki	Hakaniemen Palloilijat	Kutonen	*	
HammIK	Hammarland, Åland	Åland	Hammarlands Idrottsklubb	Nelonen	*	
HaNa	Oitti, Hausjärvi	Uusimaa	Hausjärven Nappulat	Kutonen	*	
HaPK	Hamina	Kaakkois-Suomi	Haminan Pallo-Kissat	Nelonen	* *	
HaRi Legends	Hakunila, Vantaa	Uusimaa	Hakunilan Riento / Legends	Kutonen	*	
Harjun Potku (BET)	Jyväskylä	Keski-Suomi	Blue Eyes Team / Harjun Potku	Vitonen	*	
HaTP	Hamina	Kaakkois-Suomi	Haminan Työväen Palloilijat	Kutonen	* *	
HauPa	Haukipudas	Pohjois-Suomi	Haukiputaan Pallo	Kakkonen	* *	Tier 3 (2 seasons): 2000, 2011
HauPa 2	Haukipudas	Pohjois-Suomi	Haukiputaan Pallo / 2	Vitonen	*	
HBK	Kronoby (Kruunupyy)	Keski-Pohjanmaa	Hovsala Bollklubb	Nelonen	*	
HBK II	Kronoby (Kruunupyy)	Keski-Pohjanmaa	Hovsala Bollklubb / II	Kutonen	*	
HC Ränni	Espoo	Uusimaa	Herraclubi Ränni	Vitonen	* *	
HC Skavaböle	Tuusula	Uusimaa	Keski-Uudenmaan Pallo / HC Skavaböle	Vitonen	*	
HC-MD	Espoo	Uusimaa	HC Manalan Dynamo	Kutonen	*	
HDS / Mondial	Kumpula	Helsinki	Helsinki Diplomat Sports Club / Mondial	Kolmonen	* *	
HDS/Club Latino Español	Kumpula	Helsinki	Helsinki Diplomat Sports Club / Club Latino Español	Kutonen	*	
HDS/Express	Kumpula	Helsinki	Helsinki Diplomat Sports Club / Express	Seiska	*	
HDS/Magnifiga	Kumpula	Helsinki	Helsinki Diplomat Sports Club / Magnifiga	Seiska	*	
Heitto	Hirvensalo	Turku	Hirvensalon Heitto	Kutonen	*	
HeKuLa	Hakaniemi	Helsinki	Helsingin Kukkaislapset	Vitonen	* *	
HeMan	Helsinki	Helsinki	Hesperian Mankeli	Kutonen	* *	
HePu	Helsinki	Helsinki	FC Helsingin Pumppu	Kutonen	* *	
HePu/FCFC	Helsinki	Helsinki	Helsingin Pumppu/ FCFC	Seiska	*	
HePuLi	Helsinki	Helsinki	Helsingin Punalippu	Vitonen	*	
Herkku-Papat	Oulu	Pohjois-Suomi	Herkku-Papat	Vitonen	*	
Herrasmiehet	Helsinki	Helsinki	Jalkapalloseura Herrasmiehet	Nelonen	*	
HerTo	Herttoniemi	Helsinki	Herttoniemen Toverit	Kolmonen	* *	
HerTo/2	Herttoniemi	Helsinki	Herttoniemen Toverit / 2	Kutonen	*	
HIFK	Helsinki	Helsinki	HIFK Fotboll	Ykkönen	* * *	
HIFK/2	Helsinki	Helsinki	HIFK Fotboll / 2	Nelonen	* *	
HIFK/3	Helsinki	Helsinki	HIFK Fotboll / 3	Kutonen	* *	
HiHi	Hirvelä, Anjalankoski, Kouvola	Kaakkois-Suomi	Hirvelän Hirvet	Kutonen	*	
HirPy	Hirsilä, Orivesi	Tampere	Hirsilän Pyrkivä	Kutonen	*	
HJK	Helsinki	Helsinki	Helsingin Jalkapalloklubi	Veikkausliiga	* * *	
HJK-j/Kmäki	Kannelmäki	Helsinki	Helsingin Jalkapalloklubi Juniorit / Kannelmäki	Vitonen	* *	
HJK-j/Lsalo	Laajasalo	Helsinki	Helsingin Jalkapalloklubi Juniorit / Laajasalo	Vitonen	* *	
HJK-j/Töölö	Töölö	Helsinki	Helsingin Jalkapalloklubi Juniorit / Töölö	Seiska	* *	
HK	Haapajärvi	Keski-Pohjanmaa	Haapajärven Kiilat	Kutonen	*	
HNs	Huittinen	Satakunta	Huhtamon Nuorisoseura	Nelonen	*	
Honka 3	Espoo	Uusimaa	Football Club Honka / 3	Nelonen	*	
Honka Viitonen	Espoo	Uusimaa	Football Club Honka / Viitonen	Kutonen	*	
HooGee	Haukilahti, Espoo	Uusimaa	Haukilahden Pallo-Gäddviks Boll	Vitonen	* *	
HooGee 1	Haukilahti, Espoo	Uusimaa	Haukilahden Pallo-Gäddviks Boll / 1	Vitonen	*	
HooGee 2	Haukilahti, Espoo	Uusimaa	Haukilahden Pallo-Gäddviks Boll / 1	Kutonen	*	
HooGee 4	Haukilahti, Espoo	Uusimaa	Haukilahden Pallo-Gäddviks Boll / 4	Vitonen	*	
Hot Lips	Turku	Turku	FC HotLips Turku	Vitonen	*	
HöySä	Pitäjänmäki	Helsinki	Höyläämötien Sähly	Seiska	*	
HP-47	Heinola	Kaakkois-Suomi	Heinolan Palloilijat-47	Kolmonen	* *	
HPP	Haapamäki	Keski-Suomi	Haapamäen Pallo-Pojat	Nelonen	*	
HPS	Helsinki	Helsinki	Helsingin Palloseura	Kolmonen	* * *	
HPS/2	Helsinki	Helsinki	Helsingin Palloseura / 2	Nelonen	*	
HPS/Jägers	Helsinki	Helsinki	Helsingin Palloseura / Jägers	Seiska	*	
HST	Hervanta	Tampere	Hervanta Sporting Team	Vitonen	* *	
Huima	Äänekoski	Keski-Suomi	Äänekosken Huima	Kolmonen	* *	
Hukat	Nummi-Pusula	Uusimaa	Nummen Hukat	Kutonen	*	
Huki	Jyväskylä	Keski-Suomi	Huki Jyväskylä	Nelonen	*	
HuPa	Huuha, Naarajärvi	Itä-Suomi	Huuhan Pallo	Vitonen	*	
HuPaVeikot	Helsinki	Helsinki	HuPaVeikot	Seiska	*	
Hurtat	Lieksa	Itä-Suomi	Juniori-Hurtat	Nelonen	* *	
HUS 1	Hyvinkää	Uusimaa	Hyvinkään Urheiluseura / 1	Kutonen	*	
HUS 2	Hyvinkää	Uusimaa	Hyvinkään Urheiluseura / 2	Kutonen	*	
HyPS	Hyvinkää	Uusimaa	Hyvinkään Palloseura	Kolmonen	* * *	
HyPS 02	Hyvinkää	Uusimaa	Hyvinkään Palloseura / 02	Nelonen	*	
HäPS	Hämeenkylä, Vantaa	Uusimaa	Hämeenkylän Palloseura	Kutonen	*	
Härmä	Hämeenlinna	Tampere	Hämeenlinnan Härmä	Kolmonen	* *	
