= List of football clubs in Finland – T =

This is a list of football clubs in Finland.

== League listings ==
- Championship - Veikkausliiga
- Division 1 - Ykkönen
- Division 2 - Kakkonen
- Division 3 - Kolmonen
- Division 4 - Nelonen
- Division 5 - Vitonen
- Division 6 - Kutonen
- Division 7 - Seiska

== Alphabetical listings ==
Contents: A B C D E F G H I J K L M N O P Q R S T U V W X Y Z Å Ä Ö

=== T ===
Abbreviation	Settlement	District	Official name	Division	Cup	Other information
TaaJä	Taalintehdas	Turku	Taalintehtaan Jäntevä	Vitonen	* *	
Tampere United	Tampere	Tampere	Tampere United	Veikkausliiga	* * *	
TamU-K	Tampere	Tampere	Tampere Unitedin kannattajat	Nelonen	* * *	
TaPa	Tampere	Tampere	Tampereen Palloilijat	Vitonen	*	
TaPa 2	Tampere	Tampere	Tampereen Palloilijat / 2	Kutonen	*	
Tarmo	Kälviä, Kokkola	Keski-Pohjanmaa	Kälviän Tarmo	Kutonen	*	
Tavastia	Helsinki	Helsinki	FC Tavastia	Nelonen	*	
Tavastia/FC Mojo	Helsinki	Helsinki	FC Tavastia / FC Mojo	Kutonen	*	
Team NIK	Nykarleby	Keski-Pohjanmaa	Nykarleby Idrottsklubb	Vitonen	*	
Team Vanpa	Vantaa	Uusimaa	Team Vanpa	Vitonen	*	
Tervarit	Oulu	Pohjois-Suomi	Tervarit	Kolmonen	* *	
TeTe	Tervalaakso, Vaasa	Vaasa	Tervalaakson Teräs	Vitonen	* *	
TGrani	Kauniainen	Uusimaa	Team Grani	Nelonen	*	
Tikka	Espoo	Uusimaa	Espoon Tikka	Vitonen	* *	
Tikka -88	Espoo	Uusimaa	Espoon Tikka / -88	Kutonen	*	
TiPS	Tikkurila, Vantaa	Uusimaa	Tikkurilan Palloseura	Kolmonen	* *	
TiPS M2	Tikkurila	Uusimaa	Tikkurilan Palloseura / M2	Kutonen	*	
TJK LiePo	Tampere	Tampere	Tampereen Jalkapalloklubi / LiePo	Vitonen	*	
TKT	Tampere	Tampere	Tampereen Kisatoverit	Kolmonen	* *	
TKT KooTee	Tampere	Tampere	Tampereen Kisatoverit / KooTee	Vitonen	*	
ToPS-90	Tohmajärvi	Itä-Suomi	Tohmajärven Palloseura-90	Nelonen	* *	
Torre Calcio	Turku	Turku	Torre Calcio	Kutonen	*	
ToTa	Tornio	Pohjois-Suomi	Tornion Tarmo	Kolmonen	*	
ToTe/AP	Toukola	Helsinki	Toukolan Teräs / Avauspotku	Vitonen	* *	
ToU	Toivala, Siilinjärvi	Itä-Suomi	Toivalan Urheilijat	Nelonen	* *	
ToU/2	Toivala, Siilinjärvi	Itä-Suomi	Toivalan Urheilijat / 2	Vitonen	*	
TOVE	Pori	Satakunta	Toejoen Veikot	Kolmonen	* *	
TOVE2	Pori	Satakunta	Toejoen Veikot / 2	Vitonen	*	
TP-47	Tornio	Pohjois-Suomi	Tornion Pallo-47	Kakkonen	* * *	
TP-49	Toijala, Akaa	Tampere	Toijalan Pallo-49	Nelonen	* *	Also abbreviated as ToiP -49.
TP-Seinäjoki	Seinäjoki	Vaasa	TP-Seinäjoki (Törnävän Pallo)	Nelonen	*	
TP-T	Tampere	Tampere	Tampereen Peli-Toverit	Kolmonen	* *	
TPK	Turku	Turku	Turun Pallokerho	Kolmonen	* *	
TPK 2	Turku	Turku	Turun Pallokerho / 2	Nelonen	* *	
TPS	Turku	Turku	Turun Palloseura	Veikkausliiga	* * *	
TPV	Tampere	Tampere	Tampereen Palloveikot	Ykkönen	* * *	
TPV 2	Tampere	Tampere	Tampereen Pallo-Veikot / 2	Kolmonen	* *	
Trikiinit	Helsinki	Helsinki	Trikiinit	Kutonen	*	
Träfk	Järvenpää	Uusimaa	Träskända Fotboll Klub	Kutonen	*	
TsV	Taipalsaari	Kaakkois-Suomi	Taipalsaaren Veikot	Nelonen	*	
TuHa	Turku	Turku	Turun Haka	Kutonen	*	
Tuisku Daltonit	Orivesi	Tampere	Oriveden Tuisku / Daltonit	Vitonen	*	
TuKV	Turku	Turku	Turun Kisa-Veikot	Vitonen	*	
TuPS	Tuusula	Uusimaa	Tuusulan Palloseura	Kolmonen	* *	
TuPS 2	Tuusula	Uusimaa	Tuusulan Palloseura / 2	Kutonen	*	
TuPV	Turku	Turku	Turun Pallo-Veikot	Vitonen	* *	
TUS	Terjärv, Kronoby	Keski-Pohjanmaa	Terjärv Ungdoms Sportklubb	Nelonen	* *	
TUS II	Terjärv, Kronoby	Keski-Pohjanmaa	Terjärv Ungdoms Sportklubb / II	Vitonen	*	
TuTo	Turku	Turku	Turun Toverit	Kolmonen	*	
TuTo 2	Turku	Turku	Turun Toverit / 2	Kutonen	*	
TuWe	Turku	Turku	Turun Weikot	Nelonen	*	
TuWe 2	Turku	Turku	Turun Weikot / 2	Kutonen	*	
TuWe 3	Turku	Turku	Turun Weikot / 3	Kutonen	*	
Töjby FC	Töjby, Närpes	Vaasa	Töjby FC	Vitonen	*	
Töölön Taisto	Töölö	Helsinki	Töölön Taisto	Nelonen	* *	
