= List of football clubs in Finland – S =

This is a list of football clubs in Finland.

== League listings ==
- Championship - Veikkausliiga
- Division 1 - Ykkönen
- Division 2 - Kakkonen
- Division 3 - Kolmonen
- Division 4 - Nelonen
- Division 5 - Vitonen
- Division 6 - Kutonen
- Division 7 - Seiska

== Alphabetical listings ==
Contents: A B C D E F G H I J K L M N O P Q R S T U V W X Y Z Å Ä Ö

=== S ===
Abbreviation	Settlement	District	Official Name	Division	Cup	Other information
SalPa	Salo	Turku	Salon Palloilijat	Kakkonen	* * *	
SalReipas	Lahti	Uusimaa	Salpausselän Reipas	Kolmonen	* *	
SalReipas Akatemia	Lahti	Uusimaa	Salpausselän Reipas / Akatemia	Vitonen	* *	
SAPA	Helsinki	Helsinki	SAPA (Savannan Pallo)	Kolmonen	* *	
SAPA/2	Helsinki	Helsinki	SAPA (Savannan Pallo) / 2	Vitonen	* *	
SAPA/3	Helsinki	Helsinki	SAPA (Savannan Pallo) / 3	Seiska	* *	
SaPa	Pieksämäki	Itä-Suomi	Savon Pallo	Nelonen	*	
SaPeLi	Salo	Turku	Salon Peli ja Liikunta	Kutonen	*	
SaTo	Salo	Turku	Salon Toverit	Nelonen	* *	
SavU	Mikkeli	Kaakkois-Suomi	Savilahden Urheilijat	Kolmonen	* *	
SAYKUS	Helsinki	Helsinki	SAYKUS (Suomi-Arabia Ystävyys, Kulttuuri ja Urheilu Seura)	Vitonen	*	
SäyRi	Säynätsalo, Jyväskylä	Keski-Suomi	Säynätsalon Riento	Nelonen	*	
SC Hornets	Raisio	Turku	Soccer Club Hornets	Kutonen	*	
SC KuFu-98	Kuopio	Itä-Suomi	Soccer Club Kuopio Futis-98	Kolmonen	* *	
SC Riverball	Joensuu	Itä-Suomi	Soccer Club Riverball	Kakkonen	* * *	
SC Riverball/2	Joensuu	Itä-Suomi	Soccer Club Riverball / 2	Nelonen	* *	
SC Stix	Turku	Turku	SC Stix	Kutonen	*	
SC Zulimanit	Kuopio	Itä-Suomi	Soccer Club Zulimanit	Kolmonen	* *	
SCR	Raisio	Turku	Sporting Club Raisio	Vitonen	*	
Sepsi-78	Seinäjoki	Vaasa	Sepsi-78	Kutonen	*	
Sheikit	Helsinki	Helsinki	Arabian Sheikit	Kutonen	*	
SibboV	Sipoo	Uusimaa	IF Sibbo-Vargarna	Kolmonen	* *	
SibboV 2	Sipoo	Uusimaa	IF Sibbo-Vargarna / 2	Vitonen	* *	
SIF	Sundom, Vaasa	Vaasa	Sundom Idrottsförening	Kolmonen	*	
SIF/2	Sundom, Vaasa	Vaasa	Sundom Idrottsförening	Kutonen	*	
SIFFK	Sund, Åland	Åland	Sunds IF	Kolmonen	*	
SIK	Solf, Korsholm	Vaasa	Solf IK	Vitonen	*	
Sinimustat	Turku	Turku	FC Sinimustat	No Record	* *	
SiPS	Siilinjärvi	Itä-Suomi	Siilinjärven Palloseura	Kolmonen	*	
SiPS/2	Siilinjärvi	Itä-Suomi	Siilinjärven Palloseura / 2	Vitonen	*	
Sisu	Seinäjoki	Vaasa	Seinäjoen Sisu	Vitonen	* *	
SiU	Simpele, Rautjärvi	Kaakkois-Suomi	Simpeleen Urheilijat	Nelonen	* *	
SiU/2 PaSa/2	Simpele, Rautjärvi / Imatra	Kaakkois-Suomi	Simpeleen Urheilijat 2 / Imatran Pallo-Salamat 2	Vitonen	*	
SJK	Seinäjoki	Vaasa	Seinäjoen Jalkapallokerho	Ykkönen	* * *	
SJK/2	Seinäjoki	Vaasa	Seinäjoen Jalkapallokerho /2	Kolmonen	*	
SKT-Futis	Summa, Hamina	Kaakkois-Suomi	Summan Kisa-toverit Futis	Kutonen	*	
Soho SS	Tampere	Tampere	Soho Sporting Society	Vitonen	*	
SoPa	Sodankylä	Pohjois-Suomi	Sodankylän Pallo	Nelonen	*	
SoPS	Soini	Vaasa	Soinin Palloseura	Kutonen	*	
Sopu	Sääksmäki, Valkeakoski	Tampere	Sääksmäen Sopu	Vitonen	*	
SoU	Sorsakoski, Leppävirta	Itä-Suomi	Sorsakosken Urheilijat	Nelonen	*	
SoU/2	Sorsakoski, Leppävirta	Itä-Suomi	Sorsakosken Urheilijat / 2	Vitonen	*	
Souls AC	Jyväskylä	Keski-Suomi	Souls AC	Nelonen	* *	
SoVo	Somero	Turku	Someron Voima	Kolmonen	* * *	
SoVo 2	Somero	Turku	Someron Voima / 2	Kutonen	*	
Spartak	Helsinki	Helsinki	Spartak	Kolmonen	*	
Spartak Kajaani	Kajaani	Pohjois-Suomi	Spartak Kajaani	Kolmonen	* *	
Sporting	Kristinestad	Vaasa	Sporting Kristina	Kakkonen	*	
Sporting /2	Kristinestad	Vaasa	Sporting Kristina	Kutonen	*	
SS Stanley	Oulunkylä	Helsinki	SS Stanley	Vitonen	*	
Stallions	Kallio	Helsinki	Kallion Stallions	Kutonen	*	
Stars	Lahti	Uusimaa	Jalkapalloseura Stars	Kolmonen	* *	
STPS	Savonlinna	Kaakkois-Suomi	Savonlinnan Työväen Palloseura	Kolmonen	* *	
STPS/2	Savonlinna	Kaakkois-Suomi	Savonlinnan Työväen Palloseura / 2	Nelonen	*	
Strikers/Bertil	Helsinki	Helsinki	Strikers / Bertil	Vitonen	*	
StU	Savitaipale	Kaakkois-Suomi	Savitaipaleen Urheilijat	Kutonen	*	
Sudet	Kouvola	Kaakkois-Suomi	Sudet	Kolmonen	* *	
Sudet/2	Kouvola	Kaakkois-Suomi	Sudet / 2	Kutonen	*	
Sudet Pure Amis	Kouvola	Kaakkois-Suomi	Sudet / Pure Amis	Kutonen	*	
SUMU	Suurmetsä	Helsinki	Suurmetsän Urheilijat	Nelonen	* *	
SUMU/77	Suurmetsä	Helsinki	Suurmetsän Urheilijat / 77	Kutonen	*	
SuSi YB	Suvilahti, Vaasa	Vaasa	Suvilahden Sisu / Young Boys	Nelonen	*	
SuSi/2	Suvilahti, Vaasa	Vaasa	Suvilahden Sisu / 2	Vitonen	*	
SW	Sastamala	Tampere	Sastamalan Voima	Kutonen	* *	
Såka	Kokkola	Keski-Pohjanmaa	Såka Fotboll	Vitonen	*	
Sääripotku	Kokkola	Keski-Pohjanmaa	FC Sääripotku	Vitonen	* *	
