= List of football clubs in Finland – O =

This is a list of football clubs in Finland.

== League listings ==
- Championship - Veikkausliiga
- Division 1 - Ykkönen
- Division 2 - Kakkonen
- Division 3 - Kolmonen
- Division 4 - Nelonen
- Division 5 - Vitonen
- Division 6 - Kutonen
- Division 7 - Seiska

== Alphabetical listings ==
Contents: A B C D E F G H I J K L M N O P Q R S T U V W X Y Z Å Ä Ö

=== O ===
Abbreviation	Settlement	District	Official Name	Division	Cup	Other information
OK	Olari, Espoo	Uusimaa	Olarin Kiksi	Vitonen	* *	Another abbreviation is Kiksi.
Oldboys	Jakobstad	Keski-Pohjanmaa	Fotbollsföreningen Oldboys	Kutonen	*	
OldSchool	Tampere	Tampere	AC OldSchool CF	Vitonen	* *	
Ompun Pomppu	Helsinki	Helsinki	Ompun Pomppu	Kutonen	*	
OPedot	Orimattila	Uusimaa	Orimattilan Pedot	Nelonen	* *	
OPedot 2	Orimattila	Uusimaa	Orimattilan Pedot / 2	Kutonen	*	
OPS	Oulu	Pohjois-Suomi	Oulun Palloseura	Ykkönen	* * *	
OPS-juniorit	Oulu	Pohjois-Suomi	Oulun Palloseura juniorit	Kolmonen	*	
Orient U	Vantaa	Uusimaa	Orient United	Vitonen	* *	
Orson	Helsinki	Helsinki	Orson	Seiska	*	
OT-77 2	Olari, Espoo	Uusimaa	Olarin Tarmo -77 / 2	Vitonen	*	
OT-77 Aarni United	Olari, Espoo	Uusimaa	Olarin Tarmo -77 / Aarni United	Kutonen	*	
OT-77 FC Puhallin	Espoo	Uusimaa	Olarin Tarmo -77 / FC Puhallin	Vitonen	*	
OTP	Oulu	Pohjois-Suomi	Oulun Työväen Palloilijat	Kolmonen	*	
OU	Oripää	Turku	Oripään Urheilijat	Kutonen	*	
OuHu	Oulainen	Keski-Pohjanmaa	Oulaisten Huima	Vitonen	* *	
OuJK	Oulu	Pohjois-Suomi	Oulun Jalkapalloklubi	Nelonen	*	
OuPa	Outokumpu	Itä-Suomi	Outokummun Pallo		*	
OuRe	Oulu	Pohjois-Suomi	Oulun Reipas	Nelonen	* *	
OuTa	Oulu	Pohjois-Suomi	Oulun Tarmo	Nelonen	* *	
OViesti	Otava, Mikkeli	Kaakkois-Suomi	Otavan Viesti	Vitonen	*	
