= List of football clubs in Finland – M =

This is a list of football clubs in Finland.

== League listings ==
- Championship - Veikkausliiga
- Division 1 - Ykkönen
- Division 2 - Kakkonen
- Division 3 - Kolmonen
- Division 4 - Nelonen
- Division 5 - Vitonen
- Division 6 - Kutonen
- Division 7 - Seiska

== Alphabetical listings ==
Contents: A B C D E F G H I J K L M N O P Q R S T U V W X Y Z Å Ä Ö

=== M ===
Abbreviation	Settlement	District	Official Name	Division	Cup	Other information
MaKu/Baltika	Helsinki	Helsinki	Marmiksen Kuula / Baltika	Nelonen	* *	
MaKu/Legends	Pihlajamäki	Helsinki	Marmiksen Kuula / Legends	Vitonen	*	
MaKu/Nelonen	Pihlajamäki	Helsinki	Marmiksen Kuula / Nelonen	Vitonen	*	
Malax IF	Malax (Maalahti)	Vaasa	Malax Idrottsförening	Vitonen	* *	Tier 3 (1 season): 1999
Malax IF /2	Malax (Maalahti')	Vaasa	Malax Idrottsförening / 2	Kutonen	*	
MaPS	Masku	Turku	Maskun Palloseura	Kakkonen	*	Tier 3 (6 seasons): 1999, 2003-07
MaPS 2	Masku	Turku	Maskun Palloseura / 2	Nelonen	*	
MasKi	Masala, Kirkkonummi	Uusimaa	Masalan Kisa	Kolmonen	* *	
MasKi 2	Masala, Kirkkonummi	Uusimaa	Masalan Kisa / 2	Kutonen	*	
MesTo	Tampere	Tampere	Messukylän Toverit	No record	*	Tier 2 (1 season): 1963
MIFK	Mariehamn	Åland	Idrottsföreningen Kamraterna i Mariehamn	Veikkausliiga	* * *	Tier 1 (7 seasons): 2005- Tier 2 (4 seasons): 1972, 1977–78, 2004; Tier 3 (21 seasons): 1976, 1979–83, 1985–86, 1989–90, 1993-2003
MiKi	Mikkeli	Kaakkois-Suomi	Mikkelin Kissat	Kolmonen	*	Previous names: MiPK Mikkeli until 1983; MiKi Mikkeli from 1984 to 1998 and since 2002; MiPa Mikkeli from 1999 to 2001; see also FC Mikkeli; Tier 1 (11 seasons): 1962–64, 1971, 1974–79, 1981; Tier 2 (13 seasons): 1959–61, 1965–70, 1972–73, 1980, 1982; Tier 3 (14 seasons): 1983, 1987–88, 1994–2000, 2002, 2004–05, 2007
MInto	Merikarvia	Satakunta	Merikarvian Into	Vitonen	*	
MiPa	Mikkeli	Kaakkois-Suomi	Mikkelin Pallo	No record	*	See MiKi Mikkeli
MiPK	Mikkeli	Kaakkois-Suomi	Mikkelin Pallo-Kissat	No record	*	See MiKi Mikkeli
MKV	Turku	Turku	Maarian Kisa-Veikot	No record	*	See TuKV Turku
MoNsa	Montola, Lappeenranta	Kaakkois-Suomi	Montolan Nuorisoseura	Vitonen	*	
MoPo	Helsinki	Helsinki	Jalkapalloseura Mooseksen Potku	Seiska	*	
MouMa	Mouhijärvi, Sastamala	Tampere	Mouhijärven V- ja U-seura Malli	Kutonen	*	
MP	Mikkeli	Kaakkois-Suomi	Mikkelin Palloilijat	Ykkönen	* * *	Previous names: MP Mikkeli until 1998 and since 2002; FC Mikkeli from 1999 to 2001 (merger with MiKi Mikkeli); Tier 1 (25 seasons): 1966–77, 1981, 1984, 1986-96; Tier 2 (22 seasons): 1939, 1960–65, 1978–80, 1982–83, 1985, 1997–2001, 2004–06, 2010; Tier 3 (6 seasons): 2002–03, 2007–09, 2011
MPR	Kuopio	Itä-Suomi	Manhattan Project	Nelonen	* *	
MPS	Malmi	Helsinki	Malmin Palloseura	Kolmonen	* *	Tier 2 (2 seasons): 1962-63; Tier 3 (10 seasons): 1993–96, 1998–99, 2001, 2006–07, 2011
MPS/2	Malmi	Helsinki	Malmin Palloseura / 2	Vitonen	* *	
MPS/4	Malmi	Helsinki	Malmin Palloseura / 4	Kutonen	*	
MPS/Atletico Akatemia	Malmi	Helsinki	Malmin Palloseura / Atletico Akatemia	Seiska	*	
MPS / Atletico Malmi	Malmi	Helsinki	Malmin Palloseura / Atletico Malmi	Kolmonen	* *	
MPS/Old Stars	Malmi	Helsinki	Malmin Palloseura / Old Stars	Nelonen	*	
MU	Mäntsälä	Uusimaa	Mäntsälän Urheilijat	Vitonen	*	
MuhU	Muhos	Pohjois-Suomi	Muhoksen Urheilijat	Vitonen	*	
MultiAnts	Multia	Keski-Suomi	MultiAnts	Vitonen	*	
MunU	Munsala, Nykarleby (Uusikaarlepyy)	Keski-Pohjanmaa	Munsala United	Vitonen	* *	
MuSa	Pori	Satakunta	Musan Salama	Kolmonen	* * *	Tier 2 (5 seasons): 1972, 1976, 1999-2001; Tier 3 (19 seasons): 1973–75, 1977–78, 1984, 1987–89, 1995, 1997–98, 2002–05, 2007, 2010-
MuSa 2	Pori	Satakunta	Musan Salama / 2	Kolmonen	*	
MuSa 3	Pori	Satakunta	Musan Salama / 3	Vitonen	*	
Mustarastas	Jyväskylä	Keski-Suomi	FC Blackbird / Mustarastas	Vitonen	*	
MyMy	Myrskylä	Uusimaa	Myrskylän Myrsky	Kutonen	* *	
MynPa	Mynämäki	Turku	Mynämäen Pallo-53	Nelonen	* *	
MynPa 2	Mynämäki	Turku	Mynämäen Pallo-53 / 2	Kutonen	*	
MyPa-47	Anjalankoski, Kouvola	Kaakkois-Suomi	Myllykosken Pallo –47	Veikkausliiga	* * *	Tier 1 (21 seasons): 1975, 1992- Tier 2 (18 seasons): 1970–74, 1976–81, 1985-91; Tier 3 (3 seasons): 1982-84
MyPa-86	Anjalankoski, Kouvola	Kaakkois-Suomi	Myllykosken Pallo-86	No record	*	Tier 3 (2 seasons): 1992-93
MYPASSION FC	Myllykoski, Kouvola	Kaakkois-Suomi	MYPASSION FC	Kutonen	*	
MäJä	Mäntyharju	Kaakkois-Suomi	Mäntyharjun Jäntevä	Kutonen	* *	
MäKi	Mäntyluoto, Pori	Satakunta	Mäntyluodon Kiri	Vitonen	*	
