= List of football clubs in Finland – J =

This is a list of football clubs in Finland.

== League listings ==
- Championship - Veikkausliiga
- Division 1 - Ykkönen
- Division 2 - Kakkonen
- Division 3 - Kolmonen
- Division 4 - Nelonen
- Division 5 - Vitonen
- Division 6 - Kutonen
- Division 7 - Seiska

== Alphabetical listings ==
Contents: A B C D E F G H I J K L M N O P Q R S T U V W X Y Z Å Ä Ö

=== J ===
Abbreviation	Settlement	District	Official Name	Division	Cup	Other information
Jags	Hämeenlinna	Tampere	Jukola Jaguars	Vitonen	*	
Jags 2	Hämeenlinna	Tampere	Jukola Jaguars / 2	Kutonen	*	
Jalas	Jalasjärvi	Vaasa	Jalasjärven Jalas	Kutonen	*	
JaVo	Jaala, Kouvola	Kaakkois-Suomi	Jaalan Voima	Kutonen	*	
JIK	Jomala, Åland	Åland	Jomala IK	Vitonen	*	
JBK	Jakobstad	Keski-Pohjanmaa	Jakobstads Bollklubb	Kolmonen	* * *	
JIlves	Jämsänkoski	Keski-Suomi	Jämsänkosken Ilves	Kakkonen	* *	
JIlves II	Jämsänkoski	Keski-Suomi	Jämsänkosken Ilves / II	Vitonen	*	
JIPPO	Joensuu	Itä-Suomi	JIPPO	Ykkönen	* * *	
JIPPO 2	Joensuu	Itä-Suomi	JIPPO / 2	Kolmonen	* *	
JJK	Jyväskylä	Keski-Suomi	Jyväskylän Jalkapalloklubi	Veikkausliiga	* * *	
JJ Vepo	Jakomäki	Helsinki	JJ Velttopotku	Seiska	*	
JK Bulls	Imatra	Kaakkois-Suomi	JK Bulls Imatra	Vitonen	*	
JoKi	Jokela	Uusimaa	Jokelan Kisa	Nelonen	* *	
Jokerit FC	Helsinki	Helsinki	Jokerit Football Club	Vitonen	* *	
JoPS	Joensuu	Itä-Suomi	Joensuun Palloseura	Kakkonen	* *	
JoPS/2	Joensuu	Itä-Suomi	Joensuun Palloseura / 2	Nelonen	* *	
JoSePa	Joutsa	Keski-Suomi	Joutsan Seudun Pallo	Vitonen	*	
JP13	Helsinki	Helsinki	JP13	Kutonen	*	
JPS	Jyväskylä	Keski-Suomi	Jyväskylän Seudun Palloseura	Kolmonen	* *	
JS Hercules	Oulu	Pohjois-Suomi	Jalkapalloseura Hercules	Kolmonen	* *	
Juhlahevoset	Helsinki	Helsinki	FC Juhlahevoset	Kutonen	* *	
JuPS	Juuka	Itä-Suomi	Juuan Palloseura	Nelonen	* *	
JuPy	Juankoski	Itä-Suomi	Juankosken Pyrkivä	Vitonen	*	
Jurva-70	Jurva	Vaasa	Jurva-70	Kutonen	* *	
Jyske	Laitila	Turku	Laitilan Jyske	Vitonen	*	
JyTy	Turku	Turku	Jyrkkälän Tykit	Kolmonen	* *	
Jäntevä	Kotka	Kaakkois-Suomi	Kotkan Jäntevä	Kolmonen	*	
Jäntevä Ukot	Kotka	Kaakkois-Suomi	Jäntevä Ukot	Vitonen	*	
Jäppärä	Järvelä, Kärkölä	Uusimaa	Järvelän Jäppärä	Kutonen	*	
JäPS	Järvenpää	Uusimaa	Järvenpään Palloseura	Kakkonen	* * *	
JäPS M2	Järvenpää	Uusimaa	Järvenpään Palloseura / M2	Vitonen	* *	
JäPS 3	Järvenpää	Uusimaa	Järvenpään Palloseura / 3	Kutonen	*	
