= List of football clubs in Finland – L =

This is a list of football clubs in Finland.

== League listings ==
- Championship - Veikkausliiga
- Division 1 - Ykkönen
- Division 2 - Kakkonen
- Division 3 - Kolmonen
- Division 4 - Nelonen
- Division 5 - Vitonen
- Division 6 - Kutonen
- Division 7 - Seiska

== Alphabetical listings ==
Contents: A B C D E F G H I J K L M N O P Q R S T U V W X Y Z Å Ä Ö

=== L ===
Abbreviation	Settlement	District	Official name	Division	Cup	Other information
Lahen Pojat JS	Lahti	Uusimaa	Lahen Pojat Jalkapalloseura	Vitonen	* *	
LaPa-95	Lapinlahti	Itä-Suomi	Lapinlahden Pallo-95	Nelonen	*	
LaPe	Lappeenranta	Kaakkois-Suomi	LAUTP (Lauritsalan Työväen Palloilijat) / Lappeen Pelurit	Vitonen	*	
Lappee JK	Lappeenranta	Kaakkois-Suomi	Lappeen Jalkapalloklubi	Nelonen	*	
LaPro	Lamminpää	Tampere	Lamminpään Pallopeli Projekti	Vitonen	*	
LauttaPallo	Lauttasaari	Helsinki	Lauttasaaren Pallo	Kutonen	* *	
LaVe	Lammi, Hämeenlinna	Tampere	Lammin Veto	Nelonen	* *	
LBK	Larsmo (Luoto)	Keski-Pohjanmaa	Larsmo Bollklubb	Nelonen	*	
LehPa	Lehmo, Kontiolahti	Itä-Suomi	Lehmon Pallo-77	Nelonen	* *	
LehPa/2	Lehmo, Kontiolahti	Itä-Suomi	Lehmon Pallo-77 / 2	Vitonen	*	
LeJa	Helsinki	Helsinki	Levottomat Jalat	Kutonen	*	
LeJy	Lehtimäki, Alajärvi	Vaasa	Lehtimäen Jyske	Kutonen	* *	
LeKi-futis	Lempäälä	Tampere	LeKi-futis Lempäälän Palloseura	Vitonen	* *	
LePa	Leppävaara, Espoo	Uusimaa	Leppävaaran Pallo	Vitonen	*	
LePa 2	Leppävaara, Espoo	Uusimaa	Leppävaaran Pallo / 2	Kutonen	*	
LeTo AC	Lempäälä	Tampere	Lempäälän Toivot / AC	Kutonen	*	
Lieto	Lieto	Turku	Liedon Pallo	Nelonen	* *	
Lieto 2	Lieto	Turku	Liedon Pallo / 2	Vitonen	* *	
Lieto 3	Lieto	Turku	Liedon Pallo / 3	Kutonen	*	
LIK	Liljendal, Loviisa	Kaakkois-Suomi	Liljendal Idrottsklubb	Vitonen	*	
LiPa	Kuopio	Itä-Suomi	Liitosalueen Pallo	Vitonen	*	
LiPa/2	Kuopio	Itä-Suomi	Liitosalueen Pallo / 2	Vitonen	*	
LiRy	Lappeenranta	Kaakkois-Suomi	Lappeenrannan Itäinen Raittiusyhdistys	Kutonen	*	
LLuja	Huittinen	Satakunta	Lauttakylän Luja	Vitonen	*	
LoPa	Lohja	Uusimaa	Lohjan Pallo	Kakkonen	* * *	
Loiske	Sääksjärvi, Lempäälä	Tampere	Sääksjärven Loiske	Nelonen	* *	Also known as Loiske Toivot.
LoPS	Loimaa	Turku	Loimaan Palloseura	Kutonen	* *	
LoVe	Lohtaja, Kokkola	Keski-Pohjanmaa	Lohtajan Veikot	Nelonen	*	
LPK	Jyväskylä	Keski-Suomi	Lohikosken Pallokerho	Nelonen	*	
LPS	Laajasalo	Helsinki	Laajasalon Palloseura	Kakkonen	* * *	
LPS/2	Laajasalo	Helsinki	Laajasalon Palloseura / 2	Kutonen	*	
LPS/Kuninkaat	Laajasalo	Helsinki	Laajasalon Palloseura / Kuninkaat	Nelonen	*	
LTU	Littoinen, Lieto	Turku	Littoisten Työväen Urheilijat	Kolmonen	* *	
LTU 2	Littoinen	Turku	Littoisten Työväen Urheilijat / 2	Vitonen	*	
LTU 3	Littoinen	Turku	Littoisten Työväen Urheilijat / 3	Kutonen	*	
Luja	Laihia	Vaasa	Laihian Luja	Vitonen	* *	
LuPo	Luumäki	Kaakkois-Suomi	Luumäen Pojat	Kutonen	*	
LuVe	Luvia	Satakunta	Luvian Veto	Nelonen	* *	
LuVe2	Luvia	Satakunta	Luvian Veto /2	Vitonen	*	
