= List of football clubs in Finland – N =

This is a list of football clubs in Finland.

== League listings ==
- Championship - Veikkausliiga
- Division 1 - Ykkönen
- Division 2 - Kakkonen
- Division 3 - Kolmonen
- Division 4 - Nelonen
- Division 5 - Vitonen
- Division 6 - Kutonen
- Division 7 - Seiska

== Alphabetical listings ==
Contents: A B C D E F G H I J K L M N O P Q R S T U V W X Y Z Å Ä Ö

=== N ===
Abbreviation	Settlement	District	Official name	Division	Cup	Other information
Nagu IF	Nagu	Turku	Nagu Idrottsförening RF	Vitonen	* *	
NaKa	Lappeenranta	Kaakkois-Suomi	Jalkapalloseura NaKa (Namut Kassit)	Vitonen	* *	
Naseva	Nastola	Uusimaa	Nastolan Naseva	Vitonen	* *	
Nasta	Nakkila	Satakunta	Nakkilan Nasta	Kutonen	* *	
NePa	Nekala	Tampere	Nekalan Pallo	Kolmonen	* *	
NIK	Nykarleby	Keski-Pohjanmaa	Nykarleby Idrottsklubb	Nelonen	* *	
NJS	Nurmijärvi	Uusimaa	Nurmijärven Jalkapalloseura	Kolmonen	* *	
NJS 2	Klaukkala, Nurmijärvi	Uusimaa	Nurmijärven Jalkapalloseura / 2	Vitonen	* *	
No Stars	Kokkola	Keski-Pohjanmaa	No Stars	Nelonen	*	
NoPS	Nokia	Tampere	Nokian Palloseura	Kolmonen	* *	
NoPS /2	Nokia	Tampere	Nokian Palloseura / 2	Kutonen	*	
Nopsa	Nastola	Uusimaa	Nastolan Nopsa	Kolmonen	* *	
NoPy	Nokia	Tampere	Nokian Pyry	Vitonen	* *	
Norrvalla FF	Vörå	Vaasa	Norrvalla Fotbollsförening	Kolmonen	* *	
Norrvalla FF /2	Vörå	Vaasa	Norrvalla Fotbollsförening / 2	Kutonen	*	
NouLa	Järvenpää	Uusimaa	Nouseva Laaka	Kolmonen	* *	
NouLa AiVa	Järvenpää	Uusimaa	Nouseva Laaka / AiVa	Kutonen	*	
NouLa Huilii	Järvenpää	Uusimaa	Nouseva Laaka / Huilii	Kutonen	*	
Nousu	Jyväskylä	Keski-Suomi	Jyväskylän Nousu	Vitonen	*	
NP-H	Nilsiä	Itä-Suomi	Nilsiän Pallo-Haukat	Vitonen	*	
NuPa	Nurmo, Seinäjoki	Vaasa	Nurmon Pallo	Nelonen	* *	
NuPa /HyMy	Nurmo / Hyllykallio, Seinäjoki	Vaasa	Nurmon Pallo / Hyllykallion Myrsky	Kutonen	*	
NuPS	Nummela, Vihti	Uusimaa	Nummelan Palloseura	Kolmonen	* *	
NuPS Reservi	Nummela, Vihti	Uusimaa	Nummelan Palloseura / Reservi	Nelonen	*	
