= List of football clubs in Finland – V =

This is a list of football clubs in Finland.

== League listings ==
- Championship - Veikkausliiga
- Division 1 - Ykkönen
- Division 2 - Kakkonen
- Division 3 - Kolmonen
- Division 4 - Nelonen
- Division 5 - Vitonen
- Division 6 - Kutonen
- Division 7 - Seiska

== Alphabetical listings ==
Contents: A B C D E F G H I J K L M N O P Q R S T U V W X Y Z Å Ä Ö

=== V ===
Abbreviation	Settlement	District	Official name	Division	Cup	Other information
VaKP	Valkeakoski	Tampere	Valkeakosken Koskenpojat	Vitonen	* *	
Valo	Mänttä-Vilppula	Tampere	Mäntän Valo	Vitonen	*	
Valtti	Puotinkylä	Helsinki	Puotinkylän Valtti	Vitonen	*	
VAP	Vantaa	Uusimaa	Vantaan Palloseura VAP -09	Kutonen	*	
Vatanspor	Helsinki	Helsinki	Vatanspor	Kutonen	*	
VehU	Vehmainen	Tampere	Vehmaisten Urheilijat	Kutonen	*	
Veijarit	Helsinki	Helsinki	Veijarit	Kutonen	*	
Vesa	Töölö	Helsinki	Töölön Vesa	Nelonen	* *	
Vesa/Stadi	Töölö	Helsinki	Töölön Vesa / Stadi	Seiska	*	
Vesa/Töölö	Töölö	Helsinki	Töölön Vesa	Vitonen	*	
VesVi	Vesilahti	Tampere	Vesilahden Visa	Kutonen	*	
VetU	Veteli	Keski-Pohjanmaa	Vetelin Urheilijat	Kutonen	*	
VeVe	Veikkola, Kirkkonummi	Uusimaa	Veikkolan Veikot	Vitonen	*	
VG-62	Naantali	Turku	VG-62 Naantali	Kolmonen	* *	
VIFK	Vaasa	Vaasa	Idrottsföreningen Kamraterna Vasa	Kakkonen	* * *	
VIFK Motion	Vaasa	Vaasa	Idrottsföreningen Kamraterna Vasa / Motion	Kutonen	*	
VIFK U	Vaasa (Vasa)	Vaasa	Idrottsföreningen Kamraterna Vasa Utveckling	Nelonen	*	
ViiPV	Viiala, Akaa	Tampere	Viialan Peli-Veikot	Vitonen	* *	
VilTe	Viljakkala, Ylöjärvi	Tampere	Viljakkalan Teräs	Kutonen	*	
ViPa	Vihtavuori, Laukaa	Keski-Suomi	Vihtavuoren Pamaus	Kakkonen	* *	
Virkiä	Lapua	Vaasa	Lapuan Virkiä	Kolmonen	* *	
Virkiä/2	Lapua	Vaasa	Lapuan Virkiä / 2	Kutonen	* *	
ViSa	Virolahti	Kaakkois-Suomi	Vesilahden Visa	Vitonen	*	
ViTa	Virkkala, Lohja	Uusimaa	Virkkalan Tarmo	Vitonen	*	
VJK	Viitasaari	Keski-Suomi	Viitasaaren Jalkapalloklubi	Vitonen	* *	
VJS	Vantaa	Uusimaa	Vantaan Jalkapalloseura	Nelonen	* *	
VKajo	Valkeala, Kouvola	Kaakkois-Suomi	Valkealan Kajo	Vitonen	* *	
VoPpK	Voikkaa, Kouvola	Kaakkois-Suomi	Voikkaan Potkupallo Kerho	Kutonen	* *	
VPS	Vaasa	Vaasa	Vaasan Palloseura	Veikkausliiga	* * *	
VPS-j	Vaasa	Vaasa	Vaasan Palloseuran Juniorit	Nelonen	* *	
Väsymättömät	Kaustinen	Keski-Pohjanmaa	Team Väsymättömät	Kutonen	*	
VäVi	Vähäkyrö	Vaasa	Vähänkyrön Viesti	Vitonen	* *	
VäVi/2	Vähäkyrö	Vaasa	Vähänkyrön Viesti / 2	Kutonen	*	
