= List of football clubs in Finland – R =

This is a list of football clubs in Finland.

== League listings ==
- Championship - Veikkausliiga
- Division 1 - Ykkönen
- Division 2 - Kakkonen
- Division 3 - Kolmonen
- Division 4 - Nelonen
- Division 5 - Vitonen
- Division 6 - Kutonen
- Division 7 - Seiska

== Alphabetical listings ==
Contents: A B C D E F G H I J K L M N O P Q R S T U V W X Y Z Å Ä Ö

=== R ===
Abbreviation	Settlement	District	Official name	Division	Cup	Other information
Rai-Fu	Raisio	Turku	Raisio-Futis	Kutonen	*	
Raiku	Rautavaara, Joensuu	Itä-Suomi	Rautavaaran Raiku	Vitonen	*	
RaiTeePee	Raisio	Turku	Raision Työväen Palloilijat	Vitonen	* *	
RautU	Rautalampi	Itä-Suomi	Rautalammin Urheilijat	Nelonen	*	
Reima	Kokkola	Keski-Pohjanmaa	Ykspihlajan Reima	Kolmonen	* *	
Reima II	Ykspihlaja, Kokkola	Keski-Pohjanmaa	Ykspihlajan Reima / II	Vitonen	*	
ReKu	Reposaari, Pori	Satakunta	Reposaaren Kunto	Vitonen	*	
RePa-93	Rekola, Vantaa	Uusimaa	Rekolan Pallo -93	Vitonen	*	
RIlves	Riihimäki	Uusimaa	Riihimäen Ilves	No record	* *	
RIlves 2	Riihimäki	Uusimaa	Riihimäen Ilves / 2	No record	*	
RiPa	Ristiina	Kaakkois-Suomi	Ristiinan Pallo	Vitonen	* *	
RiPa/2	Ristiina	Kaakkois-Suomi	Ristiinan Pallo / 2	Kutonen	*	
RiPS	Riihimäki	Uusimaa	Riihimäen Palloseura	Kolmonen	* *	Reformed in 2011 taking the place of RIlves.
RiRa	Vantaa	Uusimaa	Riipilän Raketti	Kolmonen	* *	
RiRa Ug	Riipilä, Vantaa	Uusimaa	Riipilän Raketti / Ug	Kutonen	* *	RiRa/2
RiRa Ug 09	Riipilä, Vantaa	Uusimaa	Riipilän Raketti / Ug 09	Kutonen	*	
RiSa	Riihimäki	Uusimaa	Riihimäen Sarvet	Vitonen	*	
Riverball	Joensuu	Itä-Suomi	Riverball	Vitonen	*	
RoPS	Rovaniemi	Pohjois-Suomi	Rovaniemi Palloseura	Ykkönen	* * *	
RoU	Roihuvuori	Helsinki	Roihuvuoren Urheilijat	Vitonen	*	
RoU/Naamiomiehet	Siltamäki	Helsinki	Roihuvuoren Urheilijat / FC Naamiomiehet	Seiska	*	
RPS Lions	Ruokolahti	Kaakkois-Suomi	Ruokolahden Palloseura / Lions	Kutonen	*	
RT-88	Ruskeasanta, Vantaa	Uusimaa	Ruskeasannan Tykitys -88	Kutonen	* *	
Ruila	Helsinki	Helsinki	Ruila	Seiska	*	
Ruisku	Roihuvuori	Helsinki	Roihuvuoren Ruisku	Kutonen	*	
Ruisku/09	Roihuvuori	Helsinki	Roihuvuoren Ruisku / 09	Kutonen	*	
RuosV	Ruosniemi, Pori	Satakunta	Ruosniemen Visa		*	
Ruutupaidat	Sundom, Vaasa	Vaasa	Ruutupaidat	Kutonen	*	
Ryhti	Raisio	Turku	Raision Ryhti	Vitonen	*	
RyPK-84	Rytimäki, Kokkola	Keski-Pohjanmaa	Rytimäen Pallokerho -84	Vitonen	*	
