= List of football clubs in Finland – U =

This is a list of football clubs in Finland.

== League listings ==
- Championship - Veikkausliiga
- Division 1 - Ykkönen
- Division 2 - Kakkonen
- Division 3 - Kolmonen
- Division 4 - Nelonen
- Division 5 - Vitonen
- Division 6 - Kutonen
- Division 7 - Seiska

== Alphabetical listings ==
Contents: A B C D E F G H I J K L M N O P Q R S T U V W X Y Z Å Ä Ö

=== U ===
Abbreviation	Settlement	District	Official Name	Division	Cup	Other information
UPK	Uusikaupunki	Turku	Uudenkaupungin Pallokerho	Nelonen	*	
Ura	Kannus	Keski-Pohjanmaa	Kannuksen Ura	Kutonen	*	
Urho	Suolahti, Äänekoski	Keski-Suomi	Suolahden Urho	Vitonen	*	
UrPS	Urjala	Tampere	Urjalan Palloseura	Vitonen	* *	
