= List of football clubs in Finland – E =

This is a list of football clubs in Finland.

== League listings ==
- Championship - Veikkausliiga
- Division 1 - Ykkönen
- Division 2 - Kakkonen
- Division 3 - Kolmonen
- Division 4 - Nelonen
- Division 5 - Vitonen
- Division 6 - Kutonen
- Division 7 - Seiska

== Alphabetical listings ==
Contents: A B C D E F G H I J K L M N O P Q R S T U V W X Y Z Å Ä Ö

=== E ===
Abbreviation	Settlement	District	Official Name	Division	Cup	Other information
EBK	Espoo	Uusimaa	Esbo Bollklubb	Kolmonen	* *	
EBK 2	Espoo	Uusimaa	Esbo Bollklubb / 2	Nelonen	*	
Ehawks	Espoo	Uusimaa	Espoo Hawks	Vitonen	*	
EHP	Etelä-Haaga	Helsinki	EHP (Etelä-Haagan Pallo)	Kutonen	*	
EIF	Raseborg	Uusimaa	Ekenäs Idrottsförening	Kolmonen	* * *	
EIF Akademi	Raseborg	Uusimaa	Ekenäs Idrottsförening / Akademi	Kolmonen	* *	
E-KI	Kuopio	Itä-Suomi	Etelä-Kuopion Ilves	Vitonen	*	
Ellas	Helsinki	Helsinki	FC Ellas Helsinki	Vitonen	* *	
Ellas/FC Aztecas	Helsinki	Helsinki	FC Ellas / Club de Futbol Aztecas	Seiska	*	
EPS	Espoo	Uusimaa	Espoon Palloseuran Jalkapallo	Nelonen	* *	
EPS 2	Espoo	Uusimaa	Espoon Palloseuran Jalkapallo / 2	Vitonen	*	
EPS RPS	Espoo	Uusimaa	Espoon Palloseuran Jalkapallo / RPS	Kutonen	*	
EsPa	Espoo	Uusimaa	Etelä-Espoon Pallo	Kakkonen	* *	
Esse IK	Esse (Ähtävä), Pedersöre	Keski-Pohjanmaa	Esse Idrottsklubb	Nelonen	* *	
Esse IK II	Esse (Ähtävä), Pedersöre	Keski-Pohjanmaa	Esse Idrottsklubb / II	Vitonen	* *	
Esse IK III	Esse (Ähtävä), Pedersöre	Keski-Pohjanmaa	Esse Idrottsklubb / III	Kutonen	*	
EuPa	Eura	Satakunta	Euran Pallo	Kolmonen	* *	
EuPa2	Eura	Satakunta	Euran Pallo 2	Nelonen	* *	
