= List of football clubs in Finland – C =

This is a list of football clubs in Finland.

== League listings ==
- Championship – Veikkausliiga
- Division 1 – Ykkönen
- Division 2 – Kakkonen
- Division 3 – Kolmonen
- Division 4 – Nelonen
- Division 5 – Vitonen
- Division 6 – Kutonen
- Division 7 – Seiska

== Alphabetical listings ==
Contents: A B C D E F G H I J K L M N O P Q R S T U V W X Y Z Å Ä Ö

=== C ===
Abbreviation	Settlement	District	Official Name	Division	Cup	Other information
Canona	Helsinki	Helsinki	Cantona	Seiska	*	
Cantona	Helsinki	Helsinki	Cantona	Seiska	*	
CELT'S	Turku	Turku	Castle Celtics	Kutonen	*	
City	Tampere	Tampere	Norsulauma FC	Kutonen	*	
City Stars	Lahti	Uusimaa	FC Kuusysi / City Stars	Kakkonen	* * *	
Club Latino Espanol	Helsinki	Helsinki	Club Latino Espanol	Seiska	* *	
Colo-Colo/DOS	Helsinki	Helsinki	Club Colo-Colo / DOS	Seiska	* *	
Colo-Colo/UNO	Töölö	Helsinki	Colo-Colo / UNO	Vitonen	* *	
Cosmos	Helsinki	Helsinki	Cosmos	Kutonen	*	
