= List of football clubs in Finland – W =

This is a list of football clubs in Finland.

== League listings ==
- Championship - Veikkausliiga
- Division 1 - Ykkönen
- Division 2 - Kakkonen
- Division 3 - Kolmonen
- Division 4 - Nelonen
- Division 5 - Vitonen
- Division 6 - Kutonen
- Division 7 - Seiska

== Alphabetical listings ==
Contents: A B C D E F G H I J K L M N O P Q R S T U V W X Y Z Å Ä Ö

=== W ===
Abbreviation	Settlement	District	Official name	Division	Cup	Other information
Warkaus JK	Varkaus	Itä-Suomi	Warkauden Jalkapalloklubi	Kakkonen	* * *	
Warkaus JK/2	Varkaus	Itä-Suomi	Warkauden Jalkapalloklubi / 2	Nelonen	*	
WäSy	Helsinki	Helsinki	Wäinämöisen Syke	Vitonen	*	
Wilpas	Salo	Turku	Salon Vilpas	Kolmonen	* *	
Wilpas 2	Salo	Turku	Salon Vilpas / 2	Vitonen	*	
Wilpas 3	Salo	Turku	Salon Vilpas / 3	Kutonen	*	
