= List of football clubs in Finland – B =

This is a list of football clubs in Finland.

== League listings ==
- Championship - Veikkausliiga
- Division 1 - Ykkönen
- Division 2 - Kakkonen
- Division 3 - Kolmonen
- Division 4 - Nelonen
- Division 5 - Vitonen
- Division 6 - Kutonen
- Division 7 - Seiska

== Alphabetical listings ==
Contents: A B C D E F G H I J K L M N O P Q R S T U V W X Y Z Å Ä Ö

=== B ===
Abbreviation	Settlement	District	Official name	Division	Cup	Other information
BET	Jyväskylä	Keski-Suomi	Blue Eyes Team	Kolmonen	* *	
BFB	Piikkiö	Turku	BFB Piikkiö	Vitonen	*	
BK-46	Raseborg	Uusimaa	Bollklubben-46	Kakkonen	* * *	
BK-46 Nk02	Raseborg	Uusimaa	Bollklubben-46 / Nk02	Vitonen	*	
BK-48	Vaasa	Vaasa	Bollklubben-48rf	Kutonen	* *	
Black Islanders	Korsholm (Mustasaari)	Vaasa	Black Islanders	Kutonen	* *	
Buster	Espoo	Uusimaa	Football Club Buster	Kutonen	*	
