= List of football clubs in Finland – G =

This is a list of football clubs in Finland.

== League listings ==
- Championship - Veikkausliiga
- Division 1 - Ykkönen
- Division 2 - Kakkonen
- Division 3 - Kolmonen
- Division 4 - Nelonen
- Division 5 - Vitonen
- Division 6 - Kutonen
- Division 7 - Seiska

== Alphabetical listings ==
Contents: A B C D E F G H I J K L M N O P Q R S T U V W X Y Z Å Ä Ö

=== G ===
Abbreviation	Settlement	District	Official Name	Division	Cup	Other information
GBK	Kokkola	Keski-Pohjanmaa	Gamlakarleby Bollklubb	Kakkonen	* * *	
GBK II	Kokkola	Keski-Pohjanmaa	Gamlakarleby Bollklubb / II	Kolmonen	* *	
GBK III	Kokkola	Keski-Pohjanmaa	Gamlakarleby Bollklubb / III	Kutonen	*	
Geishan Pallo	Helsinki	Helsinki	Geishan Pallo	Vitonen	*	
Geishan Pallo/Pallo	Helsinki	Helsinki	Geishan Pallo / Pallo	Kutonen	*	
Gnistan	Helsinki	Helsinki	Idrottsföreningen Gnistan	Kakkonen	* * *	
Gnistan/2	Oulunkylä	Helsinki	Idrottsföreningen Gnistan / 2	Nelonen	* *	
Gnistan/Ogeli	Oulunkylä	Helsinki	Idrottsföreningen Gnistan / Ogeli	Nelonen	* *	
Gnistan/Roots	Oulunkylä	Helsinki	Idrottsföreningen Gnistan / Roots	Kutonen	*	
GrIFK	Kauniainen	Uusimaa	Grankulla Idrottsförening Kamraterna	Kakkonen	* * *	
GrIFK 2	Kauniainen	Uusimaa	Grankulla Idrottsförening Kamraterna / 2	Kutonen	*	
Grumset	Helsinki	Helsinki	Grumset	Kutonen	*	
