= List of football clubs in Finland – Z =

This is a list of football clubs in Finland.

== League listings ==
- Championship - Veikkausliiga
- Division 1 - Ykkönen
- Division 2 - Kakkonen
- Division 3 - Kolmonen
- Division 4 - Nelonen
- Division 5 - Vitonen
- Division 6 - Kutonen
- Division 7 - Seiska

== Alphabetical listings ==
Contents: A B C D E F G H I J K L M N O P Q R S T U V W X Y Z Å Ä Ö

=== Z ===
Abbreviation	Settlement	District	Official name	Division	Cup	Other information
Zenith	Myllypuro	Helsinki	Zenith Myllypuro	Nelonen	* *	
Zoom	Helsinki	Helsinki	Zoom	Kutonen	*	
Zulimanit	Kuopio	Itä-Suomi	Soccer Club Zulimanit	Kolmonen	* *	
Zulimanit/PappaZulut	Kuopio	Itä-Suomi	Soccer Club Zulimanit / PappaZulut	Vitonen	*	
Zyklon	Helsinki	Helsinki	Jalkapalloseura Zyklon	No record	*	Last record Kolmonen in 2009.
