= List of football clubs in Finland – D =

This is a list of football clubs in Finland beginning with the letter D.

== League listings ==
- Championship - Veikkausliiga
- Division 1 - Ykkönen
- Division 2 - Kakkonen
- Division 3 - Kolmonen
- Division 4 - Nelonen
- Division 5 - Vitonen
- Division 6 - Kutonen
- Division 7 - Seiska

== Alphabetical listings ==
Contents: A B C D E F G H I J K L M N O P Q R S T U V W X Y Z Å Ä Ö

=== D ===
Abbreviation	Settlement	District	Official Name	Division	Cup	Other information
Dal	Helsinki	Helsinki	Football Club Dal	Kutonen	*	
Derius	Jokela	Uusimaa	Derius	Kutonen	*	
Dicken	Lauttasaari	Helsinki	Drumsö Idrottskamrater Dicken	Seiska	*	
DT-65	Vantaa	Uusimaa	Downtown 65	Kutonen	*	
Dynamo	Helsinki	Helsinki	Dynamo	Seiska	*	
Dynamo UTD	Tampere	Tampere	Dynamo UTD	Kutonen	*	
