= List of football clubs in Finland – Ä =

This is a list of football clubs in Finland.

== League listings ==
- Championship – Veikkausliiga
- Division 1 – Ykkönen
- Division 2 – Kakkonen
- Division 3 – Kolmonen
- Division 4 – Nelonen
- Division 5 – Vitonen
- Division 6 – Kutonen
- Division 7 – Seiska

== Alphabetical listings ==
Contents: A B C D E F G H I J K L M N O P Q R S T U V W X Y Z Å Ä Ö

=== Ä ===
Abbreviation	Settlement	District	Official name	Division	Cup	Other information
Huima	Äänekoski	Keski-Suomi	Äänekosken Huima	Kolmonen	*	
