= List of football clubs in Finland – Q =

This is a list of football clubs in Finland.

== League listings ==
- Championship - Veikkausliiga
- Division 1 - Ykkönen
- Division 2 - Kakkonen
- Division 3 - Kolmonen
- Division 4 - Nelonen
- Division 5 - Vitonen
- Division 6 - Kutonen
- Division 7 - Seiska

== Alphabetical listings ==
Contents: A B C D E F G H I J K L M N O P Q R S T U V W X Y Z Å Ä Ö

=== Q ===
No entries.
