= List of football clubs in Finland =

This is a list of football clubs in Finland.

== League listings ==
- Championship - Veikkausliiga
- Division 1 - Ykkösliiga
- Division 2 - Ykkönen
- Division 3 - Kakkonen
- Division 4 - Kolmonen
- Division 5 - Nelonen
- Division 6 - Vitonen
- Division 7 - Kutonen
- Division 8 - Seiska

== Alphabetical listings ==
Contents: A B C D E F G H I J K L M N O P Q R S T U V W X Y Z Å Ä Ö

=== A ===
Abbreviation	Settlement	District	Official Name	Division	Cup	Other information
ABC	Vaasa	Vaasa	Akademisk Boll Club	Vitonen	*	
ABC Oldboys	Vaasa	Vaasa	Akademisk Boll Club / Oldboys	Vitonen	*	
AC Balls	Helsinki	Helsinki	AC Balls	Seiska	*	
AC BARCA	Vartiala, Riistavesi	Itä-Suomi	AC BARCA	Vitonen	*	
AC Darra	Tampere	Tampere	Athletic Club Darra Tampere	Kutonen	*	
AC Goljat	Tampere	Tampere	AC Goljat	Kutonen	*	
AC JazzPa	Järvenpää	Uusimaa	AC JazzPa	Kutonen	*	
AC Juice	Tampere	Tampere	AC Juice	Kutonen	*	
AC Kajaani	Kajaani	Pohjois-Suomi	AC Kajaani	Kakkonen	* *	
AC Oulu	Oulu	Pohjois-Suomi	AC Oulu	Ykkönen	* * *	
AC Sauvo	Sauvo	Turku	Sauvon Urheilijat / AC Sauvo	Vitonen	*	
AC StaSi	Helsinki	Helsinki	AC Stadin Sissit	Vitonen	* *	
AC StaSi/Europort	Helsinki	Helsinki	AC Stadin Sissit / Europort	Kutonen	*	
AC Vantaa	Vantaa	Uusimaa	Jalkapalloseura Airport City	Kakkonen	* * *	
AC Vantaa 2	Vantaa	Uusimaa	Jalkapalloseura Airport City / 2	Vitonen	* *	
ACE	Tampere	Tampere	Tampereen Teekkareiden JP-kerho ACE	Vitonen	*	
AFC Campus	Turku	Turku	Academic Football Club Campus	Vitonen	*	
AFC EMU	Kurkimäki	Helsinki	Athletic Football Club EMU	Vitonen	* *	
AFC Keltik	Joensuu	Itä-Suomi	Amateur Football Club Keltik	Vitonen	* *	
Ajax	Sarkkiranta, Kempele	Pohjois-Suomi	Ajax Sarkkiranta	Nelonen	*	
Akilles	Porvoo	Uusimaa	Porvoon Akilles	Vitonen	*	
Allianssi	Vantaa	Uusimaa	Allianssi Vantaa	Nelonen	*	
AP	Espoo	Uusimaa	Aika-pallo	Kutonen	*	
Apassit	Kyröskoski, Hämeenkyrö	Tampere	Parkunmäen Apassit	Vitonen	* *	
Apassit /2	Kyröskoski, Hämeenkyrö	Tampere	Parkunmäen Apassit / 2	Kutonen	*	
Apollo	Hyvinkää	Uusimaa	Palloiluseura Apollo	Kutonen	* * *	
APV	Alavus	Vaasa	Alavuden Peli-Veikot	Kutonen	* *	
Ares-86	Hyvinkää	Uusimaa	Hyvinkään Ares -86	Kutonen	*	
ArPS	Arpela, Tornio	Pohjois-Suomi	Arpelan Palloseura	Nelonen	*	
Arsenal	Helsinki	Helsinki	Arsenal	Vitonen	*	
Arsenal/2	Helsinki	Helsinki	Arsenal / 2	Seiska	*	
AS KaWe	Kuopio	Itä-Suomi	AS KallaWesj	Vitonen	*	
AS Moon	Raahe	Pohjois-Suomi	AS Moon	Nelonen	*	
AskU	Askola	Uusimaa	Askolan Urheilijat	Kutonen	*	
AS-Team	Tampere	Tampere	AS-Team	Kutonen	*	
Atlantis FC	Helsinki	Helsinki	Atlantis FC Edustus	Kakkonen	* * *	
Atlantis FC/SOB	Helsinki	Helsinki	Atlantis FC / SOB	Seiska	*	
Atletico	Turku	Turku	Atletico Ispoinen	Vitonen	*	
Atomit	Loviisa	Kaakkois-Suomi	Atomit Loviisa	Vitonen	*	
AU	Alastaro, Loimaa	Turku	Alastaron Urheilijat	Kutonen	*	
