= Ikurin Vire =

Finnish football club

Vire
- Full name: Ikurin Vire
- Nickname(s): Blues
- Founded: 1957
- Ground: Ikurin Virelä, Tampere, Finland
- Capacity: 48
- Chairman: Jussi Lehtinen
- Manager: Petri Lamminpohja
- League: Kutonen
Home colours	Away colours

Ikurin Vire (abbreviated Vire) is a football club from Tampere, Finland that was established in 1957. Vire currently plays in the Kutonen with its home venue at the Ikurin Virelä.

== Divisional Movements ==
Seventh Level (3 seasons): 2011, 2012, 2013

== Season to season ==
Season	Level	Division	Section	Administration	Position	Movements	The Finnish Cup	Regions Cup
2011	Tier 7	Kutonen (Seventh Division)	Group 3	Tampere District (SPL Tampere)	3rd		2nd round	
2012	Tier 7	Kutonen (Seventh Division)	Group 4	Tampere District (SPL Tampere)	3rd		3rd round	2nd round
2013	Tier 7	Kutonen (Seventh Division)		Tampere District (SPL Tampere)			1st round	

- 3 season in Kutonen

== 2011 season ==
Vire are competing in the Kutonen administered by the Tampere SPL. This is the seventh highest tier in the Finnish football system.

== Boardroom ==
Role	Name
Chairman	(United States) Jussi Lehtinen
Chief Executive	(Finland) Antti Moilanen
Financial Advisor to the CEO	(Finland) Petri Saarinen
Foreign Marketing Supervisor	(Netherlands) Arno Noteboom
Football Operations Administrative Assistant/Senior Advisor	(Finland) Risto Lehtinen
Executive Director/Senior Advisor	(Finland) Kari Kanervisto
Honorary chairman	(Finland) Pauli Mustajärvi

== Field staff ==
Role	Name
Manager	(Finland) Petri Lamminpohja
Equipment Manager	(Finland) Kimmo Heinonen

== References and sources ==
- Official Ikurin Vire website
- Official Ikurin Vire Football Section website
- The Finnish Cup
- The Finnish Regions'Cup
