= Lillby =

Village in Ostrobothnia, Finland

- Village
- Location in Finland
- Coordinates: 63°28′41″N 23°00′40″E
- Country: Finland
- Region: Ostrobothnia
- Municipality: Pedersöre

Population (31 December 2020)
  - Total: 358
- Time zone: UTC+2 (EET)
  - Summer (DST): UTC+3 (EEST)
- Postal code: 68940

Lillby (lit. 'Little Village') is a village in the municipality of Pedersöre in Ostrobothnia, Finland. It was former administrative center of the former Purmo municipality. In 2020, it has over 300 inhabitants.

The village is located approximately 28 kilometres (17 mi) southeast of the town of Jakobstad along the regional road 741, which is narrow and winding, and there are no pedestrian or bicycle paths on the road; this makes the road dangerous, especially since approximately 1,300 vehicles pass through the village every day.

The village's services include Purmo School, which serves the entire Purmo area, and the K-Market Handelsboden grocery store.
