= Kronoby =

Kronoby Kronoby – Kruunupyy
- Municipality
- Kronoby kommun Kruunupyyn kunta
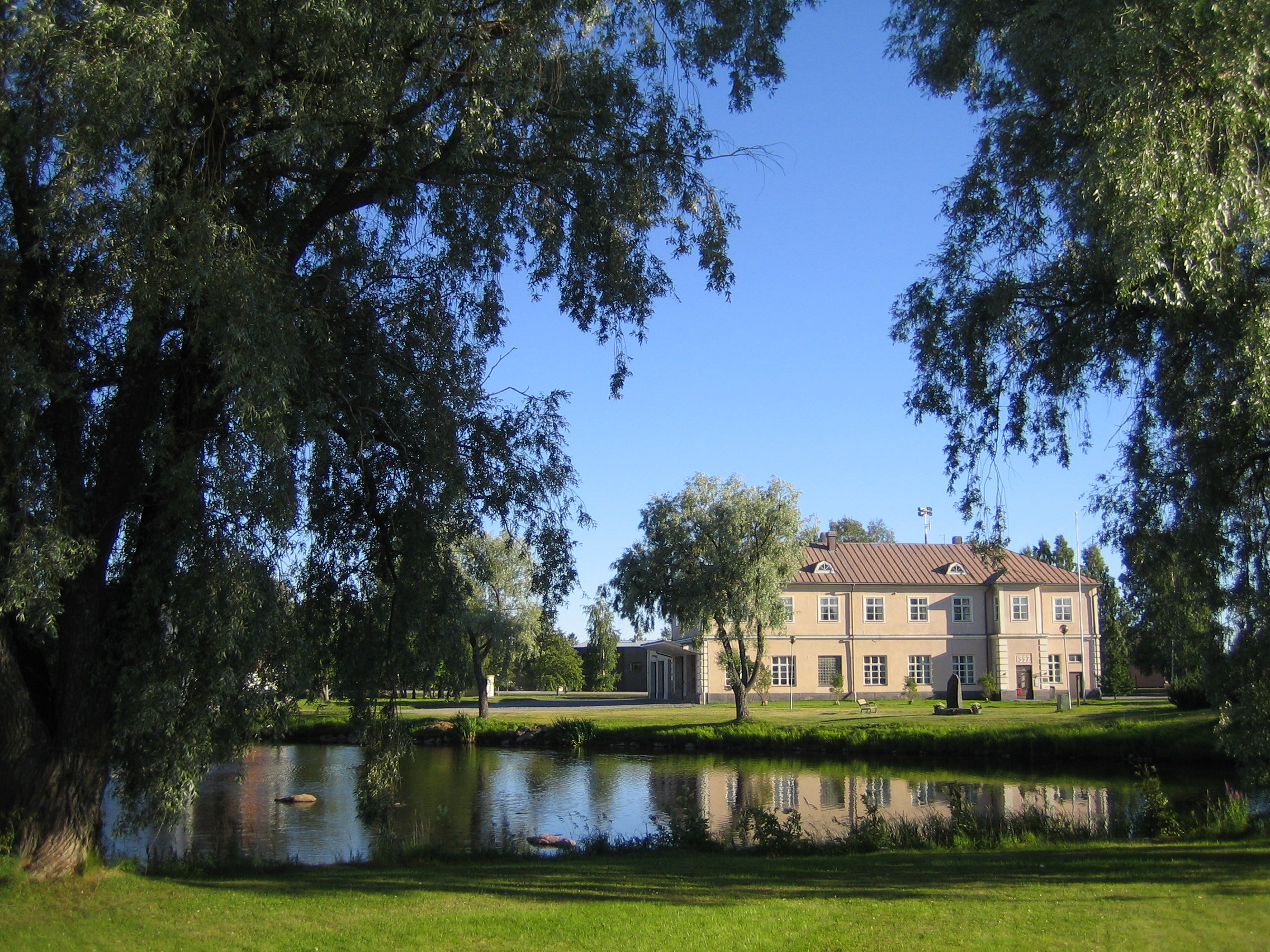
- Kronoby riverside

- Coat of arms

- Location of Kronoby in Finland
- Interactive map of Kronoby
- Coordinates: 63°43.5′N 023°02′E
- Country: Finland
- Region: Ostrobothnia
- Sub-region: Jakobstad
- Charter: 1607

Government
  - Municipal Manager: Michael Djupsjöbacka
  - Municipal Council Chairwoman: Marketta Widjeskog
  - Municipal Administration Chairman: Hans-Erik Lindgren

Area (2018-01-01)
  - Total: 752.65 km^{2} (290.60 sq mi)
  - Land: 712.85 km^{2} (275.23 sq mi)
  - Water: 40.3 km^{2} (15.6 sq mi)
  - Rank: 120th largest in Finland

Population (2025-12-31)
  - Total: 6,268
  - Rank: 147th largest in Finland
  - Density: 8.79/km^{2} (22.8/sq mi)

Population by native language
  - Swedish: 75.4% (official)
  - Finnish: 19.3% (official)
  - Others: 5.3%

Population by age
  - 0 to 14: 16.8%
  - 15 to 64: 57.1%
  - 65 or older: 26.1%
- Time zone: UTC+02:00 (EET)
  - Summer (DST): UTC+03:00 (EEST)
- Website: www.kronoby.fi

Kronoby (Finnish: Kruunupyy, Finnish: [ˈkruːnuˌpyː]) is a municipality in Finland, located on the west coast of the country. Kronoby is situated in Ostrobothnia, along the Gulf of Bothnia. The population of Kronoby is approximately 6,000, while the sub-region has a population of approximately 51,000. It is the 147th most populous municipality in Finland.

Kronoby covers an area of 752.65 square kilometres (290.60 sq mi) of which 40.3 km^{2} (15.6 sq mi) is water. The population density is 8.79 inhabitants per square kilometre (22.8/sq mi).

Kronoby is a bilingual municipality with Finnish and Swedish as its official languages. The population consists of 19% Finnish speakers, 75% Swedish speakers, and 5% speakers of other languages.

The neighbouring municipalities of Kronoby are Evijärvi, Kaustinen, Kokkola, Larsmo, Pedersöre and Veteli. The city of Vaasa is located 107 kilometres (66 mi) southwest of Kronoby.

Kokkola-Pietarsaari Airport is located in Kronoby.
