= Pedersöre =

Pedersöre Pedersöre – Pedersören kunta
- Municipality
- Pedersöre kommun Pedersören kunta
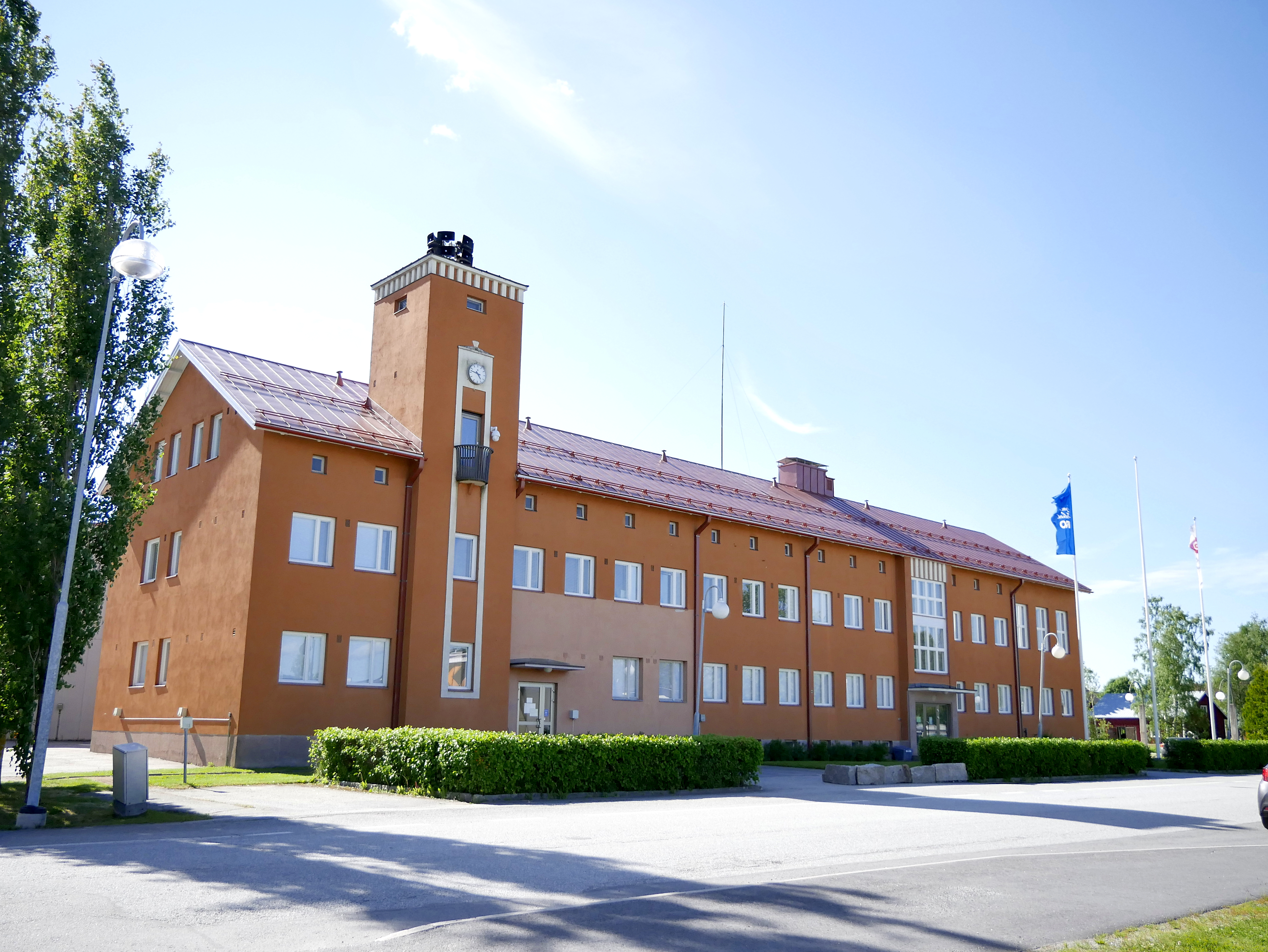
- Pedersöre municipal office

- Coat of arms

- Location of Pedersöre in Finland
- Interactive map of Pedersöre
- Coordinates: 63°36′N 022°47.5′E
- Country: Finland
- Region: Ostrobothnia
- Sub-region: Jakobstad
- Seat: Bennäs

Government
  - Municipal manager: Stefan Svenfors

Area (2018-01-01)
  - Total: 826.05 km^{2} (318.94 sq mi)
  - Land: 794.26 km^{2} (306.67 sq mi)
  - Water: 31.77 km^{2} (12.27 sq mi)
  - Rank: 103rd largest in Finland

Population (2025-12-31)
  - Total: 11,289
  - Rank: 87th largest in Finland
  - Density: 14.21/km^{2} (36.8/sq mi)

Population by native language
  - Swedish: 88.4% (official)
  - Finnish: 7.9% (official)
  - Others: 3.7%

Population by age
  - 0 to 14: 23.6%
  - 15 to 64: 58.1%
  - 65 or older: 18.4%
- Time zone: UTC+02:00 (EET)
  - Summer (DST): UTC+03:00 (EEST)
- Website: www.pedersore.fi

Pedersöre (Finnish: Pedersören kunta, before 1989 Pietarsaaren maalaiskunta) (Note: Literally "rural municipality of Jakobstad") is a municipality in Finland, located on the west coast of the country. Pedersöre is situated in Ostrobothnia, along the Gulf of Bothnia. The population of Pedersöre is approximately 11,000, while the sub-region has a population of approximately 51,000. It is the 87th most populous municipality in Finland.

Pedersöre covers an area of 826.05 square kilometres (318.94 sq mi) of which 31.77 km^{2} (12.27 sq mi) is water. The population density is 14.21 inhabitants per square kilometre (36.8/sq mi).

Pedersöre consists of many smaller villages, the most important being Bennäs, Kållby, Edsevö, Esse, Ytteresse and Purmo. The administrative centre is Bennäs. Neighbouring municipalities are Evijärvi, Kauhava, Kronoby, Larsmo, Jakobstad and Nykarleby.

Pedersöre is a bilingual municipality with Finnish and Swedish as its official languages. The population consists of 8% Finnish speakers, 88% Swedish speakers, and 4% speakers of other languages.

== History ==
Pedersöre was first mentioned in 1348 in a trade statute issued by king Magnus Eriksson. The municipalities Esse and Purmo separated from Pedersöre in 1865, only to return in 1977.

== Economy ==
Agriculture and shipbuilding have been the traditional industries in Pedersöre.
