= SPL Keski-Pohjanmaan piiri =

District organisation of the Football Association of Finland

Suomen Palloliiton Keski-Pohjanmaan piiri
- Abbreviation: SPL Keski-Pohjanmaa
- Formation: 1945
- Purpose: District Football Association
- Location(s): Kankurinkatu 6 A1 67100 Kokkola Finland
- Director: Kari Mars
- Website: splkeskipohjanmaa.fi

The SPL Keski-Pohjanmaan piiri (Central Ostrobothnia Football Association) was one of the 12 district organisations of the Football Association of Finland. It administered lower tier football in Central Ostrobothnia.

== Background ==
Suomen Palloliitto Keski-Pohjanmaan piiri, commonly referred to as SPL Keski-Pohjanmaan piiri or SPL Keski-Pohjanmaa, is the governing body for football in Central Ostrobothnia. The organisation was established on 25 November 1945 and had 57 different clubs with 350 teams and 475 registered players in 2010. Based in Kokkola, the Association's Director is Kari Mars.

== Member clubs ==
Abbreviation	Settlement	Official Name	Division	Cup	Other information
Esse IK	Esse, Pedersöre	Esse Idrottsklubb	Kolmonen	* *	
Esse IK II	Esse, Pedersöre	Esse Idrottsklubb / II	Vitonen	* *	
Esse IK III	Esse, Pedersöre	Esse Idrottsklubb / III	Kutonen	*	
FC Folk	Vatjusjärvi, Haapavesi	FC Folk	Vitonen	* *	
FC Stallions	Jakobstad	FC Stallions	Kutonen	*	
FC YPA	Ylivieska	Jalkapalloseura FC YPA	Kakkonen	* * *	
FC YPA II	Ylivieska	Jalkapalloseura FC YPA / II	Nelonen	* *	
FC YPA III	Ylivieska	Jalkapalloseura FC YPAA / III	Vitonen	*	
FF Jaro	Jakobstad	Fotbollsföreningen Jaro	Veikkausliiga	* * *	
FF Kickers	Bennäs	Fotbollsföreningen Kickers	Kutonen	* *	
FoBK	Forsby, Pedersöre	Forsby Bollklubb	Kutonen	* *	
Friska Viljor	Kokkola	Friska Viljor	Kutonen	*	
GBK	Kokkola	Gamlakarleby Bollklubb	Kakkonen	* * *	
GBK II	Kokkola	Gamlakarleby Bollklubb / II	Kolmonen	* *	
GBK III	Kokkola	Gamlakarleby Bollklubb / III	Kutonen	*	
HBK	Kronoby	Hovsala Bollklubb	Nelonen	*	
HBK II	Kronoby	Hovsala Bollklubb / II	Kutonen	*	
HK	Haapajärvi	Haapajärven Kiilat	Kutonen	*	
IFK Jakobstad	Jakobstad	Idrottsföreningen Kamraterna Jakobstad	Kolmonen	* *	
IFK Jakobstad II	Jakobstad	Idrottsföreningen Kamraterna Jakobstad / II	Kutonen	*	
IFS	Lillby, Pedersöre	Idrottsföreningen Standard	Kutonen	*	
IK Myran	Nedervetil, Kronoby	Idrottsklubben Myran	Nelonen	* *	
IK Myran II	Nedervetil, Kronoby	Idrottsklubben Myran / II	Vitonen	*	
JBK	Jakobstad	Jakobstads Bollklubb	Kolmonen	* * *	
KP-87	Kokkola	Kokkolan Pallo -87	Kutonen	*	
K-Pallo	Kalajoki	Kalajoen Pallo	Nelonen	*	
KPV	Kokkola	Kokkolan Palloveikot	Kakkonen	* * *	
KP-V	Kaustinen	Kaustisen Pohjan-Veikot	Vitonen	* *	
KPV II	Kokkola	Kokkolan Palloveikot / II	Kutonen	*	
KP-V II	Kaustinen	Kaustisen Pohjan-Veikot / II	Kutonen	*	
KUF	Kållby, Pedersöre	Kållby Ungdomsförening	Kutonen	*	
LBK	Larsmo	Larsmo Bollklubb	Nelonen	*	
LoVe	Lohtaja, Kokkola	Lohtajan Veikot	Nelonen	*	
MunU	Munsala, Nykarleby	Munsala United	Vitonen	* *	
NIK	Nykarleby	Nykarleby Idrottsklubb	Nelonen	* *	
No Stars	Kokkola	No Stars	Nelonen	*	
Oldboys	Jakobstad	Fotbollsföreningen Oldboys	Kutonen	*	
OuHu	Oulainen	Oulaisten Huima	Vitonen	* *	
PeFF	Forsby, Pedersöre	Pedersöre Fotbollsförening	Nelonen	*	
PeFF II	Forsby, Pedersöre	Pedersöre Fotbollsförening / II	Kutonen	*	
Prs Into	Jakobstad	Pietarsaaren Into	Vitonen	*	
PUF	Pensala, Nykarleby	Pensala Ungdomsförening	Kutonen	*	
Reima	Kokkola	Ykspihlajan Reima	Kolmonen	* *	
Reima II	Kokkola	Ykspihlajan Reima / II	Vitonen	*	
RyPK-84	Kokkola	Rytimäen Pallokerho -84	Vitonen	*	
Såka	Kokkola	Såka Fotboll	Vitonen	*	
Sääripotku	Kokkola	FC Sääripotku	Vitonen	* *	
Tarmo	Kälviä, Kokkola	Kälviän Tarmo	Kutonen	*	
Team NIK	Nykarleby	Nykarleby Idrottsklubb	Vitonen	*	
TUS	Terjärv, Kronoby	Terjärv Ungdoms Sportklubb	Nelonen	* *	
TUS II	Terjärv, Kronoby	Terjärv Ungdoms Sportklubb / II	Vitonen	*	
Ura	Kannus	Kannuksen Ura	Kutonen	*	
VetU	Veteli	Vetelin Urheilijat	Kutonen	*	
Väsymättömät	Kaustinen	Team Väsymättömät	Kutonen	*	
Öja-73	Öja, Kokkola	Bollklubben Öja-73	Kutonen	* *	

== League Competitions ==
SPL Keski-Pohjanmaan piiri run the following league competitions:

=== Men's Football ===
- Division 3 – Kolmonen – one section
- Division 4 – Nelonen – one section
- Division 5 – Vitonen – one section
- Division 6 – Kutonen – two sections

=== Ladies Football ===
- Division 3 – Kolmonen – one section
