= SPL Kaakkois-Suomen piiri =

District organisation of the Football Association of Finland

Suomen Palloliiton Kaakkois-Suomen piiri
- Abbreviation: SPL Kaakkois-Suomi
- Formation: 1994
- Purpose: District Football Association
- Location(s): Kimpisenkatu 17 B 29 53100 Lappeenranta Finland
- Director: Veijo Vainikka
- Website: kaakkois-suomi.palloliitto.fi

The SPL Kaakkois-Suomen piiri (South Eastern Finland Football Association) was one of the 12 district organizations of the Football Association of Finland. It administered lower-tier football in South Eastern Finland.

== Background ==
Suomen Palloliitto Kaakkois-Suomen piiri, commonly referred to as SPL Kaakkois-Suomen piiri or SPL Kaakkois-Suomi, is the governing body for football in South Eastern Finland. The organisation was established on 24 November 1994 and had 84 different clubs with 370 teams and 8,433 registered players in February 2010. Based in Lappeenranta, the Association's Director is Veijo Vainikka.

== Member clubs ==
Abbreviation	Settlement	Official name	Division	Cup	Other information
Atomit	Loviisa	Atomit Loviisa	Vitonen	*	
FC Etapo	Kotka	FC Etapo	Kutonen	*	
FC Kausala	Kouvola	FC Kausala	Vitonen	*	
FC KooTeePee	Kotka	FC KooTeePee	Ykkönen	* * *	Recent history: KTP Kotka 1 until 2000; KooTeePee Kotka since 2001; Tier 1 (31 seasons): 1948–58, 1963–69, 1979–83, 1999–2000, 2003–08; Tier 2 (19 seasons): 1943/44, 1959–62, 1970–72, 1978, 1984, 1994–98, 2002, 2009–; Tier 3 (15 seasons): 1973–77, 1985–93, 2001
FC Kuusankoski	Kuusankoski, Kouvola	FC Kuusankoski	Kakkonen	* * *	Recent history: PaPe Kuusankoski until 1996; FC Kuusankoski since 1997 (merger with Kumu Kuusankoski); Tier 2 (9 seasons): 1965, 1969–72, 2001–04; Tier 3 (15 seasons): 1973–75, 1995–2000, 2005–10
FC Mikkeli	Mikkeli	FC Mikkeli	No record	*	See MP Mikkeli
FC PaSa	Imatra	Imatran Pallo-Salamat	Nelonen	* *	Tier 2 (2 seasons): 1967, 1972; Tier 3 (3 seasons): 1993–94, 1998
FC Peltirumpu	Kouvola	FC Peltirumpu	Nelonen	* *	
FC Pesä	Imatra	FC Pesä	Kutonen	*	
FC PotkuPallo	Lappeenranta	FC PotkuPallo	Vitonen	*	
FC SuSi	Kotka	FC Sunilan Sisu	Kutonen	* *	
FC Villisiat	Elimäki, Kouvola	FC Villisiat	Nelonen	* *	
HaPK	Hamina	Haminan Pallo-Kissat	Nelonen	* *	
HaTP	Hamina	Haminan Työväen Palloilijat	Kutonen	* *	
HiHi	Sippola, Kouvola	Hirvelän Hirvet	Kutonen	*	
HP-47	Heinola	Heinolan Palloilijat-47	Kolmonen	* *	
IPS	Imatra	Imatran Palloseura	Kolmonen	* *	
JaVo	Jaala, Kouvola	Jaalan Voima	Kutonen	*	
JK Bulls	Imatra	JK Bulls Imatra	Vitonen	*	
Jäntevä	Kotka	Kotkan Jäntevä	Kolmonen	*	
Jäntevä Ukot	Kotka	Jäntevä Ukot	Vitonen	*	
Kajastus	Kaipiainen, Kouvola	Kaipiaisten Kajastus	Kutonen	*	
Karpo	Kotka	Karhulan Pojat	Kutonen	* *	
Kiri	Kotka	Kotkan Kiri	Vitonen	* *	
KoPa	Lemi	Kotajärven Pallo	Nelonen	* *	
KoRe	Kotka	Kotkan Reipas	Kolmonen	* *	
KPonsi	Kouvola	Korian Ponsi	Vitonen	* *	
KTP	Kotka	Kotkan Työväen Palloilijat	Kakkonen	* * *	KTP Kotka 1: see KooTeePee Kotka; KTP Kotka 2 Tier 3 (3 seasons): 2008–09, 2011
Kultsu FC	Lappeenranta	Kultsu FC (Joutsenon Kullervo)	Kolmonen	* *	
Kultsu FC/2	Lappeenranta	Kultsu FC / 2	Kutonen	* *	
KuP	Punkaharju, Savonlinna	Kulennoisten Pallo	Nelonen	*	
LaPe	Lappeenranta	LAUTP (Lauritsalan Työväen Palloilijat) / Lappeen Pelurit	Vitonen	*	
Lappee JK	Lappeenranta	Lappeen Jalkapalloklubi	Nelonen	*	
LIK	Liljendal, Loviisa	Liljendal Idrottsklubb	Vitonen	*	
LiRy	Lappeenranta	Lappeenrannan Itäinen Raittiusyhdistys	Kutonen	*	
LuPo	Taavetti, Luumäki	Luumäen Pojat	Kutonen	*	
MiKi	Mikkeli	Mikkelin Kissat	Kolmonen	*	Previous names: MiPK Mikkeli until 1983; MiKi Mikkeli from 1984 to 1998 and since 2002; MiPa Mikkeli from 1999 to 2001; see also FC Mikkeli; Tier 1 (11 seasons): 1962–64, 1971, 1974–79, 1981; Tier 2 (13 seasons): 1959–61, 1965–70, 1972–73, 1980, 1982; Tier 3 (14 seasons): 1983, 1987–88, 1994–2000, 2002, 2004–05, 2007
MiPa	Mikkeli	Mikkelin Pallo	No record	*	See MiKi Mikkeli
MiPK	Mikkeli	Mikkelin Pallo-Kissat	No record	*	See MiKi Mikkeli
MoNsa	Lappeenranta	Montolan Nuorisoseura	Vitonen	*	
MP	Mikkeli	Mikkelin Palloilijat	Ykkönen	* * *	Previous names: MP Mikkeli until 1998 and since 2002; FC Mikkeli from 1999 to 2001 (merger with MiKi Mikkeli); Tier 1 (25 seasons): 1966–77, 1981, 1984, 1986–96; Tier 2 (22 seasons): 1939, 1960–65, 1978–80, 1982–83, 1985, 1997–2001, 2004–06, 2010; Tier 3 (6 seasons): 2002–03, 2007–09, 2011
MyPa-47	Myllykoski, Kouvola	Myllykosken Pallo –47	Veikkausliiga	* * *	Tier 1 (21 seasons): 1975, 1992– Tier 2 (18 seasons): 1970–74, 1976–81, 1985–91; Tier 3 (3 seasons): 1982–84
MyPa-86	Myllykoski, Kouvola	Myllykosken Pallo-86	No record	*	Tier 3 (2 seasons): 1992–93
MYPASSION FC	Myllykoski, Kouvola	MYPASSION FC	Kutonen	*	
MäJä	Mäntyharju	Mäntyharjun Jäntevä	Kutonen	* *	
NaKa	Lappeenranta	Jalkapalloseura NaKa (Namut Kassit)	Vitonen	* *	
OViesti	Otava, Mikkeli	Otavan Viesti	Vitonen	*	
PaPe	Voikkaa, Kouvola	Pallo-Peikot	Kolmonen	* *	
PeKa	Kotka	Peli-Karhut	Vitonen	*	
PeKa/2	Kotka	Peli-Karhut / 2	Kutonen	*	
PEPO	Lappeenranta	PEPO Lappeenranta	Kakkonen	* * *	
PePo	Pertunmaa	Pertunmaan Ponnistajat	Kutonen	*	
PoPo	Kotka	Popinniemen Ponnistus	Vitonen	* *	
Purha	Inkeroinen, Kouvola	Inkeroisten Purha	Vitonen	* *	
RiPa	Ristiina	Ristiinan Pallo	Vitonen	* *	
RiPa/2	Ristiina	Ristiinan Pallo / 2	Kutonen	*	
RPS Lions	Ruokolahti	Ruokolahden Palloseura / Lions	Kutonen	*	
SavU	Mikkeli	Savilahden Urheilijat	Kolmonen	* *	
SiU	Simpele, Rautjärvi	Simpeleen Urheilijat	Nelonen	* *	
SiU/2 PaSa/2	Simpele, Rautjärvi / Imatra	Simpeleen Urheilijat 2 / Imatran Pallo-Salamat 2	Vitonen	*	
SKT-Futis	Summa, Hamina	Summan Kisa-toverit Futis	Kutonen	*	
STPS	Savonlinna	Savonlinnan Työväen Palloseura	Kolmonen	* *	
STPS/2	Savonlinna	Savonlinnan Työväen Palloseura / 2	Nelonen	*	
StU	Savitaipale	Savitaipaleen Urheilijat	Kutonen	*	
Sudet	Kouvola	Sudet	Kolmonen	* *	
Sudet/2	Kouvola	Sudet / 2	Kutonen	*	
Sudet Pure Amis	Kouvola	Sudet / Pure Amis	Kutonen	*	
TsV	Taipalsaari	Taipalsaaren Veikot	Nelonen	*	
ViSa	Virolahti	Vesilahden Visa	Vitonen	*	
VKajo	Valkeala, Kouvola	Valkealan Kajo	Vitonen	* *	
VoPpK	Voikkaa, Kouvola	Voikkaan Potkupallo Kerho	Kutonen	* *	

== League Competitions ==
SPL Kaakkois-Suomen piiri run the following league competitions:

=== Men's Football ===
- Division 3 – Kolmonen – one section
- Division 4 – Nelonen – one section
- Division 5 – Vitonen – two sections
- Division 6 – Kutonen – three sections

=== Ladies Football ===
- Division 3 – Kolmonen – one section
