= SPL Tampereen piiri =

District organisation of the Football Association of Finland

Suomen Palloliiton Tampereen piiri
- Abbreviation: SPL Tampere
- Purpose: District Football Association
- Location(s): Tampellan esplanadi 6 33100 Tampere Finland
- Director: Jarmo Tuomiranta
- Website: tampere.palloliitto.fi

The SPL Tamperen piiri (Tampere Football Association) was one of the 12 district organisations of the Football Association of Finland. It administered lower tier football in Tampere.

== Background ==
Suomen Palloliitto Tampereen piiri, commonly referred to as SPL Tamperen piiri or SPL Tampere, is the governing body for football in Tampere. Based in the city of Tampere, the Association's Director is Timo Korsumäki.

== Member clubs ==
Abbreviation	Settlement	Official Name	Division	Cup	Other information
AC Darra	Tampere	Athletic Club Darra Tampere	Kutonen	*	
AC Goljat	Tampere	AC Goljat	Kutonen	*	
AC Juice	Tampere	AC Juice	Kutonen	*	
ACE	Tampere	Tampereen Teekkareiden JP-kerho ACE	Vitonen	*	
Apassit	Kyröskoski, Hämeenkyrö	Parkunmäen Apassit	Vitonen	* *	
Apassit /2	Kyröskoski, Hämeenkyrö	Parkunmäen Apassit / 2	Kutonen	*	
AS-Team	Tampere	AS-Team	Kutonen	*	
City	Tampere	Norsulauma FC	Kutonen	*	
Dynamo UTD	Tampere	Dynamo UTD	Kutonen	*	
FC Futarit	Tampere	Tampereen FC Futarit	Kutonen	* *	
FC Haka	Valkeakoski	FC Haka	Veikkausliiga	* * *	
FC Hämeenlinna	Hämeenlinna	FC Hämeenlinna	Ykkönen	* * *	
FC LaKu	Tampere	Lahnavetten Kuninkaat	Kutonen	*	
FC Loppi	Loppi	FC Loppi	Kutonen	*	
FC Melody	Tampere	FC Melody	Vitonen	*	
FC Polla /1	Tampere	Pallopäät (FC Polla) / 1	Kutonen	*	
FC Polla /2	Tampere	Pallopäät (FC Polla) / 2	Vitonen	*	
FC Potku	Tampere	FC Tampereen Potku	Kutonen	*	
FC Rellu	Tampere	FC Rellu	Kutonen	*	
FC Tampere	Tampere	FC Tampere FCT	Nelonen	* *	
FC Teivo	Ylöjärvi	FC Teivo	Vitonen	* *	
FC Tigers	Tampere	FC Tampere / FC Tigers	Kolmonen	*	
FC Tribe	Nokia	FC Tribe	Kutonen	* *	
FC Trompi	Tampere	FC Trompi	Kutonen	* *	
FC Vapsi	Vammala	FC Vapsi	Vitonen	* *	
FC ViP	Virrat	FC Pallokarhut Virrat	Kutonen	*	
FC Voltti	Karkku, Sastamala	FC Voltti-96	Kutonen	*	
FJK	Forssa	Forssan Jalkapalloklubi	Nelonen	* *	
HirPy	Hirsilä, Orivesi	Hirsilän Pyrkivä	Kutonen	*	
HST	Tampere	Hervanta Sporting Team	Vitonen	* *	
Härmä	Hämeenlinna	Hämeenlinnan Härmä	Kolmonen	* *	
I-Kissat	Tampere	Ilves-Kissat Tampere	Kolmonen	* *	
IkU	Ikaalinen	Ikaalisten Urheilijat	Kutonen	*	
Ikurin Vire	Tampere	Ikurin Vire	Kutonen	* *	
Ilves	Tampere	Ilves	Kakkonen	* * *	
IPa	Iittala, Hämeenlinna	Iittalan Pallo	Kutonen	*	
Jags	Hämeenlinna	Jukola Jaguars	Vitonen	*	
Jags 2	Hämeenlinna	Jukola Jaguars / 2	Kutonen	*	
KaVo	Kangasala	Kangasalan Voitto	Nelonen	* *	
Koskenpojat	Valkeakoski	Football Club Haka / Koskenpojat	Kolmonen	*	Previously known as Valkeakosken Koskenpojat (VaKP).
Kristallipalatsi	Nokia	Kuninkaallinen Kristallipalatsi 2000	Vitonen	* *	
KylVe	Kylmäkoski, Akaa	Kylmäkosken Veikot	Vitonen	*	
LaPro	Tampere	Lamminpään Pallopeli Projekti	Vitonen	*	
LaVe	Lammi, Hämeenlinna	Lammin Veto	Nelonen	* *	
LeKi-futis	Lempäälä	LeKi-futis Lempäälän Palloseura	Vitonen	* *	
LeTo AC	Lempäälä	Lempäälän Toivot / AC	Kutonen	*	
Loiske	Sääksjärvi, Lempäälä	Sääksjärven Loiske	Nelonen	* *	Also known as Loiske Toivot.
MesTo	Tampere	Messukylän Toverit	No record	*	Tier 2 (1 season): 1963
MouMa	Mouhijärvi, Sastamala	Mouhijärven V- ja U-seura Malli	Kutonen	*	
NePa	Tampere	Nekalan Pallo	Kolmonen	* *	
NoPS	Nokia	Nokian Palloseura	Kolmonen	* *	
NoPS /2	Nokia	Nokian Palloseura / 2	Kutonen	*	
NoPy	Nokia	Nokian Pyry	Vitonen	* *	
OldSchool	Tampere	AC OldSchool CF	Vitonen	* *	
ParVi	Parola, Hattula	Parolan Visa	Vitonen	* *	
ParVi KäPy	Parola, Hattula	Parolan Visa / KäPy	Kutonen	*	
PATO	Tervakoski, Janakkala	Tervakosken Pato	Kolmonen	* *	
PATO /2	Tervakoski, Janakkala	Tervakosken Pato / 2	Kutonen	*	
PiPo-79	Tampere	Pispalan Ponnistus -79	Vitonen	* *	
PIsku	Hattula	Pekolan Isku	Vitonen	*	
PJK	Pirkkala	Pirkkalan Jalkapalloklubi	Kolmonen	* *	
PJK /2	Pirkkala	Pirkkalan Jalkapalloklubi / 2	Vitonen	* *	
PJK /3	Pirkkala	Pirkkalan Jalkapalloklubi / 3	Kutonen	*	
PONU BK	Nokia	Pohjois Nokian Urheilijat Bollklubben	Kutonen	*	
PP-70	Tampere	Tampereen Peli-Pojat-70	Nelonen	* *	
PP-70 /2	Tampere	Tampereen Peli-Pojat-70 / 2	Vitonen	* *	
PS-44	Valkeakoski	Pallo-Sepot -44	Kolmonen	*	
Soho SS	Tampere	Soho Sporting Society	Vitonen	*	
Sopu	Sääksmäki, Valkeakoski	Sääksmäen Sopu	Vitonen	*	
SW	Sastamala	Sastamalan Voima	Kutonen	* *	
TaPa	Tampere	Tampereen Palloilijat	Vitonen	*	
TaPa 2	Tampere	Tampereen Palloilijat / 2	Kutonen	*	
TJK LiePo	Tampere	Tampereen Jalkapalloklubi / LiePo	Vitonen	*	
TKT	Tampere	Tampereen Kisatoverit	Kolmonen	* *	
TKT KooTee	Tampere	Tampereen Kisatoverit / KooTee	Vitonen	*	
TP-49	Toijala, Akaa	Toijalan Pallo-49	Nelonen	* *	Also abbreviated as ToiP -49.
TP-T	Tampere	Tampereen Peli-Toverit	Kolmonen	* *	
TPV	Tampere	Tampereen Palloveikot	Ykkönen	* * *	
TPV 2	Tampere	Tampereen Pallo-Veikot / 2	Kolmonen	* *	
Tuisku Daltonit	Orivesi	Oriveden Tuisku / Daltonit	Vitonen	*	
UrPS	Urjala	Urjalan Palloseura	Vitonen	* *	
VaKP	Valkeakoski	Valkeakosken Koskenpojat	Vitonen	* *	
Valo	Mänttä, Mänttä-Vilppula	Mäntän Valo	Vitonen	*	
VehU	Tampere	Vehmaisten Urheilijat	Kutonen	*	
VesVi	Vesilahti	Vesilahden Visa	Kutonen	*	
ViiPV	Viiala, Akaa	Viialan Peli-Veikot	Vitonen	* *	
VilTe	Viljakkala, Ylöjärvi	Viljakkalan Teräs	Kutonen	*	
VJ09	Tampere	Vierasjoukkue	Kutonen		
YlöR	Ylöjärvi	Ylöjärven Ryhti	Vitonen	* *	
YlöR /2	Ylöjärvi	Ylöjärven Ryhti / 2	Kutonen	*	
YPA	Ylöjärvi	Ylöjärven Pallo	Vitonen	* *	Also abbreviated as YPallo.

== League Competitions ==
SPL Tamperen piiri run the following league competitions:

=== Men's Football ===
- Division 3 - Kolmonen - one section
- Division 4 - Nelonen - one section
- Division 5 - Vitonen - two sections
- Division 6 - Kutonen - five sections

=== Ladies Football ===
- Division 3 - Kolmonen - one section
