= SPL Itä-Suomen piiri =

Organization of the Football Association of Finland

Suomen Palloliiton Itä-Suomen piiri
- Abbreviation: SPL Itä-Suomi
- Formation: 1994
- Purpose: District Football Association
- Headquarters: Magnum Areena; Kaartokatu 6
- Location(s): PL 179 70101 Kuopio Finland
- Director: Pekka Ojala
- Website: ita-suomi.palloliitto.fi

The SPL Itä-Suomen piiri (Eastern Finland Football Association) was one of the 12 district organisations of the Football Association of Finland. It administered lower tier football in Eastern Finland.

== Background ==
Suomen Palloliitto Itä-Suomen piiri, commonly referred to as SPL Itä-Suomen piiri or SPL Itä-Suomi, is the governing body for football in Eastern Finland. Based in Kuopio, the Association's Director is Pekka Ojala. The organisation was established in 1994 following the amalgamation of SPL Joensuun piiri and SPL Savon piiri.

== Member clubs ==
Abbreviation	Settlement	Official name	Division	Cup	Other information
AC BARCA	Vartiala, Kuopio	AC BARCA	Vitonen	*	
AFC Keltik	Joensuu	Amateur Football Club Keltik	Kolmonen	* *	
AFC Keltik/2	Joensuu	Amateur Football Club Keltik/2	Vitonen	* *	
AS KaWe	Kuopio	AS KallaWesj	Vitonen	*	
FC Nurmes	Nurmes	FC Nurmes	Vitonen	*	
FC Tarzan	Kuopio	FC Tarzan	Vitonen	*	
Hurtat	Lieksa	Juniori-Hurtat	Vitonen	* *	
JIPPO	Joensuu	JIPPO	Ykkösliiga	* * *	
JIPPO-j PunaMusta	Joensuu	JIPPO-j Punamusta	Nelonen	* *	
JoPS	Joensuu	Joensuun Palloseura	Vitonen	* *	
JuPS	Juuka	Juuan Palloseura	Vitonen	* *	
JuPy	Juankoski, Kuopio	Juankosken Pyrkivä	Vitonen	*	
KJK	Kuopio	Kuopion Jalkapallokerho	Nelonen	*	
KuKi	Kurkimäki, Kuopio	Kurkimäen Kisa	Nelonen	*	
KuPS	Kuopio	Kuopion Palloseura	Veikkausliiga	* * *	
LaPa-95	Lapinlahti	Lapinlahden Pallo-95	Vitonen	*	
LehPa	Lehmo, Kontiolahti	Lehmon Pallo-77	Kolmonen	* *	
LehPa/2	Lehmo, Kontiolahti	Lehmon Pallo-77 / 2	Nelonen	*	
NP-H	Nilsiä, Kuopio	Nilsiän Pallo-Haukat	Vitonen	*	
OuPa	Outokumpu	Outokummun Pallo	Nelonen	*	
PAVE	Iisalmi	PAVE	Nelonen	*	
PK-37	Iisalmi	Pallo-Kerho 37	Kolmonen	* * *	
PK-37/2	Iisalmi	Pallo-Kerho 37 / 2	Vitonen	*	
PoPS-78	Polvijärvi	Polvijärven Palloseura-78	Vitonen	*	
Raiku	Rautavaara	Rautavaaran Raiku	Vitonen	*	
Riverball	Joensuu	Riverball	Vitonen	*	
SaPa	Pieksämäki	Savon Pallo	Nelonen	*	
SaPa/2	Pieksämäki	Savon Pallo/2	Vitonen	*	
SC Riverball	Joensuu	Soccer Club Riverball	Vitonen	* * *	
SC Zulimanit	Kuopio	Soccer Club Zulimanit	Kolmonen	* *	
SiPS	Siilinjärvi	Siilinjärven Palloseura	Vitonen	*	
ToU	Toivala, Siilinjärvi	Toivalan Urheilijat	Nelonen	* *	
Warkaus JK	Varkaus	Warkauden Jalkapalloklubi	Kakkonen	* * *	
Yllätys	Ylämylly, Liperi	Ylämyllyn Yllätys	Kolmonen	* *	
Zulimanit	Kuopio	Soccer Club Zulimanit	Kolmonen	* *	*

== League Competitions ==
SPL Itä-Suomen piiri run the following league competitions:

=== Men's Football ===
- Division 3 - Kolmonen - one section
- Division 4 - Nelonen - two sections
- Division 5 - Vitonen - three sections

=== Ladies Football ===
- Division 3 - Kolmonen - one section
- Small-sided - Pienkenttä - one section
