= SPL Turun piiri =

District organisation of the Football Association of Finland

Suomen Palloliiton Turun piiri
- Abbreviation: SPL Turku
- Purpose: District Football Association
- Location(s): Yliopistonkatu 31 20100 Turku Finland
- Director: Jouni Koivuniemi
- Website: turku.palloliitto.fi

The SPL Turun piiri (Turku Football Association) was one of the 12 district organisations of the Football Association of Finland. It administered lower tier football in Turku.

== Background ==
Suomen Palloliiton Turun piiri, commonly referred to as SPL Turun piiri or SPL Turku, is the governing body for football in Turku. Based in the city of Turku, the association's director is Jouni Koivuniemi.

== Member clubs ==
| Abbreviation | Settlement | Official name | Division | Cup | Other information |
|---|---|---|---|---|---|
| AC Sauvo | Sauvo | Sauvon Urheilijat / AC Sauvo | Vitonen | * | |
| AFC Campus | Turku | Academic Football Club Campus | Vitonen | * | |
| Atletico | Turku | Atletico Ispoinen | Vitonen | * | |
| AU | Alastaro, Loimaa | Alastaron Urheilijat | Kutonen | * | |
| BFB | Piikkiö, Kaarina | BFB Piikkiö | Vitonen | * | |
| CELT'S | Turku | Castle Celtics | Kutonen | * | |
| FC Boda | Björkboda, Kimitoön | FC Boda | Kolmonen | * * | |
| FC Bosna | Turku | Suomi-Bosnia seura | Vitonen | * * | |
| FC Dynamo | Turku | FC Dynamo | Kutonen | * | |
| FC Halikko | Halikko, Salo | FC Halikko | Kutonen | * | |
| FC Inter | Turku | FC Inter Turku | Veikkausliiga | * * * | |
| FC Inter 2 | Turku | FC Inter Turku / 2 | Nelonen | * | |
| FC Kaarina | Kaarina | FC Kaarina | Kutonen | * | |
| FC Koivu | Turku | FC Koivu | Kutonen | * | |
| FC Komar | Turku | FC Komar Kurdistan | Kutonen | * | |
| FC KyPS | Kyrö, Pöytyä | FC Kyrön Palloseura | Kutonen | * * | |
| FC NU | Turku | FC Nations United | Vitonen | * | |
| FC Persia | Turku | Turun Iranilaisten kulttuuriseura | Kutonen | * | |
| FC RP | Rusko | Ruskon Pallo | Vitonen | * | |
| FC Turku | Turku | Football Club Turku -82 | Vitonen | * * | |
| FC Tykit | Turku | FC Navaronen Tykit | Kutonen | * | |
| FunctioL | Turku | Functio Laesa | Kutonen | * | |
| Heitto | Turku | Hirvensalon Heitto | Kutonen | * | |
| Hot Lips | Turku | FC HotLips Turku | Vitonen | * | |
| Jyske | Laitila | Laitilan Jyske | Vitonen | * | |
| JyTy | Turku | Jyrkkälän Tykit | Kolmonen | * * | |
| KaaPo | Kaarina | Kaarinan Pojat | Kolmonen | * * * | |
| KaaPS | Kaarina | Kaarinan Palloseura | Vitonen | * * | |
| KaaRe | Kaarina | Kaarinan Reipas | Vitonen | * * | |
| KaaRe 2 | Kaarina | Kaarinan Reipas / 2 | Kutonen | * | |
| KiKi | Kisko, Salo | Kiskon Kiskojat | Kutonen | * | |
| KuuLa | Turku | Kuuvuoren Laaki | Kutonen | * | |
| Lieto | Lieto | Liedon Pallo | Nelonen | * * | |
| Lieto 2 | Lieto | Liedon Pallo / 2 | Vitonen | * * | |
| Lieto 3 | Lieto | Liedon Pallo / 3 | Kutonen | * | |
| LoPS | Loimaa | Loimaan Palloseura | Kutonen | * * | |
| LTU | Littoinen, Kaarina | Littoisten Työväen Urheilijat | Kolmonen | * * | |
| LTU 2 | Littoinen, Kaarina | Littoisten Työväen Urheilijat / 2 | Vitonen | * | |
| LTU 3 | Littoinen, Kaarina | Littoisten Työväen Urheilijat / 3 | Kutonen | * | |
| MaPS | Masku | Maskun Palloseura | Kakkonen | * | Tier 3 (6 seasons): 1999, 2003-07 |
| MaPS 2 | Masku | Maskun Palloseura / 2 | Nelonen | * | |
| MKV | Turku | Maarian Kisa-Veikot | No record | * | See TuKV Turku |
| MynPa | Mynämäki | Mynämäen Pallo-53 | Nelonen | * * | |
| MynPa 2 | Mynämäki | Mynämäen Pallo-53 / 2 | Kutonen | * | |
| Nagu IF | Nagu, Pargas | Nagu Idrottsförening RF | Vitonen | * * | |
| OU | Oripää | Oripään Urheilijat | Kutonen | * | |
| PaiHa | Paimio | Paimion Haka | Vitonen | * * | |
| Pamaus | Paattinen, Turku | Paattisten Pamaus | Kutonen | * | |
| PaVin | Turku | Pansion Vintiöt | Vitonen | * | |
| PIF | Pargas | Pargas Idrottsförening | Kolmonen | * * | |
| PiPS | Piikkiö, Kaarina | Piikkiön Palloseura | Vitonen | * * | |
| Ponteva | Turku | Turun Ponteva | Vitonen | * | |
| Rai-Fu | Raisio | Raisio-Futis | Kutonen | * | |
| RaiTeePee | Raisio | Raision Työväen Palloilijat | Vitonen | * * | |
| Ryhti | Raisio | Raision Ryhti | Vitonen | * | |
| SalPa | Salo | Salon Palloilijat | Kakkonen | * * * | |
| SaPeLi | Salo | Salon Peli ja Liikunta | Kutonen | * | |
| SaTo | Salo | Salon Toverit | Nelonen | * * | |
| SC Hornets | Raisio | Soccer Club Hornets | Kutonen | * | |
| SC Stix | Turku | SC Stix | Kutonen | * | |
| SCR | Raisio | Sporting Club Raisio | Vitonen | * | |
| Sinimustat | Turku | FC Sinimustat | No Record | * * | |
| SoVo | Somero | Someron Voima | Kolmonen | * * * | |
| SoVo 2 | Somero | Someron Voima / 2 | Kutonen | * | |
| TaaJä | Dalsbruk (Taalintehdas), Kimitoön | Taalintehtaan Jäntevä | Vitonen | * * | |
| Torre Calcio | Turku | Torre Calcio | Kutonen | * | |
| TPK | Turku | Turun Pallokerho | Kolmonen | * * | |
| TPK 2 | Turku | Turun Pallokerho / 2 | Nelonen | * * | |
| TPS | Turku | Turun Palloseura | Veikkausliiga | * * * | |
| TuHa | Turku | Turun Haka | Kutonen | * | |
| TuKV | Turku | Turun Kisa-Veikot | Vitonen | * | |
| TuPV | Turku | Turun Pallo-Veikot | Vitonen | * * | |
| TuTo | Turku | Turun Toverit | Kolmonen | * | |
| TuTo 2 | Turku | Turun Toverit / 2 | Kutonen | * | |
| TuWe | Turku | Turun Weikot | Nelonen | * | |
| TuWe 2 | Turku | Turun Weikot / 2 | Kutonen | * | |
| TuWe 3 | Turku | Turun Weikot / 3 | Kutonen | * | |
| UPK | Uusikaupunki | Uudenkaupungin Pallokerho | Nelonen | * | |
| VG-62 | Naantali | VG-62 Naantali | Kolmonen | * * | |
| Wilpas | Salo | Salon Vilpas | Kolmonen | * * | |
| Wilpas 2 | Salo | Salon Vilpas / 2 | Vitonen | * | |
| Wilpas 3 | Salo | Salon Vilpas / 3 | Kutonen | * | |
| ÅIFK | Turku | Idrottsföreningen Kamraterna i Åbo | Kakkonen | * * * | |
| ÅIFK 2 | Turku | Idrottsföreningen Kamraterna i Åbo / 2 | Vitonen | * | |
| ÅIFK 3 | Turku | Idrottsföreningen Kamraterna i Åbo / 3 | Vitonen | * | |

== League Competitions ==
SPL Turkun piiri run the following league competitions:

=== Men's Football ===
- Division 3 - Kolmonen - one section
- Division 4 - Nelonen - one section
- Division 5 - Vitonen - two sections
- Division 6 - Kutonen - three sections

=== Ladies Football ===
- Division 3 - Kolmonen - one section
