= Seiska (football) =

Finnish football level

Seiska (in Finnish) Sjuan (in Swedish)
- Country: Finland
- Number of clubs: 24
- Level on pyramid: 8 (1973–2023); 9 (2024–)
- Promotion to: Kutonen
- Domestic cup: Finnish Cup
- Current: 2024 Seiska

Seiska or VII divisioona is the ninth level in the Finnish football league system. The number of teams that compete each season can vary. The VII divisioona was introduced in 1973 and in the mid-2000's it became known as the Seiska (Number Seven in English and Sjuan in Swedish). In theory, Seiska is the last league in Finland where a club can go all the way and become Veikkausliiga champions.

== Competition ==
The clubs in the Seiska are divided in 2 groups decided by geographical location. During the course of a season (starting in April and ending in October) teams play each other once. The groups then split approximately in half and the clubs play another round of one match against each other. The top teams in each Seiska group are normally promoted to the Kutonen.

In the past there were more divisions and in the 1980s there was a lower tier VIII divisioona level. In 2002 Seiska comprised 5 divisions with 64 teams affiliated to the SPL Helsingin piiri.

== Notable clubs ==
=== Helsingin Palloseura ===
Helsingin Palloseura (HPS) won the Finnish football championship (Mestaruussarja) 9 times and they also played in the European Cup, against Stade de Reims in 1958–59. In 1999 they were forced to abandon their place in the Kakkonen and reformed in Section 1 of the Seiska for the 2000 season. In their first season they finished in ninth place in their section and spent two more seasons at this level before gaining promotion at the end of the 2002 campaign under player coach Harri Hiltunen.

== Current clubs - 2021 season ==
Western: Lohko 1 (Section 1)	Western: Lohko 2 (Section 2)	Western: Lokho 3 (Section 3)
Exodus; Fish United; HJS/2; LaPro; ParVi; Pato/2; PiPo 79/2; SOHO SS; Toteemit	ACE/2; AC Darra; FC HaPa; HIF; Ilves-Kissat 2; FC Kangasala/2; FC Kaveriporukka; KU-68; FC Lasten	Apassit/2; Dynamo UTD; FC Helmi Jätkä; IkU/2; Ilves/3; Kristallipalatsi; MouMa; Roxbury JK; TyPS

Southern: Lohko 1 (Section 1)	Southern: Lohko 2 (Section 2)	Southern: Lokho 3 (Section 3)
Cosmos; Kilo IF/2; MoPo; OT-77; FC POHU/Kova Kamppi; Roxbury JK Hki; AC StaSi/Europort; Tolsa	HakPa; HeKuLa; Käpylän Sekunda; FC Lähliö; FC Pakila; FC POHU/Swigu; FC Puimur	FC Kontu/TDJ; KPOSE/CRPS FC; Kullervo; Ponnistus/TK; AS RaPe; Trikiinit; Valtti/3; JJ Vepo
