= Vitonen =

Vitonen (in Finnish) Femman (in Swedish)
- Country: Finland
- Number of clubs: 228
- Level on pyramid: 6 (1973–2023); 7 (2024–)
- Promotion to: Nelonen
- Relegation to: Kutonen
- Current: 2024 Vitonen

Vitonen or V divisioona is the seventh level in the Finnish football league system and comprises 228 teams. The V divisioona was introduced in 1973 and in the mid-1990s became known as the Vitonen (Number Five in English and Femman in Swedish). Until the end of 2023, Vitonen was the sixth-highest level in Finnish football league system, but after the formation of the new second-tier Ykkösliiga, Vitonen dropped down one level in pyramid to create a new seventh-tier Vitonen.

== The competition ==
There are 228 clubs in the Vitonen, divided in 22 groups of 7 to 19 teams each representing a geographical area. During the course of a season (starting in April and ending in October) each club normally plays the others twice, once at their home ground and once at that of their opponents. The exception is the 19 team Keski-Suomi division where teams play each other once. The top team in each Vitonen group is normally promoted or qualifies for a promotion playoff to the Nelonen and the lowest placed teams may be relegated to the Kutonen.

== Administration ==
Teams within the Vitonen are eligible to compete in the Suomen Cup and the Suomen Regions' Cup. The clubs are normally listed in an abbreviated form and their full names can be viewed by referring to the List of clubs.

== Current clubs - 2021-Season ==
Helsinki: Lohko 1 (Section 1)	Helsinki: Lohko 2 (Section 2)	Helsinki: Lohko 3 (Section 3)
AC StaSi; Arsenal; Ellas; FC BrBr; FC POHU/LostKurd; FC POHU/Simpsons; FFR; HJK-j/Kmäki; HePu; SAPA/3	Atlantis FC/SOB; FC East; FC HEIV; Kurvin Vauhti; MPS/4; PPV/2; Ponnistajat; RoU/Naamiomiehet; Valtti; Vatanspor	FC FINNKURD; FC Hieho; FC Pihlajisto/LEPRE; HIFK/3; HJK-j/Lsalo; PH-99; PPV/Seos; ToTe/Avauspotku; Vesa/Töölö; WäSy
Uusimaa: Lohko 1 (Section 1)	Uusimaa: Lohko 2 (Section 2)	Uusimaa: Lohko 3 (Section 3)
BK-46/2; EPS/2; FC HIK/2; FC Lohja; FC RaHi; FC WILD; HooGee/2; Kasiysi/Miehet; KyIF/II; MasKi/2	AC Vantaa/2; EPS/Rivals; EsPa/2; FC G.A.B; HooGee/1; Kilo IF/3; NJS/2; OT-77; PuM; RiRa/Ug 09	FC Linnunpojat; Futura/II; HC - MD; HooGee/3; IVU; KelA; KoiPS/Cold Stars; KOPSE/3; SibboV/2; TiPS/2
Uusimaa: Lohko 4 (Section 4)	Kaakkois-Suomi (South-East Finland) Itälohko (East Section)	Kaakkois-Suomi (South-East Finland) Länsilohko (West Section)
Apollo; FC Korso/United; FC Vantaa/Tumu; Futura/Akatemia; JäPS/2; KoiPS; K-UP/HC Skavaböle; Naseva; NouLa/Lyseo; RiPS/2	FC PotkuPallo; JK Bulls; O Viesti; Ri-Pa; RPS Lions; StU; ViSa	HaTP; Jäntevä Ukot; Kajastus; LIK; PoPo; Purha; Sudet/3; VKajo; VoPpK
Itä-Suomi (Eastern Finland): Lohko A (Section A)	Itä-Suomi (Eastern Finland): Lohko B (Section B)	Itä-Suomi (Eastern Finland): Lohko C (Section C)
AFC Keltik; FC Pogosta; JoPS /3; LehPa /2; LehPa /3; PoPS-78; SC Riverball /2; Yllätys /2	AC BARCA; JuPS /2; KiuPa; LaPa-95; NP-H /JuPy; PAVE; Raiku	AS KaWe; HuPa; KarTe; KJK; RautU; SuPa; ToU /2
Itä-Suomi (Eastern Finland): Lohko D (Section D)	Keski-Suomi (Central Finland)	Pohjois-Suomi (Northern Finland): Oulu
FC Tarzan; HarTe; Kings SC; Kuopion Elo; SoU /2; ZSKA; Zulimanit /PappaZulut	FC Saarijärvi; FCV/Reds; Harjun Potku; Huki; JIlves III; JoSePa; KaDy; LaPa; Martti; Mestarit; MultiAnts; Mustarastas; MuurY; Nousu; Nousu 2; PaRi; PaRi 2; PetPet; Urho	FC Suola; HauPa 3; Herkku-Papat; IVFC; KTU; Pattijoen Tempaus; Real Oulu; Tervarit-jr
Keski-Pohjanmaa (Central Ostrobothnia)	Vaasa	Satakunta
Esse IK II; FC Folk; FC YPA III; IFS; DEPO; KP-V; KUF; LBK; OuHu; RyPK-84; Såka; Tarmo; TUS II	ABC Oldboys; APV; FC Brändöpojkarna; FC Kuffen/2; I-JBK; Karhu /3; KJV /Kanu; KuRy; SIF /2; SuSi; TeTe; VäVi	FC Ankkalinna; FC Eurajoki; FC HaPo; FC Ulvila2; IKiri; KaPa; MInto; MuSa3; MäKi; Nasta2; P-Iirot3; PoPa; ReKu; RuosV; TOVE2
Tampere: Lohko 1 (Section 1)	Tampere: Lohko 2 (Section 2)	Turku: Lohko 1 (Section 1)
FC Melody; FC Polla /2; HST; KylVe; LaPro; LeKi-futis; OldSchool; ParVi Käpy; PJK 2; Sopu; UrPS; ViiPV	ACE; Apassit; AS-Team; FC Futarit; FC Rellu; FC Teivo; PoNU Bk; SW; TaPa; TKT KooTee; Tuisku Daltonit; Valo	FC RP; Heitto; JIK; KaaPS; KaaRe; KuuLa; LTU 2; Nagu IF; RaiTeePee; TuWe 2; Wilpas 2; ÅCF
Turku: Lohko 2 (Section 2)		
AC Sauvo; AFC Campus; Atletico Ispoinen; FC Bosna; FC Komar; FC NU; FC Turku; Lieto 2; LoPS; PaiHa; TuKV

== Seasons - League Tables ==
2000s:	2000	2001	2002	2003	2004	2005	2006	2007	2008	2009
2010s:	2010	2011	2012	2013	2014	2015	2016	2017	2018	2019
2020s:	2020	2021	2022	2023	2024	2025				
