= Kutonen =

Eighth level of the Finnish football league system

Kutonen (in Finnish) Sexan (in Swedish)
- Country: Finland
- Number of clubs: 265
- Level on pyramid: 7 (1973–2023); 8 (2024–)
- Promotion to: Vitonen
- Relegation to: Seiska
- Domestic cup: Finnish Cup
- Current: 2024 Kutonen

Kutonen or VI divisioona is the eighth level in the Finnish football league system and comprises 265 teams. The VI divisioona was introduced in 1973 and in the mid-1990s became known as the Kutonen (Number Six in English and Sexan in Swedish).

== The competition ==
There are 265 clubs in the Kutonen, divided in 27 groups of 5 to 16 teams, each representing a geographical area. During the course of a season (starting in April and ending in October) each club normally plays the others twice, once at their home ground and once at that of their opponents. However in those divisions with more than 12 teams, the competition is arranged so that teams play each other once. The top team in each Kutonen group is normally promoted or qualifies for a promotion playoff to the Vitonen. In the Helsinki divisions the lowest placed teams may be relegated to the Seiska.

== Administration ==
Teams within the Kutonen are eligible to compete in the Suomen Cup and the Suomen Regions' Cup. The clubs are normally listed in an abbreviated form and their full names can be viewed by referring to the List of clubs.

== 2012 Season ==
Helsinki: Lohko 1 (Section 1)	Helsinki: Lohko 2 (Section 2)	Helsinki: Lohko 3 (Section 3)
AC Balls; AC StaSi/Europort; Arsenal/2; FC FC; FC POHU/Shrimps; FC Playmates; Geishan Pallo; HakPa; HeKuLa; KPPK; Kullervo; Käpylän Sekunda; Ruila; SS Stanley; Tavastia/FC Mojo; Zoom	Colo-Colo/UNO; Dal; FC Aztecas; FC Kiffen/3; FC POHU/Susijengi; FC POHU/Swigu; Geishan Pallo/Pallo; HeMan; HePu/PaLa; KPR; LauttaPallo; Ompun Pomppu; PETO; Stallions; ToTe/Traktor	AC Stoppi/FK Torni; Cosmos; Ellas/2; FC Kontu/HSP; FC POHU/Panostus; FFR/Väiski; Gnistan/Roots; HDS/Express; HJK-j/Töölö; HePuLi; KuRa; LeJa/BJS; Strikers/Bertil; Töölön Taisto/Akatemia; Veijarit; Vesa/Stadi
Helsinki: Lohko 4 (Section 4)	Uusimaa: Lohko 1 (Section 1)	Uusimaa: Lohko 2 (Section 2)
AFC EMU; FC Härät; FC IKHTYS; FC KaKe; FC Kontu/3; FC Puimur; FC Viikingit/05; HerTo/2; JJ Vepo; LPS/2; MPS/Atletico Akatemia; MaKu/Legends; PuiU/86; Ruisku/09; Spartak/Itä; Ylis-78	FC Glid; Hukat; IIF; KarlU; Kasiysi/Rovers; LJK; NuPS/Kax; VeVe; ViTa; VJS/2	AP; EPS/RPS; EsPa/NJA; F.C.B.; FC Pallokalat/Niittokone; FC W; Honka/Ribis; KAKE; Kilo IF/4; OK
Uusimaa: Lohko 3 (Section 3)	Uusimaa: Lohko 4 (Section 4)	Uusimaa: Lohko 5 (Section 5)
CF DR; FC Babylon/Z; FC Karzinkarjut/2; FC Kyllikki; FC LP; HäPS; Kasiysi/TN; Kilo IF/1; LePa/2; PEP	DT-65; GrIFK/2; I-HK/OMV; IVPA; Kasiysi/Lippis; Kilo IF/2; KP-75/Karisma; PuPo; RiRa/Ug 2; RT-88	FC Insiders; FCD/HMHS; I-HK/Reserve; KoPa; KP-75; Pelikaani; RaKe; RePa -93; TuPS/2; VAP
Uusimaa: Lohko 6 (Section 6)	Kaakkois-Suomi (South-East Finland) Etelälohko (South Section)	Kaakkois-Suomi (South-East Finland) Itälohko (East Section)
AC JazzPa; Ares -86; AskU; FC Tuusula; Jäppärä; JoKi/River; KP-75/SaPo; MU; NouLa/Jakki; RiPS/III	Atomit FC; FC Etapo; FC SuSi; HiHi; KarPo; KoRe; PeKa/2; Purha/2; SKT-futis	FC PaSa HuPS; Liry; MoNsa; PEPO/3; SiU 2/RPS 2; STPS Estura; Veiterä
Kaakkois-Suomi (South-East Finland) Pohjoinenlohko (North Section)	Keski-Pohjanmaa (Central Ostrobothnia): Lohko A (Section A)	Keski-Pohjanmaa (Central Ostrobothnia): Lohko B (Section B)
FC Kausala; FC-84; JaVo; Kponsi; MYPA FC; MäJä; PaPe/2; PePo; Redball	EBK; FF Kickers; FoBK; Golden Boys; IFS II; Jeppo FF; MunU; Oldboys; PeFF II; Prs Into; PUF; Team NIK	FC-92; HK; KäKa; MJK; Ura
Keski-Pohjanmaa (Central Ostrobothnia): Lohko C (Section C)	Vaasa: Lohko 1 (Section 1)	Vaasa: Lohko 2 (Section 2)
Friska Viljor; GBK III; HBK II; KPS; Reima II; Väsymättömät	BK-48; Black Islanders; FC Brändöpojkarna 2; FC Jukola; FC Kiisto /3; FC KOMU II; Norrvalla FF /2; SIF 3; VaVe	Jurva-70; Karhu Young Boys; KoFF /PeIK 2; Malax IF /2; Pjelax FC; Sporting 2; TePa; Töjby FC
Vaasa: Lohko 3 (Section 3)	Tampere: Lohko 1 (Section 1)	Tampere: Lohko 2 (Section 2)
HyMy; KyVo; Laihia SC; LeJy; NuPa; Ponnistus /2; Sisu-Pallo /2; Virkiä /2	FC Loppi; FJK 2; Jags 2; JanPa; LaVe 2; ParVi 2; TNS TFT; UrPS /2	City Norsulauma; Dynamo UTD; FC Kaveriporukka; FC Potku; Loiske Toivot; Soho SS; TahVe /2; VesVi; VJ09
Tampere: Lohko 3 (Section 3)	Tampere: Lohko 4 (Section 4)	Tampere: Lohko 5 (Section 5)
AC Juice; FC Polla 1; FC TCC; FC Trompi; HirPy; Ilves 2; KaVo /2; TahVe	AC Darra; Ikurin Vire; NePa Talent; NoPS 3; Pelikassit; PiPo-79; TamU-K; TaPa 2; YlöR /2	FC PaPo; FC Tribe; FC Vapsi; IkU; MouMa; NoPS 2; NoPy; SW /2; ÄJK
Turku: Lohko 1 (Section 1)	Turku: Lohko 2 (Section 2)	Turku: Lohko 3 (Section 3)
BFB; FC Dynamo; FC Koivu; Functio Laesa; LTU 3; PiPS 2; TuHa; TuPV; ÅCF 2	AU; CELT'S; FC KyPS; Pamaus; RaiFu; Ryhti; Torre Calcio; TuKV 2; TuWe 3	AC Sauvo 2; FC Halikko; Peimari Utd; Ponteva; SaPeLi; SoVo 2; TaaJä; Wilpas 3
