= Finnish football league system =

League competition

The Finnish football league system is a series of interconnected leagues for club football in Finland. The levels two to nine are managed by the Finnish FA.

== System ==
As of 2025

Level	Total Clubs ()	League(s)/Division(s)									
1-4	64	National Divisions									
1	12	Veikkausliiga; 12 teams 1+1 relegations									
2	10	Ykkösliiga; 10 teams 1+1 promotions, 1+1 relegations									
3	12	Ykkönen; 12 teams 1+1 promotions, 2 relegations									
4	30	Kakkonen Group A 10 teams			Kakkonen Group B 10 teams			Kakkonen Group C 10 teams			
5-9		Regional Divisions									
5	104	Kolmonen South A 12 teams	Kolmonen South B 12 teams	Kolmonen South C 12 teams	Kolmonen West A 12 teams	Kolmonen West B 12 teams	Kolmonen West C 12 teams	Kolmonen East AC1; 8 teams	Kolmonen East AC2; 8 teams	Kolmonen East B 12 teams	Kolmonen North; 10 teams
6		Nelonen South; 4 Groups			Nelonen West; 4 Groups			Nelonen East; 3 Groups			Nelonen North
7		Vitonen South; 8 Groups			Vitonen West; 7 Groups			Vitonen East; 4 Groups			Vitonen North; 2 Groups
8		Kutonen South; 11 Groups			Kutonen West; 12 Groups			Kutonen East			
9		Seiska South; 3 Groups			Seiska West; 2 Groups						

== Cup competitions ==
Clubs at all levels are eligible for the Finnish Cup. Clubs of Kolmonen and below are eligible to compete in the Regions' Cup. Clubs of Vitonen and below are eligible to compete in the Regions' Roots Cup.

The Finnish League Cup is a cup competition for top tier clubs played during the winter months before the start of the league season. It was replaced in 2017 by the Finnish Cup group stage, but returned in 2022 after the reformation of the Finnish Cup.
