= List of football clubs in Finland – K =

This is a list of football clubs in Finland.

== League listings ==
- Championship - Veikkausliiga
- Division 1 - Ykkönen
- Division 2 - Kakkonen
- Division 3 - Kolmonen
- Division 4 - Nelonen
- Division 5 - Vitonen
- Division 6 - Kutonen
- Division 7 - Seiska

== Alphabetical listings ==
Contents: A B C D E F G H I J K L M N O P Q R S T U V W X Y Z Å Ä Ö

=== K ===
Abbreviation	Settlement	District	Official name	Division	Cup	Other information
KaaPo	Kaarina	Turku	Kaarinan Pojat	Kolmonen	* * *	
KaaPS	Kaarina	Turku	Kaarinan Palloseura	Vitonen	* *	
KaaRe	Kaarina	Turku	Kaarinan Reipas	Vitonen	* *	
KaaRe 2	Kaarina	Turku	Kaarinan Reipas / 2	Kutonen	*	
KaDy	Jyväskylä	Keski-Suomi	FC Kampuksen Dynamo	Nelonen	*	
KaDy II	Jyväskylä	Keski-Suomi	FC Kampuksen Dynamo / II	Vitonen	*	
KajHa	Kajaani	Pohjois-Suomi	Kajaanin Haka	Kolmonen	* * *	Tier 2 (9 seasons): 1968, 1970–71, 1985–86, 1993–94, 1998-99; Tier 3 (21 seasons): 1975, 1979, 1981–84, 1987, 1990–92, 1995–97, 2000–05, 2007, 2010
KaIK/TePa	Kaskinen (Kaskö) / Teuva	Vaasa	Kaskö Idrottsklubb / Teuvan Pallo	Nelonen	* *	
Kajastus	Kaipiainen, Kouvola	Kaakkois-Suomi	Kaipiaisten Kajastus	Kutonen	*	
KAKE	Tapiola, Espoo	Uusimaa	Kaupinkallion Keila	Kutonen	*	
KaNsU	Kallträsk, Kristinestad (Kristiinankaupunki)	Vaasa	Kallträskin Nuorisoseuran Urheilijat	Kutonen	*	
KaPa	Kankaanpää	Satakunta	Kankaanpään Pallo	Vitonen	*	
KaPa-51	Kangasniemi	Keski-Suomi	Kangasniemen Palloilijat	Kolmonen	*	
KaPy	Espoo	Uusimaa	Kauklahden V- Ja U-seura Pyrintö	Kutonen	*	
Karhu	Kauhajoki	Vaasa	Kauhajoen Karhu	Kolmonen	* *	
Karhu /3	Kauhajoki	Vaasa	Kauhajoen Karhu / 3	Kutonen	*	
Karhu Young Boys	Kauhajoki	Vaasa	Kauhajoen Karhu / Young Boys	Vitonen	*	
Karjalohjan Biisonit	Karjalohja	Uusimaa	Karjalohjan Biisonit	Nelonen	* *	
KarlU	Karjalohja	Uusimaa	Karjalohjan Urheilijat	Kutonen	*	
Karpo	Karhula, Kotka	Kaakkois-Suomi	Karhulan Pojat	Kutonen	* *	
KarTe	Karttula	Itä-Suomi	Karttulan Tennisseura	Vitonen	*	
Kasiysi Miehet	Espoo	Uusimaa	FC Kasiysi Espoo / Miehet	Vitonen	* *	
Kasiysi Rocky	Espoo	Uusimaa	FC Kasiysi Espoo / Rocky	Nelonen	* *	
KasvU	Kauniainen	Uusimaa	Kasavuoren Urheilijat	Kutonen	*	
KaVo	Kangasala	Tampere	Kangasalan Voitto	Nelonen	* *	
KelA	Kellokoski	Uusimaa	Kellokosken Alku	Vitonen	*	
KemPa	Keminmaa	Pohjois-Suomi	Keminmaan Pallo	Nelonen	* *	
KesPa	Vantaa	Uusimaa	Keskon Pallo	Kutonen	*	
KeuPa	Keuruu	Keski-Suomi	Keuruun Pallo	Nelonen	* *	
KieHa	Ähtäri	Vaasa	Ähtärin Kiekko-Haukat	Kutonen	*	
Kiffen	Helsinki	Helsinki	FC Kiffen 08	Kakkonen	* * *	
Kiffen/2	Kruununhaka	Helsinki	FC Kiffen / 2	Nelonen	*	
KiiRi	Kiiminki	Pohjois-Suomi	Kiimingin Riento	Vitonen	*	
KiKi	Kisko, Salo	Turku	Kiskon Kiskojat	Kutonen	*	
Kilo IF 1	Espoo	Uusimaa	Kilo Idrottsförening / 1	Kutonen	*	
Kilo IF 2	Espoo	Uusimaa	Kilo Idrottsförening / 2	Kutonen	*	
Kilo IF 3	Espoo	Uusimaa	Kilo Idrottsförening / 3	Vitonen	*	
Kilo IF 4	Espoo	Uusimaa	Kilo Idrottsförening / 4	Kutonen	*	
Kilo IF 5	Espoo	Uusimaa	Kilo Idrottsförening / 5	Kutonen	*	
Kiri	Kotka	Kaakkois-Suomi	Kotkan Kiri	Vitonen	* *	
KiuPa	Kiuruvesi	Itä-Suomi	Kiuruveden Palloilijat	Vitonen	*	
Kiva	Karstula	Keski-Suomi	Karstulan Kiva	Vitonen	*	
KJK	Kuopio	Itä-Suomi	Kuopion Jalkapallokerho	Vitonen	*	
KJV /Kanu	Kortesjärvi	Vaasa	Kortesjärven Järvi-Veikot / Kanu	Vitonen	* *	
Kiksi	Olari, Espoo	Uusimaa	Olarin Kiksi	Vitonen	* *	Another abbreviation is OK.
Klubi-04	Helsinki	Helsinki	Klubi-04	Ykkönen	* * *	
KoFF/PeIK	Korsnäs / Petalax (Petolahti)	Vaasa	Korsnäs Fotbollsförening / Petalax Idrottsklubb	Nelonen	*	
KoFF-PeIK/2	Kaskö (Kaskinen) / Teuva	Vaasa	Kaskö Idrottsklubb / Teuvan Pallo / 2	Kutonen	*	
KoiPS	Koivukylä, Vantaa	Uusimaa	Koivukylän Palloseura	Vitonen	* *	
KoiPS A	Koivukylä, Vantaa	Uusimaa	Koivukylän Palloseura / A	Kutonen	*	
KoiPS Harraste	Koivukylä, Vantaa	Uusimaa	Koivukylän Palloseura / Harraste	Kutonen	*	
Koitto	Noormarkku, Pori	Satakunta	Noormarkun Koitto	Nelonen	*	
Kolarin Kontio	Kolari	Pohjois-Suomi	Kolarin Kontio	Nelonen	*	
KonnU	Konnevesi	Keski-Suomi	Konneveden Urheilijat	Vitonen	*	
KoPa	Lemi	Kaakkois-Suomi	Kotajärven Pallo	Nelonen	* *	
KoPa	Kokemäki	Satakunta	Kokemäen Pallo	Nelonen	*	
KoPa	Vantaa	Uusimaa	Korson Palloilijat	Kutonen	*	
KOPSE	Vantaa	Uusimaa	Korson Palloseura	Kolmonen	* *	
KOPSE 2	Korso, Vantaa	Uusimaa	Korson Palloseura / 2	Vitonen	*	
KOPSE 3	Vantaa	Uusimaa	Korson Palloseura / 3	Kutonen	*	
KoRe	Kotka	Kaakkois-Suomi	Kotkan Reipas	Kolmonen	* *	
Koskenpojat	Valkeakoski	Tampere	Football Club Haka / Koskenpojat	Kolmonen	*	Previously known as Valkeakosken Koskenpojat (VaKP).
KP-75 / Sapo	Kerava	Uusimaa	Keravan Pallo -75 / Sapo	Vitonen	*	
KP-75 2	Kerava	Uusimaa	Keravan Pallo -75 / 2	Kutonen	*	
KP-75/Kyytipojat	Kerava	Uusimaa	Keravan Pallo -75 / Kyytipojat	Vitonen	*	
KP-87	Kokkola	Keski-Pohjanmaa	Kokkolan Pallo -87	Kutonen	*	
K-Pallo	Kalajoki	Keski-Pohjanmaa	Kalajoen Pallo	Nelonen	*	
KPonsi	Kouvola	Kaakkois-Suomi	Korian Ponsi	Vitonen	* *	
KPPK	Helsinki	Helsinki	Kirkonpellon Pallokerho	Kutonen	*	
KPR	Karhupuisto, Kallio	Helsinki	Karhupuiston Vartijat FC	Kutonen	* *	
KPV	Kokkola	Keski-Pohjanmaa	Kokkolan Palloveikot	Kakkonen	* * *	
KP-V	Kaustinen	Keski-Pohjanmaa	Kaustisen Pohjan-Veikot	Vitonen	* *	
KPV II	Kokkola	Keski-Pohjanmaa	Kokkolan Palloveikot / II	Kutonen	*	
KP-V II	Kaustinen	Keski-Pohjanmaa	Kaustisen Pohjan-Veikot / II	Kutonen	*	
Kraft	Närpes (Närpiö)	Vaasa	Närpes Kraft Fotbollsförening	Kakkonen	* *	
Kraft/2	Närpes (Närpiö)	Vaasa	Närpes Kraft Fotbollsförening / 2	Vitonen	*	
Kristallipalatsi	Nokia	Tampere	Kuninkaallinen Kristallipalatsi 2000	Vitonen	* *	
KTP	Kotka	Kaakkois-Suomi	Kotkan Työväen Palloilijat	Kakkonen	* * *	KTP Kotka 1: see KooTeePee Kotka; KTP Kotka 2 Tier 3 (3 seasons): 2008-09, 2011
KUF	Kållby (Kolppi), Pedersöre	Keski-Pohjanmaa	Kållby Ungdomsförening	Kutonen	*	
KuKi	Kurkimäki, Kuopio	Itä-Suomi	Kurkimäen Kisa	Nelonen	*	
Kullervo	Kallio	Helsinki	Helsingin Kullervo	Kutonen	*	
Kultsu FC	Lappeenranta	Kaakkois-Suomi	Kultsu FC (Joutsenon Kullervo)	Kolmonen	* *	
Kultsu FC/2	Lappeenranta	Kaakkois-Suomi	Kultsu FC / 2	Kutonen	* *	
Kungliga Wasa CF	Vaasa (Vasa)	Vaasa	Kungliga Wasa CF	Nelonen	* *	
KuP	Punkaharju	Kaakkois-Suomi	Kulennoisten Pallo	Nelonen	*	
KuPS	Kuopio	Itä-Suomi	Kuopion Palloseura	Veikkausliiga	* * *	
KuRa	Helsinki	Helsinki	KuRa	Kutonen	*	
Kurvin Vauhti	Alppiharju	Helsinki	Kurvin Vauhti	Vitonen	* *	
KuRy	Kurikka	Vaasa	Kurikan Ryhti	Kutonen	* *	
KuuLa	Turku	Turku	Kuuvuoren Laaki	Kutonen	*	
KyIF FCK 1	Kirkkonummi	Uusimaa	Kyrkslätt Idrottsförening / FC Kirkkonummi 1	Kolmonen	* *	
KyIF/FCK 2	Kirkkonummi	Uusimaa	Kyrkslätt Idrottsförening / FC Kirkkonummi 2	Vitonen	*	
KylVe	Kylmäkoski	Tampere	Kylmäkosken Veikot	Vitonen	*	
KäPa	Käpylä	Helsinki	Käpylän Pallo	Kolmonen	* * *	
KäPa/PuLe	Käpylä	Helsinki	Käpylän Pallo / Putoava Lehti	Nelonen	*	
