= List of football clubs in Finland – F =

This is a list of football clubs in Finland.

== League listings ==
- Championship - Veikkausliiga
- Division 1 - Ykkönen
- Division 2 - Kakkonen
- Division 3 - Kolmonen
- Division 4 - Nelonen
- Division 5 - Vitonen
- Division 6 - Kutonen
- Division 7 - Seiska

== Alphabetical listings ==
Contents: A B C D E F G H I J K L M N O P Q R S T U V W X Y Z Å Ä Ö

=== F ===
Abbreviation	Settlement	District	Official name	Division	Cup	Other information
F.C.B	Espoo	Uusimaa	F.C. Bärcelona	Kutonen	* *	
FC ALPC	Helsinki	Helsinki	FC A la Plancha Calamar	Kutonen	* *	
FC Babylon X	Espoo	Uusimaa	Football Club Babylon / X	Vitonen	* *	
FC Babylon Z	Espoo	Uusimaa	FC Babylon / Z	Kutonen	*	
FC Boda	Kimitoön	Turku	FC Boda	Kolmonen	* *	
FC Bombers	Helsinki	Helsinki	FC Bombers	Kutonen	*	
FC Bosna	Turku	Turku	Suomi-Bosnia seura	Vitonen	* *	
FC Botan	Oulunkylä	Helsinki	FC Botan	Vitonen	*	
FC Brändöpojkarna	Vaasa	Vaasa	FC Brändöpojkarna	Vitonen	*	
FC BrBr	Helsinki	Helsinki	FC Brunnsparkens Bröder	Kutonen	* *	
FC Degis	Laajasalo	Helsinki	FC Degis	Nelonen	* *	
FC Dynamo	Turku	Turku	FC Dynamo	Kutonen	*	
FC East	Myllypuro	Helsinki	FC East United	Kutonen	*	
FC Elite	Helsinki	Helsinki	FC Elite	Seiska	*	
FC Espoo	Espoo	Uusimaa	FC Espoo	Kakkonen	* * *	
FC Espoo Akatemia	Espoo	Uusimaa	FC Espoo / Akatemia	Kolmonen	* *	
FC Etapo	Kotka	Kaakkois-Suomi	FC Etapo	Kutonen	*	
FC Eurajoki	Eurajoki	Satakunta	FC Eurajoki	Vitonen	*	
FC FC	Helsinki	Helsinki	FC Football Club	Kutonen	*	
FC Folk	Vatjusjärvi, Haapavesi	Keski-Pohjanmaa	FC Folk	Vitonen	* *	
FC Futura	Porvoo	Uusimaa	FC Futura	Kakkonen	* * *	
FC Futarit	Tampere	Tampere	Tampereen FC Futarit	Kutonen	* *	
FC G.A.B	Espoo	Uusimaa	FC Grani Airbags	Kutonen	* *	
FC Haka	Valkeakoski	Tampere	FC Haka	Veikkausliiga	* * *	
FC Halikko	Halikko, Salo	Turku	FC Halikko	Kutonen	*	
FC HEIV	Helsinki	Helsinki	FC Helsingfors Idrottsvänner	Kutonen	* *	
FC Hieho	Helsinki	Helsinki	FC Hieho	Seiska	* *	
FC HIK	Hanko	Uusimaa	FC Hangö Idrottsklubb	Kolmonen	*	
FC Honka	Espoo	Uusimaa	FC Honka	Veikkausliiga	* * *	
FC Hämeenlinna	Hämeenlinna	Tampere	FC Hämeenlinna	Ykkönen	* * *	
FC Härät	Helsinki	Helsinki	FC Härät	Kutonen	*	
FC IKHTYS	Kurkimäki	Helsinki	FC IKHTYS	Kutonen	* *	
FC Insiders	Nurmijärvi	Uusimaa	FC Insiders	Vitonen	*	
FC Insiders Sekunda Utd	Nurmijärvi	Uusimaa	FC Insiders / Sekunda Utd	Kutonen	*	
FC Inter	Turku	Turku	FC Inter Turku	Veikkausliiga	* * *	
FC Inter 2	Turku	Turku	FC Inter Turku / 2	Nelonen	*	
FC International	Oulu	Pohjois-Suomi	FC International	Vitonen	*	
FC Jazz-j	Pori	Satakunta	FC Jazz Juniorit	Kakkonen	* * *	
FC Jazz-J2	Pori	Satakunta	FC Jazz Juniorit / 2	Nelonen	* *	
FC Jazz-J3	Pori	Satakunta	FC Jazz Juniorit/ 3	Vitonen	*	
FC Jukola	Vaasa	Vaasa	FC Jukolan Pallo	Kutonen	*	
FC Kaarina	Kaarina	Turku	FC Kaarina	Kutonen	*	
FC K-Jazz	Äänekoski	Keski-Suomi	FC Keitelejazz	Vitonen	* *	
FC KaKe	Siltamäki	Helsinki	FC Kanuunoiden Kerma	Kutonen	*	
FC Karzinkarjut	Espoo	Uusimaa	FC Karzinkarjut	Kutonen	*	
FC Kausala	Kouvola	Kaakkois-Suomi	FC Kausala	Vitonen	*	
FC Kiisto	Vaasa	Vaasa	Vaasan Kiisto	Kakkonen	* * *	
FC Kiisto a-team	Vaasa	Vaasa	FC Kiisto / a-team	Kolmonen	*	
FC Koivu	Turku	Turku	FC Koivu	Kutonen	*	
FC Komar	Turku	Turku	FC Komar Kurdistan	Kutonen	*	
FC KOMU	Korsholm	Vaasa	FC KOMU (FC Korsholm Mustasaari)	Kolmonen	* *	
FC Kontu	Helsinki	Helsinki	FC Kontu Itä-Helsinki	Kolmonen	* *	
FC Kontu/2	Kontula, Mellunkylä	Helsinki	FC Kontu Itä-Helsinki / 2	Nelonen	* *	
FC Kontu/3	Kontula, Mellunkylä	Helsinki	FC Kontu Itä-Helsinki /3	Seiska	*	
FC Kontu/4	Kontula, Mellunkylä	Helsinki	FC Kontu Itä-Helsinki / 4	Kutonen	*	
FC Kontu/HSP	Kontula, Mellunkylä	Helsinki	FC Kontu Itä-Helsinki / HSP	Seiska	*	
FC KooTeePee	Kotka	Kaakkois-Suomi	FC KooTeePee	Ykkönen	* * *	Recent history: KTP Kotka 1 until 2000; KooTeePee Kotka since 2001; Tier 1 (31 seasons): 1948-58, 1963–69, 1979–83, 1999-2000, 2003-08; Tier 2 (19 seasons): 1943/44, 1959–62, 1970–72, 1978, 1984, 1994–98, 2002, 2009-; Tier 3 (15 seasons): 1973-77, 1985–93, 2001
FC Korsholm	Korsholm	Vaasa	FC Korsholm	Kolmonen	* * *	
FC Korsholm /3	Korsholm	Vaasa	FC Korsholm /3	Kutonen	*	
FC Korsholm Young Boys	Korsholm	Vaasa	FC Korsholm / Young Boys	Vitonen	* *	FC Korsholm /2
FC Korso United	Korso, Vantaa	Uusimaa	FC Korso United	Kutonen	* *	
FC Kuffen	Kvevlax, Korsholm	Vaasa	FC Kuffen	Nelonen	*	
FC Kuffen/2	Kvevlax, Korsholm	Vaasa	FC Kuffen / 2	Vitonen	*	
FC Kuitu/1	Vuosaari	Helsinki	FC Kuitu / 2	Vitonen	*	
FC Kuitu/2	Vuosaari	Helsinki	FC Kuitu / 2	Vitonen	*	
FC Kurenpojat	Pudasjärvi	Pohjois-Suomi	FC Kurenpojat	Nelonen	*	
FC Kuusankoski	Kuusankoski	Kaakkois-Suomi	FC Kuusankoski	Kakkonen	* * *	Recent history: PaPe Kuusankoski until 1996; FC Kuusankoski since 1997 (merger with Kumu Kuusankoski); Tier 2 (9 seasons): 1965, 1969–72, 2001-04; Tier 3 (15 seasons): 1973-75, 1995-2000, 2005-10
FC Kyllikki	Espoo	Uusimaa	FC Kyllikki	Kutonen	* *	
FC KyPS	Kyrö, Pöytyä	Turku	FC Kyrön Palloseura	Kutonen	* *	
FC Lahti	Lahti	Uusimaa	FC Lahti	Veikkausliiga	* * *	
FC LaKu	Tampere	Tampere	Lahnavetten Kuninkaat	Kutonen	*	
FC Lepakot	Oulu	Pohjois-Suomi	FC Lepakot	Vitonen	* *	
FC Linnunpojat	Espoo	Uusimaa	FC Linnunpojat	Kutonen	*	
FC Lohja	Lohja	Uusimaa	FC Lohja	Vitonen	* *	
FC Loppi	Loppi	Tampere	FC Loppi	Kutonen	*	
FC Loviisa	Loviisa	Uusimaa	FC Loviisa	Vitonen	* *	
FC Melody	Tampere	Tampere	FC Melody	Vitonen	*	
FC Mikkeli	Mikkeli	Kaakkois-Suomi	FC Mikkeli	No record	*	See MP Mikkeli
FC Muurola	Muurola, Rovaniemi	Pohjois-Suomi	FC Muurola	Nelonen	* *	
FC Nets	Oulu	Pohjois-Suomi	FC Nets	Nelonen	* *	
FC NU	Turku	Turku	FC Nations United	Vitonen	*	
FC Nurmes	Nurmes	Itä-Suomi	FC Nurmes	Vitonen	*	
FC OPA	Oulu	Pohjois-Suomi	FC Oulun Pallo	Kolmonen	* * *	
FC Pakila	Helsinki	Helsinki	FC Pakila	Seiska	* *	
FC PaSa	Imatra	Kaakkois-Suomi	Imatran Pallo-Salamat	Nelonen	* *	Tier 2 (2 seasons): 1967, 1972; Tier 3 (3 seasons): 1993-94, 1998
FC Peltirumpu	Kouvola	Kaakkois-Suomi	FC Peltirumpu	Nelonen	* *	
FC Persia	Turku	Turku	Turun Iranilaisten kulttuuriseura	Kutonen	*	
FC Pesä	Imatra	Kaakkois-Suomi	FC Pesä	Kutonen	*	
FC Pihlajisto/LEPRE	Pihlajisto	Helsinki	FC Pihlajisto / LEPRE	Nelonen	*	
FC Playmates	Helsinki	Helsinki	FC Playmates	Seiska	* *	
FC Pogosta	Ilomantsi	Itä-Suomi	FC Pogosta	Vitonen	*	
FC POHU	Helsinki	Helsinki	FC Pohjois-Haagan Urheilijat	Kolmonen	* *	
FC POHU/2	Pohjois-Haaga	Helsinki	FC Pohjois-Haagan Urheilijat / 2	Vitonen	* *	
FC POHU/LostKurd	Pohjois-Haaga	Helsinki	FC Pohjois-Haagan Urheilijat / LostKurd	Seiska	*	
FC POHU/Playboys	Pohjois-Haaga	Helsinki	FC Pohjois-Haagan Urheilijat / Playboys	Vitonen	*	
FC POHU/Shrimps	Pohjois-Haaga	Helsinki	FC Pohjois-Haagan Urheilijat / Shrimps	Kutonen	*	
FC POHU/Simpsons	Pohjois-Haaga	Helsinki	FC Pohjois-Haagan Urheilijat / Simpsons	Vitonen	*	
FC POHU/Susijengi	Pohjois-Haaga	Helsinki	FC Pohjois-Haagan Urheilijat / Susijengi	Kutonen	*	
FC POHU/Swigu	Pohjois-Haaga	Helsinki	FC Pohjois-Haagan Urheilijat / Swigu	Vitonen	*	
FC Polla /1	Tampere	Tampere	Pallopäät (FC Polla) / 1	Kutonen	*	
FC Polla /2	Tampere	Tampere	Pallopäät (FC Polla) / 2	Vitonen	*	
FC Potku	Tampere	Tampere	FC Tampereen Potku	Kutonen	*	
FC PotkuPallo	Lappeenranta	Kaakkois-Suomi	FC PotkuPallo	Vitonen	*	
FC Puimur	Helsinki	Helsinki	FC Puimur	Kutonen	*	
FC Puotila	Puotila	Helsinki	FC Puotila	Nelonen	*	
FC Puotila/Reservit	Puotila	Helsinki	FC Puotila / Reservit	Seiska	*	
FC RaHi	Nummi-Pusula	Uusimaa	FC Raskas Hiki	Vitonen	*	
FC Rauma	Rauma	Satakunta	FC Rauma	Nelonen	* *	
FC RAI	Oulu	Pohjois-Suomi	FC RAI	Vitonen	* *	
FC RAI 2	Oulu	Pohjois-Suomi	FC RAI / 2	Vitonen	* *	
FC Rellu	Tampere	Tampere	FC Rellu	Kutonen	*	
FC RP	Rusko	Turku	Ruskon Pallo	Vitonen	*	
FC Saarijärvi	Saarijärvi	Keski-Suomi	FC Saarijärvi	Nelonen	*	
FC Samba	Espoo	Uusimaa	Football Club Samba	Vitonen	*	
FC Santa Claus	Rovaniemi	Pohjois-Suomi	FC Santa Claus	Kakkonen	* * *	Recent history: RoRe Rovaniemi until 1992; SantaClaus Rovaniemi since 1993 (merger with RoLa Rovaniemi); Tier 3 (23 seasons): 1978-81, 1984–89, 1991-2000, 2009-
FC Sonnit	Helsinki	Helsinki	FC Sonnit	Seiska	*	
FC Spede	Helsinki	Helsinki	FC Spede	Seiska	* *	
FC Sport	Vaasa	Vaasa	FC Sport-39	Kutonen	*	
FC Stallions	Jakobstad	Keski-Pohjanmaa	FC Stallions	Kutonen	*	
FC Suola	Oulunsalo	Pohjois-Suomi	FC Suola	Vitonen	*	
FC SuSi	Sunila, Kotka	Kaakkois-Suomi	FC Sunilan Sisu	Kutonen	* *	
FC Tampere	Tampere	Tampere	FC Tampere FCT	Nelonen	* *	
FC Tarmo	Kajaani	Pohjois-Suomi	FC Tarmo	Nelonen	* *	
FC Tarzan	Kuopio	Itä-Suomi	FC Tarzan	Vitonen	*	
FC Teivo	Ylöjärvi	Tampere	FC Teivo	Vitonen	* *	
FC Tigers	Tampere	Tampere	FC Tampere / FC Tigers	Kolmonen	*	
FC Tribe	Nokia	Tampere	FC Tribe	Kutonen	* *	
FC Trompi	Tampere	Tampere	FC Trompi	Kutonen	* *	
FC Turku	Turku	Turku	Football Club Turku -82	Vitonen	* *	
FC Tuusula	Tuusula	Uusimaa	FC Tuusula	Vitonen	*	
FC Tykit	Turku	Turku	FC Navaronen Tykit	Kutonen	*	
FC Ulvila	Ulvila	Satakunta	FC Ulvila	Nelonen	*	
FCV	Jyväskylä	Keski-Suomi	FC Vaajakoski	Kolmonen	* * *	
FC Vantaa	Vantaa	Uusimaa	Football Club Vantaa	Vitonen	* *	
FC Vapsi	Vammala	Tampere	FC Vapsi	Vitonen	* *	
FC Västnyland	Raseborg	Uusimaa	FC Västnyland	Nelonen	* *	
FC Västnyland 2	Raseborg	Uusimaa	FC Västnyland /2	Kutonen	*	
FC Viikingit	Helsinki	Helsinki	FC Viikingit	Ykkönen	* * *	
FC Viikingit Ed 2	Vuosaari	Helsinki	FC Viikingit Edustus / 2	Kolmonen	* *	
FC Viikingit/05	Vuosaari, East Helsinki	Helsinki	FC Viikingit / 05	Kutonen	*	
FC Villisiat	Elimäki, Kouvola	Kaakkois-Suomi	FC Villisiat	Nelonen	* *	
FC ViP	Virrat	Tampere	FC Pallokarhut Virrat	Kutonen	*	
FC Voltti	Karkku, Sastamala	Tampere	FC Voltti-96	Kutonen	*	
FC W	Espoo	Uusimaa	FC W	Kutonen	*	
FC Wartti/WB	Helsinki	Helsinki	FC Wartti / WB	Seiska	*	
FC Wasa	Vaasa	Vaasa	Football Club Wasa	Kutonen	*	
FC WILD	Veikkola, Kirkkonummi	Uusimaa	FC WILD	Kutonen	*	
FC YPA	Ylivieska	Keski-Pohjanmaa	Jalkapalloseura FC YPA	Kakkonen	* * *	
FC YPA II	Ylivieska	Keski-Pohjanmaa	Jalkapalloseura FC YPA / II	Nelonen	* *	
FC YPA III	Ylivieska	Keski-Pohjanmaa	Jalkapalloseura FC YPAA / III	Vitonen	*	
FC-88	Kemi	Pohjois-Suomi	FC-88 Kemi	Kolmonen	*	
FCD	Kerava	Uusimaa	FC Keravan Dynamo	Nelonen	* *	
FCJ	Jyväskylä	Keski-Suomi	FC Jyväskylä Blackbird	Kolmonen	* * *	
FCK	Jyväskylä	Keski-Suomi	Fotball Club Kurd	Vitonen	* *	
FCV Reds	Vaajakoski	Keski-Suomi	FC Vaajakoski / Reds	Vitonen	*	
FF Jaro	Jakobstad	Keski-Pohjanmaa	Fotbollsföreningen Jaro	Veikkausliiga	* * *	
FF Kickers	Bennäs	Keski-Pohjanmaa	Fotbollsföreningen Kickers	Kutonen	* *	
FFR	Helsinki	Helsinki	FFR (Fotbollsföreningen Rugbyplanspojkarna)	Vitonen	*	
FFR/Väiski	Helsinki	Helsinki	FFR (Fotbollsföreningen Rugbyplanspojkarna) / Väiski	Kutonen	*	
FJK	Forssa	Tampere	Forssan Jalkapalloklubi	Nelonen	* *	
FoBK	Forsby, Pedersöre	Keski-Pohjanmaa	Forsby Bollklubb	Kutonen	* *	
FP JKL (U.S.Skädäm)	Jyväskylä	Keski-Suomi	U.S. Skädäm / FP JKL	Vitonen	*	
Friska Viljor	Kokkola	Keski-Pohjanmaa	Friska Viljor	Kutonen	*	
FunctioL	Turku	Turku	Functio Laesa	Kutonen	*	
Futura 2	Porvoo	Uusimaa	FC Futura / 2	Kutonen	*	
Futura A	Porvoo	Uusimaa	FC Futura / A	Kutonen	*	
