= SPL Uudenmaan piiri =

District organisation of the Football Association of Finland

Suomen Palloliiton Uusimaan piiri
- Abbreviation: SPL Uusimaa
- Purpose: District Football Association
- Location(s): Osmankäämintie 5 01300 Vantaa Finland
- Director: Matti Räisänen
- Website: uusimaa.palloliitto.fi

The SPL Uusimaan piiri (Uusimaa Football Association) was one of the 12 district organisations of the Football Association of Finland. It administered lower tier football in Vantaa.

== Background ==
Suomen Palloliitto Uusimaan piiri, commonly referred to as SPL Uusimaan piiri or SPL Uusimaa, is the governing body for football in Vantaa. Based in the city of Vantaa, the Association's Director is Matti Räisänen.

== Member clubs ==
Abbreviation	Settlement	Official Name	Division	Cup	Other information
AC JazzPa	Järvenpää	AC JazzPa	Kutonen	*	
AC Vantaa	Vantaa	Jalkapalloseura Airport City	Kakkonen	* * *	
AC Vantaa 2	Vantaa	Jalkapalloseura Airport City / 2	Vitonen	* *	
Akilles	Porvoo	Porvoon Akilles	Vitonen	*	
Allianssi	Vantaa	Allianssi Vantaa	Nelonen	*	
AP	Espoo	Aika-pallo	Kutonen	*	
Apollo	Hyvinkää	Palloiluseura Apollo	Kutonen	* * *	
Ares-86	Hyvinkää	Hyvinkään Ares -86	Kutonen	*	
AskU	Askola	Askolan Urheilijat	Kutonen	*	
BK-46	Karis, Raseborg	Bollklubben-46	Kakkonen	* * *	
BK-46 Nk02	Karis, Raseborg	Bollklubben-46 / Nk02	Vitonen	*	
Buster	Espoo	Football Club Buster	Kutonen	*	
City Stars	Lahti	FC Kuusysi / City Stars	Kakkonen	* * *	
Derius	Jokela, Tuusula	Derius	Kutonen	*	
DT-65	Vantaa	Downtown 65	Kutonen	*	
EBK	Espoo	Esbo Bollklubb	Kolmonen	* *	
EBK 2	Espoo	Esbo Bollklubb / 2	Nelonen	*	
Ehawks	Espoo	Espoo Hawks	Vitonen	*	
EIF	Ekenäs, Raseborg	Ekenäs Idrottsförening	Kolmonen	* * *	
EIF Akademi	Ekenäs, Raseborg	Ekenäs Idrottsförening / Akademi	Kolmonen	* *	
EPS	Espoo	Espoon Palloseuran Jalkapallo	Nelonen	* *	
EPS 2	Espoo	Espoon Palloseuran Jalkapallo / 2	Vitonen	*	
EPS RPS	Espoo	Espoon Palloseuran Jalkapallo / RPS	Kutonen	*	
EsPa	Espoo	Etelä-Espoon Pallo	Kakkonen	* *	
F.C.B	Espoo	F.C. Bärcelona	Kutonen	* *	
FC Babylon X	Espoo	Football Club Babylon / X	Vitonen	* *	
FC Babylon Z	Espoo	FC Babylon / Z	Kutonen	*	
FC Espoo	Espoo	FC Espoo	Kakkonen	* * *	
FC Espoo Akatemia	Espoo	FC Espoo / Akatemia	Kolmonen	* *	
FC G.A.B	Espoo	FC Grani Airbags	Kutonen	* *	
FC HIK	Hanko	FC Hangö Idrottsklubb	Kolmonen	*	
FC Honka	Espoo	FC Honka	Veikkausliiga	* * *	
FC Insiders	Nurmijärvi	FC Insiders	Vitonen	*	
FC Insiders Sekunda Utd	Nurmijärvi	FC Insiders / Sekunda Utd	Kutonen	*	
FC Karzinkarjut	Espoo	FC Karzinkarjut	Kutonen	*	
FC Korso United	Korso, Vantaa	FC Korso United	Kutonen	* *	
FC Kyllikki	Espoo	FC Kyllikki	Kutonen	* *	
FC Lahti	Lahti	FC Lahti	Veikkausliiga	* * *	
FC Linnunpojat	Espoo	FC Linnunpojat	Kutonen	*	
FC Lohja	Lohja	FC Lohja	Vitonen	* *	
FC Loviisa	Loviisa	FC Loviisa	Vitonen	* *	
FC RaHi	Nummi, Lohja	FC Raskas Hiki	Vitonen	*	
FC Samba	Espoo	Football Club Samba	Vitonen	*	
FC Tuusula	Tuusula	FC Tuusula	Vitonen	*	
FC Vantaa	Vantaa	Football Club Vantaa	Vitonen	* *	
FC Västnyland	Ekenäs, Raseborg	FC Västnyland	Nelonen	* *	
FC Västnyland 2	Ekenäs, Raseborg	FC Västnyland /2	Kutonen	*	
FC W	Espoo	FC W	Kutonen	*	
FC WILD	Veikkola, Kirkkonummi	FC WILD	Kutonen	*	
FCD	Kerava	FC Keravan Dynamo	Nelonen	* *	
Futura	Porvoo	FC Futura	Kakkonen	* * *	
Futura 2	Porvoo	FC Futura / 2	Kutonen	*	
Futura A	Porvoo	FC Futura / A	Kutonen	*	
GrIFK	Kauniainen	Grankulla Idrottsförening Kamraterna	Kakkonen	* * *	
GrIFK 2	Kauniainen	Grankulla Idrottsförening Kamraterna / 2	Kutonen	*	
HaNa	Oitti, Hausjärvi	Hausjärven Nappulat	Kutonen	*	
HaRi Legends	Hakunila, Vantaa	Hakunilan Riento / Legends	Kutonen	*	
HC Ränni	Espoo	Herraclubi Ränni	Vitonen	* *	
HC Skavaböle	Tuusula	Keski-Uudenmaan Pallo / HC Skavaböle	Vitonen	*	
HC-MD	Espoo	HC Manalan Dynamo	Kutonen	*	
Honka 3	Espoo	Football Club Honka / 3	Nelonen	*	
Honka Viitonen	Espoo	Football Club Honka / Viitonen	Kutonen	*	
HooGee	Haukilahti, Espoo	Haukilahden Pallo-Gäddviks Boll	Vitonen	* *	
HooGee 1	Haukilahti, Espoo	Haukilahden Pallo-Gäddviks Boll / 1	Vitonen	*	
HooGee 2	Haukilahti, Espoo	Haukilahden Pallo-Gäddviks Boll / 1	Kutonen	*	
HooGee 4	Haukilahti, Espoo	Haukilahden Pallo-Gäddviks Boll / 4	Vitonen	*	
Hukat	Nummi, Lohja	Nummen Hukat	Kutonen	*	
HUS 1	Hyvinkää	Hyvinkään Urheiluseura / 1	Kutonen	*	
HUS 2	Hyvinkää	Hyvinkään Urheiluseura / 2	Kutonen	*	
HyPS	Hyvinkää	Hyvinkään Palloseura	Kolmonen	* * *	
HyPS 02	Hyvinkää	Hyvinkään Palloseura / 02	Nelonen	*	
HäPS	Hämeenkylä, Vantaa	Hämeenkylän Palloseura	Kutonen	*	
I-HK M09	Itä-Hakkila, Vantaa	Itä-Hakkilan Kilpa / M09	Kutonen	* *	
IVPA	Vantaa	Itä-Vantaan Pallo	Kutonen	* *	
IVU	Vantaa	Itä-Vantaan Urheilijat	Vitonen	*	
IVU Skoobarit	Vantaa	Itä-Vantaan Urheilijat / Skoobarit	Kutonen	*	
JoKi	Jokela, Tuusula	Jokelan Kisa	Nelonen	* *	
Jäppärä	Järvelä, Kärkölä	Järvelän Jäppärä	Kutonen	*	
JäPS	Järvenpää	Järvenpään Palloseura	Kakkonen	* * *	
JäPS M2	Järvenpää	Järvenpään Palloseura / M2	Vitonen	* *	
JäPS 3	Järvenpää	Järvenpään Palloseura / 3	Kutonen	*	
KAKE	Tapiola, Espoo	Kaupinkallion Keila	Kutonen	*	
KaPy	Espoo	Kauklahden V- Ja U-seura Pyrintö	Kutonen	*	
Karjalohjan Biisonit	Karjalohja, Lohja	Karjalohjan Biisonit	Nelonen	* *	
KarlU	Karjalohja, Lohja	Karjalohjan Urheilijat	Kutonen	*	
Kasiysi Miehet	Espoo	FC Kasiysi Espoo / Miehet	Vitonen	* *	
Kasiysi Rocky	Espoo	FC Kasiysi Espoo / Rocky	Nelonen	* *	
KasvU	Kauniainen	Kasavuoren Urheilijat	Kutonen	*	
KelA	Kellokoski, Tuusula	Kellokosken Alku	Vitonen	*	
KesPa	Vantaa	Keskon Pallo	Kutonen	*	
Kilo IF 1	Espoo	Kilo Idrottsförening / 1	Kutonen	*	
Kilo IF 2	Espoo	Kilo Idrottsförening / 2	Kutonen	*	
Kilo IF 3	Espoo	Kilo Idrottsförening / 3	Vitonen	*	
Kilo IF 4	Espoo	Kilo Idrottsförening / 4	Kutonen	*	
Kilo IF 5	Espoo	Kilo Idrottsförening / 5	Kutonen	*	
Kiksi	Olari, Espoo	Olarin Kiksi	Vitonen	* *	Another abbreviation is OK.
KoiPS	Koivukylä, Vantaa	Koivukylän Palloseura	Vitonen	* *	
KoiPS A	Koivukylä, Vantaa	Koivukylän Palloseura / A	Kutonen	*	
KoiPS Harraste	Koivukylä, Vantaa	Koivukylän Palloseura / Harraste	Kutonen	*	
KoPa	Vantaa	Korson Palloilijat	Kutonen	*	
KOPSE	Vantaa	Korson Palloseura	Kolmonen	* *	
KOPSE 2	Korso, Vantaa	Korson Palloseura / 2	Vitonen	*	
KOPSE 3	Vantaa	Korson Palloseura / 3	Kutonen	*	
KP-75 / Sapo	Kerava	Keravan Pallo -75 / Sapo	Vitonen	*	
KP-75 2	Kerava	Keravan Pallo -75 / 2	Kutonen	*	
KP-75/Kyytipojat	Kerava	Keravan Pallo -75 / Kyytipojat	Vitonen	*	
KyIF FCK 1	Kirkkonummi	Kyrkslätt Idrottsförening / FC Kirkkonummi 1	Kolmonen	* *	
KyIF/FCK 2	Kirkkonummi	Kyrkslätt Idrottsförening / FC Kirkkonummi 2	Vitonen	*	
Lahen Pojat JS	Lahti	Lahen Pojat Jalkapalloseura	Vitonen	* *	
LePa	Leppävaara, Espoo	Leppävaaran Pallo	Vitonen	*	
LePa 2	Leppävaara, Espoo	Leppävaaran Pallo / 2	Kutonen	*	
LoPa	Lohja	Lohjan Pallo	Kakkonen	* * *	
MasKi	Masala, Kirkkonummi	Masalan Kisa	Kolmonen	* *	
MasKi 2	Masala, Kirkkonummi	Masalan Kisa / 2	Kutonen	*	
MU	Mäntsälä	Mäntsälän Urheilijat	Vitonen	*	
MyMy	Myrskylä	Myrskylän Myrsky	Kutonen	* *	
Naseva	Nastola, Lahti	Nastolan Naseva	Vitonen	* *	
NJS	Nurmijärvi	Nurmijärven Jalkapalloseura	Kolmonen	* *	
NJS 2	Klaukkala, Nurmijärvi	Nurmijärven Jalkapalloseura / 2	Vitonen	* *	
Nopsa	Nastola, Lahti	Nastolan Nopsa	Kolmonen	* *	
NouLa	Järvenpää	Nouseva Laaka	Kolmonen	* *	
NouLa AiVa	Järvenpää	Nouseva Laaka / AiVa	Kutonen	*	
NouLa Huilii	Järvenpää	Nouseva Laaka / Huilii	Kutonen	*	
NuPS	Nummela, Vihti	Nummelan Palloseura	Kolmonen	* *	
NuPS Reservi	Nummela, Vihti	Nummelan Palloseura / Reservi	Nelonen	*	
OK	Olari, Espoo	Olarin Kiksi	Vitonen	* *	Another abbreviation is Kiksi.
OPedot	Orimattila	Orimattilan Pedot	Nelonen	* *	
OPedot 2	Orimattila	Orimattilan Pedot / 2	Kutonen	*	
Orient U	Vantaa	Orient United	Vitonen	* *	
OT-77 2	Olari, Espoo	Olarin Tarmo -77 / 2	Vitonen	*	
OT-77 Aarni United	Olari, Espoo	Olarin Tarmo -77 / Aarni United	Kutonen	*	
OT-77 FC Puhallin	Espoo	Olarin Tarmo -77 / FC Puhallin	Vitonen	*	
Pallohonka	Espoo	Pallohonka Juniorit	Kakkonen	* * *	
PEF	Espoo	FC Pelifiilis	Vitonen	*	
Pelikaani	Hyvinkää	Urheiluseura Hyvinkään Pelikaani	Kutonen	*	
PK-35	Vantaa	Pallokerho-35	Ykkönen	* * *	
PK Keski-Uusimaa	Kerava	Pallokerho Keski-Uusimaa	Kakkonen	* * *	
Pöxyt	Espoo	SexyPöxyt	Kolmonen	* *	
PuM	Espoo	Punainen Mylly	Vitonen	*	
PuPo	Vantaa	PuPo FC Vantaa	Kutonen	*	
RePa-93	Rekola, Vantaa	Rekolan Pallo -93	Vitonen	*	
RIlves	Riihimäki	Riihimäen Ilves	No record	* *	
RIlves 2	Riihimäki	Riihimäen Ilves / 2	No record	*	
RiPS	Riihimäki	Riihimäen Palloseura	Kolmonen	* *	Reformed in 2011 taking the place of RIlves.
RiRa	Vantaa	Riipilän Raketti	Kolmonen	* *	
RiRa Ug	Riipilä, Vantaa	Riipilän Raketti / Ug	Kutonen	* *	RiRa/2
RiRa Ug 09	Riipilä, Vantaa	Riipilän Raketti / Ug 09	Kutonen	*	
RiSa	Riihimäki	Riihimäen Sarvet	Vitonen	*	
RT-88	Ruskeasanta, Vantaa	Ruskeasannan Tykitys -88	Kutonen	* *	
SalReipas	Lahti	Salpausselän Reipas	Kolmonen	* *	
SalReipas Akatemia	Lahti	Salpausselän Reipas / Akatemia	Vitonen	* *	
SibboV	Sipoo	IF Sibbo-Vargarna	Kolmonen	* *	
SibboV 2	Sipoo	IF Sibbo-Vargarna / 2	Vitonen	* *	
Stars	Lahti	Jalkapalloseura Stars	Kolmonen	* *	
Team Vanpa	Vantaa	Team Vanpa	Vitonen	*	
TGrani	Kauniainen	Team Grani	Nelonen	*	
Tikka	Espoo	Espoon Tikka	Vitonen	* *	
Tikka -88	Espoo	Espoon Tikka / -88	Kutonen	*	
TiPS	Tikkurila, Vantaa	Tikkurilan Palloseura	Kolmonen	* *	
TiPS M2	Tikkurila, Vantaa	Tikkurilan Palloseura / M2	Kutonen	*	
Träfk	Järvenpää	Träskända Fotboll Klub	Kutonen	*	
TuPS	Tuusula	Tuusulan Palloseura	Kolmonen	* *	
TuPS 2	Tuusula	Tuusulan Palloseura / 2	Kutonen	*	
VAP	Vantaa	Vantaan Palloseura VAP -09	Kutonen	*	
VeVe	Veikkola, Kirkkonummi	Veikkolan Veikot	Vitonen	*	
ViTa	Virkkala, Lohja	Virkkalan Tarmo	Vitonen	*	
VJS	Vantaa	Vantaan Jalkapalloseura	Nelonen	* *	

== League Competitions ==
SPL Uusimaan piiri run the following league competitions:

=== Men's Football ===
- Division 3 - Kolmonen - two sections
- Division 4 - Nelonen - two sections
- Division 5 - Vitonen - four sections
- Division 6 - Kutonen - seven sections

=== Ladies Football ===
- Division 3 - Kolmonen - one section
