= SPL Vaasan piiri =

District organisation of the Football Association of Finland

Suomen Palloliiton Vaasan piiri
- Abbreviation: SPL Vaasa
- Purpose: District Football Association
- Location(s): Kauppapuistikko 10 C 13 65100 Vaasa Finland
- Chairman: Stig Nygård
- Website: vaasa.palloliitto.fi

The SPL Vaasan piiri (Vaasa Football Association) was one of the 12 district organisations of the Football Association of Finland. It administered lower tier football in Vaasa.

== Background ==
Suomen Palloliitto Vaasan piiri, commonly referred to as SPL Vaasan piiri or SPL Vaasa, is the governing body for football in Vaasa. The Association's Chairman is Stig Nygård.

== Member clubs ==
Abbreviation	Settlement	Official name	Division	Cup	Other information
ABC	Vaasa	Akademisk Boll Club	Vitonen	*	
ABC Oldboys	Vaasa	Akademisk Boll Club / Oldboys	Vitonen	*	
APV	Alavus	Alavuden Peli-Veikot	Kutonen	* *	
BK-48	Vaasa	Bollklubben-48rf	Kutonen	* *	
Black Islanders	Korsholm	Black Islanders	Kutonen	* *	
FC Brändöpojkarna	Vaasa	FC Brändöpojkarna	Vitonen	*	
FC Jukola	Vaasa	FC Jukolan Pallo	Kutonen	*	
FC Kiisto	Vaasa	Vaasan Kiisto	Kakkonen	* * *	
FC Kiisto a-team	Vaasa	FC Kiisto / a-team	Kolmonen	*	
FC KOMU	Korsholm	FC KOMU (FC Korsholm Mustasaari)	Kolmonen	* *	
FC Korsholm	Korsholm	FC Korsholm	Kolmonen	* * *	
FC Korsholm /3	Korsholm	FC Korsholm /3	Kutonen	*	
FC Korsholm Young Boys	Korsholm	FC Korsholm / Young Boys	Vitonen	* *	FC Korsholm /2
FC Kuffen	Kvevlax, Korsholm	FC Kuffen	Nelonen	*	
FC Kuffen/2	Kvevlax, Korsholm	FC Kuffen / 2	Vitonen	*	
FC Sport	Vaasa	FC Sport-39	Kutonen	*	
FC Wasa	Vaasa	Football Club Wasa	Kutonen	*	
IK	Ilmajoki	Ilmajoen Kisailijat	Nelonen	* *	
Jalas	Jalasjärvi, Kurikka	Jalasjärven Jalas	Kutonen	*	
Jurva-70	Jurva, Kurikka	Jurva-70	Kutonen	* *	
KaIK/TePa	Kaskinen / Teuva	Kaskö Idrottsklubb / Teuvan Pallo	Nelonen	* *	
KaNsU	Kallträsk, Kristinestad	Kallträskin Nuorisoseuran Urheilijat	Kutonen	*	
Karhu	Kauhajoki	Kauhajoen Karhu	Kolmonen	* *	
Karhu /3	Kauhajoki	Kauhajoen Karhu / 3	Kutonen	*	
Karhu Young Boys	Kauhajoki	Kauhajoen Karhu / Young Boys	Vitonen	*	
KieHa	Ähtäri	Ähtärin Kiekko-Haukat	Kutonen	*	
KJV /Kanu	Kortesjärvi, Kauhava	Kortesjärven Järvi-Veikot / Kanu	Vitonen	* *	
KoFF/PeIK	Korsnäs / Petalax, Malax	Korsnäs Fotbollsförening / Petalax Idrottsklubb	Nelonen	*	
KoFF-PeIK/2	Kaskinen / Teuva	Kaskö Idrottsklubb / Teuvan Pallo / 2	Kutonen	*	
Kraft	Närpes	Närpes Kraft Fotbollsförening	Kakkonen	* *	
Kraft/2	Närpes	Närpes Kraft Fotbollsförening / 2	Vitonen	*	
Kungliga Wasa CF	Vaasa	Kungliga Wasa CF	Nelonen	* *	
KuRy	Kurikka	Kurikan Ryhti	Kutonen	* *	
LeJy	Lehtimäki, Alajärvi	Lehtimäen Jyske	Kutonen	* *	
Luja	Laihia	Laihian Luja	Vitonen	* *	
Malax IF	Malax	Malax Idrottsförening	Vitonen	* *	Tier 3 (1 season): 1999
Malax IF /2	Malax	Malax Idrottsförening / 2	Kutonen	*	
Norrvalla FF	Vörå	Norrvalla Fotbollsförening	Kolmonen	* *	
Norrvalla FF /2	Vörå	Norrvalla Fotbollsförening / 2	Kutonen	*	
NuPa	Nurmo, Seinäjoki	Nurmon Pallo	Nelonen	* *	
NuPa /HyMy	Nurmo / Hyllykallio, Seinäjoki	Nurmon Pallo / Hyllykallion Myrsky	Kutonen	*	
Ponnistus	Lapua	Lapuan Ponnistus	Nelonen	*	
Ponnistus/2	Lapua	Lapuan Ponnistus / 2	Kutonen	*	
Ruutupaidat	Sundom, Vaasa	Ruutupaidat	Kutonen	*	
Sepsi-78	Seinäjoki	Sepsi-78	Kutonen	*	
SIF	Sundom, Vaasa	Sundom Idrottsförening	Kolmonen	*	
SIF/2	Sundom, Vaasa	Sundom Idrottsförening	Nelonen	*	
SIK	Solf, Korsholm	Solf IK	Vitonen	*	
Sisu	Seinäjoki	Seinäjoen Sisu	Vitonen	* *	
SJK	Seinäjoki	Seinäjoen Jalkapallokerho	Ykkönen	* * *	
SJK/2	Seinäjoki	Seinäjoen Jalkapallokerho /2	Kolmonen	*	
SoPS	Soini	Soinin Palloseura	Kutonen	*	
Sporting	Kristinestad	Sporting Kristina	Kakkonen	*	
Sporting /2	Kristinestad	Sporting Kristina	Kutonen	*	
SuSi YB	Vaasa	Suvilahden Sisu / Young Boys	Nelonen	*	
SuSi/2	Vaasa	Suvilahden Sisu / 2	Vitonen	*	
TeTe	Vaasa	Tervalaakson Teräs	Vitonen	* *	
TP-Seinäjoki	Seinäjoki	TP-Seinäjoki (Törnävän Pallo)	Nelonen	*	
Töjby FC	Töjby, Närpes	Töjby FC	Vitonen	*	
VIFK	Vaasa	Idrottsföreningen Kamraterna Vasa	Kakkonen	* * *	
VIFK Motion	Vaasa	Idrottsföreningen Kamraterna Vasa / Motion	Kutonen	*	
VIFK U	Vaasa	Idrottsföreningen Kamraterna Vasa Utveckling	Nelonen	*	
Virkiä	Lapua	Lapuan Virkiä	Kolmonen	* *	
Virkiä/2	Lapua	Lapuan Virkiä / 2	Kutonen	* *	
VPS	Vaasa	Vaasan Palloseura	Veikkausliiga	* * *	
VPS-j	Vaasa	Vaasan Palloseuran Juniorit	Nelonen	* *	
VäVi	Vähäkyrö, Vaasa	Vähänkyrön Viesti	Vitonen	* *	
VäVi/2	Vähäkyrö, Vaasa	Vähänkyrön Viesti / 2	Kutonen	*	

== League Competitions ==
SPL Vaasan piiri run the following league competitions:

=== Men's Football ===
- Division 3 - Kolmonen - one section
- Division 4 - Nelonen - one section
- Division 5 - Vitonen - one section
- Division 6 - Kutonen - three sections

=== Ladies Football ===
- Division 3 - Kolmonen - one section
