= Nykänen =

Nykänen is a Finnish surname. Notable people with the surname include:

- Antti Nykänen (born 1983), Finnish basketball player
- Harri Nykänen (1953–2023), Finnish crime writer
- Juho Nykänen (born 1985), Finnish footballer
- Matti Nykänen (1963–2019), Finnish ski jumper
- Taneli Nykänen (1845–1927), Finnish farmer and politician
- Valfrid Nykänen (1894–1918), Finnish World War I fighter pilot
