= Tommi Laitila =

Finnish football coach (born 1979)

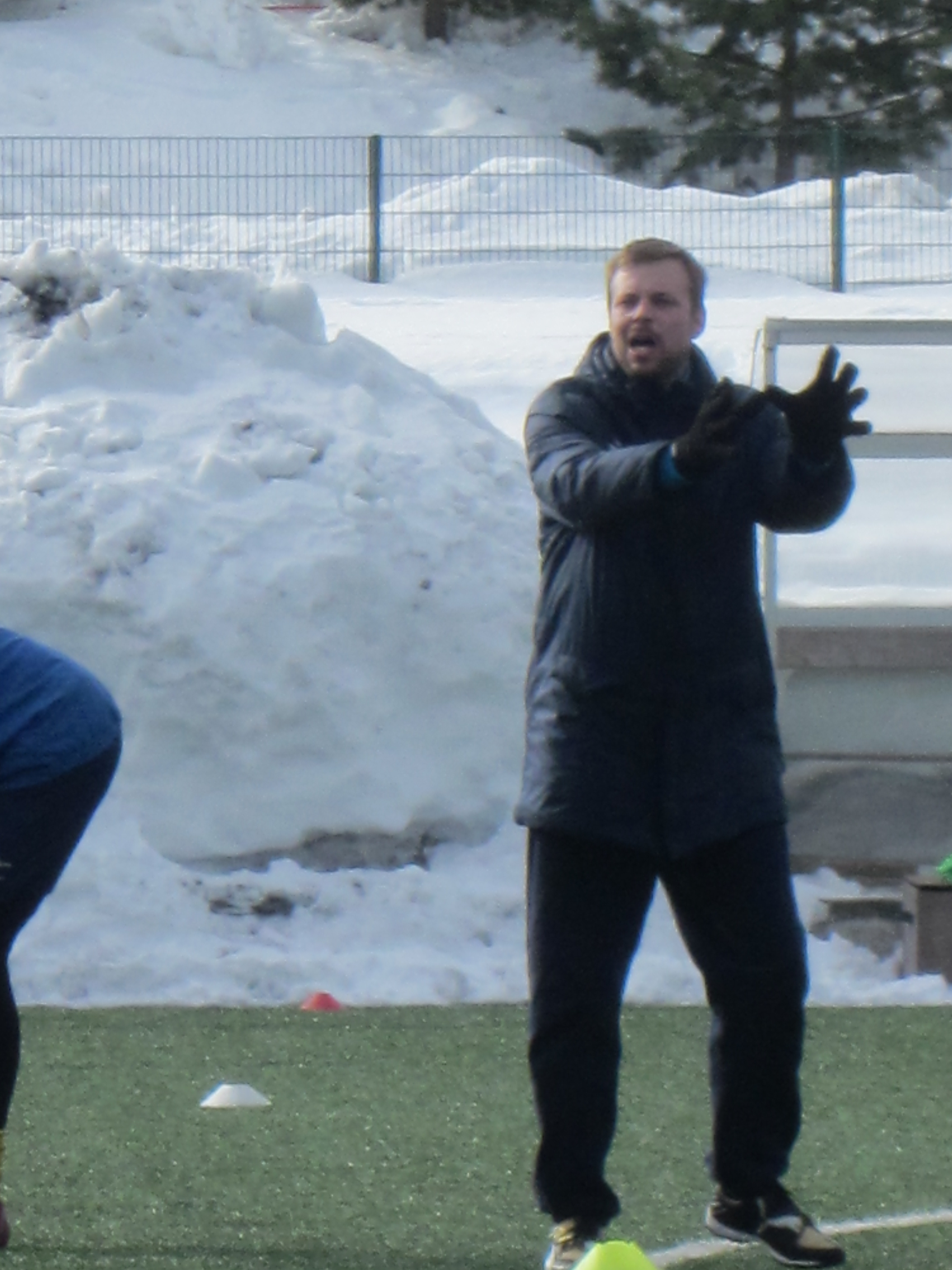
- Laitila in 2013

Personal information
- Date of birth: 9 March 1979 (age 47)
- Place of birth: Tuusula, Finland
- Position: Goalkeeper

Youth career
- TuPS
- HJK

Senior career*
Years	Team	Apps	(Gls)
- KäPa
- FinnPa
- Jokerit

Managerial career
- 2007: Gnistan (assistant)
- 2008–2009: Gnistan
- 2013–2018: Espoo (coaching director)
- 2013–2024: Finland women (gk coach)
- 2018–2024: HJS (executive manager)
- 2024–: Lahti (executive manager)
- * Club domestic league appearances and goals as of 17 October 2024

Tommi Laitila (born 9 March 1979) is a Finnish football coach and a former player, currently working as the executive manager of FC Lahti.

== Playing career ==
Laitila started playing football in the youth sector of his hometown club Tuusulan Palloseura (TuPS). Later he has played as a goalkeeper in a youth team of HJK Helsinki, and in the first team of Veikkausliiga club Jokerit. He was also a Finnish youth international. Laitila ended his playing career in 2004 due to injuries.

== Career ==
Laitila was an assistant coach of IF Gnistan in 2007. During 2008–2009, he was the club's first team head coach.

During 2004–2013, Laitila worked as a coaching director of the Uusimaa district of the Finnish FA. In August 2013, he was named the coaching director of FC Espoo.

Since 2013, he has also been serving as a goalkeeping coach of the Finland women's national football team. He left the team after 2024.

Between August 2018 and October 2024, Laitila worked as an executive manager of Hämeenlinnan Jalkapalloseura (HJS).

On 17 September 2024, Laitila was named the executive manager of FC Lahti, starting in the position on 1 November, mainly focusing on the youth sector and the unification of the associate clubs Kuusysi and Reipas.

== Personal life ==
Laitila is of White Karelian descent from Jyskyjärvi and Rukajärvi from his mother's side.
