= Jokelan Kisa =

Finnish sports club

- Full name: Jokelan Kisa
- Nickname(s): JoKi
- Founded: 1931
- Ground: Jokelan kenttä, Jokela, Finland
- League: Nelonen
| Home colours | Away colours |

Jokelan Kisa (abbreviated JoKi) is a sports club from Jokela, Finland. The club was formed in 1931 and in its early years specialised in athletics, gymnastics and skiing followed later by boxing, weight lifting and pesäpallo. Today the club has 4 sections covering skiing, football, volleyball and badminton. The men's football team currently plays in the Nelonen (Fourth Division) and their home ground is at the Jokelan kenttä. In total JoKi has around 450 members.

== Background ==
JoKi's men's team has competed in the lower divisions of the Finnish football league. They have had mixed results in the last decade and they did not participate in the 2008 season. However, a year later in 2009 they closely missed out on promotion to the Vitonen (Fifth Division) finishing only 1 point behind FC Loviisa and Lahen Pojat JS. On 3 June 2010 the team recorded their biggest ever win with a 30–0 away victory over Hyvinkään Urheiluseura 1.

The club currently has 12 football teams comprising 1 men's team, 1 ladies team, 5 boys teams, 3 girls' teams and 2 mixed teams. In total there are around 250 players supported by 50 active parents. Football has become a very visible and popular hobby in Jokela. This is reflected by the increasing number of players, which grew by 20% in the Spring 2009. Teams play in leagues run by the SPL Uusimaa district and in the winter months the club now run a number of futsal teams. The club uses pitches at Jokelan kenttä and Puhos Areena.

== Season to season ==
| Season | Level | Division | Section | Administration | Position | Movements |
|---|---|---|---|---|---|---|
| 2001 | Tier 7 | Kutonen (Sixth Division) | Section 6 | Uusimaa District (SPL Uusimaa) | 8th | |
| 2002 | Tier 7 | Kutonen (Sixth Division) | Section 6 | Uusimaa District (SPL Uusimaa) | 5th | |
| 2003 | Tier 7 | Kutonen (Sixth Division) | Section 7 | Uusimaa District (SPL Uusimaa) | 5th | |
| 2004 | Tier 7 | Kutonen (Sixth Division) | Section 7 | Uusimaa District (SPL Uusimaa) | 8th | JoKi Suired |
| 2005 | Tier 7 | Kutonen (Sixth Division) | Section 7 | Uusimaa District (SPL Uusimaa) | 9th | JoKi Suired |
| 2006 | Tier 7 | Kutonen (Sixth Division) | Section 7 | Uusimaa District (SPL Uusimaa) | Withdrew | JoKi Derius |
| 2007 | Tier 7 | Kutonen (Sixth Division) | Section 6 | Uusimaa District (SPL Uusimaa) | 9th | JoKi Derius |
| 2008 | | No team entered | | | | |
| 2009 | Tier 7 | Kutonen (Sixth Division) | Section 7 | Uusimaa District (SPL Uusimaa) | 3rd | |
| 2010 | Tier 7 | Kutonen (Sixth Division) | Section 7 | Uusimaa District (SPL Uusimaa) | 1st | Promoted |
| 2011 | Tier 6 | Vitonen (Fifth Division) | Section 4 | Uusimaa District (SPL Uusimaa) | 1st | Promoted |
| 2012 | Tier 5 | Nelonen (Fourth Division) | Section 2 | Uusimaa District (SPL Uusimaa) | 3rd | |
| 2013 | Tier 5 | Nelonen (Fourth Division) | Section 2 | Uusimaa District (SPL Uusimaa) | 3rd | |
| 2014 | Tier 5 | Nelonen (Fourth Division) | Section 2 | Uusimaa District (SPL Uusimaa) | 3rd | |

== References and sources ==
- Official Website
- Finnish Wikipedia
