= FCJ =

FCJ may refer to:

- Faithful Companions of Jesus
- FC Jyväskylä Blackbird, a Finnish football club
- Formula Challenge Japan, a Japanese racing series
