= Valfrid =

Valfrid is a Finnish given name. Notable people with the name include:

- Valfrid Nykänen (1894–1918), Finnish World War I fighter pilot
- Valfrid Palmgren (1877–1967), Swedish library reformer, linguist, and politician
- Valfrid Perttilä (1878–1953), Finnish politician and trade unionist
