= Pyry Lampinen =

Finnish footballer (born 2002)

Personal information
- Date of birth: 7 March 2002 (age 24)
- Place of birth: Lahti, Finland
- Position: Forward

Team information
- Current team: FCJ Blackbird

Youth career
- Kuusysi
- Reipas Lahti

Senior career*
Years	Team	Apps	(Gls)
2019–2022	Reipas Lahti	13	(5)
2019–2022	Lahti	51	(7)
2023–2024	KuPS	18	(1)
2024	→ KuPS II	1	(0)
2025–	FCJ Blackbird	0	(0)

International career^{‡}
2018	Finland U17	6	(1)
2019	Finland U18	1	(0)
- * Club domestic league appearances and goals as of 19 May 2024 ‡ National team caps and goals as of 17 November 2019

Pyry Lampinen (born 7 March 2002) is a Finnish professional footballer who plays as a forward for FCJ Blackbird in Kolmonen.

== Club career ==
On 28 November 2022, Lampinen signed a two-year contract with KuPS, with an option for a third year. His contract was terminated on mutual agreement on 10 July 2024.
