= Kellokosken Alku =

Finnish sports club

- Full name: Kellokosken Alku
- Nickname(s): KelA
- Founded: 1926
- Ground: Kellokosken nurmi, Kellokoski, Finland
- Chairman: Kyösti Lehtonen
- Coach: Harri Ronimus; Kari Ristola
- League: Vitonen
Home colours

Kellokosken Alku (abbreviated KelA) is a sports club from Kellokoski, Finland. The club was formed in 1926 as Woimistelu and Urheiluseura Alku. It has specialised in athletics, skiing, gymnastics, wrestling, boxing, pesäpallo, cycling, football, volleyball, basketball, bandy, table tennis, swimming, orienteering, weight lifting, ice hockey, and floorball. Football and ice hockey are the two most popular sports. The men's football team currently plays in the Vitonen (Fifth Division) and their home ground is at the Kellokosken nurmi. The ice hockey team plays in the Second Division South, the fourth tier of Finnish ice-hockey. The Club chairman is Kyösti Lehtonen.

== Background ==
KelA has spent many seasons in the lower divisions of the Finnish football league with occasional spells in the fourth tier, the Kolmonen (Third Division).

The club is able to make use of the indoor facilities at the Fortum-halli in Järvenpää.

== Season to season ==
Season	Level	Division	Section	Administration	Position	Movements
1998	Tier 5	Nelonen (Fourth Division)	Section 4	Uusimaa District (SPL Uusimaa)	5th	
1999	Tier 5	Nelonen (Fourth Division)	Section 4	Uusimaa District (SPL Uusimaa)	4th	Promoted
2000	Tier 4	Kolmonen (Third Division)	Section 2	Helsinki & Uusimaa (SPL Uusimaa)	12th	Relegated
2001	Tier 5	Nelonen (Fourth Division)	Section 4	Uusimaa District (SPL Uusimaa)	7th	
2002	Tier 5	Nelonen (Fourth Division)	Section 2	Uusimaa District (SPL Uusimaa)	3rd	
2003	Tier 5	Nelonen (Fourth Division)	Section 2	Uusimaa District (SPL Uusimaa)	5th	
2004	Tier 5	Nelonen (Fourth Division)	Section 2	Uusimaa District (SPL Uusimaa)	8th	
2005	Tier 5	Nelonen (Fourth Division)	Section 2	Uusimaa District (SPL Uusimaa)	12th	Relegated
2006	Tier 6	Vitonen (Fifth Division)	Section 3	Uusimaa District (SPL Uusimaa)	8th	
2007	Tier 6	Vitonen (Fifth Division)	Section 4	Uusimaa District (SPL Uusimaa)	8th	
2008	Tier 6	Vitonen (Fifth Division)	Section 4	Uusimaa District (SPL Uusimaa)	6th	
2009	Tier 6	Vitonen (Fifth Division)	Section 4	Uusimaa District (SPL Uusimaa)	7th	
2010	Tier 6	Vitonen (Fifth Division)	Section 4	Uusimaa District (SPL Uusimaa)		

- 1 season in Kolmonen
- 7 seasons in Nelonen
- 5 seasons in Vitonen

== Club structure ==
Kellokosken Alku runs a number of teams including 1 men's team, 3 men's veterans teams, and 6 boys teams. The club also runs a football school for young boys and girls.

== 2010 season ==
KelA are competing in Section 4 (Lohko 4) of the Vitonen administered by the Uusimaa SPL. This is the senary highest tier in the Finnish football system. In 2009 KelA finished in 7th place in Section 4 of the Vitonen.

== References and sources ==
- Official Website
- Finnish Wikipedia
- Suomen Cup
- Kellokosken Alku Facebook
