= Ylihärmä =

- Former municipality
- Ylihärmän kunta Ylihärmä kommun
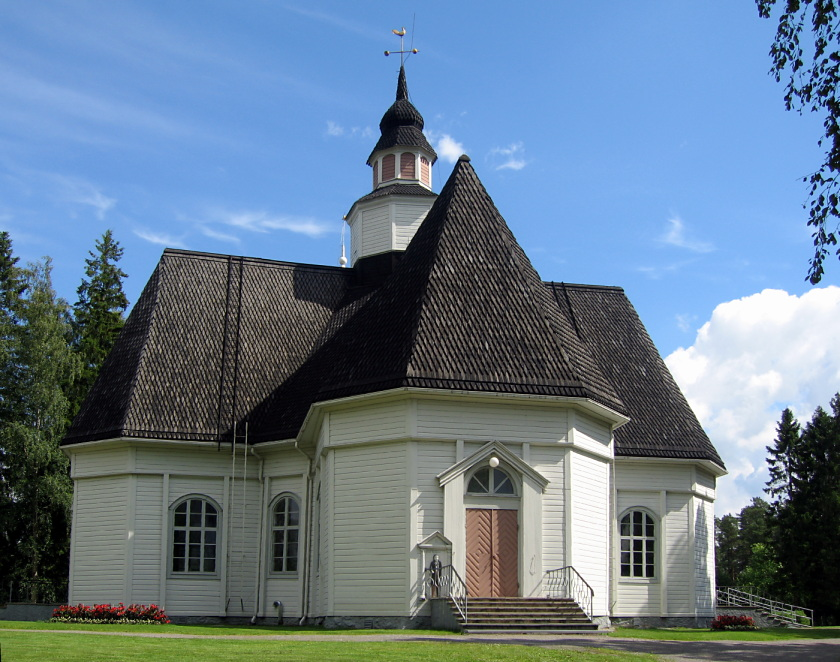
- Ylihärmä Church

- Coat of arms

- Location of Ylihärmä in Finland
- Interactive map of Ylihärmä
- Coordinates: 63°08.5′N 022°47.5′E
- Country: Finland
- Region: South Ostrobothnia
- Sub-region: Härmänmaa sub-region
- Founded: 1868
- Consolidated: 2009

Area
  - Total: 152.17 km^{2} (58.75 sq mi)
  - Land: 151.7 km^{2} (58.6 sq mi)
  - Water: 0.47 km^{2} (0.18 sq mi)

Population (2008-12-31)
  - Total: 2,916
  - Density: 19.22/km^{2} (49.79/sq mi)

Population by age
  - 0 to 14: 18.1%
  - 15 to 64: 59.8%
  - 65 or older: 22.1%
- Time zone: UTC+2 (EET)
  - Summer (DST): UTC+3 (EEST)

Ylihärmä is a former municipality of Finland. It was consolidated, together with Alahärmä and Kortesjärvi, to Kauhava on 1 January 2009.

It is located in the province of Western Finland and is part of the South Ostrobothnia region. The municipality had a population of 2,916 (as of 31 December 2008) and covered a land area of 151.70 square kilometres (58.57 sq mi). The population density was 19.22 inhabitants per square kilometre (49.8/sq mi).

The municipality was unilingually Finnish.
