= 2011 Nelonen – Finnish League Division 4 =

Finnish League Division 4
- Season: 2011
- Champions: Ponnistus; MPS/Atletico Malmi; EIF/Akademi; Nopsa; HP-47; JoPS /2; KuKi; U.S. Skädäm/FP JKL; OTP; FC Muurola; GBK II; SJK /2; TOVE; TP-T; JyTy

League tables for teams participating in Nelonen, the fifth tier in the Finnish Soccer League system, in 2011.

== League Tables 2011 ==
=== Helsinki ===
==== Section 1 ====
Pos	Team	Pld	W	D	L	GF	GA	GD	Pts	Promotion or relegation
1	Ponnistus	22	19	2	1	77	20	+57	59	Promoted
2	Vesa	22	14	4	4	66	32	+34	46	
3	FC Kiffen/2	22	11	4	7	72	52	+20	37	
4	KäPa/PuLe	22	10	5	7	53	43	+10	35	
5	Tavastia	22	9	5	8	40	42	−2	32	
6	LPS/kuninkaat	22	9	4	9	34	36	−2	31	
7	SAPA/2	22	8	5	9	47	35	+12	29	
8	MPS/Old Stars	22	7	6	9	52	54	−2	27	
9	HIFK/2	22	8	3	11	46	62	−16	27	
10	FC POHU/2	22	8	2	12	36	61	−25	26	Relegated
11	Arsenal	22	6	2	14	36	58	−22	20	Relegated
12	MaKu/Nelonen	22	1	2	19	19	83	−64	5	Relegated

==== Section 2 ====
Pos	Team	Pld	W	D	L	GF	GA	GD	Pts	Promotion or relegation
1	MPS/Atletico Malmi	22	20	2	0	93	24	+69	62	Promoted
2	MaKu/Baltika	22	16	5	1	82	35	+47	53	
3	Töölön Taisto	22	10	4	8	52	38	+14	34	
4	Gnistan/2	22	10	3	9	54	55	−1	33	
5	FC Kontu/2	22	9	5	8	38	38	0	32	
6	PPJ	22	8	4	10	43	44	−1	28	
7	SUMU	22	8	4	10	48	55	−7	28	
8	HPS/2	22	8	4	10	45	56	−11	28	
9	Herrasmiehet	22	8	4	10	39	50	−11	28	
10	MPS/2	22	8	3	11	43	51	−8	27	Relegated
11	Ellas	22	4	2	16	34	59	−25	14	Relegated
12	FC Pihlajisto/LEPRE	22	2	2	18	26	92	−66	8	Relegated

==== Play-Offs ====
Ponnistus (Lohko 1/I)   MPS/Atletico Malmi (Lohko 2/I)   4-1 (2-0)
Vesa (Lohko 1/II)   MaKu/Baltika (Lohko 2/II)            1-4 (0-2)

=== Uusimaa ===
==== Section 1 ====
Pos	Team	Pld	W	D	L	GF	GA	GD	Pts	Promotion or relegation
1	EIF/Akademi	22	17	2	3	110	20	+90	53	Promoted
2	EBK	22	16	3	3	112	36	+76	51	
3	NuPS/Reservi	22	11	4	7	44	50	−6	37	
4	KarlU/Biisonit	22	11	4	7	41	48	−7	37	
5	EPS	22	11	3	8	53	41	+12	36	
6	FC Västnyland	22	11	2	9	62	40	+22	35	
7	Team Grani	22	10	3	9	51	56	−5	33	
8	MasKi	22	8	6	8	56	43	+13	30	
9	Tikka	22	7	4	11	34	50	−16	25	
10	KyIF/FCK2	22	5	8	9	26	55	−29	23	Relegated
11	IVU	22	2	2	18	27	78	−51	8	Relegated
12	ViTa	22	1	3	18	17	116	−99	6	Relegated

==== Section 2 ====
Pos	Team	Pld	W	D	L	GF	GA	GD	Pts	Promotion or relegation
1	Nopsa	22	17	2	3	59	26	+33	53	Promoted
2	Lahen Pojat JS	22	17	1	4	81	19	+62	52	
3	Akilles	22	13	2	7	56	34	+22	41	
4	FCD	22	13	2	7	55	36	+19	41	
5	OPedot	22	11	5	6	57	32	+25	38	
6	Kasiysi /Rocky	22	12	1	9	50	46	+4	37	
7	VJS	22	10	3	9	67	57	+10	33	
8	HyPS/02	22	9	1	12	34	56	−22	28	
9	Pathoven	22	6	3	13	40	55	−15	21	
10	KoiPS	22	6	1	15	27	56	−29	19	Relegated
11	Naseva	22	3	3	16	26	72	−46	12	Relegated
12	HooGee/1	22	3	0	19	24	87	−63	9	Relegated

=== South-East Finland (Kaakkois-Suomi) ===
Pos	Team	Pld	W	D	L	GF	GA	GD	Pts	Promotion or relegation
1	HP-47	22	18	1	3	93	29	+64	55	Promoted
2	FC Peltirumpu	22	17	1	4	84	43	+41	52	
3	FC Villisiat	22	15	4	3	44	24	+20	49	
4	KoPa	22	12	5	5	62	39	+23	41	
5	Lappee JK	22	12	4	6	76	46	+30	40	
6	KuP	22	8	4	10	37	44	−7	28	
7	LAUTP	22	7	5	10	39	40	−1	26	
8	SiU	22	7	5	10	42	50	−8	26	
9	STPS/2	22	6	2	14	40	50	−10	20	
10	Kiri	22	6	2	14	32	90	−58	20	
11	Ri-Pa	22	5	3	14	34	60	−26	18	Relegated
12	O Viesti	22	0	2	20	16	84	−68	2	Relegated

=== Eastern Finland (Itä-Suomi) ===
==== Section A ====
Pos	Team	Pld	W	D	L	GF	GA	GD	Pts	Qualification or relegation
1	JoPS /2	14	13	0	1	56	14	+42	39	Play-Offs
2	LehPa	14	9	3	2	44	19	+25	30	Play-Offs
3	Hurtat	14	6	1	7	33	39	−6	19	
4	JuPS	14	6	1	7	24	39	−15	19	
5	AFC Keltik	14	5	3	6	33	24	+9	18	
6	Yllätys	14	4	4	6	23	26	−3	16	
7	FC Pogosta	14	4	3	7	28	40	−12	15	Relegated
8	JuPy	14	1	1	12	13	53	−40	4	Relegated

==== Section B ====
Pos	Team	Pld	W	D	L	GF	GA	GD	Pts	Qualification or relegation
1	KuKi	16	10	1	5	55	30	+25	31	Play-Offs
2	PK-37 /2	16	8	6	2	45	27	+18	30	Play-Offs
3	SiPS /2	16	8	3	5	39	28	+11	27	
4	ToU	16	7	3	6	49	42	+7	24	
5	MPR	16	7	2	7	38	44	−6	23	
6	SoU	16	6	5	5	24	28	−4	23	
7	LiPa	16	6	3	7	28	39	−11	21	Relegated
8	NP-H	16	5	1	10	31	37	−6	16	Relegated
9	PAVE	16	3	0	13	26	60	−34	9	Relegated

==== Play-Offs (leading teams) ====
Pos	Team	Pld	W	D	L	GF	GA	GD	Pts
1	JoPS /2	6	4	1	1	19	7	+12	13
2	KuKi	6	3	1	2	18	16	+2	10
3	PK-37 /2	6	1	3	2	12	14	−2	6
4	LehPa	6	1	1	4	5	17	−12	4

==== Play-Offs (middle teams) ====
Pos	Team	Pld	W	D	L	GF	GA	GD	Pts
1	SiPS /2	10	6	2	2	34	19	+15	20
2	ToU	10	6	2	2	39	18	+21	20
3	SoU	10	4	3	3	24	21	+3	15
4	JuPS	10	5	0	5	14	30	−16	15
5	Hurtat	10	5	0	5	25	32	−7	15
6	MPR	10	3	3	4	22	27	−5	12
7	Yllätys	10	2	3	5	13	23	−10	9
8	AFC Keltik	10	1	3	6	23	24	−1	6

=== Central Finland (Keski-Suomi) ===
Pos	Team	Pld	W	D	L	GF	GA	GD	Pts
1	U.S. Skädäm/FP JKL	18	12	3	3	63	31	+32	39
2	FC Keitelejazz	18	12	1	5	53	37	+16	37
3	FC Saarijärvi	18	9	5	4	46	34	+12	32
4	SäyRi	18	10	2	6	46	34	+12	32
5	KeuPa	18	7	3	8	35	34	+1	24
6	LPK	18	6	4	8	39	45	−6	22
7	HPP	18	7	1	10	38	51	−13	22
8	Souls AC	18	6	1	11	40	52	−12	19
9	KaDy	18	5	1	12	28	51	−23	16
10	Huki	18	4	3	11	26	45	−19	15

=== Northern Finland (Pohjois-Suomi) ===
==== Oulu ====
Pos	Team	Pld	W	D	L	GF	GA	GD	Pts	Relegation
1	OTP	16	12	3	1	39	16	+23	39	
2	HauPa 2	16	10	4	2	38	19	+19	34	
3	FC Kurenpojat	16	10	2	4	41	21	+20	32	
4	Ajax-Sarkkiranta	16	10	1	5	48	28	+20	31	
5	FC Nets	16	8	1	7	34	32	+2	25	
6	OuRe	16	3	4	9	22	42	−20	13	
7	MuhU	16	4	1	11	44	54	−10	13	
8	OuJK	16	3	2	11	17	43	−26	11	
9	FC RAI	16	2	2	12	27	55	−28	8	Relegated

==== Lapland (Lappi) ====
Pos	Team	Pld	W	D	L	GF	GA	GD	Pts	Promotion
1	FC Muurola	18	16	1	1	68	23	+45	49	Promoted
2	ToTa	18	15	0	3	61	18	+43	45	
3	KemPa	18	11	2	5	46	26	+20	35	
4	Kolarin Kontio	18	10	1	7	42	35	+7	31	
5	PaPa	18	10	0	8	48	40	+8	30	
6	SoPa	18	8	3	7	43	41	+2	27	
7	KiPS	18	6	0	12	29	70	−41	18	
8	TP-47 2	18	5	0	13	32	46	−14	15	
9	FC-88 Akatemia	18	4	1	13	30	41	−11	13	
10	FC Rio Grande	18	1	0	17	24	83	−59	3	

=== Central Ostrobothnia (Keski-Pohjanmaa) ===
Pos	Team	Pld	W	D	L	GF	GA	GD	Pts	Promotion or relegation
1	GBK II	22	18	1	3	76	38	+38	55	Promoted
2	FC YPA II	22	16	2	4	76	31	+45	50	
3	NIK	22	16	2	4	68	28	+40	50	
4	No Stars	22	13	2	7	53	45	+8	41	
5	LoVe	22	9	2	11	43	55	−12	29	
6	IK Myran	22	9	2	11	32	44	−12	29	
7	Sääripotku	22	8	2	12	52	60	−8	26	
8	HBK	22	7	4	11	45	47	−2	25	
9	PeFF	22	6	5	11	41	52	−11	23	
10	K-Pallo	22	5	4	13	30	59	−29	19	
11	RyPK-84	22	5	3	14	31	57	−26	18	Relegated
12	OuHu	22	3	5	14	28	59	−31	14	Relegated

=== Vaasa ===
Pos	Team	Pld	W	D	L	GF	GA	GD	Pts	Promotion or relegation
1	SJK /2	20	16	2	2	90	24	+66	50	Promoted
2	KoFF /PeIK	20	13	3	4	45	25	+20	42	
3	Ponnistus	20	11	3	6	41	32	+9	36	
4	Närpes Kraft /2	20	10	1	9	43	34	+9	31	
5	Kungliga Wasa C.F.	20	7	5	8	40	48	−8	26	
6	SuSi Young Boys	20	6	6	8	41	40	+1	24	
7	Malax IF	20	7	3	10	38	49	−11	24	
8	FC Kuffen	20	7	2	11	44	58	−14	23	
9	Kaskö IK	20	5	6	9	34	43	−9	21	
10	Sisu-Pallo	20	5	5	10	27	55	−28	20	
11	ABC	20	2	6	12	27	62	−35	12	Relegated

=== Satakunta ===
Pos	Team	Pld	W	D	L	GF	GA	GD	Pts	Promotion or relegation
1	TOVE	20	15	3	2	128	33	+95	48	Promoted
2	PTU	20	14	1	5	91	40	+51	43	
3	Nasta	20	14	1	5	72	45	+27	43	
4	EuPa2	20	13	2	5	81	39	+42	41	
5	Koitto	20	11	4	5	82	36	+46	37	
6	FC Jazz2	20	9	4	7	60	52	+8	31	
7	HNS	20	8	5	7	57	49	+8	29	
8	LuVe	20	6	2	12	43	61	−18	20	
9	FC Ulvila	20	6	1	13	43	69	−26	19	
10	PoSa	20	2	1	17	29	122	−93	7	
11	MInto	20	0	0	20	21	161	−140	0	Relegated

=== Tampere ===
Pos	Team	Pld	W	D	L	GF	GA	GD	Pts	Promotion or relegation
1	TP-T	24	17	5	2	71	28	+43	56	Promoted
2	PATO	24	14	4	6	71	42	+29	46	Promoted
3	Loiske	24	12	7	5	62	34	+28	43	
4	FC Tampere FCT	24	13	4	7	58	38	+20	43	
5	TP-49	24	10	8	6	62	41	+21	38	
6	PP-70	24	11	1	12	46	65	−19	34	
7	FJK	24	9	4	11	51	44	+7	31	
8	NePa	24	7	6	11	33	36	−3	27	
9	LaVe	24	7	5	12	26	63	−37	26	
10	KaVo	24	7	4	13	39	50	−11	25	
11	ParVi	24	7	4	13	37	61	−24	25	Relegated
12	Sopu	24	7	2	15	30	70	−40	23	Relegated
13	LeKi-futis	24	6	4	14	36	50	−14	22	Relegated

=== Turku and Åland (Turku and Ahvenanmaa) ===
Pos	Team	Pld	W	D	L	GF	GA	GD	Pts	Promotion or relegation
1	JyTy	22	18	3	1	80	22	+58	57	Promoted
2	HammIK	22	12	4	6	64	36	+28	40	
3	UPK	22	11	5	6	66	42	+24	38	
4	TuWe	22	10	4	8	53	51	+2	34	
5	MynPa	22	8	7	7	58	52	+6	31	
6	SCR	22	9	4	9	48	54	−6	31	
7	SaTo	22	8	4	10	43	44	−1	28	
8	PiPS	22	8	3	11	45	51	−6	27	
9	TPK 2	22	8	3	11	41	71	−30	27	
10	FC RP	22	7	3	12	41	59	−18	24	Relegated
11	ÅIFK 2	22	6	3	13	24	37	−13	21	Relegated
12	PaiHa	22	4	3	15	26	70	−44	15	Relegated

== References and sources ==
- Finnish FA
- ResultCode
