= SPL Keski-Suomen piiri =

Finnish district level football organization

Suomen Palloliiton Keski-Suomen piiri
- Abbreviation: SPL Keski-Suomi
- Purpose: District Football Association
- Location(s): Rautpohjankatu 10 40700 Jyväskylä Finland
- Director: Ari Matinlassi
- Website: keski-suomi.palloliitto.fi

The SPL Keski-Suomen piiri (Central Finland Football Association) was one of the 12 district organisations of the Football Association of Finland. It administered lower tier football in Central Finland.

== Background ==
Suomen Palloliitto Keski-Suomen piiri, commonly referred to as SPL Keski-Suomen piiri or SPL Keski-Suomi, is the governing body for football in Central Finland. Based in Jyväskylä, the Association's Director is Ari Matinlassi.

== Member clubs ==
Abbreviation	Settlement	Official name	Division	Cup	Other information
BET	Jyväskylä	Blue Eyes Team	Kolmonen	* *	
FC K-Jazz	Äänekoski	FC Keitelejazz	Vitonen	* *	
FC Saarijärvi	Saarijärvi	FC Saarijärvi	Nelonen	*	
FCV	Jyväskylä	FC Vaajakoski	Kolmonen	* * *	
FCJ	Jyväskylä	FC Jyväskylä Blackbird	Kolmonen	* * *	
FCK	Jyväskylä	Football Club Kurd	Vitonen	* *	
FCV Reds	Vaajakoski, Jyväskylä	FC Vaajakoski / Reds	Vitonen	*	
FP JKL (U.S.Skädäm)	Jyväskylä	U.S. Skädäm / FP JKL	Vitonen	*	
Harjun Potku (BET)	Jyväskylä	Blue Eyes Team / Harjun Potku	Vitonen	*	
HPP	Haapamäki, Keuruu	Haapamäen Pallo-Pojat	Nelonen	*	
Huima	Äänekoski	Äänekosken Huima	Kolmonen	* *	
Huki	Jyväskylä	Huki Jyväskylä	Nelonen	*	
JIlves	Jämsänkoski, Jämsä	Jämsänkosken Ilves	Nelonen	* *	
JIlves II	Jämsänkoski, Jämsä	Jämsänkosken Ilves / II	Vitonen	*	
JJK	Jyväskylä	Jyväskylän Jalkapalloklubi	Veikkausliiga	* * *	
JoSePa	Joutsa	Joutsan Seudun Pallo	Vitonen	*	
JPS	Jyväskylä	Jyväskylän Seudun Palloseura	Kolmonen	* *	
KaDy	Jyväskylä	FC Kampuksen Dynamo	Nelonen	*	
KaDy II	Jyväskylä	FC Kampuksen Dynamo / II	Vitonen	*	
KaPa-51	Kangasniemi	Kangasniemen Palloilijat	Kolmonen	*	
KeuPa	Keuruu	Keuruun Pallo	Nelonen	* *	
Kiva	Karstula	Karstulan Kiva	Vitonen	*	
KonnU	Konnevesi	Konneveden Urheilijat	Vitonen	*	
LPK	Jyväskylä	Lohikosken Pallokerho	Nelonen	*	
MultiAnts	Multia	MultiAnts	Vitonen	*	
Mustarastas	Jyväskylä	FC Blackbird / Mustarastas	Vitonen	*	
Nousu	Jyväskylä	Jyväskylän Nousu	Vitonen	*	
PaRi	Palokka, Jyväskylä	Palokan Riento	Nelonen	* *	
PaRi II	Palokka, Jyväskylä	Palokan Riento / II	Vitonen	*	
PetPet	Petäjävesi	Petäjäveden Petäiset	Vitonen	*	
SäyRi	Säynätsalo, Jyväskylä	Säynätsalon Riento	Nelonen	*	
Souls AC	Jyväskylä	Souls AC	Nelonen	* *	
Urho	Suolahti, Äänekoski	Suolahden Urho	Vitonen	*	
ViPa	Vihtavuori, Laukaa	Vihtavuoren Pamaus	Kakkonen	* *	
VJK	Viitasaari	Viitasaaren Jalkapalloklubi	Vitonen	* *	
Huima	Äänekoski	Äänekosken Huima	Kolmonen	*	

== League Competitions ==
SPL Keski-Suomen piiri run the following league competitions:

=== Men's Football ===
- Division 3 - Kolmonen - one section
- Division 4 - Nelonen - one section
- Division 5 - Vitonen - one section

=== Ladies Football ===
- Division 3 - Kolmonen - one section
