= FC Kiisto =

Finnish football club

- Founded: 1904 (Vaasan Kiisto); 1949 (refounded); 1999 (FC Kiisto)
- Ground: Kaarlen kenttä, Vaasa
- Capacity: 5,500
- Chairman: Arja Bondas
- Manager: Marko Salo
- Coach: Jan-Christian Westermark
- League: Kolmonen
- 2023: 5th – Kolmonen
Home colours	Away colours

FC Kiisto is a Finnish football club, based in the city of Vaasa. It currently plays in Kolmonen (Third Division).

== History ==
Vaasan Kiisto was founded in September 1904 in Vaasa Finnish Gymnasiums gym hall, after members of Vaasa Workers Association saw a need for separate Gymnastics and Sports Club. Kiisto started to play football in 1908. In the 1918 Finnish Civil War some members of the club participated as a red guards and as a result club was dismissed from Finnish Gymnastics and Sports Federation (SVUL) and as a result joined newly formed Finnish Workers' Sports Federation. In 1931 Club was dismissed by court as a communist organisation, after playing a friendly match against football team from Soviet Union. Club was re-founded in 1949 and football was taken again to club repertoire in 1954. In 1999 when football had become considerably big part of club activity, FC Kiisto was separated from Vaasan Kiisto.

== Season to season ==
Season to Season

Season	Level	Division	Section	Administration	Position	Movements
1954	Tier 3	Maakuntasarja (Third Division)	North Group IV	Finnish FA (Suomen Pallolitto)	4th	
1955	Tier 3	Maakuntasarja (Third Division)	North Group II	Finnish FA (Suomen Pallolitto)	6th	
1956	Tier 3	Maakuntasarja (Third Division)	North Group II	Finnish FA (Suomen Pallolitto)	2nd	
1957	Tier 3	Maakuntasarja (Third Division)	North Group I	Finnish FA (Suomen Pallolitto)	7th	
1958	Tier 3	Maakuntasarja (Third Division)	Group 8	Finnish FA (Suomen Pallolitto)	5th	
1959	Tier 3	Maakuntasarja (Third Division)	Group 8	Finnish FA (Suomen Pallolitto)	4th	
1960	Tier 3	Maakuntasarja (Third Division)	Group 8	Finnish FA (Suomen Pallolitto)	2nd	
1961	Tier 3	Maakuntasarja (Third Division)	Group 8	Finnish FA (Suomen Pallolitto)	8th	Relegated
1962	Tier 4	Aluesarja (Fourth Division)	Group 15	Finnish FA (Suomen Pallolitto)	2nd	
1963	Tier 4	Aluesarja (Fourth Division)	Group 15	Finnish FA (Suomen Pallolitto)	1st	Promoted
1964	Tier 3	Maakuntasarja (Third Division)	Group 8	Finnish FA (Suomen Pallolitto)	6th	
1965	Tier 3	Maakuntasarja (Third Division)	Group 8	Finnish FA (Suomen Pallolitto)	8th	Relegated
1966	Tier 4	Aluesarja (Fourth Division)	Group 15	Finnish FA (Suomen Pallolitto)	5th	
1967	Tier 4	Aluesarja (Fourth Division)	Group 15	Finnish FA (Suomen Pallolitto)	5th	
1968	Tier 4	Aluesarja (Fourth Division)	Group 14	Finnish FA (Suomen Pallolitto)	1st	Promoted
1969	Tier 3	Maakuntasarja (Third Division)	Group 7	Finnish FA (Suomen Pallolitto)	8th	Relegated
1970	Tier 4	IV Divisioona (Fourth Division)	Group 15	Finnish FA (Suomen Pallolitto)	1st	Promoted
1971	Tier 3	III Divisioona (Third Division)	Group 6	Finnish FA (Suomen Pallolitto)	8th	
1972	Tier 3	III Divisioona (Third Division)	Group 8	Finnish FA (Suomen Pallolitto)	10th	Relegated
1973	Tier 5	IV Divisioona (Fourth Division)	Group 15 - Vaasa	Vaasa District (SPL Vaasa)	8th	
1974	Tier 5	IV Divisioona (Fourth Division)	Group 15 - Vaasa	Vaasa District (SPL Vaasa)	10th	Relegated
1975						
1976	Tier 6	V Divisioona (Fifth Division)		Vaasa District (SPL Vaasa)		
1977						
1978						
1979						
1980						
1981						
1982						
1983	Tier 5	IV Divisioona (Fourth Division)	Group 15 - Vaasa	Vaasa District (SPL Vaasa)	7th	
1984	Tier 5	IV Divisioona (Fourth Division)	Group 15 - Vaasa	Vaasa District (SPL Vaasa)	9th	
1985	Tier 5	IV Divisioona (Fourth Division)	Group 15 - Vaasa	Vaasa District (SPL Vaasa)	3rd	
1986	Tier 5	IV Divisioona (Fourth Division)	Group 15 - Vaasa	Vaasa District (SPL Vaasa)	1st	Promoted
1987	Tier 4	III Divisioona (Third Division)	Group 7	Vaasa District (SPL Vaasa)	10th	Relegated
1988						
1989						
1990						
1991	Tier 5	IV Divisioona (Fourth Division)	Group 15 - Vaasa	Vaasa District (SPL Vaasa)	5th	
1992						
1993						
1994	Tier 5	Nelonen (Fourth Division)	Group 15 - Vaasa	Vaasa District (SPL Vaasa)	1st	Promoted
1995	Tier 4	Kolmonen (Third Division)	Group 7	Vaasa District (SPL Vaasa)	11th	Relegated
1996						
1997						
1998						
1999	Tier 4	Kolmonen (Third Division)	Group 7	Vaasa District (SPL Vaasa)	1st	Promoted
2000	Tier 3	Kakkonen (Second Division)	North Group	Finnish FA (Suomen Pallolitto)	7th	
2001	Tier 3	Kakkonen (Second Division)	North Group	Finnish FA (Suomen Pallolitto)	4th	
2002	Tier 3	Kakkonen (Second Division)	North Group	Finnish FA (Suomen Pallolitto)	5th	
2003	Tier 3	Kakkonen (Second Division)	North Group	Finnish FA (Suomen Pallolitto)	7th	
2004	Tier 3	Kakkonen (Second Division)	North Group	Finnish FA (Suomen Pallolitto)	5th	
2005	Tier 3	Kakkonen (Second Division)	North Group	Finnish FA (Suomen Pallolitto)	2nd	
2006	Tier 3	Kakkonen (Second Division)	Group C	Finnish FA (Suomen Pallolitto)	9th	
2007	Tier 3	Kakkonen (Second Division)	Group C	Finnish FA (Suomen Pallolitto)	4th	
2008	Tier 3	Kakkonen (Second Division)	Group C	Finnish FA (Suomen Pallolitto)	1st	Promoted
2009	Tier 2	Ykkönen (First Division)		Finnish FA (Suomen Pallolitto)	14th	Relegated
2010	Tier 3	Kakkonen (Second Division)	Group C	Finnish FA (Suomen Pallolitto)	8th	
2011	Tier 3	Kakkonen (Second Division)	Group C	Finnish FA (Suomen Pallolitto)	6th	
2012	Tier 3	Kakkonen (Second Division)	West Group	Finnish FA (Suomen Pallolitto)	9th	Relegated
2013	Tier 4	Kolmonen (Third Division)	Central Ostrobothnia & Vaasa	Vaasa District (SPL Vaasa)	2nd	
2014	Tier 4	Kolmonen (Third Division)	Central Ostrobothnia & Vaasa	Vaasa District (SPL Vaasa)	1st	Promoted
2015	Tier 3	Kakkonen (Second Division)	North Group	Finnish FA (Suomen Pallolitto)	10th	Relegated
2016	Tier 4	Kolmonen (Third Division)	Central Ostrobothnia & Vaasa	Vaasa District (SPL Vaasa)	5th	
2017	Tier 4	Kolmonen (Third Division)	Central Ostrobothnia & Vaasa	Vaasa District (SPL Vaasa)	2nd	
2018	Tier 4	Kolmonen (Third Division)	Central Ostrobothnia & Vaasa	Vaasa District (SPL Vaasa)	2nd	
2019	Tier 4	Kolmonen (Third Division)	Central Ostrobothnia & Vaasa	Keski-Pohjanmaa District (SPL Keski-Pohjanmaa)	1st	Promoted
2020	Tier 3	Kakkonen (Second Division)	Group C	Finnish FA (Suomen Pallolitto)	12nd	Relegated
2021	Tier 4	Kolmonen (Third Division)	Central Ostrobothnia & Vaasa	Keski-Pohjanmaa District (SPL Keski-Pohjanmaa)	2nd	
2022	Tier 4	Kolmonen (Third Division)	Central Ostrobothnia & Vaasa	Keski-Pohjanmaa District (SPL Keski-Pohjanmaa)	5th	
2023	Tier 4	Kolmonen (Third Division)	Central Ostrobothnia & Vaasa	Keski-Pohjanmaa District (SPL Keski-Pohjanmaa)	5th	
2024	Tier 4	Kolmonen (Third Division)	Central Ostrobothnia & Vaasa	Keski-Pohjanmaa District (SPL Keski-Pohjanmaa)	3rd	

- 1 season in Ykkönen
- 27 seasons in Kakkonen
- 18 seasons in Kolmonen
- 8 seasons in Nelonen
- 1 seasons in Vitonen

== 2025 season ==
For the current season, FC Kiisto are competing in Group C West of the Kolmonen (Third Division). This is the fourth tier of the Finnish football system. In 2024, the team finished in third position in the Kolmonen

== Current squad ==
Note: Flags indicate national team as defined under FIFA eligibility rules; some limited exceptions apply. Players may hold more than one non-FIFA nationality.

No.	Pos.	Nation	Player
1	GK	(Finland) FIN	Jukka Pylväinen
2	DF	(Finland) FIN	Ilari Antila
3	DF	(Finland) FIN	Miikka Vedenjuoksu
4	DF	(Finland) FIN	Mikael Nurmi
5	DF	(Finland) FIN	Tomi Paananen
6	MF	(South Sudan) SSD	Mustafa Maki
7	MF	(Finland) FIN	Toni Pylkkänen
9	FW	(Finland) FIN	Amadeus Ekman
10	MF	(Finland) FIN	Pekka Liukkonen (captain)
12	GK	(Finland) FIN	Teemu Kulmala
14	MF	(Finland) FIN	Matias Träskbäck

No.	Pos.	Nation	Player
16	FW	(Finland) FIN	Campus Lindgård
17	MF	(Finland) FIN	Lauri Karri
18	MF	(Finland) FIN	Ossi Katajamäki
19	MF	(Finland) FIN	Roni Jääskä
21	MF	(Finland) FIN	Olli Katajamäki
22	GK	(Finland) FIN	Valtteri Lähde
24	DF	(Finland) FIN	Nicolas Tuisku
25	FW	(Finland) FIN	Tobias De Cet
26	DF	(Finland) FIN	Arthur Lindholm
28	DF	(Finland) FIN	Kasper Muurimäki
-	DF	(Finland) FIN	Juska Päivänurmi
