= Taneli Nykänen =

Finnish politician

Daniel (Taneli) Nykänen (15 September 1845, in Pieksämäki – 8 November 1927) was a Finnish farmer and politician. He was a member of the Diet of Finland in 1888, from 1897 to 1900 and from 1904 to 1906 and of the Parliament of Finland from 1907 to 1909, representing the Finnish Party.
