= Antti Nykänen =

Finnish basketball player (born 1983)

Antti Nykänen (born 14 October 1983 in Kellokoski, Finland) is a Finnish professional basketball player.

Nykänen currently plays for the Plymouth Raiders in the British Basketball League; the 6 ft 6 in (1.98 m) forward is now in his second season with the first team. Although having spent much of his time in Raiders' development teams, he has yet to break into the starting five.

From 2001 to 2002 Nykänen studied at Sierra High School in Tollhouse, California. Since 2005, besides playing, he has studied Sports' Management at the University of Plymouth.
