= FC Korsholm =

Finnish football club

- Full name: FC Korsholm
- Nickname(s): Korsholm
- Founded: 1998; 27 years ago
- Ground: Botniahalli, Sepänkylän keskusurheilukenttä Korsholm; Finland
- Chairman: Calle Berg
- Coach: Jouni Väkeväinen
- League: Kolmonen
Home colours

FC Korsholm is a football club from Korsholm, the mainly Swedish-speaking municipality that surrounds the city of Vaasa, in Finland. The club was formed in 1998 and their home ground is at the Botniahalli, Sepänkylän keskusurheilukenttä. The men's first team currently plays in the Kolmonen (Third Division).

== Background ==
FC Korsholm was founded in 1998 with the concept of enabling the promising young players of Korsholm to have the opportunity to develop their football potential as a team and as individuals in their own local club. They were very fortunate to begin their initiative at a high level in the Kakkonen by taking over IF Hoppet, a team from Helsingby, Korsholm. Who used to play their home games at "Gryton".

FC Korsholm has played 2 seasons in the Ykkönen (First Division), the second tier of Finnish football in the period 2002 to 2003. They also have had eight spells in the third tier, the Kakkonen (Second Division), from 1998 to 2001, 2004 to 2006 and in 2010.

== Season to season ==
Season	Level	Division	Section	Administration	Position	Movements
1998	Tier 3	Kakkonen (Second Division)	West Group	Finnish FA (Suomen Pallolitto)	9th	
1999	Tier 3	Kakkonen (Second Division)	North Group	Finnish FA (Suomen Pallolitto)	4th	
2000	Tier 3	Kakkonen (Second Division)	North Group	Finnish FA (Suomen Pallolitto)	3rd	
2001	Tier 3	Kakkonen (Second Division)	North Group	Finnish FA (Suomen Pallolitto)	1st	Promoted
2002	Tier 2	Ykkönen (First Division)	North Group	Finnish FA (Suomen Pallolitto)	9th	Relegation Group – Play-offs
2003	Tier 2	Ykkönen (First Division)		Finnish FA (Suomen Pallolitto)	14th	Relegated
2004	Tier 3	Kakkonen (Second Division)	North Group	Finnish FA (Suomen Pallolitto)	7th	
2005	Tier 3	Kakkonen (Second Division)	North Group	Finnish FA (Suomen Pallolitto)	8th	
2006	Tier 3	Kakkonen (Second Division)	Group C	Finnish FA (Suomen Pallolitto)	12th	Relegated
2007	Tier 4	Kolmonen (Third Division)	Central Ostrobothnia and Vaasa	Vaasa District (SPL Vaasa)	4th	
2008	Tier 4	Kolmonen (Third Division)	Central Ostrobothnia and Vaasa	Vaasa District (SPL Vaasa)	2nd	Autumn – 3rd
2009	Tier 4	Kolmonen (Third Division)	Central Ostrobothnia and Vaasa	Vaasa District (SPL Vaasa)	1st	Promoted
2010	Tier 3	Kakkonen (Second Division)	Group C	Finnish FA (Suomen Pallolitto)	14th	Relegated
2011	Tier 4	Kolmonen (Third Division)	Central Ostrobothnia and Vaasa	Vaasa District (SPL Vaasa)	2nd	
2012	Tier 4	Kolmonen (Third Division)	Central Ostrobothnia and Vaasa	Vaasa District (SPL Vaasa)	5th	
2013	Tier 4	Kolmonen (Third Division)	Central Ostrobothnia and Vaasa	Vaasa District (SPL Vaasa)	5th	
2014	Tier 4	Kolmonen (Third Division)	Central Ostrobothnia and Vaasa	Vaasa District (SPL Vaasa)	5th	
2015	Tier 4	Kolmonen (Third Division)	Central Ostrobothnia and Vaasa	Vaasa District (SPL Vaasa)	9th	
2016	Tier 4	Kolmonen (Third Division)	Central Ostrobothnia and Vaasa	Vaasa District (SPL Vaasa)	12th	Relegated
2017	Tier 5	Nelonen (Fourth Division)	Vaasa	Vaasa District (SPL Vaasa)	7th	
2018	Tier 5	Nelonen (Fourth Division)	Vaasa	Vaasa District (SPL Vaasa)	9th	
2019	Tier 5	Nelonen (Fourth Division)	Vaasa	Vaasa District (SPL Vaasa)	10th	

- 2 seasons in Ykkönen
- 8 seasons in Kakkonen
- 9 seasons in Kolmonen
- 3 seasons in Nelonen

== Club Structure ==
FC Korsholm runs 2 men's teams and 1 veteran's side, the Old Boys. The club does not currently have a junior section.

== 2010 season ==
FC Korsholm Men's Team were competing in Group C (Lohko C) of the Kakkonen administered by the Football Association of Finland (Suomen Palloliitto) . This is the third highest tier in the Finnish football system. In 2009 Korsholm finished in first position in their Kolmonen (Third Division) section and were promoted to the Kakkonen.

FC Korsholm Young Boys are participating in the Vitonen (Fifth Division) section administered by the Vaasa SPL.

== References and sources ==
- Official Website
- Finnish Wikipedia
- Suomen Cup
