= FC Ulvila =

Finnish football club

- Full name: FC Ulvila (Vanhankylän Alku ry)
- Founded: 1914
- Ground: Mynsterin kenttä, Ulvila, Finland
- Capacity: 800
- Chairman: Markus Palomäki
- Coach: Jani Kyllinen (Finland) Esa Tuovila
- League: Kolmonen
Home colours

FC Ulvila is a football club from Ulvila, Finland. The club was formed in 1914 as Vanhankylän Alku and their home ground is at the Mynsterin kenttä. The men's first team currently plays in the Kolmonen (Third Division).

== Background ==
Vanhankylän Alku (abbreviated VAlku) was founded in 1914 and has been known as FC Ulvila since 2007. The club specialised in football during the 1990s and to date has participated in the lower divisions of the Finnish football league.

== Season to season ==
Season	Level	Division	Section	Administration	Position	Movements
1999	Tier 5	Nelonen (Fourth Division)		Satakunta District (SPL Satakunta)	7th	VAlku – Promoted
2000	Tier 4	Kolmonen (Third Division)		Satakunta District (SPL Satakunta)	6th	VAlku
2001	Tier 4	Kolmonen (Third Division)		Satakunta District (SPL Satakunta)	5th	VAlku
2002	Tier 4	Kolmonen (Third Division)		Satakunta District (SPL Satakunta)	10th	VAlku – Relegated
2003	Tier 5	Nelonen (Fourth Division)		Satakunta District (SPL Satakunta)	1st	VAlku – Promoted
2004	Tier 4	Kolmonen (Third Division)		Satakunta District (SPL Satakunta)	5th	VAlku
2005	Tier 4	Kolmonen (Third Division)		Satakunta District (SPL Satakunta)	7th	VAlku
2006	Tier 4	Kolmonen (Third Division)		Satakunta District (SPL Satakunta)	8th	VAlku
2007	Tier 4	Kolmonen (Third Division)		Satakunta District (SPL Satakunta)	9th	
2008	Tier 4	Kolmonen (Third Division)		Satakunta District (SPL Satakunta)	9th	
2009	Tier 4	Kolmonen (Third Division)		Satakunta District (SPL Satakunta)	10th	
2010	Tier 4	Kolmonen (Third Division)		Satakunta District (SPL Satakunta)		

- 10 seasons in Kolmonen
- 2 seasons in Nelonen

== Club Structure ==
FC Ulvila run a large number of teams including 1 men's team, 1 ladies team, 7 boys teams and 3 girls teams. The club has around 300 registered players and since 10 January 2009 has employed a full-time Youth Coach.

== 2010 season ==
FC Ulvila are competing in the Kolmonen (Third Division) section administered by the Satakunta SPL. This is the fourth highest tier in the Finnish football system. In 2009 they finished in 10th place in the Kolmonen but were reprieved from relegation.

== References and sources ==
- Official Website
- Finnish Wikipedia
- FC Ulvila (Vanhankylän Alku) Facebook
