= Tuusulan Palloseura =

Finnish sports club

- Full name: Tuusulan Palloseura
- Nickname(s): TuPS
- Founded: 1971; 54 years ago
- Ground: Tuusulan urheilukeskus, Tuusula; Finland
- Capacity: 4,000
- Chairman: Jari Klemetti
- Coach: Marko Ignatius
- League: Kolmonen
- 2009: 7th – Kolmonen (Helsinki and Uusimaa)
Home colours

Tuusulan Palloseura (abbreviated TuPS) is a sports club from Tuusula in Finland. The club was formed in 1971 and their home ground is at the Tuusulan urheilukeskus. The men's football first team currently plays in the Kolmonen (Third Division) while the ladies team plays in Section A of the Kakkonen. The Chairman of TuPS is Jari Klemetti. In addition to football the club has been active in ice-hockey and ringette.

== Background ==
Tuusulan Palloseura was founded on 29 November 1971 as a football club serving the South Tuusula area. The club has expanded from 30 members to more than 700 members. In 2002 the club was awarded the quality seal in recognition of its high-quality youth activities.

TuPS has spent many seasons in the lower divisions of the Finnish football league. The club now acts as one of the three feeder clubs to the Pallokerho Keski-Uusimaa club, that now serves as the joint representative team for Central Uusimaa. This side currently plays in the Kakkonen.

The highlight of the TuPS ladies team has been playing in the SM championship league in 2001.

== Season to season ==
Season	Level	Division	Section	Administration	Position	Movements
1998	Tier 5	Nelonen (Fourth Division)	Section 4	Uusimaa District (SPL Uusimaa)	4th	
1999	Tier 5	Nelonen (Fourth Division)	Section 4	Uusimaa District (SPL Uusimaa)	3rd	Promoted
2000	Tier 4	Kolmonen (Third Division)	Section 2	Helsinki & Uusimaa (SPL Uusimaa)	6th	
2001	Tier 4	Kolmonen (Third Division)	Section 2	Helsinki & Uusimaa (SPL Uusimaa)	8th	
2002	Tier 4	Kolmonen (Third Division)	Section 2	Helsinki & Uusimaa (SPL Uusimaa)	3rd	
2003	Tier 4	Kolmonen (Third Division)	Section 2	Helsinki & Uusimaa (SPL Uusimaa)	8th	
2004	Tier 4	Kolmonen (Third Division)	Section 2	Helsinki & Uusimaa (SPL Uusimaa)	3rd	
2005	Tier 4	Kolmonen (Third Division)	Section 3	Helsinki & Uusimaa (SPL Uusimaa)	5th	
2006	Tier 4	Kolmonen (Third Division)	Section 2	Helsinki & Uusimaa (SPL Helsinki)	7th	
2007	Tier 4	Kolmonen (Third Division)	Section 2	Helsinki & Uusimaa (SPL Helsinki)	11th	Relegated
2008	Tier 5	Nelonen (Fourth Division)	Section 2	Uusimaa District (SPL Uusimaa)	2nd	Promoted
2009	Tier 4	Kolmonen (Third Division)	Section 2	Helsinki & Uusimaa (SPL Helsinki)	7th	
2010	Tier 4	Kolmonen (Third Division)	Section 3	Helsinki & Uusimaa (SPL Uusimaa)	5th	

- 10 seasons in Kolmonen
- 3 seasons in Nelonen

== Club Structure ==
TuPS currently has 2 men's teams, 2 veteran's teams, 2 ladies teams, 12 boys teams and 5 girls team.

== 2010 season ==
TuPS Men's Team are competing in Section 3 (Lohko 3) of the Kolmonen administered by the Football Association of Finland (Suomen Palloliitto) . This is the fourth highest tier in the Finnish football system. In 2009 Tuusulan Palloseura finished in seventh position in Section 2 of the Kolmonen (Third Division).

TuPS/2 are participating in Section 6 (Lohko 6) of the Kutonen administered by the Uusimaa SPL.

== References and sources ==
- Official Website
- Finnish Wikipedia
- Suomen Cup
- TUPS (Tuusulan Palloseura) Facebook
