= Kyrkslätt Idrottsförening =

Finnish sports club

Kyrkslätt IF
- Full name: Kyrkslätt Idrottsförening
- Nickname(s): KyIF
- Founded: 1924
- Ground: Kirkkonummen Keskusnurmi, Kirkkonummi; Finland
- League: Kolmonen
- 2009: 10th – Kolmonen (Helsinki & Uusimaa – Section 1)
Home colours

Kyrkslätt Idrottsföreningen (abbreviated KyIF and also known as Kyrkslätt IF) is a sports club from Kirkkonummi, Finland. The club was formed on 9 November 1924 and covers the sports of football, handball, skiing, alpine sports, gymnastics, horse riding, athletics and volleyball.

== Football ==
=== Background ===
The football section is known as FC Kirkkonummi (abbreviated FCK) and in the period 2003 until 2007 was known as FC Kirkkonummen Salamat . The men's first team currently plays in the Kolmonen (Third Division) and their home ground is at the Kirkkonummen Keskusnurmi.. The Chairman of FCK is Gustaf Åberg.

The club has played five seasons in the Kakkonen (Second Division), the third tier of Finnish football, in 1994–95 and 2003–05.

FCK is the largest football club in Kirkkonummi. The other clubs in the area are Masala Kisa who are based in Masala and Veikkolan Veikot who are situated in Veikkola. In addition there is the women's football club known as AC Kirkkonummi.

=== Season to Season ===
Season	Level	Division	Section	Administration	Position	Movements
2000	Tier 4	Kolmonen (Third Division)	Section 1	Helsinki & Uusimaa (SPL Helsinki)	4th	
2001	Tier 4	Kolmonen (Third Division)	Section 1	Helsinki & Uusimaa (SPL Uusimaa)	6th	
2002	Tier 4	Kolmonen (Third Division)	Section 1	Helsinki & Uusimaa (SPL Uusimaa)	1st	Promoted
2003	Tier 3	Kakkonen (Second Division)	South Group	Finnish FA (Suomen Pallolitto)	5th	FCK Salamat
2004	Tier 3	Kakkonen (Second Division)	South Group	Finnish FA (Suomen Pallolitto)	9th	FCK Salamat
2005	Tier 3	Kakkonen (Second Division)	South Group	Finnish FA (Suomen Pallolitto)	11th	FCK Salamat – Relegated
2006	Tier 4	Kolmonen (Third Division)	Section 1	Helsinki & Uusimaa (SPL Uusimaa)	12th	FCK Salamat – Relegated
2007	Tier 5	Nelonen (Fourth Division)	Section 1	Uusimaa (SPL Uusimaa)	1st	FCK Salamat – Promoted
2008	Tier 4	Kolmonen (Third Division)	Section 1	Helsinki & Uusimaa (SPL Uusimaa)	9th	
2009	Tier 4	Kolmonen (Third Division)	Section 1	Helsinki & Uusimaa (SPL Uusimaa)	10th	
2010	Tier 4	Kolmonen (Third Division)	Section 1	Helsinki & Uusimaa (SPL Uusimaa)	5th	

- 3 seasons in Kakkonen
- 7 seasons in Kolmonen
- 1 season in Nelonen

=== Club Structure ===
Kyrkslätts Idrottsförening run a large number of football teams including 2 men's teams, 1 veteran's team and 23 boys teams in a very active youth section.

=== 2010 season ===
For the current season KyIF FCK1 are competing in Section 1 (Lohko 1) of the Kolmonen administered by the Helsinki SPL and Uusimaa SPL. This is the fourth highest tier in the Finnish football system.

KyIF FCK2 are participating in Section 1 (Lohko 1) of the Vitonen administered by the Uusimaa SPL.

== References and sources ==
- Official Website
- Official Website of the Football Club
- Finnish Wikipedia
