= FC Kasiysi =

Finnish football club

- Founded: 1989
- Ground: Karakallion kenttä
- Coordinates: 60.2298°N 24.7589°E
- Coach: Jani Kovalainen
- League: Nelonen
- Website: www.fckasiysiespoo.fi

FC Kasiysi is a Finnish football club established in 1989 (Kasiysi means 89 in Finnish). The club is located in the city of Espoo and specialises in youth football at all levels. FC Kasiysi also serves as a youth developmental club for FC Espoo.

The club's men's team plays in the fourth division, the fifth tier of football in Finland.
