= Vähäkyrö =

Vähäkyrö Lillkyro
- Former municipality
- Vähäkyrön kunta Lillkyro kommun
- Coat of arms

- Location of Vähäkyrö in Finland
- Interactive map of Vähäkyrö
- Coordinates: 63°03.3′N 022°06.5′E
- Country: Finland
- Region: Ostrobothnia
- Sub-region: Kyrönmaa sub-region
- Charter: 1868
- Consolidated: 2013

Government
  - Municipal manager: Jouni Haapaniemi

Area
  - Total: 177.66 km^{2} (68.59 sq mi)
  - Land: 175.67 km^{2} (67.83 sq mi)
  - Water: 1.99 km^{2} (0.77 sq mi)

Population (31 December 2012)
  - Total: 4,727
- Time zone: UTC+2 (EET)
  - Summer (DST): UTC+3 (EEST)
- Website: www.vahakyro.fi

Vähäkyrö (Swedish: Lillkyro) is a former municipality of Finland and an exclave of the city of Vaasa since January 1, 2013.

It was located in the province of Western Finland and is part of the Ostrobothnia region. The municipality had a population of 4,727 (31 December 2012) and covered an area of 177.66 square kilometres (68.59 sq mi) of which 1.99 km^{2} (0.77 sq mi) was water. The population density was 26.908/km^{2}. The municipality was unilingually Finnish.

== Merger with Vaasa ==
Vähäkyrö held a referendum about joining Vaasa in May 2012, with 49% of votes against the amalgamation and 48% for it - the no side won by a margin of 13 votes. However, a vote held by the municipal council passed the amalgamation, overturning the referendum with 18 yes and 9 no votes. The vote held in Vaasa was unanimous, thus sealing the amalgamation. The municipality officially ceased to exist on New Year's Day 2013.

The amalgation of Vähäkyrö to Vaasa was historical in Finnish geography, because two municipalities without any common border merged for the first time, making Vähäkyrö an exclave of Vaasa and also the first exclave in the history of sovereign Finland. Even though the municipality of Säynätsalo was merged to Jyväskylä in 1993 and the two had no common border by land, Säynätsalo did not become an exclave because the municipalities shared a borderline of few hundred meters in the middle of Lake Päijänne.
