= Olari, Espoo =

Olari Olars
- District of Espoo
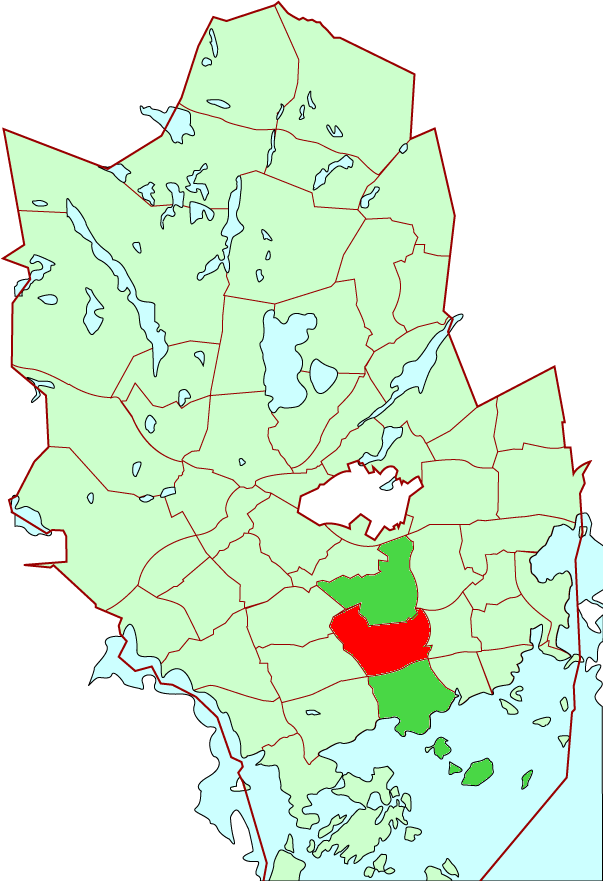
- Location of Olari within Espoo
- Coordinates: 60°10′N 24°45′E
- Country: Finland
- Municipality: Espoo
- Region: Uusimaa
- Sub-region: Greater Helsinki
- Main District: Suur-Matinkylä
- Inner District(s): Friisilä, Kuitinmäki, Olarinmäki

Population (2012)
  - Total: 15,176

Languages
  - Finnish: 86.9 %
  - Swedish: 8.6 %
  - Other: 4.5 %
- Jobs: 5,272

Olari (Finnish) or Olars (Swedish) is a district of the city of Espoo, Finland. Olari is located about 15 kilometres west of central Helsinki, north of the Länsiväylä highway and Matinkylä. The district has a population of about 15,000. The district is famous for its contribution to the Finnish rap culture. One of the most notable landmarks of the district is Olari Church and Parish Centre, designed by architects Simo and Käpy Paavilainen, and completed in 1981.

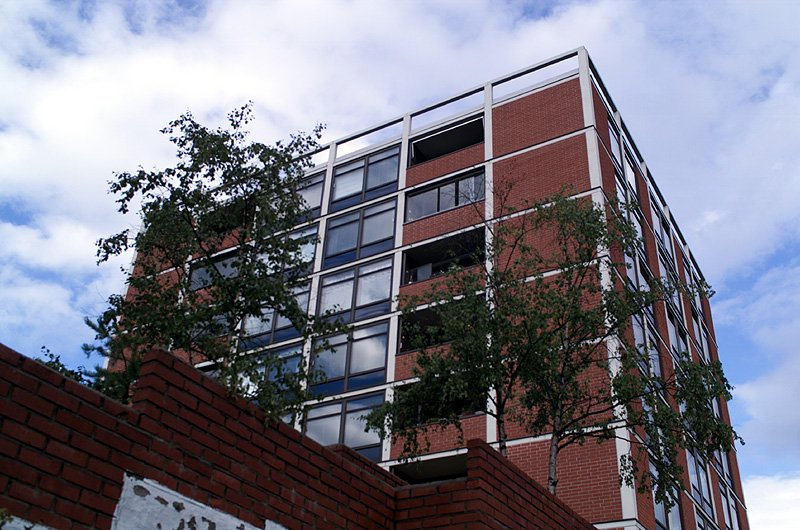
Apartment building

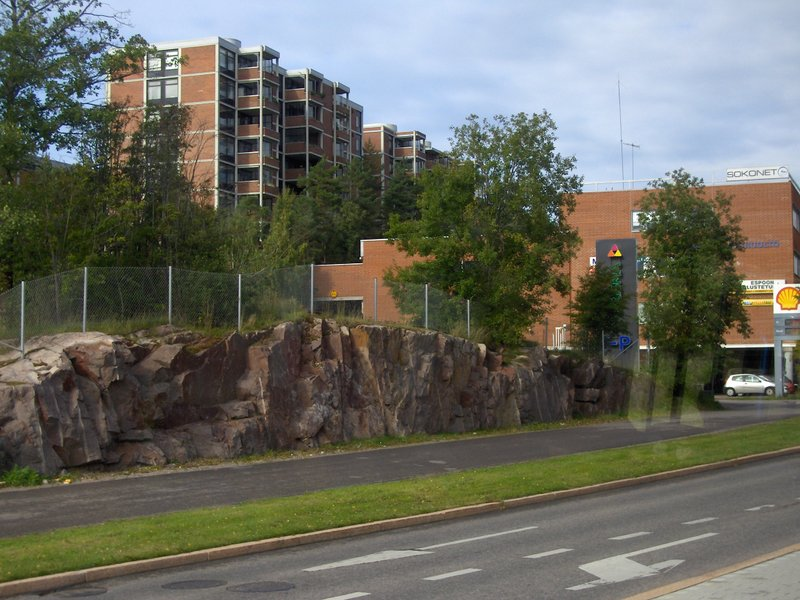
Apartment building

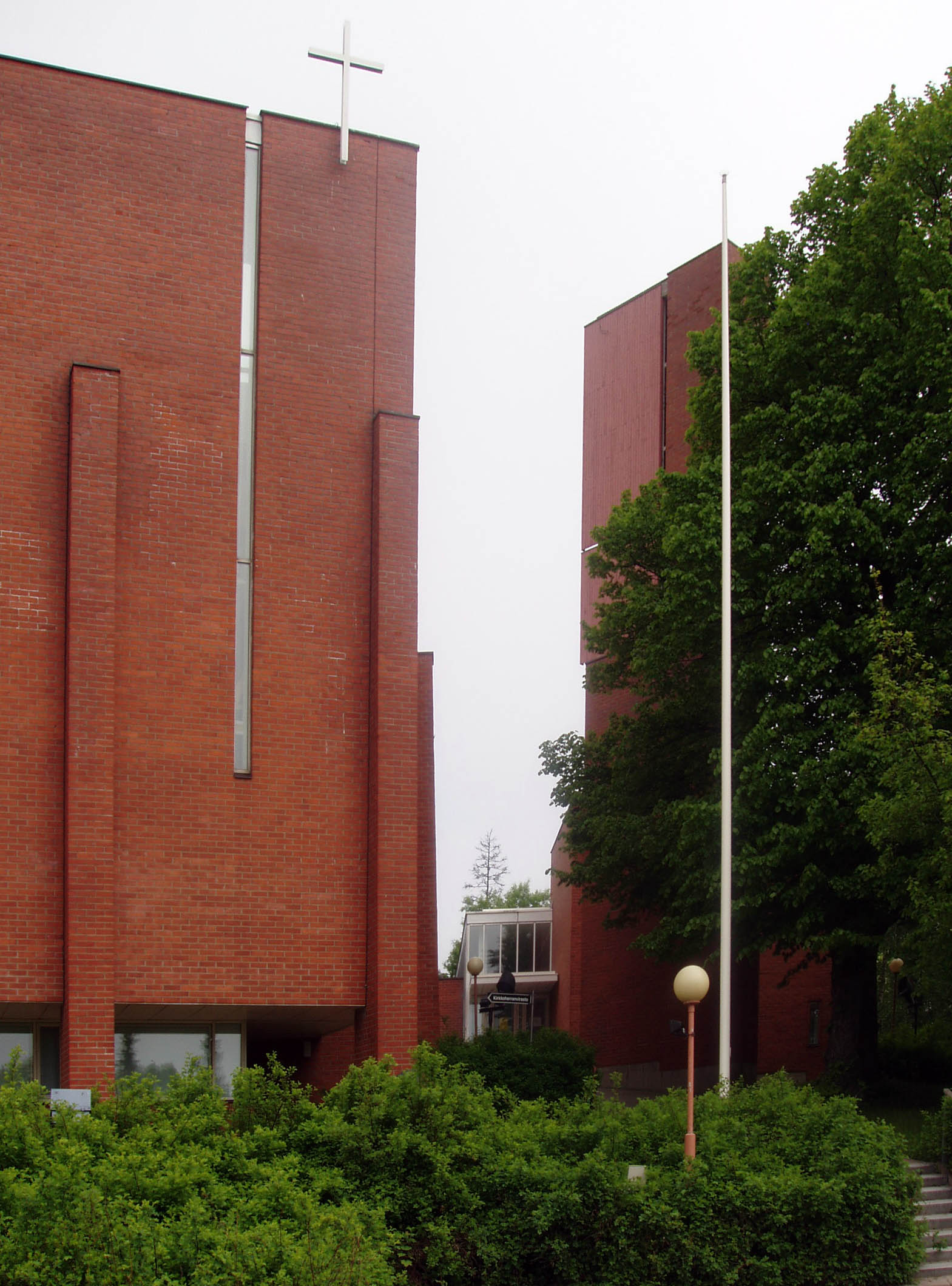
Olari Church

== See also ==
- Districts of Espoo
