= Valfrid Nykänen =

Finnish gymnast

- Born: 8 January 1894; Kotka, Grand Duchy of Finland, Russian Empire
- Died: February 1918; Hämeenkyrö, Finland
- Military career
- Allegiance: Russian Empire; White Finland
- Branch: Imperial Russian Air Service; White Guards
- Rank: Lieutenant
- Unit: 7FAO (IRAS)

Gymnastics career
- Discipline: Men's artistic gymnastics

Valfrid Ernhard "Poju" Nykänen (8 January 1894 – February 1918), was a Finnish World War I fighter pilot of the Imperial Russian Air Service. He was the first Finnish fighter pilot.

Nykänen graduated from the Kazan Military Academy in 1915 and served the Imperial Russian Army on the Western Front in Poland. Following training at Sevastopol he became a fighter pilot in May 1917. As a Nieuport pilot Nykänen flew on the Caucasus Front with four aerial victories. Nykänen claimed he was awarded with Golden Sword of St. George but any records of Nykänen's award are not found.

As the Finnish Civil War burst out in January 1918, Nykänen returned to Finland and fought for the White Guards on the Satakunta front. He was captured by the Red Guards and shot in February 1918.

Nykänen was also known as a talented athlete. He was a reserve gymnast for the Finnish silver medal team at the 1912 Summer Olympics.
