= Kortesjärvi =

- Former municipality
- Kortesjärven kunta Kortesjärvi kommun
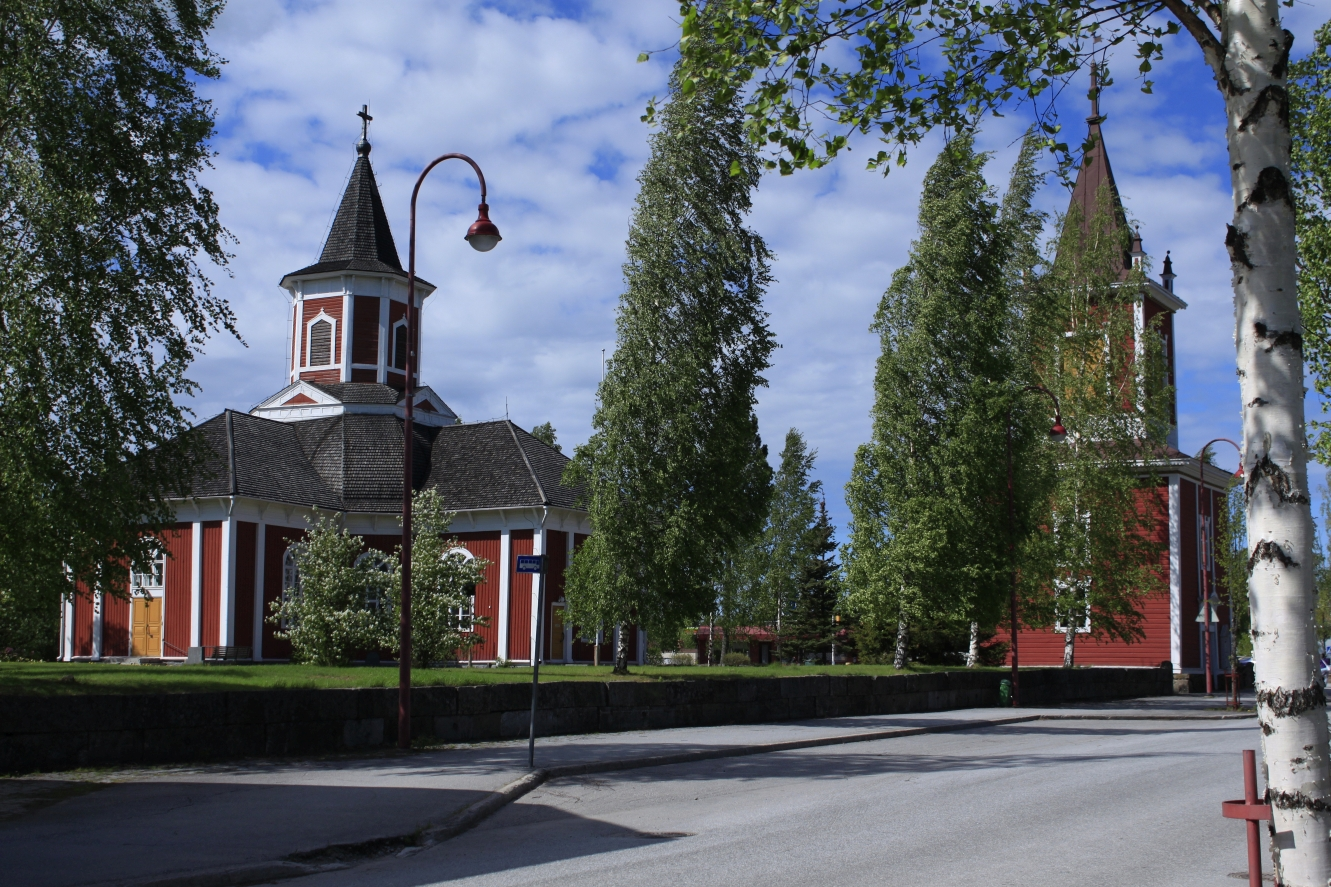
- Kortesjärvi Church

- Coat of arms

- Location of Kortesjärvi in Finland
- Interactive map of Kortesjärvi
- Coordinates: 63°18′N 023°09.5′E
- Country: Finland
- Region: South Ostrobothnia
- Sub-region: Järviseutu sub-region
- Founded: 1865
- Consolidated: 2009

Area
  - Total: 333.51 km^{2} (128.77 sq mi)
  - Land: 323.7 km^{2} (125.0 sq mi)
  - Water: 9.81 km^{2} (3.79 sq mi)

Population (2008-12-31)
  - Total: 2,275
  - Density: 7.028/km^{2} (18.20/sq mi)
- Time zone: UTC+2 (EET)
  - Summer (DST): UTC+3 (EEST)

Kortesjärvi is a former municipality of Finland. It was consolidated, together with Alahärmä and Ylihärmä, to Kauhava on 1 January 2009.

It is located in the province of Western Finland and is part of the South Ostrobothnia region. The municipality had a population of 2,275 (as of 31 December 2008) and covered a land area of 323.70 square kilometres (124.98 sq mi). The population density was 9.81 inhabitants per square kilometre (25.4/sq mi).

The municipality was unilingually Finnish.
