= FC Loviisa =

Finnish football club

- Full name: FC Loviisa
- Founded: 1992
- Ground: Loviisan keskuskenttä, Loviisa, Finland
- Capacity: 500
- Chairman: Niclas Mattsson
- Manager: Joakim Forsström
- Coach: Joni Pertillä; Henrik Nurminen
- League: Nelonen
Home colours

FC Loviisa is a football club from Loviisa, Finland. The club was formed in 1992 and its home ground is at the Loviisan keskuskenttä, which can accommodate 500 spectators.

== Background ==
The club was founded in 1992, following the amalgamation of the Loviisan Tor and Loviisan Riento football sections. Loviisan Tor had the more significant history playing in second tier of the Finnish football system for two seasons in 1939 and 1966 and the third tier for five seasons covering 1974 and the period 1976–79. FC Loviisa played one season in the Kakkonen (Second Division), the third tier, in 1994.

== Season to season ==
Season	Level	Division	Section	Administration	Position	Movements
2002	Tier 5	Nelonen (Fourth Division)	South	South-East Finland (SPL Kaakkois-Suomi)	2nd	Upper Section – 9th
2003	Tier 5	Nelonen (Fourth Division)	West	South-East Finland (SPL Kaakkois-Suomi)	4th	Upper Section – 2nd -Play-offs
2004	Tier 5	Nelonen (Fourth Division)	South	South-East Finland (SPL Kaakkois-Suomi)	2nd	Upper Section – 4th
2005	Tier 5	Nelonen (Fourth Division)		South-East Finland (SPL Kaakkois-Suomi)		Promoted
2006	Tier 4	Kolmonen (Third Division)		South-East Finland (SPL Kaakkois-Suomi)	14th	Relegated
2007	Tier 5	Nelonen (Fourth Division)		South-East Finland (SPL Kaakkois-Suomi)	8th	
2008	Tier 5	Nelonen (Fourth Division)		South-East Finland (SPL Kaakkois-Suomi)	9th	Moved to SPL Uusimaa for 2009.
2009	Tier 7	Kutonen (Sixth Division)	Section 7	Uusimaa District (SPL Uusimaa)	1st	Promoted
2010	Tier 6	Vitonen (Fifth Division)	Section 4	Uusimaa District (SPL Uusimaa)		
2019	Tier 5	Nelonen (Fourth Division)	Section 4	Kaakkois-Suomi (SPL Kaakkois-Suomi)		

- 1 season in Kolmonen
- 2 seasons in Nelonen
- 1 season in Vitonen
- 1 season in Kutonen

== Club structure ==
FC Loviisa runs a number of teams including 1 men's team, 1 ladies' team, 7 boys' teams, and 5 girls' teams. The Club organises an annual soccer school (120 children attended in 2009) and the Fortum Cup junior tournament.

The club is also active in futsal.

== 2019 season ==
FC Loviisa Men's Team is competing in Section 4 (Lohko 4) of the Vitonen administered by the Uusimaa SPL. This is the sixth-highest tier in the Finnish football system. In 2009 the team finished in first place in Section 7 of the Kutonen and was promoted.

== References and sources ==
- Official Website
- Finnish Wikipedia
- Suomen Cup
- FC Loviisa Facebook
