= Kellokoski =

Village in Tuusula, Finland

Coordinates: 60°33′N 25°06′E

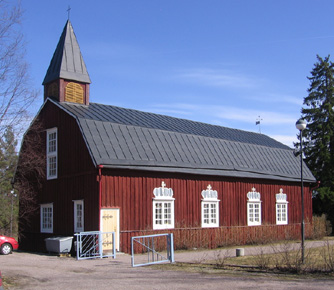
Kellokoski church

Kellokoski (Finnish: [ˈkelːoˌkoski]; Swedish: Mariefors) is one of the three villages in the Finnish municipality of Tuusula. It is located 7 kilometres (4.3 mi) north of the town of Järvenpää. Kellokoski has a population of 4,400.

Kellokoski has its own church, which was built in 1734, and a psychiatric hospital.

Most people speak Finnish. Earlier there were also people who spoke Swedish.

== History ==
Kellokosken ruukki, pig iron factory started 1795. Nowadays, iron products have been replaced with products made from aluminium.

== Notable people from Kellokoski ==
- Antti Nykänen, basketball player
