= FC Espoo =

Finnish football club

- Full name: Football Club Espoo
- Founded: 1989; 36 years ago
- Ground: Leppävaaran stadion Espoo; Finland
- Capacity: 2,800
- Chairman: Jarkko Laaksonen
- Head Coach: Jussi Nuorela
- Coach: Petri "Huso" Godenhjelm (Finland) Petri Ojanperä (GK)
- League: Kolmonen
- 2022: 3rd
Home colours

FC Espoo is a Finnish football club. It was based in the city of Espoo, Finland. Founded in 1989, the first team plays in the Kolmonen, the fourth tier of the Finnish football pyramid. The club is amateur and focuses mainly on junior football sides for youth development.

The first team of FC Espoo plays its home games at Leppävaaran stadion in the district Leppävaara in the Greater Helsinki region.

== Background ==
FC Espoo was founded in 1989 by the Leppävaaran Pallo and FC Kasiysi football clubs based in Espoo who now act as feeder clubs.

The club has played 9 seasons in the Kakkonen (Second Division), the first spell being in 1993 when they were relegated back to the Kolmonen (Third Division) after just one season and the second period being from 2002 until 2009 which culminated with promotion to the Ykkönen (First Division) for the first time.

== Season to season ==
Season	Level	Division	Section	Administration	Position	Movements
2000	Tier 4	Kolmonen (Third Division)	Section 2	Helsinki & Uusimaa (SPL Uusimaa)	3rd	
2001	Tier 4	Kolmonen (Third Division)	Section 2	Helsinki & Uusimaa (SPL Uusimaa)	4th	Promoted
2002	Tier 3	Kakkonen (Second Division)	South Group	Finnish FA (Suomen Palloliitto)	1st	Play-offs
2003	Tier 3	Kakkonen (Second Division)	South Group	Finnish FA (Suomen Palloliitto)	4th	
2004	Tier 3	Kakkonen (Second Division)	South Group	Finnish FA (Suomen Palloliitto)	4th	
2005	Tier 3	Kakkonen (Second Division)	South Group	Finnish FA (Suomen Palloliitto)	3rd	
2006	Tier 3	Kakkonen (Second Division)	Group B	Finnish FA (Suomen Palloliitto)	5th	
2007	Tier 3	Kakkonen (Second Division)	Group B	Finnish FA (Suomen Palloliitto)	6th	
2008	Tier 3	Kakkonen (Second Division)	Group B	Finnish FA (Suomen Palloliitto)	9th	
2009	Tier 3	Kakkonen (Second Division)	Group B	Finnish FA (Suomen Palloliitto)	1st	Promoted
2010	Tier 2	Ykkönen (First Division)		Finnish FA (Suomen Palloliitto)	6th	
2011	Tier 2	Ykkönen (First Division)		Finnish FA (Suomen Palloliitto)	13th	Relegated
2012	Tier 3	Kakkonen (Second Division)	South Group	Finnish FA (Suomen Palloliitto)	10th	Relegated
2013	Tier 4	Kolmonen (Third Division)	Section 2	Uusimaa (SPL Uusimaa)	1st	Promoted
2014	Tier 3	Kakkonen (Second Division)	South Group	Finnish FA (Suomen Palloliitto)	10th	Relegated
2015	Tier 4	Kolmonen (Third Division)	Helsinki/Uusimaa 1	Uusimaa (SPL Uusimaa)	1st	Promoted
2016	Tier 3	Kakkonen (Second Division)	Group B	Finnish FA (Suomen Palloliitto)	4th	
2017	Tier 3	Kakkonen (Second Division)	Group B	Finnish FA (Suomen Palloliitto)		

- 2 season in Ykkönen
- 12 seasons in Kakkonen
- 4 seasons in Kolmonen

== Club structure ==
The club runs a number of teams including 2 men's teams, 2 ladies' teams, FCE Akatemia and 3 other boys' teams and finally 2 girls' teams. A key mission of the club is to "work with Espoo football clubs to provide a first team for them and make it possible for footballers in Espoo to make progress in the sport."

A key operational objective is to provide the local clubs with talented and motivated young players that have had the best possible development opportunities. This is achieved by a high quality coaching, good training conditions and the empowerment of young players. A first team with a young age profile is the key way to support this objective.

Facilities used by the club include:

- Leppävaaran urheilupuisto (Leppävaara Sports Park)
- Laaksolahden kenttä and jalkapallohalli (Laaksolahti Playing Field and Football Hall)
- Keski-Espoon kenttä (Central Espoo Playing Field)

== References and sources ==
- Official Website
- Finnish Wikipedia
- Suomen Cup
- FC Espoo Facebook
