= FC Jyväskylä Blackbird =

Finnish football club

FC Blackbird Jyväskylä
- Full name: FC Blackbird Jyväskylä
- Nickname: Böödi
- Founded: 1996
- Ground: Viitaniemi tekonurmi Jyväskylä; Finland
- Chairman: Nellu Petrescu
- Manager: Harri Huttunen
- League: Kolmonen
- 2024: 9th – Kolmoonen (Group AC)
Home colours

FC Jyväskylä Blackbird (abbreviated FCJ Blackbird or FC Blackbird or FCJ) is a football club from Jyväskylä in Finland. The club was formed in 1996 and their home ground is at the Viitaniemen tekonurmi. The men's first team currently plays in the Kolmonen. The Chairman of FCJ Blackbird is Nellu Petrescu and Harri Huttunen is the Manager.

== Background ==
FCJ Blackbird spent their initial seasons in the Kolmonen (Third Division) of the Finnish football league in the section covering Central Finland (Keski-Suomi). They were promoted to the Kakkonen (Second Division) at the end of the 2007 season. In their first season at the higher level in 2008 they faced an uphill struggle in Group A and just avoided relegation. In 2009 the team were moved to Group C and although they gained less points they were able to finish in ninth position some distance from the relegation spot. The club are now in their third season in the third tier of Finnish football.

== Season to season ==
| Season | Level | Division | Section | Administration | Position | Movements |
|---|---|---|---|---|---|---|
| 2006 | Tier 4 | Kolmonen (Third Division) | | Central Finland(SPL Keski-Suomi) | 1st | Play-offs – Promoted |
| 2007 | Tier 3 | Kakkonen (Second Division) | Group A | Finnish FA (Suomen Pallolitto) | 11th | |
| 2008 | Tier 3 | Kakkonen (Second Division) | Group A | Finnish FA (Suomen Pallolitto) | 11th | |
| 2009 | Tier 3 | Kakkonen (Second Division) | Group C | Finnish FA (Suomen Pallolitto) | 9th | |
| 2010 | Tier 3 | Kakkonen (Second Division) | Group C | Finnish FA (Suomen Pallolitto) | | |

- 4 seasons in Kakkonen
- 1 season in Kolmonen

== Club structure ==
FCJ Blackbird currently has 2 men's teams and 1 boys team. An important initiative of the club is the Nappulaliiga (Little League) Champions for boys and girls of 5 to 10 years of age. The League is targeted towards children who are not involved in football activities and who want to explore the world of football.

== 2010 season ==
FCJ Blackbird Men's Team are competing in Group C (Lohko C) of the Kakkonen (Second Division) administered by the Football Association of Finland (Suomen Palloliitto) . This is the third highest tier in the Finnish football system. In 2009 FC Jyväskylä Blackbird finished in ninth position in their Kakkonen section.

FCJ Blackbird / Mustarastas are a new team participating in Section 2 (Lohko 2) of the Vitonen section administered by the Keski-Suomi SPL.
