= Nelonen (football) =

Nelonen (in Finnish) Fyran (in Swedish)
- Divisions: 14
- Number of clubs: 159
- Level on pyramid: 5 (1973–2023); 6 (2024–)
- Promotion to: Kolmonen
- Relegation to: Vitonen
- Domestic cup: Finnish Cup
- Current: 2024 Nelonen

Nelonen or IV divisioona is the sixth level in the Finnish football league system and comprises 159 teams. The IV divisioona was introduced in 1973 and in the mid-1990s became known as the Nelonen (Number Four in English and Fyran in Swedish). Until the end of 2023, Nelonen was a fifth-highest level in Finnish football league system, but after the formation of the new second-tier Ykkösliiga, Nelonen dropped down one level in pyramid to create a new sixth-tier Nelonen.

== Competition ==
There are 159 clubs in the Nelonen, divided in 14 groups of 9 to 12 teams each representing a geographical area. During the course of a season (starting in April and ending in October) each club normally plays the others twice, once at their home ground and once at that of their opponents. The top team in each Nelonen group is normally promoted to Kolmonen and the two lowest placed teams are normally relegated to the Vitonen.

== Administration ==
=== Football Association of Finland (SPL) ===
The Football Association of Finland (Finnish: Suomen Palloliitto, SPL; Swedish: Finlands Bollförbund, FBF) administers the Nelonen.

Teams within the Nelonen are eligible to compete in the Suomen Cup and the Suomen Regions' Cup. The clubs are normally listed in an abbreviated form and their full names can be viewed by referring to the List of clubs.

== Current clubs - 2012 Season ==
Helsinki: Lohko 1 (Section 1)	Helsinki: Lohko 2 (Section 2)	Uusimaa: Lohko 1 (Section 1)
FC Degis, Laajasalo; FC Kiffen/2, Kruununhaka; FC Kontu/2, Kontula; FC Kuitu, Vuosaari; Gnistan/2, Oulunkylä; HPS/2, Helsinki; Herrasmiehet, Helsinki; LPS/kuninkaat, Laajasalo; MPS/Old Stars, Malmi; PPJ/Akatemia, Lauttasaari; SUMU/77, Suurmetsä; Zenith, Myllypuro	FC ALPC; FC POHU/2; Gnistan/Ogeli; HIFK/2; KäPa/PuLe; PPJ; RoU; SAPA/2; SUMU; Spartak; Tavastia; Töölön Taisto	EBK; EPS; FC Babylon/X; FC Vantaa; FC Västnyland; HC Ränni; KarlU /Biisonit; KyIF; LePa; MasKi; NuPS; Tikka
Uusimaa: Lohko 2 (Section 2)	Kaakkois-Suomi (South-East Finland)	Itä-Suomi (Eastern Finland)
Allianssi Vantaa; FCD; HyPS/02; I-HK/M09; JoKi; Kasiysi/Rocky; OPedot; Pathoven; RiSa; SalReipas/Akatemia; Team Grani; VJS/1	FC PaSa, Imatra; FC Peltirumpu, Kouvola; FC Villisiat, Kouvola; HaPK, Hamina; Kiri, Kotka; KoPa, Lemi; Kultsu FC/2, Lappeenranta; KuP, Punkaharju; LAUTP, Lappeenranta; PEPO/2, Lappeenranta; SiU, Simpele (Rautjärvi); STPS/2, Savonlinna	Hurtat, Lieksa; JoPS /2, Joensuu; JuPS, Juuka; KuKi, Kurkimäki (Kuopio); LehPa, Lehmo (Kontiolahti); LiPa, Kuopio; MPR, Kuopio; PK-37 /2, Iisalmi; SiPS /2, Siilinjärvi; SoU, Sorsakoski (Leppävirta); ToU, Toivala (Siilinjärvi); Yllätys, Ylämylly (Liperi)
Keski-Suomi (Central)	Pohjois-Suomi (Northern Finland): Lappi (Lapland)	Pohjois-Suomi (Northern Finland): Oulu
FC Keitelejazz; FC Villiketut; FCK; FP JKL; HPP; JIlves II; KaPa-51; KeuPa; LPK; SäyRi; Souls AC	FC Kemi Akatemia, Kemi; FC Lynx A, Rovaniemi; FC Muurola 2, Rovaniemi; KemPa, Keminmaa; KiPS, Kittilä; Kolarin Kontio, Kolari; PaPa, Kolari; SoPa, Sodankylä; ToTa, Tornio	Ajax Sarkkiranta; AS Moon; FC Kurenpojat; FC Nets; HauPa 2; MuhU; OTP; OuJK; OuRe; PaKa
Keski-Pohjanmaa (Central Ostrobothnia)	Vaasa	Satakunta
Esse IK; FC YPA II; HBK; IK Myran; K-Pallo; KPV Akatemia; LoVe; NIK; No Stars; PeFF; Sääripotku; TUS	ABC; FC Kuffen; Kaskö IK; KoFF /PeIK; Kungliga Wasa C.F.; Luja; Malax IF; Närpes Kraft /2; Ponnistus; Sisu-Pallo; SuSi Young Boys; VPS-j	EuPa2; FC Ulvila; Koitto; LLuja; LuVe; MuSa4; Nasta; P-Iirot Reservi; PTU
Tampere	Turku and Ahvenanmaa (Turku and Åland)	
FJK; Jags; KaVo; Kristallipalatsi; LaVe; Loiske; NePa; ParVi; PP-70; TP-49; VaKP; YlöR	FC Inter 2; HammIK; Hot Lips; Lieto; MaPS 2; MynPa; PiPS; SaTo; SCR; TPK 2; TuWe; UPK	

== Seasons - League Tables ==
1970s:				1973	1974	1975	1976	1977	1978	1979
1980s:	1980	1981	1982	1983	1984	1985	1986	1987	1988	1989
1990s:	1990	1991	1992	1993	1994	1995	1996	1997	1998	1999
2000s:	2000	2001	2002	2003	2004	2005	2006	2007	2008	2009
2010s:	2010	2011	2012	2013	2014	2015	2016	2017	2018	2019
2020s:	2020	2021	2022	2023	2024	2025				

== References and sources ==
- Finnish FA
- ResultCode
- Nelonen (jalkapallo) - Finnish Wikipedia
