= Mikko Isokangas =

Finnish football manager (born 1980)

Personal information
- Date of birth: 20 May 1980 (age 46)
- Place of birth: Haukipudas, Finland
- Position: Midfielder

Team information
- Current team: AC Oulu (manager)

Youth career
- HauPa

Senior career*
Years	Team	Apps	(Gls)
- HauPa
- TP-47

Managerial career
- 2016–2018: HauPa
- 2018: Hercules (assistant)
- 2018: AC Oulu (assistant)
- 2019–2021: Hercules
- 2023–2024: OLS
- 2023–2024: AC Oulu (assistant)
- 2024–: AC Oulu
- * Club domestic league appearances and goals as of 16 September 2024

Mikko Isokangas (born 20 May 1980) is a Finnish football coach and a former player, who played as a midfielder. He is currently a manager of Veikkausliiga club AC Oulu.

== Playing career ==
Isokangas has played mainly in the lower divisions in the Finnish football league system. He has made 16 appearances in the second-tier Ykkönen for TP-47. He played his last competitive match to this day in the fourth-tier Kolmonen with HauPa in October 2022. Isokangas has also won the Golden Boot in the sixth-tier Vitonen in 2016.

== Coaching career ==
In 2008, while still playing, Isokangas started working as the youth director of his hometown club Haukiputaan Pallo (HauPa). Later he also worked as a youth coach for the club. During 2013–2015, Isokangas coached in the youth sectors of FC Espoo and Kasiysi.

For the 2016 season, he returned to Haukipudas and was named a head coach of HauPa. Since 2018, he worked for Tervarit and was the head coach of the club's first team Hercules. Simultaneously he worked as an assistant of the AC Oulu first team in the second-tier Ykkönen in 2018, with head coach Mika Lähderinne. He left Tervarit and Hercules after the 2021 season.

In September 2022, Isokangas was named the head coach of Oulun Luistinseura (OLS), the reserve team of AC Oulu, starting in the 2023 season. One year later, his contract was extended for the 2024 season, after he had helped the team to qualify for the 2024 Ykkönen.

In June 2024, after AC Oulu had fired its whole first team coaching staff, Isokangas was named an interim manager with Rafinha. They helped the club to advance to the round of 16 of the 2024 Finnish Cup, and get an away draw against Vaasan Palloseura (VPS) in the league. In September 2024, after AC Oulu had fired their new coach Kostas Bratsos due to three consecutive red cards, Isokangas was named the caretaker manager of the first team for the remainder of the 2024 season. Rafinha joined him as an assistant coach again. He managed AC Oulu to finish 9th in the league and to defend its spot in Veikkausliiga. In November 2024, Isokangas was selected for the UEFA Pro coaching class by Football Association of Finland. Simultaneously he was named the manager of AC Oulu on a two-year deal with a two-year option.

== Honours ==
- Veikkausliiga Manager of the Month: May 2026
- Northern Finland Football Association: Manager of the Year 2024
