= Julius Körkkö =

Finnish footballer (born 2006)

Personal information
- Date of birth: 3 July 2006 (age 20)
- Place of birth: Haukipudas, Finland
- Height: 1.85 m (6 ft 1 in)
- Positions: Forward; midfielder

Team information
- Current team: Horsens
- Number: 18

Youth career
- HauPa
- Tervarit

Senior career*
Years	Team	Apps	(Gls)
2023	Tervarit	5	(1)
2023	JS Hercules	15	(2)
2024–2026	AC Oulu	54	(14)
2024–2025	→ OLS (loan)	9	(3)
2026–	Horsens	0	(0)

International career^{‡}
2022	Finland U16	3	(0)
2022–2023	Finland U17	8	(2)
2024	Finland U18	1	(0)
2025	Finland U19	1	(0)
2026–	Finland U21	2	(1)
- * Club domestic league appearances and goals as of 30 June 2026 ‡ National team caps and goals as of 30 June 2026

Julius Körkkö (born 3 July 2006) is a Finnish professional footballer who plays as a forward for Danish Superliga club AC Horsens.

== Club career ==
Körkkö played in the youth sectors of HauPa and Tervarit in Oulu, before he joined JS Hercules in the third-tier Kakkonen in 2023, at the age of 16. In his early teens, he also spent time with a youth team of Italian club Venezia.

=== AC Oulu ===
On 13 November 2023, Körkkö signed a professional contract with Veikkausliiga side AC Oulu, on a two-year deal with an option for an additional year. Körkkö debuted with his new club on 3 February 2024, in a 2–0 Finnish League Cup win against SJK. On 24 May 2024, Körkkö scored his first goal in the league, in a 4–3 away defeat against Haka. During his first season in Finnish first tier, Körkkö made 19 appearances and scored three goals.

=== AC Horsens ===
On 13 July 2026, Körkkö signed with Danish Superliga club AC Horsens, for a reported transfer fee of €600,000.

== International career ==
Körkkö has represented Finland at under-16 and under-17 youth national team levels.

== Career statistics ==
As of 30 June 2026

Appearances and goals by club, season and competition
Club	Season	League			National cup (Note: Includes Suomen Cup)		League cup (Note: Includes Finnish League Cup)		Europe		Total	
Club	Season	Division	Apps	Goals	Apps	Goals	Apps	Goals	Apps	Goals	Apps	Goals
Tervarit	2023	Kolmonen	5	1	—		—		—		5	1
Hercules	2023	Kakkonen	15	2	1	0	—		—		16	2
AC Oulu	2024	Veikkausliiga	19	3	5	1	4	0	—		28	4
AC Oulu	2025	Veikkausliiga	22	6	6	1	2	0	–		30	7
AC Oulu	2026	Veikkausliiga	13	5	1	0	7	3	–		21	8
AC Oulu	Total		54	14	12	2	13	3	0	0	79	19
OLS (loan)	2024	Ykkönen	5	3	—		—		—		5	3
OLS (loan)	2025	Ykkönen	4	0	—		—		—		4	0
OLS (loan)	Total		9	3	0	0	0	0	0	0	9	3
AC Horsens	2026–27	Danish Superliga	0	0	0	0	–		–		0	0
Career total			83	16	13	2	13	3	0	0	109	25

== Honours ==
- Northern Finland Football Association: Boy Player of the Year 2024
