= Luquinhas (footballer, born 1997) =

Brazilian footballer (born 1997)

Personal information
- Full name: Claudio Lucas Morais Ferreira dos Santos
- Date of birth: 22 April 1997 (age 29)
- Place of birth: Brazil
- Height: 1.75 m (5 ft 9 in)
- Position: Winger

Team information
- Current team: Persita Tangerang
- Number: 97

Senior career*
Years	Team	Apps	(Gls)
2017	Tigres do Brasil	7	(1)
2018–2019	Kongsvinger	2	(0)
2018–2019	Kongsvinger 2	14	(10)
2020–2022	Gnistan	39	(9)
2022–2023	AC Oulu	39	(4)
2024	Amazonas	0	(0)
2024	Lahti	14	(2)
2025	Skënderbeu	16	(1)
2025–2026	PSBS Biak	31	(7)
2026–	Persita Tangerang	7	(2)
- * Club domestic league appearances and goals as of 31 October 2026

Claudio Lucas Morais Ferreira dos Santos (born 22 April 1997), commonly known as Luquinhas, is a Brazilian professional footballer who plays as a winger for Super League club Persita Tangerang.

== Career ==
After starting in his native Brazil with Tigres do Brasil, Luquinhas has played in Norwegian second-tier with Kongsvinger and in Finnish second-tier with Gnistan.

On 28 July 2022, he signed with Veikkausliiga club AC Oulu, following his former Gnistan coach Ricardo Duarte.

On 3 January 2024, Luquinhas returned to Brazil after signing with Série B club Amazonas.

On 1 July 2024, Luquinhas returned to Finland after signing with FC Lahti, following his former coach Duarte again. He left the club after the relegation.

In January 2025, he joined Skënderbeu.

== Career statistics ==
As of 31 October 2026

Appearances and goals by club, season and competition
Club	Season	League			State league		National cup (Note: Includes Norwegian Cup, Suomen Cup, Copa do Brasil, Albanian Cup)		League cup (Note: Includes Finnish League Cup and Copa Verde)		Total	
Club	Season	Division	Apps	Goals	Apps	Goals	Apps	Goals	Apps	Goals	Apps	Goals
Tigres do Brasil	2017	Campeonato Carioca			7	1	–		–		7	1
Kongsvinger	2018	1. divisjon	0	0	–		0	0	–		0	0
Kongsvinger	2019	1. divisjon	2	0	–		2	0	–		4	0
Kongsvinger	Total		2	0	–	–	2	0	–	–	4	0
Kongsvinger 2	2018	4. divisjon	4	6	–		–		–		4	6
Kongsvinger 2	2019	3. divisjon	10	4	–		–		–		10	4
Kongsvinger 2	Total		14	10	–	–	–	–	–	–	14	10
Gnistan	2020	Ykkönen	13	6	–		0	0	–		13	6
Gnistan	2021	Ykkönen	12	0	–		3	1	–		15	1
Gnistan	2022	Ykkönen	14	3	–		2	0	–		16	3
Gnistan	Total		39	9	–	–	5	1	–	–	44	10
AC Oulu	2022	Veikkausliiga	12	2	–		–		–		12	2
AC Oulu	2023	Veikkausliiga	27	2	–		5	0	7	1	39	3
AC Oulu	Total		39	4	–	–	5	0	7	1	51	5
Amazonas	2024	Série B	0	0	0	0	0	0	1	0	1	0
Lahti	2024	Veikkausliiga	14	2	–		0	0	0	0	14	2
Skënderbeu	2024–25	Kategoria Superiore	16	1	–		2	0	–		18	1
PSBS Biak	2025–26	Super League	31	7	–		0	0	–		31	7
Persita Tangerang	2026–27	Super League	7	2	0	0	0	0	0	0	7	2
Career total			162	35	7	1	14	1	8	1	191	38
