= Yobe (disambiguation) =

Yobe State is located in Northeast Nigeria.

Yobe may also refer to:

- Yobe Desert Stars, an association football club based in Damaturu, Yobe State
- Yobe language, a Gur language of Benin and Togo
- Yobe River, a river in West Africa that flows into Lake Chad through Nigeria and Niger
- Yobe State University, Damaturu, Yobe State
- Yobe Station, a train station in the city of Himeji, Hyōgo Prefecture, Japan
- Dominic Yobe (born 1986), Zambian footballer
- Donewell Yobe (born 1983), Zambian former footballer
- McDonald Yobe (born 1981), retired Malawian footballer

== See also ==
- 2014 Yobe State attacks
- Yobe State school shooting, of 2013 in Mamudo, Yobe State
- Yobes Ondieki (born 1961), Kenyan former 5000 m runner
