= Iiro (name) =

- Gender: Male
- Name day: 19 December (Finland)

Iiro is a Finnish masculine given name. Notable people with the given name include:

- Iiro Aalto (born 1977), Finnish footballer
- Iiro Järvi (born 1965), Finnish ice hockey player
- Iiro Järvinen (born 1996), Finnish footballer
- Iiro Luoto (born 1984), Finnish gridiron football player
- Iiro Mendolin (born 2006), Finnish footballer
- Iiro Pakarinen (born 1991), Finnish ice hockey player
- Iiro Rantala (born 1970), Finnish pianist
- Iiro Seppänen (born 1975), Finnish producer and author
- Iiro Sopanen (born 1989), Finnish ice hockey player
- Iiro Tarkki (born 1985), Finnish ice hockey player
- Iiro Vanha (born 1994), Finnish futsal player
- Iiro Viinanen (born 1944), Finnish politician
