= Jussi-Pekka Savolainen =

Finnish footballer (born 1986)

Personal information
- Date of birth: 25 June 1986 (age 40)
- Place of birth: Rauma, Finland
- Height: 1.73 m (5 ft 8 in)
- Position: Midfielder

Team information
- Current team: Pallo-Iirot
- Number: 10

Senior career*
Years	Team	Apps	(Gls)
2004–2007	Tampere United	35	(0)
2008–2009	KuPS	46	(3)
2010	VPS	23	(2)
2011–2014	Pallo-Iirot	56	(19)

International career
- Finland U17

Managerial career
- 2015–2021: KäPa (youth)
- 2020–2021: KäPa (coaching director)
- 2023: AC Oulu (assistant)
- 2023: AC Oulu (interim)
- 2024–: Inter Turku II
- * Club domestic league appearances and goals as of 26 November 2021

Jussi-Pekka Savolainen (born 25 June 1986) is a Finnish football coach and former footballer who played as a midfielder. He is currently working as the head coach of Inter Turku II reserve team in Kakkonen.

== Career ==
- 33 games, no goals. Tampere United, Finland (Veikkausliiga, 2004–2007)
  - Won two Finnish Championships with Tampere United (2006 and 2007)
- Pallo-Iirot, Finland (Juniors)
  - 37 caps for Finnish boys national football team

== International career ==
Savolainen is a left-sided attacking midfield player. He represented Finland at under-17 level and played for them in the 2003 FIFA U-17 World Championship, which were held in Finland.

== Coaching career ==
Savolainen worked as a youth coach of Käpylän Pallo (KäPa) in various age brackets from 2015 to 2021. He was also the coaching director of the club in 2020–2021. After the 2021 season, he announced that he would spend the next season on study leave.

He was named an assistant coach of Veikkausliiga side AC Oulu on 11 November 2022. After the sacking of Ricardo Duarte in August 2023, Savolainen was named the interim head coach of the club with Rauno Ojanen for the rest of the season.

On 30 November 2023, Savolainen was appointed the head coach of Inter Turku II reserve team in Kakkonen.

== Personal life ==
Savolainen has also written books about football.

== Career statistics ==
As of 23 September 2024.

Appearances and goals by club, season and competition
Club	Season	League			Cup		League cup		Europe		Total	
Club	Season	Division	Apps	Goals	Apps	Goals	Apps	Goals	Apps	Goals	Apps	Goals
Tampere United	2004	Veikkausliiga	14	0	–		–		1 (Note: Appearance(s) in UEFA Intertoto Cup)	0	15	0
Tampere United	2005	Veikkausliiga	3	0	–		–		–		3	0
Tampere United	2006	Veikkausliiga	16	0	–		–		4	1	20	1
Tampere United	2007	Veikkausliiga	1	0	–		–		0	0	1	0
Tampere United	Total		34	0	0	0	0	0	5	1	39	1
FC Hämeenlinna (loan)	2006	Ykkönen	1	0	–		–		–		1	0
KuPS	2008	Veikkausliiga	28	3	–		–		–		28	3
KuPS	2009	Veikkausliiga	20	0	1	0	6	3	–		27	3
KuPS	Total		48	3	1	0	6	3	0	0	55	6
VPS	2010	Veikkausliiga	23	2	2	0	–		–		25	2
Pallo-Iirot	2011	Kakkonen	8	2	–		–		–		8	2
Pallo-Iirot	2012	Kakkonen	20	9	–		–		–		20	9
Pallo-Iirot	2013	Kakkonen	24	6	–		–		–		24	6
Pallo-Iirot	2014	Kakkonen	3	2	–		–		–		3	2
Pallo-Iirot	Total		55	19	0	0	0	0	0	0	55	19
Career total			161	24	3	0	6	3	5	1	175	28

== Honours ==
Tampere United

- Veikkausliiga: 2006, 2007
