= Sani Kaita =

Nigerian footballer (born 1986)

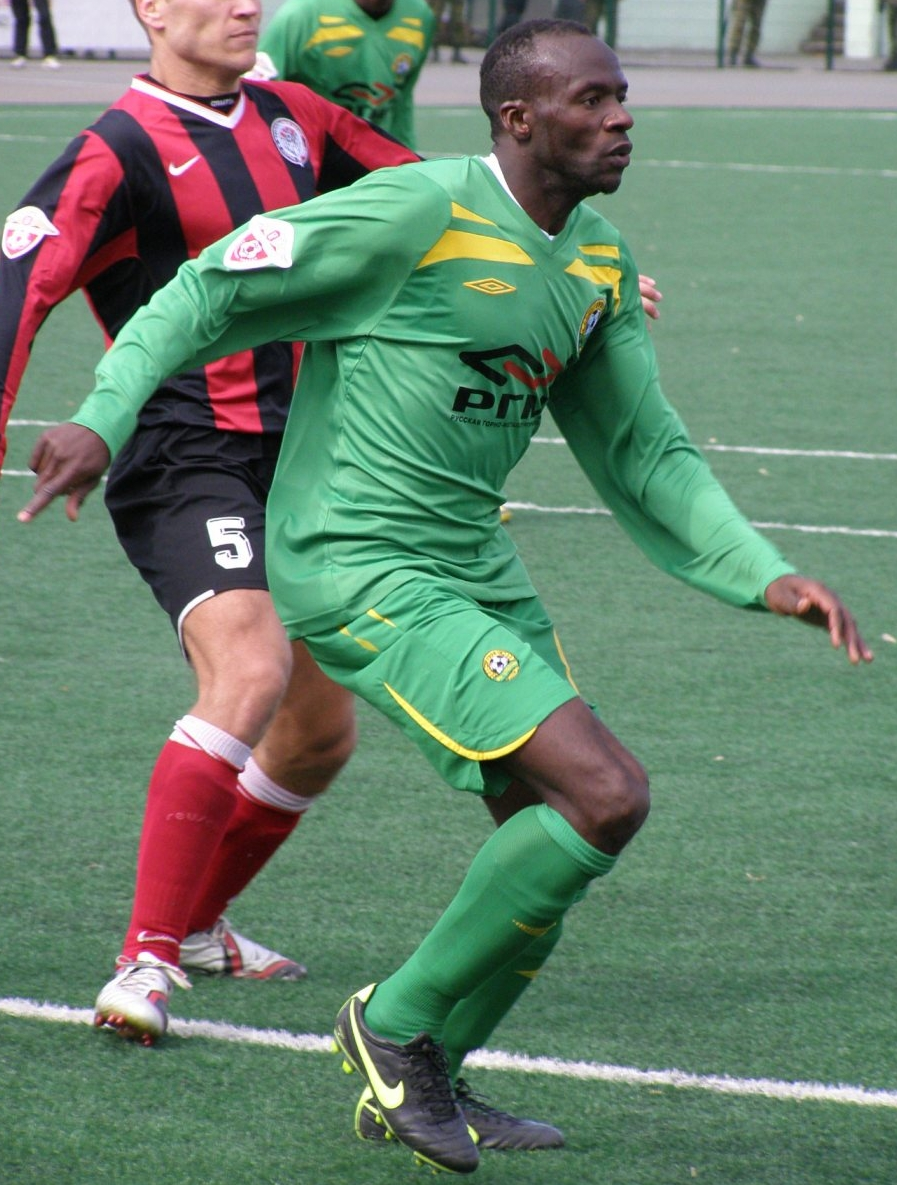
- Kaita with Kuban Krasnodar in 2009

Personal information
- Full name: Sani Haruna Kaita
- Date of birth: 2 May 1986 (age 40)
- Place of birth: Kano, Nigeria
- Height: 1.79 m (5 ft 10 in)
- Position: Defensive midfielder

Youth career
- –2003: Kano Pillars

Senior career*
Years	Team	Apps	(Gls)
2004–2005	Kano Pillars		
2005–2008	Sparta Rotterdam	22	(0)
2008–2011	Monaco	3	(0)
2009	→ Kuban Krasnodar (loan)	17	(0)
2009	→ Lokomotiv Moscow (loan)	3	(0)
2010	→ Alania Vladikavkaz (loan)	6	(0)
2010	→ Metalist Kharkiv (loan)	6	(0)
2011	→ Iraklis (loan)	6	(0)
2011–2012	Tavriya Simferopol	7	(0)
2012–2013	Olympiakos Nicosia	2	(0)
2014	Enyimba	1	(1)
2014	Saxan	12	(0)
2015	Ifeanyi Ubah	4	(0)
2016	JS Hercules	7	(0)
2017	Rovaniemen Palloseura	11	(1)

International career
2005–2010	Nigeria	22	(0)
Medal record
Representing Nigeria
Men's Football
Silver medal – second place	2008 Beijing	Team competition
- * Club domestic league appearances and goals

Sani Haruna Kaita (born 2 May 1986) is a Nigerian former professional footballer who played as a defensive midfielder.

== Club career ==
Kaita was born in Kano, Nigeria. He joined Sparta Rotterdam in the 2005–06 season from Kano Pillars FC. Kaita moved to AS Monaco FC in September 2008.

Kaita left Monaco on 13 January 2009 and joined FC Kuban Krasnodar on loan through 31 December 2009. On 25 August 2009, he signed for Lokomotiv Moscow on loan from Monaco until December. On 25 February 2010 Alania Vladikavkaz signed the midfielder on loan. On 31 May 2010 FC Metalist Kharkiv signed Kaita on loan. On the last day of the 2011 winter transfer window, Kaita moved to Super League Greece side Iraklis on a six-month loan deal.

In April 2014, Kaita was back in Nigeria training with Enyimba F.C. He made his debut against Sharks F.C. on 7 May and spent a three-month loan with the Aba side. The loan was part of the League Management Company's elite initiative for foreign based professionals. He signed for Ifeanyi Ubah in the Nigeria premier league for the season 2015, but played only few matches for the team.

In 2016, he joined a Finnish club, JS Hercules, which was coached by his former national team coach Daniel Amokachi.

For the 2017 season, Kaita signed for Veikkausliiga team RoPS. He made his debut for the team on 28 January 2017 in a Suomen Cup 3–0 win against HauPa. He scored his first goal on 22 April against Ilves Tampere in the 79th minute, after being brought in three minutes earlier for injured team captain Antti Okkonen. At the end of the year he was released after featuring sporadically in the second half of the season. After the season, his signing was publicly called a poor bargain by club president Risto Niva.

== International career ==
Kaita caught the eye of Sparta when playing all seven matches for Nigeria U-20 at the 2005 FIFA U-20 World Cup in the Netherlands.

He was also a member of the senior Nigeria national team making his debut in a 3–0 friendly loss against Romania in November 2005. Kaita was sent off in a match against Greece on 17 June 2010, in their second 2010 FIFA World Cup match for kicking Vasilis Torosidis. This made him the first Nigerian player to be sent off in a World Cup match. Greece went on to score their first World Cup goals, and win their first match in the World Cup.

== Honours ==
Nigeria

- African Cup of Nations: bronze medalist 2006, 2010
- Olympic Games: runner-up 2008

Nigeria U20

- FIFA U-20 World Cup: runner-up 2005
