= Onni Tiihonen =

Finnish footballer (born 2000)

Personal information
- Full name: Onni Jalmari Tiihonen
- Date of birth: 6 June 2000 (age 26)
- Place of birth: Vantaa, Finland
- Height: 1.83 m (6 ft 0 in)
- Position: Central midfielder

Team information
- Current team: AC Oulu
- Number: 17

Youth career
- –2014: KOPSE
- 2015: Legirus Inter
- 2016–2017: PK-35
- 2017: PK Keski-Uusimaa

Senior career*
Years	Team	Apps	(Gls)
2018–2021	Gnistan	61	(1)
2018	→ Gnistan II	2	(1)
2020	→ NJS (loan)	1	(0)
2020	→ PK Keski-Uusimaa (loan)	6	(1)
2022	AB Argir	14	(0)
2022–2023	Viitorul Dăești	1	(1)
2023	ASU Politehnica Timișoara	8	(0)
2023–2024	Viitorul Târgu Jiu	24	(1)
2024	Unirea Ungheni	10	(0)
2025–	AC Oulu	18	(1)
- * Club domestic league appearances and goals as of 20 November 2025

Onni Jalmari Tiihonen (born 6 June 2000) is a Finnish professional footballer who plays as a central midfielder for Veikkausliiga club AC Oulu.

== Club career ==
Tiihonen started his senior career with IF Gnistan in 2018. He played with the club in the third-tier Kakkonen and in the second-tier Ykkönen after the promotion. Tiihonen was loaned out to his former youth club PKKU in 2020.

After a short stint with AB Argir in the Faroe Islands Premier League in 2022, Tiihonen moved to Romania.

In July 2023, Tiihonen signed with Viitorul Târgu Jiu in Romanian second-tier Liga II.

For the 2024–25 season, he joined a newly promoted Liga II club Unirea Ungheni.

On 9 November 2024, Tiihonen left Unirea Ungheni due to unpaid salaries, and signed with Veikkausliiga club AC Oulu on a one-year deal with a one-year option.

== Career statistics ==
As of 16 July 2025

Appearances and goals by club, season and competition
Club	Season	League			Cup (Note: Includes Suomen Cup, Faroe Islands Cup and Cupa României)		Other		Total	
Club	Season	Division	Apps	Goals	Apps	Goals	Apps	Goals	Apps	Goals
Gnistan II	2018	Nelonen	2	1	–		–		2	1
Gnistan	2018	Kakkonen	16	1	4	0	–		20	1
Gnistan	2019	Kakkonen	15	0	1	0	4 (Note: Includes Kakkonen Cup)	0	20	0
Gnistan	2020	Ykkönen	6	0	5	1	–		11	1
Gnistan	2021	Ykkönen	24	0	4	1	–		28	1
Gnistan	Total		61	1	14	2	4	0	79	3
NJS (loan)	2020	Kakkonen	1	0	–		–		1	0
PKKU (loan)	2020	Kakkonen	6	1	–		–		6	1
AB Argir	2022	Faroe Islands Premier League	14	0	2	0	–		16	0
Viitorul Dăești	2022–23	Liga III	1	1	0	0	–		1	1
ASU Politehnica Timișoara	2022–23	Liga II	8	0	–		–		8	0
Viitorul Târgu Jiu	2023–24	Liga II	24	1	1	0	–		25	1
Unirea Ungheni	2024–25	Liga II	10	0	4	0	–		14	0
AC Oulu	2025	Veikkausliiga	13	0	4	0	0	0	17	0
Career total			140	5	25	2	4	0	169	7

== Honours ==
Gnistan

- Kakkonen: 2019
