= Sopanen =

Sopanen is a Finnish surname. Notable people with the surname include:

- Elias Sopanen (1863–1926), Finnish judge, farmer and politician
- Vili Sopanen (born 1987), Finnish professional ice hockey player
- Iiro Sopanen (born 1989), Finnish professional ice hockey forward
- Eetu Sopanen (born 1996), Finnish ice hockey defenceman
- Teija Sopanen, Finnish beauty queen
