= Eemil Merikanto =

Finnish footballer (born 2005)

Personal information
- Date of birth: 3 August 2005 (age 21)
- Place of birth: Oulu, Finland
- Height: 1.87 m (6 ft 2 in)
- Position: Attacking midfielder

Team information
- Current team: OLS
- Number: 45

Youth career
- –2019: HauPa
- 2019–2023: OLS

Senior career*
Years	Team	Apps	(Gls)
2023–	OLS	92	(26)
2024–	AC Oulu	4	(0)
- * Club domestic league appearances and goals as of 7 November 2026

Eemil Merikanto (born 3 August 2005) is a Finnish professional footballer who plays as an attacking midfielder for Ykkönen club Oulun Luistinseura (OLS).

== Club career ==
On 13 November 2024, Merikanto extended his contract with AC Oulu on a two-year deal with a one-year option.

== Career statistics ==
As of 7 November 2026

Appearances and goals by club, season and competition
Club	Season	League			Cup (Note: Includes Suomen Cup)		League cup		Europe		Total	
Club	Season	Division	Apps	Goals	Apps	Goals	Apps	Goals	Apps	Goals	Apps	Goals
OLS	2023	Kakkonen	21	6	2	1	–		–		23	7
OLS	2024	Ykkönen	22	9	2	0	–		–		24	9
OLS	2025	Ykkönen	23	3	0	0	–		–		23	3
OLS	2026	Ykkönen	26	8	1	0	–		–		27	8
OLS	Total		92	26	5	1	0	0	0	0	97	27
OsPa	2024	Kolmonen	5	1	–		–		–		5	1
AC Oulu	2024	Veikkausliiga	4	0	–		–		–		4	0
AC Oulu	2025	Veikkausliiga	0	0	2	0	5	0	–		7	0
AC Oulu	Total		9	1	2	0	5	0	0	0	16	1
Career total			101	27	7	1	5	0	0	0	113	28
