= Heinäpää Football Stadium =

Football stadium in Oulu, Finland

- Heinäpään jalkapallostadion
- OTC Stadion
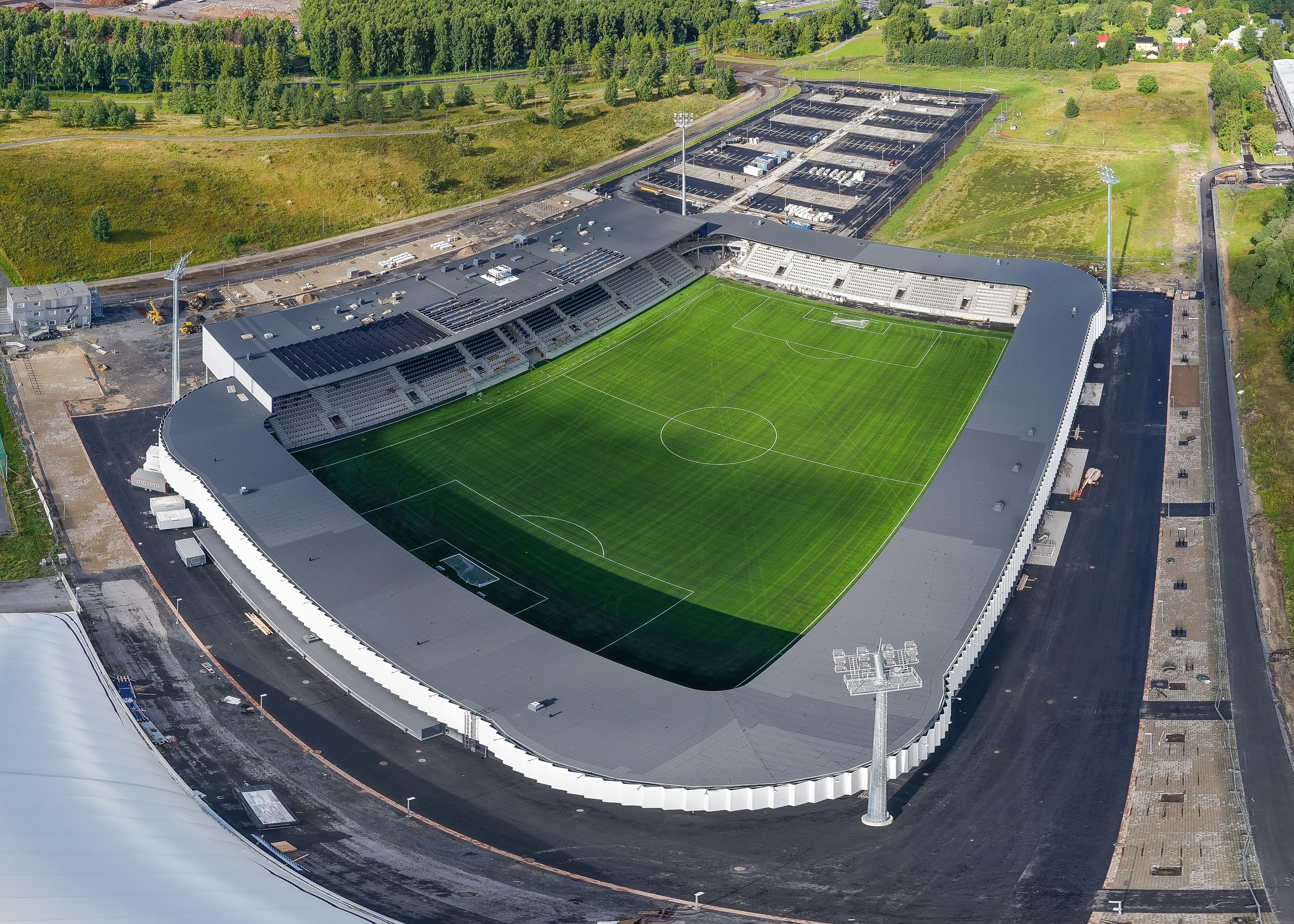
- Interactive map of Heinäpää Football Stadium
- Address: Nuottasaarentie 20, 90400 Oulu
- Location: Nuottasaari, Oulu, Finland
- Coordinates: 65°00′04″N 025°27′05″E
- Owner: OTC Stadion
- Capacity: 5,080 (association football matches); 9,000 (concerts)
- Type: Stadium
- Events: Association football matches; concerts
- Field size: 105 × 68 m

Construction
- Built: 24 June 2025 – 27 August 2026
- Opened: 5 September 2026
- Cost: EUR 23.7 million
- Builder: Temotek

Tenant
- AC Oulu (Veikkausliiga) 2026–

Website
- otcstadion.fi

Heinäpää Football Stadium (Finnish: Heinäpään jalkapallostadion or OTC Stadion) is an association football stadium in Oulu, Finland built in 2025–2026. It is the home stadium of AC Oulu of the Veikkausliiga. The all-seater UEFA category 3 stadium has a capacity of 5,080 spectators.
