= Janne Hietanen =

Finnish footballer (born 1978)

Personal information
- Full name: Janne Tapani Hietanen
- Date of birth: 2 June 1978 (age 48)
- Place of birth: Oulu, Finland
- Height: 1.82 m (6 ft 0 in)
- Position: Defender

Youth career
- 1989–1995: OTP

Senior career*
Years	Team	Apps	(Gls)
1996	OTP	20	(4)
1997	FC Jazz	23	(1)
1998–1999	IFK Norrköping	2	(0)
2000–2001	VPS	64	(3)
2002–2004	Denizlispor	28	(1)
2004	Las Palmas	11	(0)
2005	Tromsø	11	(0)
2005–2006	Córdoba	11	(0)
2006–2007	AC Oulu	49	(9)
2008	Troyes	6	(0)
2008–2009	Roeselare	14	(2)
2010–2015	AC Oulu	147	(13)
2014	FC Santa Claus		

International career
1995	Finland U17	5	(0)
1997–1999	Finland U21	19	(1)
2000–2005	Finland	16	(0)
- * Club domestic league appearances and goals

Janne Tapani Hietanen (born 2 June 1978 in Oulu) is a Finnish former professional footballer who played as a defender.

== Career statistics ==
As of 1 September 2024.

Appearances and goals by club, season and competition
Club	Season	League			Cup (Note: Includes Suomen Cup)		Europe		Total	
Club	Season	Division	Apps	Goals	Apps	Goals	Apps	Goals	Apps	Goals
OTP	1996	Kakkonen	20	4	–		–		20	4
Jazz	1997	Veikkausliiga	23	1	–		4 (Note: Appearances in UEFA Champions League and UEFA Cup)	0	27	1
IFK Norrköping	1998	Allsvenskan	2	0	–		–		2	0
IFK Norrköping	1999	Allsvenskan	0	0	–		–		0	0
IFK Norrköping	Total		2	0	0	0	0	0	2	0
VPS	2000	Veikkausliiga	33	0	–		–		33	0
VPS	2001	Veikkausliiga	31	0	–		–		31	0
VPS	Total		64	0	0	0	0	0	64	0
Denizlispor	2001–02	Süper Lig	14	0	1	0	–		15	0
Denizlispor	2002–03	Süper Lig	14	0	2	0	6 (Note: Appearances in UEFA Cup)	0	22	0
Denizlispor	2003–04	Süper Lig	0	0	0	0	–		0	0
Denizlispor	Total		28	0	3	0	6	0	37	0
Las Palmas	2003–04	Segunda División	11	0	–		–		11	0
Las Palmas	2004–05	Segunda División B	0	0	–		–		0	0
Las Palmas	Total		11	0	0	0	0	0	11	0
Tromsø	2005	Tippeligaen	11	0	3	0	0	0	14	0
Córdoba	2005–06	Segunda División B	6	0	–		–		6	0
AC Oulu	2006	Ykkönen	24	4	–		–		24	4
AC Oulu	2007	Veikkausliiga	25	5	–		–		25	5
AC Oulu	Total		49	9	0	0	0	0	49	9
Troyes	2007–08	Ligue 2	6	0	–		–		6	0
Roeselare	2008–09	Belgian First Division	14	2	0	0	–		14	2
AC Oulu	2010	Veikkausliiga	24	2	–		–		24	2
AC Oulu	2011	Ykkönen	24	2	2	0	–		26	2
AC Oulu	2012	Ykkönen	25	3	2	0	–		27	3
AC Oulu	2013	Ykkönen	26	2	1	0	–		27	2
AC Oulu	2014	Ykkönen	24	3	2	0	–		26	3
AC Oulu	2015	Ykkönen	23	1	5	0	–		28	1
AC Oulu	Total		144	13	12	0	0	0	156	13
Career total			378	29	18	0	10	0	406	29
