= Rafinha (footballer, born 1982) =

Brazilian footballer

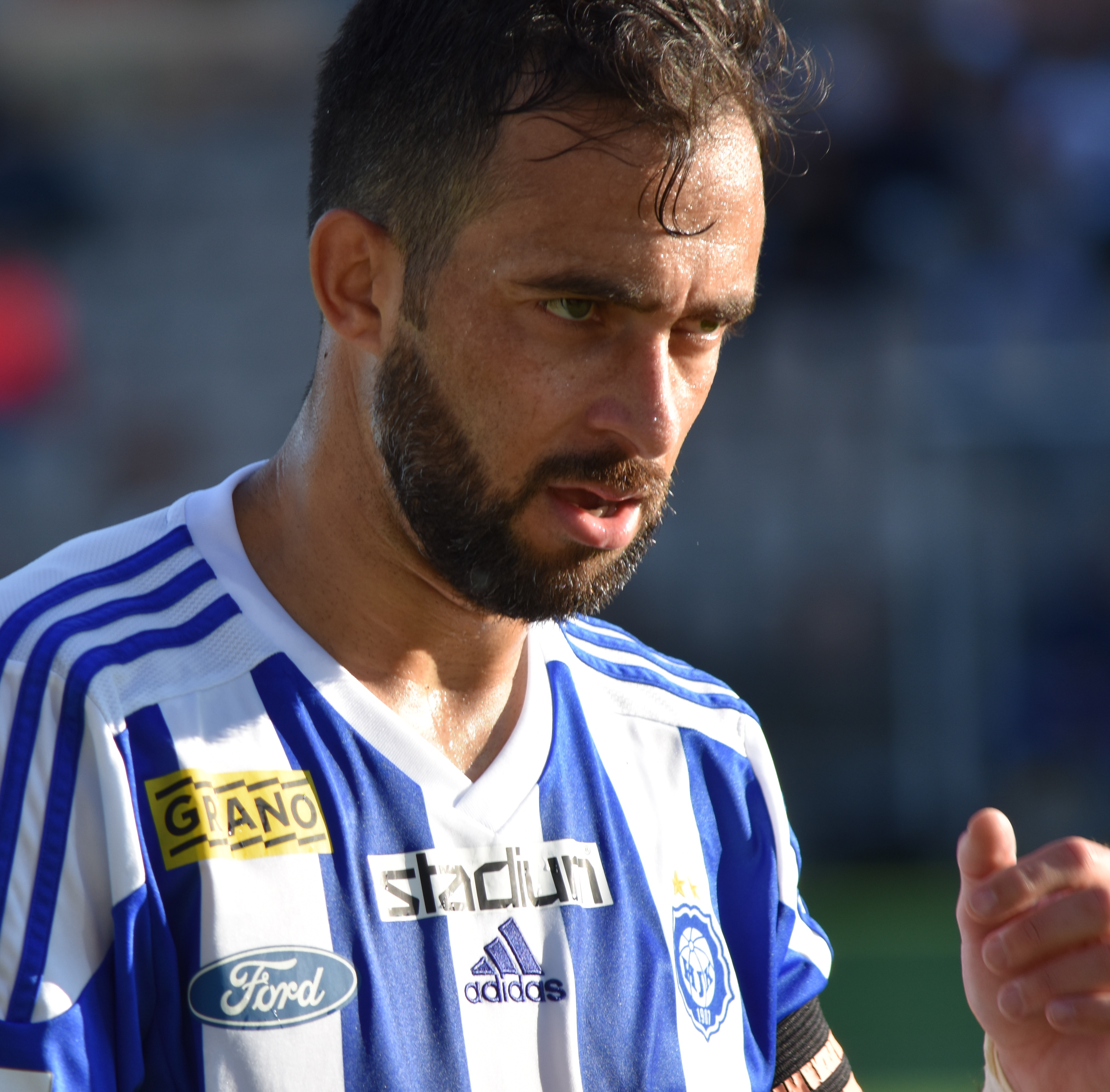
- Rafinha with HJK in 2018.

Personal information
- Full name: Rafael Scapini de Almeida
- Date of birth: 29 June 1982 (age 44)
- Place of birth: Brazil
- Height: 1.84 m (6 ft 0 in)
- Positions: Midfielder; defender

Team information
- Current team: AC Oulu (assistant coach)

Senior career*
Years	Team	Apps	(Gls)
–2005	Campinas		
2005–2007	AC Oulu	67	(13)
2008–2009	Tampere United	48	(8)
2010–2011	HJK	44	(3)
2011–2016	Gent	101	(2)
2016–2019	HJK	95	(4)
2020–2022	AC Oulu	72	(1)
2023–	OLS	30	(1)

Managerial career
- 2023–2024: OLS (assistant)
- 2024–: AC Oulu (assistant)
- * Club domestic league appearances and goals as of 9 November 2024

Rafael Scapini de Almeida (born 29 June 1982), commonly known as Rafinha (Portuguese pronunciation: [ʁɐˈfĩɲɐ]), is a Brazilian football coach and a former professional footballer. He is currently working as an assistant coach of Veikkausliiga club AC Oulu. Besides Brazil, he has played in Finland and Belgium. During his career, Rafinha was deployed on different positions on the field, having started as a winger, moving on to midfield and ending his career as a centre back.

Rafinha is considered a club legend of AC Oulu, the club he has represented in multiple seasons.

== Career ==
Rafinha started playing football in his native Brazil. He worked as a storage worker and played in lower amateur divisions in Campinas.

In March 2005, he moved to Finland and after a successful trial, he signed with AC Oulu in second-tier Ykkönen. He was named the Ykkönen Player of the Year in 2006. In the 2007 season, Rafinha debuted in Finnish top-tier Veikkausliiga, after AC Oulu had won a promotion in 2006. During 2008–2009, he played in Veikkausliiga for Tampere United, and in 2010 and 2011, he won two Finnish championship titles with HJK, and additionally the Finnish Cup in 2011.

He was acquired by Belgian club Gent in 2011 for an undisclosed fee. In 2016, after five seasons, one Belgian championship title and six UEFA Champions League group stage appearances with Gent, Rafinha returned to Finland and signed with HJK. He went on winning two more championship titles with HJK, in 2017 and 2018, and Finnish Cup in 2017. He also captained the HJK team.

In 2020, Rafinha returned to AC Oulu, his first club in Finland. Three years later, after having helped the club to establish themselves in Veikkausliiga, he announced the ending of his professional career, at the age of 40. However, next 2023 season he played for Oulun Luistinseura (OLS), the reserve team of AC Oulu in third-tier Kakkonen, and worked as an assistant coach on a player-coach contract.

== Coaching career ==
On 26 November 2023, Rafinha was appointed as a full-time assistant coach of the reserve team OLS.

Since 2024, he is working as an assistant coach of AC Oulu.

== Personal life ==
Rafinha is married with a Finnish woman with whom he has two children.

== Career statistics ==
As of 9 November 2024

Appearances and goals by club, season and competition
Club	Season	League			National cup (Note: Includes Finnish Cup and Belgian Cup)		League cup		Europe		Other		Total	
Club	Season	Division	Apps	Goals	Apps	Goals	Apps	Goals	Apps	Goals	Apps	Goals	Apps	Goals
AC Oulu	2005	Ykkönen	22	6	0	0	—		—		—		22	6
AC Oulu	2006	Ykkönen	22	6	0	0	—		—		—		22	6
AC Oulu	2007	Veikkausliiga	22	1	0	0	—		—		—		22	1
AC Oulu	Total		66	13	0	0	0	0	0	0	0	0	66	13
Tampere United	2008	Veikkausliiga	22	1	0	0	—		4 (Note: Appearance in the UEFA Champions League)	0	—		26	1
Tampere United	2009	Veikkausliiga	25	7	0	0	—				—		25	7
Tampere United	Total		47	8	0	0	0	0	4	0	0	0	51	8
HJK	2010	Veikkausliiga	24	1	4	0	7	1	6 (Note: Four Appearances in the UEFA Champions League, Two Appearances in the UEFA Europa League)	0	—		41	2
HJK	2011	Veikkausliiga	20	2	2	0	7	0	5 (Note: Three Appearances in the UEFA Champions League, Two Appearances in the UEFA Europa League)	1	—		34	3
HJK	Total		44	3	6	0	14	1	11	1	0	0	75	5
Gent	2011–12	Belgian Pro League	20	1	3	0	—				—		23	1
Gent	2012–13	Belgian Pro League	24	0	4	0	—		1 (Note: Appearance(s) in the UEFA Europa League)	0	—		29	0
Gent	2013–14	Belgian Pro League	21	0	4	0	—				—		25	0
Gent	2014–15	Belgian Pro League	19	1	4	0	—				—		23	1
Gent	2015–16	Belgian Pro League	17	0	3	0	—		7 (Note: Six Appearances in the UEFA Champions League)	0	1 (Note: One appearance in the Belgian Super Cup)	0	27	0
Gent	Total		101	2	18	0	0	0	7	0	1	0	127	2
HJK	2016	Veikkausliiga	13	1	1	0	—		—		—		14	1
HJK	2017	Veikkausliiga	31	2	7	1	—		4	0	—		42	3
HJK	2018	Veikkausliiga	24	1	6	1	—		6 (Note: Appearance(s) in UEFA Champions League and UEFA Europa League)	0	—		36	2
HJK	2019	Veikkausliiga	27	1	5	0	—		6	0	—		38	1
HJK	Total		95	5	19	2	0	0	16	0	0	0	130	7
AC Oulu	2020	Ykkönen	21	1	3	1	—		—		—		24	2
AC Oulu	2021	Veikkausliiga	26	0	3	0	—		—		—		29	0
AC Oulu	2022	Veikkausliiga	25	0	3	0	2	0	—		—		30	0
AC Oulu	Total		72	1	9	1	2	0	0	0	0	0	83	2
OLS	2023	Kakkonen	20	0	1	0	—		—		—		21	0
OLS	2024	Ykkönen	10	1	2	0	—		—		—		12	1
OLS	Total		30	1	3	0	0	0	0	0	0	0	33	1
Career totals			455	33	55	3	16	1	39	1	1	0	566	37

== Honours ==
HJK

- Veikkausliiga (4): 2010, 2011, 2017, 2018
- Finnish Cup (2): 2011, 2017

K.A.A. Gent

- Belgian Pro League (1): 2014–15
- Belgian Supercup (1): 2015

Tampere United

- Finnish League Cup: 2009

AC Oulu

- Ykkönen (1): 2020

Individual

- Ykkönen Player of the Year 2006
