= Mika Nurmela =

Finnish footballer (born 1971)

Personal information
- Date of birth: 26 December 1971 (age 54)
- Place of birth: Oulu, Finland
- Height: 1.78 m (5 ft 10 in)
- Position: Midfielder

Team information
- Current team: AC Oulu (sporting director)

Senior career*
Years	Team	Apps	(Gls)
1988–1989	OLS	36	(4)
1990	RPallo	21	(6)
1991–1992	Haka	65	(8)
1993–1995	Malmö FF	31	(3)
1994	→ TPS (loan)	6	(2)
1995–1999	Emmen	122	(19)
1999–2003	Heerenveen	133	(26)
2003–2005	1. FC Kaiserslautern	28	(0)
2005	OLS	4	(0)
2005	HJK	7	(2)
2005–2006	Heracles Almelo	22	(2)
2006	AC Oulu	2	(1)
2006–2007	HJK	40	(4)
2008	RoPS	25	(1)
2009–2014	AC Oulu	153	(25)

International career
1987	Finland U15	9	(1)
1988	Finland U16	8	(3)
1988–1989	Finland U17	11	(1)
1990	Finland U19	1	(0)
1991–1994	Finland U21	19	(1)
1992–2008	Finland	71	(4)

Managerial career
- 2013–2014: AC Oulu (sporting director)
- 2015: Finland (assistant)
- 2017–2024: Finland (assistant)
- 2025–: AC Oulu (sporting director)
- * Club domestic league appearances and goals

Mika Nurmela (born 26 December 1971) is a Finnish football coach and former professional footballer, who played as a midfielder or winger. He is currently the sporting director of AC Oulu.

After his playing career, he also worked as the sporting director of his hometown club AC Oulu, when they played in Ykkönen in 2010s. During 2015–2024, Nurmela was an assistant coach of the Finland national team.

== Club career ==
While playing for Heerenveen in Eredivisie during the 1999–2000 season, Nurmela was awarded for the joint-most assists of the season with 12 contributions.

Nurmela ended his professional playing career in 2014, at the age of 43.

== International ==
Nurmela was capped 71 times for the Finland national team, scoring four goals. He ended his international career in January 2008.

== Personal life ==
His son Anselmi Nurmela is also a professional footballer who plays for OLS.

== Career statistics ==
=== Club ===
Appearances and goals by club, season and competition
Club	Season	League			Cup (Note: Includes KNVB Cup, DFB-Pokal, Suomen Cup and Finnish League Cup)		Europe		Total	
Club	Season	Division	Apps	Goals	Apps	Goals	Apps	Goals	Apps	Goals
OLS Oulu	1988	Kakkonen	15	3	–		–		15	3
OLS Oulu	1989	Kakkonen	21	1	–		–		21	1
OLS Oulu	Total		36	4	0	0	0	0	36	4
Rauman Pallo	1990	Kakkonen	21	6	–		–		21	6
Haka	1991	Veikkausliiga	33	5	–		–		33	5
Haka	1992	Veikkausliiga	32	3	–		–		32	3
Haka	Total		65	8	0	0	0	0	65	8
Malmö FF	1993	Allsvenskan	16	3	–		1 (Note: Appearance(s) in UEFA Intertoto Cup)	0	17	3
Malmö FF	1994	Allsvenskan	5	0	–		–		5	0
Malmö FF	1995	Allsvenskan	10	0	–		0	0	10	0
Malmö FF	Total		31	3	0	0	1	0	32	3
TPS (loan)	1994	Veikkausliiga	6	2	–		–		6	2
Emmen	1995–96	Eerste Divisie	25	5	0	0	–		25	5
Emmen	1996–97	Eerste Divisie	34	4	0	0	–		34	4
Emmen	1997–98	Eerste Divisie	31	7	1	0	–		32	7
Emmen	1998–99	Eerste Divisie	38	3	4	2	–		42	5
Emmen	Total		128	19	5	2	0	0	133	21
Heerenveen	1999–00	Eredivisie	34	8	2	0	4	0	40	8
Heerenveen	2000–01	Eredivisie	33	5	1	0	6 (Note: Appearances in UEFA Champions League)	0	40	5
Heerenveen	2001–02	Eredivisie	34	4	2	1	4	1	40	6
Heerenveen	2002–03	Eredivisie	32	9	2	0	2 (Note: Appearances in UEFA Cup)	0	36	9
Heerenveen	Total		133	26	7	1	16	1	156	28
1. FC Kaiserslautern	2003–04	Bundesliga	21	0	0	0	2	0	23	0
1. FC Kaiserslautern	2004–05	Bundesliga	7	0	1	0	–		8	0
1. FC Kaiserslautern	Total		28	0	1	0	2	0	31	0
OLS Oulu	2005	Ykkönen	2	0	–		–		2	0
HJK Helsinki	2005	Veikkausliiga	7	2	–		–		7	2
Heracles Almelo	2005–06	Eredivisie	24	2	0	0	–		24	2
AC Oulu	2006	Ykkönen	4	0	–		–		4	0
HJK Helsinki	2006	Veikkausliiga	15	2	–		2	0	17	2
HJK Helsinki	2007	Veikkausliiga	25	2	–		3	0	28	2
HJK Helsinki	Total		40	4	0	0	5	0	45	4
RoPS	2008	Veikkausliiga	25	1	–		–		25	1
AC Oulu	2009	Ykkönen	26	4	–		–		26	4
AC Oulu	2010	Veikkausliiga	25	6	–		–		25	6
AC Oulu	2011	Ykkönen	24	5	2	0	–		26	5
AC Oulu	2012	Ykkönen	25	3	2	0	–		27	3
AC Oulu	2013	Ykkönen	26	3	1	0	–		27	3
AC Oulu	2014	Ykkönen	27	4	2	0	–		29	4
AC Oulu	Total		153	25	7	0	0	0	160	25
Career total			603	102	20	3	24	1	647	106

=== International goals ===
Scores and results list Finland's goal tally first, score column indicates score after each Nurmela goal.

List of international goals scored by Mika Nurmela
No.	Date	Venue	Opponent	Score	Result	Competition
1	6 September 2003	Shafa Stadium, Baku, Azerbaijan	Azerbaijan		2–1	Euro 2004 qualifying
2	19 November 2003	Estadio Alejandro Morera Soto, Alajuela, Costa Rica	Costa Rica		1–2	Friendly
3	18 March 2005	Prince Mohamed bin Fahd Stadium, Dammam, Saudi Arabia	Saudi Arabia		4–1	Friendly
4	15 November 2006	Finnair Stadium, Helsinki, Finland	Armenia		1–0	Euro 2008 qualifying

== Honours ==
- Finnish Cup: 1994, 2006
