= Eetu Saarela =

Finnish footballer (born 2006)

Personal information
- Date of birth: 24 April 2006 (age 20)
- Place of birth: Oulu, Finland
- Height: 1.87 m (6 ft 2 in)
- Position: Centre back

Team information
- Current team: OLS

Youth career
- –2023: OLS

Senior career*
Years	Team	Apps	(Gls)
2024–	OLS	43	(1)
2024–	AC Oulu	1	(0)

International career^{‡}
2024	Finland U18	3	(0)
2024–	Finland U19	1	(0)
- * Club domestic league appearances and goals as of 20 November 2025 ‡ National team caps and goals as of 12 October 2024

Eetu Saarela (born 24 April 2006) is a Finnish professional footballer playing as a centre back for Veikkausliiga club AC Oulu.

== Early life ==
Saarela was born in Oulu, but lived in San Diego, United States, during 2009–2019 due to parents' work.

== Career ==
Saarela played in the youth sector of Oulun Luistinseura (OLS), and was part of OLS U17 squad finishing 2nd in the youth league in 2023, and thus winning the silver medal. He scored the decisive equalizing goal in the extra-time against HJK U17 on 30 September 2023, which secured the 2nd spot for his team.

Saarela signed his first professional contract with AC Oulu organisation on 13 December 2023.

On 27 January 2024, Saarela made his senior debut with AC Oulu first team, in a Finnish League Cup draw against FC Haka.

On 14 August 2024, his contract was extended on a two-year deal with a one-year option.

== International career ==
Saarela made his international debut for Finland U18 national team on 24 March 2024, in a 2–2 friendly draw against Croatia.

== Career statistics ==
As of 26 February 2025

Appearances and goals by club, season and competition
Club	Season	League			Cup (Note: Includes Suomen Cup)		League cup (Note: Includes Finnish League Cup)		Europe		Total	
Club	Season	Division	Apps	Goals	Apps	Goals	Apps	Goals	Apps	Goals	Apps	Goals
OLS	2024	Ykkönen	23	1	0	0	—		—		23	1
AC Oulu	2024	Veikkausliiga	1	0	2	1	2	0	—		5	1
AC Oulu	2025	Veikkausliiga	0	0	0	0	1	0	–		1	0
AC Oulu	Total		1	0	2	1	3	1	0	0	6	2
Career total			24	1	2	1	3	0	0	0	29	2

== Honours ==
OLS U17

- P17 SM-sarja: 2023 Runners-up
