= Hollihaka =

- District of Oulu
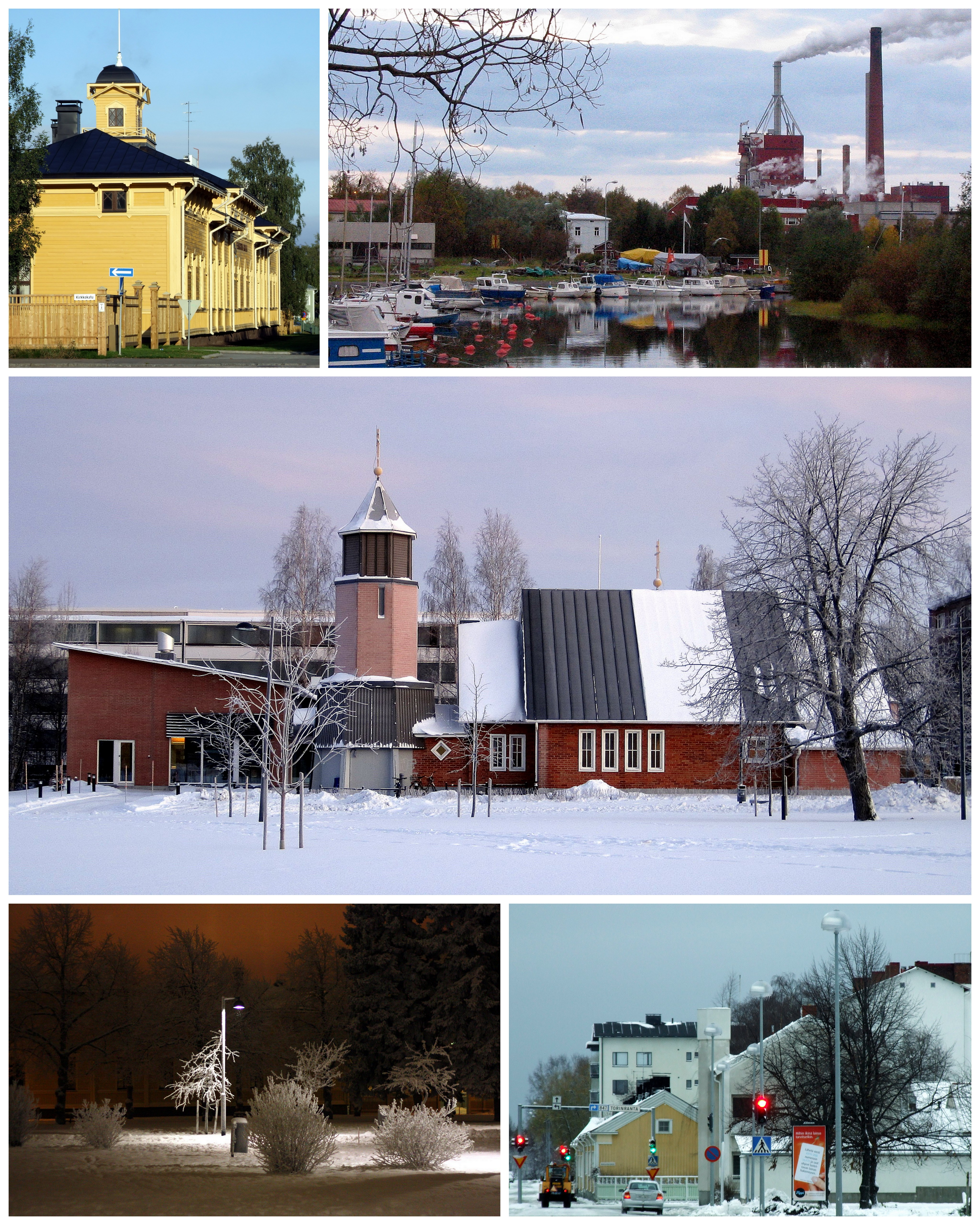
- Interactive map of Hollihaka
- Coordinates: 65°00′22″N 025°27′15″E
- Country: Finland
- City: Oulu
- Areas of Oulu: City Centre

Population (2013)
  - Total: 2,447
- Postal code: 90120

Hollihaka is a district of the city centre area of Oulu, Finland. It is bounded by the estuary of the Oulujoki river to the west, the Vanhatulli district to the north, the Leveri district to the east and the Nuottasaari district to the south. Together with the two latter districts, Hollihaka forms a neighbourhood called Heinäpää.

Hollihaka is mainly residential area. There are a few noteworthy parks in the district: a large waterside park Hollihaka Park, a small city park Heinätorinpuisto Park and Kyösti Kallio Park, the park bordering the Puistokatu street. The Holy Trinity Cathedral of the Oulu Diocese of the Orthodox Church of Finland is located in Hollihaka.
