= Rene Kähkönen =

Finnish footballer (born 2006)

Personal information
- Date of birth: 13 January 2006 (age 20)
- Place of birth: Oulu, Finland
- Height: 1.82 m (6 ft 0 in)
- Position: Forward

Team information
- Current team: AC Oulu
- Number: 36

Youth career
- –2023: OLS

Senior career*
Years	Team	Apps	(Gls)
2023–	OLS	28	(5)
2023–	AC Oulu	2	(0)

International career^{‡}
2021	Finland U16	1	(1)
2022	Finland U17	3	(0)
2023–	Finland U18	4	(0)
- * Club domestic league appearances and goals as of 7 November 2024 ‡ National team caps and goals as of 9 June 2023

Rene Kähkönen (born 13 January 2006) is a Finnish professional footballer playing as a forward for Veikkausliiga club AC Oulu.

== Club career ==
Kähkönen played in the youth sector Oulun Luistinseura (OLS). He made his senior debut in 2023 with OLS first team, the reserve team of AC Oulu, playing in then third-tier Kakkonen. On 17 June 2023, Kähkönen signed his first professional contract with AC Oulu, on a deal until the end of 2024, with an option for one more. Later in the same year, he debuted in top tier Veikkausliiga with the club's first team.

== Career statistics ==
As of 26 February 2025

Appearances and goals by club, season and competition
Club	Season	League			Cup (Note: Includes Suomen Cup)		League cup (Note: Includes Finnish League Cup)		Europe		Total	
Club	Season	Division	Apps	Goals	Apps	Goals	Apps	Goals	Apps	Goals	Apps	Goals
OLS	2023	Kakkonen	6	1	0	0	—		—		6	1
OLS	2024	Ykkönen	22	4	0	0	—		—		22	4
OLS	Total		28	5	0	0	0	0	0	0	28	5
AC Oulu	2023	Veikkausliiga	2	0	—		—		—		2	0
AC Oulu	2024	Veikkausliiga	0	0	1	1	0	0	—		1	1
AC Oulu	2025	Veikkausliiga	0	0	0	0	4	0	–		4	0
AC Oulu	Total		2	0	1	1	4	0	0	0	7	1
Career total			30	5	1	1	4	0	0	0	35	6
