= Jani Luukkonen =

Finnish football coach and former goalkeeper (born 1977)

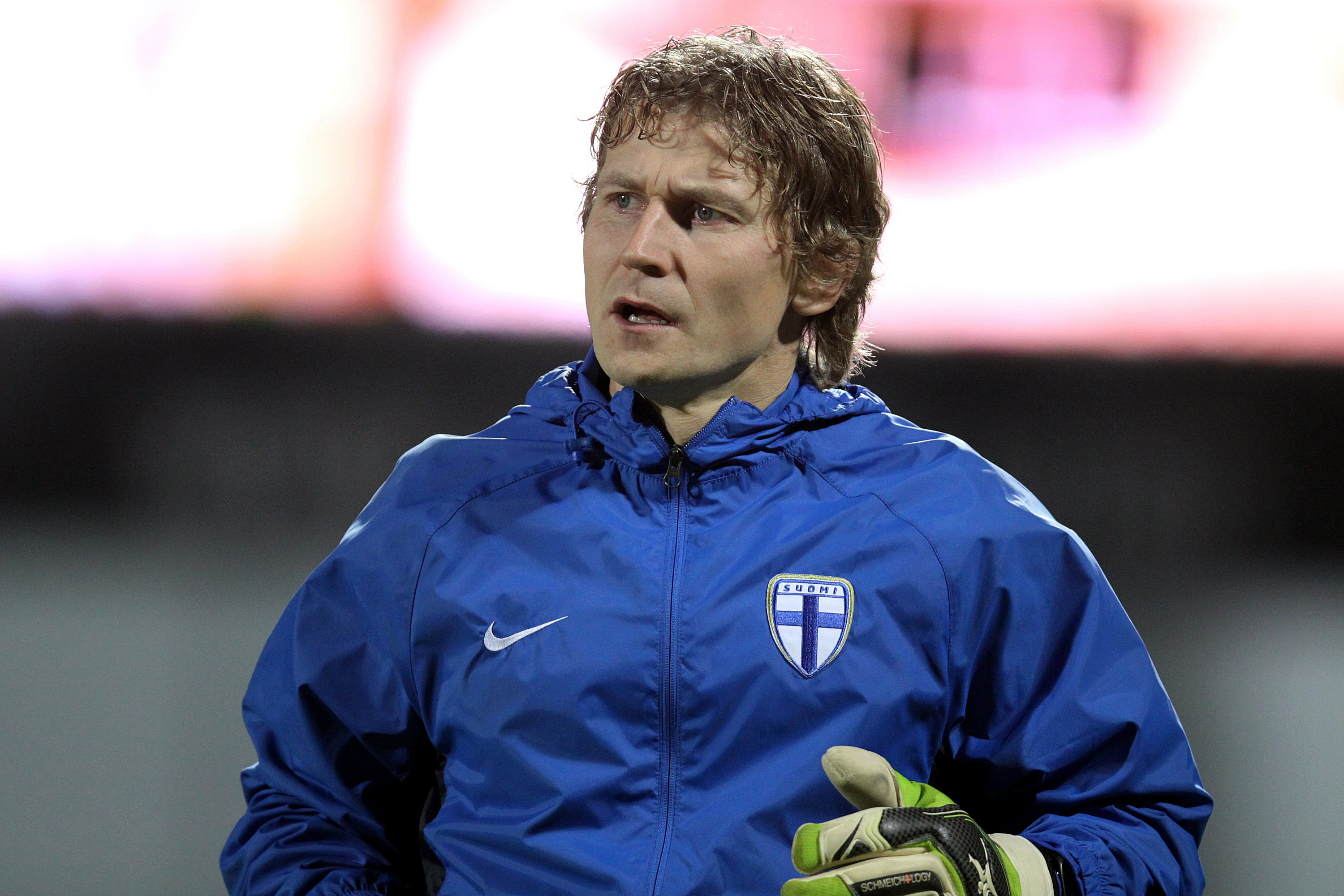
- The goalkeeping coach Jani Luukkonen with Finland U21 national team in 2015

Personal information
- Date of birth: 7 June 1977 (age 49)
- Place of birth: Mikkeli, Finland
- Height: 1.84 m (6 ft 0 in)
- Position: Goalkeeper

Team information
- Current team: AC Oulu (goalkeeping coach)

Youth career
- 1988–1995: MP

Senior career*
Years	Team	Apps	(Gls)
1995–1998	MP	18	(0)
1999–2000	TP-Seinäjoki	33	(0)
2001	KajHa	5	(0)
2001–2002	Tervarit	32	(0)
2003–2006	AC Oulu	104	(0)
2007–2008	MyPa	4	(0)
2007–2008	→ MP (loan)	5	(0)
2009	FC OPA	26	(0)
2010–2011	AC Oulu	1	(0)

International career
1992	Finland U15	10	(0)
1995	Finland U18	1	(0)

Managerial career
- 2009–: AC Oulu (gk coach)
- 2013–2016: Finland U21 (gk coach)
- * Club domestic league appearances and goals as of 4 March 2024

Jani Luukkonen (born 7 June 1977) is a Finnish football coach and a former player, who played as a goalkeeper. He is currently working as a goalkeeping coach of Veikkausliiga club AC Oulu, the club he used to represent as a player for several years. Luukkonen has completed the UEFA B -coaching license.

== Coaching career ==
Luukkonen has worked as a goalkeeping coach for AC Oulu since January 2009.

He was also part of the coaching staff of the Finland U21 national team between 2013 and 2016.
