= Otso-Pekka Parkkila =

Finnish footballer (born 2007)

Personal information
- Date of birth: 9 August 2007 (age 19)
- Place of birth: Finland
- Position: Full back

Team information
- Current team: AC Oulu
- Number: 15

Youth career
- –2023: OLS

Senior career*
Years	Team	Apps	(Gls)
2023–	OLS	64	(0)
2024–	AC Oulu	0	(0)

International career^{‡}
2021	Finland U15	1	(0)
2022	Finland U16	6	(0)
2023–2024	Finland U17	14	(0)
2024–	Finland U18	1	(0)
2024–	Finland U19	1	(0)
- * Club domestic league appearances and goals as of 7 November 2026 ‡ National team caps and goals as of 9 September 2024

Otso-Pekka Parkkila (born 9 August 2007) is a Finnish professional footballer playing as a full back for Veikkausliiga club AC Oulu.

== Career ==
Parkkila played in the Oulun Luistinseura (OLS) youth sector. He was part of the AC Oulu/OLS U17 squad finishing 2nd in the U17 domestic league, and thus winning the silver medal in 2023. Parkkila also made his senior debut with the OLS first team in the third-tier Kakkonen in 2023.

On 10 December 2023, he signed a professional contract with Veikkausliiga club AC Oulu on a two-year deal, with an option for an additional year. He will be registered to the club's reserve team OLS, starting to play in a new third-tier Ykkönen in 2024.

Parkkila made his debut with AC Oulu first team on 3 February 2024, in a 2–0 away win against SJK in Finnish League Cup, playing full 90 minutes.

== International career ==
Parkkila was part of the Finland U16 squad that won the friendly tournament Baltic Cup in July 2023.

On 4 October 2023, he was named in the Finland U17 squad in the 2024 UEFA European Under-17 Championship qualification tournament. In the tournament Finland drew with Ukraine and Germany 2–2 and 1–1, respectively, before winning Liechtenstein 3–0, placing 2nd in the group and advancing to the Elite round.

== Career statistics ==
As of 19 October 2024

Appearances and goals by club, season and competition
Club	Season	League			Cup (Note: Includes Suomen Cup)		League cup (Note: Includes Finnish League Cup)		Europe		Total	
Club	Season	Division	Apps	Goals	Apps	Goals	Apps	Goals	Apps	Goals	Apps	Goals
OLS	2023	Kakkonen	4	0	0	0	—		—		4	0
OLS	2024	Ykkönen	24	0	2	1	—		—		26	1
OLS	Total		28	0	2	1	0	0	0	0	30	1
AC Oulu	2024	Veikkausliiga	0	0	0	0	3	0	—		3	0
Career total			28	0	2	1	3	0	0	0	33	1

== Honours ==
OLS

- Kakkonen, Group C: 2023

AC Oulu/OLS U17

- P17 SM-sarja: 2023 Runners-up
