= Heinätorinpuisto Park =

Park in Oulu, Finland

Coordinates: 65°0′27″N 25°27′45″E

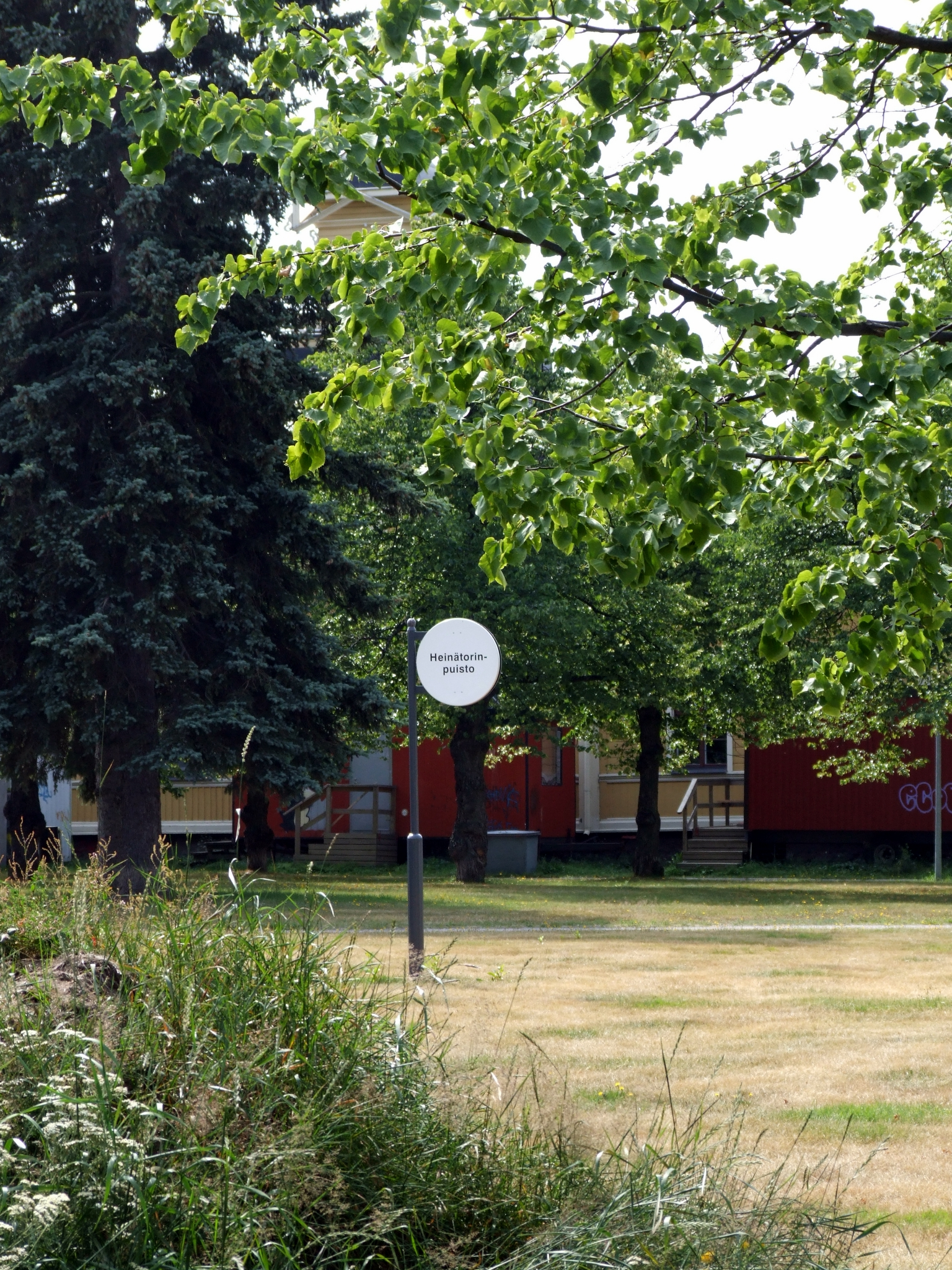
Heinätorinpuisto Park

Heinätorinpuisto Park is a public park in the Hollihaka district of Oulu, Finland.
