= AC Oulu =

Finnish football club

Oulu
- Full name: AC Oulu
- Nickname: Laivastonsiniset (The Navy Blues)
- Founded: 2002; 24 years ago
- Ground: Heinäpää Football Stadium, Oulu
- Capacity: 5,080
- Chairman: Tomi Kaismo
- Manager: Mikko Isokangas
- League: Veikkausliiga
- 2026: Veikkausliiga, 4th of 12
- Website: acoulu.fi
Home colours	Away colours

AC Oulu is a Finnish professional football club based in Oulu, currently playing in Finland's premier division, Veikkausliiga. Formed in 2002, the club have played six seasons in Finland's highest football league Veikkausliiga and 16 seasons in the second highest league. They currently play their home games at Heinäpää Football Stadium, and the club colours are navy blue, and white.

== History ==
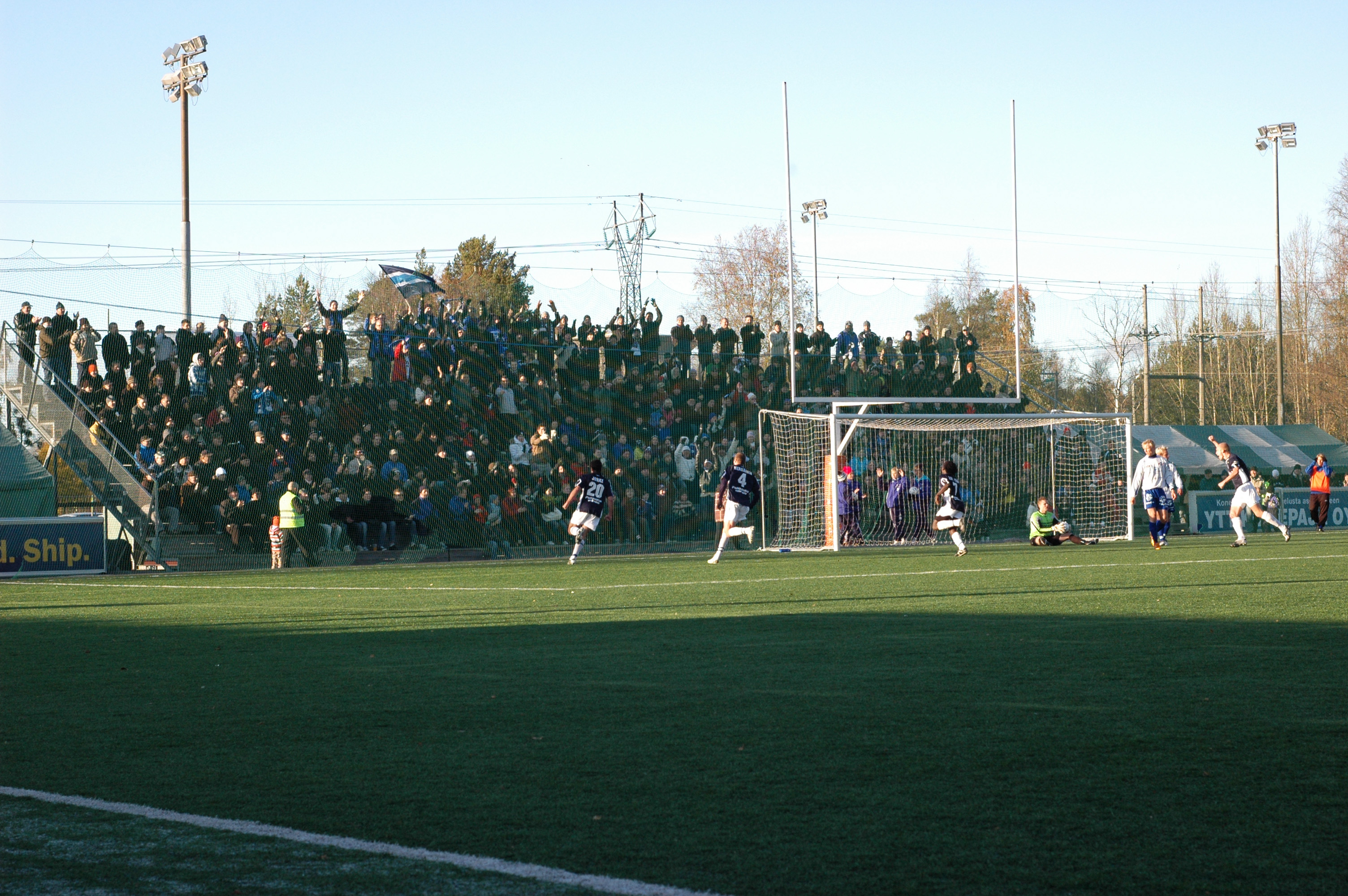
AC Oulu – FC Hämeenlinna in Castrén Stadium, Oulu, on 11 October 2009

=== Early years; 2002–2010 and the first promotions ===
AC Oulu was founded in 2002 as a joint initiative of four local clubs, Oulun Luistinseura (OLS), Oulun Palloseura (OPS), Oulun Työväen Palloilijat (OTP) and Tervarit, with the aim of bringing top level football back to Oulu. FC Oulu played in the Veikkausliiga in the early '90s as the most recent team from Oulu to play top-tier Finnish football. The club inherited the league license of Tervarit in the second-tier Ykkönen for the 2003 season.

After four seasons in Ykkönen, AC Oulu reached the Finland's premier division Veikkausliiga in 2007. However, they were relegated back to the Ykkönen at the end of their first season in the top division. After two seasons in the second tier AC Oulu won promotion again to the Veikkausliiga at the end of the 2009 season after finishing top of the Ykkönen.

Having finished 11th in 2010 season the club were initially going to continue in the Veikkausliiga for the 2011 season. However, they were denied a league licence for financial reasons and therefore dropped down to the Ykkönen.

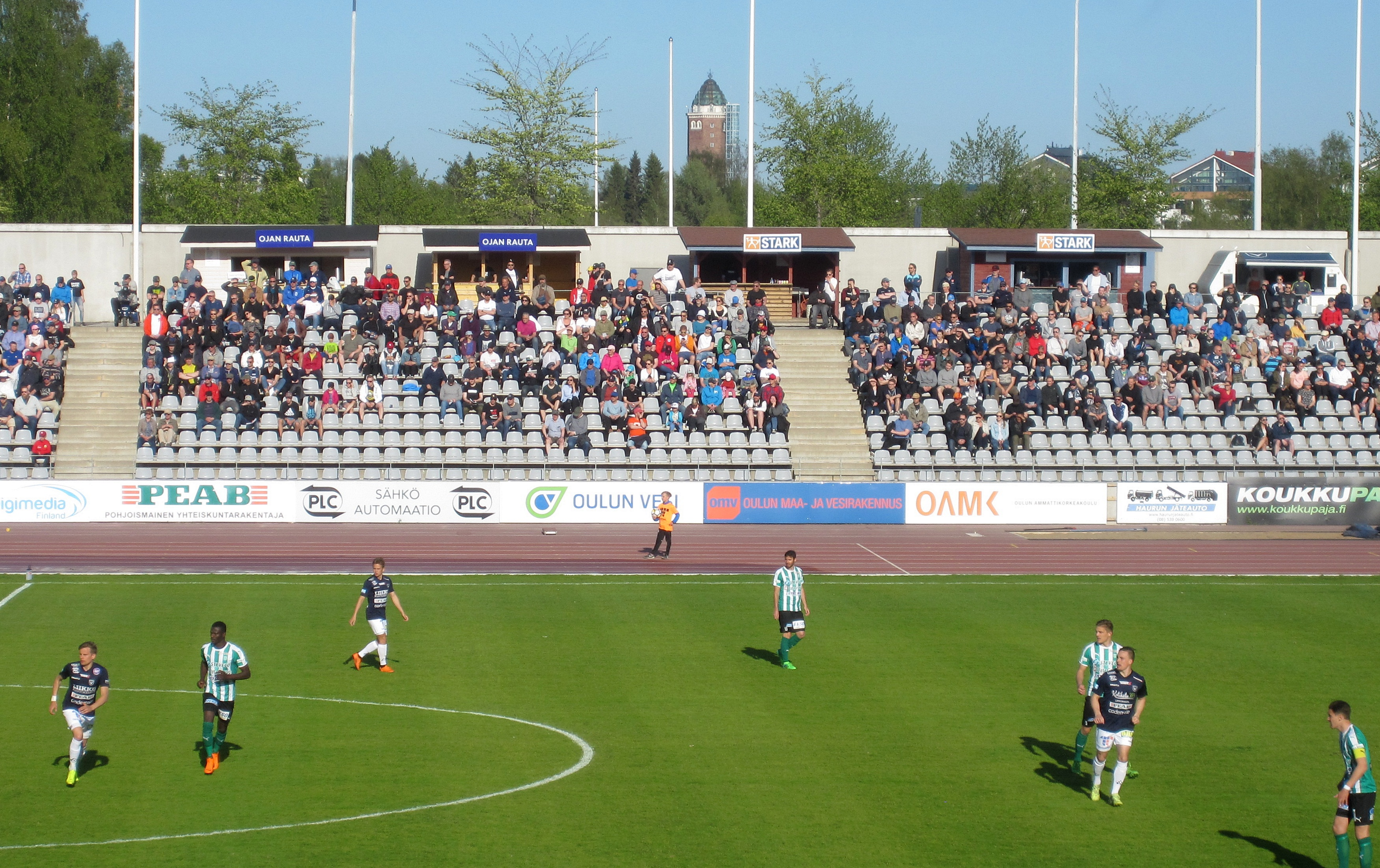
AC Oulu – KTP in Raatti Stadium, Oulu, on 21 May 2018

=== "Eternal Ykkönen"; 2011–2020 ===
Since the relegation for financial reasons in 2010, AC Oulu played in Ykkönen for ten years, where it was considered as a candidate to promote for a long time. During 2009–2014, the former Finland national team winger Mika Nurmela played for the club, and simultaneously worked as a sporting director in AC Oulu. Dritan Stafsula had returned to the club in 2011 and represented AC Oulu until 2015, having established himself the club's top goal scorer with 54 goals. During 2016–2018, the former national team defender Markus Heikkinen played for the club as a player-coach. Since 2017, he has also been working as a sporting director for the club. In 2018, Tomi Kaismo and his investment company OTC-Sijoitus Oy, became the biggest shareholder of the club. The club managed to create stability to their economy during those years, and finally won Ykkönen in the 2020 season with head coach Jyrki Ahola, gaining a promotion back to Veikkausliiga for the 2021 season, previous time being in 2010.

=== Veikkausliiga; 2021–present ===
In the 2021 Veikkausliiga season, after the run of poor results, the head coach Jyrki Ahola was sacked in September and replaced by Portuguese Ricardo Duarte. AC Oulu finished 11th in the league, and successfully defended its place in the relegation play-offs against RoPS.

In the 2022 season, the club finished in the 7th place, after having narrowly missed the top-6 championship group in the league. AC Oulu established its place in the league, after having mostly played in the second-tier Ykkönen since its foundation in 2002.

In the early 2023, AC Oulu reached to the final of the pre-season Finnish League Cup tournament, after winning Inter Turku on penalties in the semi-final. They eventually fell short to HJK in the final, losing the game 2–1. Before the league season started, the club sold its own local protégé Miika Koskela to Norwegian club Tromsø IL, and in the summer transfer window Otso Liimatta was sold to Portuguese Primeira Liga club FC Famalicão.

In August 2023, the head coach Duarte announced that he will leave the club after the season, and his option will not be exercised. Only a couple of weeks later, the club announced that Duarte was sacked with an immediate effect, following the loss in the 2023 Finnish Cup semi-final against Ilves, and the miserable results in the league. However, in the end of the season, the club renewed its position in 7th place in the league, having narrowly missed the top-6 again.

After the club had turned 20 years of age in 2022, AC Oulu started the documentary project with a local production studio Feeniks Visual, to highlight the early years when the club was formed starting in 2002. The one-hour long documentary film was first shown in late June 2023 exclusively, and later in April 2024 for the public.

For the 2024 season, the club acquired Tuomas Silvennoinen the new head coach. Due to his lack of the required UEFA Pro coaching license, he was officially named the associate head coach in the coaching staff with Rauno Ojanen and Mikko Viitsalo. The budget for the new season was increased also. In April, it was announced that Hanna Väänänen would step aside from the club's CEO position and later Jani Kotikangas took the charge as the new CEO. The team started the season poorly, and eventually the whole coaching staff was fired on 13 June 2024, after 11 league matches, with a record of one win, five draws and five losses. The reserve team coaches Mikko Isokangas and Rafinha were named the caretaker coaches of the first team, leading the team to advance in the Finnish Cup with a win against KäPa, and drawing with VPS in the league. On 20 June 2024, a former Volos head coach Kostas Bratsos was named the manager of AC Oulu. The team reached the quarter-finals of the 2024 Suomen Cup, but was knocked out by SJK 2–0 in the early July in the OmaSP Stadion in Seinäjoki. On 2 September, after Bratsos had received his third consecutive red card of the season in his 10th league match, he and his whole coaching staff were fired, and the reserve team coaches Isokangas and Rafinha were appointed the interim managers again for the rest of the season. At the time of their departure, the club was sitting in the 9th place of the Veikkausliiga table, just above the relegation play-offs line. Eventually, they finished their disappointing and messed-up season in the 9th place of the table. After the season, Isokangas was officially named the new manager. Later the team's number one striker Ashley Coffey announced he would depart from Oulu. During two seasons he spent with the club, he scored 36 goals in 65 official appearances.

In the beginning of 2025, it was announced that the club had acquired local basketball team Oulun NMKY and volleyball team Oulun Kisko, with the aim to establish AC Oulu as a new multi-sport club.

After the 2025 Veikkausliiga season, long-served sporting director Markus Heikkinen was let go and club legend Mika Nurmela made his return to AC Oulu as new sporting director and coach. They finished in the second place in 2026 Finnish League Cup. In July 2026, the club's own prodigy Julius Körkkö was sold to Danish AC Horsens for a €600,000 transfer fee. After the regular season, AC Oulu made it to the top6 championship group and already secured the club's best ever position in Veikkausliiga. On 12 September, they played inauguration match at the club's new home Heinäpää Football Stadium. In the championship group, they played ten matches with four wins and two draws, eventually finishing 4th in the league and qualifying for the 2027–28 UEFA Conference League qualification for the first time in the club's history. After the last home match of the season, Matias Ojala retired from professional football.

== Stadiums ==
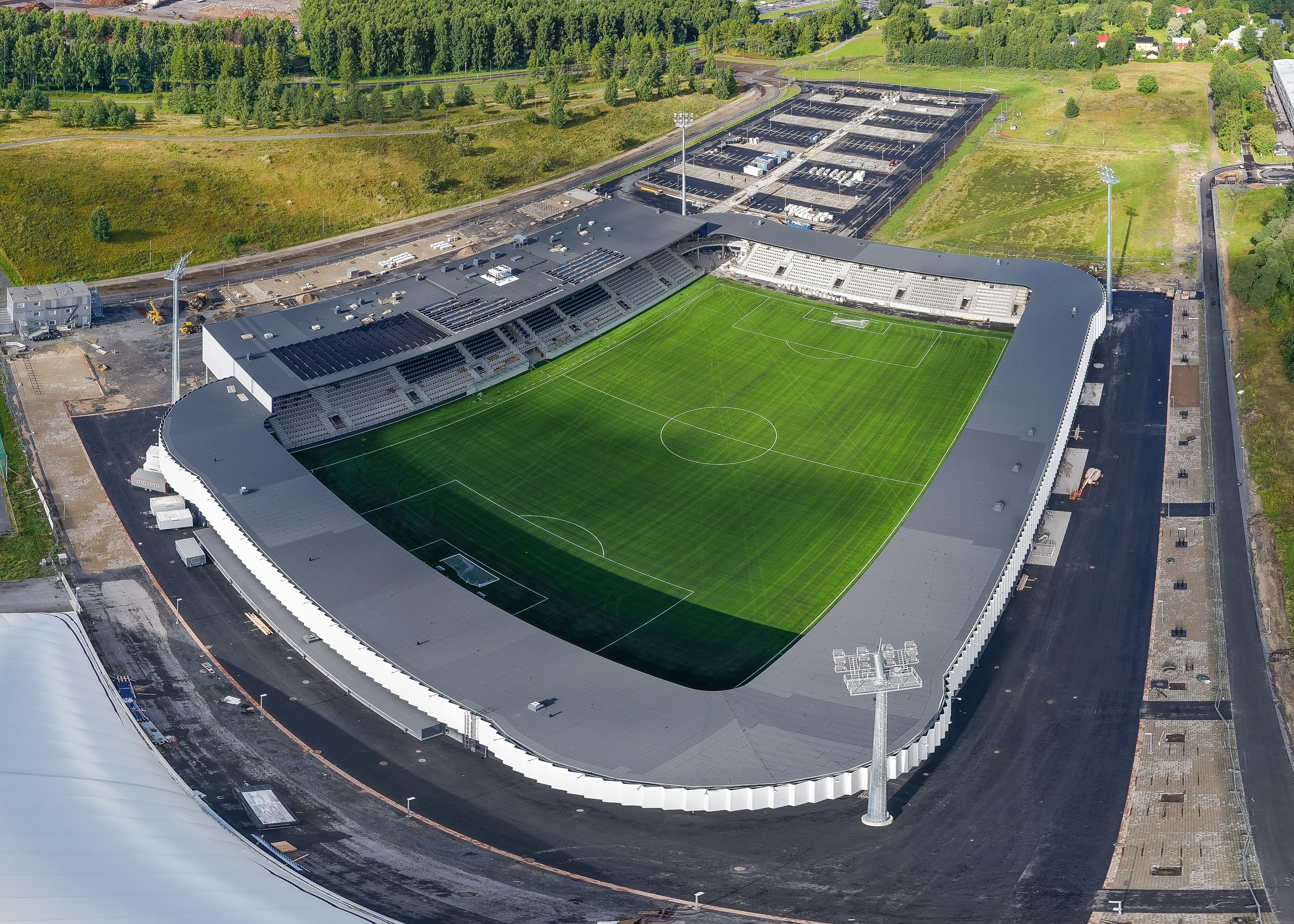
Heinäpää Football Stadium in 2026

=== Castrén Stadium: 2002–2010 ===
Initially after the formation, AC Oulu played its home matches at the city-owned Castrén Stadium in Välivainio, Oulu until 2010. Castrén has a maximum capacity of 4,000 people. The club set their attendance record of 4,717 on 21 October 2006 in a decisive Ykkönen match against Atlantis, which resulted in a 2–0 victory and secured AC Oulu's promotion to Veikkausliiga for the first time.

=== Raatti Stadium: 2011–2026 ===
For the 2011 Ykkönen season, AC Oulu moved to Raatti Stadium, located in Koskikeskus area of Oulu, near the city centre. The city-owned track and field stadium has a capacity of 4,392. AC Oulu played its last match at Raatti on 31 August 2026.

=== Heinäpää Stadium: 2026–present ===
As of September 2026, AC Oulu moved to the newly-built Heinäpää Football Stadium, located in Nuottasaari district in Oulu. The stadium has a capacity of 5,080. AC Oulu played its first match at the stadium on 12 September 2026.

==== Winter arenas ====
For the 2020–21 off-season, the construction for the club's own air-supported indoor arena, sponsor name Garam Masala Areena, was completed. During the winter months, the club trains at the Garam Masala Areena, and plays the official Finnish League Cup matches at the nearby-located Heinäpää football arena, an indoor arena owned by the city of Oulu, with the capacity of 630.

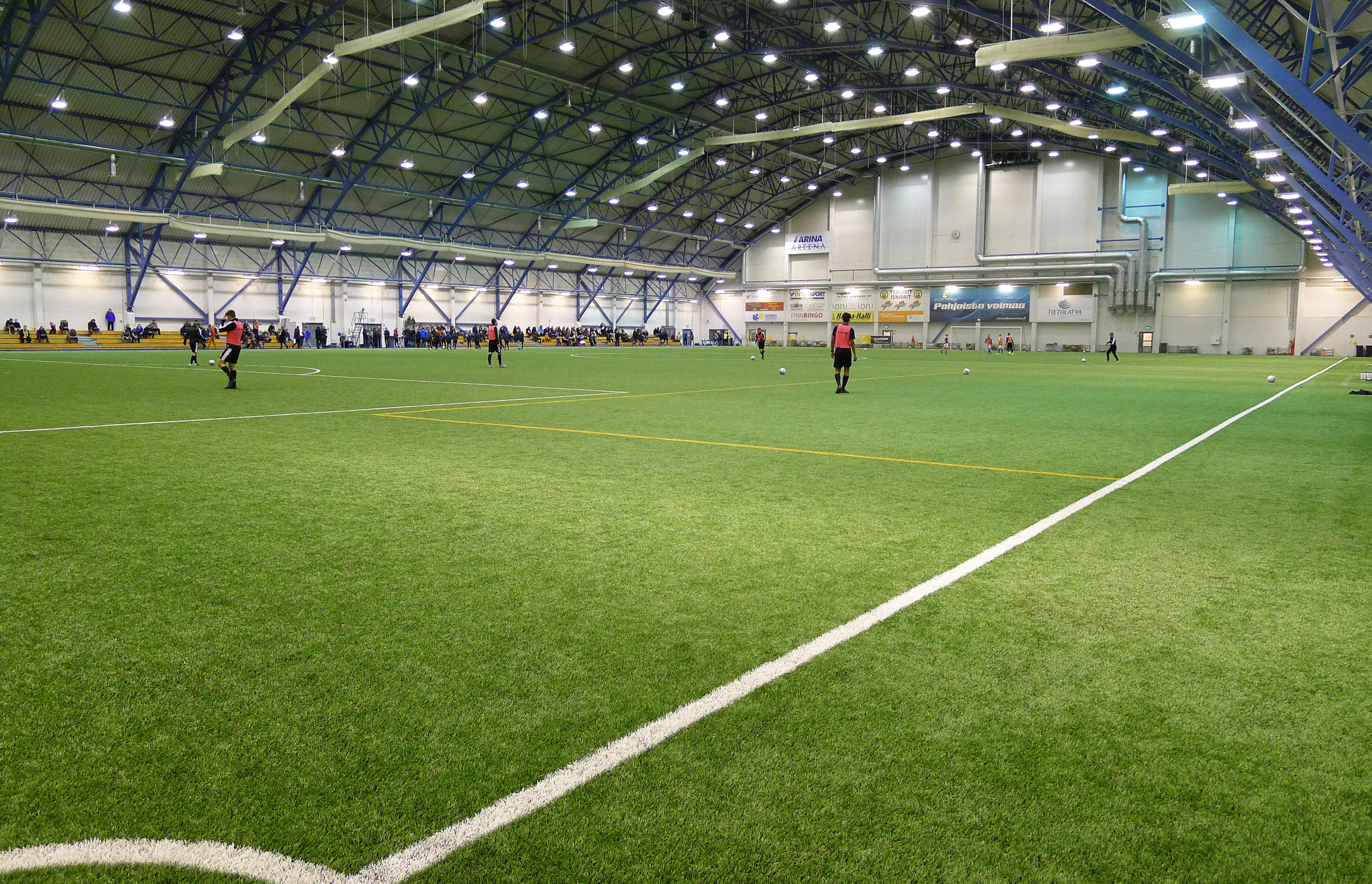
Heinäpää football arena in 2016

== Honours ==
- Finnish League Cup
  - Runners-up (2): 2023, 2026
- Ykkönen (second-tier)
  - Champions (2): 2009, 2020
  - Runners-up (1): 2006

== Season to season ==
Season	Level	Division	Administration	Record	Position	Notes
2003	Tier 2	Ykkönen (First Division)	Finnish FA (Suomen Palloliitto)	26 9 8 9 37–37 35	8th	
2004	Tier 2	Ykkönen (First Division)	Finnish FA (Suomen Palloliitto)	26 10 9 7 39–33 39	5th	
2005	Tier 2	Ykkönen (First Division)	Finnish FA (Suomen Palloliitto)	26 8 7 11 32–33 31	10th	
2006	Tier 2	Ykkönen (First Division)	Finnish FA (Suomen Palloliitto)	26 15 7 4 53–25 52	2nd	Promoted
2007	Tier 1	Veikkausliiga (Premier League)	Finnish FA (Suomen Palloliitto)	26 5 7 14 28–49 22	14th	Relegated
2008	Tier 2	Ykkönen (First Division)	Finnish FA (Suomen Palloliitto)	26 10 11 5 40–26 41	4th	
2009	Tier 2	Ykkönen (First Division)	Finnish FA (Suomen Palloliitto)	26 16 5 5 57–24 53	1st (Champions)	Promoted
2010	Tier 1	Veikkausliiga (Premier League)	Finnish FA (Suomen Palloliitto)	26 8 6 12 31–44 30	11th	Relegated
2011	Tier 2	Ykkönen (First Division)	Finnish FA (Suomen Palloliitto)	24 14 6 4 51–22 48	3rd	
2012	Tier 2	Ykkönen (First Division)	Finnish FA (Suomen Palloliitto)	27 9 10 8 38–35 37	6th	
2013	Tier 2	Ykkönen (First Division)	Finnish FA (Suomen Palloliitto)	27 11 7 9 36–38 40	5th	
2014	Tier 2	Ykkönen (First Division)	Finnish FA (Suomen Palloliitto)	27 13 8 6 46–32 47	4th	
2015	Tier 2	Ykkönen (First Division)	Finnish FA (Suomen Palloliitto)	27 12 8 7 31–28 44	5th	
2016	Tier 2	Ykkönen (First Division)	Finnish FA (Suomen Palloliitto)	27 12 7 8 50–31 43	4th	
2017	Tier 2	Ykkönen (First Division)	Finnish FA (Suomen Palloliitto)	27 12 6 9 40–40 42	4th	
2018	Tier 2	Ykkönen (First Division)	Finnish FA (Suomen Palloliitto)	27 13 5 9 41–30 44	4th	
2019	Tier 2	Ykkönen (First Division)	Finnish FA (Suomen Palloliitto)	27 7 8 12 34–30 29	7th	
2020	Tier 2	Ykkönen (First Division)	Finnish FA (Suomen Palloliitto)	22 15 5 2 38–16 50	1st (Champions)	Promoted
2021	Tier 1	Veikkausliiga (Premier League)	Finnish FA (Suomen Palloliitto)	27 6 5 16 21–44 23	11th	Relegation play-offs
2022	Tier 1	Veikkausliiga (Premier League)	Finnish FA (Suomen Palloliitto)	27 11 6 10 46–43 39	7th	
2023	Tier 1	Veikkausliiga (Premier League)	Finnish FA (Suomen Palloliitto)	27 11 5 11 41–45 38	7th	
2024	Tier 1	Veikkausliiga (Premier League)	Finnish FA (Suomen Palloliitto)	27 7 7 13 32–40 28	9th	
2025	Tier 1	Veikkausliiga (Premier League)	Finnish FA (Suomen Palloliitto)	27 8 3 16 35–53 27	10th	
2026	Tier 1	Veikkausliiga (Premier League)	Finnish FA (Suomen Palloliitto)	32 14 6 12 41–40 48	4th	2027–28 UEFA Conference League qualifiers

- 8 seasons in Veikkausliiga
- 16 seasons in Ykkönen

== Current squad ==
As of 1 September, 2026

Note: Flags indicate national team as defined under FIFA eligibility rules; some limited exceptions apply. Players may hold more than one non-FIFA nationality.

No.	Pos.	Nation	Player
2	DF	FIN	Sami Sipola
3	DF	FIN	Alex Lietsa
5	DF	FIN	Mikko Pitkänen
6	MF	FIN	Julius Paananen
7	FW	FIN	Rasmus Karjalainen (captain)
8	MF	FIN	Matias Ojala (vice-captain)
9	FW	FIN	Roope Riski
10	FW	COL	Camilo Triana
11	FW	FRA	Lamine Ghezali
12	GK	FIN	Johannes Pentti
13	GK	POR	Miguel Santos
14	MF	FIN	Niklas Jokelainen
15	DF	FIN	Otso-Pekka Parkkila

No.	Pos.	Nation	Player
16	DF	FIN	Otto Kemppainen
17	MF	FIN	Onni Tiihonen
18	DF	GBS	Adramane Cassamá
20	FW	GAM	Kalifa Jatta
21	MF	FIN	Iiro Mendolin
22	FW	FIN	Tuomas Kaukua
23	DF	FIN	Sampo Ala-Iso
25	DF	FIN	Markus Arsalo
27	FW	FIN	Elias Kallio
29	DF	FIN	Santeri Silander
30	MF	FIN	Juuso Mäkeläinen
66	DF	FIN	Juha Pirinen
99	GK	FIN	Niklas Schulz

=== Out on loan ===
Note: Flags indicate national team as defined under FIFA eligibility rules; some limited exceptions apply. Players may hold more than one non-FIFA nationality.

No.	Pos.	Nation	Player

== Reserve team squad ==
=== AC Oulu/OLS ===
As of 14 September 2024

Note: Flags indicate national team as defined under FIFA eligibility rules; some limited exceptions apply. Players may hold more than one non-FIFA nationality.

No.	Pos.	Nation	Player
31	FW	FIN	Narit Sarkkinen
34	FW	FIN	Olli Sassi
36	FW	FIN	Rene Kähkönen
38	FW	FIN	Eemil Merikanto
41	DF	FIN	Santtu Seppänen
48	DF	FIN	Otso-Pekka Parkkila
63	FW	FIN	Aleksi Isomäki
68	GK	FIN	Johannes Pentti
71	FW	FIN	Eemeli Raittinen
—	DF	FIN	Nikolas Similä
—	MF	FIN	Asla Peltola
—	DF	FIN	Anselmi Nurmela
—	FW	FIN	Onni Suutari
—	DF	FIN	Eetu Saarela
—	MF	FIN	Jesse Korhonen

No.	Pos.	Nation	Player
—	DF	FIN	Kasper Flygare
—	DF	FIN	Touko Ridanpää
—	FW	FIN	Lauritapio Tiainen
—	GK	FIN	Juuso Saarikoski
—	MF	FIN	Hugo Karlsson
—	GK	FIN	Onni Sillanpää
—	FW	FIN	Aleksi Räisänen
—	MF	FIN	Vili Saarikoski
—	MF	FIN	Lucas Piirto
—	FW	FIN	Antti Torniainen
—	DF	FIN	Santeri Silander
—	DF	FIN	Sampo Ala-Iso
—	GK	NGR	Israel Oklenyi
—	DF	NGR	Chikadibia Nwachukwu
—	MF	NGR	Joel Omotayo

== Youth and reserve teams ==
- AC Oulu/OLS, the reserve team in Kakkonen, promoted to Ykkönen for 2024 season
- AC Oulu/OLS U17
- OsPa, in Kolmonen

In the summer 2020, AC Oulu and one of its founding member clubs Oulun Luistinseura (OLS) signed a new co-operation deal, by which AC Oulu acquired the U-17 team and OLS first team under its command.

In the end of the 2023 season, the club's U17 team won the silver medal in the league of their age group. In addition, the club's reserve team OLS gained a promotion from Kakkonen to new Ykkönen.

On 13 November 2023, the club announced that they had signed a co-operation deal with one of their associate clubs Oulunsalon Pallo (OsPa), and acquired the control and the management of the OsPa first team in Kolmonen, as AC Oulu's second reserve team for youth players.

After the 2023 season, Olli-Pekka Piisilä, the head coach of the AC Oulu/OLS U17 team, was awarded The Best Coach of the Boys' Team by the Football Association of Finland.

== Management and boardroom ==
=== Management ===
As of 18 November 2023

Name	Role
(Finland) Mikko Isokangas	Head coach
(Brazil) (Finland) Rafinha	Assistant coach
(Finland) Mikko Lignell	Assistant coach
(Finland) Mikko Mannila	Reserve team head coach
(Spain) Jordi Aluja	Reserve team coach
(Finland) Jani Luukkonen	Goalkeeping coach
(England) Luke Robertson	Performance coach
(Finland) Olli Kyösti	Technical assistant
(Finland) Pasi Moilanen	Team manager
(Finland) Matias Ahola	Kit manager
(Finland) Ari Korkala	Physiotherapist
(Finland) Ville Puukka	Doctor

=== Boardroom ===
As of 23 November 2023

Name	Role
(Finland) Tomi Kaismo	Chairman
(Finland) Timo Kalermo	Vice chairman
(Finland) Jani Kotikangas	CEO
(Finland) Mika Nurmela	Sporting director

== Managers and captains ==
=== Managers ===
- (Finland) Ari Härkönen (2003–2004)
- (England) (Finland) Steven Polack (2005)
- (Finland) Harri Kampman (2006–2007)
- (Finland) Juha Malinen (2008–2012)
- (Finland) Rauno Ojanen (2013–2017)
- (Finland) Mika Lähderinne (2018–2019)
- (Finland) Rauno Ojanen (2019)
- (Finland) Jyrki Ahola (1 January 2020 – 25 September 2021)
- (Finland) Teemu Tavikainen (interim, 26 September 2021 – 5 October 2021)
- (Portugal) Ricardo Duarte (6 October 2021 – 24 August 2023)
- (Finland) Rauno Ojanen and (Finland) Jussi-Pekka Savolainen (interim, 2023)
- (Finland) Tuomas Silvennoinen (1 January 2024 – 13 June 2024)
- (Finland) Mikko Isokangas and (Brazil) / (Finland) Rafinha (caretaker)
- (Greece) Kostas Bratsos (20 June 2024 – 2 September 2024)
- (Finland) Mikko Isokangas and (Brazil) / (Finland) Rafinha (caretaker)

=== Captains ===
- (Finland) Aki Karppanen (2003)
- (Finland) Jani Sipilä (2004)
- (Finland) Mike Peltola (2005–2006)
- (Finland) Janne Hietanen (2007)
- (Finland) Antti Pehkonen 2008–2010
- (Zambia) Dominic Yobe (2010)
- (Finland) Jani Kauppila (2011–2012)
- (Finland) Lassi Nurmos (2013)
- (Finland) Pekka Räisänen (2014)
- (Finland) Tuure Siira (2015)
- (Finland) Lassi Nurmos (2016)
- (Chad) (Finland) David Ramadingaye (2017)
- (Finland) Lassi Nurmos (2018—2021)
- (Brazil) (Finland) Rafinha (2022)
- (Finland) Rasmus Karjalainen (2023)
- (Finland) Niklas Jokelainen (2024–2025)
- (Finland) Rasmus Karjalainen (2026–)

== Top goalscorers ==
Season	Player	G	League
2003	(Brazil) Jeferson Pires	12	Ykkönen
2004	(Brazil) Jeferson Pires	10	Ykkönen
2005	(Brazil) Jeferson Pires	5	Ykkönen
2005	(Finland) Jukka Puurunen	5	Ykkönen
2005	(Brazil) / (Finland) Rafinha	5	Ykkönen
2006	(Serbia) Dragan Pejic	15	Ykkönen
2007	(Finland) Janne Hietanen	5	Veikkausliiga
2008	(Zambia) Donewell Yobe	8	Ykkönen
2009	(Zambia) Donewell Yobe	14	Ykkönen
2010	(Canada) Frank Jonke	8	Veikkausliiga
2011	(Canada) Randy Edwini-Bonsu	16	Ykkönen
2012	(Finland) Joonas Sohlo	9	Ykkönen
2013	(Finland) Joonas Sohlo	7	Ykkönen
2014	(Finland) / (Albania) Dritan Stafsula	11	Ykkönen
2015	(The Gambia) Kemo Darboe	6	Ykkönen
2016	(Democratic Republic of the Congo) / (Finland) Aristote M'Boma	18	Ykkönen
2017	(Serbia) Saša Jovović	8	Ykkönen
2017	(Mexico) Alvarado Morín	8	Ykkönen
2018	(Mexico) Alvarado Morín	17	Ykkönen
2019	(Finland) Juho Mäkelä	11	Ykkönen
2020	(Finland) Aapo Heikkilä	9	Ykkönen
2021	(Liechtenstein) Dennis Salanović	4	Veikkausliiga
2021	(Nigeria) Lucky Opara	4	Veikkausliiga
2022	(Argentina) Michael López	10	Veikkausliiga
2023	(England) Ashley Coffey	13	Veikkausliiga
2024	(England) Ashley Coffey	12	Veikkausliiga
2025	(Finland) Julius Körkkö	6	Veikkausliiga
