= Adramane Cassamá =

Bissau-Guinean footballer (born 2004)

Personal information
- Date of birth: 16 January 2004 (age 22)
- Place of birth: Bissau, Guinea-Bissau
- Height: 1.80 m (5 ft 11 in)
- Position: Left back

Team information
- Current team: AC Oulu
- Number: 18

Youth career
- Benfica de Biss
- 2023–2024: Porto

Senior career*
Years	Team	Apps	(Gls)
2023–2024	Porto B	11	(0)
2025–	AC Oulu	34	(1)

International career^{‡}
2025–	Guinea-Bissau	1	(0)
- * Club domestic league appearances and goals as of 12 November 2026 ‡ National team caps and goals as of 8 September 2025

Adramane Cassamá (born 16 January 2004) is a Bissau-Guinean professional footballer who plays as a left back for Finnish Veikkausliiga club AC Oulu and for the Guinea-Bissau national team.

== Club career ==
After playing for Porto B, Cassamá moved to Finland and signed with Veikkausliiga club AC Oulu for the 2025 season.

== International career ==
In early September 2025, Cassamá received his first call-up to the Guinea-Bissau national team.

== Career statistics ==
=== Club ===
As of 16 July 2025

Appearances and goals by club, season and competition
Club	Season	League			National cup (Note: Includes Finnish Cup)		League cup (Note: Includes Finnish League Cup)		Continental		Total	
Club	Season	Division	Apps	Goals	Apps	Goals	Apps	Goals	Apps	Goals	Apps	Goals
Porto B	2023–24	Liga Portugal 2	11	0	0	0	–		–		11	0
Porto B	2024–25	Liga Portugal 2	0	0	0	0	–		–		0	0
Porto B	Total		11	0	0	0	0	0	0	0	11	0
AC Oulu	2025	Veikkausliiga	14	1	4	0	1	0	–		19	1
Career total			25	1	4	0	1	0	0	0	30	1

=== International ===
As of match played 8 September 2025

Appearances and goals by national team and year
National team	Year	Apps	Goals
Guinea-Bissau	2025	1	0
Total		1	0
