= Alex Lietsa =

Finnish footballer (born 2005)

Personal information
- Full name: Johan Alexander Lietsa
- Date of birth: 15 February 2005 (age 21)
- Place of birth: Finland
- Height: 1.85 m (6 ft 1 in)
- Position: Centre back

Team information
- Current team: AC Oulu
- Number: 3

Youth career
- –2018: PPJ
- 2018–2023: HJK

Senior career*
Years	Team	Apps	(Gls)
2023–2025	HJK	1	(0)
2023–2025	Klubi 04	47	(2)
2026–	AC Oulu	16	(0)

International career
2023	Finland U18	1	(0)
- * Club domestic league appearances and goals as of 12 November 2026

Johan Alexander Lietsa (born 15 February 2005) is a Finnish professional football centre back for Veikkausliiga club AC Oulu.
