= SPL Pohjois-Suomen piiri =

District organisation of the Football Association of Finland

Suomen Palloliiton Pohjois-Suomen piiri
- Abbreviation: SPL Pohjois-Suomi
- Purpose: District Football Association
- Location(s): Rautatienkatu 46 90120 Oulu Finland
- Director: Esa Saajanto
- Website: splps.fi

The SPL Pohjois-Suomen piiri (Northern Finland Football Association) was one of the 12 district organisations of the Football Association of Finland. It administered lower tier football in Northern Finland.

== Background ==
Suomen Palloliitto Pohjois-Suomen piiri, commonly referred to as SPL Pohjois-Suomen piiri or SPL Pohjois-Suomi, is the governing body for football in Northern Finland. Based in Oulu, the Association's Director is Esa Saajanto.

== Member clubs ==
Abbreviation	Settlement	Official name	Division	Cup	Other information
FC RAI 2	Oulu	FC RAI / 2	Vitonen	* *	
FC Santa Claus	Rovaniemi	FC Santa Claus	Kakkonen	* * *	Recent history: RoRe Rovaniemi until 1992; SantaClaus Rovaniemi since 1993 (merger with RoLa Rovaniemi); Tier 3 (23 seasons): 1978-81, 1984–89, 1991-2000, 2009-
FC Suola	Oulunsalo, Oulu	FC Suola	Vitonen	*	
FC Tarmo	Kajaani	FC Tarmo	Nelonen	* *	
FC-88	Kemi	FC-88 Kemi	Kolmonen	*	
HauPa	Haukipudas, Oulu	Haukiputaan Pallo	Kakkonen	* *	Tier 3 (2 seasons): 2000, 2011
HauPa 2	Haukipudas, Oulu	Haukiputaan Pallo / 2	Vitonen	*	
Herkku-Papat	Oulu	Herkku-Papat	Vitonen	*	
IVFC	Oulu	Inter Välivainio FC	Vitonen	* *	
JS Hercules	Oulu	Jalkapalloseura Hercules	Kolmonen	* *	
KajHa	Kajaani	Kajaanin Haka	Kolmonen	* * *	Tier 2 (9 seasons): 1968, 1970–71, 1985–86, 1993–94, 1998-99; Tier 3 (21 seasons): 1975, 1979, 1981–84, 1987, 1990–92, 1995–97, 2000–05, 2007, 2010
KemPa	Keminmaa	Keminmaan Pallo	Nelonen	* *	
KiiRi	Kiiminki, Oulu	Kiimingin Riento	Vitonen	*	
Kolarin Kontio	Kolari	Kolarin Kontio	Nelonen	*	
MuhU	Muhos	Muhoksen Urheilijat	Vitonen	*	
OPS	Oulu	Oulun Palloseura	Ykkönen	* * *	
OPS-juniorit	Oulu	Oulun Palloseura juniorit	Kolmonen	*	
OTP	Oulu	Oulun Työväen Palloilijat	Kolmonen	*	
OuJK	Oulu	Oulun Jalkapalloklubi	Nelonen	*	
OuRe	Oulu	Oulun Reipas	Nelonen	* *	
OuTa	Oulu	Oulun Tarmo	Nelonen	* *	
PaKa	Paavola, Siikajoki	Paavolan Kisa	Vitonen	* *	
PaPa	Pasmajärvi, Kolari	Pasmajärven Palloilijat	Nelonen	*	
PaTe	Pattijoki, Raahe	Pattijoen Tempaus	Nelonen	*	
PaTe 2	Raahe	Pattijoen Tempaus / 2	Vitonen	*	
PS Kemi Kings	Kemi	Palloseura Kemi Kings	Kakkonen	* * *	
PS Kemi 2	Kemi	Palloseura Kemi Kings / 2	Kolmonen	*	
RoPS	Rovaniemi	Rovaniemi Palloseura	Veikkausliiga	* * *	
SoPa	Sodankylä	Sodankylän Pallo	Nelonen	*	
Spartak Kajaani	Kajaani	Spartak Kajaani	Kolmonen	* *	
Tervarit	Oulu	Tervarit	Kolmonen	* *	
ToTa	Tornio	Tornion Tarmo	Kolmonen	*	
TP-47	Tornio	Tornion Pallo-47	Kakkonen	* * *	

== League Competitions ==
SPL Pohjois-Suomen piiri run the following league competitions:

=== Men's Football ===
- Division 3 - Kolmonen - one section
- Division 4 - Nelonen - two sections
- Division 5 - Vitonen - one section

=== Ladies Football ===
- Division 3 - Kolmonen - one section
