= Jyrki Ahola =

Finnish football manager (born 1971)

Personal information
- Date of birth: 29 November 1971 (age 54)
- Place of birth: Riihimäki, Finland

Team information
- Current team: Ilves (scout)

Managerial career
- Years: Team
- 2018–2019: Klubi 04 (assistant)
- 2020–2021: AC Oulu
- 2022: RiPS
- 2023: JäPS
- 2023–2025: Ilves (scout)
- 2025–: Inter Turku (scout)

Jyrki Ahola (born 29 November 1971) is a Finnish football coach. He is currently working as a scout for Veikkausliiga club Inter Turku. Ahola has obtained a UEFA Pro -coaching license.

== Career ==
Ahola started his coaching career in his hometown club Riihimäen Palloseura (RiPS) in 1987.

In 2001, he joined HJK Helsinki organisation.

He has worked as a coaching director of Kuusysi in 2017, and as an assistant coach for Mikko Mannila in HJK Klubi 04 in 2018–2019.

Ahola was named the manager of AC Oulu in late 2019 on a two-year deal with a one-year option, starting in the 2020 Ykkönen season in Finnish second-tier. He managed the club to win the Ykkönen title and earn a promotion to Veikkausliiga. The next season in the top-tier was difficult for the team and eventually he was dismissed in September 2021.

Later in the same year, he returned to his hometown Riihimäki and was named the coaching director and the first team head coach of his former club RiPS in the fourth-tier Kolmonen. In the early 2022, while coaching a training session for the team, Ahola suffered a life-threatening heart attack, and survived the incident after a 48-minute-long resuscitation.

He was named the head coach of Järvenpään Palloseura (JäPS) for the 2023 Ykkönen season, winning a pre-season league cup, Ykköscup, title. However, he was forced to leave the club in the late May, for personal health reasons.

Since November 2023, Ahola has worked in the scouting team of Veikkausliiga club Ilves.

On 22 January 2025, Ahola joined the scouting team of Veikkausliiga club Inter Turku.

== Managerial statistics ==
As of 28 May 2023

| Team | Nat | From | To | Record | | | | | | | |
| Team | Nat | From | To | P | W | D | L | GF | GA | GD | W% |
|---|---|---|---|---|---|---|---|---|---|---|---|
| AC Oulu | (Finland) | 1 January 2020 | 25 September 2021 | 52 | 24 | 10 | 18 | 70 | 60 | +10 | 46.15 |
| RiPS | (Finland) | 1 January 2022 | 31 December 2022 | 15 | 4 | 2 | 9 | 25 | 36 | −11 | 26.67 |
| JäPS | (Finland) | 1 January 2023 | 28 May 2023 | 15 | 10 | 0 | 5 | 34 | 22 | +12 | 66.67 |
| Total | | | | 82 | 38 | 12 | 32 | 129 | 118 | +11 | 46.34 |

== Honours ==
AC Oulu

- Ykkönen: 2020

JäPS

- Ykköscup: 2023
