= Iiro Mendolin =

Finnish footballer (born 2006)

Personal information
- Date of birth: 25 May 2006 (age 20)
- Place of birth: Finland
- Position: Midfielder

Team information
- Current team: AC Oulu
- Number: 21

Youth career
- –2020: KaaPo
- 2021–2022: Inter Turku
- 2022–2025: Groningen

Senior career*
Years	Team	Apps	(Gls)
2025–	AC Oulu	35	(2)
2025–	→ OLS (loan)	1	(0)

International career^{‡}
2021–2022	Finland U16	6	(1)
2022	Finland U17	11	(1)
2023–2024	Finland U18	5	(0)
2024–2025	Finland U19	5	(0)
- * Club domestic league appearances and goals as of 12 November 2026 ‡ National team caps and goals as of 1 April 2026

Iiro Mendolin (born 25 May 2006) is a Finnish professional footballer who plays as a midfielder for Veikkausliiga club AC Oulu.

== Club career ==
Mendolin started football in Kaarinan Pojat youth sector. He joined a youth team of Inter Turku in 2021, and a year later he moved to the Netherlands and joined the youth academy of Groningen.

On 21 May 2025, Finnish Veikkausliiga club AC Oulu announced the signing of Mendolin on a two-year deal with a two-year option. He scored his first league goal on 18 April 2026, the winning goal in a 1–0 home win over Vaasan Palloseura.

== Personal life ==
His younger brother Rasmus plays for Inter Turku II team.
