= Donewell Yobe =

Zambian footballer (born 1983)

Personal information
- Date of birth: 24 August 1983 (age 43)
- Place of birth: Lusaka, Zambia
- Height: 1.80 m (5 ft 11 in)
- Position: Striker

Senior career*
Years	Team	Apps	(Gls)
2003–2006	Lusaka Dynamos		
2007	ZESCO United		
2008–2010	AC Oulu	65	(29)

International career
2006	Zambia	1	(0)
- * Club domestic league appearances and goals as of 8 May 2011

Donewell Yobe (born 24 August 1983) is a Zambian former footballer who played as a striker.

== Career ==
Yobe played club football in both Zambia and Finland, appearing for Lusaka Dynamos, ZESCO United and AC Oulu. While signed to AC Oulu, Yobe was convicted of match-fixing, alongside brother Dominic.

Yobe also earned one international cap for Zambia in 2006.
