= Ricardo Duarte (born 1980) =

Portuguese football manager (born 1980)

Personal information
- Full name: Ricardo Filipe Lima Duarte
- Date of birth: 12 February 1980 (age 46)
- Place of birth: Barcelos, Portugal

Managerial career
- Years: Team
- 2007–2008: Juventude de Évora (assistant)
- 2016–2017: Vitória de Setúbal (assistant)
- 2018: VPS (assistant)
- 2020–2021: Gnistan
- 2021–2023: AC Oulu
- 2023–2024: Vianense
- 2024: Lahti
- 2026: Sreenidi Deccan (assistant)

Ricardo Filipe Lima Duarte (born 12 February 1980) is a Portuguese football manager.

== Coaching career ==
Duarte has worked as an assistant professor in the University of Lisbon, teaching football in the Faculty of Human Motricity. He worked also as an assistant coach of Primeira Liga club Vitória de Setúbal in the 2016–17 season.

Duarte moved to Finland in 2018 and worked as an assistant coach of Petri Vuorinen in Vaasan Palloseura (VPS). Later in the Autumn 2018, he was named the training director of the Football Association of Finland. On 4 August 2020, Duarte was appointed the head coach of IF Gnistan in Finnish second-tier Ykkönen.

In October 2021, Duarte was named the new manager of Veikkausliiga club AC Oulu, after the sacking of Jyrki Ahola. He managed to secure the league spot for the club after defeating Rovaniemen Palloseura (RoPS) in the relegation play-offs. At the end of the next 2022 season, Duarte managed AC Oulu to finish 7th in Veikkausliiga, after having narrowly missed the top-6. In the 2023 Finnish League Cup, Duarte led the club to the final, where they were eventually defeated by HJK. During the 2023 Veikkausliiga season, he helped the club to establish themselves in the league, but on 17 August 2023, it was announced that he would leave AC Oulu after the season as his option was not exercised. However, on 25 August 2023, his contract was terminated with the immediate effect after the loss against Ilves in the semi-final of the 2023 Finnish Cup and the poor results in the league.

On 30 October 2023, Duarte returned to Portugal when he was appointed the head coach of Vianense in Liga 3. He was dismissed on 29 January 2024 after nine league matches, with a record of one win, three draws and five losses.

On 21 June 2024, he was named the manager of FC Lahti in Veikkausliiga, after the sacking of Toni Lindberg. The club had performed poorly and were close to the relegation zone. With Duarte as a manager, Lahti had few promising results, but in the end they finished 11th in the league. Duarte couldn't help the club from relegating, after being defeated 2–1 by FF Jaro in the relegation play-offs in late October.

== Managerial statistics ==
As of 9 November 2024

Team	Nat	From	To	Record							
Team	Nat	From	To	P	W	D	L	GF	GA	GD	W%
Gnistan	(Finland)	4 August 2020	5 October 2021	45	20	6	19	81	79	+2	44.44
AC Oulu	(Finland)	6 October 2021	24 August 2023	74	33	15	26	129	116	+13	44.59
Vianense	(Portugal)	30 October 2023	29 January 2024	9	1	3	5	4	12	−8	11.11
Lahti	(Finland)	21 June 2024	31 December 2024	18	4	7	7	22	28	−6	22.22
Total				146	58	31	57	236	234	+2	39.73
