= Dominic Yobe =

Zambian footballer (born 1986)

Personal information
- Date of birth: 4 August 1986 (age 40)
- Place of birth: Lusaka, Zambia
- Height: 1.75 m (5 ft 9 in)
- Position: Midfielder

Senior career*
Years	Team	Apps	(Gls)
2004–2007	Örgryte	41	(1)
2007–2010	AC Oulu	75	(16)
2011	HJK	0	(0)
- * Club domestic league appearances and goals as of 12 August 2010

Dominic Yobe (born 4 August 1986) is a Zambian footballer. His elder brother Donewell is also a professional footballer.

Yobe represented Swedish Örgryte between 2004 and 2007 before signing with AC Oulu. He helped the team to win promotion to Veikkausliiga. On his first Veikkausliiga season in 2010, Dominic was named team captain. In November 2010, he signed a two-year contract with the reigning champions HJK. Yobe's contract was terminated in March 2011 after he was suspected of being involved in a match fixing scandal along with his brother and several other players. He was convicted to a seven-month suspended sentence for bribery.
