= Sampo Ala-Iso =

Finnish footballer (born 2003)

Personal information
- Date of birth: 6 March 2003 (age 23)
- Place of birth: Tornio, Finland
- Position: Centre back

Team information
- Current team: OLS

Youth career
- KePS
- –2019: TP-47

Senior career*
Years	Team	Apps	(Gls)
2019	TP-47	8	(0)
2020–2021	RoPS II	27	(1)
2021	RoPS	3	(0)
2022–2024	Gnistan	41	(1)
2023	→ NJS (loan)	1	(1)
2024	→ PKKU (loan)	5	(0)
2024	KPV	11	(0)
2025–	OLS	41	(1)

International career
2018	Finland U16	3	(0)
Medal record
RoPS
Second place	Ykkönen	2021
Gnistan
Second place	Ykkönen	2023
- * Club domestic league appearances and goals as of 7 November 2026

Sampo Ala-Iso (born 6 March 2003) is a Finnish professional football player who plays as a centre back for Ykkönen side OLS.

== Career ==
Ala-Iso played in the youth sectors of Kemin Palloseura and TP-47, before moving to Rovaniemi when aged 16 and joining Rovaniemen Palloseura (RoPS).

On 29 January 2022, Ala-Iso signed a two-year deal with IF Gnistan, playing in the second-tier level Ykkönen. At the end of the 2023 season, Gnistan won promotion to Veikkausliiga, and on 12 December 2023, the club exercised their option to extend Ala Iso's contract for the 2024 season.

On 10 July 2024, he signed with KPV in Ykkönen.

== International career ==
Ala-Iso represented Finland at the under-16 youth international level on three occasions.

== Career statistics ==
As of 7 November 2026

Appearances and goals by club, season and competition
Club	Season	League			National cup (Note: Includes Suomen Cup)		Other (Note: Includes Promotion playoff matches in Ykkönnen)		Continental		Total	
Club	Season	Division	Apps	Goals	Apps	Goals	Apps	Goals	Apps	Goals	Apps	Goals
TP-47	2019	Kolmonen	8	0	—		—		—		8	0
RoPS II	2020	Kakkonen	5	1	—		—		—		5	1
RoPS II	2021	Kakkonen	22	0	—		—		—		22	0
RoPS II	Total		27	1	0	0	0	0	0	0	27	1
RoPS	2021	Ykkönen	3	0	3	0	—		—		6	0
Gnistan	2022	Ykkönen	21	0	1	0	2 (Note: Includes Ykkönen Cup)	0	—		24	0
Gnistan	2023	Ykkönen	20	1	3	0	6	0	—		29	1
Gnistan	2024	Veikkausliiga	0	0	2	0	5 (Note: Includes Finnish League Cup)	1	—		7	1
Gnistan	Total		41	1	6	0	13	1	0	0	60	2
NJS (loan)	2023	Kakkonen	1	1	—		—		—		1	1
PKKU (loan)	2024	Ykkönen	5	0	—		—		—		5	0
KPV	2024	Ykkönen	11	0	—		—		—		11	0
OLS	2025	Ykkönen	25	0	2	0	2	0	—		29	0
OLS	2026	Ykkönen	16	1	0	0	—		—		16	1
OLS	Total		41	1	2	0	2	0	0	0	45	1
Career total			137	4	11	0	15	1	0	0	163	5

== Honours ==
Gnistan

- Ykkönen runner-up: 2023

KPV

- Ykkönen runner-up: 2024
