= Nuottasaari =

- District of Oulu
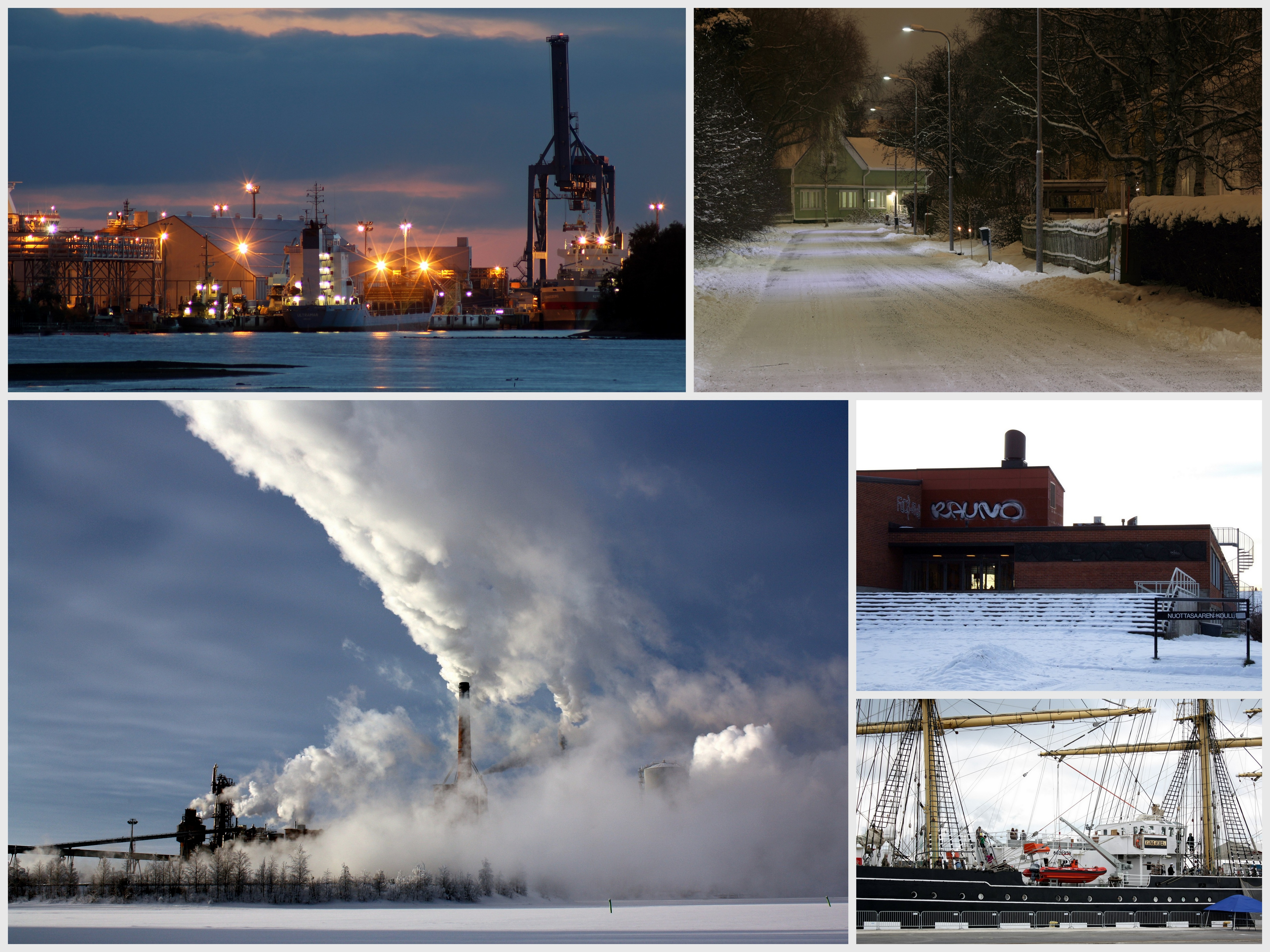
- Interactive map of Nuottasaari
- Country: Finland
- City: Oulu
- Areas of Oulu: Nuottasaari area

Population (2013)
  - Total: 372
- Postal code: 90120

Nuottasaari is a district of Oulu, Finland. It is located south of the city centre of Oulu. Nuottasaari is bounded by the delta of the Oulujoki river in the Northwest, the Bothnian Bay and the Äimärautio district in the South and the Limingantulli, Leveri and Hollihaka districts in the East.

Nuottasaari is mainly industrial area with the Stora Enso pulp and paper mill dominating the scene. The Oritkari and Nuottasaari harbours of the Port of Oulu are located in the district. There is a small residential area along the Niilontie and Aleksanterinkatu streets in the northern part of the district, but all in all, there are only 372 residents in the district. The Heinäpää Sports Centre is located in Nuottasaari. There are municipal facilities for indoor and outdoor association football, skateboarding, athletics, cross-country skiing, ice hockey, rink bandy and snow boarding.
