= JS Hercules =

Association football club in Finland

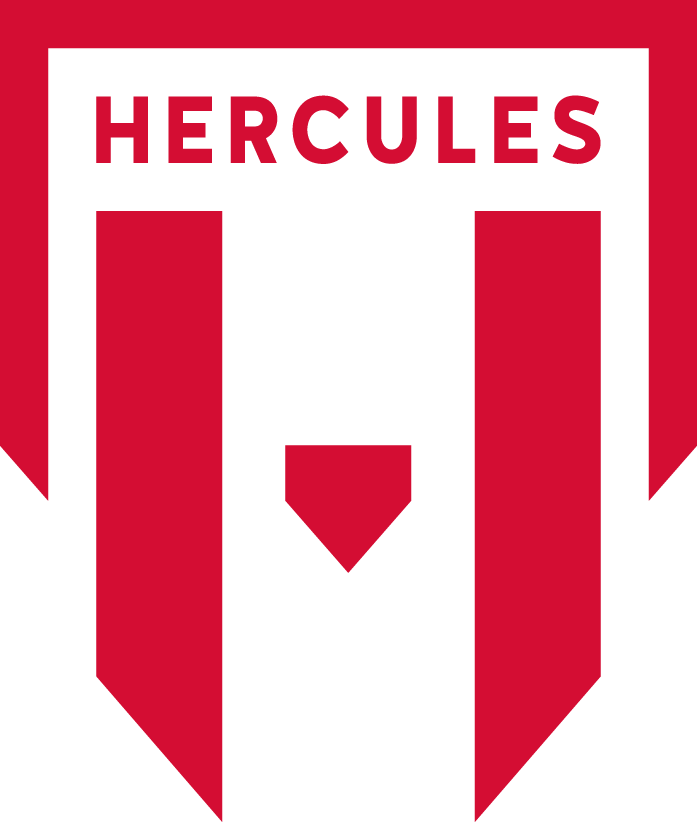
- Full name: Jalkapalloseura Hercules ry.
- Nickname: Herkku
- Founded: 1998; 28 years ago
- Ground: Castrén
- Chairman: Marko Halmekangas
- Manager: Conor Edwards
- League: Kolmonen
- 2026: Kakkonen Group C, 9th of 10 (relegated)
- Website: http://www.jshercules.com/
Home colours	Away colours	Third colours

JS Hercules is an association football club based in Oulu, Finland. Founded in 1998, the team started at the lowest level of the Finnish league system and was playing in the Third Division until promoted to Finnish Second Division, Kakkonen, for the first time for season 2016.

== History ==
When Hercules played their first matches in 1998, some of the players had never previously played in a football club. Some had a little background in their local youth teams and nothing else. The team's core was a group of students mostly from the Faculty of Technology at the University of Oulu. This first generation is almost gone, but a couple are still playing for the reserve team, Herkku-Papat, or manage the team business in the background. Younger ranks are now taking care of the first team efforts on the field.

== Season to season ==
Season to season of Hercules

Season	Level	Division	Section	Administration	Position	
1998	Tier 5	Nelonen (Fourth Division)	Group 1	Northern District (SPL Pohjois-Suomi)	5th	
1999	Tier 5	Nelonen (Fourth Division)	Premilinary Group	Northern District (SPL Pohjois-Suomi)	2nd	Promotion Group 3rd
2000	Tier 5	Nelonen (Fourth Division)	Premilinary Group	Northern District (SPL Pohjois-Suomi)		Promotion Group 2nd - Promoted
2001	Tier 4	Kolmonen (Third Division)	Oulu/Kainuu	Northern District (SPL Pohjois-Suomi)	7th	
2002	Tier 4	Kolmonen (Third Division)	Oulu	Northern District (SPL Pohjois-Suomi)	7th	
2003	Tier 4	Kolmonen (Third Division)	Group A	Northern District (SPL Pohjois-Suomi)	8th	Relegated
2004	Tier 5	Nelonen (Fourth Division)	Oulu	Northern District (SPL Pohjois-Suomi)	2nd	
2005	Tier 5	Nelonen (Fourth Division)	Oulu	Northern District (SPL Pohjois-Suomi)	6th	
2006	Tier 5	Nelonen (Fourth Division)	Group A	Northern District (SPL Pohjois-Suomi)	9th	
2007	Tier 5	Nelonen (Fourth Division)	Oulu	Northern District (SPL Pohjois-Suomi)	7th	
2008	Tier 5	Nelonen (Fourth Division)	Oulu	Northern District (SPL Pohjois-Suomi)	10th	
2009	Tier 5	Nelonen (Fourth Division)	Oulu	Northern District (SPL Pohjois-Suomi)	9th	
2010	Tier 5	Nelonen (Fourth Division)	Oulu	Northern District (SPL Pohjois-Suomi)	2nd	Promoted
2011	Tier 4	Kolmonen (Third Division)	Northern Finland	Northern District (SPL Pohjois-Suomi)	6th	
2012	Tier 4	Kolmonen (Third Division)	Northern Finland	Northern District (SPL Pohjois-Suomi)	7th	
2013	Tier 4	Kolmonen (Third Division)	Northern Finland	Northern District (SPL Pohjois-Suomi)	7th	
2014	Tier 4	Kolmonen (Third Division)	Northern Finland	Northern District (SPL Pohjois-Suomi)	7th	
2015	Tier 4	Kolmonen (Third Division)	Northern Finland	Northern District (SPL Pohjois-Suomi)	2nd	Promoted
2016	Tier 3	Kakkonen (Second Division)	Group C	Finnish FA (Suomen Pallolitto)	8th	
2017	Tier 3	Kakkonen (Second Division)	Group C	Finnish FA (Suomen Pallolitto)	5th	
2018	Tier 3	Kakkonen (Second Division)	Group C	Finnish FA (Suomen Pallolitto)	4th	
2019	Tier 3	Kakkonen (Second Division)	Group C	Finnish FA (Suomen Pallolitto)	9th	
2020	Tier 3	Kakkonen (Second Division)	Group C	Finnish FA (Suomen Pallolitto)	2nd	
2021	Tier 3	Kakkonen (Second Division)	Group C	Finnish FA (Suomen Pallolitto)	3rd	
2022	Tier 3	Kakkonen (Second Division)	Group C	Finnish FA (Suomen Pallolitto)	3rd	
2023	Tier 3	Kakkonen (Second Division)	Group C	Finnish FA (Suomen Pallolitto)	11th	
2024	Tier 4	Kakkonen (Second Division)	Group C	Finnish FA (Suomen Pallolitto)	7th	
2025	Tier 4	Kakkonen (Second Division)	Group C	Finnish FA (Suomen Pallolitto)	7th	
2026	Tier 4	Kakkonen (Second Division)	Group C	Finnish FA (Suomen Pallolitto)		

- 8 seasons in Third tier
- 11 seasons in Fourth tier
- 10 seasons in Fifth tier

== Current season ==
The club currently plays in Group C of the fourth tier Kakkonen. The reserve team, Hercules-j, plays in the fifth tier Kolmonen.

== Current squad ==
As of 21 April 2026 Note: Flags indicate national team as defined under FIFA eligibility rules; some limited exceptions apply. Players may hold more than one non-FIFA nationality.

No.	Pos.	Nation	Player
1	GK	FIN	Joonas Niinivaara
2	DF	FIN	Kasper Rauma
3	DF	FIN	Akseli Kantola
4	DF	FIN	Santeri Vaihoja
5	DF	FIN	Niko Haapalainen
6	MF	FIN	Ahti Karppelin
7	FW	FIN	Julius Yliniemelä
8	MF	FIN	Eeka Huitsi
9	FW	FIN	Joonas Kurvinen
10	MF	FIN	Konsta Sarajärvi
11	FW	FIN	Sebastian Ukura
13	DF	FIN	Elias Kotilainen
14	MF	MAR	Saad Allali Atifi
17	MF	AUS	Gus Higgins

No.	Pos.	Nation	Player
18	MF	FIN	Saku Sipola
19	FW	FIN	Vertti Korkala
20	MF	FIN	Juho Kärsämä
21	FW	NGR	Adamu Aliyu
22	DF	FIN	Eino Salmela
23	FW	FIN	Aapo Pähti
24	DF	NGR	Alexander Jibrin
28	MF	FIN	Sisu Tervaoja
29	DF	FIN	Antti-Jussi Riihiaho
30	DF	FIN	Albertti Jauhiainen
72	GK	FIN	Eelis Taavettila
98	DF	FIN	Lenni Matikainen
–	MF	FIN	Eetu Keskitalo

== Outside the pitch ==
JS Hercules has combined football and business in creating a yearly seminar, FootCoop, which brings together teams and businesses from Northern Fennoscandia with exceptional speakers. The 2012 seminar featured Brian Deane, Tom Saintfiet, Martti Kuusela, Tom Markham, Jarmo Kekäläinen, Aki Riihilahti and Miguel Huhta, and others. At the same time they organized "Sister City Football Tournament" which included teams from Oulu's sister cities and other neighboring places like Alta IF, AC Oulu, RoPS and Bodens BK. In 2017, the club entered into a partnership with Indian I-League club Chennai City.
