= Iiro Sopanen =

Finnish ice hockey player

- Born: September 20, 1989 (age 35); Lahti, Finland
- Height: 6 ft 3 in (191 cm)
- Weight: 209 lb (95 kg; 14 st 13 lb)
- Position: Forward
- Shot: Left
- Played for: Pelicans
- NHL draft: Undrafted
- Playing career: 2008–2019

Iiro Sopanen is a Finnish professional ice hockey forward who currently plays for Pelicans of the SM-liiga. He is the younger brother of Vili Sopanen, another Finnish hockey player.
