= 2020 Ykkönen =

Ykkönen
- Season: 2020
- Champions: Oulu
- Promoted: Oulu; KPT
- Relegated: Kajaani; SJK Akatemia; MYPA

The 2020 Ykkönen was the 49th season of Ykkönen, the second highest football league in Finland. The season began on 18 April 2020.

== New league format ==
Ykkönen adopted a new league format for the 2020 season. The number of teams was raised from ten to twelve, and promotion series and relegation series will be played after the regular season. Each team will play against each other twice in the regular season. After the regular season the top six teams advanced to the Promotion Series which determines the champion and Veikkausliiga promotion places. The bottom six teams advanced to the relegation series.

The 1st team from the Promotion Series will promote to the Veikkausliiga. The 3rd placed team from the Promotion Series plays against 4th placed team, and the winner of that match plays against 2nd placed team for place in the Veikkausliiga promotion play-offs against 11th placed team from Veikkausliiga.

The bottom 3 teams from the relegation series will relegate to the Kakkonen.

== Overview ==
Location of teams in Ykkönen 2020

A total of twelve teams will contest in the league, including seven sides from the 2019 season, VPS and KPV were relegated from Veikkausliiga and Gnistan, MP and SJK Akatemia who were promoted from Kakkonen after winning the promotion play-offs.

Club	Location	Stadium	Capacity	Manager
AC Kajaani	Kajaani	Kajaanin Liikuntapuisto	1,200	(Finland) Mika Lumijärvi
AC Oulu	Oulu	Raatin Stadion	6,996	(Finland) Jyrki Ahola
EIF	Raseborg	Ekenäs Centrumplan	2,500	(Spain) Guillem Santesmases
FF Jaro	Jakobstad	Jakobstads Centralplan	4,600	(Finland) Niklas Käcko
Gnistan	Helsinki	Mustapekka Areena	1,100	(Portugal) Ricardo Duarte
KPV	Kokkola	Kokkolan Keskuskenttä	2,000	(Finland) Jani Uotinen
KTP	Kotka	Arto Tolsa Areena	4,780	(Estonia) Argo Arbeiter
MP	Mikkeli	Mikkelin Urheilupuisto	7,000	(Finland) Juha Pasoja
MuSa	Pori	Porin Stadion	12,300	(Finland) Ville Ulanen
MYPA	Kouvola	Kymenlaakson Sähkö Stadion	4,167	(Finland) Ilkka Mäkelä
SJK Akatemia	Seinäjoki	OmaSP Stadion	6,000	(Republic of Ireland) Tommy Dunne
VPS	Vaasa	Elisa Stadion	6,000	(Finland) Christian Sund

== League table ==
Pos	Team	Pld	W	D	L	GF	GA	GD	Pts	Promotion or qualification
1	Oulu (P)	22	15	5	2	38	16	+22	50	Promotion to 2021 Veikkausliiga
2	KTP (O, P)	22	14	5	3	51	23	+28	47	Qualification to Veikkausliiga promotion play-offs
3	Jaro	22	12	5	5	50	31	+19	41	
4	EIF	22	10	6	6	45	25	+20	36	
5	MuSa	22	10	4	8	38	38	0	34	
6	VPS	22	9	6	7	37	36	+1	33	
7	MP	22	8	5	9	29	35	−6	29	
8	KPV	22	8	4	10	38	34	+4	28	
9	Gnistan	22	7	4	11	38	49	−11	25	
10	Kajaani (R)	22	5	8	9	35	37	−2	23	Relegation to 2021 Kakkonen
11	SJK Akatemia (R)	22	4	3	15	22	49	−27	15	Relegation to 2021 Kakkonen
12	MYPA (R)	22	1	3	18	21	69	−48	6	Relegation to 2021 Kakkonen

Source: Soccerway
Rules for classification: 1) Points; 2) Goal difference; 3) Goals scored
(O) Play-off winners; (P) Promoted; (R) Relegated

== Results ==
Home \ Away	EIF	GNI	JAR	KAJ	KPV	KTP	MP	MUS	MYP	OUL	SJK	VPS
EIF	—		5–1									0–0
Gnistan		—	1–2			0–3	0–1					
Jaro			—				3–0		1–0		3–0	6–1
Kajaani	0–2	1–1	2–2	—						1–1		
KPV	2–2		0–4		—	1–1				0–1	4–0	
KTP			1–1			—	2–3	0–0	3–2			
MP				2–1	1–2		—	1–2				
MuSa	1–0	5–1		0–2				—				
MYPA				0–0					—	1–2		
Oulu		2–0	2–1							—	1–0	1–0
SJK Akatemia	0–3	2–2				0–3		0–2			—	
VPS					4–1			1–1	1–0		3–1	—

Updated to match(es) played on 6 August 2020. Source: Soccerway
Legend: Blue = home team win; Yellow = draw; Red = away team win.
