= 2006 Ykkönen =

Finnish League Division 1
- Season: 2006

League tables for teams participating in Ykkönen, the second tier of the Finnish football league system, in 2006.

== League table ==
Pos	Team	Pld	W	D	L	GF	GA	GD	Pts	Promotion or relegation
1	FC Viikingit (C, P)	26	17	5	4	65	25	+40	56	Promotion to Veikkausliiga
2	AC Oulu (P)	26	15	7	4	53	25	+28	52	Promotion to Veikkausliiga
3	Atlantis FC	26	13	8	5	49	34	+15	47	
4	TP-47	26	12	5	9	35	25	+10	41	
5	Jippo	26	11	8	7	33	34	−1	41	
6	Klubi-04	26	11	5	10	49	27	+22	38	
7	RoPS	26	10	8	8	40	35	+5	38	
8	VIFK	26	9	8	9	45	46	−1	35	
9	KPV	26	8	9	9	42	47	−5	33	
10	PK-35	26	6	12	8	33	39	−6	30	
11	FC Hämeenlinna	26	6	10	10	35	35	0	28	
12	PP-70	26	6	7	13	28	51	−23	25	
13	MP (R)	26	7	3	16	30	54	−24	24	Relegation to Kakkonen
14	Rakuunat (R)	26	2	3	21	14	74	−60	9	Relegation to Kakkonen

(C) Champions; (P) Promoted; (R) Relegated

=== League Movements ===
Two teams were directly promoted to the Veikkausliiga (and only two teams were relegated to the Kakkonen) because Allianssi Vantaa withdrew from the Veikkausliiga and they were not replaced by another club.
