= Haukiputaan Pallo =

Finnish football club

- Full name: Haukiputaan Pallo
- Nickname(s): HauPa
- Founded: 1993
- Ground: Haukiputaan keskuskenttä, Haukipudas, Oulu, Finland
- League: Kolmonen
Home colours	Away colours

Haukiputaan Pallo ry (abbreviated HauPa) is a football club from Haukipudas, Oulu, Finland. The club was formed in 1993 and their home ground is at the Haukiputaan keskuskenttä. The men's first team got promoted after 2010 season and currently plays in the Kakkonen (Second Division).

== Background ==
HauPa was established in 1993 and with one exception have spent their short history in the lower divisions of the Finnish football league. The club's main achievement to date is one season in the third tier of Finnish football, the Kakkonen (Second Division), in 2000. Their stay at the higher level was short lived and the club then dropped back into the Kolmonen (Third Division) in 2001 where they have remained for the last decade.

The club has grown significantly since its early beginnings and now runs 16 teams with more than 370 registered players and about 1,000 members in total. A huge achievement for the club has been the development of the HauPa Halli which provides year-round training in a quality environment including the latest in artificial grass technology. The field dimensions are 22.5 metres wide by 48.5 metres high. The height of the building is 8.4 metres at the highest point of the arc. In addition to the training area there is a sauna, cafeteria and meeting rooms.

== Season to season ==
Season	Level	Division	Section	Administration	Position	Movements
2000	Tier 3	Kakkonen (Second Division)	North Group	Finnish FA (Suomen Pallolitto)	12th	Relegated
2001	Tier 4	Kolmonen (Third Division)	Oulu / Kainuu	Northern Finland (SPL Pohjois-Suomi)	4th	
2002	Tier 4	Kolmonen (Third Division)	Oulu / Kainuu	Northern Finland (SPL Pohjois-Suomi)	2nd	
2003	Tier 4	Kolmonen (Third Division)	Section A	Northern Finland (SPL Pohjois-Suomi)	2nd	
2004	Tier 4	Kolmonen (Third Division)	Oulu / Kainuu	Northern Finland (SPL Pohjois-Suomi)	4th	
2005	Tier 4	Kolmonen (Third Division)		Northern Finland (SPL Pohjois-Suomi)	6th	
2006	Tier 4	Kolmonen (Third Division)		Northern Finland (SPL Pohjois-Suomi)	3rd	
2007	Tier 4	Kolmonen (Third Division)		Northern Finland (SPL Pohjois-Suomi)	6th	
2008	Tier 4	Kolmonen (Third Division)		Northern Finland (SPL Pohjois-Suomi)	7th	
2009	Tier 4	Kolmonen (Third Division)		Northern Finland (SPL Pohjois-Suomi)	6th	
2010	Tier 4	Kolmonen (Third Division)		Northern Finland (SPL Pohjois-Suomi)	1st	Promoted

- 1 season in Kakkonen
- 10 seasons in Kolmonen

== Club Structure ==
Haukiputaan Pallo run a large number of teams including 2 men's team, 10 boys' teams and 4 girls' teams. In addition the FC Rauha club also form part of the HauPa structure.
