= 2001 UEFA European Under-16 Championship squads =

Football tournament squads

Below are the rosters for the 2001 UEFA European Under-16 Football Championship tournament in England.

== Group A ==
=== Belgium ===
Head coach: Patrick Klinkenberg

No.	Pos.	Player	Date of birth (age)	Caps	Goals	Club
1	GK	Glenn Verbauwhede	19 May 1985 (aged 15)			(Royal Belgian Football Association) Club Brugge
2	DF	Gunther Vanaudenaerde	23 January 1984 (aged 17)			(Royal Belgian Football Association) Club Brugge
3	DF	Bram De Ly	21 January 1984 (aged 17)			(Royal Belgian Football Association) Club Brugge
4	DF	Jan Wuytens	9 June 1985 (aged 15)			(Royal Dutch Football Association) PSV Eindhoven
5	DF	Kristof Goessens	13 October 1985 (aged 15)			(Royal Belgian Football Association) Standard Liège
6	MF	Vincent Provoost	4 February 1984 (aged 17)			(Royal Belgian Football Association) Club Brugge
7	FW	Lokman Atasever	31 March 1984 (aged 17)			(Royal Belgian Football Association) R. Charleroi S.C.
8	MF	Jonathan Blondel	3 April 1984 (aged 17)			(Royal Belgian Football Association) Mouscron
9	DF	Dieter Van Tornhout	18 March 1985 (aged 16)			(Royal Belgian Football Association) Club Brugge
10	FW	Kevin Amond	19 September 1984 (aged 16)			(Royal Belgian Football Association) KV Oostende
11	MF	Maxence Coveliers	23 February 1984 (aged 17)			(Royal Belgian Football Association) Molenbeek
12	GK	Kersten Lauwerijs	23 February 1984 (aged 17)			(Royal Belgian Football Association) KV Mechelen
13	DF	Sven Ardeel	2 August 1984 (aged 16)			(Royal Belgian Football Association) KAA Gent
14	DF	Stéphane Ronge	6 May 1984 (aged 16)			(Royal Belgian Football Association) Lierse S.K.
15	MF	Wouter Vandendriessche	27 June 1984 (aged 16)			(Royal Belgian Football Association) Club Brugge
16	FW	Davy Sroka	17 August 1984 (aged 16)			(Royal Dutch Football Association) PSV Eindhoven
17	FW	Bram Oostvogels	22 September 1984 (aged 16)			(Royal Belgian Football Association) KRC Genk
18	FW	Dries Bernaert	21 August 1984 (aged 16)			(Royal Belgian Football Association) KAA Gent

=== Germany ===
Head coach: Klaus Sammer

No.	Pos.	Player	Date of birth (age)	Caps	Goals	Club
1	GK	René Adler	15 January 1985 (aged 16)			(German Football Association) Bayer Leverkusen II
2	DF	Christian Petereit	1 February 1984 (aged 17)			(German Football Association) Schalke 04 II
3	DF	Baldo di Gregorio	22 January 1984 (aged 17)			(German Football Association) Eintracht Frankfurt II
4	DF	Sven Schaffrath	13 July 1984 (aged 16)			(German Football Association) Bayer Leverkusen II
5	MF	Daniyel Cimen	19 January 1985 (aged 16)			(German Football Association) Eintracht Frankfurt II
6	MF	Dustin Meier	30 January 1984 (aged 17)			(German Football Association) Werder Bremen II
7	MF	Patrick Ochs	14 May 1984 (aged 16)			(German Football Association) Eintracht Frankfurt II
8	MF	Arian Berkigt	10 April 1984 (aged 17)			(German Football Association) Borussia Mönchengladbach II
9	FW	Erdal Kılıçaslan	23 August 1984 (aged 16)			(German Football Association) Bayern Munich II
10	MF	Piotr Trochowski	22 March 1984 (aged 17)			(German Football Association) Bayern Munich II
11	FW	David Odonkor	21 February 1984 (aged 17)			(German Football Association) Borussia Dortmund II
12	GK	Marcus Rickert	18 February 1984 (aged 17)			(German Football Association) Hansa Rostock II
13	DF	Oliver Madjeski	3 January 1984 (aged 17)			(German Football Association) Werder Bremen II
14	MF	Alexander Laas	5 May 1984 (aged 16)			(German Football Association) Hamburg II
15	MF	Andreas Spann	17 May 1984 (aged 16)			(German Football Association) Borussia Mönchengladbach II
16	MF	Charles Takyi (Note: Capped for Ghana)	12 November 1984 (aged 16)			(German Football Association) Schalke 04 II
17	DF	Christian Demirtas	25 May 1984 (aged 16)			(German Football Association) Eintracht Frankfurt II
18	MF	Alexander Ludwig	31 January 1984 (aged 17)			(German Football Association) Werder Bremen II

=== Romania ===
Head coach: Vasile Aelenei

No.	Pos.	Player	Date of birth (age)	Caps	Goals	Club
1	GK	Dan Chilom	1 January 1985 (aged 16)			(Romanian Football Federation) Dinamo București
2	DF	Adrian Ciurea	2 April 1984 (aged 17)			(Romanian Football Federation) CSS Pitești
3	DF	Sorin Rădoi	30 June 1985 (aged 15)			(Romanian Football Federation) Extensiv Craiova
4	DF	Ion Harmath	3 August 1984 (aged 16)			(Romanian Football Federation) Extensiv Craiova
5	DF	Valentin Draghici	25 January 1984 (aged 17)			(Romanian Football Federation) SC Astra Ploiești
6	MF	Octavian Abrudan	16 March 1984 (aged 17)			(Romanian Football Federation) Universitatea Cluj
7	MF	Valentin Ioviță	23 January 1984 (aged 17)			(Romanian Football Federation) Sportul Studențesc
8	MF	Catalin Rata	19 February 1984 (aged 17)			(Romanian Football Federation) FC Sporting Pitești
9	FW	Rareş Tudor Oprea	1 November 1984 (aged 16)			(Romanian Football Federation) Apulum Alba Iulia
10	MF	Alin Ilin	18 July 1984 (aged 16)			(Romanian Football Federation) Dinamo București
11	FW	Andrei Cristea	25 May 1984 (aged 16)			(Romanian Football Federation) Bacău
12	GK	Felix Manea	26 October 1984 (aged 16)			(Romanian Football Federation) CSS Bacău
13	DF	Stefan Stere	13 January 1984 (aged 17)			(Romanian Football Federation) Sportul Studențesc
14	DF	Gabriel Velcovici	2 October 1984 (aged 16)			(Romanian Football Federation) Extensiv Craiova
15	DF	George Matei	26 May 1984 (aged 16)			(Romanian Football Federation) Steaua Bukarest
16	MF	Florian Petrica	11 February 1984 (aged 17)			(Romanian Football Federation) Universitatea Craiova
17	MF	Vasile Prodan	26 August 1984 (aged 16)			(Romanian Football Federation) Universitatea Cluj
18	FW	Constantin Coman	15 May 1984 (aged 16)			(Romanian Football Federation) FC Sporting Pitești

=== Spain ===
Head coach: Juan Santisteban

No.	Pos.	Player	Date of birth (age)	Caps	Goals	Club
1	GK	Jorge Zaparaín	26 April 1984 (aged 17)	2	0	(Royal Spanish Football Federation) Zaragoza B
2	DF	Jesús	21 April 1984 (aged 17)	5	0	(Royal Spanish Football Federation) Real Madrid Castilla
3	DF	Javier Tarantino	26 June 1984 (aged 16)	4	0	(Royal Spanish Football Federation) Athletic Bilbao B
4	DF	Carlos García	29 April 1984 (aged 17)	7	0	(Royal Spanish Football Federation) Espanyol B
5	DF	Miguel Flaño	19 August 1984 (aged 16)	2	0	(Royal Spanish Football Federation) Osasuna B
6	MF	Alberto Ortiz	18 February 1984 (aged 17)	7	1	(Royal Spanish Football Federation) Racing Santander B
7	FW	Guillem Bauzà	25 October 1984 (aged 16)	4	0	(Royal Spanish Football Federation) Mallorca B
8	MF	Andrés Iniesta	11 May 1984 (aged 16)	4	1	(Royal Spanish Football Federation) Barcelona B
9	FW	Senel	13 May 1984 (aged 16)	0	0	(Royal Spanish Football Federation) Celta Vigo B
10	MF	Diego León	16 January 1984 (aged 17)	10	6	(Royal Spanish Football Federation) Real Madrid Castilla
11	MF	Sergio Torres	2 March 1984 (aged 17)	3	0	(Royal Spanish Football Federation) Atlético Madrid B
12	DF	Miguel Palencia	2 January 1984 (aged 17)	4	0	(Royal Spanish Football Federation) Real Madrid Castilla
13	GK	Miguel Ángel Moyà	2 April 1984 (aged 17)	2	0	(Royal Spanish Football Federation) Mallorca B
14	FW	Fernando Torres	20 March 1984 (aged 17)	3	4	(Royal Spanish Football Federation) Atlético Madrid B
15	MF	Jaime Gavilán	12 May 1985 (aged 15)	4	0	(Royal Spanish Football Federation) Valencia Mestalla
16	MF	Gorka Larrea	7 April 1984 (aged 17)	3	0	(Royal Spanish Football Federation) Real Sociedad B
17	FW	Pepe	6 January 1984 (aged 17)	7	0	(Royal Spanish Football Federation) Deportivo La Coruña B
18	DF	Melli	6 June 1984 (aged 16)	1	0	(Royal Spanish Football Federation) Betis B

== Group B ==
=== Netherlands ===
Head coach: Ruud Kaiser

No.	Pos.	Player	Date of birth (age)	Caps	Goals	Club
1	GK	Boy Waterman	24 January 1984 (aged 17)			(Royal Dutch Football Association) Ajax
2	DF	Reinhard Breinburg (Note: Capped for Aruba)	2 May 1984 (aged 16)			(Royal Dutch Football Association) Feyenoord
3	MF	Nigel de Jong	30 November 1984 (aged 16)			(Royal Dutch Football Association) Jong Ajax
4	DF	Ferne Snoyl	8 March 1985 (aged 16)			(Royal Dutch Football Association) Feyenoord
5	DF	Michael Jansen	10 June 1984 (aged 16)			(Royal Dutch Football Association) Vitesse Arnhem
6	DF	Matthijs Maruanaya	6 January 1984 (aged 17)			(Royal Dutch Football Association) AZ
7	MF	Marvin Wijks	11 May 1984 (aged 16)			(Royal Dutch Football Association) Sparta Rotterdam
8	MF	John Schot	7 February 1984 (aged 17)			(Royal Dutch Football Association) PSV
9	FW	Sherjill MacDonald	20 November 1984 (aged 16)			(Royal Dutch Football Association) Jong Ajax
10	MF	Wesley Sneijder (captain)	9 June 1984 (aged 16)			(Royal Dutch Football Association) Jong Ajax
11	MF	Lorenzo Rimkus	22 September 1984 (aged 16)			(Royal Dutch Football Association) Sparta Rotterdam
12	DF	Arnold Kruiswijk	2 November 1984 (aged 16)			(Royal Dutch Football Association) FC Groningen
13	DF	Sigourney Bandjar	18 August 1984 (aged 16)			(Royal Dutch Football Association) Feyenoord
14	MF	Sergio Hellings	11 October 1984 (aged 16)			(Royal Dutch Football Association) Ajax
15	DF	Ronnie Stam	18 June 1984 (aged 16)			(Royal Dutch Football Association) NAC
16	GK	Illary van der Lee	22 April 1984 (aged 17)			(Royal Dutch Football Association) RBC Roosendaal
17	MF	Ralf de Haan	3 January 1984 (aged 17)			(Royal Dutch Football Association) NEC
18	MF	Eldridge Rojer	13 March 1984 (aged 17)			(Royal Dutch Football Association) Vitesse Arnhem

=== Poland ===
Head coach: Krzysztof Słabik

No.	Pos.	Player	Date of birth (age)	Caps	Goals	Club
1	GK	Jakub Siwierski	9 April 1984 (aged 17)			(Polish Football Association) SMS Łódź
2	DF	Błażej Telichowski	6 June 1984 (aged 16)			(Polish Football Association) Lech Poznan
3	DF	Łukasz Golisz	19 January 1984 (aged 17)			(Polish Football Association) MSP Szamotuły
4	DF	Grzegorz Wojtkowiak	26 January 1984 (aged 17)			(Polish Football Association) Celuloza Kostrzyn
5	DF	Maciej Papież	17 March 1984 (aged 17)			(Polish Football Association) Hutnik Kraków
6	MF	Michał Ćmich	17 February 1984 (aged 17)			(Polish Football Association) MOSiR Jastrzębie
7	MF	Damian Zdolski	9 July 1984 (aged 16)			(Polish Football Association) Ceramed Bielsko-Biała
8	FW	Marek Wasicki	17 January 1984 (aged 17)			(Polish Football Association) Lechia Gdańsk
9	FW	Dariusz Stachowiak	18 July 1984 (aged 16)			(Polish Football Association) Lech Poznan
10	MF	Jakub Wiszniewski	21 April 1984 (aged 17)			(Polish Football Association) Lechia Gdańsk
11	FW	Mariusz Zganiacz	31 January 1984 (aged 17)			(Polish Football Association) Czarni Gorzyce
12	GK	Rafał Misztal	10 April 1984 (aged 17)			(Polish Football Association) Hutnik Kraków
13	MF	Łukasz Szczoczarz	19 January 1984 (aged 17)			(Polish Football Association) Stal Rzeszów
14	MF	Jakub Małecki	25 January 1984 (aged 17)			(Polish Football Association) Śląsk Wrocław
15	DF	Maciej Bielski	17 January 1984 (aged 17)			(Polish Football Association) Śląsk Wrocław
16	FW	Sebastian Szałachowski	21 January 1984 (aged 17)			(Polish Football Association) Górnik Łęczna
17	FW	Kamil Loch	23 January 1984 (aged 17)			(Polish Football Association) Ruch Chorzów
18	DF	Paweł Waleszczyk	28 April 1984 (aged 16)			(Polish Football Association) MSP Szamotuły

=== Russia ===
Head coach: Yuri Smirnov

No.	Pos.	Player	Date of birth (age)	Caps	Goals	Club
1	GK	Sergey Ivanov	16 June 1984 (aged 16)			(Russian Football Union) Zenit Saint Petersburg
2	DF	Nikolay Abramov	5 January 1984 (aged 17)			(Russian Football Union) Spartak Moscow
3	DF	Andrei Lozhkin	11 July 1984 (aged 16)			(Russian Football Union) Gazovik-Gazprom Izhevsk
4	DF	Aleksandr Kondrashov	30 May 1984 (aged 16)			(Russian Football Union) Krylia Sovetov Samara
5	DF	Aleksei Danilenko	5 January 1984 (aged 17)			(Russian Football Union) Spartak Moscow
6	DF	Mikhail Sukhov	4 June 1984 (aged 16)			(Russian Football Union) Krylia Sovetov Samara
7	FW	Ruslan Dzutsev	31 March 1984 (aged 17)			(Russian Football Union) Alania Vladikavkaz
8	DF	Sergei Pugachyov	22 December 1984 (aged 16)			(Russian Football Union) FC Sportakademklub Moscow
9	MF	Anton Grebnev	16 May 1984 (aged 16)			(Russian Football Union) Sokol Saratov
10	MF	Denis Zabrodin	25 January 1984 (aged 17)			(Russian Football Union) Sokol Saratov
11	FW	Anatoli Gerk	20 November 1984 (aged 16)			(Russian Football Union) FC Sportakademklub Moscow
12	GK	Aleksei Podolev	25 January 1984 (aged 17)			(Russian Football Union) Oryol
13	MF	Andrei Streltsov	18 March 1984 (aged 17)			(Russian Football Union) FC Sportakademklub Moscow
14	DF	Sergei Kryuchikhin	15 January 1984 (aged 17)			(Russian Football Union) Krasnodar-2000
15	MF	Viktor Budyanskiy	12 January 1984 (aged 17)			(Russian Football Union) FC Sportakademklub Moscow
16	DF	Sergei Pishchulyov	1 September 1984 (aged 16)			(Russian Football Union) Spartak-Orekhovo Orekhovo-Zuyevo
17	FW	Aleksandr Danishevsky	23 February 1984 (aged 17)			(Russian Football Union) FC Sportakademklub Moscow
18	FW	Timur Khamitov	4 April 1984 (aged 17)			(Russian Football Union) Spartak-Orekhovo Orekhovo-Zuyevo

=== Turkey ===
Head coach: Gündüz Tekin Onay

No.	Pos.	Player	Date of birth (age)	Caps	Goals	Club
1	GK	Şener Özcan	3 March 1985 (aged 16)			(Turkish Football Federation) Gençlerbirliği
2	DF	Burak Gürsoy	22 February 1984 (aged 17)			(Turkish Football Federation) Galatasaray
3	DF	Sezgin Yılmaz	9 July 1984 (aged 16)			(Turkish Football Federation) Trabzonspor
4	DF	Koray Çölgeçen	28 May 1985 (aged 15)			(Turkish Football Federation) Göztepe
5	MF	Volkan Pullu	3 January 1984 (aged 17)			(Turkish Football Federation) Trabzonspor
6	MF	Tolgan Altun	25 February 1984 (aged 17)			(Turkish Football Federation) Fenerbahçe
7	MF	Sabri Sarıoğlu	26 July 1984 (aged 16)			(Turkish Football Federation) Galatasaray
8	MF	Fırat Türker	5 July 1984 (aged 16)			(Turkish Football Federation) Fenerbahçe
9	FW	Mesut Balcı	15 February 1986 (aged 15)			(Turkish Football Federation) Gaziantepspor
10	MF	Doğa Kaya	30 June 1984 (aged 16)			(Turkish Football Federation) Gençlerbirliği
11	FW	Osman Bayraktar	1 June 1984 (aged 16)			(Turkish Football Federation) Trabzonspor
12	GK	Mert Hoşgör	4 July 1984 (aged 16)			(Turkish Football Federation) Dardanel Spor
13	DF	Osman Alptekin	4 February 1984 (aged 17)			(Turkish Football Federation) Bursaspor
14	DF	Özer Karaduman	8 January 1984 (aged 17)			(Turkish Football Federation) Ankaragücü
15	MF	Dündar Denizhan	10 January 1984 (aged 17)			(Turkish Football Federation) Fenerbahçe
16	DF	Emre Güngör	1 August 1984 (aged 16)			(Turkish Football Federation) Bakırköyspor
17	MF	Deniz Baykara	13 May 1984 (aged 16)			(Turkish Football Federation) Gaziosmanpaşaspor
18	DF	Feridun Sungur	2 January 1984 (aged 17)			(Turkish Football Federation) Trabzonspor

== Group C ==
=== England ===
Head coach: Dick Bate

No.	Pos.	Player	Date of birth (age)	Caps	Goals	Club
1	GK	Lee Camp (Note: Capped for Northern Ireland)	22 August 1984 (aged 16)			(The Football Association) Derby County
2	DF	Justin Hoyte (Note: Capped for Trinidad and Tobago)	20 November 1984 (aged 16)			(The Football Association) Arsenal
3	MF	Kris Taylor	12 January 1984 (aged 17)			(The Football Association) Manchester United
4	MF	Steven Schumacher (captain)	30 April 1984 (aged 17)			(The Football Association) Everton
5	DF	Glen Johnson	23 August 1984 (aged 16)			(The Football Association) West Ham United
6	MF	Ben Bowditch	19 February 1984 (aged 17)			(The Football Association) Tottenham Hotspur
7	FW	Craig Westcarr	29 January 1985 (aged 16)			(The Football Association) Newcastle United
8	MF	John Welsh	10 January 1984 (aged 17)			(The Football Association) Liverpool
9	FW	Cherno Samba (Note: Capped for Gambia)	10 November 1985 (aged 15)			(The Football Association) Millwall
10	MF	Ciaran Donnelly	2 April 1984 (aged 17)			(The Football Association) Blackburn Rovers
11	FW	Shaun Docherty	6 December 1984 (aged 17)			(The Football Association) Newcastle United
12	DF	Neil Arndale	26 April 1984 (aged 17)			(The Football Association) Bristol Rovers
13	GK	Lenny Pidgeley	7 February 1984 (aged 17)			(The Football Association) Chelsea
14	MF	Jerome Watt	20 October 1984 (aged 16)			(The Football Association) Blackburn Rovers
16	DF	David Murphy	1 March 1984 (aged 17)			(The Football Association) Middlesbrough
17	MF	Steven Beck	4 June 1984 (aged 16)			(The Football Association) Everton
18	MF	Eddie Johnson	20 September 1984 (aged 16)			(The Football Association) Manchester United

=== Hungary ===
Head coach: Mihály Ubrankovics

No.	Pos.	Player	Date of birth (age)	Caps	Goals	Club
	GK	Zoltán Kovács	29 October 1984 (aged 16)			(Hungarian Football Federation) MTK Budapest II
	DF	Attila Lakatos	17 May 1984 (aged 16)			(Hungarian Football Federation) Győr
	MF	József Kanta	24 March 1984 (aged 17)			(Hungarian Football Federation) MTK Budapest II
	MF	Zsolt Müller	8 April 1984 (aged 17)			(Hungarian Football Federation) Debrecen II
	FW	Mihály Horváth	21 May 1984 (aged 16)			(Hungarian Football Federation) Újpest II
	FW	Attila Laskai	14 February 1984 (aged 17)			(Hungarian Football Federation) Nyírség NSC

=== Italy ===
Head coach: Paolo Berrettini

Caps as of before the start of the tournament

No.	Pos.	Player	Date of birth (age)	Caps	Goals	Club
1	GK	Andrea Ivaldi	24 February 1984 (aged 17)	10	0	(Italian Football Federation) Genoa
2	DF	Damiano Ferronetti	1 November 1984 (aged 16)	10	0	(Italian Football Federation) Roma
3	DF	Andrea Mantovani	22 June 1984 (aged 16)	10	0	(Italian Football Federation) Torino
4	DF	Alberto Aquilani	7 July 1984 (aged 16)			(Italian Football Federation) Roma
5	DF	Mauro Belotti (captain)	13 May 1984 (aged 16)			(Italian Football Federation) Atalanta
6	MF	Gabriele Perico	11 March 1984 (aged 17)			(Italian Football Federation) Atalanta
7	FW	Paolo Facchinetti	6 March 1984 (aged 17)			(Italian Football Federation) Atalanta
8	MF	Alex Pederzoli	6 March 1984 (aged 17)			(Italian Football Federation) Juventus
9	FW	Giampaolo Pazzini	2 August 1984 (aged 16)			(Italian Football Federation) Atalanta
10	MF	Francesco Lodi	23 March 1984 (aged 17)			(Italian Football Federation) Empoli
11	DF	Giorgio Chiellini	14 August 1984 (aged 16)			(Italian Football Federation) Livorno
12	GK	Alessandro Parravicini	17 May 1984 (aged 16)	0	0	(Italian Football Federation) Milan
13	DF	Giovanni Bartolucci	27 February 1984 (aged 17)	4	0	(Italian Football Federation) Fiorentina
14	MF	Mirko Stefani	25 January 1984 (aged 17)	2	1	(Italian Football Federation) Milan
15	MF	Alessandro Moro	2 October 1984 (aged 16)	10	1	(Italian Football Federation) Udinese
16	MF	Adriano D'Astolfo	23 March 1984 (aged 17)	2	0	(Italian Football Federation) Lodigiani
17	FW	Paolo De Crescenzo	21 January 1984 (aged 17)	6	0	(Italian Football Federation) Salernitana
18	FW	Luigi Della Rocca	2 September 1984 (aged 16)	4	5	(Italian Football Federation) Bologna

=== Switzerland ===
Head coach:

No.	Pos.	Player	Date of birth (age)	Caps	Goals	Club
	GK	Johnny Leoni	30 June 1984 (aged 17)			(Swiss Football Association) FC Sion
	DF	Cédric Gétaz	13 April 1984 (aged 17)			(Swiss Football Association) Lausanne-Sport
	DF	Phil Haid	18 September 1984 (aged 16)			(Swiss Football Association) FC St. Gallen
	DF	Stephan Lichtsteiner (captain)	16 January 1984 (aged 17)			(Swiss Football Association) Grasshopper
	DF	Giona Preisig	9 March 1984 (aged 17)			(Swiss Football Association) Lausanne-Sport
	DF	Diego Rinaldi	17 March 1984 (aged 17)			(Swiss Football Association) FC Sion
	DF	Philippe Senderos	24 February 1985 (aged 16)			(Swiss Football Association) Servette
	DF	Christian Schwegler	6 June 1984 (aged 17)			(Swiss Football Association) Grosswangen
	MF	Julien Fallet	19 June 1984 (aged 17)			(Swiss Football Association) FC Sion
	MF	Michael Hohl	26 June 1984 (aged 17)			(Swiss Football Association) FC Zürich
	MF	Stefan Kohler	18 May 1984 (aged 17)			(Swiss Football Association) Grasshopper
	MF	Yaël Piccand	9 November 1984 (aged 16)			(Swiss Football Association) Lausanne-Sport
	MF	Xavier Margairaz	7 January 1984 (aged 17)			(Swiss Football Association) Lausanne-Sport
	MF	Caryl Righetti	18 July 1984 (aged 17)			(Swiss Football Association) Neuchâtel Xamax
	FW	Joël Gasche	17 May 1984 (aged 17)			(Swiss Football Association) Grasshopper
	FW	Cédric Tsimba	5 August 1985 (aged 16)			(Swiss Football Association) Servette

== Group D ==
=== Croatia ===
Head coach: Martin Novoselac

No.	Pos.	Player	Date of birth (age)	Caps	Goals	Club
1	GK	Dario Krešić	11 January 1984 (aged 17)			(German Football Association) Stuttgart II
2	MF	Drago Papa	9 February 1984 (aged 17)			(Croatian Football Federation) PIK Vrbovec
3	MF	Hrvoje Čale	4 March 1985 (aged 16)			(Croatian Football Federation) Dinamo Zagreb
4	DF	Marko Bašić	13 September 1984 (aged 16)			(Croatian Football Federation) Dinamo Zagreb
5	DF	Silvio Cavrić	10 July 1985 (aged 15)			(Croatian Football Federation) Istra Pula
6	DF	Domagoj Skeja	15 April 1984 (aged 17)			(Croatian Football Federation) NK Zagreb
7	MF	Marko Janjetović	22 April 1984 (aged 17)			(Croatian Football Federation) Hrvatski Dragovoljac
8	DF	Dejan Prijić	2 January 1984 (aged 17)			(Croatian Football Federation) Osijek
9	FW	Igor Ružak	15 January 1984 (aged 17)			(Croatian Football Federation) Osijek
10	FW	Niko Kranjčar (captain)	13 August 1984 (aged 16)			(Croatian Football Federation) Dinamo Zagreb
11	FW	Ivan Grivičić	22 June 1984 (aged 16)			(Croatian Football Federation) Hajduk Split
12	GK	Adnan Hodžić	25 March 1985 (aged 16)			(Croatian Football Federation) Rijeka
13	MF	Kruno Jambrušić	7 February 1984 (aged 17)			(Croatian Football Federation) Slaven Belupo
14	MF	Mario Grgurović	2 February 1985 (aged 16)			(Croatian Football Federation) Hajduk Split
15	DF	Igor Lozo	2 March 1984 (aged 17)			(Croatian Football Federation) Hajduk Split
16	DF	Ivica Džidić	8 February 1984 (aged 17)			(Croatian Football Federation) Dinamo Zagreb
17	DF	Milan Krmpotić	22 August 1984 (aged 16)			(Croatian Football Federation) Hrvatski Dragovoljac
18	FW	Marko Marjanović	11 February 1985 (aged 16)			(Croatian Football Federation) Varteks

=== Finland ===
Head coach: Timo Liekoski

No.	Pos.	Player	Date of birth (age)	Caps	Goals	Club
	GK	Ville Iiskola	26 April 1985 (aged 16)			(Football Association of Finland) FC Kuusankoski
	GK	Antti Peltonen	22 April 1984 (aged 17)			(Football Association of Finland) Atlantis FC
	GK	Lauri Pirhonen	3 July 1984 (aged 17)			(Football Association of Finland) FC Jazz
	DF	Markus Halsti	19 March 1984 (aged 17)			(Football Association of Finland) Viikingit
	DF	Markus Hauhia	3 September 1984 (aged 17)			(Football Association of Finland) FC Reipas
	DF	Valtter Laaksonen	3 May 1984 (aged 17)			(Football Association of Finland) FC Inter
	DF	Niklas Moisander	29 September 1985 (aged 15)			(Football Association of Finland) TPS
	DF	Ari Nyman	7 February 1984 (aged 17)			(Football Association of Finland) FC Inter
	MF	Antti Hynynen	30 May 1984 (aged 17)			(Football Association of Finland) FC Haka
	MF	Toni Junnila	31 December 1984 (aged 16)			(Football Association of Finland) FC Jazz
	MF	Veli Lampi	18 July 1984 (aged 17)			(Football Association of Finland) Sepsi-78
	MF	Mika Mäkitalo	12 June 1985 (aged 16)			(Football Association of Finland) TPS
	MF	Juho Peltonen	5 February 1985 (aged 16)			(Football Association of Finland) TPS
	MF	Tommi Peltonen	27 February 1984 (aged 17)			(Football Association of Finland) Atlantis FC
	MF	Jarkko Riihimäki	27 February 1984 (aged 17)			(Football Association of Finland) PS-44
	MF	Janne Vellamo	28 September 1984 (aged 16)			(Football Association of Finland) TPS
	MF	Antonio Inutile	12 May 1985 (aged 16)			(Football Association of Finland) HJK
	FW	Jouni Orenius	6 March 1984 (aged 17)			(Football Association of Finland) TPS
	FW	Ville-Veikko Savolainen	25 January 1986 (aged 15)			(Football Association of Finland) FC Kuusysi
	FW	Felix Siivonen	3 April 1986 (aged 15)			(Football Association of Finland) HJK
	FW	Tony Österåker	1 February 1984 (aged 17)			(Football Association of Finland) BK-IFK

=== France ===
Head coach: Jean-François Jodar

No.	Pos.	Player	Date of birth (age)	Caps	Goals	Club
1	GK	Michaël Fabre	15 July 1984 (aged 17)			(Italian Football Federation) Bologna
2	DF	Kevin Débris	10 May 1984 (aged 17)			(French Football Federation) Le Havre
3	DF	Jérémy Berthod	24 April 1984 (aged 17)			(French Football Federation) Lyon
4	DF	Julio Colombo	22 February 1984 (aged 17)			(French Football Federation) Montpellier
5	DF	Jacques Faty (Note: Capped for Senegal) (captain)	25 February 1984 (aged 17)			(French Football Federation) Rennes
6	MF	Gaël Maia	2 January 1984 (aged 17)			(French Football Federation) Bordeaux
7	FW	Anthony Le Tallec	3 October 1984 (aged 16)			(French Football Federation) Le Havre
8	MF	Hassan Yebda (Note: Capped for Algeria)	14 May 1984 (aged 17)			(French Football Federation) Auxerre
9	FW	Sébastien Grax	23 June 1984 (aged 17)			(French Football Federation) AS Monaco
10	MF	Mourad Meghni	16 April 1984 (aged 17)			(Italian Football Federation) Bologna
11	FW	Florent Sinama Pongolle	20 October 1984 (aged 16)			(French Football Federation) Le Havre
12	MF	Emerse Faé (Note: Capped for Ivory Coast)	24 January 1984 (aged 17)			(French Football Federation) Nantes
13	DF	Stéphen Drouin	27 January 1984 (aged 17)			(French Football Federation) Nantes
14	DF	Jonathan De Nardi	17 July 1984 (aged 17)			(French Football Federation) AS Monaco
15	FW	Kévin Jacmot	22 March 1984 (aged 17)			(French Football Federation) Lyon
16	GK	Florent Chaigneau	21 March 1984 (aged 17)			(French Football Federation) Rennes
17	FW	Youssef Sofiane	21 August 1984 (aged 17)			(French Football Federation) Auxerre
18	MF	Samuel Piètre	10 February 1984 (aged 17)			(French Football Federation) Paris Saint-Germain

=== Scotland ===
Head coach: Ross Mathie

No.	Pos.	Player	Date of birth (age)	Caps	Goals	Club
	GK	Keiron Renton	13 December 1984 (aged 16)			(The Football Association) Blackburn Rovers
	GK	Iain Turner	26 January 1984 (aged 17)			(Scottish Football Association) Stirling Albion
	DF	Martin Brady	18 July 1984 (aged 17)			(Scottish Football Association) Celtic
	DF	Ryan Harding	27 April 1984 (aged 17)			(Scottish Football Association) Hibernian
	DF	Chris Hegarty	24 April 1984 (aged 17)			(Scottish Football Association) Scottish Schools
	DF	John Knox	17 February 1984 (aged 17)			(Scottish Football Association) Heart of Midlothian
	DF	Scott Morrison	23 May 1984 (aged 17)			(Scottish Football Association) Aberdeen
	DF	Mark Wilson	5 June 1984 (aged 17)			(Scottish Football Association) Dundee United
	MF	Niall Calder	3 September 1984 (aged 17)			(Scottish Football Association) Inverness
	MF	Darren Fletcher	1 February 1984 (aged 17)			(The Football Association) Manchester United
	MF	Joe Hamill	25 February 1984 (aged 17)			(Scottish Football Association) Heart of Midlothian
	MF	Paul Lawson	15 May 1984 (aged 17)			(Scottish Football Association) Celtic
	MF	Paul McLaughlan	12 March 1984 (aged 17)			(Scottish Football Association) Heart of Midlothian
	FW	Ross Kerr	1 October 1984 (aged 16)			(Scottish Football Association) Queen of the South
	FW	Peter Sweeney	25 September 1984 (aged 16)			(The Football Association) Millwall
	FW	Murray Watson	25 September 1984 (aged 16)			(Scottish Football Association) Aberdeen
	FW	Graham Weir	10 July 1984 (aged 17)			(Scottish Football Association) Heart of Midlothian
