= SPL Satakunnan piiri =

District organisation of the Football Association of Finland

Suomen Palloliiton Satakunnan piiri
- Abbreviation: SPL Satakunta
- Purpose: District Football Association
- Location(s): Itsenäisyydenkatu 44 28130 Pori Finland
- Director: Janne Koivisto
- Website: satakunta.palloliitto.fi

The SPL Satakunnan piiri (Satakunta Football Association) was one of the 12 district organisations of the Football Association of Finland. It administered lower tier football in Satakunta.

== Background ==
Suomen Palloliitto Satakunnan piiri, commonly referred to as SPL Satakunnan piiri or SPL Satakunta, is the governing body for football in Satakunta. SPL Satakunta was founded in 1934, as the SPL Häme-Satakunta-district was divided into two associations. Based in Pori, the Association's Director is Janne Koivisto.

== Member clubs ==
Abbreviation	Settlement	Official Name	Division	Cup	Other information
EuPa	Eura	Euran Pallo	Kolmonen	* *	Tier 2 (11 seasons): 1991–2000, 2004
EuPa2	Eura	Euran Pallo 2	Nelonen	* *	
FC Eurajoki	Eurajoki	FC Eurajoki	Vitonen	*	
FC HaPo	Harjavalta	Harjavallan Pallo	Vitonen	*	
FC Jazz	Pori	FC Jazz Juniorit	Kakkonen	* * *	Tier 1 (19 seasons): 1984–1988, 1991-2004; Tier 2 (11 seasons): 1948, 1966–1972, 1983, 1989-90; Tier 3 (7 seasons): 1973–1974, 1976, 1982, 2009-
FC Jazz 2	Pori	FC Jazz Juniorit / 2	Nelonen	* *	
FC Jazz 3	Pori	FC Jazz Juniorit/ 3	Vitonen	*	
FC Rauma	Rauma	FC Rauma	Nelonen	* *	Tier 3 (4 seasons): 2001-2004
FC Ulvila	Ulvila	FC Ulvila	Nelonen	*	
HNs	Huittinen	Huhtamon Nuorisoseura	Nelonen	*	
IKiri	Ihode, Pyhäranta	Ihoden Kiri	Vitonen	*	
KaPa	Kankaanpää	Kankaanpään Pallo	Vitonen	*	
Karhu-Futis	Pori	Karhu-Futis	-		Youth football
Koitto	Noormarkku, Pori	Noormarkun Koitto	Nelonen	*	
KoPa	Kokemäki	Kokemäen Pallo	Nelonen	*	
LLuja	Huittinen	Lauttakylän Luja	Vitonen	*	
LuVe	Luvia	Luvian Veto	Nelonen	* *	
LuVe2	Luvia	Luvian Veto /2	Vitonen	*	
MInto	Merikarvia	Merikarvian Into	Vitonen	*	
MuSa	Musa, Pori	Musan Salama	Kolmonen	* * *	Tier 2 (5 seasons): 1972, 1976, 1999-2001; Tier 3 (19 seasons): 1973–1975, 1977–1978, 1984, 1987–1989, 1995, 1997–1998, 2002–2005, 2007, 2010-2011
MuSa 2	Pori	Musan Salama / 2	Kolmonen	*	
MuSa 3	Pori	Musan Salama / 3	Vitonen	*	
MäKi	Mäntyluoto, Pori	Mäntyluodon Kiri	Vitonen	*	
Nasta	Nakkila	Nakkilan Nasta	Nelonen	* *	
Nasta2	Nakkila	Nakkilan Nasta / 2	Vitonen	*	
NiceFutis	Pori	NiceFutis	Naisten Liiga		Women's football Tier 1 (4 seasons): 2004-
P-Iirot	Rauma	Pallo-Iirot	Kakkonen	* * *	Tier 2 (24 seasons): 1938–1939, 1945, 1956–1957, 1962–1966, 1984–1985, 1991, 1993–2001, 2004-2005; Tier 3 (16 seasons): 1978–1980, 1983, 1986–1987, 1990, 1992, 2002–2003, 2006-
P-Iirot 2	Rauma	Pallo-Iirot / 2	Nelonen	* *	
PapaJazz	Pori	PapaJazz	-		Veteran football
PiTU	Pori	Pihlavan Työväen Urheilijat	Nelonen	*	Tier 2 (2 seasons): 1968-1969
PoPa	Pori	Porin Palloilijat	Kakkonen	* * *	Tier 2 (13 seasons): 1937–1939, 1945–1951, 2009–2011; Tier 3 (7 seasons): 1989, 2002–2003, 2005-2008
PoSa	Pormestarinluoto, Pori	Pormestarinluodon Salama	Nelonen	*	
ReKu	Reposaari, Pori	Reposaaren Kunto	Vitonen	*	
RuosV	Ruosniemi, Pori	Ruosniemen Visa		*	
TOVE	Toejoki, Pori	Toejoen Veikot	Kolmonen	* *	
TOVE2	Pori	Toejoen Veikot / 2	Vitonen	*	

== League Competitions ==
SPL Satakuntan piiri run the following league competitions:

=== Men's Football ===
- Division 3 - Kolmonen - one section
- Division 4 - Nelonen - one section
- Division 5 - Vitonen - one section

=== Ladies Football ===
- Division 3 - Kolmonen - one section

== SPL Satakunta champions ==
The SPL Satakunta clubs have played for the district's championship title since 1934 (ladies 1972).

=== Champions of the 2000s ===
Men/Ladies:

- 2000 FC Jazz/Pallo-Iirot
- 2001 FC Rauma/NiceFutis
- 2002 FC Jazz/Pallo-Iirot
- 2003 MuSa/Pallo-Iirot
- 2004 FC Jazz/Pallo-Iirot
- 2005 PoPa/Pallo-Iirot
- 2006 PoPa/NiceFutis
- 2007 FC PoPa/NiceFutis
- 2008 FC PoPa/KoPa
- 2009 FC PoPa/NiceFutis
- 2010 Pallo-Iirot/MuSa
- 2011 MuSa/NiceFutis

=== List of championship titles ===
- Men:

PPT / FC Jazz 18
FC PoPa 14
RU-38 12
Rauman Pallo 10
Pallo-Iirot 6
Ässät 3
MuSa 3
Kärpät 2
FC Rauma 1
Hakrit 1
PoPS 1
RTU Rauma 1
UTU Rauma 1

- Ladies:

MuSa 13
Pallo-Iirot 11
NiceFutis 8
Rauman Pallo 3
FC Rauma 1
KoPa 1
PPT 1
Ässät 1

== The Golden Shoe award ==
Satakunnan Kultakenkä - The Satakunta Golden Shoe is a yearly award for the best player of SPL Satakunta clubs. First award was presented in 1984 (ladies award in 2007).

- 1984 Petri Sulonen, PPT
- 1985 Jarmo Alatensiö, PPT
- 1986 Petri Sulonen, PPT
- 1987 Jarmo Alatensiö, PPT
- 1988 Risto Koskikangas, PPT
- 1989 Saku Laaksonen, PPT
- 1990 Pasi Sulonen, PPT
- 1991 Rami Nieminen, PPT
- 1992 Tommi Koivistoinen, FC Jazz
- 1993 Antti Sumiala, FC Jazz
- 1994 Vesa Rantanen, FC Jazz
- 1995 Rami Nieminen, FC Jazz
- 1996 Juha Riippa, FC Jazz
- 1997 Rami Hakanpää, FC Jazz
- 1998 Jyrki Rovio, FC Jazz
- 1999 Rami Hakanpää, FC Jazz
- 2000 Rami Nieminen, FC Jazz
- 2001 Juha Luoma, FC Jazz
- 2002 Marko Koivuranta, FC Jazz
- 2003 Teemu Vihtilä, FC Jazz
- 2004 Juha Luoma, FC Jazz
- 2005 Petteri Pitkänen, Pallo-Iirot
- 2006 Teemu Vihtilä, FC PoPa
- 2007 Juha Luoma, FC PoPa / Reetta Turtiainen, NiceFutis
- 2008 Lauri Pirhonen, FC PoPa / Anu Hoffren, NiceFutis
- 2009 William de Mattia, FC PoPa / Maiju Hirvonen, NiceFutis
- 2010 Samu-Petteri Mäkelä, FC PoPa / Anna Auvinen, NiceFutis
- 2011 Juho Patola, Pallo-Iirot / Siiri Välimaa, NiceFutis
- 2012 Kimmo Hörkkö, Pallo-Iirot / Siiri Välimaa, NiceFutis
- 2013 Toni Junnila, FC Jazz / Siiri Välimaa, NiceFutis
