= Sukhov =

Sukhov (Russian: Сухов, from сухой meaning dry) is a Russian masculine surname, its feminine counterpart is Sukhova. It may refer to:

- Aleksandr Sukhov (born 1986), Russian football player
- Fyodor Sukhov, protagonist of the 1970 Soviet movie White Sun of the Desert
- Georgy Sukhov / Georgi Suchow (1899–1942), Soviet herpetologist
- Mikhail Sukhov (born 1984), Russian football player
- Pavel Sukhov (born 1988), Russian fencer
- Sergei Mikhailovich Sukhov (born 1965), Soviet and Russian football player
