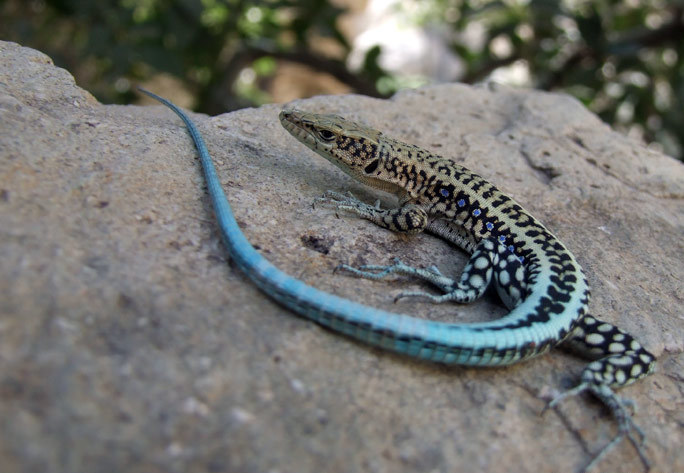

Conservation status
- Least Concern (IUCN 3.1)

Scientific classification
- Kingdom: Animalia
- Phylum: Chordata
- Class: Reptilia
- Order: Squamata
- Family: Lacertidae
- Genus: Apathya
- Species: A. cappadocica

Binomial name
- Apathya cappadocica (Werner, 1902)

Synonyms
- Lacerta cappadocica Werner, 1902; Lacerta cappadocica muhtari Eiselt, 1979; Lacerta cappadocica schmidtlerorum Eiselt, 1979

= Anatolian lizard =

Species of lizard

The Anatolian lizard (Apathya cappadocica) is a species of lizard endemic to Iran, Iraq, Syria and Turkey.

== Subspecies ==
- Apathya cappadocica cappadocica (Werner, 1902)
- Apathya cappadocica muhtari (Eiselt, 1979)
- Apathya cappadocica urmiana Lantz & Suchow, 1934
- Apathya cappadocica wolteri Bird, 1936
