= Takumi Minamino =

Japanese footballer (born 1995)

Takumi Minamino 南野 拓実
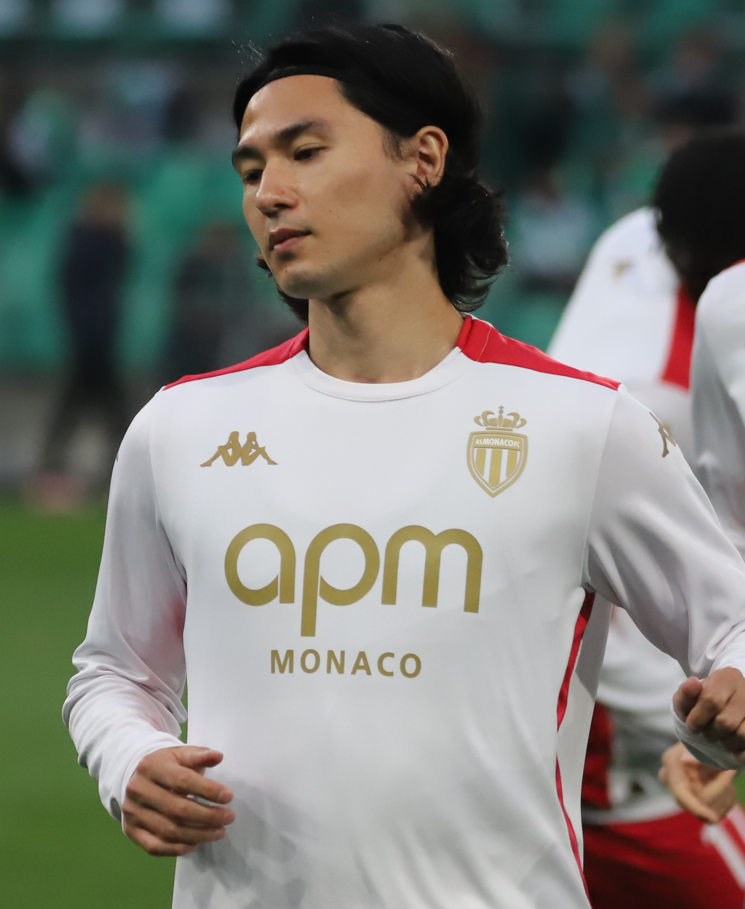
- Minamino with Monaco in 2025

Personal information
- Full name: Takumi Minamino
- Date of birth: 16 January 1995 (age 31)
- Place of birth: Izumisano, Ōsaka, Japan
- Height: 1.72 m (5 ft 8 in)
- Positions: Attacking midfielder; winger

Team information
- Current team: Monaco
- Number: 18

Youth career
- 2004–2006: Sessel Kumatori SC
- 2007–2012: Cerezo Osaka

Senior career*
Years	Team	Apps	(Gls)
2012–2015	Cerezo Osaka	62	(7)
2015–2020	Red Bull Salzburg	136	(42)
2020–2022	Liverpool	30	(4)
2021	→ Southampton (loan)	10	(2)
2022–	Monaco	98	(19)

International career^{‡}
2010–2011	Japan U17	15	(6)
2012	Japan U20	8	(5)
2015–2016	Japan Olympic	14	(4)
2015–	Japan	74	(26)
Medal record
Men's football
Representing Japan
AFC Asian Cup
Runner-up	2019 UAE
AFC U-23 Championship
Winner	2016 Qatar
- * Club domestic league appearances and goals as of 21 November 2026 ‡ National team caps and goals as of 14 November 2026

Takumi Minamino (南野 拓実, Minamino Takumi; born 16 January 1995) is a Japanese professional footballer who plays as an attacking midfielder or winger for Ligue 1 club Monaco and the Japan national team.

Minamino began his club career at J.League Division 1 club Cerezo Osaka in 2012, and in his first season he was named the J.League Best Young Player. In 2014, he moved to Austrian club Red Bull Salzburg with whom he spent four seasons. Following impressive displays for the club, he joined Liverpool on 1 January 2020, winning the 2019–20 Premier League in his first season.

Making his senior international debut for Japan in 2015, Minamino featured in the team that reached the final of the 2019 AFC Asian Cup, also playing at the 2022 FIFA World Cup, and 2023 AFC Asian Cup.

== Early life ==
Minamino was born in Izumisano, Osaka Prefecture. While at elementary school, he played for the local club Sessel Kumatori. Growing up, he was inspired by the finishing and dribbling of Brazilian striker Ronaldo, who was the top scorer at the 2002 FIFA World Cup which Japan co-hosted. He would watch videos of Ronaldo's feints, and go outside to practice. He was also inspired by his older brother Kenta. Their father would put cones down in a car park for them to dribble in and out of at speed. He attended Osaka-Kokoku High School, where he became classmates with Kyōgo Furuhashi. Minamino has described himself as an "active child" growing up.

== Club career ==
=== Cerezo Osaka ===
Minamino joined Cerezo Osaka's youth team at age 12 and progressed through the academy. While at the Cerezo academy, players such as Shinji Kagawa were in the first team, and Minamino would watch them up close and train with them. Minamino said of the club's youth team in 2014: "At Cerezo Youth, the current physical coach of the top team was the coach during my time in the youth team, it was insanely tough, really."

In August 2009, Minamino participated in Japan's U15 Club Youth Soccer Championship Tournament and helped the Cerezo's U15 side finish eighth place, being eliminated in the quarter-finals. Nonetheless, he was the top scorer of the tournament, finishing with eight goals. The following year, Minamino helped Cerezo's U15 team finish at the top of the Prince League Kansai and at one point, he scored a hat-trick in a 5–0 win over Kobe City Science and Technology High School on April 11, 2010.

In 2011, he began playing for Cerezo's U18s, as they participated in the Takamadomiya Cup JFA U-18 Soccer Premier League. Minamino placed in 4th place as one of the top scorers in the tournament, scoring nine times. Minamino also helped the side reach the final of the J Youth Cup, but they lost 3–1 against Nagoya Grampus U18; but nevertheless, he finished as the top scorer in the tournament, scoring thirteen times.

After spending two years progressing through Cerezo's youth system, Minamino was registered to the first team in August 2012. It was not until on November 17, 2012, that he made his Cerezo first-team debut, coming on as a substitute for Takuma Edamura, in a 3–1 loss against Omiya Ardija. Minamino made his first start for the side, playing the whole game, in a 2–2 draw against Kawasaki Frontale in the last game of the season. On December 15, 2012, he scored his first Cerezo goal, in a 4–0 win over Shimizu S-Pulse in the fourth round of the Emperor's Cup. At the end of the 2012 season, Minamino went on to make five appearances and scoring once in all competitions.

He broke into the first team in 2013 and was given the number thirteen shirt ahead of the new season. Minamino became the first player from the club's youth system to play in the opening game of the season against Albirex Niigata, which Cerezo won 1–0. Shortly after, his contract status changed to professional A, having met the requirement to play enough matches this season. Minamino continued to perform well throughout March when he set up two assists in the next two league matches before scoring his first goal of the season, in a 2–1 win over Oita Trinita in the Emperor's Cup. Minamino later scored two more goals in the Emperor's Cup before being eliminated by Urawa Red Diamonds in the quarter-finals, in which he scored in the second leg. Six days after the club's elimination in the Emperor's Cup, he scored his first J.League Division 1 goal against Júbilo Iwata on July 7, 2013, becoming the youngest goal scorer for the club, as Cerez drew 2–2. Three weeks later, Minamino scored in a friendly match against Manchester United when "he sent a 20-yard piledriver into the top of the net, giving the opposition goalkeeper Anders Lindegaard no chance at all". Following the match, his performance was praised by Manchester United players and manager David Moyes. However, during a match against Shimizu S-Pulse on August 19, 2013, he suffered a medial collateral ligament (MCL) injury on his left knee and was sidelined for six weeks. It was not until September 28, 2013, when Minamino made his first team return, coming on as a substitute, in a 2–0 win against Júbilo Iwata. He scored in a following match, in a 2–0 win over Oita Trinita. Minamino later scored three more goals in the 2013 season, including a brace against Urawa Red Diamonds in the last game of the season. At the end of the season, he went on to make 38 appearances and score 8 goals in all competitions. Following this, Minamino went on to win the 2013 J.League Best Young Player award; previous winners include Takashi Usami (2010), Hiroki Sakai (2011) and Gaku Shibasaki (2012). He also signed a contract extension with the club.

At the start of the 2014 season, Minamino made his AFC Champions League debut in a 1–1 draw against Pohang Steelers. Three weeks later on March 18, 2014, he scored his first goals of the AFC Champions League, in a 4–0 win over Buriram United. However, in a 2–0 loss against Pohang Steelers on April 16, 2014, he received a straight red card in the 41st minute for a professional foul. It was not until on July 12, 2014, when Minamino scored his first goal in four months, in a 4–2 win over Veertien Mie in the second round of the Emperor's Cup. However, during a match against Kawasaki Frontale on July 15, 2014, he was then sent off for a professional foul once again, as they lost 3–1. After the match, Minamino apologised on his Twitter account for his action that got him sent off. During a 0–0 draw against Ventforet Kofu, Minamino's performance was the subject of criticism when he struggled to defend despite playing in the left-wing position; prompting apology on his Twitter account once again. A month later, he scored his first league goal of the season, in a 5–4 loss against Kawasaki Frontale. After serving a match suspension, Minamino scored his second league goal of the season, in a 2–1 loss against Vissel Kobe. He then went on a goalscoring spree; scoring against Kawasaki Frontale in both legs of the J.League Cup, and against Júbilo Iwata in the Emperor's Cup. However, his second and last season was more of a struggle, with the club eventually getting relegated. By the end of the 2014 season, he had made 42 appearances and scored 8 times in all competitions. In total, he made 62 J.League Division 1 appearances for Cerezo Osaka, scoring 7 league goals. Following this, Minamino was linked with a move away from the club, as several European clubs were interested in signing him.

=== Red Bull Salzburg ===
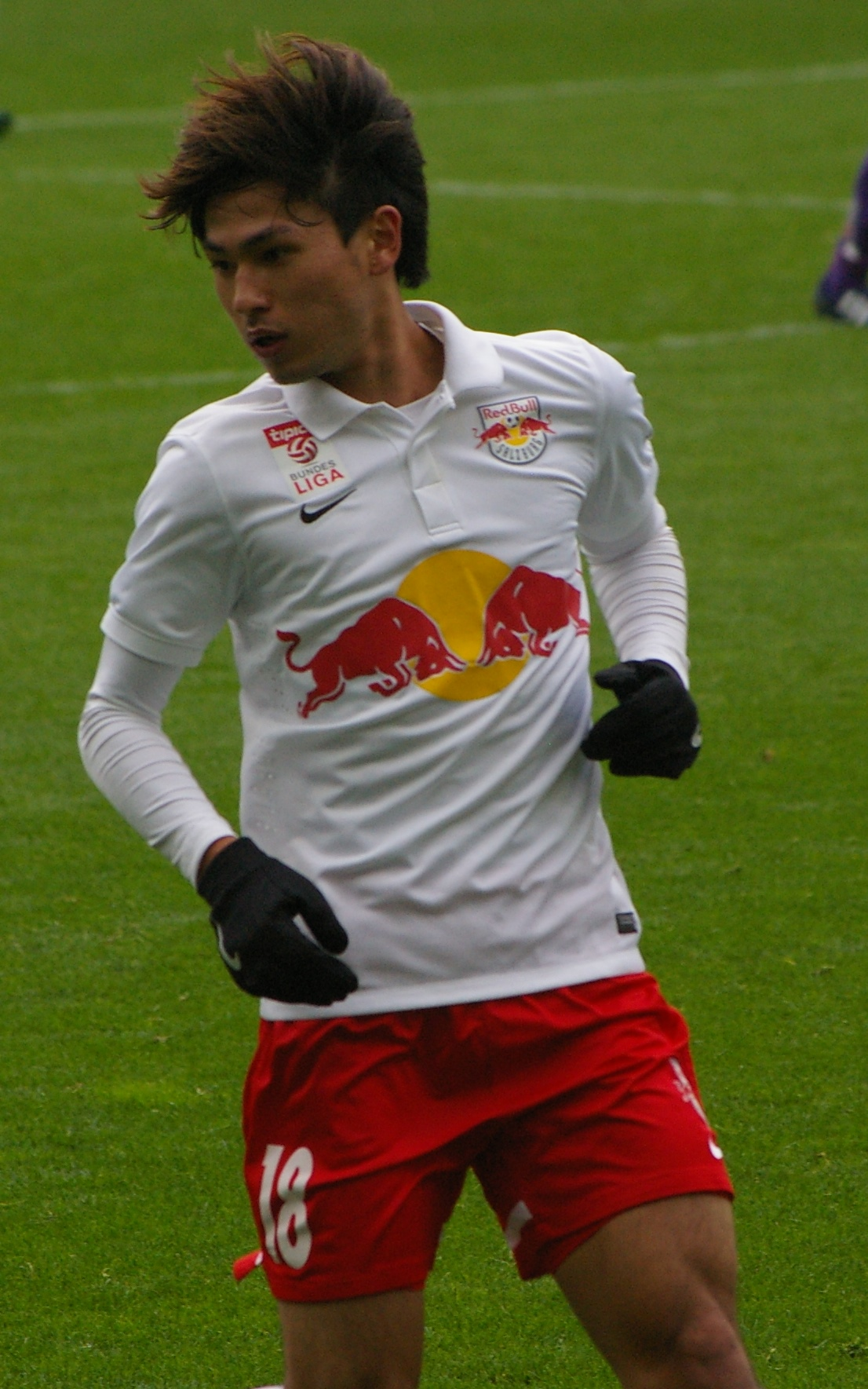
Minamino playing for Red Bull Salzburg in 2015

Red Bull Salzburg had tracked him for a year and a half before signing him on 7 January 2015, on a contract running until 2018 with the option of a further year. Cerezo Osaka later confirmed the transfer move shortly after.

Minamino made his Red Bull Salzburg debut on February 13, 2015, when he started a match against Wiener Neustadt in a left-wing position before being substituted in the 64th minute. After missing two matches due to a tear on his adductor muscle, he returned from injury to make his European debut on February 26, 2015, playing the first half of a 1–3 home defeat (2–5 aggregate) to Villarreal in the second leg of the last 32 of the UEFA Europa League before being replaced by Felipe Pires. Minamino then scored his first goal for Salzburg and set up the club's fourth goal in a 4–1 win over Admira Wacker Mödling on March 2, 2015. He later scored his first goal of the season, in a 3–0 win over SV Grödig. Minamino later helped the side win the league for the first time in his Salzburg career. He featured in the final of the Austrian Cup, in a 2–0 win over Austria Wien. At the end of the 2014–15 season, Minamino went on to make 14 appearances and scored 3 times in all competitions. During the season, he quickly established himself in the starting eleven for the club, playing in the midfield position.

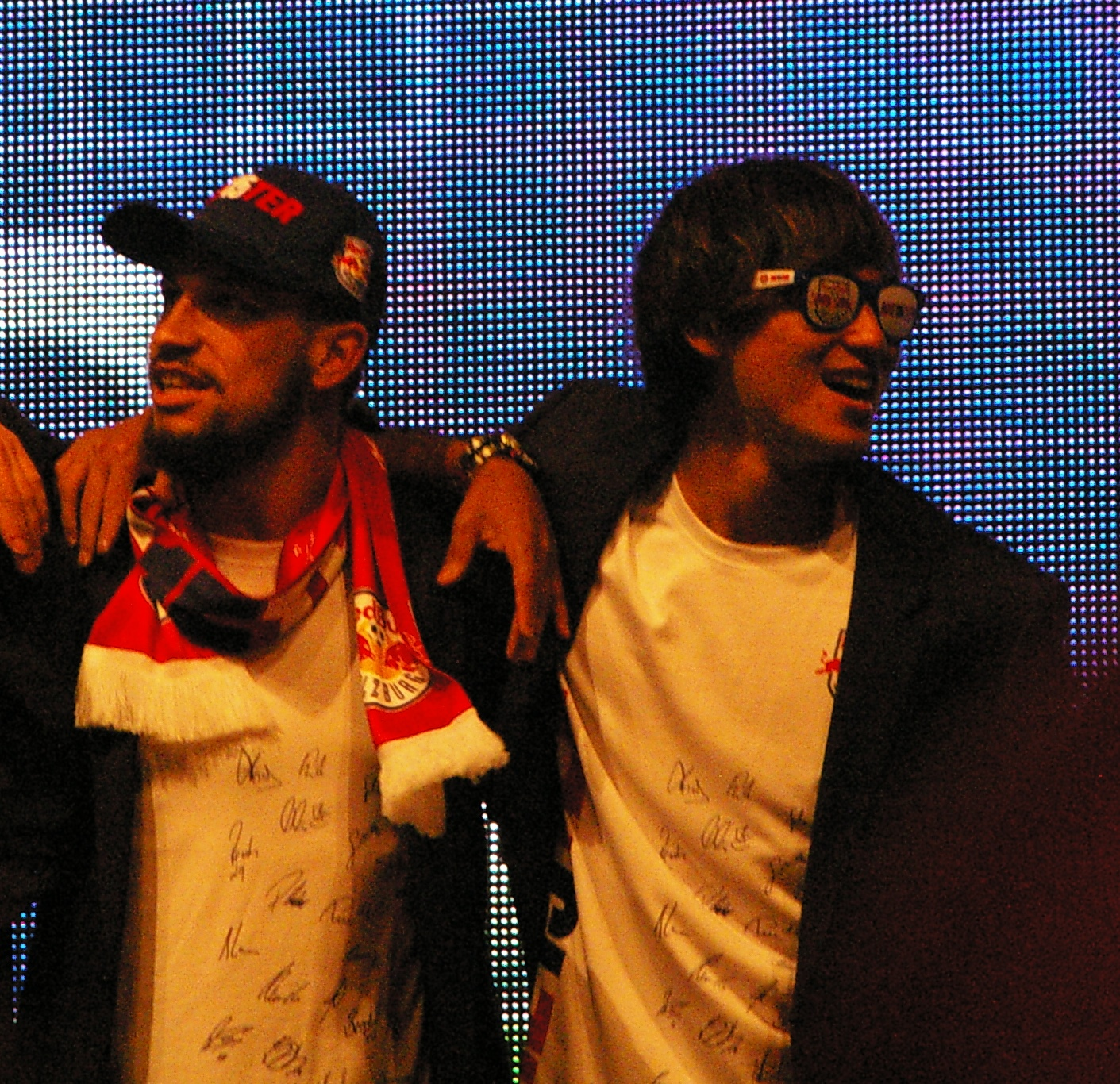
Minamino (right) celebrating winning the 2014–15 Austrian Football Bundesliga with Red Bull Salzburg

In the 2015–16 season, Minamino made a good start to the season when he scored his first goal of the season in a 7–0 win over Deutschlandsberger SC in the first round of the Austrian Cup. He then scored five goals throughout August, starting with a brace against SV Ried, and against Dinamo Minsk in the UEFA Europa League campaign as well as Sturm Graz. In a 4–2 win over SV Grödig on September 12, 2015, Minamino scored a brace before setting up the club's fourth goal of the game. He then scored two goals in two matches between October 4 and 17, against Rapid Wien and FC Admira Wacker Mödling. However, Minamino suffered a goal drought for the next four months which ended on February 28, 2016, when he scored in a 4–1 win over Austria Wien. He later scored two more goals in the 2015–16 season. Minamino then helped the side win the league for the second consecutive time in his Salzburg career. Twelve days after helping the side win the league, he came on as a substitute in the second half in the final of the Austrian Cup. At the end of the 2015–16 season, Minamino went on to make 40 appearances and scored 13 times in all competitions.

At the start of the 2016–17 season, Minamino scored his first goal of the season, in a 3–1 win over Vorwärts Steyr in the first round of the Austrian Cup. After being away from the club, due to international commitments, he scored on his return on August 20, 2016, in a 3–1 win over SV Mattersburg. Two weeks later, Minamino scored a brace, in a 4–0 win over Admira Wacker Mödling. He later scored three more goals, including another brace against Wolfsberger AC on December 17, 2016. Two months later, Minamino scored the first hat-trick of his Salzburg career, in a 6–1 win over SV Ried. He played an important role in scoring twice in a 5–0 win over Admira Wacker Mödling to reach the final of the Austrian Cup. Throughout the 2016–17 season, Minamino was featured in and out of the starting line-up, as he was mostly placed on the bench as a substitute. Despite this, he helped the side win both Austrian Cup and the league for the third consecutive time in his Salzburg career. At the end of the 2016–17 season, Minamino went on to make 31 appearances and scored 14 times in all competitions. During the season, he began to play in the striker position.

In the 2017–18 season, Minamino started the season well when he scored three goals in three different competitions against Hibernians, Deutschlandsberger SC and Wolfsberger AC. However, during a 5–1 win over St. Pölten on August 20, 2017 (where he set up the club's first goal of the game), Minamino suffered a ligament tear and was substituted in the 40th minute; as a result, he was sidelined for six weeks. It was not until October 14, 2017, when he made his return, coming on as a late substitute, in a 3–1 win over LASK. Minamino then scored his first goals in three months, in a 3–1 win over St. Pölten on November 5, 2017, and three weeks later, he scored again, in a 2–0 win over SV Mattersburg. At the beginning of February, Minamino signed a contract extension, keeping him tied to the club until 2021. He later scored three more league goals for the side, including a brace against Austria Wien on March 18, 2018. Minamino later helped Salzburg win the league for the fourth consecutive time in his Salzburg career. During the 2017–18 season, Salzburg had their best ever European campaign, as they finished top of their Europa League group, for a record fourth time, before beating Real Sociedad, Borussia Dortmund and Lazio (in which he scored two goals in the knockout stage against Real Sociedad and Lazio), thus making their first ever appearance in the UEFA Europa League semi-final. On May 3, 2018, he played in the Europa League semi-finals as Marseille played out a 1–2 away loss but won 3–2 on aggregate. By the end of the 2017–18 season, Minamino had made 44 appearances and scored 11 goals in all competitions.

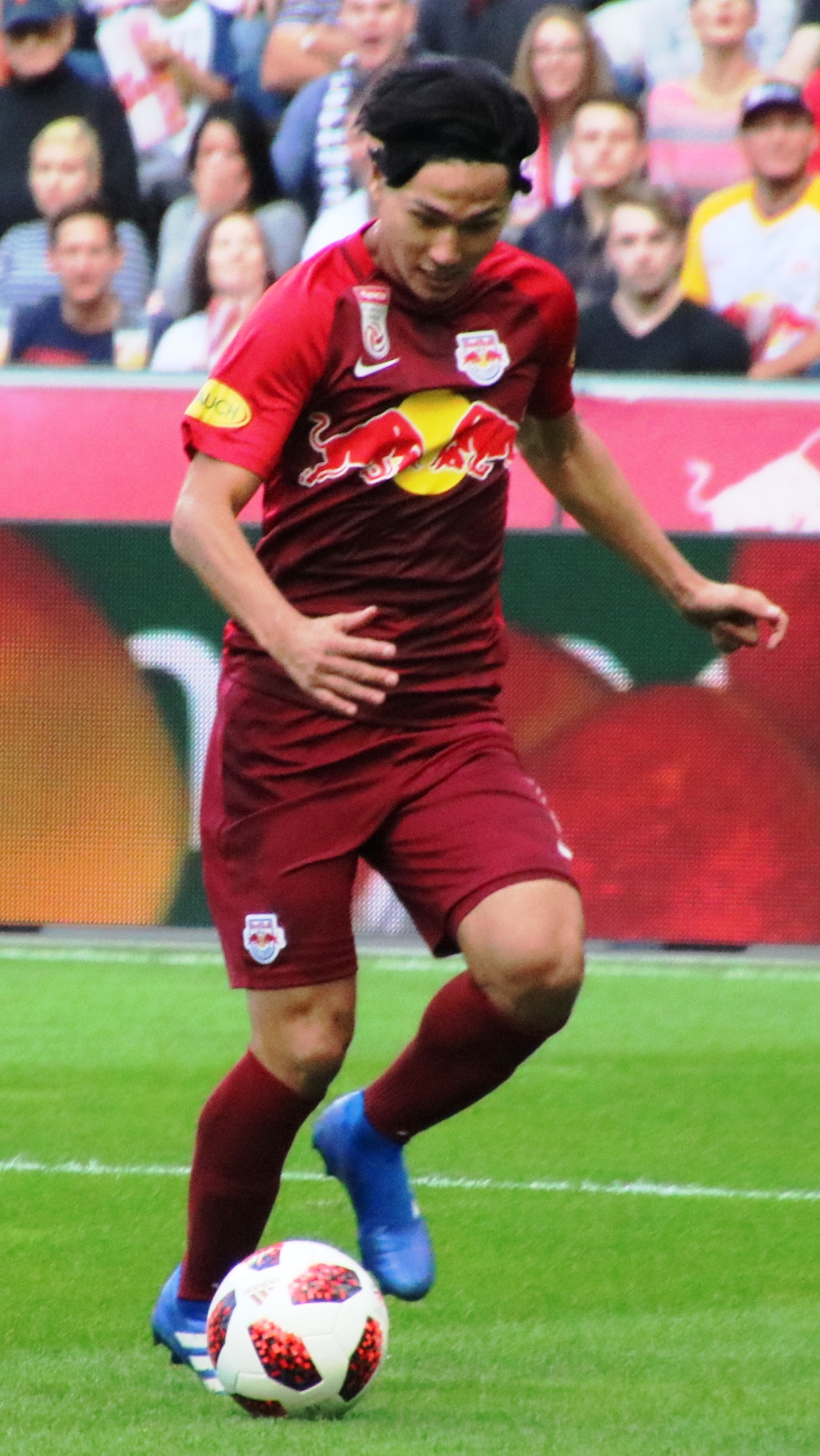
Minamino playing for Red Bull Salzburg in 2018

Having missed the start of the 2018–19 season, due to a hamstring injury, Minamino made his first appearance of the season, coming on as a late substitute, in a 3–1 win over LASK in the opening game of the season. It was not until on August 14, 2018, when he scored his first goal of the season in a 1–0 win over KF Shkëndija in the UEFA Champions League Qualification Round, to send the side through to the next round. Minamino then added three more goals by end of September. He then scored his first European goal of the season, in a 3–1 win over Celtic on October 4, 2018.

On November 8, 2018, Minamino had a first half hat-trick in a 5–2 victory over Rosenborg in the group stage of the 2018–19 UEFA Europa League. Following the match, he was named in the UEFA Europa League Team of the Week. This was followed up by scoring three days later, as well as setting up the first goal of the game, in a 2–0 win over Austria Wien. By the end of 2018, Minamino had scored eleven goals in all competitions for the side. Once again, he went three months without scoring and this ended when he scored and set up a goal for Mu'nas Dabbur who went on to score a hat-trick in a 5–1 win over Austria Wien on March 31, 2019. The following month, Minamino scored two more goals, including one against Grazer AK, which saw Salzburg reach the Austrian Cup final. He helped the side win the league for the fifth consecutive time in his Salzburg career. Despite being placed on the substitute bench for the Austrian Cup final, the club won 2–0 against Rapid Wien. By the end of the 2018–19 season, Minamino had made 45 appearances and scored 14 goals in all competitions. During the 2018–19 season, he continued to play in various positions in the attack.

At the start of the 2019–20 season, Minamino started the season well when he went on a scoring spree, resulting in him scoring four goals. In a UEFA Champions League match against Genk, he played a role when he set up two goals in a 6–2 win. Over the next two weeks, Minamino scored two more goals in Austrian Cup and UEFA Champions League matches against Rapid Wien and Liverpool respectively. He later scored two goals in two matches between November 23 and 27, 2019, against St. Pölten and Genk. Minamino scored his ninth goal of the season, in a 5–1 win over WSG Swarovski Tirol on 7 December 2019, in what turned out to be his last appearance for the club.

=== Liverpool ===
==== 2019–2021 ====
In December 2019, Liverpool agreed to a deal to sign Minamino from Salzburg in January 2020 after activating his £7.25 million release clause, making him the first Japanese player to play for the club. Salzburg's sporting director Christoph Freund commented that "The big clubs have been watching him and, if I was them, I'd have no hesitation to sign him. Takumi is ready to make the next step in January." On 18 December 2019, he had his Liverpool medical in preparation for his transfer on 1 January 2020.

On 5 January 2020, Minamino made his Liverpool debut in the club's 2019–20 FA Cup win over Everton, and made his Premier League debut against Wolverhampton Wanderers, coming on in the first half for Sadio Mané on 23 January. On 29 August, Minamino came on as a substitute, replacing Neco Williams, to score his first ever goal for Liverpool in the 73rd minute; he then scored the 4th penalty in the subsequent penalty shoot-out, in the 2020 FA Community Shield against Arsenal. On 19 December, Minamino scored his first league goal for Liverpool, the opener in a 7–0 away win over Crystal Palace.

On 1 February 2021, Minamino signed for Southampton on loan for the remainder of the 2020–21 season. Five days later, Minamino scored on his debut for the Saints in a 2–3 away league defeat by Newcastle United. He went on to feature ten times for the Saints until the end of the season, in the Premier League, scoring twice. He rejoined Liverpool for the 2021–22 season.

==== 2021–22 season ====
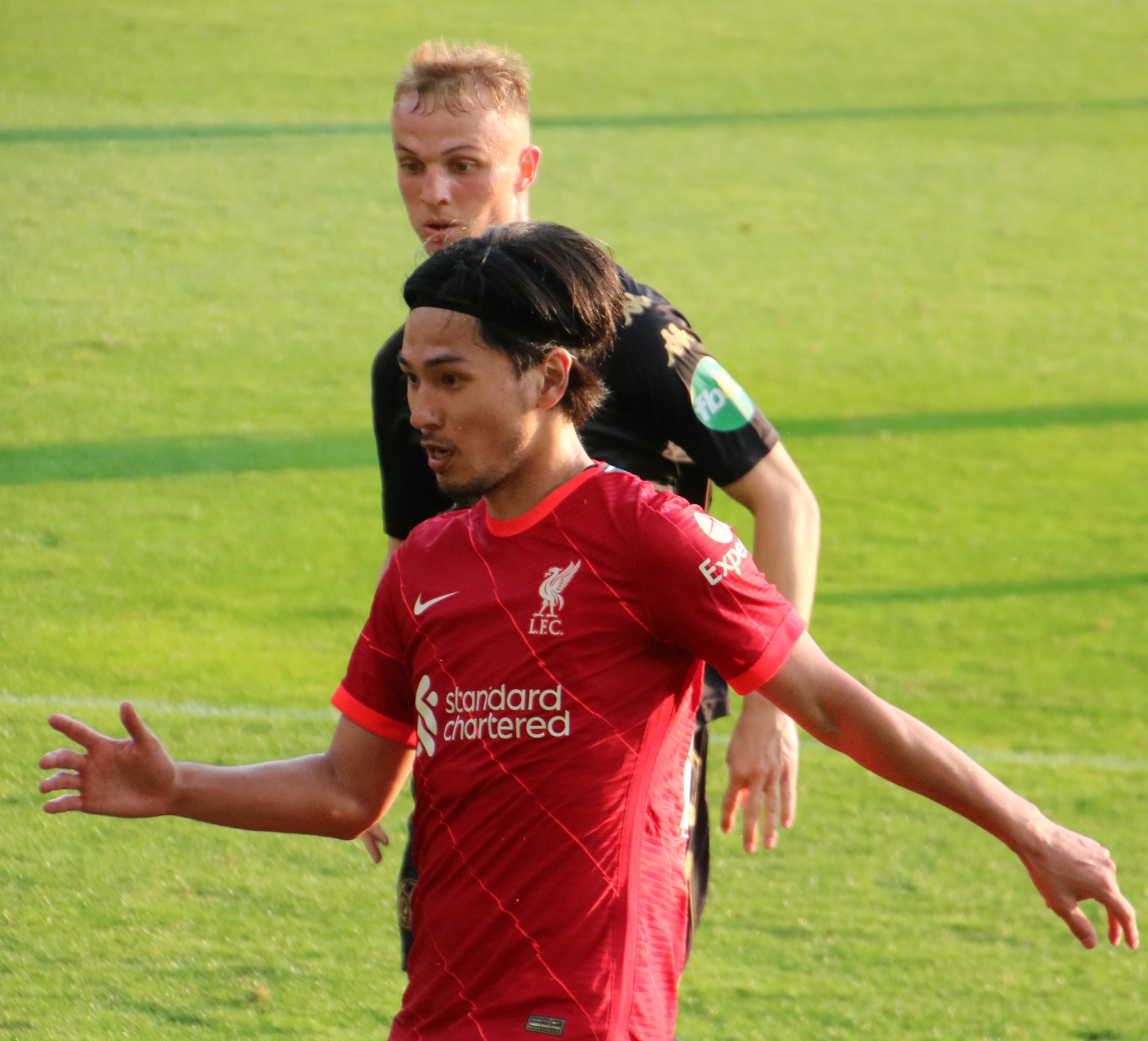
Minamino (front) playing for Liverpool in 2021

On 20 November 2021, Minamino netted his first goal at Anfield for Liverpool in a 4–0 home win against Arsenal. On 22 December 2021, Minamino scored a last-minute equaliser against Leicester City in the EFL Cup. The match eventually went to a penalty shoot-out, and although Minamino missed his penalty, Liverpool went through
5–4. Minamino was an unused substitute as Liverpool went on to win the competition by beating Chelsea 10–11 on penalties in the final on 27 February, with the game ending 0–0 after extra time.

On 6 February 2022, Minamino scored in a 3–1 win against Cardiff City in the 2021–22 FA Cup fourth round, and two goals in the fifth round to take Liverpool to the quarter-finals. Liverpool went on to win the competition on 15 May by beating Chelsea in the final, which ended in a 0–0 draw after extra time and Liverpool winning 5–6 in the penalty shoot-out, although Minamino was not named in Liverpool's matchday squad.

=== Monaco ===
On 28 June 2022, Monaco announced that Minamino signed a four-year contract until June 2026, worth a fixed €15m (£12.9m) and €3m (£2.6m) in add-ons. He took part in only 12 matches during the first half of the season, scoring one goal and one assist in the same match, a 3–0 away win against Stade de Reims. His lackluster debut season in Monaco disappointed, among others, sporting director Paul Mitchell.

Under the guidance of Adi Hütter, who coached him when he arrived in Europe at Red Bull Salzburg in 2015, Minamino began the 2023–24 season as a first-team regular against Clermont Foot and provided an assist for Vanderson's first goal of the season. He scored twice at home against Strasbourg on Matchday 2 and also provided an assist for his captain Wissam Ben Yedder. He was still in the starting line-up for the following matchday and played a part in the draw at FC Nantes, scoring with a header from close range. On Matchday 4 of Ligue 1, he set up Aleksandr Golovin for ASM's 3–0 win over Lens at Stade Louis-II. At the end of the 2023–24 season, Minamino's impressive performances throughout the season led to him being named into the Ligue 1 Fans' Team of season, as well as being voted the club's player of the season.

Minamino had another strong season in 2024–25 and scored 9 goals and provided 5 assists across all competitions, finishing as the club's joint second top scorer behind Mika Biereth. On 21 December 2025, he sustained an anterior cruciate ligament injury during a Coupe de France away match against Auxerre which would sideline him for several months.

== International career ==
=== Youth career ===
Minamino previously represented the Japan U15 and U16 sides. At one point, while playing for Japan U16, he was called up for the AFC U-16 Championship tournament. Minamino helped the side reach the knockout stage, having scored three times in the group stage, including a brace against Vietnam U16. He then scored in a 3–1 win over Iraq U16 in the quarter-finals. However, Japan U16 were eliminated by North Korea U16 in the semi-finals, in a 2–1 loss during which Minamino scored the national side's only goal of the match. Despite this, he finished the tournament's top scorer, alongside Timur Khakimov.

In June 2011, Minamino selected for the Japan U-17 national team for the 2011 U-17 World Cup. He played four matches and scored a goal against New Zealand U17.

In October 2014, Minamino was called up by Japan U19 for the AFC U-19 Championship, leading him to withdraw from Cerezo Osaka's first team for three matches. He scored the opening goal in Matchday 1 of the group stage, in a 2–1 loss against China U19. Minamino later scored two more goals in Matchday Three of the Group stage, in a 2–1 win over South Korea U19 to send through to the knockout stage. However, in the quarter-finals of the AFC U-19 Championship against North Korea U19, Minamino scored an equaliser from a penalty, sending the match into extra time and then a penalty shoot-out, where he missed the decisive penalty, leading North Korea U19 to go through. Despite this, Minamino scored four goals in the tournament.

In January 2016, Minamino was called up by Japan U23 for the AFC U-23 Championship in Qatar. He was featured all the matches in the tournament and helped Japan U23 reach the final after beating Iraq U23 2–1 in the semi-finals. However, Minamino did not feature in the final against South Korea, as he was recalled back to the first team by Red Bull Salzburg. Japan then won the tournament for the first time after winning 3–2 in the game.

In August 2016, Minamino selected for the Japan U-23 team for the 2016 Summer Olympics. He played all 3 matches and scored a goal against Nigeria.

=== Senior career ===
In May 2014, Minamino was included in the Japan national team for the preliminary 30-man squad for the FIFA World Cup in Brazil. However, he failed to make the cut.

Minamino made his debut for Japan in a friendly against Iran on 13 October 2015, coming on as a substitute in the 87th minute, in a 1–1 draw. A month later on 17 November 2015, he made his second appearance for Japan in a FIFA World Cup qualification match against Cambodia, coming on as a substitute in the 86th minute, in a 2–0 win. In August 2018, Minamino was called up to the senior national team for the first time in three years. He scored his first Japan goal, in a 3–0 win over Costa Rica on 11 September 2018. This was followed by scoring against Panama and a brace against Uruguay.

In December 2018, Minamino was one of 23 Japanese players selected for the 2019 AFC Asian Cup. In January 2019, he made his Asian Cup debut against Turkmenistan, providing an assist. In the semi-final against Iran, Minamino assisted twice and won Japan a penalty, which was successfully converted by Yuya Osako. He scored his first ever Asian Cup goal in the final against Qatar, but ended up losing 3–1. Minamino made a total of six appearances in the tournament. Minamino went on to score five more goals for Japan by the end of 2019.

== Style of play ==
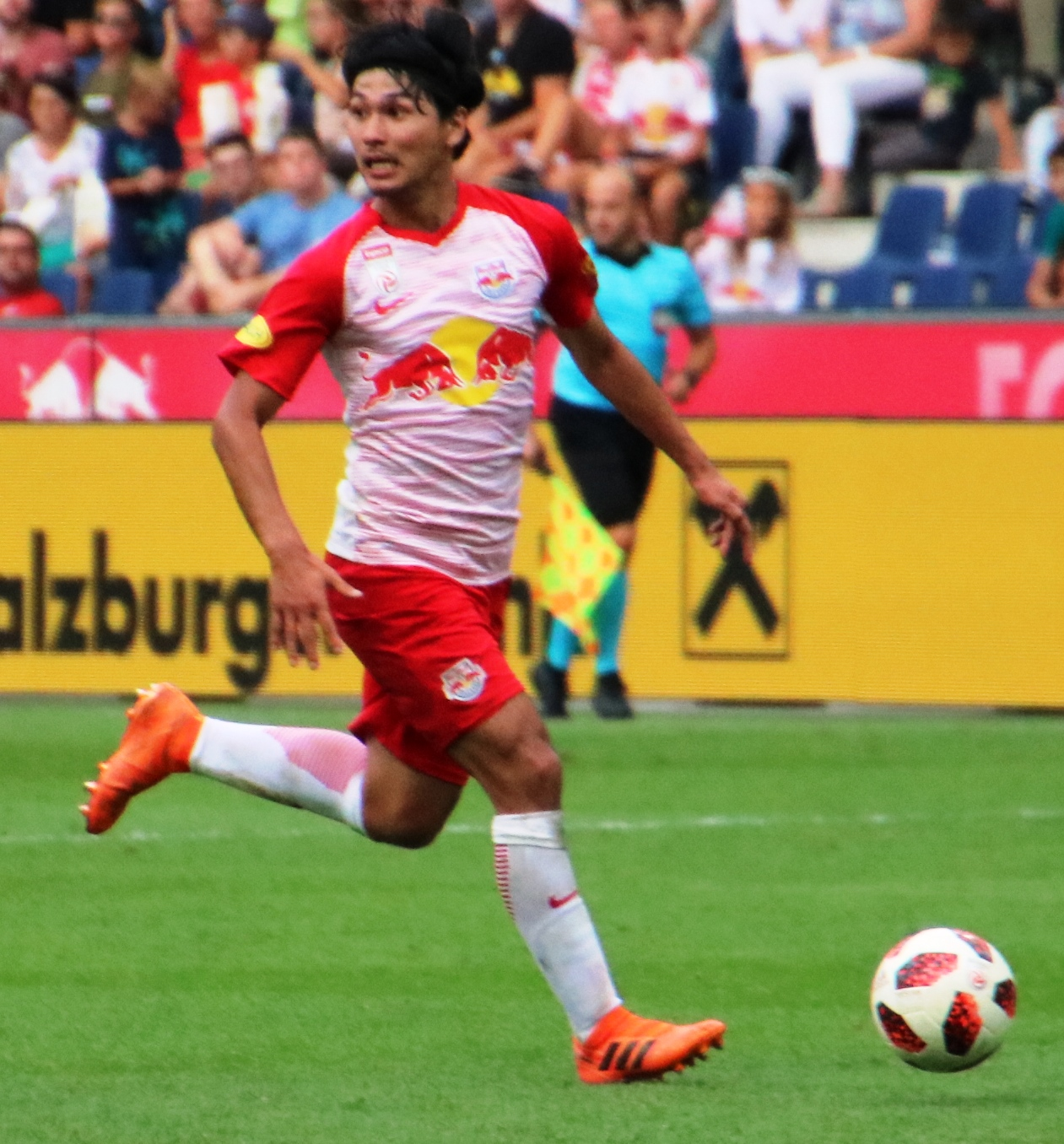
Minamino playing for Red Bull Salzburg 2018

At Salzburg, Minamino was played in a fluid attacking role that allowed him to move freely and 'unlock doors, pick a pass and move with an elegant gait.'

His comparatively slight frame has been described as an 'advantage' as his low centre-of-gravity means he can 'run past players with ease'.

Liverpool manager Jürgen Klopp has heaped praise on him, saying, prior to him signing for Liverpool, "I'd like to have Minamino in Liverpool. He's classy. The best talent." After a game against Ajax in the Champions League, Klopp said "He's everywhere, he defends like a devil and then offensively he's really involved."

== Personal life ==
It was announced on 14 January 2014 that Minamino had achieved a Guinness World Record after completing 187 high‑fives in one minute while running along Komagawa Shopping Street. In addition to speaking Japanese, he speaks German due to his time at Red Bull Salzburg.

Minamino is affectionately called "Taki" (derived from first name Takumi) by his friends and teammates.

== Career statistics ==
=== Club ===
As of match played 21 November 2026

Appearances and goals by club, season and competition
Club	Season	League			National cup (Note: Includes Emperor's Cup, Austrian Cup, FA Cup, Coupe de France)		League cup (Note: Includes J.League Cup, EFL Cup)		Continental		Other		Total	
Club	Season	Division	Apps	Goals	Apps	Goals	Apps	Goals	Apps	Goals	Apps	Goals	Apps	Goals
Cerezo Osaka	2012	J1 League	3	0	1	0	0	0	—		—		4	0
Cerezo Osaka	2013	J1 League	29	5	1	0	8	3	—		—		38	8
Cerezo Osaka	2014	J1 League	30	2	1	1	2	2	7 (Note: Appearances in AFC Champions League)	2	—		40	7
Cerezo Osaka	Total		62	7	3	1	10	5	7	2	—		82	15
Red Bull Salzburg	2014–15	Austrian Bundesliga	14	3	2	0	—		1 (Note: Appearance(s) in UEFA Europa League)	0	—		17	3
Red Bull Salzburg	2015–16	Austrian Bundesliga	32	10	6	2	—		2	1	—		40	13
Red Bull Salzburg	2016–17	Austrian Bundesliga	21	11	5	3	—		5 (Note: One appearance in UEFA Champions League, four appearances in UEFA Europa League)	0	—		31	14
Red Bull Salzburg	2017–18	Austrian Bundesliga	28	7	4	1	—		12 (Note: Three appearances and one goal in UEFA Champions League, nine appearances and two goals in UEFA Europa League)	3	—		44	11
Red Bull Salzburg	2018–19	Austrian Bundesliga	27	6	5	3	—		13 (Note: Three appearances and one goal in UEFA Champions League, ten appearances and four goals in UEFA Europa League)	5	—		45	14
Red Bull Salzburg	2019–20	Austrian Bundesliga	14	5	2	2	—		6 (Note: Appearance(s) in UEFA Champions League)	2	—		22	9
Red Bull Salzburg	Total		136	42	24	11	—		39	11	—		199	64
Liverpool	2019–20	Premier League	10	0	3	0	—		1	0	—		14	0
Liverpool	2020–21	Premier League	9	1	1	0	2	2	4	0	1 (Note: Appearance in FA Community Shield)	1	17	4
Liverpool	2021–22	Premier League	11	3	4	3	5	4	4	0	—		24	10
Liverpool	Total		30	4	8	3	7	6	9	0	1	1	55	14
Southampton (loan)	2020–21	Premier League	10	2	—		—		—		—		10	2
Monaco	2022–23	Ligue 1	18	1	1	0	—		6 (Note: Two appearances in UEFA Champions League, four appearances in UEFA Europa League)	0	—		25	1
Monaco	2023–24	Ligue 1	30	9	1	0	—		—		—		31	9
Monaco	2024–25	Ligue 1	31	6	2	0	—		9	3	1 (Note: Appearance in Trophée des Champions)	0	43	9
Monaco	2025–26	Ligue 1	15	3	1	0	—		5	1	—		21	4
Monaco	2026–27	Ligue 1	4	0	0	0	—		2 (Note: Appearances in UEFA Conference League)	0	—		6	0
Monaco	Total		98	19	5	0	—		14	4	1	0	126	23
Career total			336	74	40	15	17	11	76	17	3	1	468	118

=== International ===
As of match played 14 November 2026

Appearances and goals by national team and year
National team	Year	Apps	Goals
Japan	2015	2	0
Japan	2018	5	4
Japan	2019	15	7
Japan	2020	4	1
Japan	2021	9	4
Japan	2022	12	1
Japan	2023	4	0
Japan	2024	14	7
Japan	2025	8	2
Japan	2026	1	0
Total		74	26

As of match played 14 November 2025
Japan score listed first, score column indicates score after each Minamino goal.

List of international goals scored by Takumi Minamino
No.	Date	Venue	Cap	Opponent	Score	Result	Competition	Ref.
1	11 September 2018	Panasonic Stadium Suita, Suita, Japan	3	Costa Rica	2–0	3–0	2018 Kirin Challenge Cup	
2	12 October 2018	Denka Big Swan Stadium, Niigata, Japan	4	Panama	1–0	3–0	2018 Kirin Challenge Cup	
3	16 October 2018	Saitama Stadium 2002, Saitama, Japan	5	Uruguay	1–0	4–3	2018 Kirin Challenge Cup	
4	16 October 2018	Saitama Stadium 2002, Saitama, Japan	5	Uruguay	4–2	4–3	2018 Kirin Challenge Cup	
5	1 February 2019	Zayed Sports City Stadium, Abu Dhabi, United Arab Emirates	13	Qatar	1–2	1–3	2019 AFC Asian Cup	
6	5 September 2019	Kashima Soccer Stadium, Kashima, Japan	18	Paraguay	2–0	2–0	2019 Kirin Challenge Cup	
7	10 September 2019	Thuwunna Stadium, Yangon, Myanmar	19	Myanmar	2–0	2–0	2022 FIFA World Cup qualification	
8	10 October 2019	Saitama Stadium 2002, Saitama, Japan	20	Mongolia	1–0	6–0	2022 FIFA World Cup qualification	
9	15 October 2019	Central Republican Stadium, Dushanbe, Tajikistan	21	Tajikistan	1–0	3–0	2022 FIFA World Cup qualification	
10	15 October 2019	Central Republican Stadium, Dushanbe, Tajikistan	21	Tajikistan	2–0	3–0	2022 FIFA World Cup qualification	
11	14 November 2019	Dolen Omurzakov Stadium, Bishkek, Kyrgyzstan	22	Kyrgyzstan	1–0	2–0	2022 FIFA World Cup qualification	
12	13 November 2020	Liebenauer Stadium, Graz, Austria	25	Panama	1–0	1–0	Friendly	
13	30 March 2021	Fukuda Denshi Arena, Chiba, Japan	28	Mongolia	1–0	14–0	2022 FIFA World Cup qualification	
14	28 May 2021	Fukuda Denshi Arena, Chiba, Japan	29	Myanmar	1–0	10–0	2022 FIFA World Cup qualification	
15	28 May 2021	Fukuda Denshi Arena, Chiba, Japan	29	Myanmar	7–0	10–0	2022 FIFA World Cup qualification	
16	7 June 2021	Panasonic Stadium Suita, Suita, Japan	30	Tajikistan	2–1	4–1	2022 FIFA World Cup qualification	
17	1 February 2022	Saitama Stadium 2002, Saitama, Japan	37	Saudi Arabia	1–0	2–0	2022 FIFA World Cup qualification	
18	1 January 2024	Japan National Stadium, Tokyo, Japan	52	Thailand	5–0	5–0	Friendly	
19	14 January 2024	Al Thumama Stadium, Doha, Qatar	53	Vietnam	1–0	4–2	2023 AFC Asian Cup	
20	14 January 2024	Al Thumama Stadium, Doha, Qatar	53	Vietnam	2–2	4–2	2023 AFC Asian Cup	
21	11 June 2024	Edion Peace Wing Hiroshima, Hiroshima, Japan	59	Syria	5–0	5–0	2026 FIFA World Cup qualification	
22	5 September 2024	Saitama Stadium 2002, Saitama, Japan	60	China	3–0	7–0	2026 FIFA World Cup qualification	
23	5 September 2024	Saitama Stadium 2002, Saitama, Japan	60	China	4–0	7–0	2026 FIFA World Cup qualification	
24	15 November 2024	Gelora Bung Karno Stadium, Jakarta, Indonesia	64	Indonesia	2–0	4–0	2026 FIFA World Cup qualification	
25	14 October 2025	Ajinomoto Stadium, Chōfu, Japan	71	Brazil	1–2	3–2	2025 Kirin Challenge Cup	
26	14 November 2025	Toyota Stadium, Toyota, Japan	72	Ghana	1–0	2–0	2025 Kirin Challenge Cup	

== Honours ==
Red Bull Salzburg

- Austrian Bundesliga: 2014–15, 2015–16, 2016–17, 2017–18, 2018–19, 2019–20
- Austrian Cup: 2014–15, 2015–16, 2016–17, 2018–19

Liverpool

- Premier League: 2019–20
- EFL Cup: 2021–22
- UEFA Champions League runner up: 2021–22

Japan U23

- AFC U-23 Asian Championship: 2016

Japan

- AFC Asian Cup runner-up: 2019

Individual

- J.League Rookie of the Year: 2013
- Japan Professional Sports Grand Prize's Rookie Award: 2013
- IFFHS Asian Men's Team of the Year: 2020, 2022
- FA Cup Team of the Season: 2021–22
- UNFP Ligue 1 Player of the Month: August 2023
- Ligue 1 Fans' Team of the Season: 2023–24
- Monaco Player of the Season: 2023–24
