= Raufoss IL =

Norwegian sports club

- Full name: Raufoss IL Fotball
- Founded: February 10, 1918; 108 years ago
- Ground: Nammo Stadion, Raufoss, Norway
- Capacity: 2,500
- Chairman: Mathias Engebakken
- Head coach: Ole Petter Berget
- League: 1. divisjon
- 2026: 1. divisjon, 16th of 16 (relegated)
- Website: https://www.raufossfotball.no/
Home colours	Away colours	Third colours

Raufoss IL is a sports club from Raufoss, Norway. The club was formed in 1918. The football section played in the Norwegian top flight between 1937 and 1948, between 1957 and 1960, in 1964 and between 1973 and 1974. The club currently plays in 1. divisjon, the second tier of the Norwegian football league system. Since 2015, they have played their home games at Nammo Stadion.

In 2007 Raufoss returned to the 1. divisjon and were able to finish in eleventh place, after being relegated from the second tier in 2004. However, due to financial problems and failure to meet demands on infrastructure, the Football Association of Norway decided not to award Raufoss the required license for play in the top two divisions. Raufoss were demoted to the 2. divisjon and their place given to Sparta Sarpsborg, who finished in thirteenth place. In June 2023, the club hired a mental coach Antti Peltonen to their coaching staff.

== Recent history ==
Season		Pos.	Pl.	W	D	L	GS	GA	P	Cup	Notes
2006	2. divisjon	↑ 1	26	17	6	3	72	38	57	Third round	Promoted to the 1. divisjon
2007	1. divisjon	↓ 11	30	10	5	15	37	61	35	Second round	Relegated to the 2. divisjon
2008	2. divisjon	4	26	13	4	9	55	37	43	Second round	
2009	2. divisjon	2	26	16	2	8	65	39	50	Second round	
2010	2. divisjon	4	26	13	3	10	41	38	42	Second round	
2011	2. divisjon	3	24	13	3	8	57	41	42	First round	
2012	2. divisjon	2	26	13	7	6	54	26	46	Third round	
2013	2. divisjon	2	26	16	3	7	54	35	51	Second round	
2014	2. divisjon	4	26	15	5	6	64	43	50	Second round	
2015	2. divisjon	↑ 1	26	20	4	2	76	28	64	Second round	Promoted to the 1. divisjon
2016	1. divisjon	↓ 16	30	6	3	21	33	62	21	First round	Relegated to the 2. divisjon
2017	2. divisjon	2	26	14	5	7	53	28	47	Second round	Eliminated in the Promotion play-offs qualifying round to Notodden
2018	2. divisjon	↑ 1	26	16	5	5	64	30	53	Second round	Promoted to the 1. divisjon
2019	1. divisjon	11	30	12	2	16	47	59	38	Second round	
2020	1. divisjon	6	30	11	10	9	53	44	42	Cancelled	Eliminated in the Promotion play-offs first round to Åsane
2021	1. divisjon	11	30	10	5	15	51	54	34	Fourth round	
2022	1. divisjon	12	30	9	8	13	35	54	35	First round	
2023	1. divisjon	9	30	10	8	12	35	36	38	Quarter final	
2024	1. divisjon	8	30	11	8	11	34	35	41	Fourth round	
2025	1. divisjon	13	30	7	9	14	43	56	29	Second round	
2026	1. divisjon	↓ 16	30	6	2	22	31	80	20	First round	Relegated to the 2. divisjon

== Players ==
=== Current squad ===
As of 3 September, 2026

Note: Flags indicate national team as defined under FIFA eligibility rules; some limited exceptions apply. Players may hold more than one non-FIFA nationality.

No.	Pos.	Nation	Player
1	GK	NOR	Anders Klemensson
2	DF	NOR	Jørgen Sjøl
3	DF	NOR	Eirik Åsvestad (captain)
4	DF	NOR	Sebastian Gjelsvik
5	DF	NOR	Eskil Furre Gjerde
6	DF	NOR	Erik Frøysa (on loan from Aalesund)
7	MF	NOR	Emil Sildnes
8	MF	NOR	Harald Holter
9	FW	NOR	Adrian Rogulj
10	FW	NOR	Markus Aanesland
11	DF	NOR	Nicolai Fremstad
12	GK	NOR	David Synstelien
13	DF	SWE	Alexander Achinioti-Jönsson

No.	Pos.	Nation	Player
14	MF	GHA	Yaw Agyeman
15	DF	DEN	Elias Gärtig
16	DF	NOR	Mads Orrhaug Larsen (on loan from HamKam)
17	MF	NOR	Kristian Lønstad Onsrud (on loan from Stabæk)
19	FW	NOR	Håvard Vatland Karlsen (on loan from Haugesund)
22	DF	SEN	Samba Boye Coulibaly
25	MF	NOR	Tinus Engebakken
27	FW	NOR	Rafik Zekhnini
30	FW	NOR	Jonas Dalen Korsaksel
31	MF	NOR	Ulrik Danbolt
32	GK	NOR	Martin Ødegård Dalby
77	GK	MTN	Abderrahmane Sarr (on loan from Tromsø)

For season transfers, see List of Norwegian football transfers winter 2025–26, and List of Norwegian football transfers summer 2026.

=== Out on loan ===
Note: Flags indicate national team as defined under FIFA eligibility rules; some limited exceptions apply. Players may hold more than one non-FIFA nationality.

No. / Pos. / Nation / Player; - / DF / NOR / Oskar Sangnes (at Gjøvik-Lyn until 31 December 2026)	No. / Pos. / Nation / Player; - / MF / NOR / Torje Naustdal (at Hønefoss until 31 December 2026)

== Athletics ==
The club has an athletics section, with Olympic sprinter John Ertzgaard being the most prominent member.
