= Apathya yassujica =

Conservation status
- Least Concern (IUCN 3.1)

Scientific classification
- Kingdom: Animalia
- Phylum: Chordata
- Class: Reptilia
- Order: Squamata
- Family: Lacertidae
- Genus: Apathya
- Species: A. yassujica

Binomial name
- Apathya yassujica (Nilson, Rastegar-Pouyani, Rastegar-Pouyani, & Andrén, 2003)

Synonyms
- Lacerta yassujica Nilson, Rastegar-Pouyani, Rastegar-Pouyani, & Andrén, 2003; Apathya yassujica Arnold et al., 2007

Species of lizard

Apathya yassujica, the Yassujian lizard, is a species of lizard endemic to Iran.
