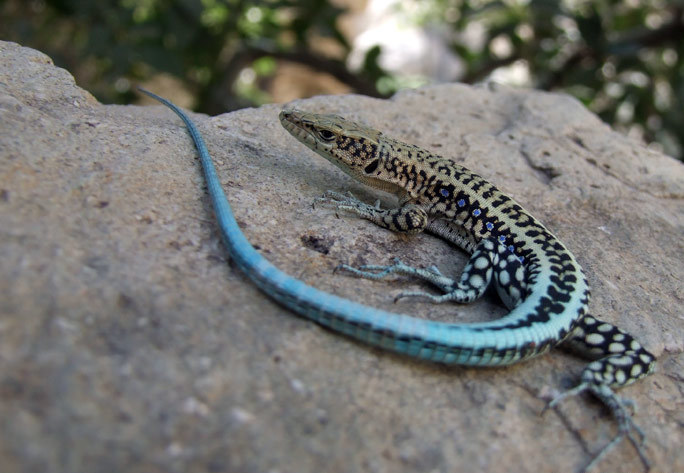
- Apathya cappadocica

Scientific classification
- Kingdom: Animalia
- Phylum: Chordata
- Class: Reptilia
- Order: Squamata
- Family: Lacertidae
- Tribe: Lacertini
- Genus: Apathya; Méhelÿ, 1907

Species
- See text

= Apathya =

Genus of lizards

Apathya is a lizard genus of the Lacertidae family.

== Species ==
- Apathya cappadocica (Werner, 1902) - Anatolian lizard
- Apathya yassujica (Nilson, Rastegar-Pouyani, Rastegar-Pouyani & Andrén, 2003) - Yassujian lizard
