= Spain national under-16 football team =

Under-16 association football team representing Spain

Spain Under-16
- Nickname: La Rojita (The Little Red One)
- Association: Real Federación Española de Fútbol
- Confederation: UEFA (Europe)
- Head coach: David Gordo
- Most caps: Ángel Cuéllar (26)
- Top scorer: Diego Ernesto Santiago (20)
- FIFA code: ESP
First colours	Second colours

First international
- Spain 5–1 Portugal (Mérida, Spain; 23 December 1980)

Biggest win
- Spain 7–0 Luxembourg (Fraga, Spain; 3 April 1985); Spain 7–0 Liechtenstein (Alcalá, Spain; 28 February 1990)

Biggest defeat
- France 3–0 Spain (Gottsdorf, Austria; 1 May 1996) Records for competitive matches only.

European Under-16 Championship
- Appearances: 16 (first in 1985)
- Best result: Champions (1986, 1988, 1991, 1997, 1999, 2001)

FIFA U-15 World Cup & Festival
- Appearances: 1 (first in 2026)
- Best result: Champions (2026)

Spain national under-16 football team
Medal record

U-16 European Championship
Bronze medal – third place	1985 Hungary	Team
Gold medal – first place	1986 Greece	Team
Gold medal – first place	1988 Spain	Team
Gold medal – first place	1991 Spain	Team
Silver medal – second place	1992 Cyprus	Team
Silver medal – second place	1995 Belgium	Team
Gold medal – first place	1997 Germany	Team
Bronze medal – third place	1998 Scotland	Team
Gold medal – first place	1999 Czech Republic	Team
Gold medal – first place	2001 England	Team

The Spain national under-16 football team represents Spain in international football for children under 16 and is controlled by the Royal Spanish Football Federation, which is the governing body for football in Spain.

Spain U16 is the current champion of the FIFA U-15 World Cup & Festival, having won the 2026 inaugural edition.

== Competitive record ==
=== FIFA U-17 World Cup record ===
Year	Round	GP	W	D*	L	GS	GA
(China) 1985	did not qualify						
(Canada) 1987	did not qualify						
(Scotland) 1989	did not qualify						
Total	0/3	0	0	0	0	0	0

=== FIFA U-15 World Cup & Festival ===
Year	Result	Position	GP	W	D*	L	GS	GA
(Azerbaijan) 2026	Champions	1st	10	9	1	0	42	9
Total	1/1	1 title	10	9	1	0	42	9

=== UEFA European Under-17 Championship record ===
Year	Round	GP	W	D*	L	GS	GA
(Italy) 1982	Qualifying round	4	2	0	2	8	6
(West Germany) 1984	Qualifying round	6	4	0	2	12	3
(Hungary) 1985	Third place	7	4	3	0	14	0
(Greece) 1986	Champions	7	6	1	0	18	2
(France) 1987	Qualifying round	2	0	1	1	2	4
(Spain) 1988	Champions	5	3	2	0	8	2
(Denmark) 1989	Fourth place	7	3	2	2	12	9
(East Germany) 1990	Group stage	5	4	0	1	14	2
(Switzerland) 1991	Champions	7	5	1	1	17	6
(Cyprus) 1992	Runners-up	7	5	1	1	18	6
(Turkey) 1993	Quarterfinals	6	3	1	2	6	4
(Republic of Ireland) 1994	Group stage	7	5	1	1	18	7
(Belgium) 1995	Runners-up	8	7	0	1	14	3
(Austria) 1996	Group stage	5	3	0	2	13	5
(Germany) 1997	Champions	8	6	2	0	21	6
(Scotland) 1998	Third place	8	4	2	2	10	7
(Czech Republic) 1999	Champions	8	8	0	0	26	2
(Israel) 2000	Quarterfinals	6	4	0	2	15	6
(England) 2001	Champions	8	6	1	1	16	3
Total	16/19	121	82	18	21	262	83

* Draws include knockout matches decided by penalty shootout.
** Gold background colour indicates first place finish. Silver background colour indicates second place finish. Bronze background colour indicates third place finish. Red border colour indicates tournament was held on home soil.

== Player records ==
=== Top appearances ===
Rank	Player	Club(s)	Year(s)	U-16 caps
1	Ángel Cuéllar	Betis	1987–1989	26
2	Julio Iglesias	Barcelona	1987–1989	21
	Álvaro Pérez	Athletic Bilbao	1990–1992	21
4	Curro Montoya	Hércules	1992–1993	20
	Diego Ribera	Valencia	1993–1994	20
6	Iker Casillas	Real Madrid	1996–1998	19
	Enrique Medina	Manises, Valencia	1990–1991	19
	Francisco Rufete	Atlético Benejúzar, Barcelona	1992–1993	19
	Sandro	Tenerife, Real Madrid	1990–1991	19
10	Carlos Castro	Sevilla	1990–1991	18
	Juan Carlos	La Cruz Villanovense, Barcelona	1990–1991	18
	Jero Miñarro	Valencia	1992–1994	18
	Líbero Parri	Valencia	1998–1999	18
	Iván Pérez	Real Madrid	1991–1992	18

Note: Club(s) represents the permanent clubs during the player's time in the Under-16s.

=== Top goalscorers ===
Rank	Player	Club(s)	Year(s)	U-16 goals
1	Diego Ribera	Valencia	1993–1994	20
2	Iván Pérez	Real Madrid	1991–1992	13
3	Ángel Cuéllar	Betis	1987–1989	11
	Joseba Etxeberria	Real Sociedad	1992–1994	11
	David Rodríguez	Atlético Madrid	2001–2002	11
	Fernando Torres	Atlético Madrid	2001	11
7	Álvaro Pérez	Athletic Bilbao	1990–1992	9
8	Jorge Perona	Barcelona	1998–1999	8
9	Oskitz Estefanía	Real Sociedad	2001–2002	7
	Julen Guerrero	Athletic Bilbao	1989–1990	7
	Miguel Mateos	Real Madrid	1996–1997	7

Note: Club(s) represents the permanent clubs during the player's time in the Under-16s.

== Former squads ==
- 2001 UEFA European Under-16 Football Championship squads - Spain
- 1994 UEFA European Under-16 Football Championship squads - Spain

== See also ==
- Spain national football team
- Spain national under-23 football team
- Spain national under-21 football team
- Spain national under-20 football team
- Spain national under-19 football team
- Spain national under-18 football team
- Spain national under-17 football team
- Spain national under-15 football team
- Spain national youth football team
