= Doğa Kaya =

Turkish footballer

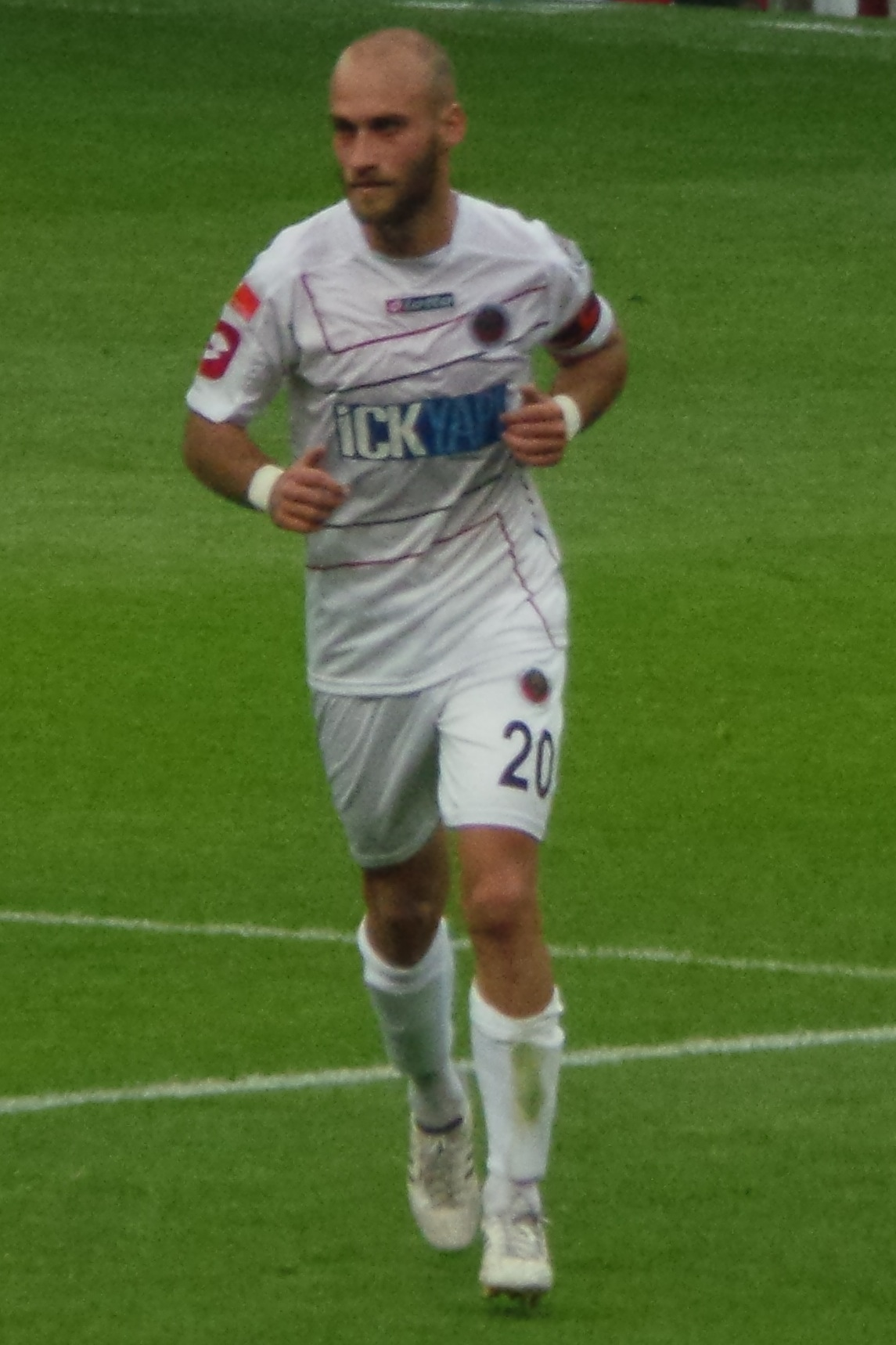

Personal information
- Date of birth: June 30, 1984 (age 42)
- Place of birth: Ankara, Turkey
- Height: 1.77 m (5 ft 10 in)
- Position: Midfielder

Youth career
- 1995–1999: Petrolofisi
- 1999–2002: Gençlerbirliği

Senior career*
Years	Team	Apps	(Gls)
2002–2007	Gençlerbirliği	10	(0)
2004–2005	→ Antalyaspor (loan)	18	(2)
2006–2007	→ Hacettepe (loan)	24	(0)
2007–2011	Eskişehirspor	93	(6)
2011–2012	Antalyaspor	20	(0)
2012–2013	Sivasspor	8	(0)
2013–2016	Gençlerbirliği	61	(0)
2016–2017	Göztepe	11	(0)

International career
1999–2000	Turkey U15	20	(3)
1999–2001	Turkey U16	18	(1)
1999–2001	Turkey U17	10	(1)
2000–2001	Turkey U18	5	(0)
2002	Turkey U19	6	(0)
2003	Turkey U20	1	(0)
2005	Turkey	5	(0)
- * Club domestic league appearances and goals

Doğa Kaya (born June 30, 1984) is a former Turkish football player who played in central midfielder position. He has capped 85 times in various National Team levels of Turkey except category A.
