= Aleksandr Kondrashov =

Russian footballer

Personal information
- Full name: Aleksandr Aleksandrovich Kondrashov
- Date of birth: 30 May 1984 (age 42)
- Height: 1.88 m (6 ft 2 in)
- Position: Defender

Senior career*
Years	Team	Apps	(Gls)
2000–2007	FC Krylia Sovetov Samara	0	(0)
2000	→ FC Krylia Sovetov-2 Samara	9	(0)
2004	→ FC Chernomorets Novorossiysk (loan)	7	(0)
2004–2005	→ FC Mordovia Saransk (loan)	40	(0)
2008	FC Yunit Samara	12	(0)
- * Club domestic league appearances and goals

Aleksandr Aleksandrovich Kondrashov (Russian: Александр Александрович Кондрашов; born 30 May 1984) is a former Russian football player.

== Club career ==
He played in the Russian Football National League for FC Chernomorets Novorossiysk and FC Mordovia Saransk in 2004.

== International career ==
He represented Russia at the 2001 UEFA European Under-16 Championship.
