= Sergei Kryuchikhin =

Russian footballer

Personal information
- Full name: Sergei Pavlovich Kryuchikhin
- Date of birth: 15 January 1984 (age 42)
- Place of birth: Krasnodar, Russian SFSR
- Height: 1.82 m (6 ft 0 in)
- Position: Defender

Youth career
- FC Krasnodar-2000

Senior career*
Years	Team	Apps	(Gls)
2001–2002	FC Krasnodar-2000	27	(0)
2003–2005	FC Arsenal Kyiv	1	(0)
2003	→ FC CSKA Kyiv	3	(0)
2003	→ FC Arsenal-2 Kyiv	1	(0)
2007–2008	FC Zimbru Chişinău	8	(0)
2008	FC Dynamo Krasnodar		
2009–2010	FC Torpedo Armavir	50	(3)
2011–2013	FC Gornyak Uchaly	56	(5)
2013–2014	FC Torpedo Armavir	21	(0)
2014	FC SKChF Sevastopol	10	(0)
2015	FC Omega Kurganinsk		
2016	FC Kuban Holding Pavlovskaya		
2017	FC Vityaz-Memorial Starominskaya		
2017	FC Magnat Krasnodar		
2017	FC Rus Dneprovskaya		
2019	FC Magnat Krasnodar		
- * Club domestic league appearances and goals

Sergei Pavlovich Kryuchikhin (Russian: Серге́й Павлович Крючихин; born 15 January 1984) is a Russian former professional footballer.
