= Neil Arndale =

English footballer

Personal information
- Full name: Neil Darren Arndale
- Date of birth: 26 April 1984 (age 42)
- Place of birth: Bristol, England
- Height: 5 ft 9 in (1.75 m)
- Position: Defender

Youth career
- ?–2002: Bristol Rovers

Senior career*
Years	Team	Apps	(Gls)
2002–2004	Bristol Rovers	5	(0)
2003–2004	→ Clevedon Town (loan)	23	(0)
2004–2006	Cirencester Town		
2006–2011	Mangotsfield United		
2011	Cirencester Town	10	(0)
2011–2012	Mangotsfield United		
2012–????	Mangotsfield United		

International career
2000–2001	England U16	7	(0)
- * Club domestic league appearances and goals as of 09:23, 12 February 2010 (UTC)

Neil Darren Arndale (born 26 April 1984) is a former professional footballer who plays as a defender. He played in The Football League for Bristol Rovers and has also played youth football internationally for England.

Arndale came through the youth ranks at Bristol Rovers and was promoted to the senior squad in 2002. During this time he was selected to play for England under-16s and England under-18s. In all he played five League games and one game in the Football League Trophy for The Pirates, and was also sent out on loan to Clevedon Town on what the club referred to as 'work experience' terms.

He was released by Bristol Rovers in 2004 and dropped down into non-League football. He spent two years with Cirencester Town, where he was club captain, before joining Mangotsfield United in 2006. Arndale was linked heavily with a move to Gloucester City during his spell with Mangotsfield however rejected the decision to move up the pyramid.

In June 2011, Arndale returned to former club, Cirencester Town. However, in October 2011, he left the club, and returned to Mangotsfield United.

He joined Mangotsfield United in 2011 but in January 2012 left the club, as he wished to take a break from football due to work commitments. A few months later however in May 2012, he returned to Mangotsfield for a third spell, moving to Larkhall Athletic in 2015.
