= Tommi Koivistoinen =

Finnish former footballer (born 1970)

Personal information
- Full name: Tommi Petteri Koivistoinen
- Date of birth: 10 July 1970 (age 56)
- Place of birth: Tampere, Finland
- Height: 1.84 m (6 ft 0 in)
- Position: Goalkeeper

Youth career
- Ilves

Senior career*
Years	Team	Apps	(Gls)
1988–1990	Ilves	28	(0)
1991–1994	Jazz (Note: The club changed name from Porin Pallo-Toverit after 1991)	114	(0)
1995	TPV	22	(0)
1996–1999	HJK	54	(0)
1999	→ KäPa (loan)	2	(0)
2000	Tampere United	32	(0)
2001	Atlantis	26	(0)
2002–2003	AC Allianssi	9	(0)

International career
1986	Finland U16	7	(0)
1987	Finland U17	7	(0)
1988	Finland U18	1	(0)
1990–1991	Finland U21	3	(0)

Managerial career
- 2004–2005: AC Allianssi (sporting director)
- * Club domestic league appearances and goals

Tommi Petteri Koivistoinen (born 10 July 1970) is a Finnish former professional footballer who played as a goalkeeper.

== Playing career ==
Born in Tampere, Koivistoinen started football in a local club Ilves, making his senior debut in 1988 in first-tier Mestaruussarja.

Later he played for numerous clubs in his native Finland, including Porin Pallo-Toverit (later FC Jazz), Tampereen Pallo-Veikot, HJK Helsinki, Käpylän Pallo, Tampere United, Atlantis and AC Allianssi. While playing for HJK, Koivistoinen represented the club in the 1998–99 UEFA Champions League group stage. Koivistoinen won two Finnish championship titles, with Jazz in 1993 and with HJK in 1997.

During his youth years, he represented Finland at under-16, under-17, under-18 and under-21 youth international levels.

Koivistoinen announced his retirement in January 2004. During his career, Koivistoinen made 276 appearances in Finnish top-tier Veikkausliiga. He was named in the Veikkausliiga Hall of Fame in 2008.

== Later career ==
After retiring from his playing career, Koivistoinen worked as a sporting director of his last club AC Allianssi during 2004–2005.

Since early 2024, Koivistoinen is working as a marketing director of Finnish ice hockey club Kiekko-Vantaa in second-tier Mestis.

== Personal life ==
His son Eetu Koivistoinen is a professional ice hockey player. His younger son Jesse is a former footballer.

== Career statistics ==
As of 31 December 2003

Appearances and goals by club, season and competition
Club	Season	Division	League		Europe		Total	
Club	Season	Division	Apps	Goals	Apps	Goals	Apps	Goals
Ilves	1988	Mestaruussarja			–			
Ilves	1989	Mestaruussarja			–			
Ilves	1990	Veikkausliiga	19	0	–		19	0
Ilves	Total		28	0	0	0	28	0
Porin Pallo-Toverit	1991	Veikkausliiga	28	0	–		28	0
Jazz	1992	Veikkausliiga	33	0	–		33	0
Jazz	1993	Veikkausliiga	28	0	–		28	0
Jazz	1994	Veikkausliiga	25	0	2 (Note: Appearances in UEFA Cup)	0	27	0
Jazz	Total		114	0	2	0	116	0
TPV	1995	Veikkausliiga	22	0	1	0	23	0
HJK Helsinki	1996	Veikkausliiga	14	0	3	0	17	0
HJK Helsinki	1997	Veikkausliiga	23	0	2 (Note: Appearances in UEFA Cup Winners' Cup)	0	25	0
HJK Helsinki	1998	Veikkausliiga	15	0	7 (Note: Appearances in UEFA Champions League)	0	22	0
HJK Helsinki	1999	Veikkausliiga	2	0	0	0	2	0
HJK Helsinki	Total		54	0	12	0	67	0
KäPa (loan)	1999	Kakkonen	2	0	–		2	0
Tampere United	2000	Veikkausliiga	32	0	–		32	0
Atlantis	2001	Veikkausliiga	26	0	–		26	0
AC Allianssi	2002	Veikkausliiga	9	0	–		9	0
AC Allianssi	2003	Veikkausliiga	0	0	–		0	0
AC Allianssi	Total		2	0	0	0	2	0
Career total			315	0	15	0	330	0

== Honours ==
Ilves

- Finnish Cup: 1990

Jazz

- Veikkausliiga: 1993

HJK

- Veikkausliiga: 1997
- Finnish Cup: 1996, 1998
- Finnish League Cup: 1996, 1997, 1998

Atlantis

- Finnish Cup: 2001
