= Siiri Välimaa =

Finnish footballer (born 1990)

Personal information
- Full name: Siiri Vilhelmiina Välimaa
- Date of birth: 14 April 1990 (age 36)
- Place of birth: Rauma, Finland
- Height: 1.83 m (6 ft 0 in)
- Position: Goalkeeper

Team information
- Current team: TPS
- Number: 1

Youth career
- 1997–2006: Pallo-Iirot

Senior career*
Years	Team	Apps	(Gls)
2007–2008	Pallo-Iirot		
2009–2013	NiceFutis	68	(0)
2014–2016	Kolbotn IL	57	(0)
2017–2018	Grand Bodø	42	(0)
2019–	TPS	20	(0)
- * Club domestic league appearances and goals as of 21:10, 1 May 2020 (UTC) ‡ National team caps and goals as of 5 December 2013

Siiri Vilhelmiina Välimaa (born 10 April 1990) is a Finnish footballer who currently plays for TPS of the Naisten Liiga women's premier division. She has previously played for NiceFutis in the Finnish Naisten Liiga for five seasons. Välimaa was a member of Finnish squad at the 2013 Cyprus Cup and 2013 UEFA Women's Euro Championship although she has not yet capped for the Finland national team.

In November 2012 Välimaa trained for the Swedish Damallsvenskan side Djurgårdens IF. Her transfer was cancelled due to Djurgården's relegation. Välimaa signed for Kolbotn in December 2013.
