= Caryl Righetti =

Swiss footballer (born 1984)

Personal information
- Full name: Caryl Righetti
- Date of birth: 18 July 1984 (age 42)
- Place of birth: Switzerland
- Height: 1.70 m (5 ft 7 in)
- Position: Midfielder

Senior career*
Years	Team	Apps	(Gls)
2002–2003	Neuchâtel Xamax FC		
2003–2007	FC Luzern	37	(0)
- * Club domestic league appearances and goals as of 28 July 2006 ‡ National team caps and goals as of 28 July 2006

Caryl Righetti (born 18 July 1984) is a footballer from Switzerland who plays as midfielder. He last played for FC Luzern in the Swiss Super League.
