= Marko Janjetović =

Croatian footballer

Personal information
- Date of birth: 22 April 1984 (age 42)
- Place of birth: Zagreb, SFR Yugoslavia
- Height: 1.86 m (6 ft 1 in)
- Position: Midfielder

Youth career
- Hrvatski Dragovoljac
- 2002–2003: Dinamo Zagreb

Senior career*
Years	Team	Apps	(Gls)
2001–2002	Hrvatski Dragovoljac	9	(0)
2003–2007	Dinamo Zagreb	0	(0)
2003–2004	→ Zrinjski Mostar (loan)		
2004–2006	→ Inter Zaprešić (loan)	28	(2)
2006	→ Međimurje (loan)	14	(2)
2007	→ Hrvatski Dragovoljac (loan)	10	(0)
2007	Međimurje	13	(0)
2008	Vinogradar	9	(2)
2008	FC SKA Rostov-on-Don	11	(0)
2009–2011	Hrvatski Dragovoljac	51	(9)

International career
1999	Croatia U15	1	(0)
2000	Croatia U16	3	(0)
2000–2001	Croatia U17	7	(0)
2002	Croatia U18	1	(0)
2002	Croatia U19	5	(0)
2002–2004	Croatia U20	7	(0)
2004	Croatia U21	3	(0)
- * Club domestic league appearances and goals

Marko Janjetović (born 22 April 1984) is a Croatian former football midfielder. He played central and defensive midfielder position.

== Club career ==
Janjetović began playing football for HŠK Zrinjski Mostar. He spent the next several seasons in the Croatian first division playing with NK Hrvatski dragovoljac, NK Inter Zaprešić and NK Međimurje. In August 2008, he joined Russian First League side FC SKA Rostov-on-Don, and would return to the Croatian league after one season in Rostov.

== International career ==
Janjetović has played for Croatia at various youth levels, but has not yet appeared for the senior team.
