= Petri Sulonen =

Finnish footballer (1963–2024)

Personal information
- Date of birth: 20 June 1963
- Place of birth: Pori, Finland
- Date of death: 22 May 2024 (aged 60)
- Place of death: Pori, Finland
- Position: Defender

Youth career
- 1973–1981: PPT

Senior career*
Years	Team	Apps	(Gls)
1981–1986	PPT	112	(4)
1987–1999	TPS	319	(14)
2000	FC Jazz	20	(0)
Total		451	(18)

International career
1986–1992	Finland	10	(0)
- * Club domestic league appearances and goals

Petri Sulonen (20 June 1963 – 22 May 2024) was a Finnish footballer who played as a defender for PPT, TPS and FC Jazz. Sulonen was capped 10 times for Finland. He died of ALS on 22 May 2024, at the age of 60.

== Honours ==
TPS

- Finnish Cup: 1991, 1994

Individual

- Veikkausliiga Player of the Year: 1994
