= Dariusz Stachowiak =

Polish footballer

Personal information
- Date of birth: 18 July 1984 (age 42)
- Place of birth: Września, Poland
- Height: 1.76 m (5 ft 9 in)
- Position: Midfielder

Youth career
- Sparta Orzechowo

Senior career*
Years	Team	Apps	(Gls)
2002–2005	Lech Poznań	4	(0)
2005	Lilas Vasilikou	10	(0)
2006	Sokół Kleczew		
2006–2009	Górnik Zabrze	27	(1)
2008	→ ŁKS Łódź (loan)	8	(0)
2009	→ Tur Turek (loan)	7	(0)
2009–2010	Stal Stalowa Wola	8	(0)
2010	Aspropyrgos AO		
2010–2011	Sokół Kleczew		
2012	Victoria Września		
2012	Sokół Kleczew	14	(1)
2013	Lubuszanin Trzcianka	1	(0)
2014	KUKS Zębców		
2014	Victoria Września	8	(0)
2015	Stella Luboń		
2017	Las Puszczykowo		
2020–2021	Sparta Orzechowo	5	(0)
2023	Zjednoczeni Września	1	(0)
- * Club domestic league appearances and goals as of 18 July 2024

Dariusz Stachowiak (born 18 July 1984) is a Polish footballer who plays as a midfielder.

== Honours ==
Lech Poznań

- Polish Cup: 2003–04
- Polish Super Cup: 2004
