= Antti Peltonen =

Finnish football coach and former goalkeeper (born 1984)

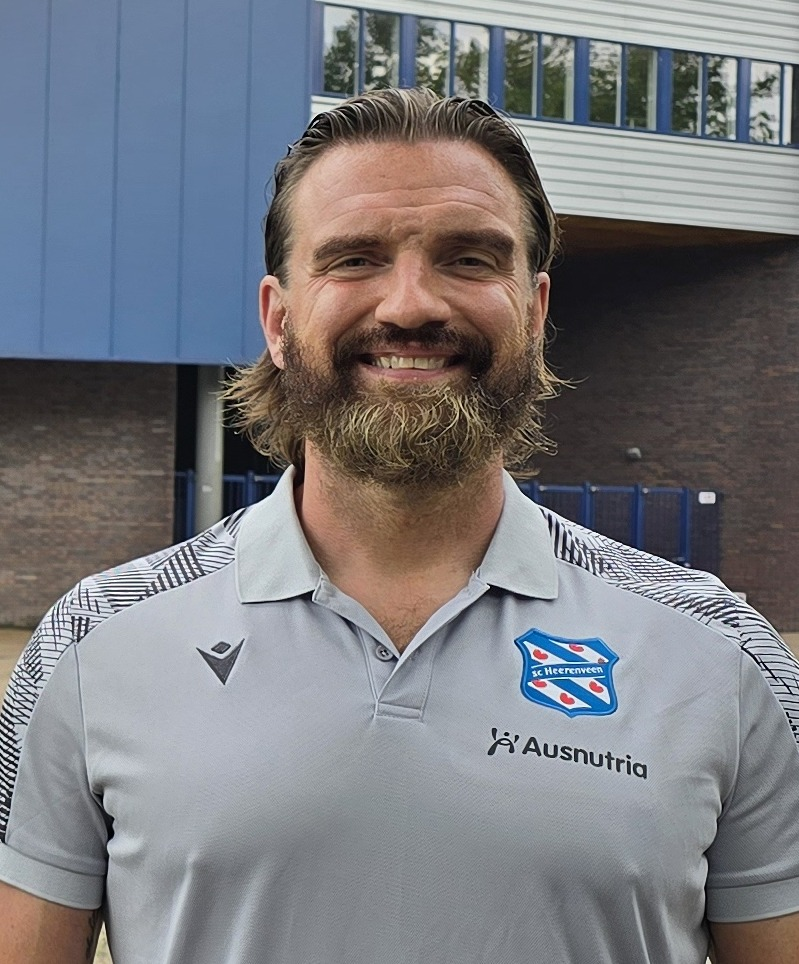
- Peltonen in 2024

Personal information
- Date of birth: 22 April 1984 (age 42)
- Place of birth: Ylöjärvi, Finland
- Height: 1.86 m (6 ft 1 in)
- Position: Goalkeeper

Youth career
- Ilves

Senior career*
Years	Team	Apps	(Gls)
2000–2001	Atlantis	11	(0)
2002–2004	Jaro	16	(0)
2005	PP-70	11	(0)
2005	Lahti	0	(0)
2006	VPS	5	(0)
2007	KPV	16	(0)
2008	Viikingit	2	(0)
2009	Lapuan Virkiä	10	(0)
2012–2014	TPV	36	(0)

International career
2001	Finland U17	3	(0)
2002	Finland U18	5	(0)
2004	Finland U21	1	(0)

Managerial career
- 2016–2017: SJK (mental coach)
- 2020–2022: HJK (mental coach)
- 2023–2024: Raufoss IL (mental coach)
- 2024–: SJK (mental coach)
- 2024–: Heerenveen women (mental coach)
- 2025–: Tromsø IL Academy (mental coach)
- * Club domestic league appearances and goals as of 24 September 2024

Antti Peltonen (born 22 April 1984) is a Finnish football coach and a former professional footballer who played as a goalkeeper. He is currently working as a mental coach for Dutch club Heerenveen women, for Norwegian club Tromsø IL academy and for Finnish club SJK Seinäjoki.

== Playing career ==
Peltonen played in the youth program of Ilves in Tampere. During his senior career, he played in top-tier Veikkausliiga for Atlantis, Jaro, Lahti and Vaasan Palloseura (VPS). He has also represented PP-70, KPV, Viikingit, Lapuan Virkiä and TPV in lower divisions.

He has also represented Finland at under-17, under-18 and under-21 youth international levels. Peltonen represented Finland at the European Under-16 Championship in England in 2001, the European Championship qualifiers in Latvia in 2002, and the High School World Championship in Italy in 2001.

== Coaching career ==
Peltonen was the first Finnish mental coach in the Veikkausliiga, working for SJK Seinäjoki, where they won the Finnish Cup and the Veikkausliiga bronze medal. In 2018–2019, Peltonen worked as a sports therapist for the Football Players' Association, Jalkapallon pelaajayhdistys.

From 2020 to 2022, Peltonen worked for Veikkausliiga club HJK Helsinki, winning three consecutive Finnish championships and the Finnish Cup.

In the summer of 2023, Peltonen became the first Finnish mental health professional in a foreign football organization when he started working for Raufoss IL, which plays in the Norwegian second tier. In the 2023 season, Raufoss reached 9th place in the league and the quarter-finals of the Norwegian Cup, and in the 2024 season, they reached 8th place and the quarter-finals of the cup.

In September 2024, Peltonen started also working for the women's team of Heerenveen. In addition, he is also working part time with SJK Seinäjoki.

In early 2025, Peltonen began working at the academy of Tromsø IL.

Peltonen is a DipHE by education.

== Personal life ==
Peltonen has previously been part of a Finnish male show dance group Scandinavian Hunks. He was also the Bachelor in the Finnish version of the Bachelor reality TV-show in 2008.
