= Nikolay Abramov (footballer, born 1984) =

Russian footballer (1984–2010)

Personal information
- Full name: Nikolay Alexandrovich Abramov
- Date of birth: 5 January 1984
- Place of birth: Kasimov, Ryazan Oblast, Russian SFSR, Soviet Union
- Date of death: 30 December 2010 (aged 26)
- Place of death: Kasimov, Ryazan Oblast, Russia
- Height: 1.78 m (5 ft 10 in)
- Position: Defender

Youth career
- FC Kristall Kasimov
- FC Spartak Moscow

Senior career*
Years	Team	Apps	(Gls)
2001–2003	FC Spartak Moscow	0	(0)
2004–2005	FC Baltika Kaliningrad	21	(0)
2006–2007	FC Spartak-MZhK Ryazan	40	(2)
2007–2008	FC Sheksna Cherepovets	43	(0)
2009	FC Ryazan	14	(0)
2010	FC Zvezda Ryazan	0	(0)

International career
2004	Russia U-21	3	(0)
- * Club domestic league appearances and goals

Nikolay Alexandrovich Abramov (Russian: Николай Александрович Абрамов; 5 January 1984 – 30 December 2010) was a Russian professional football player.

== Club career ==
He made his Russian Football National League debut for FC Baltika Kaliningrad on 28 March 2004 in a game against FC Lokomotiv Chita.
