= Janne Vellamo =

Finnish footballer (born 1984)

Personal information
- Date of birth: 28 September 1984 (age 42)
- Place of birth: Kaarina, Finland
- Height: 1.78 m (5 ft 10 in)
- Position: Midfielder

Team information
- Current team: FF Jaro
- Number: 6

Senior career*
Years	Team	Apps	(Gls)
2003–2008	TPS Turku	87	(1)
2007	LoPa (loan)		
2009	FF Jaro	28	(0)
- * Club domestic league appearances and goals as of 8 October 2009

Janne Vellamo (born 28 September 1984) is a Finnish footballer.
