= Marcus Rickert =

German footballer (born 1984)

Personal information
- Date of birth: 18 February 1984 (age 42)
- Place of birth: Rostock, East Germany
- Height: 1.91 m (6 ft 3 in)
- Position: Goalkeeper

Youth career
- –1999: Lichterfelder FC
- 1999–2003: Hansa Rostock

Senior career*
Years	Team	Apps	(Gls)
2003–2006	Hansa Rostock II	15	(0)
2006–2008	Kickers Emden	36	(0)
2008–2010	TuS Koblenz	5	(0)
2010–2011	Sportfreunde Lotte	0	(0)
2011	SV Wilhelmshaven	17	(0)
2011–2013	Rot-Weiß Erfurt	24	(0)
2013	VfL Osnabrück	5	(0)
2013–2015	Viktoria Berlin	38	(0)
2015–2018	VSG Altglienicke	85	(0)

International career
2001	Germany U-18	1	(0)
- * Club domestic league appearances and goals as of 1 July 2018

Marcus Rickert (born 18 February 1984) is a German footballer who plays as a goalkeeper.
