= Bram De Ly =

Belgian footballer

Personal information
- Date of birth: 21 January 1984 (age 42)
- Place of birth: Bruges, Belgium
- Height: 1.82 m (6 ft 0 in)
- Position: Centre-back

Youth career
- 1990–2004: Club Brugge

Senior career*
Years	Team	Apps	(Gls)
2004–2005	Club Brugge	0	(0)
2005–2006	Torhout	28	(3)
2006–2010	Kortrijk	98	(7)
2010–2012	Dender	40	(0)
2012–2013	Racing Waregem		
2013–2015	Torhout	33	(1)
- * Club domestic league appearances and goals

Bram de Ly (born 21 January 1984) is a Belgian former professional footballer who played as a centre-back.

== Career ==
He joined to KM Torhout in 2005, where he came from Club Brugge. de Ly left after four years KV Kortrijk and signed in August 2010 with FCV Dender EH.
