= John Schot =

Dutch footballer

Personal information
- Full name: John Schot
- Date of birth: 7 February 1984 (age 42)
- Place of birth: Tholen, Netherlands
- Height: 1.71 m (5 ft 7 1/2 in)
- Position: Midfielder

Team information
- Current team: Kloetinge

Youth career
- 1993–1999: RBC
- 1999–2005: PSV
- 2005–2006: NEC

Senior career*
Years	Team	Apps	(Gls)
2006–2007	Kloetinge	22	(8)
2007–2008	Hoek	14	(0)
2008	Tholense Boys	26	(1)
2008–2010	RBC	48	(3)
2010–2011	Hoek	13	(1)
2011–	Kloetinge		
- * Club domestic league appearances and goals as of 16 September 2010

John Schot (born 7 February 1984 in Tholen) is a Dutch footballer plays as a midfielder for amateurs VV Kloetinge.

== Career ==
He made his debut in the Eredivisie for RBC Roosendaal on 8 August 2008 against FC Omniworld replacing Sasa Stojanovic as a substitute. He scored his first goal against RKC Waalwijk. He successively played also for HSV Hoek.
