= Anton Grebnev =

Russian footballer

Personal information
- Full name: Anton Vladimirovich Grebnev
- Date of birth: 16 May 1984 (age 42)
- Place of birth: Saratov, Russian SFSR
- Height: 1.78 m (5 ft 10 in)
- Position: Midfielder

Senior career*
Years	Team	Apps	(Gls)
2001–2003	FC Sokol Saratov	7	(0)
2004	FC Rotor Volgograd (reserves)		
2005	FC Sokol Saratov	18	(1)
2006	FC Saturn Yegoryevsk	13	(0)
2007–2010	FC Sokol Saratov	45	(3)
2011–2012	FC Olimpia Gelendzhik	28	(4)
2012	FC Baikal Irkutsk	7	(0)

International career
2004	Russia U-21	2	(0)
- * Club domestic league appearances and goals

Anton Vladimirovich Grebnev (Russian: Антон Владимирович Гребнев; born 16 May 1984) is a Russian former professional football player.

He made his debut in the Russian Premier League in 2001 for FC Sokol Saratov.
