= Denis Zabrodin =

Russian footballer

Personal information
- Full name: Denis Aleksandrovich Zabrodin
- Date of birth: 25 January 1984 (age 42)
- Height: 1.82 m (5 ft 11 1/2 in)
- Position: Midfielder

Youth career
- Volga Saratov
- FC Sokol Saratov

Senior career*
Years	Team	Apps	(Gls)
2000	FC Sokol-D Saratov		
2001–2002	FC Sokol Saratov	0	(0)
2003–2004	FC Iskra Engels	33	(0)
2005	FC Nosta Novotroitsk	30	(0)
2006–2007	FC Metallurg-Kuzbass Novokuznetsk	37	(7)
2007	FC Vityaz Podolsk	0	(0)
2008–2009	FC Sokol Saratov	37	(1)
- * Club domestic league appearances and goals

Denis Aleksandrovich Zabrodin (Russian: Денис Александрович Забродин; born 25 January 1984) is a former Russian professional football player.

== Club career ==
He played in the Russian Football National League for FC Metallurg-Kuzbass Novokuznetsk in 2007.
