= Timur Khamitov =

Russian footballer

Personal information
- Full name: Timur Rasikhovich Khamitov
- Date of birth: 4 April 1984 (age 42)
- Place of birth: Sibay, Russian SFSR
- Height: 1.87 m (6 ft 1 1/2 in)
- Position: Forward

Senior career*
Years	Team	Apps	(Gls)
2000–2001	Spartak-Orekhovo Orekhovo-Zuyevo	30	(4)
2002	Mostransgaz Gazoprovod	30	(2)
2003–2006	Shinnik Yaroslavl	0	(0)
2005	→ Slavia Mozyr (loan)	7	(0)
2006	→ Ditton Daugavpils (loan)	4	(0)
2008	Taksist Ufa		

International career
2002–2003	Russia U-21	5	(0)
- * Club domestic league appearances and goals

Timur Rasikhovich Khamitov (Russian: Тимур Расихович Хамитов; born 4 April 1984) is a Russian former football player.

He represented Russia at the 2001 UEFA European Under-16 Championship.
