= Georgy Sukhov =

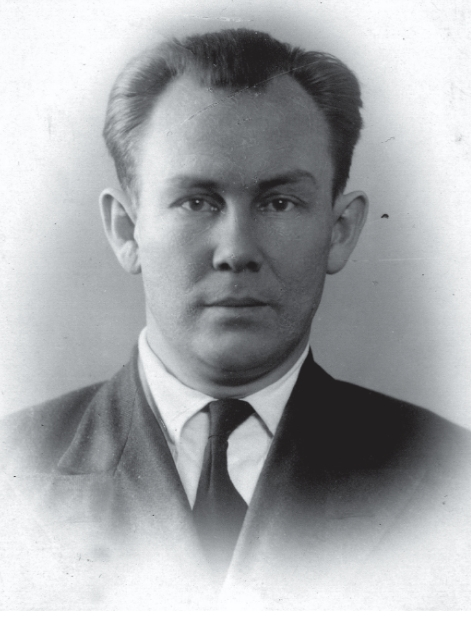
In 1940

Georgy Fyodorovich Sukhov in German form as Georgi Fedorowitsch Suchow (Георгий Фёдорович Сухов; 26 March 1899 – February 1942) was a Russian and Soviet herpetologist. He specialized on the genus Lacerta.

== Life and work ==
Sukhov was born in Khilpovka, Poltava Governorate, where his father Fedor was Zemstvo physician who came from a peasant family in Kaluga and his mother was a school teacher. His father, Fedor, was arrested in 1905 for organizing peasant unions and on release, the family moved to Kiev. Suhov studied in the 7th Kiev Gymnasium from 1909 and apprenticed as a fitter in a military workshop. From 1918 to 1920 he was a member of the left socialist revolutionary party. In 1919 he worked with the Kiev council of workers' deputies. In 1920 he was conscripted into the Red Army and worked in the administration of the Kiev military district. He joined the physics and mathematics faculty of Kiev University in 1918 but was able to resume studies only after demobilization in 1921. He studied lizards under Vladimir Mikhailovich Artobolevsky (1874–1952). From 1922 he worked with the union of education workers, serving as a librarian. He married Berta Vladimirovna Zlochevskaya who also worked as a librarian, in 1928. Between 1926 and 1930 Sukhov worked with the zoological museum, examining the herpetofauna of Ukraine, particularly the lizards of the genus Lacerta. He studied age-related and geographic variation within the species, publishing first in 1926. He examined the differences between Lacerta agilis and Lacerta viridis. A department of herpetology was established with Sergei Fyodorovich Tsarevsky (1887–1971) as head. In 1929 Sukhov was arrested as part of a purge, especially because he attended church. He was released and he became the head of the department of herpetology. He joined the postgraduate program of the USSR Academy of Sciences and completed his doctorate at Leningrad in 1932. He published on the postembryonic development of the anal and head shields, examining the variation in the femoral pores. He identified that Lacerta viridis does not extend further north of the forest-steppe zone. He described the form Lacerta agilis boemica in 1929. He continued research after 1933 at the zoological museum in Leningrad, serving also as librarian and biology consultant. In 1940 he sought transfer from the zoological institute to the first medical institute where he gave lectures. He suffered from starvation during the siege of Leningrad and died in February 1942.
