= Mikhail Sukhov =

Russian footballer

Personal information
- Full name: Mikhail Viktorovich Sukhov
- Date of birth: 4 June 1984 (age 42)
- Height: 1.76 m (5 ft 9 1/2 in)
- Positions: Defender; midfielder

Senior career*
Years	Team	Apps	(Gls)
2000–2006	FC Krylia Sovetov Samara	0	(0)
2000	→ FC Krylia Sovetov-2 Samara	6	(0)
2004	→ FC Krylia Sovetov-3 Samara		
2006	FC Shakhter Karagandy	6	(0)
2007	Astana	4	(0)
2008	FC Spartak Semey	22	(7)
- * Club domestic league appearances and goals as of 30 April 2015

Mikhail Viktorovich Sukhov (Russian: Михаил Викторович Сухов; born 4 June 1984) is a former Russian football player.

He represented Russia at the 2001 UEFA European Under-16 Championship.
