= Lauri Pirhonen =

Finnish footballer (born 1984)

Personal information
- Date of birth: 3 July 1984 (age 42)
- Place of birth: Noormarkku, Finland
- Height: 1.87 m (6 ft 2 in)
- Position: Goalkeeper

Team information
- Current team: FC Jazz
- Number: 1

Youth career
- 1995: ToVe
- 1996–2001: FC Jazz

Senior career*
Years	Team	Apps	(Gls)
2002–2004	FC Jazz	25	(0)
2002	→ MuSa	14	(0)
2005–2011	FC PoPa	155	(0)
2009	→ PP-70	1	(0)
2010	→ MuSa	2	(0)
2012	FC KooTeePee	26	(0)
2013–	FC Jazz	24	(0)

International career^{‡}
2000	Finland U-16	7	(0)
2001	Finland U-17	7	(0)
- * Club domestic league appearances and goals as of 9 April 2014 ‡ National team caps and goals as of 9 April 2014

Lauri Pirhonen (born 3 July 1984) is a Finnish football goalkeeper currently playing for FC Jazz in the Finnish second tier Ykkönen.

Junnila has previously played 25 matches in the Finnish premier division Veikkausliiga for FC Jazz. He was a member of the Finland squad at the 2001 European U-16 Championship.
