= Toni Junnila =

Finnish footballer (born 1984)

Personal information
- Date of birth: 31 December 1984 (age 41)
- Place of birth: Pori, Finland
- Height: 1.81 m (5 ft 11 in)
- Position: Midfielder

Team information
- Current team: FC Jazz

Youth career
- 1996–2001: FC Jazz

Senior career*
Years	Team	Apps	(Gls)
2002–2003	FC Jazz	45	(7)
2002	→ MuSa	1	(0)
2004–2005	Tampere United	33	(1)
2005	→ FC Hämeenlinna	13	(3)
2006–2008	FF Jaro	43	(7)
2008	→ JBK	4	(1)
2009–2011	FC PoPa	52	(4)
2012–	FC Jazz	53	(4)

International career^{‡}
2003–2004	Finland U21	5	(0)
- * Club domestic league appearances and goals as of 31 March 2014 ‡ National team caps and goals as of 31 March 2014

Toni Junnila (born 31 December 1984) is a Finnish footballer currently playing for FC Jazz in the Finnish second tier Ykkönen.

Junnila has previously played 121 matches in the Finnish premier division Veikkausliiga for FC Jazz, Tampere United and FF Jaro. He was a member of the Finland squad at the 2001 European U-16 Championship.
