= 2012 Finnish Cup =

Association football competition

2012 Suomen Cup
Tournament details
- Country: Finland
- Teams: 198

Final positions
- Champions: FC Honka
- Runners-up: KuPS
- UEFA Europa League: FC Honka

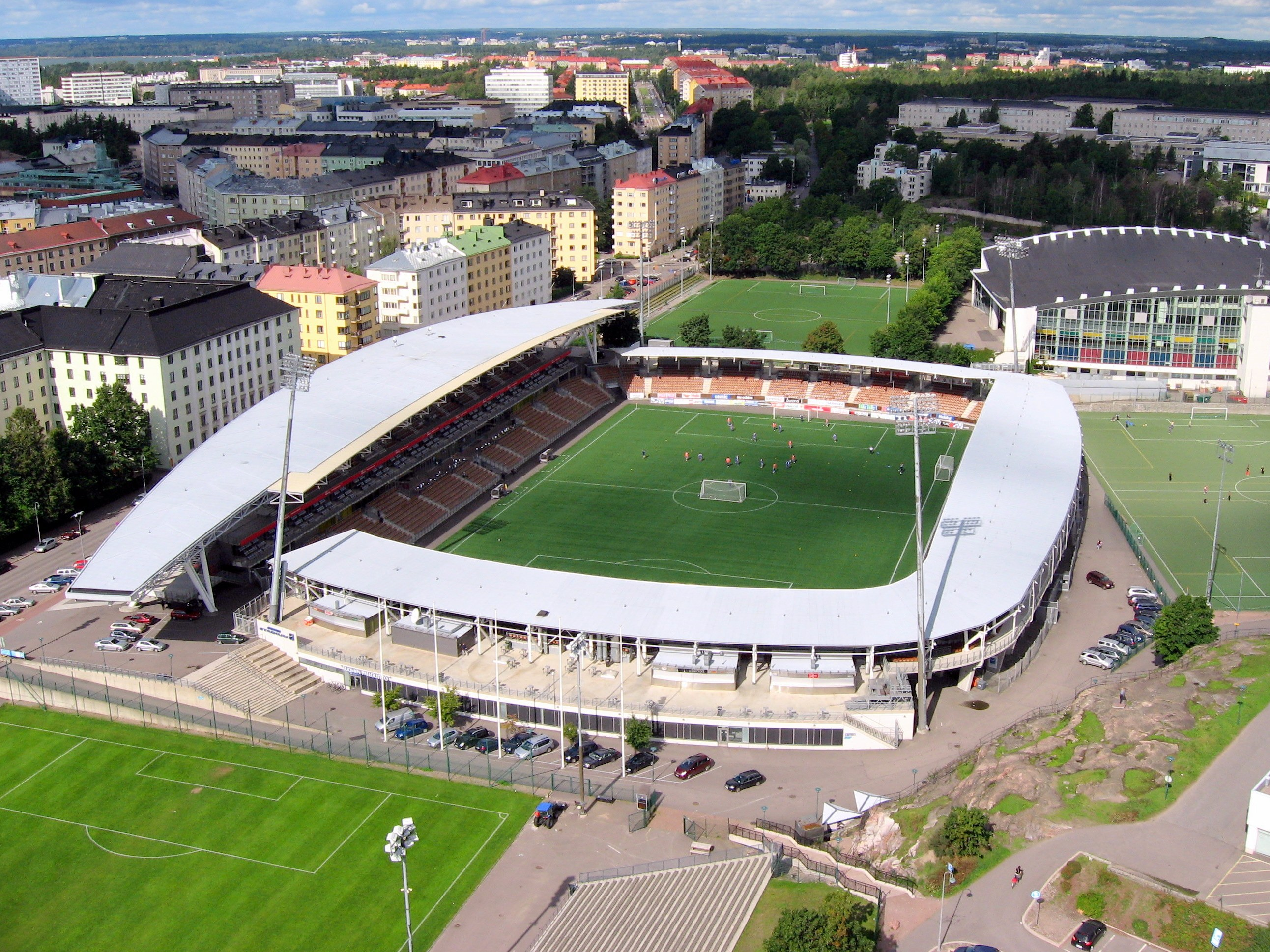
Sonera Stadium, Helsinki - usual venue for the Suomen Cup final

The 2012 Finnish Cup (Finnish: Suomen Cup) is the 58th season of the main annual association football cup competition in Finland. It is organised as a single-elimination knock–out tournament. Participation in the competition is voluntary. A total of 198 teams registered for the competition, with 12 teams from the Veikkausliiga, 10 from the Ykkönen, 28 from the Kakkonen, 54 from the Kolmonen and 94 teams from other divisions.

The tournament started on 6 January 2012 with the first match of Round 1. Many matches in the early rounds are played on artificial pitches in indoor halls.

== Teams ==
Round	Clubs remaining	Clubs involved	Winners from previous round	New entries this round	Leagues entering at this round
Round 1	198	34	none	34	Kolmonen (Tier 4); Nelonen (Tier 5); Vitonen (Tier 6); Kutonen (Tier 7); Seiska (Tier 8)
Round 2	181	126	17	109	see above
Round 3	118	68	63	5	see above
Round 4	84	72	34	38	Ykkönen (Tier 2) - 10 teams Kakkonen (Tier 3) - 28 teams
Round 5	48	40	36	4	Veikkausliiga (Tier 1) - 4 teams
Round 6	28	24	20	4	Veikkausliiga (Tier 1) - 4 teams
Round 7	16	16	12	4	Veikkausliiga (Tier 1) - 4 teams
Quarter-finals	8	8	8	none	none
Semi-finals	4	4	4	none	none
Final	2	2	2	none	none

== Round 1 ==
In this round 34 clubs entered from the Finnish fourth level and below, while the other 109 clubs from the lower divisions received byes to the next round. These matches took place between 6 and 21 January 2012.

Tie no	Home team	Score	Away team	Information
0	FC Helsingin Pumppu	0-4	MPS/Atletico Malmi	
1	HJK j/Laajasalo	3-1	FC Playmates	
2	Gnistan/2	1-0	HJK-j/Töölö	
3	HeKuLa	2-1	HDS	
4	FC A la Plancha Calamar	0-1	Töölön Taisto	
5	Pallo-Pojat juniorit (PPJ)	5-1	FC HEIV	
6	Pallo-Pojat/PPJ Akatemia	6-1	KPR	
7	Football Club Vantaa	0-3	EIF/Akademi	

Tie no	Home team	Score	Away team	Information
8	I-HK M09	1-0	FC Kasiysi TN	
9	FC Korso United	3-4 (p.)	Palloiluseura Apollo	
10	FC Babylon X	4-3 (p.)	Espoon Tikka	
11	IVPA	0-14	AC Vantaa/2	
12	Toivalan Urheilijat	1-0	Joensuun Palloseura	
13	Lehmon Pallo-77	0-1	SC Riverball	
14	Euran Pallo	5-6 (p.)	Toejoen Veikot (TOVE)	
15	Kajaanin Haka	2-1	JS Herkules	
16	FC Lynx	1-4	FC Muurola	

== Round 2 ==
In this round 126 clubs participated from the Finnish fourth level and below. These matches commenced on 14 January 2012.

Tie no	Home team	Score	Away team	Information
17	Toivalan Urheilijat	4-3	Soccer Club Kuopio Futis-98	
18	Nakkilan Nasta	2-3	Toejoen Veikot (TOVE)	
19	Spartak Kajaani	2-0	Kajaanin Haka	
20	HJK j/Laajasalo	3-2	PPV	
21	Gnistan/2	1-2	Helsingin Ponnistus	
22	HeKuLa	1-10	MaKu/Baltika	
23	Töölön Taisto	0-2	SAPA M1	
24	Pallo-Pojat juniorit (PPJ)	2-0	PK-35/VJS	
25	Pallo-Pojat/PPJ Akatemia	1-4	Käpylän Pallo/KäPa	
26	HerTo	0-1	HPS	
27	Pajamäen Pallo-Veikot/5. div.	0-3	Ellas	
28	Kallion Stallions	0-5	HIFK/2	
29	Suurmetsän Urheilijat	0-3	MPS/Atletico Malmi	
30	FC Spede	0-2	IF Gnistan/Roots	
31	SAPA/M3	4-3 (p.)	FC Hieho	
32	Club Latino Espanol	0-3	Kurvin Vauhti	
33	FC POHU	0-4	Gnistan/Ogeli	
34	Töölön Vesa	0-4	SAPA/2	
35	HJK/Kannelmäki	2-4	HIFK/3	
36	FC Babylon X	4-3	Riipilän Raketti	
37	EIF/Akademi	INSERT	Nummelan Palloseura	
38	Nurmijärven Palloseura	3-4 (p.)	I-HK M09	
39	Palloiluseura Apollo	0-2	Lahden Reipas	
40	Korson Palloseura	2-0	Jalkapalloseura Stars	
41	Riihimäen Palloseura	3-2	TuPS	
42	PK Keski-Uusimaa	9-2	Hyvinkään Palloseura	
43	SexyPöxyt	4-0	Lahen Pojat Jalkapalloseura	
44	Salpausselän Reipas	1-0	IF Sibbo-Vargarna	
45	Jokelan Kisa	14-0	FC Kyllikki	
46	FC Keravan Dynamo	2-4	Espoon Palloseura	
47	FC Glid	1-5	Koivukylän Palloseura	
48	F.C. Brunnsparkens Bröder	0-3	KyIF	

Tie no	Home team	Score	Away team	Information
49	AC Vantaa/2	6-1	FC Laatupallo	
50	HC Ränni	4-2	Nurmijärven Palloseura/2	
51	Kaarinan Reipas	0-5	Turun Pallokerho	
52	KaaPS	0-18	Maskun Palloseura	
53	MynPa	0-9	VG-62	
54	Liedon Pallo	2-1	Jyrkkälän Tykit	
55	Åbo Club de Futbol	4-3 (p.)	FC Boda	
56	Nokian Palloseura	5-0	Tervakosken Pato	
57	Tampereen Palloveikot	0-4	Tampereen Peli-Toverit	
58	Parkunmäen Apassit	2-6	Hämeenlinnan Härmä	
59	Ikurin Vire	5-0	Loiske Toivot	
60	FC Vapsi	0-6	Leki-futis	
61	Tampereen FC Futarit	0-3	Sääksjärven Loiske	
62	Bollklubben 48	3-2	Malax IF	
63	Black Islanders	4-0	Lapuan Virkiä (miehet 2)	
64	Kungliga Wasa C.F.	5-6 (p.)	Sisu-Pallo	
65	VPS juniorit	2-6	Lapuan Virkiä	
66	Gamlakarleby Bollklubb 2	0-3	Jakobstads Bollklubb (JBK)	
67	IK Myran	4-2	IFK Jakobstad	
68	Haminan Pallokissat	1-4	Pallo-Peikot (PaPe)	
69	FC SuSi	0-12	Sudet	
70	Kultsu FC/2	0-2	PEPO	
71	FC Peltirumpu	3-0	IPS	
72	Kotkan Kiri	1-4	STPS	
73	Inkeroisten Purha	4-1	Heinolan Palloilijat -47	
74	Karhulan Pojat	0-1	Kotajärjen Pallo	
75	Voikkaan PotkupalloKerho	3-1	Popinniemen Ponnistus	
76	FC Saarijärvi	0-3	Jyväskylän Seudun Palloseura	
77	Football Club Kurd	1-4	FC Vaajakoski	
78	Suolahden Urho	2-6	Souls AC	
79	Palokan Riento	2-4	Jämsänkosken Ilves	

== Round 3 ==
In this round 68 clubs entered from the Finnish fourth level and below. These matches commenced on 5 February 2012.

Tie no	Home team	Score	Away team	Information
80.	HJK-j/Laajasalo	3-4 (p.)	HIFK/2	
81.	Helsingin Ponnistus	2-1	MPS/Atletico Malmi	
82.	IF Gnistan/Roots	0-10	MaKu/Baltika	
83.	SAPA/M3	0-6	SAPA M1	
84.	Pallo-Pojat –juniorit (PPJ)	3-2 (p.)	Kurvin Vauhti	
85.	Gnistan/Ogeli	1-1; 0-3 (p.)	Käpylän Pallo/KäPa	
86.	SAPA/2	1-4	HPS	
87.	Ellas	3-4 (p.)	HIFK/3	
88.	Turun Pallokerho	0-2	SexyPöxyt	
89.	FC Babylon X	3-0	Salpausselän Reipas	
90.	NuPS	5-3	Jokelan Kisa	
91.	I-HK M09	2-0	Espoon Palloseura	
92.	Lahden Reipas	5-0	Koivukylän Palloseura	
93.	KyIF	1–0	Korson Palloseura	
94.	AC Vantaa/2	0-1	Riihimäen Palloseura	
95.	HC Ränni	0-15	PK Keski-Uusimaa	
96.	Liedon Pallo	0-5	Maskun Palloseura	
97.	Åbo Club de Futbol	0-3	VG-62	
98.	Sisu-Pallo	0-3	Toejoen Veikot (TOVE)	

Tie no	Home team	Score	Away team	Information
99.	Black Islanders	2-5	IK Myran	
100.	Kokkolan Palloseura	5-0	Bollklubben-48	
101.	Jakobstads Bollklubb	3-2	Lapuan Virkiä	
102.	Toivalan Urheilijat	4-4; 3-4 (p.)	SC Riverball	
103.	Voikkaan PotkupalloKerho	1-2	FC Peltirumpu	
104.	Kotajärven Pallo	1-7	PEPO	
105.	Inkeroisten Purha	0-6	Sudet	
106.	STPS	2-1	Pallo-Peikot (PAPE)	
107.	Sastamalan Voima 1	7-0	Ikurin Vire	
108.	Nekalan Pallo	1-1; 3-5 (p.)	Nokian Palloseura	
109.	Leki-futis	1-1; 3-5 (p.)	Tampereen Peli-Toverit	
110.	Sääksjärven Loiske	0-2	Hämeenlinnan Härmä	
111.	Souls AC	0-6	FC Vaajakoski	
112.	Jämsänkosken Ilves	0-5	Jyväskylän Seudun Palloseura	
113.	FC Muurola	1-1; 5-4 (p.)	Spartak Kajaani	

== Round 4 ==
In this round 72 clubs participated, including 10 teams from the Ykkönen and 28 teams from the Kakkonen . These matches commenced on 14 February 2012.

Tie no	Home team	Score	Away team	Information
114.	SAPA M1	0–4	FC Kiffen	
115.	LPS	1–1 (5−4 p.)	EsPa	
116.	HIFK	3–0	PK-35 Vantaa	PK-35 withdrew
117.	HIFK/2	0–1	FC Kuusysi	
118.	KäPa	3–3 (5−6 p.)	Atlantis FC	
119.	PK Keski-Uusimaa	2–3	BK-46	Att. 270
120.	HPS	0–4	Klubi 04	
121.	Helsingin Ponnistus	2–3	Riihimäen Palloseura	
122.	IF Gnistan	1–0	FC Viikingit	Att. 179
123.	Pallo-Pojat –juniorit (PPJ)	1–6	EIF	
124.	HIFK/3	1–2	MaKu/Baltika	Att. 120
125.	SexyPöxyt	2–3 (a.e.t.)	Tampereen Pallo-Veikot	
126.	KyIF	1–3	VG-62	
127.	Ilves	1–3	FC Hämeenlinna	Att. 343
128.	Hämeenlinnan Härmä	3–2	STPS	Att. 90
129.	I-HK M09	0–5	NoPS	
130.	Tampereen Peli-Toverit	1−3	Maskun Palloseura	
131.	Sastamalan Voima 1	1–5	NuPS	

Tie no	Home team	Score	Away team	Information
132.	Sudet	1–3	MP	
133.	PEPO	2–3	Lahden Reipas	
134.	ViPa	0–3	FC KooTeePee	ViPa withdrew
135.	FC Vaajakoski	1–3	SC Riverball	Att. 102
136.	LoPa	1–2 (a.e.t.)	JäPS	Att. 40
137.	FC Futura	1–0	KTP	
138.	FC Peltirumpu	1–3	JPS	
139.	FC Babylon X	0–5	FC Espoo	
140.	Toejoen Veikot (TOVE)	2–2 (a.e.t.) (6−7 p.)	KPV	Att. 65
141.	IK Myran	0–11	FC Jazz	
142.	JBK	2–3	GBK	Att. 250
143.	VIFK	1−3	SJK	Att. 148
144.	Kokkolan Palloseura	0–5	Pallo-Iirot	
145.	HauPa	0–4	FC Santa Claus	
146.	PS Kemi	4–1	RoPS	
147.	OPS	0–2	AC Oulu	
148.	FC Muurola	2–0	AC Kajaani	Att. 136
149.	PK-37	0–2	JIPPO	

== Round 5 ==
In this round 40 clubs will participate, including 4 teams from the Veikkausliiga (Teams which have been eliminated from the League Cup). These matches are due to commence on 15 March 2012.

24 March 2012 150	Gnistan	1 − 0	BK-46
16:00

31 March 2012 151	RiPS	1 − 3	FC Kuusysi
17:00

22 March 2012 152	VG-62	0 − 5	FC KooTeePee
18:30

25 March 2012 153	Maskun Palloseura	2 − 3	EIF
18:45

25 March 2012 154	MaKu/Baltika	1 − 8	FC Lahti
19:30

24 March 2012 155	Lahden Reipas	0 − 4	LPS
18:00

10 April 2012 156	Atlantis FC	3 − 0	FC Kiffen

27 March 2012 157	Klubi 04	1 − 2 (a.e.t.)	IFK Mariehamn
16:00

1 April 2012 158	FC Futura	2 − 5	HIFK
18:30

27 March 2012 159	JäPS	2 − 1	FC Espoo
19:00

31 March 2012 160	FC Santa Claus	3 − 4	MP
17:00

25 March 2012 161	SC Riverball	1 − 0	Hämeenlinnan Härmä
15:00

18 March 2012 162	FC Muurola	0 − 5	FC Hämeenlinna
14:30

24 March 2012 163	FC Jazz	3 − 2 (a.e.t.)	SJK
15:30

27 March 2012 164	NoPS	1 − 7	Haka
18:00

31 March 2012 165	PS Kemi	3 − 1 (a.e.t.)	GBK
18:00

22 March 2012 166	KPV	0 – 5	JJK
17:30

24 March 2012 167	NuPS	1 – 7	JIPPO
15:00

24 March 2012 168	TPV	0 – 3	AC Oulu
16:15

25 March 2012 169	JPS	3 − 2 (a.e.t.)	Pallo-Iirot
15:00

== Round 6 ==
In this round 24 clubs will participate, including 4 teams from the Veikkausliiga. These matches are due to commence on 29 March 2012.

7 April 2012 170	JIPPO	1 − 0 (a.e.t.)	FC Lahti
	Tahvanainen 119'

12 April 2012 171	JäPS	0 – 1	Gnistan
			Liesjärvi 57' (o.g.)

6 April 2012 172	MP	0 – 2	MYPA
			Kaipio 29'; Oksanen 62'

10 April 2012 173	FC Hämeenlinna	0 – 4	FC Honka
			Väyrynen 19', 50', 81'; Äijälä 76'

10 April 2012 174	IFK Mariehamn	4 – 1	JJK
	Forsell 39'; Kangaskolkka 47', 75'; Wiklöf 85'		Hilska 37'

12 April 2012 175	AC Oulu	0 – 2	KuPS
			Holopainen 45+1'; Purje 90'

5 April 2012 176	PS Kemi	2 − 2 (a.e.t.) (4 – 5 p)	FF Jaro
	Eissele 26' (pen.), 33'		Tahvanainen 62', 88'

10 April 2012 177	EIF	4 – 1	FC Kuusysi
	Estlander 14', 83'; Lewis 77'; Mirabelli 80'		Puhalainen 19'

15 April 2012 178	Atlantis FC	2 − 2 (a.e.t.) (4 – 2 p)	FC Jazz

1 April 2012 179	JPS	0 – 3	LPS

31 March 2012 180	SC Riverball	0 – 4	Haka

11 April 2012 181	FC KooTeePee	2 – 0	HIFK
	Laaksonen 37'; Wheeler 47'

== Round 7 ==
In this round 16 clubs will participate, including 4 teams from the Veikkausliiga. These matches are due to commence on 24 April 2012.

26 April 2012 182	HJK	2 − 1	FF Jaro
	Mannström 40'; Pohjanpalo 74'		Niang 29'

25 April 2012 183	FC KooTeePee	2 − 1 (a.e.t.)	FC Inter
	Wheeler 73' (pen.), 103' (pen.)		Ojala 79'

25 April 2012 184	Atlantis FC	0 − 3	FC Honka
			Mombilo 25'; Dudu 86'; Väyrynen 87'

26 April 2012 185	LPS	0 − 2	VPS
			Leukkunen 43' (og.); Parikka 67' (pen.)

25 April 2012 186	KuPS	0 − 0 (a.e.t.) (8 – 7 p)	TPS
	Penalties
	Kärkkäinen (penalty scored); James (penalty missed); Taipale (penalty scored); Ilo (penalty scored); Holopainen (penalty scored); Koljonen (penalty scored); Paananen (penalty missed); Mäkinen (penalty scored); Räsänen (penalty scored); Pöntinen (penalty scored)		(penalty scored) Kolehmainen; (penalty scored) Rähmönen; (penalty missed) Ristola; (penalty scored) Hurme; (penalty scored) Pennanen; (penalty scored) Okaru; (penalty missed) Lehtonen; (penalty scored) Tanska; (penalty scored) Kennedy; (penalty missed) Lehtovaara

25 April 2012 187	IF Gnistan	1 – 4	IFK Mariehamn
	J. Kauti 21'		Forsell 6', 14' (pen.); Byskata 77'; Jagne 86'

22 April 2012 188	EIF	0 – 2	JIPPO
			Rönkkö 74'; Itälä 90'

26 April 2012 189	Haka	1 – 2 (a.e.t.)	MYPA
	Robinson 62'		Sihvola 82', 110'

== Quarter-finals ==
In this round 8 clubs will participate. These 4 matches are due to be played on 9 and 10 May 2012.

9 May 2012 190	HJK	3 – 0	FC KooTeePee	Sonera Stadium, Helsinki
	Ashraf 33'; Alho 35'; Zeneli 90+2'			Referee: Jari Järvinen

9 May 2012 191	FC Honka	2 – 0	VPS	Tapiolan urheilupuisto, Espoo
	Äijälä 27' (pen.); Simpanen 57'			Referee: Ville Nevalainen

9 May 2012 192	KuPS	3 – 0	IFK Mariehamn	Savon Sanomat Areena, Kuopio
	Venäläinen 41'; Hynynen 68'; Ilo 85'			Referee: Miikka Lähdesmäki

8 May 2012 193	JIPPO	0 – 3	MYPA	Koillispuiston tekonurmi, Joensuu
			Sihvola 9', 70'; O'Shaughnessy 84'	Referee: Vesa Hätilä

== Semi-finals ==
In this round 4 clubs will participate.

31 May 2012 194	FC Honka	1 – 1 (a.e.t.) (5 – 4 p)	HJK	ISS Stadion, Vantaa
18:30	Tammilehto 14'		Zeneli 52'	Referee: Petteri Kari
	Penalties
	Äijälä (penalty scored); Väyrynen (penalty scored); Koskinen (penalty scored); Yaghoubi (penalty scored); Aalto (penalty scored)		(penalty missed) Okkonen; (penalty scored) Zeneli; (penalty scored) Pelvas; (penalty scored) Ashraf; (penalty scored) Lindström

30 August 2012 195	KuPS	1 – 0	MYPA	Mikkelin Urheilupuisto, Mikkeli
18:30	Puri 37'			Referee: Dennis Antamo

== Final ==
The Suomen Cup final is due to be played on 29 September 2012.

29 September 2012 196	FC Honka	1 – 0	KuPS
	Mäkijärvi 23'			Referee: Mattias Gestranius
