= 2011 Kolmonen – Finnish League Division 3 =

Finnish League Division 3
- Season: 2011
- Champions: EIF (not promoted); AC Vantaa; PK K-U; PEPO; JPS; AC Kajaani; Sporting; NoPS; Masku
- Promoted: 8 teams above and EsPa
- Relegated: 18 teams

League tables for teams participating in Kolmonen, the fourth tier of the Finnish soccer league system, in 2011.

== League Tables 2011 ==
=== Helsinki and Uusimaa ===
==== Section 1 ====
Pos	Team	Pld	W	D	L	GF	GA	GD	Pts	Promotion or relegation
1	EIF	22	19	2	1	122	30	+92	59	Promoted
2	FC HIK	22	12	7	3	59	29	+30	43	
3	NuPS	22	13	3	6	57	34	+23	42	
4	Pöxyt	22	11	7	4	47	28	+19	40	
5	HerTo	22	10	7	5	55	44	+11	37	
6	Spartak	22	9	5	8	49	54	−5	32	
7	FC POHU	22	9	3	10	53	52	+1	30	
8	PuiU	22	6	6	10	43	43	0	24	
9	RiRa	22	6	4	12	29	74	−45	22	
10	Honka/3	22	5	5	12	29	55	−26	20	
11	FC Degis	22	6	1	15	35	75	−40	19	Relegated
12	KyIF FCK	22	0	2	20	16	76	−60	2	Relegated

==== Section 2 ====
Pos	Team	Pld	W	D	L	GF	GA	GD	Pts	Promotion or relegation
1	AC Vantaa	22	18	2	2	80	35	+45	56	
2	EsPa	22	17	2	3	93	27	+66	53	Promoted
3	PK-35/VJS	22	16	3	3	75	28	+47	51	
4	PPV	22	9	4	9	34	51	−17	31	
5	FC Kontu	22	7	5	10	35	35	0	26	
6	HPS	22	7	5	10	42	48	−6	26	
7	FC Espoo /Akatemia	22	8	2	12	45	55	−10	26	
8	TuPS	22	6	7	9	36	53	−17	25	
9	SibboV	22	7	3	12	26	54	−28	24	
10	NouLa	22	6	5	11	35	50	−15	23	
11	Gnistan/Ogeli	22	6	5	11	28	46	−18	23	Relegated
12	Allianssi Vantaa	22	2	3	17	24	71	−47	9	Relegated

==== Section 3 ====
Pos	Team	Pld	W	D	L	GF	GA	GD	Pts	Relegation
1	PK K-U	22	19	2	1	78	21	+57	59	
2	Stars	22	12	3	7	47	41	+6	39	
3	SalReipas	22	11	5	6	66	35	+31	38	
4	HyPS	22	11	4	7	76	31	+45	37	
5	KOPSE	22	11	3	8	46	44	+2	36	
6	SAPA	22	10	4	8	44	29	+15	34	
7	RiPS	22	10	3	9	51	37	+14	33	
8	NJS	22	10	1	11	49	49	0	31	
9	FC Viikingit	22	9	2	11	31	44	−13	29	
10	HDS /Mondial	22	6	2	14	35	55	−20	20	
11	Zenith	22	3	4	15	31	72	−41	13	Relegated
12	FC Puotila	22	3	1	18	18	114	−96	10	Relegated

=== South-East Finland (Kaakkois-Suomi) ===
Pos	Team	Pld	W	D	L	GF	GA	GD	Pts	Relegation
1	PEPO	22	19	2	1	89	18	+71	59	
2	STPS	22	16	2	4	61	30	+31	50	
3	IPS	22	12	4	6	45	27	+18	40	
4	SavU	22	11	5	6	40	28	+12	38	
5	MiKi	22	10	3	9	33	30	+3	33	
6	PaPe	22	7	5	10	41	48	−7	26	
7	Jäntevä	22	6	5	11	27	55	−28	23	
8	Kultsu FC	22	6	4	12	32	51	−19	22	
9	KoRe	22	5	7	10	23	54	−31	22	
10	Sudet/2	22	5	5	12	35	45	−10	20	
11	FC PaSa	22	5	4	13	30	50	−20	19	Relegated
12	HaPK	22	5	4	13	26	46	−20	19	Relegated

=== Central and Eastern Finland (Keski- and Itä-Suomi) ===
Pos	Team	Pld	W	D	L	GF	GA	GD	Pts	Qualification or relegation
1	JPS	20	18	0	2	70	22	+48	54	
2	SC KuFu-98	20	14	1	5	59	25	+34	43	Promotion Playoffs
3	FC Blackbird	20	11	2	7	42	29	+13	35	
4	SiPS	20	10	0	10	41	42	−1	30	
5	BET	20	9	2	9	43	45	−2	29	
6	JoPS	20	9	1	10	44	45	−1	28	
7	Zulimanit	20	8	3	9	40	36	+4	27	
8	SaPa	20	7	3	10	42	65	−23	24	
9	Huima	20	5	2	13	31	49	−18	17	
10	KaPa-51	20	5	2	13	43	76	−33	17	
11	JIlves	20	4	4	12	27	48	−21	16	Relegated

=== Northern Finland (Pohjois-Suomi) ===
Pos	Team	Pld	W	D	L	GF	GA	GD	Pts	Promotion or relegation
1	AC Kajaani	18	17	1	0	98	11	+87	52	Promoted
2	KajHa	18	14	1	3	64	20	+44	43	
3	FC OPA	18	13	2	3	58	24	+34	41	
4	Tervarit	18	10	0	8	43	49	−6	30	
5	OPS-j	18	8	1	9	40	41	−1	25	
6	JS Hercules	18	7	0	11	39	55	−16	21	
7	FC-88	18	5	3	10	29	49	−20	18	
8	Spartak	18	5	2	11	20	51	−31	17	
9	OuTa	18	4	0	14	21	63	−42	12	Relegated
10	AS Moon	18	2	0	16	28	77	−49	6	Relegated

=== Central Ostrobothnia and Vaasa (Keski-Pohjanmaa and Vaasa) ===
Pos	Team	Pld	W	D	L	GF	GA	GD	Pts	Promotion or relegation
1	Sporting	24	17	2	5	67	32	+35	53	Promoted
2	FC Korsholm	24	12	4	8	63	38	+25	40	
3	SIF	24	11	4	9	58	50	+8	37	
4	FC Kiisto a-team	24	11	4	9	48	56	−8	37	
5	Reima	24	11	3	10	42	38	+4	36	
6	Norrvalla FF	24	11	2	11	36	37	−1	35	
7	Karhu	24	10	4	10	65	51	+14	34	
8	Virkiä	24	10	2	12	53	57	−4	32	
9	FC KOMU	24	10	2	12	42	61	−19	32	
10	IFK Jakobstad	24	9	4	11	43	55	−12	31	
11	TUS	24	9	3	12	44	48	−4	30	Relegated
12	VPS-j	24	8	3	13	45	70	−25	27	Relegated
13	Esse IK	24	5	7	12	45	58	−13	22	Relegated

=== Tampere and Satakunta ===
Pos	Team	Pld	W	D	L	GF	GA	GD	Pts	Promotion or relegation
1	NoPS	20	14	3	3	58	15	+43	45	
2	Härmä	20	14	1	5	47	18	+29	43	Promoted
3	PJK	20	10	4	6	37	31	+6	34	
4	EuPa	20	9	4	7	31	40	−9	31	
5	TPV /2	20	8	4	8	40	34	+6	28	
6	TKT	20	8	4	8	30	32	−2	28	
7	FC Tampere FC Tigers	20	8	2	10	33	35	−2	26	
8	PS-44	20	7	3	10	38	42	−4	24	
9	MuSa /2	20	7	3	10	22	35	−13	24	
10	P-Iirot Reservi	20	5	5	10	22	35	−13	20	Relegated
11	FC Rauma	20	1	5	14	19	60	−41	8	Relegated

=== Turku and Åland (Turku and Ahvenanmaa) ===
Pos	Team	Pld	W	D	L	GF	GA	GD	Pts	Relegation
1	Masku	22	18	1	3	58	17	+41	55	
2	SoVo	22	14	3	5	55	24	+31	45	
3	TPK	22	12	5	5	47	31	+16	41	
4	SIFFK	22	12	4	6	56	31	+25	40	
5	KaaPo	22	13	1	8	41	31	+10	40	
6	LTU	22	10	2	10	45	57	−12	32	
7	FC Boda	22	9	2	11	33	42	−9	29	
8	VG-62	22	8	3	11	39	39	0	27	
9	Wilpas	22	6	5	11	29	45	−16	23	
10	PIF	22	5	7	10	30	45	−15	22	
11	FC Inter 2	22	2	5	15	22	49	−27	11	Relegated
12	Lieto	22	3	2	17	29	73	−44	11	Relegated

== References and sources ==
- Finnish FA
- ResultCode
- Kolmonen (jalkapallo) (in Finnish)
