= 2020 Kolmonen – Finnish League Division 3 =

Finnish League Division 3
- Season: 2020

League tables for teams participating in Kolmonen, the fourth tier of the Finnish soccer league system, in 2020. A total of 108 teams compete in the 2020 campaign, split into 9 groupd based on regional locations.

== League tables ==
=== Itä AC ===
Pos	Team	Pld	W	D	L	GF	GA	GD	Pts	Promotion or qualification
1	Jyväskylä Blackbird	5	5	0	0	13	1	+12	15	Promotion to Kakkonen
2	PK-37	7	3	2	2	13	12	+1	11	
3	Riverball	5	3	0	2	9	7	+2	9	
4	Barca	5	2	2	1	5	5	0	8	
5	LehPa	6	2	1	3	6	6	0	7	
6	Komeetat	5	2	1	2	6	8	−2	7	
7	Warkaus	5	1	2	2	10	10	0	5	
8	Kings	6	1	2	3	4	8	−4	5	
9	JPS	5	1	1	3	4	9	−5	4	
10	PAVE	5	0	3	2	4	8	−4	3	
11	Keltik	0	0	0	0	0	0	0	0	
12	ToU	0	0	0	0	0	0	0	0	Relegation to Nelonen

Updated to match(es) played on 23 July 2020. Source: Soccerway
Rules for classification: 1) Points; 2) Goal difference; 3) Goals scored; 4) Head-to-head points; 5) Head-to-head goal difference; 6) Head-to-head goals scored; 7) Fewer away goals conceded; 8) Home goals scored; 9) Fewer home goals conceded; 10) Play-off; 11) Draw

=== Etelä A ===
Pos	Team	Pld	W	D	L	GF	GA	GD	Pts	Promotion or qualification
1	EsPa	6	4	2	0	15	5	+10	14	Promotion to Kakkonen
2	KäPa	5	4	0	1	14	4	+10	12	Promotion to Kakkonen
3	SexyPöxyt	6	4	0	2	11	4	+7	12	
4	HerTo	6	3	1	2	15	7	+8	10	
5	Atlantis II	5	3	1	1	14	6	+8	10	
6	Espoo II	6	3	1	2	8	8	0	10	
7	HPS	5	2	3	0	12	7	+5	9	
8	NuPS	6	2	3	1	14	15	−1	9	
9	CLE	6	3	0	3	9	11	−2	9	
10	Töölön Taisto	6	2	2	2	10	7	+3	8	
11	ToTe	5	2	2	1	7	9	−2	8	
12	Kirkkonummi	5	2	1	2	9	9	0	7	
13	LPS	5	1	2	2	15	16	−1	5	
14	Finnkurd	5	1	2	2	12	15	−3	5	
15	BK-46	5	0	3	2	4	12	−8	3	
16	Espoon Tikka	6	0	2	4	11	19	−8	2	Relegation to Nelonen
17	POHU	6	0	2	4	6	19	−13	2	Relegation to Nelonen
18	EIF II	6	0	1	5	5	18	−13	1	Relegation to Nelonen

Updated to match(es) played on 24 July 2020. Source: Soccerway
Rules for classification: 1) Points; 2) Goal difference; 3) Goals scored; 4) Head-to-head points; 5) Head-to-head goal difference; 6) Head-to-head goals scored; 7) Fewer away goals conceded; 8) Home goals scored; 9) Fewer home goals conceded; 10) Play-off; 11) Draw

=== Etelä B ===
Pos	Team	Pld	W	D	L	GF	GA	GD	Pts	Promotion or qualification
1	TiPS	5	5	0	0	23	6	+17	15	Promotion to Kakkonen
2	Futura	5	5	0	0	19	6	+13	15	Promotion to Kakkonen
3	VJS	6	4	1	1	20	8	+12	13	
4	SAPA III	5	4	1	0	12	3	+9	13	
5	Kontu	5	4	0	1	18	4	+14	12	
6	TuPS	5	3	1	1	15	7	+8	10	
7	Valtti	5	3	1	1	9	4	+5	10	
8	MPS / Atletico Malmi	5	2	1	2	15	11	+4	7	
9	Kuusysi	5	2	1	2	11	10	+1	7	
10	KoiPS	5	2	0	3	9	18	−9	6	
11	Ponnistajat	5	1	2	2	5	10	−5	5	
12	RiPS	5	0	4	1	5	9	−4	4	
13	NJS II	5	1	1	3	10	18	−8	4	
14	PKKU II	5	0	2	3	4	13	−9	2	
15	JoKi	6	0	2	4	6	20	−14	2	
16	PuiU Helsinki	5	0	1	4	5	13	−8	1	Relegation to Nelonen
17	Nastolan Nopsa	5	0	1	4	7	19	−12	1	Relegation to Nelonen
18	JäPS II	5	0	1	4	4	18	−14	1	Relegation to Nelonen

Updated to match(es) played on 23 July 2020. Source: Soccerway
Rules for classification: 1) Points; 2) Goal difference; 3) Goals scored; 4) Head-to-head points; 5) Head-to-head goal difference; 6) Head-to-head goals scored; 7) Fewer away goals conceded; 8) Home goals scored; 9) Fewer home goals conceded; 10) Play-off; 11) Draw

=== Itä B ===
Pos	Team	Pld	W	D	L	GF	GA	GD	Pts	Promotion or qualification
1	PeKa	6	5	0	1	29	9	+20	15	Promotion to Kakkonen
2	STPS	5	5	0	0	16	3	+13	15	
3	SavU	5	4	0	1	16	5	+11	12	
4	Edustus	6	3	1	2	13	11	+2	10	
5	Sudet	6	3	0	3	11	10	+1	9	
6	LaPa	6	2	3	1	8	11	−3	9	
7	Union Plaani	5	2	1	2	5	7	−2	7	
8	KyPa	6	1	1	4	7	16	−9	4	
9	Liry	6	1	1	4	5	15	−10	4	
10	HaPK	6	1	0	5	5	17	−12	3	
11	Ri-Pa	5	0	1	4	8	19	−11	1	Relegation to Nelonen

Updated to match(es) played on 22 July 2020. Source: Soccerway
Rules for classification: 1) Points; 2) Goal difference; 3) Goals scored; 4) Head-to-head points; 5) Head-to-head goal difference; 6) Head-to-head goals scored; 7) Fewer away goals conceded; 8) Home goals scored; 9) Fewer home goals conceded; 10) Play-off; 11) Draw

=== Keski-Pohjanmaa and Vaasa ===
Pos	Team	Pld	W	D	L	GF	GA	GD	Pts	Promotion or qualification
1	Kraft	5	5	0	0	17	6	+11	15	Promotion to Kakkonen
2	SIF	4	3	0	1	7	3	+4	9	
3	KPV Akatemia	3	3	0	0	5	1	+4	9	
4	Korsnäs	4	2	0	2	6	8	−2	6	
5	Nykarleby IK	4	1	1	2	6	9	−3	4	
6	FC Sääripotku	4	1	1	2	6	10	−4	4	
7	Norrvalla	3	1	0	2	7	5	+2	3	
8	VPV	3	1	0	2	5	5	0	3	
9	VPS II	4	1	0	3	6	8	−2	3	
10	KaIK	4	1	0	3	2	5	−3	3	
11	Sporting Kristina	4	0	2	2	4	11	−7	2	Relegation to Nelonen

Updated to match(es) played on 22 July 2020. Source: Soccerway
Rules for classification: 1) Points; 2) Goal difference; 3) Goals scored; 4) Head-to-head points; 5) Head-to-head goal difference; 6) Head-to-head goals scored; 7) Fewer away goals conceded; 8) Home goals scored; 9) Fewer home goals conceded; 10) Play-off; 11) Draw

=== Pohjois-Suomi ===
Pos	Team	Pld	W	D	L	GF	GA	GD	Pts	Promotion or qualification
1	OTP (C, P)	7	7	0	0	33	1	+32	21	Promotion to Kakkonen
2	TP-47	7	6	0	1	42	7	+35	18	
3	HauPa	6	4	0	2	21	8	+13	12	
4	Oulu II	6	4	0	2	16	11	+5	12	
5	RoPo	6	2	1	3	11	20	−9	7	
6	Roi United	7	1	2	4	15	28	−13	5	
7	KajHa	6	1	1	4	8	20	−12	4	
8	OuHu	6	1	0	5	7	27	−20	3	
9	SoPa	5	0	0	5	3	34	−31	0	

Updated to match(es) played on 22 July 2020. Source: Soccerway
Rules for classification: 1) Points; 2) Goal difference; 3) Goals scored; 4) Head-to-head points; 5) Head-to-head goal difference; 6) Head-to-head goals scored; 7) Fewer away goals conceded; 8) Home goals scored; 9) Fewer home goals conceded; 10) Play-off; 11) Draw
(C) Champions; (P) Promoted

=== Tampere ===
Pos	Team	Pld	W	D	L	GF	GA	GD	Pts	Promotion or qualification
1	Loiske	6	4	1	1	19	6	+13	13	Promotion to Kakkonen
2	I-Kissat	5	4	1	0	16	7	+9	13	
3	NoPS	5	4	1	0	10	3	+7	13	
4	PS-44	6	3	2	1	14	8	+6	11	
5	TPV II	6	3	1	2	9	7	+2	10	
6	JanPa	5	2	0	3	11	9	+2	6	
7	TP-T	6	2	0	4	7	14	−7	6	
8	Tervakosken Pato	6	2	0	4	5	17	−12	6	
9	ACE	5	1	2	2	9	9	0	5	
10	Tampere United	5	1	2	2	6	6	0	5	Relegation to Nelonen
11	TKT	6	1	1	4	2	13	−11	4	Relegation to Nelonen
12	Forssa	5	0	1	4	6	15	−9	1	Relegation to Nelonen

Updated to match(es) played on 23 July 2020. Source: Soccerway
Rules for classification: 1) Points; 2) Goal difference; 3) Goals scored; 4) Head-to-head points; 5) Head-to-head goal difference; 6) Head-to-head goals scored; 7) Fewer away goals conceded; 8) Home goals scored; 9) Fewer home goals conceded; 10) Play-off; 11) Draw

=== Länsi Suomi ===
Pos	Team	Pld	W	D	L	GF	GA	GD	Pts	Promotion or qualification
1	Peimari United	3	2	1	0	8	3	+5	7	Promotion to Kakkonen
2	ToVe	2	2	0	0	7	5	+2	6	
3	Wilpas	3	2	0	1	7	6	+1	6	
4	Inter Turku II	3	2	0	1	5	4	+1	6	
5	Åland	2	1	1	0	4	1	+3	4	
6	MaPS	2	1	1	0	4	3	+1	4	
7	TPK	3	1	1	1	4	5	−1	4	
8	ÅIFK	2	1	0	1	5	4	+1	3	
9	PaiHa	4	1	0	3	6	10	−4	3	
10	EuPa	2	0	2	0	4	4	0	2	
11	VG-62	3	0	1	2	3	5	−2	1	
12	TPS II	3	0	1	2	2	4	−2	1	
13	Wolves	2	0	0	2	0	5	−5	0	Relegation to Nelonen

Updated to match(es) played on 23 July 2020. Source: Soccerway
Rules for classification: 1) Points; 2) Goal difference; 3) Goals scored; 4) Head-to-head points; 5) Head-to-head goal difference; 6) Head-to-head goals scored; 7) Fewer away goals conceded; 8) Home goals scored; 9) Fewer home goals conceded; 10) Play-off; 11) Draw

== References and sources ==
- Finnish FA
- Kolmonen (jalkapallo) (in Finnish)
