= 2009 Kolmonen - Finnish League Division 3 =

Finnish League Division 3
- Season: 2009
- Champions: BK-46; AC Vantaa; City Stars; PEPO; SC Riverball; KajHa; FC Korsholm; MuSa; Koskenpojat; SoVo
- Promoted: 9 teams above
- Relegated: 15 teams

League tables for teams participating in Kolmonen, the fourth tier of the Finnish soccer league system, in 2009.

== 2009 League tables ==
=== Helsinki and Uusimaa ===
==== Section 1 ====
Pos	Team	Pld	W	D	L	GF	GA	GD	Pts	Promotion or relegation
1	BK-46	22	13	6	3	51	22	+29	45	Promoted
2	EBK	22	14	3	5	59	31	+28	45	
3	FC HIK	22	12	4	6	48	24	+24	40	
4	Ponnistus	22	11	5	6	35	28	+7	38	
5	NuPS	22	10	6	6	35	28	+7	36	
6	SAPA	22	9	6	7	38	28	+10	33	
7	VJS	22	8	6	8	39	34	+5	30	
8	PuiU	22	8	5	9	35	43	−8	29	
9	HPS	22	7	5	10	39	42	−3	26	
10	KyIF FCK1	22	7	4	11	32	44	−12	25	
11	HIFK/2	22	4	4	14	35	57	−22	16	Relegated
12	Kasiysi	22	0	4	18	12	77	−65	4	Relegated

==== Section 2 ====
Pos	Team	Pld	W	D	L	GF	GA	GD	Pts	Promotion or relegation
1	AC Vantaa	22	22	0	0	99	21	+78	66	Promoted
2	MPS	22	16	4	2	76	29	+47	52	
3	Pöxyt	22	15	4	3	69	26	+43	49	
4	EsPa	22	10	5	7	50	36	+14	35	
5	FC Espoo/2	22	8	4	10	41	47	−6	28	
6	FC Viikingit Ed/2	22	8	1	13	41	45	−4	25	
7	TuPS	22	7	4	11	38	58	−20	25	
8	FC Kontu	22	7	2	13	38	56	−18	23	
9	MaKu	22	7	2	13	35	58	−23	23	
10	NJS	22	6	4	12	31	60	−29	22	
11	FC Degis	22	5	5	12	42	56	−14	20	Relegated
12	Zyklon	22	3	1	18	27	95	−68	10	Relegated

==== Section 3 ====
Pos	Team	Pld	W	D	L	GF	GA	GD	Pts	Promotion or relegation
1	City Stars	22	17	1	4	47	17	+30	52	Promoted
2	SalReipas	22	15	5	2	59	21	+38	50	
3	JäPS	22	14	3	5	78	27	+51	45	
4	HerTo	22	9	6	7	38	37	+1	33	
5	Spartak	22	7	8	7	39	29	+10	29	
6	PK-35	22	7	8	7	37	37	0	29	
7	PPV	22	8	4	10	37	43	−6	28	
8	Allianssi Vantaa	22	7	4	11	38	47	−9	25	
9	OPedot	22	6	7	9	21	30	−9	25	
10	KOPSE	22	6	4	12	32	54	−22	22	
11	SUMU	22	5	3	14	18	54	−36	18	Relegated
12	Stars	22	3	3	16	17	65	−48	12	Relegated

=== South-East Finland (Kaakkois-Suomi) ===
Pos	Team	Pld	W	D	L	GF	GA	GD	Pts	Promotion or relegation
1	PEPO	20	17	2	1	51	12	+39	53	Promoted
2	MiKi	20	15	3	2	66	14	+52	48	
3	Sudet	20	11	4	5	53	23	+30	37	
4	SavU	20	10	5	5	46	23	+23	35	
5	STPS	20	10	3	7	63	43	+20	33	
6	HaPK	20	8	2	10	19	40	−21	26	
7	KoRe	20	7	4	9	25	36	−11	25	
8	SiU	20	4	5	11	19	39	−20	17	
9	VoPpK	20	5	1	14	17	57	−40	16	
10	TsV	20	4	3	13	21	56	−35	15	
11	Lappee JK	20	2	2	16	18	55	−37	8	Relegated

=== Central and Eastern Finland (Keski- and Itä-Suomi) ===
Pos	Team	Pld	W	D	L	GF	GA	GD	Pts	Promotion or relegation
1	SC Riverball	20	18	1	1	90	12	+78	55	Promoted
2	SC KuFu-98	20	13	3	4	65	26	+39	42	
3	FC Keitelejazz	20	12	5	3	61	26	+35	41	
4	JoPS	20	11	5	4	43	32	+11	38	
5	Zulimanit	20	10	2	8	50	43	+7	32	
6	JIPPO/2	20	7	3	10	34	42	−8	24	
7	JIlves	20	5	5	10	36	48	−12	20	
8	BET	20	6	2	12	33	81	−48	20	
9	Huima	20	4	6	10	31	51	−20	18	
10	JPS	20	5	3	12	29	52	−23	18	
11	ToU	20	0	3	17	21	80	−59	3	Relegated

=== Northern Finland (Pohjois-Suomi) ===
Pos	Team	Pld	W	D	L	GF	GA	GD	Pts	Promotion or relegation
1	KajHa	16	14	1	1	85	13	+72	43	Promoted
2	AC Kajaani	16	14	1	1	49	11	+38	43	
3	PS Kemi 2	16	8	2	6	44	34	+10	26	
4	FC Muurola	16	6	3	7	35	43	−8	21	
5	Tervarit	16	5	3	8	30	45	−15	18	
6	HauPa	16	4	4	8	17	41	−24	16	
7	OLS A	16	4	3	9	29	48	−19	15	
8	OuTa	16	3	4	9	25	31	−6	13	
9	OuJK	16	2	3	11	17	65	−48	9	Relegated

=== Central Ostrobothnia and Vaasa (Keski-Pohjanmaa and Vaasa) ===
Pos	Team	Pld	W	D	L	GF	GA	GD	Pts	Promotion or relegation
1	FC Korsholm	24	17	5	2	79	30	+49	56	Promoted
2	VPS-j	24	16	5	3	68	24	+44	53	
3	Öja-73	24	15	2	7	57	30	+27	47	
4	NIK	24	12	2	10	55	50	+5	38	
5	Sporting	24	10	6	8	49	43	+6	36	
6	Reima	24	10	4	10	47	38	+9	34	
7	Karhu	24	10	2	12	55	51	+4	32	
8	FC KOMU	24	9	5	10	47	49	−2	32	
9	TUS	24	7	9	8	35	40	−5	30	
10	IK	24	9	1	14	48	87	−39	28	
11	FC Kuffen	24	7	6	11	42	44	−2	27	Relegated
12	KP-V	24	7	4	13	47	67	−20	25	Relegated
13	FC YPA II	24	0	3	21	26	102	−76	3	Relegated

=== Satakunta ===
Pos	Team	Pld	W	D	L	GF	GA	GD	Pts	Promotion
1	MuSa	18	14	4	0	74	13	+61	46	Promoted
2	EuPa	18	10	3	5	61	25	+36	33	
3	PiTU	18	10	2	6	41	35	+6	32	
4	FC Rauma	18	8	6	4	48	23	+25	30	
5	P-Iirot Reservi	18	9	3	6	42	32	+10	30	
6	TOVE	18	7	4	7	39	41	−2	25	
7	RuosV	18	6	6	6	48	38	+10	24	
8	FC Jazz-J2	18	7	3	8	41	39	+2	24	
9	Nasta	18	1	2	15	24	105	−81	5	
10	FC Ulvila	18	1	1	16	21	88	−67	4	

=== Tampere ===
Pos	Team	Pld	W	D	L	GF	GA	GD	Pts	Relegation
1	Koskenpojat	22	19	0	3	76	18	+58	57	
2	Härmä	22	12	5	5	50	35	+15	41	
3	I-Kissat	22	13	2	7	52	38	+14	41	
4	TP-49	22	11	2	9	39	52	−13	35	
5	NoPS	22	10	4	8	44	38	+6	34	
6	FJK	22	9	5	8	54	42	+12	32	
7	FC Tigers	22	9	5	8	44	35	+9	32	
8	PS-44	22	9	4	9	39	41	−2	31	
9	Pato	22	6	9	7	36	39	−3	27	
10	TKT	22	6	5	11	39	43	−4	23	
11	KaVo	22	4	2	16	31	70	−39	14	Relegated
12	Loiske	22	1	3	18	23	76	−53	6	Relegated

=== Turku and Åland (Turku and Ahvenanmaa) ===
Pos	Team	Pld	W	D	L	GF	GA	GD	Pts	Promotion or relegation
1	SoVo	22	16	3	3	57	20	+37	51	Promoted
2	TuTo	22	13	5	4	52	28	+24	44	
3	Masku	22	11	6	5	44	23	+21	39	
4	TPK	22	9	5	8	42	34	+8	32	
5	SIFFK	22	9	3	10	41	41	0	30	
6	JyTy	22	9	3	10	41	53	−12	30	
7	Wilpas	22	8	5	9	27	32	−5	29	
8	Lieto	22	8	4	10	35	30	+5	28	
9	FC Boda	22	8	4	10	28	40	−12	28	
10	LTU	22	6	4	12	29	44	−15	22	
11	PIF	22	6	4	12	27	52	−25	22	
12	KaaPo 2	22	4	4	14	30	56	−26	16	Relegated

== References and sources ==
- Finnish FA
- ResultCode
- Kolmonen (jalkapallo) (in Finnish)
