= 2017 Kakkonen =

Kakkonen
- Season: 2017
- Promoted: AC Kajaani; Klubi 04
- Relegated: Sudet; Kultsu FC; FC Lahti Akatemia; Peimari United; NuPS; EsPa; KajHa; Villiketut; OTP

A total of 36 teams contested the league divided into three groups, Lohko A (Group A), Lohko B (Group B) and Lohko C (Group C). 25 returning from the 2016 season, two relegated from Ykkönen and nine promoted from Kolmonen. The champion of each group and the best runner-up will qualify to promotion matches to decide which two teams get promoted to the Ykkönen. The bottom three teams in each group will qualify directly for relegation to Kolmonen. Each team will play a total of 22 matches, playing twice against each team of its group.

KTP and FC Jazz were relegated from the 2016 Ykkönen, while FC Honka and IF Gnistan were promoted to the 2017 Ykkönen.

== Groups ==
Location of the 2017 Kakkonen teams. Lohko A (Group A) are red dots, Lohko B (Group B) are blue dots while Lohko C (Group C) are green dots.

=== Lohko A (Group A) ===
No.	Abbreviated Name	Town or Settlement	Official Club and Team Name	Movements from 2016
1.	Kiffen	Helsinki	Kronohagens Idrottsförening	
2.	FC Lahti Akatemia	Lahti	FC Kuusysi	
3.	FC Legirus Inter	Vantaa	FC Legirus Inter	
4.	JäPS	Järvenpää	Järvenpään Palloseura	
5.	Klubi 04	Helsinki	Klubi 04	
6.	KTP	Kotka	Kotkan Työväen Palloilijat	Relegated from 2016 Ykkönen
7.	Kultsu FC	Lappeenranta	Kultsu FC	
8.	MiPK	Mikkeli	Mikkelin Pallo-Kissat	
9.	MP	Mikkeli	Mikkelin Palloilijat	
10.	PEPO	Lappeenranta	PEPO Lappeenranta	
11.	PKKU	Järvenpää, Kerava and Tuusula	Pallokerho Keski-Uusimaa	
12.	Sudet	Kouvola	Sudet	

=== Lohko B (Group B) ===
No.	Abbreviated Name	Town or Settlement	Official Club and Team Name	Movements from 2016
1.	BK-46	Karis	Bollklubben-46	
2.	EsPa	Espoo	Etelä-Espoon Pallo	
3.	FC Espoo	Espoo	FC Espoo	
4.	FC Jazz	Pori	FC Jazz	Relegated from 2016 Ykkönen
5.	KäPa	Helsinki	Käpylän Pallo	
6.	MuSa	Pori	Musan Salama	
7.	NuPS	Vihti	Nummelan Palloseura	
8.	Peimari United	Paimio	Paimion KHT Soikka	
9.	SalPa	Salo	Salon Palloilijat	
10.	Tampere United	Tampere	Tampere United	
11.	TPV	Tampere	Tampereen Pallo-Veikot	
12.	FC Viikingit	Vuosaari	FC Viikingit	

=== Lohko C (Group C) ===
No.	Abbreviated Name	Town or Settlement	Official Club and Team Name	Movements from 2016
1.	GBK	Kokkola	Gamlakarleby Bollklubb	
2.	JBK	Jakobstad	Jakobstads BK	
3.	Hercules	Oulu	Jalkapalloseura Hercules	
4.	Kajaani	Kajaani	AC Kajaani	
5.	KajHa	Kajaani	Kajaanin Haka	
6.	Kraft	Närpes	Närpes Kraft Fotbollsförening	
7.	KuFu-98	Kuopio	SC Kuopio Futis-98	
8.	OTP	Oulu	Oulun Työväen Palloilijat	
9.	PK-37	Iisalmi	Pallo-Kerho 37	
10.	TP-47	Tornio	Tornion Pallo -47	
11.	VIFK	Vaasa	Idrottsföreningen Kamraterna Vasa	
12.	FC Villiketut	Jyväskylä	FC Villiketut	Promoted from 2016 Kolmonen

== League tables ==
=== Lohko A (Group A) ===
Pos	Team	Pld	W	D	L	GF	GA	GD	Pts	Qualification or relegation
1	KTP	22	14	6	2	55	16	+39	48	Qualification to Promotion playoffs
2	Klubi 04 (P)	22	12	8	2	60	19	+41	44	Qualification to Promotion playoffs
3	PEPO	22	14	2	6	43	37	+6	44	
4	Legirus Inter	22	10	2	10	42	49	−7	32	
5	JäPS	22	9	4	9	35	28	+7	31	
6	Mikkelin Kissat	22	8	5	9	35	44	−9	29	
7	PK Keski-Uusimaa	22	8	5	9	29	39	−10	29	
8	FC Kiffen	22	7	5	10	28	32	−4	26	
9	MP	22	7	4	11	30	38	−8	25	
10	Sudet (R)	22	7	4	11	28	40	−12	25	Relegation to Kolmonen
11	Kultsu FC (R)	22	7	3	12	20	43	−23	24	Relegation to Kolmonen
12	FC Lahti Akatemia (R)	22	4	2	16	29	49	−20	14	Relegation to Kolmonen

Rules for classification: 1) points; 2) goal difference; 3) number of goals scored.
(P) Promoted; (R) Relegated

=== Lohko B (Group B) ===
Pos	Team	Pld	W	D	L	GF	GA	GD	Pts	Qualification or relegation
1	FC Viikingit	22	13	6	3	50	28	+22	45	Qualification to Promotion playoffs
2	MuSa	22	14	2	6	44	18	+26	44	
3	SalPa	22	13	4	5	47	31	+16	43	
4	BK-46	22	13	3	6	46	29	+17	42	
5	TPV	22	11	3	8	45	40	+5	36	
6	Tampere United	22	9	6	7	43	38	+5	33	
7	KäPa	22	8	8	6	34	20	+14	32	
8	FC Jazz	22	8	4	10	37	43	−6	28	
9	FC Espoo	22	7	4	11	39	37	+2	25	
10	Peimari United (R)	22	5	4	13	26	43	−17	19	Relegation to Kolmonen
11	Nummelan Palloseura (R)	22	4	2	16	24	66	−42	14	Relegation to Kolmonen
12	EsPa (R)	22	3	2	17	28	70	−42	11	Relegation to Kolmonen

Rules for classification: 1) points; 2) goal difference; 3) number of goals scored.
(R) Relegated

=== Lohko C (Group C) ===
Pos	Team	Pld	W	D	L	GF	GA	GD	Pts	Qualification or relegation
1	AC Kajaani (P)	22	16	2	4	63	20	+43	50	Qualification to Promotion playoffs
2	GBK	22	14	4	4	47	23	+24	46	
3	VIFK	22	11	6	5	41	32	+9	39	
4	Närpes Kraft	22	10	4	8	48	41	+7	34	
5	Hercules	22	10	3	9	49	41	+8	33	
6	TP-47	22	8	6	8	39	37	+2	30	
7	JBK	22	8	4	10	38	39	−1	28	
8	PK-37	22	6	8	8	28	40	−12	26	
9	KuFu-98	22	6	7	9	32	30	+2	25	
10	KajHa (R)	22	6	5	11	23	37	−14	23	Relegation to Kolmonen
11	Villiketut (R)	22	6	3	13	28	63	−35	21	Relegation to Kolmonen
12	OTP (R)	22	3	4	15	20	53	−33	13	Relegation to Kolmonen

Rules for classification: 1) points; 2) goal difference; 3) number of goals scored.
(P) Promoted; (R) Relegated

=== Runner-up teams ===
At the end of the season, a comparison is made between the runners-up. The best runner-up will qualify to promotion matches.

Pos	Grp	Team	Pld	W	D	L	GF	GA	GD	Pts	Qualification
1	A	Klubi 04	22	12	8	2	60	19	+41	44	Qualification to Promotion playoffs
2	B	MuSa	22	14	2	6	44	18	+26	44	
3	C	GBK	22	14	4	4	47	23	+24	46	

Rules for classification: 1) points; 2) goal difference; 3) number of goals scored.

=== Promotion play-offs ===
Group winners and the best runner-up will play two-legged ties. Team pairs will be drawn and the two winning teams will be promoted to the Ykkönen for season 2017.

Group winners

- Lohko A (Group A): KTP
- Lohko B (Group B): FC Viikingit
- Lohko C (Group C): AC Kajaani

The best runner-up
Klubi 04

==== First leg ====
7 October 2017
10:00

KTP	1–3	AC Kajaani
Tarvonen 12'	Report	Pasi 19' (o.g.); Ibiyomi 45', 60'

Arto Tolsa Areena, Kotka

14 October 2017
19:00

FC Viikingit	1–5	Klubi 04
Emeka 45'	Report	Minkenen 10'; Vertainen 23'; Jantti 33'; Minkenen 35'; Mensah 54'

Vuosaaren Urheilukenttä, Helsinki

==== Second leg ====
14 October 2017
19:00

AC Kajaani	3–2	KTP
Stephanus 16'; Ramirez 34'; Chigozie Ewelike 79'	Report	Tarvonen 49'; Nykanen 85'

Kajaanin liikuntapuisto, Kajaani

AC Kajaani won 6–3 on aggregate.

21 October 2017
12:00

Klubi 04	4–0	FC Viikingit
Vertainen 21'; Banza 33'; Minkenen 40', 69'	Report

Telia 5G -areena
Referee: O. Hämäläinen

Klubi 04 won 9–1 on aggregate.
