= Antti Mäkijärvi =

Finnish footballer (born 1993)

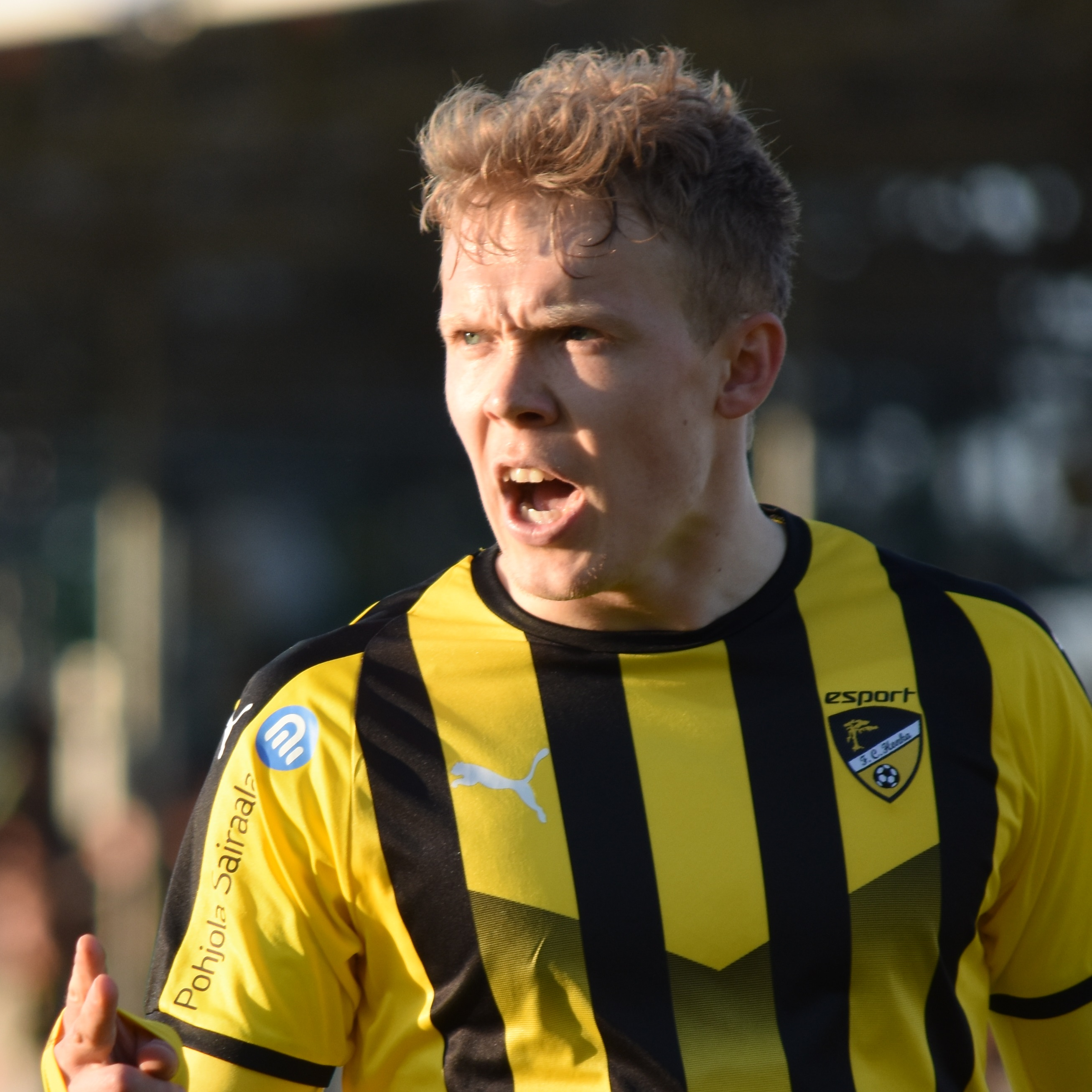

Personal information
- Date of birth: 8 December 1993 (age 32)
- Place of birth: Espoo, Finland
- Height: 1.79 m (5 ft 10 1/2 in)
- Position: Midfielder

Youth career
- 1998–2011: Honka

Senior career*
Years	Team	Apps	(Gls)
2009–2011	Pallohonka	43	(11)
2011–2014	Honka	92	(10)
2015	Ilves	17	(2)
2015–2017	Oldenburg	16	(1)
2018–2019	Honka	18	(0)
2019–2022	KTP	94	(23)

International career
2008	Finland U15	3	(0)
2009	Finland U16	11	(3)
2010	Finland U17	4	(1)
2010–2011	Finland U18	12	(0)
2012	Finland U20	2	(2)
2012–2013	Finland U21	8	(0)
Medal record
Honka
First place	Finnish League Cup	2011
First place	Finnish Cup	2012
Second place	Veikkausliiga	2013
Oldenburg
Second place	Regionalliga Nord	2016
- * Club domestic league appearances and goals as of 8 October 2022

Antti Mäkijärvi (born 8 December 1993) is a Finnish former professional football midfielder. Previously, he played in German Regionalliga Nord side VfB Oldenburg. Mäkijärvi was born in Espoo, Finland. He began his senior club career playing for Pallohonka, before making his league debut for Honka at age 17 in 2011. After winning his first trophy, the Finnish League Cup, during his first season on league level, he helped Honka win the 2012 Cup.

== Club career ==
=== Honka ===
Mäkijärvi started his Veikkausliiga career in local team FC Honka in 2011.

=== Ilves ===
On 14 April 2015, Mäkijärvi signed for FC Ilves on a one-year contract.

=== Oldenburg ===
On 10 August 2015 it was announced that Mäkijärvi had signed a contract with VfB Oldenburg.

=== Return to Honka ===
On 1 April 2018, Mäkijärvi signed a 1+1 year contract with Honka.

== International career ==
Mäkijärvi has 40 caps for Finland national youth teams. He made his debut in the UEFA European Under-21 Championship qualifications in Raatti Stadium, Oulu on 11 June 2013 in a match against Lithuania.

== Career statistics ==
=== Club ===
As of 11 June 2024

Appearances and goals by club, season and competition
Club	Season	League			Cup		Continental		Total	
Club	Season	Division	Apps	Goals	Apps	Goals	Apps	Goals	Apps	Goals
Pallohonka	2009	Kakkonen	9	1	0	0	—		9	1
Pallohonka	2010	Kakkonen	24	5	0	0	—		24	5
Pallohonka	2011	Kakkonen	10	5	0	0	—		10	5
Pallohonka	Total		43	11	0	0	—		43	11
Honka	2011	Veikkausliiga	10	0	2	0	1 (Note: Appearances in the Europa League)	0	13	0
Honka	2012	Veikkausliiga	28	5	3	1	—		31	4
Honka	2013	Veikkausliiga	31	2	8	2	2	0	41	4
Honka	2014	Veikkausliiga	23	3	4	0	2	0	29	3
Honka	Total		92	10	17	3	5	0	114	13
Ilves	2015	Veikkausliiga	17	2	1	0	—		19	2
Oldenburg	2015–16	Regionalliga Nord	13	1	0	0	—		13	1
Oldenburg	2016–17	Regionalliga Nord	0	0	0	0	—		0	0
Oldenburg	2017–18	Regionalliga Nord	3	0	0	0	—		3	0
Oldenburg	Total		16	1	0	0	—		16	1
Honka	2018	Veikkausliiga	18	3	0	0	—		18	3
KTP	2019	Ykkönen	26	5	2	0	—		15	2
KTP	2020	Ykkönen	20	9	5	2	–		25	11
KTP	2021	Veikkausliiga	22	4	3	0	–		25	4
KTP	2022	Ykkönen	26	5	2	0	–		28	5
KTP	Total		94	23	12	2	0	0	106	25
Career total			278	50	30	4	5	0	313	54

== Honours and achievements ==
=== Club ===
Honka

- Finnish League Cup: 2011
- Finnish Cup: 2012
