= Ilari Äijälä =

Finnish footballer (born 1986)

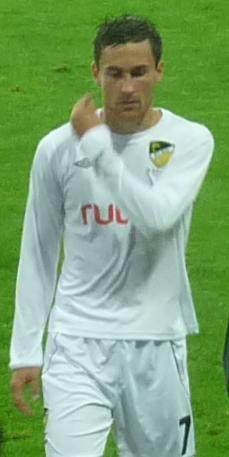

Personal information
- Date of birth: 30 September 1986 (age 40)
- Place of birth: Helsinki, Finland
- Height: 1.82 m (5 ft 11 1/2 in)
- Positions: Defender; midfielder

Youth career
- MPS
- HJK

Senior career*
Years	Team	Apps	(Gls)
2004–2005	Klubi-04	35	(9)
2005–2007	HJK	22	(1)
2006	→ Klubi-04	11	(5)
2007	→ FC KooTeePee (loan)	6	(1)
2008–2010	MYPA	71	(17)
2011–2014	FC Honka	96	(9)
2015	KTP	31	(6)
2016	PK-35	20	(2)
2016–2018	FC Honka	21	(3)

International career
	Finland U21	1	(0)
2012	Finland	1	(0)
Medal record
HJK Helsinki
Runner-up	Veikkausliiga	2005
Winner	Finnish Cup	2006
Runner-up	Veikkausliiga	2006
Honka
Winner	Finnish League Cup	2011
Winner	Finnish Cup	2012
- * Club domestic league appearances and goals as of 13 May 2017 (UTC)

Ilari Äijälä (born 30 September 1986) is a Finnish retired football player who last played for FC Honka.

Äijälä finished up as the League Cup's top-scorer in 2011 together with Ilja Venäläinen.

He made his debut for the Finland national team in 2012 against Trinidad and Tobago.
