= 2011 Kakkonen – Finnish League Division 2 =

Finnish League Division 2
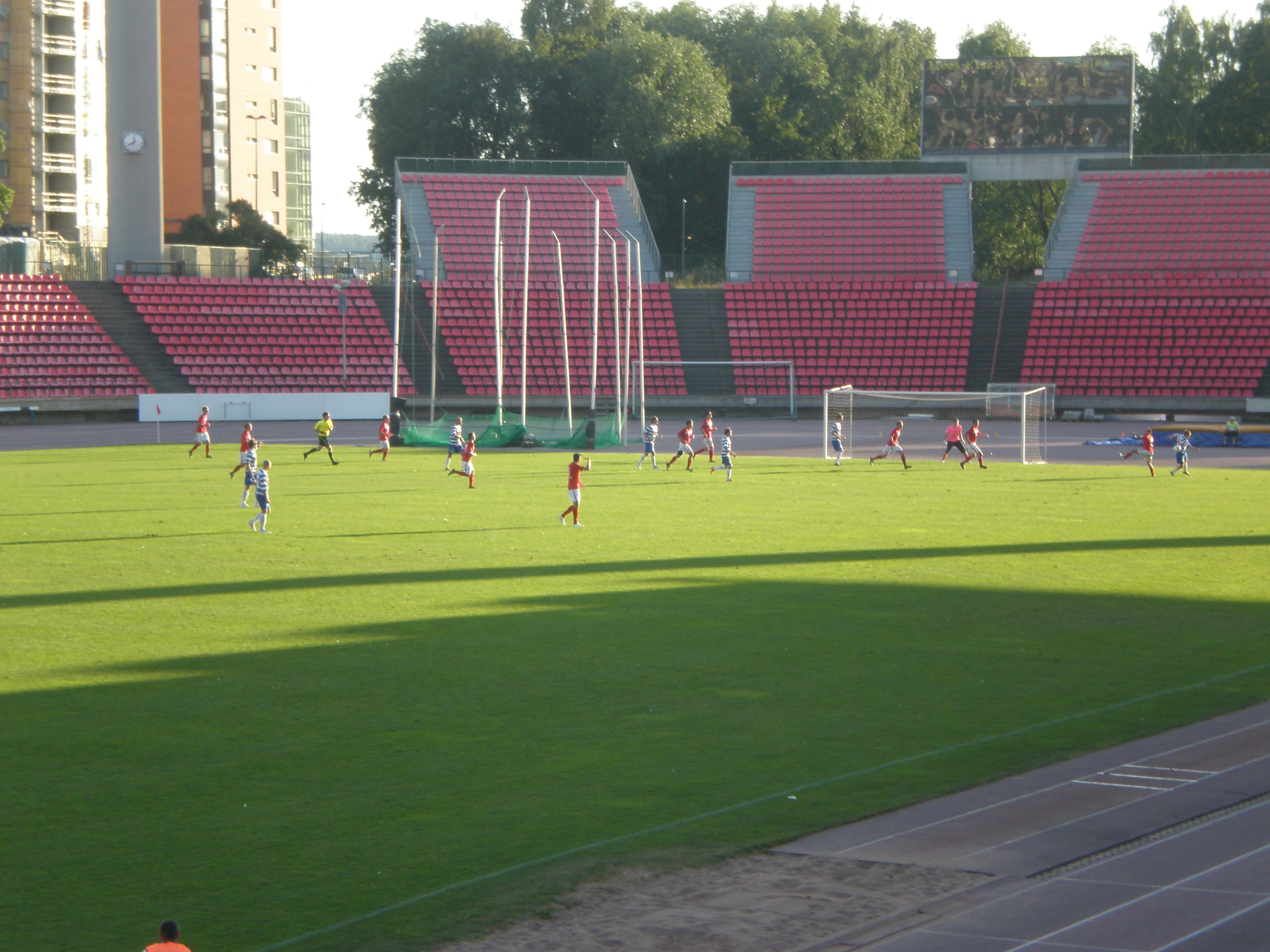
- Kakkonen game Ilves-Kissat vs. SalPa at Ratina Stadion
- Season: 2011
- Champions: Klubi-04; BK-46; SJK
- Promoted: SJK
- Relegated: 10 teams

League tables for teams participating in Kakkonen, the third tier of the Finnish soccer league system, in 2011.

== League tables ==
=== Group A ===
Pos	Team	Pld	W	D	L	GF	GA	GD	Pts	Qualification or relegation
1	Klubi-04	26	19	3	4	96	33	+63	60	Qualification to Promotion playoffs
2	IF Gnistan	26	16	2	8	67	42	+25	50	
3	Mikkelin Palloilijat	26	14	7	5	61	33	+28	49	
4	GrIFK	26	13	4	9	41	38	+3	43	
5	Pallohonka	26	12	5	9	47	44	+3	41	
6	FC Kuusysi	26	12	3	11	62	52	+10	39	
7	FC Futura	26	10	7	9	51	52	−1	37	
8	Atlantis FC	26	10	6	10	50	47	+3	36	
9	Kiffen, Helsinki	26	8	9	9	28	40	−12	33	
10	LPS	26	9	5	12	44	56	−12	32	
11	KTP	26	9	5	12	33	49	−16	32	
12	Sudet (R)	26	8	5	13	32	48	−16	29	Relegation to Kolmonen
13	MPS (R)	26	5	3	18	41	75	−34	18	Relegation to Kolmonen
14	KäPa (R)	26	4	2	20	30	74	−44	14	Relegation to Kolmonen

(R) Relegated

=== Group B ===
Pos	Team	Pld	W	D	L	GF	GA	GD	Pts	Qualification or relegation
1	BK-46	26	17	9	0	59	18	+41	60	Qualification to Promotion playoffs
2	Ilves	26	18	2	6	69	32	+37	56	
3	Pallo-Iirot	26	15	7	4	57	30	+27	52	
4	Närpes Kraft	26	14	5	7	64	37	+27	47	
5	SalPa	26	12	8	6	55	28	+27	44	
6	JäPS	26	11	8	7	70	41	+29	41	
7	FC Jazz	26	12	5	9	55	38	+17	41	
8	ÅIFK	26	13	2	11	56	51	+5	41	
9	TPV	26	12	4	10	52	49	+3	40	
10	LoPa	26	10	3	13	41	56	−15	33	
11	Ilves-Kissat (R)	26	5	4	17	22	65	−43	19	Relegation to Kolmonen
12	TuTo (R)	26	5	2	19	24	65	−41	17	Relegation to Kolmonen
13	MuSa (R)	26	4	3	19	20	71	−51	15	Relegation to Kolmonen
14	TiPS (R)	26	2	2	22	23	83	−60	8	Relegation to Kolmonen

(R) Relegated

=== Group C ===
Pos	Team	Pld	W	D	L	GF	GA	GD	Pts	Qualification or relegation
1	SJK (P)	26	22	4	0	72	14	+58	70	Qualification to Promotion playoffs
2	GBK	26	15	4	7	51	35	+16	49	
3	TP-47	26	12	6	8	46	30	+16	42	
4	FC YPA	26	12	5	9	46	30	+16	41	
5	VIFK	26	12	4	10	37	34	+3	40	
6	FC Kiisto	26	12	2	12	33	37	−4	38	
7	ViPa	26	11	4	11	46	37	+9	37	
8	PK-37	26	11	4	11	44	42	+2	37	
9	HauPa	26	10	5	11	27	41	−14	35	
10	Warkaus JK	26	10	3	13	39	48	−9	33	
11	FC Santa Claus	26	8	8	10	47	44	+3	32	
12	JBK (R)	26	9	5	12	39	47	−8	32	Relegation to Kolmonen
13	FCV (R)	26	3	6	17	35	73	−38	15	Relegation to Kolmonen
14	SC Riverball (R)	26	2	6	18	15	62	−47	12	Relegation to Kolmonen

(P) Promoted; (R) Relegated

== Promotion playoffs ==
Qualifying

- BK-46 – Klubi 04 0 – 0
- Klubi 04 – BK-46 0 – 1

BK-46 qualify for final 1 – 0

- Ilves – SJK 1 – 2
- SJK – Ilves 2 – 0

SJK qualify for final 4 – 1

Final

- SJK – BK-46 3 – 0
- BK-46 – SJK 1 – 2

SJK promoted 5 – 1 on aggregate

== References and sources ==
- Finnish FA (Suomen Palloliitto - Kakkonen 2011)
