= Juuso Simpanen =

Finnish runner and former footballer (born 1991)

Personal information
- Date of birth: 8 June 1991 (age 35)
- Place of birth: Vantaa, Finland
- Height: 1.72 m (5 ft 7 1/2 in)
- Position: Midfielder

Team information
- Current team: SJK
- Number: 16

Youth career
- TiPS
- FC Honka

Senior career*
Years	Team	Apps	(Gls)
2010–2012	FC Honka	65	(2)
2013−	SJK		

International career^{‡}
- Finland U-17
2009–2010	Finland U-19	3	(0)
2010−	Finland U-21	6	(1)
Medal record
Honka
Winner	Finnish League Cup	2010
Winner	Finnish League Cup	2011
Winner	Finnish Cup	2012
- * Club domestic league appearances and goals as of 2 May 2013 ‡ National team caps and goals as of 15 April 2012

Juuso Simpanen (born 8 June 1991) is a Finnish ultra runner and former footballer. He has played for Finnish Ykkönen club Seinäjoen Jalkapallokerho.

After starting his career with local TiPS, young Simpanen moved to neighbours FC Honka, where he finished his football grooming and raised to the first team squad in 2010. Simpanen was part of the team that won the Finnish League Cup in the same year. He was awarded as man of the match in the final against JJK.

Since 2021, Simpanen has had success in ultra trail running, winning races such as NUTS Karhunkierros and Kullamannen.
