= Kevin Mombilo =

Finnish footballer (born 1993)

Personal information
- Date of birth: 6 May 1993 (age 33)
- Place of birth: Zaire
- Height: 1.75 m (5 ft 9 in)
- Position: Right winger

Team information
- Current team: Suurmetsän Urheilijat/sob

Youth career
- FC Kontu
- PK-35
- KäPa
- HJK

Senior career*
Years	Team	Apps	(Gls)
2010–2011	Klubi-04	26	(5)
2012–2014	FC Honka	39	(2)
2012	→ Pallohonka (loan)	10	(4)
2015	FC Jazz	19	(3)
2016–2017	PK-35	21	(2)
2017	Inter Turku	7	(0)
2018	PS Kemi	18	(1)
2019	Partizani Tirana	0	(0)
2022–	Suurmetsän Urheilijat/sob		

International career
	Finland U-15	11	(2)
	Finland U-16	8	(0)
	Finland U-17	4	(1)
Medal record
Honka
Winner	Finnish Cup	2012
- * Club domestic league appearances and goals as of 23:31, 14 May 2019 (UTC)

Kevin Mombilo (born 6 May 1993) is a Finnish professional footballer who plays as a right winger for amateur club Suurmetsän Urheilijat/sob. He is of Congolese descent.
