= Littoisten Työväen Urheilijat =

Finnish sports club

- Full name: Littoisten Työväen Urheilijat
- Nickname: Litu tai LTU (Äl Tee Uu)
- Founded: 1932
- Ground: Littoisten kenttä, Littoinen, Finland
- Chairman: Esko Koivisto
- Manager: Aki Tetri
- League: Kolmonen
Home colours	Away colours

Littoisten Työväen Urheilijat (abbreviated as LTU) is sports club from Littoinen, Finland. The club was founded in 1932 and currently has five main sections covering football, volleyball, skiing, Women's Division and Veterans' Division. Football and volleyball are now the most popular sports in the club and keep-fit is another important activity that is organised. In total LTU has over 750 members.

== Football ==
The club runs a number of teams including 3 men's teams, a veteran's team (Old Boys) and 3 junior teams. The club's home ground is at the Littoisten kenttä.

== 2010 season ==
LTU Men's Team are competing in the Kolmonen administered by the Turku SPL. This is the fourth highest tier in the Finnish football system. In 2009 LTU finished in tenth position in their Kolmonen section.

LTU2 are participating in Upper Section – Summer (Kevät Ylälohko) of the Vitonen administered by the Turku SPL.

LTU3 are participating in Section 1 (Lohko 1) of the Kutonen administered by the Turku SPL.

== References and sources ==
- Official LTU Club Website
- Official LTU Football Website
- Finnish Wikipedia
- Suomen Cup
- Littoisten Työväen Urheilijat Facebook
