= Pietari Holopainen =

Finnish footballer (born 1982)

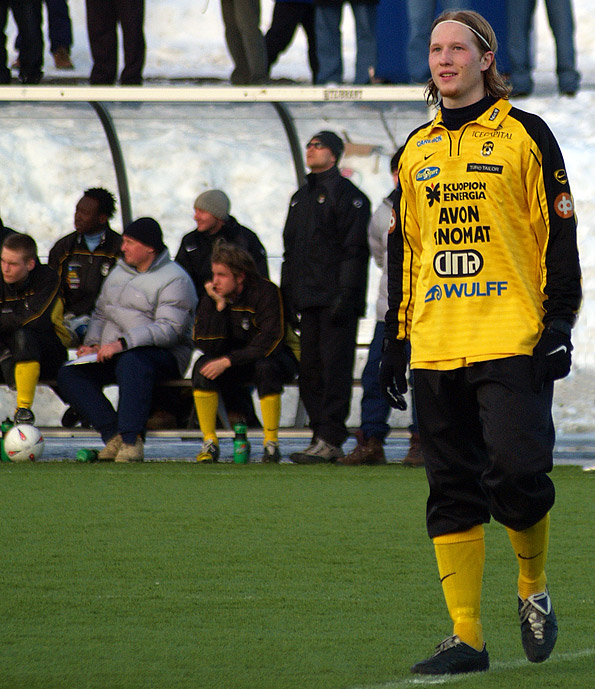

Personal information
- Date of birth: 26 September 1982 (age 44)
- Place of birth: Finland
- Height: 1.83 m (6 ft 0 in)
- Position: Defender

Youth career
- –2000: KuPS

Senior career*
Years	Team	Apps	(Gls)
2001–2005	KuPS	69	(6)
2006	MP	14	(0)
2007–2009	FC Haka	63	(7)
2010	KuPS	62	(11)
- * Club domestic league appearances and goals as of 13 September 2010

Pietari Holopainen (born 26 September 1982) is a Finnish former professional footballer who played as a defender.
