= Ville Oksanen =

Finnish footballer (born 1987)

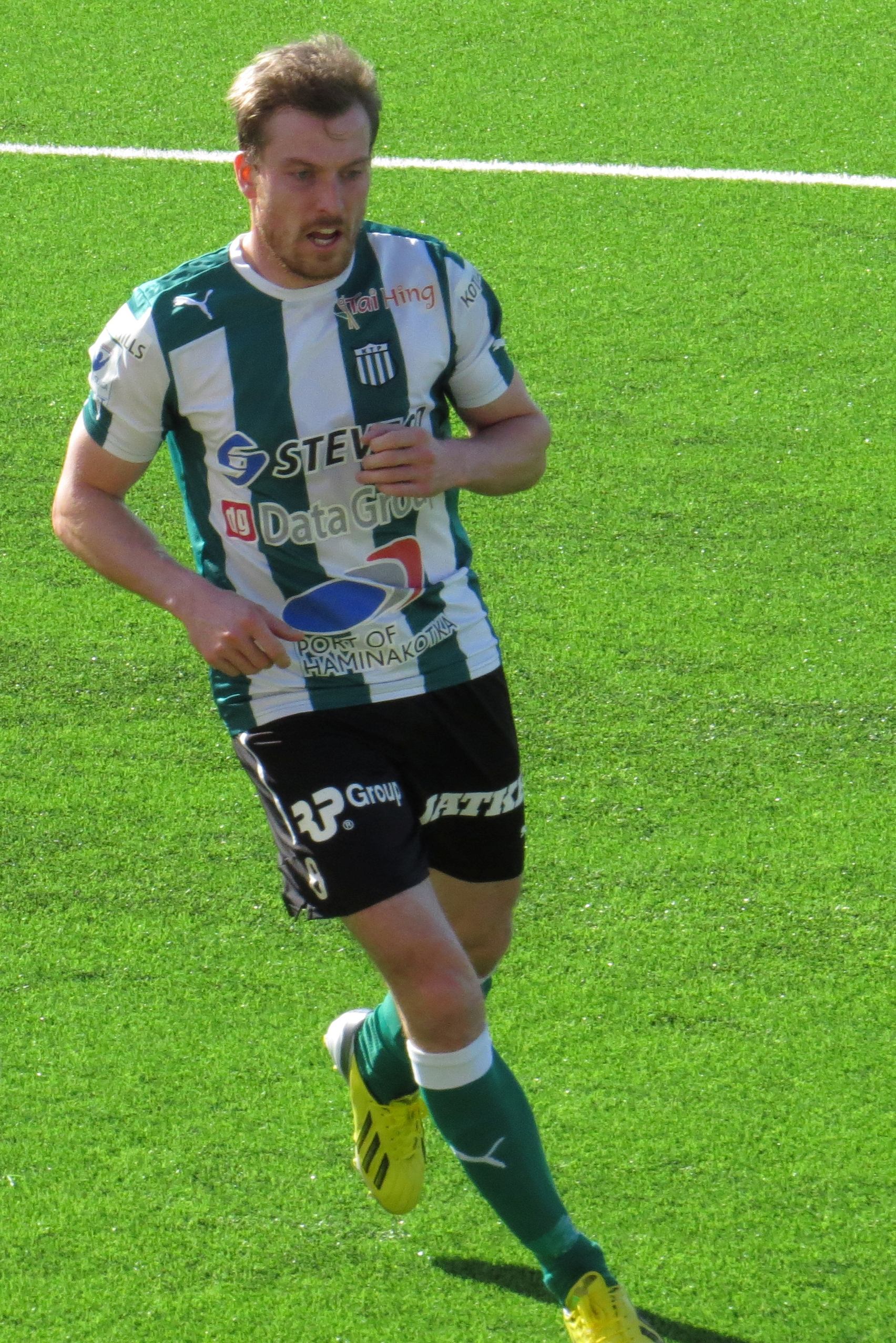
- Ville Oksanen playing for KTP in 2015.

Personal information
- Date of birth: 25 February 1987 (age 39)
- Place of birth: Anjalankoski, Finland
- Height: 1.78 m (5 ft 10 in)
- Position: Midfielder

Youth career
- 1998–2000: MyPa
- 2001–2005: FC Kuusysi

Senior career*
Years	Team	Apps	(Gls)
2006–2007	MyPa	5	(0)
2007	→ JIPPO (loan)	2	(0)
2007	→ MP (loan)	17	(2)
2008	FC KooTeePee	24	(0)
2009–2012	MyPa	106	(12)
2013–2018	KTP	116	(15)
- * Club domestic league appearances and goals

Ville Oksanen (born 25 February 1987) is a Finnish retired footballer.
