= Allianssi Vantaa =

Finnish football club

- Full name: Allianssi Vantaa
- Nickname(s): Allianssi
- Founded: 2006
- Ground: Tikkurilan urheilupuisto, Vantaa
- Capacity: 2000
- Chairman: Kaj Wiander
- Manager: Kaj Wiander
- Coach: Tom Weckström
- League: Kolmonen
Home colours	Away colours

Allianssi Vantaa is a football club based in the city of Vantaa, Finland. It is not the same club as the former Finnish football club, AC Allianssi.

Allianssi Vantaa was founded in 2006 and they currently play in the third division of Finnish football, Kolmonen. The club has a total of almost 3000 youth players at Korson Palloseura, Koivukylän Palloseura and Tikkurilan Palloseura, which are clubs that are loosely affiliated with Allianssi. Kaj Wiander is the chairman of the club.

The club's current homeground is Tikkurilan urheilupuisto in Tikkurila.

== Season to season ==
Season	Level	Division	Section	Administration	Position	Movements
2007	Tier 4	Kolmonen (Third Division)	Section 1	Helsinki & Uusimaa (SPL Uusimaa)	4th	
2008	Tier 4	Kolmonen (Third Division)	Section 2	Helsinki & Uusimaa (SPL Uusimaa)	10th	
2009	Tier 4	Kolmonen (Third Division)	Section 3	Helsinki & Uusimaa (SPL Uusimaa)	8th	
2010	Tier 4	Kolmonen (Third Division)	Section 2	Helsinki & Uusimaa (SPL Uusimaa)	6th	
2011	Tier 4	Kolmonen (Third Division)	Section 2	Helsinki & Uusimaa (SPL Uusimaa)	12th	Relegated
2012	Tier 5	Nelonen (Fourth Division)	Section 2	Uusimaa (SPL Uusimaa)	1st	Promoted

- 5 seasons in Kolmonen
- 1 season in Nelonen

== 2013 season ==
Allianssi are competing in Section 2 (Lohko 2) of the Kolmonen administered by the Helsinki SPL and Uusimaa SPL. This is the fourth highest tier in the Finnish football system. In 2012 Allianssi finished first in Nelonen (Section 2) and gained promotion back to Kolmonen after being relegated 2011.

== Allianssi Vantaa T98 girls ==
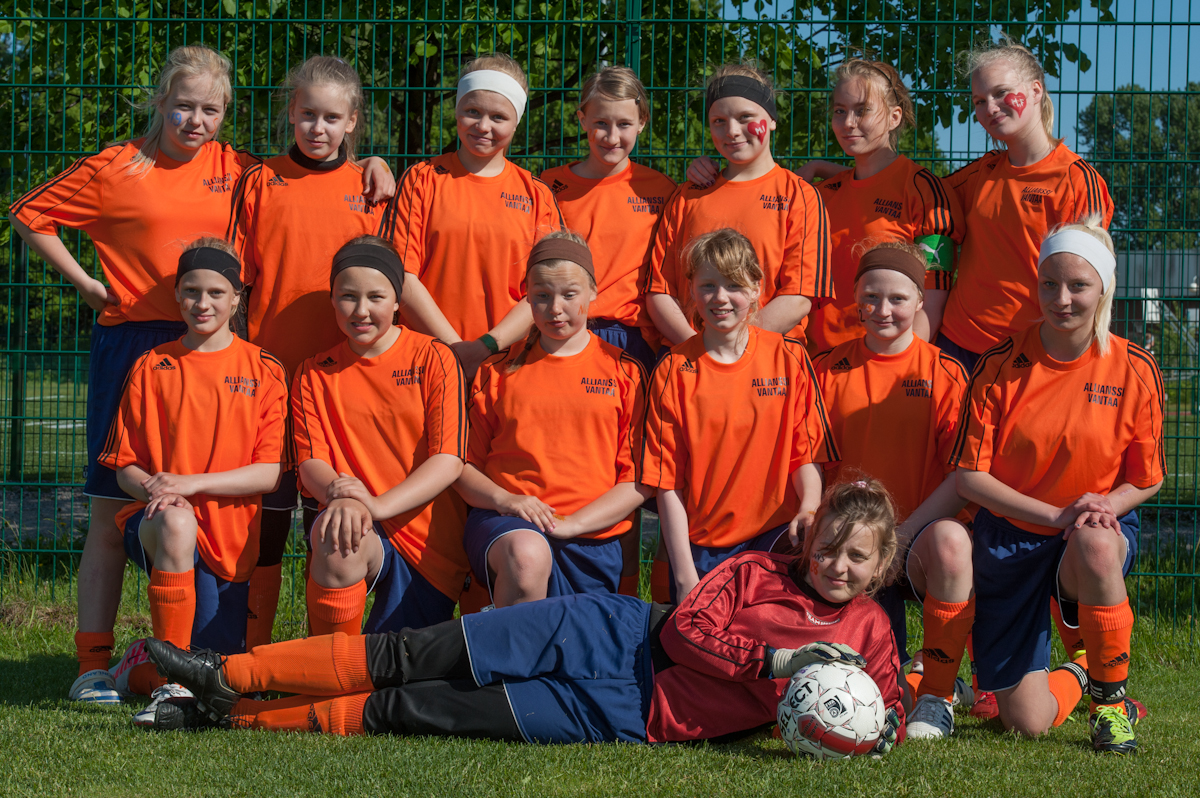
Allianssi Vantaa T98 at Stadi Cup 2012

Allianssi Vantaa T98 was a girls' football (soccer) team, founded in October 2011 from the players born between 1998 and 1999 of Korson Palloseura and Koivukylän Palloseura football clubs. The team broke up in late 2014, after 3 years of playing together.

The joint team was established to allow the girls from both clubs to continue playing in matches after the teams lost their coaches, and a number of players moved to other football clubs.

== Sources ==
- Official Website (in Finnish)
- Allianssi Vantaa Facebook
- Allianssi Vantaa T98 girls (in English)
- Allianssi Vantaa T98 (in Finnish)
