= Dennis Okaru =

Nigerian footballer (born 1990)

Personal information
- Date of birth: 5 December 1990 (age 35)
- Position: Winger

Senior career*
Years	Team	Apps	(Gls)
2011–2014	TPS	63	(11)
- * Club domestic league appearances and goals as of 31 December 2014

Dennis Okaru (born 5 December 1990) is a Nigerian football player who last played for Finnish Veikkausliiga side TPS.
