= Salpausselän Reipas =

Finnish football club

- Full name: Salpausselän Reipas
- Nickname(s): SalReipas
- Founded: 2004; 21 years ago
- Ground: Kisapuisto tekonurmi, Lahti; Finland
- Chairman: Tero Rantala
- Coach: Mika Leppäkynnäs
- League: Kolmonen
- 2009: 2nd – Kolmonen (Helsinki and Uusimaa) – Section 3
Home colours

Salpausselän Reipas (abbreviated SalReipas) is a football club from Lahti in Finland. The club was formed in 2004 and their home ground is at the Mukkulan kenttä. The first team currently plays in the Kolmonen (Third Division), the fourth tier of Finnish football. The Chairman of SalReipas is Tero Rantala.

== History ==
The club was founded in 2004 and has made rapid progress since they began competitive football with the SPL Uusimaa in 2005 in Section 7 of the Kutonen (Sixth Division) which they won at the first attempt. Further promotions followed in the next two seasons in 2006 and 2007 when the club won Section 3 of the Vitonen (Fifth Division) and Section 2 of the Nelonen (Fourth Division) respectively. In their first three seasons the club only lost 1 league match and won the other 55 matches, scoring 322 goals in the process. In the last two seasons SalReipas have competed in Section 3 of the Kolmonen finishing 4th in 2008 and 2nd in 2009. The latter season was a great disappointment with the club missing out on promotion by 2 points to local rivals City Stars.

In the 2010 Finnish Cup (Suomen Cup) SalReipas showed both their pedigree and future potential by reaching Round 6 before finally going out 1–2 at home to Ilves. Highlights of the competition were home wins against Kakkonen opposition – 4–1 against Lohjan Pallo and 2–0 against Laajasalon Palloseura.

SalReipas Akatemia began operations in October 2009 as the club's second team. The team was established to serve the needs of young hopefuls who are not yet ready for first team football. They created a club record on 24 May 2010 with a 25–0 win against Hyvinkään Urheiluseura 1. Their home ground is at the Kisapuiston tekonurmi.

== Season to season ==
Season	Level	Division	Section	Administration	Position	Movements
2005	Tier 7	Kutonen (Sixth Division)	Section 7	Uusimaa (SPL Uusimaa)	1st	Promoted
2006	Tier 6	Vitonen (Fifth Division)	Section 3	Uusimaa (SPL Uusimaa)	1st	Promoted
2007	Tier 5	Nelonen (Fourth Division)	Section 2	Uusimaa (SPL Uusimaa)	1st	Promoted
2008	Tier 4	Kolmonen (Third Division)	Section 3	Helsinki & Uusimaa (SPL Helsinki)	4th	
2009	Tier 4	Kolmonen (Third Division)	Section 3	Helsinki & Uusimaa (SPL Uusimaa)	2nd	
2010	Tier 4	Kolmonen (Third Division)	Section 3	Helsinki & Uusimaa (SPL Uusimaa)	2nd	

- 3 seasons in Kolmonen
- 1 season in Nelonen
- 1 season in Vitonen
- 1 season in Kutonen

== Honours and achievements ==
- Kutonen (Section 7) Winners – 2005
- Vitonen (Section 3) Winners – 2006
- Nelonen (Section 2) Winners – 2007
- Round 6 of Finnish Cup – 2010

== Club Structure ==
SalReipas have 2 men's teams. The club does not currently run a junior section.

== 2010 season ==
SalReipas Men's Team are competing in Section 3 (Lohko 3) of the Kolmonen administered by Uusimaa SPL. This is the fourth highest tier in the Finnish football system. In 2009 Salpausselän Reipas finished in second position in Section 3 of the Kolmonen (Third Division).

SalReipas Akatemia are participating in Section 7 (Lohko 7) of the Kutonen administered by the Uusimaa SPL.

== References and sources ==
- Official Website
- Suomen Cup
