= Ilja Venäläinen =

Finnish footballer (born 1980)

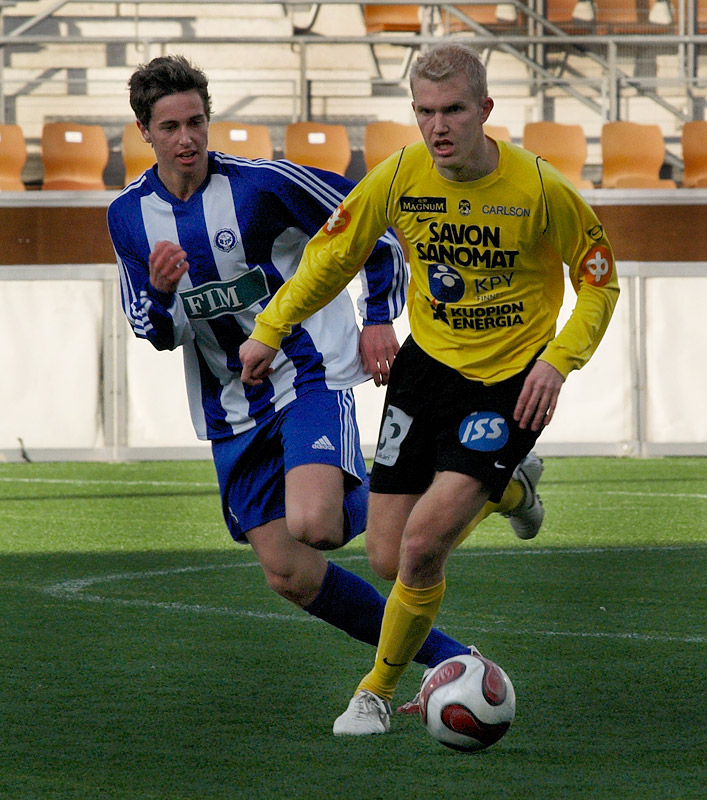
- Sakari Mattila (left) trailing Ilja Venäläinen of KuPS

Personal information
- Date of birth: 27 September 1980 (age 46)
- Place of birth: Kuopio, Finland
- Height: 1.88 m (6 ft 2 in)
- Position: Striker

Youth career
- –1997: KuPS

Senior career*
Years	Team	Apps	(Gls)
1998–2003	KuPS	141	(42)
2004	FF Jaro	21	(5)
2005–2006	KooTeePee	49	(13)
2008–2013	KuPS	97	(29)

International career^{‡}
2000–2001	Finland U-21	12	(0)
2011	Finland	1	(0)
- * Club domestic league appearances and goals as of 16 October 2010 ‡ National team caps and goals as of 10 February 2011

Ilja Venäläinen (born 27 September 1980) is a retired Finnish football player. He played for FF Jaro and FC KooTeePee and most recently for Kuopion Palloseura (KuPS), in the Finnish Premier League.
