= Mikkelin Kissat =

Finnish football club

- Full name: Mikkelin Kissat
- Founded: 1981
- Ground: Mikkelin Urheilupuisto, Mikkeli, Finland
- Capacity: 7,000
- Chairman: Jyri Paasonen
- Manager: Tommi Ekmark
- League: Kakkonen
| Home colours | Away colours |

Mikkelin Kissat (abbreviated MiKi) is a football club from Mikkeli, Finland. Its home ground is at the Mikkelin Urheilupuisto. MiKi is affiliated to SPL Kaakkois-Suomen piiri, the south eastern regional district of the Finnish FA.

== Background ==
The club was formed in 1981 but was not formally registered until 1983. They started in V divisioona, the fifth division in 1984 and rapid progress followed with the club soon gaining promotion to II divisioona, the second division, in 1986. They lasted there only two years as relegation ensued in 1988. Once again Kissat was promoted to II divisioona in 1993 and finally cemented their place there, reaching even the promotion battle of the division quite soon. An especially memorable year was 1995, when Kissat almost achieved an entire season without losses. They also won the "Pikkufinaali", a final for the two best lower league teams in the Finnish Cup (Suomen Cup) in 1994.

Even with MiKi finding success in the second division (now called Kakkonen) as the 2000 millennium neared its end, the perennial local rivals MP were in financial problems after being relegated to Ykkönen, the Finnish first division. In 1999, the two clubs decided to share their resources and players and merged to form mutual first team and an under 21s team called FC Mikkeli, as well as a reserve team called Mikkelin Pallo (MiPa) which played a division below in Kakkonen. The fusion lasted only for three years without much success, as in 2001 FC Mikkeli was relegated to Kakkonen and the club was disbanded. Both MiKi and MP returned to first-team football by taking FC Mikkeli's and MiPa's places in Kakkonen. Since then Kissat has played in Kakkonen in 2002, 2004–2005 and 2007, and the rest of the seasons in Kolmonen.

MiKi's short history is also inextricably linked to that of Mikkelin Pallo-Kissat (MiPK) which was formed in 1946, with roots of the club leading back even to the very early 20th century to a multi-sport club called Mikkelin Vauhti. Pallo-Kissat were quite successful in their day as they played in the top level of Finnish football, back then called Mestaruussarja, over the years 1962–1964, 1971 and 1974–1979. In 1962, 1974 and 1975 they reached fourth place of the league, the most highest position in top-level football in the club's history. But towards the 1980s, the club began experiencing severe economic distress and finally after being relegated to the second division, they were declared bankrupt at the start of the season in 1984. MiPK players transferred to the newly established MiKi which provided a sound foundation for the new club's future.

Mikkelin Kissat run an active youth section with teams up to under 20's, and hold the youth tournament Mikkeli Turnaus each year. West Ham United goalkeeper Jussi Jääskeläinen and former Newcastle United striker Shefki Kuqi are both products of the MiKi youth setup.

From 2016 men's team used name of the clubs predecessor Mikkelin Pallo-Kissat. In 2020 whole club continued as a Mikkelin Pallo-Kissat

== Season to season ==
| Season | Level | Division | Section | Position | Movements |
|---|---|---|---|---|---|
| 1984 | Tier 6 | V divisioona (Fifth Division) | Saimaa | 1st | Promoted |
| 1985 | Tier 5 | IV divisioona (Fourth Division) | 11. lohko (Group 11) | 1st | Promoted |
| 1986 | Tier 4 | III divisioona (Third Division) | 6. lohko (Group 6) | 1st | Promoted |
| 1987 | Tier 3 | II divisioona (Second Division) | Itälohko (East Group) | 8th | |
| 1988 | Tier 3 | II divisioona (Second Division) | Itälohko (East Group) | 12th | Relegated |
| 1989 | Tier 4 | III divisioona (Third Division) | 6. lohko (Group 6) | 3rd | |
| 1990 | Tier 4 | III divisioona (Third Division) | 6. lohko (Group 6) | 5th | |
| 1991 | Tier 4 | III divisioona (Third Division) | 6. lohko (Group 6) | 8th | |
| 1992 | Tier 4 | III divisioona (Third Division) | 6. lohko (Group 6) | 4th | |
| 1993 | Tier 4 | III divisioona (Third Division) | 7. lohko (Group 7) | 2nd | Promoted |
| 1994 | Tier 3 | II divisioona (Second Division) | Itälohko (East Group) | 8th | |
| 1995 | Tier 3 | Kakkonen (Second Division) | Itälohko (East Group) | 4th | |
| 1996 | Tier 3 | Kakkonen (Second Division) | Itälohko (East Group) | 6th | |
| 1997 | Tier 3 | Kakkonen (Second Division) | Itälohko (East Group) | 3rd | |
| 1998 | Tier 3 | Kakkonen (Second Division) | Itälohko (East Group) | 6th | Merged with MP to form FC Mikkeli |
| 2002 | Tier 3 | Kakkonen (Second Division) | Itälohko (East Group) | 11th | FC Mikkeli was disbanded and MiKi returned; relegated |
| 2003 | Tier 4 | Kolmonen (Third Division) | Kaakkois-Suomi (South Eastern Finland) | 1st | Playoff Group C – 1st – Promoted |
| 2004 | Tier 3 | Kakkonen (Second Division) | Itälohko (East Group) | 9th | |
| 2005 | Tier 3 | Kakkonen (Second Division) | Itälohko (East Group) | 12th | Relegated |
| 2006 | Tier 4 | Kolmonen (Third Division) | Kaakkois-Suomi (South Eastern Finland) | 1st | Playoff Group C – 2nd – Promoted |
| 2007 | Tier 3 | Kakkonen (Second Division) | Lohko A (Group A) | 14th | Relegated |
| 2008 | Tier 4 | Kolmonen (Third Division) | Kaakkois-Suomi (South Eastern Finland) | 5th | |
| 2009 | Tier 4 | Kolmonen (Third Division) | Kaakkois-Suomi (South Eastern Finland) | 2nd | |
| 2010 | Tier 4 | Kolmonen (Third Division) | Kaakkois-Suomi (South Eastern Finland) | 3rd | |
| 2011 | Tier 4 | Kolmonen (Third Division) | Kaakkois-Suomi (South Eastern Finland) | 5th | |
| 2012 | Tier 4 | Kolmonen (Third Division) | Kaakkois-Suomi (South Eastern Finland) | 8th | |
| 2013 | Tier 4 | Kolmonen (Third Division) | Kaakkois-Suomi (South Eastern Finland) | 4th | |
| 2014 | Tier 4 | Kolmonen (Third Division) | Kaakkois-Suomi (South Eastern Finland) | 4th | |
| 2015 | Tier 4 | Kolmonen (Third Division) | Kaakkois-Suomi (South Eastern Finland) | 2nd | |
| 2016 | Tier 4 | Kolmonen (Third Division) | Kaakkois-Suomi (South Eastern Finland) | 1st | Promoted as MiPK |
| 2017 | Tier 3 | Kakkonen (Second Division) | Lohko A (Group A) | 6th | as MiPK |
| 2018 | Tier 3 | Kakkonen (Second Division) | Lohko A (Group A) | 4th | as MiPK |
| 2019 | Tier 3 | Kakkonen (Second Division) | Lohko A (Group A) | 9th | as MiPK. Continued as a MiPK |

- 11 seasons in Kakkonen / II divisioona
- 15 seasons in Kolmonen / III divisioona
- 1 season in Nelonen / IV divisioona
- 1 season in Vitonen / V divisioona

== Head coaches ==
- (Finland) Antti Ronkainen (2000–2001)
- (Finland) Teppo Yli-Karro (2002)
- (Finland) Jorma Immonen (2003)
- (Hungary) Tibor Gruborovics (2004)
- (Finland) Jorma Immonen (2005)
- (Finland) Jukka Gråsten (2006)
- (Finland) Janne Wilkman (2007)
- (Finland) Risto Lähde (2008–2011)
- (Finland) Tommi Sariola (2011)
- (Finland) Jukka Gråsten (2012)
- (Finland) Timo Vehviläinen (2013–)

== Top scorers ==
| Season | Player | Goals |
|---|---|---|
| 2002 | (Finland) Iiro Kiukas | 14 |
| 2003 | (Finland) Miikka Oinonen | 24 |
| 2004 | (Finland) Joona Ikonen | 7 |
| 2005 | (Finland) Juha-Matti Murtonen | 6 |
| 2006 | (Finland) Iiro Kiukas | 14 |
| 2007 | (Finland) Iiro Kiukas | 7 |
| 2008 | (Finland) Tommi Sariola | 12 |
| 2009 | (Finland) Joona Ikonen | 13 |
| 2010 | (Finland) Tommi Sariola | 12 |
| 2011 | (Finland) Timo Mattila | 9 |
| 2012 | (Finland) Riiko Lappalainen | 8 |
| 2013 | (Finland) Miikka Oinonen | 16 |

== References and sources ==
- Official website
- Finnish Wikipedia

Specific
