= Nurmijärven Jalkapalloseura =

Finnish football club

- Full name: Nurmijärven Jalkapalloseura
- Nickname: NJS
- Founded: 2004; 22 years ago (Nateva 1967)
- Ground: Klaukkalan urheilualue, Nurmijärvi, Finland
- Chairman: Markku Siivonen
- Manager: Mikko Manninen
- League: Kolmonen
- 2026: Kakkonen Group B, 10th of 10 (relegated)
Home colours	Away colours

Nurmijärven Jalkapalloseura (abbreviated NJS) is a football club from Nurmijärvi, Finland. The club was formed in 2004 following the amalgamation of Nurmijärven Nateva and FC Nurmijärvi. The club's home ground is at the sports area of Klaukkala (Klaukkalan urheilualue). The men's first team currently plays in the Kakkonen (Third tier).

== Background ==
NJS does not have a long history but the club gained promotion from the Nelonen to the Kolmonen at the end of the 2008 season. NJS's predecessor Nateva played one season in the Kakkonen (Second Division), the third tier of the Finnish football system, in 2001. Nateva gained promotion from Section 1 of the Nelonen (Uusimaa District) at the end of the 2004 season which enabled NJS to begin life in the Kolmonen in 2005. The new club's best season to date was in 2005 when they finished in 7th place in Section 2 (Helsinki & Uusimaa).

== Season to season ==
Season to season of NJS

Season	Level	Division	Section	Administration	Position	Movements
2005	Tier 4	Kolmonen (Third Division)	Section 2	Helsinki & Uusimaa (SPL Uusimaa)	7th	
2006	Tier 4	Kolmonen (Third Division)	Section 3	Helsinki & Uusimaa (SPL Helsinki)	10th	
2007	Tier 4	Kolmonen (Third Division)	Section 1	Helsinki & Uusimaa (SPL Uusimaa)	11th	Relegated
2008	Tier 5	Nelonen (Fourth Division)	Section 1	Uusimaa District (SPL Uusimaa)	1st	Promoted
2009	Tier 4	Kolmonen (Third Division)	Section 2	Helsinki & Uusimaa (SPL Helsinki)	10th	
2010	Tier 4	Kolmonen (Third Division)	Section 2	Helsinki & Uusimaa (SPL Helsinki)	5th	
2011	Tier 4	Kolmonen (Third Division)	Group 3	Helsinki & Uusimaa (SPL Helsinki)	8th	
2012	Tier 4	Kolmonen (Third Division)	Group 2	Helsinki & Uusimaa (SPL Helsinki)	11th	Relegated
2013	Tier 5	Nelonen (Fourth Division)	Group 2	Uusimaa District (SPL Uusimaa)	1st	Promoted
2014	Tier 4	Kolmonen (Third Division)	Group 3	Helsinki & Uusimaa (SPL Helsinki)	1st	Promoted
2015	Tier 3	Kakkonen (Second Division)	Southern Group	Finnish FA (Suomen Pallolitto)	10th	Relegated
2016	Tier 4	Kolmonen (Third Division)	Group 3	Helsinki & Uusimaa (SPL Helsinki)	3rd	
2017	Tier 4	Kolmonen (Third Division)	Group 3	Helsinki & Uusimaa (SPL Helsinki)	1st	Promoted
2018	Tier 3	Kakkonen (Second Division)	Group A	Finnish FA (Suomen Pallolitto)	9th	
2019	Tier 3	Kakkonen (Second Division)	Group A	Finnish FA (Suomen Pallolitto)	8th	
2020	Tier 3	Kakkonen (Second Division)	Group A	Finnish FA (Suomen Pallolitto)	9th	
2021	Tier 3	Kakkonen (Second Division)	Group A	Finnish FA (Suomen Pallolitto)	9th	
2022	Tier 3	Kakkonen (Second Division)	Group A	Finnish FA (Suomen Pallolitto)	7th	
2023	Tier 3	Kakkonen (Second Division)	Group A	Finnish FA (Suomen Pallolitto)	6th	
2024	Tier 4	Kakkonen (Second Division)	Group A	Finnish FA (Suomen Pallolitto)	4th	
2025	Tier 4	Kakkonen (Second Division)	Group B	Finnish FA (Suomen Pallolitto)		

- 7 seasons in Third Tier
- 12 seasons in Fourth Tier
- 2 seasons in Fifth Tier

== Club Structure ==
Nurmijärven Jalkapalloseura runs a large number of teams including 2 men's teams, 2 men's veterans team, 2 ladies teams, 11 boys teams and 5 girls teams.

== 2010 season ==
NJS Men's Team are competing in Section 2 (Lohko 2) of the Kolmonen administered by the Helsinki SPL and Uusimaa SPL. This is the fourth highest tier in the Finnish football system. In 2009 NJS finished in tenth place in Section 2 of the Kolmonen.

NJS 2 are participating in Section 3 (Lohko 3) of the Vitonen administered by the Uusimaa SPL.

== References and sources ==
- Official website
- Finnish Wikipedia
- Suomen Cup
