= SAPA (football club) =

Finnish sports club in Helsinki

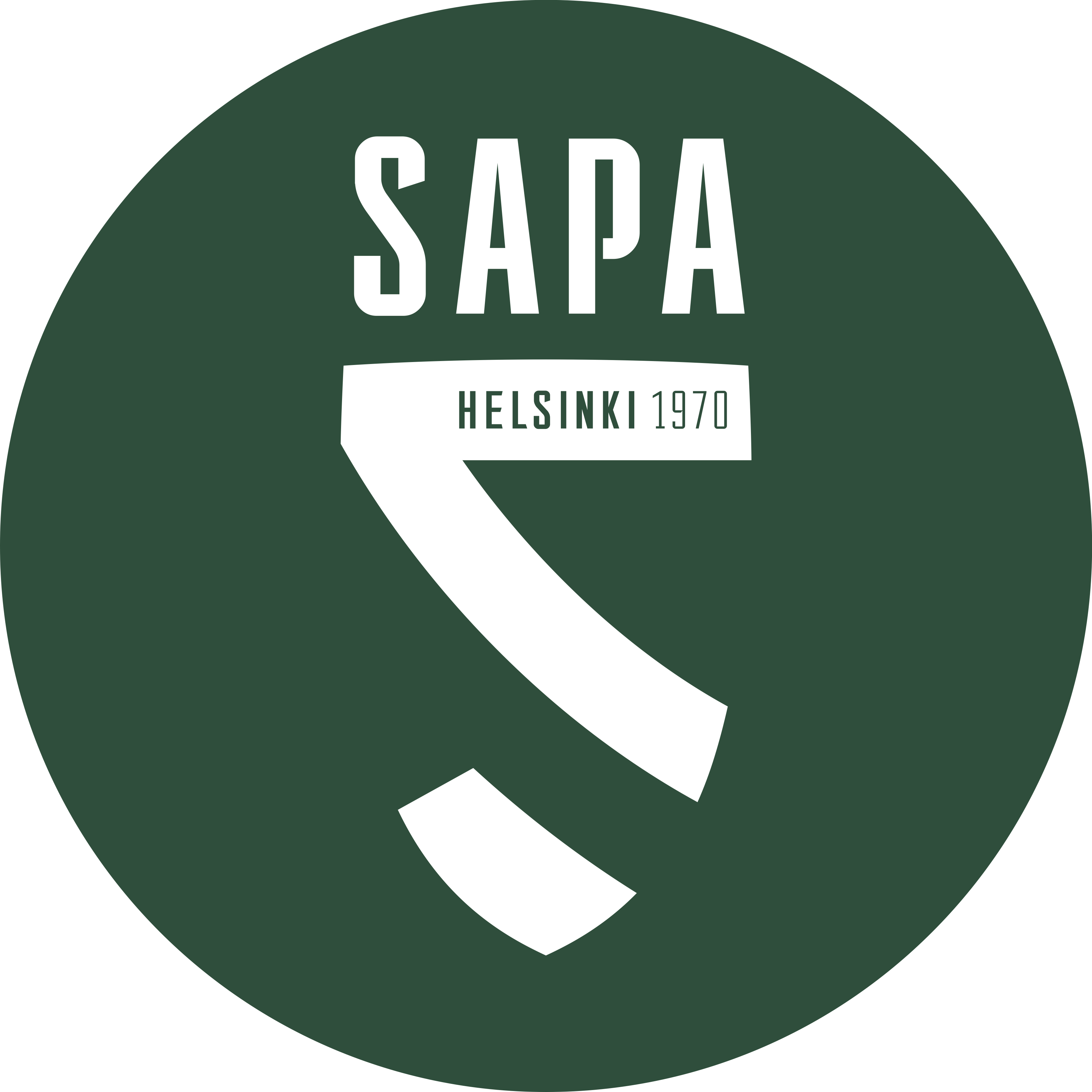
- Full name: Savannan Pallo
- Founded: 1970
- Ground: Kumpulanlaakson kenttä Helsinki; Finland
- Chairman: Jari Virta
- Manager: Kim Linerva
- Coach: Tomi Tyysteri
- League: Kolmonen
- 2011: 6th – Kolmonen (Helsinki and Uusimaa) – Section 3
Home colours	Away colours

SAPA (original name Savannan Pallo) was founded in Helsinki in 1970. The club was established at the Savanna restaurant when a group of young men wanted more activities than sitting around the place. It was eventually decided that a sports club's name could not be the restaurant's name and as a result the name was changed to the abbreviation SAPA. In addition to football the club provides for the sport of floorball.

SAPA run two men's teams, their home ground being located at the Kumpulanlaakson kenttä. (Kumpulanlaakso playing-field). The women's football team played one season in the 1970s in the Finnish first division. Junior football started in June 1986 and the club currently provides for a wide range of age groups. In total the club has over 50 adult players and more than 250 junior players.

Most recently in the 2020/21 season, the highest ranking men's team, SAPA M3, finished 4th in Kolmonen. SAPA M3 boasts an squad with international players, and a loyal fan following group called the SAPA ULTRAS.

== Season to season ==
Season	Level	Division	Section	Administration	Position	Movements
2000	Tier 4	Kolmonen (Third Division)	Section 1	Helsinki & Uusimaa (SPL Helsinki)	10th	
2001	Tier 4	Kolmonen (Third Division)	Section 1	Helsinki & Uusimaa (SPL Uusimaa)	10th	
2002	Tier 4	Kolmonen (Third Division)	Section 2	Helsinki & Uusimaa (SPL Uusimaa)	4th	
2003	Tier 4	Kolmonen (Third Division)	Section 2	Helsinki & Uusimaa (SPL Uusimaa)	5th	
2004	Tier 4	Kolmonen (Third Division)	Section 2	Helsinki & Uusimaa (SPL Uusimaa)	6th	
2005	Tier 4	Kolmonen (Third Division)	Section 3	Helsinki & Uusimaa (SPL Helsinki)	4th	
2006	Tier 4	Kolmonen (Third Division)	Section 2	Helsinki & Uusimaa (SPL Uusimaa)	8th	
2007	Tier 4	Kolmonen (Third Division)	Section 2	Helsinki & Uusimaa (SPL Helsinki)	9th	
2008	Tier 4	Kolmonen (Third Division)	Section 3	Helsinki & Uusimaa (SPL Helsinki)	7th	
2009	Tier 4	Kolmonen (Third Division)	Section 1	Helsinki & Uusimaa (SPL Uusimaa)	6th	
2010	Tier 4	Kolmonen (Third Division)	Section 1	Helsinki & Uusimaa (SPL Uusimaa)	3rd	
2011	Tier 4	Kolmonen (Third Division)	Section 3	Helsinki & Uusimaa (SPL Uusimaa)	6th	
2012	Tier 4	Kolmonen (Third Division)	Section 2	Helsinki & Uusimaa (SPL Uusimaa)	4th	
2013	Tier 4	Kolmonen (Third Division)	Section 1	Helsinki & Uusimaa (SPL Helsinki)	7th	
2014	Tier 4	Kolmonen (Third Division)	Section 1	Helsinki & Uusimaa (SPL Uusimaa)	7th	

- 15 seasons in Kolmonen

== 2012 season ==
For the current season SAPA are competing in Section 2 (Lohko 2) of the Kolmonen administered by the Helsinki SPL and Uusimaa SPL. This is the fourth highest tier in the Finnish football system.

SAPA/2 are participating in Section 2 (Lohko 2) of the Nelonen administered by the Helsinki SPL.

== References and sources ==
- Official Website
- Finnish Wikipedia
- Suomen Cup
- SAPA – Savannan Pallo Facebook
