= Nokian Palloseura =

Finnish sports club

- Full name: Nokian Palloseura
- Nickname(s): NoPS
- Founded: 1968
- Ground: Nokian keskuskenttä, Nokia, Finland
- Chairman: Kari Mustalahti
- Manager: Samuli Laitila
- League: Kolmonen
Home colours

Nokian Palloseura (abbreviated NoPS) is a sports club from Nokia, Finland. The men's football first team currently plays in the Kolmonen (Third Division) and their home ground is at the Nokian keskuskenttä. The floorball team plays in the Second Division.

== Background ==
The club was formed in 1968 and has provided for a number of sports including football, floorball, futsal, ice-hockey, table tennis, squash and basketball. The most successful section has been basketball between 1976 and 1993 but operations were then transferred to BC Nokia who currently compete in Division 1.

== Football ==
=== Season to season ===
Season	Level	Division	Section	Administration	Position	Movements
1971	Tier 4	IV Divisioona (Fourth Division)	Group 5 Tampere	Finnish FA (Suomen Palloliitto)	4th	
1972	Tier 4	IV Divisioona (Fourth Division)	Group 7 Tampere	Finnish FA (Suomen Palloliitto)	1st	Promoted
1973	Tier 4	III Divisioona (Third Division)	Group 4	Finnish FA (Suomen Palloliitto)	10th	Relegated
1974	Tier 5	IV Divisioona (Fourth Division)	Group 8	Finnish FA (Suomen Palloliitto)	1st	Promoted
1975	Tier 4	III Divisioona (Third Division)	Group 5	Finnish FA (Suomen Palloliitto)	7th	
1976	Tier 4	III Divisioona (Third Division)	Group 4	Finnish FA (Suomen Palloliitto)	6th	
1977	Tier 4	III Divisioona (Third Division)	Group 5	Finnish FA (Suomen Palloliitto)	7th	
1978	Tier 4	III Divisioona (Third Division)	Group 5	Finnish FA (Suomen Palloliitto)	10th	Relegated
1979	Tier 5	IV Divisioona (Fourth Division)	Group 8	Finnish FA (Suomen Palloliitto)	11th	Relegated
1980-1984						Unknown
1985	Tier 5	IV Divisioona (Fourth Division)	Group 7	Finnish FA (Suomen Palloliitto)	11th	Relegated
1986-1998						Unknown
1999	Tier 5	Nelonen (Fourth Division)	North Section	Tampere District (SPL Tampere)	5th	
2000	Tier 5	Nelonen (Fourth Division)	North Section	Tampere District (SPL Tampere)	5th	
2001	Tier 5	Nelonen (Fourth Division)	North Section	Tampere District (SPL Tampere)	1st	Promoted
2002	Tier 4	Kolmonen (Third Division)		Tampere District (SPL Tampere)	6th	
2003	Tier 4	Kolmonen (Third Division)		Tampere District (SPL Tampere)	9th	
2004	Tier 4	Kolmonen (Third Division)		Tampere District (SPL Tampere)	11th	Relegated
2005	Tier 5	Nelonen (Fourth Division)	North Section	Tampere District (SPL Tampere)	4th	
2006	Tier 5	Nelonen (Fourth Division)	North Section	Tampere District (SPL Tampere)	1st	Promoted
2007	Tier 4	Kolmonen (Third Division)		Tampere District (SPL Tampere)	5th	
2008	Tier 4	Kolmonen (Third Division)		Tampere District (SPL Tampere)	2nd	
2009	Tier 4	Kolmonen (Third Division)		Tampere District (SPL Tampere)	5th	
2010	Tier 4	Kolmonen (Third Division)		Tampere District (SPL Tampere)	4th	
2011	Tier 4	Kolmonen (Third Division)		Tampere District (SPL Tampere)	1st	Promotion Playoff
2012	Tier 4	Kolmonen (Third Division)		Tampere District (SPL Tampere)	7th	
2013	Tier 4	Kolmonen (Third Division)		Tampere District (SPL Tampere)	3rd	
2014	Tier 4	Kolmonen (Third Division)		Tampere District (SPL Tampere)	4th	
2015	Tier 4	Kolmonen (Third Division)		Tampere District (SPL Tampere)	2nd	
2016	Tier 4	Kolmonen (Third Division)		Tampere District (SPL Tampere)	6th	
2017	Tier 4	Kolmonen (Third Division)		Tampere District (SPL Tampere)	6th	
2018	Tier 4	Kolmonen (Third Division)		Tampere District (SPL Tampere)	4th	
2019	Tier 4	Kolmonen (Third Division)		Tampere District (SPL Tampere)	3rd	
2020	Tier 4	Kolmonen (Third Division)	Group B	Western District (SPL Läntinen)	3rd	
2021	Tier 4	Kolmonen (Third Division)	Group B	Western District (SPL Läntinen)	2nd	
2022	Tier 4	Kolmonen (Third Division)	Group B	Western District (SPL Läntinen)	1st	Promotion Playoff
2023	Tier 4	Kolmonen (Third Division)	Group B	Western District (SPL Läntinen)	2nd	
2024	Tier 5	Kolmonen (Third Division)	Group B	Western District (SPL Läntinen)	3rd	
2025	Tier 5	Kolmonen (Third Division)	Group B	Western District (SPL Läntinen)		

- 27 seasons in 4th Tier
- 10 seasons in 5th Tier

=== Club structure ===
Nokian Palloseura run a number of teams including 2 men's teams, 1 men's veterans team and 12 boys teams. The club has 339 registered players and is the eighth largest football club in Tampere district. The club also run a soccer school.

=== 2010 season ===
NoPS Men's Team are competing in the Kolmonen section administered by the Tampere SPL. This is the fourth highest tier in the Finnish football system. In 2009 NoPS finished in fifth place in the Kolmonen.

NoPS 2 are participating in Section 3 (Lohko 3) of the Kutonen administered by the Tampere SPL.

== References and sources ==
- Official Website
- Finnish Wikipedia
- Suomen Cup
- NoPS Jalkapallo Facebook
