= Korson Palloseura =

Finnish football club

- Full name: Korson Palloseura
- Nickname: KOPSE
- Founded: 1980; 46 years ago
- Ground: Havukosken nurmi, Vantaa, Finland
- Chairman: Kaj Wiander
- Coach: Teijo Parikka
- League: Kutonen
Home colours

Korson Palloseura (abbreviated KOPSE) is a football club from Korso, Vantaa, Finland. The club was formed in 1980 and currently has over 800 members. The men's football first team currently plays in the Kutonen (6th Division) and their home ground is at the Aulis Aktia Areena at Jokivarsi.

== Background ==
KOPSE was established in 1980 and to date has played in the lower divisions of the Finnish football league. Over the last decade the club has oscillated between the Kolmonen (Third Division) and Nelonen (Fourth Division) with 2 promotions and 2 relegations.

== Season to season ==
Season	Level	Division	Section	Administration	Position	Movements
2000	Tier 4	Kolmonen (Third Division)	Section 3	Helsinki & Uusimaa (SPL Uusimaa)	10th	
2001	Tier 4	Kolmonen (Third Division)	Section 3	Helsinki & Uusimaa (SPL Helsinki)		
2002	Tier 4	Kolmonen (Third Division)	Section 3	Helsinki & Uusimaa (SPL Helsinki)	7th	
2003	Tier 4	Kolmonen (Third Division)	Section 2	Helsinki & Uusimaa (SPL Uusimaa)	11th	Relegated
2004	Tier 5	Nelonen (Fourth Division)	Section 2	Uusimaa District (SPL Uusimaa)	1st	Promoted
2005	Tier 4	Kolmonen (Third Division)	Section 3	Helsinki & Uusimaa (SPL Helsinki)	11th	Relegated
2006	Tier 5	Nelonen (Fourth Division)	Section 2	Uusimaa District (SPL Uusimaa)	4th	
2007	Tier 5	Nelonen (Fourth Division)	Section 2	Uusimaa District (SPL Uusimaa)	4th	
2008	Tier 5	Nelonen (Fourth Division)	Section 2	Uusimaa District (SPL Uusimaa)	1st	Promoted
2009	Tier 4	Kolmonen (Third Division)	Section 3	Helsinki & Uusimaa (SPL Uusimaa)	10th	
2010	Tier 4	Kolmonen (Third Division)	Section 3	Helsinki & Uusimaa (SPL Uusimaa)	8th	

- 7 seasons in Kolmonen
- 4 seasons in Nelonen

== Club Structure ==
Korson Palloseura run 25 teams including men's team, ladies team, boys teams, girls teams and adults hobby teams.

== 2010 season ==
KOPSE Men's Team are competing in Section 3 (Lohko 3) of the Kolmonen (Third Division) administered by the Uusimaa SPL. This is the fourth highest tier in the Finnish football system. In 2009 KOPSE finished in 10th place in Section 3 (Lohko 3) of the Kolmonen.

KOPSE / 2 are competing in Section 5 (Lohko 5) of the Vitonen (Fifth Division) administered by the Uusimaa SPL.

KOPSE / 3 are competing in Section 5 (Lohko 5) of the Kutonen (Sixth Division) administered by the Uusimaa SPL.
