= SC Riverball =

Finnish football club

Soccer Club Riverball
- Full name: Soccer Club Riverball
- Nickname(s): SC Riverball
- Founded: 2006
- Ground: Koillispuisto field
- Chairman: Rauno Pasanen
- Head Coach: Tommi Piipponen
- Coach: Iiro Kärkkäinen
- League: Vitonen
- 2023: 6th – Vitonen Eastern Finland A3
Home colours	Away colours

Soccer Club Riverball is a football club from Joensuu in Finland. The club was formed in 2006 and their home ground is at Koillispuisto field. The men's first team currently plays in the Vitonen (Level 7 of the Finnish League System). The Chairman of SC Riverball is Rauno Pasanen.

== History ==
The club was established in 2006 and has played in the Central and Eastern Finland (Keski- and Itä-Suomi) section of the Kolmonen, (Third Division). In 2009 SC Riverball finished in pole position and were promoted for the first time to the Kakkonen.

=== Club structure ===
SC Riverball runs two men's teams. In addition the club has an active veteran's section and runs four teams at this level.

=== 2010 season ===
SC Riverball Men's Team are competing in Group A (Lohko A) of the Kakkonen administered by the Football Association of Finland (Suomen Palloliitto) . This is the third highest tier in the Finnish football system. In 2009 Soccer Club Riverball finished in first position in their Kolmonen section.

SC Riverball/2 are participating in Section A (Lohko A) of the Nelonen administered by the Itä-Suomi SPL.

== Current squad ==
as of 22 December 2012 Note: Flags indicate national team as defined under FIFA eligibility rules; some limited exceptions apply. Players may hold more than one non-FIFA nationality.

No.	Pos.	Nation	Player
1	GK	FIN	Juha-Matti Ryynänen
2	DF	FIN	Antti Kiimamaa
3	DF	FIN	Eero Naakka
4	DF	FIN	Perttu Rytivaara
5	DF	FIN	Joona Sistonen
6	MF	FIN	Tommi Piipponen
7	MF	FIN	Hermanni Peltola
8	MF	FIN	Mikko Alamäki
10	FW	RUS	Anton Kuzmin
11	MF	FIN	Eero Kanerva
14	FW	FIN	Olli Muttonen
15	MF	FIN	Joni-Jukka Korhonen

No.	Pos.	Nation	Player
16	MF	FIN	Mikko Malinen
17	FW	FIN	Teemu Nielikäinen
18	MF	FIN	Kimi Koskinen
20	FW	FIN	Esa Kokko
21	DF	FIN	Vili Väänänen
23	FW	FIN	Juha-Pekka Roivainen
28	GK	FIN	Antti Jäntti
41	MF	ALB	Henri Pupaza
44	DF	FIN	Erno Pennanen
87	FW	FIN	Markus Pippola
89	MF	FIN	Markus Ihalainen

=== Staff ===
Head coach

- (Finland) Tuomo Santaharju

Assistant coach

- (Hungary) Arpad Mester

Goalkeeper coach

- (Finland) Marko Karvinen

== Sources ==
- Official Website
