= Kajaanin Haka =

Finnish football club

- Full name: Kajaanin Haka
- Nickname(s): KajHa; Haka
- Founded: 1953
- Ground: Kajaanin liikuntapuisto, Kajaani; Finland
- Chairman: Jarmo Anttonen
- Head Coach: Luis Figueiredo
- Coach: Peter Olson
- League: Kakkonen
- 2009: 1st – Kolmonen (Pohjois-Suomi)
Home colours	Away colours

Kajaanin Haka (abbreviated KajHa) is a football club from Kajaani in Finland. The club was formed in 1953 and their home ground is at the Kajaanin liikuntapuisto. The men's football first team currently plays in the Kolmonen (Third Division). The Chairman of KajHa is Jarmo Anttonen.

== Background ==
KajHa was founded on 15 March 1953 and in the early years the club was known as Hevossuon Haka. The change to the current name was made on 23 January 1963. Originally Haka was a typical village club, which in addition to football ran sections providing for sports of athletics, skiing, and volleyball. Specialisation in football occurred in the early 1960s and has remained the popular activity. There are currently 245 registered players and the number is growing all the time.

The club's first taste of success was in 1968 when they played one season in the Suomisarjaa (Finland League) which at that time was the second tier of Finnish football. They have had four other periods at this level, currently known as the Ykkönen (First Division) in 1970–71, 1985–86, 1993–94, 1998–99.

Haka have had nine periods covering 21 seasons in the Kakkonen (Second Division), the third tier of Finnish football covering 1975, 1979, 1981–84, 1987, 1990–92, 1995–97, 2000–05, 2007 and the current season 2010.

In 1999 KajHa won the Työväen Urheiluliiton Cup (Workers' Sports Federation Cup) for the first time in their history.

The attendance record for a KajHa match was the 1968 derby match with Kajaanin Palloilijat which was watched by 2,376 spectators.

== Season to season ==
Season	Level	Division	Section	Administration	Position	Movements
1994	Tier 2	Ykkönen (First Division)		Finnish FA (Suomen Pallolitto)	13th	Relegated
1995	Tier 3	Kakkonen (Second Division)	North Group	Finnish FA (Suomen Pallolitto)	3rd	
1996	Tier 3	Kakkonen (Second Division)	North Group	Finnish FA (Suomen Pallolitto)	2nd	
1997	Tier 3	Kakkonen (Second Division)	North Group	Finnish FA (Suomen Pallolitto)	1st	Promoted
1998	Tier 2	Ykkönen (First Division)	North Group	Finnish FA (Suomen Pallolitto)	7th	North Relegation Group
1999	Tier 2	Ykkönen (First Division)	North Group	Finnish FA (Suomen Pallolitto)	10th	North Relegation Group – Relegated
2000	Tier 3	Kakkonen (Second Division)	East Group	Finnish FA (Suomen Pallolitto)	5th	
2001	Tier 3	Kakkonen (Second Division)	North Group	Finnish FA (Suomen Pallolitto)	8th	
2002	Tier 3	Kakkonen (Second Division)	North Group	Finnish FA (Suomen Pallolitto)	10th	
2003	Tier 3	Kakkonen (Second Division)	East Group	Finnish FA (Suomen Pallolitto)	8th	
2004	Tier 3	Kakkonen (Second Division)	East Group	Finnish FA (Suomen Pallolitto)	10th	
2005	Tier 3	Kakkonen (Second Division)	North Group	Finnish FA (Suomen Pallolitto)	11th	Relegated
2006	Tier 4	Kolmonen (Third Division)		Northern Finland (SPL Pohjois-Suomi)	1st	Playoff Group C – Promoted
2007	Tier 3	Kakkonen (Second Division)	Group C	Finnish FA (Suomen Pallolitto)	12th	Relegated
2008	Tier 4	Kolmonen (Third Division)		Northern Finland (SPL Pohjois-Suomi)	3rd	
2009	Tier 4	Kolmonen (Third Division)		Northern Finland (SPL Pohjois-Suomi)	1st	Promoted
2010	Tier 3	Kakkonen (Second Division)	Group C	Finnish FA (Suomen Pallolitto)	13th	Relegated
2011	Tier 4	Kolmonen (Third Division)		Northern Finland (SPL Pohjois-Suomi)	2nd	
2012	Tier 4	Kolmonen (Third Division)		Northern Finland (SPL Pohjois-Suomi)	5th	
2013	Tier 4	Kolmonen (Third Division)		Northern Finland (SPL Pohjois-Suomi)	5th	
2014	Tier 4	Kolmonen (Third Division)		Northern Finland (SPL Pohjois-Suomi)	8th	
2015	Tier 4	Kolmonen (Third Division)		Northern Finland (SPL Pohjois-Suomi)	6th	
2016	Tier 4	Kolmonen (Third Division)		Northern Finland (SPL Pohjois-Suomi)	1st	Promoted
2017	Tier 3	Kakkonen (Second Division)	Group C	Finnish FA (Suomen Pallolitto)		

- 3 seasons in Ykkönen
- 12 seasons in Kakkonen
- 9 seasons in Kolmonen

== Junior section ==
The club provides for 5 different age groups for boys and in 2008 . In 2008 Kajaani Haka was selected as northern Finland's first football club to meet the new quality standards for coaching from which benefits are now experienced throughout the Kainuu region.

The club runs the Kainuun nappulaliiga (Kainuu Little League) for 5–12 years old boys and girls throughout the year. It covers almost the whole of the Kainuu region including Paltamo, Puolanka, Suomussalmi, Hyrynsalmi, Sotkamo, Kuhmo and Kajaani.

A traditional event provided by the club in the winter in January and February is the Tammiturnaus.

== Club structure ==
KajHa currently has 1 men's team and 5 boys teams.

== Current squad ==
Note: Flags indicate national team as defined under FIFA eligibility rules; some limited exceptions apply. Players may hold more than one non-FIFA nationality.

No.	Pos.	Nation	Player
1	GK	FIN	Toni Soini
4	MF	FIN	Väinö Juntunen
6	DF	FIN	Santeri Nukarinen
7	FW	FIN	Leevi Kemppainen
8	MF	FIN	Aleksi Fomin
9	FW	FIN	Severi Manninen
11	MF	FIN	Timo Liimatta
12	GK	FIN	Olli Karppinen
13	MF	FIN	Joona Ojala
14	MF	FIN	Jesse Kemppainen
15	DF	FIN	Joonas Tikkanen
16	DF	FIN	Joona Heiskanen
17	DF		Mabrouk Naoufel
17	MF	PAK	Saddam Hussain
18	FW	FIN	Timo Väisänen
19	FW	FIN	Juuso Rissanen

No.	Pos.	Nation	Player
21	MF	FIN	Arsi Kähkönen
22	FW	FIN	Tommi Lukkari
23	DF	FIN	Konsta Hurskainen
24	DF	FIN	Tuomas Ingalsuo
25	DF	NGA	Edozie Chiedra
25	FW	FIN	Arttu Seppänen
26	MF	FIN	Lassi Toppinen
27	MF	FIN	Juuso Pikkarainen
27	MF	SRB	Nikola Erceg
28	DF	FIN	Harkko Helvelahti
29	FW	FIN	Jimi Sirviö
25	FW	FIN	Patrik Ahola
30	DF	NGA	Chinedu Nwanneka
37	FW	BRA	Vitor Borges

== References and sources ==
- Official Website
- Finnish Wikipedia
- Kajaanin Haka Facebook
