= Bollklubben-46 =

Finnish multi-sport club

- Full name: Bollklubben-46
- Nickname(s): BK-46
- Founded: 1946
- Ground: Karis sportplan, Karis, Raseborg, Finland
- Chairman: Leif Österholm
- Head Coach: Markku Palmroos
- Coach: Hans Holmqvist
- League: Kakkonen
- 2012: 2012 Kakkonen (Southern Group), 2nd
Home colours

Bollklubben-46 (abbreviated BK-46) is a sports club from Karis, Raseborg in Finland. The club was formed in 1946 and the main activities covered are football and handball (see BK-46) with large junior sections in both disciplines. BK-46 men's first team currently plays in the Kakkonen (Second Division), the third level of football in Finland. Their home ground is at the Karis sportplan. The Chairman of the club is Leif Österholm.

== History ==
BK-46 was founded in 1946 and from the outset specialised in the sports of football and handball. The club has been more successful at handball and the men's team have won the SM Championship 20 times and the women's SM championship once.

The club has not always been successful and in 1974 ceased operations completely as the result of a poor economic situation. When the organisation was re-launched it was as two separate sections for football and handball.

BK-46 most successful period for football was in the late 1950s and the 1960s when they spent four seasons in the Suomensarja (Finland League), which at that time was the second tier of Finnish football, in 1957, 1961 and 1968–69. There then followed many barren years in the lower divisions until 2009 when the club won Section 1 of the Kolmonen (Helsinki and Uusimaa). The year 2010 is the club's first season in the Kakkonen (Second Division), the third tier of Finnish football.

== Season to season ==
Season	Level	Division	Section	Administration	Position	Movements
1947-48	Tier 3	Maakuntasarja (Third Division)	West Uusimaa	Finnish FA (Suomen Pallolitto)	3rd	
1948	Tier 3	Maakuntasarja (Third Division)	West Group B	Finnish FA (Suomen Pallolitto)	2nd	Promotion Playoff
1949	Tier 3	Maakuntasarja (Third Division)	West Group B	Finnish FA (Suomen Pallolitto)	1st	Promotion Playoff
1950	Tier 3	Maakuntasarja (Third Division)	South Group B	Finnish FA (Suomen Pallolitto)	2nd	
1951	Tier 3	Maakuntasarja (Third Division)	West Group A	Finnish FA (Suomen Pallolitto)	1st	Promotion Group West 4th
1952	Tier 3	Maakuntasarja (Third Division)	West Group A	Finnish FA (Suomen Pallolitto)	1st	Promotion Group West 7th
1953	Tier 3	Maakuntasarja (Third Division)	West Group A	Finnish FA (Suomen Pallolitto)	2nd	
1954	Tier 3	Maakuntasarja (Third Division)	West Group III	Finnish FA (Suomen Pallolitto)	3rd	
1955	Tier 3	Maakuntasarja (Third Division)	South Group I	Finnish FA (Suomen Pallolitto)	4th	
1956	Tier 3	Maakuntasarja (Third Division)	South Group I	Finnish FA (Suomen Pallolitto)	1st	Promotion Playoff - Promoted
1957	Tier 2	Suomensarja (Second Division)	East Group	Finnish FA (Suomen Palloliitto)	9th	Relegated
1958	Tier 3	Maakuntasarja (Third Division)	Group 3	Finnish FA (Suomen Pallolitto)	7th	
1959	Tier 3	Maakuntasarja (Third Division)	Group 1	Finnish FA (Suomen Pallolitto)	4th	
1960	Tier 3	Maakuntasarja (Third Division)	Group 1	Finnish FA (Suomen Pallolitto)	1st	Promoted
1961	Tier 2	Suomensarja (Second Division)	West Group	Finnish FA (Suomen Palloliitto)	10th	Relegated
1962	Tier 3	Maakuntasarja (Third Division)	Group 1	Finnish FA (Suomen Pallolitto)	2nd	
1963	Tier 3	Maakuntasarja (Third Division)	Group 2	Finnish FA (Suomen Pallolitto)	2nd	
1964	Tier 3	Maakuntasarja (Third Division)	Group 2	Finnish FA (Suomen Pallolitto)	3rd	
1965	Tier 3	Maakuntasarja (Third Division)	Group 2	Finnish FA (Suomen Pallolitto)	3rd	
1966	Tier 3	Maakuntasarja (Third Division)	Group 3	Finnish FA (Suomen Pallolitto)	1st	Promotion rematch
1967	Tier 3	Maakuntasarja (Third Division)	Group 2	Finnish FA (Suomen Pallolitto)	1st	Promoted
1968	Tier 2	Suomensarja (Second Division)	South Group	Finnish FA (Suomen Palloliitto)	6th	
1969	Tier 2	Suomensarja (Second Division)	South Group	Finnish FA (Suomen Palloliitto)	10th	Relegated
1970	Tier 3	III Divisioona (Third Division)	Group 2	Finnish FA (Suomen Pallolitto)	2nd	
1971	Tier 3	III Divisioona (Third Division)	Group 1	Finnish FA (Suomen Pallolitto)	3rd	
1972	Tier 3	III Divisioona (Third Division)	Group 1	Finnish FA (Suomen Pallolitto)	4th	
1973	Tier 4	III Divisioona (Third Division)	Group 2	Finnish FA (Suomen Pallolitto)	2nd	
1974	Tier 4	III Divisioona (Third Division)	Group 2	Finnish FA (Suomen Pallolitto)	10th	Relegated
1975	Tier 5	IV Divisioona (Fourth Division)	Group 4	Finnish FA(Suomen Palloliitto)	2nd	
1976	Tier 5	IV Divisioona (Fourth Division)	Group 3	Finnish FA(Suomen Palloliitto)	2nd	
1977	Tier 5	IV Divisioona (Fourth Division)	Group 1	Finnish FA(Suomen Palloliitto)	2nd	Promotion rematch - Promoted
1978	Tier 4	III Divisioona (Third Division)	Group 2	Finnish FA (Suomen Pallolitto)	4th	
1979	Tier 4	III Divisioona (Third Division)	Group 2	Finnish FA (Suomen Pallolitto)	7th	
1980	Tier 4	III Divisioona (Third Division)	Group 2	Finnish FA (Suomen Pallolitto)	4th	
1981	Tier 4	III Divisioona (Third Division)	Group 2	Finnish FA (Suomen Pallolitto)	9th	
1982	Tier 4	III Divisioona (Third Division)	Group 2	Finnish FA (Suomen Pallolitto)	8th	
1983	Tier 4	III Divisioona (Third Division)	Group 2	Finnish FA (Suomen Pallolitto)	8th	
1984	Tier 4	III Divisioona (Third Division)	Group 2	Finnish FA (Suomen Pallolitto)	8th	
1985	Tier 4	III Divisioona (Third Division)	Group 2	Finnish FA (Suomen Pallolitto)	11th	Relegated
1986	Tier 5	IV Divisioona (Fourth Division)	Group 3	Finnish FA(Suomen Palloliitto)	7th	
1987	Tier 5	IV Divisioona (Fourth Division)				
1988	Tier 5	IV Divisioona (Fourth Division)	Helsinki & Uusimaa			
1989	Tier 5	IV Divisioona (Fourth Division)				Promoted
1990	Tier 4	III Divisioona (Third Division)	Group 2	Finnish FA (Suomen Pallolitto)	5th	
1991	Tier 4	III Divisioona (Third Division)	Group 2	Finnish FA (Suomen Pallolitto)	8th	
1992	Tier 4	III Divisioona (Third Division)	Group 2	Finnish FA (Suomen Pallolitto)	12th	Relegated
1993	Tier 5	Nelonen (Fourth Division)	Group 3	Uusimaa District (SPL Uusimaa)	11th	Relegated
1994	Tier 6	Vitonen (Fifth Division)				
1995	Tier 6	Vitonen (Fifth Division)				Promoted
1996	Tier 5	Nelonen (Fourth Division)	Group 3	Uusimaa District (SPL Uusimaa)	10th	
1997	Tier 5	Nelonen (Fourth Division)	Group 1	Uusimaa District (SPL Uusimaa)	6th	
1998	Tier 5	Nelonen (Fourth Division)	Group 1	Uusimaa District (SPL Uusimaa)		
1999	Tier 5	Nelonen (Fourth Division)	Group 1	Uusimaa District (SPL Uusimaa)	5th	
2000	Tier 5	Nelonen (Fourth Division)	Section 1	Uusimaa District (SPL Uusimaa)	8th	
2001	Tier 5	Nelonen (Fourth Division)	Section 1	Uusimaa District (SPL Uusimaa)	1st	Promoted
2002	Tier 4	Kolmonen (Third Division)	Section 1	Helsinki & Uusimaa (SPL Uusimaa)	9th	
2003	Tier 4	Kolmonen (Third Division)	Section 1	Helsinki & Uusimaa (SPL Uusimaa)	10th	
2004	Tier 4	Kolmonen (Third Division)	Section 1	Helsinki & Uusimaa (SPL Uusimaa)	11th	Relegated
2005	Tier 5	Nelonen (Fourth Division)	Section 1	Uusimaa District (SPL Uusimaa)	1st	Promoted
2006	Tier 4	Kolmonen (Third Division)	Section 1	Helsinki & Uusimaa (SPL Uusimaa)	7th	
2007	Tier 4	Kolmonen (Third Division)	Section 1	Helsinki & Uusimaa (SPL Uusimaa)	1st	Play-offs
2008	Tier 4	Kolmonen (Third Division)	Section 1	Helsinki & Uusimaa (SPL Uusimaa)	2nd	
2009	Tier 4	Kolmonen (Third Division)	Section 1	Helsinki & Uusimaa (SPL Uusimaa)	1st	Promoted
2010	Tier 3	Kakkonen (Second Division)	Group B	Finnish FA (Suomen Pallolitto)	8th	
2011	Tier 3	Kakkonen (Second Division)	Group B	Finnish FA (Suomen Pallolitto)	1st	Play-offs
2012	Tier 3	Kakkonen (Second Division)	South Group	Finnish FA (Suomen Pallolitto)	2nd	
2013	Tier 3	Kakkonen (Second Division)	South Group	Finnish FA (Suomen Pallolitto)	4th	
2014	Tier 3	Kakkonen (Second Division)	South Group	Finnish FA (Suomen Pallolitto)	3rd	
2015	Tier 3	Kakkonen (Second Division)	West Group	Finnish FA (Suomen Pallolitto)	5th	
2016	Tier 3	Kakkonen (Second Division)	Group B	Finnish FA (Suomen Pallolitto)	3rd	
2017	Tier 3	Kakkonen (Second Division)	Group B	Finnish FA (Suomen Pallolitto)	4th	
2018	Tier 3	Kakkonen (Second Division)	Group B	Finnish FA (Suomen Pallolitto)	12th	Relegated
2019	Tier 4	Kolmonen (Third Division)	Group 1	Helsinki & Uusimaa (SPL Uusimaa)	8th	

- 4 seasons in Suomensarja
- 31 seasons in Kakkonen
- 21 seasons in Kolmonen
- 15 seasons in Nelonen
- 2 seasons in Vitonen

== Club structure ==
BK-46 runs a number of teams, including 2 men's teams, 8 boys' teams and 1 girls' team.

== 2010 season ==
BK-46 are competing in Group B (Lohko B) of the Kakkonen administered by the Football Association of Finland (Suomen Palloliitto). This is the third highest tier in the Finnish football system. In 2009, Bollklubben-46 finished in first position in Section 1 of the Kolmonen and were promoted to the Kakkonen.

BK-46 NK02 are participating in Section 1 (Lohko 1) of the Vitonen administered by the Uusimaa SPL.
