= 2003 Finnish Cup =

2003 Suomen Cup
Tournament details
- Country: Finland
- Teams: 338

The 2003 Finnish Cup (Finnish: Suomen Cup) was the 49th season of the main annual association football cup competition in Finland. It was organised as a single-elimination knock–out tournament and participation in the competition was voluntary. A total of 338 teams registered for the competition. The final was held at the Finnair Stadium, Helsinki on 1 November 2003 with HJK defeating AC Allianssi by 2–1, (after extra time), before an attendance of 3,682 spectators.

== Teams ==
Round	Clubs remaining	Clubs involved	Winners from previous round	New entries this round	Leagues entering at this round
Round 1	338	280	none	280	Kolmonen (Tier 4); Nelonen (Tier 5); Vitonen (Tier 6); Kutonen (Tier 7); Seiska (Tier 8); Others (including Veterans and Youth)
Round 2	198	140	140	none	none
Round 3	128	128	70	58	Kakkonen (Tier 3); Ykkönen (Tier 2); Veikkausliiga (Tier 1)
Round 4	64	64	64	none	none
Round 5	32	32	32	none	none
Round 6	16	16	16	none	none
Quarter-finals	8	8	8	none	none
Semi-finals	4	4	4	none	none
Final	2	2	2	none	none

== Round 1 ==
Tie no	Home team	Score	Away team	Information
1	HooGee 1	4-2	Jokelan Kisa	
2	FC Dal	1-4	Gnistan A	
3	KP-75	2-0	PETO	
4	FC Boca	2-5	Naseva	
5	Team Grani	0-2	GrIFK	
6	Nopsa	3-4	FC Futura 2	
7	FC HaNa	3-2 (aet)	City Stars	
8	Kuninkaat	3-0	Apollo	Apollo withdrew
9	Geishan Pallo 2	1-7	KOPSE	
10	PK-50	5-0	OT-77 1	
11	VeVe	1-3	FC POHU 1	
12	PK-50 JKKI	5-1	FC Degis	
13	FC Pakila	0-10	LoPa	
14	SumU 2	0-1	Kelohonka	
15	PK-35 2	0-7	MPS	
16	PPJ	1-2	LePa	
17	SibboV	3-2	Geishan Pallo 1	
18	NuPS	12-0	Ojy	
19	OPedot 2	2-1	VJS A	
20	LePo	2-3	KaPa-80	
21	FC Itä-Vantaa	1-3	HDS	
22	Gnistan 2	9-2	FC HaNa 2	
23	Espoon Tikka	2-10	OT-77 2	
24	SUPS	0-5	HooGee A	
25	Vantaan Klubi	0-3	Zyklon	Vantaan Klubi withdrew
26	RiRa	4-5	FC POHU 2	
27	PuPo FC	4-0	FC IKHTYS	
28	JJ VEPO	2-3	RoU	
29	Zenith	2-3	Ponnistajat	
30	KäPa PuLe	19-0	FC Kyllikki	
31	FC Lohja JKKI	0-5	EsPa	
32	HooGee 2	1-3	EsPa A	
33	NouLa	2-3	Pöxyt A	
34	FC POHU Simps.	0-6	RIlves	
35	KKP	5-2	FC Homer	
36	OPedot JKKI	0-5	VJS	
37	Biisonit	2-1	EBK	
38	Inter L-vaara	0-9	FC Ogeli	
39	FC Lohja	3-1	FC Rankki -85	
40	PH-99	0-10	PuiU	
41	FC Dogs	0-3	VALO	FC Dogs withdrew
42	SuxiBoxit	2-3	TiPS	
43	PPV 2	5-2	FC POHU A	
44	HPS	0-4	JäPS	
45	MaKu	1-3	HEK	
46	KP-75 2	2-11	FC Honka A	
47	Nateva 2	0-9	PMPS	
48	PMPS 2	2-10	Pöxyt	
49	I-HJ 2	0-2	FC Kuusysi A	
50	ToTe	0-5	HJK A	
51	FC POHU Siperia	0-16	SUMU 1	
52	HeKuLa	0-13	FC Reipas A	
53	K-UP	0-5	PK-35 A	
54	HP-47 1	2-6	Rakuunat 2	
55	VoPK	1-0	Edustus-STPS	
56	PURHA	3-0	RPS	
57	StU	3-1	ViSa	
58	FC Villisiat	5-0	Jäntevä	
59	MoNsa	1-2	FC KooTeePee	
60	FC Loviisa	1-7	FC KooTeePee A	
61	HiHa	5-2	MP JKKI	
62	RiPa	3-0	Atomit	Atomit withdrew
63	BUTA JKKI	5-1	HP-47 2	
64	KaiKa	0-15	MyPa A	
65	PoPo	4-0	FC PotkuPallo	
66	PEPO	4-0	Oviesti	
67	KPonsi	1-3	VKajo	
68	KYritys	0-2	FC PaSa	
69	AC Barca	3-4 (aet)	SiPS 1	
70	Riverball	0-8	SaPa	

Tie no	Home team	Score	Away team	Information
71	NP-H	1-3	LehPa-77	
72	PAVE	0-4	JoPS|	
73	SiPS 2	0-3	KuPS A	SiPS 2 withdrew
74	VP-H	4-5 (aet)	SC Zulimanit	
75	AFC Keltik	0-4	SuPa	
76	KarTe	0- 13	JIPPO A	
77	JuPS	0-2	Warkaus JK 2	
78	ToPS-90	3-2 (aet)	JuPy	
79	RautU	1-5	MPR	
80	Huima 2	0-2	KanPa	
81	PetPet	0-3	VJK	PetPet withdrew
82	HPP	0-1 (aet)	KonnU	
83	HuKi	4-1	KeuPa	
84	Huima 1	3-0	PPK	
85	Souls AC	0-2	FC Saarijärvi	
86	LaPro	3-2	AC Er-Pa	
87	FC Ayshires	2-5	Mäntän Valo	
88	PJK	1-2	TKT 1	
89	Pato 2	0-3	Härmä	
90	TamFu	1-6	ViiPV	
91	OTuisku	1-4	KooVee	
92	PP-70 2	5-2	HJS A	
93	ErHu	6-2	LaVe	
94	SorPa	0-7	FC Haka A	
95	Pato 1	1-2	S-Ilves	
96	JK Mylly	0-5	NoPS	
97	FC Polla 2	1-4	CST	
98	FC Kivitasku	0-7	ToiP-49	
99	TKT 2	1-2	TP-T	
100	NoPy	3-	YRyhti	
101	KaVo	2-3	Loiske	
102	KylVe	0-7	FC Ilves A	
103	FC Tykit	0-3	FC NU	FC Tykit withdrew
104	FC Turku -82	0-8	PiPS	
105	AFC Campus	0-9	FC Boda	
106	FC Bosna	2-4	IFK Mariehamn JKKI	
107	LTU 1	0-6	ÅIFK	
108	KaaPo 3	1-3	UPK 2	
109	RaiFu	0-3	UPK 1	
110	Veijarit	1-8	TuTo	
111	MynPa-52	3-2	FC Inter A	
112	LoiPS	0-12	JyTy	
113	PiTU	0-9	FC Jazz A	
114	IMahti	0-3	HNS	
115	LuVe	0-8	ToVe	
116	FC Eurajoki	0-7	KaPa	
117	FC Jazz JKKI	0-3	Nakkilan Nasta	
118	RuoVi	3- 2 (aet)	MuSa 2	
119	Jurva-70	3-5	Sisu	
120	VäVi	4-2	TePa	
121	FC Kuffen	4-3 (aet)	Sepsi-78	
122	FC Kiisto 2	4-1	NFF 2	
123	KuRy	0-5	IK	
124	VIFK JKKI	0-10	NFF 1	
125	SO-TI	3-12	FC Järviseutu	
126	OuHu	1-5	LoVe	
127	FC YPA 2	1-2	IK Myran	
128	Ura	0-8	Ps Into	
129	LBK	1-0 (aet)	KPV-j A	
130	FC Kanuunat	2-4	OuTa	
131	FC Nets	0-6	FC Dreeverit	
132	RoPS A	4-2	OLS A	
133	FC Kurenpojat 2	1-8	Rovaniemi Utd	
134	AS Moon	1-2	JS Hercules	
135	HauPa	3-0	PasPa	PasPa withdrew
136	KemPa-77	1-5	KPT-85 A	
137	FC 88	4-1	FC Rio Grande	
138	FC Raahe	0-2	FC Kurenpojat	
139	FCFC Oulu	1-0	KulPa	
140	OuJK	0-5	EuPa	

== Round 2 ==
Tie no	Home team	Score	Away team	Information
141	SibboV	1-3	KooTeePee A	
142	RoU	8-1	Pöxyt A	
143	PK-50 JKKI	4-1	KaPa-80	
144	VALO	1-5	VJS	
145	HEK	2-3	FC Futura 2	
146	MPS	4-0	HooGee A	
147	FC Lohja	1-4	Naseva	
148	FC Kuusysi A	2-3 (aet)	FC Reipas A	
149	Gnistan 2	1-2	FC Ogeli	
150	Kuninkaat	3-8	Kelohonka	
151	KP-75	1-0	NuPS	
152	OPedot 2	3-0	KäPa PuLe	
153	SUMU 1	6-0	LePa	
154	HooGee 1	0-9	FC HaNa	
155	PPV 2	2-1	EsPa A	
156	PuPo FC	0-3	PK-35 A	
157	HDS	2-1	KOPSE	
158	FC POHU 2	1-5	Gnistan A	
159	Biisonit	0-4	PMPS	
160	PK-50	0-4	HJK A	
161	Espoon Tikka	1-1; 4-3(p.)	KKP	
162	JäPS	3-1	GrIFK	
163	LoPa	1-0	EsPa	
164	Zyklon	0-1	Pöxyt	
165	Ponnistajat	0-5	FC POHU 1	
166	PuiU	2-1	FC Honka A	
167	RIlves	1-1; 3-4(p.)	TiPS	
168	FC Villisiat	0-2	VKajo	
169	BUTA JKKI	0-8	FC PaSa	
170	PURHA	3-0	RiPa	
171	StU	0-5	PEPO	
172	VoPK	3-1	Rakuunat 2	
173	HiHa	1-2 (aet)	PoPo	
174	MyPa A	1-3	FC KooTeePee	
175	JS Hercules	0-1 (aet)	SiPS 1	

Tie no	Home team	Score	Away team	Information
176	SuPa	2-3	MPR	
177	JoPS	3-4	JIPPO A	
178	SC Zulimanit	2-1	SaPa	
179	ToPS-90	1-2	KuPS A	
180	Warkaus JK 2	0-5	LehPa-77	
181	KooVee	2-6	EuPa	
182	FC Saarijärvi	1-4	VJK	
183	KonnU	2-0	KanPa	
184	HuKi	3-0	Huima 1	
185	PP-70 2	3-1	CST	
186	TP-T	0-5	TKT 1	
187	LaPro	0-13	S-Ilves	
188	ViiPV	4-2	FC Ilves A	
189	NoPy	0-3	FC Haka A	
190	Loiske	2-0	Härmä	
191	ErHu	5-1	Mäntän Valo	
192	NoPS	0-2	ToiP-49	
193	IFK Mariehamn JKKI	1-2	TuTo	
194	FC NU	2-3	UPK 1	
195	UPK 2	0-4	JyTy	
196	PiPS	1-3	ÅIFK	
197	MynPa-52	0-5	FC Boda	
198	RuoVi	3-1	IK	
199	KanPa	0-1	Rovaniemi Utd	
200	FC Jazz A	4-0	Nakkilan Nasta	
201	ToVe	5-0	HNS	
202	Sisu	0-2	NFF 1	
203	FC Kuffen	2-1 (aet)	FC Järviseutu	
204	FC Kiisto 2	1-2 (aet)	VäVi	
205	Ps Into	1-1; 2-4(p.)	LoVe	
206	IK Myran	0-2	LBK	
207	FC Dreeverit	2-0	KPT-85 A	
208	FC Kurenpojat	2-0	OuTa	
209	RoPS A	4-0	FC 88	
210	FCFC Oulu	0-3	HauPa	

== Round 3 ==
Tie no	Home team	Score	Away team	Information
211	VoPK	1-0	PK-35 A	
212	FC Futura 2	2-4	FC Futura	
213	PK-35	2-4	Rakuunat 1	
214	PPV 2	1-2 (aet)	AC Vantaa	
215	TiPS	0-5	FC Jokerit	
216	FC HaNa	5-1	Gnistan A	
217	SUMU 1	2-1	FC POHU 1	
218	KTP	1-2	KäPa	
219	Pöxyt	0-9	FC Honka	
220	PK-50 JKKI	0-9	FC Espoo	
221	PoPo	2-9	Gnistan 1	
222	RoU	0-1	FC Reipas A	
223	Pantterit	0-6	FC Lahti	
224	VKajo	3-1	FC Ogeli	
225	LoPa	0-4	FC Viikingit	
226	PURHA	1-0	FC PaSa	
227	Naseva	0-6	AC Allianssi	
228	OPedot 2	1-3	Kelohonka	
229	HJK A	2-1 (aet)	Atlantis Akatemia	
230	KP-75	2-3	FCK Salamat	
231	PMPS	2-3	VJS	
232	PuiU	0-9	HJK	
233	HDS	0-5	FC KooTeePee	
234	Espoon Tikka	2-1	PEPO	
235	JäPS	1-0	MPS	
236	FC KooTeePee A	0-6	MyPa	
237	FC Haka A	0-5	TPS	
238	RuoVi	0-2	TPV	
239	FC Boda	0-5	FC Haka	
240	S-Ilves	0-2	ToiP-49	
241	ToVe	0-9	FC Hämeenlinna	
242	KaaPo	0-3	P-Iirot	
243	ErHu	1-6	PS-44	

Tie no	Home team	Score	Away team	Information
244	JyTy	1-3	FC Jazz	
245	TuTo	3-2	FC Jazz A	
246	PP-70 2	0-4	Tampere United	
247	Loiske	0-2	SalPa	
248	EuPa	0-11	FC Inter	
249	TKT 1	0-1	PP-70 1	
250	ÅIFK	2-0	PIF	
251	ViiPV	1-3	FC Rauma	
252	UPK 1	0-4	VG-62	
253	VäVi	0-6	FC YPA	
254	FC Kiisto	1-2	FF Jaro	
255	FC Kuffen	1-3	FC Korsholm	
256	VIFK	0-2	Närpes Kraft	
257	LBK	0-1 (aet)	JBK	
258	NFF 1	3-2	VPS	
259	TUS	2-4	KPV-j	
260	LoVe	2-2; 6-4(p.)	MuSa	
261	LehPa-77	2-5	Kings	
262	HuKi	0-2	MP	
263	VJK	0-8	SäyRi	
264	JJK	1-5	KuPS	
265	KonnU	0-0; 5-6(p.)	JIPPO	
266	KuPS A	5-1	MPR	
267	SiPS 1	1-3	SC Zulimanit	
268	JIPPO A	1-4	PK-37	
269	FC Kurenpojat	2-4	OLS	
270	HauPa	2-1 (aet)	FC Dreeverit	
271	KajHa	0-6	RoPS	
272	PS Kemi	2-3	TP-47	
273	RoPS A	0-3	Tervarit	
274	Rovaniemi Utd	1-2	AC Oulu	

== Round 4 ==
Tie no	Home team	Score	Away team	Information
275	FC Espoo	2-0	SalPa	
276	Espoon Tikka	0-6	FCK Salamat	
277	JäPS	3-1	SUMU 1	
278	PS-44	0-4	FC Haka	
279	TuTo	3-1	Kelohonka	
280	P-Iirot	0-3	TPS	
281	FC Jazz	2-1 (aet)	FC Jokerit	
282	VKajo	1-2	TPV	
283	Rakuunat 1	1-3	HJK	
284	VoPK	0-1 (aet)	ÅIFK	
285	FC Reipas A	0-3	FC Hämeenlinna	
286	KäPa	1-0	FC Lahti	
287	PP-70 1	1-2	FC KooTeePee	
288	Gnistan 1	2-5	FC Viikingit	
289	FC Honka	0-2	AC Allianssi	
290	VJS	0-3	FC Rauma	

Tie no	Home team	Score	Away team	Information
291	HJK A	1-5	MyPa	
292	VG-62	0-6	FC Inter	
293	FC HaNa	2-1	ToiP-49	
294	PURHA	0-3	FC Futura	
295	AC Vantaa	0-3	Tampere United	
296	MP	0-1	TP-47	
297	JIPPO	0-1	RoPS	
298	SC Zulimanit	3-2 (aet)	PK-37	
299	FC YPA	3-1	Tervarit	
300	HauPa	2-0	JBK	
301	SäyRi	1-3	AC Oulu	
302	FC Korsholm	0-3	FF Jaro	
303	OLS	3-4 (aet)	Närpes Kraft	
304	KPV-j	1-2	KuPS	
305	KuPS A	4-1	LoVe	
306	NFF 1	0-5	Kings	

== Round 5 ==
Tie no	Home team	Score	Away team	Information
307	HauPa	1-4	FC Espoo	
308	HJK	3-2 (aet)	FC Haka	
309	TPV	0-4	KuPS	
310	FC Rauma	1-3	Närpes Kraft	
311	KuPS A	2-3 (aet)	FC Inter	
312	AC Oulu	1-3	FC Viikingit	
313	Kings	1-2 (aet)	Tampere United	
314	FC Jazz	1-2	AC Allianssi	

Tie no	Home team	Score	Away team	Information
315	TuTo	0-3	FC Hämeenlinna	
316	FC YPA	0-4	RoPS	
317	FCK Salamat	2-1	KäPa	
318	TPS	0-2	MyPa	
319	FC HaNa	0-10	FF Jaro	
320	SC Zulimanit	0-3	TP-47	
321	JäPS	2-1	ÅIFK	
322	FC Futura	1-1; 5-6 (p.)	FC KooTeePee	

== Round 6 ==
Tie no	Home team	Score	Away team	Information
323	FC Hämeenlinna	2-0	KuPS	
324	FC KooTeePee	2-0	Närpes Kraft	
325	FCK Salamat	0-2	MyPa	
326	HJK	6-3	FC Viikingit	

Tie no	Home team	Score	Away team	Information
327	FC Espoo	0-4	FC Inter	
328	JäPS	0-3	FF Jaro	
329	Tampere United	3-1	RoPS	
330	TP-47	1-2 (aet)	AC Allianssi	

== Quarter-finals ==
Tie no	Home team	Score	Away team	Information
331	FF Jaro	1-2	AC Allianssi	
332	HJK	1-1; 9-8 (p.)	FC Inter	

Tie no	Home team	Score	Away team	Information
333	MyPa	0-2	Tampere United	
334	FC KooTeePee	5-1	FC Hämeenlinna	

== Semi-finals ==
Tie no	Home team	Score	Away team	Information
335	HJK	1-1; 4-2 (p.)	FC KooTeePee	

Tie no	Home team	Score	Away team	Information
336	Tampere United	2-3 (aet)	AC Allianssi	

== Final ==
Tie no	Team 1	Score	Team 2	Information
337	HJK	2–1 (aet)	AC Allianssi	Att. 3,682
