= 2002 Finnish Cup =

2002 Suomen Cup
Tournament details
- Country: Finland
- Teams: 294

The 2002 Finnish Cup (Finnish: Suomen Cup) was the 48th season of the main annual association football cup competition in Finland. It was organised as a single-elimination knock–out tournament and participation in the competition was voluntary. A total of 294 teams registered for the competition. The final was held at the Finnair Stadium, Helsinki on 9 November 2002 with FC Haka defeating FC Lahti by 4-1 before an attendance of 2,984 spectators.

== Teams ==
| Round | Clubs remaining | Clubs involved | Winners from previous round | New entries this round | Leagues entering at this round |
|---|---|---|---|---|---|
| Round 1 | 294 | 78 | none | 78 | Kolmonen (Tier 4); Nelonen (Tier 5); Vitonen (Tier 6); Kutonen (Tier 7); Seiska (Tier 8); Others (including Veterans and Youth) |
| Round 2 | 255 | 196 | 39 | 157 | see above |
| Round 3 | 157 | 98 | 98 | none | none |
| Round 4 | 108 | 96 | 49 | 47 | Kakkonen (Tier 3); Ykkönen (Tier 2) |
| Round 5 | 60 | 56 | 48 | 8 | Veikkausliiga (Tier 1) - 8 teams |
| Round 6 | 32 | 32 | 28 | 4 | Veikkausliiga (Tier 1) - 4 teams |
| Round 7 | 16 | 16 | 16 | none | none |
| Quarter-finals | 8 | 8 | 8 | none | none |
| Semi-finals | 4 | 4 | 4 | none | none |
| Final | 2 | 2 | 2 | none | none |

== Round 1 ==
| Tie no | Home team | Score | Away team | Information |
|---|---|---|---|---|
| 1 | HEK | 3-4 | Zyklon | |
| 2 | FC Dal | 0-7 | HJK A | |
| 3 | JJ VEPO | 0-2 | PPV | |
| 4 | AC Arctic | 4-1 | Kuninkaat | |
| 5 | Arsenal | 4-2 (aet) | PPJ | |
| 6 | HDS 2 | 0-3 | PETO | |
| 7 | Valo | 3-1 | FC Pathoven | |
| 8 | OJy | 0-6 | FC Näädät | |
| 9 | HaNa | 1-4 | PuPo FC | |
| 10 | HooGee A | 0-2 | EsPa | |
| 11 | K-UP | 4-0 | IIF | |
| 12 | TiPS | 3-0 | SibboV | |
| 13 | PK-50 JKKI-35 | 2-6 | KKP | |
| 14 | LePa | 0-1 | LoPa A | |
| 15 | PMP EJ | 1-3 | EBK | |
| 16 | JyTy | 3-2 (aet) | UPK | |
| 17 | LTU | 0-1 | Veijarit | |
| 18 | Ponteva | 1-4 | TPK A | |
| 19 | ToVe | 1-2 | ValKu | |
| 20 | KAPA | 4-1 | Nasta | |

| Tie no | Home team | Score | Away team | Information |
|---|---|---|---|---|
| 21 | FC Järviseutu | 7-1 | Jurva-70 | |
| 22 | KuRy | 1-8 | NFF | |
| 23 | IK | 4-0 | FC Sport | |
| 24 | Myran | 2-3 | LBK | |
| 25 | K-Pallo | 1-3 | OuHu | |
| 26 | LaPro | 1-6 | VaKP | |
| 27 | FC Kuiva | 0-3 | KooVee | FC Kuiva withdrew |
| 28 | FC Kavo | 1-7 | Pato | |
| 29 | NePa | 0-18 | Ilves A | |
| 30 | LauTP | 2-0 | MyPa A | |
| 31 | PePo 2 | 0-2 | KaiKa | |
| 32 | LuPo | 0-13 | Rakuunat 2 | |
| 33 | LIK | 2-8 | UTA JKKI-35 | |
| 34 | SiPS 2 | 0-1 | Zulimanit | |
| 35 | JuPS | 0-3 | LehPa | |
| 36 | FC Vaajakoski | 1-1; 10-11 (p.) | Huima | |
| 37 | HauPa | 4-1 | Rovaniemi Utd | |
| 38 | PaTe | 0-18 | OLS A | |
| 39 | AS Moon | 0-10 | OuTa | |

== Round 2 ==
| Tie no | Home team | Score | Away team | Information |
|---|---|---|---|---|
| 40 | SUMU | 7-1 | FC POHU Siperia | |
| 41 | FC Pakila 2 | 1-2 | FC POHU Simp. | |
| 42 | Trikiinit | 0-16 | LPS | |
| 43 | FC Pakila 1 | 1-3 | FC POHU 2 | |
| 44 | HDS 1 | 1-3 | Team KäPa | |
| 45 | MaKu | 4-0 | TOTE avauspotku | |
| 46 | LPS 2 | 1-1; 4-2 (p.) | HeKuLa | |
| 47 | Arsenal | 0-8 | PPV | |
| 48 | PETO | 1-1; 1-6 (p.) | HJK A | |
| 49 | FC POHU 1 | 1-2 | PuiU | |
| 50 | Ogeli | 2-1 | RoU | |
| 51 | Zyklon | 1-4 (aet) | PK-35 A | |
| 52 | Ajaks | 1-8 | AC Arctic | |
| 53 | Zenith | 1-2 | Gnistan 2 | |
| 54 | HIFK 2 | 10-0 | OT-77 | |
| 55 | RePa-93 | 1-7 | FC Reipas A | |
| 56 | RiRa | 4-3 (aet) | VeVe 2 | |
| 57 | FC Pelimiehet | 1-0 (aet) | RIlves | |
| 58 | FC Näädät | 0-16 | Kelohonka | |
| 59 | FC Honka 2 | 0-1 | PuPo FC | |
| 60 | KKP | 1-6 | TuPS | |
| 61 | FC Lohja 1 | 0-5 | FC HIK | |
| 62 | EsPa | 4-3 | KOPSE | |
| 63 | HooGee 1 | 1-6 | BK-46 | |
| 64 | EBK | 1-3 | LoPa | |
| 65 | KasvU 2 | 2-11 | PK-50 | |
| 66 | Pedot | 1-2 | LePo | |
| 67 | HooGee 2 | 3-3; 3-4 (p.) | VJS JKKI-35 | |
| 68 | FC Lohja JKKI-35 | 0-7 | FC Honka A | |
| 69 | KarlU | 1-2 | Sexypöxyt | |
| 70 | FCK | 1-2 | NuPS | |
| 71 | TiPS | 1-5 | City Stars | |
| 72 | K-UP | 0-6 | KP-75 | |
| 73 | VALO | 1-4 | Kuusysi A | |
| 74 | FC LP | 1-7 | GrIFK | |
| 75 | HaKi | 0-4 | Suxiboxit | |
| 76 | TuTo | 5-5; 5-4 (p.) | KaaPo 2 | |
| 77 | FC NU | 1-2 | JyTy | |
| 78 | RaiFu | 2-1 | UPK 2 | |
| 79 | PiPS | 2-0 | ÅIFK | |
| 80 | Veijarit | 0-6 | Inter A | |
| 81 | TPK A | 2-1 (aet) | SCR | |
| 82 | FC Dynamo | 0-2 | KylVe | |
| 83 | FC Jazz JKKI-35 | 5-2 | MuSa A | |
| 84 | KaPa | 3-2 | FC Jazz A | |
| 85 | FC Eurajoki | 1-4 | EuPa | |
| 86 | ValKu | 2-1 | KKV | |
| 87 | Sinipaidat | 1-6 | IK | |
| 88 | So-Ti | 0-4 | FC Järviseutu | |

| Tie no | Home team | Score | Away team | Information |
|---|---|---|---|---|
| 89 | FC TeTe | 0-2 | APV | |
| 90 | VäVi | 0-5 | SIF | |
| 91 | KorKo | 2-6 | NFF | |
| 92 | FC YPA 2 | 4-2 | Jymy | |
| 93 | LoVe | 0-4 | KPV A | |
| 94 | PS Into | 2-1 | LBK | |
| 95 | KPS | 1-1; 8-7 (p.) | FC YPA 1 | |
| 96 | KP-V | 2-4 | OuHu | |
| 97 | FC Teivo | 0-5 | Pato | |
| 98 | FC SorPa | 2-3 (aet) | ToiP-49 | |
| 99 | LaVe | 3-0 | CST | |
| 100 | PJK | 1-2 | FC Haka A | |
| 101 | FC Polla 2 | 1-4 | TKT | |
| 102 | VaPS JP | 4-0 | Loiske | |
| 103 | VaKP | 8-1 | FC Gepardi | |
| 104 | ErHu | 3-1 | KooVee | |
| 105 | PP-70 2 | 0-7 | S Ilves | |
| 106 | Ilves A | 1-2 (aet) | NoPS | |
| 107 | Daltonit | 0-5 | JIlves | |
| 108 | BET | 1-4 | Konnu | |
| 109 | Huima | 4-0 | LPK | |
| 110 | PPK | 0-4 | PaRi | |
| 111 | MP JKKI-35 | 6-0 | KaiKa | |
| 112 | FC MyPa-86 | 1-1; 0-3 (p.) | K Yritys | |
| 113 | KoF | 12-1 | K Ponsi | |
| 114 | RiPa | 1-2 (aet) | KTP | |
| 115 | HaPK | 2-1 | STPS | |
| 116 | ViSa | 0-6 | FC PASA | |
| 117 | HiHi | 0-3 | KTP A | |
| 118 | LauTP | 3-2 | UTA JKKI-35 | |
| 119 | Viesti | 7-0 | MäJä | |
| 120 | PoPo | 2-9 | PEPO 1 | |
| 121 | Rakuunat 2 | 4-1 | V Kajo | |
| 122 | HiHa | 3-0 | SuPa-52 | |
| 123 | MPR | 6-0 | KarTe | |
| 124 | LehPa | 4-1 | NP-H | |
| 125 | JuPy | 0-3 | PaVe | |
| 126 | KuPS A | 3-3; 2-4 (p.) | SiPS | |
| 127 | SC KuFu-98 | 3-2 (aet) | JoPS | |
| 128 | Yllätys | 0-3 | Zulimanit | |
| 129 | ArPS | 1-2 | Tervarit 2 | |
| 130 | OLS A | 1-1; 5-4 (p.) | OuJK | |
| 131 | KulPa | 1-4 | FC Dreeverit | |
| 132 | KPT-85 A | 0-3 | FC Rio Grande | |
| 133 | Pe-Po | 1-2 | OuRe | |
| 134 | OuTa | 2-1 | FC Raahe | |
| 135 | FC Kanuunat | 3-1 | Tervarit A | |
| 136 | HauPa | 1-3 | FC Kurenpojat JS | |
| 137 | Hercules | 5-0 | PaPa | |

== Round 3 ==
| Tie no | Home team | Score | Away team | Information |
|---|---|---|---|---|
| 138 | PK-35 A | 5-2 | FC HIK | |
| 139 | LoPa | 1-3 | Sexypöxyt | |
| 140 | FC Reipas A | 3-2 | Team KäPa | |
| 141 | LPS 2 | 0-2 | PuiU | |
| 142 | Kuusysi A | 1-2 | KP-75 | |
| 143 | FC POHU Simp. | 0-3 | FC Pelimiehet | |
| 144 | LePo | 1-7 | Kelohonka | |
| 145 | HIFK 2 | 1-4 | NuPS | |
| 146 | RiRa | 1-6 | LPS | |
| 147 | City Stars | 2-4 | EsPa | |
| 148 | PuPo FC | 1-2 | HJK A | |
| 149 | SUMU | 2-0 | Gnistan 2 | |
| 150 | Suxiboxit | 8-5 | PK-50 | |
| 151 | Ogeli | 1-0 | BK-46 | |
| 152 | FC POHU 2 | 0-3 | TuPS | |
| 153 | VJS JKKI-35 | 0-3 | MaKu | |
| 154 | AC Arctic | 1-19 | PPV | |
| 155 | FC Honka A | 0-1 | GrIFK | |
| 156 | J Ilves | 0-2 | FC Haka A | |
| 157 | KylVe | 8-0 | FC Jazz JKKI-35 | |
| 158 | LaVe | 1-2 | TuTo | |
| 159 | VaPS JP | 3-2 | ErHu | |
| 160 | RaiFu | 0-10 | Inter A | |
| 161 | Pato | 3-2 (aet) | EuPa | |
| 162 | S Ilves | 4-1 | TPK A | |

| Tie no | Home team | Score | Away team | Information |
|---|---|---|---|---|
| 163 | JyTy | 1-2 | PiPS | |
| 164 | KaPa | 1-3 | ValKu | |
| 165 | ToiP-49 | 1-0 | NoPS | |
| 166 | VaKP | 1-3 | TKT | |
| 167 | APV | 3-1 | NFF | |
| 168 | PaRi | 3-1 | IK | |
| 169 | KPS | 1-5 | SIF | |
| 170 | FC Järviseutu | 2-1 (aet) | FC YPA 2 | |
| 171 | PS Into | 0-1 | OuHu | |
| 172 | Konnu | 0-5 | SiPS | |
| 173 | K Yritys | 1-3 | KTP A | |
| 174 | PePo 1 | 2-1 | MP JKKI-35 | |
| 175 | Huima | 4-4; 8-7 (p.) | Rakuunat 2 | |
| 176 | KTP | 2-4 | Viesti | |
| 177 | KoF | 0-11 | FC PASA | |
| 178 | LauTP | 3-2 (aet) | HaPK | |
| 179 | OuRe | 0-5 | KPV A | |
| 180 | HiHa | 0-5 | SC KuFu-98 | |
| 181 | Zulimanit | 4-1 | MPR | |
| 182 | PaVe | 3-0 | LehPa | |
| 183 | Tervarit 2 | 4-1 | OuTa | |
| 184 | OLS A | 8-1 | FC Kanuunat | |
| 185 | JS Hercules | 0-1 | FC Dreeverit | |
| 186 | FC Kurenpojat JS | 1-2 | FC Rio Grande | |

== Round 4 ==
| Tie no | Home team | Score | Away team | Information |
|---|---|---|---|---|
| 187 | HyPS | 0-1 | Gnistan | |
| 188 | GrIFK | 1-0 | PK-35 A | |
| 189 | TuPS | 1-6 | KP-75 | |
| 190 | FC Espoo | 0-4 | PK-35 | |
| 191 | SUMU | 1-3 | FC Jokerit | |
| 192 | FC Futura | 2-5 | FC Honka | |
| 193 | PPV | 1-0 | EsPa | |
| 194 | Suxiboxit | 0-2 | KäPa | |
| 195 | LPS | 2-0 | NuPS | |
| 196 | FC Reipas A | 1-5 | Ponnistajat | |
| 197 | MaKu | 0-5 | HIFK | |
| 198 | FC Pelimiehet | 2-3 | HJK A | |
| 199 | EIF | 3-6 | TP-Lahti | |
| 200 | Kelohonka | 1-0 (aet) | FC Ogeli | |
| 201 | Sexypöxyt | 0-2 | AC Vantaa | |
| 202 | PuiU | 2-1 | Viikingit | |
| 203 | KaaPo 1 | 1-2 | FC Boda | |
| 204 | TPK | 1-5 | TPS | |
| 205 | ToiP-49 | 1-4 (aet) | PIF | |
| 206 | PiPS | 1-1; 3-2 (p.) | PoPa | |
| 207 | FJK | 0-2 | VG-62 | |
| 208 | S Ilves | 0-2 | TPV | |
| 209 | MuSa | 0-7 | PP-70 | |
| 210 | FC Haka A | 3-2 | TKT | |

| Tie no | Home team | Score | Away team | Information |
|---|---|---|---|---|
| 211 | KylVe | 2-6 | TuTo | |
| 212 | ValKu | 1-4 | FC Rauma | |
| 213 | VaPS PJ | 1-4 | Inter Turku A | |
| 214 | Pato | 1-2 | PS-44 | |
| 215 | SiPS | 0-2 | Pallohait | |
| 216 | Viesti | 1-2 | PaVe | |
| 217 | Zulimanit | 2-0 | JJK | |
| 218 | FC PASA | 0-3 | Rakuunat 1 | |
| 219 | Huima | 0-6 | JIPPO | |
| 220 | KTP A | 0-8 | KooTeePee | |
| 221 | LauTP | 0-4 | Kings | |
| 222 | PePo 1 | 4-1 | SavU | |
| 223 | SC KuFu-98 | 1-2 | PK-37 | |
| 224 | APV | 4-1 | FC Järviseutu | |
| 225 | Öja-73 | 1-3 | KPV-j | |
| 226 | OuHu | 0-2 | TP-Seinäjoki | |
| 227 | JBK | 0-1 | FC Korsholm | |
| 228 | PaRi | 1-2 (aet) | SIF | |
| 229 | Karhu | 0-1 (aet) | TUS | |
| 230 | Tervarit 2 | 3-2 | KaPa | |
| 231 | FC Dreeverit | 0-5 | RoPS | |
| 232 | KPV A | 1-3 (aet) | TP-47 | |
| 233 | PS-Kemi Kings | 0-2 | Tervarit | |
| 234 | FC Rio Grande | 2-1 | OLS A | |

== Round 5 ==
| Tie no | Home team | Score | Away team | Information |
|---|---|---|---|---|
| 235 | FC Boda | 1-5 | FC Jazz | |
| 236 | TPV | 0-4 | Inter Turku | |
| 237 | PPV | 3-5 (aet) | Gnistan | |
| 238 | PK-35 | 0-1 | KäPa | |
| 239 | FC Haka A | 0-2 | AC Vantaa | |
| 240 | Kelohonka | 1-0 | PIF | |
| 241 | PP-70 | 1-2 | FC Hämeenlinna | |
| 242 | PiPS | 0-7 | TP-Lahti | |
| 243 | FC Honka | 2-0 | HIFK | |
| 244 | LPS | 2-0 | GrIFK | |
| 245 | VG-62 | 1-1; 6-4 (p.) | FC Jokerit | |
| 246 | PuiU | 1-2 | Ponnistajat | |
| 247 | TuTo | 0-3 | TPS | |
| 248 | PePo 1 | 4-0 | PS-44 | |

| Tie no | Home team | Score | Away team | Information |
|---|---|---|---|---|
| 249 | Rakuunat 1 | 2-3 | AC Allianssi | |
| 250 | Inter Turku A | 0-1 | FC Rauma | |
| 251 | FC KOOTEEPEE | 2-4 (aet) | FC Lahti | |
| 252 | HJK A | 5-1 | KP-75 | |
| 253 | Zulimanit | 0-4 | KuPS | |
| 254 | Tervarit 2 | 2-4 (aet) | TP-Seinäjoki | |
| 255 | KPV-j | 0-1 (aet) | VPS | |
| 256 | APV | 0-4 | JIPPO | |
| 257 | PaVe | 0-2 | FF Jaro | |
| 258 | RoPS | 4-2 | FC Korsholm | |
| 259 | PK-37 | 0-4 | TP-47 | |
| 260 | FC Rio Grande | 0-7 | Tervarit | |
| 261 | SIF | 1-9 | Kings | |
| 262 | Pallohait | 1-0 | TUS | |

== Round 6 ==
| Tie no | Home team | Score | Away team | Information |
|---|---|---|---|---|
| 263 | Kelohonka | 0-4 | AC Allianssi | |
| 264 | MyPa | 2-0 | KuPS | |
| 265 | Kings | 1-2 | Gnistan | |
| 266 | Ponnistajat | 2-5 | FF Jaro | |
| 267 | Tervarit | 0-1 | FC Inter | |
| 268 | HJK A | 2-1 | TP-Lahti | |
| 269 | PEPO 1 | 0-5 | FC Haka | |
| 270 | Pallohait | 1-8 | FC Lahti | |

| Tie no | Home team | Score | Away team | Information |
|---|---|---|---|---|
| 271 | JIPPO | 0-1 | TP-47 | |
| 272 | FC Hämeenlinna | 1-1; 4-2 (p.) | HJK | |
| 273 | TPS | 0-3 | Tampere United | |
| 274 | VG-62 | 2-1 | VPS | |
| 275 | FC Rauma | 0-6 | FC Honka | |
| 276 | LPS | 0-3 | AC Vantaa | |
| 277 | TP-Seinäjoki | 2-0 | FC Jazz | |
| 278 | KäPa | 0-2 | RoPS | |

== Round 7 ==
| Tie no | Home team | Score | Away team | Information |
|---|---|---|---|---|
| 279 | HJK A | 1-0 | Tampere United | |
| 280 | FF Jaro | 2-1 | FC Honka | |
| 281 | AC Vantaa | 0-2 | RoPS | |
| 282 | FC Lahti | 3-0 | TP-Seinäjoki | |

| Tie no | Home team | Score | Away team | Information |
|---|---|---|---|---|
| 283 | FC Haka | 2-1 | FC Inter | |
| 284 | AC Allianssi | 3-1 | TP-47 | |
| 285 | MyPa | 2-0 | VG-62 | |
| 286 | IF Gnistan | 1-0 | FC Hämeenlinna | |

== Quarter-finals ==
| Tie no | Home team | Score | Away team | Information |
|---|---|---|---|---|
| 287 | MyPa | 2-2; 7-8 (p.) | AC Allianssi | |
| 288 | IF Gnistan | 2-3 (aet) | FC Lahti | |

| Tie no | Home team | Score | Away team | Information |
|---|---|---|---|---|
| 289 | FC Haka | 5-0 | RoPS | |
| 290 | HJK A | 1-3 | FF Jaro | |

== Semi-finals ==
| Tie no | Home team | Score | Away team | Information |
|---|---|---|---|---|
| 291 | FC Lahti | 2-2; 4-2 (p.) | AC Allianssi | |

| Tie no | Home team | Score | Away team | Information |
|---|---|---|---|---|
| 292 | FC Haka | 3-1 | FF Jaro | |

== Final ==
| Tie no | Home team | Score | Away team | Information |
|---|---|---|---|---|
| 293 | FC Haka | 4–1 | FC Lahti | Att. 2,984 |
