= 2010 Nelonen – Finnish League Division 4 =

Finnish League Division 4
- Season: 2010
- Champions: FC Degis; FC Puotila; RiRa; NouLa; FC PaSa; JoPS /2; NP-H; KaPa-51; AS Moon; FC Muurola; Esse IK; FC Kiisto a-team; KoPa; NePa; VG-62

League tables for teams participating in Nelonen, the fifth tier in the Finnish Soccer League system, in 2010.

== 2010 League tables ==
=== Helsinki ===
==== Section 1 ====
Pos	Team	Pld	W	D	L	GF	GA	GD	Pts	Promotion or qualification
1	FC Degis	22	16	5	1	76	22	+54	53	Promoted
2	Vesa	22	13	5	4	65	39	+26	44	Playoffs
3	SUMU	22	11	2	9	52	43	+9	35	
4	KäPa/PuLe	22	10	5	7	50	47	+3	35	
5	FC POHU/2	22	9	6	7	42	33	+9	33	
6	Gnistan/2	22	8	4	10	43	45	−2	28	
7	MPS/2	22	8	4	10	54	61	−7	28	
8	PPJ	22	7	6	9	51	47	+4	27	
9	Arsenal	22	7	6	9	40	42	−2	27	
10	Kiffen/2	22	7	5	10	35	49	−14	26	
11	HJK-j/Kmäki	22	8	2	12	36	54	−18	26	
12	SAYKUS	22	3	0	19	22	84	−62	9	

==== Section 2 ====
Pos	Team	Pld	W	D	L	GF	GA	GD	Pts	Promotion or relegation
1	FC Puotila	22	16	4	2	56	28	+28	52	Promoted
2	Gnistan/Ogeli	22	12	6	4	46	25	+21	42	Promoted
3	LPS/Kuninkaat	22	12	1	9	47	38	+9	37	
4	Herrasmiehet	22	11	4	7	45	37	+8	37	
5	HIFK/2	22	9	6	7	53	36	+17	33	
6	FC Kontu/2	22	9	4	9	32	34	−2	31	
7	MPS/Old Stars	22	9	3	10	39	32	+7	30	
8	MaKu/Nelonen	22	8	6	8	43	59	−16	30	
9	FC Pihlajisto/LEPRE	22	8	5	9	43	45	−2	29	
10	Ellas	22	7	3	12	47	43	+4	24	
11	FC Kuitu/1	22	4	2	16	29	72	−43	14	Relegated
12	AC StaSi	22	3	4	15	28	59	−31	13	Relegated

==== Play-offs ====
FC Degis (Lohko 1/I) FC Puotila (Lohko 2/I)       4-3 (0-2)
Vesa (Lohko 1/II)    Gnistan/Ogeli (Lohko 2/II)   1-3 (0-2)

=== Uusimaa ===
==== Section 1 ====
Pos	Team	Pld	W	D	L	GF	GA	GD	Pts	Promotion or relegation
1	RiRa	20	18	2	0	112	34	+78	56	Promoted
2	Honka 3	20	11	4	5	34	28	+6	37	
3	Kasiysi Rocky	20	9	4	7	45	35	+10	31	
4	KarlU /Biisonit	20	9	4	7	47	39	+8	31	
5	FC Västnyland	20	9	3	8	37	43	−6	30	
6	Team Grani	20	9	2	9	36	34	+2	29	
7	EIF Akademi	20	7	5	8	37	32	+5	26	
8	HooGee 1	20	7	4	9	43	57	−14	25	
9	NuPS Reservi	20	7	3	10	45	51	−6	24	
10	LePa	20	7	0	13	31	38	−7	21	Relegated
11	EPS 2	20	1	1	18	20	96	−76	4	Relegated

==== Section 2 ====
Pos	Team	Pld	W	D	L	GF	GA	GD	Pts	Promotion or relegation
1	NouLa	22	18	1	3	80	26	+54	55	Promoted
2	Stars	22	15	3	4	65	34	+31	48	Promoted
3	EPS	22	14	1	7	66	36	+30	43	
4	Pathoven	22	12	3	7	51	43	+8	39	
5	FCD	22	11	3	8	62	35	+27	36	
6	Nopsa	22	10	2	10	53	34	+19	32	
7	Naseva	22	9	3	10	51	43	+8	30	
8	HyPS 02	22	9	3	10	38	47	−9	30	
9	EBK 2	22	9	2	11	52	71	−19	29	
10	MU	22	4	4	14	35	75	−40	16	Relegated
11	K-UP HC Skavaböle	22	3	4	15	25	78	−53	13	Relegated
12	Kasiysi Miehet	22	2	3	17	28	84	−56	9	Relegated

=== South-East Finland (Kaakkois-Suomi) ===
Pos	Team	Pld	W	D	L	GF	GA	GD	Pts	Promotion or relegation
1	FC PaSa	20	15	3	2	78	21	+57	48	Promoted
2	PaPe	20	13	2	5	53	35	+18	41	Promoted
3	Lappee JK	20	11	3	6	49	28	+21	36	
4	FC Peltirumpu	20	10	5	5	58	30	+28	35	
5	HP-47	20	9	5	6	81	41	+40	32	
6	KoPa	20	7	4	9	30	57	−27	25	
7	Ri-Pa	20	6	4	10	32	40	−8	22	
8	KuP	20	6	4	10	38	56	−18	22	
9	FC Villisiat	20	4	6	10	35	49	−14	18	
10	STPS/2	20	4	4	12	24	66	−42	16	
11	NaKa	20	3	4	13	37	92	−55	13	Relegated

=== Eastern Finland (Itä-Suomi) ===
==== Section A ====
Pos	Team	Pld	W	D	L	GF	GA	GD	Pts	Qualification
1	JoPS /2	18	14	2	2	67	34	+33	44	Playoffs
2	JuPS	18	12	0	6	42	38	+4	36	
3	FC Pogosta	18	11	0	7	63	38	+25	33	
4	Yllätys	18	10	0	8	40	25	+15	30	
5	JuPy	18	8	1	9	45	43	+2	25	
6	ToPS-90	18	3	2	13	36	57	−21	11	
7	Hurtat	18	2	1	15	22	80	−58	7	

Note: SC Riverball/2 withdrew

==== Section B ====
Pos	Team	Pld	W	D	L	GF	GA	GD	Pts	Promotion or relegation
1	NP-H	20	13	3	4	73	28	+45	42	Playoffs
2	SaPa	20	11	7	2	64	29	+35	40	Promoted
3	KuKi	20	10	8	2	70	39	+31	38	
4	RautU	20	10	3	7	53	39	+14	33	
5	SoU	20	9	5	6	43	33	+10	32	
6	ToU	20	8	5	7	48	45	+3	29	
7	MPR	20	7	5	8	37	48	−11	26	
8	LaPa-95	20	6	3	11	30	73	−43	21	
9	LiPa	20	6	2	12	39	44	−5	20	
10	PK-37 /2	20	4	8	8	35	41	−6	20	Relegated
11	KJK	20	0	3	17	29	102	−73	3	Relegated

Note: Warkaus JK/2 Withdrew

==== Section Winners play-offs ====
Pos	Team	Pld	W	D	L	GF	GA	GD	Pts
1	NP-H	2	2	0	0	8	0	+8	6
2	JoPS /2	2	0	0	2	0	8	−8	0

=== Central Finland (Keski-Suomi) ===
Pos	Team	Pld	W	D	L	GF	GA	GD	Pts	Promotion
1	KaPa-51	16	12	1	3	67	19	+48	37	Promoted
2	KaDy	16	12	1	3	48	18	+30	37	
3	LPK	16	11	3	2	49	18	+31	36	
4	SäyRi	16	10	1	5	51	27	+24	31	
5	Huki	16	8	1	7	52	48	+4	25	
6	Souls AC	16	5	1	10	45	66	−21	16	
7	HPP	16	5	1	10	28	55	−27	16	
8	FC Saarijärvi	16	2	1	13	16	74	−58	7	
9	PaRi	16	1	2	13	16	47	−31	5	

=== Northern Finland (Pohjois-Suomi) ===
==== Oulu ====
Pos	Team	Pld	W	D	L	GF	GA	GD	Pts	Promotion
1	AS Moon	18	11	3	4	57	38	+19	36	Promoted
2	JS Hercules	18	11	3	4	45	28	+17	36	Promoted
3	Ajax	18	11	1	6	59	28	+31	34	
4	FC Nets	18	7	7	4	29	26	+3	28	
5	FC Tarmo	18	9	1	8	51	31	+20	28	
6	FC Kurenpojat	18	7	5	6	30	29	+1	26	
7	OuRe	18	8	1	9	27	41	−14	25	
8	FC RAI	18	5	2	11	32	50	−18	17	
9	PaTe	18	5	2	11	29	53	−24	17	
10	OuJK	18	3	1	14	24	59	−35	10	

==== Lapland (Lappi) ====
Pos	Team	Pld	W	D	L	GF	GA	GD	Pts	Promotion
1	FC Muurola	18	16	0	2	75	27	+48	48	
2	FC-88 Kemi	18	15	0	3	72	22	+50	45	Promoted
3	KemPa	18	12	1	5	68	31	+37	37	
4	PaPa	18	12	1	5	63	39	+24	37	
5	Kolarin Kontio	18	6	5	7	28	32	−4	23	
6	FC Rio Grande	18	6	2	10	34	48	−14	20	
7	Kemijärven Kiekko	18	6	1	11	35	59	−24	19	
8	KiPS	18	4	1	13	24	60	−36	13	
9	ArPS	18	3	2	13	21	66	−45	11	
10	SoPa	18	3	1	14	27	63	−36	10	

=== Central Ostrobothnia (Keski-Pohjanmaa) ===
Pos	Team	Pld	W	D	L	GF	GA	GD	Pts	Promotion or relegation
1	Esse IK	22	18	2	2	95	23	+72	56	Promoted
2	GBK II	22	18	1	3	84	24	+60	55	
3	FC YPA II	22	15	3	4	66	31	+35	48	
4	PeFF	22	11	2	9	44	32	+12	35	
5	K-Pallo	22	10	4	8	43	51	−8	34	
6	IK Myran	22	7	7	8	38	40	−2	28	
7	No Stars	22	8	3	11	37	53	−16	27	
8	LBK	22	8	1	13	38	85	−47	25	
9	LoVe	22	7	3	12	34	47	−13	24	
10	HBK	22	7	3	12	29	48	−19	24	
11	KP-V	22	5	4	13	39	60	−21	19	Relegated
12	Team NIK	22	1	1	20	22	75	−53	4	Relegated

=== Vaasa ===
Pos	Team	Pld	W	D	L	GF	GA	GD	Pts	Promotion or relegation
1	FC Kiisto a-team	22	16	0	6	58	31	+27	48	Promoted
2	VIFK Utveckling	22	15	2	5	67	32	+35	47	
3	Kungliga Wasa C.F.	22	14	1	7	39	26	+13	43	
4	SuSi Young Boys	22	11	4	7	55	35	+20	37	
5	FC Kuffen	22	11	2	9	48	34	+14	35	
6	Ponnistus	22	11	2	9	59	46	+13	35	
7	NuPa	22	10	2	10	47	58	−11	32	
8	Kaskö IK /TePa	22	8	4	10	40	57	−17	28	
9	Sisu-Pallo	22	7	4	11	49	57	−8	25	
10	Korsnäs FF/PeIK	22	7	1	14	37	57	−20	22	
11	VäVi	22	7	1	14	37	64	−27	22	Relegated
12	Närpes Kraft/2	22	2	3	17	34	73	−39	9	Relegated

=== Satakunta ===
Pos	Team	Pld	W	D	L	GF	GA	GD	Pts	Relegation
1	KoPa	14	10	1	3	38	24	+14	31	
2	HNS	14	9	3	2	58	24	+34	30	
3	Koitto	14	9	2	3	41	23	+18	29	
4	EuPa2	14	7	2	5	49	26	+23	23	
5	PoSa	14	6	3	5	47	36	+11	21	
6	MäKi	14	3	1	10	18	48	−30	10	Relegated
7	IKiri	14	3	0	11	33	50	−17	9	Relegated
8	MInto	14	3	0	11	23	76	−53	9	Relegated

Note: ReKu Withdrew

=== Tampere ===
Pos	Team	Pld	W	D	L	GF	GA	GD	Pts	Promotion or relegation
1	NePa	22	14	6	2	79	23	+56	48	Promoted
2	Loiske	22	13	5	4	68	39	+29	44	
3	FC Tampere	22	12	4	6	67	34	+33	40	
4	KaVo	22	11	4	7	45	37	+8	37	
5	LeKi-futis	22	9	7	6	63	37	+26	34	
6	LaVe	22	10	4	8	55	36	+19	34	
7	ParVi	22	9	6	7	47	42	+5	33	
8	Sopu	22	9	1	12	30	57	−27	28	Playoffs
9	PJK /2	22	7	5	10	45	59	−14	26	Relegated
10	PP-70 /2	22	6	4	12	55	74	−19	22	Relegated
11	Valo	22	3	4	15	33	84	−51	13	Relegated
12	ViiPV	22	3	2	17	23	88	−65	11	Relegated

=== Turku and Åland (Turku and Ahvenanmaa) ===
Pos	Team	Pld	W	D	L	GF	GA	GD	Pts	Promotion or relegation
1	VG-62	22	18	2	2	96	15	+81	56	Promoted
2	PiPS	22	14	4	4	72	38	+34	46	
3	MynPa	22	12	4	6	69	44	+25	40	
4	TuWe	22	11	5	6	54	36	+18	38	
5	UPK	22	11	4	7	64	51	+13	37	
6	TPK 2	22	10	5	7	40	56	−16	35	
7	ÅIFK 2	22	9	3	10	42	50	−8	30	
8	FC RP	22	7	5	10	42	62	−20	26	
9	SaTo	22	8	1	13	41	50	−9	25	Relegated
10	JIK	22	4	5	13	37	58	−21	17	Relegated
11	Ponteva	22	4	2	16	38	82	−44	14	Relegated
12	KaaRe	22	4	0	18	26	79	−53	12	Relegated

== References and sources ==
- Finnish FA
- ResultCode
