= 2009 Nelonen – Finnish League Division 4 =

Finnish League Division 4
- Season: 2009
- Champions: FC POHU; Zenith; RIlves; TiPS; IPS; LehPa; SiPS; KeuPa; Spartak; ToTa; IFK Jakobstad; SIF; MuSa2; TP-T; HammIK

League tables for teams participating in Nelonen, the fifth tier in the Finnish Soccer League system, in 2009.

== 2009 League tables ==
=== Helsinki ===
==== Section 1 ====
Pos	Team	Pld	W	D	L	GF	GA	GD	Pts	Promotion or relegation
1	FC POHU	22	16	5	1	74	19	+55	53	Promoted
2	HDS/Mondial	22	15	2	5	73	35	+38	47	Promoted
3	Gnistan/Ogeli	22	12	3	7	68	37	+31	39	
4	KäPa/PuLe	22	12	3	7	54	42	+12	39	
5	Vesa	22	12	2	8	51	30	+21	38	
6	Kiffen/2	22	10	6	6	60	46	+14	36	
7	PPJ	22	8	5	9	51	48	+3	29	
8	MPS/Old Stars	22	7	3	12	29	50	−21	24	
9	FC POHU/2	22	6	5	11	28	41	−13	23	
10	AC StaSi	22	5	4	13	33	79	−46	19	
11	Strikers/Bertil	22	4	2	16	35	75	−40	14	Relegated
12	PH-99	22	4	2	16	38	92	−54	14	Relegated

==== Section 2 ====
Pos	Team	Pld	W	D	L	GF	GA	GD	Pts	Promotion or relegation
1	Zenith	22	16	3	3	67	17	+50	51	Promoted
2	MPS/Atletico Malmi	22	12	8	2	63	25	+38	44	Promoted
3	LPS/Kuninkaat	22	12	5	5	64	30	+34	41	
4	Gnistan/2	22	12	5	5	45	27	+18	41	
5	SAYKUS	22	12	2	8	34	26	+8	38	
6	FC Kontu/2	22	11	4	7	40	27	+13	37	
7	FC Puotila	22	9	4	9	48	49	−1	31	
8	MPS/2	22	8	5	9	28	52	−24	29	
9	Herrasmiehet	22	5	6	11	34	43	−9	21	
10	MaKu/Nelonen	22	6	2	14	54	65	−11	20	
11	Tavastia	22	4	4	14	30	58	−28	16	Relegated
12	Valtti	22	1	0	21	15	103	−88	3	Relegated

==== Play-offs ====
HDS/Mondial (Section 1/II)   MPS/Atletico Malmi (Section 2/II)  3-3 (1-1) pens 4-5
FC POHU (Section 1/I)        Zenith (Section 2/I)               1-2 (1-1)

=== Uusimaa ===
==== Section 1 ====
Pos	Team	Pld	W	D	L	GF	GA	GD	Pts	Promotion or relegation
1	RIlves	22	17	4	1	78	21	+57	55	Promoted
2	MasKi	22	15	1	6	63	41	+22	46	Promoted
3	FC Västnyland	22	14	3	5	64	28	+36	45	
4	EBK Stars	22	10	4	8	37	31	+6	34	
5	Team Grani	22	10	2	10	36	33	+3	32	
6	EPS	22	8	5	9	37	39	−2	29	
7	NuPS Reservi	22	8	4	10	36	51	−15	28	
8	Honka 3	22	6	8	8	33	39	−6	26	
9	Karjalohjan Biisonit	22	6	6	10	50	62	−12	24	
10	HooGee	22	4	7	11	23	41	−18	19	Relegated
11	Tikka	22	4	4	14	28	57	−29	16	Relegated
12	FC Lohja	22	4	4	14	25	67	−42	16	Relegated

==== Section 2 ====
Pos	Team	Pld	W	D	L	GF	GA	GD	Pts	Promotion or relegation
1	TiPS	22	19	1	2	72	17	+55	58	Promoted
2	SibboV	22	14	3	5	51	25	+26	45	Promoted
3	Nopsa	22	12	3	7	50	33	+17	39	
4	Pathoven	22	11	5	6	66	43	+23	38	
5	RiRa	22	10	4	8	71	51	+20	34	
6	NouLa	22	10	3	9	49	44	+5	33	
7	MU	22	9	3	10	50	49	+1	30	
8	FCD	22	7	8	7	48	37	+11	29	
9	EBK 2	22	7	1	14	40	66	−26	22	
10	Akilles	22	4	4	14	31	62	−31	16	Relegated
11	IVU	22	4	4	14	32	75	−43	16	Relegated
12	JäPS M2	22	3	5	14	27	85	−58	14	Relegated

=== South-East Finland (Kaakkois-Suomi) ===
Pos	Team	Pld	W	D	L	GF	GA	GD	Pts	Promotion or relegation
1	IPS	20	17	3	0	73	13	+60	54	Promoted
2	KTP / 2	20	13	3	4	63	27	+36	42	Promoted
3	PaPe	20	9	6	5	46	33	+13	33	
4	FC Villisiat	20	9	5	6	40	31	+9	32	
5	RiPa	20	8	6	6	42	39	+3	30	
6	FC Peltirumpu	20	7	5	8	46	45	+1	26	
7	KuP	20	5	5	10	35	53	−18	20	
8	HP-47	20	6	2	12	44	63	−19	20	
9	NaKa	20	6	1	13	36	75	−39	19	
10	KoPa	20	5	2	13	30	46	−16	17	
11	Purha	20	4	4	12	39	69	−30	16	Relegated

=== Eastern Finland (Itä-Suomi) ===
==== Section A ====
Pos	Team	Pld	W	D	L	GF	GA	GD	Pts	Promotion or relegation
1	LehPa	21	14	4	3	83	15	+68	46	Promoted
2	JuPy	21	13	4	4	53	25	+28	43	
3	Yllätys	21	10	7	4	39	31	+8	37	
4	JoPS/2	21	11	4	6	54	35	+19	37	
5	JuPS	21	5	6	10	28	51	−23	21	
6	FC Pogosta	21	6	2	13	41	66	−25	20	
7	Hurtat	21	5	4	12	23	52	−29	19	
8	PoPS-78	21	2	5	14	22	68	−46	11	Relegated

==== Section B ====
Pos	Team	Pld	W	D	L	GF	GA	GD	Pts	Promotion or relegation
1	SiPS	22	16	4	2	67	22	+45	52	Promoted
2	SaPa	22	15	3	4	94	23	+71	48	
3	KuKi	22	11	6	5	59	33	+26	39	
4	SuPa	22	12	3	7	47	46	+1	39	
5	PK-37 /2	22	11	2	9	44	49	−5	35	
6	Warkaus JK /2	22	11	2	9	64	52	+12	35	
7	MPR	22	9	3	10	58	61	−3	30	
8	LiPa	22	8	5	9	38	40	−2	29	
9	NP-H	22	8	4	10	46	44	+2	28	
10	RautU	22	6	6	10	41	61	−20	24	
11	PAVE	22	3	3	16	27	81	−54	12	Relegated
12	KiuPa	22	0	3	19	23	96	−73	3	Relegated

==== Section Winners play-offs ====
Pos	Team	Pld	W	D	L	GF	GA	GD	Pts	Qualification
1	SiPS	2	1	1	0	4	3	+1	4	Section Winner
2	LehPa	2	0	1	1	3	4	−1	1	

=== Central Finland (Keski-Suomi) ===
Pos	Team	Pld	W	D	L	GF	GA	GD	Pts	Promotion
1	KeuPa	18	14	1	3	63	19	+44	43	Promoted
2	Huki	18	14	1	3	62	32	+30	43	
3	KaPa-51	18	12	1	5	57	39	+18	37	
4	LPK	18	9	2	7	59	33	+26	29	
5	KaDy	18	7	1	10	31	44	−13	22	
6	FC Saarijärvi	18	6	1	11	41	60	−19	19	
7	Souls AC	18	5	3	10	42	49	−7	18	
8	HPP	18	4	5	9	27	45	−18	17	
9	Huima II	18	5	2	11	27	54	−27	17	
10	MuurY	18	4	3	11	39	73	−34	15	

=== Northern Finland (Pohjois-Suomi) ===
==== Oulu ====
Pos	Team	Pld	W	D	L	GF	GA	GD	Pts	Promotion or relegation
1	Spartak	18	14	2	2	66	13	+53	44	Promoted
2	FC Nets	18	11	2	5	52	37	+15	35	
3	FC Tarmo	18	10	1	7	50	29	+21	31	
4	FC Kurenpojat	18	9	2	7	36	31	+5	29	
5	Ajax Sarkkiranta	18	8	5	5	51	40	+11	29	
6	PaTe	18	8	1	9	52	60	−8	25	
7	AS Moon	18	6	2	10	38	56	−18	20	
8	OuRe	18	5	3	10	21	57	−36	18	
9	JS Hercules	18	4	2	12	32	62	−30	14	
10	MetroStars	18	4	2	12	31	44	−13	14	Relegated

==== Lapland (Lappi) ====
Pos	Team	Pld	W	D	L	GF	GA	GD	Pts	Promotion
1	ToTa	16	11	4	1	38	13	+25	37	Promoted
2	Kolarin Kontio	16	10	4	2	45	20	+25	34	
3	KemPa	16	10	2	4	51	21	+30	32	
4	FC Muurola 2	16	9	2	5	43	34	+9	29	
5	FC Rio Grande	16	6	3	7	29	32	−3	21	
6	PaPa	16	6	0	10	37	47	−10	18	
7	ArPS	16	5	2	9	31	51	−20	17	
8	KiPS	16	4	1	11	21	48	−27	13	
9	SoPa	16	1	2	13	20	49	−29	5	

=== Central Ostrobothnia (Keski-Pohjanmaa) ===
Pos	Team	Pld	W	D	L	GF	GA	GD	Pts	Promotion or relegation
1	IFK Jakobstad	20	17	2	1	96	20	+76	53	Promoted
2	Esse IK	20	14	3	3	70	20	+50	45	
3	PeFF	20	11	2	7	54	28	+26	35	
4	LBK	20	9	4	7	50	45	+5	31	
5	No Stars	20	8	4	8	36	54	−18	28	
6	K-Pallo	20	7	6	7	54	49	+5	27	
7	LoVe	20	7	4	9	37	51	−14	25	
8	IK Myran	20	6	5	9	43	46	−3	23	
9	HBK	20	5	4	11	22	51	−29	19	
10	GBK II	20	5	4	11	29	60	−31	19	
11	OuHu	20	2	0	18	18	85	−67	6	Relegated

=== Vaasa ===
Pos	Team	Pld	W	D	L	GF	GA	GD	Pts	Promotion or relegation
1	SIF	22	17	1	4	77	26	+51	52	Promoted
2	FC Kiisto a-team	22	13	0	9	56	45	+11	39	
3	VIFK U	22	11	4	7	53	25	+28	37	
4	KaIK /TePa	22	11	3	8	56	42	+14	36	
5	TP-Seinäjoki	22	11	3	8	52	44	+8	36	
6	Kungliga Wasa C.F.	22	10	5	7	48	38	+10	35	
7	Kraft/2	22	10	3	9	54	46	+8	33	
8	VäVi	22	8	3	11	38	56	−18	27	
9	NuPa	22	8	2	12	31	55	−24	26	
10	Norrvalla FF/2	22	8	1	13	46	61	−15	25	
11	ABC	22	7	3	12	36	50	−14	24	Relegated
12	Sisu	22	4	0	18	23	82	−59	12	Relegated

=== Satakunta ===
Pos	Team	Pld	W	D	L	GF	GA	GD	Pts	Promotion
1	MuSa2	14	10	1	3	39	14	+25	31	Promoted
2	LuVe	14	8	4	2	37	20	+17	28	Promoted
3	HNS	14	7	1	6	29	29	0	22	
4	IKiri	14	6	1	7	42	34	+8	19	
5	KoPa	14	5	4	5	31	30	+1	19	
6	EuPa2	14	5	3	6	30	34	−4	18	
7	MäKi	14	4	3	7	31	47	−16	15	
8	MInto	14	2	1	11	27	58	−31	7	

=== Tampere ===
Pos	Team	Pld	W	D	L	GF	GA	GD	Pts	Promotion or relegation
1	TP-T	22	16	4	2	93	33	+60	52	Promoted
2	TPV/2	22	16	1	5	63	28	+35	49	Promoted
3	NePa	22	13	5	4	49	24	+25	44	
4	LaVe	22	11	4	7	47	46	+1	37	
5	PJK/2	22	10	3	9	63	39	+24	33	
6	FC Tampere	22	9	3	10	38	46	−8	30	
7	PP-70/2	22	8	5	9	52	68	−16	29	
8	ViiPV	22	8	3	11	46	54	−8	27	
9	Sopu	22	7	4	11	38	41	−3	25	
10	LeKi	22	7	3	12	47	53	−6	24	Relegation Playoffs
11	FC Vapsi	22	6	3	13	38	58	−20	21	Relegated
12	NoPy	22	1	2	19	25	109	−84	5	Relegated

=== Turku and Åland (Turku and Ahvenanmaa) ===
Pos	Team	Pld	W	D	L	GF	GA	GD	Pts	Promotion or relegation
1	HammIK	22	18	2	2	77	27	+50	56	Promoted
2	FC Inter 2	22	17	3	2	53	18	+35	54	Promoted
3	VG-62	22	13	4	5	59	36	+23	43	
4	JIK	22	9	6	7	62	40	+22	33	
5	TuWe	22	9	2	11	49	50	−1	29	
6	GPR FC	22	9	1	12	42	59	−17	28	
7	UPK	22	8	2	12	41	59	−18	26	
8	TPK 2	22	8	1	13	40	72	−32	25	
9	FC RP	22	7	2	13	36	58	−22	23	
10	Ponteva	22	7	1	14	44	62	−18	22	
11	SCR	22	6	3	13	56	52	+4	21	Relegated
12	PiPS	22	6	3	13	34	60	−26	21	Relegated

== References and sources ==
- Finnish FA
- ResultCode
