= Siilinjärven Palloseura =

Finnish football club

- Full name: Siilinjärven Palloseura
- Nickname: SiPS
- Founded: 1974
- Ground: Ahmo urheilualue, Siilinjärvi, Finland
- Capacity: 500
- Chairman: Mauno Räty
- Manager: Kai Rönkkö
- League: Kolmonen
Home colours	Away colours

Siilinjärven Palloseura (abbreviated SiPS) is a football club from Siilinjärvi, Finland. The club was formed in 1974 and their home ground is at the Ahmo urheilualue. The men's first team currently plays in the Kolmonen (Third Division).

== Background ==
The club has evolved dramatically in recent years and now has around 350 members. In Autumn 2009 the Ahmo urheilualue (sports area) was opened by the club, including the Yara Arena sports hall and a full size artificial turf football pitch.

During the period 1997 to 2007 SiPS competed in the Kolmonen but in 2008 it withdrew because of economic reasons. However the men's first team re-formed in 2009 and competed in the Nelonen. Their first season back was a great success which culminated in their promotion back to the Kolmonen.

== Season to season ==
Season	Level	Division	Section	Administration	Position	Movements
2002	Tier 4	Kolmonen (Third Division)		Eastern Finland (SPL Itä-Suomi)	3rd	
2003	Tier 4	Kolmonen (Third Division)		Eastern Finland (SPL Itä-Suomi)	2nd	
2004	Tier 4	Kolmonen (Third Division)		Eastern Finland (SPL Itä-Suomi)	7th	
2005	Tier 4	Kolmonen (Third Division)		Eastern Finland (SPL Itä-Suomi)	2nd	Play-off Group – 3rd
2006	Tier 4	Kolmonen (Third Division)		Eastern Finland (SPL Itä-Suomi)	2nd	
2007	Tier 4	Kolmonen (Third Division)		Eastern Finland (SPL Itä-Suomi)	5th	
2008		Withdrew from Kolmonen				
2009	Tier 5	Nelonen (Fourth Division)	Section B	Eastern Finland (SPL Itä-Suomi)	1st	Promoted
2010	Tier 4	Kolmonen (Third Division)		Eastern and Central Finland (SPL Itä-Suomi)		

- 7 seasons in Kolmonen
- 1 season in Nelonen

== Club Structure ==
Siilinjärven Palloseura runs a large number of teams including 2 men's teams, 1 ladies teams, 9 boys teams and 3 girls teams.

The junior section of the club has around 300 registered players including about 70 girls. The club is able to provide high quality training facilities on both synthetic and natural grass and within the training hall. In 2007 and 2008 the B-juniors won the Kokkola Cup.

== 2010 season ==
SiPS First Team are competing in the Kolmonen administered by the Itä-Suomi SPL and Keski-Suomi SPL. This is the fourth highest tier in the Finnish football system. In 2009 SiPS were promoted from the Nelonen.

SiPS/2 are participating in Section C (Lohko C) of the Vitonen administered by the Itä-Suomi SPL.

== References and sources ==
- Official Website
- Finnish Wikipedia
- Suomen Cup
