= LPS/Kuninkaat =

Finnish football club

- Nickname: LPS
- Founded: 1999
- Ground: Kallion tekonurmi, Kallio, Helsinki; Finland
- Manager: Reko Etelävuori, Janne Suvensalmi
- League: Nelonen
Home colours	Away colours

LPS/Kuninkaat is a football club from Helsinki in Finland. The club was formed in 1999. Team currently plays in the Nelonen (fourth division). LPS/Kuninkaat is playing under the flag of Laajasalon Palloseura.

== Background ==
The club was established by a group of friends in 1999. Same friends played Floorball in a club called S.C. Kings before the football club. Kuninkaat couldn't use the name S.C. Kings in football because a club named S.C. Kings already existed. LPS/Kuninkaat started their journey in Finnish seventh division and picked up one level every year until 4th division. Kuninkaat has also a team in futsal.

== Club structure ==
LPS/Kuninkaat is part of Laajasalon Palloseura.

== 2015 season ==
LPS / Kuninkaat is participating in Section 2 of the Nelonen (Fourth Division) administered by the Helsinki SPL.

== 2016 season ==
LPS / Kuninkaat is participating in Section 2 of the Nelonen (Fourth Division) administered by the Helsinki SPL.

== References and sources ==
- Official Website
- Finnish Wikipedia
- Facebook
