= Luvian Veto =

Finnish sports club

- Full name: Luvian Veto
- Nicknames: LuVe, Luventus
- Founded: 1930
- Ground: Keskustan urheilukenttä, Luvia, Finland
- Chairman: Harri Lehtinen
- Coach: Joni Johansson; Juho Lehtonen
- League: Nelonen
Home colours	Away colours

Luvian Veto (abbreviated LuVe) is a sports club from Luvia, Finland. The club was formed in 1930 and currently has sections covering football, skiing, athletics and fitness. The men's football first team currently plays in the Nelonen (Fourth Division). Their home ground is at the Tasala Park.

== Background ==
LuVe have always competed in the lower divisions of the Finnish football league. However, since the club re-entered the league in 2003 they have made steady progress over the last 8 seasons gaining respective promotions from the Vitonen (Fifth Division) in 2004 and Nelonen (Fourth Division) in 2009. Playing in the Kolmonen (Third Division) in the 2010 season represents a new challenge for the club.

== Season to season ==
Season	Level	Division	Section	Administration	Position	Movements
2003	Tier 6	Vitonen (Fifth Division)		Satakunta District (SPL Satakunta)	5th	
2004	Tier 6	Vitonen (Fifth Division)		Satakunta District (SPL Satakunta)	1st	Promoted
2005	Tier 5	Nelonen (Fourth Division)		Satakunta District (SPL Satakunta)	7th	
2006	Tier 5	Nelonen (Fourth Division)		Satakunta District (SPL Satakunta)	5th	
2007	Tier 5	Nelonen (Fourth Division)		Satakunta District (SPL Satakunta)	7th	
2008	Tier 5	Nelonen (Fourth Division)		Satakunta District (SPL Satakunta)	3rd	
2009	Tier 5	Nelonen (Fourth Division)		Satakunta District (SPL Satakunta)	2nd	Promoted
2010	Tier 4	Kolmonen (Third Division)		Satakunta District (SPL Satakunta)	8th	Relegated

- 1 season in Kolmonen
- 5 seasons in Nelonen
- 2 seasons in Vitonen

== Club Structure ==
Luvian Veto run a large number of teams including 2 men's team, 1 ladies team, 2 men's veterans team and 8 boys teams. The club also run futsal teams in the winter months.

== 2010 season ==
LuVe Men's Team are competing in the Kolmonen (Third Division) section administered by the Satakunta SPL. This is the fourth highest tier in the Finnish football system. In 2009 LuVe finished in 2nd place in the Nelonen (Fourth Division).

LuVe /2 are participating in the Vitonen (Fifth Division) section administered by the Satakunta SPL.

== References and sources ==
- Official Website
- Finnish Wikipedia
- Suomen Cup
- Luvian Veto Facebook
