= Äänekosken Huima =

Finnish sports club

- Nickname: Huima
- Founded: 1904
- Ground: Center Field of Äänekoski; Äänekoski; Finland
- Coach: Mika Järvinen; Markku Vertainen
- League: Kakkonen
- 2026: Kakkonen Group C, 1st of 10
Home colours

Äänekosken Huima (abbreviated Huima) is a sports club from Äänekoski, Finland. The club was formed in 1904 and is best known for its basketball team. The men's football first team currently plays in the Third Division (Kolmonen). Their home ground is the Center Field of Äänekoski (Äänekosken Keskuskenttä).

== Background ==
Huima have played 6 seasons in the Ykkönen (First Division), the second tier of Finnish football in 1971 and 1983–87. They also have had five spells covering 10 seasons in the third tier, the Kakkonen (Second Division), in 1982, 1988, 1997–2000, 2004–06 and 2008.

== Season to season ==
Season	Level	Division	Section	Administration	Position	Movements
2003	Tier 4	Kolmonen (Third Division)		Central Finland (SPL Keski-Suomi)	1st	Play-offs – Promoted
2004	Tier 3	Kakkonen (Second Division)	East Group	Finnish FA (Suomen Pallolitto)	4th	
2005	Tier 3	Kakkonen (Second Division)	East Group	Finnish FA (Suomen Pallolitto)	6th	
2006	Tier 3	Kakkonen (Second Division)	Group A	Finnish FA (Suomen Pallolitto)	12th	Relegated
2007	Tier 4	Kolmonen (Third Division)		Central Finland (SPL Keski-Suomi)	1st	Promoted
2008	Tier 3	Kakkonen (Second Division)	Group B	Finnish FA (Suomen Pallolitto)	12th	Relegated
2009	Tier 4	Kolmonen (Third Division)		Eastern and Central Finland (SPL Itä-Suomi)	9th	
2010	Tier 4	Kolmonen (Third Division)		Eastern and Central Finland (SPL Itä-Suomi)	10th	
2011	Tier 4	Kolmonen (Third Division)		Eastern and Central Finland (SPL Itä-Suomi)	9th	
2012	Tier 4	Kolmonen (Third Division)		Eastern and Central Finland (SPL Itä-Suomi)	6th	

- 4 seasons in Kakkonen
- 6 seasons in Kolmonen

== Club structure ==
Äänekosken Huima run a number of teams including 1 men's team, 6 boys teams and 2 girls teams.

== 2012 season ==
Huima First Team are competing in the Kolmonen administered by the Itä-Suomi SPL and Keski-Suomi SPL. This is the fourth highest tier in the Finnish football system. In 2011 Huima finished in ninth position in their Kolmonen section.

Huima II are not running a team since the 2009 season.

== References and sources ==
- Official ClubWebsite
- Football Club Website
- Finnish Wikipedia
- Suomen Cup
