= Laajasalon Palloseura =

Finnish football club

- Full name: Laajasalon Palloseura
- Nickname: LPS
- Founded: 1978; 48 years ago
- Stadium: Reilusti parempi Saari areena
- Chairman: Timo Viheriäranta
- Head Coach: Michael O'Neill
- Coach: Michael O'Neill
- League: Kolmonen
- 2024: 4th – Kolmonen (Group C)
- Website: laajasalonpalloseura.fi
Home colours	Away colours

Laajasalon Palloseura (abbreviated LPS) is a football club from Laajasalo, Helsinki in Finland. The club was formed in 1978 and their home ground is at the Laajasalon urheilupuisto. The men's first team currently plays in the Kolmonen (Third Division). The Chairman of LPS is Timo Viheriäranta.

== Background ==
The club held their inaugural meeting on 11 September 1978 and 14 people attended who were interested in football. For the early part of their history LPS spent many seasons in the lower divisions of the Finnish football league. In 2003 LPS won their Kolmonen section and subsequently played 10 consecutive seasons in the Kakkonen (Second Division), the third tier of Finnish football from 2004 before being relegated in 2013. The most successful season was in 2007 when LPS finished fourth in their section.

The club finished 5th, 4th and 5th in the first three years back in Kolmonen. In 2017, the club picked up 7 points from the first 4 games and went on a run of 16 consecutive wins which saw them go into the penultimate round of the season on October 1, 4 points ahead of league rivals and second place NJS, who were the last team to stop them winning in a 0–0 draw on May 12. A shock 4–0 defeat against TuPS still had them 1 point ahead, with the final match a home tie against Reipas who ended up finishing a distant 3rd, 19 points behind LPS.

LPS trailed 2–0 at half-time but managed to recover to 2–2 in the 84th minute, only to have a man sent off a minute later and unable to find the third goal to win the game and win the league. LPS were promoted to the Kakkonen in 2nd place but would return to the Kolmonen immediately, finishing bottom of the league. Upon return to the Kolmonen, the highest league finishes were third in 2019 and 2022, but both some way off the league winners, 15 and 10 points away respectively.

== Season to season ==
Season	Level	Division	Section	Administration	Position	Movements
1980	Tier 5	IV Divisioona (Fourth Division)	Group 1	Helsinki & Uusimaa(SPL Helsinki)	7th	
1981	Tier 5	IV Divisioona (Fourth Division)	Group 1	Helsinki & Uusimaa(SPL Helsinki)	12th	Relegated
1982	Tier 6	V Divisioona (Fifth Division)		Helsinki District (SPL Helsinki)	4th	
1983	Tier 6	V Divisioona (Fifth Division)	Group 2	Helsinki District (SPL Helsinki)		Promoted
1984	Tier 5	IV Divisioona (Fourth Division)	Group 2	Helsinki & Uusimaa(SPL Helsinki)	4th	
1985	Tier 5	IV Divisioona (Fourth Division)	Group 2	Helsinki & Uusimaa(SPL Helsinki)	6th	
1986	Tier 5	IV Divisioona (Fourth Division)	Group 1	Helsinki & Uusimaa(SPL Helsinki)	2nd	
1987	Tier 5	IV Divisioona (Fourth Division)	Group 1	Helsinki & Uusimaa(SPL Helsinki)	9th	
1988						
1989						
1990	Tier 5	IV Divisioona (Fourth Division)	Group 2	Helsinki & Uusimaa(SPL Helsinki)	9th	
1991	Tier 5	IV Divisioona (Fourth Division)	Group 1	Helsinki & Uusimaa(SPL Helsinki)	7th	
1992	Tier 5	IV Divisioona (Fourth Division)	Group 2	Helsinki & Uusimaa(SPL Helsinki)	8th	
1993	Tier 5	Nelonen (Fourth Division)	Group 1	Helsinki & Uusimaa(SPL Helsinki)	4th	
1994	Tier 5	Nelonen (Fourth Division)	Group 1	Helsinki & Uusimaa(SPL Helsinki)	7th	
1995	Tier 5	Nelonen (Fourth Division)	Group 1	Helsinki & Uusimaa(SPL Helsinki)	12th	Relegated
1996	Tier 6	Vitonen (Fifth Division)	Upper Group	Helsinki District (SPL Helsinki)	5th	
1997						
1998	Tier 5	Nelonen (Fourth Division)	Group 3	Helsinki & Uusimaa(SPL Helsinki)		Promoted
1999	Tier 4	Kolmonen (Third Division)	Group 2	Helsinki & Uusimaa (SPL Uusimaa)	8th	
2000	Tier 4	Kolmonen (Third Division)	Section 3	Helsinki & Uusimaa (SPL Uusimaa)	7th	
2001	Tier 4	Kolmonen (Third Division)	Section 3	Helsinki & Uusimaa (SPL Helsinki)		
2002	Tier 4	Kolmonen (Third Division)	Section 3	Helsinki & Uusimaa (SPL Helsinki)	2nd	
2003	Tier 4	Kolmonen (Third Division)	Section 3	Helsinki & Uusimaa (SPL Helsinki)	1st	Promoted
2004	Tier 3	Kakkonen (Second Division)	South Group	Finnish FA (Suomen Pallolitto)	7th	
2005	Tier 3	Kakkonen (Second Division)	South Group	Finnish FA (Suomen Pallolitto)	6th	
2006	Tier 3	Kakkonen (Second Division)	Group A	Finnish FA (Suomen Pallolitto)	8th	
2007	Tier 3	Kakkonen (Second Division)	Group A	Finnish FA (Suomen Pallolitto)	4th	
2008	Tier 3	Kakkonen (Second Division)	Group A	Finnish FA (Suomen Pallolitto)	9th	
2009	Tier 3	Kakkonen (Second Division)	Group A	Finnish FA (Suomen Pallolitto)	10th	
2010	Tier 3	Kakkonen (Second Division)	Group A	Finnish FA (Suomen Pallolitto)	7th	
2011	Tier 3	Kakkonen (Second Division)	Group A	Finnish FA (Suomen Pallolitto)	10th	
2012	Tier 3	Kakkonen (Second Division)	Eastern	Finnish FA (Suomen Pallolitto)	8th	
2013	Tier 3	Kakkonen (Second Division)	South Froup	Finnish FA (Suomen Pallolitto)	10th	Relegated
2014	Tier 4	Kolmonen (Third Division)	Section 3	Helsinki & Uusimaa (SPL Uusimaa)	5th	
2015	Tier 4	Kolmonen (Third Division)	Section 2	Helsinki & Uusimaa (SPL Uusimaa)	4th	
2016	Tier 4	Kolmonen (Third Division)	Group 1	Helsinki & Uusimaa (SPL Uusimaa)	5th	
2017	Tier 4	Kolmonen (Third Division)	Group 3	Helsinki & Uusimaa (SPL Uusimaa)	2nd	Promoted
2018	Tier 3	Kakkonen (Second Division)	Group A	Finnish FA (Suomen Pallolitto)	12th	Relegated
2019	Tier 4	Kolmonen (Third Division)	Group 2	Helsinki(SPL Helsinki)	3rd	
2020	Tier 4	Kolmonen (Third Division)	Group A	Helsinki(SPL Helsinki)	8th/18	
2021	Tier 4	Kolmonen (Third Division)	Group B	Helsinki(SPL Helsinki)	6th/12	
2022	Tier 4	Kolmonen (Third Division)	Group C	Helsinki(SPL Helsinki)	3rd/12	
2023	Tier 4	Kolmonen (Third Division)	Group B	Helsinki(SPL Helsinki)	5th/12	
2024	Tier 5	Kolmonen (Third Division)	Group B	Helsinki(SPL Helsinki)	4th/12	

- 10 seasons in Kakkonen
- 15 seasons in Kolmonen

== Club Structure ==
LPS currently has 4 men's teams for competitive soccer and 2 men's teams for hobbysoccer. For women LPS has one competitive soccer team and one team for hobbysoccer. In addition there is a junior section with at least 2 boys teams per age group and girls teams from 2011 down, providing football for approximately 900 youngsters. The club runs a soccer school at summer and a school for juniors to improve their soccerskills.

The most successful junior team is the 2010 Boys team that plays at the second highest level in Finland, in 1st Division (Ykkönen) starting Spring 2025.

=== Lower Level Teams ===
The second ranked men's team is Höna who play in the Nelonen (4th Division). The Kuninkaat who currently play under the flag of LPS play in the Vitonen (5th Division) as well as the Reservi, formed in 2024, which acts as an Under 20 and reserve team to the main First Team. In their first season, they won promotion to the Vitonen, remaining undefeated through the whole season.

== 2025 season ==
LPS Men's Team are competing in Group C of the Kolmonen (Third Division) administered by the Helsinki SPL. This is the fifth highest tier in the Finnish football system.

LPS / 2 are participating in Group 3 of the Nelonen (Fourth Division) administered by the Helsinki SPL.

LPS / Kuninkaat are participating in Group 4 and LPS / Reservi in Group 5 of the Vitonen (Sixth Division) administered by the Helsinki SPL.

== Current Squad for the 2012 season ==
Note: Flags indicate national team as defined under FIFA eligibility rules; some limited exceptions apply. Players may hold more than one non-FIFA nationality.

No.	Pos.	Nation	Player
1	GK	FIN	Niko Ruuth
2	DF	RWA	Said Ndikumana
3	DF	FIN	Juha Leukkunen
4	FW	COD	Erick Dibwe Mupemedi
5	MF	FIN	Teemu Kankkonen
6	DF	FIN	Patrik Borg
7	FW	FIN	Niko Haiko
8	FW	FIN	Jamy-Tommy Viljamaa
9	MF	FIN	Georgios Mainas
10	FW	FIN	Tero Viheriäranta
11	FW	FIN	Jonathan Hyvärinen
12	MF	FIN	Topias Hänninen

No.	Pos.	Nation	Player
14	FW	TUN	Mike Tajini
15	MF	FIN	Jukka Markkanen
16	DF	FIN	Nico Siekkinen
18	DF	FRA	Didier Emmanuel
19	FW	FIN	Niko Saukkonen
20	MF	FIN	Juhani Koivuranta
21	FW	FIN	Kim Tallberg
22	MF	FIN	Jani Nuutinen
23	FW	FIN	Jonathan Korhonen
24	DF	FIN	Joni Ruuth
—	DF	MYA	Kyaw San Chit
32	GK	FIN	Jussi Hämäläinen

== References and sources ==
- Official Website
- Kuninkaat Website
- Laajasalon Palloseura 2 Website
- Finnish Wikipedia
- Suomen Cup
- Laajasalon Palloseura (LPS) Facebook
- Kuninkaat Facebook
- Laajasalon Palloseura Fan Club Ultras Facebook
