= Zenith Myllypuro =

Finnish football club

- Full name: Zenith Myllypuro
- Nickname: Zenith
- Founded: 1978
- Ground: Myllypuron hiekka, Helsinki, Finland
- Capacity: 500
- Chairman: Mikko Aitkoski
- Manager: Mikko Aitkoski
- League: Kolmonen
Home colours

Zenith Myllypuro (abbreviated Zenith) is a football club from Myllypuro, an eastern neighbourhood of Helsinki, Finland. The club was formed in 1978 and currently plays in the Kolmonen (Third Division), the fourth tier of Finnish football. The club's home ground is at the Myllypuron hiekka. Zenith also has a successful futsal team that competes in the First Division of the Finnish Futsal League.

== History ==
Zenith Myllypuro was founded in 1979 by a group of schoolmates at Myllypuro high school in eastern Helsinki. In those early years the club did not play competitively, but by the early 1980s Zenith had established itself in the lower divisions of the Finnish football league system serving the Helsinki area. The 1986 season proved a landmark when Zenith finally gained promotion to Division 4, the level the club played with few exceptions for more than 20 years.

The first Zenith generation's highlight was the training camp in Malta before the 1987 season. By accident, Zenith arranged to play against the Malta national team, eventually losing the game 11–1, but only after upsetting the host's Bulgarian team coach by equalising 1–1 in the first half. The game was noted also by the Finnish media after the team's return home, particularly when Malta just weeks later drew 2–2 with Portugal in the Euro 1988 qualification.

After 1991 season Zenith were relegated to Division 5, but bounced back immediately in the next season after which many of the first generation of players concentrated on Old Boys games. The second Zenith generation eventually achieved promotion for the club to Division 3 for the 1996 season, but the joy was short lived and the team was immediately relegated back to Division 4 after a disastrous time. Since 1997 Zenith have played in Division 4 until gaining promotion back to Division 3 at the end of the 2009 campaign.

The Finnish Futsal League was first played in the 1998–99 season. Zenith's path in the Finnish Futsal began in Autumn 2000, when the players decided that they needed some new challenges for the long winter. Their first two years in the local series proved to be much more successful than anticipated and the club secured the rights to play in the newly formed nationwide Division 1 for the 2002–03 season.

The first two seasons were a rollercoaster ride but since 2004 Zenith have been one of the most respected first division futsal teams in Finland, although blamed by some opponents for their defensive approach to the game.

The Zenith first team was joined by a second futsal team for the 2003–04 season and finally after the 2008–09 campaign the second team was able to earn a place in the second division for the 2009–10 season, establishing a solid foundation for the future in futsal.

In 2009 the club were honoured to be invited to Tallinn in Estonia to play FC Flora for the first international game in the Zenith's futsal history.

== Season to season ==
Season	Level	Division	Section	Administration	Position	Movements
2000	Tier 5	Nelonen (Fourth Division)	Section 4	Helsinki District (SPL Helsinki)	9th	
2001	Tier 5	Nelonen (Fourth Division)	Section 2	Helsinki District (SPL Helsinki)	5th	
2002	Tier 5	Nelonen (Fourth Division)	Section 1	Helsinki District (SPL Helsinki)	4th	
2003	Tier 5	Nelonen (Fourth Division)	Section 2	Helsinki District (SPL Helsinki)	8th	
2004	Tier 5	Nelonen (Fourth Division)	Section 2	Helsinki District (SPL Helsinki)	8th	
2005	Tier 5	Nelonen (Fourth Division)	Section 2	Helsinki District (SPL Helsinki)	9th	
2006	Tier 5	Nelonen (Fourth Division)	Section 2	Helsinki District (SPL Helsinki)	9th	
2007	Tier 5	Nelonen (Fourth Division)	Section 2	Helsinki District (SPL Helsinki)	4th	
2008	Tier 5	Nelonen (Fourth Division)	Section 1	Helsinki District (SPL Helsinki)	6th	
2009	Tier 5	Nelonen (Fourth Division)	Section 2	Helsinki District (SPL Helsinki)	1st	Promoted
2010	Tier 4	Kolmonen (Third Division)	Section 3	Helsinki & Uusimaa (SPL Uusimaa)	7th	

- 1 season in Kolmonen
- 10 season in Nelonen

== Club Structure ==
Zenith are a small club running 1 men's football team and 1 veteran's team. The club do not have a junior section. Zenith run 2 futsal teams during the winter season.

== 2010 season ==
Zenith are competing in Section 3 (Lohko 3) of the Kolmonen (Third Division) administered by the Helsinki SPL. This is the fourth highest tier in the Finnish football system. In 2009 the team finished in first place in Section 2 of the Nelonen (Fourth Division) and were promoted.

== References and sources ==
- Official Website
- Suomen Cup
