= Pajamäen Pallo-Veikot =

Finnish football club

PPV
- Full name: Pajamäen Pallo-Veikot
- Nicknames: Punainen pikajuna (Red Speed Train)
- Founded: 1969
- Ground: Talin liikuntapuisto, Helsinki, Finland
- Chairman: Antti Peltonen
- Manager: Perttu Salo
- League: Kolmonen
Home colours

Pajamäen Pallo-Veikot (abbreviated PPV) is a Helsinki-based football club centred on Pajamäki. The club was formed in 1969 and has a catchment covering the western Helsinki area. From the outset the development of junior football has been an important part of club activities. In the first decade of the new millennium the number of junior players has increased by over a hundred and there have been similar advancements at the adult level.

PPV are one of Helsinki's longest-running lower division clubs. For almost 40 years the PPV first team has been playing at the Kolmonen level and has experienced neither relegation or promotion. Their home ground is at the Talin urheilupuisto (Tali sports park).

== Season to season ==
Season	Level	Division	Section	Administration	Position	Movements
2000	Tier 4	Kolmonen (Third Division)	Section 1	Helsinki & Uusimaa (SPL Helsinki)	6th	
2001	Tier 4	Kolmonen (Third Division)	Section 1	Helsinki & Uusimaa (SPL Helsinki)	7th	
2002	Tier 4	Kolmonen (Third Division)	Section 3	Helsinki & Uusimaa (SPL Helsinki)	9th	
2003	Tier 4	Kolmonen (Third Division)	Section 3	Helsinki & Uusimaa (SPL Helsinki)	2nd	
2004	Tier 4	Kolmonen (Third Division)	Section 3	Helsinki & Uusimaa (SPL Helsinki)	5th	
2005	Tier 4	Kolmonen (Third Division)	Section 3	Helsinki & Uusimaa (SPL Helsinki)	5th	
2006	Tier 4	Kolmonen (Third Division)	Section 1	Helsinki & Uusimaa (SPL Uusimaa)	9th	
2007	Tier 4	Kolmonen (Third Division)	Section 2	Helsinki & Uusimaa (SPL Helsinki)	8th	
2008	Tier 4	Kolmonen (Third Division)	Section 1	Helsinki & Uusimaa (SPL Uusimaa)	6th	
2009	Tier 4	Kolmonen (Third Division)	Section 1	Helsinki & Uusimaa (SPL Uusimaa)	7th	
2010	Tier 4	Kolmonen (Third Division)	Section 1	Helsinki & Uusimaa (SPL Uusimaa)	10th	
2011	Tier 4	Kolmonen (Third Division)	Section 2	Helsinki & Uusimaa (SPL Uusimaa)	4th	
2012	Tier 4	Kolmonen (Third Division)	Section 2	Helsinki & Uusimaa (SPL Uusimaa)	9th	
2013	Tier 4	Kolmonen (Third Division)	Section 2	Helsinki & Uusimaa (SPL Uusimaa)	12th	Relegated
2014	Tier 5	Nelonen (Fourth Division)	Section 1	Helsinki District (SPL Helsinki)	12th	Relegated

- 14 seasons in Kolmonen
- 1 seasons in Nelonen

== Junior Development ==
The club has developed a large number of junior teams which participate in the National Youth League championships level and in the Helsinki Cup. A key objective of the club is to produce talented players for the club's own senior teams and provide a good starting point for youngsters to develop and make progress at a higher level.

== 2011 season ==
For the current season PPV are competing in Section 2 (Lohko 2) of the Kolmonen administered by the Helsinki SPL and Uusimaa SPL. This is the fourth highest tier in the Finnish football system.

PPV have two teams playing at the Vitonen level with PPV/2 participating in Section 3 (Lohko 3) and PPV/Seos in Section 1 (Lohko 1) administered by the Helsinki SPL.

== References and sources ==
- Official Website
- Finnish Wikipedia
- Suomen Cup
- PPV Facebook
