= Lehmon Pallo-77 =

Finnish football club

LehPa-77
- Full name: Lehmon Pallo-77
- Nickname(s): LehPa
- Founded: 1977
- Ground: Lehmon urheilukeskus Lehmo, Kontiolahti; Finland
- Chairman: Jukka Korpela
- Manager: Tero Vornanen
- Coach: Jarkko Siponen
- League: Kolmonen
Home colours	Away colours

Lehmon Pallo-77 (abbreviated LehPa) is a football club from Lehmo, Kontiolahti in Eastern Finland. The club was formed in 1977 and at one time was also active in volleyball and ice-hockey. The men's football first team currently plays in the Kolmonen (Third Division). Their home ground is at the Lehmon urheilukeskus.

== Background ==
LehPa-77 has spent many seasons in the lower divisions of the Finnish football league. They have played one season in the Kakkonen (Second Division), the third tier of Finnish football, in 2004. In the 1990s the club ran a Ladies Team which progressed as high as the Women's First Division.

The club from the outset has had an important role offering physical activity to Lehmo and the municipality of Kontiolahti and its villages. The club now has more than 200 registered players and makes full use of indoor and outdoor facilities in the Lehmo area.

== Season to season ==
Season	Level	Division	Section	Administration	Position	Movements
2002	Tier 4	Kolmonen (Third Division)		Eastern Finland (SPL Itä-Suomi)	6th	
2003	Tier 4	Kolmonen (Third Division)		Eastern Finland (SPL Itä-Suomi)	1st	Play-Offs – Promoted
2004	Tier 3	Kakkonen (Second Division)	East Group	Finnish FA (Suomen Pallolitto)	12th	Relegated
2005	Tier 4	Kolmonen (Third Division)		Eastern Finland (SPL Itä-Suomi)	8th	
2006	Tier 4	Kolmonen (Third Division)		Eastern Finland (SPL Itä-Suomi)	4th	
2007	Tier 4	Kolmonen (Third Division)		Eastern Finland (SPL Itä-Suomi)	7th	
2008	Tier 4	Kolmonen (Third Division)		Eastern Finland (SPL Itä-Suomi)	7th	Relegated
2009	Tier 5	Nelonen (Fourth Division)	Section A	Eastern Finland (SPL Itä-Suomi)	1st	Promoted
2010	Tier 4	Kolmonen (Third Division)		Eastern and Central Finland (SPL Itä-Suomi)		

- 1 season in Kakkonen
- 7 seasons in Kolmonen
- 1 season in Nelonen

== Club Structure ==
Lehmon Pallo −77 run a number of teams including 2 men's team, 7 boys teams and 1 girls team.

== 2010 season ==
LehPa-77 First Team are competing in the Kolmonen administered by the Itä-Suomi SPL and Keski-Suomi SPL. This is the fourth highest tier in the Finnish football system. In 2009 LehPa were promoted from Section A of the Nelonen administered by the Itä-Suomi SPL.

LehPa-77/2 are competing in the Vitonen administered by the Itä-Suomi SPL.

== References and sources ==
- Official Club Website
- Finnish Wikipedia
