= Rakuunat =

Finnish football club

Logo

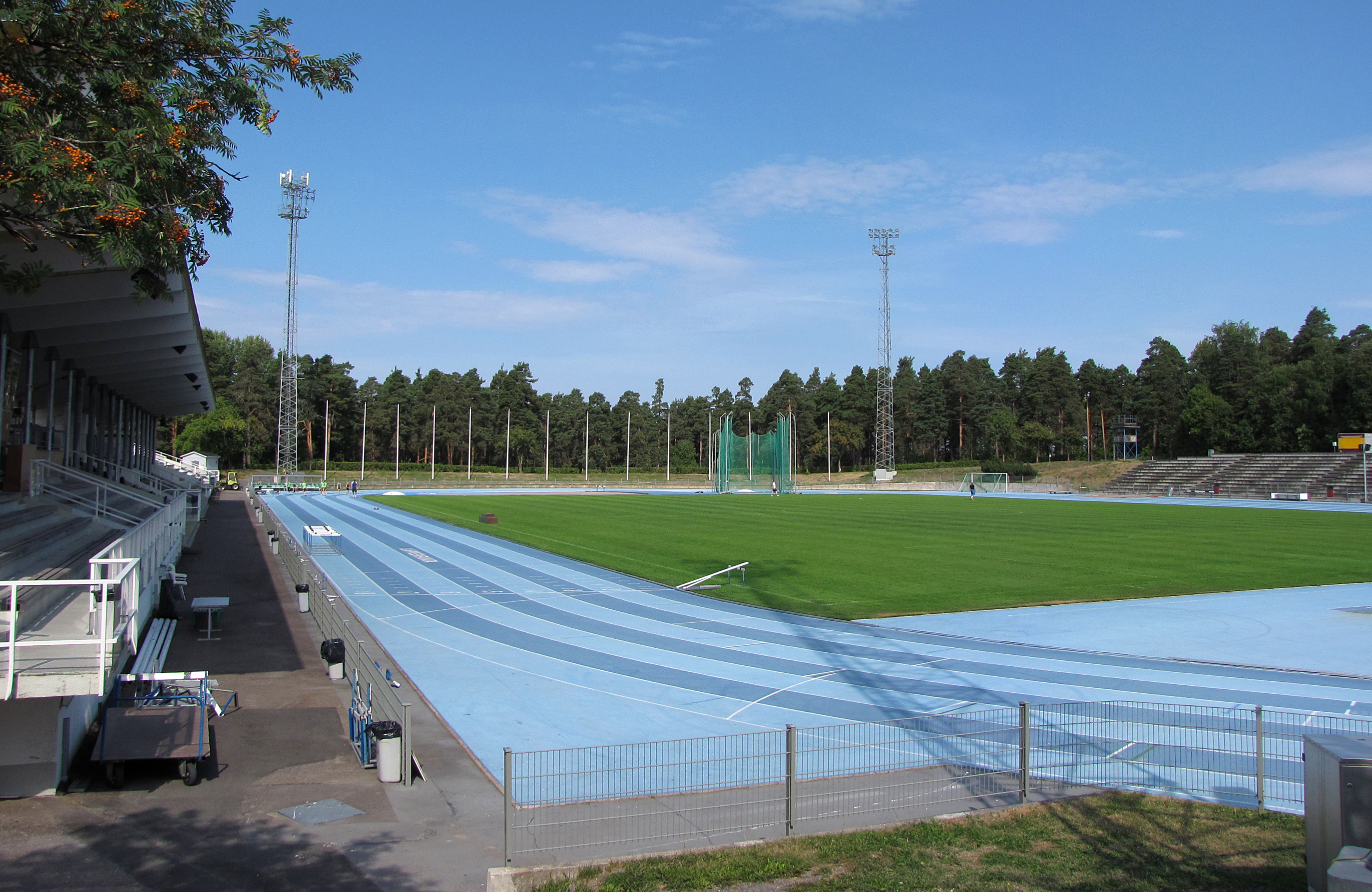
Kimpisen urheilukeskus

Jalkapalloseura Rakuunat was a Finnish football club, based in Lappeenranta.

== History ==
Rakuunat was founded in 1992 as FC Lappeenranta after a merger of the first teams of LaPa and LauTP, the city's traditional clubs. The new club took LaPa's place in the Finnish 2nd division (third highest level) and was renamed to Rakuunat (a reference to Lappeenranta's military history and its dragoons) in 1994.

Rakuunat played in the 1st division between 1995–1996 and 2000–2006, and in the 2nd division between 1992 and 1994, 1997–1999 and 2007–2008. In 2001 they placed second in the southern group of the 1st division and took part in premier division promotion playoffs where they lost to FC Hämeenlinna 4–0 in aggregate. In 2008 they were relegated to 3rd division, and after subsequently being expelled from the Finnish FA due to unpaid fees in April 2009 the club folded.

Rakuunat played its home matches at Kimpinen.
