= Riihimäen Ilves =

Finnish football club

- Full name: Riihimäen Ilves
- Nickname(s): RIlves
- Founded: 1970; 55 years ago
- Ground: Riihimäen Pallokenttä, Riihimäki, Finland
- Chairman: Eero Hynynen
- Coach: Jukka Mäkelä
- League: Kolmonen
Home colours	Away colours

Riihimäen Ilves (abbreviated RIlves) is a football club from Riihimäki, Finland which was. The club was formed in 1970. The men's football first team currently plays in the Kolmonen (Third Division) and their home ground is at the Riihimäen Pallokenttä.

== Background ==
Riihimäen Ilves has traditionally been the second club in Riihimäki and until 2001 trailed in the wake of Riihimäen Palloseuran (RiPS). RIlves was founded as a sister organisation on 18 January 1970 and the club's first chairman was Sakari Harjanne. In those early days RIlves was initially run as a joint venture with RiPS with a joint executive board. The new club played in the lower divisions of the Finnish football league but by 1986 had ceased to function. In 1993 the club played in the Nelonen (Fourth Division) but ceased operations again in 1994.

The situation changed dramatically in 2001 when RiPS were forced to withdraw from sporting activities because of financial difficulties. Riihimäen Ilves represented the only hope for football in Riihimäki and under the management of a new board the club began to make progress gaining promotion from the Vitonen (Fifth Division) in 2001 and Nelonen (Fourth Division) in 2002. The club played in the Kolmonen (Third Division) from 2003 until the end of the 2008 season when they were relegated. However RIlves won their section in the Nelonen (Fourth Division) in 2009 and are currently back in the Kolmonen (Third Division).

Rilves has a total of around 250 members and is the leading presence in Riihimäki football. The second club in the town is Riihimäen Sarvet and youngest age groups are well supported by the Riihimäen Nappulaseuraa (RiNS) club.

== Season to season ==
Season	Level	Division	Section	Administration	Position	Movements
2001	Tier 6	Vitonen (Fifth Division)	Section 2	Uusimaa District (SPL Uusimaa)	2nd	Promoted
2002	Tier 5	Nelonen (Fourth Division)	Section 2	Uusimaa District (SPL Uusimaa)	2nd	Promoted
2003	Tier 4	Kolmonen (Third Division)	Section 3	Helsinki & Uusimaa (SPL Helsinki)	4th	
2004	Tier 4	Kolmonen (Third Division)	Section 3	Helsinki & Uusimaa (SPL Helsinki)	10th	
2005	Tier 4	Kolmonen (Third Division)	Section 2	Helsinki & Uusimaa (SPL Uusimaa)	3rd	
2006	Tier 4	Kolmonen (Third Division)	Section 2	Helsinki & Uusimaa (SPL Uusimaa)	3rd	
2007	Tier 4	Kolmonen (Third Division)	Section 2	Helsinki & Uusimaa (SPL Helsinki)	6th	
2008	Tier 4	Kolmonen (Third Division)	Section 3	Helsinki & Uusimaa (SPL Helsinki)	12th	Relegated
2009	Tier 5	Nelonen (Fourth Division)	Section 1	Uusimaa District (SPL Uusimaa)	1st	Promoted
2010	Tier 4	Kolmonen (Third Division)	Section 3	Helsinki & Uusimaa (SPL Uusimaa)	10th	

- 7 seasons in Kolmonen
- 2 seasons in Nelonen
- 1 season in Vitonen

== Club Structure ==
Riihimäen Ilves run a number of teams including 2 men's teams, 1 ladies teams, 7 boys teams and 3 girls teams. During the winter months the club make use of the indoor training facilities at the Valio-Areena. The Hall is 70 metres long by 45 metres wide.

== 2010 season ==
RIlves Men's Team are competing in Section 3 (Lohko 3) of the Kolmonen administered by the Uusimaa SPL. This is the fourth highest tier in the Finnish football system. In 2009 RIlves finished in 1st place in Section 1 (Lohko 1) of the Nelonen and were promoted.

RIlves / 2 are competing in Section 4 (Lohko 4) of the Vitonen (Fifth Division) administered by the Uusimaa SPL.

== References and Sources ==
- Official Website
- Finnish Wikipedia
- Suomen Cup
