= IF Sibbo-Vargarna =

Finnish sports club

- Full name: IF Sibbo-Vargarna
- Nickname: SibboV
- Founded: 1928
- Ground: Nikkilän keskusnurmi, Sipoo, Finland
- Chairman: Mikael Åhl
- Manager: Jan Söderlund
- Coach: Jouni Arjaranta; Joni Turunen; Harri Laine
- League: Kolmonen
Home colours

IF Sibbo-Vargarna (abbreviated SibboV) is a sports club from Sipoo, Finland specialising in football, cycling, athletics, volleyball, skiing, orienteering, dancing, and fitness. The club was formed in 1928 and its main home ground is at the Nikkilän keskusnurmi. The men's football first team currently plays in the Kolmonen (Third Division).

== Background ==
SibboV has spent many seasons in the lower divisions of the Finnish football league. For much of the last decade the club has oscillated between the Nelonen (Fourth Division) and the Kolmonen (Third Division). They have enjoyed a "yo-yo" existence with promotions from the Nelonen in 2001, 2005 and 2009 and immediate relegations from the Kolmonen in 2002 and 2006. In order to keep their spot in the fourth division, SibboV is displaying more steadiness in the 2010 season.

== Season to season ==
Season	Level	Division	Section	Administration	Position	Movements
2001	Tier 5	Nelonen (Fourth Division)	Section 4	Uusimaa District (SPL Uusimaa)	1st	Promoted
2002	Tier 4	Kolmonen (Third Division)	Section 2	Helsinki & Uusimaa (SPL Uusimaa)	11th	Relegated
2003	Tier 5	Nelonen (Fourth Division)	Section 2	Uusimaa District (SPL Uusimaa)	3rd	
2004	Tier 5	Nelonen (Fourth Division)	Section 2	Uusimaa District (SPL Uusimaa)	3rd	
2005	Tier 5	Nelonen (Fourth Division)	Section 2	Uusimaa District (SPL Uusimaa)	1st	Promoted
2006	Tier 4	Kolmonen (Third Division)	Section 2	Helsinki & Uusimaa (SPL Helsinki)	12th	Relegated
2007	Tier 5	Nelonen (Fourth Division)	Section 2	Uusimaa District (SPL Uusimaa)	5th	
2008	Tier 5	Nelonen (Fourth Division)	Section 2	Uusimaa District (SPL Uusimaa)	3rd	
2009	Tier 5	Nelonen (Fourth Division)	Section 2	Uusimaa District (SPL Uusimaa)	2nd	Promoted
2010	Tier 4	Kolmonen (Third Division)	Section 2	Helsinki & Uusimaa (SPL Helsinki)	10th	
2011	Tier 4	Kolmonen (Third Division)	Section 2	Helsinki & Uusimaa (SPL Helsinki)	9th	
2012	Tier 4	Kolmonen (Third Division)	Section 2	Helsinki & Uusimaa (SPL Helsinki)	8th	
2013	Tier 4	Kolmonen (Third Division)	Section 2	Helsinki & Uusimaa (SPL Uusimaa)	10th	
2014	Tier 4	Kolmonen (Third Division)	Section 2	Helsinki & Uusimaa (SPL Helsinki)	5th	
2015	Tier 4	Kolmonen (Third Division)	Section 2	Helsinki & Uusimaa (SPL Uusimaa)	8th	
2016	Tier 4	Kolmonen (Third Division)	Section 2	Helsinki & Uusimaa (SPL Uusimaa)	9th	
2017	Tier 4	Kolmonen (Third Division)	Section 2	Helsinki & Uusimaa (SPL Uusimaa)	10th	
2018	Tier 4	Kolmonen (Third Division)	Section 2	Helsinki & Uusimaa (SPL Uusimaa)	12th	Relegated
2019	Tier 5	Nelonen (Fourth Division)	Group 4	Uusimaa District (SPL Uusimaa)	12th	Relegated
2020	Tier 6	Vitonen (Fifth Division)	Group 5	South (SPL Etelä)	11th	
2021	Tier 6	Vitonen (Fifth Division)	Group 7	South (SPL Etelä)	1st	Promoted

- 9 seasons in Kolmonen
- 7 seasons in Nelonen
- 2 seasons in Vitonen

== Club Structure ==
IF Sibbo-Vargarna run a large number of teams including 3 men's teams, 1 ladies team, 1 Futsal team, 3 veteran's teams (Oldtimers), 10 boys teams and 8 girls teams.

== 2010 season ==
SibboV Men's Team are competing in Section 2 (Lohko 2) of the Kolmonen administered by the Helsinki SPL and Uusimaa SPL. This is the fourth highest tier in the Finnish football system. In 2009 SibboV finished in 2nd place in Section 2 (Lohko 2) of the Nelonen and were promoted.

SibboV /2 are participating in Section 3 (Lohko 3) of the Vitonen administered by the Uusimaa SPL.

== Current squad ==
as of 4 February 2015 Note: Flags indicate national team as defined under FIFA eligibility rules; some limited exceptions apply. Players may hold more than one non-FIFA nationality.

No.	Pos.	Nation	Player
1	GK	FIN	Tommi Lindqvist
90	GK	FIN	Joni Perttilä
9	DF	FIN	Marko Hanninen
16	DF	FIN	Markus Rouhiainen
20	DF	FIN	Tero Jokimäki
32	DF	FIN	Atte Elf
-	DF	FIN	Henri Nokelainen
11	DF	FIN	Pekka Kartala
18	DF	FIN	Valdemar Sandell
23	DF	FIN	Miika Turunen
38	DF	FIN	Juho Ihalainen

No.	Pos.	Nation	Player
2	MF	FIN	Toni Pohjansaro
8	MF	FIN	Ali Aouni
26	MF	FIN	Alexander Nybonn
29	MF	FIN	Joakim Uuttana
4	MF	FIN	Tommi Bergström
22	MF	FIN	Tuomo Savukoski
27	MF	FIN	Toni Paukkeri
31	MF	FIN	Niko Pimiä
37	FW	FIN	Jyri Brunou
15	FW	FIN	Niko Sved
13	FW	FIN	Joni Turunen

== Sources ==
- Finnish Wikipedia
- Suomen Cup
