= Tervakosken Pato =

Finnish football club

- Full name: Tervakosken Pato
- Nickname(s): Pato
- Founded: 1902
- Ground: Tervakosken urheilukenttä, Tervakoski, Janakkala, Finland
- Chairman: Esko Kaleva
- Coach: Tommi Söder
- League: Kolmonen
Home colours

Tervakosken Pato (abbreviated Pato) is a football club from Tervakoski, Janakkala, Finland. The club was formed in 1902 and their home ground is at the Tervakosken urheilukenttä. The men's first team currently plays in the Kolmonen (Third Division).

== Background ==
In the 1970s the club played in the lower levels of Finnish football (in Divisions 4 and 5) but over the last thirty years Pato has competed mainly in the Kolmonen (Division 3).

== Season to season ==
Season	Level	Division	Section	Administration	Position	Movements
2000	Tier 4	Kolmonen (Third Division)	Section 3	Helsinki & Uusimaa (SPL Uusimaa)	3rd	
2001	Tier 4	Kolmonen (Third Division)	Section 3	Helsinki & Uusimaa (SPL Helsinki)	3rd	
2002	Tier 4	Kolmonen (Third Division)	Section 3	Helsinki & Uusimaa (SPL Helsinki)	4th	
2003	Tier 4	Kolmonen (Third Division)	Section 3	Helsinki & Uusimaa (SPL Helsinki)	6th	
2004	Tier 4	Kolmonen (Third Division)	Section 3	Helsinki & Uusimaa (SPL Helsinki)	2nd	
2005	Tier 4	Kolmonen (Third Division)	Section 2	Helsinki & Uusimaa (SPL Uusimaa)	6th	
2006	Tier 4	Kolmonen (Third Division)	Section 2	Helsinki & Uusimaa (SPL Uusimaa)	4th	
2007	Tier 4	Kolmonen (Third Division)		Tampere District (SPL Tampere)	7th	
2008	Tier 4	Kolmonen (Third Division)		Tampere District (SPL Tampere)	7th	
2009	Tier 4	Kolmonen (Third Division)		Tampere District (SPL Tampere)	9th	
2010	Tier 4	Kolmonen (Third Division)		Tampere District (SPL Tampere)		

- 11 seasons in Kolmonen

== Club structure ==
Tervakosken Pato run a number of teams including 2 men's teams, 2 men's veterans team, 5 boys teams and 2 girls teams.

== 2010 season ==
Pato Men's Team are competing in the Kolmonen section administered by the Tampere SPL. This is the fourth highest tier in the Finnish football system. In 2009 Pato finished in ninth place in the Kolmonen.

Pato 2 are participating in Section 1 (Lohko 1) of the Kutonen administered by the Tampere SPL.

== References and sources ==
- Official Website
- Finnish Wikipedia
- Suomen Cup
