= FC Rauma =

Finnish football club

- Full name: Football Club Rauma
- Nickname: FCR
- Founded: 1996; 29 years ago
- Ground: Äijänsuon stadion, Rauma, Finland
- Capacity: 800
- Chairman: Jaana Österman
- Head Coach: Esa Viitanen
- Coach: Lauri Gustafsson
- League: Kolmonen
Home colours	Away colours

FC Rauma (abbreviated FCR) is a football club from Rauma, Finland. The club was formed in 1996 and their home ground is at the Äijänsuon stadion. The men's first team currently plays in the Kolmonen (Third Division).

== Background ==
FCR was established on 26 November 1996 as a result of the merger of the Rauman NMKY, Rauman Kisa-Veljet and Uotilan Työväen Urheilijat clubs. The biggest problem in establishing the new club was that the existing clubs had to abandon their constitutions along with their history and activities. Uotilan Työväen Urheilijat (UTU) had the longest history of almost 50 years while the other clubs were each over 30 years old. FCR began their competitive life in 1997 by taking the place of UTU in the Kolmonen (Third Division).

Following their early years in the Kolmonen (Third Division), the club have spent four seasons in the third tier of Finnish football, the Kakkonen (Second Division) from 2001 to 2004. At the end of the 2004 season FCR were relegated back to the Kolmonen (Third Division) where the club have resided ever since.

A notable achievement took place in 2002 when FC Rauma finished third in the West Group of the Kakkonen (Second Division) which represents their highest ever position. They were also five places higher than local rivals Pallo-Iirot.

== Season to season ==
Season	Level	Division	Section	Administration	Position	Movements
2000	Tier 4	Kolmonen (Third Division)		Satakunta District (SPL Satakunta)	1st	Promoted
2001	Tier 3	Kakkonen (Second Division)	West Group	Finnish FA (Suomen Pallolitto)	9th	
2002	Tier 3	Kakkonen (Second Division)	West Group	Finnish FA (Suomen Pallolitto)	3rd	
2003	Tier 3	Kakkonen (Second Division)	West Group	Finnish FA (Suomen Pallolitto)	9th	
2004	Tier 3	Kakkonen (Second Division)	West Group	Finnish FA (Suomen Pallolitto)	12th	Relegated
2005	Tier 4	Kolmonen (Third Division)		Satakunta District (SPL Satakunta)	1st	Play-offs
2006	Tier 4	Kolmonen (Third Division)		Satakunta District (SPL Satakunta)	3rd	
2007	Tier 4	Kolmonen (Third Division)		Satakunta District (SPL Satakunta)	3rd	
2008	Tier 4	Kolmonen (Third Division)		Satakunta District (SPL Satakunta)	4th	
2009	Tier 4	Kolmonen (Third Division)		Satakunta District (SPL Satakunta)	4th	
2010	Tier 4	Kolmonen (Third Division)		Satakunta District (SPL Satakunta)	1st	

- 4 season in Kakkonen
- 7 seasons in Kolmonen

== Club structure ==
FC Rauma run a large number of teams including 1 men's team, 1 ladies team, 1 men's veterans team, 7 boys' teams and 5 girls' teams. At the beginning of January 2010 the club had 245 registered players.

Every team trains all the year round. In Summer the younger players train at the Monna field and the older youngsters and adults at the Äijänsuo Stadium. During Winter the club use the excellent indoor facilities in the Äijänsuo area and the premises at local school buildings.

Besides the work with the teams the club have a special group for goalkeepers and a development group for talented juniors. In total the club has 25 junior coaches.

== References and sources ==
- Official Website
- Suomen Cup
