= Savonlinnan Työväen Palloseura =

Finnish football club

STPS
- Full name: Savonlinnan Työväen Palloseura r.y.
- Nickname(s): STPS
- Founded: 1947; 78 years ago
- Ground: Kyrönniemen kenttä Savonlinna; Finland
- Capacity: 1000
- Chairman: Jukka Nokelainen
- Head Coach: Kai Koikkalainen
- League: Kolmonen (South-East Finland)
Home colours	Away colours

Savonlinnan Työväen Palloseura or STPS for short, is a football club located in Savonlinna, Finland. The club was founded in 1947. STPS has a strong labour movement background, "työväen palloseura" meaning "workers ball club" in Finnish.

This traditional club has 650 active members which makes STPS the largest sport group in the city of Savonlinna. The club hosts many youth and women's teams. The women's futsal team won the Finnish championship in 2005.

STPS is currently playing in South-Eastern Finland's Kolmonen (the 4th highest tier in the Finnish football system).

== History ==
The men's team played under the name of Estura from 1979 to 1980 and under the name FC Savonlinna in the 1990s. The club has enjoyed 9 seasons in the Kakkonen (Second Division), the third tier of Finnish Football, in 1974–75, 1977–80, 1991 and 1994–1995.

== Season to season ==
Season	Level	Division	Section	Administration	Position	Movements
2002	Tier 4	Kolmonen (Third Division)		South-East Finland (SPL Kaakkois-Suomi)	2nd	
2003	Tier 4	Kolmonen (Third Division)		South-East Finland (SPL Kaakkois-Suomi)	5th	Edustus STPS
2004	Tier 4	Kolmonen (Third Division)		South-East Finland (SPL Kaakkois-Suomi)	2nd	
2005	Tier 4	Kolmonen (Third Division)		South-East Finland (SPL Kaakkois-Suomi)	4th	
2006	Tier 4	Kolmonen (Third Division)		South-East Finland (SPL Kaakkois-Suomi)	7th	
2007	Tier 4	Kolmonen (Third Division)		South-East Finland (SPL Kaakkois-Suomi)	9th	
2008	Tier 4	Kolmonen (Third Division)		South-East Finland (SPL Kaakkois-Suomi)	7th	
2009	Tier 4	Kolmonen (Third Division)		South-East Finland (SPL Kaakkois-Suomi)	5th	
2010	Tier 4	Kolmonen (Third Division)		South-East Finland (SPL Kaakkois-Suomi)	4th	
2011	Tier 4	Kolmonen (Third Division)		South-East Finland (SPL Kaakkois-Suomi)	2nd	

- 8 seasons in Kolmonen

== Club Structure ==
STPS run 2 men's teams, a men's veterans team and 9 boys teams. In addition, the Mertalan Pallo, Karvilan Kivekkäät, FC Anttola and Rantasalmen Urheilijat clubs form part of the STPS structure. The club also run a Nappulaliiga for youngsters.

== 2010 season ==
STPS Men's Team competed in the Kolmonen (Third Division) administered by the Kaakkois-Suomi SPL. This is the fourth-highest tier in the Finnish football system. In 2009, STPS finished in fifth place in the Kolmonen.

STPS/2 participated in the Nelonen (Fourth Division) administered by the Kaakkois-Suomi SPL. In 2009, they were promoted from North Section of the Vitonen.

== References and sources ==
- Official Website
- First Team Website
- Finnish Wikipedia
- Suomen Cup
- STPS-edustus Facebook
