= HooGee =

Finnish football club

Haukilahden Pallo
- Full name: Haukilahden Pallo
- Nickname(s): HooGee
- Founded: 1980
- Ground: Matinkylän Uusi Tekonurmi, Espoo, Finland
- Chairman: Janne Maijala
- Manager: Andres Puolakainen
- League: Kolmonen
Home colours	Away colours

Previous logo

HooGee or Haukilahden Pallo – Gäddviks Boll HooGee is a Finnish football club established in 1980. The club is based in the district of Haukilahti in the city of Espoo and specialises in youth football. HooGee draws its membership base mainly from the Westend-Haukilahti-Niittykumpu-Tontunmäki area but others are also welcome.

The Club runs several junior teams and aims to provide boys and girls from Espoo with the opportunity to practice football. HooGee participates in the city of Espoo and the Uusimaa district's leagues, tournaments, and organises football schools, camps and various theme days. With four men's teams in addition to the youth section, the club in total has over 800 active members.

HooGee's name stands for Haukilahti (= Hoo) followed by the Swedish counterpart Gäddvik (= Gee).

== Season to season ==
Season	Level	Division	Section	Administration	Position	Movements
1998	Tier 6	Vitonen (Fifth Division)	Section 2	Uusimaa District (SPL Uusimaa)	5th	
1999	Tier 6	Vitonen (Fifth Division)	Section 2	Uusimaa District (SPL Uusimaa)	8th	
2000	Tier 6	Vitonen (Fifth Division)	Section 3	Uusimaa District (SPL Uusimaa)	4th	
2001	Tier 6	Vitonen (Fifth Division)	Section 3	Uusimaa District (SPL Uusimaa)	5th	
2002	Tier 6	Vitonen (Fifth Division)	Section 3	Uusimaa District (SPL Uusimaa)	8th	
2003	Tier 6	Vitonen (Fifth Division)	Section 1	Uusimaa District (SPL Uusimaa)	3rd	
2004	Tier 6	Vitonen (Fifth Division)	Section 1	Uusimaa District (SPL Uusimaa)	7th	
2005	Tier 6	Vitonen (Fifth Division)	Section 1	Uusimaa District (SPL Uusimaa)	1st	Promoted
2006	Tier 5	Nelonen (Fourth Division)	Section 1	Uusimaa District (SPL Uusimaa)	5th	
2007	Tier 5	Nelonen (Fourth Division)	Section 1	Uusimaa District (SPL Uusimaa)	6th	
2008	Tier 5	Nelonen (Fourth Division)	Section 1	Uusimaa District (SPL Uusimaa)	10th	Relegated
2009	Tier 6	Vitonen (Fifth Division)	Section 2	Uusimaa District (SPL Uusimaa)	2nd	Promoted
2010	Tier 5	Nelonen (Fourth Division)	Section 1	Uusimaa District (SPL Uusimaa)	8th	
2011	Tier 5	Nelonen (Fourth Division)	Section 2	Uusimaa District (SPL Uusimaa)	*11th	

- 4 seasons in Nelonen
- 9 seasons in Vitonen

- = current position

== 2010 season ==
HooGee M1 managed to secure a place in Nelonen after beating LePa 2–1 away in Leppävaara in their final match of the season, thus finishing 8th, after collecting 25 points in 20 matches. In the Uusimaa Cup they managed to make it to the final eight, before dropping out to Akilles from Porvoo. In the Finnish Cup they lost to NJS from Nurmijärvi 9–1 in the first round of the competition.

HooGee 2 managed to secure themselves top spot in Section 1 in Kutonen administered by the SPL Uusimaa, thus gaining themselves promotion back to [Vitonen] after only one season.

HooGee finished third in Section 1 of the Vitonen administered by the SPL Uusimaa.

HooGee 4 finished third in Section 2 of the Vitonen administered by the SPL Uusimaa.

== 2011 season ==
HooGee M1 will compete in Nelonen for the 2011 season, while the other three HooGee men's teams will compete in Vitonen.

Finnish Cup

HooGee M1 and HooGee competed in the 2011 edition of the Finnish Cup, with both teams receiving byes to the second round of the competition. HooGee M1 faced fellow Nelonen outfit Lahden Pojat JS with the team from Lahti progressing to the 3rd round after beating the home team 4–0. HooGee also bowed out of the 2011 Finnish Cup in the second round after losing 6–1 to Apollo from Hyvinkää.

== The other teams ==
Season to Season

Season	Team	Level	Division	Section	Administration	Position	Movements
1998	HooGee 2	Tier 7	Kutonen (Sixth Division)	Section 2	Uusimaa District (SPL Uusimaa)	6th	
1999	HooGee 2	Tier 7	Kutonen (Sixth Division)	Section 2	Uusimaa District (SPL Uusimaa)	-	Withdrew
	HooGee 3	Tier 7	Kutonen (Sixth Division)	Section 3	Uusimaa District (SPL Uusimaa)	3rd	
2000	HooGee 2	Tier 7	Kutonen (Sixth Division)	Section 3	Uusimaa District (SPL Uusimaa)	5th	
2001	HooGee 2	Tier 7	Kutonen (Sixth Division)	Section 3	Uusimaa District (SPL Uusimaa)	1st	Promoted
2002	HooGee 2	Tier 6	Vitonen (Fifth Division)	Section 1	Uusimaa District (SPL Uusimaa)	2nd	Promoted
	HooGee 3	Tier 7	Kutonen (Sixth Division)	Section 3	Uusimaa District (SPL Uusimaa)	7th	
2003	HooGee 2	Tier 5	Nelonen (Fourth Division)	Section 1	Uusimaa District (SPL Uusimaa)	9th	
	HooGee 3	Tier 7	Kutonen (Sixth Division)	Section 3	Uusimaa District (SPL Uusimaa)	8th	
2004	HooGee 2	Tier 5	Nelonen (Fourth Division)	Section 1	Uusimaa District (SPL Uusimaa)	12th	Relegated
	HooGee 3	Tier 7	Kutonen (Sixth Division)	Section 2	Uusimaa District (SPL Uusimaa)	4th	
2005	HooGee 2	Tier 6	Vitonen (Fifth Division)	Section 2	Uusimaa District (SPL Uusimaa)	2nd	
	HooGee 3	Tier 7	Kutonen (Sixth Division)	Section 2	Uusimaa District (SPL Uusimaa)	2nd	Promoted
2006	HooGee 2	Tier 6	Vitonen (Fifth Division)	Section 1	Uusimaa District (SPL Uusimaa)	5th	
	HooGee 3	Tier 6	Vitonen (Fifth Division)	Section 3	Uusimaa District (SPL Uusimaa)	4th	
2007	HooGee 2	Tier 6	Vitonen (Fifth Division)	Section 2	Uusimaa District (SPL Uusimaa)	5th	
	HooGee 3	Tier 6	Vitonen (Fifth Division)	Section 2	Uusimaa District (SPL Uusimaa)	3rd	
2008	HooGee 2	Tier 6	Vitonen (Fifth Division)	Section 1	Uusimaa District (SPL Uusimaa)	8th	
	HooGee 3	Tier 6	Vitonen (Fifth Division)	Section 2	Uusimaa District (SPL Uusimaa)	1st	Promoted
	HooGee 4	Tier 7	Kutonen (Sixth Division)	Section 1	Uusimaa District (SPL Uusimaa)	7th	
2009	HooGee 2	Tier 6	Vitonen (Fifth Division)	Section 1	Uusimaa District (SPL Uusimaa)	9th	Relegated
	HooGee 3	Tier 5	Nelonen (Fourth Division)	Section 1	Uusimaa District (SPL Uusimaa)	10th	Relegated
	HooGee 4	Tier 7	Kutonen (Sixth Division)	Section 2	Uusimaa District (SPL Uusimaa)	2nd	Promoted
2010	HooGee 2	Tier 7	Kutonen (Sixth Division)	Section 1	Uusimaa District (SPL Uusimaa)	1st	Promoted
	HooGee	Tier 6	Vitonen (Fifth Division)	Section 1	Uusimaa District (SPL Uusimaa)	3rd	
	HooGee 4	Tier 6	Vitonen (Fifth Division)	Section 2	Uusimaa District (SPL Uusimaa)	3rd	
2011	HooGee 2	Tier 6	Vitonen (Fifth Division)	Section 1	Uusimaa District (SPL Uusimaa)	*4th	
	HooGee	Tier 6	Vitonen (Fifth Division)	Section 2	Uusimaa District (SPL Uusimaa)	*6th	
	HooGee 4	Tier 6	Vitonen (Fifth Division)	Section 3	Uusimaa District (SPL Uusimaa)	*6th	
2015	Hoogee 2	Tier 5	Nelonen (Fourth Division)	Section 1	Uusimaa District (SPL Uusimaa)	3rd	
	HooGee	Tier 6	Vitonen (Fifth Division)	Section 2	Uusimaa District (SPL Uusimaa)	10th	Relegated

- = currently placed

HooGee 2, 12 seasons

- 2 seasons in Nelonen
- 6 seasons in Vitonen
- 4 seasons in Kutonen

HooGee (3), 10 seasons

- 1 season in Nelonen
- 4 seasons in Vitonen
- 5 seasons in Kutonen

HooGee 4, 3 seasons

- 1 season in Vitonen
- 2 seasons in Kutonen
