= Euran Pallo =

Finnish football club

- Full name: Euran Pallo
- Nickname: EuPa
- Founded: 1954; 72 years ago
- Ground: Euran Wembley, Eura, Finland
- Chairman: Jaana Kuusilehto
- Coach: Mikko Kärki (Finland) Sam Fagerlund
- League: Kolmonen
Home colours

Euran Pallo (abbreviated EuPa) is a football club from Eura, Finland. The club was formed in 1954 and their home ground is at the Euran Wembley. The men's first team currently plays in the Kolmonen (Third Division).

== Background ==
Euran Pallo was established in 1954 by taking over the football section of the existing Euran Raiku sports club.

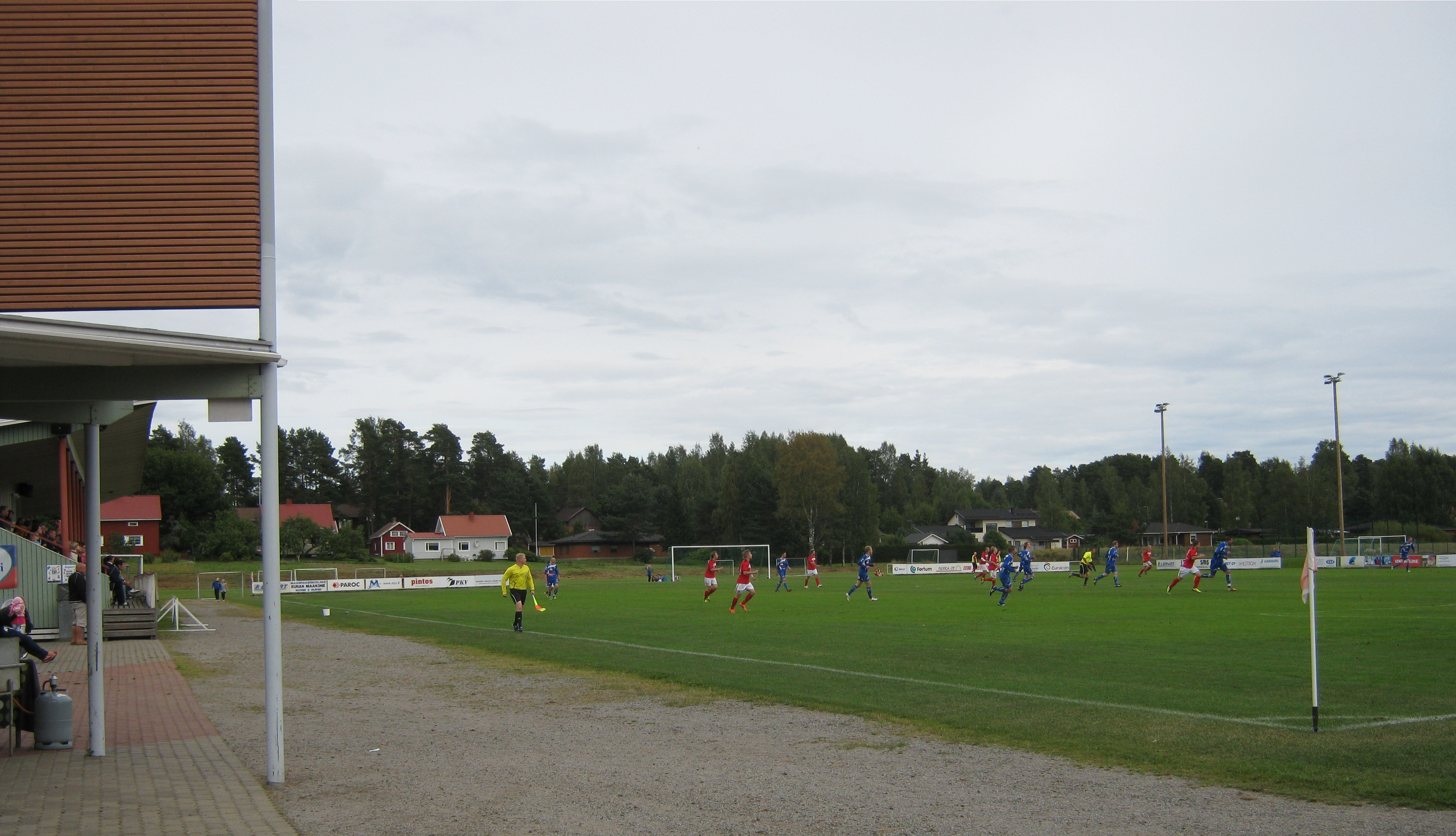
EuPa vs Ilves-Kissat, 2012.

EuPa spent many seasons in the lower divisions of the Finnish football league in their early history. However the club's fortunes changed dramatically at the end of the 1990 season when EuPa gained promotion to the Kakkonen (Second Division) for the first time. There followed the best period in the club's history with 10 consecutive seasons in the third tier of Finnish football, the Kakkonen (Second Division) from 1991 to 2000. The club then dropped back into the Kolmonen (Third Division) in 2001 where they have stayed for the last decade with the exception of a short-lived season in the Kakkonen in 2004. It is not proving easy for EuPa to regain their previous status as they have finished in second place in 4 of the last 5 seasons.

EuPa play their home matches at the "Euran Wembley" adjacent to the artificial turf pitch at the OP-Areena. The home attendance record for a EuPa match is 1,452 spectators who attended a Round 7 Finnish Cup match against RoPS in 1990.

The most famous players to have turned out in EuPa's colours are Ari Valvee, the former Finnish international and Micah Hyde.

Previous logo

== Season to season ==
Season	Level	Division	Section	Administration	Position	Movements
1994	Tier 3	Kakkonen (Second Division)	West Group	Finnish FA (Suomen Pallolitto)	7th	
1995	Tier 3	Kakkonen (Second Division)	West Group	Finnish FA (Suomen Pallolitto)	2nd	
1996	Tier 3	Kakkonen (Second Division)	West Group	Finnish FA (Suomen Pallolitto)	5th	
1997	Tier 3	Kakkonen (Second Division)	South Group	Finnish FA (Suomen Pallolitto)	4th	
1998	Tier 3	Kakkonen (Second Division)	South Group	Finnish FA (Suomen Pallolitto)	5th	
1999	Tier 3	Kakkonen (Second Division)	West Group	Finnish FA (Suomen Pallolitto)	4th	
2000	Tier 3	Kakkonen (Second Division)	West Group	Finnish FA (Suomen Pallolitto)	12th	Relegated
2001	Tier 4	Kolmonen (Third Division)		Satakunta District (SPL Satakunta)	6th	
2002	Tier 4	Kolmonen (Third Division)		Satakunta District (SPL Satakunta)	1st	Play-offs
2003	Tier 4	Kolmonen (Third Division)		Satakunta District (SPL Satakunta)	1st	Promoted
2004	Tier 3	Kakkonen (Second Division)	West Group	Finnish FA (Suomen Pallolitto)	11th	Relegated
2005	Tier 4	Kolmonen (Third Division)		Satakunta District (SPL Satakunta)	2nd	
2006	Tier 4	Kolmonen (Third Division)		Satakunta District (SPL Satakunta)	2nd	
2007	Tier 4	Kolmonen (Third Division)		Satakunta District (SPL Satakunta)	2nd	
2008	Tier 4	Kolmonen (Third Division)		Satakunta District (SPL Satakunta)	3rd	
2009	Tier 4	Kolmonen (Third Division)		Satakunta District (SPL Satakunta)	2nd	
2010	Tier 4	Kolmonen (Third Division)		Satakunta District (SPL Satakunta)	3rd	
2011	Tier 4	Kolmonen (Third Division)		Satakunta District/Tampere District (SPL Satakunta/SPL Tampere)	4th	
2012	Tier 4	Kolmonen (Third Division)		Satakunta District/Tampere District (SPL Satakunta/SPL Tampere)	8th	

- 8 seasons in Kakkonen
- 11 seasons in Kolmonen

== Club structure ==
Euran Pallo run a large number of teams including 2 men's team, 1 ladies team, 2 men's veterans team, 5 boys teams and 4 girls teams. A popular event run by the club each summer is the Nordea Liiga, a league competition for young boys and girls.

== References and sources ==
- Official Website
- Finnish Wikipedia
- Suomen Cup
- Euran Pallo M1 Facebook
