= Joensuun Palloseura =

Finnish football club

- Full name: Joensuun Palloseura
- Nickname(s): JoPS
- Founded: 1929; 96 years ago
- Ground: Koillispuisto, Joensuu, Finland
- Manager: Jarmo Alastalo
- League: Vitonen
Home colours	Away colours

Joensuun Palloseura (abbreviated JoPS) is a football club from Joensuu, Finland. JoPS is Joensuu's oldest football club, formed in 1929. The club has competed in the second tier of Finnish football over six seasons, the last time being in 1968. JoPS currently plays in the Vioten section, which covers Eastern Finland.

== History ==
JoPS has covered sports such as bandy, pesäpallo, football, and tennis. The football club officially began operations in 1930, the same year as the Karelian District Football Association was established. In the 1940s, JoPS was the leading bandy club of North Karelia. The team rose to the Premier Division in 1940 and remained in the highest division until 1949 without winning any medals. In the early 1950s, JoPS lost its status as the top bandy club in Joensuu and began to invest more in football.

JoPS dominated the North Karelian football until the 1970s. The club competed in the second tier of Finnish football in 1938, 1952, 1958–59, 1964 and 1968. It also won the district championships in a number of years in succession in Joensuu in the period 1949–1956. In the early 1970s, JoPS participated in the re-structured league system which introduced the new Third Division. The team were promoted at the end of the 1972 season to the Second Division Division, but 1973 was the only year that they played at this level the team gaining only 4 points. JoPS amalgamated with Karpalo in October 1973, but became operational again in 1976 and played in the 1980s in the Third Division.

After ten years of silence, the club name JoPS appeared again in the new millennium when the club resumed its football activities. JoPS has run a team in the Kolmonen since 2002.

== Notable former players ==
- Raimo Kauppinen – former Finnish footballer who began career at Joensuu in 1958–1959 before moving on to HJK (1960–1968 and 1971) and Kiffen 1969–1970. He played in one A-team international game.
- Seppo Pelkonen – former Finnish footballer who played 16 A-team international matches and 4 B-team international matches. He played for KuPS who won the Finnish championship in 1956.

== Season to season ==
Season	Level	Division	Section	Administration	Position	Movements
2002	Tier 4	Kolmonen (Third Division)		Eastern Finland (SPL Itä-Suomi)	4th	
2003	Tier 4	Kolmonen (Third Division)		Eastern Finland (SPL Itä-Suomi)	5th	
2004	Tier 4	Kolmonen (Third Division)		Eastern Finland (SPL Itä-Suomi)	9th	
2005	Tier 4	Kolmonen (Third Division)		Eastern Finland (SPL Itä-Suomi)	3rd	
2006	Tier 4	Kolmonen (Third Division)		Eastern Finland (SPL Itä-Suomi)	7th	
2007	Tier 4	Kolmonen (Third Division)		Eastern Finland (SPL Itä-Suomi)	8th	
2008	Tier 4	Kolmonen (Third Division)		Eastern Finland (SPL Itä-Suomi)	5th	
2009	Tier 4	Kolmonen (Third Division)		Eastern and Central Finland (SPL Itä-Suomi)	4th	
2010	Tier 4	Kolmonen (Third Division)		Eastern and Central Finland (SPL Itä-Suomi)	7th	

- 9 seasons in Kolmonen

== 2010 season ==
JoPS First Team are competing in the Kolmonen administered by the Itä-Suomi SPL and Keski-Suomi SPL. This is the fourth highest tier in the Finnish football system.

JoPS/2 are participating in Section A (Lohko A) of the Nelonen administered by the Itä-Suomi SPL.

== Players in 2011 ==
Goalkeepers:

- (Finland) 1 Jussi Nevalainen
- (Finland) 69 Markku Ukskoski

Defenders:

- (Finland) 4 Matti Määttänen
- (Finland) 8 Mika Karjalainen
- (Finland) Tuomas Kortelainen
- (Finland) Erno Pennanen
- (Finland) Sami Voutilainen
- (Finland) Jussi Reijonen
- (Finland) Eemeli Reinikainen

Midfield Players:

- (Finland) 6 Tomi Ronkainen
- (Finland) 7 Jussi Aarnio
- (Finland) 9 Pekka Mähönen
- (Finland) Jami Päivinen
- (Finland) Marko Kylmälä
- (Finland) Janne Savolainen
- (Finland) Ville Koskela

Forwards:

- (Finland) 18 Erkka Vesanen
- (Finland) 19 Miika Nevalainen
- (Finland) Harri Tolvanen

== References and sources ==
- Official Website
- Finnish Wikipedia
- Joensuun Palloseura-JOPS Facebook
