= Nummelan Palloseura =

Finnish sports club

- Full name: Nummelan Palloseura
- Nickname(s): NuPS
- Founded: 1964
- Ground: Kuoppanummen nurmi, Nummela, Vihti, Finland
- Chairman: Ville Kiuru
- Manager: Kimmo Kettunen
- Coach: Jukka Kesälä
- League: Kolmonen
Home colours	Away colours

Nummela Palloseura (abbreviated NuPS) is a sports club from Nummela in Vihti, Finland. The club was formed in 1964 and since the outset football has been the dominant sport. NuPS runs around 30 teams with men's, women's and junior sections. In addition the club runs leagues and tournaments, outside activities for infants, developmental activities for disabled children and general fitness football for players of all ages.

In 2008 the club had around 625 registered players and in 2009 this increased to 700 players (750 players when peripheral football activities are included). In total NuPS's teams play around 700 games every year.

== History ==
The inaugural meeting of the club took place on 14 October 1964 when it was decided to establish an Ice hockey rink at the Nummelan sports ground. NuPS joined the Finnish Ice Hockey Association and in the spring of 1965 joined the Finnish Football League. Other ball games within NuPS's remit at that time included field hockey, volleyball, basketball, tennis, squash and table tennis. However the sport of football dominated, the expansion of the football club being linked to the population growth of Vihti municipality.

== Season to season ==
Season	Level	Division	Section	Administration	Position	Movements
2000	Tier 5	Nelonen (Fourth Division)	Section 1	Uusimaa District (SPL Uusimaa)	1st	Promoted
2001	Tier 4	Kolmonen (Third Division)	Section 1	Helsinki & Uusimaa (SPL Uusimaa)	3rd	
2002	Tier 4	Kolmonen (Third Division)	Section 1	Helsinki & Uusimaa (SPL Uusimaa)	6th	
2003	Tier 4	Kolmonen (Third Division)	Section 1	Helsinki & Uusimaa (SPL Uusimaa)	5th	
2004	Tier 4	Kolmonen (Third Division)	Section 1	Helsinki & Uusimaa (SPL Uusimaa)	12th	Relegated
2005	Tier 5	Nelonen (Fourth Division)	Section 1	Uusimaa District (SPL Uusimaa)	2nd	Promoted
2006	Tier 4	Kolmonen (Third Division)	Section 1	Helsinki & Uusimaa (SPL Uusimaa)	5th	
2007	Tier 4	Kolmonen (Third Division)	Section 1	Helsinki & Uusimaa (SPL Uusimaa)	9th	
2008	Tier 4	Kolmonen (Third Division)	Section 1	Helsinki & Uusimaa (SPL Uusimaa)	5th	
2009	Tier 4	Kolmonen (Third Division)	Section 1	Helsinki & Uusimaa (SPL Uusimaa)	5th	
2010	Tier 4	Kolmonen (Third Division)	Section 1	Helsinki & Uusimaa (SPL Uusimaa)	8th	
2011	Tier 4	Kolmonen (Third Division)	Section 1	Helsinki & Uusimaa (SPL Uusimaa)	3rd	Withdrew from league
2012	Tier 5	Nelonen (Fourth Division)	Section 1	Uusimaa District (SPL Uusimaa)	3rd	
2013	Tier 5	Nelonen (Fourth Division)	Section 1	Uusimaa District (SPL Uusimaa)	1st	Promoted
2014	Tier 4	Kolmonen (Third Division)	Section 1	Helsinki & Uusimaa (SPL Uusimaa)	4th	
2015	Tier 4	Kolmonen (Third Division)	Section 1	Helsinki & Uusimaa (SPL Uusimaa)	2nd	
2016	Tier 4	Kolmonen (Third Division)	Section 1	Helsinki & Uusimaa (SPL Uusimaa)	1st	Promoted
2017	Tier 3	Kakkonen (Second Division)	Group B	Finnish FA (Suomen Pallolitto)	11th	Relegated
2018	Tier 4	Kolmonen (Third Division)	Section 1	Helsinki & Uusimaa (SPL Uusimaa)	6th	
2019	Tier 4	Kolmonen (Third Division)	Section 1	Helsinki & Uusimaa (SPL Uusimaa)	4th	
2020	Tier 4	Kolmonen (Third Division)	Section 1	Helsinki & Uusimaa (SPL Uusimaa)	12th	
2021	Tier 4	Kolmonen (Third Division)	Section 1	Helsinki & Uusimaa (SPL Uusimaa)	12th	Relegated
2022	Tier 5	Nelonen (Fourth Division)	Section 1	Uusimaa District (SPL Uusimaa)	1st	Promoted
2023	Tier 4	Kolmonen (Third Division)	Section 1	Helsinki & Uusimaa (SPL Uusimaa)	2nd	
2024	Tier 4	Kolmonen (Third Division)	Section 1	Helsinki & Uusimaa (SPL Uusimaa)	5th	

- 1 season in Kakkonen
- 18 seasons in Kolmonen
- 5 seasons in Nelonen

== Infrastructure ==
Nummela has good conditions for football with:

- 3 x grass pitches (full size)
- 1 x artificial pitch (full size)
- 1 x gravel pitch (full size)
- 5 x gravel pitches (for small-sided games)
- 1 x hall in winter (full size with artificial turf)

== Club structure ==
For the current season NuPS are running 2 men's teams, 1 veterans men's team, 2 ladies teams, 1 veterans ladies team, 12 boys teams and 5 girls teams.

== 2010 season ==
NuPS First Team are competing in Section 1 (Lohko 1) of the Kolmonen administered by the Helsinki SPL and Uusimaa SPL. This is the fourth highest tier in the Finnish football system.

NuPS Reserves are participating in Section 1 (Lohko 1) of the Nelonen administered by the Uusimaa SPL.

== Men's First Team players ==
Name	Number	Nationality	Captain
Players
Cristian Thornberg	1	(Finland)
Sam Vikström	2	(Finland)
Riku Kaalamo	3	(Finland)	A
Jukka Tolvanen	4	(Finland)	A
Sami Hakala-Bergman	5	(Finland)	C
Toni Lehtonen	7	(Finland)
Kaarle Glad	8	(Finland)	A
Joonas Ankkuri	9	(Finland)
Mikko Lätti	11	(Finland)
Matti Keskinen	12	(Finland)
Tino Casagrande	13	(Finland)
Janne Tuominen	14	(Finland)
Lasse Kasurinen	15	(Finland)
Tomi Hietanen	16	(Finland)
Jari Havantola	17	(Finland)
Lasse Morander	18	(Finland)
Joonas Timonen	19	(Finland)
Jyri Niskanen	20	(Finland)
Tomi Leivo	21	(Finland)
Teemu Tolppala	22	(Finland)
Mika Kuusjoki	23	(Finland)
Miika Talvasto	24	(Finland)
Anton Pokki	26	(Finland)
Mikko Okkonen	27	(Finland)
Topi Sahlström	30	(Finland)

== Sources and references ==
- Official Website
- Suomen Cup
- NuPS Facebook
