= 2004 Finnish Cup =

2004 Suomen Cup
Tournament details
- Country: Finland
- Teams: 386

The 2004 Finnish Cup (Finnish: Suomen Cup) was the 50th season of the main annual association football cup competition in Finland. It was organised as a single-elimination knock–out tournament and participation in the competition was voluntary. A total of 386 teams registered for the competition. The final was held at the Finnair Stadium, Helsinki on 30 October 2004 with MyPa defeating FC Hämeenlinna by 2-1 before an attendance of 2,650 spectators.

== Teams ==
Round	Clubs remaining	Clubs involved	Winners from previous round	New entries this round	Leagues entering at this round
Round 1	386	148	none	148	Kolmonen (Tier 4); Nelonen (Tier 5); Vitonen (Tier 6); Kutonen (Tier 7); Seiska (Tier 8); Others (including Veterans and Youth)
Round 2	312	248	74	174	see above
Round 3	188	124	124	none	none
Round 4	126	124	64	64	Kakkonen (Tier 3); Ykkönen (Tier 2); Veikkausliiga (Tier 1)
Round 5	64	60	60	none	none - 2 byes
Round 6	32	16	30	2 byes	none
Round 7	16	16	16	none	none
Quarter-finals	8	8	8	none	none
Semi-finals	4	4	4	none	none
Final	2	2	2	none	none

== Round 1 ==
Tie no	Home team	Score	Away team	Information
1	Gnistan 2	5-1	Valtti	
2	FC POHU 2	0-7	FC POHU 1	
3	Geishan Pallo 2	0-2	FC KV	
4	Ragulins	0-7	FC Kiffen JKKI-35	
5	HeKuLa	2-5 (aet)	Ponnistus	
6	Ruisku	2-3	PPJ	
7	PPV 2	6-2	Orson	
8	HC H:Rtto	2-1 (aet)	HDS JKKI-35	
9	MaKu	8-0	HePuLi	
10	SAPA	2-1	PK-35 A1	
11	Sheikit	1-6	SUMU	
12	Spartak	5-0	Dynamo	
13	FC Pakila	2-0	FC POHU 3	
14	HDS 1	1-5	MPS	
15	FC Boca	1-14	HJK A	
16	Lepo	0-1	OT-77 1	
17	Pathoven	3-0	Pöxyt A	
18	KoiPS	0-3	Pöxyt	
19	FC Honka 2	0-6	FC Futura	
20	EHAwks	0-9	EsPa A	
21	Kasiysi	0-9	JäPS	
22	RePa-93	0-6	Kelohonka	
23	FC HaNa 2	1-10	City Stars	
24	Legenda United	0-3	PMP	Legenda United withdrew
25	FC Lohja JKKI-35	2-3 (aet)	MasKi	
26	JoKi	2-15	AC Vantaa	
27	TGrani	2-3	VJS A	
28	OPedot JKKI-35	1-10	HP-47	
29	Noula	3-1	R Ilves	
30	FC Bosna	0-9	FC Inter A	
31	SCR	3-0	FC Turku-82	
32	FC NU	3-2	UPK 1	
33	TuWe	0-3	LTU	
34	Ponteva	3-2	JyTy	
35	FC Eurajoki	1-4	FC Rauma 2	
36	P-Iirot A	8-2	TOVE	
37	FC Jazz A	5-0	VAlku A	
38	KaVo 2	0-7	YlöR	

Tie no	Home team	Score	Away team	Information
39	JK Mylly	1-2	AC Er-Pa	
40	TPV A	1-3	PaTo	
41	LiLu	0-8	S-Ilves	
42	LaVe	3-1	FC VAPSI	
43	Härmä	4-3 (aet)	Dynamo Utd	
44	Daltonit	0-11	ErHu	
45	FC Haka A	4-3 (aet)	VaKP	
46	Norsulauma	5-0	Jags	
47	KooVee	6-0	TamFu JKKI-35	
48	VIFK JKKI-35	1-12	Sporting	
49	KJV	2-10	NFF	
50	SO-TI	0-3	IK	SO-TI withdrew
51	HyMy	0-10	FC Kiisto 2	
52	FC YPA 2	3-1	MunU	
53	LoVe	1-4	ÖJA-73	
54	Konkarit JKKI-60	0-3	Esse IK	Konkarit JKKI-60 withdrew
55	OuJK 1	0-4	FC-88	
56	OuJK 2	3-0	OuTa	
57	FC Tarmo	6-1	FC Kanuunat	
58	Tervarit JKKI-35	0-3	Rovaniemi Utd	Tervarit JKKI-35 withdrew
59	FC FC Oulu	0-7	FC Nets	
60	FCS	0-1	JIlves	
61	PaRi	2-0	KeuPa	
62	Huima 2	0-3	JJK A	
63	AFC Keltik	2-8	JuPS	
64	Real Siilinjärvi	1-6	SuPa	
65	ToPS-90	4-2	JoPS	
66	PK-37 2	1-7	S.C.Zulimanit	
67	Peltirumpu	0-10	HaPK	
68	Kup	0-6	Ri-Pa	
69	Kopa	7-3	JK Bulls	
70	PeKa	0-2	VKajo	
71	ViSa	2-0	LIK	
72	FC Pantterit 2	4-0	RPS	
73	MP JKKI-35	3-0	Sudet	
74	FC MyPa JKKI-35	6-0	HaPK JKKI-35	

== Round 2 ==
Tie no	Home team	Score	Away team	Information
75	Trikiinit	6-0	Real Inferno	
76	Veijarit-86	0-13	RoU	
77	FC Kiffen 2	1-6	HJK A	
78	Vesa	3-4 (aet)	FC Kiffen JKKI-35	
79	JJ VEPO	3-3; 4-3 (p.)	FC POHU A	
80	PPV 2	5-1	Juhlahevoset	
81	Gnistan 2	4-0	SUMU Lyon	
82	HEK	0-3	Ellas	
83	LPS 2	1-9	PPV 1	
84	SAPA	0-3	FC Ogeli	
85	Ponnistus	8-1	PuiU 3	
86	TOTE Avauspotku	1-3	HPS	
87	MPS	9-1	PK-35 A2	
88	S.S.Stanley	2-4	MaKu	
89	Spartak	3-1	PH-99	
90	HDS 2	13-0	FC RiskI	
91	PETO	0-3	PuiU	
92	HC H:Rtto	1-8	PPJ	
93	FC Pakila	1-3	HDS 3	
94	FC POHU 1	2-1	SUMU	
95	Zenith	2-1	FC KV	
96	JäPS	3-3; 6-4 (p.)	GrIFK	
97	VeVe	0-7	KP-75	
98	Pathoven	5-2	SibboV	
99	OJy	0-5	FC HIK	
100	HooGee 2	4-2	PUM	
101	FC Västnyland JKKI	0-2	R Ilves	
102	FC Honka A	12-0	RiRa A	
103	Nateva	2-0	OT-77 2	
104	Kelohonka	2-2; 3-4 (p.)	AC Vantaa	
105	EsPa	2-5	FC Kuusysi A	
106	OT-77 1	0-7	PK-50	
107	HooGee 3	1-8	FC Reipas A	
108	AC JAZZPA	0-3	FCK Salamat 2	
109	PK-50 JKKI	2-9	EsPa A	
110	HP-47	0-3	VJS A	
111	LePa	4-1	FC Futura	
112	FC Lohja	0-11	City Stars	
113	MasKi	6-2	Rankki JKKI	
114	F.C.B.	0-8	Pöxyt	
115	NuPS	5-1	LoPa	
116	RiRa	1-2 (aet)	PMP	
117	VALO JKKI	5-4	OPedot	
118	FC Inter A	2-0	TuTo	
119	Vilpas	2-0	FC Boda	
120	RP-67	0-2	LTU	
121	SCR	6-0	TPS A	
122	PiPS	4-3	TPK	
123	YlKiri	1-4	AFC Campus	
124	MynPa	5-2	TC	
125	FC NU	1-6	Ponteva	
126	UPK 2	2-1	PoPa	
127	FC Jazz A	2-0	Nasta	
128	ReKu	1-3	KaPa	
129	P-Iirot A	13-1	MInto	
130	FC Rauma 2	0-2	RuoVi	
131	FC Blackjack	2-15	RauKV	
132	FC HML 2	8-1	LaVe	
133	KaVo	8-0	PP-70 2	
134	ErHu	2-5	Loiske	
135	PiPo-79	0-4	PaTo	
136	Viri	2-1 (aet)	KOPA-90	
137	VaKP JKKI	0-6	FC Ilves A	

Tie no	Home team	Score	Away team	Information
138	AC Er-Pa	0-8	NoPy	
139	Mäntän Valo	0-16	S-Ilves	
140	YlöR	3-10	ToiP-49	
141	Norsulauma	7-1	FC IrIna	
142	UrPS	1-4	KooVee	
143	Härmä	0-6	PS-44	
144	FC Kivitasku	7-2	Ta-Po	
145	FC Haka A	5-0	TKT 2	
146	FC SorPa	2-3	ViiPV	
147	Sporting	1-4	NFF 2	
148	MIF	0-2	APV	
149	NFF	5-3	Karhu	
150	VPV	3-2 (aet)	VäVi	
151	IK	3-1	TP-Seinäjoki A	
152	Jurva-70	2-3	FC Järviseutu	
153	KuRy	4-1	Sisu	
154	TePa	2-1 (aet)	SIK	
155	FC Kiisto 2	2-3 (aet)	FC Kuffen	
156	Ura 2	0-7	KPV A	
157	FF Jaro 2	4-2	OuHu	
158	Esse IK	3-0	Konkarit JKKI-50	Konkarit JKKI-50 withdrew
159	Konkrait JKK-55	0-3	PsInto	Konkarit JKKI-55 withdrew
160	FC YPA 2	2-3	ÖJA-73	
161	PaPa	1-7	FC Raahe	
162	FC Tarmo	3-2	Tervarit jr A	
163	SC PAPS	1-2	FC Nets	
164	Rovaniemi Utd	3-2 (aet)	FC Dreeverit	
165	JS Hercules	0-1	RoPS A	
166	KulPa	0-8	OuJK 2	
167	FC-88	4-0	Pe-Po	
168	PaTe	1-3	FC Kurenpojat	
169	ToTa	1-5	OLS A	
170	PaRi	2-0	KaPa-51	
171	JIlves	2-4	Souls AC	
172	FCV 2	2-3	FC KaDy	
173	JJK A	3-0	BET	
174	VJK	2-1	FCV	
175	Lihamylly	0-6	KuPS 2	
176	KallSi	0-9	SaPa	
177	KarTe	0-16	SiPS 1	
178	RautU	1-3	Riverball	
179	Riverball JKKI	2-3	JuPy	
180	SiPS 2	1-0	JIPPO A	
181	MPR	2-4 (aet)	PAVE	
182	JuPS	4-2	ToPS-90	
183	S.C.Zulimanit	3-0	S.C.KuFu-98	
184	SuPa	0-9	Raiku	
185	FC MyPa JKKI-35	0-3	KTP 1	
186	VKajo	1-5	KYritys	
187	MoNSa	1-3 (aet)	FC PaSa	
188	Purha	5-0	HiHa	
189	FC Loviisa	0-1	Kopa	
190	HaPK	1-2	FC KooTeePee A	
191	ViSa	0-6	PEPO	
192	MP JKKI-35	2-0	VoPpK	
193	KPonsi	0-1	FC Villisiat	
194	FC POPA	0-5	STPS	
195	Ri-Pa	1-3	PoPo	
196	FC Pantterit 2	7-0	PePo	
197	KTP 2	0-4	WIFK JKKI	
198	Jäntevä	0-8	MyPa A	

== Round 3 ==
Tie no	Home team	Score	Away team	Information
199	Ellas	1-3	MPS	
200	PPJ	2-3	JJ VEPO	
201	Trikiinit	3-7	FC Kiffen JKKI-35	
202	HPS	2-5	FC POHU 1	
203	PPV 1	2-3 (aet)	PPV 2	
204	PuiU	0-2	Zenith	
205	HJK A	10-0	HDS 3	
206	RoU	0-4	Gnistan 2	
207	Ponnistus	3-2	Spartak	
208	HDS 2	0-3	FC Ogeli	
209	MaKu	7-0	MasKi	
210	JäPS	1-2	City Stars	
211	FC Kuusysi A	3-0	FC HIK	FC HIK withdrew
212	EsPa A	2-3	Pöxyt	
213	VALO JKKI	2-2; 6-7 (p.)	PK-50	
214	Nateva	2-4 (aet)	R Ilves	
215	FCK Salamat 2	2-4 (aet)	KP-75	
216	VJS A	1-3	HooGee 2	
217	AC Vantaa	3-2 (aet)	NuPS	
218	Pathoven	0-2	LePa	
219	FC Honka A	0-4	PMP	
220	FC HML 2	1-4	FC Reipas A	
221	NoPy	1-3	Norsulauma	
222	KaVo	3-2	Loiske	
223	PS-44	3-0	PaTo	
224	FC Ilves A	0-2	S-Ilves	
225	ViiPV	2-3	FC Kivitasku	
226	ToiP-49	3-1	FC Haka A	
227	KooVee	4-3	Viri	
228	AFC Campus	1-7	FC Jazz A	
229	FC Inter A	0-1	LTU	

Tie no	Home team	Score	Away team	Information
230	MynPa	1-3	Vilpas	
231	RauKV	2-1	KaPa	
232	Ponteva	2-0	UPK 2	
233	SCR	1-0 (aet)	P-Iirot A	
234	RuoVi	4-0	PiPS	
235	Sporting	2-0	APV	
236	FC Järviseutu	0-1 (aet)	FC Kuffen	
237	TePa	0-3	VPV	
238	NFF	2-9	KuRy	
239	VJK	1-1; 3-5 (p.)	IK	
240	FC KaDy	1-3	PaRi	
241	JIlves	0-2	JJK A	
242	Esse IK	4-1	PsInto	
243	ÖJA-73	2-1	FF Jaro 2	
244	FC Nets	0-5	KPV A	
245	RoPS A	1-2	OuJK 2	
246	Rovaniemi Utd	3-1	FC-88	
247	OLS A	4-3 (aet)	FC Tarmo	
248	FC Raahe	0-2	FC Kurenpojat	
249	JuPy	1-1; 1-2 (p.)	PAVE	
250	SuPa	1-4	KuPS 2	
251	ToPS-90	1-4	Riverball	
252	S.C.Zulimanit	0-6	SiPS 2	
253	SaPa	7-1	SiPS 1	
254	FC PaSa	0-2	MP JKKI-35	
255	MyPa A	0-8	FC Pantterit 2	
256	Kopa	0-4	KTP 1	
257	Purha	1-0 (aet)	STPS	
258	FC KooTeePee A	0-9	FC Villisiat	
259	PoPo	2-6	PEPO	
260	VKajo	0-3	WIFK JKKI	

== Round 4 ==
Tie no	Home team	Score	Away team	Information
261	FC Ogeli	0-1 (aet)	City Stars	
262	R Ilves	0-5	HJK	
263	PuiU	1-0	HyPS	
264	LePa	0-3	AC Vantaa	
265	FC Kuusysi A	0-1	Atlantis FC	
266	PPV 1	1-7	FC Viikingit	
267	PK-50	4-6	MPS	
268	RoU	0-13	Klubi 04	
269	Ponnistus	4-4; 7-4 (p.)	HJK A	
270	KP-75	0-2	FC Kiffen	
271	FC Reipas A	5-2	Gnistan	
272	FC Kiffen JKKI-35	1-4	MaKu	
273	FC POHU 1	0-0; 5-4 (p.)	JJ VEPO	
274	VJS A	0-4	KäPa	
275	Pöxyt	1-4	FCK Salamat	
276	PMP	1-3	TiPS	
277	PK-35	2-0	FC Espoo	
278	FC Kontu	1-2	FC Honka	
279	S-Ilves	2-0	Ponteva	
280	PiPS	2-4	KaaPo	
281	ToiP-49	2-0	FC Jazz A	
282	NoPy	0-1	P-Iirot	
283	TKT	3-0	SalPa	
284	FC Rauma	1-3	FC Haka	
285	TPV	1-2	FC Inter	
286	SCR	0-3	FC Jazz	
287	Vilpas	0-5	FC Hämeenlinna	
288	FJK	1-1; 3-5 (p.)	PP-70	
289	KaVo	0-5	Tampere United	
290	ViiPV	0-1 (aet)	EuPa	
291	PS-44	4-0	LTU	

Tie no	Home team	Score	Away team	Information
292	RauKV	0-5	MuSa	
293	KooVee	0-9	TPS	
294	PaRi	1-0 (aet)	JBK	
295	IK	0-4	VPS	
296	ÖJA-73	0-4	Huima	
297	VPV	0-1	FF Jaro	
298	TUS	1-3	TP-Seinäjoki	
299	JJK	2-0	GBK	
300	Sporting	1-5	VIFK	
301	NFF	1-4	PsInto	
302	JJK A	0-5	FC Korsholm	
303	KPV A	3-5	FC YPA	
304	KPV	0-0; 1-3 (p.)	Virkiä	
305	FC Kuffen	0-3	JKL United	
306	PS Kemi	1-4	RoPS	
307	Rovaniemi Utd	1-4	FC Rio Grande	
308	OLS	0-4	TP-47	
309	FC Kurenpojat	0-3	RoPS A	
310	OLS A	0-1	KajHa	
311	MiKi	0-6	MyPa	
312	KuPS 2	0-3	Kings	
313	S.C.Zulimanit	4-1	MyPa A	
314	Pantterit	0-1	KuPS	
315	FC KooTeePee A	1-7	FC KooTeePee	
316	SaPa	2-0	PK-37	
317	PAVE	1-5	FC Kuusankoski	
318	KTP 1	7-1	Purha	
319	VKajo	0-10	ToPS-90	
320	FC PaSa	0-2	JIPPO	
321	PEPO	0-3	MP	
322	Warkaus JK	5-0	LehPa-77	

== Round 5 ==
Tie no	Home team	Score	Away team	Information
323	Kiffen	1-2	FC KooTeePee	
324	KTP	3-0	TiPS	
325	PS-44	0-2	MuSa	
326	FC Reipas A	1-2 (aet)	KaaPo	
327	KäPa	2-0	P-Iirot	
328	Atlantis FC	1-2	HJK	
329	MaKu	2-1 (aet)	TKT	
330	PK-35	0-2	Klubi 04	
331	PaRi	0-11	MyPa	
332	EuPa	0-3	FC Viikingit	
333	VKajo	0-4	FC Lahti	
334	MP	3-2	FC Inter	
335	PP-70	1-0	FC Jazz	
336	TPS	1-0 (aet)	Tampere United	
337	PuiU	3-2	ToiP-49	
338	Ponnistus	0-4	FC Kuusankoski	

Tie no	Home team	Score	Away team	Information
339	FCK Salamat	0-4	FC Hämeenlinna	
340	Ponteva	1-4	AC Allianssi	
341	City Stars	2-1	FC Honka	
342	JJ VEPO	1-4	FC Haka	
343	AC Vantaa	3-2	MPS	
344	JJK	3-0	FC Rio Grande	Rio Grande withdrew
345	S.C.Zulimanit	2-1	NFF	
346	FC Korsholm	0-2	VPS	
347	FC YPA	1-3	JIPPO	
348	TP-Seinäjoki	2-1	Kings	
349	Warkaus JK	1-2	TP-47	
350	Huima	3-0	KuPS	
351	VIFK	5-0	KajHa	
352	JKL United	2-3	RoPS	
353	RoPS A	1-4	FF Jaro	

== Round 6 ==
Tie no	Home team	Score	Away team	Information
355	Virkiä	0-3	PP-70	
356	FC Viikingit	0-4	FC Haka	
357	AC Vantaa	0-4	FC Hämeenlinna	
358	City Stars	1-2	VPS	
359	MuSa	0-4	FC Lahti	
360	Klubi 04	5-1	KaaPo	
361	Huima	1-0	TPS	
362	S.C.Zulimanit	3-6	KäPa	

Tie no	Home team	Score	Away team	Information
363	KTP 1	2-4	FC Kuusankoski	
364	PuiU	1-3	MyPa	
365	JIPPO	0-7	MP	
366	VIFK	2-7	AC Allianssi	
367	MaKu	1-3	TP-Seinäjoki	
368	JJK	1-5	HJK	
369	FC KooTeePee	1-0	FF Jaro	
370	TP-47	0-3	RoPS	

== Round 7 ==
Tie no	Home team	Score	Away team	Information
371	Klubi 04	1-0	FC Kuusankoski	
372	RoPS	2-0	FC KooTeePee	
373	TP-Seinäjoki	0-7	AC Allianssi	
374	FC Lahti	3-3; 7-6 (p.)	MP	

Tie no	Home team	Score	Away team	Information
375	VPS	2-3 (aet)	PP-70	
376	MyPa	3-2	HJK	
377	KäPa	0-2	FC Haka	
378	Huima	0-3	FC Hämeenlinna	

== Quarter-finals ==
Tie no	Home team	Score	Away team	Information
379	FC Haka	2-1	FC Lahti	
380	FC Hämeenlinna	1-1; 6-5 (p.)	RoPS	

Tie no	Home team	Score	Away team	Information
381	PP-70	1-3	Klubi 04	
382	AC Allianssi	1-2	MyPa	

== Semi-finals ==
Tie no	Home team	Score	Away team	Information
383	FC Haka	3-6	MyPa	

Tie no	Home team	Score	Away team	Information
384	Klubi 04	1-2	FC Hämeenlinna	

== Final ==
Tie no	Team 1	Score	Team 2	Information
385	MyPa	2-1	FC Hämeenlinna	Att. 2,650
