= 2010 Finnish Cup =

2010 Suomen Cup
Tournament details
- Country: Finland
- Teams: 271

Final positions
- Champions: TPS Turku
- Runners-up: HJK Helsinki

2010 Finnish Cup (Finnish: Suomen Cup) was the 56th season of the main annual football (soccer) cup competition in Finland. It was organized as a single-elimination knock–out tournament.

Participation in the competition was voluntary. The winners of the competition entered the second qualifying round of UEFA Europa League.

A total of 271 teams registered for the competition. They entered in different rounds, depending on their position within the league system. Clubs with teams in Kolmonen (level IV) or an inferior league, as well as Veterans and Junior teams, started the competition in Round 1. Teams from Ykkönen (level II) and Kakkonen (level III) entered in Round 3. Veikkausliiga clubs started in Round 4 with the exceptions of Inter Turku, FC Honka, TPS and HJK Helsinki. These four teams entered in Round 5 because they had qualified for European competitions after the 2009 season.

The tournament started on 30 January 2010 with the First Round and concluded with the Final held on 25 September 2010 at Sonera Stadium, Helsinki.

== Round 1 ==
The draw for this round was conducted on 14 January 2010. 220 teams were drawn into 110 matches for this round. Unlike last year, there was no need to award byes. The matches were played between 30 January and 28 February 2010.

Tie no	Home team	Score	Away team
1	AFC EMU	0–5	SAPA
2	Töölön Taisto	0–5	MPS
3	Kurvin Vauhti	5–1	FC Pakila
4	HDS	0–0 (aet)	FC Kontu
FC Kontu advance 5–4 on penalties
5	FC BrBr	1–5	Töölön Vesa
6	HePu	6–1	FC POHU/4
7	Gnistan/4	0–1	HJK Juniors/Kannelmäki
8	AC StaSi	0–2	PuiU
9	FC Degis	1–2	HerTo
10	Gnistan/3	4–2	AC StaSi/Europort
11	HPS	4–0	FC POHU
12	PPJ	1–3	MPS Atletico Malmi
13	HJK Juniors	0–3	PPV
14	SUMU	1–5	Ponnistus
15	PPJ Haastajat	2–2 (aet)	LPS/Kuninkaat
LPS/Kuninkaat advance 5–4 on penalties
16	FC POHU/3	3–1	KPR
17	MPS/Old Stars	1–2	Gnistan Reserves
18	SAPA Reserves	4–2	FC POHU Reserves
19	FC HeIV	0–2	PPV Reserves
20	Juhlahevoset	1–2	HeKuLa
21	HooGee/4	2–8	Pöxyt
22	BK-46 Reserves	1–2	SibboV
23	Naseva	0–3	FC Espoo Reserves
24	RiRa Reserves	1–2	KyIF/FCK
25	KP-75/SaPo	0–7	NuPS
26	FC Västnyland	0–9	JäPS
27	RiRa	4–1	LePa
28	FC Kasiysi/Rocky	2–2 (aet)	VJS
VJS advance 4–3 on penalties
29	Nopsa	0–8	EsPa
30	HyPS	1–2	KOPSE
31	F.C. Pathoven	3–2	OPedot
32	FC Tuusula	0–0 (aet)	MasKi
FC Tuusula advance 8–7 on penalties
33	F.C.B.	0–16	SalReipas
34	NuPS Reserves	0–0 (aet)	Keravan Dynamo
Keravan Dynamo advance 5–3 on penalties
35	EIF Akademi	5–1	Biisonit
36	HooGee	1–9	NJS
37	Lahen Pojat	2–2 (aet)	RIlves
RIlves advance 2–1 on penalties
38	JäPS Reserves	0–5	TiPS
39	PoPo	7–2	RiPa
40	Liljendal IK	1–5	FC Peltirumpu
41	FC Villisiat	2–0	KarPo
42	HaPK	1–2	Sudet
43	LauTP/LaPe	2–0	FC Kausala
44	Jäntevä	2–3	KTP
45	FC PASA	1–1 (aet)	PeKa
FC PASA advance 6–5 on penalties
46	STPS Reserves	1–4	Kultsu FC
47	Sudet Reserves	1–2	KoRe
48	PaPe	2–0	FC Loviisa
49	Jäntevä Reserves	1–0	HP-47
50	SiPS Reserves	0–1	SiPS
51	Yllätys	1–2	KJK
52	RautU	2–2 (aet)	ToU
ToU advance 7–6 on penalties
53	JoPS	0–1	SC Zulimanit
54	LaPa-95	3–2	AFC Keltik
55	OHuima	0–9	SC KuFu-98

Tie no	Home team	Score	Away team
56	MPR	2–0	ToPS-90
57	HPP	4–1	FC Kurd
58	Skädäm	1–5	ViPa
59	BET/Harjun Potku	0–3	JIlves
60	KeuPa	0–5	JPS
61	BET/3	3–1	MultiAnts
62	PaRi	0–3	KaDy
63	JNousu	1–6	BET
64	FCV/Reds	1–4	Karstula K
65	TC	0–5	KaaPS
66	TuWe	0–2	Masku
67	PaiHa	1–5	KaaRe
68	VG-62	3–0	R Ryhti
69	AC Sauvo	0–15	TuTo
70	PiPS	1–6	LiePa
71	TPK/3	0–3	FC RP
72	Ponteva	0–6	JyTy
73	RaiTeePee	0–2	PIF
74	SC Hornets	0–7	FC Boda
75	HNS	0–6	FC Rauma
76	EuPa	2–2 (aet)	Nasta
Nasta advance 4–2 on penalties
77	Koitto	2–3	PiTU
78	Luvia	0–5	TOVE
79	PiPo	0–1	FJK
80	AC Darra	3–1	FC Trombi
81	NePa	3–0	P Visa
82	FC Melody	3–5	AC LeTo
83	TPV Reserves	3–4	TP-T
84	SLoiske	1–1 (aet)	PP-70
PP-70 advance 4–3 on penalties
85	Ylöjärven Pallo	2–7	I-Kissat
86	Apassit	1–8	LeKi
87	VaKP	0–6	TKT
88	Kristallipalatsi	0–5	Pato
89	PP-70 Reserves	0–5	Härmä
90	TPK	2–0	NoPS
91	LaPo-90	2–2 (aet)	TeTe
TeTe advance 8–7 on penalties
92	FC Korsholm Yang B	5–2	KaIK/TePa
93	KorsnäsFF/PeIK	10–1	Jurva-70
94	NuPa	3–0 (w/o)	VäVi
95	FC Korsholm/3	3–3 (aet)	Kungliga Wasa
FC Korsholm/3 advance 3–1 on penalties
96	KJ-V/KANU	0–3 (w/o)	VPS Juniors
97	Black Islanders	2–3	IK
98	FC Kuffen	0–10	Virkiä
99	PeFF	0–3	IFK Jakobstad
100	FC Sääripotku	3–2	FC YPA Reserves
101	Esse IK Reserves	1–1 (aet)	KPV Reserves
KPV Reserves advance 3–1 on penalties
102	IK Myran	3–0	LoVe
103	AC Kajaani	2–0	HauPa
104	JS Hercules	0–0 (aet)	FC Nets
FC Nets advance 4–3 on penalties
105	Inter Välivainio	1–3	FC Rio Grande
106	FC OPA Reserves	0–3 (w/o)	Spartak Kajaani
107	FC88	1–0	FC Muurola
108	Pattijoen Tempaus	0–9	OLS
109	FC Rai	3–1	Ajax Sarkkiranta
110	OuRe	2–2 (aet)	OPS Juniors
OPS Juniors advance 5–4 on penalties

== Round 2 ==
The draw for this round was conducted on 14 January 2010. The 110 winners of the Second Round were drawn into 55 matches for this round. The matches were played between 3 and 28 March 2010.

Tie no	Home team	Score	Away team
111	Töölön Vesa	1–1 (aet)	FC Kontu
FC Kontu advance 4–3 on penalties
112	PPV Reserves	0–0 (aet)	MPS
MPS advance 5–3 on penalties
113	Gnistan/3	2–0	HerTo
114	HJK-j/Kannelmäki	0–0 (aet)	Gnistan Reserves
Gnistan Reserves advance 6–5 on penalties
115	PPV	8–2	PuiU
116	LPS/Kuninkaat	1–3	SAPA
117	HeKuLa	0–5	HPS
118	HePu	0–5	MPS/Atletico Malmi
119	SAPA Reserves	0–2	Ponnistus
120	Kurvin Vauhti	0–0 (aet)	FC POHU/3
Kurvin Vauhti advance 4–3 on penalties
121	FC Espoo Reserves	0–3	TiPS
122	VJS	1–4	EsPa
123	EIF Akademi	0–5	NJS
124	KyIF/FCK	0–4	NuPS
125	RiRa	7–2	RIlves
126	F.C. Pathoven	0–6	SalReipas
127	FC Tuusula	0–6	JäPS
128	KOPSE	0–5	Pöxyt
129	Keravan Dynamo	2–0	SibboV
130	KTP	3–0	KoRe
131	FC PASA	0–0 (aet)	PaPe
PaPe advance 4–2 on penalties
132	Jäntevä Reserves	0–0 (aet)	FC Villisiat
Jäntevä Reserves advance 4–3 on penalties
133	PoPo	5–0	LauTP/LaPe
134	FC Peltirumpu	0–4	Sudet
135	SC Zulimanit	1–2	Kultsu FC
136	LaPa-95	1–5	SC KuFu-98

Tie no	Home team	Score	Away team
137	ToU	1–2	SiPS
138	MPR	3–1	KJK
139	Karstula K	1–4	ViPa
140	JPS	3–1	JIlves
141	KaDy	3–1	BET/3
142	HPP	1–6	BET
143	FC Boda	2–0	JyTy
144	FC RP	0–2	KaaRe
145	VG-62	3–1	KaaPS
146	PIF	1–4	TuTo
147	Masku	0–0 (aet)	LiePa
LiePa advance 2–1 on penalties
148	PiTU	0–0 (aet)	TOVE
PiTU advance 4–2 on penalties
149	FC Rauma	3–0	Nasta
150	Härmä	4–0	AC LeTo
151	LeKi	2–1	FJK
152	TPK	4–0	Pato
153	AC Darra	3–5	PP-70
154	TKT	0–1	I-Kissat
155	NePa	2–1	TP-T
156	Virkiä	1–0	IK
157	TeTe	0–8	VPS Juniors
158	FC Korsholm/3	1–3	NuPa
159	KorsnäsFF/PeIK	2–0	FC Korsholm Yang B
160	FC Sääripotku	2–1	IK Myran
161	KPV Reserves	1–1 (aet)	IFK Jakobstad
KPV Reserves advance 5–4 on penalties
162	OLS	1–2	OPS Juniors
163	FC Nets	6–1	FC88
164	FC Rio Grande	2–11	Spartak Kajaani
165	FC Rai	0–4	AC Kajaani

== Round 3 ==
The draw for this round took place on 19 March 2010. This round includes the 55 winners from the previous round and the 37 clubs from the Ykkönen 2010 and Kakkonen 2010 seasons that entered into the competition. These clubs were drawn into 46 matches that took place between 1 and 15 April 2010.

Tie no	Home team	Score	Away team
166	LPS	4–2	FC Futura
167	GrIFK	3–1	FC Espoo
168	HPS	3–4 (aet)	FC Kuusankoski
169	JäPS	0–3	PEPO
170	PK Keski-Uusimaa	1–5	PK-35
171	Gnistan Reserves	0–6	EIF
172	MPS	3–2	SAPA
173	PoPo	1–11	Ponnistus
174	Gnistan/3	0–2	Sudet
175	MPS/Atletico Malmi	1–4	PPV
176	RiRa	1–3	Gnistan
177	Jäntevä Reserves	2–5	PaPe
178	Kurvin Vauhti	0–6	MP
179	KTP	1–2	City Stars
180	Keravan Dynamo	0–2	SalReipas
181	NuPS	0–1	FC Viikingit
182	Pöxyt	3–2	FC KooTeePee
183	FC Kontu	0–4	HIFK
184	NJS	1–3	AC Vantaa
185	EsPa	3–0	Atlantis FC
186	TiPS	1–5	LoPa
187	SC Riverball	2–1	PK-37
188	BET	3–2	FCV
189	ViPa	4–0	SiPS

Tie no	Home team	Score	Away team
190	MPR	2–11	SC KuFu-98
191	Kultsu FC	0–3	JIPPO
192	KaDy	0–3	JPS
193	VG-62	0–3	FC Hämeenlinna
194	LiePa	0–1	Ilves
195	FC Rauma	0–1	P-Iirot
196	NePa	0–1	FC Jazz Juniors
197	LeKi	2–2 (aet)	TPK
LeKi advance 6–5 on penalties
198	PiTU	1–6	TPV
199	TuTo	3–4	MuSa
200	KaaRe	0–6	I-Kissat
201	FC Boda	6–3 (aet)	PP-70
202	Härmä	0–3	SoVo
203	VPS Juniors	0–3	SJK
204	FC Sääripotku	0–2	FC YPA
205	FC Nets	1–6	PS Kemi Kings
206	Spartak Kajaani	1–0 (aet)	Virkiä
207	FC Santa Claus	1–3 (aet)	RoPS
208	GBK	3–0	FC OPA
209	OPS Juniors	1–0	AC Kajaani
210	NuPa	0–6	KPV
211	KPV Reserves	5–1	KorsnäsFF/PeIK

== Round 4 ==
The draw for this round took place on 8 April 2010. This round includes the 46 winners of the previous round and the 10 2010 Veikkausliiga clubs that entered this competition who are not involved in European competitions for the 2010-11 cycle. This includes all the clubs in the league competition except for Inter Turku, FC Honka, TPS and HJK Helsinki, who will be entering the competition in the round following this one. These 28 matches were played between 20 and 29 April 2010.

Tie no	Home team	Score	Away team
212	MPS	1–4	MYPA
213	LPS	3–1	GrIFK
214	EsPa	4–3	PEPO
215	SalReipas	4–1	LoPa
216	PPV	2–0	FC Kuusankoski
217	PaPe	2–4	Sudet
218	Ponnistus	2–6 (aet)	Gnistan
219	HIFK	3–4 (aet)	PK-35
220	FC Viikingit	2–2 (aet)	MP
MP advance 5–4 on penalties
221	Pöxyt	1–0	AC Vantaa
222	City Stars	2–3	EIF
223	ViPa	3–0	BET
224	SC Riverball	0–3	JIPPO
225	JJK	1–2	KuPS
226	JPS	0–1	SC KuFu-98

Tie no	Home team	Score	Away team
227	Tampere United	1–2	FC Lahti
228	I-Kissat	0–3	FC Jazz Juniors
229	LeKi	1–4	TPV
230	MuSa	0–6	SoVo
231	FC Hämeenlinna	1–2	FC Haka
232	P-Iirot	0–1	IFK Mariehamn
233	FC Boda	0–8	Ilves
234	Spartak Kajaani	0–6	FF Jaro
235	GBK	2–2 (aet)	PS Kemi Kings
GBK advance 5–3 on penalties
236	KPV	2–1	RoPS
237	OPS Juniors	1–1 (aet)	FC YPA
OPS Juniors advance 6–5 on penalties
238	KPV Reserves	0–4	SJK
239	VPS	3–1	AC Oulu

== Round 5 ==
This round included the 28 winners from the previous round and the 4 2010 Veikkausliiga clubs involved in European competition in the 2009-10 cycle: Inter Turku, FC Honka, TPS and HJK Helsinki. These matches were played on 11, 12, 13 and 18 May 2010.

Tie no	Home team	Score	Away team
240	SJK	1–2 (aet)	FF Jaro
241	PPV	1–3	TPS
242	JIPPO	0–1	KuPS
243	FC Lahti	1–2	MYPA
244	FC Jazz Juniors	1–2	VPS
245	SalReipas	2–0	LPS
246	SoVo	0–3	IFK Mariehamn
247	KPV	2–1	PK-35

Tie no	Home team	Score	Away team
248	Ilves	2–1	ViPa
249	Sudet	4–0	OPS Juniors
250	EIF	0–1	FC Haka
251	TPV	0–1	FC Honka
252	GBK	0–3	MP
253	EsPa	0–4	HJK Helsinki
254	Pöxyt	0–6	Inter Turku
255	Gnistan	3–0	SC KuFu-98

== Round 6 ==
This round included the 16 winners of the previous round. These matches were played on 26 and 27 May 2010.

Tie no	Home team	Score	Away team
256	VPS	1–0	MYPA
257	MP	0–2	KuPS
258	KPV	0–1 (aet)	Inter Turku
259	TPS	3–0	FF Jaro

Tie no	Home team	Score	Away team
260	HJK Helsinki	3–0	FC Honka
261	Sudet	0–1	FC Haka
262	SalReipas	1–2	Ilves
263	Gnistan	0–3	IFK Mariehamn

== Quarter-finals ==
This round included the eight winners from the previous round.

9 June 2010
18:00 CEST

TPS	2 – 1	Ilves
Wusu 33'; Johansson 71'		Pessi 58'

Pajbackan kenttä, Pargas

10 June 2010
17:30 CEST

HJK Helsinki	2 – 0	VPS
Parikka 54' 90'

Sonera Stadium, Helsinki

10 June 2010
17:30 CEST

FC Haka	0 – 1	KuPS
		Udah 23'

Tehtaan kenttä, Valkeakoski

10 June 2010
17:30 CEST

IFK Mariehamn	2 – 1	Inter Turku
Paatelainen 47'; Gueye 84'		Egwim 10'

Wiklöf Holding Arena, Mariehamn

== Semi-finals ==
This round includes the four quarter-final winners.

16 June 2010
18:00 CEST

HJK Helsinki	3 – 0	IFK Mariehamn
Parikka 5'; Ojala 66'; Westö 77'

Sonera Stadium, Helsinki

16 June 2010
18:00 CEST

KuPS	1 – 2	TPS
Ollo 44'		Johansson 32'; Riski 75'

Kuopion keskuskenttä, Kuopio

== Final ==
The two semi-final winners participated in this match.

25 September 2010
14:50 EEST

HJK Helsinki	0 – 2	TPS
		Mika Ääritalo 34' Riku Riski 90+1'

Sonera Stadium, Helsinki
Attendance: 5137
Referee: Vesa Pohjonen
