= 2010 Kolmonen – Finnish League Division 3 =

Finnish League Division 3
- Season: 2010
- Champions: TiPS; MPS; JäPS; ViPa; KTP; HauPa; Närpes Kraft; FC Rauma (not promoted); I-Kissat; Tuto
- Promoted: 9 teams above

League tables for teams participating in Kolmonen, the fourth tier of the Finnish soccer league system, in 2010.

== League Tables 2010 ==
=== Helsinki and Uusimaa ===
==== Section 1 ====
Pos	Team	Pld	W	D	L	GF	GA	GD	Pts	Promotion or relegation
1	TiPS	22	14	7	1	53	22	+31	49	Promoted
2	EsPa	22	13	2	7	44	29	+15	41	
3	SAPA	22	9	6	7	38	43	−5	33	
4	FC HIK	22	8	7	7	52	37	+15	31	
5	KyIF FCK1	22	9	4	9	35	44	−9	31	
6	HPS	22	8	6	8	37	38	−1	30	
7	EBK	22	8	6	8	46	49	−3	30	
8	NuPS	22	8	5	9	37	36	+1	29	
9	Pöxyt	22	7	7	8	42	43	−1	28	
10	PPV	22	6	5	11	34	40	−6	23	
11	MPS /Atletico Malmi	22	4	7	11	30	36	−6	19	Relegated
12	MasKi	22	3	8	11	34	65	−31	17	Relegated

==== Section 2 ====
Pos	Team	Pld	W	D	L	GF	GA	GD	Pts	Promotion or relegation
1	MPS	22	19	2	1	72	26	+46	59	Promoted
2	FC Espoo/Akatemia	22	11	4	7	45	28	+17	37	
3	HerTo	22	11	3	8	52	38	+14	36	
4	FC POHU	22	10	5	7	56	36	+20	35	
5	NJS	22	9	6	7	50	39	+11	33	
6	Allianssi Vantaa	22	9	3	10	38	49	−11	30	
7	HDS/Mondial	22	9	2	11	30	48	−18	29	
8	FC Viikingit ed/2	22	8	4	10	36	46	−10	28	
9	Spartak	22	7	5	10	32	39	−7	26	
10	SibboV	22	7	5	10	41	55	−14	26	
11	Ponnistus	22	7	4	11	35	42	−7	25	Relegated
12	VJS	22	3	1	18	29	70	−41	10	Relegated

==== Section 3 ====
Pos	Team	Pld	W	D	L	GF	GA	GD	Pts	Promotion or relegation
1	JäPS	22	21	1	0	121	15	+106	64	Promoted
2	SalReipas	22	17	4	1	73	24	+49	55	
3	HyPS	22	13	2	7	63	40	+23	41	
4	PK-35	22	9	2	11	35	45	−10	29	
5	TuPS	22	7	5	10	33	46	−13	26	
6	PuiU	22	7	5	10	30	43	−13	26	
7	Zenith	22	8	1	13	39	72	−33	25	
8	KOPSE	22	6	6	10	33	48	−15	24	
9	FC Kontu	22	6	6	10	31	56	−25	24	
10	RIlves	22	6	4	12	41	52	−11	22	
11	OPedot	22	6	4	12	27	53	−26	22	Relegated
12	MaKu	22	5	2	15	40	72	−32	17	Relegated

=== South-East Finland (Kaakkois-Suomi) ===
Pos	Team	Pld	W	D	L	GF	GA	GD	Pts	Promotion or relegation
1	KTP	22	18	2	2	57	9	+48	56	Promoted
2	Sudet	22	14	4	4	68	28	+40	46	
3	MiKi	22	13	3	6	54	21	+33	42	
4	STPS	22	12	5	5	70	44	+26	41	
5	Kultsu FC	22	12	3	7	47	37	+10	39	
6	SavU	22	10	4	8	43	34	+9	34	
7	IPS	22	7	3	12	51	49	+2	24	
8	HaPK	22	6	6	10	34	41	−7	24	
9	TsV	22	5	4	13	30	70	−40	19	Relegated
10	SiU	22	0	2	20	18	82	−64	2	Relegated

=== Central and Eastern Finland (Keski- and Itä-Suomi) ===
Pos	Team	Pld	W	D	L	GF	GA	GD	Pts	Promotion or relegation
1	ViPa	22	18	1	3	89	23	+66	55	Promoted
2	Zulimanit	22	15	3	4	54	30	+24	48	
3	SC KuFu-98	22	14	2	6	84	38	+46	44	
4	JPS	22	14	2	6	52	24	+28	44	
5	SiPS	22	13	1	8	65	42	+23	40	
6	JIlves	22	11	3	8	45	41	+4	36	
7	JoPS	22	10	3	9	48	49	−1	33	
8	JIPPO /2	22	9	3	10	43	34	+9	30	
9	BET	22	6	4	12	46	50	−4	22	
10	Huima	22	4	2	16	32	77	−45	14	
11	KeuPa	22	4	1	17	29	100	−71	13	Relegated
12	LehPa	22	0	3	19	19	98	−79	3	Relegated

=== Northern Finland (Pohjois-Suomi) ===
Pos	Team	Pld	W	D	L	GF	GA	GD	Pts	Promotion or relegation
1	HauPa	21	17	1	3	93	20	+73	52	Promoted
2	AC Kajaani	21	16	3	2	93	10	+83	51	
3	Tervarit	21	11	2	8	59	43	+16	35	
4	PS Kemi/2	21	9	4	8	39	48	−9	31	
5	Spartak	21	9	3	9	50	45	+5	30	
6	OuTa	21	6	3	12	33	48	−15	21	
7	OPS-juniorit	21	5	1	15	24	96	−72	16	
8	ToTa	21	2	1	18	15	96	−81	7	Relegated

=== Central Ostrobothnia and Vaasa (Keski-Pohjanmaa and Vaasa) ===
Pos	Team	Pld	W	D	L	GF	GA	GD	Pts	Promotion or relegation
1	Närpes Kraft	24	22	1	1	84	17	+67	67	Promoted
2	Sporting	24	18	3	3	74	31	+43	57	
3	IFK Jakobstad	24	13	1	10	79	55	+24	40	
4	VPS-j	24	11	4	9	55	45	+10	37	
5	SIF	24	10	5	9	51	48	+3	35	
6	Reima	24	9	7	8	53	42	+11	34	
7	Norrvalla FF	24	9	6	9	47	38	+9	33	
8	Virkiä	24	6	11	7	36	52	−16	29	
9	TUS	24	8	4	12	55	60	−5	28	
10	FC KOMU	24	7	7	10	37	42	−5	28	
11	Karhu	24	6	6	12	40	69	−29	24	
12	NIK	24	5	4	15	31	63	−32	19	Relegated
13	IK	24	2	1	21	35	115	−80	7	Relegated

=== Satakunta ===
Pos	Team	Pld	W	D	L	GF	GA	GD	Pts	Qualification or relegation
1	FC Rauma	18	14	2	2	54	18	+36	44	Promotion Playoffs
2	P-Iirot Reservi	18	11	4	3	68	25	+43	37	
3	EuPa	18	10	3	5	61	22	+39	33	
4	MuSa 2	18	9	6	3	32	22	+10	33	
5	PiTU	18	10	2	6	52	39	+13	32	
6	Nasta	18	9	2	7	61	27	+34	29	Relegated
7	TOVE	18	6	5	7	46	49	−3	23	Relegated
8	LuVe	18	5	2	11	31	54	−23	17	Relegated
9	FC Jazz-J2	18	1	1	16	20	67	−47	4	Relegated
10	FC Ulvila	18	1	1	16	9	111	−102	4	Relegated

=== Tampere ===
Pos	Team	Pld	W	D	L	GF	GA	GD	Pts	Promotion or relegation
1	I-Kissat	26	20	4	2	87	19	+68	64	Promotion Playoffs - Promoted
2	FC Tampere FC Tigers	26	17	5	4	72	33	+39	56	
3	FC Haka Koskenpojat	26	16	6	4	81	25	+56	54	
4	NoPS	26	16	4	6	56	38	+18	52	
5	Härmä	26	15	2	9	70	54	+16	47	
6	PJK	26	13	3	10	76	49	+27	42	
7	TPV /2	26	12	5	9	56	40	+16	41	
8	PS-44	26	12	3	11	53	54	−1	39	
9	TKT	26	12	3	11	41	46	−5	39	
10	TP-49	26	10	2	14	52	58	−6	32	Relegated
11	FJK	26	5	4	17	46	65	−19	19	Relegated
12	Pato	26	5	3	18	21	70	−49	18	Relegated
13	TP-T	26	3	2	21	34	93	−59	11	Relegated
14	PP-70	26	2	2	22	26	127	−101	8	Relegated

=== Turku and Åland (Turku and Ahvenanmaa) ===
Pos	Team	Pld	W	D	L	GF	GA	GD	Pts	Promotion or relegation
1	TuTo	22	17	2	3	59	21	+38	53	Promoted
2	Masku	22	12	4	6	55	36	+19	40	
3	TPK	22	11	3	8	47	34	+13	36	
4	Wilpas	22	10	4	8	31	21	+10	34	
5	SIFFK	22	9	6	7	47	35	+12	33	
6	FC Boda	22	9	5	8	36	32	+4	32	
7	FC Inter 2	22	9	3	10	38	38	0	30	
8	Lieto	22	8	3	11	40	62	−22	27	
9	PIF	22	6	7	9	40	45	−5	25	
10	LTU	22	7	2	13	43	54	−11	23	
11	JyTy	22	6	5	11	36	54	−18	23	Relegated
12	HammIK	22	3	6	13	25	65	−40	15	Relegated

== References and sources ==
- Finnish FA
- ResultCode
- Kolmonen (jalkapallo) (in Finnish)
