= 2011 Finnish Cup =

2011 Suomen Cup
Tournament details
- Country: Finland
- Teams: 233

Final positions
- Champions: HJK Helsinki
- Runners-up: KuPS Kuopio

The 2011 Finnish Cup (Finnish: Suomen Cup) is the 57th season of the main annual football (soccer) cup competition in Finland. It is organized as a single-elimination knock–out tournament. Participation in the competition is voluntary.

HJK won the cup after beating KuPS 2–1 in the final. As HJK also won the league, they qualified for the 2012–13 UEFA Champions League and KuPS will enter the first qualifying round of UEFA Europa League as losing cup finalists.

A total of 233 teams registered for the competition. They will enter in different rounds, depending on their position within the league system. Clubs with teams in Kolmonen (level IV) or an inferior league started the competition in Round 1. Teams from Ykkönen (level II) and Kakkonen (level III) will enter in Round 4. The 2011 Veikkausliiga clubs will start from Round 5 onwards, according to their 2011 League Cup finish; teams exiting at the group stage will enter in Round 5, the losing teams of the quarterfinals will begin in Round 6, and all semifinalists will start in Round 7.

The tournament started on 6 January 2011 with the first match of Round 1 and concluded with the Final held on 24 September 2011 at Sonera Stadium, Helsinki.

== Round 1 ==
In this round entered 134 clubs from the Finnish fourth level and below, while the other 45 clubs received byes to the next round. These matches took place between 6 and 29 January 2011.

| Tie no | Date | Home team | Score | Away team |
|---|---|---|---|---|
| 1 | 2011-01-09 | FC ALPC | 1–3 | FC POHU |
| 2 | 2011-01-08 | FC HEIV | 0–7 | Gnistan Ogeli |
| 3 | 2011-01-16 | FC Kiffen/2 | 1–2 | HerTo |
| 4 | 2011-01-08 | SAPA/3 | 2–1 | HJK-j/Kannelmäki |
| 5 | 2011-01-08 | FC Hieho | 2–3 | SAPA |
| 6 | 2011-01-16 | FC POHU/2 | 2–4 | Ponnistus |
| 7 | 2011-01-08 | HIFK/2 | 4–2 | PPJ-Akatemia |
| 8 | 2011-01-17 | HJK-j/Laajasalo | 2–3 | SUMU |
| 9 | 2011-01-08 | Juhlahevoset | ?–? (p) 4–5 | Stallions |
| 10 | 2011-01-08 | FC KaKe | 1–7 | HDS |
| 11 | 2011-01-09 | FC BrBr | 0–4 | HeKuLa |
| 12 | 2011-01-16 | PPJ | 3–0 | KPR |
| 13 | 2011-01-16 | MPS/Old Stars | ?–? (p) 4–2 | Töölön taisto |
| 14 | 2011-01-16 | Kurvin Vauhti | 1–4 | SUMU/2 |
| 15 | 2011-01-19 | PiPo-79 | 0–2 | NoPS |
| 16 | 2011-01-06 | FC Tampere | 1–2 | Härmä |
| 17 | 2011-01-13 | Pato | 0–3 | TPV/2 |
| 18 | 2011-01-17 | PoNU BK | 0–1 | Ikurin Vire |
| 19 | 2011-01-14 | Loiske | 2–3 | TPT |
| 20 | 2011-01-09 | PP-70 | 2–0 | TKT |
| 21 | 2011-01-16 | Parvi | ?–? (p) 4–5 | NePa |
| 22 | 2011-01-20 | Yllätys | 0–6 | JoPS |
| 23 | 2011-01-29 | ToU | 1–11 | SC KuFu-98 |
| 24 | 2011-01-19 | MPR | 1–4 | SiPS |
| 25 | 2011-01-24 | LehPa | 1–4 | Zulimanit |
| 26 | | FC Loviisa | 0–3 (w/o) | STPS |
| 27 | 2011-01-16 | FC Peltirumpu | ?–? (p) 1–4 | PEPO |
| 28 | 2011-01-16 | FC Villisiat | 0–3 | PaPe |
| 29 | 2011-01-15 | HP-47 | 3–0 | Kultsu |
| 30 | | KuP | 0–3 (w/o) | FC PaSa |
| 31 | 2011-01-15 | MYPA FC | 1–9 | IPS |
| 32 | 2011-01-16 | LIK | 0–9 | MiKi |
| 33 | 2011-01-16 | PoPo | 0–3 | PeKa |

| Tie no | Date | Home team | Score | Away team |
|---|---|---|---|---|
| 34 | 2011-01-15 | KPV Akatemia | 3–0 | IFK Jakobstad |
| 35 | 2011-01-09 | FC Sääripotku | 5–0 | IFK Jakobstad/2 |
| 36 | | OuHu | 0–3 (w/o) | KPS |
| 37 | | IK Myran | 4–1 | Friska Viljor |
| 38 | 2011-01-16 | FC Kurd | 1–2 | Kiva |
| 39 | 2011-01-16 | PaRi | 2–4 | JIlves |
| 40 | 2011-01-17 | BET | 0–1 | FC Blackbird |
| 41 | 2011-01-13 | Urho | 1–2 | BET/3 |
| 42 | 2011-01-15 | PasPa | 0–8 | AC Kajaani |
| 43 | 2011-01-16 | FC-88 | 2–2 (p) 3–1 | KajHa |
| 44 | 2011-01-23 | ToVe | 2–1 | PoSa |
| 45 | | Nasta | 3–2 | EuPa/2 |
| 46 | 2011-01-17 | JyTy | 3–0 | PiPS/2 |
| 47 | 2011-01-22 | KaaPS | 0–5 | FC Boda |
| 48 | 2011-01-15 | LTU/2 | 0–4 | MaPS |
| 49 | 2011-01-21 | PiPS | 0–3 | TPK |
| 50 | 2011-01-07 | SaTo | 2–1 | FC RP |
| 51 | 2011-01-22 | KaaPo | 4–2 | PIF |
| 52 | 2011-01-07 | RiRa/2 | 0–4 | AC Vantaa |
| 53 | 2011-01-16 | NuPS/2 | 0–4 | EIF |
| 54 | 2011-01-11 | Nopsa | 1–3 | EsPa |
| 55 | 2011-01-22 | Naseva | 2–3 | FC Espoo/2 |
| 56 | 2011-01-17 | Maski | 1–4 | HyPS |
| 57 | 2011-01-08 | MaKu | 0–1 | NJS |
| 58 | 2011-01-17 | Lahen Pojat JS | 3–0 | NouLa |
| 59 | 2011-01-08 | KyIK-FCK/2 | 0–9 | NuPS |
| 60 | 2011-01-08 | KP-75/SaPo | 0–8 | PK Keski-Uusimaa |
| 61 | 2011-01-09 | Pöxyt | 2–0 | R-Ilves |
| 62 | 2011-01-12 | RiRa | 5–2 | Sibbo V |
| 63 | 2011-01-18 | SalReipas | 1–2 | Stars |
| 64 | 2011-01-07 | KoiPS | 0–2 | IVU |
| 65 | 2011-01-12 | FC Kuffen | ?–? (p) 4–5 | VIFK U |
| 66 | 2011-01-16 | MIF | 0–2 | Virkiä |
| 67 | | Sisu-Pallo | 7–0 | Black Islanders |

== Round 2 ==
The 67 winners from the previous round and the 45 clubs who got a bye entered this round. These matches took place between 14 January and 13 February 2011.

| Tie no | Date | Home team | Score | Away team |
|---|---|---|---|---|
| 68 | 2011-02-05 | HIFK/2 | ?–? (p) 4–5 | Ponnistus |
| 69 | 2011-02-06 | SUMU | 2–1 | SAPA/3 |
| 70 | 2011-02-05 | FC POHU/4 | 0–6 | HDS |
| 71 | 2011-01-14 | HPS | 5–2 | FC Degis |
| 72 | 2011-02-06 | HPS/2 | 0–3 | PPJ |
| 73 | 2011-02-05 | SUMU/2 | 2–1 | Gnistan Roots |
| 74 | 2011-02-05 | Atletico Malmi | 3–2 | SAPA |
| 75 | 2011-02-05 | SAPA/2 | 2–0 | FC Puotila |
| 76 | 2011-02-05 | HeKuLa | 1–5 | PPV |
| 77 | 2011-02-05 | MPS/Old Stars | 1–10 | PK-35 |
| 78 | 2011-02-06 | Vesa | 0–5 | FC POHU |
| 79 | 2011-01-31 | Gnistan Ogeli | 0–3 | HerTo |
| 80 | 2011-02-05 | FC POHU/3 | 4–1 | PPV/2 |
| 81 | 2011-02-06 | Gnistan/2 | 8–1 | Stallions |
| 82 | | PP-70 | ?–? (p) 3–6 | TPT |
| 83 | 2011-02-09 | NePa | 0–7 | NoPS |
| 84 | 2011-01-24 | Ikurin Vire | 0–6 | Härmä |
| 85 | 2011-01-29 | Leki-futis | 0–4 | TPV/2 |
| 86 | 2011-02-09 | SC KuFu-98 | 2–0 | JoPS |
| 87 | 2011-02-05 | US Skädäm | 0–1 | Zulimanit |
| 88 | 2011-01-22 | JoPS/2 | 1–2 | SiPS |
| 89 | 2011-01-28 | HP-47 | ?–? (p) 3–5 | STPS/2 |
| 90 | 2011-01-30 | Kiri | ?–? (p) 3–2 | Purha |
| 91 | 2011-01-29 | HaPK | 0–1 | PEPO |
| 92 | 2011-02-05 | FC PaSa | 2–1 | IPS |
| 93 | 2011-02-04 | PaPe | ?–? (p) 3–5 | STPS |
| 94 | 2011-01-23 | PeKa/2 | 2–0 | Kar-Po |
| 95 | 2011-01-30 | VoPpk | ?–? (p) 7–6 | VKajo |

| Tie no | Date | Home team | Score | Away team |
|---|---|---|---|---|
| 96 | 2011-01-31 | PeKa | 0–2 | MiKi |
| 97 | 2011-01-25 | KPV Akatemia | 2–0 | GBK/2 |
| 98 | 2011-01-29 | IK Myran | 1–2 | KPS |
| 99 | 2011-01-23 | FC Sääripotku | 0–3 | OuRe |
| 100 | 2011-02-09 | JPS | 5–1 | FC Blackbird |
| 101 | 2011-02-04 | Kiva | 4–1 | BET/3 |
| 102 | | BET/2 | 0–9 | JIlves |
| 103 | | F.C. YPA/2 | 0–3 (w/o) | AC Kajaani |
| 104 | 2011-02-05 | FC-88 | 4–0 | Spartak |
| 105 | 2011-02-13 | LuVe | 0–4 | ToVe |
| 106 | 2011-01-29 | EuPa | 8–0 | Nasta |
| 107 | 2011-01-30 | Paiha | 1–10 | MaPS |
| 108 | 2011-02-04 | KaaPo | 3–0 | TPK |
| 109 | 2011-01-30 | JyTy | 2–0 | FC Boda |
| 110 | 2011-02-05 | SaTo | 0–1 | VG-62 |
| 111 | 2011-01-30 | Pöxyt | 2–0 | Stars |
| 112 | 2011-02-05 | Biisonit | 0–1 | RiRa |
| 113 | 2011-02-02 | HooGee | 0–4 | Lahen Pojat JS |
| 114 | 2011-01-23 | Apollo | 6–1 | HooGee/3 |
| 115 | 2011-01-29 | BK-46 Nk2 | ?–? (p) 2–1 | GrIFK/2 |
| 116 | 2011-02-10 | IVU | ?–? (p) 3–4 | FCD |
| 117 | 2011-02-05 | PK Keski-Uusimaa | 3–1 | HyPS |
| 118 | 2011-01-29 | FC Kasiysi | 0–3 | NuPS |
| 119 | 2011-01-22 | NJS | 4–0 | EPS |
| 120 | 2011-02-04 | AC Vantaa | 3–0 | EsPa |
| 121 | 2011-02-02 | EIF | 4–1 | FC Espoo/2 |
| 122 | 2011-02-02 | Sisu-Pallo | 0–4 | FC Korsholm YB |
| 123 | | VIFK U | 3–2 | Virkiä |

== Round 3 ==
The 56 winners from the previous round entered this round of the competition. These matches took place between 6 and 28 February 2011.

| Tie no | Date | Home team | Score | Away team |
|---|---|---|---|---|
| 124 | 2011-02-19 | FC POHU/3 | 0–3 | SAPA/2 |
| 125 | 2011-02-13 | Kiri | 2–6 | FC POHU |
| 126 | 2011-02-19 | Lahen Pojat JS | ?–? (p) 5–3 | FC PaSa |
| 127 | 2011-02-14 | PeKa/2 | 0–5 | HPS |
| 128 | 2011-02-19 | MiKi | ?–? (p) 2–4 | PK Keski-Uusimaa |
| 129 | 2011-02-16 | NJS | 1–3 | AC Vantaa |
| 130 | 2011-02-19 | HDS | ?–? (p) 5–4 | HerTo |
| 131 | 2011-02-19 | Atletico Malmi | 0–4 | PK-35 |
| 132 | 2011-02-26 | PPJ | 1–3 | PPV |
| 133 | 2011-02-19 | PEPO | 3–4 | RiRa |
| 134 | 2011-02-27 | Apollo | 0–5 | STPS |
| 135 | 2011-02-13 | VoPpk | 0–4 | Pöxyt |
| 136 | 2011-02-19 | Gnistan/2 | 0–2 | SUMU/2 |
| 137 | 2011-02-16 | EIF | ?–? (p) 4–2 | NuPS |

| Tie no | Date | Home team | Score | Away team |
|---|---|---|---|---|
| 138 | 2011-02-28 | FCD | 7–1 | BK-46 Nk2 |
| 139 | 2011-02-26 | Ponnistus | 1–0 | SUMU |
| 140 | 2011-02-12 | KaaPo | 2–0 | EuPa |
| 141 | 2011-02-20 | ToVe | 0–3 | NoPS |
| 142 | 2011-02-19 | VG-62 | 1–0 | TPV/2 |
| 143 | 2011-02-16 | TPT | ?–? (p) 3–5 | Härmä |
| 144 | 2011-02-06 | JyTy | 0–2 | MaPS |
| 145 | 2011-02-19 | SC KuFu-98 | 4–0 | JIlves |
| 146 | 2011-02-19 | Kiva | 1–6 | JPS |
| 147 | 2011-02-25 | STPS/2 | 0–4 | Zulimanit |
| 148 | 2011-02-27 | FC Korsholm YB | 1–2 | SiPS |
| 149 | 2011-02-13 | KPV Akatemia | 6–1 | FC-88 |
| 150 | | VIFK U | 6–0 | KPS |
| 151 | 2011-02-13 | OuRe | 0–2 | AC Kajaani |

== Round 4 ==
The 28 winners from the previous round and the 40 clubs from the Ykkönen and Kakkonen entered this round of the competition. These matches took place between 26 February and 21 March 2011.

| Tie no | Date | Home team | Score | Away team |
|---|---|---|---|---|
| 152 | 2011-03-11 | Ponnistus | 0–6 | JäPS |
| 153 | 2011-03-12 | TiPS | 0–2 | FC Lahti |
| 154 | 2011-03-16 | STPS | 0–9 | MP |
| 155 | 2011-03-19 | AC Vantaa | 0–4 | FC Viikingit |
| 156 | 2011-03-12 | FC POHU | 1–2 | Sudet |
| 157 | 2011-03-13 | Lahen Pojat JS | 0–1 | FC KooTeePee |
| 158 | 2011-03-07 | SUMU/2 | 1–8 | HIFK |
| 159 | 2011-03-19 | SAPA/2 | 0–2 | LoPa |
| 160 | 2011-03-21 | FCD | 0–2 | FC Kiffen |
| 161 | 2011-03-13 | PPV | 2–3 | LPS |
| 162 | 2011-03-13 | HPS | 1–3 | FC Espoo |
| 163 | 2011-02-26 | PK-35 | 2–1 | MPS |
| 164 | 2011-03-15 | FC Kuusysi | 2–1 | Atlantis FC Edustus |
| 165 | 2011-03-04 | KTP | 1–3 | Klubi-04 |
| 166 | 2011-02-26 | HDS | 1–0 | FC Futura |
| 167 | 2011-03-13 | PK Keski-Uusimaa | 3–3 (a.e.t.); 2–4 (p) | KäPa |
| 168 | 2011-03-12 | EIF | 4–2 | PK-35 Vantaa |
| 169 | 2011-03-14 | RiRa | 2–5 | Gnistan |
| 170 | 2011-03-12 | Pöxyt | 0–3 | BK-46 |

| Tie no | Date | Home team | Score | Away team |
|---|---|---|---|---|
| 171 | 2011-03-12 | KaaPo | 0–1 | NoPS |
| 172 | 2011-03-08 | MaPS | 6–1 | MuSa |
| 173 | — | FC Jazz | 3–0 (w/o) | TPV |
| 174 | 2011-03-12 | TuTo | 2–2 (a.e.t.); 5–6 (p) | FC Hämeenlinna |
| 175 | 2011-03-08 | Härmä | 3–1 | I-Kissat |
| 176 | 2011-03-12 | VG-62 | 1–3 | FCV |
| 177 | 2011-03-20 | Ilves | 2–3 | P-Iirot |
| 178 | 2011-03-12 | JPS | 2–3 | SC Riverball |
| 179 | 2011-03-13 | SiPS | 0–4 | ViPa |
| 180 | 2011-03-17 | SC KuFu-98 | 1–1 (a.e.t.); 2–4 (p) | JIPPO |
| 181 | 2011-03-05 | Zulimanit | 1–0 | PK-37 |
| 182 | 2011-03-12 | VIFK U | 1–3 | SJK |
| 183 | 2011-03-05 | AC Kajaani | 0–0 (a.e.t.); 2–4 (p) | FC Santa Claus |
| 184 | 2011-03-08 | KPV Akatemia | 1–2 | GBK |
| 185 | 2011-03-12 | JBK | 2–0 | HauPa |

== Round 5 ==
The 34 winners from the previous round and six clubs eliminated from the group stage of the 2011 Finnish League Cup will enter this round of the competition. The draw was conducted on 3 March 2011 by Finnish FA representative Petri Jakonen. If teams from different levels were drawn together, the lower-league team were assigned as the home team. The matches of this round will take place between 17 March and 2 April 2011.

| 27 March 2011 Match 186 | RoPS | 0–1 | VPS |
| 16:00 UTC+3 |

| 28 March 2011 Match 187 | Zulimanit | 1–2 | ViPa | Jalkapallohalli, Kuopio |
| 19:30 UTC+3 |

| 26 March 2011 Match 188 | MaPS | 4–2 | FCV | Liedon htn, |
| 16:30 UTC+2 |

| 27 March 2011 Match 189 | SC Riverball | 3–6 (a.e.t.) | AC Oulu | Koillispuiston tekonurmi, Joensuu |
| 15:00 UTC+3 |

| 26 March 2011 Match 190 | JBK | 6–0 | P-Iirot | Tellushalli, Jakobstad |
| 14:30 UTC+2 |

| 20 March 2011 Match 191 | GBK | 4–3 (a.e.t.) | FC Santa Claus | Kipparihalli, Kokkola |
| 15:30 UTC+2 | M. Ebongue 14'; J. Roiko 90', 104'; T. Wentin 113' (pen.) | Report (in Finnish) | S. Viitasaari 27'; A. Peura 37'; S. Roiha 103' |

| 26 March 2011 Match 192 | SJK | 4–0 | FC Jazz | Wallsport Areena, Seinäjoki |
| 14:30 UTC+2 |

| 26 March 2011 Match 193 | MP | 0–1 | JIPPO | Urpolan tekonurmi, Mikkeli |
| 17:30 UTC+2 |

| 30 March 2011 Match 194 | FC Viikingit | 0–1 | IFK Mariehamn | Fair Pay Areena, Helsinki |
| 15:00 UTC+3 |

| 26 March 2011 Match 195 | PK-35 | 3–1 | Klubi-04 | ISS Stadion, Vantaa |
| 13:30 UTC+2 |

| 31 March 2011 Match 196 | Härmä | 1–1 (a.e.t.) (4–5 p) | Gnistan |
| 21:30 UTC+3 |

| 2 April 2011 Match 197 | LoPa | 0–4 | FC Haka | Leppävaaran tekonurmi, Espoo |
| 17:30 UTC+3 |

| 26 March 2011 Match 198 | LPS | 4–1 (a.e.t.) | KäPa | Talin halli, Helsinki |
| 15:00 UTC+2 |

| 29 March 2011 Match 199 | FC Kiffen | 0–1 | FC Espoo |

| 30 March 2011 Match 200 | JäPS | 0–3 | FC KooTeePee | Lukion tekonurmi, Järvenpää |
| 18:30 UTC+3 |

| 26 March 2011 Match 201 | FC Kuusysi | 1–3 | FC Hämeenlinna | Kisapuiston tekonurmi, Lahti |
| 16:00 UTC+2 |

| 26 March 2011 Match 202 | HDS | 1–1 (a.e.t.) (4–6 p) | Sudet | Töölö PK 6, Helsinki |
| 19:30 UTC+2 |

| 26 March 2011 Match 203 | EIF | 1–1 (a.e.t.) (4–3 p) | HIFK | Karjaan tekonurmi, Raseborg |
| 16:00 UTC+2 |

| 27 March 2011 Match 204 | BK-46 | 0–1 | FC Lahti | Karjaan tekonurmi, Raseborg |
| 16:00 UTC+3 |

| 26 March 2011 Match 205 | NoPS | 0–9 | MyPa | Kaukajärvi tekonurmi, Tampere |
| 16:00 UTC+2 |

== Round 6 ==
The 20 winners from the previous round and four clubs eliminated in the quarterfinals of the 2011 Finnish League Cup will enter this round of the competition. The draw was conducted on 24 March 2011. If teams from different levels were drawn together, the lower-league team were assigned as the home team. The matches of this round will take place between 1 and 11 April 2011.

All times UTC+3

| 10 April 2011 Match 206 | LPS | 0–8 | IFK Mariehamn |
| 13:30 |

| 9 April 2011 Match 207 | ViPa | 1–4 | FF Jaro |
| 18:15 |

| 10 April 2011 Match 208 | EIF | 0–2 | KuPS |
| 15:00 |

| 13 April 2011 Match 209 | MyPa | 2–0 | AC Oulu |
| 17:00 |

| 9 April 2011 Match 210 | PK-35 | 2–0 | FC Hämeenlinna |
| 13:00 |

| 12 April 2011 Match 211 | TPS | 2–2 (a.e.t.) (5–4 p) | VPS |
| 18:30 |

| 9 April 2011 Match 212 | JIPPO | 0–0 (a.e.t.) (4–2 p) | JBK |
| 14:00 |

| 13 April 2011 Match 213 | FC Lahti | 2–1 | FC Espoo |
| 17:00 |

| 8 April 2011 Match 214 | FC Inter Turku | 0–0 (a.e.t.) (2–4 p) | FC Haka |
| 18:00 |

| 9 April 2011 Match 215 | Gnistan | 3–0 | Sudet |
| 20:00 |

| 10 April 2011 Match 216 | SJK | 3–0 | FC KooTeePee |
| 13:30 |

| 9 April 2011 Match 217 | GBK | 3–1 (a.e.t.) | MaPS |
| 15:30 |

== Round 7 ==
The 12 winners from the last round joined the four semifinalists of the 2011 Finnish League Cup in this round of the competition. These matches were played between 15 and 23 April 2011.

All times UTC+3

| 15 April 2011 Match 218 | IFK Mariehamn | 1–0 | FC Honka |
| 18:00 |

| 15 April 2011 Match 219 | PK-35 | 0–8 | JJK | ISS Stadion, Vantaa |
| 17:30 |

| 23 April 2011 Match 220 | SJK | 0–4 | HJK | Jouppilanvuoren tekonurmi, Seinäjoki |
| 14:00 |

| 16 April 2011 Match 221 | Gnistan | 2–6 | KuPS | FAIR PAY Areena, Helsinki |
| 15:30 |

| 17 April 2011 Match 222 | MyPa | 3–1 | FF Jaro | Lehtomäki tekonurmi, Kouvola |
| 17:30 |

| 17 April 2011 Match 223 | GBK | 0–2 | FC Haka | Kipparihalli, Kokkola |
| 18:00 |

| 21 April 2011 Match 224 | FC Lahti | 2–0 | TPS | Kisapuiston tekonurmi, Lahti |
| 17:00 |

| 16 April 2011 Match 225 | JIPPO | 2–1 (a.e.t.) | Tampere United | Joensuun Koillispuisto tekonurmi, Joensuu |
| 14:00 |

== Quarterfinals ==
The 8 winners from the previous stage of the competition enter this round.

All times UTC+3

| 28 April 2011 Match 226 | MyPa | 1–2 | HJK | Lehtomäki tekonurmi, Kouvola |
| 17:30 | Innanen 27' | | Zeneli 21'; Mannström 77' |

| 28 April 2011 Match 227 | IFK Mariehamn | 4–0 | JIPPO | Wiklöf Holding Arena, Mariehamn |
| 18:30 | Lehtinen 7', 83'; Forsell 33'; Helmke 65' |

| 28 April 2011 Match 228 | FC Haka | 0–2 | KuPS | Tehtaan kenttä, Valkeakoski |
| 18:30 | | | Kaivonurmi 47', 63' |

| 29 April 2011 Match 229 | FC Lahti | 4−3 | JJK | Kisapuisto, Lahti |
| 17:00 | Hauhia 69', Sinisalo 80', Laitinen 84', Turunen 88' | | Kari 48' (pen.), 51' , Manninen 63' |

== Semifinals ==
The 4 winners from the previous stage compete in this round of the competition.

All times UTC+3

| 26 May 2011 Match 230 | IFK Mariehamn | 0–3 | KuPS | Wiklöf Holding Arena, Mariehamn |
| 18:30 | | | 6', 79' Nwakaeme; 64' Ilo | Referee: Jouni Hyytiä |

| 26 May 2011 Match 231 | HJK | 3–0 | FC Lahti | Sonera Stadium, Helsinki |
| 18:30 | Parikka 49' (pen.); Moren 54'; Sadik 89' | | | Referee: Tony Asumaa |

== Final ==
All times UTC+3

| 24 September 2011 Match 232 | KuPS | 1–2 (a.e.t.) | HJK | Sonera Stadium, Helsinki |
| 15:30 | Joenmäki 119' | | 108' Litmanen; 116' Ring | Referee: Jouni Hyytiä |
