= 2001 Finnish Cup =

2001 Suomen Cup
Tournament details
- Country: Finland
- Teams: 274

The 2001 Finnish Cup (Finnish: Suomen Cup) was the 47th season of the main annual association football cup competition in Finland. It was organised as a single-elimination knock–out tournament and participation in the competition was voluntary. A total of 274 teams registered for the competition. The final was held at the Tammela Stadion, Tampere on 12 November 2001 with Atlantis FC defeating Tampere United by 1-0 before an attendance of 3,820 spectators.

== Teams ==
Round	Clubs remaining	Clubs involved	Winners from previous round	New entries this round	Leagues entering at this round
Preliminary round	274	130	none	130	Kolmonen (Tier 4); Nelonen (Tier 5); Vitonen (Tier 6); Kutonen (Tier 7); Seiska (Tier 8); Others (including Veterans and Youth)
Round 1	209	160	65	95	see above
Round 2	129	106	80	26	Kakkonen (Tier 3) - 26 teams
Round 3	76	64	53	11	Ykkönen (Tier 2) - 11 teams
Round 4	44	32	32	none	none
Round 5	28	24	16	8	Veikkausliiga (Tier 1) - 8 teams
Round 6	16	16	12	4	Veikkausliiga (Tier 1) - 4 teams
Quarter-finals	8	8	8	none	none
Semi-finals	4	4	4	none	none
Final	2	2	2	none	none

== Preliminary round ==
Tie no	Home team	Score	Away team	Information
1	Arsenal	1-7	FC Kontu	
2	FC POHU/3	4-7	Athletico Jerkku	
3	PK-35	2-0	RoU	
4	Atlantis/3	2-1	HeKuLa	
5	Zyklon/1	4-0	FC POHU/A	
6	FC SUOKKI	2-4	Itä-Helsingin Juoni	
7	Jalka-Pallo	1-4	LaaPS/2	
8	Puistolan Urh	4-1	Zenith	
9	Arsenal/JKKI	0-3	Gnistan/A	Arsenal/JKKI withdrew
10	FC POHU/4	1-14	SC Kuninkaat	
11	PK-35/JKKI	5-1	FC HIFK/2	
12	Otaniemen Jyllääjät Espoo	2-15	JP-seura Stars Lahti	
13	Kilo IF	3-7	Karjalohjan Urh	
14	SC Oldstars	0-3	Pöxyt/1	SC Oldstars withdrew
15	LoPa	12-0	KoiPS	
16	FC Vantaa/JKKI	0-6	Orimattilan Pedot	
17	Grillin PS Karkkila	1-2	Black Bee's Orimattila	
18	AC Vantaa/A	0-4	FC Espoo	
19	EPSJP	0-7	FC Dynamo Kerava	
20	Rekolan Pallo -93	3-8	Riipilän Raketit	
21	FC Näädät	2-3	FC HaNa/2 Hausjärvi	
22	Kelohonka	5-1	Sibbo Vargarna	
23	KP-75 Kerava	4-1	Jokelan Kisa	
24	KOOVEE Tampere	1-4	Härmä Hämeelinna	
25	CST Tampere	2-4	FJK Forssa	
26	NoPS Nokia	2-3 (aet)	Kangasalan Voitto	
27	FC Reilu Tampere	1-2	FC Haka/A	
28	VaPS JP Vammala	4-1	TKT/2	
29	PiPo-79 Pispala	1-3	FC Ilves/JKKI	
30	PP-70/2 Tampere	5-1	I-Raikku Kangasala	
31	PK-37/2	1-2	FC Rebels Joensuu	
32	KuPS/A	(3-3); 2-4 (p.)	PK-37/1	
33	SC KuFu-98	3-0	SiPS/2	

Tie no	Home team	Score	Away team	Information
34	Rautavaaran Raiku	2-4	Rautalammin Urh	
35	MyPa/A	3-0	PEPO/2	
36	VoPK	8-0	HiHa Mikkeli	
37	Savitaipaleen Urh	1-2 (aet)	SKT-Futis Hamina	
38	SavilahdenU	0-3	Kausalan Yr	SavilahdenU withdrew
39	BUTA/JKKI	0-3	FC Bilis Otava	BUTA/JKKI withdrew
40	Luumäen Pojat	2-1	FCV Elimäki	
41	FC Ilves/A	0-1	Sääksjärven Loiske	
42	TKT Tampere	1-2	FC Haka/A	
43	Liljendal IK	1-6	Ristiinan Pallo	
44	IK Myran	3-2	Jymy Kokkola	
45	Kalajoen Pallo	6-1	Kaustisen Pohjan-Veikot	
46	KPV-j/A	6-0	Oulaisten Huima	
47	JIlves	2-4	Huima	
48	JJK Jyväskylä/A	2-0	FC Keitelejazz	
49	Kampuksen Dynamo	0-10	Lohikosken PK	
50	Dreeverit/1 Oulu	1-6	FC Kurenpojat	
51	FC Kanuunat Kajanni	3-0	OTP	OTP withdrew
52	FC Rio Grande Rovaniemi	10-2	FC NETS Oulu	
53	FC Eurajoki	0-4	Ysterin Pallo	
54	RuoVi/JKKI	3-4	Isojoenrannan Mahti	
55	PoPa	1-2	RuoVi	
56	Reposaaren Kunto	0-1	Nakkilan Nasta	
57	EuPa	4-1	FC Jazz/JKKI	
58	Perniön Urheilijat	8-2	Nations United Turku	
59	Inter Turku/A	3-0	KaaPo/A	KaaPo/A withdrew
60	KaaPo/2	4-0	UPK Uuisikaupunki	
61	PiPS	3-2	TuTo	
62	Sisu/2	2-5	Lapuan Virkiä/2	
63	Lapuan Virkiä/1	9-1	Vähänkyrön Viesti	
64	Sisu/1	3-0	VPS/A2	VPS/A2 withdrew
65	BK-IFK	1-3	Kauhajoen Karhu	

== Round 1 ==
Tie no	Home team	Score	Away team	Information
66	FC POHU/2	0-6	PK-35	
67	FC Kontu	1-4	HJK/A	
68	Marmiksen Kuula	12-2	FC Pakila/1	
69	Atlantis/3	5-1	FC Homer	
70	PuiU	1-8	Atlantis/A	
71	PK-35/JKKI	8-0	FC Pakila/2	
72	Athletico Jerkku	19-0	Projekti 2000	
73	FC Ogeli	2-1	Laajasalon PS/1	
74	Zyklon/2	0-7	Laajasalon PS/2	
75	FC POHU/1	3-2	PK-35/A	
76	PETO	0-4	Mondial Stars	
77	Gnistan/A	3-7	Zyklon/1	
78	SC Kuninkaat	13-1	Itä-Helsingin Juoni	
79	AC Helsinki	4-2	OT-77	
80	JP-seura Stars	4-0	VPP Vantaa	
81	FC Dynamo	0-3	KP-75	
82	FC Itä-Vantaa	2-3	Karjalohjan Urh	
83	Kelohonka	0-5	Korvenpojat	
84	PMPS Espoo	0-5	KOPSE	
85	FC Pallo-Lahti	4-3	Sexypöxyt/1	
86	FC Lohja	0-3	FC Espoo	
87	FC Pathoven	0-9	FC Honka/A	
88	Kuusysi/A	11-0	Riihimäen Sarvet	
89	Ingå IF	0-5	NuPS	
90	FC HaNa/2	0-2	EBK	
91	FC Lohja/JKKI	0-1	Sexypöxyt/2	
92	Riipilän Raketit	3-2	PUPO FC	
93	BET Jyväskylä	0-3	City Stars Lahti	BET Jyväskylä withdrew
94	LoPa	7-0	Black Bee's	
95	Orimattilan Pedot	1-2	FC HaNa/1	
96	Kangasalan Voitto	5-0	Norsulauma	
97	Pirkkalan JK	0-2	Loiske Sääksjärvi	
98	VaPS JP	4-1	PP-70/2	
99	FC Ilves/JKKI	1-8	FC Haka/A	
100	ErHu Tampere	8-1	Larninpään Pallopeli Pro	
101	Härmä Hämeenlinna	1-2	ViiPV	
102	Pato Tervakoski	12-0	FC Kuiva Hämeenlinna	
103	Forssan JK	8-0	Nekalan Pallo Tampere	
104	FC Rebels	3-4	Rautalammin Urh	
105	SC KuFu-98	3-1	PK-37/1	
106	SiPS/1	11-1	LehPa-77	
107	NP-H	2-5	Manhattan Projekt	

Tie no	Home team	Score	Away team	Information
108	JuPy	1-3	Ratanat/A	
109	KTP	4-3	FC Pantterit Joutseno	
110	LiPo	7-2	Voikkan PK	
111	Ristiinan Pallo	4-2 (aet)	Kausalan Yritys	
112	FC Bilis Otava	6-2	SummanK-T Hamina	
113	Virolahden Sampo	2-4	Rakuunat/2	
114	LAUTP	0-4	FC PASA	
115	MyPa A	8-0	Kotkan Futis	
116	FC Loviisa	2-3 (aet)	Valkean Kajo	
117	KTP/A	1-3	Simpeleen Urh	
118	Popin. Ponnistus	1-2 (aet)	FC Kkoski/2	
119	Huima	1-1; 2-4 (p.)	JJK A	
120	Pallohait/JKKI	4-1	Haapamäen Pallo-Pojat	
121	LohikPK	2-0	Pallohait Vihtavuori	
122	IK Myran	2-1	Sievin Sisu	
123	Kalajoen Pallo	1-3	Lohtajan Veikot	
124	KPS	1-3	KPV-j A	
125	GBK/A	2-1	Öja-73	
126	Tervalaakson Teräs Vaasa	2-3	Lapuan Virkiä/2	
127	Lapuan Virkiä/1	2-2; 2-4 (p.)	KaKa	
128	Sisu 1	5-2	FC Sport-39	
129	SIF	5-1	FC Järviseutu	
130	Korsnäs FF	0-4	VPS/A1	
131	Kolarin Kontio	0-3	FC Kurenpojat	Kolarin Kontio withdrew
132	FC Rio Grande Rovaniemi	3-1	FC Hercules Oulu	
133	Namman Luja Rovaniemi	3-2	FC Raahe	
134	KaPa Kajaani	4-0	FC Kanuunat Kajanni	
135	Dreeverit/2 Oulu	0-6	Oulun Tarmo	
136	NaNa	0-1	Huhtamon Nuorisoseuran Urh	
137	Yyterin Pallo	4-3 (aet)	Isojoenrannan Mahti	
138	FC Jazz/A	1-2	Toejoen Veikot Pori	
139	MuSa/A	1-6	RuoVi	
140	EuPa	2-7	P-Iirot/A	
141	Perniön Urheilijat	4-0	PiPS	
142	TPK/A	6-0	FC Tykit	
143	G.P.R. FC Turku	3-7	RaiFu	
144	Inter Turku/A	7-1	KaaPo/2	
145	Turun Pyrkivä	0-9	Kokemäen Kova-Väki	

== Round 2 ==
Tie no	Home team	Score	Away team	Information
146	Athletico Jerkku	2-1	Gnistan/A	
147	Marmiksen Kuula	2-1	FC POHU/1	
148	LaaPS/2	1-17	HJK/A	
149	Mondial Stars	2-0	AC Helsinki	
150	Atlantis/A	1-3	Viikingit	
151	SC Kuninkaat	0-8	FC Ogeli	
152	Atlantis/3	0-2	Ponnistajat	
153	PK-35	0-2	PK-35/JKKI	
154	Kelohonka	1-3	KOPSE	
155	JP-seura Stars	4-4; 3-4 (p.)	Riipilän Raketit	
156	EBK	0-3	LoPa	
157	City Stars	10-2	Nateva	
158	FC HaNa/1	0-1	Karjalohjan Urh	
159	TP-Lahti	1-2	JäPS	
160	FC Honka/A	1-3	NuPS	
161	Kuusysi/A	1-4	FC Pallo-Lahti	
162	FC Espoo	1-0	LePa	
163	KP-75	3-2	Sexypöxyt/2	
164	KaVo	0-2	Loiske	
165	FC Haka/A	4-1	Eerolan Hurjat	
166	ViiPV	0-5	VaPS JP	
167	Forssan JK	1-2	PS-44	
168	Tervakosken Pato	1-5	PP-70/1	
169	KK-V Kokemäki	1-2	TPV	
170	Ruosniemen Visa	2-1	Huhtamon Nuorisoseuran Urh	
171	P-Iirot/A	3-0	FC Rauma	

Tie no	Home team	Score	Away team	Information
172	Yyterin Pallo	1-2	Toejoen Veikot	
173	TPK/A	6-0	RaiFu Raisio	
174	Perniön Urh	0-12	ÅIFK	
175	VG-62	2-1	PIF	
176	Inter Turku/A	2-1	KaaPo	
177	Ristiinan Pallo	1-5	Voikkaan PK	
178	MyPa/A	2-1	PEPO	
179	Valkealan Kajo	1-4	Simpeleen Urh	
180	KTP	1-2	KOOTEEPEE	
181	FC PASA	1-2	FC Bilis	
182	FC Kuusankoski/2	2-5	Rakuunat/2	
183	Lohikosken PK	1-3	JJK	
184	JJK/A	0-3	Pallohait/JKKI	
185	JiiPee	0-1	Ratanat	
186	Manhattan Projekt	1-0	Kings SC	
187	SiPS/1	1-5	Koparit	
188	SC KuFu-98	2-0	Warkaus JK	
189	Ratanat/A	3-2	Rautalammin Urh	
190	KPV-j	3-2	FC YPA	
191	IK Myran	0-1	Lohtajan Veikot	
192	GBK/A	2-5	FC Korsholm	
193	KaPa Kajaani	3-0	KPV-j/A	
194	Virkiä/2	1-4	VPS/A	
195	Kauhajoen Karhu	3-1	Sepsi-78	
196	Seinäjoen Sisu	0-1	Sundom IF	
197	Oulun Tarmo	3-1	FC Kurenpojat	
198	Namman Luja	2-3	FC Rio Grande Rovaniemi	

== Round 3 ==
Tie no	Home team	Score	Away team	Information
199	Marmiksen Kuula	0-0; 3-2 (p.)	FC Ogeli	
200	Mondial Stars	2-4	FC Espoo	
201	PK-35/JKKI	1-0	JäPS	
202	FC Pallo-Lahti	0-8	KOOTEEPEE	
203	Ponnistajat	6-1	Riipilän Raketit	
204	Viikingit	1-4	Jokrut	
205	Athletico Jerkku	3-4 (aet)	NuPS	
206	City Stars	0-5	IF Gnistan	
207	KP-75	1-2	KOPSE	
208	Karjalohjan Urh	1-3	HJK/A	
209	LoPa	0-4	AC Vantaa	
210	FC Haka/A	1-0	TPV	
211	ÅIFK	4-3	PP-70/1	
212	Ruovi	1-2	Inter Turku/A	
213	Sääksjärven Loiske	0-2	SalPa	
214	VaPS JP	2-3	P-Iirot/A	
215	Toejoen Veikot	1-2	PS-44	

Tie no	Home team	Score	Away team	Information
216	VG-62	1-3	TPS	
217	TPK/A	0-4	TPK	
218	Manhattan Projekt	4-1	Simpeleen Urh	
219	Koparit	0-0; 3-4 (p.)	Rakuunat	
220	Ratanat/A	0-3	FC Bilis	
221	JJK	0-0; 4-3 (p.)	Pallohait/JKKI	
222	Rakuunat/2	1-3 (aet)	FC Mikkeli	
223	SC KuFu-98	0-1	Ratanat	
224	Voikkaan PK	1-3	MyPa/A	
225	KPV-j	5-0	Kauhajoen Karhu	
226	Lohtajan Veikot	0-8	FF Jaro	
227	SIF	9-0	TP-Seinäjoki	
228	FC Korsholm	3-0	VPS/A	
229	Oulun Tarmo	1-1; 2-4 (p.)	KaPa	
230	FC Rio Grande	0-2	Tervarit	

== Round 4 ==
Tie no	Home team	Score	Away team	Information
231	IF Gnistan	0-1	AC Vantaa	
232	FC Espoo	2-4	PK-35/JKKI	
233	Marmiksen Kuula	0-2	KOPSE	
234	Jokrut	4-1	Ponnistajat	
235	NuPS	1-0	HJK/A	
236	PS-44	0-1	SalPa	
237	TPK	0-3	TPS	
238	Inter Turku/A	7-2	P-Iirot/A	

Tie no	Home team	Score	Away team	Information
239	FC Haka/A	1-5	ÅIFK	
240	Manhattan Projekt	3-8	FC Mikkeli	
241	JJK	8-1	FC Bilis	
242	MyPa/A	1-3	KOOTEEPEE	
243	Ratanat	0-2	Rakuunat|	
244	FF Jaro	12-1	SIF	
245	KPV-j	3-2	FC Korsholm	
246	KaPa	2-2; 3-2 (p.)	Tervarit	

== Round 5 ==
Tie no	Home team	Score	Away team	Information
247	FC Jazz	0-1	Tampere United	
248	FF Jaro	0-1	Atlantis FC	
249	Inter Turku/A	0-1	FC Mikkeli	
250	Jokrut	2-5	AC Vantaa	
251	JJK	0-6	RoPS	
252	KaPa	1-4	TPS	

Tie no	Home team	Score	Away team	Information
253	KOOTEEPEE	2-3	FC Lahti	
254	KOPSE	0-7	VPS	
255	KPV-j	0-1	ÅIFK	
256	KuPS	1-3	Inter Turku	
257	NuPS	1-4	SalPa	
258	PK-35/JKKI	1-3	Rakuunat	

== Round 6 ==
Tie no	Home team	Score	Away team	Information
259	AC Vantaa	0-2	Jokerit	
260	FC Mikkeli	0-5	FC Lahti	
261	HJK	1-2 (aet)	Atlantis FC	
262	Rakuunat	0-2	FC Haka	

Tie no	Home team	Score	Away team	Information
263	RoPS	1-1; 2-4 (p.)	Tampere United	
264	SalPa	1-3	Inter Turku	
265	TPS	2-1	VPS	
266	ÅIFK	0-4	MyPa	

== Quarter-finals ==
Tie no	Home team	Score	Away team	Information
267	FC Haka	4-1	TPS	
268	Inter Turku	0-0; 2-3 (p.)	Tampere United	

Tie no	Home team	Score	Away team	Information
269	Jokerit	1-1; 3-5 (p.)	MyPa	
270	FC Lahti	0-2	Atlantis FC	

== Semi-finals ==
Tie no	Home team	Score	Away team	Information
271	Tampere United	1-1; 4-2 (p.)	MyPa	

Tie no	Home team	Score	Away team	Information
272	FC Haka	1-2	Atlantis FC	

== Final ==
Tie no	Team 1	Score	Team 2	Information
273	Atlantis FC	1-0	Tampere United	Att. 3,820
