= Aleksandr Mishchuk =

Russian former footballer (born 1977)

Personal information
- Full name: Aleksandr Aleksandrovitš Mištšuk
- Date of birth: 22 April 1977 (age 49)
- Place of birth: Moscow, Soviet Union
- Height: 1.93 m (6 ft 4 in)
- Position: Goalkeeper

Youth career
- Dynamo Moscow

Senior career*
Years	Team	Apps	(Gls)
1993–2000	Dynamo-2 Moscow	214	(0)
2001	Kuban Krasnodar	3	(0)
2001	Atlantis	7	(0)
2002–2003	Allianssi	36	(0)
2003	→ AC Vantaa (loan)	4	(0)
2004	TP-47	25	(0)
2005	Anzhi Makhachkala	5	(0)
2006	Atlantis	20	(0)

International career
1999	Russia U21	1	(0)
- * Club domestic league appearances and goals

Aleksandr Aleksandrovitch Mishchuk (Russian: Мищук Александр Александрович; born 22 April 1977) is a Russian former football goalkeeper and a convicted felon. Besides in his native Russia, he played in Finland for Atlantis, AC Allianssi, AC Vantaa and TP-47, totalling 68 appearances in top-tier Veikkausliiga. He also holds a Finnish citizenship.

== Conviction of bribery ==
In September 2006, when playing for Atlantis against RoPS in a Ykkönen match, Mishchuk conceded strange goals, sparking a suspicions of match fixing, as the match had been betted with exceptional volume. He was sidelined by his club, and Atlantis asked the league and the Football Association of Finland to investigate whether his actions were intentional. Before the season, the club had been already warned of him by Veikkaus, as there had been similar suspicions and investigations earlier.

In September 2007, it was reported that Mishchuk was sued to the Helsinki District Court for receiving bribes. In December it was reported that he was suspected of accepting a €1,500 bribe for match fixing. The prosecutor called for a probationary prison sentence. Later he was found guilty and given a four-month probationary prison sentence with a €3,500 fine. He was also given a ban by the committee of the Finnish FA.

== Honours ==
Atlantis

- Finnish Cup: 2001
