= Mika Lähderinne =

Finnish footballer (born 1980)

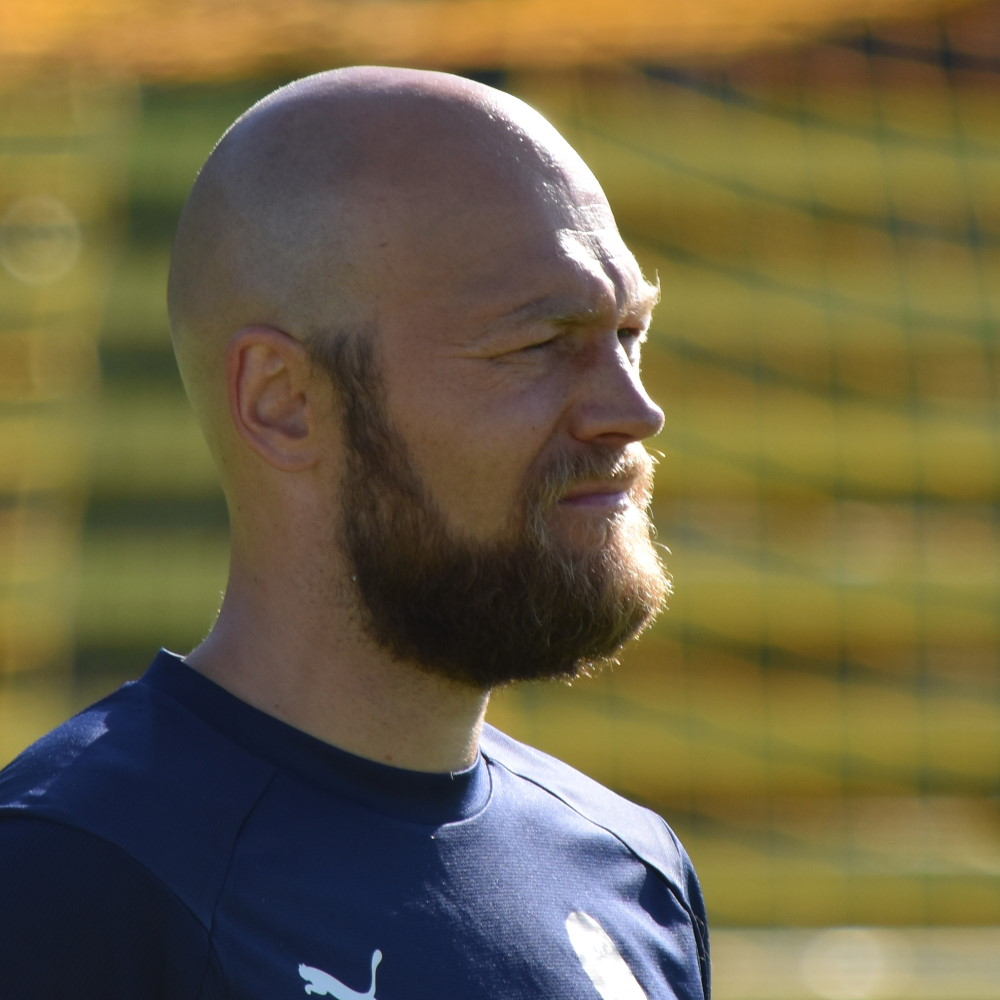
- Lähderinne with KuPS in 2020

Personal information
- Date of birth: 8 May 1980 (age 46)
- Place of birth: Kiuruvesi, Finland
- Height: 1.83 m (6 ft 0 in)
- Position: Defender

Youth career
- Kiuruveden Urheilijat

Senior career*
| Years | Team | Apps | (Gls) |
| 1999 | PK-37 | 21 | (2) |
| 2000–2001 | KuPS | 3 | (0) |
| 2002 | PK-37 | 17 | (0) |
| 2003 | Warkaus JK | 22 | (4) |
| 2004 | KuPS | 23 | (3) |
| 2005 | TP-47 | 15 | (0) |
| 2006–2008 | Jippo | 69 | (5) |
| 2009 | KPV | 24 | (2) |
| 2010–2011 | AC Oulu | 27 | (4) |
| 2010 | → KPV (loan) | 2 | (0) |
| 2012–2013 | PK-37 | 51 | (4) |

Managerial career
- 2012–2013: PK-37 (player-coach)
- 2014: Jippo
- 2015–2017: KuPS (U19)
- 2018–2019: AC Oulu
- 2020–2023: KuPS (fitness coach)
- 2024–: KuPS (assistant)
- * Club domestic league appearances and goals

Mika Lähderinne (born 8 May 1980) is a Finnish football coach and a former player, who played as a defender. He is an assistant coach of Veikkausliiga club KuPS.

== Managerial statistics ==
| Team | Nat | From | To | Record | | | | |
| Team | Nat | From | To | G | W | D | L | Win % |
|---|---|---|---|---|---|---|---|---|
| Jippo | (Finland) | 1 January 2014 | 31 December 2014 | 27 | 5 | 5 | 17 | 18.52 |
| AC Oulu | (Finland) | 1 January 2018 | 22 June 2019 | 48 | 22 | 10 | 16 | 45.83 |
| Total | | | | 75 | 27 | 15 | 33 | 36.00 |
