= Médoune Gueye =

French footballer (born 1982)

Personal information
- Date of birth: 28 March 1982 (age 44)
- Height: 1.95 m (6 ft 5 in)
- Position: Defender

Senior career*
| Years | Team | Apps | (Gls) |
| 2009–2010 | L'Entente SSG | 19 | (0) |
| 2010 | IFK Mariehamn | 18 | (0) |
| 2010–2014 | Mantes | 95 | (4) |
- * Club domestic league appearances and goals

Médoune Gueye (born 28 March 1982) is a French former professional footballer who played as a defender.
