= Markus Joenmäki =

Finnish footballer (born 1988)

Personal information
- Date of birth: 11 February 1988 (age 38)
- Place of birth: Finland
- Height: 1.85 m (6 ft 1 in)
- Position: Defender

Team information
- Current team: FC Lahti
- Number: 8

Senior career*
Years	Team	Apps	(Gls)
2005–2008	FC Hämeenlinna	54	(4)
2009–2010	FC Haka	31	(0)
2011–2012	KuPS	44	(2)
2013–2014	FC Lahti	30	(2)
- * Club domestic league appearances and goals as of 29 June 2010

Markus Joenmäki is a Finnish former professional footballer who played as a defender.
