= Johannes Westö =

Finnish footballer (born 1991)

Personal information
- Date of birth: 1 April 1991 (age 35)
- Place of birth: Finland
- Height: 1.76 m (5 ft 9 1/2 in)
- Position: Midfielder

Youth career
- HJK
- 2007–2009: Klubi-04

Senior career*
Years	Team	Apps	(Gls)
2009–2010	HJK	24	(3)

International career
- Finland U-19
2010	Finland U21	2	(0)
- * Club domestic league appearances and goals

Johannes Westö (born 1 April 1991) is a Finnish former footballer. During the 2010 Veikkausliiga season, Westö joined HJK's first eleven. His performances during the season were promising, and he was considered a good prospect for the future.

On 10 November 2010, Westö announced that he was going to have a year off from professional football, citing personal reasons and ongoing philosophy studies.

Westö is the son of the author Mårten Westö. His uncle, Kjell Westö, is also a well known Finnish novelist.

== Honours ==
- Veikkausliiga: 2009, 2010
