= Daniel Osinachi Egwim =

Nigerian footballer

Personal information
- Date of birth: 25 August 1989 (age 37)
- Height: 1.80 m (5 ft 11 in)
- Position: Forward

Team information
- Current team: FC Inter Turku
- Number: 8

Youth career
- Sunshine Babes

Senior career*
Years	Team	Apps	(Gls)
- Sunshine F.C.
2010–2014	FC Inter Turku	20	(0)
- * Club domestic league appearances and goals

Daniel Osinachi Egwim (born 25 August 1989) is a Nigerian former footballer.
