= Norrvalla Fotbollsförening =

Finnish football club

Norrvalla Fotbollförening
- Full name: Norrvalla Fotbollförening
- Nickname(s): Norrvalla FF
- Founded: 1996
- Ground: Vörå Centralplan, Vörå, Finland
- Chairman: Andreas Gammelgård
- Coach: Yankuba Ceesay
- League: Kolmonen
Home colours

Norrvalla Fotbollförening (abbreviated Norrvalla FF) is a football club from Vörå, Finland. The club was formed in 1996 and their home ground is at the Vörå Centralplan.

== Background ==
Norrvalla Fotbollförening was founded in 1996 after several meetings between representatives from the Vörå IF, Oravais IF, Maxmo Sportklubb and Hellnäs Bollklubb clubs. The idea was to create an organisation specializing in football.

The formal decision to found the club was finally made at a meeting held on 24 November 1996. A business plan was approved with the following objectives for 1997:

– To achieve an efficient organization
– To create their own identity so that all might know: "This is my football club"
– To create a working relationship with the parent clubs
– To create a sustainable economy for the new club
– On a sporting basis to create a solid platform to stand on for the coming year

Over the years the club has achieved these initial goals although many challenges remain. Norrvalla FF has its base at the Norrvalla Folkhälsans Rehabilitation Centre, where the bulk of training takes place, especially during winter, spring and autumn. Matches are played on artificial turf.

In their early years Norrvalla FF played in the lower levels of Finnish football. They played 3 seasons in the third tier, the Kakkonen (Second Division), in 2007 to 2009. However the 2009 season ended in disappointment when they were relegated back to the Kolmonen (Third Division).

== Season to season ==
Season	Level	Division	Section	Administration	Position	Movements
2000	Tier 5	Nelonen (Fourth Division)	Vaasa	Vaasa District (SPL Vaasa)	8th	
2001	Tier 5	Nelonen (Fourth Division)	Vaasa	Vaasa District (SPL Vaasa)	3rd	Promoted
2002	Tier 4	Kolmonen (Third Division)	Vaasa	Vaasa District (SPL Vaasa)	6th	
2003	Tier 4	Kolmonen (Third Division)		Vaasa District (SPL Vaasa)	Prelim. – 3rd	Upper Section -3rd – Play-offs
2004	Tier 4	Kolmonen (Third Division)		Vaasa District (SPL Vaasa)	Prelim. – 1st	Upper Section -7th
2005	Tier 4	Kolmonen (Third Division)		Vaasa District (SPL Vaasa)	Prelim. – 2nd	Upper Section -1st – Play-offs
2006	Tier 4	Kolmonen (Third Division)		Vaasa District (SPL Vaasa)	Prelim. – 3rd	Upper Section -3rd – Play-offs – Promoted
2007	Tier 3	Kakkonen (Second Division)	Group C	Finnish FA (Suomen Pallolitto)	8th	
2008	Tier 3	Kakkonen (Second Division)	Group C	Finnish FA (Suomen Pallolitto)	4th	
2009	Tier 3	Kakkonen (Second Division)	Group C	Finnish FA (Suomen Pallolitto)	13th	Relegated
2010	Tier 4	Kolmonen (Third Division)	Central Ostrobothnia and Vaasa	Vaasa District (SPL Vaasa)	7th	
2011	Tier 4	Kolmonen (Third Division)	Central Ostrobothnia and Vaasa	Vaasa District (SPL Vaasa)	6th	
2012	Tier 4	Kolmonen (Third Division)	Central Ostrobothnia and Vaasa	Vaasa District (SPL Vaasa)	6th	
2013	Tier 4	Kolmonen (Third Division)	Central Ostrobothnia and Vaasa	Vaasa District (SPL Vaasa)	7th	
2014	Tier 4	Kolmonen (Third Division)	Central Ostrobothnia and Vaasa	Vaasa District (SPL Vaasa)	9th	
2015	Tier 4	Kolmonen (Third Division)	Central Ostrobothnia and Vaasa	Vaasa District (SPL Vaasa)	2nd	
2016	Tier 4	Kolmonen (Third Division)	Central Ostrobothnia and Vaasa	Vaasa District (SPL Vaasa)	13th	Relegated
2017	Tier 5	Nelonen (Fourth Division)	Vaasa	Vaasa District (SPL Vaasa)	2nd	
2018	Tier 5	Nelonen (Fourth Division)	Vaasa	Vaasa District (SPL Vaasa)	4th	
2019	Tier 5	Nelonen (Fourth Division)	Vaasa	Vaasa District (SPL Vaasa)	1st	Promoted
2020	Tier 4	Kolmonen (Third Division)	Central Ostrobothnia and Vaasa	Vaasa District (SPL Vaasa)		

- 3 seasons in Kakkonen
- 13 seasons in Kolmonen
- 5 seasons in Nelonen

== Club structure ==
Norrvalla Fotbollförening run a number of teams including adult teams and a number of junior teams for boys and girls.

== Famous players ==
Former Finland national football team captain Tim Sparv played for the club during his youth, in a team that had four players in the youth national team.
