= Masalan Kisa =

Finnish sports club

- Full name: Masalan Kisa
- Nickname: MasKi
- Founded: 1963
- League: []
- Home ground: Främnäsin kenttä, Masala, Kirkkonummi, Finland

Masalan Kisa (abbreviated MasKi) is a sports club from Masala in Kirkkonummi, Finland. The club was formed in 1963 and covers the sports of badminton, gymnastics, basketball, volleyball and beach volleyball. MasKi also make provision for aerobics and other dance fitness classes. In addition the club organises various sports and recreation events. The club has in excess of 500 members. There are groups for children, youth, adults and families.

== Football ==
MasKi was one of three football clubs in Kirkkonummi. The other clubs are Kyrkslätt Idrottsförening and Veikkolan Veikot. In addition there is the women's football club known as AC Kirkkonummi. When the clubs merged in 2019, a new football club, FC Kirkkonummi, was founded.

MasKi runs two men's football teams, two veteran teams and a futsal team. In addition there is an active junior section catering for a large number of age groups. Teams practice 2–3 times a week. In the winter training is centred in school halls and the Blue Arena indoor hall. Training takes place mainly in summer at the Masala and Luoma sports fields. A number of teams participate in tournaments at home and abroad.

The MasKi men's first team play their home matches at the Kirkkonummen urheilupuisto. In 2009 season they finished runners-up in Section 1 (Lohko 1) of the Nelonen administered by the Uusimaa SPL and were promoted to the Kolmonen.

== Season to season ==
Season	Level	Division	Section	Administration	Position	Movements
2001	Tier 7	Kutonen (Sixth Division)	Section 1	Uusimaa District (SPL Uusimaa)	2nd	
2002	Tier 7	Kutonen (Sixth Division)	Section 2	Uusimaa District (SPL Uusimaa)	2nd	Promoted
2003	Tier 6	Vitonen (Fifth Division)	Section 3	Uusimaa District (SPL Uusimaa)	5th	
2004	Tier 6	Vitonen (Fifth Division)	Section 1	Uusimaa District (SPL Uusimaa)	5th	
2005	Tier 6	Vitonen (Fifth Division)	Section 1	Uusimaa District (SPL Uusimaa)	2nd	Promoted
2006	Tier 5	Nelonen (Fourth Division)	Section 1	Uusimaa District (SPL Uusimaa)	6th	
2007	Tier 5	Nelonen (Fourth Division)	Section 1	Uusimaa District (SPL Uusimaa)	7th	
2008	Tier 5	Nelonen (Fourth Division)	Section 1	Uusimaa District (SPL Uusimaa)	9th	
2009	Tier 5	Nelonen (Fourth Division)	Section 1	Uusimaa District (SPL Uusimaa)	2nd	Promoted
2010	Tier 4	Kolmonen (Third Division)	Section 1	Helsinki & Uusimaa (SPL Uusimaa)	12th	Relegated

- 1 season in Kolmonen
- 4 seasons in Nelonen
- 3 seasons in Vitonen
- 2 seasons in Kutonen

== 2010 season ==
For the current season MasKi are competing in Section 1 (Lohko 1) of the Kolmonen administered by the Helsinki SPL and Uusimaa SPL. This is the fourth highest tier in the Finnish football system.

MasKi 2 are participating in Section 1 (Lohko 1) of the Kutonen administered by the Uusimaa SPL.
