= Pallo-Kerho 37 =

Finnish football club

PK-37 Iisalmi
- Full name: Pallo-Kerho 37
- Nickname(s): PK
- Founded: 1937; 88 years ago
- Ground: Sankariniemi; Iisalmi; Finland
- Capacity: 5,000
- Chairman: Mikko Aminoff
- Head Coach: Mika Lähderinne
- Coach: Mika Pesonen (Finland) Lasse Vornanen (Finland) Veli Junnilainen (GK)
- League: Kolmonen
- 2009: 11th – Kakkonen (Group C)
| Home colours | Away colours |

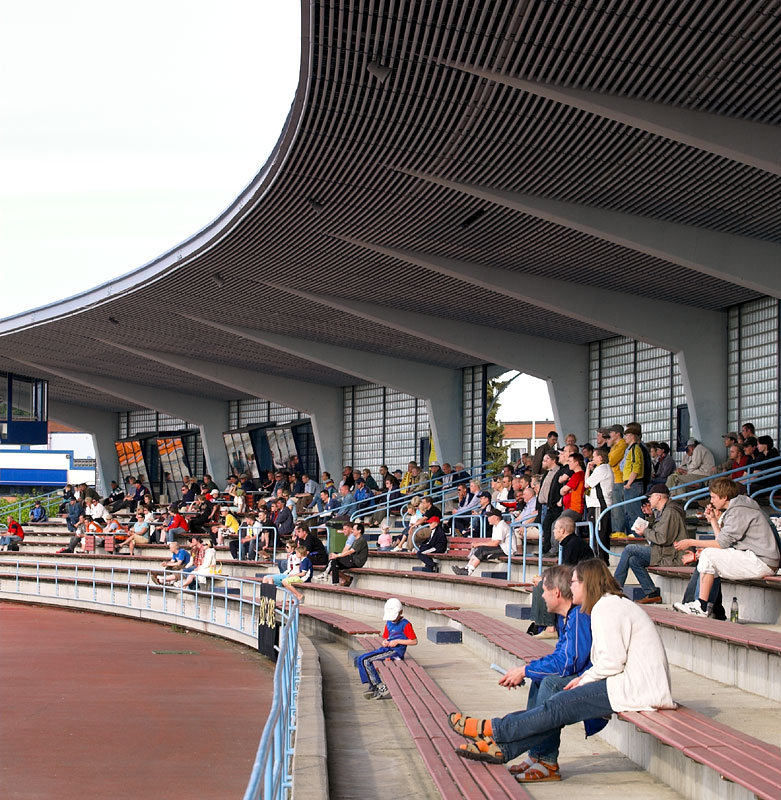
Sankariniemen stadion

Pallo-Kerho 37, also known as PK-37, is a Finnish football club from the city of Iisalmi. The club was founded on 10 October 1937 as a bandy and football club, but later on it also became known for its pesäpallo and ice hockey sections. Nowadays PK-37 concentrates only on football.

The club's men's team play at the third highest level of Finnish football, in the Kakkonen. The Club chairman is Mikko Aminoff and the team is managed by Marko 'Pessi' Pesonen. The previous coach was Atik Ismail who has now moved to Jämsänkosken Ilves.

== Background ==
PK-37 have played 8 seasons in the Ykkönen (First Division) or its predecessor the Suomensarja (Finland League), the second tier of Finnish football, in the periods 1964, 1971, 1986 and 1989–93.

They also have had six spells in the third tier, the Kakkonen (Second Division), covering 25 seasons from 1973 to 1979, 1983–85, 1987–88, 1994–2000, 2002–04 and 2008 to the present day.

The club has gained a good reputation for developing junior players. Young players are transferred to larger clubs in the transition to work or study in other locations.

== Club structure ==
PK-37 runs 2 men's teams along with 10 boys teams in a vibrant junior section.

== 2010 season ==
PK-37 Men's Team are competing in Group C (Lohko C) of the Kakkonen administered by the Football Association of Finland (Suomen Palloliitto) . This is the third highest tier in the Finnish football system. In 2009 the team finished in eleventh position in their Kakkonen section.

PK-37 / 2 are participating in Section B (Lohko B) of the Nelonen administered by the Itä-Suomi SPL.

== References and sources ==
- Official Website
- Finnish Wikipedia
- Suomen cup
