= Forssan Jalkapalloklubi =

Finnish football club

- Full name: Forssan Jalkapalloklubi
- Nickname(s): FJK
- Founded: 1997; 28 years ago
- Ground: Lamminrannan urheilukenttä, Forssa, Finland
- Coach: Joona Murtolahti
- League: Kolmonen
Home colours

Forssan Jalkapalloklubi (abbreviated FJK) is a football club from Forssa, Finland. The club was formed in 1997 and their home ground is at the Lamminrannan urheilukenttä. The men's first team currently plays in the Kolmonen (Third Division).

== Background ==
FJK was established in 1997 following the merger of the Forssan A-futis and Pallotiimi Forssa clubs. There was a lot of preparation in getting to this stage since the concept was first mooted in October 1994. The founding meeting was held on 30 January 1997 and was attended by Pertti Aalto, Ismo Suontausta, Tarmo Laajalehto, Ari Turtola, Tapio Virtanen, Kari Perkiö, Veikko Haavisto, Pauli Miettinen, Jari Rosenberg, Heikki Jokikunnas and Harri Hemming.

Following their early years in the Kolmonen (Third Division), the club have spent four seasons in the third tier of Finnish football, the Kakkonen (Second Division) in 2002–04 and 2008.

The last decade has been a rollercoaster with the highlight being the 2004 season when the club finished top of the West Group of the Kakkonen (Second Division) only to fail in the play-offs in gaining promotion to the Ykkönen (First Division).

The club over-stretched themselves and withdrew from the Kakkonen for 2005 before starting again in the Nelonen (Fourth Division) in 2006. With back to back promotions FJK achieved their former status in the Kakkonen for 2008. This time they were less successful in the third tier and quickly slipped back into the Kolmonen (Third Division) where the club currently reside.

== Season to season ==
Season	Level	Division	Section	Administration	Position	Movements
2001	Tier 4	Kolmonen (Third Division)		Tampere District (SPL Tampere)	2nd	Promoted
2002	Tier 3	Kakkonen (Second Division)	South Group	Finnish FA (Suomen Pallolitto)	8th	
2003	Tier 3	Kakkonen (Second Division)	West Group	Finnish FA (Suomen Pallolitto)	6th	
2004	Tier 3	Kakkonen (Second Division)	West Group	Finnish FA (Suomen Pallolitto)	1st	Play-offs
2005		Withdrew from Kakkonen				
2006	Tier 5	Nelonen (Fourth Division)	South Section	Tampere District (SPL Tampere)	1st	Promoted
2007	Tier 4	Kolmonen (Third Division)		Tampere District (SPL Tampere)	1st	Promoted
2008	Tier 3	Kakkonen (Second Division)	Group B	Finnish FA (Suomen Pallolitto)	14th	Relegated
2009	Tier 4	Kolmonen (Third Division)		Tampere District (SPL Tampere)	6th	
2010	Tier 4	Kolmonen (Third Division)		Tampere District (SPL Tampere)		

- 4 season in Kakkonen
- 4 seasons in Kolmonen
- 1 season in Nelonen

== Club Structure ==
Forssan Jalkapalloklubi run a number of teams including 2 men's teams, 1 ladies team, 2 men's veterans teams (Pampa Boys), 8 boys teams and 4 girls teams. In total the club has a total of more than 500 registered players and serves the Forssa, Tammela, Jokioinen, and Humppila and Ypäjä areas.

== 2010 season ==
FJK Men's Team are competing in the Kolmonen (Third Division) section administered by the Tampere SPL. This is the fourth highest tier in the Finnish football system.

FJK /2 participated in Section 1 of the Vitonen (Fifth Division) administered by the Tampere SPL in the 2009 season. They have not entered a side for the 2010 campaign following relegation.
