= Orimattilan Pedot =

Finnish sports club

- Full name: Orimattilan Pedot
- Nicknames: OPedot, Pedot
- Founded: 1967
- Ground: Orimattilan keskuskenttä 100m x 65m Orimattila, Finland
- Capacity: 900
- Chairman: Petri Marjamäki
- Coach: Toni Sundholm (Finland)
- League: Vitonen
Home colours	Away colours

Orimattilan Pedot (abbreviated OPedot) is a sports club from Orimattila, Finland specialising in football and ice-hockey. The club was formed in 1967 and its main home ground is at the Orimattilan keskuskenttä. They also use Orimattila Areena tekonurmi, officially Opintie Tekonurmi

== Background ==
Orimattilan Pedot was originally established in 1967 as an ice-hockey club. However, in recent years football has become the undisputed number one club sport with its low start-up costs.

A very important facility for the club is the Petoluola (Football Hall) which was opened in March 2008 as an indoor training space for the football club. No longer is it necessary to train or play on snow, ice or a wooden floor. The playing surface is FIFA-approved artificial turf.

The Orimattilan Pedot club recognises that team sports experiences and activities are important for the development of children, suggesting that shared moments of both joy and disappointment are important lessons that stick with them through life. The club may also be able to set a sound foundation for good quality of life and a sporty lifestyle.

The club has spent many seasons in the lower divisions of the Finnish football league. In 2024 Season OPedot played in Vitonen (Finnish 7th highest division). Opedot will be playing in Vitonen again for 2025 season.

== Season to season ==
Season	Level	Division	Section	Administration	Position	Movements
1998	Tier 6	Vitonen (Fifth Division)	Section 4	Uusimaa District (SPL Uusimaa)	4th	
1999	Tier 6	Vitonen (Fifth Division)	Section 4	Uusimaa District (SPL Uusimaa)	3rd	
2000	Tier 6	Vitonen (Fifth Division)	Section 4	Uusimaa District (SPL Uusimaa)	2nd	Promoted
2001	Tier 5	Nelonen (Fourth Division)	Section 4	Uusimaa District (SPL Uusimaa)	9th	
2002	Tier 5	Nelonen (Fourth Division)	Section 2	Uusimaa District (SPL Uusimaa)	4th	
2003	Tier 5	Nelonen (Fourth Division)	Section 2	Uusimaa District (SPL Uusimaa)	6th	
2004	Tier 5	Nelonen (Fourth Division)	Section 2	Uusimaa District (SPL Uusimaa)	4th	
2005	Tier 5	Nelonen (Fourth Division)	Section 2	Uusimaa District (SPL Uusimaa)	8th	
2006	Tier 5	Nelonen (Fourth Division)	Section 2	Uusimaa District (SPL Uusimaa)	6th	
2007	Tier 5	Nelonen (Fourth Division)	Section 2	Uusimaa District (SPL Uusimaa)	2nd	Promoted
2008	Tier 4	Kolmonen (Third Division)	Section 3	Helsinki & Uusimaa (SPL Helsinki)	8th	
2009	Tier 4	Kolmonen (Third Division)	Section 3	Helsinki & Uusimaa (SPL Uusimaa)	9th	
2010	Tier 4	Kolmonen (Third Division)	Section 3	Helsinki & Uusimaa (SPL Uusimaa)	11th	Relegated
2011	Tier 5	Nelonen (Fourth Division)	Section 2	Uusimaa District (SPL Uusimaa)	5th	
2012	Tier 5	Nelonen (Fourth Division)	Section 2	Uusimaa District (SPL Uusimaa)	2nd	
2013	Tier 5	Nelonen (Fourth Division)	Section 2	Uusimaa District (SPL Uusimaa)	4th	
2014	Tier 5	Nelonen (Fourth Division)	Section 2	Uusimaa District (SPL Uusimaa)	4th	
2015	Tier 5	Nelonen (Fourth Division)	Section 2	Uusimaa District (SPL Uusimaa)	8th	
2016	Tier 4	Nelonen (Third Division)	Section 2	Uusimaa (SPL Uusimaa)	12th	Relegated
2017	Tier 5	Vitonen (Fifth Division)	Section 4	Uusimaa District (SPL Uusimaa)	3rd	

Since 1998

- 3 seasons in Kolmonen
- 13 seasons in Nelonen
- 4 seasons in Vitonen

== Club Structure ==
Orimattilan Pedot run a large number of teams including 1 men's team, 1 ladies team, 2 veteran's teams, 8 boys teams and 1 girls teams. The club now has more than 200 pre-school and primary school age girls and boys who enjoy activities such as the club's Säästöpankkiliiga.

== Men’s team 2025 ==
Mäki-Latikka Ville

Matikainen Jimi

Kuosa Petri

Raja Aaku

Mustonen Roni

Phan Minh Na Uy

Sundholm Toni

Vartiainen Sampo

Kinni Miki

Lehtonen Oskari

Perttunen Antti

Sundholm Rufus

Hakanen Jani

Moilanen Joona

Matikainen Daniel

Teittinen Benjamin

Saarinen Niklas

Arcos Cardona Jonathan

Mustonen Noel

Ali Rabar

Arcos San Martin Jonathan

Bautista Caules Alejandro

Hyppönen Jukka

Nevalainen Mikko

Raunio Jussi

Westman Vilho

== Juonior Teams ==
Boys 2008 P17 Nelonen

Boys 2010 P15 Kolmonen

Boys 2011 P14 Kolmonen

Boys 2012/Vihreä P13 Vitonen

Boys 2012/Musta P13 Kutonen

Boys 2013 P12 Vitonen

Girls 2012 T13 Kolmonen

== 2014 season ==
http://www.resultcode.fi/sarjat/sarja_sarjatilanne_ja_ottelut_nayta.php?sarja_id=108048&piiri_id=100005

== Sources ==
- Official First Team Website
- Official Website
- Suomen Cup
- Orimattilan Pedot Facebook
