= SexyPöxyt =

- Nickname: Pöxyt
- Founded: 1985
- Ground: Laaksolahden urheilupuisto, Espoo, Finland
- Chairman: Ville Niemioja
- Manager: Markku Palmroos
- League: Kolmonen
Home colours	Away colours

SexyPöxyt (English: "Sexy Pants") is a football club from Laaksolahti in Espoo, Finland. The club was formed in 1985 and currently plays in the Kakkonen, the fourth level of Finnish football, with their home ground based at the Laaksolahden urheilupuisto (Laaksolahti Sports Park). The club chairman in 2012 is Pekka Huhta and the former chairmen are Lauri Walden, Jarkko Koskela, Jussi Vyyryläinen, Arto Nummivaara, Riku Auvinen, Petri Godenhjelm, and Timo Walden.

== Background ==
According to its own description the club has become known for their home-made brown shirts in their early days and "spirit of the pants" which means confidence of the young players both in themselves and in their mates.

The club run a second team known as SuxiBoxit who a few years ago played in the Vitonen but now compete in the Over 35 age group. The team's home venue is at Karakallion Hornankattila (also known as Karakallion koulun kenttä).

== Season to season ==
Season	Level	Division	Section	Administration	Position	Movements
1999	Tier 5	Nelonen (Fourth Division)	Group 1	Uusimaa District (SPL Uusimaa)	1st	Promoted
2000	Tier 4	Kolmonen (Third Division)	Section 2	Helsinki & Uusimaa (SPL Uusimaa)	6th	
2001	Tier 4	Kolmonen (Third Division)	Section 2	Helsinki & Uusimaa (SPL Uusimaa)	6th	
2002	Tier 4	Kolmonen (Third Division)	Section 2	Helsinki & Uusimaa (SPL Uusimaa)	8th	
2003	Tier 4	Kolmonen (Third Division)	Section 1	Helsinki & Uusimaa (SPL Uusimaa)	8th	
2004	Tier 4	Kolmonen (Third Division)	Section 1	Helsinki & Uusimaa (SPL Uusimaa)	8th	
2005	Tier 4	Kolmonen (Third Division)	Section 1	Helsinki & Uusimaa (SPL Uusimaa)	8th	
2006	Tier 4	Kolmonen (Third Division)	Section 1	Helsinki & Uusimaa (SPL Uusimaa)	2nd	
2007	Tier 4	Kolmonen (Third Division)	Section 1	Helsinki & Uusimaa (SPL Uusimaa)	6th	
2008	Tier 4	Kolmonen (Third Division)	Section 2	Helsinki & Uusimaa (SPL Uusimaa)	9th	
2009	Tier 4	Kolmonen (Third Division)	Section 2	Helsinki & Uusimaa (SPL Helsinki)	3rd	
2010	Tier 4	Kolmonen (Third Division)	Section 1	Helsinki & Uusimaa (SPL Uusimaa)	9th	
2011	Tier 4	Kolmonen (Third Division)	Section 1	Helsinki & Uusimaa (SPL Uusimaa)	4th	
2012	Tier 4	Kolmonen (Third Division)	Section 2	Helsinki & Uusimaa (SPL Helsinki)	2nd	
2013	Tier 4	Kolmonen (Third Division)	Section 2	Helsinki & Uusimaa (SPL Helsinki)	3rd	
2014	Tier 4	Kolmonen (Third Division)	Section 2	Helsinki & Uusimaa (SPL Helsinki)	4th	
2015	Tier 4	Kolmonen (Third Division)	Section 1	Helsinki & Uusimaa (SPL Helsinki)	3rd	
2016	Tier 4	Kolmonen (Third Division)	Section 2	Helsinki & Uusimaa (SPL Helsinki)	3rd	
2017	Tier 4	Kolmonen (Third Division)	Section 2	Helsinki & Uusimaa (SPL Helsinki)	9th	
2018	Tier 4	Kolmonen (Third Division)	Section 1	Helsinki & Uusimaa (SPL Helsinki)	4th	
2019	Tier 4	Kolmonen (Third Division)	Section 1	Helsinki & Uusimaa (SPL Helsinki)	7th	
2020	Tier 4	Kolmonen (Third Division)	Section A	South (SPL Etelä)	3rd	
2021	Tier 4	Kolmonen (Third Division)	Section A Upper	South (SPL Etelä)	3rd	
2022	Tier 4	Kolmonen (Third Division)	Section A	South (SPL Etelä)	2nd	Promoted
2023	Tier 3	Kakkonen	Group B	Finnish FA (Suomen Pallolitto)	11th	Relegated

- 13 consecutive seasons in Kolmonen

== 2010 season ==
For the 2010 season SexyPöxyt were competing in Section 1 (Lohko 1) of the Kolmonen administered by the Helsinki SPL and Uusimaa SPL. This was the fourth highest tier in the Finnish football system. It was a significant season for the club as they were celebrating their 25th anniversary.

After promotion to the Second Division in 2011, SexyPöxyt had been forced to change their name to the tamer Pöxyt, so as not to fall foul of league rules restricting frivolous names at higher levels.

== Sources ==
- Club Website
- Finnish Wikipedia
- Suomen Cup
- SexyPöxyt Facebook
