= Jämsänkosken Ilves =

Finnish sports club

- Full name: Jämsänkosken Ilves
- Nickname(s): JIlves
- Founded: 1930
- Ground: Jämsänkosken Pallokenttä, Jämsä, Finland
- Chairman: Keijo Pitkäniemi
- Manager: Atik Ismail
- Coach: Jari Puronaho (Finland) Small Juha Mäki
- League: Kolmonen
- Website: https://www.jamsankoskenilves.fi/
Home colours

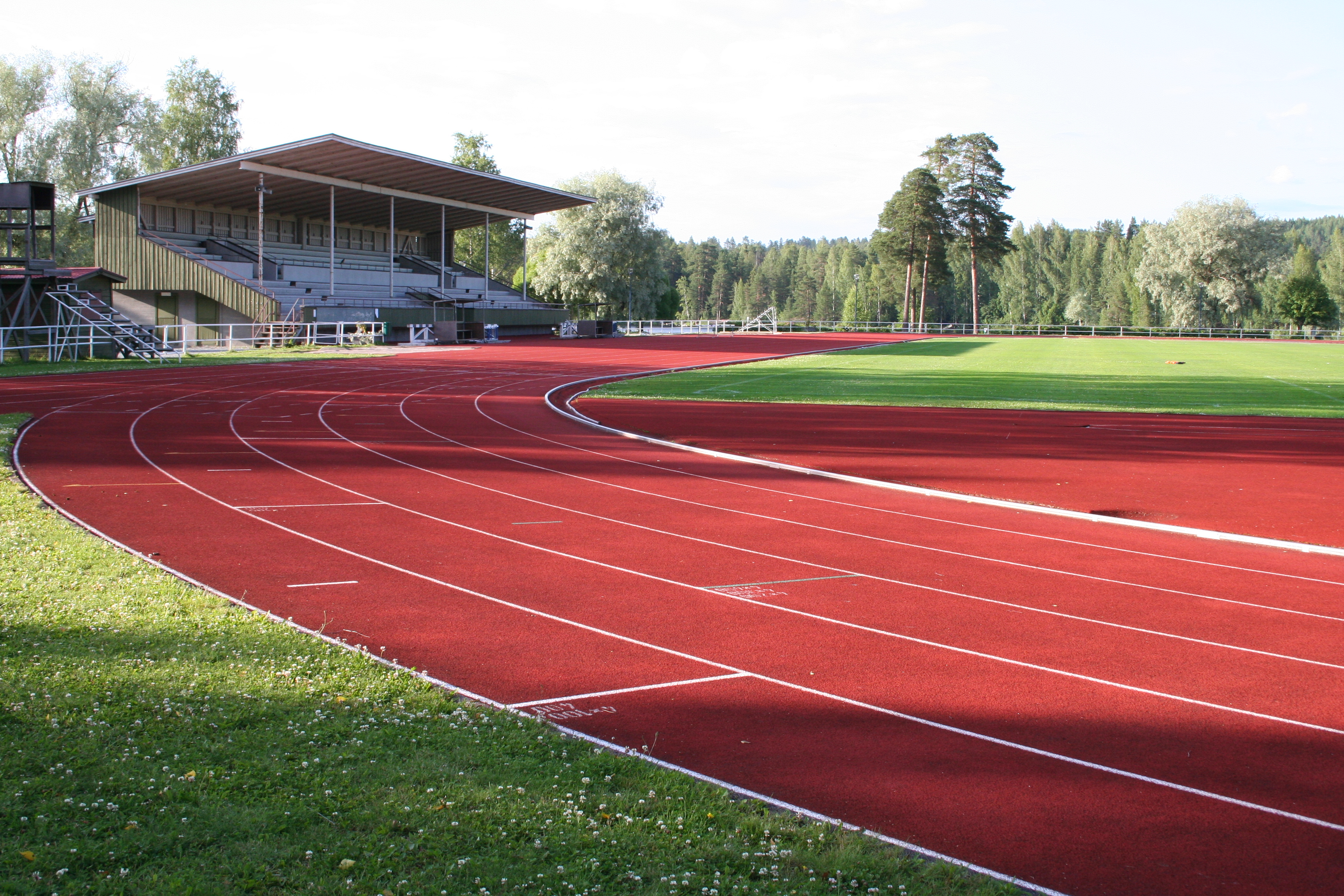
Oinaalan urheilukenttä

Jämsänkosken Ilves (abbreviated JIlves) is a sports club from Jämsä, Finland. The club is active in cross-country skiing, swimming, athletics, and football, where it has a long tradition. The club's home ground is at the Jämsänkosken Pallokenttä. Other venues used by the club include the Oinaalan urheilukenttä (Oinaala sports field), Paunu and Jaatilan kenttä at Jämsä.

== Background ==
The club was formed on 2 May 1930 when 30 sports minded people met at the club of the local paper mill, Yhtyneet Paperitehtaat Oy, to revive Jämsänkosken VPK's gymnastics and sports clubs. The year 2010 is the eightieth anniversary of the club and a number of celebratory events are being held.

JIlves played 8 seasons in the second tier of Finnish football from 1963 until 1970. They also have had 5 spells in the third tier (the Second Division) in 1974–76, 1978, 1981–83, 1985, 1990.

In the late 1980s the club found itself in the Fourth Division but a merger with Jämsän Pallo enabled the club to return to the Second Division for a short-lived spell in 1990. Over the last decade JIlves has played in the Kolmonen (Third Division)

== Season to season ==
Season	Level	Division	Section	Administration	Position	Movements
2003	Tier 4	Kolmonen (Third Division)		Central Finland (SPL Keski-Suomi)	2nd	
2004	Tier 4	Kolmonen (Third Division)		Central Finland (SPL Keski-Suomi)	3rd	
2005	Tier 4	Kolmonen (Third Division)		Central Finland (SPL Keski-Suomi)	2nd	
2006	Tier 4	Kolmonen (Third Division)		Central Finland (SPL Keski-Suomi)	3rd	
2007	Tier 4	Kolmonen (Third Division)		Central Finland (SPL Keski-Suomi)	3rd	
2008	Tier 4	Kolmonen (Third Division)		Central Finland (SPL Keski-Suomi)	5th	
2009	Tier 4	Kolmonen (Third Division)		Central & Eastern Finland (SPL Keski-Suomi)	7th	
2010	Tier 4	Kolmonen (Third Division)		Central & Eastern Finland (SPL Keski-Suomi)		

- 8 seasons in Kolmonen

== Club structure ==
Jämsänkosken Ilves runs a large number of teams including 2 men's teams, 1 veteran's team, 1 ladies team, 10 boys teams and 2 girls teams. The club has recently appointed Atik Ismail, the former Finnish international, as head coach who has been making some significant changes to the coaching provision at the club.

== 2010 season ==
JIlves First Team are competing in the Kolmonen administered by the Itä-Suomi SPL and Keski-Suomi SPL. This is the fourth highest tier in the Finnish football system. In 2009 JIlves finished in seventh place in the Kolmonen.

JIlves/2 are participating in the Vitonen section administered by the Keski-Suomi SPL.

== References and sources ==
- Official Club Website
- Official Football Website
- Finnish Wikipedia
- Suomen Cup
- Jämsänkosken Ilves Facebook
