= AC Vantaa =

Finnish football club

Airport City Vantaa
- Full name: Jalkapalloseura Airport City
- Nickname(s): AC Vantaa
- Founded: 1998; 27 years ago
- Dissolved: 2013
- Ground: ISS Stadion, Myyrmäki, Vantaa; Finland
- Chairman: Pasi Kujala
- Head Coach: Pasi Kujala
Home colours

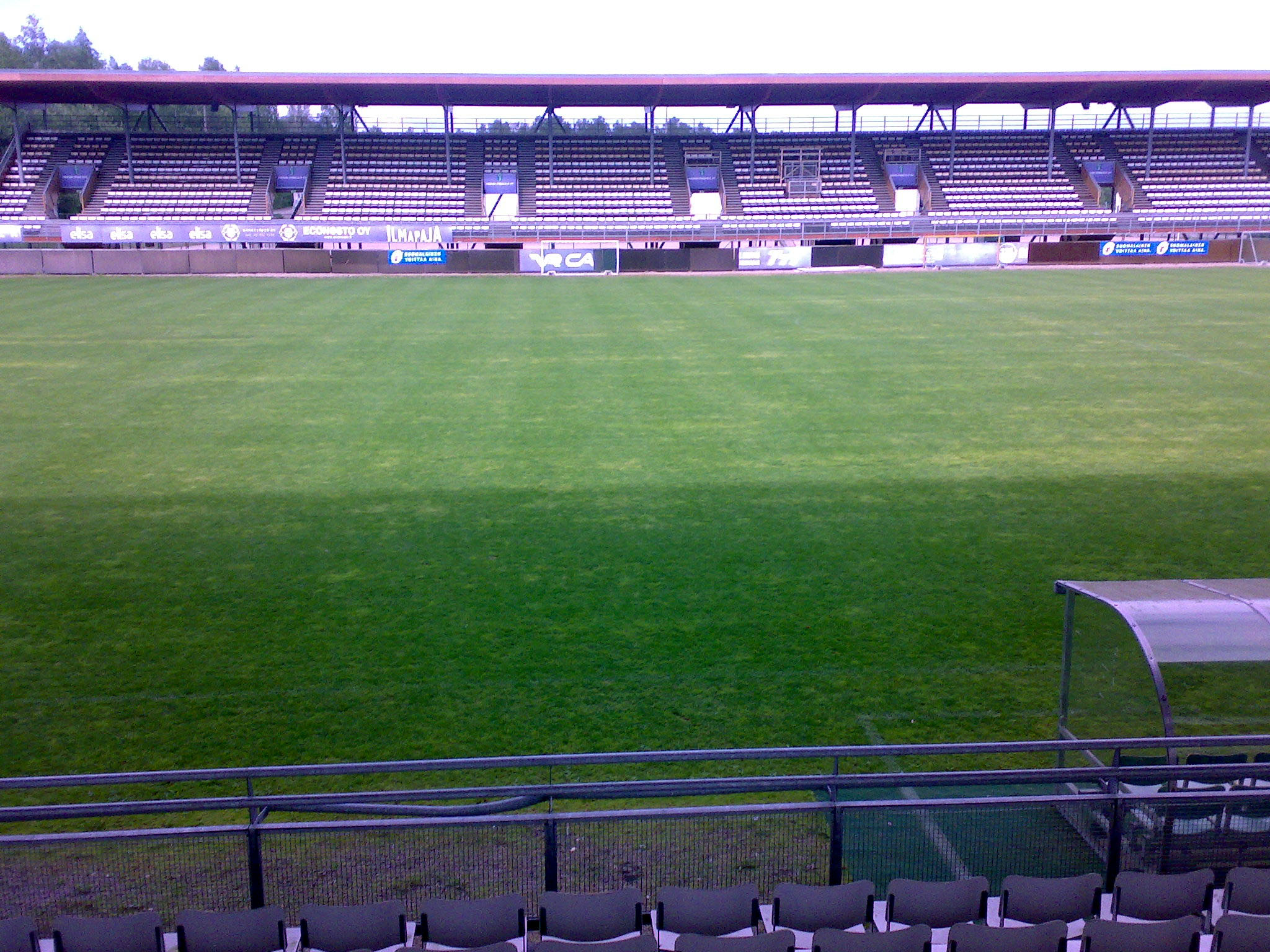
ISS Stadion

Jalkapalloseura Airport City (abbreviated AC Vantaa) was a football club from Vantaa in Finland. The club was formed in 1998 and their home ground was at ISS Stadion in Myyrmäki, Vantaa.

== Background ==
The club was founded in 1998 as a flagship club for Vantaa following the merger of Tikkurilan Palloseura and Vantaan Jalkapalloseura men's first teams with assistance from Koivukylän Palloseura, Pallokerho-50 and Itä-Vantaan Urheilijat clubs.

AC Vantaa played two seasons in the Ykkönen (First Division), the second tier of Finnish football in 1999 and 2001. They also have had three spells in the third tier, the Kakkonen (Second Division), in 2000, 2002–03 and now again in 2010.

In 2003 the club were relegated to the Kolmonen (Third Division) and were in danger of folding but were re-energised by a new Committee whose hard work was eventually rewarded by promotion back to the Kakkonen at the end of the 2009 season as champions of Section 2 of the Kolmonen.

In 2013, AC Vantaa was dissolved and merged with another local club Team Vanpa.

== Season to season ==
| Season | Level | Division | Section | Administration | Position | Movements |
|---|---|---|---|---|---|---|
| 1999 | Tier 2 | Ykkönen (First Division) | South Group | Finnish FA (Suomen Pallolitto) | 9th | Relegation Group – Relegated |
| 2000 | Tier 3 | Kakkonen (Second Division) | South Group | Finnish FA (Suomen Pallolitto) | 2nd | Play-offs – Promoted |
| 2001 | Tier 2 | Ykkönen (First Division) | South Group | Finnish FA (Suomen Pallolitto) | 9th | Relegated |
| 2002 | Tier 3 | Kakkonen (Second Division) | South Group | Finnish FA (Suomen Pallolitto) | 2nd | |
| 2003 | Tier 3 | Kakkonen (Second Division) | South Group | Finnish FA (Suomen Pallolitto) | 11th | Relegated |
| 2004 | Tier 4 | Kolmonen (Third Division) | Section 3 | Helsinki & Uusimaa (SPL Helsinki) | 8th | |
| 2005 | Tier 4 | Kolmonen (Third Division) | Section 3 | Helsinki & Uusimaa (SPL Helsinki) | 6th | |
| 2006 | Tier 4 | Kolmonen (Third Division) | Section 2 | Helsinki & Uusimaa (SPL Uusimaa) | 7th | |
| 2007 | Tier 4 | Kolmonen (Third Division) | Section 3 | Helsinki & Uusimaa (SPL Uusimaa) | 2nd | |
| 2008 | Tier 4 | Kolmonen (Third Division) | Section 3 | Helsinki & Uusimaa (SPL Helsinki) | 2nd | |
| 2009 | Tier 4 | Kolmonen (Third Division) | Section 2 | Helsinki & Uusimaa (SPL Helsinki) | 1st | Promoted |
| 2010 | Tier 3 | Kakkonen (Second Division) | Group A | Finnish FA (Suomen Pallolitto) | | |

- 2 seasons in Ykkönen
- 4 seasons in Kakkonen
- 6 seasons in Kolmonen

== Club structure ==
Jalkapalloseura Airport City ran a number of teams including 3 men's teams, 1 ladies team and 1 boys team.

== 2010 season ==
AC Vantaa Men's Team were competing in Group A (Lohko A) of the Kakkonen administered by the Football Association of Finland (Suomen Palloliitto). This is the third highest tier in the Finnish football system. In 2009 AC Vantaa finished in first position in Section 2 of the Kolmonen and were promoted to the Kakkonen.

AC Vantaa / 2 were participating in Section 3 (Lohko 3) of the Vitonen administered by the Uusimaa SPL.
