= Järvenpää (disambiguation) =

Järvenpää is a town and municipality in Finland.

Järvenpää may also refer to:

- Järvenpää (surname)
- Järvenpää, Lahti, a district
- Järvenpää Plus, a political party
