= 2026 Finnish Cup preliminary round =

The draw for the preliminary round (Finnish: Juuson Kierros, in honor of Juuso Walden) of the 2026 Finnish Cup was made on 29 January 2026 at 11:00 am (Finnish Time) on the Football Association of Finland's (Palloliito) YouTube channel. 242 teams participate in this round. They are divided into ten groups based on geography.

Number of teams per tier still in competition
Veikkausliiga (1)	Ykkösliiga (2)	Ykkönen (3)	Kakkonen (4)	Kolmonen (5)	Nelonen (6)	Vitonen (7)	Kutonen (8)	Seiska (9)	M35 (+35)	Total
12 / 12	9 / 9	10 / 10	25 / 25	91 / 91	88 / 88	100 / 100	65 / 65	12 / 12	3 / 3	415 / 415

== Group 1 (Capital region) ==
15 February 2026	SUMU (6)	3–0 w/o	FC Honka/3 (6)	Helsinki
20:00		Report		Stadium: Tali Halli TN; Attendance: 20; Referee: Tommi Berg

18 February 2026	Espoon Sonnit (8)	2-7	AFG united (7)	Espoo
19:00	Sipilä 61'; Kokko 67'	Report	Mohammadi 6', 19', 55'; Hashemi 9'; Heydari 24'; Ghasemi 44'; Abedy 86'	Stadium: Espoonlahti 2 TN; Attendance: 10; Referee: Danial Khaledi

21 February 2026	ToTe/united (7)	0-2	HJK/Kantsu (6)	Helsinki
17:00		Report	Suihko 65'; Karra 79'	Stadium: Töölö PK 3 TN; Attendance: 10; Referee: Antti Erola

22 February 2026	ToTe/Arabia (9)	0-25	KoiPS (6)	Helsinki
12:00		Report	Suleiman 2', 4', 13'; Kuusisto 5', 50', 73', 75'; Niemelä 9', 10', 11', 15', 48', 66', 79', 87'; (o.g.) 9', 15'; Veckman 13'; Miettinen 16'; Salovaara 62', 69', 72', 89'; Kokkonen 64'; Fotso Wabo 82'	Stadium: Töölö PK 1 TN; Attendance: 20; Referee: Mohamed Mahmoud Abdelgayed

22 February 2026	FC Kiffen/3 (6)	4-1	Pöxyt/M35 (+35)	Helsinki
12:00	Hradecky 41', 55', 86'; Kiviniemi 83'	Report	Warner 90+2'	Stadium: Töölö PK 3 TN; Attendance: 15; Referee: Fereidoun Mohammadi

22 February 2026	KeiKa (7)	2-0	Helsinki Stars (7)	Vantaa
18:00	Kolesnik 31', 45+3'	Report		Stadium: Myyrmäki-halli TN; Attendance: 100; Referee: Valery Japoum Tchetko

22 February 2026	KaPy (7)	3-4	MLHF (7)	Espoo
18:15	Kesete 44'; Viitaharju 53'; Jansson 82'	Report	Namo 28', 55', 80'; Eastwood 85'	Stadium: Espoonlahti 2 TN; Attendance: 50; Referee: Niklas Heikkonen

27 February 2026	FC Pehmeet ja Märät (7)	2-0	Pessoas Boas (7)	Helsinki
20:00	Mykkänen 66'; Pikkarainen 77'	Report		Stadium: Töölö PK 1 TN; Attendance: 0 Referee: Oskari Paakkunainen

27 February 2026	Kasiysi/3 (9)	0-7	PEP (6)	Espoo
20:15		Report	Mattila 2', 17', 58'; Hammar-Staf 24'; Tiilikainen 38'; Välimäki 80'; Reijola 86'	Stadium: Laaksolahti TN; Attendance: 200; Referee: Valtteri Ollila

1 March 2026	KasiNolla (8)	7-1	Tikka/2 (7)	Helsinki
10:00	Mäkikuutti 15', 30'; Viljami Puttonen 50', 57', 64', 72'; Valtteri Puttonen 78'	Report	Taipale 45+1'	Stadium: Töölö PK 1 TN; Attendance: 20; Referee: Oskari Paakkunainen

1 March 2026	TöTa/FC Mauskis (8)	2-6	FC FC (8)	Helsinki
10:00	Kokko 61', 80'	Report	Ahtola 9', 59', 70'; Gripenberg 23'; Londén 67', 73'	Stadium: Töölö PK 3 TN; Attendance: 0 Referee: Eetu Julin

1 March 2026	PPS/OS (8)	1-6	Pöxyt/TNT (6)	Vantaa
18:00	Ikonen 74'	Report	Koski 2'; Virta 7', 44', 80'; Lindfors 19'; Väätäinen 37'	Stadium: Jalkapallostadion TN; Attendance: 78; Referee: Niklas Heikkonen

1 March 2026	Tavastia (7)	2-2 (1-3 p)	IF Gnistan/3 (6)	Helsinki
21:00	Kela 46', 53'	Report	Valkonen 35'; Rantala 72'	Stadium: Oulunkylä 1 TN; Attendance: 35; Referee: Tom Lindberg
	Penalties
	Jeskanen (penalty missed); Pirttisalo (penalty missed); Malolo (penalty missed); Nironen (penalty scored)		(penalty scored) Rantala; (penalty scored) Luukkonen; (penalty missed) Ritari; (penalty scored) Spilling

6 March 2026	FC Pakila (9)	1-8	HePu (7)	Helsinki
20:00	Laurila 62'	Report	Venäläinen 1'; Sami Ekmark 8', 19'; Miika Ekmark 40', 58', 75'; Leinonen 45+2'; Männikkö 79'	Stadium: Töölö PK 1 TN; Attendance: 12; Referee: Seidou Balla

6 March 2026	AC StaSi (8)	0-2	PiTa/II (8)	Helsinki
20:00		Report	Misini 25'; Sigman 90+7'	Stadium: Töölö PK 3 TN; Attendance: 30; Referee: Niklas Heikkonen

6 March 2026	Kasiysi (6)	5-0	FC POHU/Simpsons (7)	Espoo
20:05	Asikainen 19'; Westermarck 24', 64'; Bejtullahi 40'; Suominen 77'	Report		Stadium: Laaksolahti TN; Attendance: 20; Referee: Martin Koukka

7 March 2026	Helsingin Pallo-Veikot (8)	1-4	FC Eagles (6)	Helsinki
12:00	Heikkilä 51'	Report	Krasniqi 38', 48', 58'; Peci 68'	Stadium: Töölö PK 1 TN; Attendance: 30; Referee: Sebastian Nyberg

7 March 2026	Ponnistus/Peruskallio (8)	1-11	FC Korso/United (7)	Helsinki
16:30	Rosenström 40'	Report	Planting 9'; Kauppala 27', 44'; Salonen 32', 36', 51'; Lappalainen 39'; Lindgren 63'; Shabani 65'; Takki 71', 86'	Stadium: Töölö PK 1 TN; Attendance: 5 Referee: James Clay

7 March 2026	Valtti/4 (9)	0-4	FC Germania/Akademie (8)	Helsinki
18:00		Report	Hugl 15'; Schmitz 45'; Aulbach 72'; Lehtinen 75'	Stadium: Hartwall Sport Areena TN; Attendance: 15; Referee: Jasper Forget

7 March 2026	FC POHU/SiPa (7)	1-2	PK-35/2 (7)	Helsinki
19:00	Ahmed-Kassen 15'	Report	Inkinen 21'; Savola 41'	Stadium: Töölö PK 3 TN; Attendance: 50; Referee: Rasmus Rannanpää

8 March 2026	Kullervo/WT (8)	1-10	FC POHU/United (6)	Helsinki
12:00	Hacklin 67'	Report	Outila 15', 41', 65', 77', 79', 89'; Helle 27'; Kuisma 39'; Nieminen 56', 71'	Stadium: Töölö PK 3 TN; Attendance: 0 Referee: Daniel Saarela

8 March 2026	Gilla FC/26 (8)	3-0	PPV/Seos (8)	Helsinki
14:15	Keinaan 43'; Järvinen 82'; Strid 86'	Report		Stadium: Töölö PK 3 TN; Attendance: 80; Referee: Lirim Hajdini

8 March 2026	FC Kirkkonummi (7)	0-0 (2-4 p)	Jokerit FC (6)	Kirkkonummi
17:30		Report		Stadium: Urheilupuisto TN; Attendance: 150; Referee: Jesper Hakkila
	Penalties
	Elassal (penalty missed); Häkkinen (penalty scored); Kevari (penalty scored); Lagerträd (penalty missed)		(penalty scored) Tukiainen; (penalty scored) Pynnönen; (penalty scored) Tuovinen; (penalty scored) Pitkänen

8 March 2026	Kilo IF (7)	1-2	FC Dons (7)	Espoo
18:00	Ivonen 42'	Report	Kilpinen 55', 55'	Stadium: Keski-Espoo 2 TN; Attendance: 16; Referee: Niklas Heikkonen

== Group 2 (Capital region) ==
8 February 2026	PPJ/Faijat (9)	0-1	HooGee/23 (7)	Helsinki
21:00		Report	Perander 75'	Stadium: Intersport Areena TN; Attendance: 30; Referee: Lirim Hajdini

15 February 2026	SAPA (6)	4-3	Polin Pallo (6)	Helsinki
12:00	Palosaari 32'; Bui 43'; Aatos 70'; Sjöblom 90+2'	Report	Helenius 37', 45+1'; Eerola 90+5'	Stadium: Töölö PK 1 TN; Attendance: 12; Referee: Samuli Lyyra

15 February 2026	PiTa (7)	1-4	Valtti/2 (6)	Helsinki
12:00	Al-Abedi 80'	Report	Tarvainen 38'; Omar 45+1'; Aljanabi 57', 67'	Stadium: Töölö PK 3 TN; Attendance: 20; Referee: Rasmus Rannanpää

15 February 2026	FC POHU (6)	6-1	I-HK/Sensaatio(7)	Helsinki
15:00	Alasghar 9'; Kelmendi 18'; (o.g.) 30'; Hosaini 57'; Segerstråle 66'; Björklund 86'	Report	Havas 37'	Stadium: Töölö PK 1 TN; Attendance: 20; Referee: Sakari Ojanen

20 February 2026	Afro Foot Club (6)	0-7	SUMU/sob (6)	Helsinki
20:00		Report	Mbengeh 7', 60'; Ingoli 46', 81', 83'; Abdi 56', 88'	Stadium: Töölö PK 3 TN; Attendance: 0 Referee: Fereidoun Mohammadi

21 February 2026	LePa/Cityboys (8)	2-2 (6-7 p)	HJK/Töölön Ihme (8)	Espoo
13:00	Palmu 32'; Abbas 71'	Report	Somero 19'; Helminen 76'	Stadium: Keski-Espoo 1 TN; Attendance: 57; Referee: Niklas Heikkonen
	Penalties
	Lamberg (penalty scored); Kalle Nousiainen (penalty scored); Olli Nousiainen (penalty scored); Abbas (penalty missed); Markkanen (penalty scored); Häkkinen (penalty missed); Hellgren (penalty scored); Ivanov (penalty scored); Eljendy (penalty missed)		(penalty missed) Koskela; (penalty scored) Helminen; (penalty scored) Leppänen; (penalty scored) Helaseppä; (penalty scored) Seikku; (penalty missed) Kuittinen; (penalty scored) Eller; (penalty scored) Sundberg; (penalty scored) Tagimnok

21 February 2026	HIFK/2 (7)	4-0	FC Kontu/U23 (7)	Helsinki
19:00	Sistonen 34'; Maxhera 59'; Hämäläinen 61'; Korkeila 75'	Report		Stadium: Töölö PK 1 TN; Attendance: 37; Referee: Kim Nygren

22 February 2026	Helsinki United (8)	1-7	Ponnistus/2 (6)	Helsinki
15:45	Holmström 52'	Report	Çekiç 4'; Miettinen 23', 40'; Seuri 24', 45'; Hassan 26'; Hemiä 42'; Hiihtola 47'; Simonen 78'	Stadium: Oulunkylä 1 TN; Attendance: 0 Referee: Otto Helin

22 February 2026	PK-35/Äijät (9)	1-3	ToTe/Keparoi (7)	Helsinki
20:00	Hoti 84'	Report	Koskinen 33'; Nirhamo 49', 79'	Stadium: Tali halli TN; Attendance: 0 Referee: Jafar Musawi

27 February 2026	FC Hieho (6)	0-9	StaPa De Royale (6)	Helsinki
20:00		Report	Sankkinen 4'; Räsänen 9'; Oinonen 35', 49', 67'; Länsivuori 45'; Meriläinen 56'; Niemelä 87'; Salmi 88'	Stadium: Töölö PK 3 TN; Attendance: 20; Referee: Benjamin Lamberg

28 February 2026	KoiPS/Dynamo (8)	0-8	Olarin Kiksi (6)	Vantaa
16:00		Report	Östergård 12', 43', 84', 89'; Grassel 66'; Lundsten 71', 74'; Åström 90+1'	Stadium: Tikkurila TN; Attendance: 10; Referee: Tommi Berg

28 February 2026	MLHF/Reserves (8)	0-7	FC Honka/Leopardit (7)	Helsinki
17:00		Report	Huovila 3', 63', 82'; Raij 15'; Jylhä 65'; Bejedi 89'	Stadium: Töölö PK 3 TN; Attendance: 20; Referee: Simeone Leggio

1 March 2026	Lännen Torpedo (8)	2-3	FC Samba (7)	Helsinki
12:00	Lappalainen 38', 70'	Report	Wegelius 44'; Elk 75'; Koivisto 90+2'	Stadium: Töölö PK 3 TN; Attendance: 15; Referee: Strasdosky Otewa

1 March 2026	HePuLi (8)	1-3	Etu-Töölön Urhot (6)	Helsinki
19:00	Hakala 25'	Report	Rissanen 36'; Nummi 41'; Ojanen 89'	Stadium: Oulunkylä 2 TN; Attendance: 15; Referee: Seidou Balla

4 March 2026	Kasiysi/2 (7)	1-7	KOPSE/VI (7)	Espoo
20:15	Kapri 32'	Report	Rantala 8', 38', 60', 84'; Kääriä 16', 27'; Kohvakka 62'	Stadium: Karakallio TN; Attendance: 20; Referee: Fereidoun Mohammadi

5 March 2026	EsPa/Renat (6)	2-7	IF Gnistan/M35 (+35)	Helsinki
21:00	Uotila 30'; Karttunen 36'	Report	Mustonen 6'; Sihvola 22', 33'; Jurvainen 48'; Anttila 70', 88'; Korhonen 76'	Stadium: Oulunkylä 1 TN; Attendance: 20; Referee: Samuli Lyyra

7 March 2026	PPV (7)	0-10	FC POHU/CJ United (7)	Helsinki
10:00		Report	Rahkola 27'; Khan 35'; Kaateri 39'; Lahti 41'; Souris 59'; Laitila 68', 75', 77'; Paul 85', 87'	Stadium: Töölö PK 1 TN; Attendance: 0 Referee: Antti Erola

7 March 2026	Ponnistu/TK (9)	2-5	KPPK (8)	Helsinki
14:00	Siira 76'; Hietala 80'	Report	Kaijärvi 6', 36'; Tuomaala 46'; Vuotila 78', 83'	Stadium: Töölö PK 1 TN; Attendance: 50; Referee: Olli Kottonen

7 March 2026	FC Juvantus (8)	1-4	FC OHO UNITED (8)	Helsinki
19:00	Korkeala 27'	Report	Pallawala 12', 35', 49'; Clark 76'	Stadium: Töölö PK 1 TN; Attendance: 20; Referee: Vilppu Uusitalo

7 March 2026	Valtti/TDJ (9)	1-6	Mando United (7)	Helsinki
20:00	Kuronen 81'	Report	Penttinen 11', 52', 90+2'; Touray 19', 50'; Xhaferi 38'	Stadium: Hartwall Sport Areena TN; Attendance: 18; Referee: Ghulam Ahmadi

8 March 2026	FC POHU/Kova Kamppi (9)	0-7	FC Germania (7)	Helsinki
10:00		Report	Delizzos 13'; Kananen 44'; Boullenger 59', 73'; Väisänen 66', 74'; Suchodolski 72'	Stadium: Töölö PK 1 TN; Attendance: 20; Referee: James Clay

8 March 2026	HPS/Jägers (7)	0-5	PETO (7)	Helsinki
16:45		Report	Pukki 8', 36', 49'; Toiviainen 56'; Kemppainen 74'	Stadium: Töölö PK 3 TN; Attendance: 0 Referee: Pyry Liikonen

8 March 2026	HH Palloveikot (8)	0-5	KY United (7)	Helsinki
19:00		Report	Torkki 12', 40'; Välimäki 30'; Määttä 45'; Kurunmäki 72'	Stadium: Töölö PK 3 TN; Attendance: 67; Referee: Anselmi Valasmo

== Group 3 (Turku, Åland, Raseborg, Salo) ==
15 February 2026	Åbo reUnited (8)	3-5	FC Inter 3 (7)	Turku
18:00	Nummela 1'; Aaltonen 61', 63'	Report	Laanaya 16'; Huynh 18'; Duah 26', 34'; Slavgorodskij 90+3'	Stadium: Kupittaa 5 TN; Attendance: 20; Referee: Frans Sagulin

21 February 2026	LTU 2 (7)	1-4	TPS 2 (7)	Turku
13:30	Knuutila 30'	Report	Kytömäki 11'; Liukkonen 45+1'; Seppänen 49'; Parkkinen 89'	Stadium: Impivaara Areena; Attendance: 60; Referee: Elia Karlsson

22 February 2026	FC Snåbit (8)	1-16	Torre Calcio (7)	Naantali
20:00	Sirén 79'	Report	Montola 10', 67'; Penttinen 20', 25', 73'; Blomqvist 28', 53', 61'; Ikuli 33'; Ruuth 56', 71', 73', 75', 77', 90'; Rantanen 88'	Stadium: Karvetti TN; Attendance: 0 Referee: Niilo Heikkinen

27 February 2026	PIF 3 (7)	0-3	Peimari Utd 2 (7)	Paimio
19:00		Report	Frias 29'; Vieira Figueira 36'; Lempiäinen 81'	Stadium: Soikka TN; Attendance: 35; Referee: Samuil Georgiev

1 March 2026	KuuLa/2 (8)	2-10	BK-46 (6)	Naantali
17:00	Fadhil 55'; Viljanen 65'	Report	Kemboi 9', 35', 70', 73'; Sundholm 13'; Hordiienko 15'; Aldali 17'; Segersvärd 54'; Astrada 64'; Othman 85'	Stadium: Karvetti TN; Attendance: 25; Referee: Julius Hilska

1 March 2026	MaPS 2 (7)	6-0	SoVo (6)	Naantali
19:00	Huhtasalo 9', 23'; Pakarinen 16', 28'; Seker 19'; Raunio 63'	Report		Stadium: Karvetti TN; Attendance: 30; Referee: Mati Sarmad

2 March 2026	ÅIFK/2 (7)	4-3	AFC Campus (7)	Turku
20:00	Joronen 25'; Tuomisto 52'; Schüpbach 72'; Kaukonen 90+1'	Report	Bäckström 22'; Leppinen 49', 84'	Stadium: Kupittaa 5 TN; Attendance: 200; Referee: Topi Laakso

4 March 2026	TuPV (8)	1-1 (3-5 p)	TuWe (6)	Turku
19:00	Enkkelä 26'	Report	Broberg 90+2'	Stadium: Kupittaa 5 TN; Attendance: 20; Referee: Joonas Jousimo
	Penalties
	Bildo (penalty scored); Järvinen (penalty missed); Enkkelä (penalty scored); Kaukinen (penalty scored)		(penalty scored) Kuparinen; (penalty scored) Vihilehti; (penalty scored) Broberg; (penalty scored) Korbelainen; (penalty scored) Wendelin

5 March 2026	Velehot (8)	4-1	KuuLa (6)	Naantali
20:15	Viitanen 11'; Youssef 23'; Sandelin 32', 57'	Report	Hulkkonen 15'	Stadium: Karvetti TN; Attendance: 67; Referee: Samuil Georgiev

7 March 2026	JIK (7)	7-0	FC Boda (7)	Jomala
17:00	Welander 8', 17', 20', 35'; Åberg 24'; Söderlund 56'; Josefsson 64'	Report		Stadium: Vikingvallen konstgräs Attendance: 0 Referee: Niclas Fagerlund

7 March 2026	PoFu United (8)	4-0	LoPS (7)	Kaarina
17:00	Matintalo 26', 66'; Raitanen 31'; Heinonen 61'	Report		Stadium: Keskuskenttä 3 TN; Attendance: 35; Referee: Dzemal Dzebo

7 March 2026	PöKa (8)	0-6	FC HIK (6)	Naantali
17:00		Report	Fagerström 11', 26', 27', 32'; Boström 57'; Blomqvist 64'	Stadium: Karvetti TN; Attendance: 0 Referee: L Mati Sarmad

8 March 2026	KaaPS (8)	1-2	Jyske (7)	Kaarina
14:00	Uusitalo 64'	Report	Suomela 58'; Vilola 90+3'	Stadium: Keskuskenttä 3 TN; Attendance: 20; Referee: Elia Karlsson

8 March 2026	FC RP (7)	2-4	TPK (7)	Naantali
18:30	Tuominen 14'; Vuolukka 68'	Report	Lehtonen 5'; Veijalainen 41'; Stjärnstedt 90+2'; Metsäaro 90+4'	Stadium: Karvetti TN; Attendance: 0 Referee: Sakari Saikkonen

== Group 4 (Tampere, Häme, Pori, Rauma) ==
20 February 2026	Gmestarit (7)	3-2	Härmä (6)	Hämeenlinna
20:00	Hiiloskorpi 11'; Lautala 56'; Baruffa 87'	Report	Viljanen 38'; Vappula 83'	Stadium: Säästöpankki Areena TN; Attendance: 50; Referee: Mikko Lähteenmäki

20 February 2026	FC Vapsi (8)	1-3	Ylöjärvi United FC/2 (7)	Eura
20:00	Hakanen 40'	Report	Koivunen 3', 21'; Hyseni 42'	Stadium: OP-Areena TN; Attendance: 10; Referee: Saku Nieminen

21 February 2026	ToVe 2 (7)	0-4	FC Eurajoki (6)	Pori
12:00		Report	Ciastek 45', 84'; Mäntyharju 66'; Gustafsson 68'	Stadium: UK-Tekonurmi; Attendance: 10; Referee: Miro Leppäkoski

21 February 2026	MäKi (7)	1-4	Loiske Visa (7)	Pori
19:30	Aavikko 5'	Report	Gröhn 34', 68', 84'; Lähteenmaa 46'	Stadium: Karhuhalli TN; Attendance: 20; Referee: Petri Viljanen

25 February 2026	Peräkylän Pallo (7)	0-3	VaKP (6)	Valkeakoski
20:00		Report	Virkki 64', 71'; Salonen 67'	Stadium: Palloiluhalli TN; Attendance: 80; Referee: Teppo Koskinen

28 February 2026	Velenpojat (8)	0-5	Tampere United/3 (7)	Valkeakoski
12:00		Report	Syrjä 19'; Kopf 40'; Haritonov 45'; Hämäläinen 49'; (o.g.) 79'	Stadium: Palloiluhalli TN; Attendance: 50; Referee: Lenni Jurvanen

28 February 2026	FisU/2 (7)	1-6	JanPa (6)	Tampere
18:30	Romu 37'	Report	Pyry Pulkkinen 17'; Paussu 20'; Pruuki 47', 65', 80'; Okko Pulkkinen 63'	Stadium: Kauppi 1 TN talvikenttä Attendance: 20; Referee: Juha Kivistö

28 February 2026	ViiPV (8)	3-2	FC Varapelaajat (8)	Valkeakoski
20:00	Tromstedt 19'; Siltanen 27'; Patrikainen 85'	Report	Arvaja 25'; Vänninmaja 43'	Stadium: Palloiluhalli TN; Attendance: 50; Referee: Teppo Koskinen

1 March 2026	LuVe (8)	0-1	Messukylä United (7)	Rauma
18:30		Report	Seljavaara 78'	Stadium: Äijänsuo stadion TN; Attendance: 0 Referee: Joni Lindstedt

1 March 2026	Jehut (8)	0-5	EuPa 2 (7)	Hämeenlinna
20:20		Report	Hesso 33'; Markkanen 41'; Koivisto 62'; Parviainen 88'; Pietilä 89'	Stadium: Säästöpankki Areena TN; Attendance: 32; Referee: Onni Kaukiainen

4 March 2026	FC Eurajoki/II (8)	0-17	Ilves/4 (7)	Eura
19:40		Report	Nikkilä 1', 7', 7', 9', 13', 22'; Uimonen 36', 72'; Jokinen 40', 49', 64'; Johansson 50'; Palomäki 53', 78', 86'; Chouaib 80', 90'	Stadium: OP-Areena TN; Attendance: 12; Referee: Niko Parviainen

7 March 2026	SOHO SS (9)	3-10	PP-70 (8)	Tampere
13:00	Niemelä 34'; Kumara 72'; Kumpulainen 90'	Report	Sola 18', 28', 54', 58'; Leinonen 30'; Penttilä 39'; Arvola 46'; Toivola 48'; Perlas 77'; Vesalainen 83'	Stadium: Kauppi 2 TN talvikenttä Attendance: 30; Referee: Tomi Gröhn

7 March 2026	Tuisku (7)	0-5	TamFu (7)	Nokia
16:00		Report	Virta 2', 39'; Niemi 16'; Laaksonen 20'; Rajasalo 88'	Stadium: Menkala TN; Attendance: 11; Referee: Hannu Pajunen

7 March 2026	FC Kangasala/2 (7)	0-3	FC Lasten 2 (6)	Tampere
19:00		Report	Aronen 41'; Al-Khafaji 45'; Farhad 90+2'	Stadium: Kauppi 1 TN talvikenttä Attendance: 0 Referee: Vilho Tolonen

7 March 2026	HirPy (8)	1-4	Nasta (7)	Tampere
19:00	Hassi 50'	Report	Männistö 26'; Ellä N 55'; Saariola 61', 90'	Stadium: Kauppi 2 TN talvikenttä Attendance: 50; Referee: Hannu Pajunen

7 March 2026	HJS/sininen (8)	4-1	Lavilan Kisa (7)	Hämeenlinna
20:00	Munyandamutsa 13', 41'; Kumpulainen R 64'; Tuomi 74'	Report	Ojala 7'	Stadium: Säästöpankki Areena TN; Attendance: 30; Referee: Arttu Lähteenmäki

8 March 2026	FC Ulvila /2 (8)	3–0 w/o	Mandem CF
		Report		Attendance: 0

8 March 2026	Tampere United/4 (9)	1-5	Ylöjärven Ilves (7)	Tampere
11:45	Pekkarinen 28'	Report	Lindman 15'; Komppa J 56'; Keskinen 68'; Ruissalo 90'; Peltola 90+1'	Stadium: Kauppi 2 TN talvikenttä Attendance: 30; Referee: Perttu Mukkala

8 March 2026	FC Haka j./2 (7)	1-9	TOVE (6)	Valkeakoski
12:10	Strandson 5'	Report	Kontio 2'; Sulonen 12', 17', 32', 85'; Malmivuori 18', 30'; Mäkelä N 71'; Koivisto 80'	Stadium: Palloiluhalli TN; Attendance: 10; Referee: Mika Uurainen

8 March 2026	FC Helmi Jätkä (9)	0-3	ACE/2 (6)	Tampere
13:50		Report	Peltola 18'; Jormalainen 27'; Hämäläinen 84'	Stadium: Kauppi 2 TN talvikenttä Attendance: 30; Referee: Roope Nutikka

8 March 2026	NoPS/3 (8)	0-11	PiPo-79 (6)	Nokia
14:00		Report	Multala 4'; Jäppinen 6', 21', 40', 60'; Häkkinen 27'; Vänttilä 33', 45'; Kananen 37', 53'; Rautamies 59'	Stadium: Menkala TN; Attendance: 30; Referee: Oskari Aro

8 March 2026	MouMa (8)	5-2	FC HaPo (7)	Tampere
16:00	Kausiala 21', 38', 45+2'; Vesa E 26'; Lyytikäinen Roo 69'	Report	Kestinmäki 52'; Nironen 90+3'	Stadium: Kauppi 2 TN talvikenttä Attendance: 68; Referee: Vilho Tolonen

8 March 2026	Apassit (8)	3-4	TPV/3 (7)	Tampere
18:30	Vaittinen 13', 15'; Salmi 28'	Report	Jokela 36', 87'; Honko 48'; Ketola 83'	Stadium: Kauppi 2 TN talvikenttä Attendance: 50; Referee: Hannu Pajunen

8 March 2026	KOOVEE (8)	5-4	FC Teivo (8)	Tampere
19:30	Alkki V 5'; Räsänen 45', 56'; Lähteenmäki L 51'; Hirvonen 59'	Report	Ristiluoma 2', 18', 33'; Keski-Kastari 14'	Stadium: Kauppi 1 TN talvikenttä Attendance: 0 Referee: Juho Muikku

== Group 5 (Uusimaa) ==
21 February 2026	JäPS/Akatemia 2 (8)	2-5	FC Kulmakikka (8)	Järvenpää
13:00	Danso 3', 70'	Report	Ntare 2', 53', 56'; Iljanto 36'; Kosonen 90+1'	Stadium: Monitoimihalli TN; Attendance: 20; Referee: Ville Parviainen

21 February 2026	ToBK (6)	2-0	TuPS/M35 (+35)	Kerava
13:00	Eriksson 73'; Fager 90+5'	Report		Stadium: Kaleva UP TN; Attendance: 6 Referee: Joni Juntto

7 March 2026	JäPS/Akatemia (7)	2-1	NuPS/2 (6)	Järvenpää
12:30	Kiviranta 63', 67'	Report	Niemi Je 82'	Stadium: Monitoimihalli TN; Attendance: 20; Referee: Matti Blom

7 March 2026	KelA/Akatemia (7)	1-3	TuPS/Skavaböle (6)	Järvenpää
18:05	Koivisto 59'	Report	Liukola 75'; Anttinen 89'; Seppänen S 90+4'	Stadium: Monitoimihalli TN; Attendance: 30; Referee: Seidou Balla

8 March 2026	NJS/2 (7)	2-3	RiPS/2 (7)	Nurmijärvi
15:00	Vainikainen 90'; Sariola 90+4'	Report	Murtonen 17', 47'; Tiilola 43'	Stadium: Klaukkala TN; Attendance: 52; Referee: Ersan Mutlu

8 March 2026	RistiFemma (8)	0-2	JäPS/United (7)	Vantaa
20:45		Report	Ripatti R 43'; Sweidan 68'	Stadium: Kalmuuri halli TN; Attendance: 0 Referee: Ijaad Eltabakh

== Group 6 (Lahti, Kymenlaakso, South Karelia) ==
17 February 2026	KyPa (7)	7-0	LuPo (6)	Kotka
20:00	Kuusimäki 27', 30'; Sorva 36'; (o.g.) 42'; Peltoniemi 65'; Turunen 73'; Hytti 90'	Report		Stadium: Urheiluhalli TN; Attendance: 15; Referee: Erik Pakkala

18 February 2026	FC Lahti/3 (7)	2-0	HP-47 (6)	Lahti
21:00	Koljonen 45+2'; Toukonen 48'	Report		Stadium: Mukkula Halli TN; Attendance: 30; Referee: Enosh Monga

22 February 2026	PoPo (8)	4-3	Jäntevä (6)	Kotka
17:00	Nykänen 15', 36', 52'; Puhakka 19'	Report	Laaksonen 49'; Launiainen 52'; Wathen 64'	Stadium: Urheiluhalli TN; Attendance: 67; Referee: Anton Lindberg

28 February 2026	Mäntsälän Urheilijat (8)	0-4	PaPe (7)	Mäntsälä
13:00		Report	Abdelli 24'; Ovaska 56'; Rämä 74'; Heikkilä 90+6'	Stadium: Mäntsälä TN; Attendance: 100; Referee: Tomi Koskelainen

1 March 2026	HaTP (8)	7-1	Lahden United (8)	Kouvola
14:00	Tohmo 5', 44'; Rämä 17'; Pakkala 32', 41', 56'; Lavikainen 76'	Report	Yusif 90+1'	Stadium: Sami Hyypiä Areena TN; Attendance: 20; Referee: Eemeli Piirala

1 March 2026	Flamingo United (7)	3-4	RPS Lions (6)	Lahti
18:30	Berbache 33'; Babenko 79'; Adegoke 83'	Report	Penttilä 26'; Tossavainen 31', 58'; Kontunen 90+5'	Stadium: Kisapuisto Stadion TN; Attendance: 0 Referee: Antti Närekorpi

7 March 2026	LIK (8)	0-5	FC Tajuboys (8)	Sipoo
18:00		Report	Helenius 11'; Multanen 16'; Lojander 28'; Anttonen 70'; Tynkkynen 81'	Stadium: Söderkulla TN; Attendance: 10; Referee: Danial Khaledi

8 March 2026	MyPa/FC (8)	1-4	KarPo (7)	Kuusankoski
14:00	Siltala 65'	Report	Huopainen 33'; Jokela To 45+1'; Hannula Jo 68'; Lassila 80'	Stadium: Sami Hyypiä Areena TN; Attendance: 39; Referee: Tuomas Karhu

== Group 7 (Central Finland, South Savo, North Karelia) ==
19 February 2026	Inter Jyväskylä (7)	1-3	FCV/Reds (6)	Laukaa
20:00	Kumpulainen 18'	Report	Lahti 32'; Kivelä 43'; Saarinen 74'	Stadium: Leppäveden LP Ylipainehalli; Attendance: 15; Referee: Ilja Timonen

22 February 2026	JiiKoo (7)	1-11	Nousu (6)	Mikkeli
17:15	Kontulainen 31'	Report	Saarikoski 17', 23', 41'; Lasse Koittola 18', 66'; Olli Koittola 36'; Pesonen 68', 68', 79'; Nummi 73'; Hirvonen 78'	Stadium: Mikkelin jp-halli Attendance: 40; Referee: Ilkka Mäkelä

1 March 2026	Harjun Potku (8)	0-8	MuurY (7)	Jyväskylä
14:00		Report	Nejlik 29', 51', 59'; Venäläinen 44'; Huttunen 57'; Mehto 65', 70'; Puttonen 86'	Stadium: Huhtahalli TN; Attendance: 64; Referee: Jonne Pesola

1 March 2026	FC Jyväskylä (7)	5-6	OuPa (6)	Jyväskylä
16:00	Peltonen 14'; Mehto 16', 43'; Rautiainen 41'; Rantanen 63'	Report	Tahvanainen 23', 79'; Hassinen 45'; Klimov 72', 85'; Huttunen 76'	Stadium: Huhtahalli TN; Attendance: 97; Referee: John Fikirini

1 March 2026	FCV/Reds II (8)	0-6	Komeetat/Piuku (6)	Jyväskylä
18:30		Report	Pulkkinen 24'; Kuusrainen 33'; Piik 68'; Nevala 83'; Rekola 85'; Rutanen 90+1'	Stadium: Huhtahalli TN; Attendance: 150; Referee: Riki Yari

== Group 8 (North Savo, Kainuu) ==
15 February 2026	SuPS (7)	7-2	Raiku (7)	Iisalmi
15:00	Sami Moilanen 34', 59', 63'; (o.g.) 41'; Ikonen 43'; Veikko-Oskari Moilanen 55'; El Atba 69'	Report	Tsavaris 19'; Niva 84'	Stadium: Jalkapallohalli TN; Attendance: 20; Referee: Harkko Helvelahti

22 February 2026	FC Tarzan (7)	3-4	KuKi (6)	Kuopio
18:45	Eskelinen 35'; Vänskä 72'; Sairanen 78'	Report	(o.g.) 5'; Airaksinen 30'; Rasmus 31', 90+2'	Stadium: Lippumäki Ylipainehalli TN; Attendance: 100; Referee: Eemil Haatainen

1 March 2026	LaPa-95 (7)	1-9	Kuopion Elo (6)	Kuopio
20:00	Pekkarinen 81'	Report	Pentikäinen 42', 69', 73', 86'; Rönkkö 45'; Hartikainen 47'; Ojalehto 67'; Seppälä 70'; Mutenure 74'	Stadium: Lippumäki Ylipainehalli TN; Attendance: 30; Referee: Eeli Törnroos

4 March 2026	WJK (6)	5-4	PAVE (6)	Iisalmi
19:00	Vertti Torvinen 20', 58', 90+2'; Aatu Oskari Torvinen 54', 90'	Report	Joni Kumpulainen 10', 45'; Henri Kumpulainen 24', 67'	Stadium: Jalkapallohalli TN; Attendance: 30; Referee: Santeri Lyyra

== Group 9 (Ostrobothnia, South Ostrobothnia, Central Ostrobothnia) ==
21 February 2026	KJV/Kanu (8)	0-7	Norrvalla FF (6)	Lapua
18:45		Report	Österlun 36', 47', 49', 53', 89'; Rex 65'; Pitkäkangas 90'	Stadium: Patruuna Areena TN; Attendance: 80; Referee: Miki Kalliokoski

21 February 2026	Laihia Uinted FC (8)	0-9	BK-48 (6)	Vaasa
20:00		Report	Shkreta 4'; Pedersen 10'; Toivio 17', 79'; Elenius 36'; Papula 40'; Lax 55'; Asplund 63'; Teir 70'	Stadium: Veo Arena; Attendance: 0 Referee: Vahidin Bajic

21 February 2026	Sisu/3 (8)	0-6	Kaskö IK (7)	Seinäjoki
20:30		Report	Mujkic 16', 22', 75', 80'; Imamovic 32'; Begic 82'	Stadium: WallSport-Areena TN; Attendance: 50; Referee: Olli-Jussi Sariola

23 February 2026	Sisu/2 (7)	0-5	LappBK (7)	Kuortane
20:00		Report	Mattila 33', 53', 63', 82'; Endlund 87'	Stadium: Ilkka-Areena TN; Attendance: 28; Referee: Arttu Rahko

6 March 2026	TUS (8)	1-1 (2-4 p)	IK (7)	Bennäs
20:30	Sandström 27'	Report	Hautala 73'	Stadium: LKI Arena TN; Attendance: 76; Referee: Saku Peltonen
	Penalties
	Uusitalo (penalty scored); Hästbacka (penalty scored); Sandström (penalty missed); Granholm (penalty missed)		Mäenpää (penalty missed); Haaparanta (penalty scored); Hautala (penalty scored); Risku (penalty scored); Uusitalo (penalty scored)

7 March 2026	Solf IK (8)	0-3	Sisu (6)	Korsholm
20:30		Report	Phromprasert 10'; Uutela 42'; Aden 69'	Stadium: Botniahalli sisä TN; Attendance: 30; Referee: Vahidin Bajic

== Group 10 (North Ostrobothnia, Lapland, Kemi) ==
14 February 2026	FC RIO GRANDE (7)	4-1	Ruusut FC (6)	Rovaniemi
16:30	Piitulainen 13'; Ronkainen 65'; Olabisi 71'; Ojaniemi 77'	Report	Roine 38'	Stadium: Ounashalli TN; Attendance: 42; Referee: Mikko Rantala

21 February 2026	HC Laatupallo (7)	0-7	KTU (6)	Oulu
12:15		Report	Leskelä 15', 22', 35', 58'; Pulkkinen 51'; Halonen 57'; Lauri 77'	Stadium: Heinäpää PH TN; Attendance: 38; Referee: Matias Mällinen

22 February 2026	KKP (7)	2-0	JPJ (7)	Oulu
13:45	Saikkonen 53'; Ratava 67'	Report		Stadium: Heinäpää PH TN; Attendance: 33; Referee: Konsta Repo

28 February 2026	Kolarin Kontio (7)	3-7	OuJK (6)	Rovaniemi
15:45	Ahonen 10'; Hellsten 11', 79'	Report	(o.g.) 8'; Ulander 23', 88'; Pohjola 28'; Puurunen 45+1', 74'; Koskinen 61'	Stadium: Ounashalli TN; Attendance: 30; Referee: John Wikman

28 February 2026	Puleward City (7)	1-2	OuTa (6)	Oulu
18:15	Alatulkkila 45+10'	Report	Juntunen 60'; Katajamäki 85'	Stadium: Heinäpää PH TN; Attendance: 21; Referee: Joel Merikanto

1 March 2026	Kairan Kärki FC (7)	1-7	OTP (6)	Rovaniemi
13:30	Närhilä 85'	Report	Mahdi 9', 65'; Isokangas 14', 24', 33'; (o.g.) 21'; Pelkonen 59'	Stadium: Ounashalli TN; Attendance: 41; Referee: Jani Salminen

1 March 2026	FC Santa Claus/2 (7)	2-2 (2-4 p)	Hercules-j (5)	Rovaniemi
15:30	Kaipainen 13'; Kontiola 43'	Report	Kiviniemi 13'; Salo 55'	Stadium: Ounashalli TN; Attendance: 85; Referee: Suvi Tulonen
	Penalties
	Kynsijärvi (penalty scored); Haakana (penalty missed); Otra-Aho (penalty missed); San (penalty scored)		(penalty scored) Salo; (penalty scored) Kiviniemi; (penalty scored) Holappa; (penalty scored) Kainu
