= FC POHU =

Finnish football club

- Full name: FC Pohjois-Haagan Urheilijat
- Nickname(s): POHU
- Founded: 1957; 68 years ago
- Ground: Tali, Helsinki, Finland
- Chairman: Esko Manninen
- Manager: Esko Manninen
- Coach: Valtteri Honkanen
- League: Kolmonen
Home colours

Pohjois-Haagan Urheilijat (abbreviated FC POHU) is a football club from Pohjois-Haaga in Helsinki, Finland. The club was formed in 1957 and has developed into a very large organisation with a large number of teams competing in various leagues. There are currently around eleven teams competing at senior level, and many more at junior level. As of 2024, the club had a team playing in Finnish seventh-tier Vitonen.

== History ==
The construction of the Pohjois-Haaga (North Haaga) district of Helsinki began in the early 1950s and at that time there were about a thousand inhabitants. By 1957 the population had grown to nearly ten thousand, including a substantial number of children. This created pressure on the establishment of a sports club.

On 15 November 1957 a number of proactive residents held a meeting and founded the Pohjois-Haagan Urheilijat club (North Haaga Sportsmen's club). The club soon offered multi-sports opportunities and a focus for young people who were interested in sport.

By 1960 the club had representative sides competing at football, handball, volleyball and bandy. By the late 1970s POHU specialised at club football and women's football activity increased. Success in the late 1960s saw the club men's team progress to Division IV and then to Division III and almost gain promotion to the old Division II in 1971. They eventually succeeded in 1976. The year 1977 proved to be the club's pinnacle with one season in the Kakkonen, the third tier of Finnish football. In the subsequent years the team has played in Division III (Kolmonen) and Division IV (Nelonen).

The late 1980s and the 1990s saw the rapid expansion of the junior section with the formation of numerous boys and girls teams.

== Season to season ==
Season	Level	Division	Section	Administration	Position	Movements
2000	Tier 4	Kolmonen (Third Division)	Section 1	Helsinki & Uusimaa (SPL Helsinki)	9th	
2001	Tier 4	Kolmonen (Third Division)	Section 1	Helsinki & Uusimaa (SPL Uusimaa)	11th	Relegated
2002	Tier 5	Nelonen (Fourth Division)	Section 2	Helsinki District (SPL Helsinki)	1st	Promoted
2003	Tier 4	Kolmonen (Third Division)	Section 3	Helsinki & Uusimaa (SPL Helsinki)	7th	
2004	Tier 4	Kolmonen (Third Division)	Section 3	Helsinki & Uusimaa (SPL Helsinki)	6th	
2005	Tier 4	Kolmonen (Third Division)	Section 3	Helsinki & Uusimaa (SPL Helsinki)	7th	
2006	Tier 4	Kolmonen (Third Division)	Section 3	Helsinki & Uusimaa (SPL Helsinki)	8th	
2007	Tier 4	Kolmonen (Third Division)	Section 2	Helsinki & Uusimaa (SPL Helsinki)	4th	
2008	Tier 4	Kolmonen (Third Division)	Section 2	Helsinki & Uusimaa (SPL Uusimaa)	11th	Relegated
2009	Tier 5	Nelonen (Fourth Division)	Section 1	Helsinki District (SPL Helsinki)	1st	Promoted
2010	Tier 4	Kolmonen (Third Division)	Section 2	Helsinki & Uusimaa (SPL Uusimaa)	4th	
2011	Tier 4	Kolmonen (Third Division)	Section 1	Helsinki & Uusimaa (SPL Uusimaa)	7th	
2012	Tier 4	Kolmonen (Third Division)	Section 3	Helsinki & Uusimaa (SPL Uusimaa)	1st	Promoted
2013	Tier 3	Kakkonen (Second Division)	East Group	Finnish FA (Suomen Pallolitto)	10th	Relegated
2014	Tier 4	Kolmonen (Third Division)	Section 2	Helsinki & Uusimaa (SPL Uusimaa)		

- 2 seasons in Kakkonen
- 11 seasons in Kolmonen
- 2 seasons in Nelonen

== Structure ==
The club runs a large number of teams including 7 men's teams, 3 veteran's teams, 1 ladies team and a very wide range of boys and girls junior teams.

== 2010 season ==
FC POHU are competing in Section 2 (Lohko 2) of the Kolmonen administered by the Helsinki SPL and Uusimaa SPL. This is the fourth highest tier in the Finnish football system. In 2009 FC POHU were promoted from the Nelonen.

FC POHU/2 are competing in Section 1 (Lohko 1) of the Nelonen administered by the Helsinki SPL.

FC POHU/Playboys are competing in Section 1 (Lohko 1) of the Vitonen administered by the Helsinki SPL. In 2009 they were promoted from the Kutonen.

FC POHU/Swigu are competing in Section 2 (Lohko 2) of the Vitonen administered by the Helsinki SPL. In 2009 they were promoted from the Kutonen.

FC POHU/Simpsons are competing in Section 3 (Lohko 3) of the Vitonen administered by the Helsinki SPL.

FC POHU/Susijengi are competing in Section 1 (Lohko 1) of the Kutonen administered by the Helsinki SPL. In 2009 they were promoted from the Seiska.

FC POHU/Shrimps are competing in Section 2 (Lohko 2) of the Kutonen administered by the Helsinki SPL.

== References and sources ==
- Official website
- Suomen Cup (archived)
