= 2009 Seiska =

League tables for teams participating in Seiska, the eighth and final tier in the Finnish Soccer League system, in 2009.

== 2009 League tables ==
=== Helsinki ===
==== Section 1 ====
Pos	Team	Pld	W	D	L	GF	GA	GD	Pts	Promotion
1	FC ALPC	12	8	4	0	33	3	+30	28	Promoted
2	FC KaKe	12	7	2	3	26	10	+16	23	Promoted
3	FC East	12	6	5	1	17	7	+10	23	Promoted
4	KPPK	12	7	2	3	31	12	+19	23	Promoted
5	Valtti/Allstars	12	6	4	2	23	11	+12	22	
6	Vesa/Stadi	12	6	3	3	25	12	+13	21	
7	MoPo	12	6	3	3	18	14	+4	21	
8	FC Kontu/3	12	5	2	5	27	28	−1	17	
9	HPS/Jägers	12	3	1	8	8	27	−19	10	
10	AC Balls	12	3	0	9	12	16	−4	9	
11	FC Elite	12	2	2	8	5	41	−36	8	
12	FC Sammakot	12	2	1	9	11	30	−19	7	
13	HuPaVeikot	12	1	3	8	8	33	−25	6	

Source: SPL Helsinki

==== Section 2 ====
Pos	Team	Pld	W	D	L	GF	GA	GD	Pts	Promotion
1	FC BrBr	12	11	0	1	32	7	+25	33	Promoted
2	Gnistan/Roots	12	10	1	1	44	6	+38	31	Promoted
3	FC Puimur	12	9	1	2	21	4	+17	28	Promoted
4	FC FC	12	7	2	3	32	15	+17	23	Promoted
5	FC POHU/Susijengi	12	6	2	4	23	16	+7	20	Promoted
6	JP13	12	4	3	5	15	31	−16	15	
7	Orson	12	4	3	5	13	19	−6	15	
8	FC Kontu/0	12	4	2	6	19	26	−7	14	
9	Ruila	12	3	2	7	16	22	−6	11	
10	JJ Vepo	12	2	4	6	8	20	−12	10	
11	Canona	12	2	2	8	10	32	−22	8	
12	Colo-Colo/DOS	12	2	1	9	16	28	−12	7	
13	Cantona	12	2	1	9	17	40	−23	7	

Source: SPL Helsinki

==== Section 3 ====
Pos	Team	Pld	W	D	L	GF	GA	GD	Pts	Promotion
1	HIFK/3	12	9	3	0	42	11	+31	30	Promoted
2	Stallions	12	8	2	2	35	11	+24	26	Promoted
3	Ruisku/09	12	8	1	3	23	15	+8	25	Promoted
4	FC Kontu/4	12	6	4	2	16	11	+5	22	Promoted
5	Veijarit	12	6	2	4	22	22	0	20	Promoted
6	FC HEIV	12	5	4	3	21	16	+5	19	Promoted
7	HDS/Magnifiga	12	4	3	5	16	26	−10	15	
8	Dynamo	12	4	2	6	21	28	−7	14	
9	HerTo/3	12	2	6	4	17	18	−1	12	
10	FC Wartti/WB	12	3	2	7	18	29	−11	11	
11	Ellas/FC Aztecas	12	3	2	7	13	23	−10	11	
12	Dicken	12	1	3	8	17	30	−13	6	
13	HC42	12	1	2	9	16	37	−21	5	

Source: SPL Helsinki

==== Section Winners play-offs ====
Pos	Team	Pld	W	D	L	GF	GA	GD	Pts
1	FC ALPC	2	2	0	0	5	1	+4	6
2	FC BrBr	2	1	0	1	2	4	−2	3
3	HIFK/3	2	0	0	2	0	2	−2	0

Source: SPL Helsinki

== References and sources ==
- Finnish FA
- ResultCode
- Seiska (jalkapallo) (in Finnish)
