= 2009 Kutonen =

League tables for teams participating in Kutonen, the seventh tier of the Finnish Soccer League system, in 2009.

== 2009 League tables ==
=== Helsinki ===
==== Section 1 ====
Pos	Team	Pld	W	D	L	GF	GA	GD	Pts	Promotion or relegation
1	FC POHU/Swigu	10	8	2	0	28	10	+18	26	Promoted
2	Vesa/Töölö	10	6	3	1	31	10	+21	21	Promoted
3	Käpylän Sekunda	10	6	0	4	24	15	+9	18	Play-offs
4	FC Bombers	10	5	1	4	16	16	0	16	
5	KPR	10	3	6	1	16	12	+4	15	
6	AC StaSi/Europort	10	3	4	3	13	14	−1	13	
7	HDS/Express	10	4	1	5	14	19	−5	13	
8	Sheikit	10	3	3	4	16	17	−1	12	
9	Ompun Pomppu	10	2	1	7	12	29	−17	7	
10	Grumset	10	1	3	6	10	26	−16	6	
11	FFR/Väiski	10	1	2	7	5	17	−12	5	Relegated

Source: SPL Helsinki

Note: PPJ/Haastajat Withdrew

==== Section 2 ====
Pos	Team	Pld	W	D	L	GF	GA	GD	Pts	Promotion or relegation
1	Geishan Pallo	11	9	1	1	36	10	+26	28	Promoted
2	FFR	11	7	1	3	21	10	+11	22	Promoted
3	LauttaPallo	11	7	1	3	21	12	+9	22	Play-offs
4	Dal	11	6	1	4	24	13	+11	19	
5	Tavastia/FC Mojo	11	5	2	4	21	15	+6	17	
6	HJK-j/Kmäki 2	11	5	2	4	13	13	0	17	
7	FC POHU/Shrimps	11	5	1	5	21	27	−6	16	
8	EHP	11	4	3	4	27	24	+3	15	
9	Zyklon/2	11	5	0	6	16	21	−5	15	
10	PETO	11	3	5	3	14	16	−2	14	
11	Cosmos	11	1	1	9	13	28	−15	4	
12	FC Pakila	11	0	0	11	7	45	−38	0	Relegated

Source: SPL Helsinki

==== Section 3 ====
Pos	Team	Pld	W	D	L	GF	GA	GD	Pts	Promotion or relegation
1	Töölön Taisto	11	10	1	0	47	7	+40	31	Promoted
2	SAPA/2	11	9	0	2	53	11	+42	27	Promoted
3	FC POHU/Playboys	11	8	2	1	37	11	+26	26	Play-offs
4	Zoom	11	4	4	3	14	16	−2	16	
5	Trikiinit	11	5	0	6	26	38	−12	15	
6	Pallo	11	4	3	4	15	19	−4	15	
7	HeMan/1	11	5	0	6	17	35	−18	15	
8	HePu	11	3	3	5	27	34	−7	12	
9	WäSy	11	4	0	7	19	22	−3	12	
10	HakPa	11	3	2	6	11	21	−10	11	
11	Kullervo	11	1	2	8	6	30	−24	5	Relegated
12	Hyeenat	11	1	1	9	11	39	−28	4	Relegated

Source: SPL Helsinki

==== Section 4 ====
Pos	Team	Pld	W	D	L	GF	GA	GD	Pts	Promotion or relegation
1	MaKu/Legends	11	7	3	1	26	11	+15	24	Promoted
2	HJK-j/Lsalo	11	5	4	2	32	14	+18	19	Promoted
3	SUMU/77	11	6	1	4	22	15	+7	19	Play-offs
4	HerTo/2	11	5	3	3	20	12	+8	18	
5	Ponnistajat	11	6	0	5	21	19	+2	18	
6	Ylis-78	11	4	5	2	17	9	+8	17	
7	MPS/4	11	5	2	4	18	13	+5	17	
8	FC Viikingit/05	11	5	2	4	21	19	+2	17	
9	Vatanspor	11	5	0	6	20	24	−4	15	
10	FC Härät	11	3	2	6	14	22	−8	11	
11	FC Sonnit	11	2	1	8	13	28	−15	7	Relegated
12	PeTe	11	0	3	8	7	45	−38	3	Relegated

Source: SPL Helsinki

==== Promotion play-offs ====
1. Käpylän Sekunda (Section 1/III)	LauttaPallo (Section 2/III)	2-2 (0-1) pen 5-4
2. FC POHU/Playboys (Section 3/III)	SUMU/77 (Section 4/III)	3-2

Käpylän Sekunda (Winners 1)	FC POHU/Playboys (Winners 2)	1-3 (0-2)
LauttaPallo (Losers 1)	SUMU/77 (Losers 2)	3-0 (1-0)

FC POHU/Playboys - Promoted

Source - Results & Final Table: SPL Helsinki

==== Section Winners Ranking play-offs ====
Töölön Taisto (Lohko 3/I)	MaKu/Legends (Lohko 4/I)	2-0 (0-0)
FC POHU/Swigu (Lohko 1/I)	Geishan Pallo (Lohko 2/I)	1-1 pen 4-3

Geishan Pallo (Losers 1)	MaKu/Legends (Losers 2)	1-0 (1-0)
FC POHU/Swigu (Winners 1)	Töölön Taisto (Winners 2)	0-3 (0-2)

Source - Results & Final Table: SPL Helsinki

=== Uusimaa ===
==== Section 1 ====
Pos	Team	Pld	W	D	L	GF	GA	GD	Pts	Promotion
1	VeVe	16	11	3	2	37	15	+22	36	Promoted
2	KarlU	16	9	3	4	35	14	+21	30	
3	Hukat	16	7	4	5	33	22	+11	25	
4	MasKi 2	16	8	1	7	23	24	−1	25	
5	FC G.A.B	16	7	3	6	33	21	+12	24	
6	GrIFK 2	16	6	5	5	15	14	+1	23	
7	KJS	16	4	3	9	17	32	−15	15	
8	FC WILD	16	4	2	10	13	28	−15	14	
9	KasvU	16	4	0	12	22	58	−36	12	

Source: SPL Uusimaa

==== Section 2 ====
Pos	Team	Pld	W	D	L	GF	GA	GD	Pts	Qualification
1	FC Babylon X	16	14	1	1	53	13	+40	43	Promoted
2	HooGee 4	16	13	3	0	39	12	+27	42	Promoted
3	FC W	16	8	2	6	26	19	+7	26	
4	Kilo IF 1	16	7	2	7	19	21	−2	23	
5	OT-77 Aarni United	16	6	4	6	32	17	+15	22	
6	Tikka -88	16	5	1	10	13	31	−18	16	
7	Honka Ajax	16	3	4	9	21	35	−14	13	
8	EPS RPS	16	4	1	11	14	35	−21	13	
9	TaPo	16	3	0	13	17	51	−34	9	

Source: SPL Uusimaa

==== Section 3 ====
Pos	Team	Pld	W	D	L	GF	GA	GD	Pts	Promotion
1	OT-77 FC Puhallin	16	12	4	0	41	10	+31	40	Promoted
2	EHawks	16	11	1	4	50	14	+36	34	Promoted
3	FC Babylon Z	16	8	5	3	28	14	+14	29	
4	RiRa Ug 09	16	7	6	3	31	16	+15	27	
5	HC - MD	16	6	4	6	21	22	−1	22	
6	KAKE	16	4	3	9	13	38	−25	15	
7	Kilo IF 2	16	3	5	8	14	29	−15	14	
8	FC Karzinkarjut	16	3	1	12	16	49	−33	10	
9	AP	16	1	5	10	8	30	−22	8	

Source: SPL Uusimaa

==== Section 4 ====
Pos	Team	Pld	W	D	L	GF	GA	GD	Pts	Promotion
1	FC Vantaa	16	10	4	2	33	12	+21	34	Promoted
2	FC Insiders	16	9	3	4	40	18	+22	30	Promoted
3	Kilo IF 4	16	8	5	3	29	15	+14	29	
4	VJS 2	16	6	4	6	22	27	−5	22	
5	RiRa Ug	16	4	8	4	29	21	+8	20	
6	TJK	16	5	4	7	21	32	−11	19	
7	HäPS	16	4	4	8	15	31	−16	16	
8	Kilo IF 5	16	3	5	8	22	34	−12	14	
9	Buster	16	2	5	9	9	30	−21	11	

Source: SPL Uusimaa

==== Section 5 ====
Pos	Team	Pld	W	D	L	GF	GA	GD	Pts	Promotion
1	KP-75 Kyytipojat	18	15	0	3	48	12	+36	45	Promoted
2	IVU Skoobarit	18	13	2	3	41	22	+19	41	
3	KOPSE 3	18	11	1	6	34	30	+4	34	
4	I-HK M09	18	11	1	6	41	19	+22	34	
5	NouLa Huilii	18	11	0	7	43	31	+12	33	
6	RT-88	18	7	3	8	28	30	−2	24	
7	DT-65	18	6	2	10	27	36	−9	20	
8	FC Insiders Sekunda Utd	18	4	2	12	21	46	−25	14	
9	PuPo	18	2	4	12	11	37	−26	10	
10	KesPa	18	2	1	15	17	48	−31	7	

Source: SPL Uusimaa

==== Section 6 ====
Pos	Team	Pld	W	D	L	GF	GA	GD	Pts	Promotion
1	KOPSE 2	16	10	5	1	33	11	+22	35	Promoted
2	Orient U	16	11	2	3	41	8	+33	35	Promoted
3	AC JazzPa	16	7	4	5	32	20	+12	25	
4	TuPS 2	16	7	3	6	25	22	+3	24	
5	NouLa AiVa	16	7	2	7	24	28	−4	23	
6	Futura 2	16	5	6	5	29	26	+3	21	
7	KoPa	16	5	3	8	18	25	−7	18	
8	TräFK	16	5	2	9	22	46	−24	17	
9	KP-75 2	16	1	1	14	11	49	−38	4	

Source: SPL Uusimaa

==== Section 7 ====
Pos	Team	Pld	W	D	L	GF	GA	GD	Pts	Promotion
1	FC Loviisa	16	13	2	1	63	8	+55	41	Promoted
2	Lahen Pojat JS	16	13	2	1	49	9	+40	41	Promoted
3	JoKi	16	13	1	2	49	9	+40	40	
4	Pelikaani	16	7	0	9	23	35	−12	21	
5	AskU	16	5	1	10	18	32	−14	16	
6	MyMy	16	5	1	10	26	58	−32	16	
7	Ares-86	16	4	3	9	19	33	−14	15	
8	RIlves 3	16	3	2	11	13	43	−30	11	
9	HaNa FC	16	1	4	11	11	44	−33	7	

Source: SPL Uusimaa

=== South-East Finland (Kaakkois-Suomi) ===
==== South Section ====
Pos	Team	Pld	W	D	L	GF	GA	GD	Pts	Promotion
1	FC Kausala	12	9	1	2	42	13	+29	28	Promoted
2	SKT-Futis	12	8	2	2	30	13	+17	26	
3	VoPpK/2	12	8	0	4	44	16	+28	24	
4	Kajastus	12	5	2	5	41	22	+19	17	
5	JaVo	12	4	0	8	24	45	−21	12	
6	Karpo	12	3	1	8	14	31	−17	10	
7	FC Etapo	12	2	0	10	12	67	−55	6	

Source: / SPL Kaakkois-Suomi

==== North Section ====
Pos	Team	Pld	W	D	L	GF	GA	GD	Pts	Promotion
1	LaPe	12	8	3	1	25	13	+12	27	Promoted
2	RiPa/2	12	6	3	3	31	19	+12	21	
3	MäJä	12	6	2	4	24	18	+6	20	
4	StU	12	6	1	5	38	25	+13	19	
5	PePo	12	4	2	6	21	35	−14	14	
6	LuPo	12	4	1	7	24	31	−7	13	
7	Liry	12	1	2	9	14	36	−22	5	

Source: / SPL Kaakkois-Suomi

=== Northern Finland (Pohjois-Suomi) ===
==== Oulu ====
Pos	Team	Pld	W	D	L	GF	GA	GD	Pts	Promotion
1	PaTe 2	15	13	2	0	52	10	+42	41	Promoted
2	OuJK 2	15	8	2	5	46	23	+23	26	
3	KiiRi	15	5	5	5	31	33	−2	20	
4	OLS A2	15	5	5	5	35	41	−6	20	
5	IVFC	15	4	3	8	21	38	−17	15	
6	FC Suola	15	1	1	13	19	59	−40	4	

Source: SPL Pohjois-Suomi

=== Central Ostrobothnia (Keski-Pohjanmaa) ===
==== Section A ====
Pos	Team	Pld	W	D	L	GF	GA	GD	Pts	Promotion
1	MunU	14	11	0	3	55	20	+35	33	Promoted
2	FF Kickers	14	6	4	4	36	24	+12	22	
3	FC Konsta	14	5	5	4	34	27	+7	20	
4	KUF	14	6	1	7	28	33	−5	19	
5	Oldboys	14	6	1	7	37	39	−2	19	
6	FoBK	14	6	0	8	22	33	−11	18	
7	PeFF II	14	5	2	7	34	34	0	17	
8	Väsymättömät	14	4	1	9	25	61	−36	13	

Source: SPL Keski-Pohjanmaa

==== Section B ====
Pos	Team	Pld	W	D	L	GF	GA	GD	Pts	Promotion
1	FC YPA III	14	11	2	1	69	24	+45	35	Promoted
2	Tarmo	14	10	1	3	37	19	+18	31	
3	Öja-73 II	14	8	4	2	38	17	+21	28	
4	Ura	14	6	2	6	49	40	+9	20	
5	GBK III	14	5	4	5	35	31	+4	19	
6	HBK II	14	5	0	9	38	47	−9	15	
7	KP-87	14	2	1	11	17	63	−46	7	
8	FC-92	14	2	0	12	29	71	−42	6	

Source: SPL Keski-Pohjanmaa

=== Vaasa ===
==== Section 1 ====
Pos	Team	Pld	W	D	L	GF	GA	GD	Pts	Promotion
1	ABC Oldboys	16	12	2	2	54	19	+35	38	Promoted
2	FC Sport	16	12	2	2	48	19	+29	38	
3	Black Islanders	16	8	3	5	53	36	+17	27	
4	Sporting /2	16	8	3	5	56	33	+23	27	
5	BK-48	16	6	6	4	39	36	+3	24	
6	KaNsU	16	7	2	7	39	35	+4	23	
7	Ruutupaidat	16	5	0	11	38	81	−43	15	
8	FC Kiisto Young Boys	16	2	3	11	20	45	−25	9	
9	Töjby FC	16	1	1	14	27	70	−43	4	

Source: SPL Vaasa

==== Section 2 ====
Pos	Team	Pld	W	D	L	GF	GA	GD	Pts	Promotion
1	SuSi/2	16	16	0	0	85	17	+68	48	Promoted
2	KuRy	16	8	3	5	60	49	+11	27	
3	FC Korsholm/3	16	8	1	7	36	32	+4	25	
4	VäVi/2	16	8	0	8	40	45	−5	24	
5	Jurva-70	16	6	2	8	40	41	−1	20	
6	Malax IF /2	16	6	1	9	31	47	−16	19	
7	KoFF-PeIK/2	16	6	0	10	34	57	−23	18	
8	I-JBK	16	5	2	9	32	50	−18	17	
9	FC Jukola	16	3	3	10	28	48	−20	12	

Source: SPL Vaasa

==== Section 3 ====
Pos	Team	Pld	W	D	L	GF	GA	GD	Pts
1	Virkiä/2	14	14	0	0	81	16	+65	42
2	Sepsi-78	14	10	2	2	65	21	+44	32
3	LeJy	14	9	1	4	60	32	+28	28
4	HyMy	14	6	2	6	29	29	0	20
5	Ponnistus /2	14	4	4	6	39	45	−6	16
6	SoPS	14	4	1	9	28	47	−19	13
7	IK/2	14	3	0	11	23	56	−33	9
8	Jalas	14	1	0	13	19	98	−79	3

Source: SPL Vaasa

=== Tampere ===
==== Section 1 ====
Pos	Team	Pld	W	D	L	GF	GA	GD	Pts	Promotion
1	Loiske/2	16	11	2	3	56	29	+27	35	Promoted
2	IPa	16	10	3	3	43	28	+15	33	
3	Pato/2	16	9	5	2	56	20	+36	32	
4	HärmäKäpy	16	7	4	5	38	36	+2	25	
5	ParVi/2	16	5	7	4	40	28	+12	22	
6	ViiPV/2	16	6	3	7	29	32	−3	21	
7	FC Loppi	16	4	4	8	37	48	−11	16	
8	Jags/2	16	3	1	12	25	52	−27	10	
9	LeTo	16	1	3	12	20	71	−51	6	

Source: / SPL Tampere

==== Section 2 ====
Pos	Team	Pld	W	D	L	GF	GA	GD	Pts	Promotion
1	TaPa/2	18	12	4	2	59	20	+39	40	
2	PiPo-79	18	12	3	3	56	24	+32	39	Promoted
3	PJK/3	18	11	5	2	65	30	+35	38	
4	AS-Team	18	10	4	4	62	38	+24	34	
5	TahVe	18	8	1	9	32	40	−8	25	
6	FC Futarit	18	7	3	8	25	37	−12	24	
7	AC DARRA	18	7	1	10	33	44	−11	22	
8	FC Polla	18	4	3	11	39	62	−23	15	
9	FC LaKu	18	3	2	13	23	57	−34	11	
10	FC Potku	18	2	2	14	28	70	−42	8	

Source: / SPL Tampere

==== Section 3 ====
Pos	Team	Pld	W	D	L	GF	GA	GD	Pts	Promotion
1	Soho SS	18	12	4	2	40	11	+29	40	Promoted
2	HirPy	18	12	3	3	52	19	+33	39	
3	FC Tribe/2	18	12	0	6	46	37	+9	36	
4	VilTe	18	10	4	4	51	31	+20	34	
5	FC Trompi	18	9	3	6	49	34	+15	30	
6	FC Voltti	18	6	5	7	42	37	+5	23	
7	Apassit/2	18	5	1	12	26	55	−29	16	
8	YlöR/2	18	3	6	9	25	51	−26	15	
9	NoPS/2	18	4	1	13	36	56	−20	13	
10	IkU	18	2	3	13	16	52	−36	9	

Source: / SPL Tampere

=== Turku ===
==== Section 1 ====
Pos	Team	Pld	W	D	L	GF	GA	GD	Pts	Qualification
1	FC KyPS	9	9	0	0	33	8	+25	27	Upper Section
2	TPK 3	9	6	2	1	26	6	+20	20	Upper Section
3	TuWe II	9	6	1	2	22	10	+12	19	Upper Section
4	AU	9	5	0	4	28	26	+2	15	Middle Section
5	OU	9	4	1	4	17	18	−1	13	Middle Section
6	FC Tykit	9	3	2	4	14	18	−4	11	Middle Section
7	SoVo 2	9	2	3	4	17	17	0	9	Lower Section
8	LoPS	9	2	1	6	11	32	−21	7	Lower Section
9	Lieto 3	9	1	1	7	11	29	−18	4	Lower Section
10	Pamaus	9	0	3	6	14	29	−15	3	Lower Section

Source: SPL Turku

==== Section 2 ====
Pos	Team	Pld	W	D	L	GF	GA	GD	Pts	Qualification
1	Hot Lips	10	8	1	1	34	13	+21	25	Upper Section
2	MaPS	10	6	4	0	34	9	+25	22	Upper Section
3	TuTo 2	10	6	3	1	29	13	+16	21	
4	CELT'S	10	5	3	2	18	6	+12	18	Upper Section
5	FC Dynamo	10	5	0	5	17	19	−2	15	Middle Section
6	FC Koivu	10	3	4	3	20	19	+1	13	Middle Section
7	Rai-Fu	10	3	2	5	15	27	−12	11	Middle Section
8	Functio Laesa	10	3	1	6	16	23	−7	10	Lower Section
9	TuHa	10	2	1	7	15	36	−21	7	Lower Section
10	SC Stix	10	1	3	6	8	30	−22	6	Lower Section
11	SC Hornets	10	2	0	8	20	31	−11	6	Lower Section

Source: SPL Turku

==== Section 3 ====
Pos	Team	Pld	W	D	L	GF	GA	GD	Pts	Qualification
1	ÅIFK 2	9	8	0	1	39	14	+25	24	Upper Section
2	Atletico Ispoinen	9	6	0	3	26	15	+11	18	Upper Section
3	Heitto	9	5	2	2	22	15	+7	17	Upper Section
4	LTU 3	9	5	1	3	23	13	+10	16	Middle Section
5	Torre Calcio	9	5	1	3	20	13	+7	16	Middle Section
6	KuuLa	9	4	1	4	12	18	−6	13	Middle Section
7	PiPS 2	9	3	1	5	27	30	−3	10	Middle Section
8	SaPeLi	9	3	1	5	12	24	−12	10	Lower Section
9	KSF	9	2	1	6	6	24	−18	7	Lower Section
10	Wilpas 3	9	0	0	9	10	31	−21	0	Lower Section

Source: SPL Turku

==== Upper Section ====
Pos	Team	Pld	W	D	L	GF	GA	GD	Pts	Promotion
1	Atletico Ispoinen	8	5	3	0	25	11	+14	18	Promoted
2	ÅIFK 2	8	5	2	1	22	10	+12	17	Promoted
3	Hot Lips	8	5	2	1	37	15	+22	17	Promoted
4	MaPS	8	4	3	1	27	14	+13	15	Promoted
5	TuWe II	8	2	2	4	19	32	−13	8	
6	Heitto	8	2	2	4	22	15	+7	8	
7	FC KyPS	8	2	1	5	12	29	−17	7	
8	TPK 3	8	2	0	6	12	29	−17	6	
9	CELT'S	8	1	1	6	7	28	−21	4	

Source: SPL Turku

==== Middle Section ====
Pos	Team	Pld	W	D	L	GF	GA	GD	Pts
1	Torre Calcio	9	6	2	1	28	14	+14	20
2	FC Koivu	9	5	2	2	23	19	+4	17
3	KuuLa	9	5	2	2	14	11	+3	17
4	LTU 3	9	5	1	3	23	10	+13	16
5	AU	9	5	1	3	23	19	+4	16
6	PiPS 2	9	4	3	2	28	21	+7	15
7	FC Dynamo	9	3	0	6	19	21	−2	9
8	FC Tykit	9	2	2	5	22	28	−6	8
9	OU	8	2	0	6	12	26	−14	6
10	Rai-Fu	8	0	1	7	8	31	−23	1

Source: SPL Turku

==== Lower Section ====
Pos	Team	Pld	W	D	L	GF	GA	GD	Pts
1	KSF	10	7	3	0	33	11	+22	24
2	Wilpas 3	10	6	3	1	26	19	+7	21
3	Pamaus	10	6	2	2	27	21	+6	20
4	Functio Laesa	10	5	0	5	20	17	+3	15
5	SoVo 2	10	4	1	5	25	16	+9	13
6	SC Hornets	10	3	4	3	23	20	+3	13
7	LoPS	10	3	2	5	27	28	−1	11
8	TuHa	10	3	2	5	24	36	−12	11
9	SaPeLi	10	3	1	6	21	24	−3	10
10	Lieto 3	10	3	1	6	18	41	−23	10
11	SC Stix	10	0	5	5	8	19	−11	5

Source: SPL Turku

== References and sources ==
- Finnish FA
- ResultCode
- Kutonen (in Finnish)
