= Järvenpää (surname) =

Järvenpää is a Finnish surname. Notable people with the surname include:

- Anni Järvenpää (born 2000), Finnish figure skater
- Hannu Järvenpää (born 1963), Finnish ice hockey player and coach
- Juha Järvenpää (born 1989), Finnish ice hockey player
- Maarit Järvenpää, Finnish mathematician
- Sakke Järvenpää, singer of the Finnish band Leningrad Cowboys
- Tero Järvenpää (born 1984), Finnish javelin thrower
