= Järvenpää Plus =

Finnish political party

Järvenpää Plus is a local political party in the municipality of Järvenpää, Finland. It was founded as Järvenpää 2000, but changed its name to Järvenpää 2000+, and in the beginning of 2012, changed its name to "Järvenpää Plus". It first participated in the municipal elections in 1988 together with Greens and unaligned candidates. In the 2004 municipal elections the party got 2186 votes (14.2%). It won seven seats in the municipal council. Its most popular candidate was Rauha-Maria Mertjärvi, who got 520 personal preference votes.
