= Järvenpää =

Town in Uusimaa, Finland

Järvenpää Träskända
- Municipality and town
- Järvenpään kaupunki Träskända stad
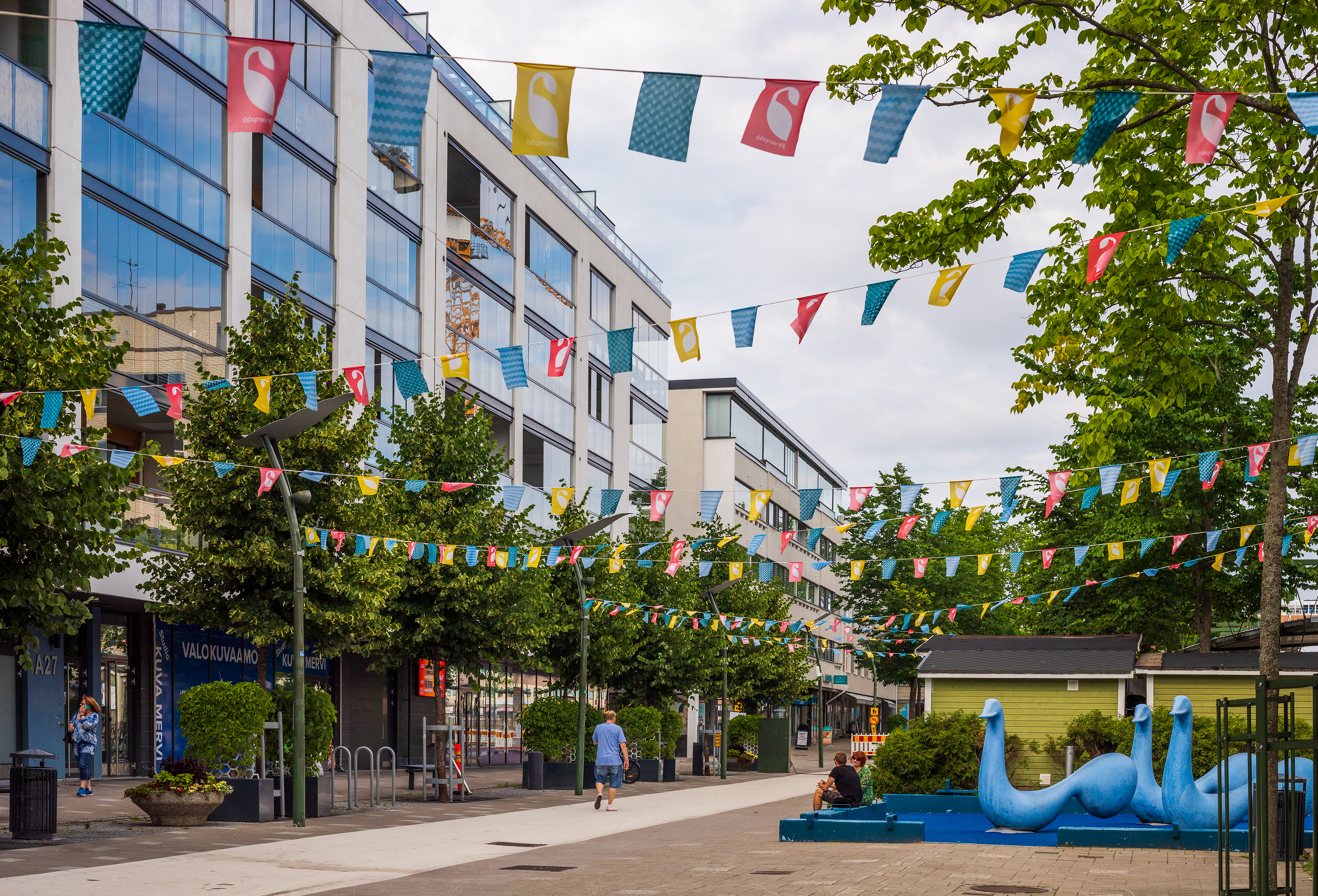
- Sibeliuksenkatu (Sibelius' street)

- Coat of arms

- Location of Järvenpää in Finland
- Interactive map of Järvenpää
- Coordinates: 60°28.5′N 025°05.5′E
- Country: Finland
- Region: Uusimaa
- Sub-region: Helsinki sub-region
- Metropolitan area: Helsinki metropolitan area
- Charter: 1951
- City rights: 1967

Government
  - Town manager: Iiris Laukkanen

Area (2018-01-01)
  - Total: 39.93 km^{2} (15.42 sq mi)
  - Land: 37.54 km^{2} (14.49 sq mi)
  - Water: 2.39 km^{2} (0.92 sq mi)
  - Rank: 307th largest in Finland

Population (2025-12-31)
  - Total: 46,944
  - Rank: 24th largest in Finland
  - Density: 1,250.51/km^{2} (3,238.8/sq mi)

Population by native language
  - Finnish: 89% (official)
  - Swedish: 1%
  - Others: 9.9%

Population by age
  - 0 to 14: 16.8%
  - 15 to 64: 64.3%
  - 65 or older: 18.9%
- Time zone: UTC+02:00 (EET)
  - Summer (DST): UTC+03:00 (EEST)
- Climate: Dfb
- Website: www.jarvenpaa.fi/en

Järvenpää (Finnish: [ˈjærʋemˌpæː]; Swedish: Träskända, Finland Swedish: [ˈtreskenˌda]; lit. 'lake's end' (Note: The name of town both in Finnish and Swedish probably refers to its location at the "northern end of Lake Tuusula".)) is a town in Finland, located in the southern interior of the country. Järvenpää is situated in the centre of the Uusimaa region in the immediate vicinity of Lake Tuusula. The population of Järvenpää is approximately 47,000. It is the 24th most populous municipality in Finland. Järvenpää is part of the Helsinki Metropolitan Area, which has approximately 1.62 million inhabitants.

Järvenpää is located on the Helsinki-Riihimäki railway line in the Uusimaa region, about 37 kilometres (23 mi) north of Helsinki. Neighbouring municipalities are Tuusula, Sipoo and Mäntsälä. People also refer to Kerava as Järvenpää's neighbour, although technically they do not share a border due to the one kilometre-wide strip of land that belongs to Tuusula.

== History ==
The first documented mention of the village of Järvenpää is found in a tax list from 1540, where it is named in Swedish as Treskendaby; starting from the next decade, its Finnish name was used in parallel, in forms such as Jerffuepä or Järuenpää. Around this time, the village was documented to consist of eight estates. Prior to being transferred to the newly formed chapel of Tuusula in 1643, Järvenpää was part of the parish of Sipoo; Tuusula, in turn, became an independent pastorate (kirkkoherrakunta) in 1654.

While the population in Järvenpää had long been stagnant, it had started expanding again by the late 1700s, thanks to the evolution of agriculture at the time. In the middle of the 1800s, Järvenpää together with Nummenkylä formed the most populous village of Tuusula with around 450 inhabitants. Thanks to its location on the road between Helsinki and Mäntsälä, the village had grown into a minor concentration of commerce, with the presence of a kestikievari - a type of tavern - and several craftsmen. Thanks to these factors, one of the original intermediate stations of the Helsinki–Riihimäki railway was placed in Järvenpää.

Järvenpää was separated from its parent community Tuusula in 1951. Järvenpää was granted the status of a market town (kauppala) after the separation. Neighbouring districts Kellokoski and Nummenkylä were not added to the municipality of Järvenpää, and controversy over this decision exists to this day. In the event, Kellokoski remained part of the municipality of Tuusula. Bjarne Westermarck developed Järvenpää and is considered to be the founder of the town and was honored at its centennial celebrations by the release of a book about Järvenpää. Järvenpää was granted full legal town (kaupunki) status in 1967.

== Geography ==
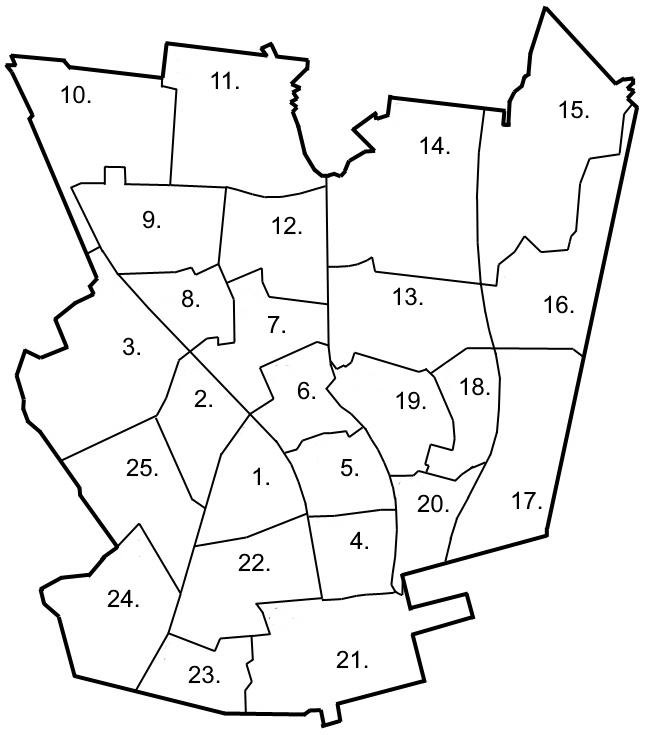
The neighbourhoods of Järvenpää

Järvenpää is divided into 25 neighbourhoods. The locations of individual neighbourhoods are shown on the map on the left.

1. Keskus
2. Loutti
3. Saunakallio
4. Kyrölä
5. Kinnari
6. Pöytäalho
7. Pajala
8. Sorto
9. Jamppa
10. Wärtsilä
11. Nummenkylä
12. Peltola
13. Isokytö
14. Pietilä
15. Haarajoki
16. Mylly
17. Mikonkorpi
18. Satumetsä
19. Terhola
20. Satukallio
21. Ristinummi
22. Lepola
23. Terioja
24. Vanhakylä
25. Kaakkola

== Demographics ==
Historical population
Year	Pop.	±%
1950	8,069	—
1960	12,225	+51.5%
1970	16,259	+33.0%
1980	23,281	+43.2%
1990	31,525	+35.4%
2000	35,915	+13.9%
2010	38,680	+7.7%
2020	44,455	+14.9%
Source: Doria, Statistics Finland

The city of Järvenpää has 46,944 inhabitants, making it the 24th most populous municipality in Finland. The city of Järvenpää is part of the Helsinki metropolitan area, which is the largest urban area in Finland with 1,623,283 inhabitants.

In 2020, 16.8% of the population of Järvenpää was under the age of 15, 64.3% were aged 15 to 64, and 18.9% were over the age of 65. In 2019, out of the total population of 43,711, the entire urban population of Järvenpää was localized in a single urban area. Only 42 people lived in sparsely populated areas, while the coordinates of 729 people were unknown. This made Järvenpää's degree of urbanization 99.9%.

=== Languages ===
Population by
mother tongue (2025)
1. Finnish (89.0%)
2. Russian (1.50%)
3. Ukrainian (1.40%)
4. Estonian (1.40%)
5. Swedish (1.00%)
6. Arabic (0.50%)
7. Persian (0.50%)
8. Other (4.70%)

Järvenpää is a monolingual Finnish-speaking municipality. The majority of the population, 41,793 persons (89%), spoke Finnish as their first language. In addition, the number of Swedish speakers was 486 persons (1%) of the population. Foreign languages were spoken by 9.9% of the population. As English and Swedish are compulsory school subjects, functional bilingualism or trilingualism acquired through language studies is not uncommon.

At least 30 different languages are spoken in Järvenpää. The most common foreign languages are Russian (1.5%), Ukrainian (1.4%), Estonian (1.4%) and Arabic (0.5%).

=== Immigration ===
Population by country of birth (2025)
Country of birth	Population	%
Finland	42,484	90.5
Soviet Union	772	1.6
Estonia	595	1.3
Ukraine	359	0.8
Sweden	180	0.4
Afghanistan	139	0.3
Thailand	121	0.3
Russia	108	0.2
Myanmar	107	0.2
Turkey	104	0.2
Other	1,975	4.2

As of 2024, there were 4,506 persons with a foreign background living in Järvenpää, or 9% of the population. (Note: Statistics Finland classifies a person as having a "foreign background" if both parents or the only known parent were born abroad.) The number of residents who were born abroad was 4,275, or 9% of the population. The number of persons with foreign citizenship living in Järvenpää was 3,125. Most foreign-born citizens came from the former Soviet Union, Estonia, Ukraine and Sweden.

The relative share of immigrants in Järvenpää's population is below the national average.

=== Religion ===
In 2023, the Evangelical Lutheran Church was the largest religious group with 59.7% of the population of Järvenpää. Other religious groups accounted for 3.1% of the population. 37.2% of the population had no religious affiliation.

== Culture ==
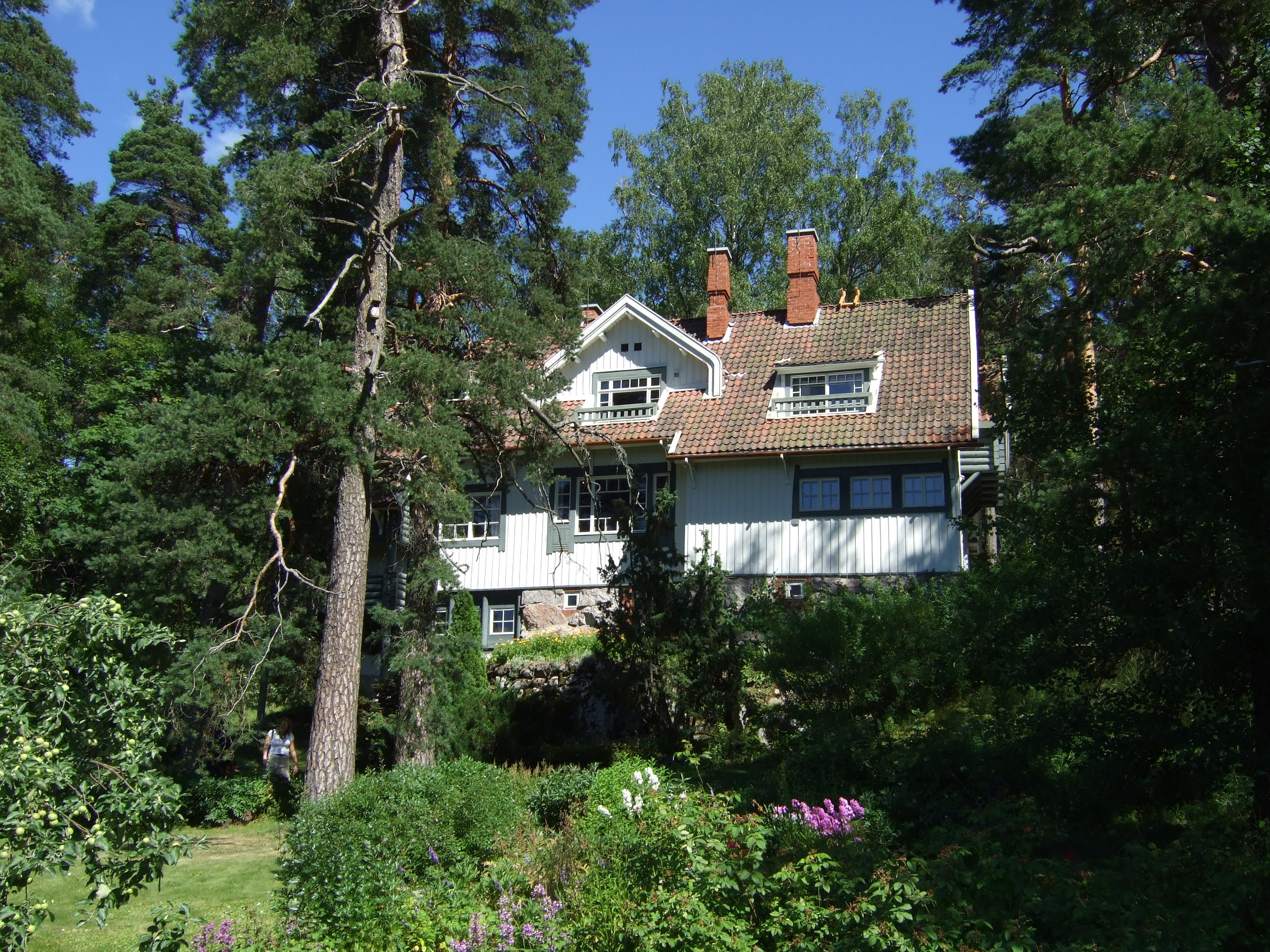
Ainola

In the early 20th century Järvenpää had a large artist community, including Jean Sibelius, Juhani Aho and Eero Järnefelt. This was partly because of a railway connection to Helsinki.

Järvenpää is widely known as the location of Ainola, the home of the composer Jean Sibelius and his wife Aino (née Järnefelt). It is situated about two kilometers south of the city centre. The composer moved with his family to the cottage designed by Lars Sonck on September 24, 1904, and he lived there until his death in 1957. Ainola is open for visitors in the summer months as the "museum of Sibelius".

Juhani Aho moved with his wife Venny Soldan-Brofeldt to Järvenpää in 1897. They lived there for fourteen years in a villa, called Vårbacka, next to the shore of Lake Tuusula. The villa was later called Ahola.

The K-Citymarket of Järvenpää was awarded the Grocery Store of the Year title in 2019 by the IGD of the United Kingdom.

=== Events ===
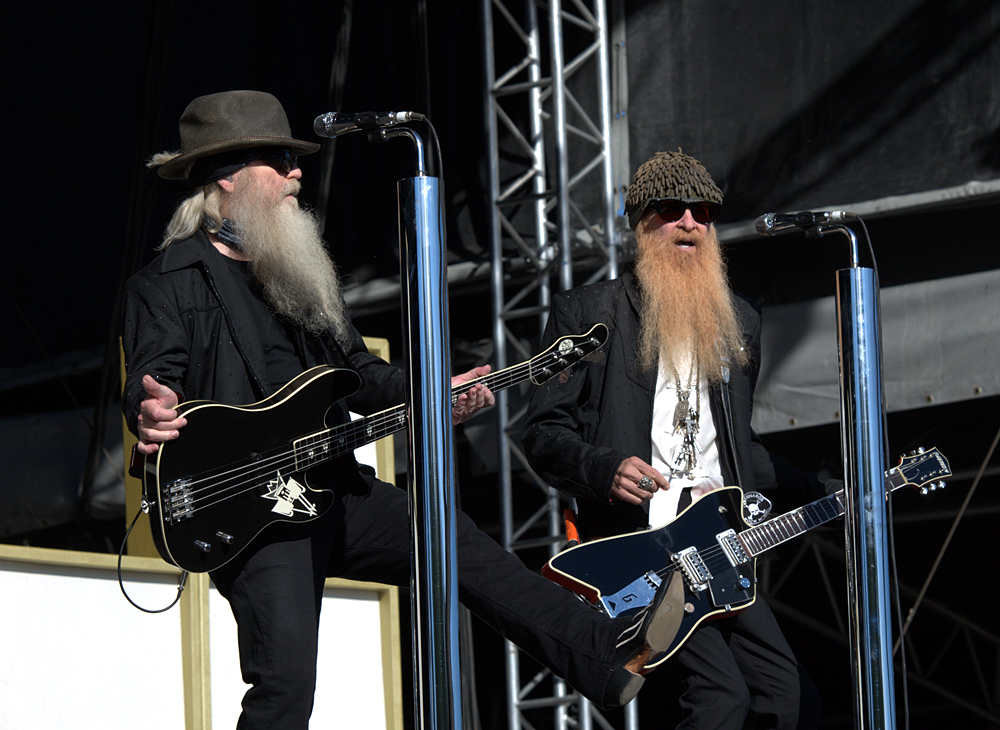
ZZ Top performing at Puistoblues in 2010

Events are held in the Järvenpää-talo (lit. Järvenpää-house) throughout the year: concerts, theatre and art-shows. The favorite-place of children is Pikku-Aino's home, where children can play, make shows and so on.

There is a musical event, which is arranged every year, called Puistoblues (lit. Park Blues). "Blues-week" starts from the "Blues street" of the city centre, and concerts and informal sessions are arranged in bars and restaurants. The main concert is at the end of Blues-week, and is arranged in Vanhankylänniemi on the Saturday.

Järvenpää celebrates its 70th anniversary in 2021.

== Transportation ==
The railroad goes through the city centre. In addition to the main railway station, there are the stations of Ainola, Saunakallio and Haarajoki.

The trip to Helsinki takes about half an hour, whether by rail or road, and to the airport of Helsinki-Vantaa about 20 minutes. Train connections to the capital are good. Uusimaa's trains leave the main station twice an hour, and from other stations once an hour.

== Politics ==
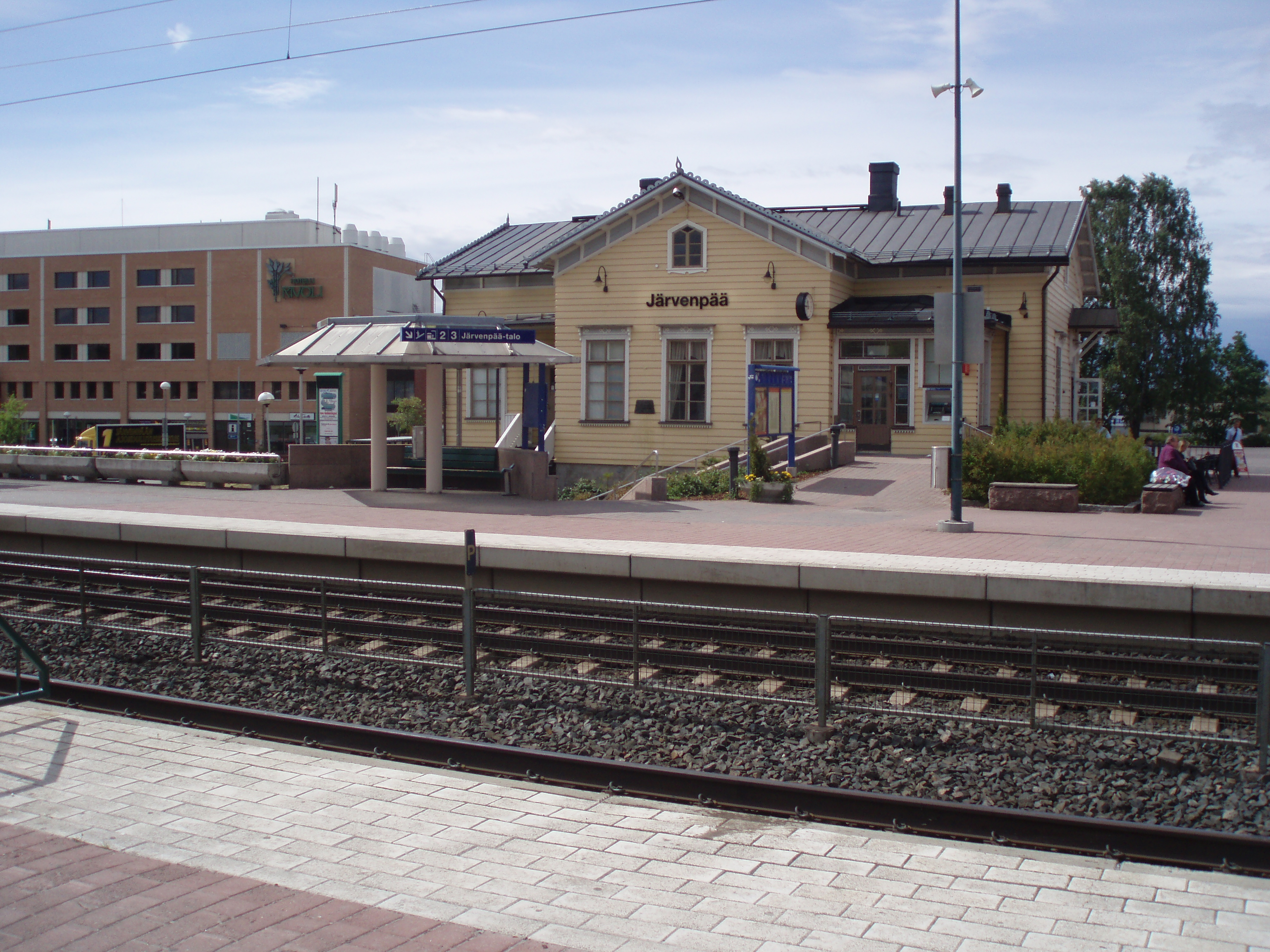
Järvenpää railway station

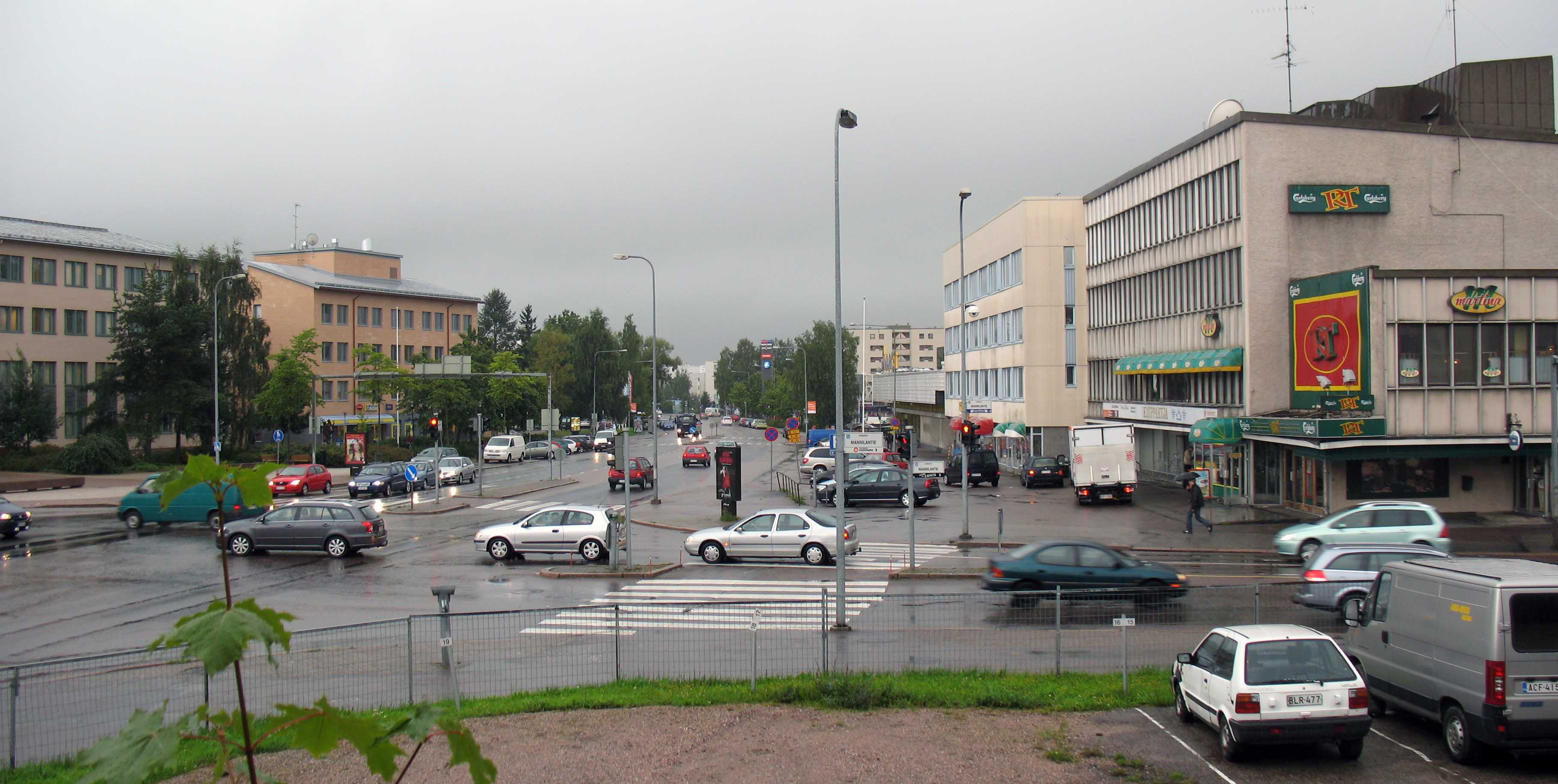
Helsingintie

Results of the 2021 Finnish municipal elections in Järvenpää:

- Social Democratic Party: 21.1%
- National Coalition Party: 20.5%
- True Finns: 18.3%
- Green League: 13.2%
- Järvenpää Plus: 9,1%
- Centre Party: 7.5%
- Left Alliance: 5.2%
- Christian Democrats: 3,1%

== Management ==
Järvenpää belongs to Uudenmaan vaalipiiri (electoral district of Uusimaa) and its town council has 51 councillors. The town council's political groups (2004–2008) were :

- Suomen Sosialidemokraattinen Puolue (The Social Democratic Party of Finland) (14 councillors),
- Kokoomus (The National Coalition Party) (13),
- Järvenpää 2000 Plus (7),
- Keskusta (The Centre Party) (7),
- Vihreä liitto (The Green League) (4),
- Vasemmistoliitto (The Left Alliance) (3),
- Kristillisdemokraatit (Christian Democrats) (1),
- Suomen kommunistinen puolue (Communist Party of Finland) (1),
- Liberaalit (Liberals) (1).

The president of the council was Ari Åberg (Kokoomus).

== International relations ==
=== Twin towns — Sister cities ===
Järvenpää is twinned with:

- Buchholz in der Nordheide, Germany
- Jõgeva County, Estonia
- Lørenskog, Norway
- Pasadena, United States
- Rødovre, Denmark
- Täby, Sweden
- Vác, Hungary
- Volkhov, Russia

== See also ==
- Kellokoski
- Kerava
- Lake Tuusula
- Pornainen
