= Performance record of clubs in the Superpesis =

Since inception in 1990 there have been 31 clubs who have played in Finland's Superpesis. Nine clubs have won the Superpesis: Sotkamon Jymy (19 times), Vimpelin Veto (4 times), Kiteen Pallo -90 (3 times), Joensuun Maila (2 times), Oulun Lippo (2 times), Hyvinkään Tahko (once) Imatran Pallo-Veikot (once) Manse PP (once) and Pattijoen Urheilijat (once)

== Record of finishing positions of clubs in the Superpesis ==
Table correct as at the end of the 2023 Superpesis season.

=== Men's Superpesis ===
Club	Best result	90	91	92	93	94	95	96	97	98	99	00	01	02	03	04	05	06	07	08	09	10	11	12	13	14	15	16	17	18	19	20	21	22	23	24
**Sotkamon Jymy**	1st (x19)	**1**	2	**1**	**1**	3	**1**	**1**	**1**	4	5	2	**1**	**1**	**1**	**1**	3	**1**	2	2	**1**	3	**1**	**1**	**1**	**1**	**1**	2	2	4	2	**1**	4	5	**1**	
**Vimpelin Veto**	1st (x4)	6	6	8	12	11	11	13	15	•	•	•	•	•	•	9	10	10	5	8	3	**1**	2	2	2	2	2	**1**	**1**	3	4	3	3	**1**	2	
**Kiteen Pallo -90**	1st (x3)	12	5	9	11	5	5	5	2	3	**1**	**1**	2	5	9	2	**1**	4	10	9	5	8	8	7	6	8	10	8	7	8	8	5	11	8	7	
**Joensuun Maila**	1st (x2)	•	•	•	•	•	•	•	•	•	•	•	•	•	•	11	7	9	8	5	9	11	11	4	3	3	3	3	3	**1**	**1**	4	5	3	6	
Oulun Lippo	1st (x2)	9	9	4	3	**1**	2	6	6	**1**	7	3	7	9	8	7	5	8	12	6	7	4	•	•	•	•	•	5	12	14	•	•	•	•	•	
**Hyvinkään Tahko**	1st	3	4	2	5	2	4	2	4	9	2	4	4	3	5	4	4	7	**1**	7	8	5	7	6	5	4	7	7	8	11	5	6	9	4	9	
**Imatran Pallo-Veikot**	1st	2	**1**	5	2	7	10	14	•	•	•	10	9	10	12	•	•	11	•	•	•	•	•	•	•	•	•	•	9	9	9	9	7	10	11	
**Manse PP**	1st	•	•	•	•	•	•	•	•	•	•	•	•	•	•	•	•	•	•	•	•	•	•	•	•	•	•	•	•	•	•	12	**1**	2	4	
**Pattijoen Urheilijat**	1st	•	•	•	•	10	12	•	10	7	4	5	3	2	4	10	6	2	7	**1**	4	6	3	3	4	6	8	12	10	7	7	8	8	11	10	
**Kouvolan Pallonlyöjät**	2nd (x5)	10	14	•	•	•	•	•	•	•	13	•	•	•	11	•	9	12	9	4	2	2	4	10	9	9	5	4	4	2	3	2	2	6	5	
Kaisaniemen Tiikerit	2nd	•	•	•	•	•	•	•	5	2	•	•	•	•	•	•	•	•	•	•	•	•	•	•	•	•	•	•	•	•	•	•	•	•	•	
Kinnarin Pesis	2nd	•	•	•	•	•	•	•	•	•	•	•	•	7	2	12.	•	•	•	•	•	•	•	•	•	•	•	•	•	•	•	•	•	•	•	
Nurmon Jymy	2nd	•	•	•	•	•	•	•	•	•	•	•	•	•	•	5	2	5	4	3	10	10	9	11	•	•	•	•	•	•	•	•	•	•	•	
Seinäjoen Maila-Jussit	3rd (x5)	13	3	10	8	9	3	3	3	6	10	6	8	8	7	3	12	•	11	10	•	•	•	•	•	•	•	•	•	•	•	•	•	•	•	
Koskenkorvan Urheilijat	3rd (x2)	•	•	•	•	•	•	•	•	•	6	8	6	4	3	8	11	6	3	11	6	7	5	5	8	7	11	6	6	5	11	11	12	12	13	
**Alajärven Ankkurit**	3rd	5	7	3	4	4	6	11	11	10	9	12	11	•	•	•	•	•	•	•	•	•	•	12	12	10	6	14	11	12	14	•	•	•	12	
Jyväskylän Kiri	3rd	11	8	7	10	8	7	4	14	5	3	9	13	•	•	•	•	•	13	•	•	9	10	8	11	12	4	10	•	•	•	•	•	•	•	
**Kempeleen Kiri**	3rd	•	•	•	•	•	•	•	•	•	•	•	•	•	•	•	•	•	•	•	•	•	•	•	•	•	•	13	14	•	12	10	6	7	3	
Puijon Pesis	3rd	•	•	•	•	•	•	•	•	•	•	•	•	11	6	6	8	3	6	12	11	•	•	•	•	•	•	•	•	•	•	•	•	•	•	
Kankaanpään Maila	4th	4	10	6	9	13	13	•	•	8	8	13	10	12	•	•	•	•	•	•	•	•	6	9	10	11	12	11	13	10	10	13	13	13	•	
**Seinäjoen JymyJussit**	5th (x2)	•	•	•	•	•	•	•	•	•	•	•	•	•	•	•	•	•	•	•	•	•	•	•	7	5	9	9	5	6	6	7	10	9	8	
Ulvilan Pesä-Veikot	5th	•	•	•	•	•	•	•	•	•	11	7	5	6	10	•	•	•	•	•	•	12	•	•	•	•	•	•	•	•	•	•	•	•	•	
Loimaan Palloilijat	6th	14	•	11	7	6	8	7	7	13	•	11	12	•	•	•	•	•	•	•	•	•	•	•	•	•	•	•	•	•	•	•	•	•	•	
Riihimäen Pallonlyöjät	6th	•	•	13	6	12	14	•	•	•	•	•	•	•	•	•	•	•	•	•	•	•	•	•	•	•	•	•	•	•	•	•	•	•	•	
Vaasan Maila	7th	7	12	14	•	•	•	•	•	•	•	•	•	•	•	•	•	•	•	•	•	•	•	•	•	•	•	•	•	•	•	•	•	•	•	
Siilinjärven Pesis	8th (x3)	8	11	12	14	•	9	8	8	11	•	•	•	•	•	•	•	•	•	•	•	•	•	•	•	•	•	•	•	•	•	•	14	•	•	
**Haminan Palloilijat**	9th	•	•	•	•	•	•	12	9	12	12	14	14	•	•	•	•	•	•	•	•	•	•	•	•	•	•	•	•	13	•	•	15	•	•	
Juvan Pallo	9th	•	•	•	•	•	•	9	13	15	•	•	•	•	•	•	•	•	•	•	•	•	•	•	•	•	•	•	•	•	•	•	•	•	•	
Haapajärven Pesä-Kiilat	10th	•	•	•	•	•	•	10	12	14	•	•	•	•	•	•	•	•	•	•	•	•	•	•	•	•	•	•	•	•	•	•	•	•	•	
Mansen Pesäpallo	13th	•	13	•	•	•	•	•	•	•	•	•	•	•	•	•	•	•	•	•	•	•	•	•	•	•	•	•	•	•	•	•	•	•	•	
Muhoksen Pallo-Salamat	13th	•	•	•	13	14	•	•	•	•	•	•	•	•	•	•	•	•	•	•	•	•	•	•	•	•	•	•	•	•	•	•	•	•	•	

Team names in bold indicate the club is a current Superpesis member

	League champion
	Superpesis finalist
	Superpesis Bronze medalist
	Qualified for the playoffs
	Superpesis club
•	Absent from the list of clubs that participated in that season's Superpesis

=== Women's Superpesis ===
Club	Best result	90	91	92	93	94	95	96	97	98	99	00	01	02	03	04	05	06	07	08	09	10	11	12	13	14	15	16	17	18	19	20	21	22	23	24
**Kirittäret**	1st (x12)	•	•	•	•	•	•	•	•	•	5	8	2	2	**1**	2	**1**	**1**	**1**	**1**	**1**	**1**	2	2	3	2	2	**1**	5	**1**	**1**	**1**	2	**1**	5	
**Lapuan Virkiä**	1st (x9)	2	3	**1**	**1**	4	5	7	2	6	4	7	**1**	3	5	**1**	3	5	6	3	2	3	**1**	**1**	**1**	**1**	**1**	2	3	4	3	4	4	3	3	
**Pesäkarhut**	1st (x3)	•	•	•	12	•	•	9	4	7	6	6	3	**1**	6	3	2	3	4	2	3	2	3	3	2	3	4	3	2	3	2	3	**1**	4	**1**	
Jyväskylän Kiri	1st (x2)	4	5	6	5	5	3	**1**	**1**	3	•	•	•	•	•	•	•	•	•	•	•	•	•	•	•	•	•	•	•	•	•	•	•	•	•	
Oulun Lippo	1st (x2)	10	6	4	3	**1**	**1**	2	3	2	2	2	6	9	11	•	7	•	•	•	•	11	•	•	•	•	•	•	7	9	•	•	•	•	•	
Ikaalisten Tarmo	1st	3	**1**	5	8	8	9	12	•	•	•	•	•	•	•	•	•	•	•	•	•	•	•	•	•	•	•	•	•	•	•	•	•	•	•	
**Manse PP**	1st	•	•	•	•	•	•	•	•	•	•	•	•	•	•	•	•	•	•	•	•	•	•	•	•	•	•	5	**1**	2	4	2	3	2	2	
Pattijoen Urheilijat	1st	•	•	•	•	•	•	•	•	•	•	**1**	4	4	10	•	•	•	•	•	•	•	•	•	•	•	•	•	•	•	•	•	•	•	•	
Siilinjärven Pesis	1st	9	8	8	2	2	2	4	9	4	**1**	4	7	5	4	4	6	8	10	8	10	8	10	•	•	•	•	•	•	•	•	11	11	•	•	
Vihdin Pallo	1st	6	4	2	4	3	4	5	5	**1**	3	10	11	12	•	10	•	•	•	•	•	•	•	6	8	10	•	11	11	•	•	•	•	•	•	
Viinijärven Urheilijat	1st	**1**	2	3	6	6	6	3	7	5	9	12	•	•	•	•	•	•	9	11	7	9	5	4	11	6	8	10	•	•	•	•	•	•	•	
Lappeenrannan Pesä Ysit	2nd	•	•	•	•	•	12	•	•	•	•	•	•	8	7	7	4	2	3	5	6	4	4	5	4	9	9	8	9	8	9	10	12	•	•	
PeTo-Jussit	2nd	•	•	•	•	•	•	•	•	•	•	•	•	•	•	•	10	6	2	4	4	5	9	11	•	•	•	•	•	•	•	•	•	•	•	
Tyrnävän Tempaus	2nd	•	•	•	•	•	•	•	•	•	•	•	8	6	2	8	9	7	5	7	12	•	•	•	•	•	•	•	•	•	•	•	•	•	•	
Peräseinäjoen Toive	3rd (x2)	•	•	•	•	•	•	•	•	10	8	3	5	7	3	6	•	•	•	•	•	•	•	•	•	•	•	•	•	•	•	•	•	•	•	
**Fera**	3rd	•	•	•	•	•	•	•	•	•	11	•	•	10	8	5	5	6	7	6	8	7	7	7	6	5	3	4	6	5	7	8	8	6	7	
Kempeleen Kiri	4th (x2)	•	•	•	•	•	•	•	•	•	•	•	•	•	•	•	•	•	•	•	•	•	•	10	5	4	6	7	4	7	8	7	7	10	11	
**Seinäjoen Maila-Jussit**	4th	•	•	•	•	10	11	•	•	•	•	•	•	•	•	•	•	•	•	•	•	•	•	•	•	•	10	6	8	5	5	6	5	5	4	
**Hyvinkään Tahko**	5th	8	9	9	10	9	•	•	•	12	•	•	•	•	•	•	•	•	•	•	•	•	•	•	•	•	•	•	•	10	6	5	6	8	10	
Kajaanin Hymy	5th	•	•	•	•	•	•	•	•	•	7	5	9	•	•	•	•	•	•	•	•	•	•	•	•	•	•	•	•	•	•	•	•	•	•	
Kankaanpään Maila	5th	•	•	•	•	•	•	•	•	•	•	•	•	•	•	•	•	•	•	•	•	•	•	•	•	•	5	•	•	•	•	•	•	•	•	
Ulvilan Pesä-Veikot	5th	5	10	•	•	•	•	•	•	•	•	•	•	•	•	•	•	•	•	•	•	•	•	•	•	•	•	•	•	•	•	•	•	•	•	
Turku-Pesis	6th (x2)	•	•	•	11	10	10	10	•	•	•	•	•	•	•	•	•	•	•	10	9	6	6	9	10	•	•	•	•	•	•	•	•	•	•	
Ylihärmän Junkkarit	6th	•	•	10	9	7	7	6	•	•	•	•	•	•	•	•	•	•	•	•	•	•	•	•	•	•	•	•	•	•	•	•	•	•	•	
**Joensuun Maila**	6th	•	•	•	•	•	•	•	•	•	•	•	•	•	•	•	•	•	•	•	•	•	•	•	•	•	•	•	•	•	•	9	9	9	6	
Ylihärmän Pesis-Junkkarit	6th	•	•	•	•	•	•	•	6	11	•	•	•	•	•	9	8	10	8	9	11	10	8	8	•	•	•	•	•	•	•	•	•	•	•	
**Roihuttaret**	7th (x4)	7	7	7	7	12	8	8	10	•	•	•	•	•	•	•	•	•	•	•	•	•	•	•	12	11	•	•	•	•	•	•	10	11	12	
Mansen Räpsä	7th (x2)	•	•	•	•	•	•	•	•	•	•	•	•	•	•	•	•	•	•	•	•	•	•	•	9	7	7	•	•	•	•	•	•	•	•	
**Vaasan Mailattaret**	7th	•	•	•	•	•	•	•	•	•	•	•	•	•	•	•	•	•	•	•	•	•	•	•	•	•	•	•	•	•	•	•	•	7	8	
Vuokatin Veto	7th	•	•	•	•	•	•	•	•	•	•	•	•	•	•	•	•	•	•	•	•	•	•	•	7	8	•	•	•	•	•	•	•	•	•	
Mansen Pesäpallo	8th	12	•	12	•	•	•	11	8	9	10	11	12	•	•	•	•	•	•	•	•	•	•	•	•	•	•	•	•	•	•	•	•	•	•	
Vimpelin Veto	8th	•	•	•	•	•	•	•	•	8	11	9	10	11	•	•	•	•	•	•	•	•	•	•	•	•	•	•	•	•	•	•	•	•	•	
**Haminan Palloilijat**	9th (x2)	•	•	•	•	•	•	•	•	•	•	•	•	•	•	•	•	9	11	•	•	•	•	•	•	•	•	•	•	•	•	•	•	•	9	
Hämeenlinnan Paukku	9th	•	•	•	•	•	•	•	•	•	•	•	•	•	9	•	•	•	•	•	•	•	•	•	•	•	•	•	•	•	•	•	•	•	•	
Kajaanin Pallokerho	9th	•	•	•	•	•	•	•	•	•	•	•	•	•	•	•	•	•	•	•	•	•	•	•	•	•	•	9	10	•	•	•	•	•	•	
Mynämäen Vesa	10th	•	•	•	•	•	•	•	•	•	•	•	•	•	•	•	•	•	•	•	•	•	•	•	•	•	•	•	•	•	11	12	10	•	•	
Lappajärven Veikot	11th (x3)	•	•	•	•	•	•	•	•	•	•	•	•	•	•	•	•	•	•	•	•	•	•	•	•	•	•	•	11	11	11	•	•	•	•	
Vähänkyrön Viesti	11th (x3)	11	11	11	•	•	•	•	12	•	•	•	•	•	•	•	•	•	•	•	•	•	•	•	•	•	•	•	•	•	•	•	•	•	•	
Sotkamon Jymy	11th (x2)	•	•	•	•	•	•	•	•	•	•	•	•	•	•	•	11	11	•	•	•	•	•	•	•	•	•	•	•	•	•	•	•	•	•	
Aurajoen Maila	11th	•	•	•	•	•	•	•	11	•	•	•	•	•	•	•	•	•	•	•	•	•	•	•	•	•	•	•	•	•	•	•	•	•	•	
Jyväskylän Valo	12th	•	•	•	•	•	•	•	•	•	•	•	•	•	•	•	•	•	•	•	•	12	•	•	•	•	•	•	•	•	•	•	•	•	•	
Kokemäen Kova-Väki	12th	•	12	•	•	•	•	•	•	•	•	•	•	•	•	•	•	•	•	•	•	•	•	•	•	•	•	•	•	•	•	•	•	•	•	
**Pöytyän Urheilijat**	12th	•	•	•	•	•	•	•	•	•	•	•	•	•	•	•	•	•	•	•	•	•	•	•	•	•	•	•	•	•	•	•	•	12	•	

Team names in bold indicate the club is a current Superpesis member

	League champion
	Superpesis finalist
	Superpesis Bronze medalist
	Qualified for the playoffs
	Superpesis club
•	Absent from the list of clubs that participated in that season's Superpesis
