= Superpesis Manager of the Season =

- Awarded for: The most outstanding manager in each given Superpesis season
- Country: Finland
- Presented by: Superpesis
- First award: 1984
- Currently held by: (Finland) Mikko Kuosmanen (5th win)

Highlights
- Most awards: (Finland) Mikko Kuosmanen (5)
- Most consecutive wins: (Finland) Mikko Kuosmanen (3) (Finland) Olli Viljaranta (3) (Finland) Pekka Peltomäki (3)
- Most team wins: Sotkamon Jymy (9)
- Most consecutive team wins: Sotkamon Jymy (5)

The Superpesis Manager of the Season is an annual pesäpallo award presented to managers in Finland. It recognises the most outstanding manager in the Superpesis each season. The award was established during the 1984 season.

In 1984, the inaugural Manager of the Season award was given to Sotkamon Jymy manager Aulis Väisänen. The current holder of the award is Sotkamon Jymy manager Mikko Kuosmanen.

Four managers have won the award without winning the Superpesis trophy in the same season: Aulis Väisänen in 1984; Pekka Peltomäki in 1987; Olli Viljaranta in 2000 and Pasi Virtanen in 1996 and 2003.

== Winners ==
=== Men's Superpesis ===
Key
†	Denotes the club were not Superpesis champions in the same season

Winners of the Men's Superpesis Manager of the Season
Season	Manager	Club	Ref
1984	Aulis Väisänen (1)	Sotkamon Jymy^{†}	
1986	Vesa Lipsanen	Imatran Pallo-Veikot	
1987	Pekka Peltomäki (1)	Alajärven Ankkurit^{†}	
1988	Pekka Peltomäki (2)	Alajärven Ankkurit	
1989	Pekka Peltomäki (3)	Alajärven Ankkurit	
1990	Aulis Väisänen (2)	Sotkamon Jymy	
1991	Mikko Vitikainen	Imatran Pallo-Veikot	
1992	Juha Tanskanen (1)	Sotkamon Jymy	
1993	Juha Tanskanen (2)	Sotkamon Jymy	
1994	Mauri Pyhälahti	Oulun Lippo	
1995	Juha Tanskanen (3)	Sotkamon Jymy	
1996	Pasi Virtanen (1)	Hyvinkään Tahko^{†}	
1997	Juha Tanskanen (4)	Sotkamon Jymy	
1998	Jari Alasmäki	Oulun Lippo	
1999	Pasi Varonen (1)	Kiteen Pallo -90	
2000	Olli Viljaranta (1)	Sotkamon Jymy^{†}	
2001	Olli Viljaranta (2)	Sotkamon Jymy	
2002	Olli Viljaranta (3)	Sotkamon Jymy	
2003	Pasi Virtanen (2)	Kinnarin Pesis^{†}	
2004	Janne Vuorinen (1)	Sotkamon Jymy	
2005	Pasi Varonen (2)	Kiteen Pallo -90	
2006	Janne Vuorinen (2)	Sotkamon Jymy	
2007	Miika Rantatorikka	Hyvinkään Tahko	
2008	Sami Sirviö	Pattijoen Urheilijat	
2009	Mikko Kuosmanen (1)	Sotkamon Jymy	
2010	Risto Ojanperä	Vimpelin Veto	
2011	Mikko Kuosmanen (2)	Sotkamon Jymy	
2012	Mikko Kuosmanen (3)	Sotkamon Jymy	
2013	Mikko Kuosmanen (4)	Sotkamon Jymy	
2014	Mikko Korhonen (1)	Sotkamon Jymy	
2015	Mikko Korhonen (2)	Sotkamon Jymy	
2016	Sami-Petteri Kivimäki (1)	Vimpelin Veto	
2017	Sami-Petteri Kivimäki (2)	Vimpelin Veto	
2018	Petri Pennanen	Joensuun Maila	
2019	Juhani Lehtimäki	Joensuun Maila	
2020	Jani Komulainen	Sotkamon Jymy	
2021	Matti Iivarinen	Manse PP	
2022	Tomi Niskanen	Vimpelin Veto	
2023	Mikko Kuosmanen (5)	Sotkamon Jymy	

=== Women's Superpesis ===
Key
†	Denotes the club were not Superpesis champions in the same season

Winners of the Women's Superpesis Manager of the Season
Season	Manager	Club	Ref
1986	Markus Lakaniemi	Vähänkyrön Viesti^{†}	
1987	Markku Lähteenmäki (1)	Ikaalisten Tarmo	
1988	Paavo Lakaniemi	Lapuan Virkiä	
1989	Petri Kaijansinkko (1)	Jyväskylän Kiri	
1990	Ali Lindström	Roihuttaret^{†}	
1991	Markku Lähteenmäki (2)	Ikaalisten Tarmo	
1992	Petri Kaijansinkko (2)	Lapuan Virkiä	
1993	Markku Kiiski	Siilinjärven Pesis^{†}	
1994	Heikki Kauppinen (1)	Oulun Lippo	
1995	Hannu Pelkonen	Oulun Lippo	
1996	Jussi Viljanen (1)	Jyväskylän Kiri	
1997	Heikki Kauppinen (2)	Lapuan Virkiä^{†}	
1998	Harri Reunanen	Vihdin Pallo	
1999	Raimo Tikkanen	Siilinjärven Pesis	
2000	Risto Ojanperä	Peräseinäjoen Toive^{†}	
2001	Jussi Järvinen	Lapuan Virkiä	
2002	Jussi Viljanen (2)	Pesäkarhut	
2003	Seppo Salmela	Tyrnävän Tempaus^{†}	
2004	Jarmo Ania	Lapuan Virkiä	
2005	Armi Ahola	Kirittäret	
2006	Jyrki Valle	Pesä Ysit^{†}	
2007	Katja Saari (1)	Kirittäret	
2008	Katja Saari (2)	Kirittäret	
2009	Jukka Liikala (1)	Lapuan Virkiä^{†}	
2010	Sami-Petteri Kivimäki	Pesäkarhut^{†}	
2011	Jukka Liikala (2)	Lapuan Virkiä	
2012	Jukka Liikala (3)	Lapuan Virkiä	
2013	Jukka Liikala (4)	Lapuan Virkiä	
2014	Sami Österlund	Pesäkarhut^{†}	
2015	Jukka Liikala (5)	Lapuan Virkiä	
2016	Jussi Viljanen (3)	Kirittäret	
2017	Jarkko Pokela (1)	Manse PP	
2018	Jussi Viljanen (4)	Kirittäret	
2019	Jussi Viljanen (5)	Kirittäret	
2020	Jussi Viljanen (6)	Kirittäret	
2021	Jarkko Pokela (2)	Pesäkarhut	
2022	Mattias Kitola	Kirittäret	
2023	Jarkko Pokela (3)	Pesäkarhut	
