= Töölö Football Stadium =

Football stadium in Helsinki, Finland

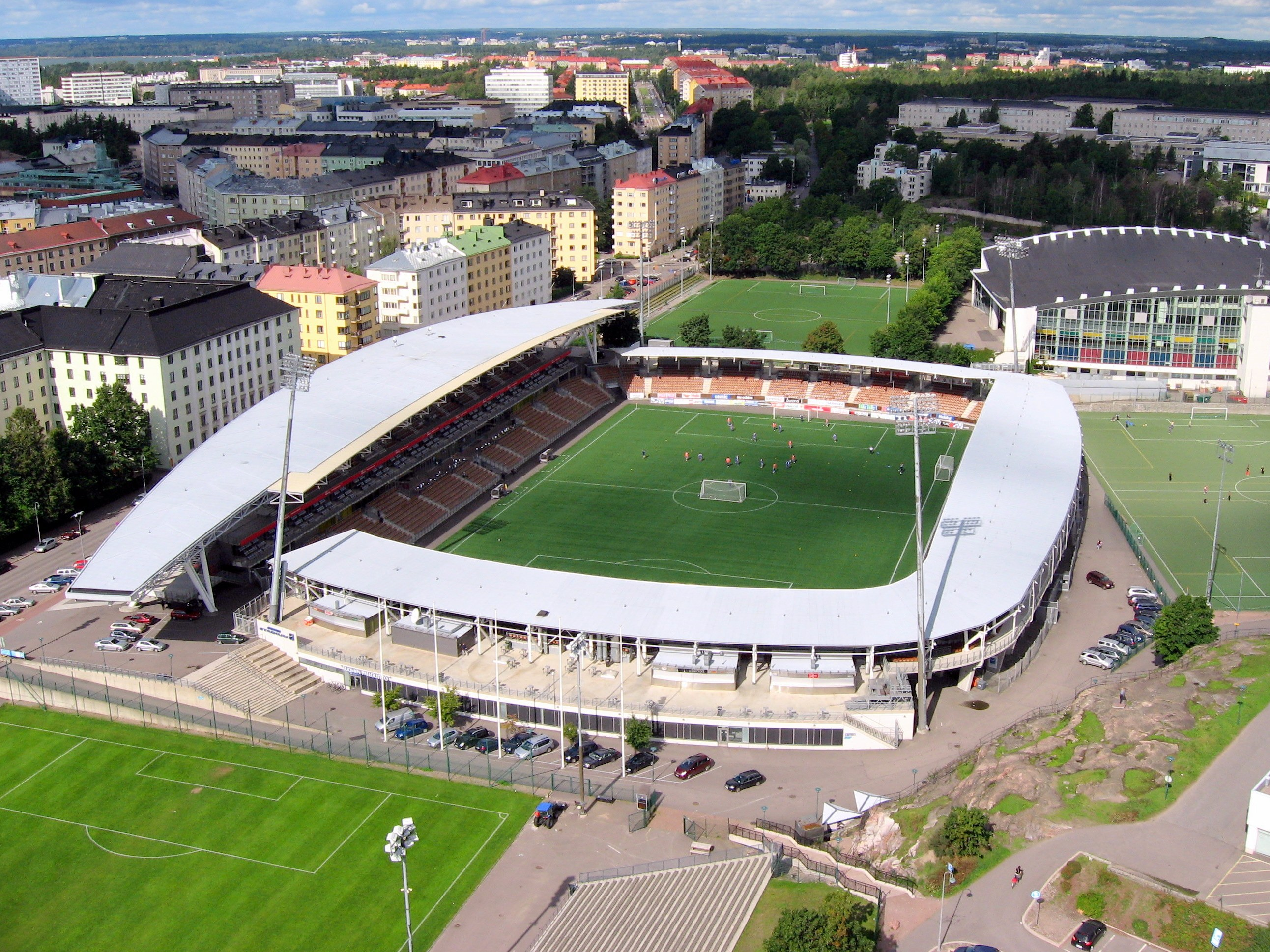
- Stadium in 2008
- Interactive map of Töölö Football Stadium
- Full name: Töölö Football Stadium
- Location: Töölö, Helsinki, Finland
- Coordinates: 60°11′15″N 024°55′21″E
- Owner: City of Helsinki
- Capacity: 10,770
- Surface: Artificial turf
- Field size: 105 × 68 m

Construction
- Built: 1999–2000
- Opened: 2000

Tenants
- Helsingin Jalkapalloklubi (2000–present); Klubi 04 (2004–present)

Töölö Football Stadium (Finnish: Töölön jalkapallostadion, Swedish: Tölö fotbollsstadion), officially Bolt Arena for sponsorship reasons, and known as Helsinki Football Stadium for UEFA events, is a football stadium in Töölö, Helsinki, Finland. It is the home stadium of Veikkausliiga club HJK Helsinki, temporarily also serving as home ground for IF Gnistan.

Previous sponsorship names include Telia 5G -areena until January 2020, Sonera Stadium until April 2017, and Finnair Stadium until August 2010.

== History ==
The stadium was inaugurated in 2000. It has a capacity of 10,770 spectators. Originally the ground had a natural grass pitch, but it was soon replaced with an artificial one because the grass couldn't get enough sunlight. Since then the stadium has seen numerous artificial playing surfaces that have been gradually replaced. The most recent artificial pitch was installed in April 2025.

The ground is located next to the Helsinki Olympic Stadium.

It is the home stadium of HJK. It hosted the 2003 FIFA U-17 World Championship as Töölö Stadium.

The stadium was named as one of the stadiums that would host the 2009 UEFA Women's Championship. For that tournament, the artificial turf covering the field was temporarily replaced with grass.

In the 2016 Veikkausliiga domestic league season, tenants HJK Helsinki drew the highest average home attendance (5,101).

On 15 November 2019, the Finland national football team managed to qualify to the first major tournament, UEFA Euro 2020, in their history after defeating Liechtenstein 3–0 at this stadium.

The stadium hosted a men's Superpesis pesäpallo match on 12 May 2022 between Joensuun Maila and Pattijoen Urheilijat in front of 886 spectators.

== The specifications of the stadium ==
- Field size: 105 × 68 metres (UEFA recommendation)
- Floodlights: 1500 lux
- Capacity of 10,770 spectators, all stands are covered
- A warming system under the pitch
- Discussion about expanding to 25,000 seats
