= Leevi Viitala =

Finnish ice hockey player

- Born: June 20, 2001 (age 24) Pomarkku, Finland
- Height: 181 cm (5 ft 11 in)
- Weight: 92 kg (203 lb; 14 st 7 lb)
- Position: LW/RW
- Shoots: Right
- SM-liiga team (P) Cur. team: Porin Ässät; TUTO Hockey (Mestis)
- Playing career: 2020–present

Leevi Viitala (born 20 June 2001) is a Finnish ice hockey player who plays for TUTO Hockey in the Mestis on loan from the Porin Ässät of the SM-liiga. Viitala has also played Finnish baseball for 10 years in Kankaanpään Maila and Pomarkun Pyry.

== Career ==
Leevi Viitala made his SM-liiga debut with Ässät in 2020. He played 12 games and put up 5 points.

In 2021 Viitala made an extension contranct with Ässät.
