= Ukonniemi Stadium =

Pesäpallo stadium in Imatra, Finland

- Location within South Karelia Location within Finland Location within Europe
- Address: Ottelukatu 11; 55420 Imatra
- Location: Imatra, Finland
- Coordinates: 61.196983°N 28.730593°E
- Owner: City of Imatra
- Capacity: 3,000
- Surface: Clay; Tarmac (Parts of deep field and left edge)
- Record attendance: 5,029; July 2, 2017 (All-Star Game)
- Field size: Left field: 172 m (564 ft); Centre field: 187 m (614 ft); Right field: 209 m (686 ft)

Construction
- Opened: 2015

Tenant
- Imatran Pallo-Veikot (2015–present)

Ukonniemi Stadium is a pesäpallo stadium located in Imatra, Finland. Since its opening in 2015, it has been the home field of the Imatran Pallo-Veikot, a Superpesis team.

The Ukonniemi Stadium is a multi-purpose stadium, that serves as a baseball stadium in summer and a ski stadium in winter. The ball can bounce through the 3 sides as it went through to the winter biathlon shooting areas. Ukonniemi Stadium was the venue for pesäpallo's All-Star Games in the summer of 2017.
