= Finnish pesäpallo match-fixing scandal =

1998 sports scandal in Finland

Finnish pesäpallo match-fixing scandal was a match fixing scandal in Finland that involved a large number of players, managers and other team officials of Superpesis, the top professional league of the Finnish sport of pesäpallo, a game similar to baseball.

== The scam ==
On the 11th and 13 August 1998, players and managers of eight teams fixed five different matches. Sports gambling is legal in Finland, and all games were on the betting list of the Finnish national betting agency Veikkaus. The matches were in the last two rounds on the Superpesis regular season and were meaningless for the teams. Four out of five matches ended in a draw after two periods, paying high odds.

The scam was unveiled a year later. Finnish police interrogated 460 persons involving the fixing. Most of them were never charged due to lack of evidence or for the reason that they were only lucky gamblers who had a hint on the results of meaningless games. Over thirty people were sentenced to fines or discharged. Veikkaus suffered losses of at least 14 million mk (€2,3 million).

== Aftermath ==
All teams involved were relegated two levels down in the league system and Veikkaus imposed a ban on all betting on pesäpallo matches for six years. The agency started taking bets again in 2005. Betting on a draw was not allowed until 2009. Superpesis lost a part of its state financing.

Public interest on pesäpallo, which is considered to be the national game of Finland, fell for many years before recovering. Attendance did not reach pre-scandal levels until 2009.

== Fixed matches ==
11 August 1998

- SMJ, Seinäjoki – KaMa, Kankaanpää 1-2 (5-2,5-6,0-3)
- Lippo, Oulu – Kiri, Jyväskylä 2-1 (4-2,4-5,0-0,3-1)

13 August 1998

- Tiikerit, Helsinki – HP, Hamina 2-1 (8-3,2-3,6-0)
- SiiPe, Siilinjärvi – Juvan Pallo, Juva 0-2 (1-4,4-6)
- KaMa, Kankaanpää – Lippo, Oulu 2-1 (0-6,4-0,2-1)
