= Pöytyän Urheilijat =

Finnish sports club

Information
- League: Superpesis
- Location: Pöytyä, Finland
- Ballpark: Kaulanperä Field
- Founded: 1945
- Colors: red, black, white
- Ownership: Pöytyän Urheilijat ry
- Manager: Mika Lehto
- Website: www.poytyanurheilijat.fi

Pöytyän Urheilijat (lit. "Pöytyä Athletes") is a Finnish women's pesäpallo team from Pöytyä. It was founded in 1945. Pöytyän Urheilijat has participated in many sports in Finland over the years, such as floorball, skiing and disc golf. Pöytyän Urheilijat is playing in the top-tier women's Superpesis.

The home ground of Pöytyän Urheilijat is the Kaulanperä Field.
