= Alajärven Ankkurit =

Finnish sports club

- Logo

Information
- League: Superpesis
- Location: Alajärvi, Finland
- Ballpark: Kitro Stadium
- Founded: 1944
- Colors: blue, yellow
- Ownership: Alajärven Ankkurit ry Alajärven Ankkuritpesis ry
- Manager: Juha-Matti Jaatinen
- Website: www.ankkuritpesis.fi

Alajärven Ankkurit (lit. "Alajärvi Anchors") is a Finnish sports club from Alajärvi. It was founded in 1944. Alajärven Ankkurit has participated in many sports in Finland over the years, such as athletics, skiing and volleyball. Since 1980s, the club's main successes have been in pesäpallo. Alajärven Ankkurit is playing in the top-tier Superpesis.

Alajärven Ankkurit has won the men's Finnish Pesäpallo Championship (Superpesis) two times in years 1988 and 1989. The home ground of Alajärven Ankkurit is the Kitro Stadium.

== History ==
Alajärven Ankkurit was founded in 1944. The club operates as a general club. Besides pesäpallo, the strongest sports are athletics, skiing and orienteering. In addition to the pesäpallo players, the club's most famous athlete is Reijo Vähälä, who won the European silver medal in the high jump in 1969.

Despite its small size, Ankkurit is one of the big clubs in pesäpallo. The club was long overshadowed by its local rival Vimpelin Veto. In the 1970s, the position of the opponents changed as Ankkurit rose towards the top of the league and Vimpeli's success faded.

The club's best seasons came in the 1980s, when the club won two Finnish championships (1988, 1989), two silver medals (1980, 1987) and two bronze medals (1984, 1985). The Ankkurit won their last of seven medals in 1992, when they finished in bronze.

The club's history has been marked by many legendary figures. The most legendary of these is Pekka Peltomäki.

== Supporters and rivalries ==
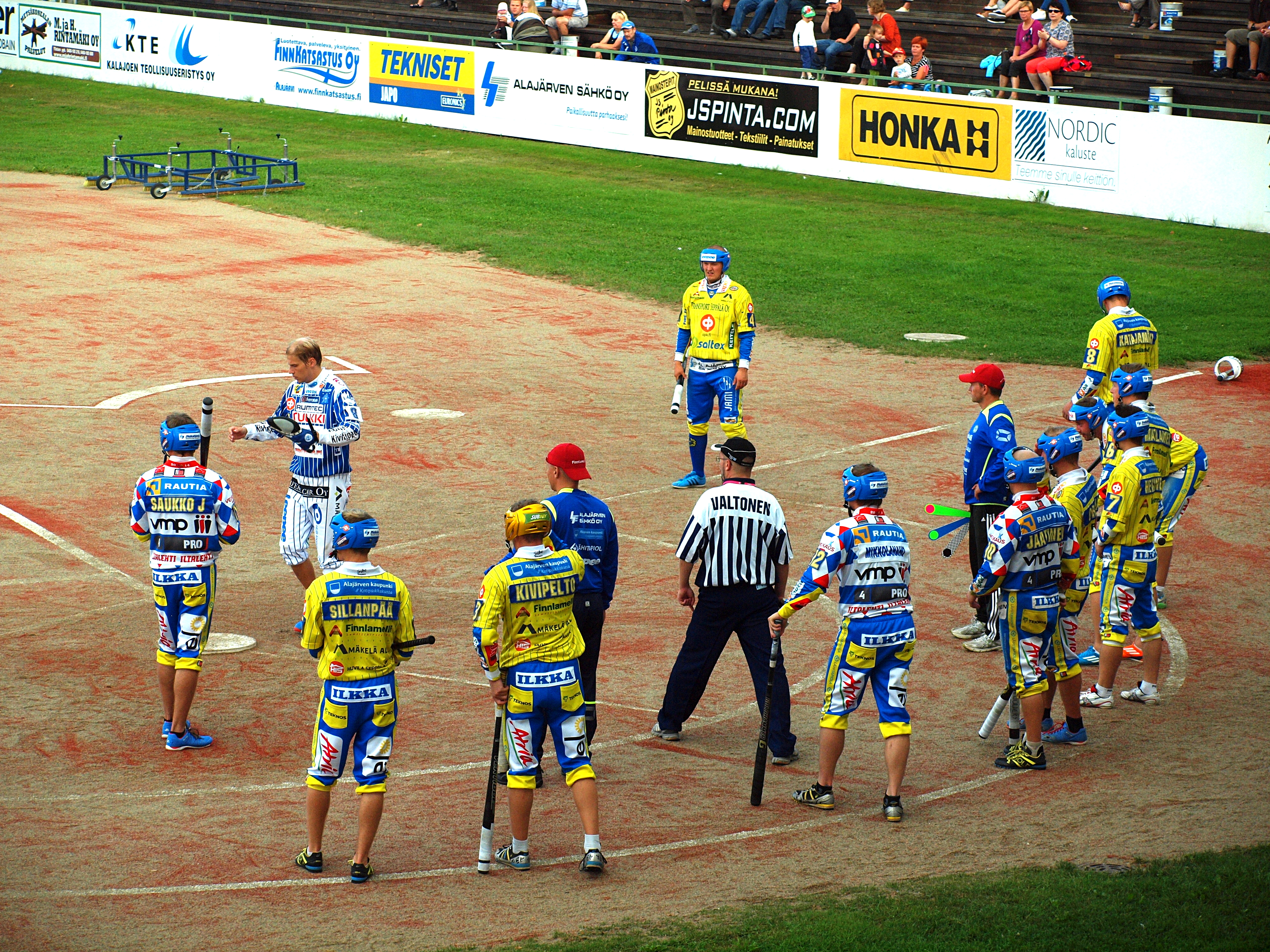
Local rivalry Alajärven Ankkurit vs. Vimpelin Veto at August 2014.

The club's local rivalry is Vimpelin Veto. Vimpelin Veto plays its home game 20 kilometres from Alajärvi. The road connecting the two towns has been called the "road of hatred" The relationship between Alajärvi and Vimpeli has been described as blood enemies who are part of each other's history. There are strong feelings between the clubs and their supporters.

The transfer of players between clubs has not traditionally been looked upon favourably. In the past decades in particular, it may have taken on great proportions. The best known of those who have played for both clubs is Vesa Liikala, who is particularly known as a symbol of Vimpeli.

== Achievements ==
Men's Pesäpallo

Superpesis

Type	Trophy	Titles	Seasons
Finnish championship	Winners	2	1988, 1989
Finnish championship	Second place	2	1980, 1987
Finnish championship	Third place	3	1984, 1985, 1992
