= Koskenkorvan Urheilijat =

Finnish professional baseball team

Information
- League: Ykköspesis
- Location: Ilmajoki, Finland
- Ballpark: Sähkökoje Areena
- Founded: 1945
- Nickname: Kossu
- Former league: Superpesis (1999–2023)
- Colors: Red, black, brown, white
- Ownership: Koskenkorvan Urheilijat ry
- Website: koskenkorvanurheilijat.fi

Koskenkorvan Urheilijat (Finnish for "Koskenkorva Athletes", sometimes referred to as Koskenkorva) is a Finnish professional pesäpallo team based in Ilmajoki and playing in the Superpesis, the highest-tier of Finnish pesäpallo league system. Koskenkorvan Urheilijat has participated in many sports in Finland over the years, such as athletics. Since 1985, the club's main successes have been in pesäpallo.

Koskenkorvan Urheilijat has won the men's Finnish Pesäpallo bronze medal, (Superpesis) two times, 2003 and in 2007. Koskenkorvan Urheilijat's home ground is the Sähkökoje Areena.

== History ==
Koskenkorvan Urheilijat played for a long time in the third-tier Suomensarja and the provincial league, until the end of the 1980s, when they got a taste of the first division. Its place in the first division was consolidated in the 1990s, when they became the top club in the municipality, ahead of Ilmajoen Kisailijat.

Kossu was promoted to the Superpesis in the autumn of 1998 and played continuously in top-tier from then until the autumn of 2023. The first decade of the 2000s in particular was a time of greatness for Kossu. It rose to the top of the league and was consistently among the top teams. During these years, the club won two SM bronze medals, in 2003 and 2007.

Although Kossu won only two medals, its success was steady. Between 1999 and 2018, Kossu missed the play-offs only three times. The last five seasons were more challenging, however, and Kossu did not make the play-offs once during this period.

The club's story comes down to one man, Antti Alho. The founder of a local electrical equipment manufacturer was the club's general manager when the club was promoted to Superpesis. Alho also built the club its own stadium. Alho stepped down from club's management in 2016 and died the following year at the age of 70.

== Achievements ==
Men's Pesäpallo

Superpesis

Type	Trophy	Titles	Seasons
Finnish championship	Third place	2	2003, 2007
Finnish Cup	Second place	1	1989
