= Hyvinkään Tahko =

Finnish sports club

- Logo

Information
- League: Superpesis
- Location: Hyvinkää, Finland
- Ballpark: Pihkala Stadium
- Founded: 1915
- League championships: Men: (4) 1979, 1980, 1981, 2007; Men (Cup): (2) 1976, 1987; Women: (2) 1979, 1983
- Former league: Finnish Cup
- Colors: yellow, black
- Ownership: Hyvinkään Tahko ry Tahko Pesis Oy
- Manager: Jarkko Pokela
- Website: hyvinkaantahko.fi

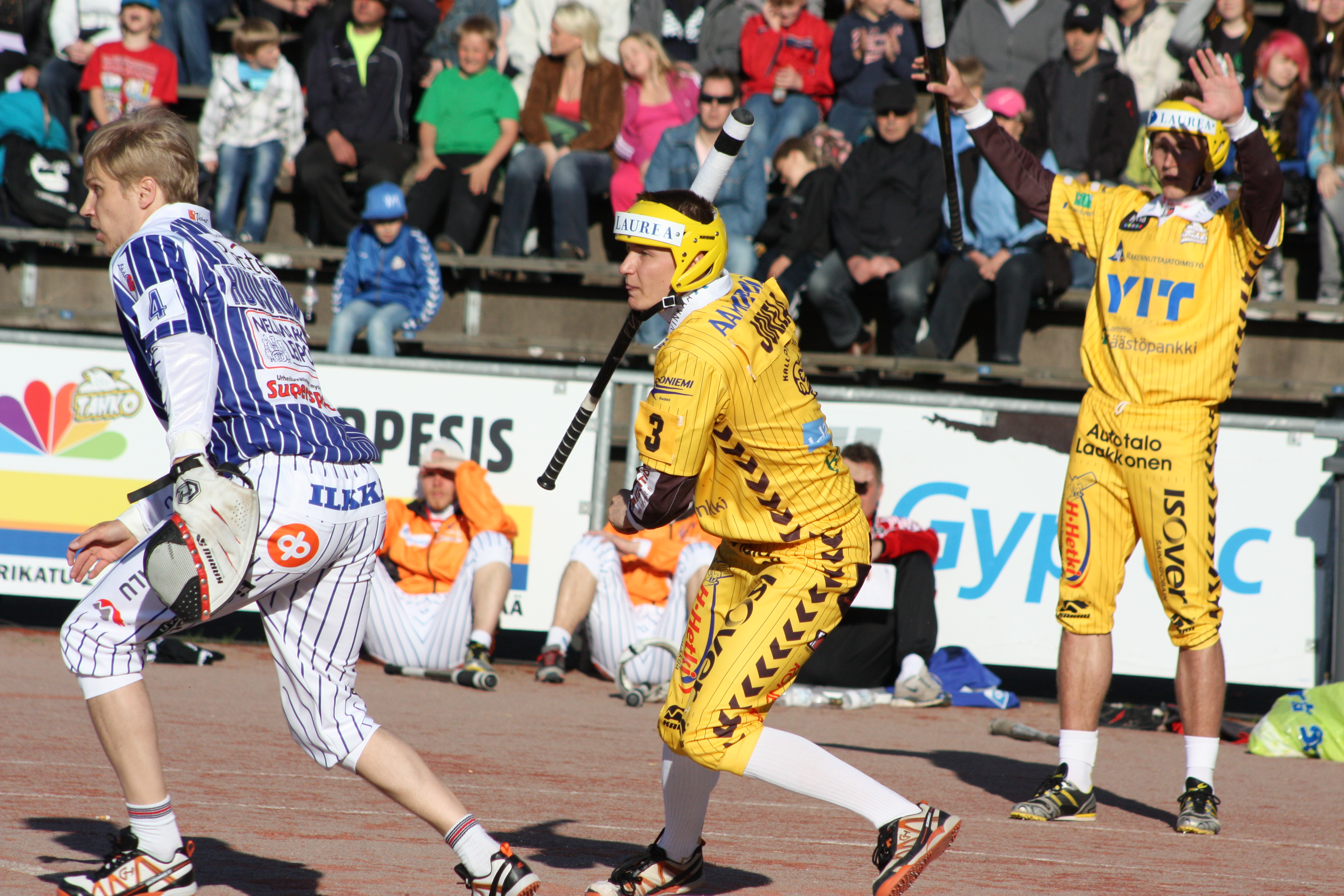
The game between Tahko and Vimpelin Veto in 2011.

Hyvinkään Tahko (lit. "Hyvinkää Grindstone") is a Finnish sports club from Hyvinkää.

It was founded in 1915 and in 2025 celebrates its 110th anniversary. Hyvinkää Tahko has participated in many sports in Finland over the years, such as athletics, skiing and orienteering. Since 1980, the club's main successes have been in basketball and pesäpallo. The club also participates in baseball competitions.

Hyvinkää Tahko has won the men's Finnish Pesäpallo Championship, (Superpesis) four times, between 1979 and 1981, and in 2007. The Women's Championship Tahko has won twice in 1979 and 1983. Tahko's home ground is the Pihkala Stadium.

In 2024, the club was reported as being in financial difficulties.

== Achievements ==
Men's Pesäpallo
Superpesis

Winners	Second place	Third place
1979, 1980, 1981, 2007	1983, 1990, 1992, 1994, 1996, 1999	1978, 1982, 2002

Finnish Cup: Winners - 1976, 1987

Women's Pesäpallo
Superpesis

Winners	Second place	Third place
1979, 1983	1975	1974

Men's Basketball

Finnish League

Third Place - 1980, 1981
