= Superpesis =

Professional pesäpallo league in Finland

- Current season, competition or edition: Superpesis season 2025
- Formerly: Pesäpallon SM-sarja
- Sport: Pesäpallo
- Founded: 1989
- Owner: Superpesis Oy
- No. of teams: 13 (men); 12 (women)
- Country: Finland
- Most recent champions: Manse PP (men); Manse PP (women)
- Most titles: Sotkamon Jymy (20, men); Kirittäret (12, women)
- Broadcasters: Nelonen Media; Yle
- Level on pyramid: 1
- Relegation to: Ykköspesis
- Domestic cup: Pesäpallon Suomen Cup (defunct)
- Website: Superpesis.fi

The Superpesis (lit. 'Super pesäpallo') is the highest level of the Finnish pesäpallo league system. Contested by 13 clubs in men's league and 12 clubs in women's league, it operates on a system of promotion and relegation with the Ykköspesis (lit. 'First pesäpallo'). Seasons usually run from May to August, with each men's team playing around 30 matches and women's teams 24 matches in the regular and continuation series: two against each other, one at home and one away. After the regular season, a continuation series will be played to determine the 8 teams that make the play-offs and the teams that qualify for the knockout stage and the teams that are relegated.

Games are played on weekday evenings and weekend afternoons, with matches usually starting at or before 18:00. Only a few teams have permanent artificial lighting (among them Imatran Pallo-Veikot), and day/night or nighttime matches are not held.

The competition was founded in 1989, following the Finnish Championship (the top-tier league from 1955 to 1989). The Superpesis takes advantage of a €100,000 television rights deal with Nelonen Media and Yle securing the broadcasting rights to all Superpesis games, with many matches broadcast on national television. The Superpesis is run by a limited company owned by the Finnish Pesäpallo Association, with Olli Aro as a chief executive.

In contrast to baseball tournaments like World Series and Japan Series, there is no specific name for the Superpesis finals series, instead simply being called Superpesiksen finaali (lit. 'Superpesis final'). An annual all-star game called Itä–Länsi-ottelu (lit. 'East-West Match') is played annually.

Thirty-one clubs have competed in the men's Superpesis and forty-three clubs in the women's Superpesis since its inception in 1990. Nine of them have won the men's title and eleven of them the women's title. The winners in men's league are: Sotkamon Jymy (19), Vimpelin Veto (4), Kiteen Pallo -90 (3), Joensuun Maila (2), Oulun Lippo (2), Imatran Pallo-Veikot (1), Hyvinkään Tahko (1), Pattijoen Urheilijat (1) and Manse PP (1). Sotkamon Jymy have won the most titles, with nineteen, and the most successive titles, with five. Only three clubs have played in every season to date: Hyvinkään Tahko, Kiteen Pallo -90 and Sotkamon Jymy.

The winners in women's league are: Kirittäret (12), Lapuan Virkiä (9), Pesäkarhut (3), Jyväskylän Kiri (2), Oulun Lippo (2), Ikaalisten Tarmo (1), Manse PP (1), Pattijoen Urheilijat (1), Siilinjärven Pesis (1), Vihdin Pallo (1) and Viinijärven Urheilijat (1). Kirittäret have won the most titles, with twelve, and the most successive titles, with six. Only one club, Lapuan Virkiä, have played in every season to date.

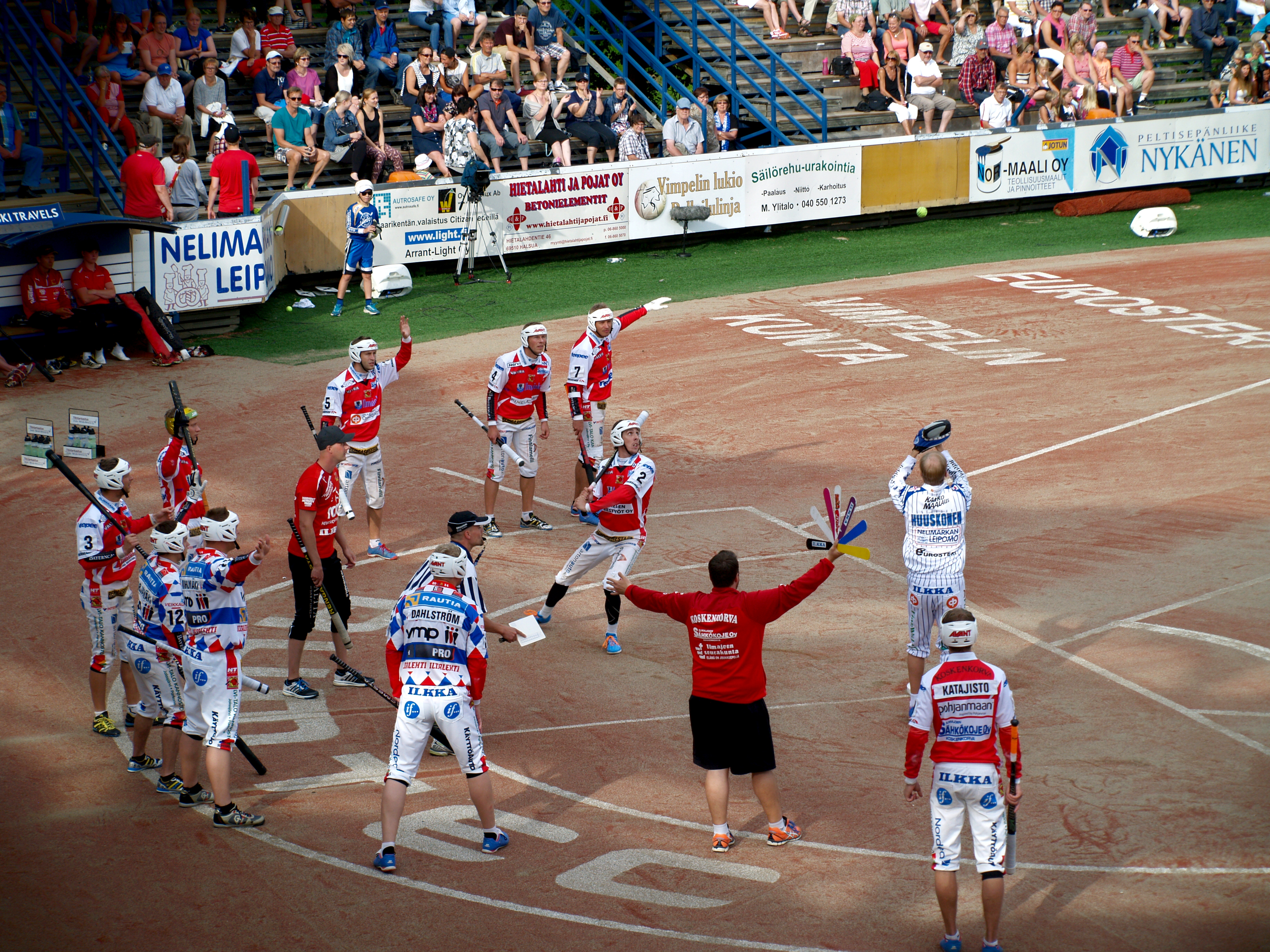
Superpesis match: Vimpeli versus Koskenkorva.

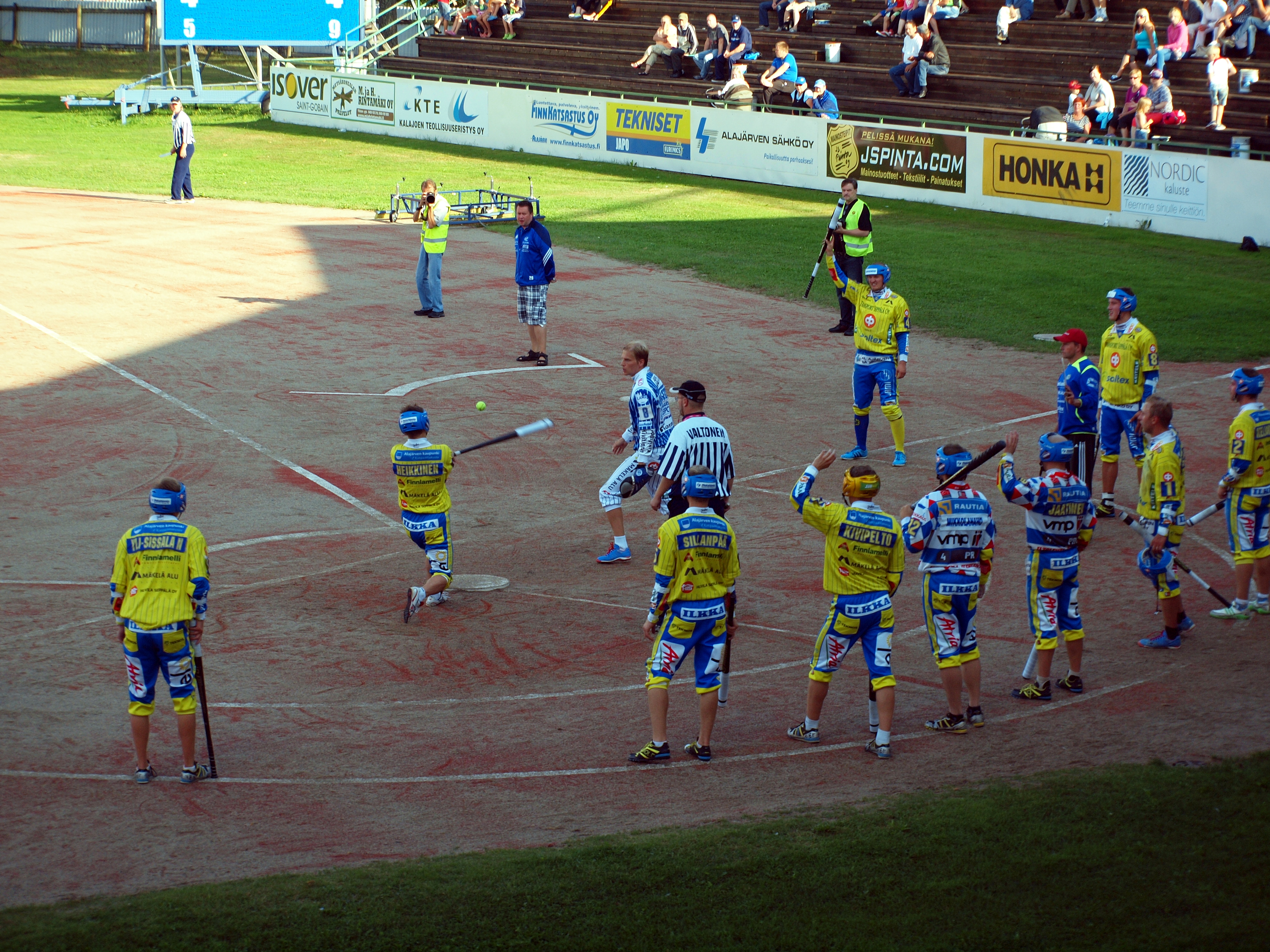
Superpesis match: Alajärvi versus Vimpeli.

== Popularity ==
The men's Superpesis is third most-watched men's sports league in Finland, and the women's league is the most-watched women's one. In 2021, Superpesis matches were streamed more than a million times on Ruutu, and larger matches are broadcast on national television on the channels of Nelonen Media and in 2024 also Yle.

Most popular in semi-urban and rural Finnish-speaking municipalities (most of them inland), along with some notability in larger cities like Tampere and Oulu, the pesäpallo matches gain a significant number of attendances compared to the population in the areas. The league (especially the men's league) has however had only limited presence in the largest coastal cities (e.g. Helsinki, Turku, or Pori), where either the attendances are low or where no teams have been from.

In the 2023 season, the average of men's Superpesis match attendance was 1,381, and women's average match attendance was 661. This puts the league a bit behind the men's ice hockey 2023–24 Liiga (Average attendance: 4,568) and men's association football 2024 Veikkausliiga (Average attendance: 2,957).

The highest known match attendance between 2 clubs in the Superpesis era is 7,640, which was a match between Hyvinkään Tahko and Sotkamon Jymy in 1992.

== History ==
=== Origins ===
In the 1980s, as Finnish society changed, the role of pesäpallo had to be re-examined. The sport had long drawn its strength from the countryside and village game culture, but with urbanisation, the rural population was dwindling and pesäpallo needed a new direction.

In the 1980s, the Finnish Pesäpallo Association launched the "Pesäpallo is the most Finnish Game" (Finnish: Pesis on peleistä suomalaisin, POPS) project, which aimed to communicate the new future of pesäpallo to clubs, local politicians and the media. The project gave pesäpallo a social profile and practical marketing and visibility measures, as well as efforts to turn pesäpallo into a television product. Superpesis Oy was set up as the marketing organisation for the men's and women's main league clubs. At the same time, work began on improving conditions, including the development of match venues, the introduction of sand artificial turf fields and the construction of pesäpallo stadiums.

The marketing of pesäpallo was aimed at strengthening the sport's identity by emphasising its local character and roots. The aim was to bring baseball to the big cities, with the names of localities appearing in the league table instead of clubs. Pesäpallo clubs largely represented municipalities and entire provinces.

In the development of the game, the number of matches was increased, and new elements were introduced: additional batters (1985), play-offs (1987) and tie-breaks (1990). Pesäpallo evolved into a top sport, and the quantity and quality of training reached a high level. The game became more tactical and began to make use of statistics and data.

=== The boom in pesäpallo (1990s) ===
The first Superpesis season was played in 1990. With the new Superpesis, pesäpallo also gained a new dominant team when Sotkamon Jymy won the Finnish championship for the first time since 1963. Sotkamon Jymy was regularly ranked in the top three or higher for eight years and won six championships during the decade.

In 1994, pesäpallo moved to a period system, which revolutionised the scoring system in Superpesis. In the same season, Oulun Lippo became champion, the second most successful team in the 1990s. Lippo won two SM golds, one silver and one bronze. Kiteen Pallo -90 won its first championship in 1999. In 1996, a scoring contest was added to the game.

In the 1990s, pesäpallo became a nationwide phenomenon, with Superpesis becoming the most popular summer ball game in terms of viewership. Average attendance figures were high in both large and small towns, with peak attendance figures reaching between 6,000 and 7,000 spectators. The Superpesis matches were broadcast on MTV3, and the regular season matches were watched by more than 300,000 viewers at best. Real-time statistics of matches and the transmission of situations via teletext were major advances in the field of communication.

New pesäpallo stadiums were built in Sotkamo, Vimpeli, Seinäjoki, Oulu and many smaller towns and cities. Sand fields became part of the conditions required for Superpesis. In 1997, the Kaisaniemen Tiikerit were promoted to Superpesis by a cabinet decision to promote the metropolitan project; the team went on to fold 2 years later.

In the 1990s, pesäpallo moved to semi-professionalism in player salaries, with the best players becoming full professionals. In 1998, the pesäpallo community was rocked by a major match-fixing scandal known as "Black Thursday." The incident led to the loss of television coverage of Superpesis, and in the early 2000s, the value base and foundation of the sport was rebuilt. Pesäpallo returned to basics and on-field work.

=== Sotkamo's reign continues (2000s) ===
The 2000s in Superpesis was mainly dominated by Sotkamon Jymy. The team was by far the strongest team in Superpesis during the decade. Kiteen Pallo -90 won the first championship of the decade, but the following year Sotkamo took revenge on Kitee and began their four-year championship season.

Kitee made a return to the gold medal in 2005, but Jymy returned as champions again in 2006 and 2009. Throughout the decade, Sotkamo Jymy played at least in the top three. During the decade, Pattijoen Urheilijat became champions for the first time in their history in 2008 and the club won several medals during the decade.

Kouvolan Pallonlyöjät and Joensuun Maila joined the main league during the decade. In 2001, the two-run rule and the batsman's skip rule were introduced in Superpesis, which brought game changes and increased the tacticality of the game.

=== From the big two to the big four (2010s) ===
In 2010, Superpesis experienced a new boom, which was significantly demonstrated by Jere Dahlström's shot that clinched the championship for Vimpelin Veto being voted the most heartwarming sporting moment of 2010.

In the early 2010s, the power structure between the clubs became more stable. Sotkamon Jymy won the Finnish championship five times in a row between 2011 and 2015, always defeating Vimpelin Veto in the final. Vimpeli beat Sotkamo in the finals in 2016 and 2017, while Joensuun Maila won bronze in five consecutive years from 2013 to 2017. The early 2010s have been considered a dynasty, especially between Vimpeli and Sotkamo, whose encounters are known in Finnish as "El Klassikko", after the name of the El Clásico matches between FC Barcelona and Real Madrid.

After a long bronze medal season, Joensuun Maila became the leading pesäpallo club and won the Finnish championship in 2018 and 2019, while Kouvolan Pallonlyöjät established itself as the fourth largest club.

In terms of play, pesäpallo developed significantly in the 2010s and the level expanded. Weaker outfield players could no longer be "hidden" on the field, and in order to succeed, top players had to be present at all positions. The physicality and pace of the game accelerated markedly, and the use of bounce was reduced.

Video assistant referee systems have been introduced as of the 2024 season.

== Clubs ==
The Superpesis clubs in the 2025 season are:

=== Men ===
Team	City	Founded	Stadium	Capacity
Alajärven Ankkurit	Alajärvi	1944	Kitro Stadium	4,000
Haminan Palloilijat	Hamina	1928	Rampart Field	3,000
Hyvinkään Tahko	Hyvinkää	1915	Pihkala Stadium	4,000
Imatran Pallo-Veikot	Imatra	1955	Ukonniemi Stadium	3,000
Joensuun Maila	Joensuu	1958	Mehtimäki Stadium	3,700–4,500
Kempeleen Kiri	Kempele	1915	Sarkkiranta Stadium	2,200
Kiteen Pallo -90	Kitee	1990	Shore Field	5,000
Kouvolan Pallonlyöjät	Kouvola	1931	Kouvola Pesäpallo Stadium	5,000
Manse PP	Tampere	2005	Kauppi Stadium	2,516
Pattijoen Urheilijat	Raahe	1928	Rännäri Stadium	3,000
Sotkamon Jymy	Sotkamo	1909	Hiukka Stadium	4,500
Vimpelin Veto	Vimpeli	1934	Island Field	2,590

Location of teams of the 2025 men's Superpesis season.

=== Past participants ===
==== Relegated ====
Teams relegated were relegated to second-tier Ykköspesis in the year shown, and are there today unless noted otherwise.

- Vaasan Maila (relegated 1992)
- Muhoksen Pallo-Salamat (relegated 1994; was in the Tier 3 Suomensarja as of 2025)
- Riihimäen Pallonlyöjät (relegated 1995; was in Suomensarja as of 2025)
- Haapajärven Pesä-Kiilat (relegated 1998; was in Suomensarja as of 2025)
- Juvan Pallo (relegated 1998, now Juvan Nuorisopesis)
- Loimaan Palloilijat (relegated 2001; was in Suomensarja as of 2025)
- Kinnarin Pesis (relegated 2004, now Kinnarin Pesis 2006)
- Puijon Pesis (relegated 2009)
- Ulvilan Pesä-Veikot (relegated 2010; was in Suomensarja as of 2025)
- Jyväskylän Kiri (relegated 2016)
- Oulun Lippo (relegated 2018)
- Kankaanpään Maila (relegated 2022)
- Koskenkorvan Urheilijat (relegated 2023)
- Seinäjoen JymyJussit (relegated 2024 mid-season due to economic problems, now Seinäjoen Maila-Jussit)

==== Withdrew from league ====
- Kaisaniemen Tiikerit (went bankrupt at the end of 1998)
- Seinäjoen Maila-Jussit (left after 2008)
- Nurmon Jymy (left after 2012)
- Siilinjärven Pesis (left after 2021)

=== Women ===
Team	City	Stadium	Founded
Fera	Rauma	Otanlahti Stadium	1958
Hyvinkään Tahko	Hyvinkää	Pihkala Stadium	1915
Joensuun Maila	Joensuu	Mehtimäki Stadium	1958
Kirittäret	Jyväskylä	Hippos Stadium	1999
Laitilan Jyske	Laitila	Laitila Pesäpallo Field	1911
Lapuan Virkiä	Lapua	Lukkarila Stadium	1907
Manse PP	Tampere	Kauppi Stadium	2011
Pesäkarhut	Pori	Pori Pesäpallo Stadium	1985
Pöytyän Urheilijat	Pöytyä	Kaulanperä Field	1945
Roihuttaret	Helsinki	Roihuvuori Field	1957
Seinäjoen Maila-Jussit	Seinäjoki	Seinäjoki Pesäpallo Stadium	1932
Vaasan Mailattaret	Vaasa	Hietalahti Pesäpallo Stadium	2015

Location of teams of the 2025 women's Superpesis season.

=== Past participants ===
==== Relegated ====
Teams relegated were relegated to second-tier Ykköspesis in the year shown, and are there today unless noted otherwise.

- Kokemäen Kova-Väki (relegated 1991)
- Ikaalisten Tarmo (relegated 1996)
- Vähänkyrön Viesti (relegated 1997)
- Tyrnävän Tempaus (relegated 2009)
- Jyväskylän Valo (relegated 2010)
- Lappajärven Veikot (relegated 2019)
- Mynämäen Vesa (relegated 2021)
- Pesä Ysit (relegated 2021)
- Siilinjärven Pesis (relegated 2021)
- Kempeleen Kiri (relegated 2023)
- Haminan Palloilijat (relegated 2024)

==== Withdrew from league ====
- Kajaanin Hymy (left after 2001)
- Vimpelin Veto (left after 2002)
- Hämeenlinnan Paukku (left after 2003)
- Pattijoen Urheilijat (left after 2003)
- Peräseinäjoen Toive (left after 2004)
- Sotkamon Jymy (left after 2006)
- Ylihärmän Pesis-Junkkarit (left after 2012)
- PeTo-Jussit (left after 2012)
- Turku-Pesis (left after 2013)
- Vuokatin Veto (left after 2014)
- Kankaanpään Maila (left after 2015)
- Vihdin Pallo (left after 2016)
- Viinijärven Urheilijat (left after 2016)
- Kajaanin Pallokerho (left after 2017)
- Oulun Lipottaret (left after 2018)

=== Alternate stadiums ===
In addition to the team's ordinary stadiums, regular season matches have also been played at Bolt Arena, Helsinki, at Hiiu Stadium in Tallinn, Estonia, at Complejo Deportivo Municipal Elola in Fuengirola, Spain, and at Vikingavallen in Jomala, Åland.

The selected stadiums for such events have usually been association football pitches with artificial turf. In comparison, plans to play the 2022 Superpesis finals at Helsinki Olympic Stadium as best-of-1 series were scrapped in part due to teams' opposition to playing on natural grass (though with sand drizzled on) and large portions of track and field surfacing.

== Competition format ==
During league play, the teams earn:

- 3 points for winning in 2 periods (8 innings; ordinary time).
- 2 points for winning in extra time (9th inning or shootout).
- 1 point for losing in extra time.

=== Men's Superpesis ===
The men's league began using a partially split league table in the 2024 season, similar to that of the Scottish Premiership in association football. After 24 matches, the top 7 teams enter a top section, while the bottom 6 teams enter a bottom section.

The top section plays an additional 6 matches. Top 6 progress to the quarter-finals, while the 7th-placed team goes to the preliminary knockout round.

The bottom section plays an additional 5 matches. Top 3 progress to the preliminary knockout round, the 4th-placed team finished their season, while the 5th- and 6th-placed teams play a best-of-5 relegation play-out. The play-out winner finishes their season, while the loser enters a promotion/relegation best-of-3 against the Ykköspesis winner. The loser is relegated to, or remains in, the Ykköspesis.

In the knockout rounds, the preliminary round is played best-of-3, and the winners go to the quarter-finals. The quarter-finals, semi-finals, and final are played best-of-5. Additionally, a bronze match is played as best-of-3.

=== Women's Superpesis ===
As of the 2024 season, the women's league uses a similar system to the men's league, but without a split table. Instead the top 6 progress to the quarter-finals, while the 7th- through 10th-placed teams went to the preliminary knockout round.

== List of champions ==
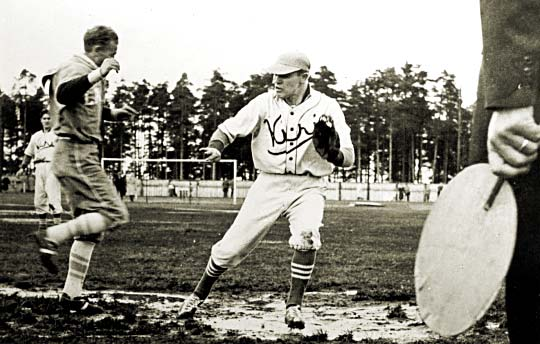
Finnish Baseball has been a tight twist even since wartime. The picture was taken from the match between Kiri in Jyväskylä and Mailaveikko in Lahti in 1953.

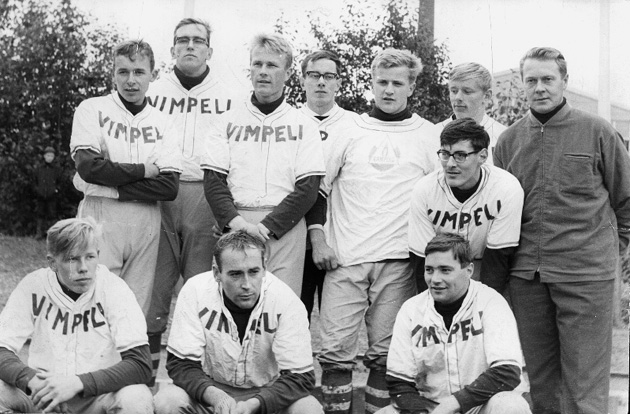
Finnish Champion team, Vimpelin Veto in 1965

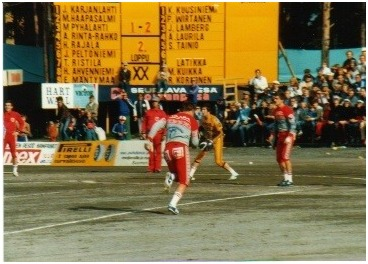
Picture from the men's Finnish Championship series match SMJ - Tahko in 1981.

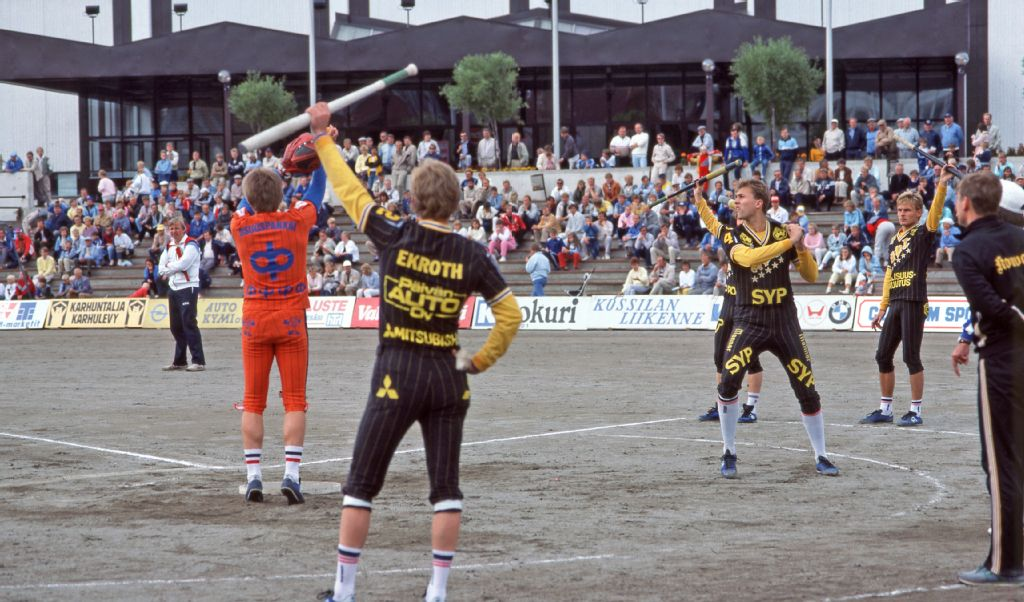
Kouvolan Pallonlyöjät (KPL) against Kankaanpään Maila (KaMa) in Kouvola 1985.

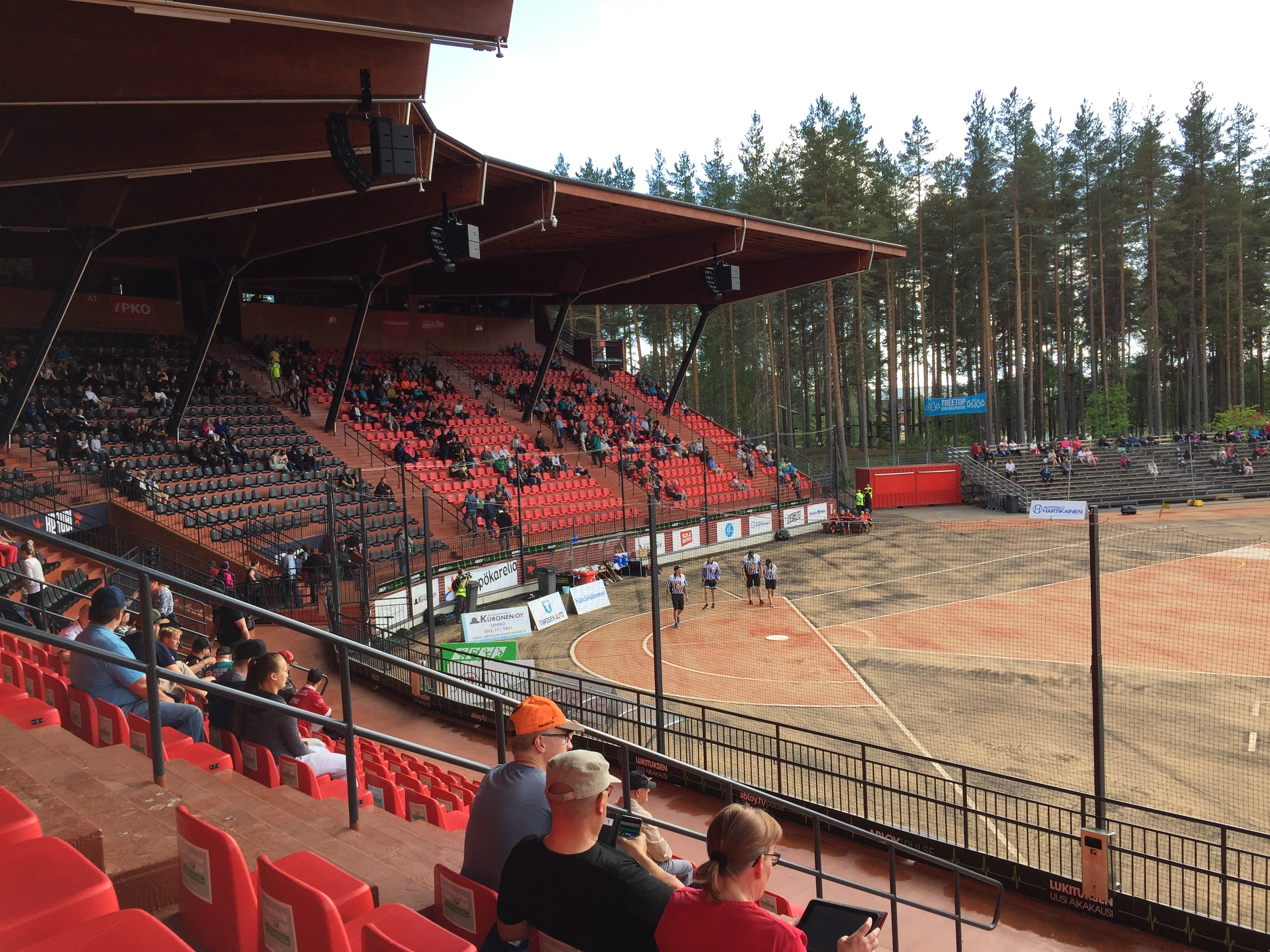
Joensuu JoMa (Kerubi Stadion)

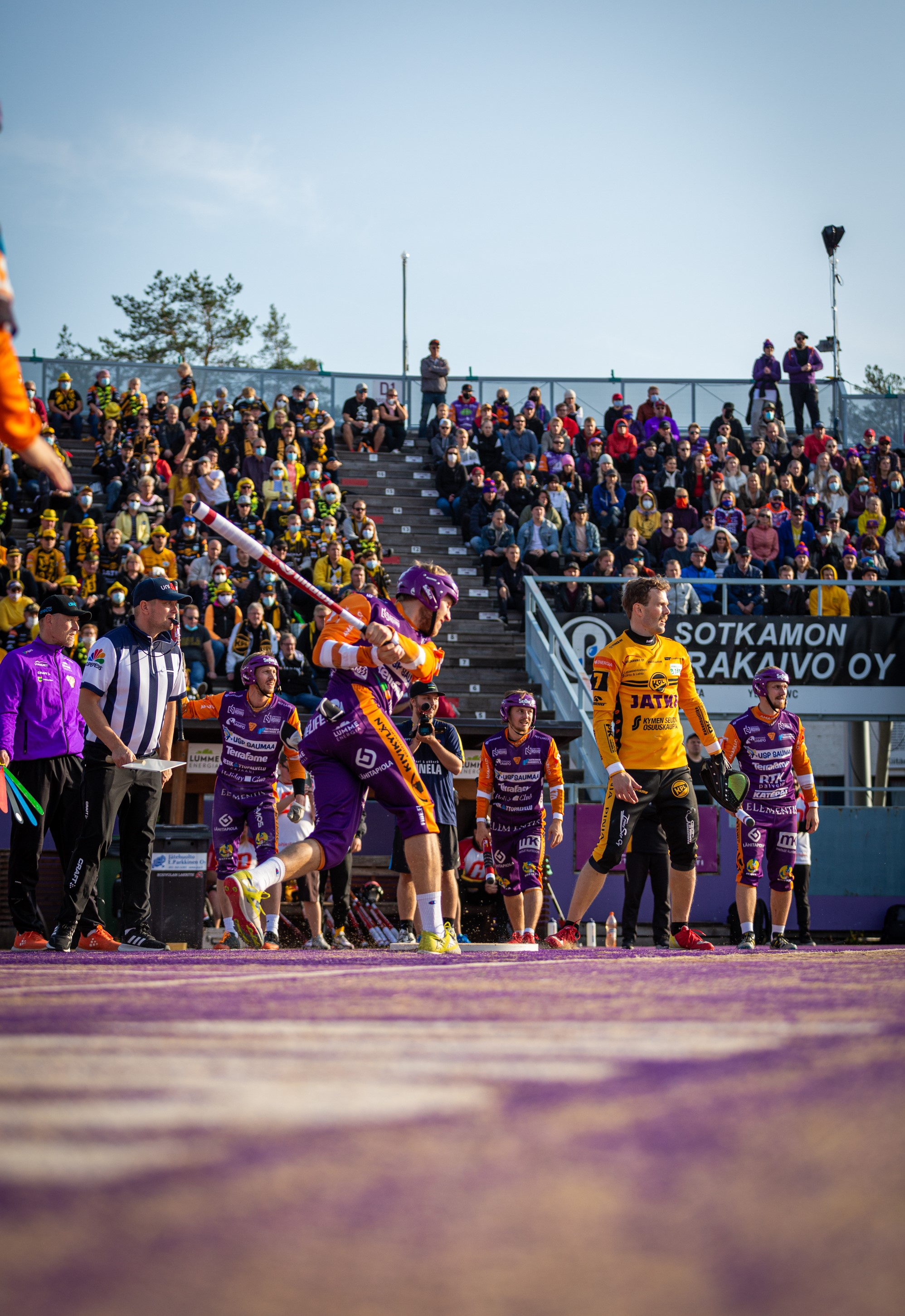
Sotkamon Jymy - Kouvolan Pallonlyöjät in 2020 finals

=== Championship Series 1922–1989 ===
Year	Men	Women
1922	Helsingin Pallonlyöjät, Helsinki	
1923	Helsingin Pallonlyöjät, Helsinki	
1924	Helsingin Pallonlyöjät, Helsinki	
1925	Lahden Suojeluskunta, Lahti	
1926	Helsingin Pallonlyöjät, Helsinki	
1927	Helsingin Pallonlyöjät, Helsinki	
1928	Viipurin Pallonlyöjät, Vyborg	
1929	Lahden Maila-Veikot, Lahti	
1930	Lahden Maila-Veikot, Lahti	
1931	Lahden Maila-Veikot, Lahti	Lahden Maila-Veikot, Lahti
1932	Lahden Maila-Veikot, Lahti	Helsingin Pallonlyöjät, Helsinki
1933	Riihimäen Pallonlyöjät, Riihimäki	Tampereen Pyrintö, Tampere
1934	Helsingin Pallonlyöjät, Helsinki	Viipurin Pallonlyöjät, Vyborg
1935	Kuusankosken Veto, Kuusankoski	Tampereen Pyrintö, Tampere
1936	Hämeenlinnan Pallokerho, Hämeenlinna	Tampereen Pyrintö, Tampere
1937	Kuusankosken Veto, Kuusankoski	Tampereen Pyrintö, Tampere
1938	Helsingin Pallonlyöjät, Helsinki	Katajanokan Haukat, Helsinki
1939	Haminan Palloilijat, Hamina	Katajanokan Haukat, Helsinki
1940	Kuusankosken Veto, Kuusankoski	Katajanokan Haukat, Helsinki
1941	cancelled	cancelled
1942	Valtion lentokonetehdas, Tampere	cancelled
1943	Haminan Palloilijat, Hamina	cancelled
1944	cancelled	cancelled
1945	Toijalan Pallo-Veikot, Toijala	cancelled
1946	Toijalan Pallo-Veikot, Toijala	Katajanokan Haukat, Helsinki
1947	Haminan Palloilijat, Hamina	Vimppelin Veto, Vimpeli
1948	Haminan Palloilijat, Hamina	Vimppelin Veto, Vimpeli
1949	Lahden Maila-Veikot, Lahti	Lahden Koripalloilijat, Lahti
1950	Lahden Maila-Veikot, Lahti	Helsingin Pallo-Toverit, Helsinki
1951	Lahden Maila-Veikot, Lahti	Helsingin Pallo-Toverit, Helsinki
1952	Lahden Maila-Veikot, Lahti	Helsingin Pallo-Toverit, Helsinki
1953	Jyväskylän Kiri, Jyväskylä	Helsingin Pallo-Toverit, Helsinki
1954	Haminan Palloilijat, Hamina	Helsingin Pallo-Toverit, Helsinki
1955	Haminan Palloilijat, Hamina	Kelta-Mustat, Kuopio
1956	Jyväskylän Kiri, Jyväskylä	Helsingin Pallo-Toverit, Helsinki
1957	Jyväskylän Kiri, Jyväskylä	Jyväskylän Kiri, Jyväskylä
1958	Jyväskylän Kiri, Jyväskylä	Helsingin Pallo-Toverit, Helsinki
1959	Helsingin Pallo-Toverit, Helsinki	Helsingin Pallo-Toverit, Helsinki
1960	Vimpelin Veto, Vimpeli	Työväen Mailapojat, Helsinki
1961	Ilmajoen Kisailijat, Ilmajoki	Työväen Mailapojat, Helsinki
1962	Ilmajoen Kisailijat, Ilmajoki	Työväen Mailapojat, Helsinki
1963	Sotkamon Jymy, Sotkamo	Helsingin Pallo-Toverit, Helsinki
1964	Jyväskylän Kiri. Jyväskylä	Helsingin Pallo-Toverit, Helsinki
1965	Vimpelin Veto, Vimpeli	Helsingin Pallo-Toverit, Helsinki
1966	Kouvolan Pallonlyöjät, Kouvola	Helsingin Pallo-Toverit, Helsinki
1967	Kouvolan Pallonlyöjät, Kouvola	Työväen Mailapojat, Helsinki
1968	Kouvolan Pallonlyöjät, Kouvola	Työväen Mailapojat, Helsinki
1969	Kouvolan Pallonlyöjät, Kouvola	Työväen Mailapojat, Helsinki
1970	Ulvilan Pesä-Veikot, Ulvila	Puna-Mustat, Helsinki
1971	Oulun Lippo, Oulu	Työväen Mailapojat, Helsinki
1972	Oulun Lippo, Oulu	Puna-Mustat, Helsinki
1973	Puna-Mustat, Helsinki	Työväen Mailapojat, Helsinki
1974	Haminan Palloilijat, Hamina	Puna-Mustat, Helsinki
1975	Seinäjoen Maila-Jussit, Seinäjoki	Puna-Mustat, Helsinki
1976	Kouvolan Pallonlyöjät, Kouvola	Puna-Mustat, Helsinki
1977	Imatran Pallo-Veikot, Imatra	Seinäjoen Maila-Jussit, Seinäjoki
1978	Imatran Pallo-Veikot, Imatra	Lapuan Virkiä, Lapua
1979	Hyvinkään Tahko, Hyvinkää	Hyvinkään Tahko, Hyvinkää
1980	Hyvinkään Tahko, Hyvinkää	Riihimäen Pallonlyöjät, Riihimäki
1981	Hyvinkään Tahko, Hyvinkää	Riihimäen Pallonlyöjät, Riihimäki
1982	Jyväskylän Kiri, Jyväskylä	Lännen Pallo, Turku
1983	Seinäjoen Maila-Jussit, Seinäjoki	Hyvinkään Tahko, Hyvinkää
1984	Jyväskylän Kiri, Jyväskylä	Mansen Pesäpallo, Tampere
1985	Seinäjoen Maila-Jussit, Seinäjoki	Ikaalisten Tarmo, Ikaalinen
1986	Imatran Pallo-Veikot, Imatra	Ikaalisten Tarmo, Ikaalinen
1987	Seinäjoen Maila-Jussit, Seinäjoki	Ikaalisten Tarmo, Ikaalinen
1988	Alajärven Ankkurit, Alajärvi	Lapuan Virkiä, Lapua
1989	Alajärven Ankkurit, Alajärvi	Jyväskylän Kiri, Jyväskylä

=== Superpesis ===
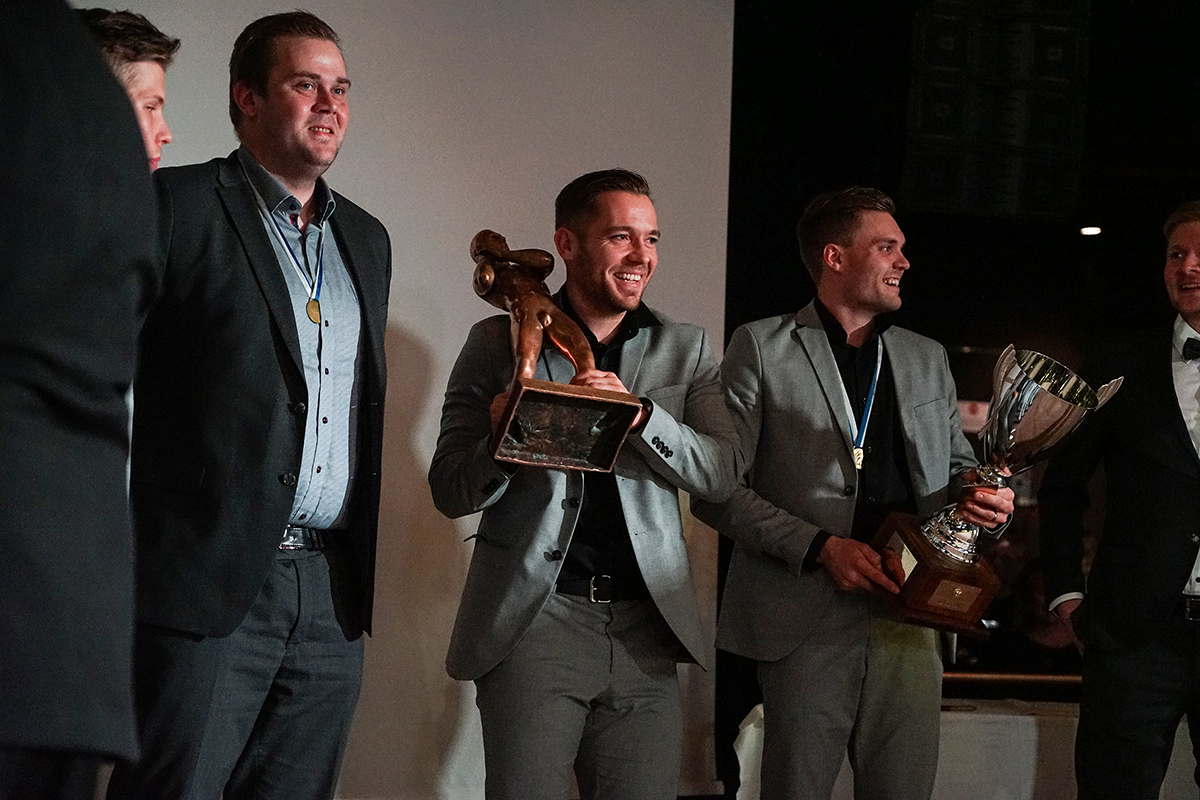
Superpesis champion trophy

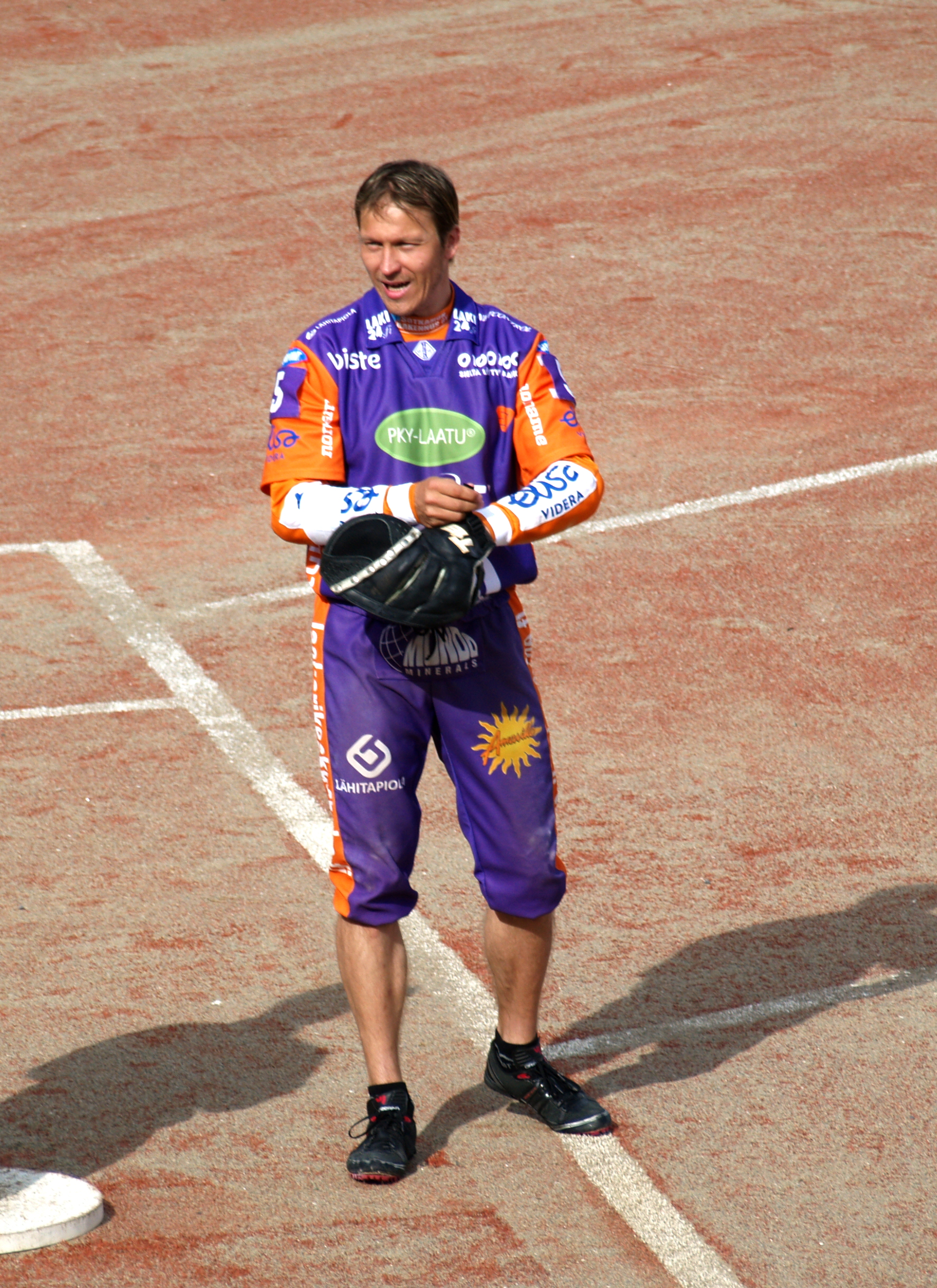
Toni Kohonen is one of Finland's most successful pesäpallo player of all time.

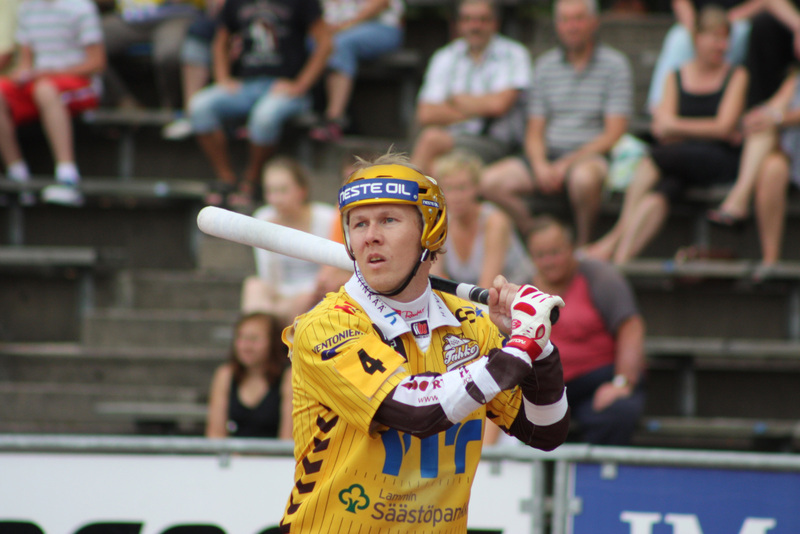
Player of the Year 2012 and Hyvinkää Tahko franchise's player Juha Korhonen

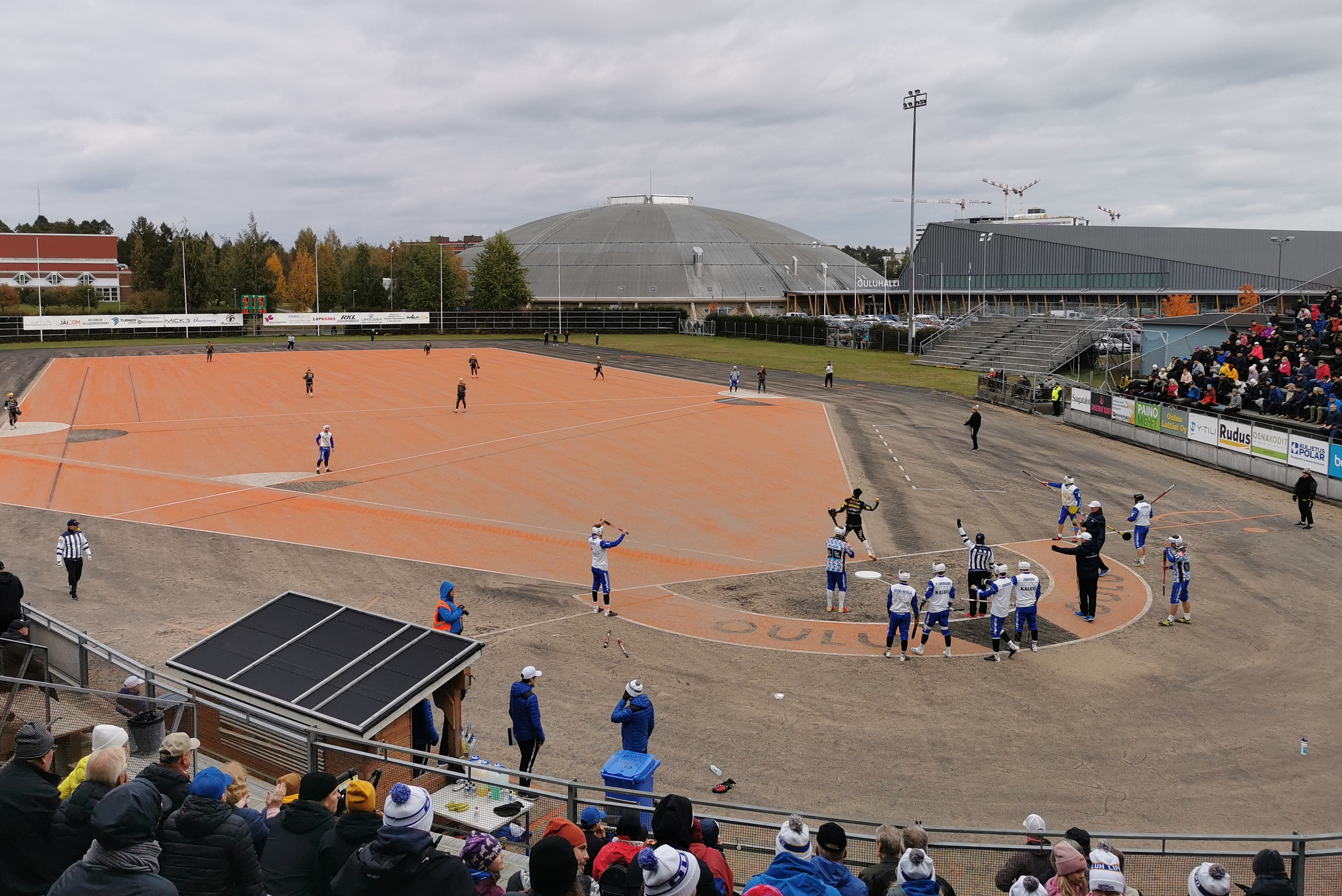
Decisive promotion qualifying match to Superpesis, Oulu Lippo against SiiPe in the 2020–21 season

Year	Men	Women
1990	Sotkamon Jymy, Sotkamo	Viinijärven Urheilijat, Viinijärvi
1991	Imatran Pallo-Veikot, Imatra	Ikaalisten Tarmo, Ikaalinen
1992	Sotkamon Jymy, Sotkamo	Lapuan Virkiä, Lapua
1993	Sotkamon Jymy, Sotkamo	Lapuan Virkiä, Lapua
1994	Oulun Lippo, Oulu	Oulun Lippo, Oulu
1995	Sotkamon Jymy, Sotkamo	Oulun Lippo, Oulu
1996	Sotkamon Jymy, Sotkamo	Jyväskylän Kiri, Jyväskylä
1997	Sotkamon Jymy, Sotkamo	Jyväskylän Kiri, Jyväskylä
1998	Oulun Lippo, Oulu	Vihdin Pallo, Vihti
1999	Kiteen Pallo -90, Kitee	Siilinjärven Pesis, Siilinjärvi
2000	Kiteen Pallo -90, Kitee	Pattijoen Urheilijat, Pattijoki
2001	Sotkamon Jymy, Sotkamo	Lapuan Virkiä, Lapua
2002	Sotkamon Jymy, Sotkamo	Pesäkarhut, Pori
2003	Sotkamon Jymy, Sotkamo	Jyväskylän Kirittäret, Jyväskylä
2004	Sotkamon Jymy, Sotkamo	Lapuan Virkiä, Lapua
2005	Kiteen Pallo -90, Kitee	Jyväskylän Kirittäret, Jyväskylä
2006	Sotkamon Jymy, Sotkamo	Jyväskylän Kirittäret, Jyväskylä
2007	Hyvinkään Tahko, Hyvinkää	Jyväskylän Kirittäret, Jyväskylä
2008	Pattijoen Urheilijat, Raahe	Jyväskylän Kirittäret, Jyväskylä
2009	Sotkamon Jymy, Sotkamo	Jyväskylän Kirittäret, Jyväskylä
2010	Vimpelin Veto, Vimpeli	Jyväskylän Kirittäret, Jyväskylä
2011	Sotkamon Jymy, Sotkamo	Lapuan Virkiä, Lapua
2012	Sotkamon Jymy, Sotkamo	Lapuan Virkiä, Lapua
2013	Sotkamon Jymy, Sotkamo	Lapuan Virkiä, Lapua
2014	Sotkamon Jymy, Sotkamo	Lapuan Virkiä, Lapua
2015	Sotkamon Jymy, Sotkamo	Lapuan Virkiä, Lapua
2016	Vimpelin Veto, Vimpeli	Jyväskylän Kirittäret, Jyväskylä
2017	Vimpelin Veto, Vimpeli	Manse PP, Tampere
2018	Joensuun Maila, Joensuu	Jyväskylän Kirittäret, Jyväskylä
2019	Joensuun Maila, Joensuu	Jyväskylän Kirittäret, Jyväskylä
2020	Sotkamon Jymy, Sotkamo	Jyväskylän Kirittäret, Jyväskylä
2021	Manse PP, Tampere	Pesäkarhut, Pori
2022	Vimpelin Veto, Vimpeli	Jyväskylän Kirittäret, Jyväskylä
2023	Sotkamon Jymy, Sotkamo	Pesäkarhut, Pori
2024	Sotkamon Jymy, Sotkamo	Manse PP, Tampere
2025	Manse PP, Tampere	Sotkamon Jymy, Sotkamo

== Talvisuper ==
Talvisuper is the main winter competition in pesäpallo. Although treated as a separate competition from Superpesis, it features many of the same teams, along with a few teams from Ykköspesis. The competition runs from December through April.

In contrast to the main Superpesis, where matches are generally held at stadiums dedicated solely to pesäpallo, Talvisuper is mostly held in indoor halls with artificial grass, with the halls being designed primarily for association football and occasionally track and field.

The finals of Talvisuper are known as Halli-SM (Hall Finnish Championship).

== Attendances ==
The men's Superpesis clubs in the table are listed by average home attendance in 2023. The average attendance was 986. 474,866 people attended the men's and women's Superpesis games in 2023. These figures include both regular season matches from the men's and women's competitions as well as the play-offs.

#	Club	City	Average attendance
1	Joensuun Maila	Joensuu	1,685
2	Sotkamon Jymy	Sotkamo	1,230
3	Kouvolan Pallonlyöjät	Kouvola	1,228
4	Kiteen Pallo	Kitee	1,189
5	Vimpelin Veto	Vimpeli	949
6	JymyJussit	Seinäjoki	927
7	Tahko	Hyvinkää	922
8	IPV	Imatra	785
9	Kempeleen Kiri	Kempele	784
10	Pattijoen Urheilijat	Raahe	767
11	Manse PP	Tampere	765
12	Kankaanpään Maila	Kankaanpää	588
13	Koskenkorvan Urheilijat	Koskenkorva	581
14	Siilinjärven Pesis	Siilinjärvi	534

== See also ==
- Finnish pesäpallo match-fixing scandal
