= Vaasan Mailattaret =

Finnish pesäpallo team

Information
- League: Superpesis
- Location: Vaasa, Finland
- Ballpark: Hietalahti Pesäpallo Stadium
- Founded: 2015
- Colors: blue, orange, white
- Ownership: Vaasan Mailattaret ry
- Manager: Pekka Mäntymaa
- Website: www.mailattaret.fi

Vaasan Mailattaret is a Finnish women's pesäpallo team from Vaasa. It was founded in 2015. Vaasan Mailattaret is playing in the top-tier women's Superpesis.

The home ground of Vaasan Mailattaret is the Hietalahti Pesäpallo Stadium.
