= Roihuttaret =

Finnish pesäpallo team

Information
- League: Superpesis
- Location: Helsinki, Finland
- Ballpark: Roihuvuori Pesäpallo stadium
- Founded: 1957
- Colors: blue, white
- Ownership: Roihu ry
- Manager: Jyrki Pellonperä
- Website: roihu.fi

Roihuttaret is a women's Finnish baseball team from Helsinki. It was founded in 1958. Roihuttaret is playing in the top-tier women's Superpesis.

== Roihuvuori Field ==
Roihuvuori Field
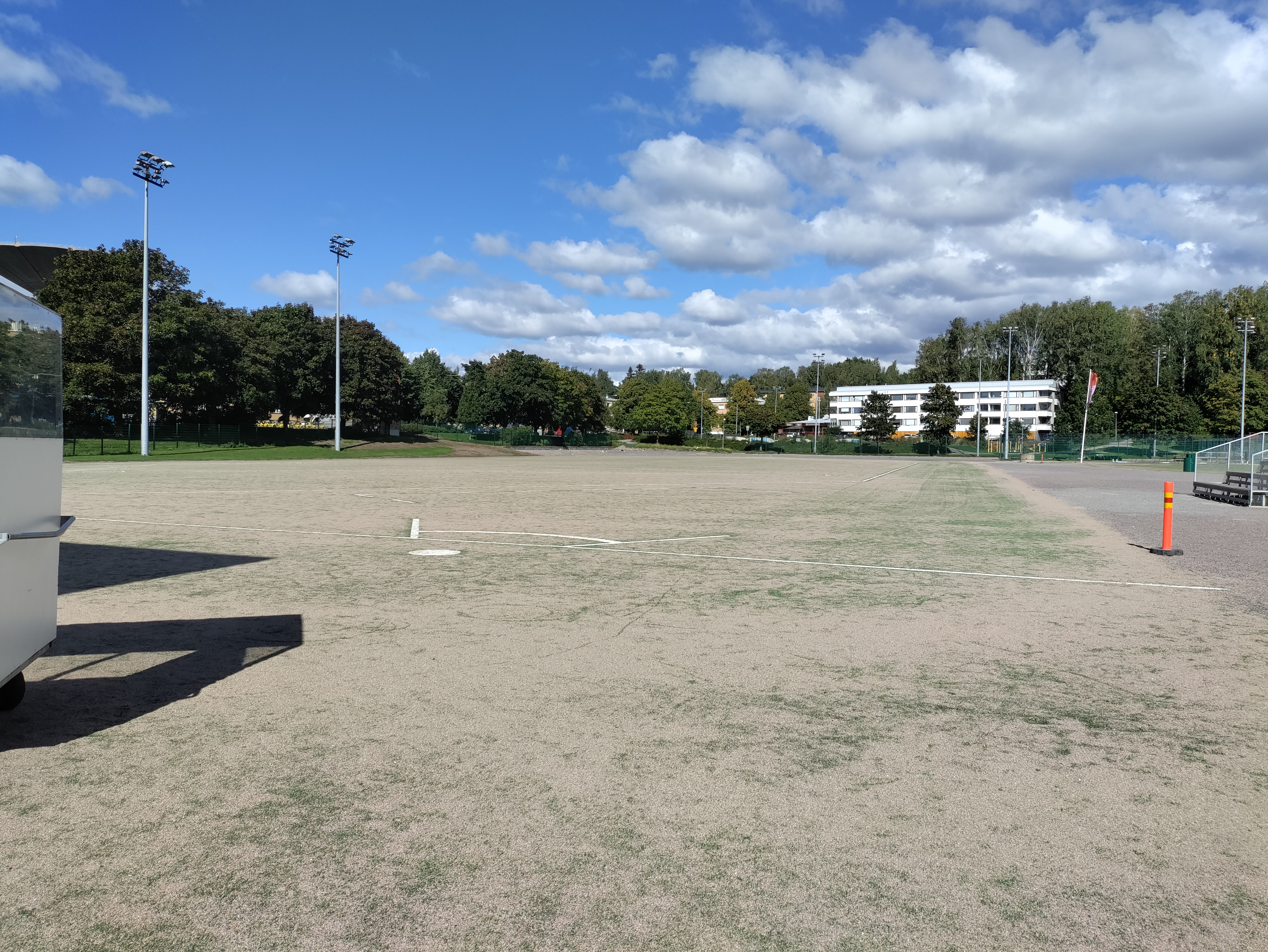
- Roihuvuori Field at 2021.

- Location within Uusimaa Location within Finland Location within Europe
- Address: Satumaanpolku 4; 00820 Helsinki
- Location: Helsinki, Finland
- Coordinates: 60.195336°N 25.055656°E
- Owner: City of Helsinki
- Capacity: 450
- Public transit: Porolahden koulu / Satumaanpolku, HSL lines 80, 82, 83

Construction
- Opened: 2021

Tenant
- Roihuttaret

Roihuvuori Field (Finnish: Roihuvuoren pesäpallokenttä, Swedish: Kasbergets idrottspark) is a Finnish baseball ( pesäpallo) stadium located in Helsinki, Finland. Since its opening it has been the home field of the Roihuttaret.

The Roihuvuori field was renovated in 2021. The baseball stadium has received much praise for its functionality.

== Achievements ==
Key results in the Superpesis:

Winners	Second place	Third place
–	1982, 1985, 1986, 1988	–
