= Kankaanpään Maila =

Finnish pesäpallo team

Information
- League: Ykköspesis
- Location: Kankaanpää, Finland
- Ballpark: Pohjanlinna Stadium
- Founded: 1958
- Colors: blue, orange, white
- Ownership: Kankaanpään Maila ry
- Manager: Atte Hakala
- Website: oulunlippo.fi

Kankaanpään Maila is a Finnish pesäpallo team from Kankaanpää. It was founded in 1958. Kankaanpään Maila is playing in the second-tier Ykköspesis.

The home ground of Kankaanpään Maila is the Pohjanlinna Stadium.

== History ==
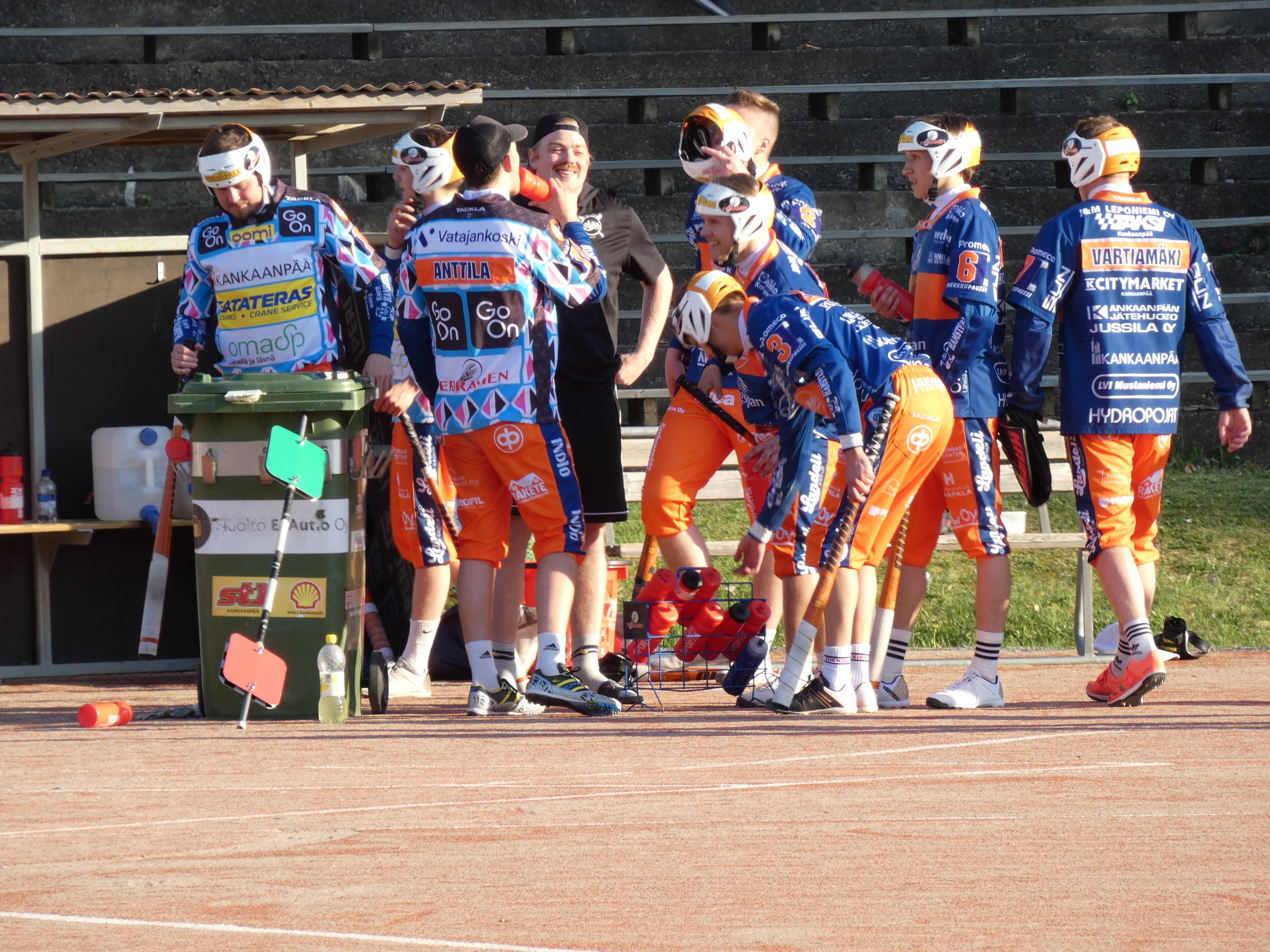
Kankaanpään Maila at 2023.

Kankanpään Maila was founded in 1958 and was promoted to the championship in 1968. Its blood rival and big brother in the early days was Ulvilan Pesä-Veikot. Ulvila won the Finnish championship in 1970, but the following year Kankaanpää overtook them to take silver. That was also the beginning of the club's years of success.

However, the club did not win the Finnish championship. The great years of the 1970s are remembered for two silver and two bronze medals - as well as Seppo Uusi-Oukari's six batting titles and Jorma Pajunen's four forwards titles.

Although the club has only won one medal since the 1970s (bronze in 1988), it has remained firmly on the pesäpallo map. Kankaanpään maila has 42 major league seasons. The club has played in the major league continuously since the late 1960s, with the exception of a few isolated breaks and one longer one (2003–2010) After returning to the Superpesis in 2011, the club built a strong team and finished sixth in the regular season. However, that ranking has remained the best of the newcomers.

Kankaanpään Maila was known for its localism in the 70s. The teams were largely made up of the club's own juniors. KaMa has always been a strong junior club, with no fewer than 58 medals in junior series, 22 of which have come in the 2010s.

== Achievements ==
Men's Pesäpallo

Superpesis

Type	Trophy	Titles	Seasons
Finnish championship	Second place	2	1971, 1972
Finnish championship	Third place	3	1969, 1975, 1988
