= Pesäkarhut =

Finnish pesäpallo club from Pori, Finland

- Sport: Pesäpallo
- Founded: 1985
- League: Superpesis
- Based in: Pori, Finland
- Home ground: Porin pesäpallostadion
- Colours
- Championships: 2002, 2021, 2023

Uniforms
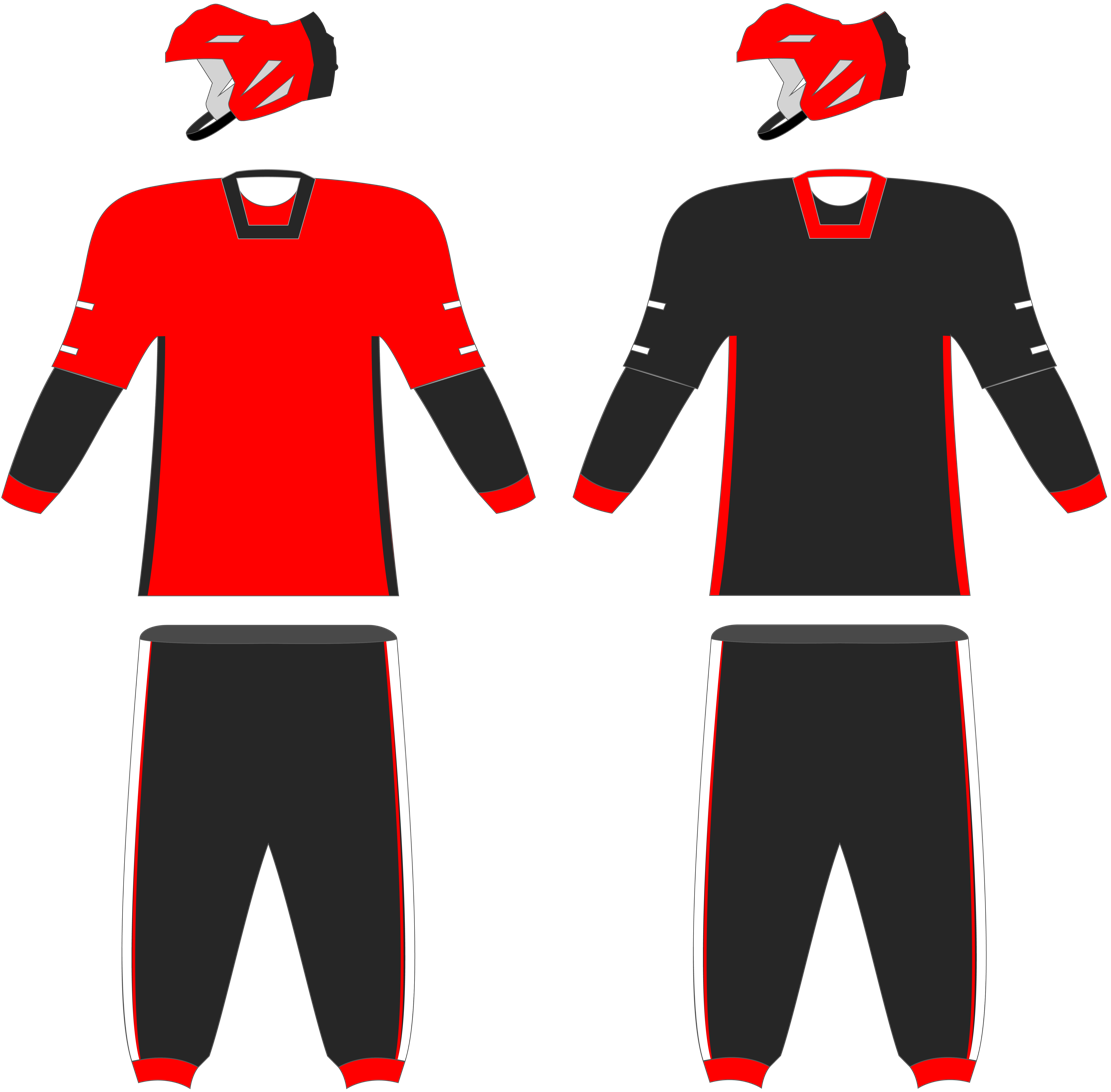

Porin Pesäkarhut (lit. "Pori Basebears") are a women's pesäpallo club based in Pori, Finland, that plays in the top-tier of Finland, the Superpesis. The club was established in 1985. They play in the Pori Pesäpallo Stadium. They have won the Finnish Championship three times, in 2002, in 2021 and in 2023.

== Club achievements ==
During its history, the club has won 18 medals in the women's Superpesis. Three of these are gold (2002, 2021 and 2023), six are silver (2005, 2008, 2010, 2013, 2017 and 2019) and ten are bronze (2001, 2004, 2006, 2009, 2011, 2012, 2014, 2016, 2018) and 2020). Pesäkarhut have won the Halli-SM, a winter pesäpallo tournament, in 2002, 2007, 2009, 2011, 2017, 2018 and 2019.

== Award winning players ==
Etenijäkuningatar:

- Carita Toiviainen (2007)
- Kaisa Kärkkäinen (2010)
- Milla Lindström (2013, 2017)
- Emilia Itävalo (2021)

Lyöjäkuningatar:

- Heidi Kuusisto (2010)
- Hanna Itävalo (2013)
- Susanna Puisto (2020, 2021)

Kärkilyöntikuningatar:

- Hanna Itävalo (2009, 2010)
- Kaisa Kärkkäinen (2011)
- Carita Toiviainen (2013, 2015)

Playoffs' most valuable player:

- Tiia Peltonen (2021)

"Jokeri" of the year:
- Johanna Nieminen (2002)
- Tanja Vehniäinen (2005)
- Heidi Kuusisto (2007, 2008, 2010)

"Lukkari" of the year:

- Kaisa Salmela (2012)

Baseballer of the year:

- Jonna Äijälä (2002)
- Kaisa Kärkkäinen (2010)
- Carita Toiviainen (2013)
- Susanne Ojaniemi (2017)
- Emilia Itävalo (2019)

Kultainen maila- award:
- Hanna Itävalo (2009)
- Susanne Ojaniemi (2017)

Kultainen räpylä- award:

- Susanne Ojaniemi (2017)
- Emilia Itävalo (2019)
