= Kiteen Pallo -90 =

Finnish pesäpallo club

Information
- League: Superpesis
- Location: Kitee, Finland
- Ballpark: Shore Field
- Founded: 1990
- Colors: red, black, white
- Ownership: Kiteen Pallo -90 ry
- Manager: Sami Partanen
- Website: kipa90.com

Kiteen Pallo -90 (lit. "Ball of Kitee") is a Finnish professional pesäpallo team from Kitee. It was founded in 1990. Kiteen Pallo -90 is playing in the top-tier Superpesis.

Kiteen Pallo -90 has won the men's Finnish Pesäpallo Championship (Superpesis) three times in 1999, 2000 and 2005. The home ground of Kiteen Pallo -90 is the Shore Field.

== Achievements ==
Men's Pesäpallo

Superpesis

Winners	Second place	Third place
1999, 2000, 2005	1997, 2001, 2004	1998
