= Joensuun Maila =

Finnish pesäpallo team

- Logo

Information
- League: Superpesis
- Location: Joensuu, Finland
- Ballpark: Ilosaarirock Stadium
- Founded: 1958
- Colors: red, black
- Ownership: Super-JoMa Oy
- Manager: Markku Hylkilä
- Website: joensuunmaila.fi

Joensuun Maila (lit. "Bat of Joensuu") is a Finnish professional pesäpallo team from Joensuu. It was founded in 1958. Joensuun Maila is playing in the top-tier Superpesis.

Joensuun Maila has won the men's Finnish Pesäpallo Championship (Superpesis) two times in years 2018 and 2019. The home ground of Joensuun Maila is the Mehtimäki Stadium.

== Achievements ==
Men's Pesäpallo

Superpesis

Winners	Second place	Third place
2018, 2019	–	2013, 2014, 2015, 2016, 2017, 2022
