= Lapuan Virkiä =

Finnish sports club

- Full name: Lapuan Virkiä
- Nickname(s): Virkiä
- Founded: 1907
- Ground: Lapuan keskuskenttä, Lapua, Finland
- Chairman: Seppo Saranpää
- Coach: Topias Tervasmäki
- League: Kolmonen
Home colours

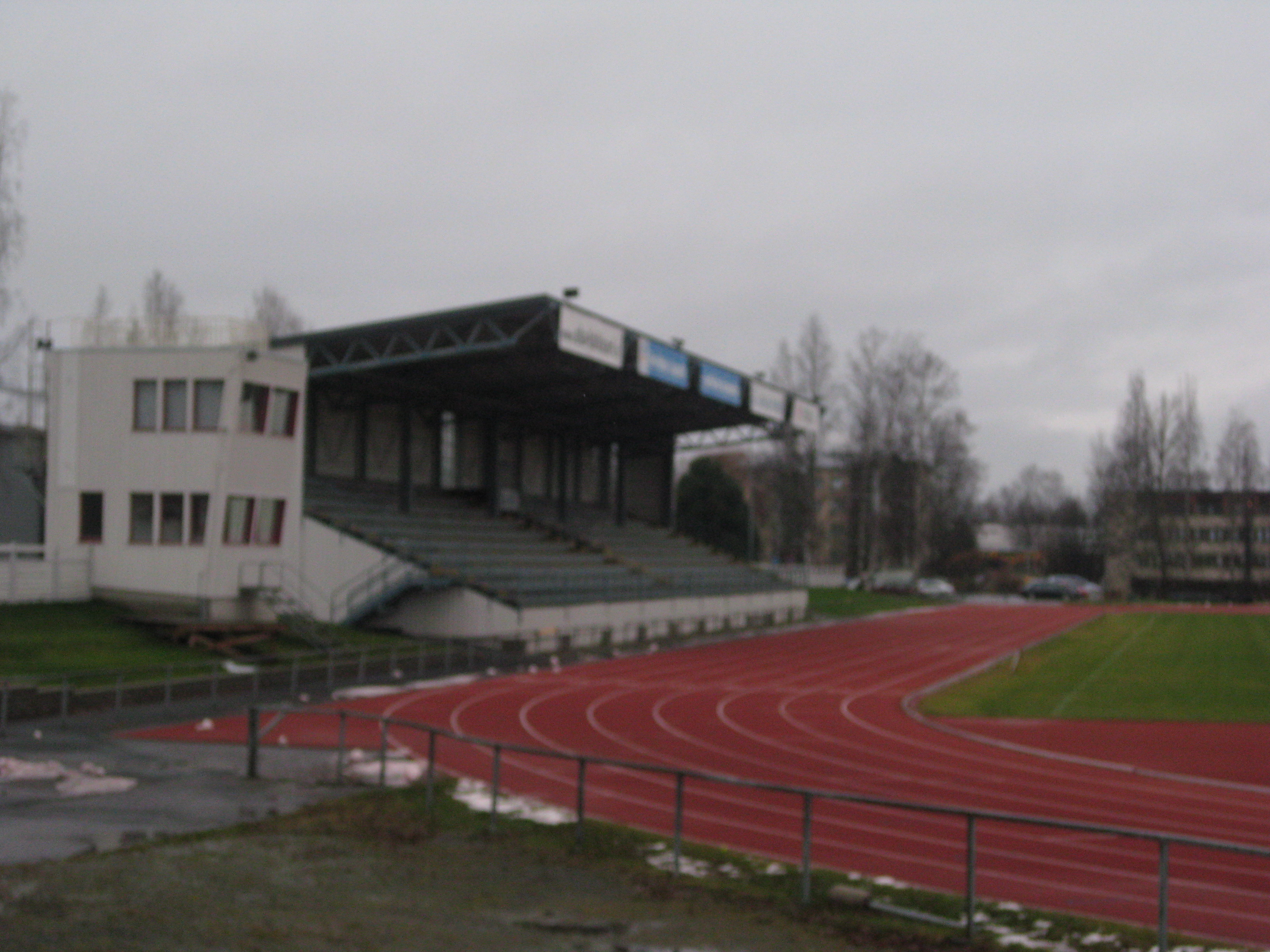
Lapuan keskuskenttä

Lapuan Virkiä (abbreviated Virkiä) is a sports club from Lapua, Finland. The club was formed in 1907 and currently operates 11 divisions namely skiing, football, ice hockey, volleyball, wrestling, basketball, slalom, orienteering, swimming, fitness and athletics. Another sport that the club excels at is pesäpallo. The men's football first team currently plays in the Kolmonen (Third Division). Their home ground is at the Lapuan keskuskenttä.

== Background ==
Virkiä was established in 1907 and most of the time have played in the lower levels of Finnish football. Their key achievement has been one season in the Suomensarja (Finland League), the second tier of Finnish football in 1964. They also have had five spells covering 14 seasons in the third tier, the Kakkonen (Second Division), in 1981–88, 1997, 2000, 2004–06 and 2009. In this respect the club have enjoyed their greatest success over the last decade as they have spent 5 seasons in the Kakkonen (Second Division).

== Season to season ==
Season	Level	Division	Section	Administration	Position	Movements
2003	Tier 4	Kolmonen (Third Division)	Section 10	Vaasa District (SPL Vaasa)	1st	Upper Section -1st – Promoted
2004	Tier 3	Kakkonen (Second Division)	East Group	Finnish FA (Suomen Pallolitto)	8th	
2005	Tier 3	Kakkonen (Second Division)	West Group	Finnish FA (Suomen Pallolitto)	10th	Relegation Play-offs
2006	Tier 3	Kakkonen (Second Division)	Group C	Finnish FA (Suomen Pallolitto)	14th	Relegated
2007	Tier 4	Kolmonen (Third Division)		Vaasa District (SPL Vaasa)	7th	
2008	Tier 4	Kolmonen (Third Division)		Central Ostrobothnia and Vaasa (SPL Vaasa)	Kesä 3rd	Syksy 1st – Play-offs – Promoted
2009	Tier 3	Kakkonen (Second Division)	Group C	Finnish FA (Suomen Pallolitto)	14th	Relegated
2010	Tier 4	Kolmonen (Third Division)		Central Ostrobothnia and Vaasa (SPL Vaasa)		

- 4 seasons in Kakkonen
- 4 seasons in Kolmonen

== Club structure ==
Lapuan Virkiä run a large number of teams including 2 men's teams, 1 ladies team, 7 boys teams and 6 girls teams.
