= Pattijoen Urheilijat =

Finnish pesäpallo team

Information
- League: Superpesis
- Location: Raahe, Finland
- Ballpark: Rännäri Stadium
- Founded: 1928
- League championships: 1 (Men), 1 (Women)
- Colors: black, yellow, grey
- Ownership: Pattijoen Urheilijat ry
- Manager: Perttu Westersund
- Website: www.pattu.fi

Pattijoen Urheilijat (lit. "Pattijoki Athletes") is a Finnish professional pesäpallo team from Raahe. It was founded in 1928. Pattijoen Urheilijat is playing in the top-tier Superpesis.

Pattijoen Urheilijat has won the men's Finnish Pesäpallo Championship (Superpesis) in 2008. The home ground of Pattijoen Urheilijat is the Rännäri Stadium.

== History ==
Pattijoen Urheilijat was founded as a general club back in 1928, but pesäpallo was in decline for a long time until it was relaunched in the early 1970s. After that, junior training was also launched.

Pattijoki initially played in the provincial league. It was promoted to the third-tier in 1986 and to the tier 2 Ykköspesis in 1991. In the autumn of 1993, Pattijoki celebrated its promotion to Superpesis with a team built around Jarkko Kokko, Sami Ahola and Timo Lemponen.

Pattijoki first played in Superpesis for only two seasons before being relegated to Ykköspesis. At the same time, the club produced many talented players. Jarkko Kokko moved to Sotkamo in 1995 and was named Pesäpallo Player of the Year in his inaugural season. Sami Ahola moved to Kitee in the autumn of 1995 and won the Superpesis batting title four years in a row.

After one season in Ykköspesis, Pattijoki was promoted back to Superpesis and has played continuously in the main league since 1997. Its period of greatness was the first decade of the 2000s and the beginning of the 2010s, when Pattijoki won six medals. The golden decade culminated in the 2008 Finnish championship. Pattijoki also won silver in 2002 and 2006 and bronze in 2001, 2011 and 2012.

Pattijoki women also won the gold medal in 2000. Pattijoki has a total of 25 medals in the junior series, but in the 2010s the junior activity waned until it was pumped back to life.

Pattijoki is recognised as a club for developing local talent, and a platform for many young players. Jarkko Kokko, Sami Haapakoski and Tuomas Jussila all established their professional careers while playing there.

== Achievements ==
Men's Pesäpallo

Superpesis

Type	Trophy	Titles	Seasons
Finnish championship	Winners	1	2008
Finnish championship	Second place	2	2002, 2006
Finnish championship	Third place	3	2001, 2011, 2012

Women's Pesäpallo

Superpesis

Type	Trophy	Titles	Seasons
Finnish championship	Winners	1	2000
