= Vimpelin Veto =

Finnish sports club

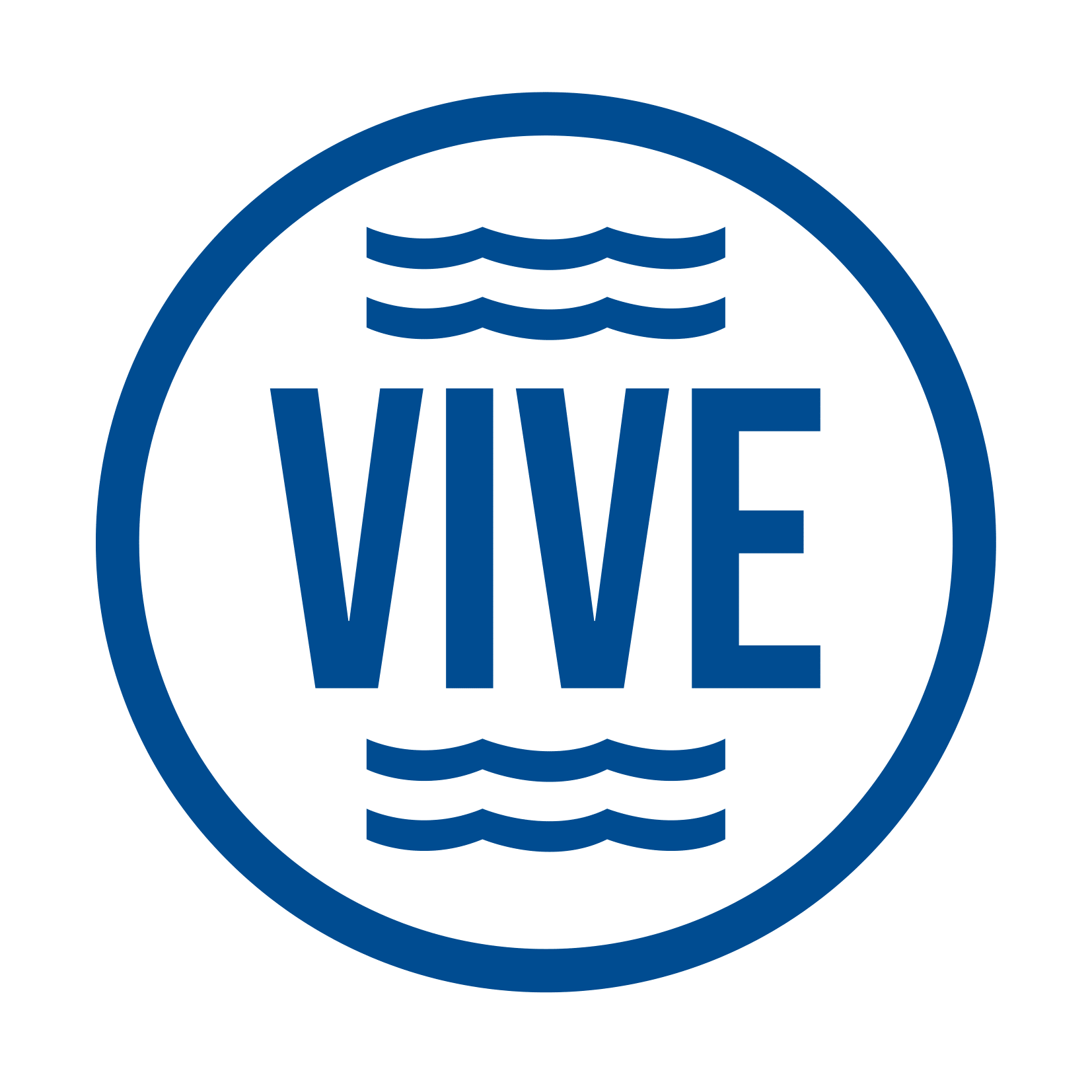
- Logo

Information
- League: Superpesis
- Location: Vimpeli, Finland
- Ballpark: Island Field
- Founded: 1934
- League championships: Superpesis: (7) 1960, 1965, 2010, 2016, 2017, 2022, 2026; Suomen Cup: (2) 1980, 1981
- Colors: blue, white
- Ownership: Vimpelin Veto ry
- Manager: Kari Kleemola
- Website: vimpelinveto.fi

Vimpelin Veto (lit. "Draw of Vimpeli"; or simply Veto) is a Finnish professional pesäpallo team from Vimpeli. It was founded in 1934. Vimpelin Veto is playing in the top-tier Superpesis. Vimpelin Veto has participated in many sports in Finland over the years, such as basketball. Since 2010s, the club's main successes have been in pesäpallo.

Vimpelin Veto has won the men's Finnish Pesäpallo Championship (Superpesis) six times in years 1960, 1965, 2010, 2016, 2017 and 2022. The home ground of Vimpelin Veto is the Island Field. Its well-known rival is Sotkamon Jymy from Sotkamo, a storied rivaly that has become nicknamed "El Klassikko" whenever the two clubs meet.

== History ==
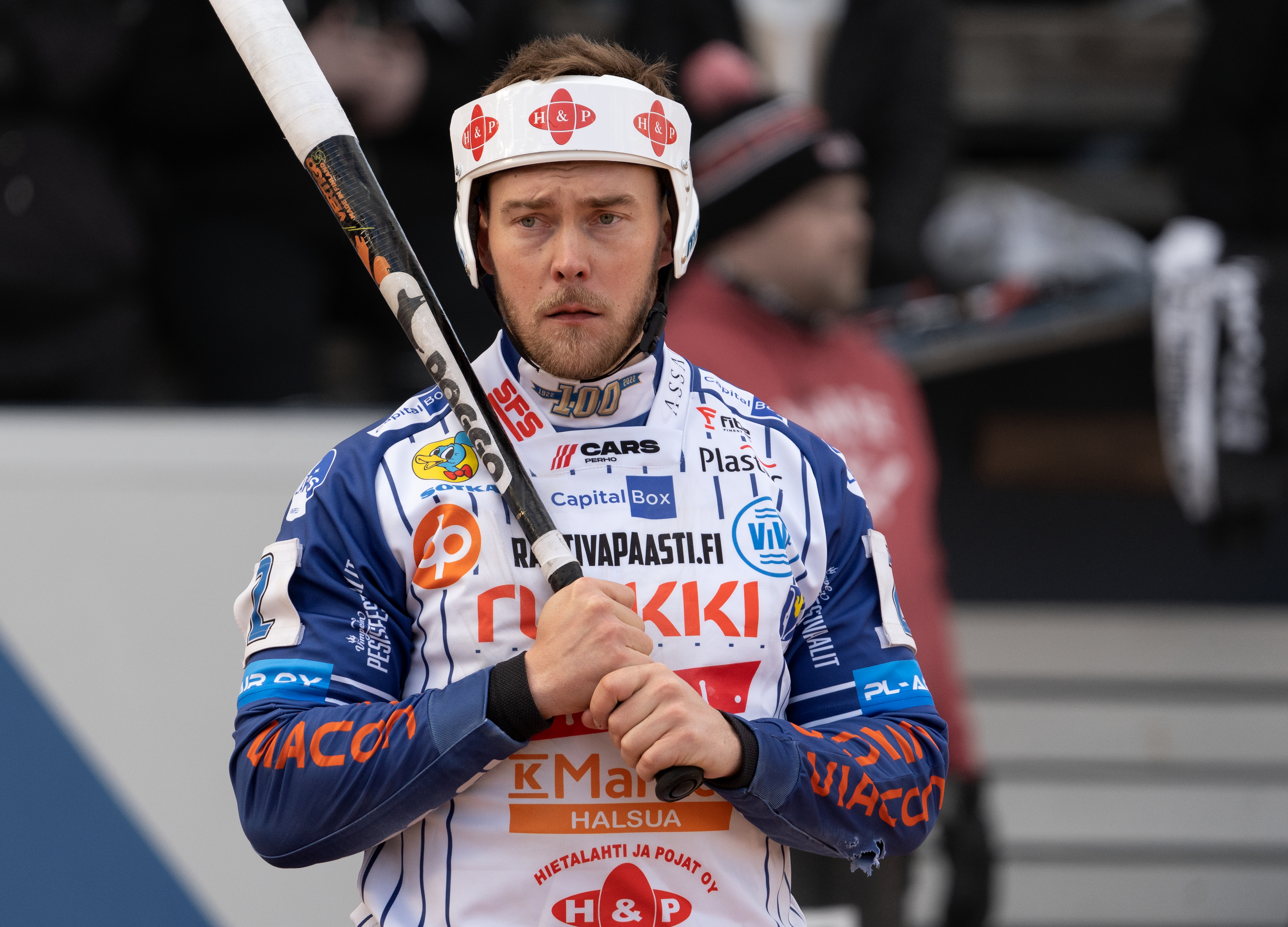
Vimpelin Veto player Mikko Kanala at 2023.

Vimpelin Veto was founded in 1934. Although the club was and still is a general club, it is primarily known for pesäpallo. Vimpeli was promoted to the main league in 1938 and is one of the longest-standing pesäpallo clubs. Vimpeli won its first men's medal in 1940 and celebrated the Finnish championship in 1947 and 1948 and the silver medal in 1949.

Vimpeli's history includes two great seasons of success. The first was between 1958 and 1968, when Vimpeli won medals for 11 consecutive seasons. Vimpeli won the championship in 1960 and 1965, silver in 1959, 1961, 1962 and 1966 and bronze in 1958, 1963, 1964, 1967 and 1968.

Vimpeli won a surprise silver medal in 1975, but otherwise Vimpeli spent a long time in the bottom of the main league, the Ykköspesis and the Suomensarja. A new upswing began in the 2000s.

Vimpeli was promoted back to the Superpesis in the autumn of 2003. After a few seasons of wonderment, things started to happen. Star players like Henri Puputti, Sami Haapakoski, Antti Kuusisto and Jere Dahlström were brought in and the result was inevitable: Vimpeli won bronze in 2009 and a year later the Finnish championship was celebrated at Island Field.

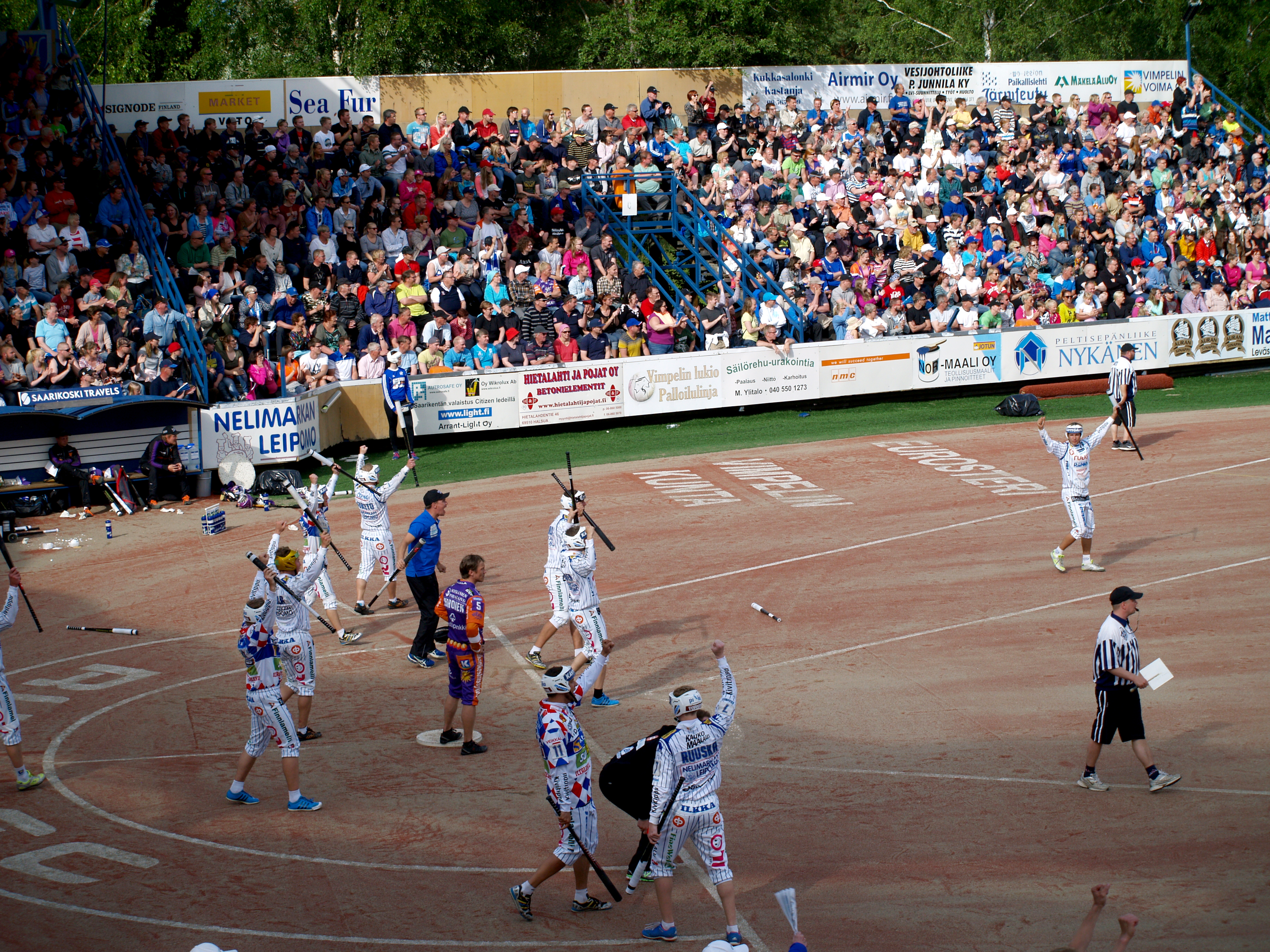
Rivalry between Vimpelin Veto and Sotkamon Jymy at 2015.

In their second successful season since 2009, Vimpeli has won three championships, five silver and four bronze, the latest coming last summer. In total, Vimpeli has won five championships, 10 silver and 12 bronze medals in its history. In the juniors, Vimpeli has won a total of 41 medals. Vimpeli women's top division team won two championship medals during their tenure along with a silver, during the 1940s.

Vimpeli dominated the 2010s with Sotkamon Jymy. Between 2011 and 2017, the teams met in seven consecutive finals. Sotkamo won the first five finals and Vimpeli the last two.

== Culture ==
Vimpeli is a small municipality of only 2,800 inhabitants in South Ostrobothnia. The club plays a strong role in the village. Vimpeli is one of the most traditional places in pesäpallo. Pesäpallo plays a central role in the identity of the local community. The club's home ground has a legendary reputation. The municipality also has a national baseball museum and a pesäpallo statue. The village's Nelimarkka bakery also has a legendary reputation among pesäpallo fans.

Vimpeli has traditionally started its Sunday games at 1 pm (13:00), unlike other places, because pesäpallo and church services have had to be coordinated.

== Achievements ==
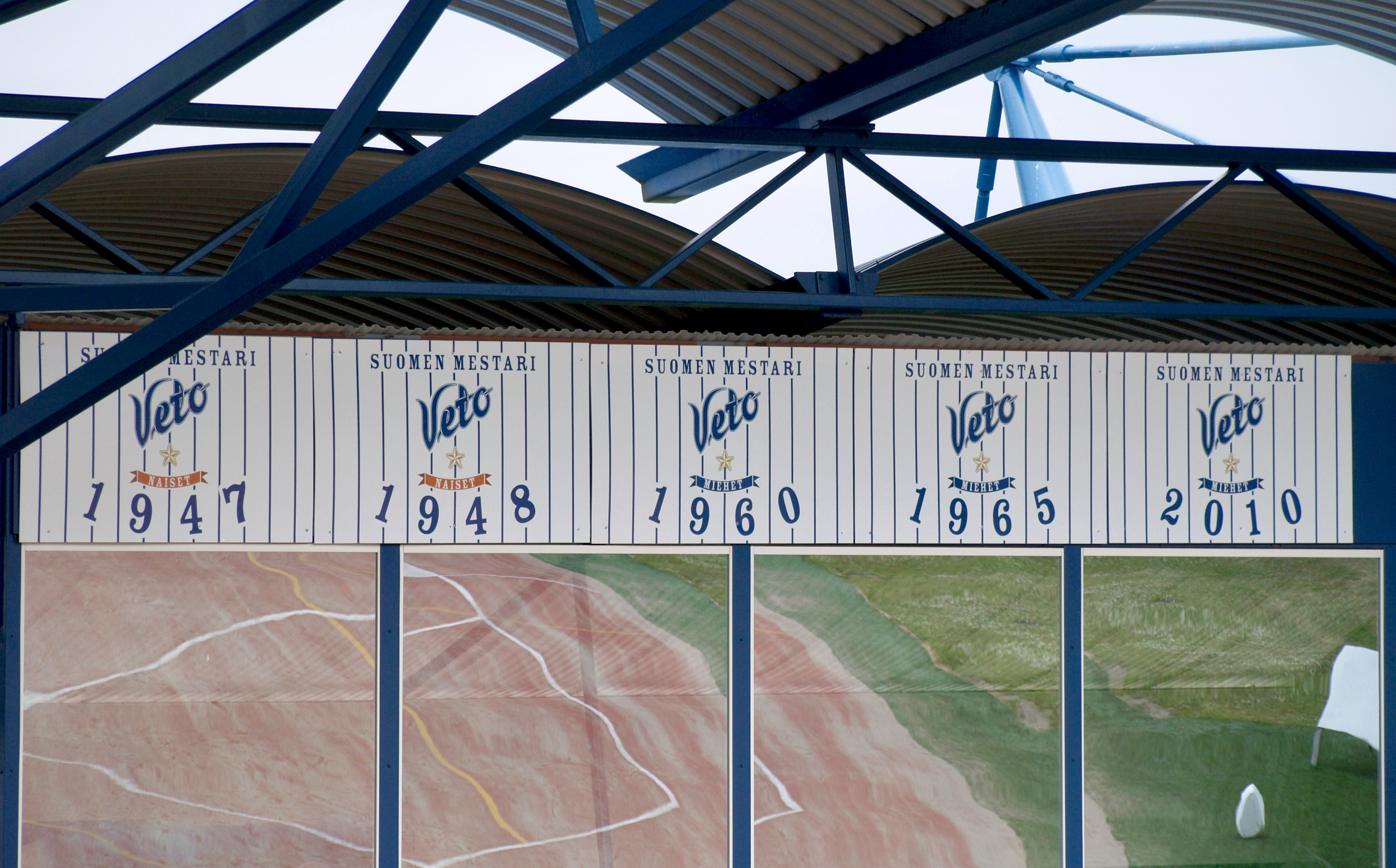
Championship boards on the Island Field.

Men's Pesäpallo

Superpesis

Type	Trophy	Titles	Seasons
Finnish championship	Winners	7	1960, 1965, 2010, 2016, 2017, 2022, 2026
Finnish championship	Second place	11	1959, 1961, 1962, 1966, 1975, 2011, 2012, 2013, 2014, 2015, 2023
Finnish championship	Third place	12	1940, 1946, 1952, 1958, 1963, 1964, 1967, 1968, 2009, 2018, 2020, 2021
