= Lapinjärvi (disambiguation) =

Lapinjärvi is a municipality in Finland.

Lapinjärvi may also refer to:

- Lapinjärvi (village), the largest village and administrative center of Lapinjärvi municipality
- Lapinjärvi (lake), a lake in Lapinjärvi
- Other lakes by this name:
  - Lapinjärvi (Hämeenlinna), a lake in Hämeenlinna.
  - Lapinjärvi (Jyväskylä), a lake in Jyväskylä
  - Lapinjärvi (Jämsä), a lake in Jämsä
  - Lapinjärvi (Karstula), a lake in Karstula
  - Lapinjärvi (Keuruu), a lake in Keuruu
  - Lapinjärvi (Kinnula), a lake in Kinnula
  - Lapinjärvi (Laukaa), a lake in Laukaa and Toivakka
  - Lapinjärvi (Rautavaara), a lake in Rautavaara.
  - Lapinjärvi (Ruokolahti), a lake in Ruokolahti.
  - Lapinjärvi (Viitasaari), a lake in Viitasaari.
  - Lapinjärvi (Äänekoski), a lake in Äänekoski

== See also ==
- Lapinjärvi Educational Center, training civilian service (siviilipalvelus) personnel
