= Conscription in Finland =

Conscription in Finland is part of a general compulsion for national military service for all adult males (Finnish: Asevelvollisuus; Swedish: Värnplikt) defined in the section 127 of the Constitution of Finland.

Conscription can take the form of military or of civilian service. According to Finnish Defence Forces 2011 data, slightly under 65% of Finnish males turned 30 had entered and finished military service. The number of female volunteers to enter armed service had stabilized at approximately 300 annually. The service period is 165 days, 255 days, or 347 days for rank-and-file conscripts and 347 days for conscripts trained as non-commissioned officers or reserve officers. The length of civilian service is always twelve months. Those electing to serve unarmed in duties where unarmed service is possible serve either nine or twelve months, depending on their training.

Any Finnish citizen who refuses to perform both military and civilian service faces a penalty of 173 days in prison, minus any served days. Such sentences are usually served fully in prison, with no parole. Jehovah's Witnesses are no longer exempted from service as of February 27, 2019. Those who have been residents of demilitarized Åland from under the age of twelve are exempt from military service. By the Conscription Act of 1951, they are, however, required to serve a time at a local institution, like the coast guard. However, until such service has been arranged, they are freed from service obligation. The non-military service of Åland islands has not been arranged since the introduction of the act, and there are no plans to institute it. The inhabitants of Åland islands can also volunteer for military service on the mainland. Dual nationals of Finland and another country can also be exempted if they either complete at least 4 months of military service in another country, or have resided overseas for at least 7 years and do not move back to Finland before the age of 29.

Since 1995, women have been permitted to serve on a voluntary basis and pursue careers in the military after their initial voluntary military service.

The military service is served in Finnish Defence Forces or in the Finnish Border Guard. All services of the Finnish Defence Forces train conscripts. However, the Border Guard trains conscripts only in land-based units, not in coast guard detachments or in the Border Guard Air Wing. Civilian service may take place in the Civilian Service Center in Lapinjärvi or in an accepted non-profit organization of educational, social or medical nature.

== Military service ==
Drafting event in Tammisaari 1950s

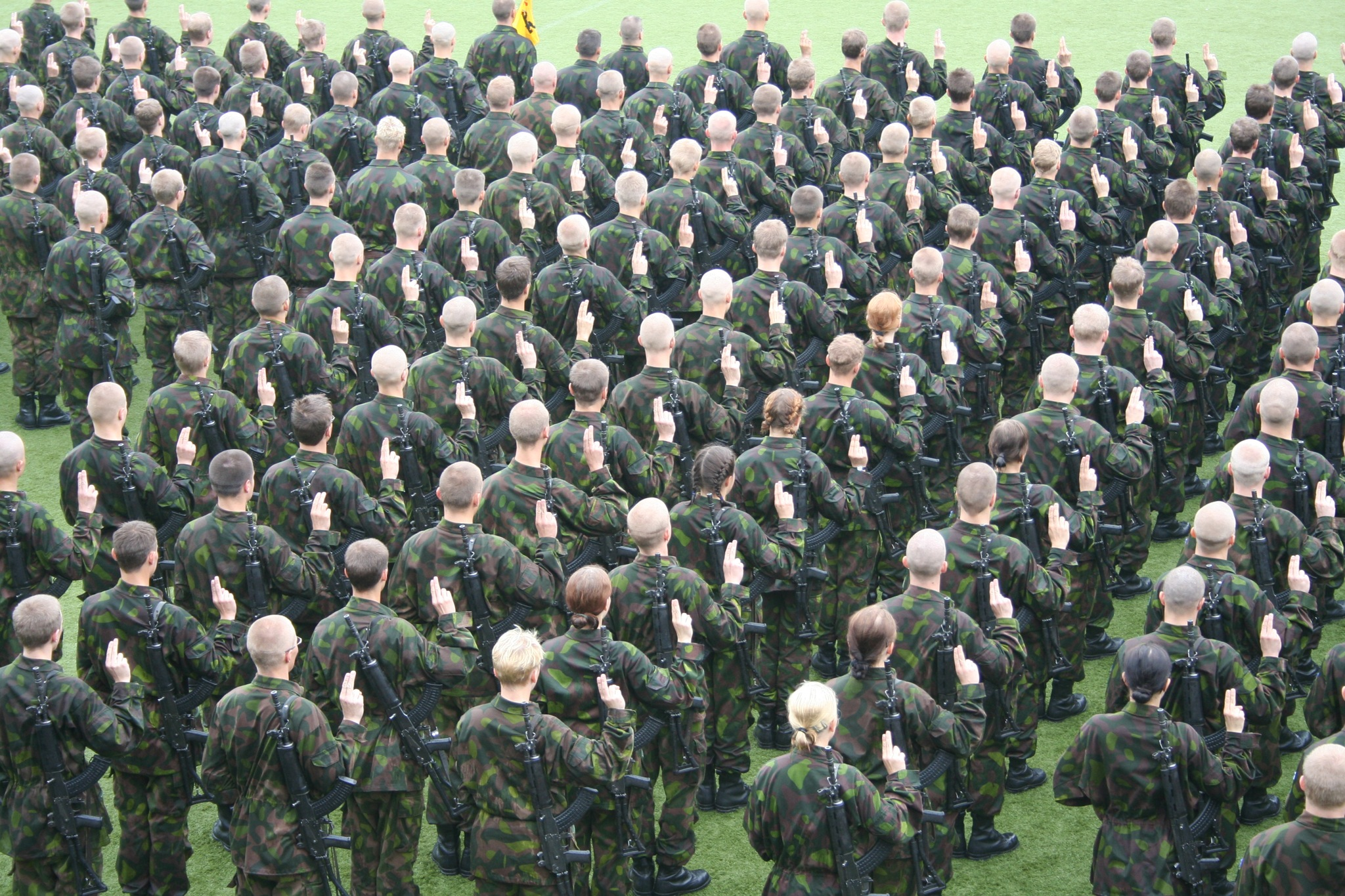
Finnish conscripts swearing their military oath at the end of their basic training period.

The Finnish Defence Forces are based on universal male conscription. All men above 18 years of age are liable to serve either 165, 255 or 347 days. Yearly, about 27,000 conscripts are trained. About 80% of Finnish male citizens complete the service. Thus, Finland has one of the highest rates of conscription, along with such countries as Singapore, Israel, Armenia, South Korea, Turkey, Estonia, and North Korea. The conscripts first receive basic training (6 weeks), after which they are assigned to various units for special training. Privates who are trained for tasks not requiring special skills serve for five and a half months. In technically demanding tasks, the time of service is eight and a half months or (in some cases, such as those selected for NCO or officer training) eleven and a half months.

All males are liable to report at the drafting event (Finnish: kutsunnat, Swedish: uppbåd) of their municipality in the autumn of the year they turn 18. The Finnish Defence Forces sends the youth an official invitation to the event along with an information package. Prior to the drafting event, the male is required to visit a municipal doctor for a physical examination. The drafting event is held simultaneously for all males of the age cohort of the municipality. In cities where this would be unfeasible, the age cohort is divided to different days based on the first letters of surname. The drafting event consists of a number of lectures, after which a doctor appointed by the municipality gives each male a physical examination. After the check-up, the youth meets the draft board in person. The draft board consists of two officers from the military regional office and one civilian appointed by the municipality. The youth can express his wishes for a service location, branch of service and the time of induction. After this, the board decides whether the youth is fit for service. If he is not, he is exempted completely or temporarily. Those fit for service are given an order of induction that determines their place of service and time of induction, or if necessary, a letter of delayed service. It is also possible for the youth to elect national service in front of the draft board. The decision of the draft board to give an induction order or to give a declaration of unfitness for service can be appealed against to the Central Draft Board which has five legally trained members and two members who have a minimum rank of lieutenant colonel. The decision of the Central Draft Board is final.

The draft board uses a system of six grades (only five of which are in active use) to determine the draftee's fitness for duty:

- A: Completely healthy, fit for all duty
- B (1, 2): Minor or major disability
- C: Exempt from duty during peacetime
- D: Exempt from duty during wartime and peacetime, not in use anymore
- E: Temporarily exempt from duty (short-term illness, injury, or impairment etc.)
- T: Exempt from duty during peacetime, decided by draft board instead of by medical diagnosis (for violent or hostile behaviour, criminal past etc.)

Those who fail to report to the drafting event are fetched to the event by the police. If they are not found, they are given an order to report to the military regional office and, if necessary, brought there for an examination and drafting by the police. In addition, they will be prosecuted and sentenced to a fine. Those residing abroad can report to the nearest Finnish embassy for medical examination and drafting.

The conscripts are inducted twice a year, in January and in July. The order of induction received from the draft board is binding: The conscript becomes a military person on the hour stated in the order even if he is absent from service. Not reporting to the service is prosecuted as an absence without leave or as desertion.

The basic training takes place during the first six weeks. At the end of the basic training, the actual training specialty and consequently the service time are decided by the brigade commander on the recommendation of the company commander. Those ordered for leadership training attend next the NCO course. After the seven-week phase I of the course, a portion of the students are sent to Reserve Officer School or an equivalent institution for officer training, while the remaining NCO students complete the 12-week phase II of the NCO course. At the same time, the rank and file receive the specialized training of their branch, often at the same company as they underwent their basic training. After completion of their NCO or reserve officer training, the new conscript leaders are sent to normal units to serve as the leaders for the next incoming conscript cohort. The NCOs serve as corporals (in the Navy, petty officers 3rd class), with the possibility of promotion to sergeant (petty officer 2nd class). Those who have graduated Reserve Officer School or equivalent serve as officer candidates, ranking junior to career personnel but outranking conscript sergeants. At the end of their service, officer candidates are promoted to second lieutenants (in the navy, sublieutenants). Privates have a possibility of being promoted to lance corporal (in the navy, seaman) for extraordinarily good service. The service times are determined so that the conscript leaders are demobilized with the rank and file of that cohort. After discharge, the conscripts retain their ranks as inactive reserve ranks.

After their military service, the former conscripts are placed in reserve until the age of 50 or 60, depending on their military rank. During their time in reserve, the reservists are liable for activation for five types of duty:

- mandatory military refresher exercises (Finnish: kertausharjoitus) for a maximum of 40, 75 or 100 days, depending on the reservist's military rank;
- extraordinary activation during a large-scale disaster or a virulent epidemic;
- extraordinary activation (Finnish: ylimääräinen palvelus) if the military threat against Finland has seriously increased;
- partial mobilization (Finnish: osittainen liikekannallepano);
- full mobilization (Finnish: yleinen liikekannallepano).

The males who do not belong to the reserve may only be activated in case of a full mobilization, and those rank-and-file personnel who have fulfilled 50 years of age only with a specific parliamentary decision. In addition to the mandatory refresher exercises, the reservist may be activated for voluntary exercises, but participation in these is, as name suggests, voluntary. However, when the reservist answers affirmatively to a voluntary activation request, he becomes an active member of the military for the duration of the exercise, with the same rights and obligations as a mandatorily activated reservist, though with only an allowance corresponding to the conscript's lowest allowance. The reservists who have been activated mandatorily for any reason receive a taxable pay of 58.85–64.50 euros per diem, based on their rank, and a tax-free allowance corresponding to the lowest conscript's allowance. Similarly to the induction, an activated reservist becomes a military person at the moment when he was ordered to report to service. Disobeying an activation order is prosecuted as an absence without leave or as desertion, depending on the length of absence.

Military service can be started after turning 18, but can be delayed due to studies, work or other personal reasons until the age of 29. In addition to lodging, food, clothes and health care, the conscripts receive a tax-free allowance of between €5.10 and €11.90 per day, depending on the time they have served. In addition to the basic allowance, conscripts serving as parachutists, divers or pilots receive danger bonuses of 10-20 euros per jump or day of diving or, for pilots, 182 euros per month.

The state pays the conscript's rent and electricity bills. If the conscripts have families, they are entitled to benefits as well. Reservists are eligible for similar support only if the total income of reservist's family from all sources is below a certain, rather low, limit. It is illegal to fire an employee due to absence due military service or due to a refresher exercise or activation. Voluntary females in military service receive the same benefits as males and a small additional benefit, because they are expected to provide their own underwear and other personal items.

Military service consists of lessons, practical training, various cleaning and maintenance duties, and field exercises. The wake-up call is usually at 05:30, and a day's typical duty lasts for 12 hours, including meals and some breaks. In the evening there are a few hours of free time. Roll call is at 21:00, and at 22:00 silence is announced, after which no noise is to be made. On a majority of weekends, conscripts can leave the barracks on Friday and are expected to return by midnight on Sunday evening. A small force of conscripts is kept in readiness on weekends to aid civil agencies in various types of emergency situations, to guard the premises, and to maintain defense in case of a sudden military emergency. Field exercises can go on regardless of the time of day or day of week. An average conscript spends 40–60 nights outdoors during field exercises, depending on his unit.

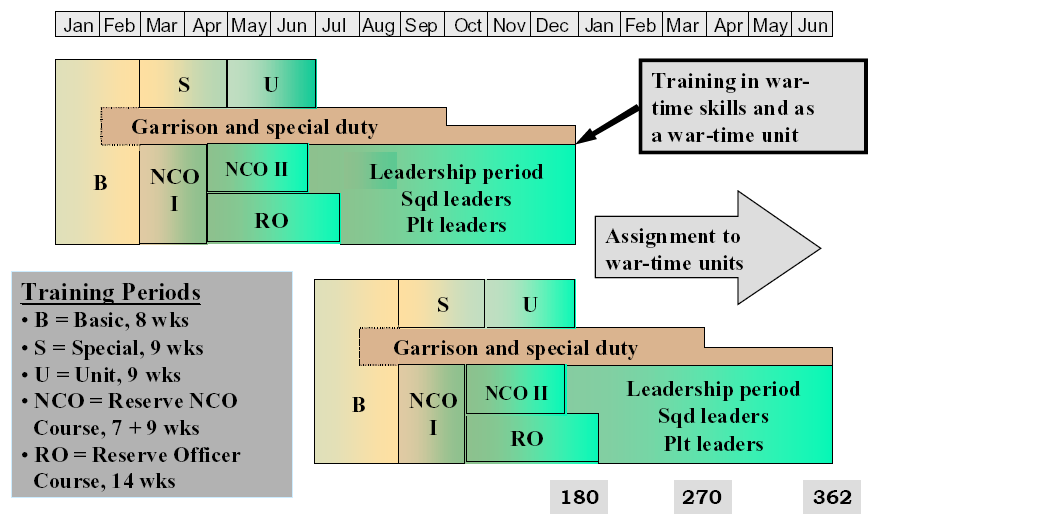
Figure illustrating the organization of Finnish conscript training

The training of conscripts is based on the joukkotuotanto principle (lit. English troop production). In this system, 80% of the conscripts train to fulfill a specific role in a specific wartime military unit. Each brigade-level unit has a responsibility of producing specified reserve units from the conscripts it has been allocated. As the reservists are discharged, they receive a specific wartime placement in the unit with which they have trained during their conscription. As the conscripts age, their unit is given new, different tasks and material. Typically, reservists are placed for the first five years in first-line units, then moved to military formations with less demanding tasks, while the reservists unable to serve in the unit are substituted with reservists from the reserve without specific placement. In refresher exercises, the unit is then given new training for these duties if the defense budget permits.

== Non-military service ==
Non-military service has a fixed length of 347 days and consists of basic training and the actual service. The basic training takes place in the Lapinjärvi Civilian Service Center and lasts 28 days. During basic training, the serviceman is given instruction in first aid, peace education, internationalism, and non-violent resistance. In addition, some trainees receive an anti-oil leak or non-violent activity training. During the basic training, the civilian servicemen have training during weekdays from 08:00 until 16:00. On Fridays, the service usually ends before noon, while weekends are off. The servicemen are allowed to leave the service center freely during their free time, and may, if they wish, live at their homes during the basic training.

For the actual service period, the serviceman is required to obtain a service place, which must have an agreement with the civilian service center. During the actual service period, the place of service is responsible for the health care and maintenance of the serviceman. The serviceman is obligated to work for 40 hours a week at times prescribed by the place of service. He has the right to enjoy a continuous daily rest period of 8 hours, however. The work is carried out according to the usual civilian OSHA regulations. During his free time, the serviceman is allowed to leave the premises of the service place freely. During the service and basic training, the serviceman receives the same daily allowance as the conscript. During the service, the serviceman is entitled to receive 18 days of leave, in addition to his free time. In addition to this leave, he may receive a maximum of 20 days of leave for good performance.

If the serviceman does not comply with his duties and obligations or is absent, the service place is obligated to inform the civilian service center, which carries out an investigation. For minor infractions, the serviceman may be punished administratively. The punishment consists of a written warning, extra work (maximum 4 hours/day for five days), or the loss of daily allowance for a maximum of 30 days. If the infractions are continuous, the civilian service center reports the serviceman to the police and discharges him. After this, the serviceman is usually convicted of civilian service crime to prison for a time that corresponds half of his remaining term of service. No parole is available. The same punishment applies to those who make a written denunciation of their service obligation. After serving the prison term, the former inmate is freed of his remaining peacetime service obligations.

After their service, the civilian servicemen belong to the civil reserve (siviilivaranto) until the end of their 50th life year. After this, they belong to the civil militia (lisävaranto) until the end of their 60th life year. During this time, they may be activated for extra training, if the international tension rises to the level where military reserves are activated. During a mobilization, the civilian servicemen may be mobilized and assigned duties in civil defense, rescue authorities or environmental authorities. In case of general mobilization, the parliament may give permission to activate even the civil militia. The "total objectors", who have served a prison term for refusing civilian service, receive no exceptions. The activated or mobilized servicemen receive the same pay as rank-and-file reservists.

In case of a crisis where reserve is partially activated, the automatic acceptance into civilian service is suspended. Instead, those applying to the civilian service on grounds of conscience must demonstrate their personal, non-violent conviction to an investigation board. The board would consist of three professional judges, a psychologist selected by the civilian service center, an officer selected by the Finnish Defence Forces, and a priest or a religious scholar. Only those who could prove their conviction would be given the right to civilian service. Persons failing the examination would be liable for military service. However, those who have already served their civilian or supplemental service are ensured of their right to non-military duties at all times. In addition, any conscript or activated reservist always has the right to be transferred to non-armed military service, regardless of eventual crisis.

If, after his military service, a person experiences a crisis of conscience that prevents him from fulfilling his reserve obligations, he may ask the military regional office for acceptance into civilian service. In such a case, the person is ordered to start a supplemental service, the length of which is not more than 40 days but usually less. After starting the supplemental service, the person is transferred to civilian reserve and cannot be ordered to serve in military duties at any time.

== Other forms of conscription ==
Finnish conscription is based on the general duty of national defense, which applies to all citizens, regardless of their age or sex. The other forms of the fulfillment of this duty are:

- Duty to partake in civil defense training;
- General work duty;
- Duty to partake in rescue operations.

The duty to partake in civil defense training is applicable to those persons who have been designated as civil defense personnel by a competent authority. Such persons may be called up to civil defense training for a maximum of ten days per year. During the training, they enjoy the same benefits and pay as activated reservists.

The duty to partake in rescue operations is applicable to anyone near a fire or an accident. Everyone is required to report the accident or fire and to immediately start such rescue and fire-fighting they are capable of. After the arrival of the rescue crew, the chief of the rescue operation may order anyone who is nearby to help in rescue operation in such manner as they are capable, if preventing an accident or saving a human life requires the order. If the emergency cannot be otherwise controlled, a career rescue authority official may order any person inside the municipality to immediately arrive at the place of operation to assist in the operation.

The general work duty is applicable only during a severe crisis which involves a war, a foreign aggression, a heightened international tension causing a danger of war, a severe disruption of international economy, or a large-scale disaster. In the case of such emergency, the Government may, using the powers given by the Emergency Powers Act, introduce a general work duty, pertaining to all Finnish citizens between 16 and 65 years of age. In the case of non-military emergency, a person may only be ordered to perform work pertaining to health care, civil defense or rescue operations. In case of a military emergency, the work may consist of any duties that are necessary to "secure the livelihood of the population and the national economy, to maintain legal order and constitutional and human rights, and to safeguard the territorial integrity and independence of Finland in emergency conditions." However, the work must be such that the person obligated to work can carry it out within their skills and strengths. The order to work suspends, but does not terminate, their present employment. The work carried out by the obligated person is regulated under the usual conditions of the field of employment, and the standard union wages are paid for it.

During a war or an armed crisis, the military has the power to order persons present in an area which is exposed to enemy attack to perform such work as is necessary for the maintenance of troops or for defense preparations. A person given such an order may not be obligated to work for longer than 12 or, in special circumstances, 24 days. Anyone between 15 and 65 years of age may be drafted for such work, regardless of nationality, occupation, or obligation to perform general work duty. The right to draft civilians for necessary work is delegated to commanders of battalion-sized units.

== Criticism ==
A citizen's initiative on abolition of conscription in Finland started collecting names on 2 September 2013. The initiative proposed that men who refuse service should no longer be sentenced to prison. According to the initiative, conscription is an expensive, sexist, and out-dated solution for combating any realistic threat scenarios of today. However, the initiative gained little public support and failed to reach the hurdle of 50,000 signatories needed for bringing the initiative to parliamentary process. The military is a strong part of Finnish society and culture. Before the 1990s, national service was regarded as a rite of passage for young men. This was especially true for the rural Finnish population. Before the 1990s, private companies were often hesitant to hire 20-year-olds if they had neither military service nor education to show for what they were doing during the previous two years.

According to Yle, the Finnish Army has joined the debate on mandatory military service. Numerous pro-conscription letters and columns by officers and regional army heads were published in the summer of 2013 praising the benefits of military service.

The Defence Forces has been accused of providing misleading information on the economic effects of conscription. The commanders of the Defence Forces have repeatedly claimed that conscription is a cost-effective method to defend the country. Professor of Economics Roope Uusitalo says that the claim is not supported by economic research. Professor of Economics Panu Poutvaara has stated that an all-volunteer army would produce a stronger army using fewer resources.

== See also ==
- Conscription in Åland
