= Haminan Palloilijat =

Finnish pesäpallo club

- Logo

Information
- League: Superpesis
- Location: Hamina, Finland
- Ballpark: Rampart Field
- Founded: 1928
- Colors: orange, black
- Ownership: Haminan Palloilijat ry
- Manager: Eerik Häkämies
- Website: haminanpalloilijat.net

Haminan Palloilijat (lit. "Hamina Ballplayers") is a Finnish sports club from Hamina. It was founded in 1928. Haminan Palloilijat has participated in many sports in Finland over the years. The club's main successes have been in pesäpallo. Haminan Palloilijat is playing in the top-tier Superpesis.

Haminan Palloilijat has won the men's Finnish Pesäpallo Championship (Superpesis) seven times in years 1939, 1943, 1947, 1948, 1954, 1955 and 1974. The home ground of Haminan Palloilijat is the Rampart Field.

== History ==
Haminan Palloilijat was founded in 1928 and its greatness largely dated back to the dawn of pesäpallo. The club's first of seven championships came in 1939 and the next five between 1943 and 1955. In addition to the six championships, the club won five silver and two bronze medals in the years leading up to its greatness in 1955. Together with Helsingin Pallonlyöjät, Helsingin Pallo-Toverit and Lahden Maila-Veikot, Haminan Palloilijat was one of the main clubs in pesäpallo.

After the 1950s, however, success began to wane, but in the 1970s the club rose to success again. In 1970, Hamina celebrated a bronze medal and in 1974 the club won its seventh Finnish championship. Since the 1970s, the club has not won any more medals.

Hamina is 14th in the men's marathon table. During the club's successful years, the series was played as a single series with only 11-13 teams. This meant that HP played only 10-12 matches in the summer. Hamina has 48 main series seasons. Only Jyväskylän Kiri, Vimpelin Veto and Kouvolan Pallonlyöjät have more main series seasons.

== Stadiums ==
Since 1956, Haminan Palloilijat has played its home games at the legendary Rampart Field. Before that, the club played its home matches at Hamina Square until the war years 1939–1945 and then at Hamina Sports Ground. There was also a field in front of the main building of the Reserve Officer School, but it was mainly used for women's and junior matches.

== Supporters and rivalries ==
The club's strong position is illustrated by the fact that it was a strong spectator team from the very beginning. In the 1940s and 1950s, matches often attracted between 2,000 and 3,000 spectators. The club's record attendance of 5,215 was set in June 1968 in a series match against Vimpelin Veto.

The status of pesäpallo in Hamina is illustrated by the fact that the City of Hamina has a named street to the Rampart Field after the club's greatest legend, Kari Lindberg.

The club's local rivalry is Kouvolan Pallonlyöjät.

== Achievements ==
Men's Pesäpallo

Superpesis

Type	Trophy	Titles	Seasons
Finnish championship	Winners	7	1939, 1943, 1947, 1948, 1954, 1955, 1974
Finnish championship	Second place	5	1928, 1929, 1930, 1946, 1950
Finnish championship	Third place	4	1932, 1945, 1953, 1970

Women's Pesäpallo

Superpesis

Type	Trophy	Titles	Seasons
Finnish championship
Finnish championship	Second place	2	1932, 1939
Finnish championship	Third place	2	1934, 1951
