= Rampart Field =

Pesäpallo stadium in Hamina, Finland

- Vallikenttä
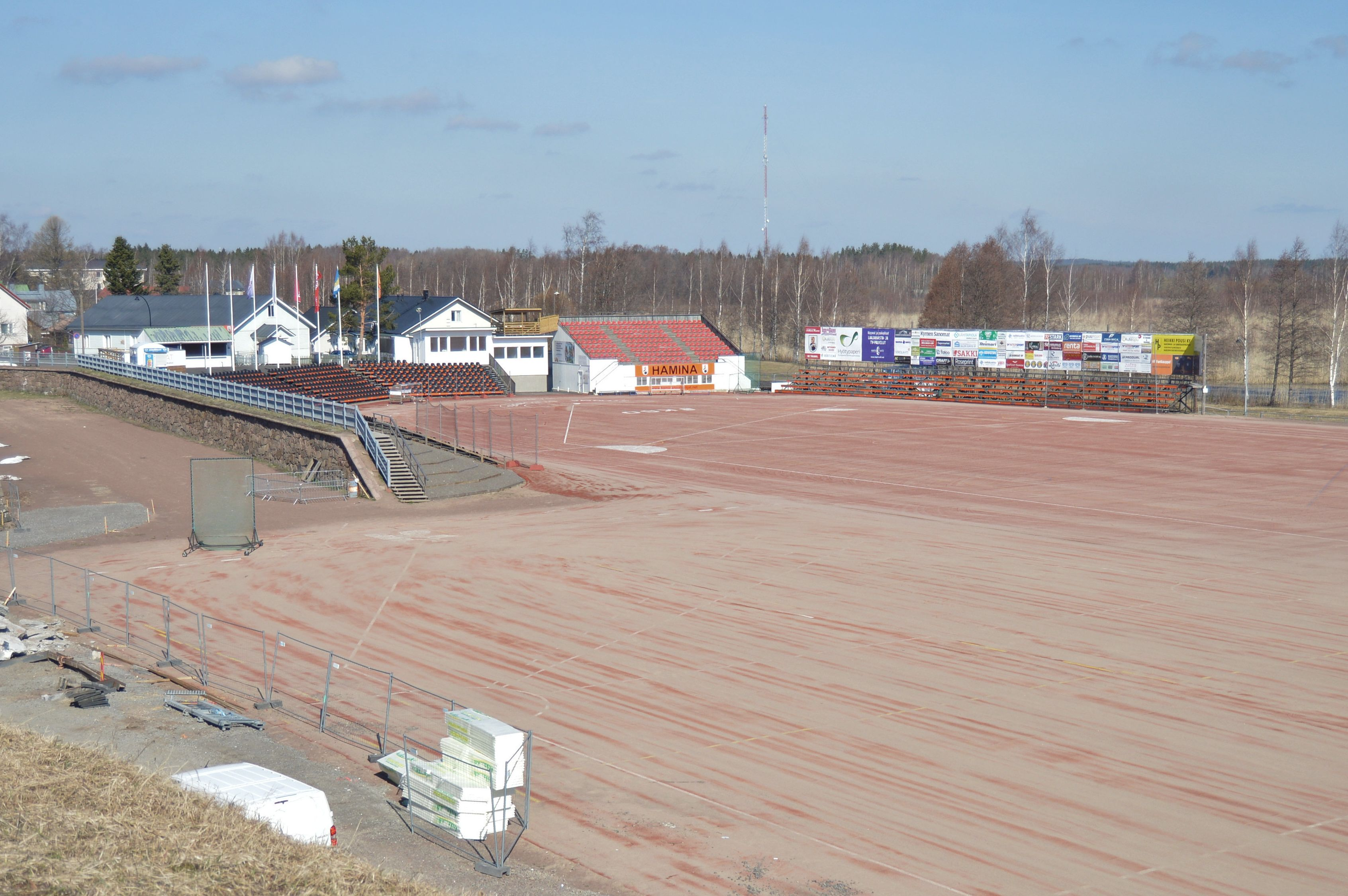
- Rampart Field in 2019.

- Location within Kymenlaakso Location within Finland Location within Europe
- Address: Kari Lindbergin katu 1 Hamina
- Location: Hamina, Finland
- Coordinates: 60.571843°N 27.202436°E
- Owner: City of Hamina
- Seating type: Stadium seating and benches
- Capacity: 3,000
- Surface: Clay
- Screen: No
- Record attendance: 5,215; June 3, 1968 (Haminan Palloilijat vs. Vimpelin Veto)
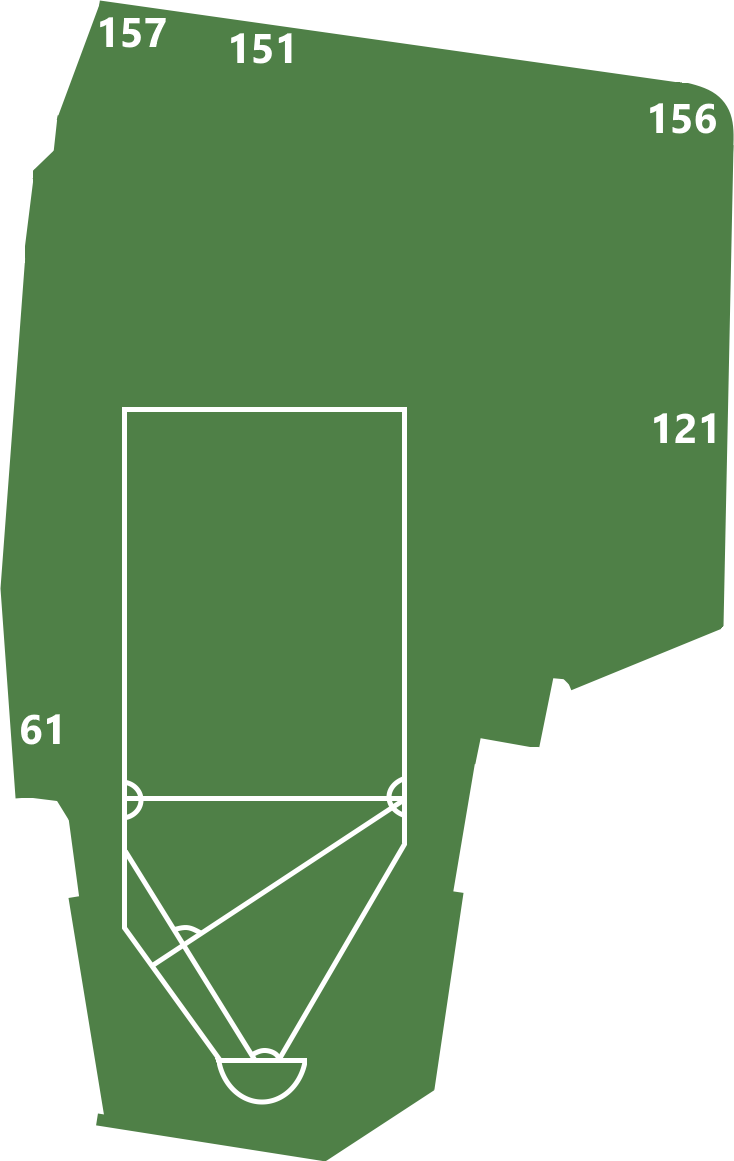
- Field size: Left field: 157 m (515 ft); Centre field: 151 m (495 ft); Right field: 156 m (512 ft)
- Field shape: P-shaped
- Public transit: Hamina linja-autoasema, various interregional routes
- Parking: 50 marked parking spots

Construction
- Opened: 1956

Tenant
- Haminan Palloilijat (1956–present)

The Rampart Field (Finnish: Vallikenttä) is a pesäpallo stadium located in Hamina, Finland. Since its opening in 1956, it has been the home field of the Haminan Palloilijat, a Superpesis team.

The Rampart Field is located in the heart of Hamina Fortress, right next to the ramparts of the central bastion. Despite this, the pitch is set up in such a way that there is plenty of room for through balls.

City of Hamina has a named street to the Rampart Field after the club's greatest legend, Kari Lindberg.

The stadium has no covered seats as of November 2024, the only such team in the men's 2025 Superpesis season. Renovation costs planned for 2026–27 in order to meet new league requirements for covered seats were estimated at €2.6 million, of which €800,000 were earmarked from the city budgets, with the club struggling to find financing for the rest of the cost.

== Gallery ==
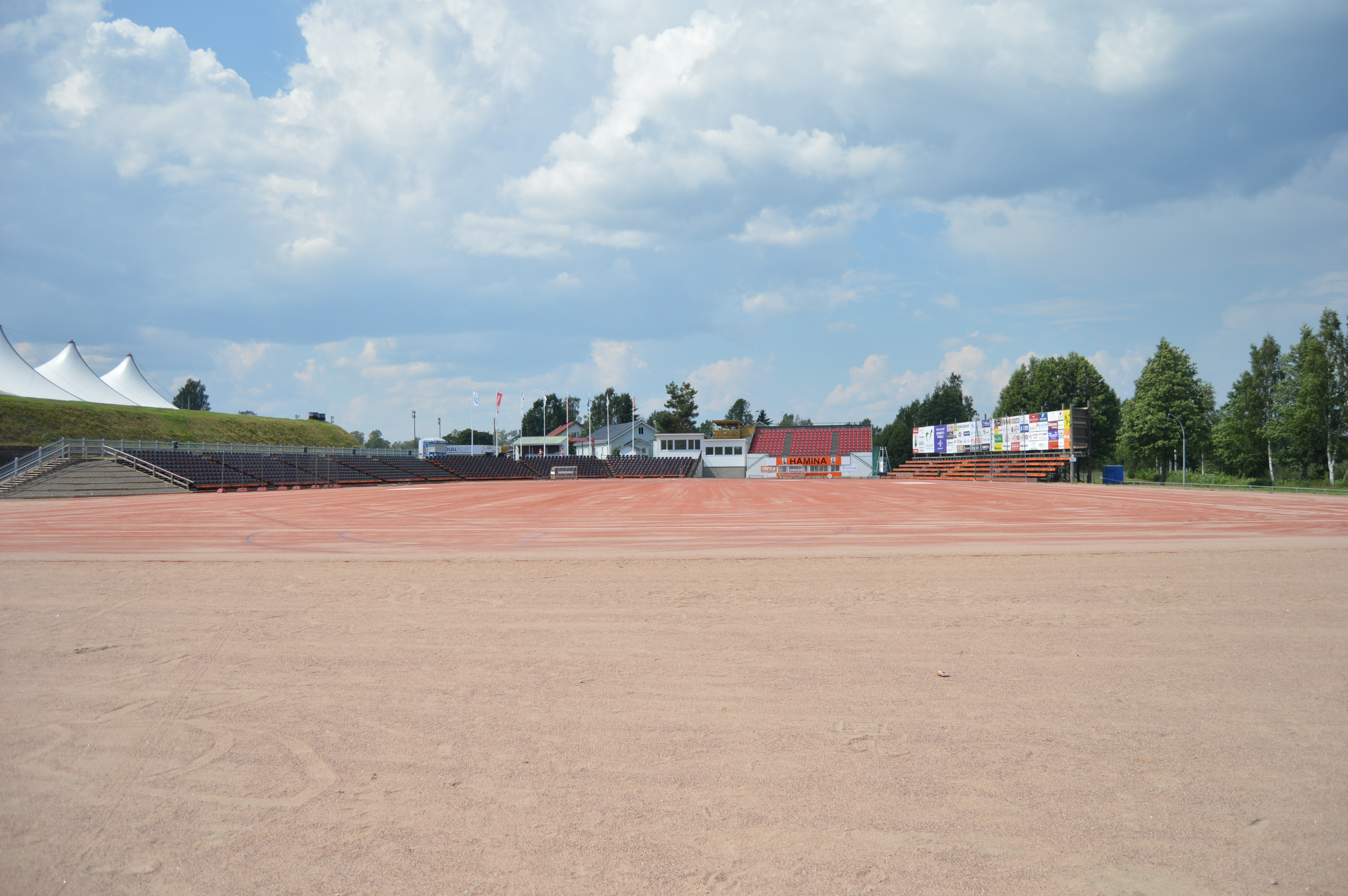
View from centre field facing towards home base.
