= Hamina =

Town in Kymenlaakso, Finland

Hamina Fredrikshamn
- Town
- Haminan kaupunki Fredrikshamns stad
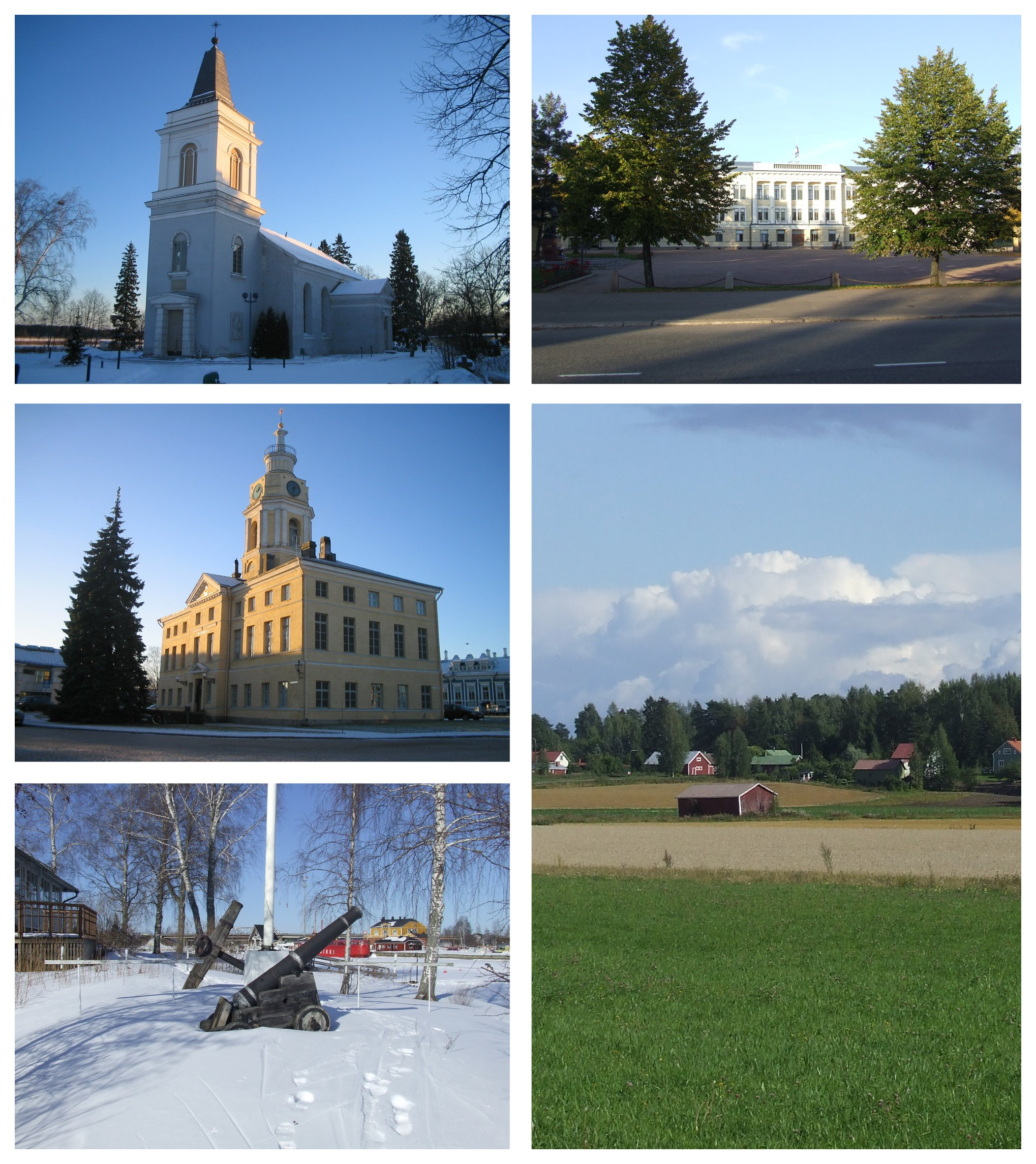
- Clockwise from top-left: St. Mary's Church, the Reserve Officer School, the countryside of Husula neighbourhood, a view from the Sailor Pavilion towards Tervasaari and the historical Town Hall.

- Flag Coat of arms

- Location of Hamina in Finland
- Interactive map of Hamina
- Coordinates: 60°34′N 027°12′E
- Country: Finland
- Region: Kymenlaakso
- Sub-region: Kotka-Hamina
- Charter: 1653
- Named for: Frederick I of Sweden

Government
  - Town manager: Ilari Soosalu

Area (2018-01-01)
  - Total: 1,155.14 km^{2} (446.00 sq mi)
  - Land: 609.89 km^{2} (235.48 sq mi)
  - Water: 545.66 km^{2} (210.68 sq mi)
  - Rank: 138th largest in Finland

Population (2025-12-31)
  - Total: 19,113
  - Rank: 61st largest in Finland
  - Density: 31.34/km^{2} (81.2/sq mi)

Population by native language
  - Finnish: 90.7% (official)
  - Swedish: 0.3%
  - Others: 9%

Population by age
  - 0 to 14: 12.8%
  - 15 to 64: 57.2%
  - 65 or older: 30%
- Time zone: UTC+02:00 (EET)
  - Summer (DST): UTC+03:00 (EEST)
- Climate: Dfb
- Website: www.hamina.fi/en/

Hamina (Finnish pronunciation: [ˈhɑminɑ]; Swedish: Fredrikshamn, Finland Swedish: [freːdriksˈhɑmn], Sweden Swedish: [freːdrɪksˈhamːn]) is a town and a municipality of Southern Finland on the coast of the gulf of Finland, first mentioned in 1336. Hamina has one of the most important harbors of Finland, the Port of Hamina-Kotka. The port specializes in forest products and the transit of cargo to Russia. As of 2026, six Google data centers buildings are situated in Hamina.

== Geography ==
Hamina is located in the Kymenlaakso region (formerly the province of Southern Finland), approximately 145 km (90 mi) east of the country's capital Helsinki about 25 km (16 mi) of Kotka, the regional capital of Kymenlaakso and about 40 km (25 mi) West of the border to Russia.

The municipality's population is 19,113 (as of 31 December 2025) and covers an area of 1,155.14 square kilometres (446.00 sq mi), of which 545.66 km^{2} (210.68 sq mi) is water. The population density is 31.34 inhabitants per square kilometre (81.2/sq mi). The population of the central town is approximately 10,000. The municipal language of Hamina is Finnish.

Highway 7 (E18) is the town's road connection to Helsinki, after it was upgraded to a continuous motorway in September 2014. Hamina is also the base of one of the most important harbors of Finland, the Port of Hamina-Kotka. The port specializes in forest products and the transit of cargo to Russia.

== History ==
Vehkalahti was as a municipality first mentioned in 1336. At the proposal of Count Per Brahe, the area surrounding the Vehkalahti church (today St. Mary's Church) received its charter in 1653 through the establishment of Vehkalahden Uusikaupunki (Veckelax Nystad in Swedish, "The New Town of Vehkalahti"). The town was later destroyed during the Great Northern War in 1712.

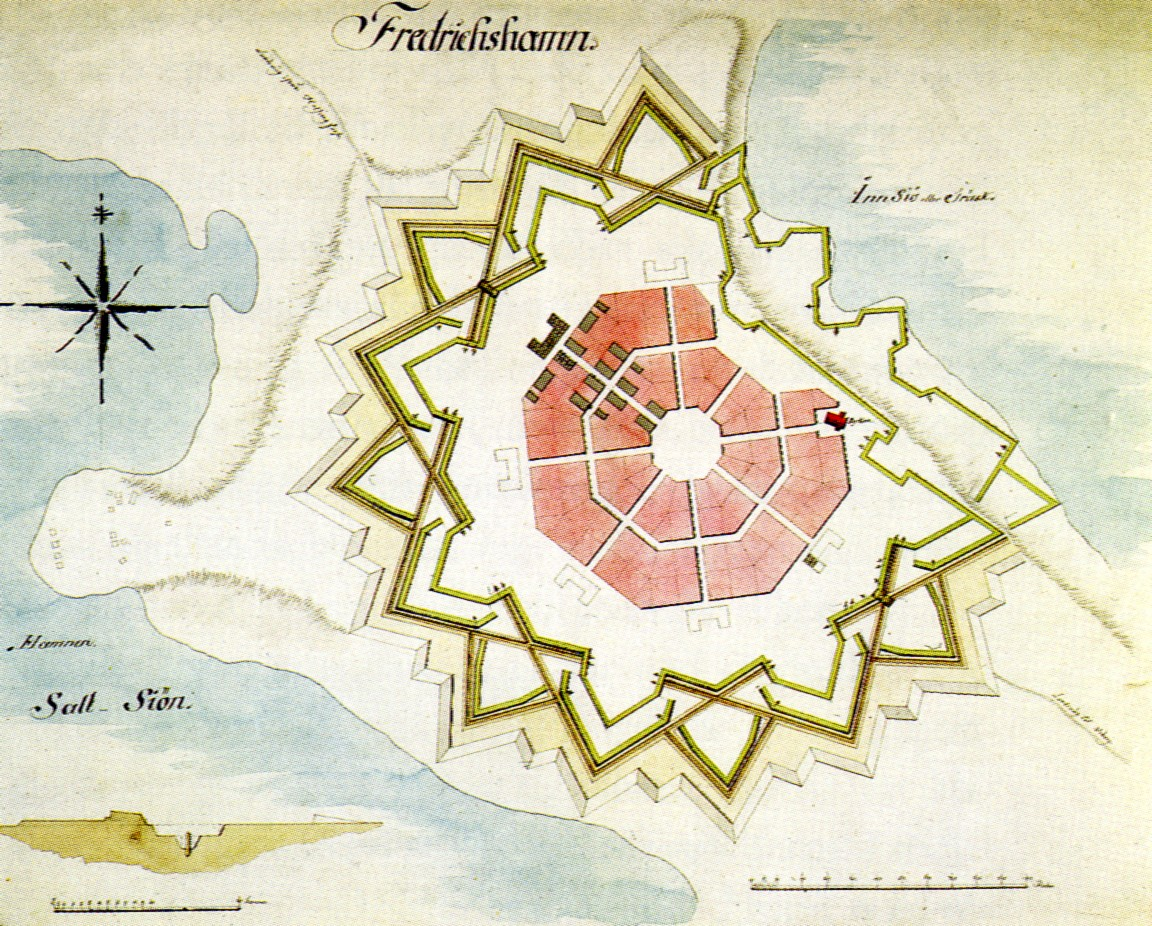
Plan of the Fredrikshamn fortress town (1723) by Axel Löwen

As the commercially vibrant city of Vyborg was lost to Russia in 1721, Fredrikshamn (named in 1723 in the honor of King Frederick I of Sweden) was dedicated to replace it. The town, hitherto a small domestic port with restricted trading privileges, was granted extensive rights to conduct foreign trade. The Finnish speaking population soon abbreviated the name of the town to Hamina. The reconstruction of the town was completed between 1722 and 1724. The star-shaped fortress and the circular town plan, designed by Axel Löwen, were based on Central European and Italian Renaissance concepts from the 16th century. Fortress towns with a circular street plan like this are quite rare; one example is Palmanova in Italy.

In 1743, Hamina was surrendered to Russia, after the Russo–Swedish War, 1741–1743, and the town of Loviisa was the next Swedish candidate for an Eastern-Finnish trade center. Hamina became a Russian frontier town, for which a fortress was desirable.

The Treaty of Fredrikshamn (1809), by which Sweden ceded Finland, including parts of the province of Lappland and Åland, was signed in Hamina. Thus Sweden was split, and the eastern half was formed into the Grand Duchy of Finland, an autonomous part of the Russian Empire. In 1812, the previously conquered territories known as Old Finland (including Hamina) were joined to the Grand Duchy.

Hamina Cadet School was founded in 1819 and was in operation until 1903. One of the most famous students of this school was young Carl Gustaf Emil Mannerheim (1867–1951), later known as the Marshal of Finland. In 1920 the Reserve Officer School began in the same facilities.

Because the town was founded next to the Vehkalahti Church, the municipal center had always been inside the town borders. Vehkalahti and Hamina were consolidated in 2003, and the old coat of arms was replaced with Vehkalahti's coat of arms. The old coat of arms was readopted in January 2013.

Results of the 2021 Finnish municipal elections, resulted in The Finns Party being the largest group on Hamina council, in Hamina.

== Economy ==
One of Google's European data centers is situated in Hamina since 2009.As of 2020 Hamina was the seat of Google´s sixth google data center in Finland. Google bought the former Stora Enso pulp factory Summa Mill in 2009, and announced construction in 2019 to meet its cloud service demands, though COVID-19 pandemic slowed construction. Seawater is used for cooling. Offsite heat is recovered and routed free of charge to the district heating network.

== Main sights ==
- Town Hall: Originally built in 1798, it was renovated by Carl Ludvig Engel in 1840.
- Reserve Officer School: The site which trains reserve officers in the Army Academy of the Finnish Army
- Town Museum: It is located in a building where King Gustav III of Sweden and Empress Catherine II of Russia met in 1783.
- Shopkeeper's Museum
- Hamina Fortress: Built in the 18th century, it is one of the star forts in Finland. The corners of the fortress form six bastions, named after towns in Finland. The Central Bastion was added at the end of the 18th century, and is currently used for cultural events.

=== Churches ===
- St. Mary's Church, previously known as Vehkalahti Church, is the oldest building in Kymenlaakso. It was originally built in the Middle Ages, but it was burnt in 1821 and the current neoclassical exterior is designed by Carl Ludvig Engel and completed in 1828. The church has a museum dedicated to the church life from the 18th century onwards.
- St. John's Church, formerly known as Hamina Church, was built between 1841-1843. It was designed by Carl Ludvig Engel in the neoclassical style.
- Church of St. Peter and St. Paul, the Orthodox church in Hamina, was built in 1837. It was designed by Italian-French architect Louis Visconti. The architecture of the church is combination of neoclassical and Byzantine elements.
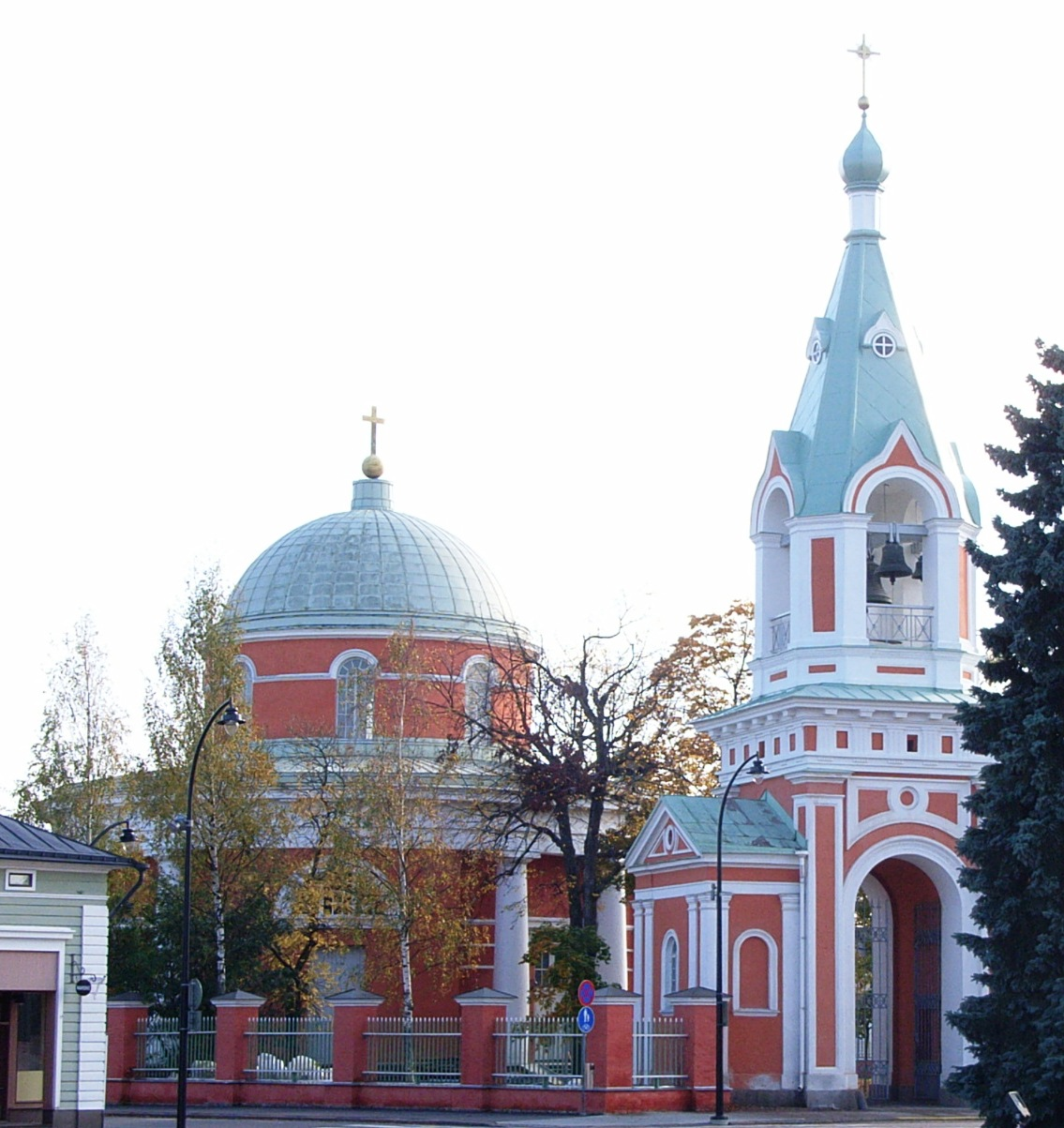
The orthodox church of Peter and Paul

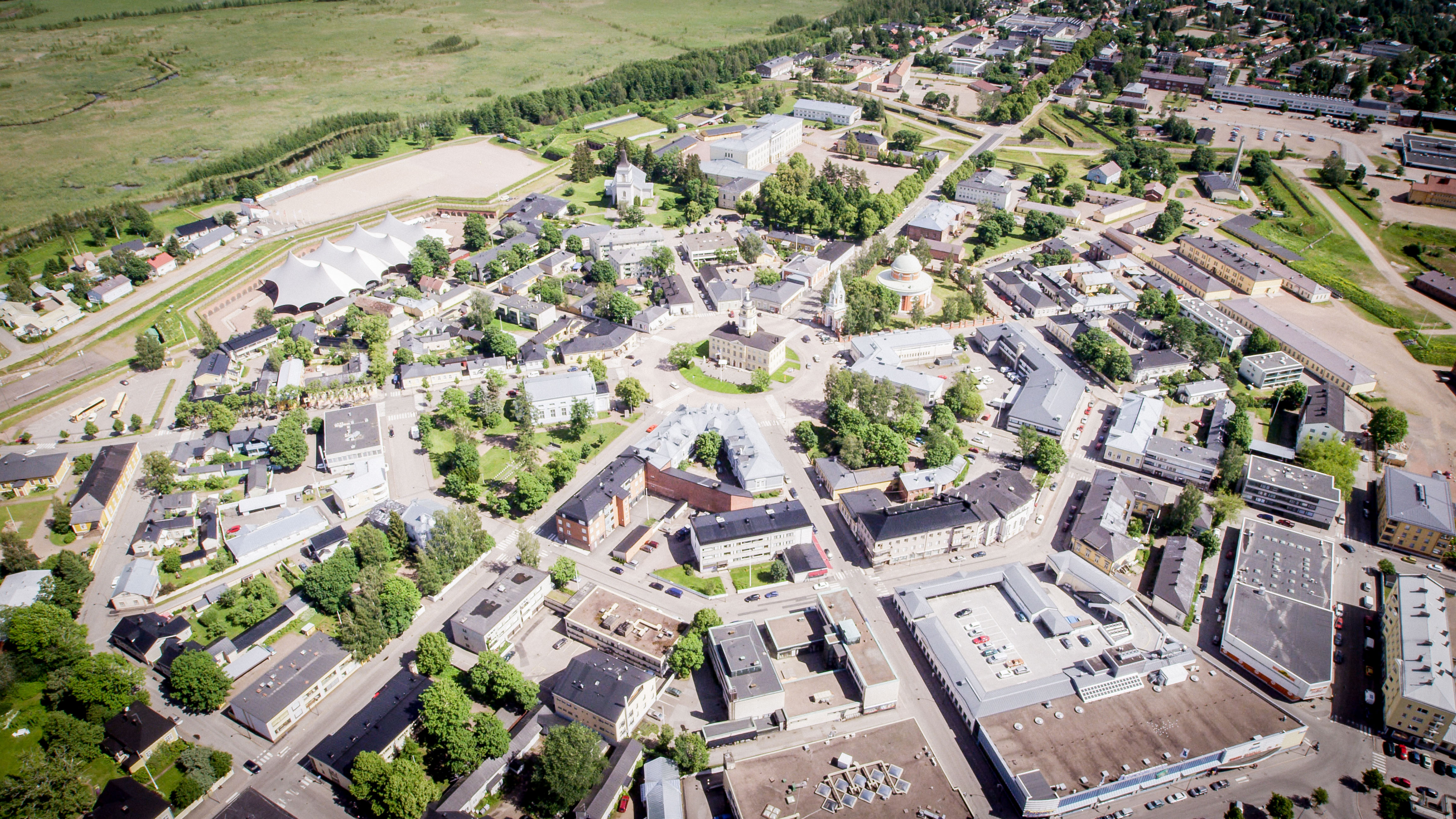
Aerial view of the town

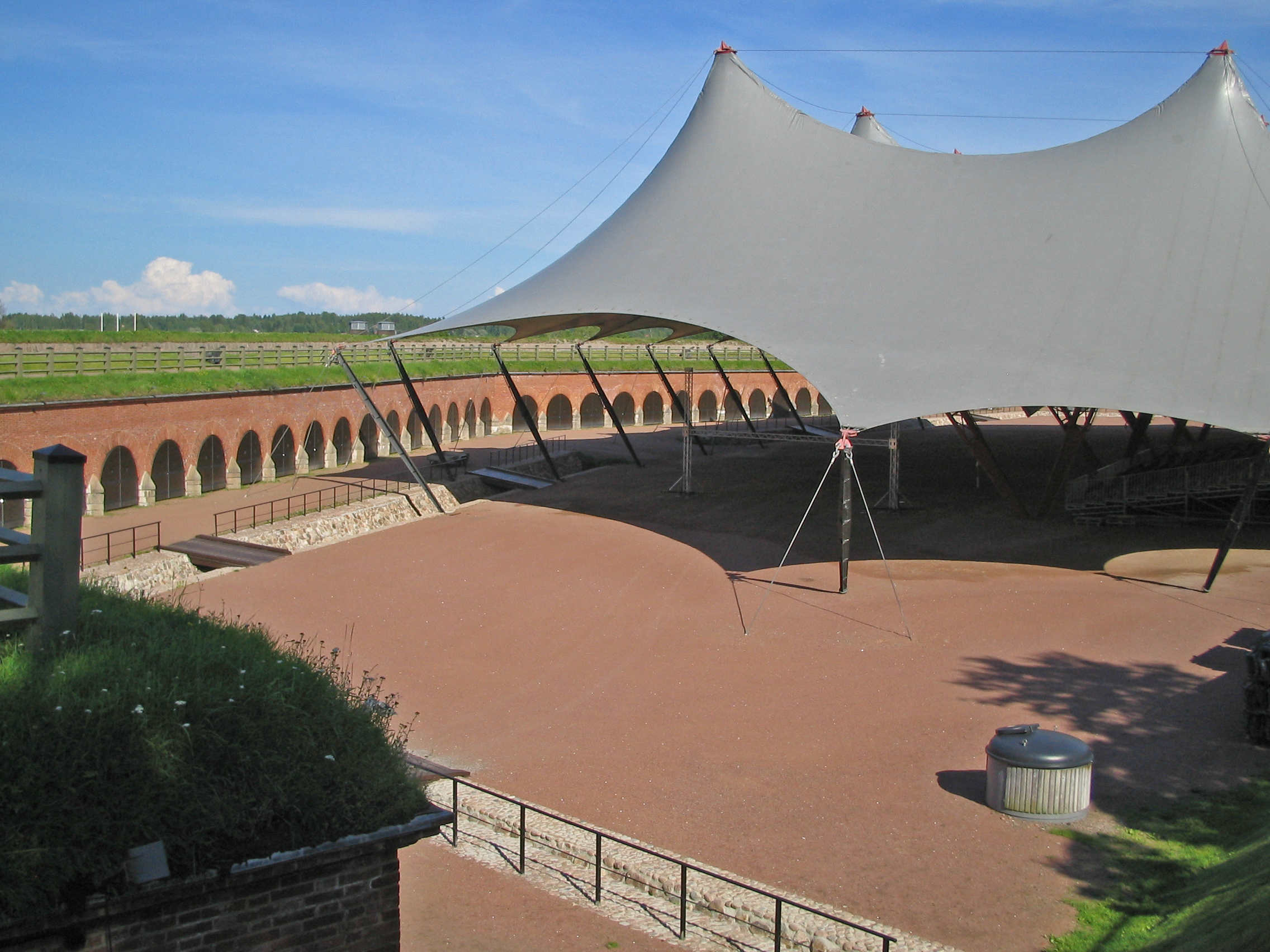
Central bastion of the fortress

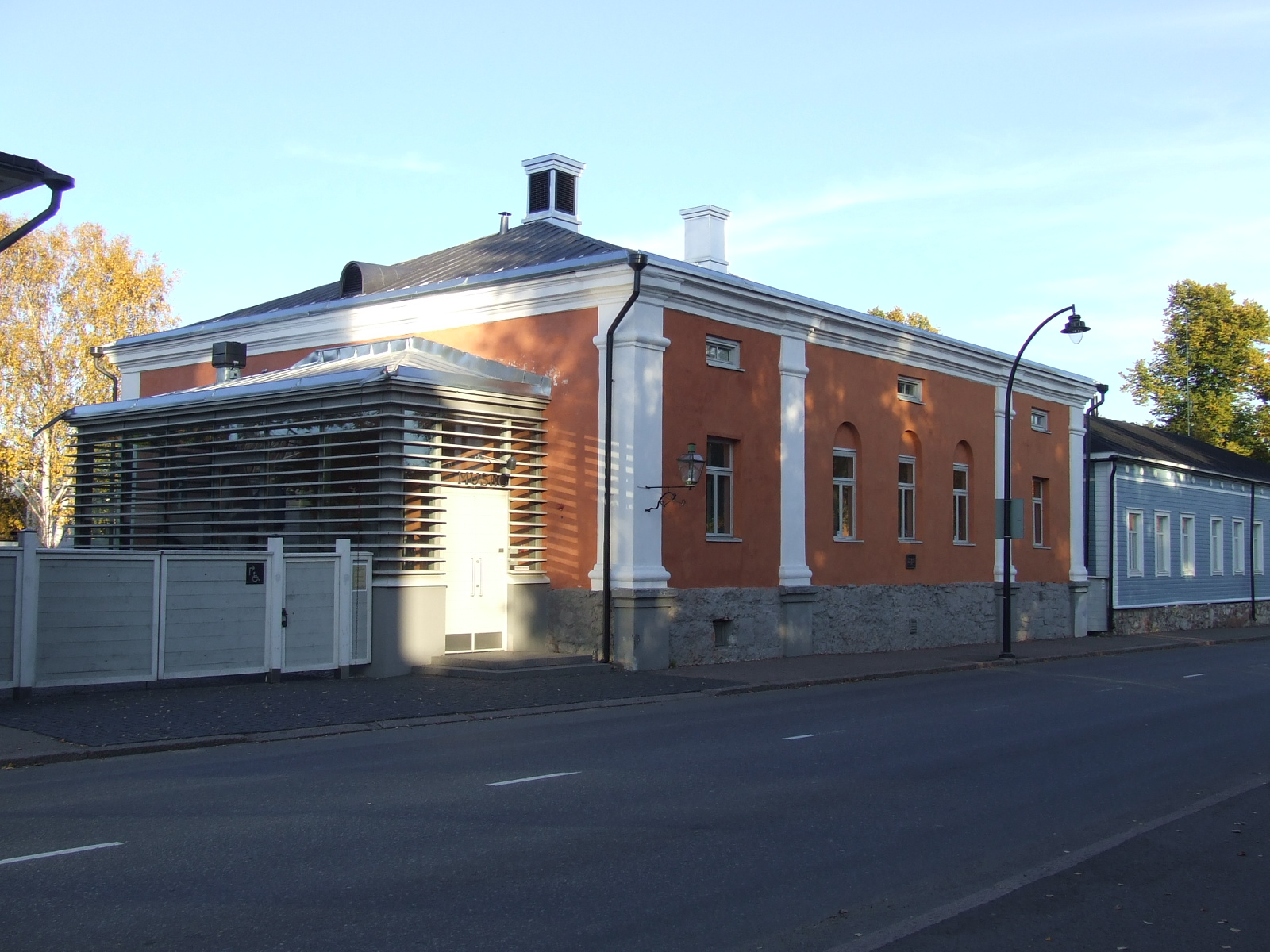
The town museum

== Sports ==
The pesäpallo club Haminan Palloilijat fields teams in both the men's and women's Superpesis national league, playing at Rampart Field.

== Culture ==
=== Food ===
In the 1980s, sauerkraut soup, baked lingonberry porridge and läskisoosi were named Hamina's traditional parish dishes.

=== In popular culture ===
Hamina has served as a source of inspiration for Antti Leinonen, the developer of the 2026-released postapokalyptic video game Road to Vostok; the environment of Hamina and the rest of Southeast Finland was modeled for the game.

== Twin towns ==
- Vordingborg, Denmark
- Falun, Sweden
- Paide, Estonia
- Røros, Norway

== Notable people ==
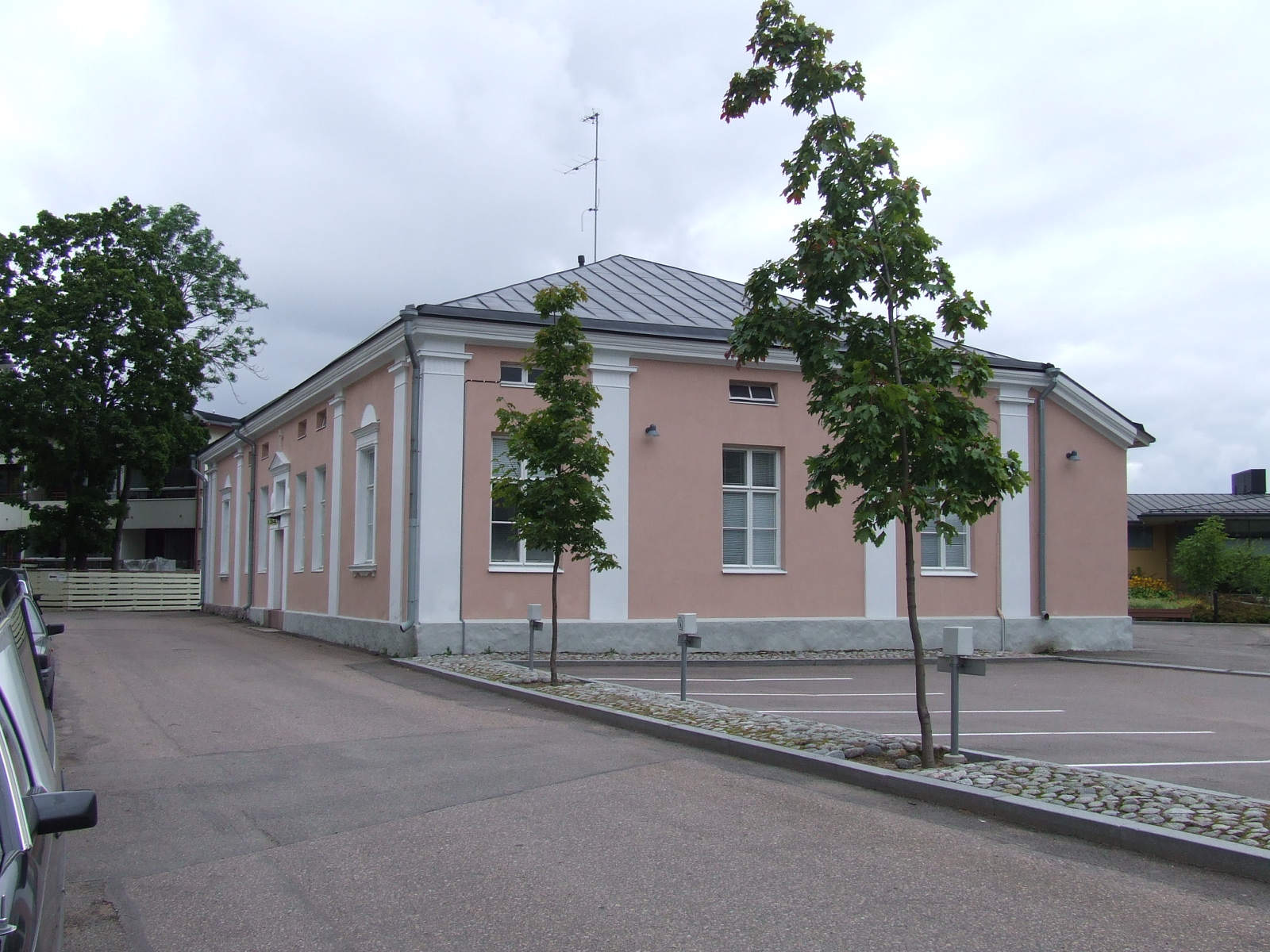
A house called "Herran Kukkaro", the birthplace of painter Hugo Simberg

- Magnus Enckell (1870–1925), symbolist painter
- Simo Häyhä (1905–2002), a farmer and military sniper
- Tapani Kansa (1949–2025), a singer
- Pelle Miljoona (born 1955), a musician
- Hugo Simberg (1873–1917), a painter
- Emilie Mechelin (1838–1917), opera singer and pedagogue
- Leo Mechelin (1839–1914), a professor, statesman, senator and liberal reformer
- Keke Rosberg (born 1949), racing driver
- Meri Toppelius (1863–1896), educational theorist

== See also ==
- Mariehamn
