= Lapinjärvi (village) =

Lapinjärven kirkonkylä Lappträsk Kapellby
- Municipal center
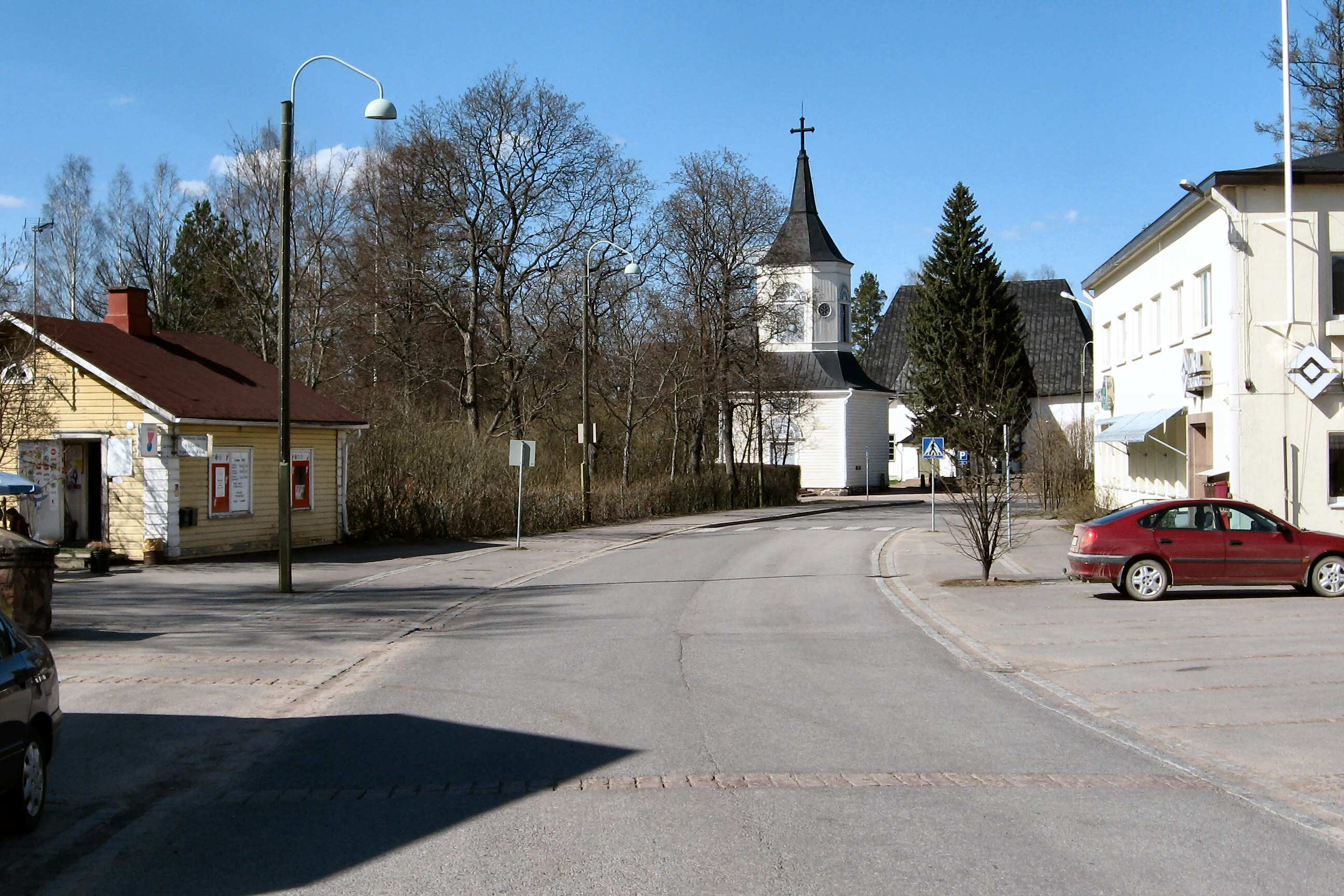
- View from the village

- Location in Finland
- Coordinates: 60°37′25″N 26°11′50″E
- Country: Finland
- Region: Uusimaa
- Municipality: Lapinjärvi

Population (2020-12-31)
  - Total: 706
- Time zone: UTC+2 (EET)
  - Summer (DST): UTC+3 (EEST)
- Postal code: 07800

Lapinjärven kirkonkylä (Swedish: Lappträsk Kapellby, lit. 'Lapinjärvi church village') is the largest village and administrative center of the Lapinjärvi municipality, located on the eastern shore of Lake Lapinjärvi in Uusimaa, Finland. The distance from the village to the southern town of Loviisa is 23 kilometres (14 mi). The main road connection from the church village to Helsinki or Kouvola is Highway 6 (Vt 6), along which the village is located.

The Lapinjärvi village houses most of Lapinjärvi's offices and municipal hall, and Finnish and Swedish-language primary schools also operate there. Sights in the church village include Lieutenant's residence of Brofogdas from the 18th century and the local museum of Kycklings. There are two churches and two cemeteries located in the church village area.

== See also ==
- Myrskylä (village)
