= Siviilipalvelus =

Non-military national service option in Finland for conscientious objectors

Siviilipalvelus (in Finnish; Swedish: civiltjänst; "civilian service") is an alternative service in Finland. It is provided as an alternative to military service for conscientious objectors by Article 127 of the Finnish constitution. The service lasts for 347 days, changed from 395 days in 2008 (not retroactively applied). It can be entered into by filing paperwork indicating that one conscientiously objects to military service.

== History ==
Siviilipalvelus as an alternative was written into law in 1931 (Lex Pekurinen), named after conscientious objector Arndt Pekurinen, although the law was in force only during peace time. Non-religious objections were not allowed until a change of law in 1959. Until 1987, non-religious objections were examined by a Special Commission of Inquiry which was composed of a judge, a military officer, a representative of the social ministry, and a psychiatrist. Today, simply filing the correct paperwork suffices, and as such, many people opt for it simply as an alternative to military service while not having any special objections. An emergency state (in case of war, for example) still allows the usage of Special Commissions of Inquiry.

== Completing service ==
=== Applying ===
Alternative service can be entered into using a form. This form is submitted before service or during military service. If it is submitted during military service, the person must be released from doing military service at once. A community service location for the remaining 11 months should be chosen before entering alternative service for maximum choice. If a suitable location is not found, one will be assigned by the educational centre.

=== Starting service ===
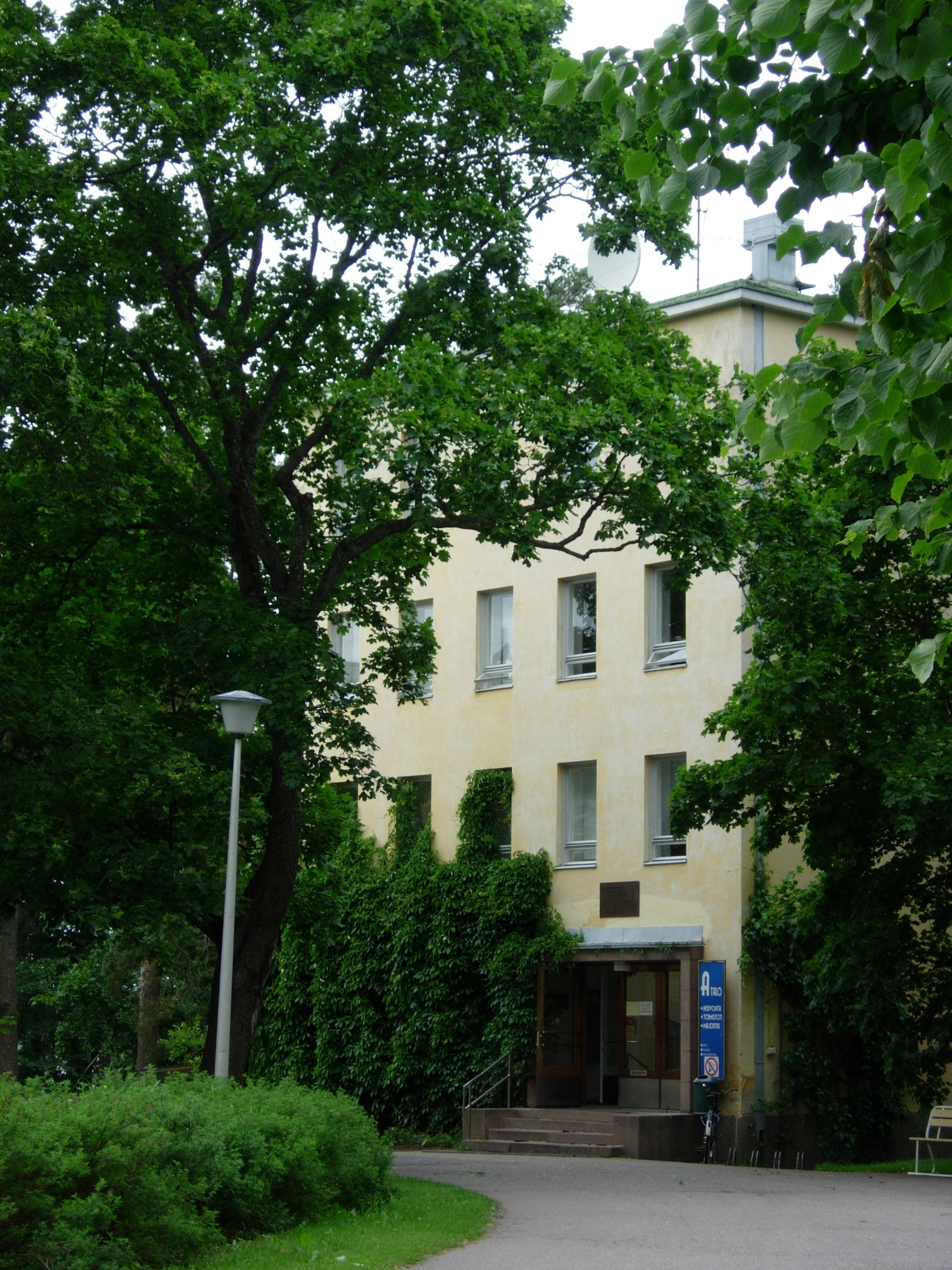
Lapinjärvi Educational Center

Siviilipalvelus begins with a one-month training period at the Siviilipalveluskeskus (Lapinjärvi Educational Center) in Lapinjärvi and continues with approximately 11 months of work duties at an approved non-profit organization or ministry or other government entity. A person cannot perform this service for a political party or trade union or a location from which they are earning income.

=== Benefits ===
Siviilipalveluskeskus provides for housing and food during the training-period.

Housing arrangements are paid or arranged for during work duties by either KELA or the entity where the person is performing their service.

The entity is responsible for paying a food allowance (or providing meals on-site) and daily allowance money to the person performing their service.

18 personal vacation days are provided by law, in addition to 20 days performance vacation days (kuntoisuusloma) may be provided at the entity's discretion. Generally three performance vacation days are given during the training period if an entity where service can be performed has been located beforehand. If needed, 12 days of paternity leave can be provided.

=== Interruption ===
A person may request up to 180 days of personal leave (HSL-loma), but this is not counted into the service period. This is generally granted on a case per case basis.

A person may also be either freed or deferred for three years on medical grounds (C or E class).

=== Discipline ===
If a person completing alternative service does not perform their work duties, the following consequences may occur:

1. Written warning
2. Extension of work duties (at most 4 hours during 5 days)
3. Loss of daily allowance money (at most twice, for 30 days maximum)
4. Loss of personal holidays (at most 4 days per time)

A repeated offense will result in a prison sentence equal in length to half of the remaining service time. This, however, is not marked on a person's criminal record.

=== Service and for-profit work ===
A person undergoing siviilipalvelus is fully permitted to be employed in a company while doing service, but he/she may not engage in both siviilipalvelus and for-profit work at the same company/entity. For-profit work is restricted to free time from siviilipalvelus. Finnish law forbids companies from firing employees merely because they have started siviilipalvelus, although it does not force companies to renew fixed-term contracts, which is a common occurrence.
