= Otto Slätis =

Finnish politician

Otto Wilhelm Slätis (3 August 1864, Lapinjärvi - 12 October 1940) was a Finnish agronomist and politician. He was a member of the Parliament of Finland from 1907 to 1908, representing the Swedish People's Party of Finland (SFP).
