= Gustaf Storgårds =

Finnish politician

Gustaf Storgårds (11 December 1869 in Lapinjärvi – 11 November 1945) was a Finnish Lutheran clergyman and politician. He was a member of the Parliament of Finland from 1913 to 1916, representing the Swedish People's Party of Finland (SFP).
