= Finnish troop production doctrine =

Military doctrine for troop recruitment in Finland

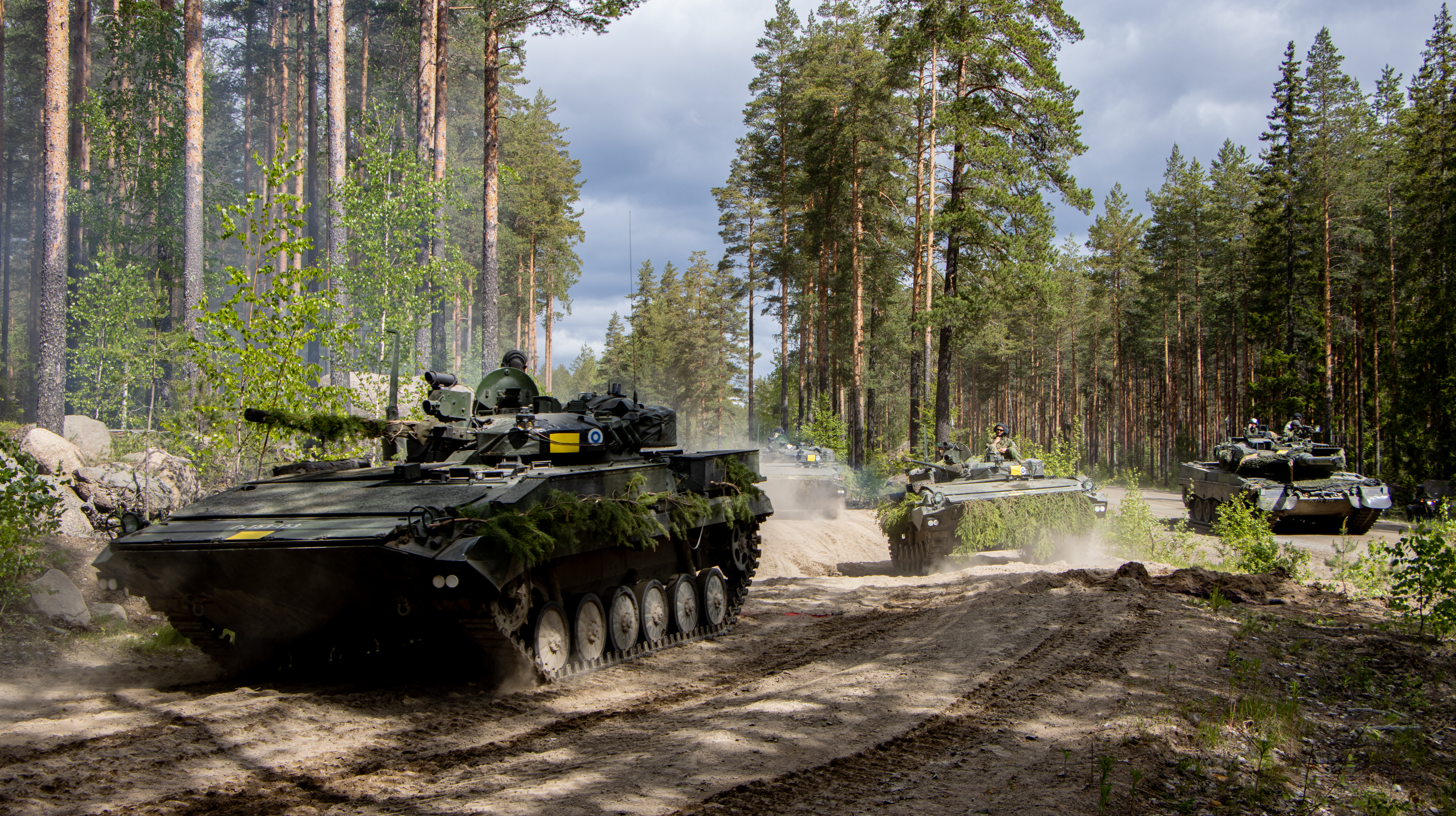
The key idea of the troop production doctrine is that conscript service should produce battle-ready units, like the reinforced mechanised platoon here, which are deployable directly from the reserve, instead of producing trained individuals for later utilisation.

Finnish troop production doctrine, (Finnish: Joukkotuotanto), literally troop production, is the Finnish Defence Forces doctrine for producing combat-capable troops out of conscripts for reserve service. The Troop Production System is one of the key parts of the Finnish Defence System. As such, it is the main method via which Finland generates its deployable forces and maintains its capability to defend itself in a major war. The functioning of the troop production system forms one of the key performance indicators of the Finnish Defence Forces as a whole and its development is one of the interservice-level key programs of the Defence Forces.

== History ==
In the early 1990s, there were clear problems in how Finnish conscript training system worked. The basic idea was that the conscript-training units produced individual soldiers and at the end of their service period, the individual personnel cards were sent to the local military administration for future billeting. In practice, the reservist received a billet only when a unit was sent to a refresher exercise, and its composition was updated from younger reservists, meaning that the youngest ad most freshly-trained reservists were often without a crisis-time billet. In addition, as the conscripts were used for support tasks of peace-time garrisons, there was a chronic shortage of personnel with infantry training and an over-production of conscripts trained for peace-time support tasks.

While there had been some previous, small-scale experiments of billeting reservists directly to war-time units at their demobilisation from conscript service, the full-scale experiments were started with the cohort II/1990. After a year of experimenting with the method, it was noted that the troop production doctrine worked suitably well and could be commenced. From 1998 onwards, the previous system of conscript service terms and service induction dates was modified to serve the troop production system optimally. Also during the 1990s, the conscript leader training was simultaneously modified so that the conscript leaders would personally train their units, with the career staff mainly leading by giving tasks to the conscript leaders. The aim was to give the future reserve officers and NCOs the capability to train and lead their units independently during an eventual mobilisation.

The troop production was a major reform, and required years to transform the culture of the Defence Forces. In particular, it took years to introduce the troop production in the Finnish Air Force and the Finnish Navy, and even then, the Finnish Army is responsible for training many combat support and support units needed by the Navy and the Air Force. The Finnish Border Guard utilises the troop production doctrine for most of its own units, but the Navy produces its coast guard units and Army some of its combat support units. However, for Border Guard, the large number of professional soldiers in war-time units is quite notable, as the Border Guard has relatively high peace-time professional strength compared to the mobilised strength.

== Overview of the system ==
In the Finnish system, all units of the war-time organisation are defined in the "founding task catalogue", (perustamistehtäväluettelo) which lists the units, their equipment and the personnel of the units,based on standardised materiel and personnel types defined for each unit type. Every individual, whether career or reservist, who is billeted in the war-time unit, is in the rolls of some war-time unit, with a defined job, their billet. The maintenance of the Finnish Defence Forces mobilisation capacity is based on maintaining the founding order catalogue, as units will be mobilised, in case of need, based on this catalogue.

Formally, "troop production" is the name used for the type of conscript training that produces troops for the founding task catalogue, instead of individuals. In the Finnish system, war-time troops are produced in three different main methods:

1. The unit is trained as a whole during the conscription of its members and placed in the reserve.
2. After some time, when a new conscript unit has been trained for that unit billet, the former unit is re-billeted as a whole to a new unit, as a secondary billeting.
3. The previous members of that unit are released as individuals to the personnel reserve of local military authority. Some members are individually re-billeted to further war-time duties by that authority.

The general principle is that the operational user of the war-time unit is responsible for training it, both in conscription phase and in refresher exercises. This is in marked contrast to the normal NATO and United States -style force generation process, where there are separate organisations or commands for force generation. For this purpose, each Finnish Defence Forces brigade-equivalent unit receives a certain number of conscripts, pre-classified in two categories: personnel suitable for leadership duties and personnel suitable for rank and file duties. The brigade-equivalent has the duty to produce a certain set of war-time units out of this raw material for its war-time use. However, in certain branches, and in certain specialised unit types, the units may be produced either centrally or by the re-billeting of individuals.

The brigades produce units, depending on the operational needs, with several different methodologies. Continuous production is the most intensive method, used for example for mechanised infantry battalions. In such system, the unit is trained in smaller batches, and a refresher exercise for the whole unit is held when the last batch of its conscripts is in training. Soon after that exercise, the oldest parts of the units are replaced with new personnel from conscript training. While this method maintains high readiness, the problem is that the training equipment wear out fast, and the specially trained reservists are released to the general personnel reserve at a relatively young age. In the most important units, the training cycle may be as short as three years.

When the unit is of such type that its members need to have a suitable median age (e.g certain infantry troops), the unit is trained on regular intervals, allowing the unit to be kept suitably young. When the duty is less onerous physically, but there is a limited number of equipment in the national inventory, the training principle may be that a unit is produced for the lifetime of its main weapon. In such case, the unit is retained in its billet as long as its main equipment is in service, and regular refresher exercises ensure that the users of the weapon system retain their proficiency. This is used typically for units operating missile systems.

In units that have relatively plenty of equipment in the inventory and a non-arduous duty, the unit may be trained for the service lifetime of its personnel. This is the case, for example, for field artillery, where the unit personnel composition is almost the same for all non-self-propelled batteries. In such case, the war-time units can be trained for long times in peace-time units whose composition is optimised for the training mission, without markedly changing the operations pattern from year to year.

Some units are billeted directly from the general personnel reserve, not utilising the troop production. This is the case especially for units requiring civilian education, as in medical and information warfare units, or for personnel in different headquarters and staff elements. Also the units of the local defence companies (Finnish: maakuntajoukot) are billeted directly from selected personnel on individual basis.

== Training in practice ==
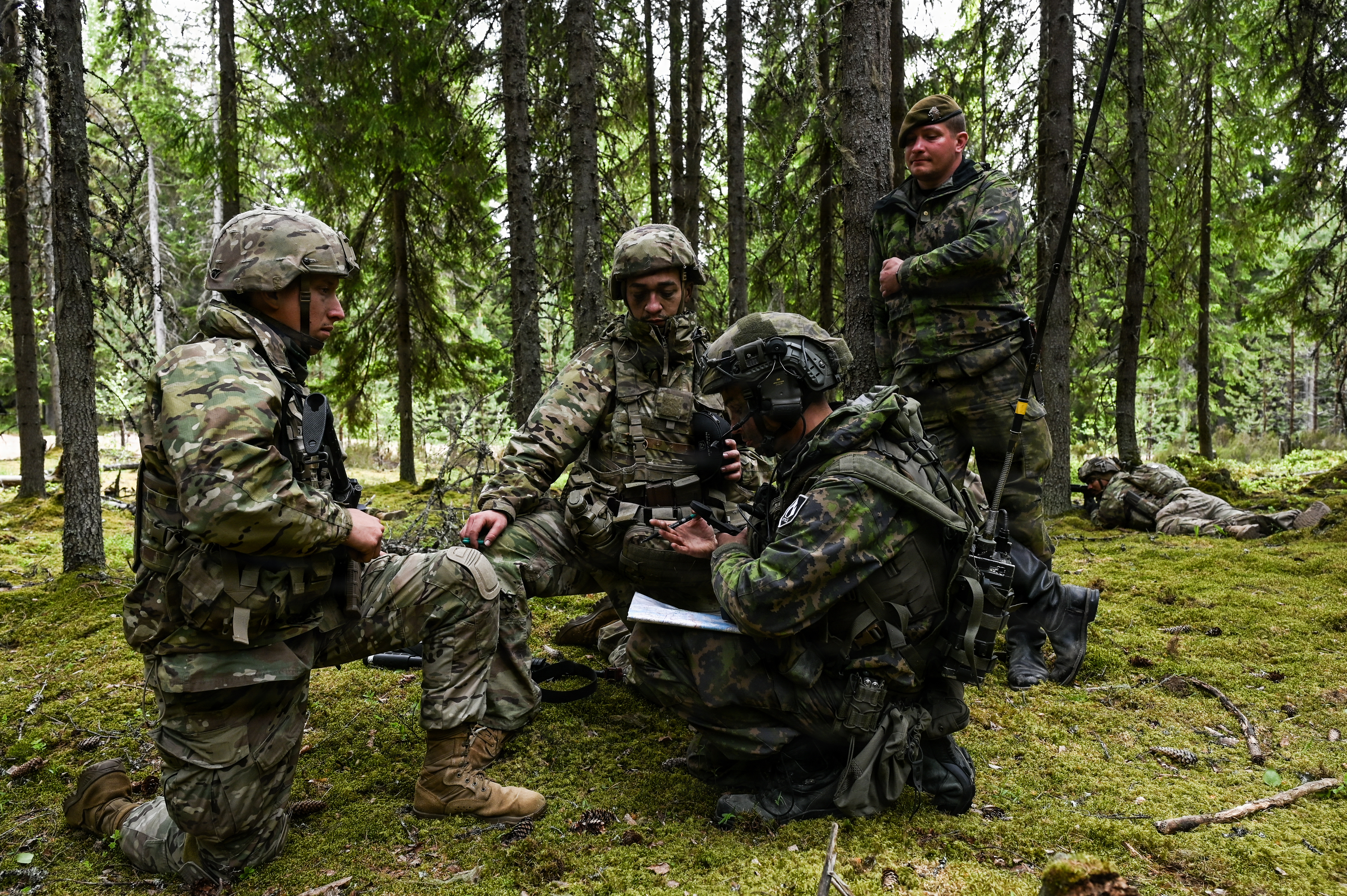
A typical situation in conscript training: the conscript leader (wearing camouflage and combat equipment, and acting as the leader of a combat unit) confers with the leaders of an allied unit during a major exercise, while a career lieutenant (left, with the baret, functioning as the trainer) oversees the conscript practicing to command his unit.

For most unit types, the basic pattern of training is based on the fact that the rank and file serves 5.5, the personnel trained as NCOs and reserve officers for 11.5 months. This means that in a typical conscript unit, there are two types of conscripts: the leaders (NCOs and officer cadets) who have served already six months and have been promoted to conscript leader ranks, and rank and file, who have entered service.

The typical unit receives a number of recruit personnel calculated to cover the personnel need for the war-time unit and the unavoidable losses during the training. In addition, the recruit contingent is dimensioned so that the necessary leaders for the next batch of recruits can be selected and trained. The recruits have been, before this, selected for units and pre-classified for suitability in the draft board assemblies (kutsunnat), organised by the military regional offices.

The unit undergoes the whole service period together, with the same professional staff responsible for training the conscripts during the basic training, branch-specific and specialised training and the final exercises. The conscript leaders act as the leaders of their squads and platoons, and the units are formed to their war-time composition from a relatively early part of training. Each squad is living in a common barracks room and in the exercises, in the same tent and the squads of platoon are located as close to each other as possible. All training events are done according to the war-time platoon and squad organisation. The training is finalised in the major exercises of the conscript cohort, typically a corps or brigade-level military exercise, where the unit applies its training in challenging live-fire exercises and two-sided combat exercises. Thus, the unit achieves a rather good level of internal cohesion, which, in the Finnish Defence Forces thought, is considered to result in a combat-capable unit.

== See also ==
- Group cohesion
- Military reserve
- Mobilization
