= Reserve Officer School (Finland) =

- Insignia of the Reserve Officer School
- Active: 1920–1942: Reserviupseerikoulu; 1942–1945: Upseerikoulu; 1948– Reserviupseerikoulu
- Country: Finland
- Branch: Finnish Army
- Type: Military school
- Role: Reserve officer training
- Size: 200 conscripts, 250 career personnel, 700 students during courses
- Part of: Army Academy
- Garrison: Hamina
- Nicknames: Rukki, Ruk
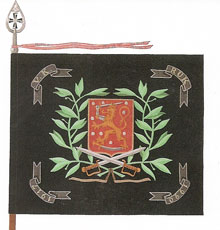
- Colors
- March: Heroes pugnate
- Decorations: Order of the Cross of Liberty

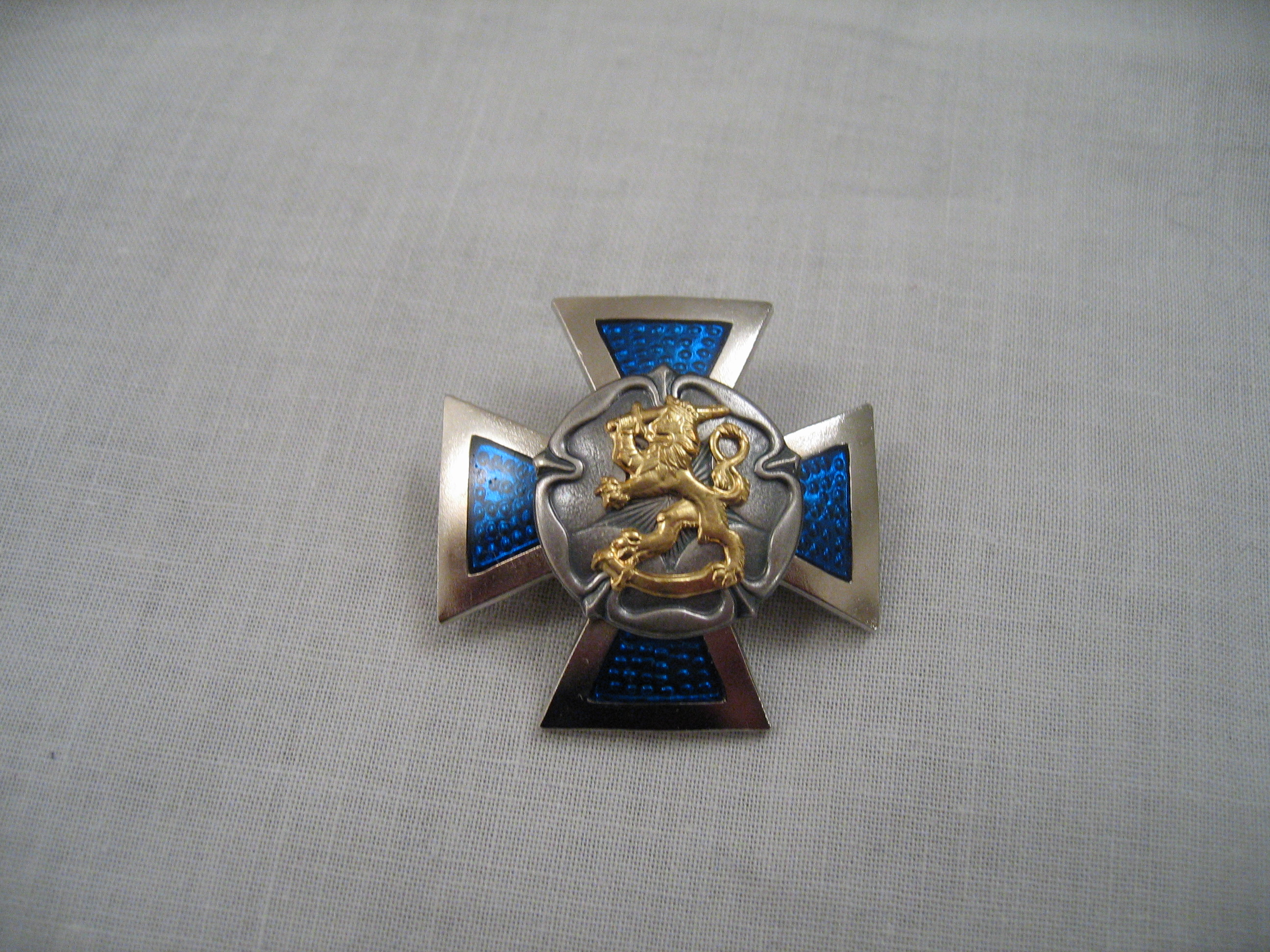
The badge of Reserve Officer Course

The Reserve Officer School (Finnish: Reserviupseerikoulu, RUK), located in Hamina, Finland, near the southeastern border, is responsible for the training of most Finnish reserve officers.

== Organisation ==
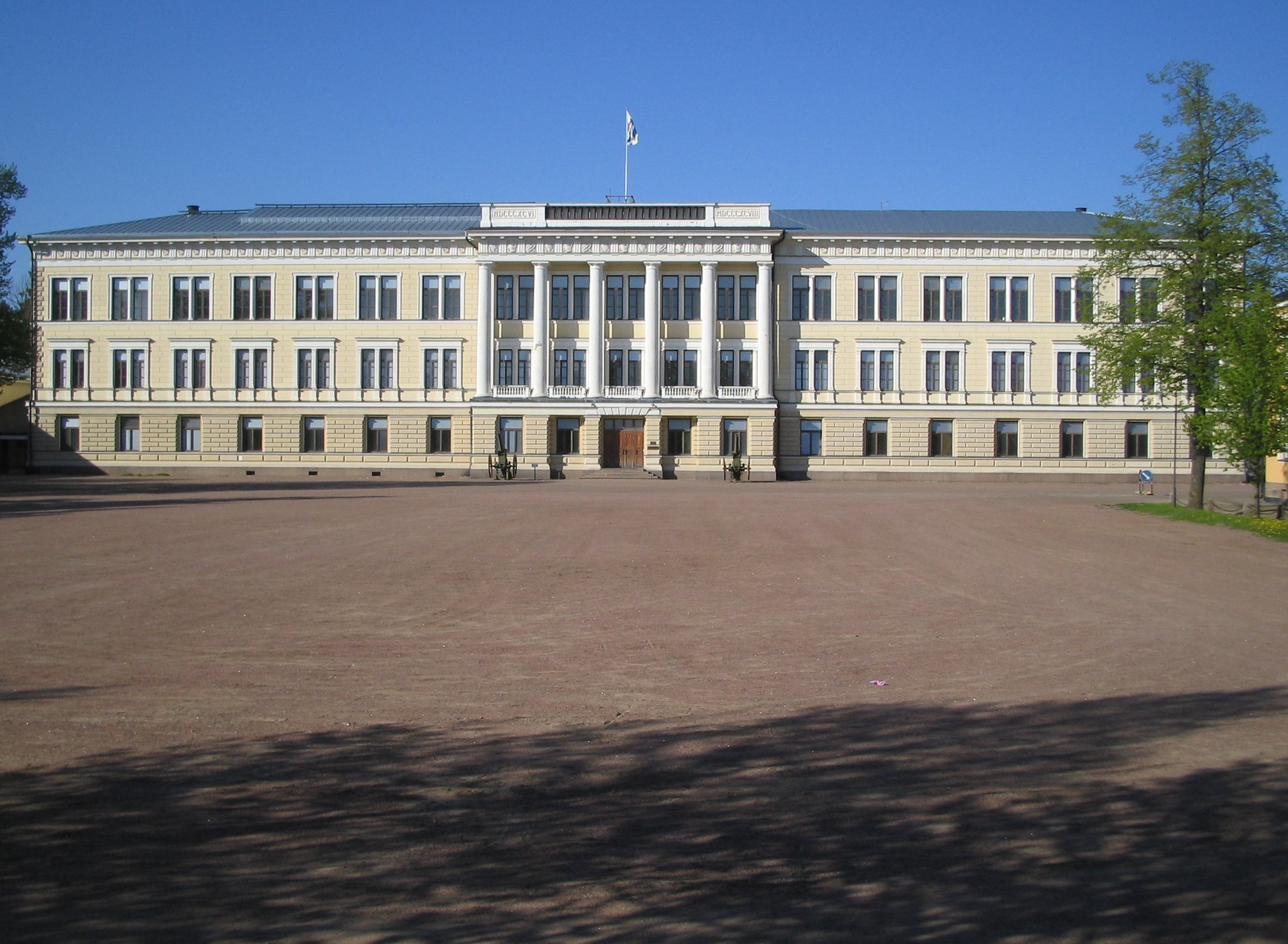
The main building of the Reserve Officer School in Hamina

The school organises two yearly courses of some 700 men and women. The School is organized into a five companies of reserve officer students and two supporting companies. The Reserve Officer course is organised at five companies:

- Spearhead Company (Finnish: Kärkikomppania): infantry platoon leader and artillery forward observers
- Reconnaissance Company (Finnish: Tiedustelukomppania): reconnaissance platoon and squad leaders, and artillery forward observers
- Firing Battery (Finnish: Tulipatteri): mortar platoon leaders, battery officers for artillery, artillery reconnaissance officers, various officer duties in anti-aircraft artillery and Naval and Air Force command centres
- Engineer Company (Finnish: Pioneerikomppania): combat engineer platoon leaders, EOD detachment leaders, anti-CBRN platoon leaders and anti-tank missile platoon leaders
- Headquarters and Signal Company (Finnish: Esikunta- ja Viestikomppania): signals officers for various duties, logistics officers and military police officers.

In addition to the five companies of the Reserve Officer Course, the School has two companies consisting of ordinary conscripts:

- Jäger Company (Finnish: Jääkärikomppania), training military police companies and medics for FDF reserve. The company also organizes the NCO course for the conscripts of the Army Academy on military police and transportation fields.
- Transportation Company (Finnish: Kuljetuskomppania), training drivers for FDF reserve.

Organizationally, Reserve Officer School is a battalion-level unit which belongs to the Army Academy. The unit was founded in 1920 and has operated continually with a single break from 1945 to 1947 when the Finnish officer training was stopped by order of the Allied Control Commission. Since its founding, the school has been situated in Hamina, with the exception of wartime 1939–45, when the school was evacuated to Niinisalo in Kankaanpää. During the years 1942–45, the school operated under the name of Officer School (Finnish: Upseerikoulu). Since 1920, the School has trained over 174,000 reserve officers for the Finnish Defence Forces.

== The Status of Reserve Officer ==
Within the Finnish Defence Forces, the vast majority of officers advance through the ranks during their conscription, instead of being commissioned from without for a separate career path. As the Finnish Defence Forces has a war-time strength of 280,000 troops, with career personnel numbering only a small fraction of that, th Defence Forces sees it necessary to train a relatively large reserve of junior officers who can fulfil most officer vacancies of the mobilised force.

At the end of the basic training of eight weeks, some conscripts are selected for extra training as reserve NCOs (Finnish: reservin aliupseeri). After the seven-week phase I of the NCO school, usually organised in the brigade the conscript is serving in, some NCO students are selected to become reserve officers, who are trained at the Reserve Officer School. Both the reserve NCOs and reserve officers serve for 11.5 months, while the majority of rank-and-file conscripts serve for 5.5 months.

The competition for admission into Reserve Officer School is hard, and only about 7 per cent of the conscript cohort are selected for reserve officer training. A typical officer student is a 20-year-old graduate of the academic track of high school (Finnish: lukio) who has already started their university studies.

Reserve Officer School trains reserve officers, most of whom do not continue in active service but are demobilised to the reserve at the end of their conscription. Their service obligation as reservists continues until the age of 65. The reserve officers do not have a military standing while in reserve but when called to active service, reserve officers rank with career officers. The activation may take place for voluntary exercises, for obligatory refresher exercises or, in emergencies, for extraordinary service or for mobilisation. Based on their performance during service in the reserve, reserve officers may be promoted to higher ranks, as their duties become more demanding. The highest rank for which reserve officers are eligible is major (in the Navy, lieutenant commander), and in extremely rare cases, lieutenant colonel (in the Navy, commander). The war-time duties allocated to such senior reserve officer are commensurate with their rank. All officer promotions are decided by the President of Finland, both for career and reserve officers.

Since 1923, the training of a reserve officer is also an obligatory prerequisite for attending the National Defence University, and most cadets of the National Defence University have graduated the regular reserve officer course. Those conscript NCOs who are accepted to the National Defence University, are selected on the condition of passing a platoon-leader course that gives the equivalent training as the Reserve Officer School.

== The Training in the Reserve Officer School ==
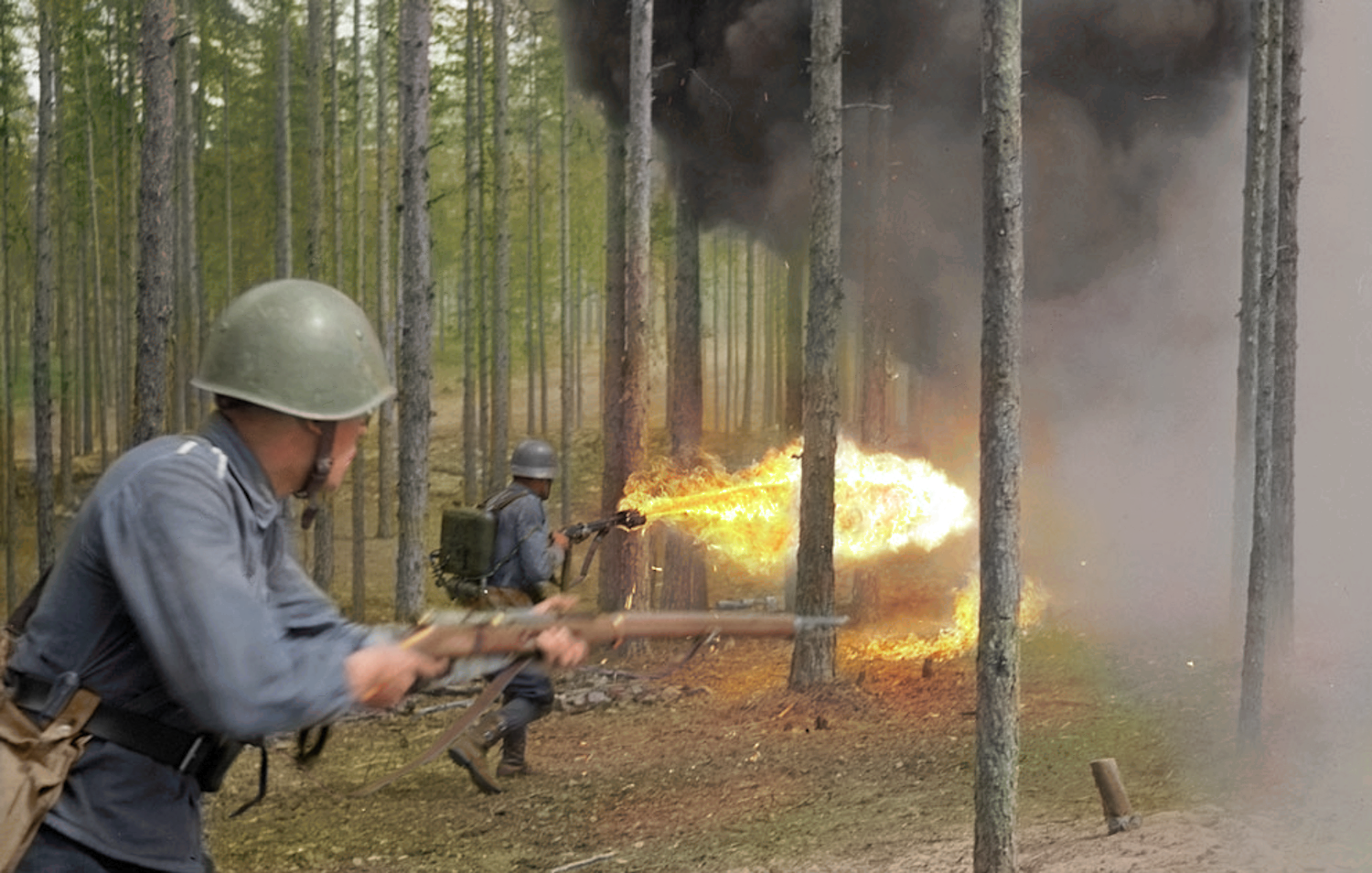
Flamethrower used in exercises in the Reserve Officer School during World War II.

After the first seven weeks of the NCO course, those most suitable for Reserve Officer training are selected on the basis of the first phase of NCO school, the branch-specific training phase and the basic conscript phases. Thus, at the beginning of the Reserve Officer Course, the officer student has served six weeks as a recruit private, six weeks in the branch-specific training and seven weeks in the NCO course.

In the Reserve Officer School students receive training for the duties of platoon leader (or equivalent). During the course, the officer students (Finnish: upseerioppilas) rank senior to corporal, but carry a specific insignia of one small lozenge. The curriculum includes studies in leadership, tactics, branch-specific skils and physical education. The education aims to inculculate the sense of responsibility for the country and other people, as well as honesty, reliability and good manners. The ideal officer should be the best soldier of their platoon, while simultaneously physically and emotionally capable of leading it, planning its action and taking care of its logistics. However, the most important aspect of the education is to inculculate a correct attitude towards the duties of an officer.

The course is divided in two parts: during the first seven weeks, the officer students learn the basics of the tactical leadership of their branch. The next seven weeks are used for the ever more strenuous exercises that allow the students to see the combined arms action and practice, in their own turn, leadership by leading their peers in simulated combat, as the school functions as a combined-arms battalion battlegroup. Numerous simulator systems are used to enhance the learning environment both in the classroom and in the field.

After a 14-week course, the students are promoted to officer cadets (Finnish: upseerikokelas) and sent to their 'home' garrisons to train their wartime platoons. During this time, they rank as sergeants, junior to career personnel but senior to conscript sergeants. The rest of the conscript service of the officer cadets consists of guided troop practice where the officer cadets train and lead a conscript platoon in the garrison and in field exercises. After three and half months' service as officer cadets, the officer cadets are promoted second lieutenants and discharged.

As the training of the Reserve Officer School is based on the typical organisation and South-Eastern Finnish landscape, an important facet of the troop practice period is to allow the officer student to learn the tactics, equipment and organisation proper to their actual war-time unit, as well as the environment where it is supposed to fight. According to the troop production doctrine (Finnish: joukkotuotantoperiaate), the reserve officers are placed in the war-time unit with the NCOs and men they have been leading during their troop practice. Should mobilisation take place, the same unit would return to service with the same complement as during the conscription. In particular, the training of the troop and its officer cadets in the "home" brigade should be always targeted to produce a unit that has been specifically trained to execute its planned first war-time mission as well as possible.

Traditionally, the training of a reserve officer has carried certain social distinction and has been tied to high positions in industry and economy. E.g. former Nokia CEO Jorma Ollila was the Chairman of his Reserve Officer course. According to a 2015 study, the reserve officers have widely seen the training to benefit them in their working life, especially in the early stages of their career. The key benefit seen by the alumni is the exposure to the practical leadership opportunities, not so much the theoretical leadership training.

The high educational level of most reserve officers offers the Finnish Defence Forces a chance to fill many wartime vacancies on the basis of civilian professions. For instance, a manager of a civilian transportation company might have a wartime placement as a brigade-level logistics officer. Conscripts who are medical students or doctors are usually given special training to become reserve medical officers.

== Other Reserve Officer Training ==
Some special branches carry out their own reserve officer training. Among these the reserve officer course of special operations units in the Utti Jaeger Regiment and the armoured troops' reserve officer course of the Armoured Brigade. Navy reserve officers are trained in Naval Academy and Air Force reserve officers in Air Force Academy, but all these courses include only those training branches that do not exist in the Reserve Officer School and can be best trained in a base where the necessary materiel and trainer personnel already exist. Also the Navy and Air Force officers of the branches that are trained in the Reserve Officer School get their training in Hamina, as Reserve Officer School training environment, with multiple branches trained at the same location, allows the practical exercising of combined arms tactics.

Those reserve NCOs who show, during their service in the reserve, exceptional dedication and suitability for officer duties, may be trained on a separate aliupseerista upseeriksi (NCO to officer) course. Typically, they have a civilian occupation or profession that makes them ideal candidates for a wartime position requiring officer training. The FDF website cites ideal examples of a lawyer who would be trained to serve as a wartime military lawyer or a construction engineer who would serve as a heavy earthmoving equipment platoon leader.

Such courses are organised annually by the Reserve Officer School, together with the National Defence Training Association of Finland. The courses start in October with the reserve officer course of the conscripts who started their service in July and end in July with the reserve officer course of the conscripts who started serving in January. During this time, the reservists participate in 40 days of training and exercises in the Reserve Officer School, in addition to a large amount of distance-education. The reservists who pass the course are promoted second lieutenants on the Finnish Independence Day of the same year.

The Reserve Officer School also organises, in conjunction with the conscript course, the Military Leadership Course (Finnish: sotilasjohtamisen kurssi), which gives a training corresponding the reserve officer training to those Finnish Defence Forces personnel who have at least NCO training but require a reserve officer training for service as chaplains or specialist officers (e.g. medical officers or engineering officers).

== Continuous education ==
The Reserve Officer School organizes also continuous education of FDF reservists. One of the best known educational events is the yearly "branch-specific trainer course" (Finnish: aselajikouluttajakurssi). The course yearly trains some 200–300 Defence Forces reservists who are active as trainers of the National Defence Training Association of Finland (MPK, Maanpuolustuskoulutusyhdistys). The training includes face-to-face periods organised as voluntary activations and a period distance learning, finally culminating in an obligatory activation for a refresher exercise. The aim is to unify the training of Defence Force reservists nationally by making sure that the trainers of the National Defence Association use the correct, up-to-date doctrine. As the target group of the trainer recruitment of MPK is the war-time leaders of reservist units, the trainer courses also allow the war-time leaders to better train their own unit both in peace-time exercises and in an eventual mobilisation.
