= Lapinjärvi =

Municipality in Uusimaa, Finland

Lapinjärvi Lapinjärvi – Lappträsk
- Municipality
- Lapinjärven kunta Lappträsks kommun
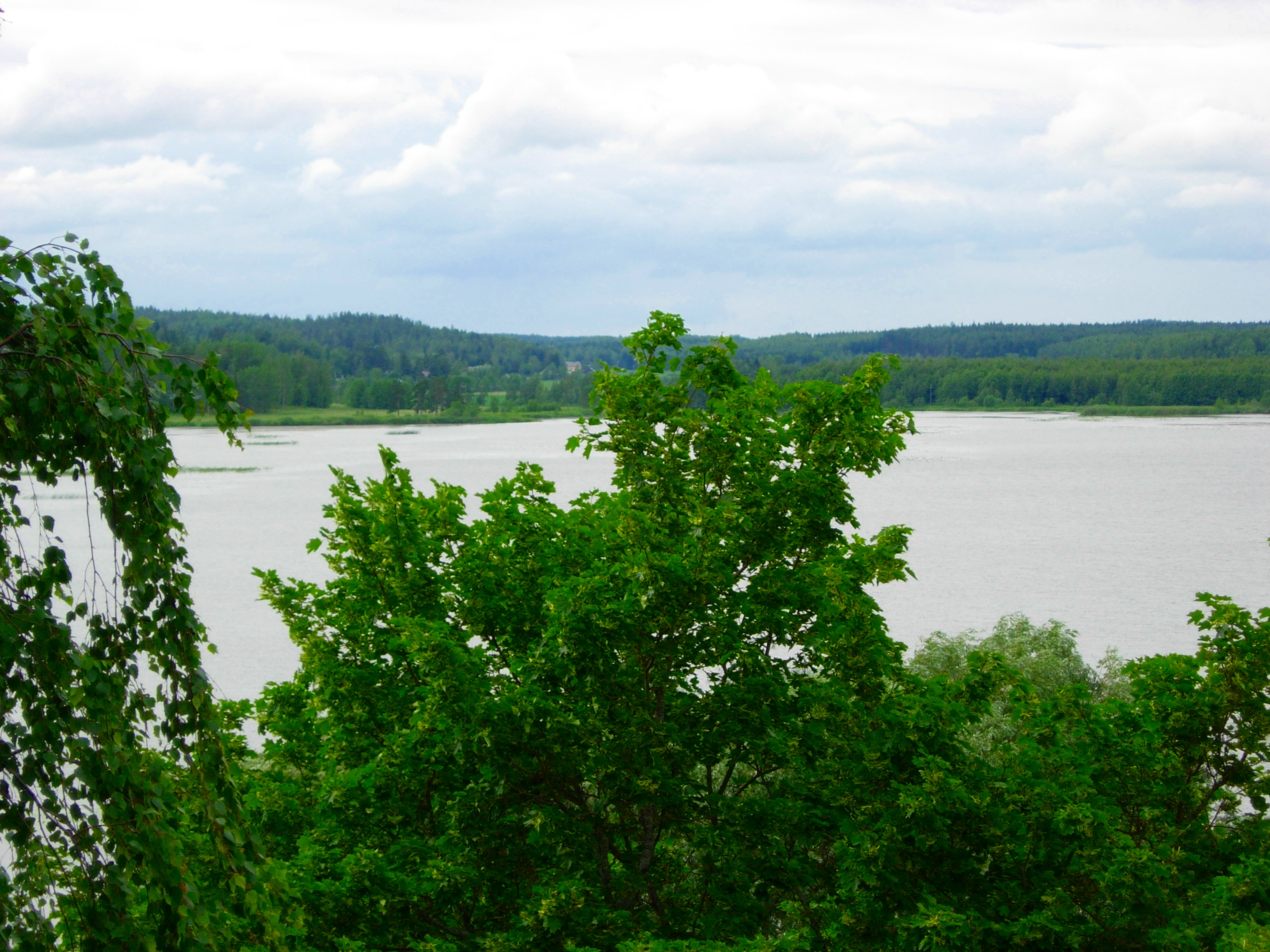
- Lake Lapinjärvi

- Coat of arms

- Location of Lapinjärvi in Finland
- Interactive map of Lapinjärvi
- Coordinates: 60°37′N 026°12′E
- Country: Finland
- Region: Uusimaa
- Sub-region: Loviisa
- Charter: 1575
- Seat: Lapinjärvi (Kirkonkylä)

Government
  - Municipal manager: Christian Sjöstrand

Area (2018-01-01)
  - Total: 339.31 km^{2} (131.01 sq mi)
  - Land: 329.89 km^{2} (127.37 sq mi)
  - Water: 9.44 km^{2} (3.64 sq mi)
  - Rank: 227th largest in Finland

Population (2025-12-31)
  - Total: 2,430
  - Rank: 237th largest in Finland
  - Density: 7.37/km^{2} (19.1/sq mi)

Population by native language
  - Finnish: 63.6% (official)
  - Swedish: 28.6% (official)
  - Others: 7.9%

Population by age
  - 0 to 14: 14.6%
  - 15 to 64: 55.6%
  - 65 or older: 29.8%
- Time zone: UTC+02:00 (EET)
  - Summer (DST): UTC+03:00 (EEST)
- Climate: Dfb
- Website: lapinjarvi.fi

Lapinjärvi (Finnish pronunciation: [ˈlapinˌjærʋi]; Swedish: Lappträsk) is a municipality in Finland, located in the southern interior of the country. Lapinjärvi is situated in the eastern part of the Uusimaa region. The population of Lapinjärvi is approximately 2,000, while the sub-region has a population of approximately 17,000. It is the 237th most populous municipality in Finland.

Lapinjärvi covers an area of 339.31 square kilometres (131.01 sq mi) of which 9.44 km^{2} (3.64 sq mi) is water. The population density is 7.37 inhabitants per square kilometre (19.1/sq mi).

Neighbouring municipalities are Iitti, Kouvola, Loviisa, Myrskylä and Orimattila.

Lapinjärvi is a bilingual municipality with Finnish and Swedish as its official languages. The population consists of 64% Finnish speakers, 29% Swedish speakers, and 8% speakers of other languages.

Lake Lapinjärvi is located near the administrative village center in Lapinjärvi.

== Politics ==
Results of the 2011 Finnish parliamentary election in Lapinjärvi:

- Swedish People's Party 33.2%
- Centre Party 16.8%
- True Finns 16.2%
- National Coalition Party 11.2%
- Social Democratic Party 10.4%
- Green League 4.3%
- Left Alliance 3.9%
- Christian Democrats 2.1%

== People born in Lapinjärvi ==
- Gustaf Rosenqvist (1855–1931)
- Vilhelm Rosenqvist (1856–1925)
- Hilda Käkikoski (1864–1912)
- Otto Slätis (1864–1940)
- Johan Strömberg (1868–1952)
- Gustaf Storgårds (1869–1945)
- Mikko Innanen (b. 1978)

== See also ==
- Lapinjärvi Educational Center
