= Lake Lapinjärvi =

Lapinjärvi
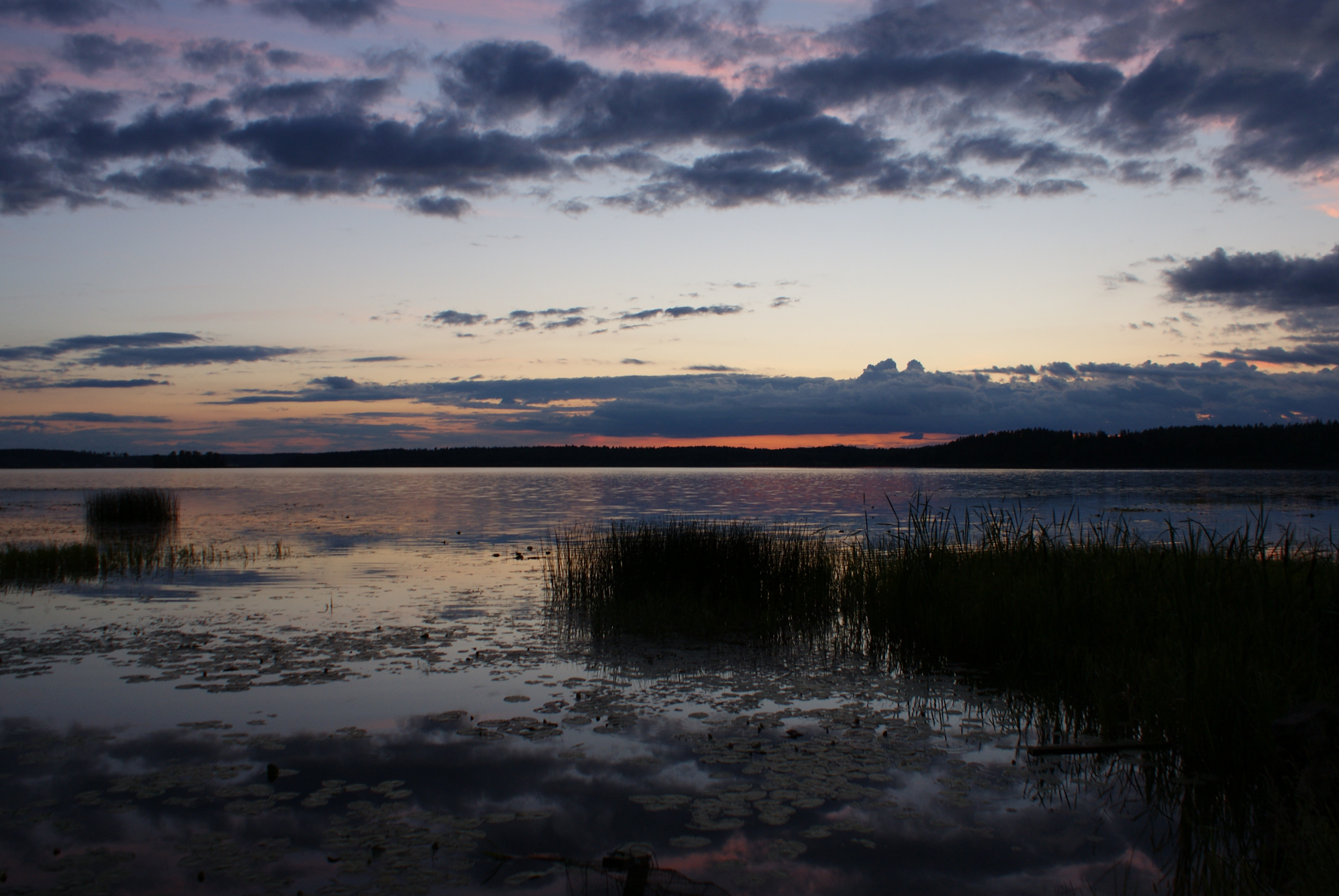

- Location within Finland
- Location: Lapinjärvi
- Coordinates: 60°37′45″N 26°10′15″E
- Type: Lake
- Primary outflows: River Loviisanjoki
- Catchment area: Loviisanjoki
- Basin countries: Finland
- Surface area: 5.16 km^{2} (1.99 sq mi)
- Average depth: 1.96 m (6 ft 5 in)
- Max. depth: 2.61 m (8 ft 7 in)
- Water volume: 0.0101 km^{3} (8,200 acre⋅ft)
- Shore length^{1}: 11.49 km (7.14 mi)
- Surface elevation: 24.5 m (80 ft)
- Frozen: December–April
- Islands: none
- ^{1} Shore length is not a well-defined measure.

Lapinjärvi (Swedish: Lappträsket) is a rather small lake in the middle of the Lapinjärvi municipality in Uusimaa region, Finland. There are 27 small lakes in Finland with the same name.
