= List of road churches in Finland =

List of the road churches in Finland in 2012

Church	Municipality
Alatornion kirkko (fi:Alatornion kirkko)	Tornio
Alavuden kirkko (fi:Alavuden kirkko)	Alavus
Aleksanterin kirkko	Tampere
Anttolan kirkko	Mikkeli, Anttola
Apostolien Pietarin ja Paavalin sekä Pappismarttyyri Blasioksen kirkko	Pielavesi
Askaisten kirkko	Masku
Ekenäs kyrka	Raseborg, Ekenäs
Elimäen kirkko	Kouvola, Elimäki
Engelin kirkko	Kärsämäki
Enontekiön (Hetan) kirkko	Enontekiö, Hetta
Espoo Cathedral	Espoo
Euran kirkko	Eura
Forssan kirkko	Forssa
Fredrika Sofian kirkko	Ikaalinen
Gabrielin kirkko aka. Alajärvi church	Alajärvi
Halikko Church	Salo, Halikko
Hangö kyrka - Hangon kirkko	Hanko
Hartola Church	Hartola
Hattuvaaran pyhien apostolien Pietarin ja Paavalin tsasouna	Ilomantsi, Hattuvaara
Pyhän Johannes Kastajan kirkko	Hauho
Haukipudas Church	Haukipudas
Hausjärven kirkko	Hausjärvi
Heinolan kirkko	Heinola, Heinolan maalaiskunnan alue
Heinävesi Church	Heinävesi
Himangan kirkko	Kalajoki, Himanka
Hollolan Pyhän Marian kirkko	Hollola
Honkiniemen kirkko	Ähtäri
Hyrynsalmen kirkko	Hyrynsalmi
Hyvinkää Church	Hyvinkää
Hämeenlinnan kirkko	Hämeenlinna
Iin kirkko	Ii
Ilmajoen kirkko	Ilmajoki
Ilomantsin evankelis-luterilainen. kirkko	Ilomantsi
Inarin kirkko (Saamelaiskirkko)	Inari
Ingå kyrka - Inkoon kirkko	Ingå
Irjanteen kirkko	Eurajoki
Isonkyrön vanha kirkko	Isokyrö
Jaalan kirkko	Kouvola, Jaala
Jalasjärven kirkko	Jalasjärvi
Joensuu Church	Joensuu
Johanneksen kirkko	Hamina
Joroisten kirkko	Joroinen
Joutsan kirkko	Joutsa
Jumalanäidin Tihvinäläisen ikonin kirkko	Liperi, Viinijärvi
Juvan kirkko	Juva
Jämijärven kirkko	Jämijärvi
Jämsän kirkko	Jämsä
Kaarlelan kirkko - Karleby kyrka	Kokkola
Kairosmajan Revontulikappeli	Pelkosenniemi
Kajaani Church	Kajaani
Kalajoen kirkko	Kalajoki
Kalannin Pyhän Olavin kirkko	Uusikaupunki, Kalanti
Kangasalan kirkko	Kangasala
Kangasniemi Church	Kangasniemi
Kankaanpään kirkko	Kankaanpää
Kannuksen kirkko	Kannus
Kanta-Loimaan kirkko	Loimaa
Karjalohjan kirkko	Karjalohja
Karuna Church	Sauvo
Kauhajoen kirkko	Kauhajoki
Kauhavan kirkko	Kauhava
Kaupunginkirkko	Jyväskylä
Kaustisen kirkko	Kaustinen
Kemi Church	Kemi
Kerimäki Church	Kerimäki
Central Pori Church	Pori
Kesälahden kirkko	Kesälahti
Keuruun kirkko	Keuruu
Kihniön kirkko	Kihniö
Kiiminki Church	Kiiminki
Kiteen kirkko	Kitee
Kittilän kirkko	Kittilä
Kiuruveden kirkko	Kiuruvesi
Klamilan kyläkirkko	Virolahti, Klamila
Klaukkala Church	Nurmijärvi, Klaukkala
Kolarinsaaren vanha kirkko	Kolari
Church of the Three Crosses	Imatra
Konginkankaan kirkko	Äänekoski, Konginkangas
Konneveden kirkko	Konnevesi
Kontiolahden kirkko	Kontiolahti
Korpilahden kirkko	Jyväskylä, Korpilahti
Kotkan evankelis-luterilainen kirkko	Kotka
Kouvolan Keskuskirkko	Kouvola
Kristuksen Kirkastumisen kirkko	Haapajärvi
Kristuksen kirkastumisen kirkko	Kajaani
Kristuksen tulemisen kirkko	Siilinjärvi
Kristuksen ylösnousemuksen kirkko	Jyväskylä
Kuhmon kirkko	Kuhmo
Kuopio Cathedral	Kuopio
Kuoreveden kirkko	Jämsä, Kuorevesi
Kurikan kirkko	Kurikka
Kurun kirkko	Kuru
Kustaa Aadolfin kirkko	Iisalmi
Kuusankosken kirkko	Kouvola, Kuusankoski
Kvevlax kyrka	Korsholm
Kymin kirkko	Kotka
Kyyjärven kirkko	Kyyjärvi
Kärkölän kirkko	Kärkölä
Laihian kirkko	Laihia
Lakeuden Risti Church	Seinäjoki
Lapinlahden kirkko	Lapinlahti
St. Mary's Church of Lappee	Lappeenranta, Lappee
Lapua Cathedral	Lapua
Larsmo kyrka	Larsmo
Finlayson Church	Tampere
Lauritsala Church	Lappeenranta
Lehtimäen kirkko	Alajärvi, Lehtimäki
Lentiiran kirkko	Kuhmo, Lentiira
Leppävirran kirkko	Leppävirta
Lestijärven kirkko	Lestijärvi
Liedon Pyhän Pietarin kirkko	Lieto
Lohtajan (Sophia Magdalenan) kirkko	Kokkola, Lohtaja
Lokalahden kirkko	Uusikaupunki, Lokalahti
Lopen kirkko	Loppi
Lopen Vanha kirkko	Loppi
Luopioisten kirkko	Pälkäne
Maaningan kirkko	Maaninka
St. Mary's Church, Turku	Turku
Malax kyrka	Malax
Marian kappeli	Kittilä
Marian kirkko	Hamine
S:t Görans kyrka	Mariehamn
Maskun kirkko	Masku
Merikarvian kirkko	Merikarvia
Mikkelin maaseurakunnan kirkko	Mikkeli
Mikkeli Cathedral	Mikkeli
Muhoksen kirkko	Muhos
Muurame church	Muurame
Muuruveden kirkko	Juankoski
Mynämäen kirkko	Mynämäki
Mäntsälän kirkko	Mäntsälä
Mäntyharjun kirkko	Mäntyharju
Mäntän kirkko	Mänttä-Vilppula
Naantalin kirkko	Naantali
Nastolan kirkko	Nastola
Nilsiän kirkko	Nilsiä
Nivalan kirkko	Nivala
Noormarkun kirkko	Pori
Nousiaisten Pyhän Henrikin kirkko	Nousiainen
Nurmeksen evankelis-luterilainen kirkko	Nurmes
Bomban tsasouna	Nurmes
Nurmijärvi church	Nurmijärvi
Nurmon kirkko	Seinäjoki, Nurmo
Oravais kyrka - Oravaisten kirkko	Vörå
Oriveden kirkko	Orivesi
Otaniemi Chapel	Espoo
Oulaisten kirkko	Oulainen
Oulu Cathedral	Oulu
Oulunsalon kirkko	Oulunsalo
Padasjoen kirkko	Padasjoki
Paltamon kirkko	Paltamo
Paltamon vanha kirkko	Paltamo
Parikkalan kirkko	Parikkala
Parkanon kirkko	Parkano
Pattijoen Metsäkirkko	Raahe, Pattijoki
Pedersöre Church	Jakobstad
Perhon kirkko	Perho
Peräseinäjoen kirkko	Seinäjoki
Petäjäveden kirkko	Petäjävesi
Pieksämäen Vanha kirkko	Pieksämäki
Pielaveden kirkko	Pielavesi
Pielpajärven erämaakirkko	Inari
Pihtiputaan kirkko	Pihtipudas
Piippolan kirkko	Siikalatva, Piippola
Pirkkalan kirkko	Pirkkala
Pohjan Pyhän Marian kirkko - Pojo, S:ta Maria kyrka	Raseborg
Polvijärven Pyhän Johannes Kastajan kirkko	Polvijärvi
Pomarkun kirkko	Pomarkku
Pomarkun vanha puukirkko	Pomarkku
Poison kirkko	Posio
Profeetta Elian kirkko	Iisalmi
Pudasjärven kirkko	Pudasjärvi
Pulkkilan kirkko	Siikalatva, Pulkkila
Puolangan kirkko	Puolanka
Puumalan Johannes Kastajan kirkko	Puumala
Pyhäjoen kirkko	Pyhäjoki
Pyhämaan uhrikirkko	Uusikaupunki
Pyhämaan uusi kirkko	Uusikaupunki
Pyhän Birgitan kirkko	Lempäälä
Pyhän Hengen kirkko	Outokumpu
Pyhän Henrikin kirkko	Pyhtää
St. Catherine's Church, Turku	Turku
Pyhän Laurin kirkko	Janakkala
Pyhän Laurin kirkko	Salo
Church of St. Lawrence, Vantaa	Vantaa
Pyhän Margareetan kirkko	Vehmaa
Pyhän Mikaelin kirkko	Keminmaa
Pyhän Mikaelin kirkko	Laitila
Pyhän Mikaelin kirkko - St. Mikaels kyrka	Kirkkonummi
Pyhän Nikolaoksen katedraali	Kuopio
Pyhän Nikolaoksen kirkko	Kotka
St. Olaf's Church, Ulvila	Ulvila
Pyhän profeetta Elian kirkko	Ilomantsi
Church of the Holy Cross, Rauma	Rauma
Pyhännän kirkko	Pyhäntä
Pyhärannan kirkko	Pyhäntä
Pälkäneen kirkko	Pälkäne
Raahen Pyhän Kolminaisuuden kirkko	Raahe
Raision Pyhän Martin kirkko	Raisio
Rajamäen kirkko	Nurmijärvi
Rantsilan kirkko	Siikalatva
Rengon Pyhän Jaakon kirkko	Hämeenlinna
Revonlahden kirkko	Siikajoki
Riistaveden kirkko	Kuopio
Ristiinan kirkko	Ristiina
Ristijärven kirkko	Ristijärvi
Ristinkirkko	Lahti
Rovaniemen kirkko	Rovaniemi
Ruhtinansalmen kirkko	Suomussalmi
Ruokolahden kirkko	Ruokolahti
Ruotsinpyhtään kirkko	Loviisa
Rymättylän Pyhän Jaakobin kirkko	Naantali
Saarijärven kirkko	Saarijärvi
Saloisten Pyhän Olavin kirkko	Raahe
Sammatin kirkko	Lohja
Sammonlahden kirkko	Lappeenranta
Samuelin kirkko	Haapajärvi
Sarvijoen rukoushuone	Kurikka
Sastamalan Pyhän Marian kirkko	Sastamala
Sauvo Church	Sauvo
Savonlinnan Pikkukirkko	Savonlinna
Savonlinna Cathedral	Savonlinna
Seurakuntakeskuksen kirkko	Tervola
Sievin kirkko	Sievi
Sipoon vanha kirkko - Sibbo gamla kyrka	Sipoo
Someron kirkko	Somero
Sotkamon kirkko	Sotkamo
Sumiaisten kirkko	Äänekoski
Suomussalmen kirkko	Suomussalmi
Sysmän Pyhän Olavin kirkko	Sysmä
Säräisniemen kirkko	Vaala
Sääksmäen kirkko	Valkeakoski
Taipalsaaren kirkko	Taipalsaari
Taivalkosken kirkko	Taivalkoski
Tampere Orthodox Church	Tampere
Tapiola Church	Espoo, Tapiola
Taulumäki Church	Jyväskylä
Tenala kyrka	Raseborg
Tervolan Isokirkko	Tervola
Tervolan Vanha kirkko	Tervola
Tervon kirkko	Tervo
Teuvan kirkko	Teuva
Tiistenjoen kyläkirkko	Lapua
Toholammin kirkko	Toholampi
Toivakan kirkko	Toivakka
Tornion kirkko	Tornio
St Michael's Church, Turku	Turku
Turku Cathedral	Turku
Pyhän Birgitan kirkko	Hämeenlinna, Tuulos
Tuusniemen kirkko	Tuusniemi
Tuusulan kirkko	Tuusula
Törnävän kirkko	Seinäjoki, Törnävä
Ullavan kirkko	Kokkola, Ullava
Urjalan kirkko	Urjala
Utajärven kirkko	Utajärvi
Utran kirkko	Joensuu
Uudenkaupungin uusi kirkko	Uusikaupunki
Uudenkaupungin vanha kirkko	Uusikaupunki
Trefaldighetskyrkan	Vaasa
Valamon luostarin Kristuksen Kirkastumisen kirkko	Heinävesi
Vampulan kirkko	Huittinen, Vampula
Vanajan kirkko	Hämeenlinna
Varkauden pääkirkko	Varkaus
Vihdin kirkko	Vihti
Vihdin Pyhän Birgitan kirkon rauniot	Vihti
Viinikan kirkko	Tampere, Viinikka
Viitasaaren kirkko	Viitasaari
Vimpelin Pyöreä kirkko	Vimpeli
Virolahden kirkko	Virolahti
Virtain pääkirkko	Virrat
Virtasalmen kirkko	Pieksämäki
Vuolijoen kirkko	Kajaani, Vuolijoki
Vuosaaren Merimieskirkko	Helsinki
Vähänkyrön kirkko	Vähäkyrö
Ylistaron kirkko	Seinäjoki, Ylistaro
Ylivieskan kirkko	Ylivieska
Ylöjärven kirkko	Ylöjärvi
Ylösnousemuksen kirkko	Juankoski

The meaning of the names are: kappeli, chapel; kirkko, church; tuomiokirkko, cathedral.
