= 1892 in architecture =

The year 1892 in architecture involved some significant events.

== Events ==
- July 8 – Great Fire of 1892 destroys many buildings in St. John's, Newfoundland.
- October 21 – The World Columbian Exposition is dedicated in Chicago (open to the public in 1893). Many of the world's best and brightest architects design what will be known as the "White City"; the planner for the exposition is Daniel Burnham.
- François Hennebique patents his system of reinforced concrete.

== Buildings and structures ==
=== Buildings ===
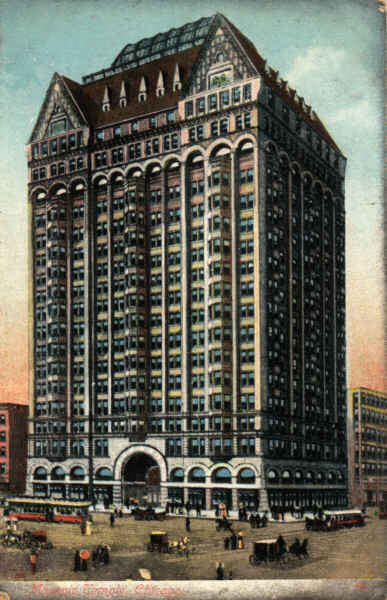
Masonic Temple (Chicago)

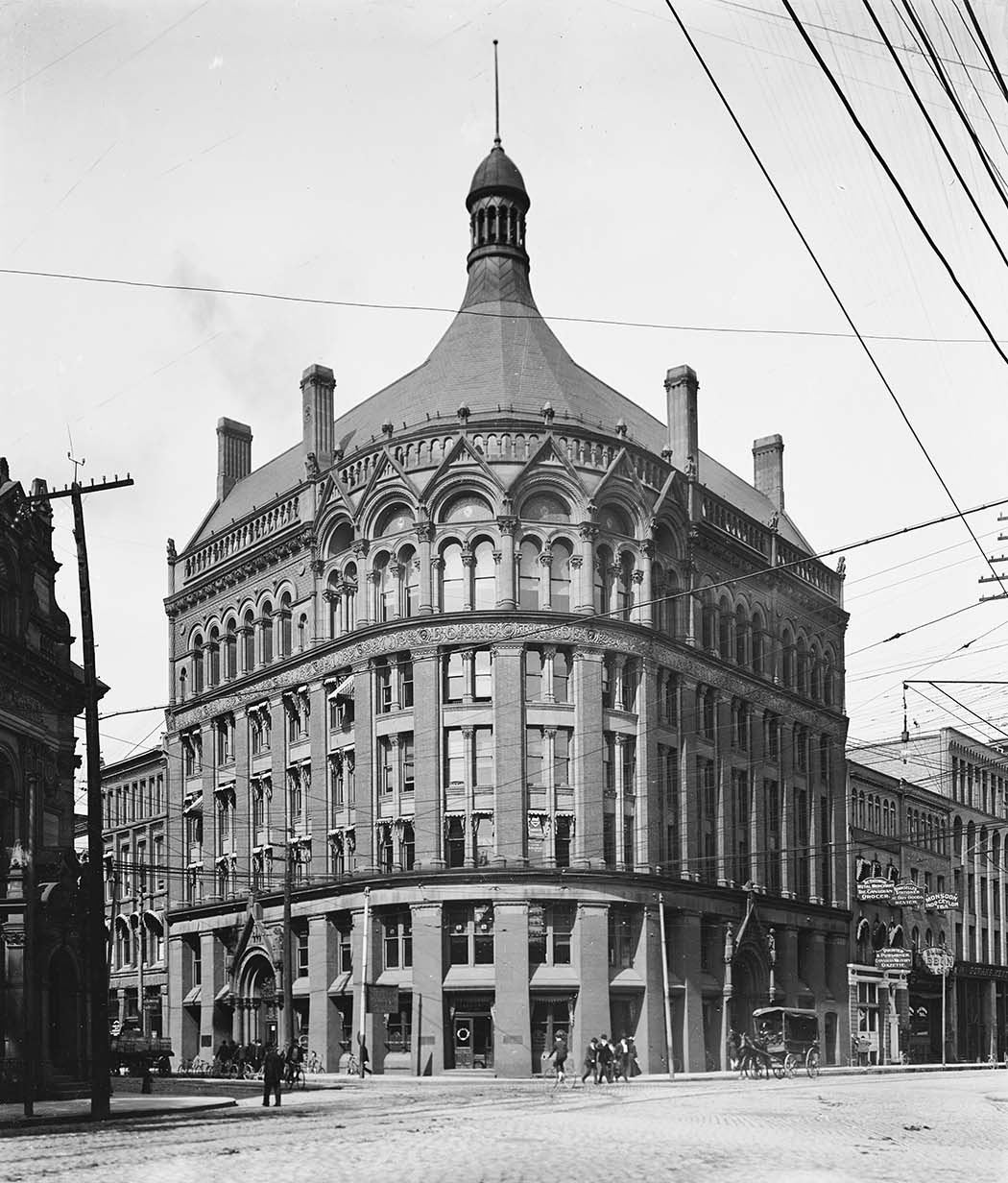
Toronto Board of Trade Building

- Heinävesi Church, the largest wooden church in Finland, designed by Josef Stenbäck and built in 1890–1891, is dedicated.
- Cathedral of St Michael and St George, Aldershot, England, designed by military engineers.
- Boardman Hall at Cornell University, designed by William Henry Miller
- West front of All Saints, Ennismore Gardens, south London (modern-day Russian Orthodox Cathedral), designed by Charles Harrison Townsend.
- Masonic Temple (Chicago), designed by Burnham and Root.
- Regional parliament of Alsace-Lorraine, Strasbourg, designed by August Hartel and Skjold Neckelmann.
- Buenos Aires City Hall, designed by Juan Cagnoni.
- Palace of Justice Building, Rosario, Argentina, designed by Herbert Boyd Walker.
- Town hall of Nieuwer-Amstel, Netherlands.
- Courthouse and Jail, Esbjerg, Denmark, designed by Hans Christian Amberg.
- Government House, Bermuda, designed by William Cardy Hallet.
- Soldiers' and Sailors' Arch, Brooklyn, New York, designed by John H. Duncan.
- Toronto Board of Trade Building, designed by James & James.
- Natural History Building, University of Illinois at Urbana–Champaign, designed by Nathan Clifford Ricker.
- Monopol Hotel, Breslau.
- Hotel Petersberg, Germany.
- Theater Unter den Linden, Berlin, designed by Fellner & Helmer.
- Provincial Theatre (Deželno gledališče), Ljubljana, Slovenia (Austria-Hungary), designed by Jan Vladimír Hráský and Anton Hruby.
- Grillo-Theater, Essen, Germany.
- Teatro de Cristóbal Colón, Bogotá, Colombia, designed by Pietro Cantini.
- Cirkus (Stockholm).
- Madrid Atocha railway station, Spain, designed by Alberto Palacio with Gustave Eiffel.
- Ramses Station, Cairo, Egypt.
- Mills Building (San Francisco), designed by D. H. Burnham & Company.
- General Post Office, Leeds, England, designed by Henry Tanner.
- Youth's Companion Building, Boston, Massachusetts, designed by Henry W. Hartwell and William Cummings Richardson.
- Page Belting Company Mills, Concord, New Hampshire.
- Templeton's Carpet Factory, Glasgow, Scotland, designed by William Leiper.

== Awards ==
- RIBA Royal Gold Medal – César Daly.
- Grand Prix de Rome, architecture: Guillaume Tronchet.

== Births ==
- March 4 – Rose Connor, American architect (died 1970)
- April 8 – Richard Neutra, Austrian American modernist architect (died 1970)
- June 19 – Ejnar Mindedal Rasmussen, Danish Neoclassical architect (died 1975)

== Deaths ==
- January 27 – Philip Charles Hardwick, English architect (born 1822)
- December 23 – John Gibson, English architect (born 1817)
