= Nurmon Jymy (pesäpallo) =

Finnish pesäpallo club

- Founded: 1925; 100 years ago
- Ground: Haalin kenttä 1931–1980; Skaala-areena 1981– (Nurmo, Seinäjoki)
- Owner: Nurmon Jymy ry
- Chairman: Pia Karjanlahti
- Manager: Aulis Paski
- League: Superpesis

Nurmon Jymy is a pesäpallo club in Seinäjoen Nurmossa. Nurmo is a former municipality of Finland and now part of Seinäjoki. Nurmon Jymy's primary team played in the professional division in Finland Superpesiksessä until 2012 and their secondary team played in the national league. After the 2011 season Nurmon Jymy came together with Seinäjoen Maila-Jussit and formed Jymy-Jussit this team then entered the professional baseball division Superpesis. The club plays its home games in Hyllykallio in their home field Skaala-areena. The club reached its audience record in 2005 in the final match against Kiteen Pallo -90. The estimated number of viewers is about 4290 people. In 2005 the team won silver in Superpesis, 2006 they achieved 5th and 4th in 2007.

== History ==
Nurmon Jymy was established 5 March 1925. The name Jymy was selected from an extensive list of possible names. When established junior teams Ylipään Kaverir and Alapään Koitto merged. The reason behind this was the shortage of funds of the two teams. The merging was done by many significant personnel, such as Kustaa Pihlajamäki and Kyösti Luukko. The first chairman of team was Viljo Peltola. The city of Nurmo had been interested in baseball like sports for a long time. The citizens of Nurmo use to play sports in the Civil Guard( White Civil Guard) and in 1924 they won the championship of the district in pesäpallo.

== Hall of Fame ==
=== Awarded ===
| Vuoden lukkari: Kustaa Rasku (1956) | Lyöjäkuningas: Veikko Martikkala (1959) | Etenijäkuningas: Henri Puputti (2006) | Vuoden tulokas: Antti Piuhola (2004); Jukka-Pekka Vainionpää (2009) |

=== East-West -players ===
- Jussi Kitinoja (1951, 1955, 1956, 1958)
- Sakari Mannila (1956)
- Kustaa Rasku (1956, 1958, 1961)
- Esa Risku (1961, 1962)
- Taisto Tikkanen (1966)
- Aulis Paski (1967)
- Martti Yli-Jaskari (1967)
- Mauno Yli-Soini (1970)
- Jouko Martikkala (1976)
- Markku Haapasalmi (1977)
- Erkki Lahti (1985)
- Antti Piuhola (2004)
- Antti Kataja-Rahko (2004)
- Teijo Kankaanpää (2004, 2005)
- Mikko Vainionpää (2005)
- Antti Tokkari (2005, 2006)
- Antti Kuusisto (2005, 2006, 2007, 2008)
- Henri Puputti (2005, 2006, 2007, 2008)
- Tommi Murto (2006)
- Henri Heinäheimo (2008)
- Juha Niemi (2010)

== Standings and rankings ==
=== Achievements ===
Nurmon Jymy has achieved 3 medals in the professional league, of those three two were bronze and one silver. The bronze medals were achieved in 1956 and 2008. Silver medal was achieved in 2005. The team won Pesäpallon Suomen Cup in 1978. The team has won 4 medals in indoor pesäpallo (Talvisuper) which has some modified rules. They won silver in 2004 and 2005 and bronze in 2006 and 2007.

=== Game Masters ===
- 1950-luku Erkki Kurikka
- 1960-luku Veikko Lahti
- 1964 Kustaa Rasku
- 1965 Juho Niemistö
- 1970-luku Veikko Lahti, Markku Latikka
- 1976 Veikko Lahti
- 1977–1978 Esa Risku
- 1979–1981 Raimo Rajala
- 1982–1983 Oiva Lilli
- 1984 Tuomo Olli
- 1985 Jouko Martikkala
- 1986 Kari Kiiskilä
- 1987 Tuomo Olli
- 1988–1989 Juhani Kukkasela
- 1990 Oiva Lilli
- 1991–1993 Veikko Puiras
- 1994–1995 Risto Ojanperä
- 2000–2001 Marko Hakala
- 2002–2003 Pasi Tyynelä
- 2004 Mauri Pyhälahti
- 2005–2008 Jussi Järvinen
- 2009 Jari Mäkelä, 8.7 alkaen Jussi Järvinen
- 2010–2011 Antti Piuhola
- 2012– Jarmo Ania

=== Seasons in different leagues ===
| Tier | Years | Durations |
|---|---|---|
| Top league | 25 | 1955–1960, 1962, 1967–1971, 1975, 1977–1978, 1985, 1987, 2004–2011 |
| Tier 2 | 40 | 1931, 1946–1954, 1961, 1963–1966, 1972–1974, 1976, 1979–1984, 1986, 1988–1990, 1992–1997, 2000–2003 |
| Tier 3 | 9 | 1933–1937, 1945, 1991, 1998–1999 |
| Tier 4 | 2 | 1938–1939 |

=== Men ===
| Regular season | | | | | | | | | | Playoffs | | | | | | | |
| Kausi | League | M | W | T | L | Runs | RC | Pts. | Place | M | W | T | L | Runs | RC | Pts. | Place |
| 1931 | B-sarja | 2 | 2 | 0 | 0 | 23 | 7 | 4 | 1. | 1 | 1 | 0 | 0 | 29 | 10 | 2 | 1. |
| 1931 | B-sarja intermediate | Jymy – Oulun Pyrintö 21–5 | | | | | | | | 3 | 0 | 0 | 3 | 11 | 26 | 0 | 4. |
| 1932 | Did not participate | | | | | | | | | | | | | | | | |
| 1933 | B-sarja | 2 | 0 | 1 | 1 | 15 | 17 | 1 | 3. | | | | | | | | |
| 1934 | B-sarja | 2 | 0 | 0 | 2 | 4 | 10 | 0 | 3. | | | | | | | | |
| 1935 | B-sarja | 2 | 1 | 0 | 1 | 17 | 27 | 2 | 2. | | | | | | | | |
| 1936 | B-sarja | | | | | | | | | | | | | | | | |
| 1937 | B-sarja | | | | | | | | | | | | | | | | |
| 1938 | B-sarja | 2 | 1 | 0 | 1 | 27 | 46 | 2 | 3. | | | | | | | | |
| 1939 | B-sarja | 8 | 5 | 0 | 3 | 104 | 58 | 10 | 2. | | | | | | | | |
| 1940 | Cancelled due to World War II | | | | | | | | | | | | | | | | |
| 1941 | Cancelled due to World War II | | | | | | | | | | | | | | | | |
| 1942 | Cancelled due to World War II | | | | | | | | | | | | | | | | |
| 1943 | Cancelled due to World War II | | | | | | | | | | | | | | | | |
| 1944 | Cancelled due to World War II | | | | | | | | | | | | | | | | |
| 1945 | Maakuntasarja | 4 | 3 | 0 | 1 | 22 | 5 | 6 | 1. | | | | | | | | |
| 1946 | Suomensarja | 8 | 5 | 0 | 3 | 72 | 67 | 10 | 2. | 3 | 1 | 0 | 2 | 13 | 21 | 2 | 3. |
| 1947 | Suomensarja | 8 | 5 | 0 | 3 | 53 | 44 | 10 | 4. | | | | | | | | |
| 1948 | Suomensarja 1 | 7 | 2 | 0 | 5 | 37 | 39 | 4 | 7. | | | | | | | | |
| 1949 | Suomensarja | 10 | 7 | 1 | 2 | 116 | 40 | 15 | 3. | | | | | | | | |
| 1950 | Suomensarja | 10 | 7 | 0 | 3 | 114 | 60 | 14 | 5. | | | | | | | | |
| 1951 | Suomensarja | 9 | 7 | 1 | 1 | 103 | 42 | 15 | 2. | 3 | 1 | 0 | 2 | 26 | 19 | 2 | 3. |
| 1952 | Suomensarja | 8 | 5 | 0 | 3 | 94 | 41 | 10 | 4. | | | | | | | | |
| 1953 | Suomensarja | 8 | 6 | 0 | 2 | 107 | 31 | 12 | 3. | | | | | | | | |
| 1954 | Suomensarja | 8 | 7 | 0 | 1 | 84 | 21 | 14 | 2. | 2 | 2 | 0 | 0 | 14 | 8 | 4 | 1. |
| 1955 | SM-sarja | 12 | 5 | 3 | 4 | 88 | 58 | 13 | 4. | | | | | | | | |
| 1956 | SM-sarja | 14 | 11 | 1 | 2 | 66 | 36 | 23 | 3. | | | | | | | | |
| 1957 | SM-sarja | 14 | 8 | 0 | 6 | 82 | 89 | 16 | 5. | | | | | | | | |
| 1958 | SM-sarja | 14 | 7 | 4 | 3 | 88 | 74 | 18 | 6. | | | | | | | | |
| 1959 | SM-sarja | 14 | 7 | 0 | 7 | 93 | 128 | 14 | 9. | | | | | | | | |
| 1960 | SM-sarja | 14 | 6 | 0 | 8 | 61 | 69 | 12 | 12. | | | | | | | | |
| 1961 | Suomensarja | 10 | 10 | 0 | 0 | 98 | 30 | 20 | 1. | | | | | | | | |
| 1962 | SM-sarja | 14 | 4 | 2 | 8 | 87 | 96 | 10 | 12. | Puurtilan Kisa-Pojat – Jymy 6–3 | | | | | | | |
| 1963 | Suomensarja | 9 | 7 | 2 | 0 | 109 | 42 | 16 | 2. | Ulvilan Pesä-Veikot – Jymy 4–0 | | | | | | | |
| 1964 | Suomensarja | 12 | 10 | 0 | 2 | 179 | 58 | 20 | 2. | | | | | | | | |
| 1965 | Suomensarja | 12 | 10 | 0 | 2 | 179 | 91 | 20 | 2. | | | | | | | | |
| 1966 | Suomensarja | 12 | 11 | 0 | 1 | 181 | 73 | 22 | 1. | | | | | | | | |
| 1967 | SM-sarja | 22 | 10 | 0 | 12 | 176 | 202 | 20 | 9. | | | | | | | | |
| 1968 | SM-sarja | 22 | 10 | 1 | 11 | 161 | 207 | 21 | 6. | | | | | | | | |
| 1969 | SM-sarja | 22 | 10 | 1 | 11 | 164 | 172 | 21 | 8. | | | | | | | | |
| 1970 | SM-sarja | 22 | 11 | 2 | 9 | 216 | 202 | 24 | 7. | | | | | | | | |
| 1971 | SM-sarja | 22 | 2 | 0 | 20 | 98 | 206 | 4 | 12. | | | | | | | | |
| 1972 | Suomensarja | 18 | 12 | 1 | 5 | 204 | 117 | 25 | 2. | | | | | | | | |
| 1973 | Suomensarja | 18 | 16 | 1 | 1 | 185 | 55 | 33 | 2. | | | | | | | | |
| 1974 | Suomensarja | 18 | 15 | 0 | 3 | 231 | 102 | 30 | 1. | | | | | | | | |
| 1975 | SM-sarja | 22 | 6 | 2 | 14 | 115 | 184 | 14 | 10. | | | | | | | | |
| 1976 | Suomensarja | 18 | 16 | 1 | 1 | 184 | 65 | 33 | 1. | | | | | | | | |
| 1977 | SM-sarja | 22 | 9 | 1 | 12 | 110 | 131 | 19 | 9. | | | | | | | | |
| 1978 | SM-sarja | 22 | 5 | 1 | 16 | 114 | 199 | 11 | 11. | | | | | | | | |
| 1979 | Suomensarja | 18 | 12 | 1 | 5 | 176 | 108 | 25 | 3. | | | | | | | | |
| 1980 | Suomensarja | 18 | 11 | 0 | 7 | 161 | 137 | 22 | 4. | | | | | | | | |
| 1981 | Ykkössarja | 10 | 7 | 0 | 3 | 69 | 65 | 14 | 3. | 10 | 5 | 1 | 4 | 82 | 81 | 11 | 4. |
| 1982 | Ykkössarja | 10 | 6 | 0 | 4 | 71 | 61 | 12 | 3. | 10 | 1 | 1 | 8 | 52 | 91 | 3 | 6. |
| 1983 | Ykkössarja | 10 | 6 | 0 | 4 | 81 | 62 | 12 | 2. | 10 | 3 | 0 | 7 | 53 | 75 | 7 | 5. |
| 1984 | Ykkössarja | 10 | 5 | 1 | 4 | 78 | 50 | 11 | 3. | 10 | 4 | 2 | 4 | 67 | 65 | 10 | 4. |
| 1984 | Promotion/relegation playoff | | | | | | | | | Muhoksen Pallo-Salamat – Jymy 3–8 | | | | | | | |
| 1985 | SM-sarja | 22 | 5 | 1 | 16 | 85 | 152 | 11 | 12. | | | | | | | | |
| 1986 | Ykkössarja | 22 | 14 | 2 | 6 | 156 | 94 | 30 | 3. | 3 | 2 | 0 | 1 | 17 | 11 | 5 | 3. |
| 1987 | SM-sarja | 22 | 7 | 1 | 14 | 92 | 175 | 15 | 10. | 6 | 1 | 1 | 4 | 28 | 40 | 5 | 4. |
| 1988 | Ykkössarja | 22 | 15 | 0 | 7 | 193 | 128 | 30 | 4. | | | | | | | | |
| 1989 | Ykkössarja | 22 | 12 | 1 | 9 | 175 | 145 | 25 | 5. | | | | | | | | |
| 1990 | Ykkössarja | 22 | 6 | 3 | 13 | 141 | 159 | 15 | 11. | | | | | | | | |
| 1991 | Suomensarja | 22 | 20 | 1 | 1 | 282 | 132 | 41 | 1. | | | | | | | | |
| 1992 | Ykköspesis | 26 | 12 | 1 | 13 | 155 | 193 | 25 | 9. | | | | | | | | |
| 1993 | Ykköspesis | 26 | 12 | 0 | 14 | 188 | 190 | 24 | 10. | 2 | 2 | 0 | 0 | 31 | 27 | 2 | 10. |

| Regular season | | | | | | | | | | | Playoffs | | | | | | | | |
| Kausi | Sarja | M | 3p | 2p | 1p | 0p | Runs | RC | Pts. | Place | M | 3p | 2p | 1p | 0p | Runs | RC | Pts. | Place |
| 1994 | Ykköspesis | 14 | 6 | 1 | 3 | 4 | 78 | 66 | 23 | 7. | 14 | 4 | 2 | 5 | 3 | 111 | 101 | 28 | 8. |
| 1995 | Ykköspesis | 24 | 6 | 5 | 3 | 10 | 150 | 181 | 31 | 9. | | | | | | | | | |
| 1996 | Ykköspesis | 26 | 9 | 4 | 3 | 10 | 147 | 132 | 38 | 9. | | | | | | | | | |
| 1997 | Ykköspesis | 26 | 0 | 4 | 4 | 18 | 113 | 309 | 12 | 14. | | | | | | | | | |
| 1998 | Suomensarja | 22 | 8 | 6 | 3 | 5 | 160 | 153 | 39 | 4. | 4 | 0 | 2 | 0 | 3 | 15 | 28 | 4 | 2. |
| 1999 | Suomensarja | 18 | 9 | 4 | 4 | 1 | 216 | 131 | 39 | 1. | 2 | 0 | 2 | 0 | 0 | 10 | 8 | 4 | 2. |
| 2000 | Ykköspesis | 26 | 9 | 4 | 5 | 8 | 170 | 219 | 40 | 6. | Did not qualify | | | | | | | | |
| 2001 | Ykköspesis | 26 | 5 | 8 | 4 | 9 | 166 | 170 | 35 | 7. | Did not qualify | | | | | | | | |
| 2002 | Ykköspesis | 22 | 14 | 5 | 2 | 1 | 306 | 118 | 54 | 1. | 7 | 0 | 2 | 0 | 5 | 40 | 54 | 4 | 6. |
| 2003 | Ykköspesis | 22 | 10 | 7 | 4 | 1 | 238 | 127 | 48 | 1. | 7 | 1 | 3 | 1 | 2 | 68 | 64 | 10 | 4. |
| 2004 | Superpesis | 28 | 8 | 6 | 7 | 7 | 196 | 178 | 42 | 5. | 7 | 1 | 4 | 1 | 1 | 48 | 49 | 13 | 5. |
| 2005 | Superpesis | 25 | 10 | 6 | 2 | 7 | 166 | 108 | 44 | 3. | 7 | 2 | 0 | 2 | 3 | 36 | 38 | 11 | 4. |
| 2006 | Superpesis | 27 | 5 | 9 | 5 | 8 | 212 | 165 | 38 | 5. | 7 | 3 | 1 | 0 | 3 | 46 | 36 | 11 | 5. |
| 2007 | Superpesis | 26 | 11 | 9 | 2 | 4 | 187 | 120 | 53 | 2. | 7 | 2 | 4 | 1 | 0 | 53 | 37 | 19 | 2. |
| 2008 | Superpesis | 24 | 6 | 8 | 3 | 7 | 153 | 118 | 37 | 5. | 7 | 1 | 3 | 2 | 1 | 37 | 44 | 12 | 4. |
| 2009 | Superpesis | 24 | 1 | 5 | 6 | 12 | 104 | 162 | 19 | 10. | 3 | 1 | 2 | 0 | 0 | 23 | 10 | 7 | 10. |
| 2010 | Superpesis | 26 | 4 | 4 | 5 | 13 | 173 | 226 | 25 | 10. | 4 | 1 | 2 | 0 | 1 | 47 | 29 | 7 | 10. |
| 2011 | Superpesis | 26 | 5 | 3 | 2 | 16 | 132 | 250 | 23 | 9. | Did not qualify | | | | | | | | |
| 2012 | Superpesis | 26 | 3 | 2 | 7 | 14 | 103 | 179 | 20 | 11. | 4 | 0 | 1 | 0 | 3 | 18 | 34 | 2 | 11. |
| 2012 | Promotion/relegation playoff: Jymy – SMJ | | | | | | | | | | 4 | 2 | 1 | 1 | 0 | 23 | 10 | 9 | 1. |

==== Notes ====
- The placements for 1933 through 1935 are for Jymy's conference, and not for the entire B-sarja league.

| | 1. Highest league |
| | 2. Second highest league |
| | 3. Third highest league |
| | 4. Fourth highest league |
| M | Matches |
| W | Wins |
| T | Ties |
| L | Losses |
| 3p | Three-point win (2-0 or 1–0 in periods) |
| 2p | Two-point win (Winning in extra innings) |
| 1p | One-point loss (Losing in extra innings) |
| 0p | Defeat (0–2 or 0–1 in periods) |
| RC | Runs conceded by the defence |
| Pts. | Points |
