= Nuijamaa Church =

Church in Lappeenranta, Finland

Coordinates: 60°57′34″N 028°32′16″E

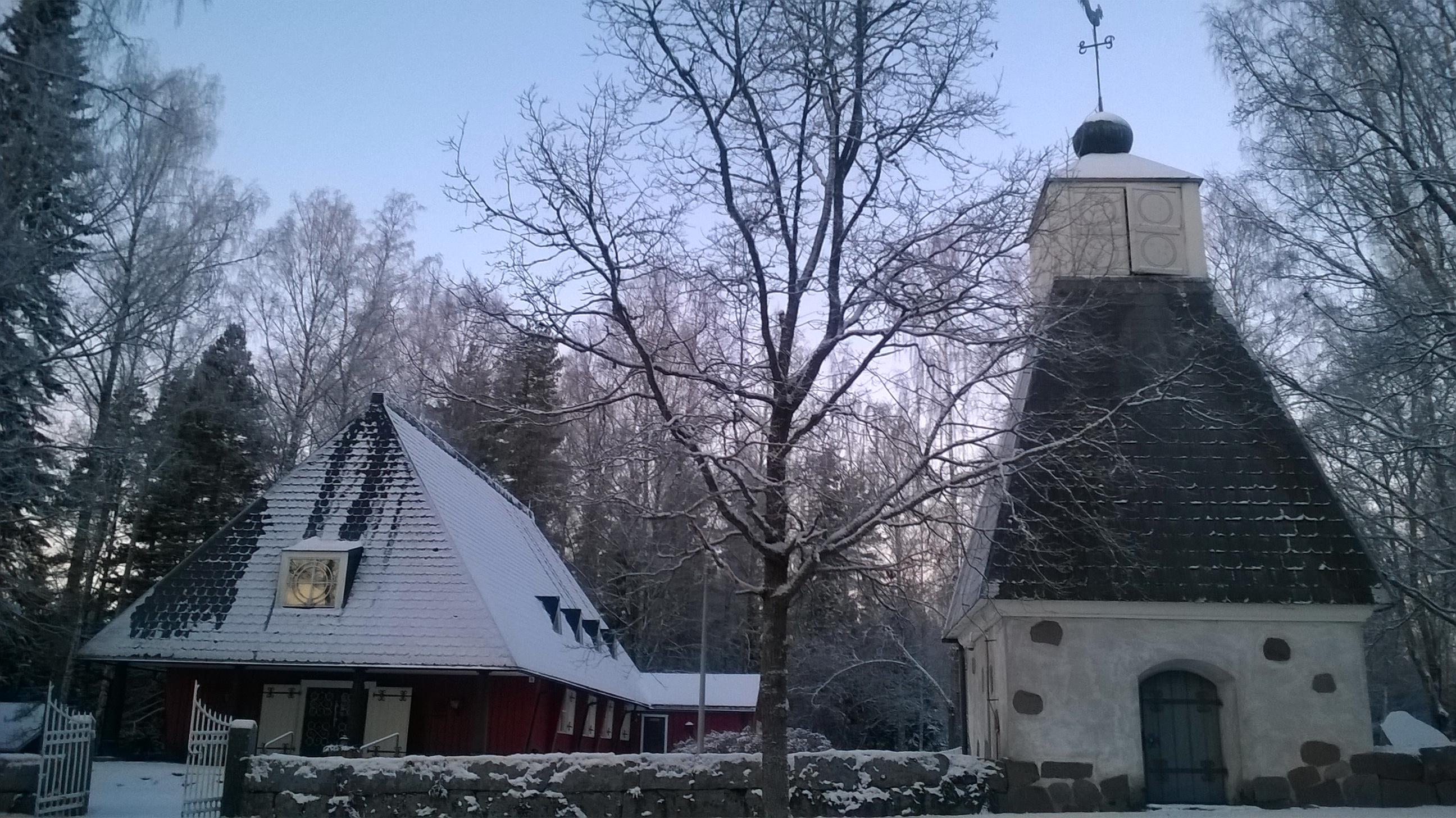
Nuijamaa Church

Nuijamaa Church (Finnish: Nuijamaan kirkko) is an Evangelical Lutheran church in the Nuijamaa district of Lappeenranta, Finland. The church was opened in December 1948. The national romantic wooden design was created by the architect couple Tarja Salmio-Toiviainen and Esko Toiviainen. The church is located only a couple of hundred meters from the Finnish–Russian border.

The church is listed as a nationally significant built heritage site by the Finnish National Board of Antiquities.

== See also ==
- Lauritsala Church
- St. Mary's Church of Lappee
