= Seinäjoen JymyJussit =

Finnish pesäpallo team

Information
- League: Superpesis
- Location: Seinäjoki, Finland
- Ballpark: Seinäjoki Pesäpallo Stadium
- Founded: 2012
- League championships: 0 (none)
- Colors: Black, silver, white
- Ownership: JymyJussit Oy
- General manager: Ossi Viljanen
- Website: jymyjussit.fi

Seinäjoen JymyJussit (Finnish for "Jymy and Jussit from Seinäjoki", sometimes referred to as Seinäjoki) is a Finnish professional pesäpallo team based in Seinäjoki and playing in the top-tier Finnish Superpesis. Seinäjoen JymyJussit has participated in Superpesis since 2012. The club is owned by two traditional pesäpalloteams from Seinäjoki; Nurmon Jymy and Seinäjoen Maila-Jussit. The name "JymyJussit" is the combination of these two owner clubs.

Seinäjoen JymyJussit's home ground is the Seinäjoki Pesäpallo Stadium. The seating capacity of the ballpark is 4,500. The ballpark locates at the city center of Seinäjoki.
