= Eino Valle =

Finnish long-distance runner

Personal information
- Nationality: Finnish
- Born: 18 February 1932 Ruokolahti, Finland
- Died: 21 June 1990 (aged 58) Lauritsala, Finland

Sport
- Sport: Long-distance running
- Event: Marathon

Eino Valle (18 February 1932 – 21 June 1990) was a Finnish long-distance runner. He competed in the marathon at the 1964 Summer Olympics.
