= Joutseno Church =

Church in Joutseno, Finland

Coordinates: 61°07′04″N 028°30′29″E

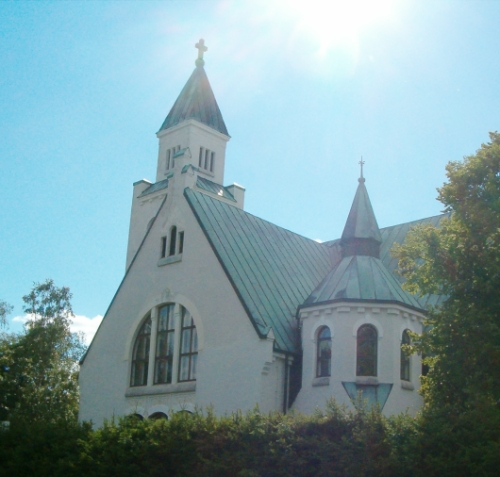
Joutseno Church in July 2007

Joutseno Church (Finnish: Joutsenon kirkko) is a church designed by Josef Stenbäck located in Joutseno, Lappeenranta, Finland. The church was built in 1921.
