= Arvi Lind =

Finnish television news presenter (1940–2026)

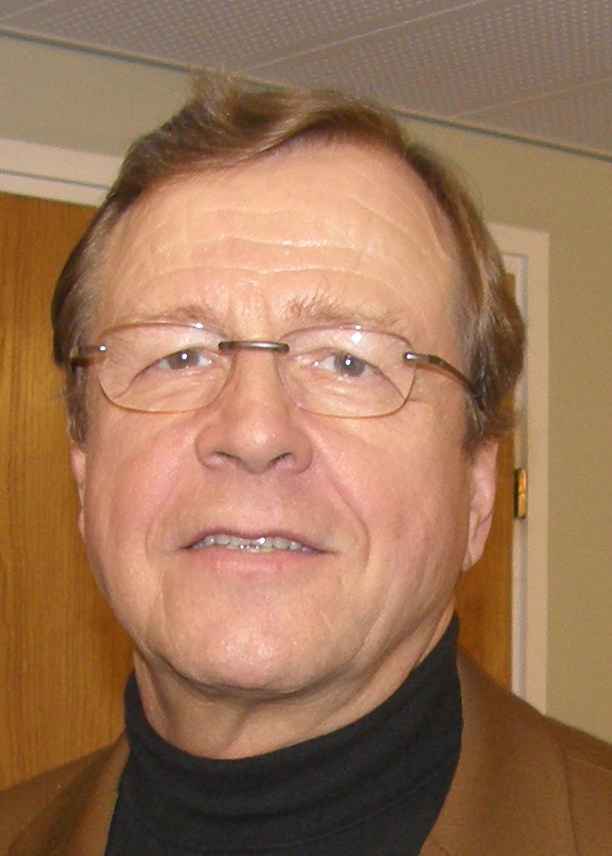
Lind in 2008

Arvi Kullervo Lind (21 December 1940 – 7 June 2026) was a Finnish television news presenter. He worked as the news anchor on Yleisradio TV1 from 1965 to 2003. Along with Kari Toivonen, he was one of the longest-serving employees of Yleisradio news.

== Life and career ==
Lind was born in Lauritsala on 21 December 1940. His career as a reporter in Yleisradio TV news began on 15 October 1965. His last news broadcast was on Wednesday, 15 October 2003, at 20:30 EEST, and he retired from his work at the beginning of year 2004. The farewell broadcast was seen by over 1.6 million viewers. Since then, he lectured about his work in universities, and in 2005, the newspaper Keskisuomalainen appointed him as their reader ombudsman. He was often called "the most trustworthy man in Finland" by the media.

The biography Lindin Arvi was written by Heikki Hietamies.

Lind was also a sports hobbyist, and played ice hockey in a team called Zoom. His son Juha Lind has played in national and NHL level.

In Suuret suomalaiset, Lind ranked 85th.

Lind died on 7 June 2026 in Helsinki, at the age of 85.
