= Tarja Salmio-Toiviainen =

Finnish architect (1917-2001)

- Born: 7 July 1917; Helsinki
- Died: 15 January 2001 (aged 83); Helsinki
- Education: Helsingin yhteislyseo
- Occupation: Architect
- Buildings: Nuijamaa Church

Tarja Inkeri Salmio-Toiviainen (7 July 1917 – 15 January 2001) was a Finnish architect.

== Career ==
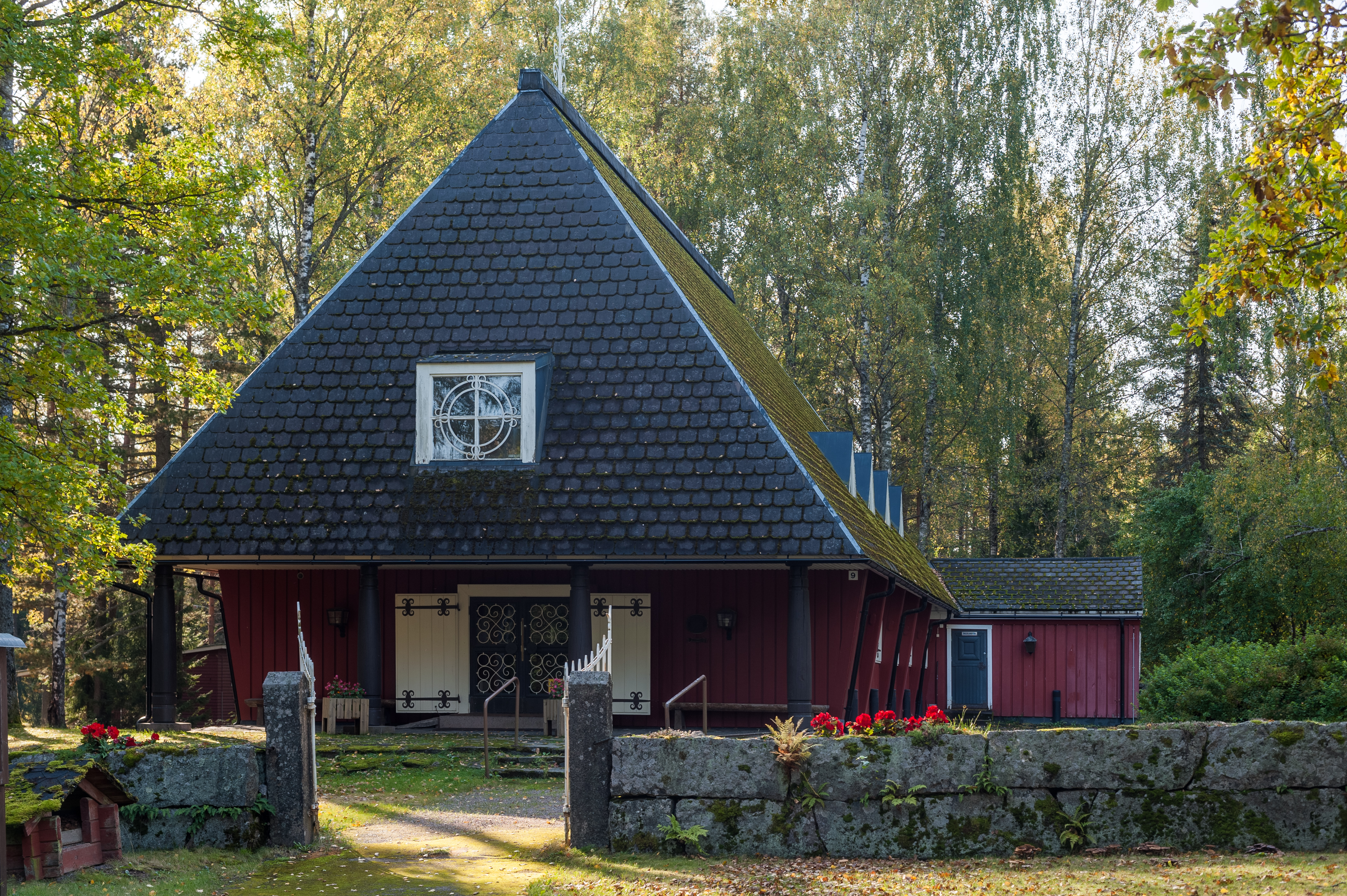
Nuijamaa Church

Salmio-Toiviainen graduated as an architect in 1941. She founded her own architectural office in 1947 with her spouse Esko Toiviainen. The pair designed the Nuijamaa church, Nummela, Järvenpää, Puotila and Vihtijärvi chapels, as well as Luhta Oy's office building, factories and residential area in Lahti, as well as war cemeteries. Several companies used them in design work. According to the Museum of Finnish Architecture, the pair's perhaps most famous work is the Rantapolku semi-detached house (1953) designed together with architect Einari Teräsvirta in Munkkiniemi, Helsinki, which is protected in the town plan. Salmio-Toiviainen's drawing collection is in the Museum of Finnish Architecture.
