= Lauritsala =

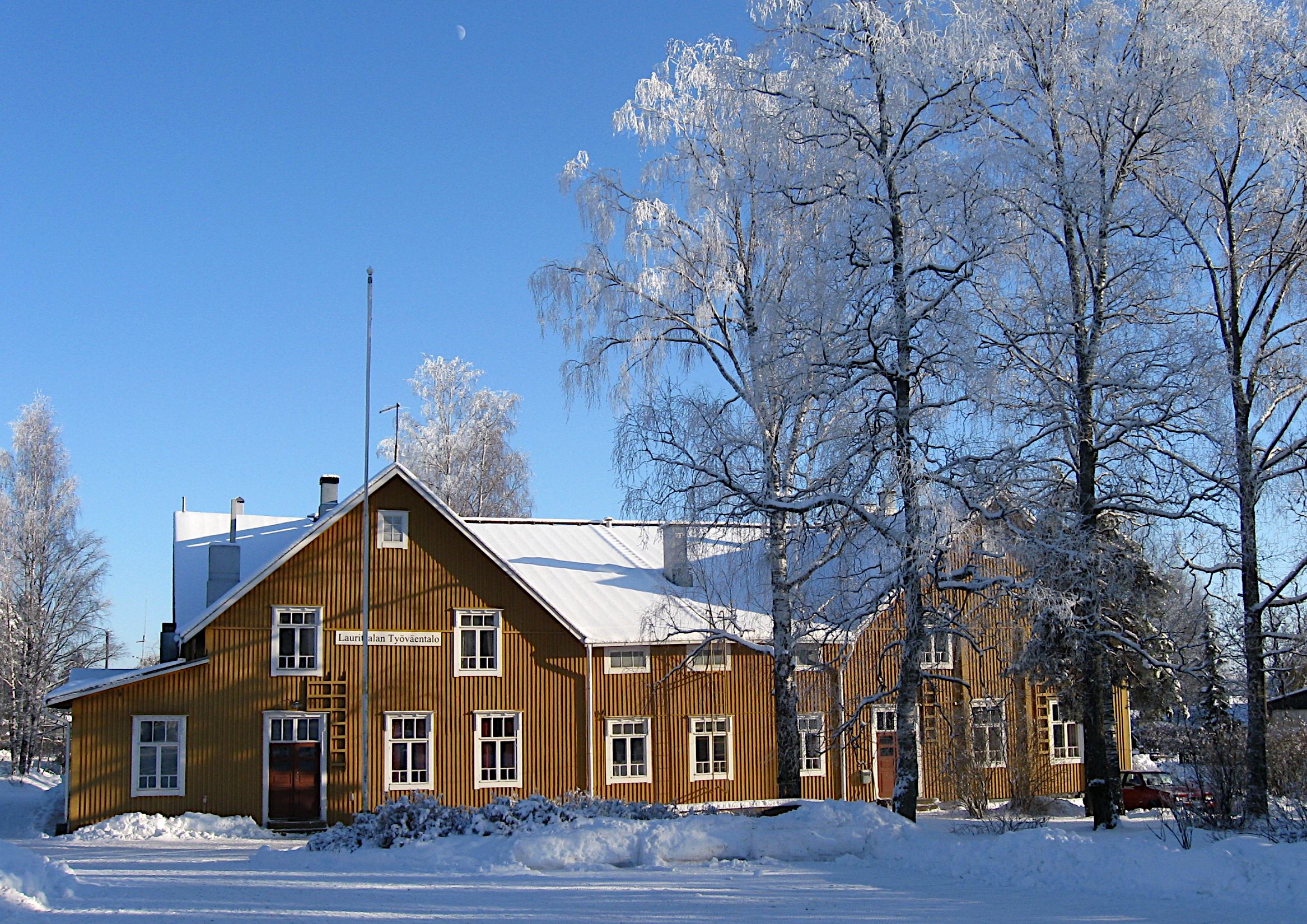
- Lauritsala People's House

- Coat of arms

- Location of Lauritsala in Finland
- Coordinates: 61°04′15″N 028°15′35″E
- Country: Finland
- Region: South Karelia
- Municipality: Lappeenranta
- Established: 1932
- Incorporated: 1967

Area
  - Total: 24.7 km^{2} (9.5 sq mi)

Population (31.12.1966)
  - Total: 12,965
  - Density: 494.57/km^{2} (1,280.9/sq mi)
- Municipality code: 411
- Climate: Dfc
- Website: www.lauritsala.fi

Lauritsala (Finnish pronunciation: [ˈlɑu̯ritsɑlɑ]) is a former Finnish market town in the South Karelia region. It was closed down on 1 January 1967 and was incorporated into Lappeenranta. The present district of Lauritsala comprises only the center of the former town.

== History ==
Lauritsala was originally one of the villages of the Lappee parish. It has existed at least since 1558, when it was mentioned as Lawritzala. Its name is derived from the surname Lauritsainen, which in turn is derived from the name of Saint Lawrence. Lauritsala became an independent municipality in 1932.

The former Lauritsala market area had 12,965 inhabitants in 1966. It is home to UPM-Kymmene's Kaukas mills and part of the Saimaa Canal.

The center of Lappeenranta is about four kilometres away. There are old detached houses and blocks of flats in the area, with new settlements. In 1960, Lauritsala's population density included Mustola (341 inhabitants, partly on the Lappee side) and Mälki (322 inhabitants).

The Lappeenranta and Lauritsala population centres had grown together and are now called Lappeenranta centre, with 32,174 inhabitants in 1960. In addition, part of the Laihia settlement in Lappee municipality extended to Lauritsala.

== Notable people ==
- Seppo Ahokainen, Finnish professional ice hockey player
- Teuvo Kohonen, Finnish researcher, best known for the development of self-organizing map
- Arvi Lind, Finnish television news presenter
- Eino Valle, Finnish long-distance runner

== Places and events ==
- Lauritsala Church
- Lauritsala's library was described by L. R. McColvin (City Librarian at Westminster, London) as: "the most attractive, most beautiful small library I have ever seen in the world."

== Gallery ==
Images of Lauritsala
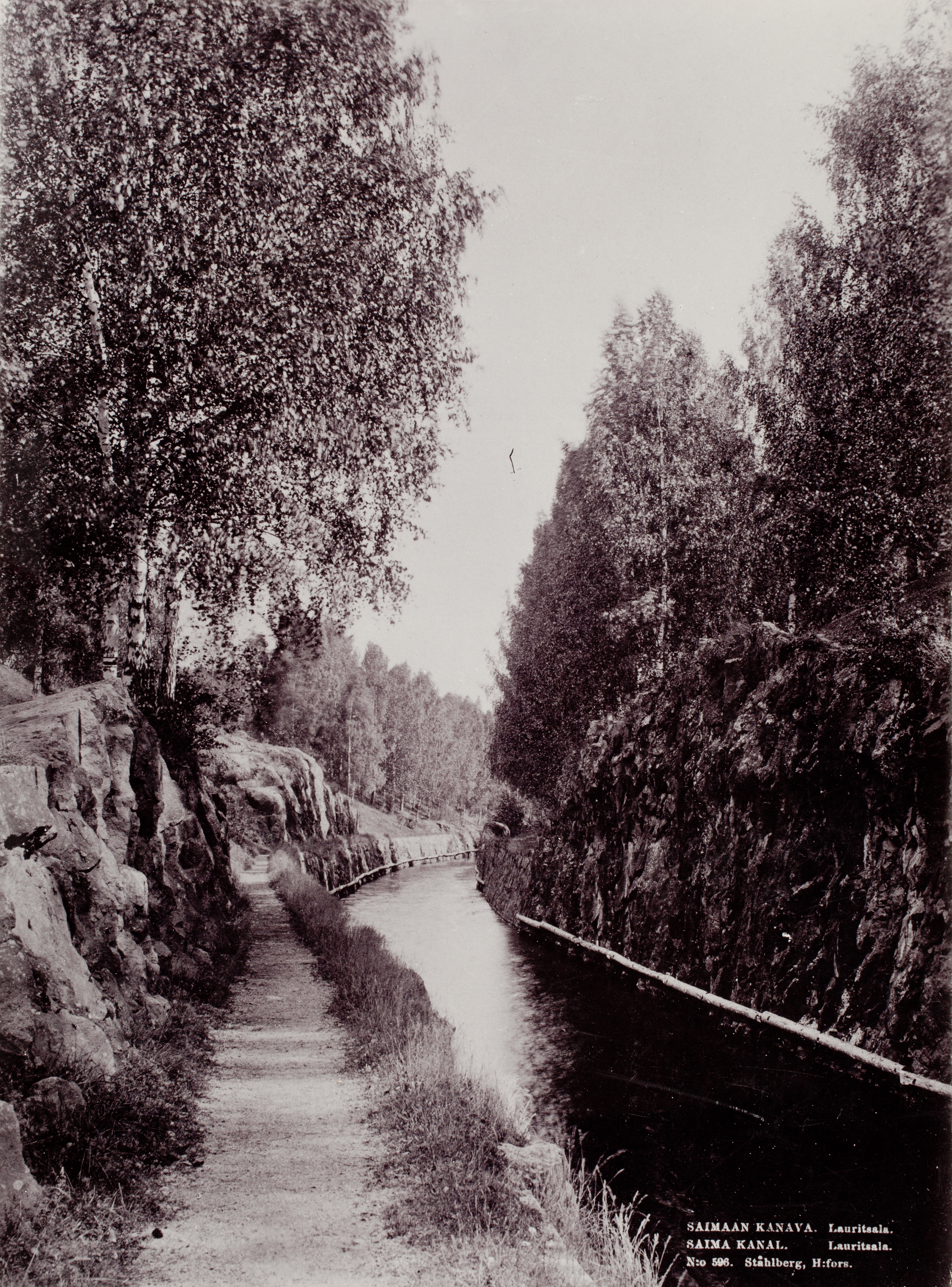
Saimaa canal in Lauritsala (2012)

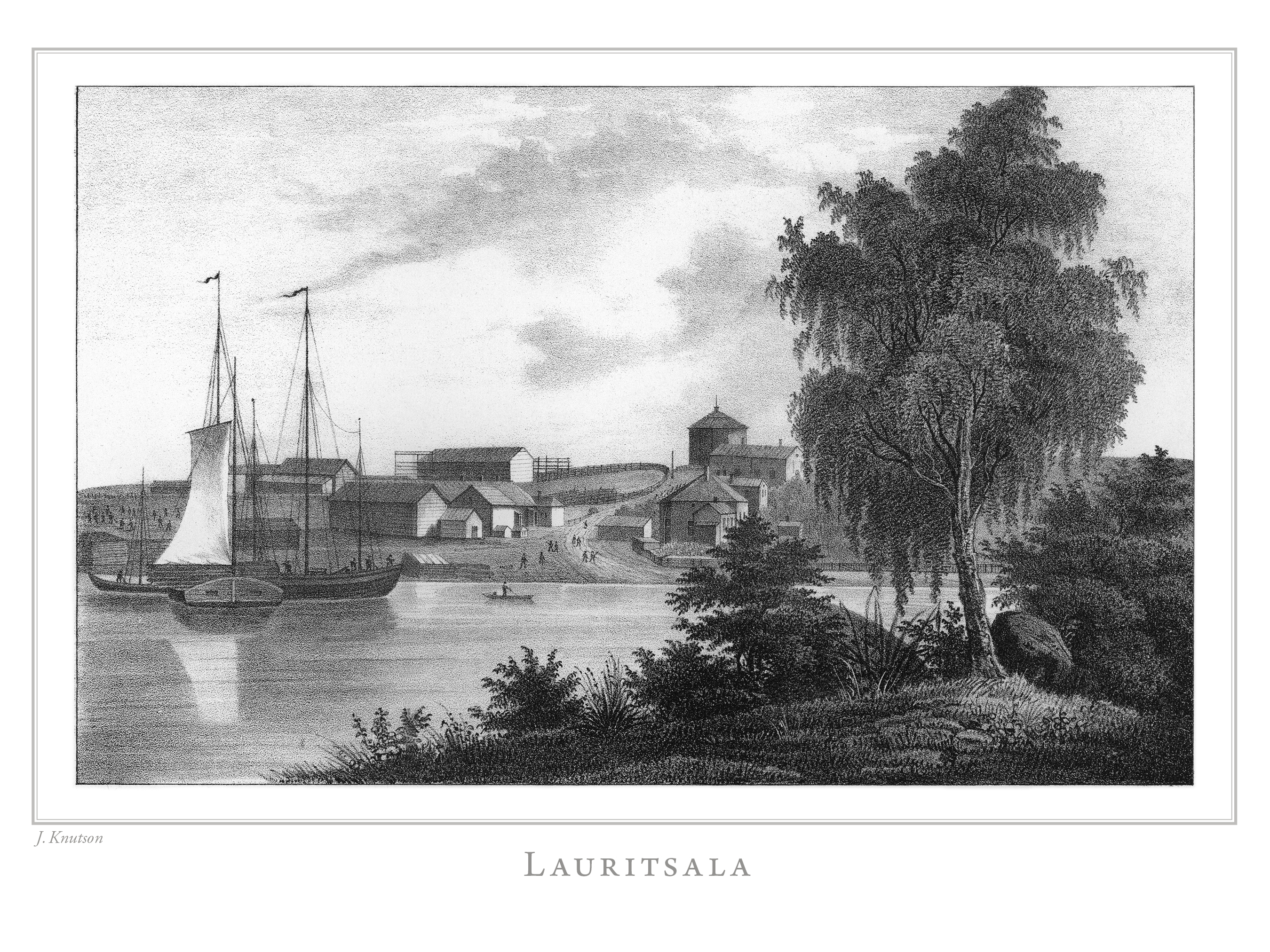
Illustration in Finland framstäldt i teckningar edited by Zacharias Topelius and published 1845-1852.
