= Seinäjoen Maila-Jussit =

Finnish sports club

Information
- League: Superpesis
- Location: Seinäjoki, Finland
- Ballpark: Seinäjoki Pesäpallo Stadium
- Founded: 1932
- League championships: Men: (4) 1975, 1983, 1985, 1987; Men (Cup): (2) 1973, 1974; Women: (1) 1977
- Colors: red, white
- Ownership: Seinäjoen Maila-Jussit ry
- Manager: Juha Antikainen
- Website: www.smj.fi

Current uniforms
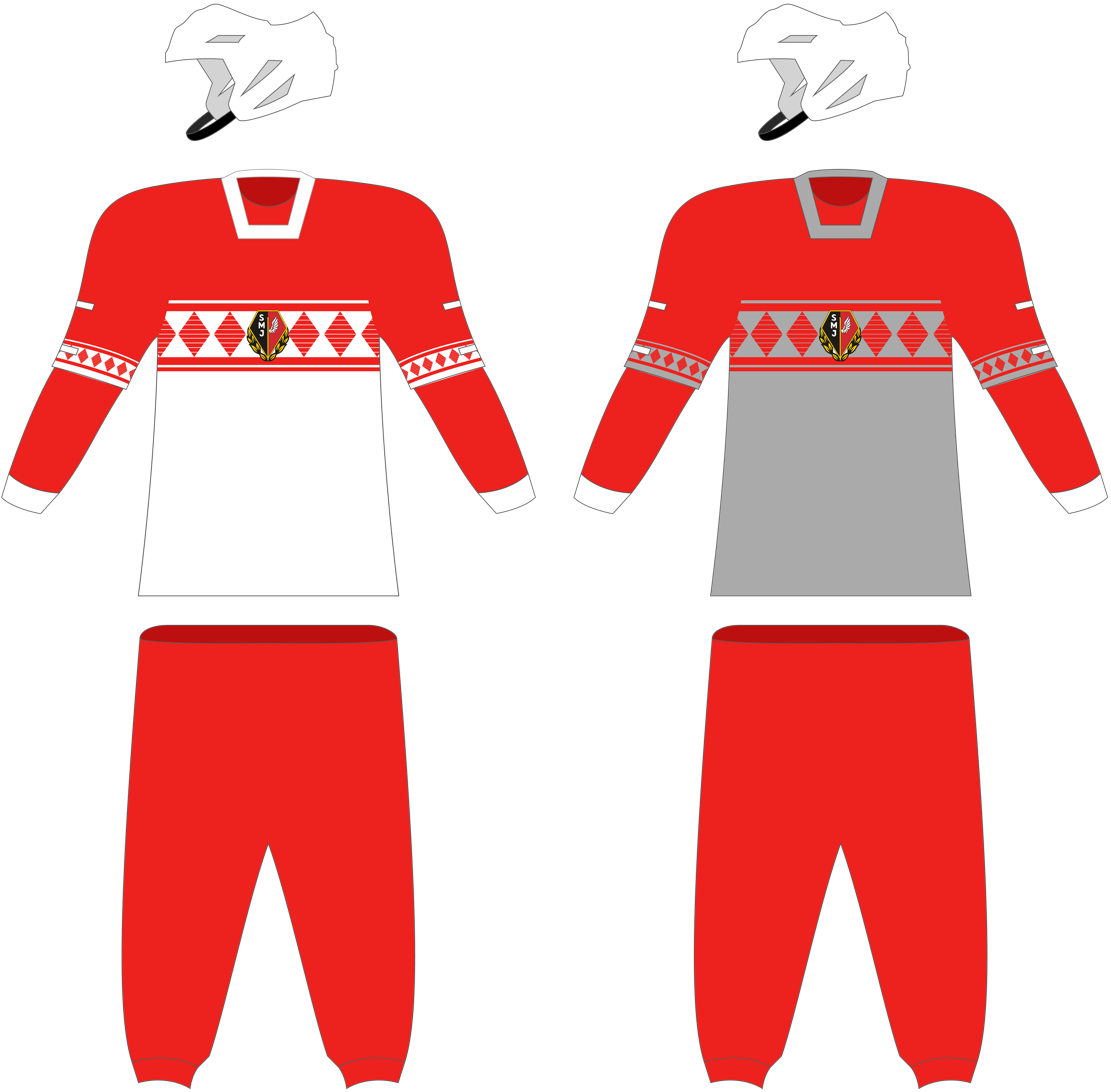

Seinäjoen Maila-Jussit is a professional Finnish baseball (pesäpallo) team from Seinäjoki. It was founded in 1932. Seinäjoen Maila-Jussit is playing in the top-tier women's Superpesis.

Seinäjoen Maila-Jussit has won the men's Finnish Pesäpallo Championship (Superpesis) four times in the years 1975, 1983, 1985 and 1987 and the women's Championship in 1977. The home ground of Seinäjoen Maila-Jussit is the Seinäjoki Pesäpallo Stadium.

== History ==
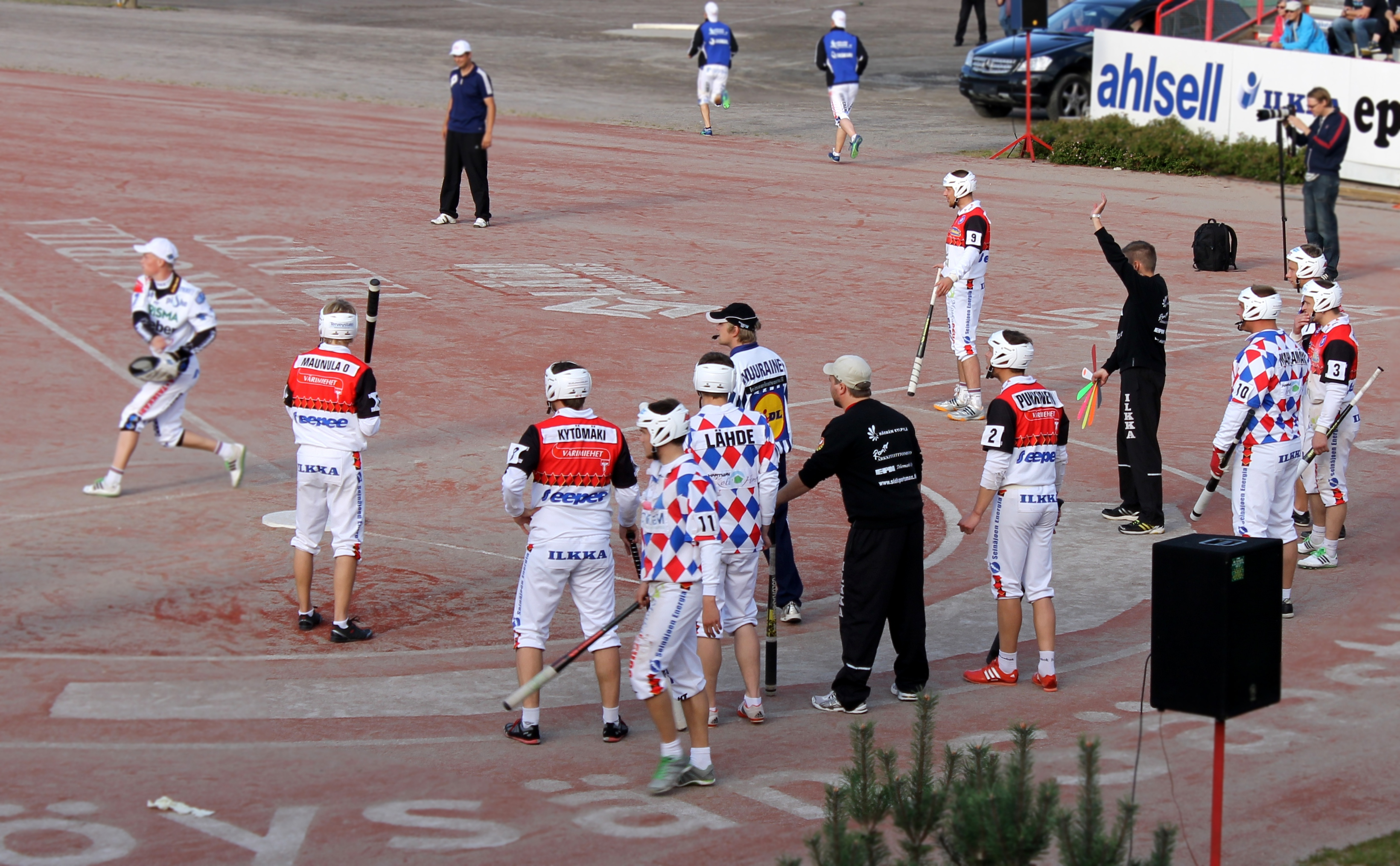
Seinäjoen Maila-Jussit in 2012.

Seinäjoen Maila-Jussit was founded in 1932. The club visited the Championship league three times in the 1940s and 1950s. The club consolidated its place in the main league in 1969 and played in the top flight continuously until 2005.

In 1969, the SMJ won the first medal in its history, the silver medal in the Championship league. Seinäjoki Maila-Jussit took Vimpelin Veto's place as the number one club in South Ostrobothnia in the 1970s. The club's golden age was particularly in the 1980s and the club remained successful until the early 2000s. Between 1974 and 1989, the club won 11 medals - four gold, four silver and three bronze. It dominated the late 70s and 80s together with Jyväskylän Kiri and Hyvinkään Tahko.

During the same period, the club's women's team won five medals - one championship, three silver and one bronze. SMJ also won the Finnish volleyball championship in 1986 and 1987. In the 1990s, the club won four bronze medals. The club's last medal came in 2004. A year later, the club was relegated to the Ykköspesis.

The club was immediately promoted back to the main league. In 2008, however, the club relinquished its main league place and in 2012 the club's men's team merged with Nurmon Jymy to form Seinäjoen JymyJussit. Both clubs were left with their own junior organisations and the club's women's team continued to operate under the SMJ name.

== Seinäjoki Pesäpallo Stadium ==
Seinäjoki Pesäpallo Stadium
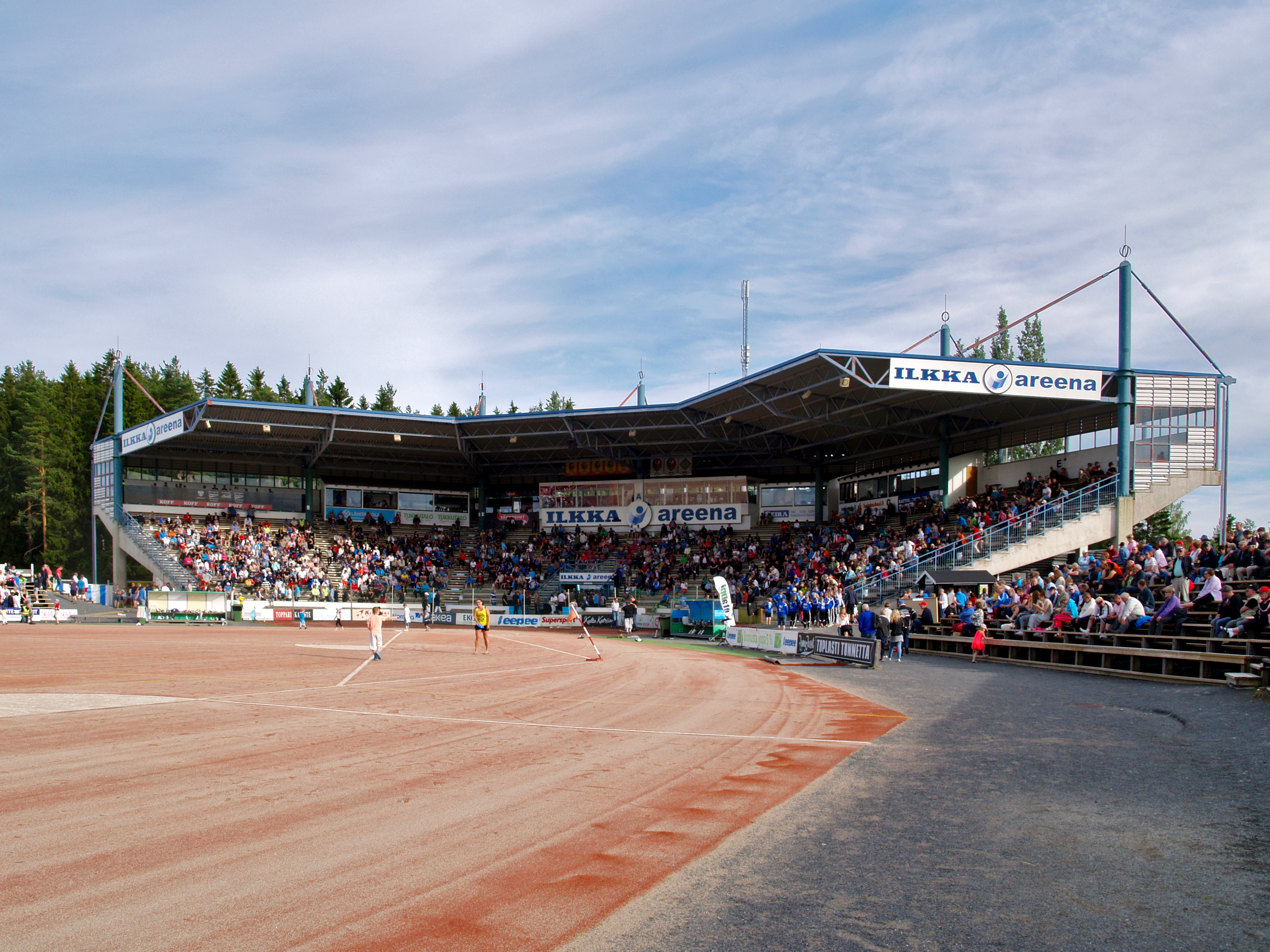
- Seinäjoki Pesäpallo Stadium in 2015.

- Location within South Ostrobothnia Location within Finland Location within Europe
- Address: Urheilupuisto; 60100 Seinäjoki; Finland
- Location: Seinäjoki, Finland
- Coordinates: 62.781856°N 22.853508°E
- Owner: City of Seinäjoki
- Capacity: 4,500
- Surface: Clay; Artificial grass (Deep field)
- Record attendance: 6,130; 1997 (Seinäjoen Maila-Jussit vs. Sotkamon Jymy)
- Field size: Left field: 175 m (574 ft); Centre field: 168 m (551 ft); Right field: 184 m (604 ft)
- Public transit: Ruukintie 42, Härmän liikenne Route 6 Seinäjoki station

Construction
- Opened: 1992

Tenants
- Seinäjoen Maila-Jussit (1992–present); Seinäjoen JymyJussit (2012–present)

Seinäjoki Pesäpallo Stadium is a pesäpallo stadium located in Seinäjoki. Since its opening in 1992, it has been the home field of the Seinäjoen Maila-Jussit. It is also home of the Seinäjoen JymyJussit. The stadium is located in Seinäjoki Sports Park, next to the central sports field. The stadium was renovated in 2010. The area behind the backline is very flat. The deep field consists mostly of an artificial grass field with field hockey dimensions and markings.

=== Renovation ===
In 2022, renovation work began on the stadium's field, the first big upgrade for the previous 15 years. The field will be shifted 6–7 meters closer to the stands for the visitor better experience. The renovation project was estimated to cost 500,000 euros in 2022, with an additional 168,000 euros planned for 2023. The project has also received 100,000 euros in sports venue investment funding from the Regional State Administrative Agency.

== Achievements ==
Men's Pesäpallo
Superpesis

Type	Trophy	Titles	Seasons
Finnish championship	Winners	4	1975, 1983, 1985, 1987
Finnish championship	Second place	5	1969, 1974, 1976, 1982, 1988
Finnish championship	Third place	8	1979, 1980, 1981, 1991, 1995, 1996, 1997, 2004

Women's Pesäpallo
Superpesis

Type	Trophy	Titles	Seasons
Finnish championship	Winners	1	1977
Finnish championship	Second place	3	1976, 1978, 1979
Finnish championship	Third place	1	1975
