= Josef Stenbäck =

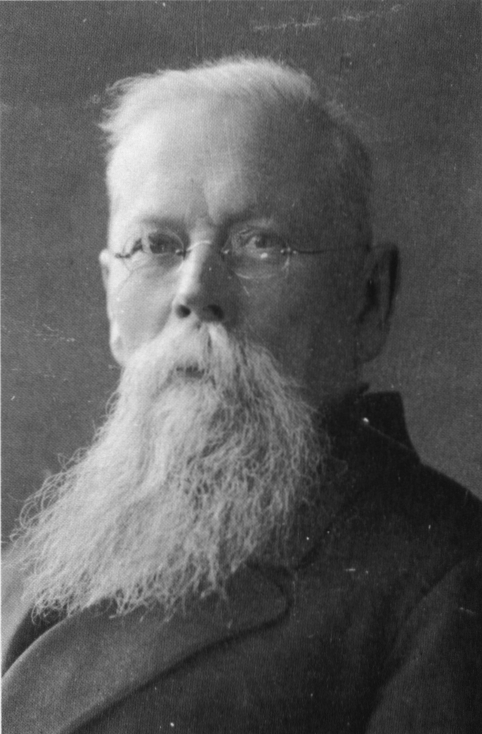
Josef Stenbäck at old age

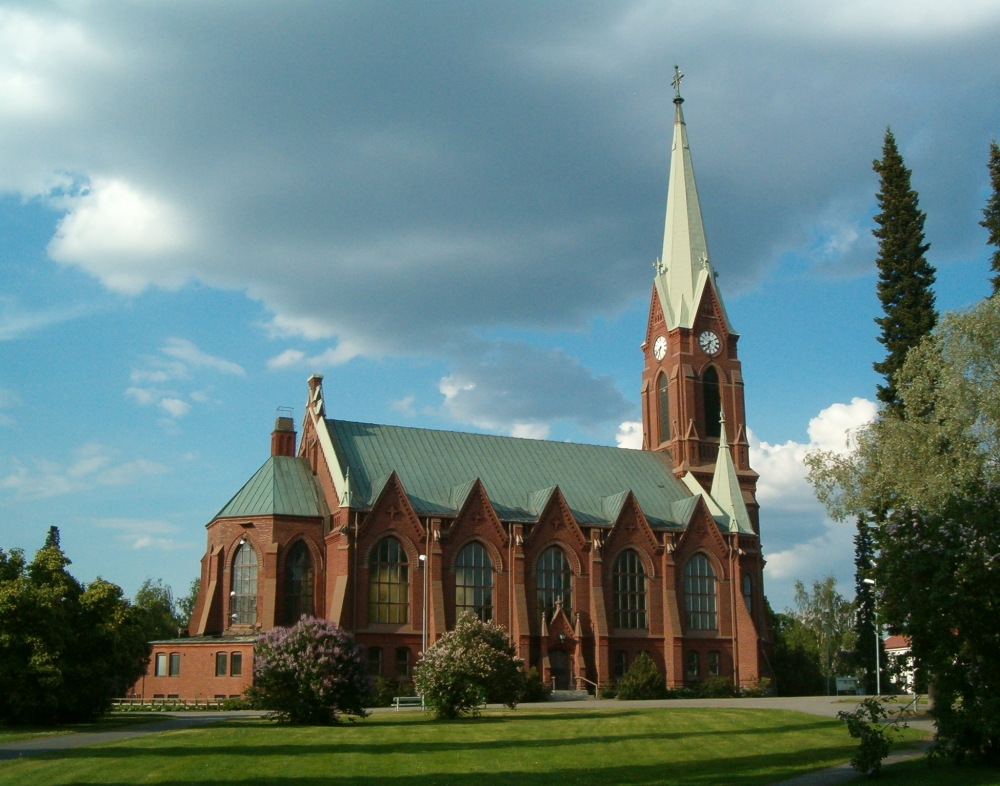
Mikkeli Cathedral, built 1896–1897, represents Gothic Revival architecture

Josef Daniel Stenbäck (May 2, 1854, Alavus — April 27, 1929, Helsinki) was a Finnish church architect and engineer. He designed 35 churches for Finland, which until 1917 was part of the Russian Empire. Four of the churches were located in the current Russian territory of the Karelian Isthmus, ceded to the Soviet Union in 1944. Stenbäck's churches represent Romantic nationalism or Gothic Revival. One of his most famous works is the Juselius Mausoleum.

== Churches in Finland designed by Josef Stenbäck ==
- Wooden churches

- Heinävesi (1892)
- Luhanka (1883)
- Keikyä (1912)
- Pulkkila (1909)
- Killinkoski (1928)
- Hankasalmi (1882)

- Brick churches

- Forssa (1917)
- Kotka (1898)
- Vehmersalmi (1920)
- Joensuu (1903)
- Mikkeli (1897)
- Kauhava (1925)
- Rantasalmi (1904, burned 1984)

- Stone churches

- Alahärmä (1903)
- Hirvensalmi (1915)
- Koivisto (1904)
- Muuruvesi (1894)
- Raahe (1912)
- Terijoki (1908)
- Eura (1898)
- Joutseno (1921)
- Kuolemajärvi (1902, demolished in 1939)
- Nilsiä (1905)
- Räisälä (1913)
- Varpaisjärvi (1904)
- Hartola (1913)
- Karuna (1910)
- Luvia (1910)
- Pyhäranta (1909)
- Sonkajärvi (1910)
- Vuolijoki (1906)

- Roughcast churches

- Humppila (1922)
- Pattijoki (1912)
- Kemi (1902)
- Savitaipale (1924)
