= Mikkeli Cathedral =

St. Michael's Cathedral
- Mikkelin tuomiokirkko (in Finnish); S:t Michels domkyrka (in Swedish)
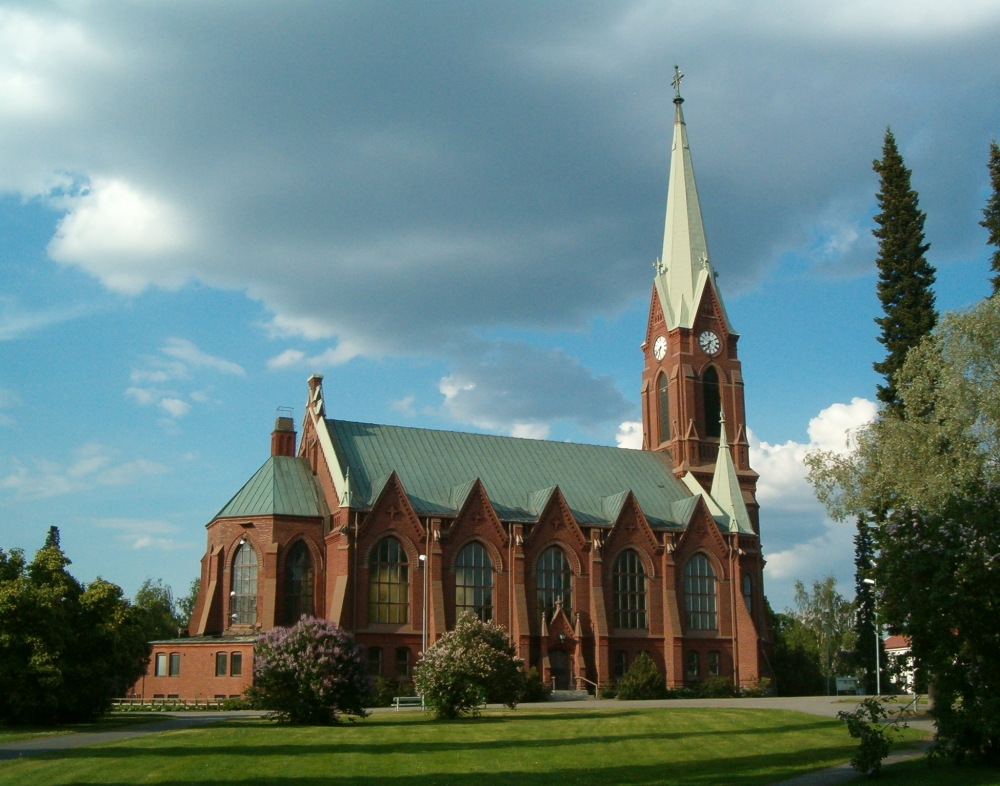
- St. Michael's Cathedral
- St. Michael's Cathedral
- 61°41′21.4″N 027°16′00.3″E
- Location: Mikkeli,
- Country: Finland
- Denomination: Evangelical Lutheran Church of Finland
- Website: www.mikkelintuomiokirkkoseurakunta.fi

History
- Status: Cathedral
- Dedication: St Michael

Architecture
- Architect: Josef Stenbäck
- Architectural type: Cathedral
- Style: Gothic Revival
- Completed: 1897

Specifications
- Capacity: seats 1,200

Administration
- Diocese: Mikkeli

Clergy
- Bishop: Seppo Häkkinen

Mikkeli Cathedral is a large church in Mikkeli, Southern Savonia, Finland, designed by Finnish church architect Josef Stenbäck. It was built in 1896–1897 and represents the Gothic Revival style like many other churches designed by Stenbäck. The bell tower is in the western gable of the church. The church has 1,200 seats.

The organ was built in 1956 by Kangasala Organ Factory and has 51 stops. The altar painting "Crucified" was made by Pekka Halonen in 1899.
