= Joensuu Church =

Church in Joensuu, Finland

Coordinates: 62°35′41″N 29°45′11″E

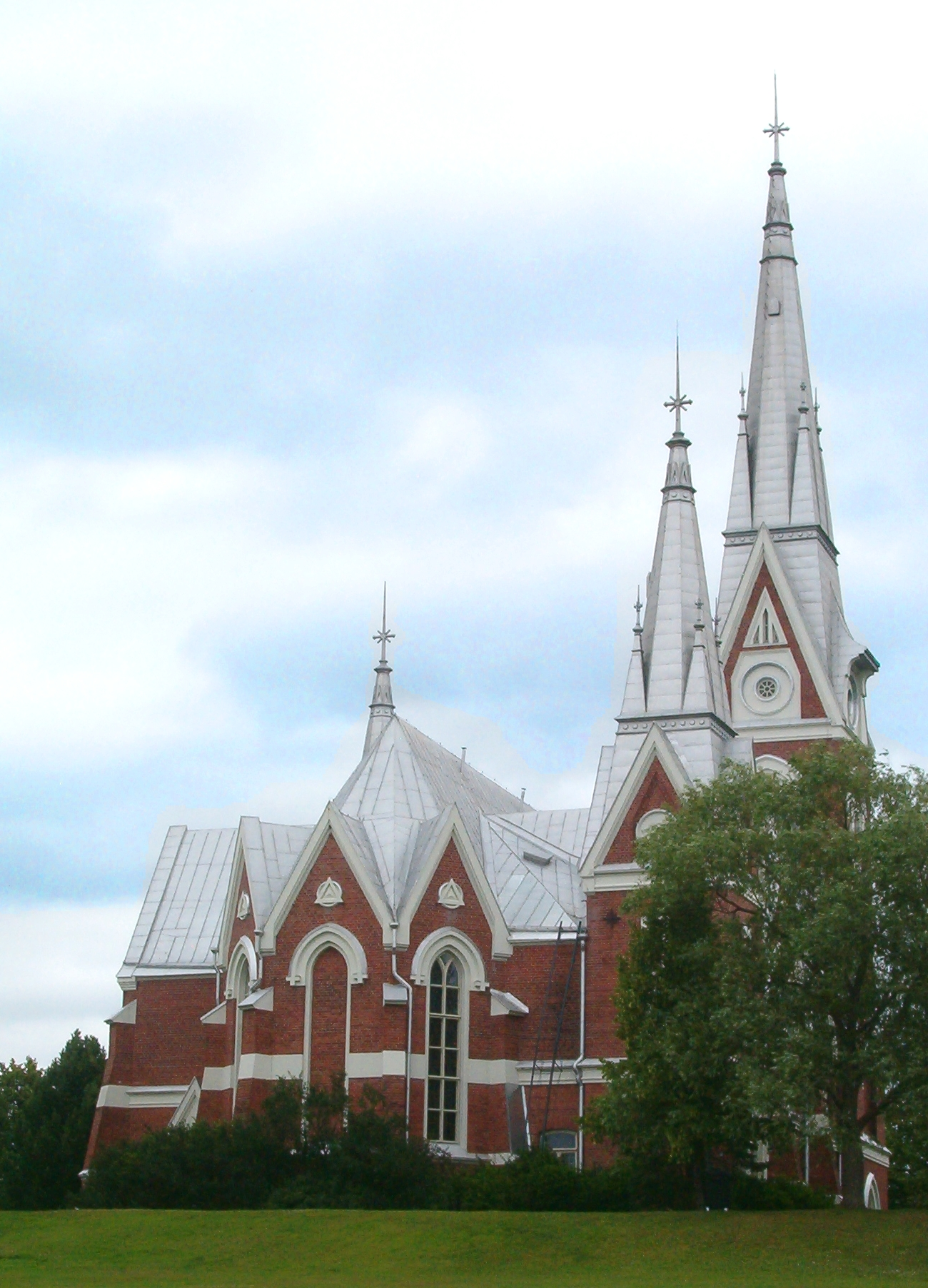
Joensuu Church from south

Joensuu Church is located in the centre of Joensuu, North Karelia, Finland. The church was built in 1903 and designed by a Finnish church architect Josef Stenbäck. Architecturally it represents the Gothic Revival style, but it also has some features of National Romantic style. The high tower located in the northeast corner is the bell tower and in the lower southwest tower is the organ, which was built in 1969 by Organ Factory of Kangasala and has 36 stops. The church has 1000 seats. The altar painting is called The Crucifixion of Jesus and it is painted by Ilmari Launis in 1910.

== Sources ==
- Katariina Melvas: Paratiisista pyhään lehtoon. Joensuun evankelis-luterilaisen kirkon kattomaalausten symboliikka. University of Jyväskylä, 2004. (in Finnish)
