= Kemi Church =

Kemi church
- Finnish: Kemin kirkko
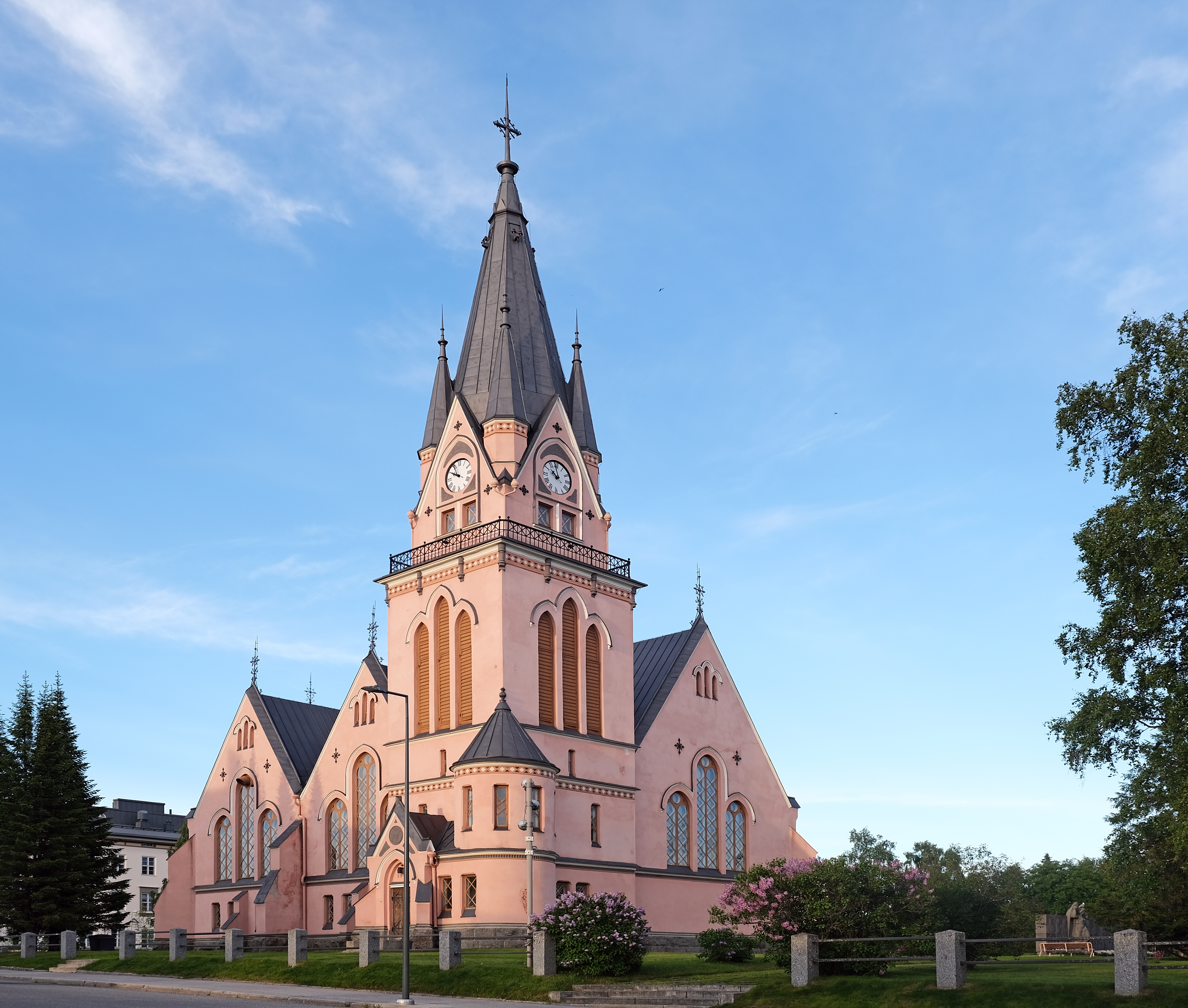
- Kemi church
- 65°43′56″N 024°33′47″E
- Location: Sauvosaari, Kemi
- Address: Kirkkopuistokatu 9, 94100 Kemi
- Country: Finland
- Denomination: Lutheran

History
- Consecrated: 8 March 1903

Architecture
- Architect: Josef Stenbäck
- Style: Gothic Revival
- Completed: 1902

Specifications
- Capacity: 1,200

Administration
- Diocese: Diocese of Oulu
- Parish: Kemi

Kemi Church is a Finnish Evangelical Lutheran church of the Diocese of Oulu. The church is located in the centre of the town of Kemi in Northern Finland.

The Gothic Revival building was designed by architect Josef Stenbäck and it was completed in 1902. It is a brick constructed long church with two side ships. The building resonates continental Neo-Gothic influence which is especially displayed on the magnificent round window overlooking the main entrance as well as on the great windows of the altar wall. The Gothic architecture influence is also shown on the steeple, smaller spires and gables.

The archways and protruding columns of the church hall resemble those of big European cathedrals. Simple furnishing and frugal decoration are in turn part of the traditional Finnish stone church building.

The building was renovated in 2003.

== Gallery ==
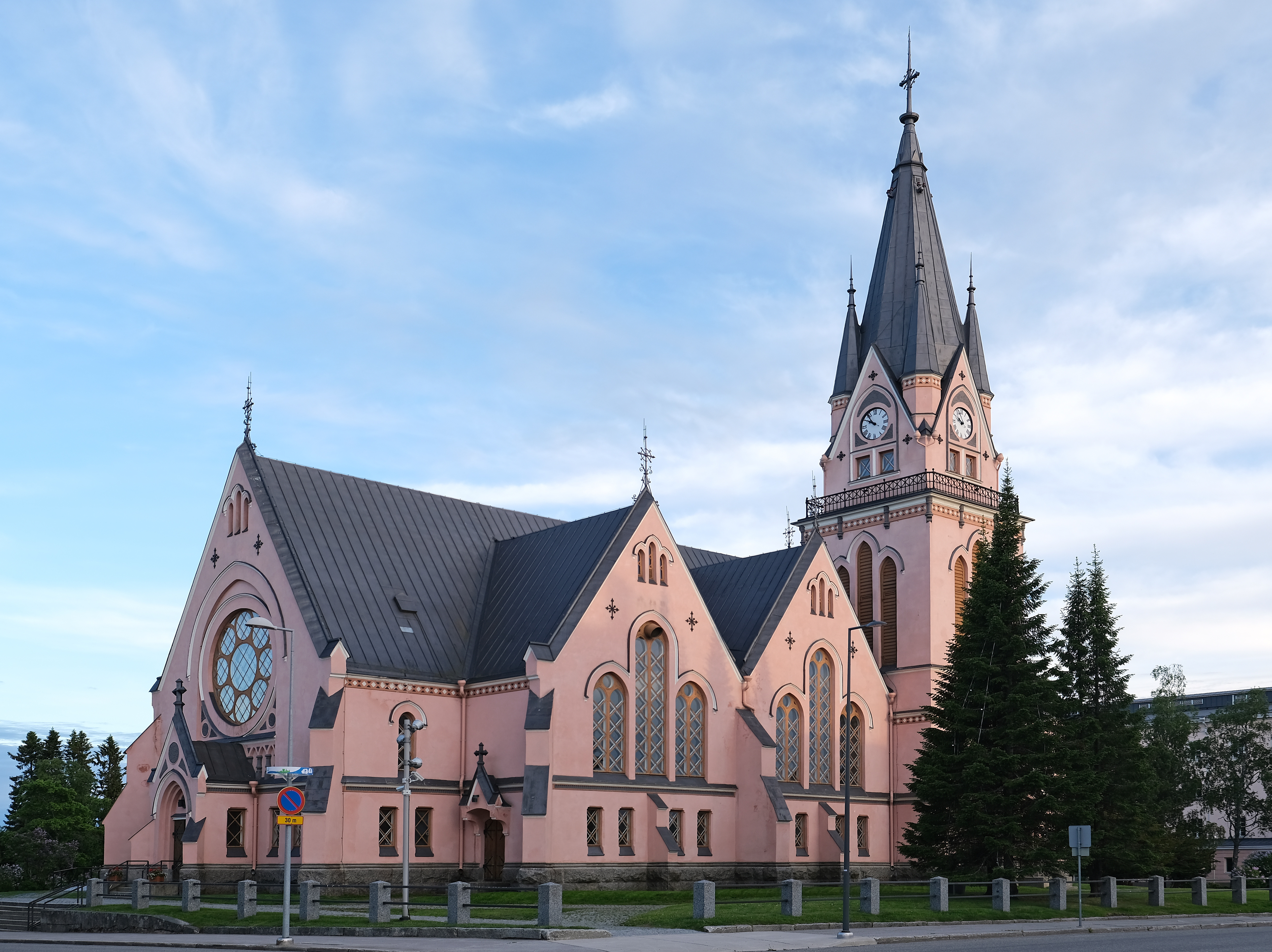
Another view of the church

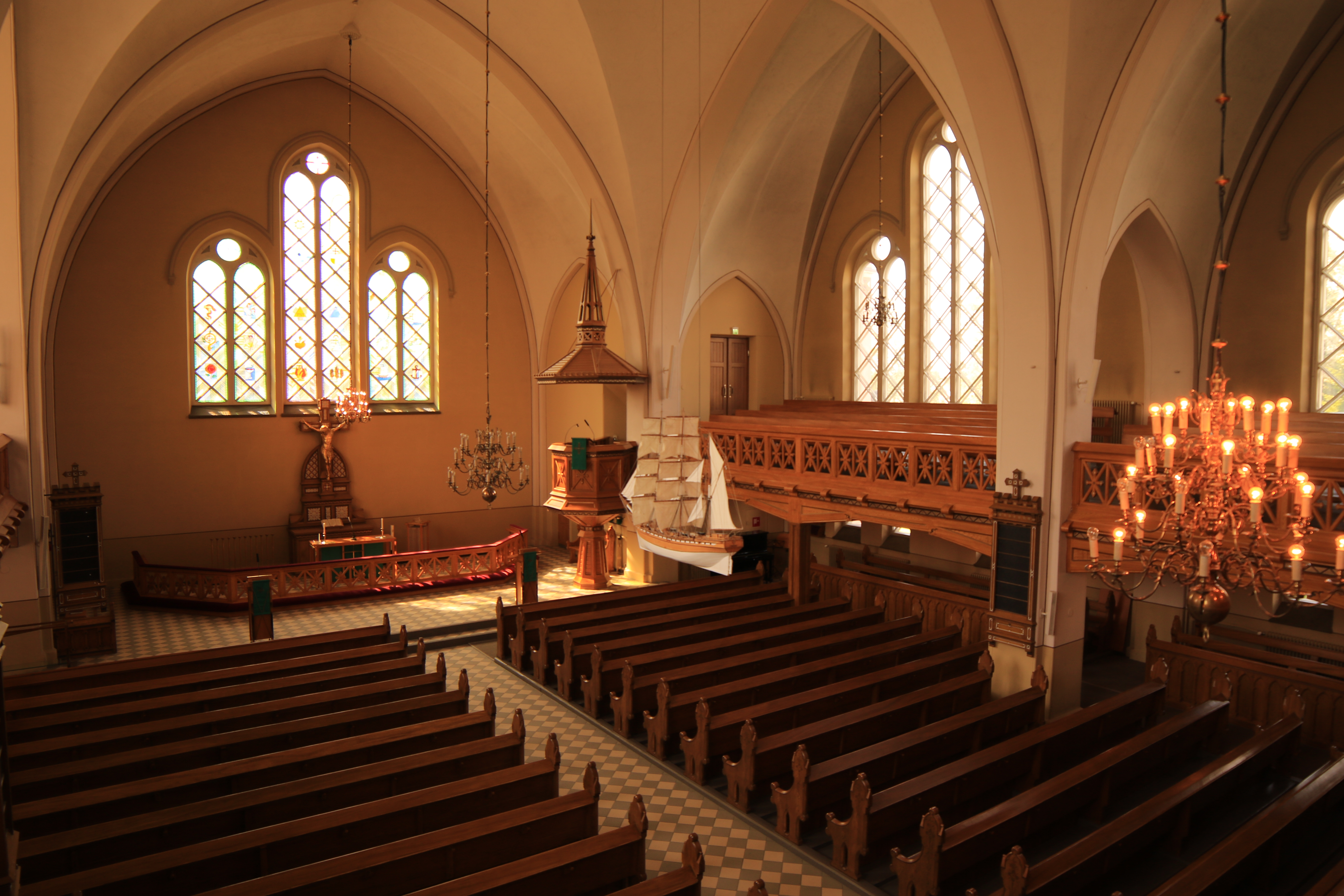
Interior of the church

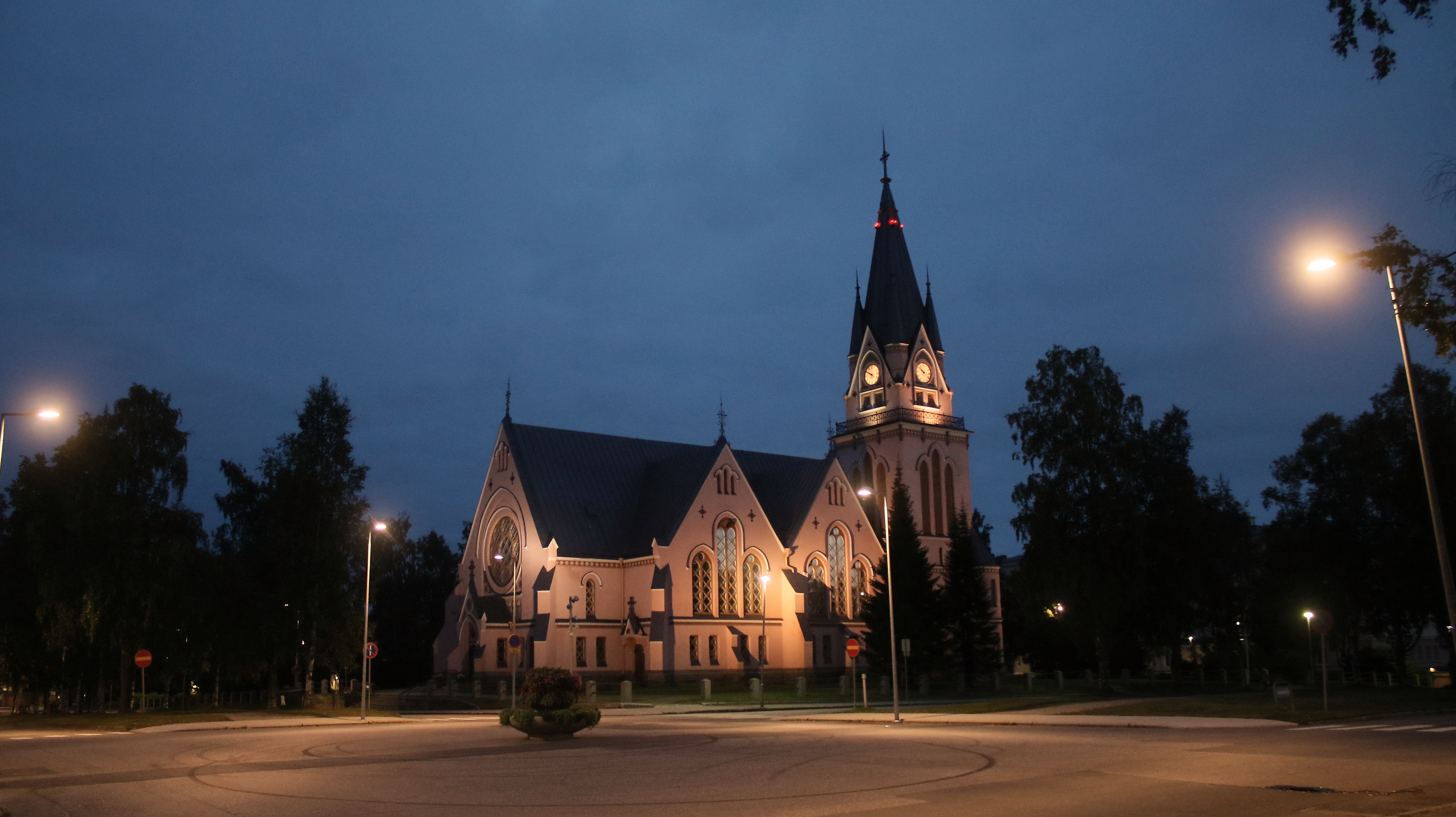
Kemi church at night
