= Nurmon Jymy =

- Full name: Nurmon Jymy
- Founded: 1925
- Ground: Nurmon Liikuntahalli, Nurmo
- Capacity: 1,500

Nurmon Jymy is a Finnish sports club with several departments, located in Nurmo.

== History ==
The club was founded in 5.5.1925.

Today the most popular departments are pesäpallo, floorball, and volleyball. Other departments are cross-country skiing, ski jumping, gymnastics, and wrestling. Before wrestling were the most popular department with many Olympic winners.

== Pesäpallo ==
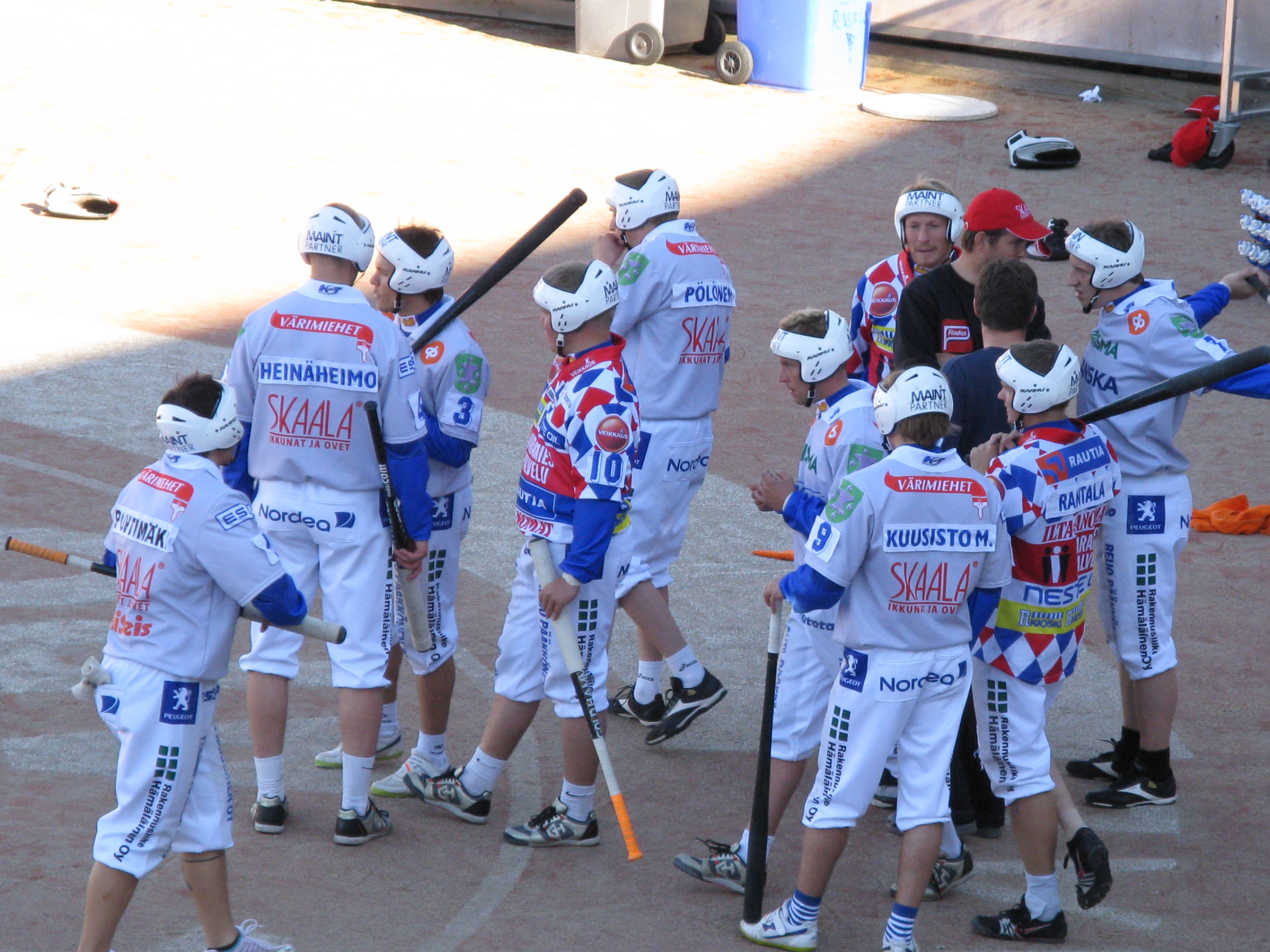
Jymys pesäpallogame on season 2008

Today, pesäpallo is the most popular department for Nurmon Jymy because the men's team play at the highest level of Finnish pesäpallo, the Superpesis. The 2012 season will be 26th for Jymy in the Superpesis. The team finished placed second in 2005, the most successful finish to date. Jymy won bronze medals for the 1956 and 2008 seasons, and won the pesäpallos cup competition Suomen cup in 1978.

== Floorball ==
Jymy has played two season's at the men's highest level: 2000–2001 and 2002–2003. Ranks were 7 and 5. After the second season Jymy had to stop play at the highest level because the club had too much debt and not enough money.

== Volleyball ==
Nurmon Jymy got up to men's 1. division after season 2003. The team played a successful season in 2. division and won the division outstanding. The team's head coach was Matti Försti.

The first season in 1. division was good to Jymy. The team saved their place in the division easily. The second season in the division the team nearly rose to the Finland volleyball league, but the bad end of the season ruined their chances. Season 2005-2006 the team played themselves to a Finland volleyball league tryout. The space in the volleyball league didn't open. Season 2006-2007 the team again played themselves to tryout for the volleyball league, but again they faced disappointment. The season 2007-2008 team was in fifth place in the 1. division. In season 2008-2009 the team was better than ever. Jymy made contact with four top-players and expectations were high.
