= St. Mary's Church of Lappee =

Church in Lappeenranta, Finland

Coordinates: 61°03′30″N 028°11′18″E

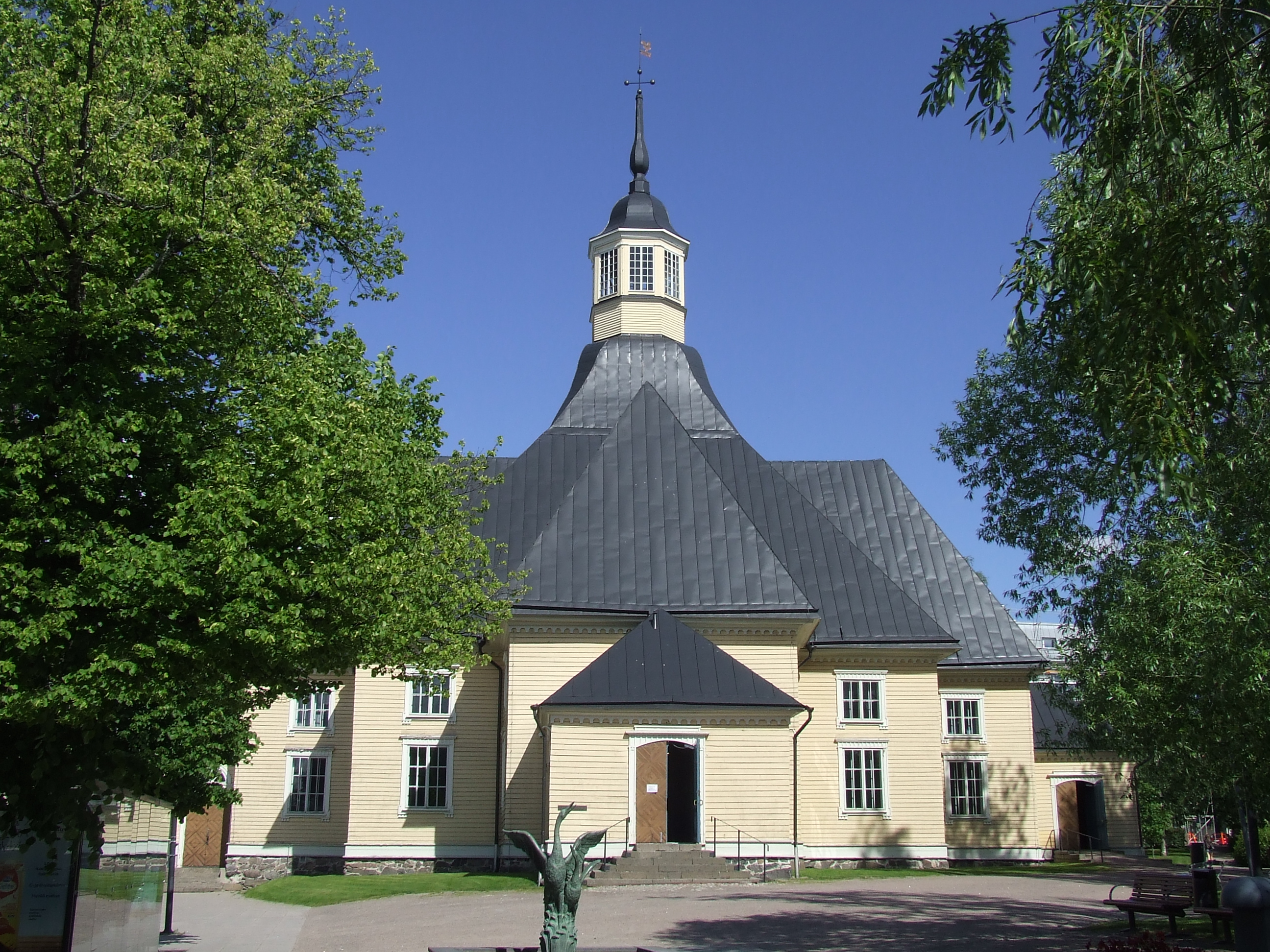
St. Mary's Church of Lappee

St. Mary's Church of Lappee (Finnish: Lappeen Marian kirkko) is a wooden Evangelical Lutheran church in the center of Lappeenranta, Finland. The construction began in April 1792 and the church was consecrated partially unfinished in June 1794. The adjacent bell tower was built half a century later in 1856.

The church was built by Juhana Salonen, a church builder from Savitaipale, and has a capacity of 840 people. Architecturally it is a so-called double cross church (Finnish: kaksoisristikirkko) and the only surviving such church from the 18th century in Finland. The altarpiece was painted by Alexandra Frosterus-Såltin in 1887 and depicts the Ascension of Jesus.

The church is listed as a nationally significant built heritage site by the Finnish National Board of Antiquities.

== See also ==
- Lauritsala Church
- Nuijamaa Church
