= Lauritsala Church =

Church in Lappeenranta, Finland

Coordinates: 61°04.22′N 28°15.40′E

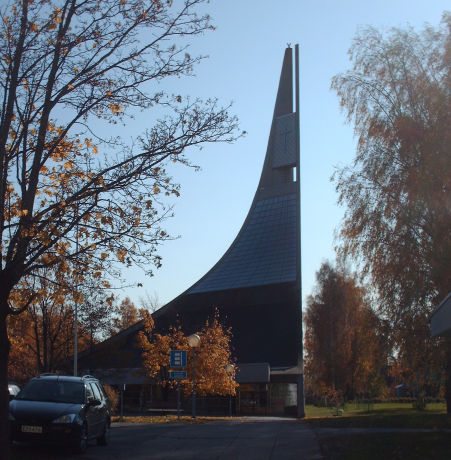
Lauritsala Church

Lauritsala Church (Finnish: Lauritsalan kirkko) is an Evangelical Lutheran church in the Lauritsala district of Lappeenranta, Finland. The church was opened in December 1969. The modernist concrete design was created by architect Toivo Korhonen and architect student Jaakko Laapotti. The basis of the design is an equilateral triangle symbolising the Holy Trinity.

The church and the adjacent parish center are listed as a nationally significant built heritage site by the Finnish National Board of Antiquities.

== See also ==
- St. Mary's Church of Lappee
