= Heinävesi Church =

Church building in Heinävesi, Finland

Coordinates: 62°25′58″N 28°37′39″E

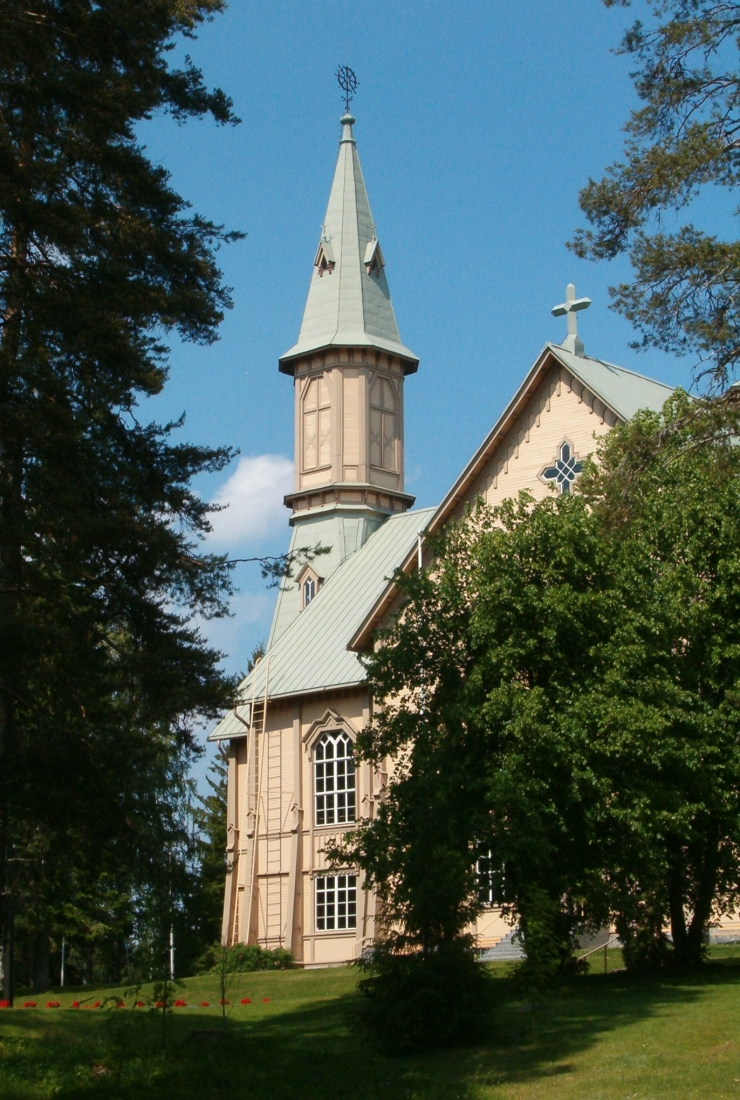
Tower of Heinävesi Church

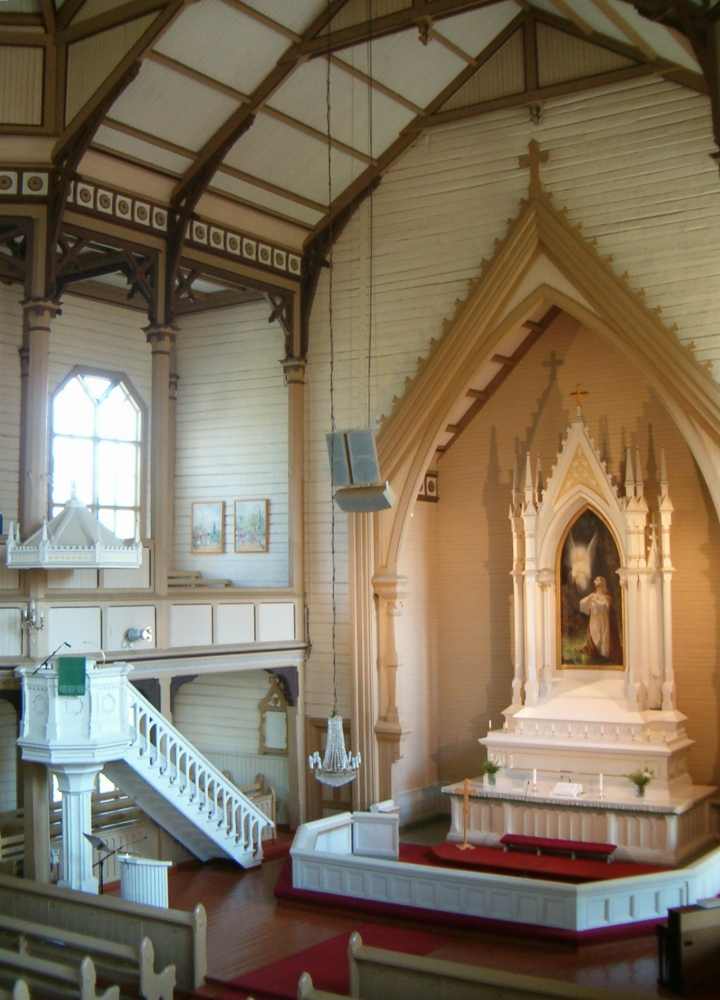
The altar

Heinävesi Church is an Evangelical Lutheran wooden church in Heinävesi, Finland. It was built in 1890–1891 and designed by Josef Stenbäck. The church represents the Gothic Revival style, like many of the other churches designed by Stenbäck.

The length of the church is 40 meters, breadth 30 meters and height 45 meters. The church has 2,000 seats and is thus the second biggest wooden church in Finland. The bell tower has two bells, a smaller one from 1765 and a larger one from 1906. The altar painting was done by Johan Kortman in 1893.

The organ was originally made by Jens Zachariassen in 1906 (25 stops). In 1981, the Organ Factory of Kangasala (Kangasalan urkutehdas) made a new organ (33 stops) using 20 stops from the original organ.

The first church in Heinävesi was a small chapel, built in 1748. The second church was a massive wooden "temple" church. It was built in 1840 and designed by Carl Ludvig Engel. The church burned down in 1887.

The churchyard also is home to a Local History Museum, the Pitäjäntupa needlework center and the old cemetery. Culturally, the great hill of the church is a historical setting. Lake Kermajärvi is located 90 meters below the top of the hill.
