= Nurmo =

Former municipality of Finland

- Former municipality
- Nurmon kunta Nurmo kommun
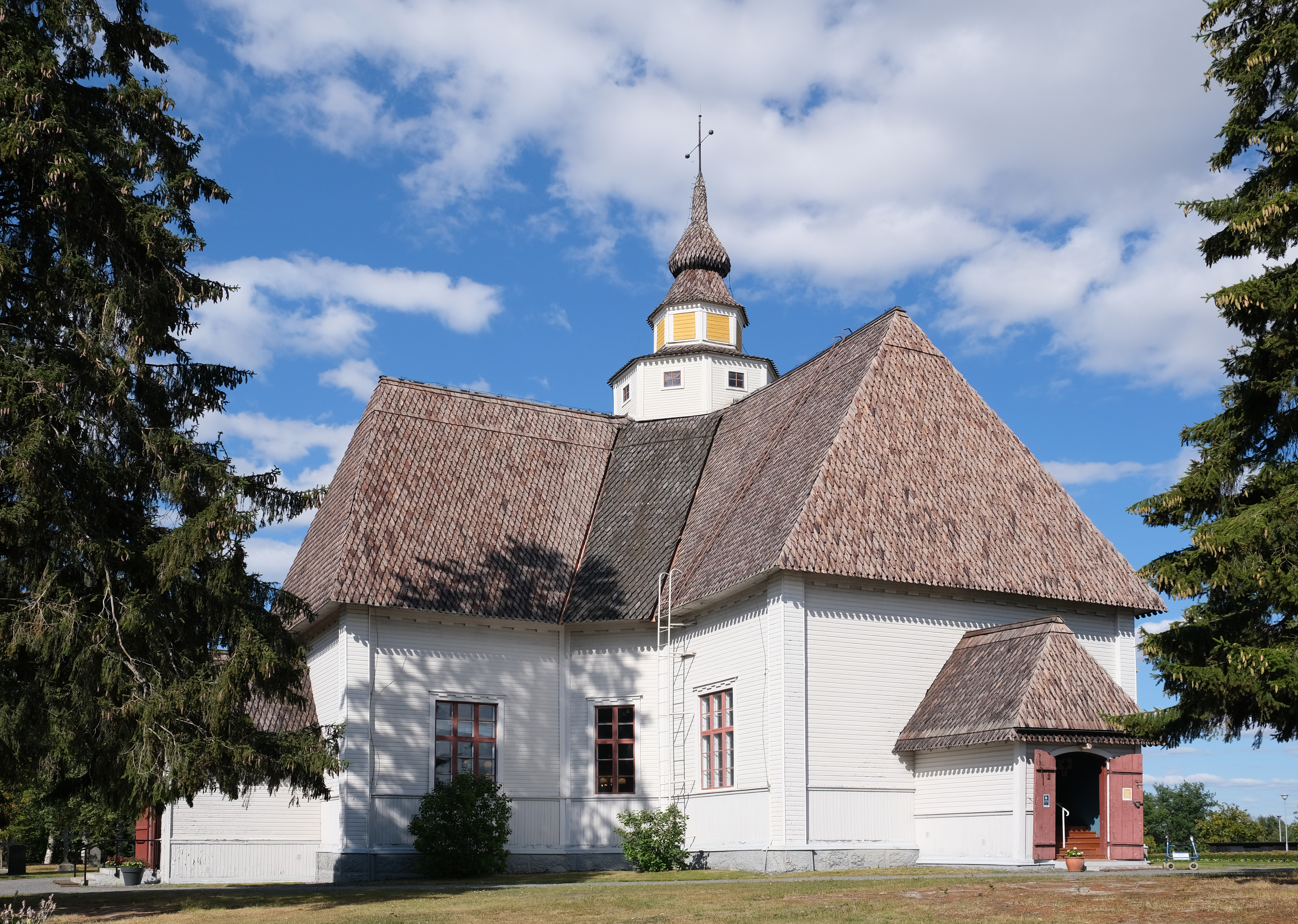
- Nurmo church

- Coat of arms

- Location of Nurmo in Finland
- Interactive map of Nurmo
- Coordinates: 62°49′40″N 022°54′30″E
- Country: Finland
- Region: South Ostrobothnia
- Sub-region: Seinäjoki sub-region
- Founded: 1868
- Consolidated: 2009

Area
  - Total: 361.88 km^{2} (139.72 sq mi)
  - Land: 347.07 km^{2} (134.00 sq mi)
  - Water: 14.81 km^{2} (5.72 sq mi)

Population (2008-12-31)
  - Total: 12,677
  - Density: 36.526/km^{2} (94.601/sq mi)
- Time zone: UTC+2 (EET)
  - Summer (DST): UTC+3 (EEST)

Nurmo is a former municipality of Finland. It was consolidated, together with Ylistaro to Seinäjoki on 1 January 2009.

It is located in the province of Western Finland and is part of the South Ostrobothnia region. The municipality had a population of 12,378 (15 April 2007) and covered an area of 361.90 km^{2} (140 sq mi) of which 14.54 km^{2} (6 sq mi) is water. The population density was 33.0 inhabitants per km².

The municipality was unilingually Finnish.

Nurmo houses the HQ and main plant of the meat company Atria, which has 1700 local employees.

In early 2007 it was proposed to merge Nurmo with the city of Seinäjoki and the neighbouring municipality of Ylistaro. Consultative referendums were held in all three municipalities. Seinäjoki voted heavily in favour; Ylistaro a bare majority in favour, and Nurmo 3:1 against. However, on 21 May 2007 Nurmo Council agreed to the merger by 18 votes to 17, and the municipality ceased to be an independent entity in 2009.
