= Manse PP =

Finnish pesäpallo club

Information
- League: Superpesis
- Location: Tampere, Finland
- Ballpark: Kauppi Stadium
- Founded: 2005
- League championships: Men: 2021; Women: 2017
- Colors: black, red, white
- Ownership: Manse PP ry
- Manager: Jani Komulainen
- Website: www.mansepp.fi

Manse PP is a Finnish professional pesäpallo team from Tampere. It was founded in 2005. Manse PP is playing in the top-tier Superpesis. As of the 2024 season, they were the only remaining team in the men's Superpesis to be located in a city with more than 100,000 residents.

Manse PP has won the men's Finnish Pesäpallo Championship (Superpesis) in 2021 and the women's Championship in 2017. The home ground of Manse PP is the Kauppi Stadium.

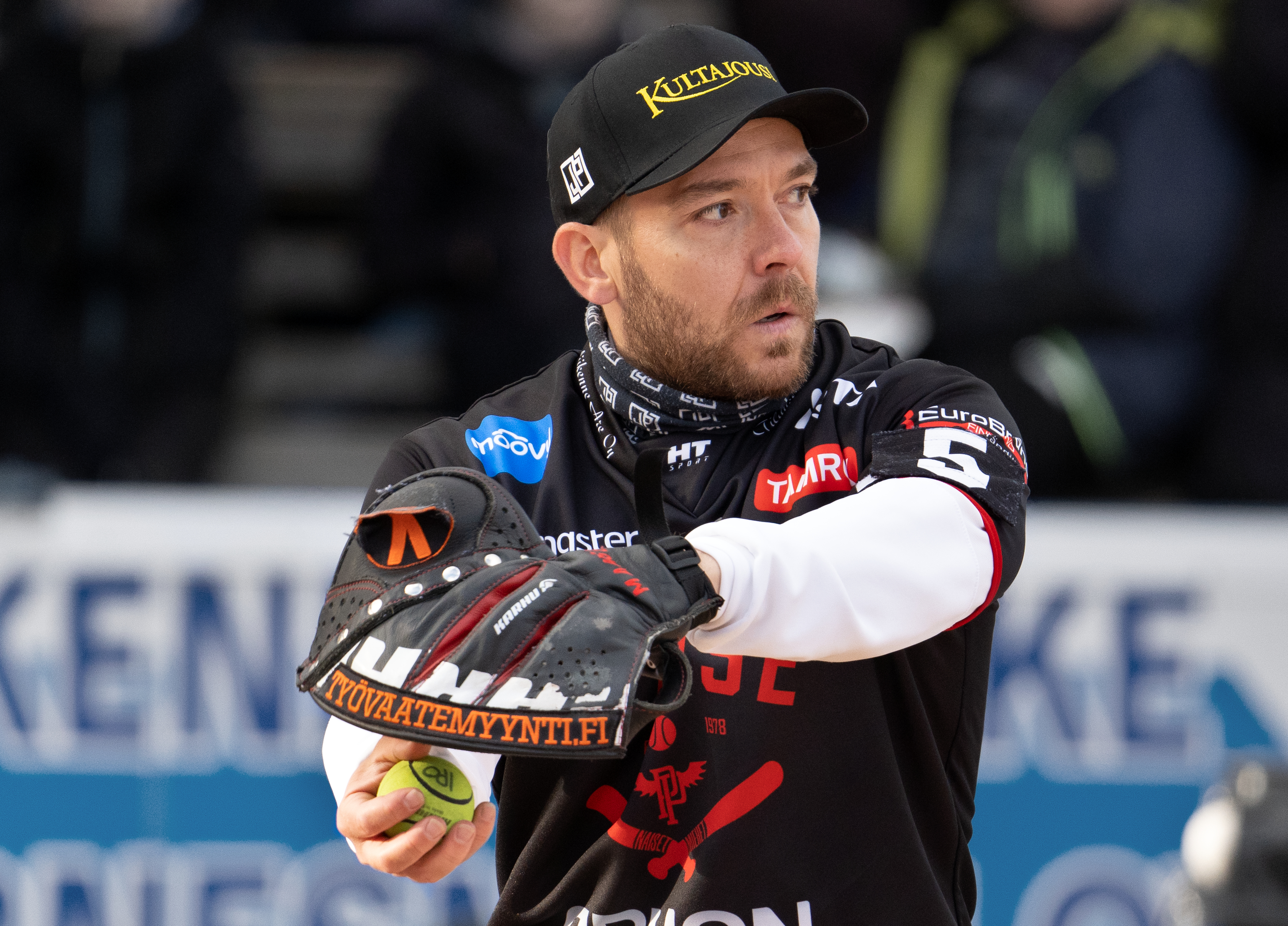
Manse PP player Juha Puhtimäki in 2023.

== History ==
Tampere's rise to the top of the men's Superpesis map was long awaited, dating back to the early 1990s, when the Finnish Baseball Association set out its ambitious metropolitan vision. The vision was not realised until 2020, when Manse PP won the First Division and was promoted to Superpesis. After the promotion, the club had to significantly strengthen its team, as there is a considerable difference in level between the First Division and Superpesis. Manse PP won the Finnish baseball championship by beating Kouvola in the fifth final in 2021.

== Achievements ==
Men's Pesäpallo
Superpesis

Winners	Second place	Third place
2021	2022	–

Women's Pesäpallo
Superpesis

Winners	Second place	Third place
2017	2018, 2020, 2022, 2023	2021
