= Hippos Stadium =

Pesäpallo stadium in Jyväskylä, Finland

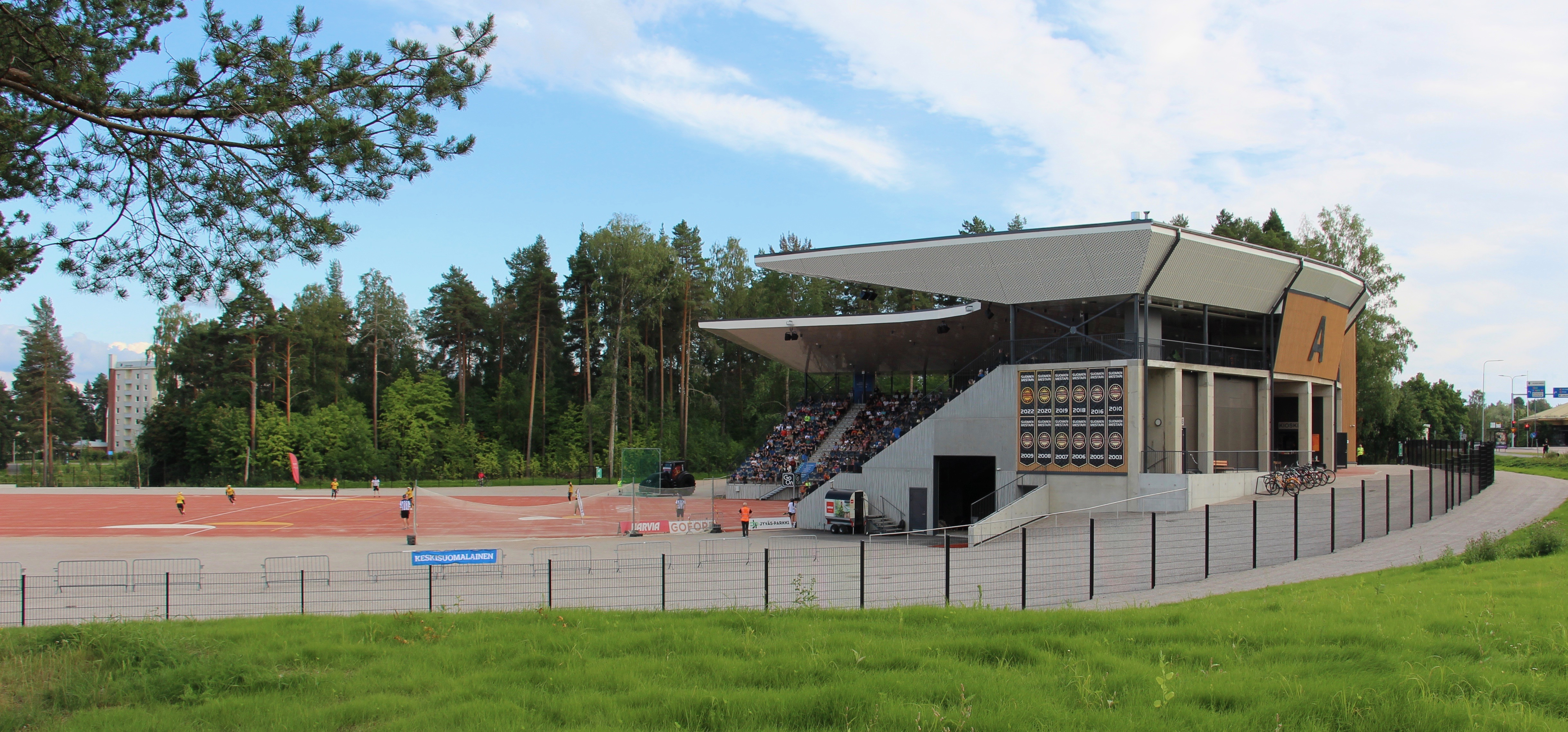
- Hippos Stadium at 2023.

- Location within Central Finland Location within Finland Location within Europe
- Address: Rautpohjankatu 6; 40700 Jyväskylä
- Location: Jyväskylä, Finland
- Coordinates: 62.234146°N 25.718489°E
- Owner: City of Jyväskylä
- Capacity: 4,500
- Record attendance: 5,496; September 9, 1979 (Jyväskylän Kiri vs. Hyvinkään Tahko)

Construction
- Opened: 1948
- Renovated: 1994, 2014
- Rebuilt: 2023

Tenants
- Jyväskylän Kiri (1948-present); Kirittäret (2005-present)

Hippos Stadium is a pesäpallo stadium located in Jyväskylä, Finland. Since its opening in 1948, it has been the home field of the Jyväskylän Kiri, a Ykköspesis team. It is also home of the Kirittäret, a Superpesis team.

Hippos Stadium is a traditional pesäpallo stadium. The fence behind the 3-side has prompted locals to repeatedly urge hitters to "hit through the fence".

== History ==
Pesäpallo moved to Hippos in 1968, when the Finnish Pesäpallo Association amended its rules to ban championship matches from being played on grass. The Old Hippos Stadium's all-time attendance record was set in 1979, when 5 496 spectators watched the final match between Kiri and Hyvinkää Tahko. The opening ceremony of the new Hippos Stadium took place in July 2023. The budget for the renovation project was €8.2 million, which was exceeded by around €80 000.

The Pesäpallo All-Star game: East-West, has been played at the Hippos Stadium four times; in the years 1949, 1977, 1980 and 2024. During the 2024 East-West weekend, 14 100 spectators attended the matches. In addition to the matches, the east–west also saw the election of new members to the Pesäpallo Hall of Fame.

== Capacity ==
The stadium has around 1850 covered seats, of which just over 1500 are seated. It is possible to increase the capacity to more than 4,000 people with additional stands. The baseball stadium has been built with accessibility in mind, including accessible seating and hearing loop seats for the hard of hearing.
