= Puna-Mustat =

Finnish pesäpallo club

Information
- League: Ykköspesis
- Location: Helsinki, Finland
- Ballpark: Meilahti Field
- Founded: 1941
- Colors: red, black
- Ownership: Puna-Mustat ry
- Website: pumu.fi

Puna-Mustat (lit. "Red-Blacks") is a Finnish pesäpallo team from Helsinki. It was founded in 1941. Puna-Mustat is currently playing in the second-tier Ykköspesis.

Puna-Mustat has won the men's Finnish Pesäpallo Championship (Superpesis) once in 1973 and the women's Championship five times in 1970, 1972, 1974–1976. The home ground of Puna-Mustat is the Meilahti Field.

== History ==
=== Golden Era and Dominance (1970–1978) ===
The early 1970s marked the competitive peak of Puna-Mustat, particularly for the women’s team. In 1970, the women captured the Finnish Championship (SM-sarja), and in a historic tribute to their dominance, the entire squad—including the manager—was selected to represent the "East" in the annual Itä–Länsi (East–West) All-Star game. The women's side remained a national powerhouse throughout the decade, securing 14 consecutive medal finishes by 1977, including further championships in 1972, 1974, 1975, and 1976.

The men’s team reached its historical zenith in 1973, winning their first and only Finnish Championship. This era of success was accompanied by organizational growth, including the acquisition of Herttoniemen Urheilijat’s divisional spot and the opening of the club’s own bingo hall. However, the men’s success was short-lived; following the tragic death of first baseman Kari Kelka in 1974, the defending champions were relegated from the top flight. By the late 1970s, both the men’s and women’s programs entered a period of decline, eventually falling into the lower regional divisions.

=== Transition and Regional Years (1979–1999) ===
During the late 1970s and early 1980s, the club's activity hit a low point, with the men’s team competing in the Helsinki district series. A slow rebuilding phase began in 1981, the club’s 40th anniversary, as the men returned to the Finnish Pesäpallo Federation (PPL) leagues. In 1982, the club moved its operations to the Haapaniemi field in Kallio to increase the sport's visibility in the capital.

The mid-1980s saw a brief return to the higher tiers when PuMu inherited the Ykkössarja (first division) spot from Helsinki-Pesis in 1985. The following decade was characterized by fluctuations between the second and third tiers (Ykköspesis and Suomensarja). Throughout the 1990s, the club shifted its focus toward youth development, aiming to build a sustainable foundation through its own academy players.

=== Modern Era: Fluctuations and Resurgence (2000–2023) ===
The turn of the millennium was difficult for PuMu, including a stint in the fourth-tier Maakuntasarja. A resurgence began in 2003, leading to a brief promotion to Ykköspesis in 2006. However, the club struggled to maintain its position and spent much of the next decade stabilizing its finances and organization in Suomensarja.

During the COVID-19 pandemic in 2020, the club focused on digital training models for juniors and structural stabilization.

=== Return to Elite Competition (2024–) ===
In 2024, Puna-Mustat launched an ambitious strategy to return Helsinki to the pinnacle of Finnish pesäpallo. The club built a formidable roster that successfully earned promotion back to Ykköspesis. This success reignited local interest and prompted discussions regarding the modernization of the Meilahti stadium to meet national Superpesis standards.

The 2025 season confirmed PuMu’s return to the elite, as the team finished second in the Ykköspesis regular season. A dramatic semi-final victory over Jyväskylän Kiri—highlighted by the clutch performances of Joona Mäkelä—sent the club to the finals. Although they narrowly missed promotion to the top-tier Superpesis after losses to Koskenkorvan Urheilijat and Imatran Pallo-Veikot in the qualifiers. The season was a commercial and athletic success, marked by significant attendance growth and a resurgence of interest in pesäpallo within the capital.

== Achievements ==
Men's Pesäpallo

| Type | Trophy | Titles | Seasons |
|---|---|---|---|
| Finnish championship | Winners | 1 | 1973 |
| Finnish championship | Second place | 1 | 1963 |
| Finnish championship | Third place | 1 | 1971 |

Women's Pesäpallo

| Type | Trophy | Titles | Seasons |
|---|---|---|---|
| Finnish championship | Winners | 5 | 1970, 1972, 1974, 1975, 1976 |
| Finnish championship | Second place | 6 | 1966, 1967, 1968, 1969, 1971, 1973 |
| Finnish championship | Third place | 4 | 1963, 1964, 1965, 1977 |
