= Kauppi Stadium =

Pesäpallo stadium in Tampere, Finland

- Kaupin pesäpallostadion
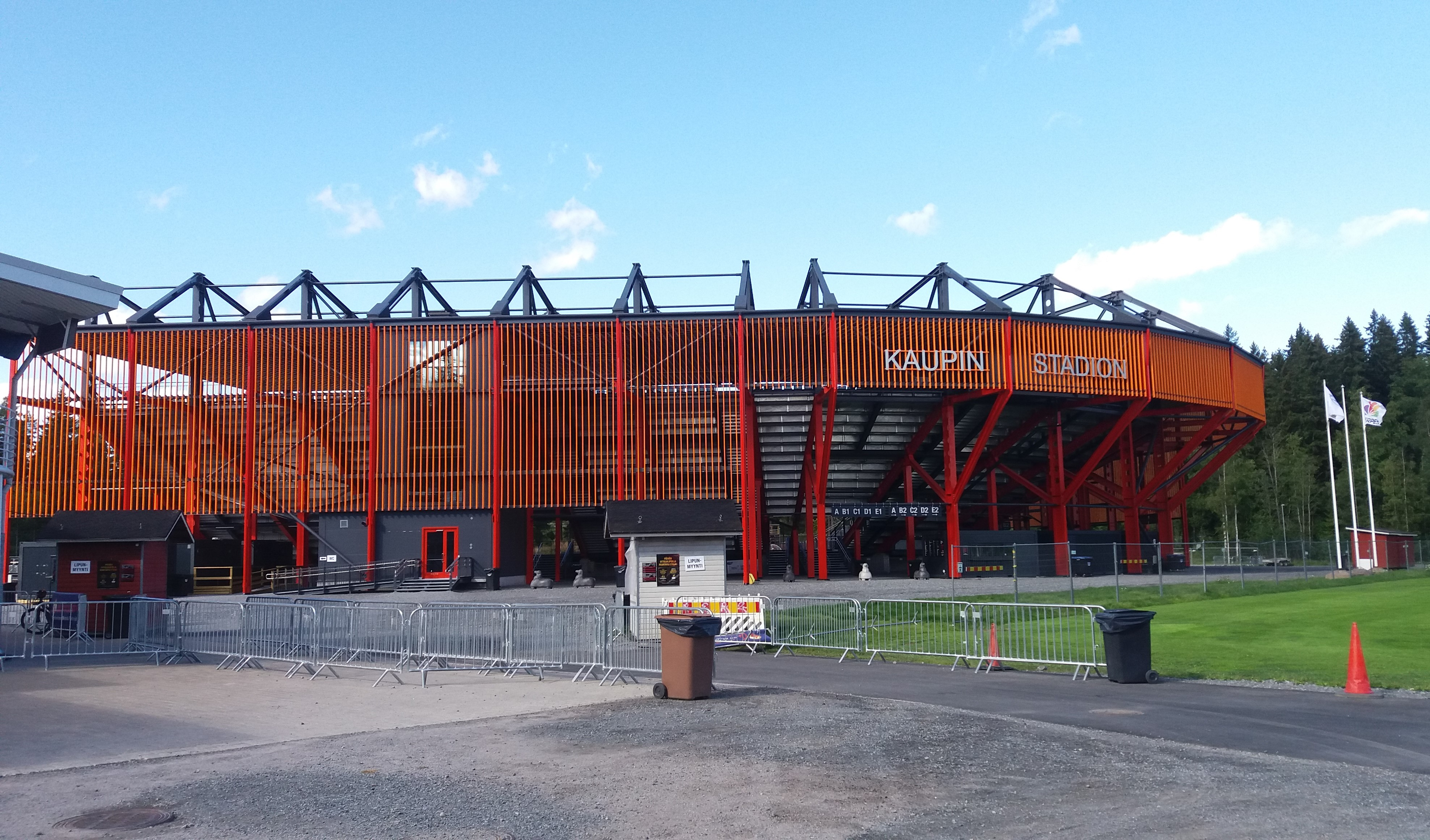
- Kauppi Stadium in 2022.

- Location within Pirkanmaa Location within Finland Location within Europe
- Full name: Kaupin pesäpallo- ja hiihtostadion
- Address: Kuntokatu 5; 33520 Tampere
- Location: Tampere, Finland
- Coordinates: 61.511657°N 23.806651°E
- Owner: City of Tampere
- Capacity: 1,800
- Surface: Clay
- Screen: Yes
- Record attendance: 2,778; May 22, 2015 (Sotkamon Jymy vs. Vimpelin Veto)
- Field size: Centre field: 113 m (371 ft)
- Field shape: Pentagon
- Public transit: Ensitie, Nysse routes 13, 14, 38; TAYS; Tampere station

Construction
- Opened: 2022
- Cost: €8,160,000

Tenant
- Manse PP (2022–)

Kauppi Stadium (Finnish: Kaupin pesäpallostadion) is a pesäpallo stadium located in Tampere, Finland. Since its opening in 2022, it has been the home field of the Manse PP, a Superpesis team.

Kauppi Stadium is located in the Kauppi Sports Park. The seats are tightly crowded and located very close to the field. The back field overlooks a wooded landscape.

Though the stadium renovation was designed in part to hold temporary extra stands by the left and right outer fields, they have generally not been put into use even during the 2024 men's Superpesis final, resulting in the left and right baselines extending much further at 90° angles than what is common for pesäpallo, making the shape of the inner half of the field slightly closer to international baseball.

The stadium also hosts cross-country skiing events on national or regional level, connecting to nearby trails to form laps.
