= Pesäpallo at the 1952 Summer Olympics =

Pesäpallo at the 1952 Summer Olympics Demonstration sport
- Games played: 1
- Date: July 31, 1952
- Venue: Helsinki Olympic Stadium
- City: Helsinki, Finland
- Baseball at the Summer Olympics
- «1936 1956»

Pesäpallo, the Finnish variant of baseball, was played as a demonstration sport at the 1952 Summer Olympics at Helsinki Olympic Stadium in Helsinki, Finland.

The ceremonial first feed, or pitch, was thrown at 18:00 on 31 July by Lauri Pihkala, who had created the sport. The teams playing were the Finnish Baseball Federation and the Finnish Workers' Sports Federation. In a match with a shortened schedule, the Finnish Baseball Federation won, 8–4.

== Rosters ==
=== Finnish Baseball League (Pesäpalloliitto) ===
- Eino Kaakkolahti, pitcher
- Leo Hannula, 1st baseman
- Viljo Niemi, left fielder
- Olli Hanski, 2nd baseman
- Antti Elomaa, catcher
- Pertti Ahonen, 3rd baseman
- Eero Vuorio, right shortstop
- Toivo Ilola, left shortstop
- Taisto Lehto, right fielder
- Viljo Kokkonen, substitute
- Pertti Jaakkola, substitute
- Eero Vilevaara, substitute

=== Worker's Athletic Federation (Työväen Urheiluliitto) ===
- Aimo Paavola, pitcher
- Osmo Juntto, 1st baseman
- Onni Sallinen, left fielder
- Jorma Harlin, 2nd baseman
- Reino Hakkarainen, catcher
- Veikko Auersalmi, 3rd baseman
- Pauli Kilpiä, right shortstop
- Paavo Reiju, left shortstop
- Lasse Heikkilä, right fielder
- Pauli Lahtinen, substitute
- Pauli Vainio, substitute
- Oiva Huuskonen, substitute

== Sources ==
- Cava, Pete (Summer 1992). "Baseball in the Olympics". Citius, Altius, Fortius. 1 (1): 7–15.
- Official Report. XV Olympiad Helsinki 1952.
- Bill Mallon, Jeroen Heijmans (2011). Historical Dictionary of the Olympic Movement. Scarecrow Press. p. 297. ISBN 9780810875227.
