= Reserve team =

Second team fielded by a sports club

In sports, a reserve team is a team composed of players who are under contract to a club but who do not regularly play in matches for the club's primary team. Reserve teams usually include players who are part of the larger first-team squad but unable to command a place in the team itself as well as young players who need playing time to improve their skills before progressing to the first team. In some countries, reserve or development teams compete in entirely separate competitions from first teams, while some countries allow reserve teams or farm teams to compete in the same league system as their club's first team, although usually in separate divisions.

== In association football ==
A club's reserve team is distinct from its youth team, which consists of players under a certain age and plays in an age-specific league. Youth players may, however, also be included in the reserve team, which usually also includes senior players who are struggling to gain or maintain a regular place in the first team. In England, Argentina and the United States the term reserve is commonly used to describe these teams. In Germany and Austria the terms Amateure or II is used, while B team is used in the Spanish football league system, the Czech Republic, Slovakia, and Portugal. In Norway, these teams are distinguished by a 2. In the Netherlands, the adjective Jong (young) is commonly used.

In England the reserve teams of professional clubs play in completely separate leagues and competitions such as the Professional Development League or the Central League, which feature only reserve teams. At semi-professional and amateur levels, however, reserve teams often feature in the same league system as their parent clubs' first teams and can be promoted through the system, albeit they cannot usually play in the same division as their parent team.

However, in other countries, reserve teams play in the same football league as their senior team and have competed in the domestic cup competitions. In Spain this has seen the reserve team of CD Málaga change identity and play in La Liga while Castilla CF, the reserve team of Real Madrid, reached the Copa del Rey final, qualified for the European Cup Winners' Cup and won the Segunda División.

=== Bulgaria ===
Since 2015, the Bulgarian Football Union allowed Bulgarian teams to have reserve sides in Bulgarian football league system, obliged to play one level below their main side and also can not compete in the Bulgarian Cup. On 26 May 2023, CSKA 1948 II secured first place in Second League, the second level of Bulgarian football, becoming the first reserve team to become a champion of the league.

Clubs are also allowed have third teams in the league system.

=== France ===
In France, the reserve teams of professional clubs playing in Ligue 1, Ligue 2 or Ligue 3 is restricted to play in fourth-tier Championnat National 1 if the club has a youth center or in fifth-tier Championnat National 2 if a team doesn't have a youth center. Reserve teams have not been allowed to play the Coupe de France to serve the non-reserve team's interests.

However, if the first team plays or get relegated in the fourth-tiered National 1, the reserve team is restricted to a fifth-tiered level.

If a reserve team finishes first in his National 2 group, the promotion is awarded to the second. Additionally, if a reserve team finishes first in his National 3 group but the club doesn't have a youth center, the promotion is instead awarded to the second.

Some professional or amateurs clubs engage a third or even a fourth team in the French football league system, especially in lower divisions. In some extreme cases, a fifth team can be engaged.

=== Germany ===
In Germany, Hertha BSC II, the reserve team of Hertha Berlin, reached the 1992–93 DFB-Pokal final after their first team were eliminated in the Round of 16. They lost the final 1–0 to Bayer Leverkusen. In the German football league system, however, reserve teams are not allowed to be promoted above the 3. Liga and since 2008–09 have not been allowed to play in the cup competition to serve the non-reserve team's interests. In the 2003–04 season, Bayern Munich's reserve team won the Regionalliga Süd, a semi-professional league then in the third tier of German football (now the fourth), finishing nine points clear of the second-placed FC Rot-Weiß Erfurt. Due to the rule which prohibits one club from having two teams in fully professional leagues, the third-placed 1. FC Saarbrücken was promoted to the Second Bundesliga instead.

=== Italy ===
In 2018, the Italian Football Federation allowed the possibility for Serie A teams to register a reserve Under-23 team that would initially play in the third-tier Serie C. In that same year, Juventus was the first team to seize this opportunity, creating Juventus Next Gen. Five years later, in 2023, Atalanta created his reserve team, Atalanta Under-23. In 2024, AC Milan became the third Italian club to form a reserve team, with the creation of Milan Futuro. In 2025 also Inter Milan created his reserve team, the Inter Milan Under-23.

=== Japan ===
From the days of the old Japan Soccer League, Japan allowed reserve teams to play in the main league system. Even today reserve teams of J. League clubs are allowed to compete in the Emperor's Cup.

==== Japan Soccer League reserve teams ====
These teams were never promoted to the top flight due to their senior squad's presence there.

- Toyo Industries/Mazda: Mazda Auto Hiroshima
- Furukawa Electric: Furukawa Electric Chiba
- Yomiuri Soccer Club: Yomiuri S.C. Juniors
- Yanmar Diesel: Yanmar Club

Reserve clubs were usually localized in the same city as their senior team and should not be confused with clubs from sister companies within a keiretsu or otherwise, which were separate clubs competing for the same championships. An example is Toyota Automated Loom Works, founding member of the JSL in 1965, later relegated and now competing in the Aichi Prefecture league, and Toyota Motors, now known as Nagoya Grampus, founding member and mainstay of the J. League.

==== J. League reserve teams today ====
Most J. League reserve teams these days are in the corresponding regional league. The most successful was JEF United Ichihara Chiba Reserves, who competed in the then national third division, the Japan Football League. (Furukawa Electric Chiba still exists but is no longer affiliated with the JEF club.)

=== Poland ===
In Poland, football reserve teams (Polish: rezerwy) are developmental squads fielded by professional clubs and entered into the same open-league pyramid as independent sides. They play regular league matches but cannot compete in the same division as their first team. Until 2020, the regulations of the Polish Football Association required a two-tier gap between the first and reserve sides; this was changed so that now a one-tier difference is sufficient. Reserve teams may be promoted or relegated like any other club, but if their parent club drops into the same division, the reserve team is automatically moved one level down.

=== Norway ===
In Norway, reserve football teams are permitted to participate at all levels of league football except for the two highest divisions, making the 2. divisjon the highest league they can enter. However, if the first team plays in the second-tiered 1. divisjon, the reserve team is restricted to a fourth-tier league, maintaining a league difference of two. Reserve teams bear the same name as their respective first teams with a "2" attached as a suffix. If a reserve team ends the season in a promotion spot to a league it cannot enter, that promotion is instead awarded to the best following team.

=== Scotland ===
Scotland has two reserve leagues under the umbrella of the SPFL Reserve League, where 27 of the senior clubs competed in its first year, only for several (including Celtic and Rangers) withdrew to pursue their own programme of fixtures. The predecessor was the SPFL Development League until 2018. It was described as a development league for under-20s, but teams could field up to five over-age players in each game.

Reserve teams (limited to under-21 players) of the clubs in the Scottish Premiership enter the Scottish Challenge Cup for lower division clubs (and some entrants from other parts of the British Isles). Proposals have been made by the bigger clubs to have 'B teams' placed into the Scottish football league system, but as of 2020 these have been rejected.

=== South Korea ===
The South-Korean R League serves as a dedicated competition for reserve teams and has been intermittently active since 1990, with several interruptions and format changes throughout its history. In its current form, the league has been played since 2016.

=== Spain ===
Reserve teams in Spain play in the same league pyramid as their parent club but may not play in the same division. Since 1990 reserve teams are restricted to play in Copa del Rey.

==== Segunda División ====
In 1951–52 CD Mestalla, the reserve team of Valencia CF, won the Segunda División promotion play-off but were denied promotion because their senior team was already in the Primera División. The following season CD España Industrial, the reserve team of FC Barcelona, also finished as runners-up in the same play-off but were similarly denied. However, after winning another promotion play-off in 1956, España Industrial separated from FC Barcelona and were renamed CD Condal. The club were now able to be promoted to the Primera División. However, they survived only one season and were relegated in 1957. In 1968 the club rejoined the FC Barcelona family as the reserve team and eventually evolved into FC Barcelona B.

In 1983–84 Castilla CF and Bilbao Athletic, the reserve teams of Real Madrid and Athletic Bilbao respectively, finished as winners and runners-up of the Segunda División. Castilla, Bilbao Athletic and Atlético Madrid B finished third in 1987–88, 1989–90 and 1998–99 respectively. In normal circumstances, these teams would have all been promoted except for the fact that their senior team was already in the Primera División.

==== Special cases ====
===== Castilla CF in Copa del Rey =====
In 1980 Castilla CF also reached the Copa del Rey final and qualified for the European Cup Winners' Cup. During their cup run, they beat four Primera División teams including Hércules CF, Athletic Bilbao, Real Sociedad and Sporting de Gijón. The latter two eventually finished second and third in the Primera División. In the final they played Real Madrid but lost 6–1. However, because Real also won La Liga, Castilla CF qualified for European Cup Winners' Cup. Despite beating West Ham United 3–1 in the opening game at the Bernabéu, they lost the return 5–1 and went out in the first round.

===== Málaga CF =====
Málaga CF was originally formed in 1948 as Atlético Malagueño, the reserve team of CD Málaga. In 1992 CD Málaga was disbanded and two years later Atlético Malagueño were relaunched as Málaga CF. They were eventually promoted to the Primera División in 1999.

=== Thailand ===
There was a Reserve League in the Thai Premier League from 2016 onwards.

=== Ukraine ===
In Ukraine, there are two types of reserve teams, one doubles and the other dvushky (dviyky, triyky) or second teams. The second teams compete in regular league competitions usually in the Ukrainian Second League or lower, some better have competed in the Ukrainian First League (such as FC Dynamo-2 Kyiv). Also some smaller clubs voluntarily would join bigger club as its farm (Ternopil-Nyva-2, Poltava-2 Karlivka, others), while other would be forced to be revived anew as the original club would be changed into a new better club. On rare occasions in the professional league competitions were allowed to compete some clubs' academies (Sports school of Olympic Reserve (SSOR) Metalurh, FC Dnipro-75 Dnipropetrovsk, others). Until 1999 second teams and third teams were allowed to compete in the Ukrainian Cup.

Since 1999–2000 in Ukraine started to talk about reviving some kind of separate competition for such teams or youth competitions. In 2004 there was organized competition for the Vyshcha Liha teams doubles. Some doubles were formed out of already existing second teams, other clubs kept their second teams as well as created additional doubles. It certainly reduced the number of second teams in regular league competitions as well eliminated some farm clubs. In 2008, championship among doubles was transitioned to youth competition (under-21) as Vyshcha Liha was also transformed into Premier Liha. In 2012, there was introduced additional competition in Premier Liha, the under-19 championship (see Ukrainian Premier League Reserves and Under 19). All these youth competitions "cleaned" the lower league structure of the second teams, but some clubs continue field them at national or regional levels.

In Ukraine, second teams act same as farm teams and they do not have an age restriction as youth teams. Second teams are not allowed to compete in the same division with their primary team (senior team). On several occasions, the second team of Dynamo Kyiv (Dynamo-2 Kyiv) won the Ukrainian First League, but was not allowed to be promoted to premiers where the primary team of Dynamo Kyiv competes due to the rule. As any rules there are some exceptions, the second team of FC Nyva Ternopil (FC Ternopil) were allowed promotion to the same division after it lost its affiliation with the main club and promoted to professional ranks starting again from regional competitions.

As it was mentioned above, farm teams in Ukraine are not necessary denoted with 2 (or 3), but could be a separate club that have an agreement with another club. Among examples there are FC Karlivka that used to be called FC Poltava-2 (the second team of FC Poltava), FC Kalush was known as LUKOR Kalush and Prykarpattia Kalush (the second team of FC Spartak Ivano-Frankivsk), FC Krasyliv was known as FC Krasyliv-Obolon as the second team of FC Obolon Kyiv, and there are other examples.

=== United States ===
Major League Soccer, the highest level of competition in the United States soccer league system, runs its own distinct reserve league, MLS Next Pro, which began play in 2022. Since the United States does not use promotion and relegation, there is no risk of reserve teams having to compete against their parent teams. MLS Next Pro is officially designated as a third-tier league, and it includes a small number of independent teams not affiliated with an MLS team. Most reserve teams play in the same stadiums or the training stadium for their parent team, but several have been established in alternative or nearby markets.

Prior to the establishment of MLS Next Pro, most MLS reserve teams participated in the second-tier USL Pro league (now known as the USL Championship) from 2014 to 2022. The league is operated by United Soccer League, a separate organization from MLS, and included independent teams that signed affiliation pacts with MLS teams. A few other MLS teams fielded their reserve teams in the third-tier USL League One, also operated by USL, and some MLS teams never fielded a reserve side in either USL league. Prior to the arrangement with the USL, MLS ran its own reserve league, the MLS Reserve League, from 2005 to 2014.

Since 2016, the U.S. Open Cup has only permitted one team to participate per organization, thus excluding reserve teams if its parent team is participating. MLS attempted to exclusively field its reserve teams in place of its first teams in the 2024 edition to relieve fixture congestion. This proposal was rejected by the U.S. Soccer Federation and ultimately resulted in a compromise where only eight MLS first teams would participate while the rest fielded their reserve teams.

== Other sports ==
=== Pesäpallo ===
Many clubs in the Finnish pesäpallo league system field reserve teams that play in the same system, and the reserve teams can be promoted up to the tier 2 Ykköspesis if their main teams play in the tier 1 Superpesis at the time. In the 2025 Ykköspesis seasons, at least 5 of the 29 teams (across both genders) were reserve teams, including, but not limited to, Kouvolan Pallonlyöjät 2 (men), Pesäkarhut-Akatemia (the reserve team of Pesäkarhut women), and Kirittärien Talent (the reserve team of Kirittäret women).

=== Baseball ===
In the United States and Canada, all Major League Baseball (MLB) teams maintain affiliations with teams in the various leagues that comprise Minor League Baseball (MiLB), which act as their farm teams. While all players on MiLB teams are under contract to their parent clubs, MLB teams (who maintain a 26-man active roster) additionally maintain a 40-man roster, which is expanded with addition of players on a major league contract but who are playing on a minor league team; these players may be called up to the main team at any given time and act as a de facto reserve team.

In Japan and South Korea, the teams of Nippon Professional Baseball (NPB) and the KBO League maintain reserve squads that play in their own developmental leagues, the Eastern League and Western League in Japan and the KBO Futures League in South Korea. The NBP also maintains the Developmental Player System of reserve players who are prohibited from playing for the main squad of their team.

=== Ice hockey ===
In the United States and Canada, National Hockey League (NHL) teams maintain affiliations with teams in the American Hockey League (AHL) and ECHL. NHL teams are limited to having 50 total players under contract, of which no more than 23 players may be on their active roster; the excess reserve players are assigned to their parent club's AHL or ECHL affiliate to play alongside players who are not signed to a contract with the parent club. NHL teams also maintain an expanded 80 player maximum "reserve list" consisting of their 50 contracted player limit with the addition of any signed junior ice hockey players with less than 11 professional games played and unsigned NHL draft choices.

== See also ==
- Australian Football League reserves affiliations
- National Rugby League reserves affiliations
- Farm team
- Junior varsity
- Scout team and practice squad, teams and units that practices against the main roster
