= Mehtimäki Stadium =

Pesäpallo stadium in Joensuu, Finland

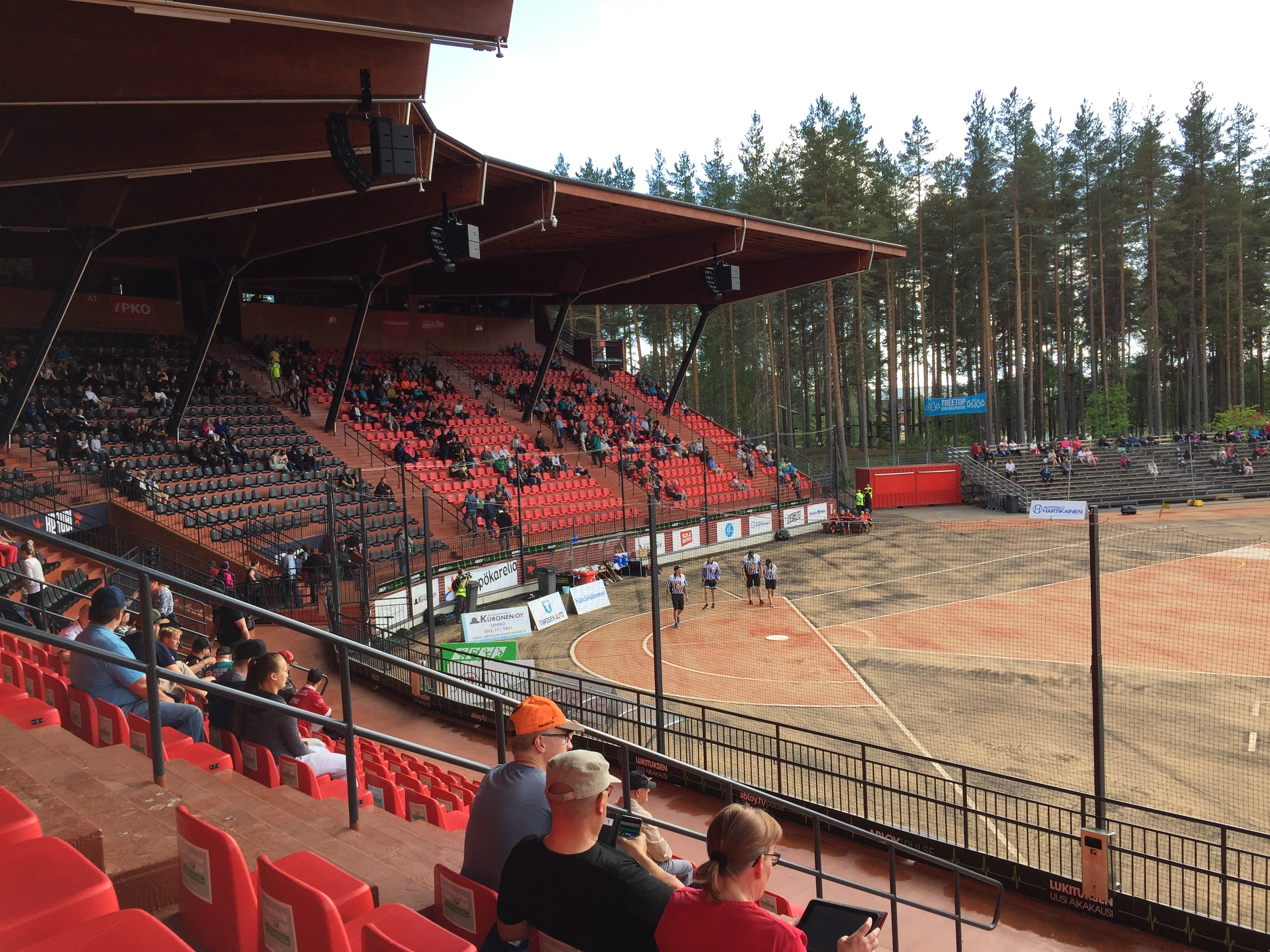
- Mehtimäki Stadium at 2018.

- Location within North Karelia Location within Finland Location within Europe
- Address: Lähteläntie 4; 80110 Joensuu
- Location: Joensuu, Finland
- Coordinates: 62.602659°N 29.740868°E
- Owner: City of Joensuu
- Capacity: 3,700–4,500
- Record attendance: 4,500; July 1, 2018 (All-Star Game)

Construction
- Opened: 2018

Tenant
- Joensuun Maila (2018–present)

Mehtimäki Stadium is a pesäpallo stadium located in Joensuu, Finland. Since its opening in 2018, it has been the home field of the Joensuun Maila, a Superpesis team.

The venue has 2500 covered seats and with various temporary solutions, the Mehtimäki Stadium can have up to 5000 seats. At 2018, the pitch surface was resurfaced in the club's colours—black and red.
