= Pesäpallo World Cup =

International pesäpallo tournament

Pesäpallo World Cup is an international tournament in pesäpallo by World Pesäpallo Federation (WPF) that has been organised twelve times so far: Finland in 1992, 1997, 2009, 2017, and 2023; Australia in 2000, 2012 and 2026; Sweden in 2003; Germany in 2006; Switzerland in 2015 and India in 2019.

Women and mixed teams have been played in 1992 and again since year 2000.

== Tournaments and medalists ==
Year	Gold	Silver	Bronze	Organiser
1992	Finland (men); Finland (women); Finland (mixed team)	Sweden (men); Sweden (women); Sweden (mixed team)	Australia (men); Australia (women); Australia (mixed team)	Helsinki, Finland
1997	Finland (men)	Sweden (men)	Estonia (men)	Hyvinkää, Finland
2000	Finland (men); Finland (women); Finland (mixed team)	Australia (men); Australia (women); Sweden (mixed team)	Germany (men) Australia (mixed team)	Melbourne, Australia
2003	Finland (men); Finland (women); Finland (mixed team)	Sweden (men); Sweden (women); Sweden (mixed team)	Germany (men); Australia (women); Germany (mixed team)	Södertälje, Sweden
2006	Finland (men); Finland (women); Finland (mixed team)	Germany (men); Australia (women); Germany (mixed team)	Germany (men); Germany (women); Australia (mixed team)	München, Germany
2009	Finland (men); Finland (women); Finland (mixed team)	Germany (men); Australia (women); Australia (mixed team)	Australia (men); Sweden (women); Germany (mixed team)	Pori, Finland
2012	Finland (men); Finland (women); Finland (mixed team)	Australia (men); Australia (women); Australia (mixed team)	Germany / Switzerland / Europe (men); Germany / Switzerland / Europe (mixed team)	Gold Coast, Australia
2015	Finland (men); Finland (mixed team)	Australia (men); Australia (mixed team)	Germany (men); Switzerland (mixed team)	Lucerne, Switzerland
2017	Finland (men); Finland (women); Finland (mixed team)	Germany (men); Australia (women); Australia (mixed team)	Australia (men); India (women); Germany (mixed team)	Turku, Finland
2019	Finland (men); Finland (women); Finland (mixed team)	Switzerland (men); Bangladesh (women); Bangladesh (mixed team)	Bangladesh (men); India (women); India (mixed team)	Pune, India
2023	Finland (men); Finland (women); Finland (mixed team)	Australia (men); Switzerland (women); Germany (mixed team)	Germany (men); Australia (women); Sweden (mixed team)	Hyvinkää, Finland
2026	Finland (men); Finland (women); Finland (mixed team)	Australia / Germany (men); Australia A (women); Canada (mixed team)	Australia B (women); Australia A (mixed team)	Sydney, Australia
2028				Toronto, Canada

== Medal table ==
The points have been counted as follow: Gold = 3 points, silver = 2 points and bronze = 1 point.

Position	Country	Gold			Silver			Bronze			Total	Points
		M	F	MX	M	F	MX	M	F	MX		
1.	Finland	12	10	11	0	0	0	0	0	0	33	99
2.	Australia	0	0	0	4	6	4	3	4	4	25	39
3.	Germany	0	0	0	4	0	2	5	1	3	15	21
4.	Sweden	0	0	0	3	2	3	0	1	1	10	18
5.	Bangladesh	0	0	0	0	1	1	1	0	0	3	5
5.	Switzerland	0	0	0	1	1	0	0	0	1	3	5
7.	India	0	0	0	0	0	0	0	2	1	3	3
8.	South Australia	0	0	0	1	0	0	0	0	0	1	2
8.	Canada	0	0	0	0	0	1	0	0	0	1	2
8.	Combined team	0	0	0	0	0	0	1	0	1	2	2
10.	Estonia	0	0	0	0	0	0	1	0	0	1	1
11.	Japan	0	0	0	0	0	0	0	0	0	0	0
11.	Nepal	0	0	0	0	0	0	0	0	0	0	0
11.	United States	0	0	0	0	0	0	0	0	0	0	0
