= Kirittäret =

Finnish sports club

Information
- League: Superpesis
- Location: Jyväskylä, Finland
- Ballpark: Hippos Stadium
- Founded: 2005
- Colors: orange, black, white
- Ownership: Jyväskylän Kirittäret ry
- Manager: Mattias Kitola
- Website: www.kirittaret.fi

Kirittäret is a Finnish women's pesäpallo team from Jyväskylä. It was founded in 2005. Kirittäret is playing in the top-tier women's Superpesis.

Kirittäret has won the women's Finnish Pesäpallo Championship (Superpesis) 12 times in years 2003, 2005–2010, 2016, 2018–2020 and 2022. The home ground of Kirittäret is the Hippos Stadium.

== Achievements ==
Women's Pesäpallo

Superpesis

Winners	Second place	Third place
2003, 2005, 2006, 2007, 2008, 2009, 2010, 2016, 2018, 2019, 2020, 2022	2001, 2002, 2004, 2011, 2012, 2014, 2015, 2021	2013
