= Eino Kaakkolahti =

Finnish pesäpallo player

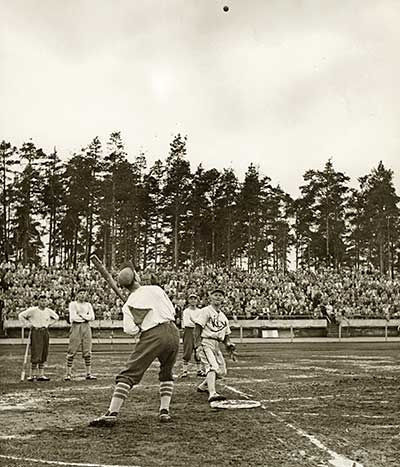
- Eino Kaakkolahti (man on base) in 1958
- Born: 25 April 1929
- Died: 25 June 2014 (aged 85)
- Occupation: Pesäpallo player

Eino Vihtori Kaakkolahti (25 April 1929 — 25 June 2014) was a Finnish pesäpallo player.

During his 18 seasons in the Finnish championship league, he won a total of 10 medals and 6 awards, and was chosen Pesäpallo Player of the Year in 1961. In 1973 and '74, Kaakkolahti was vice chairman of Suomen Pesäpalloliitto (The Finnish Pesäpallo Association, or PPL for short).

Eino Kaakkolahti's little brother, Matti Kaakkolahti, is a ski jumping medalist and has played pesäpallo in the Finnish series.

== Achievements ==
Award	Years	Ref
4 Gold	1953, 1954, 1957, 1958	
3 Silver	1949, 1952, 1954	
3 bronze	1950, 1951, 1961	
15 East-West matches	1948–1964	
Pesäpallo Player of the Year	1950, 1951, 1961	
Pesäpallo Master of the Year (6)	1951–1954, 1961, 1964	
Pesäpallo King	1952	
