= Ykköspesis =

- Formerly: Ykkössarja
- Sport: Pesäpallo
- Founded: 1991
- Owner: Pesäpalloliitto
- No. of teams: 12 (men); 17 (women)
- Country: Finland
- Most recent champions: Koskenkorvan Urheilijat (men); Oulun Lippo Naiset (women)
- Broadcaster: Nelonen Media
- Level on pyramid: 2
- Promotion to: Superpesis
- Relegation to: Suomensarja (pesäpallo)
- Domestic cup: Pesäpallon Suomen Cup (defunct)
- Website: ykkospesis.fi

Ykköspesis (lit. 'First pesäpallo') is the second-highest level of the Finnish pesäpallo league system. Seasons usually run from May to late August or early September. There are separate leagues for men (Miesten Ykköspesis), women (Naisten Ykköspesis), under-19 boys and under-19 girls (Nuorten Ykköspesis).

The league was founded as Ykkössarja in 1981 as the new second-tier league, a status previously held by the Suomensarja, which instead became the third tier. It got its current name Ykköspesis in 1991.

The reigning champions as of after the 2025 season are Koskenkorvan Urheilijat (men) who won the best-of-5 final against Puna-Mustat 3 games to 1, and Oulun Lippo Naiset (women) who won the best-of-3 final against Haminan Palloilijat 2 games to none.

Since the league system uses promotion and relegation, Ykköspesis is not a minor league as such. Reserve teams are allowed to play in Ykköspesis if they are promoted to it from Suomensarja (provided their A teams play in Superpesis at the time), and 3 such reserve teams played in the 2025 Ykköspesis season.

== Format ==
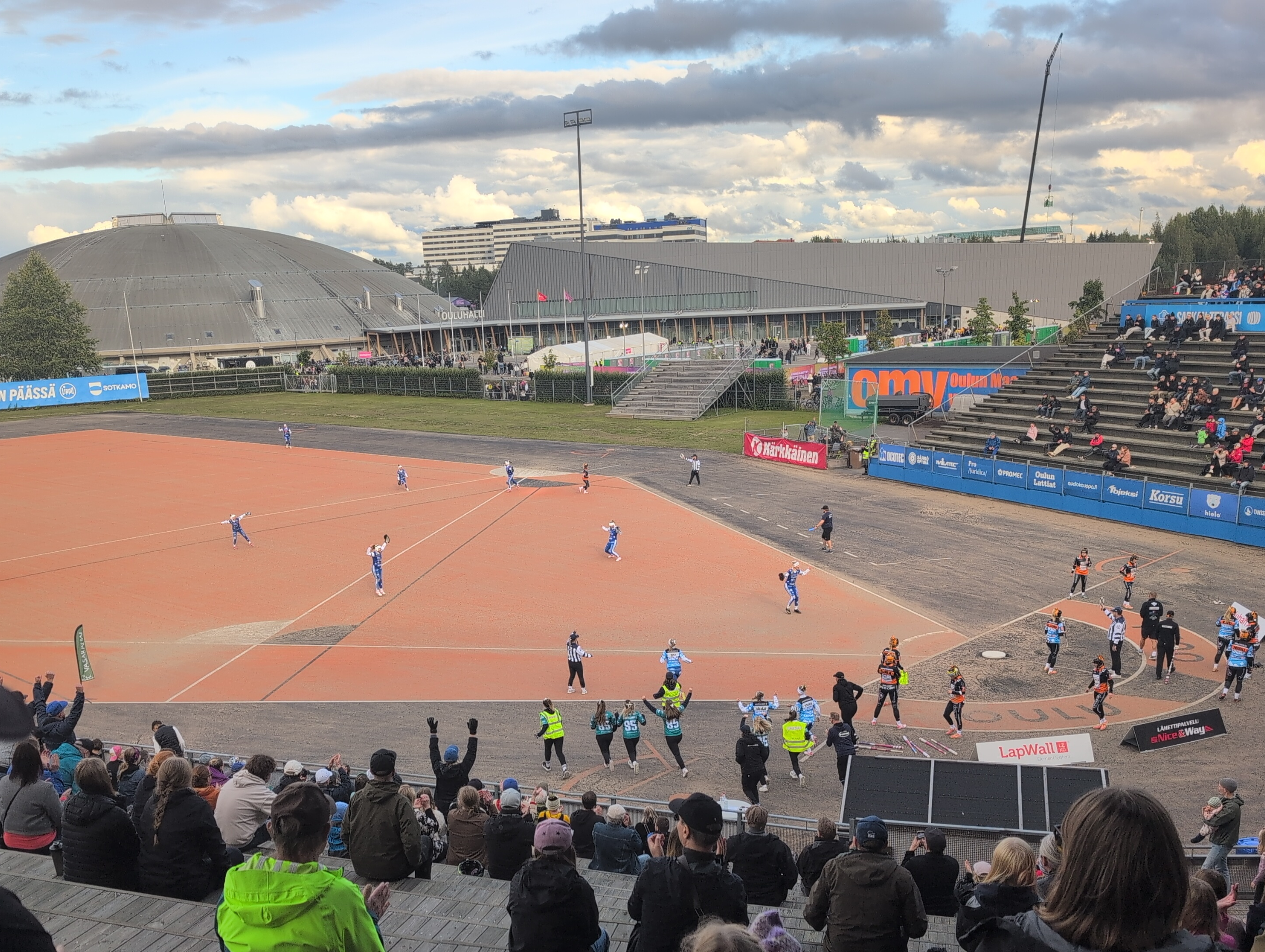
Game 1 of the 2025 women's finals in progress.

As of the 2025 season, it is the only league in the system to have significantly differing league structures in the men's and women's leagues. But as in the rest of the system, there are also small fluctuations in the number of teams, regular season structures, and playoff structures between most seasons.

=== Men's league ===
Men play a single-group regular season with 24 matches each. In the play-offs, the top 2 receive a bye to the semi-finals, while the teams placed 3rd through 6th play in the quarterfinals. The final is played best-of-5, while the semifinals and quarterfinals are played best-of-3.

The playoff champion is promoted directly to Superpesis. The finals series loser enters a best-of-5 promotion/relegation playoff against the winner of a play-out between the bottom 2 in Superpesis. The winners are promoted to (or remain in) Superpesis.

The bottom 4 in the regular season play in play-outs: Lowest against 4th-lowest, and 2nd-lowest against 3rd-lowest. The winners remain in Ykköspesis, while the losers are relegated to Suomensarja.

=== Women's league ===
Women play across two conferences, a northern conference (Pohjoislohko) and a southern conference (Etelälohko). In the regular season, the teams play 23 or 24 matches each.

The top 4 teams in each conference go to the playoffs. The quarterfinals are intra-conference, and the team that placed 1st plays against the team that placed 4th, while the 2nd-placed plays against the 3rd-placed. The semifinals and final are inter-conference. All playoff matches are best-of-3.

The team that place 9th in the northern conference is directly relegated to Suomensarja. The teams that placed 7th and 8th in each conference play intra-conference play-out series. The winners remain in Ykköspesis, while the losers are relegated to Suomensarja.
