= Pesäpallo =

Finnish bat-and-ball sport

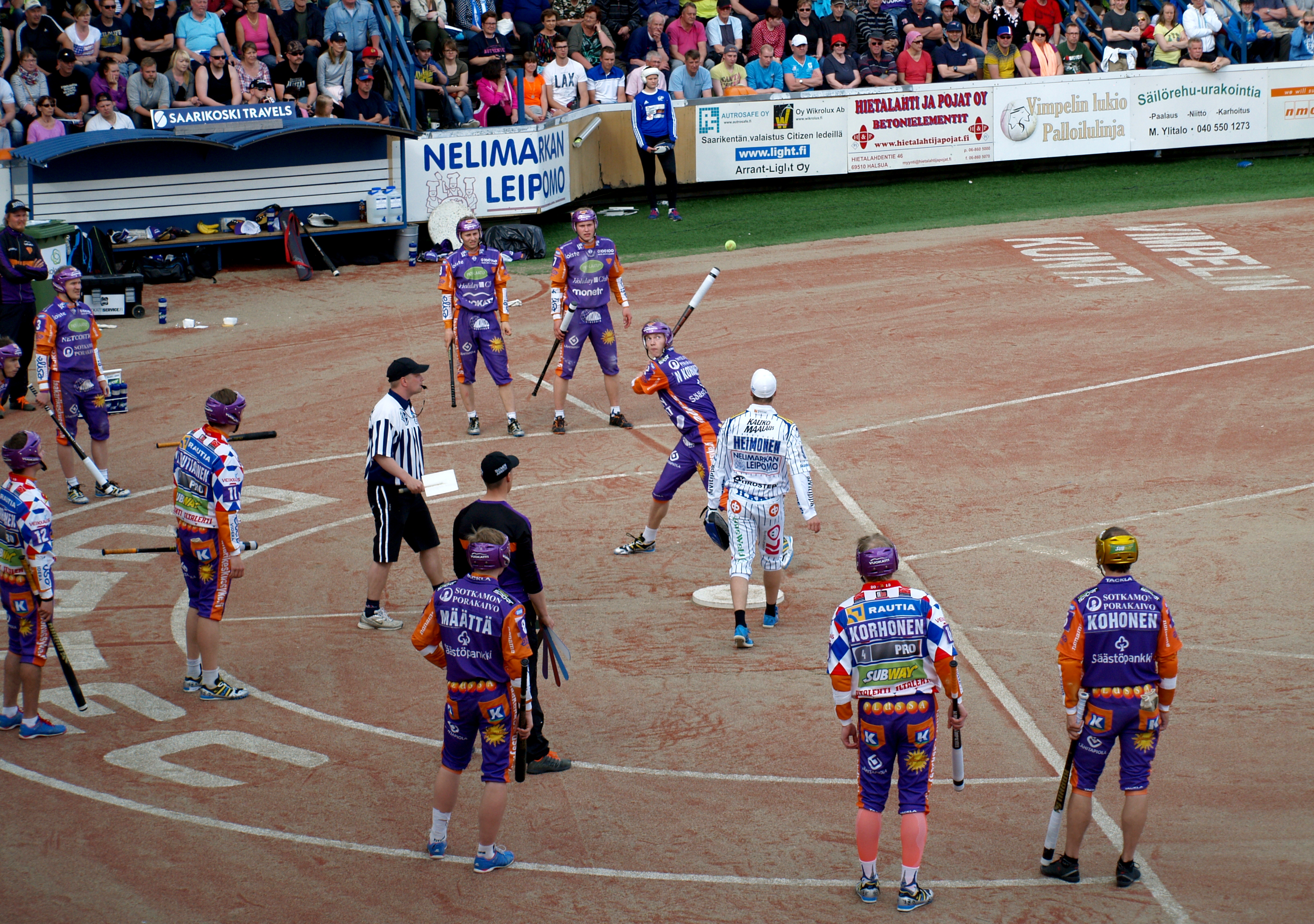
- Veto against Jymy in 2015.
- First played: 1920; 106 years ago, Finland, Helsinki
- Registered players: World Pesäpallo Federation (WPF)

Characteristics
- Team members: 9 (on defense); 12 (on offense)
- Type: Bat-and-ball
- Equipment: Ball, bat, gloves, helmet, pitching plate

Presence
- Olympic: Demonstrated in 1952
- World Games: Invitational in 1997

Pesäpallo (Finnish pronunciation: [ˈpesæˌpɑlːo]; lit. 'nest ball'; Swedish: Boboll, colloquially known in Finnish as pesis and also referred to as Finnish baseball) is a fast-moving bat-and-ball sport that is often referred to as the national sport of Finland and has some presence in other places including Germany, Sweden, Switzerland, Australia, and Canada's northern Ontario (the latter two countries have significant Nordic populations). It is similar to brännboll, rounders, lapta, and baseball.

The basic idea of pesäpallo is similar to that of baseball: the offense tries to score by hitting the ball successfully and running through the bases, while the defense tries to put the batter and runners out. One of the most important differences between pesäpallo and baseball is that the ball is pitched vertically, which makes hitting the ball, as well as controlling the power and direction of the hit, much easier. This gives the offensive game more variety, speed, and tactical aspects compared to baseball. The fielding team is forced to counter the batter's choices with defensive schemes and anticipation.

The manager has an important role in pesäpallo, leading the offense by giving signals to the players using a multicoloured fan. The defensive team play is directed by the manager's orders and hand signals by the fielders.

== History ==
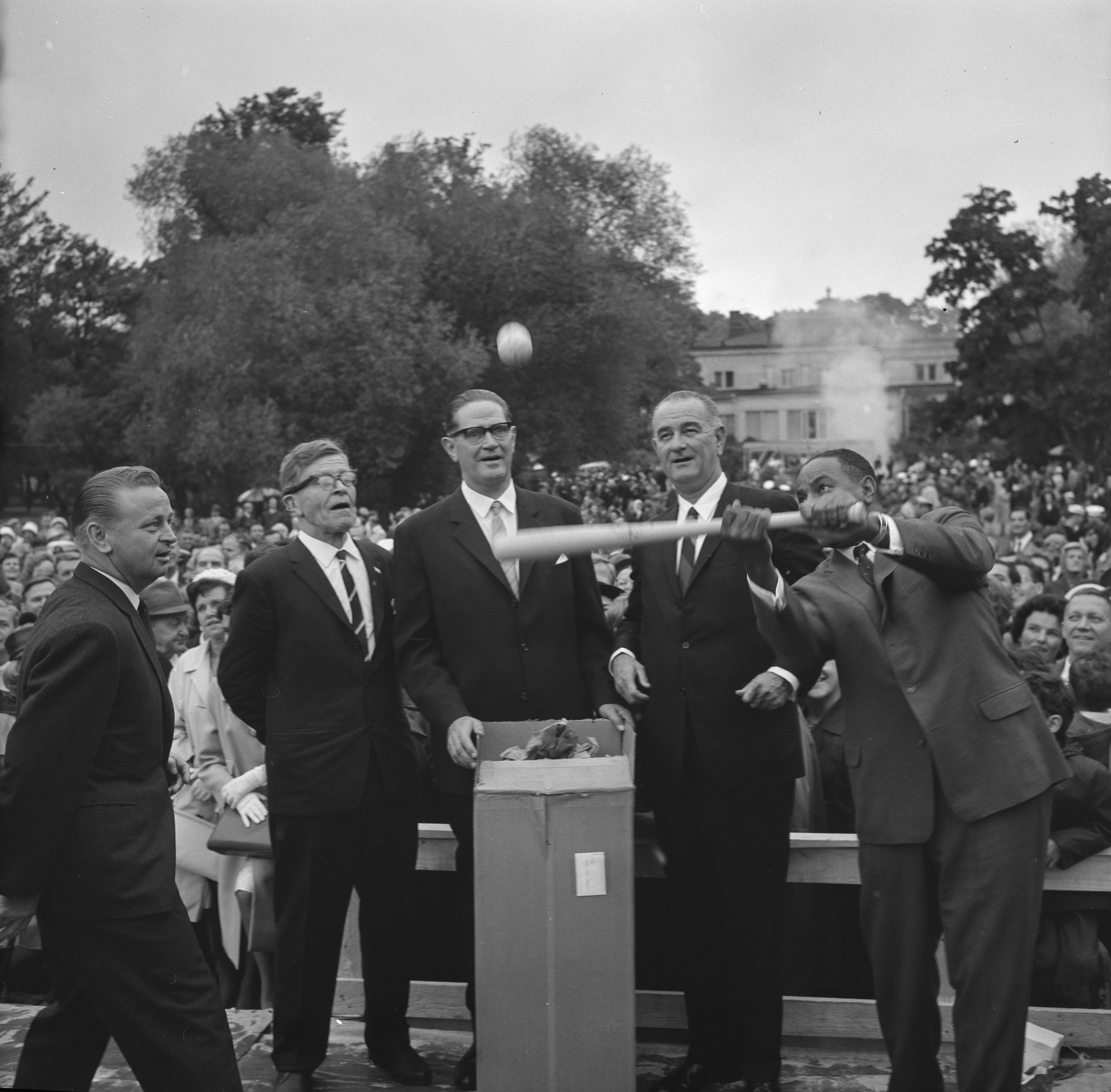
US Vice President Lyndon B. Johnson's visit in 1963. US Ambassador to Finland Carl Rowan (right) hits the ball with a baseball bat and a founder of Pesäpallo Lauri Pihkala (left) in Kaivopuisto, Helsinki

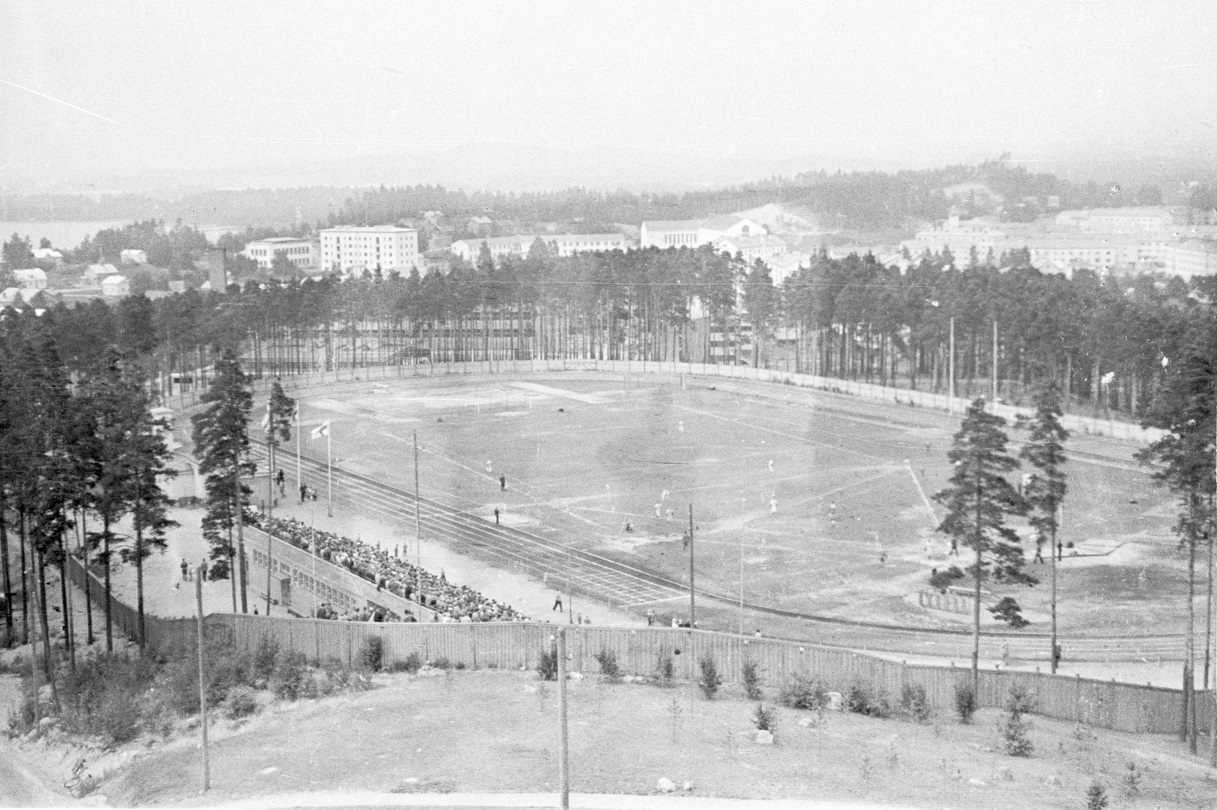
Pesäpallo match in 1955 in Harjun stadion

Pesäpallo, a combination of traditional ball-batting team games and North American baseball, was invented by Lauri "Tahko" Pihkala in the 1920s. It has changed with the times and grown in popularity. On 14 November 1920, it was played the first time at Kaisaniemi Park in Helsinki. Pesäpallo was a demonstration sport at the 1952 Summer Olympics, held in Helsinki, Finland.

The main leagues began to be called Superpesis in 1990, and they were also heavily marketed. Veikkaus introduced pesäpallo's sports betting to Finland in 1993. However, in connection with this, pesäpallo was plunged into the biggest crisis in its history due to the 1998 match-fixing scandal.

== World Federation ==
The first Pesäpallo World Cup was held in 1992, but the World Pesäpallo Federation (WPF) was not formed at that time, according to Guinness World Records. The tournament featured seven nations: Finland, Sweden, Australia, Estonia, Germany, Lithuania, and Japan. The World Pesäpallo Federation was established later.

== Rules ==
=== Match format ===
A regular pesäpallo game is played in two periods of four innings each. A period is won by the team which scores the most runs in its offensive half-innings. If a period ends in a tie, there is no tie-breaker and neither team receives a point for that period.

If the periods are tied (If each team wins 1 period each, or both periods are tied), there will be an extra (9th) inning; if needed, there is a round (similar to a penalty shootout) where the teams start with a runner on third base and try to get a score from that runner.

During an inning, both teams take turns playing offense (batting) and defense (fielding).

The offensive team can continue batting until three players have been put out or one round of the batting order has been completed without at least two runs scored. The batter and the pitcher face each other at the home base, on opposite sides of the circular plate; so that if a batter is right-handed, the pitcher stands on the right, and vice versa. The pitch is delivered by throwing the ball directly upwards above the plate, at least 1 meter over the head of the pitcher.

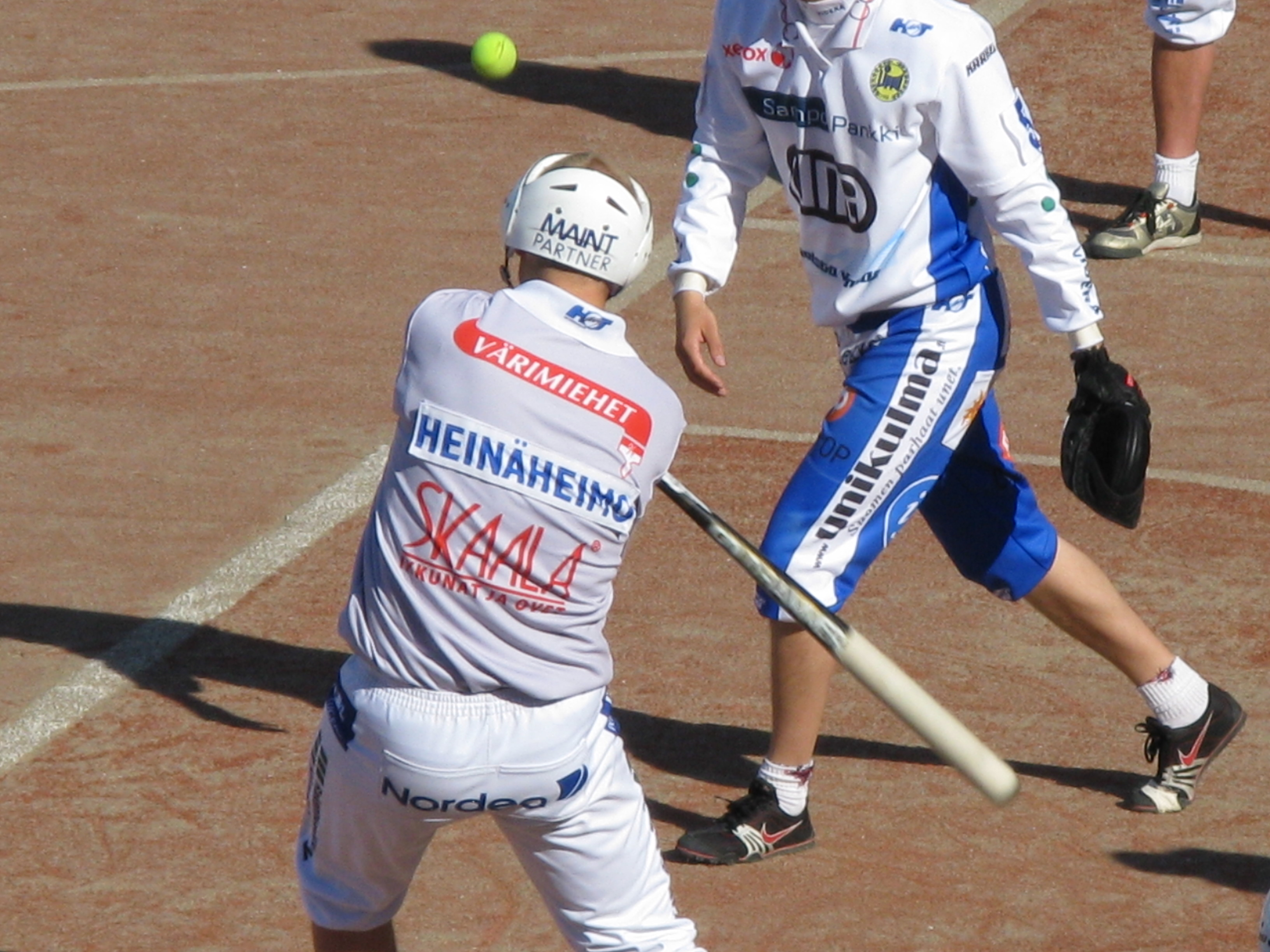
Batter hitting the ball

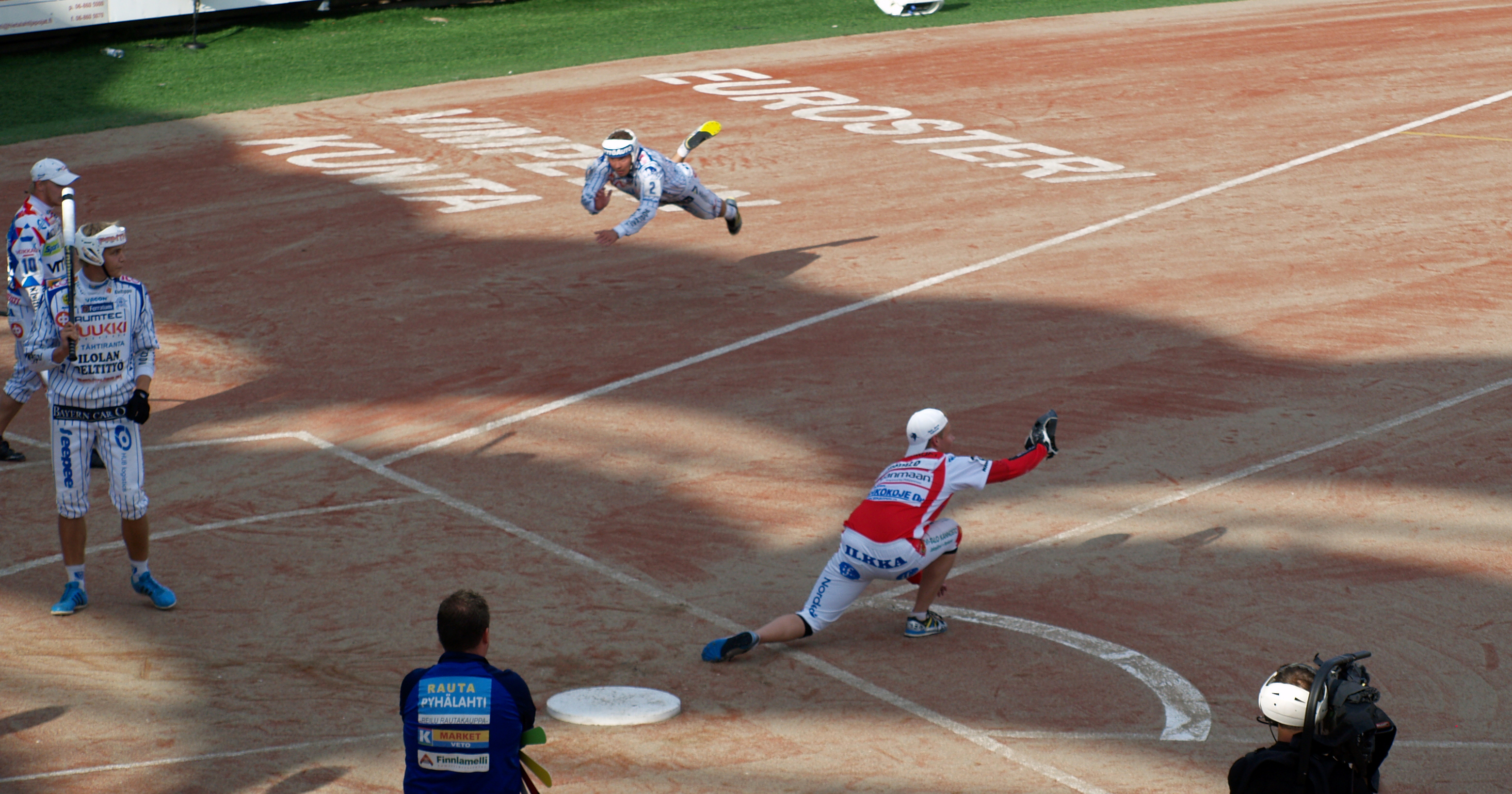
Pesäpallo player on offence diving towards base.

Both teams have a pelinjohtaja, lit. a game leader or more simply, a team's manager. The captain of the team – one of the players – tries to beat the other team's captain in the hutunkeitto (lit. 'porridge making ("boiling of porridge")'), where the captains take turns holding the bat increasingly higher up, with the umpire constantly checking if the hand positions are valid. The one who first gets contact on the top of the bat in a valid position wins, and gets to choose whether to start on offence or defence.

=== Offense ===
The team playing the offensive half has nine batters, and three additional batters known as jokers (Named for the playing card and resembles designated hitters). Whereas ordinary batters must bat in a pre-designated batting order, the joker batters are allowed to enter the order at any point.

Today, players strategy-wise usually have a specialised role in the batting order depending on their abilities. Fast runners are usually positioned first in the batting order, after which come players who specialize in advancing runners between bases. Next comes a player specializing in scoring runners home. Players from 6 to 9 often form another attacking combination. The jokers are usually a selection of either batting jokers (good hitters specializing in scoring) or runner jokers (fast runners specializing in advancing in the field).

The batter has three strikes available during their turn at bat. A fair hit does not require the batter to reach base; all three strikes can be used before the batter must reach first base. A pitch counts as a strike if the batter takes a swing at the ball and the umpire rules the pitch legal. When a batter makes a fair hit, unless it is the third strike, the batter does not have to try to advance safely to the first base. However, if the batter hits a foul ball on the third strike and does not try to advance, only that player is out and the runners continue with the next batter.

The batter can also try to steal first base on a foul pitch.

If the pitcher delivers one single bad pitch (Ball), the batter is granted a walk to the first base if there are no runners on base. If there are runners on any base, the first bad pitch to a specific hitter is unpunished, but the point runner (the runner at the highest-numbered base) is granted a walk to the next base for the second and all consecutive bad pitches pitched for the same hitter. A pitch can be ruled as foul for various reasons, most common ones being that the ball does not fall on the plate or that the pitch is not thrown high enough.

A hit is a foul ball if the ball first touches the field outside of the main area; the batter or the runners cannot advance on a foul ball.

Players generally have little difficulty hitting the ball, so the main target is not just hitting the ball but selecting a suitable type of hit and directing it correctly. There are many different types of hits used, here are a few examples:

- Snap (short) hit ("Näpy" or "Näppi"): Normally used for advancing fast runners between bases, aimed to avoid defensive players. Usually hit in such way that the ball takes a hard spin.
- Fly hit ("Koppilyönti"): An intentional high hit to be caught, often used to give way for faster runners.
- High drive ("Kupperi" or "Kumura"): Aimed to drop to the field between midfield and outfield, with a top spin. Excellent for scoring.
- Bouncer ("Pomppu"): Used for advancing fast runners, hit downwards very hard to be bounced right next to the front arc, somewhat similar to a bunt. Aimed towards the base that a runner is leaving, or to the centre. Technically very hard to perform, used only by advanced players.
- Standard bunt, though this is risky if the pitcher expects this to happen and catches the bunt before it hits the ground.

The runner reaches safety on a base by touching the base area before the ball is thrown to a fielder in the base. If the ball gets to the base first, the runner is out and is removed from the field. The batter is also out if the third strike is a foul ball. A runner on a base is forced to advance if the next runner reaches safety on the same base.

The offensive team scores a run when a runner returns safely to the home base after advancing through all three field bases. If a batter advances to the third base on their batted ball, it is a "home run". The player can then stay on the third base and try to score again as a regular runner by reaching the home base on a later play.

=== Defense ===
The defensive team has nine players on the field at a time.

The pitcher is positioned at the home base. A catcher plays in the infield by the second base. Each of the three bases has its baseman and an additional two shortstops playing close to the second and third bases. Two outfielders cover the outfield. Players can switch their places and position themselves to the field wherever they want. Different positioning is used in different situations, when the defensive team can expect a certain type of hit. This is usually determined by the location of the offensive team's point runner. Special tactics could even be made against a certain batter.

As in baseball, pitchers can throw directly to first base to try to tag out a runner.

If a pitcher and an offence player in the batting order agree to do so, they can initiate a second offence runner from home plate while the previous batter is still a runner.

If a fielder catches the ball before it reaches the ground, the hit is a "catch", and all runners who tried to advance on that play are caught. Players who have been caught are removed from the field, but they do not count as outs.

== Playing field ==
Men's pesäpallo field

The infield is pentagonal, 96 metres (315 ft) long and 42 metres (138 ft) wide at its widest, and the ball must bounce at least once in the infield to be a valid fair hit. When it has bounced once, it may then go over a line (and even leave the field entirely if the field is not fully fenced) and still be in play.

The back line on the fly counts as a laiton (literally "illegal", a foul ball). The foul lines are also on the sides and the front of the field. So if a player aims high and hits a very hard hit that would be a certain home run in baseball, it is counted as a foul in pesäpallo. This increases the tactical approach. All home runs, therefore, are the "inside-the-park" variety even if they end up leaving the field.

The outfield consists of everything that is fenced in on the playing field's lot, including bodies of water at Vimpelin Veto, and balls going underneath the fences at Sotkamon Jymy. The fields' dimensions vary dramatically: The distance to centre field fencing in the men's Superpesis vary from 109 metres (358 ft) at Kiteen Pallo -90, to 168 metres (551 ft) at Seinäjoen JymyJussit.

The playing fields are most commonly various mixtures of thin dirt comparable to tennis clay courts, sand, and sometimes artificial turf, for instance at Pesäkarhut. Normal grass is typically only seen near the outer fences.

Due to the unusual field surfaces and dimensions, there are no dedicated multi-purpose stadiums among the highest levels' home fields, neither with association football, international baseball, or otherwise. Guest destination matches in the Superpesis are usually played on dedicated association football pitches with all-artificial turf, but are not the main home fields of any significant teams.

== Differences from baseball ==
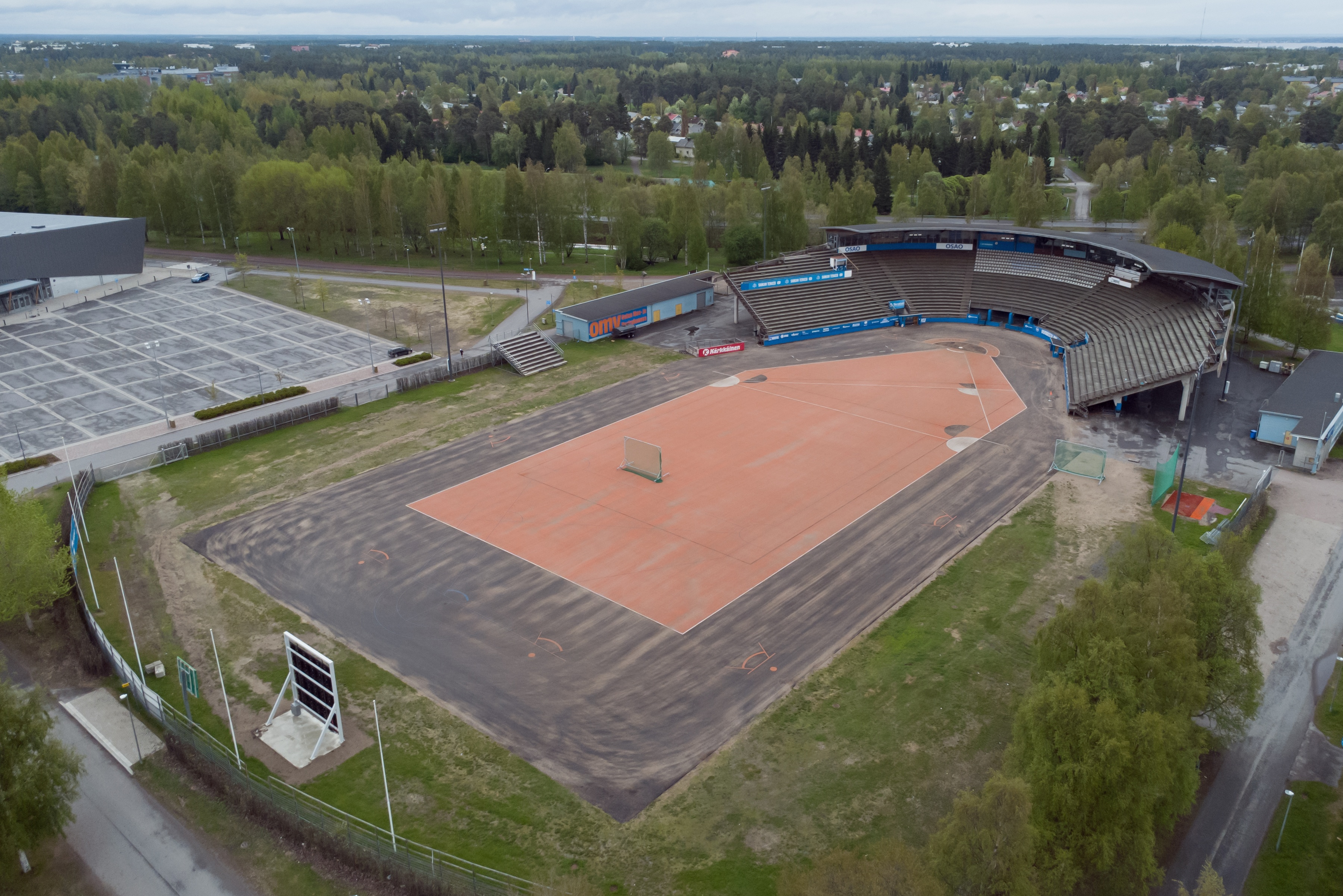
Empty pesäpallo field in Oulu.

Besides the info on ball movements and infields listed elsewhere on the page, summaries of the most significant differences from baseball are:

- Balls leaving the field on the fly is a foul ball and not a home run.
- Instead of a "batter's box", the home plate serves as a pitching plate, which is round with a diameter of 60 centimetres (24 in). All other batting team players stand in a semicircle near the batter.
- Walking requires fewer invalid pitches: one if bases are empty, two otherwise, and the walk is granted to the runner on the highest numbered base.
- A fair hit does not force the batter to advance; the batter can use all three strikes at bat before they become a runner.
- "Force outs" are always outs: if the runner is off the base and the ball is in the control of a defensive player at the next base, the runner is out (unless the runner is returning to their original base after a foul ball)
- The bases are not laid in a diamond shape; the players have to 'zig zag' the court (see chart).
- When entering a base, the runner only has to cross the line of the base; there are no actual cushion bases like in baseball, only lines on the field showing each base's boundaries (A much larger area compared to the bases used in baseball). Similarly, the pitcher or the fielders in the bases do not have any plates to touch to make an out; having only a foot in the base is enough.
- The attacking team uses a colour-coded fan to signal the runners when to move. The fan is multicoloured, held by the coach of the team. Colour sequence is decided prior to the game.
- Runners will much more often dive head-first towards the next bases, instead of sliding leg-first.
- As in most non-baseball sports, it is possible for the home team to have to bat first depending on the pre-match hutunkeitto procedure.

== Equipment ==
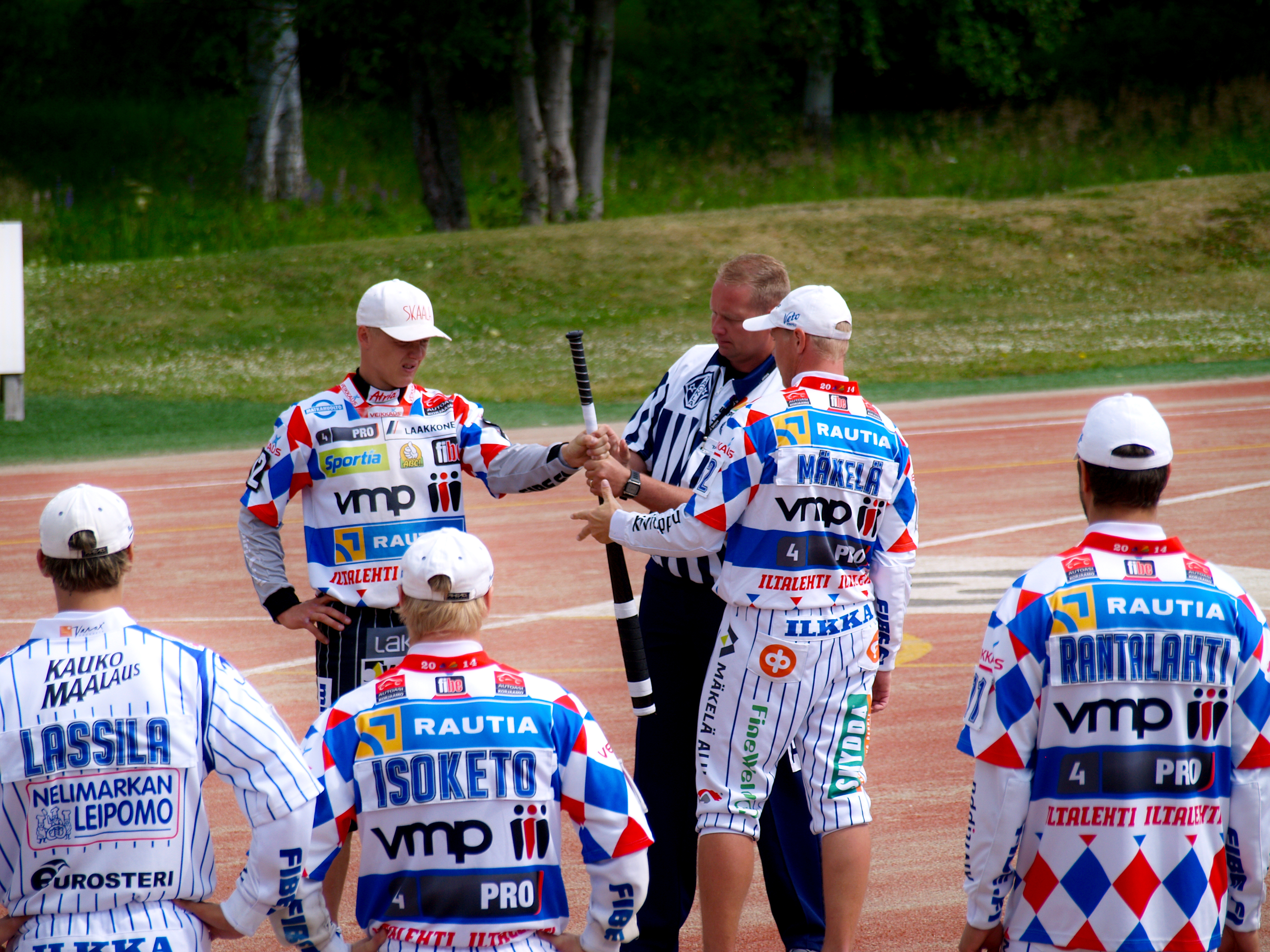
Before the start of the match, the turns are drawn with a traditional "hutunkeitto"

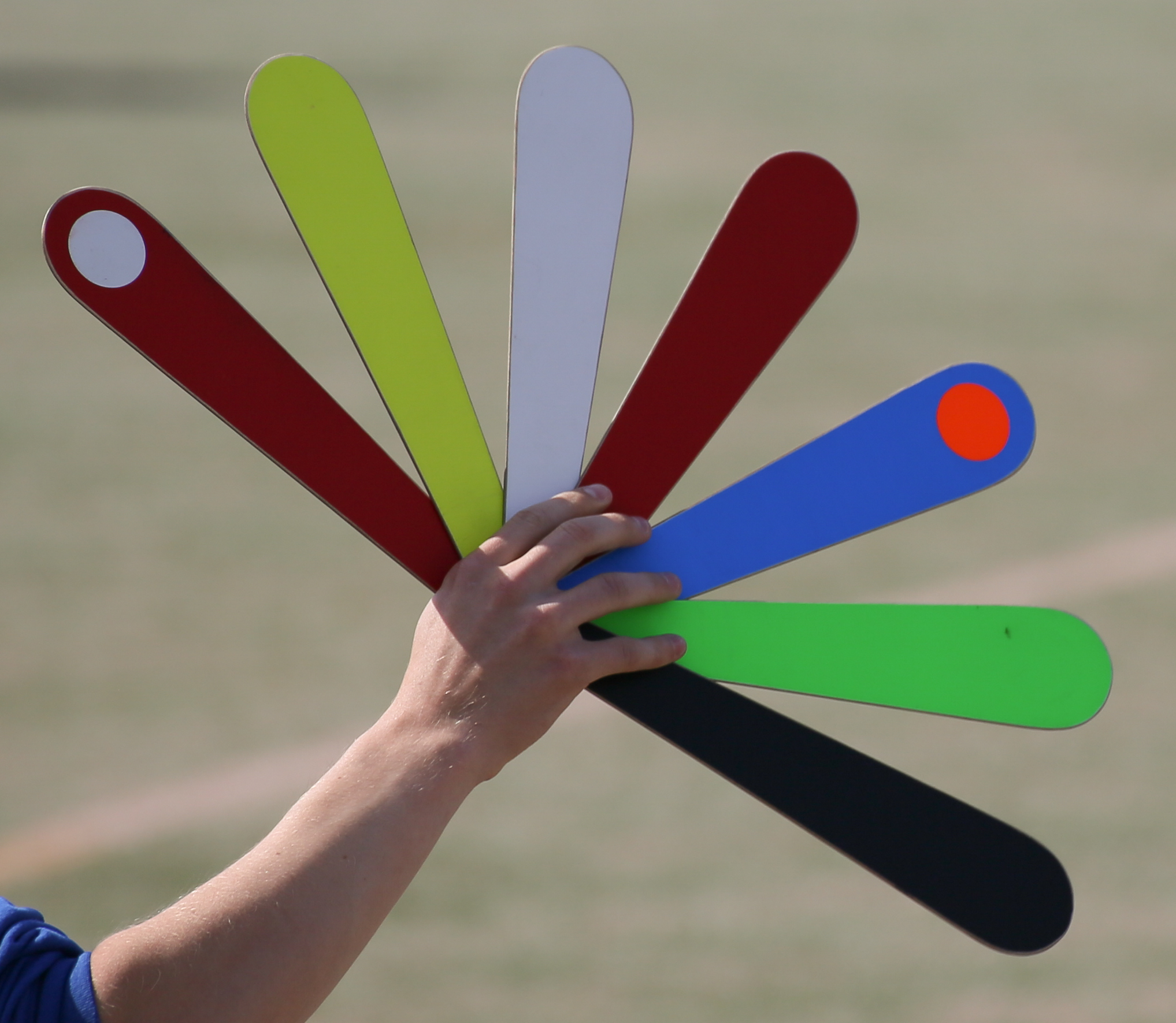
Pesäpallo sign fan (merkkiviuhka)

=== Helmet ===
Each player is required to wear a helmet when playing in an offensive inning. If a player sets at bat without a helmet an out can be marked for the team. Apart from the pitcher and the outfielders, fielders are required to wear helmets. Such helmet requirements were introduced following the death of Saaren Urheilijat player Jari Kettunen in 1985 after being struck in the head by a ball.

=== Glove ===
The glove is used to ease catching the ball when playing on defence. The glove used in pesäpallo differs from the one used in baseball both in characteristics and in appearance, resembling more an ice hockey goaltender's glove. The glove is made of leather, although some manufacturers use different kinds of synthetic fibers on the back side. The inside of the glove is always made of thick leather and the main differences between gloves lie in the amount and quality of padding, the thickness of the leather, the size of the glove and its shaping.

The ball is caught into the glove's cup between the thumb and the index finger. Sometimes, however, the ball hits the palm and a properly designed glove can prevent injuries.

Other devices to catch the ball are not allowed.

=== Bat ===
The bat is a round, tapered cylinder. Previously the bats used in pesäpallo were made of wood. These were fairly brittle and did not last very long when used to hit such a heavy ball. Now, wooden bats are only used in children's matches and the bats used in adults' matches are made of a mixture of glass fiber and carbon fiber.

The biggest differences between bats lie in the weight, centre of gravity, flexibility and length. The maximum length of the bat is 100 centimetres (39 in). When using a children's ball the maximum length of the bat is 90 centimetres (35 in).

The weight of the bat is considered to be its most important property. A typical bat used in top competitions weighs 580–620 grams (20–22 oz). The heaviest bats weigh more than 650 grams (23 oz) but these are only used by strong players like batting jokers. Junior players typically use bats that weigh less than 400 grams (14 oz). The usual diameter for the bat's hitting point is 56 millimetres (2.2 in).

=== Spikes ===
The use of spiked shoes—like in running—is not required to play pesäpallo. However, they do help the player substantially in rapid situations, especially when playing on modern artificial grass fields with some sand, which are very slippery to ordinary sport shoes. The artificial turf differs from what is used on football fields.

There are only a few manufacturers producing spikes designed for pesäpallo and many players use normal running spikes. Some shoes have also spikes at the heel but mostly spikes are positioned under the ball of the foot. Usually there are seven spikes in a shoe and they are 3–15 millimeters long. When playing on artificial turf the maximum length of spikes is 6 millimeters.

=== Ball ===
The ball used in pesäpallo is yellow and has a circumference of 21.60–22.20 centimetres (8.50–8.74 in). They strongly resemble tennis balls but are heavier. The weight of the ball varies by series:

- Men's ball: 160–165 grams (5.6–5.8 oz)
- Women's ball: 135–140 grams (4.8–4.9 oz)
- Junior ball: 95–100 grams (3.4–3.5 oz)
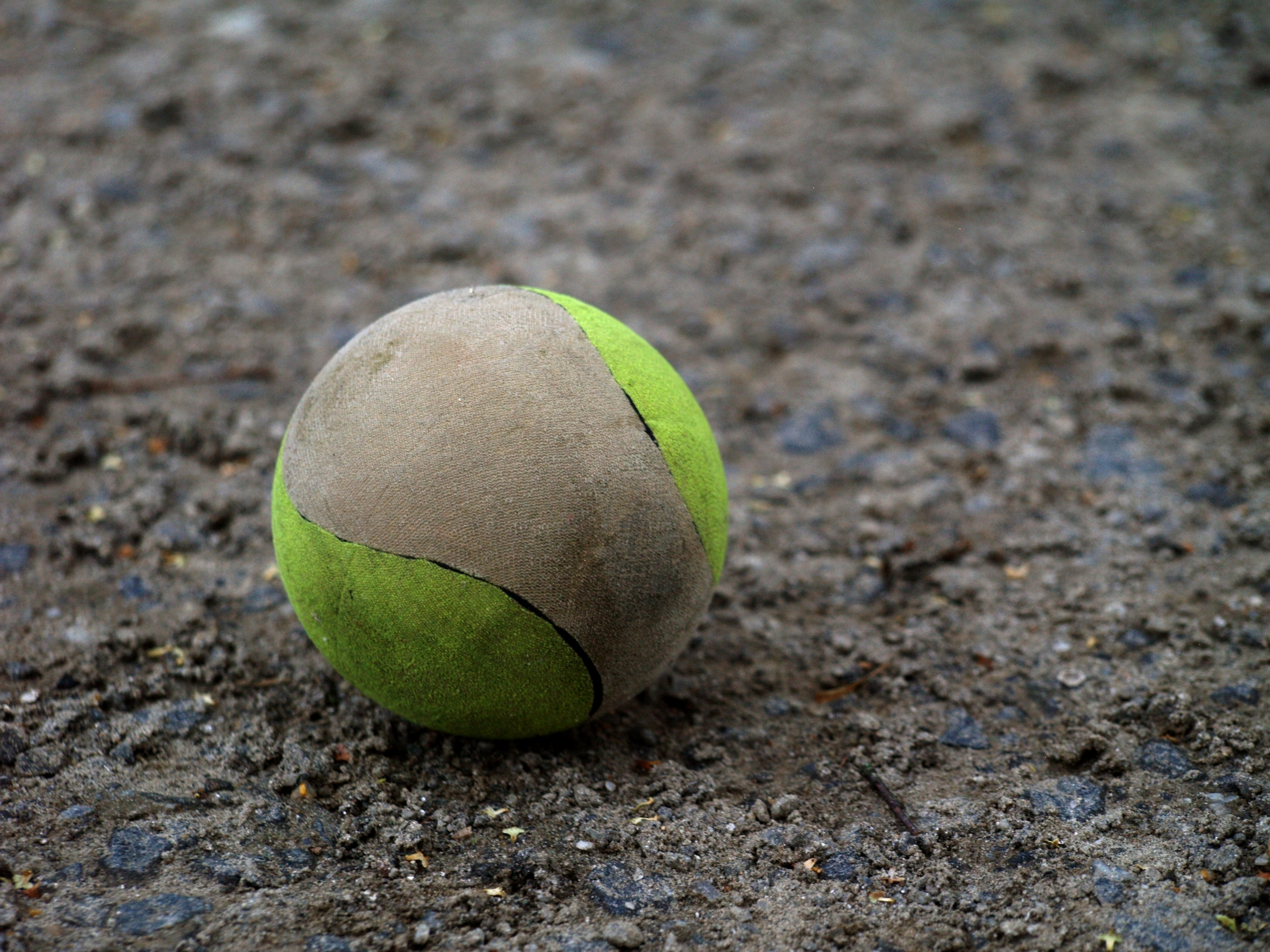
Pesäpallo ball

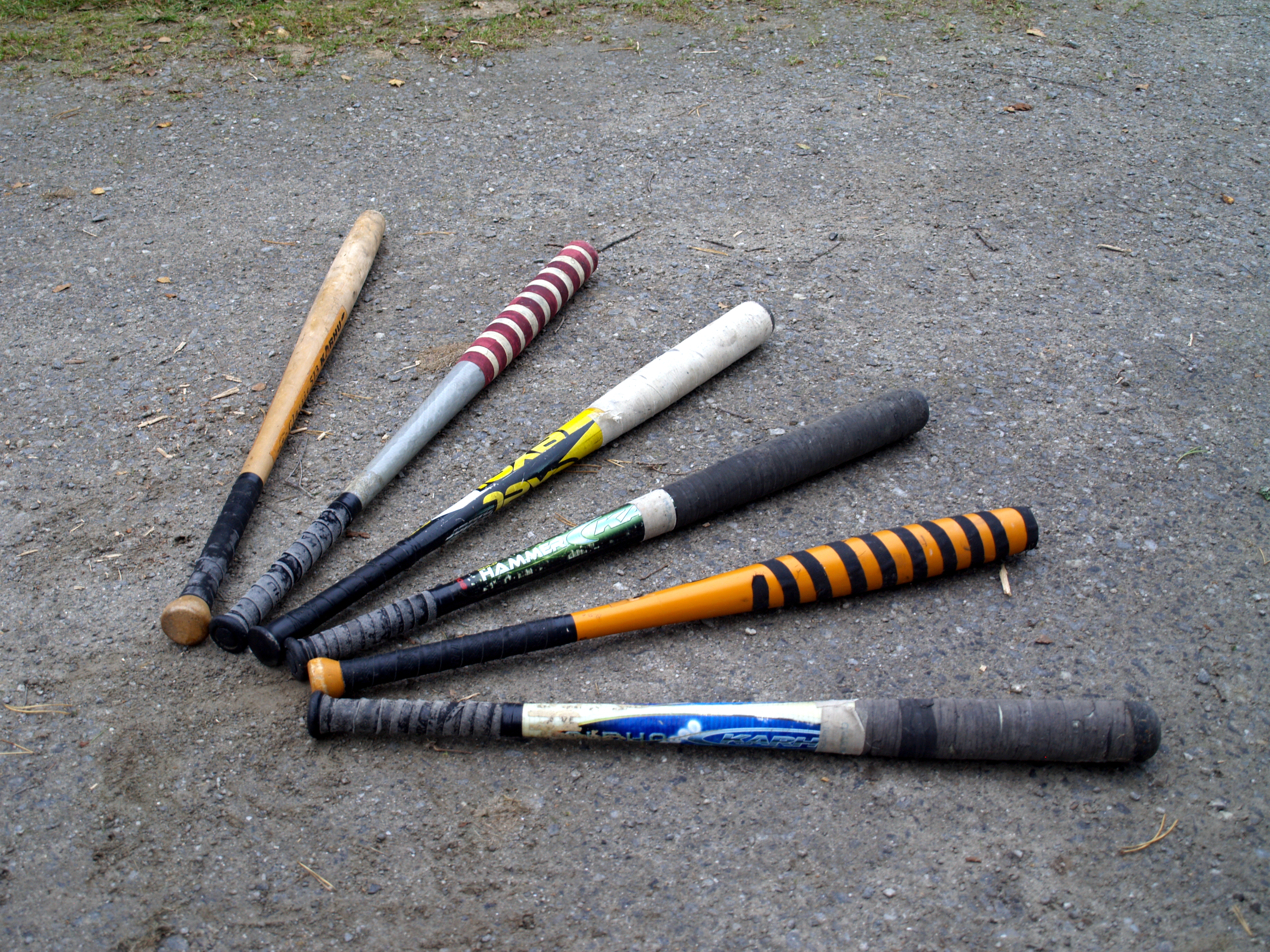
Pesäpallo bats

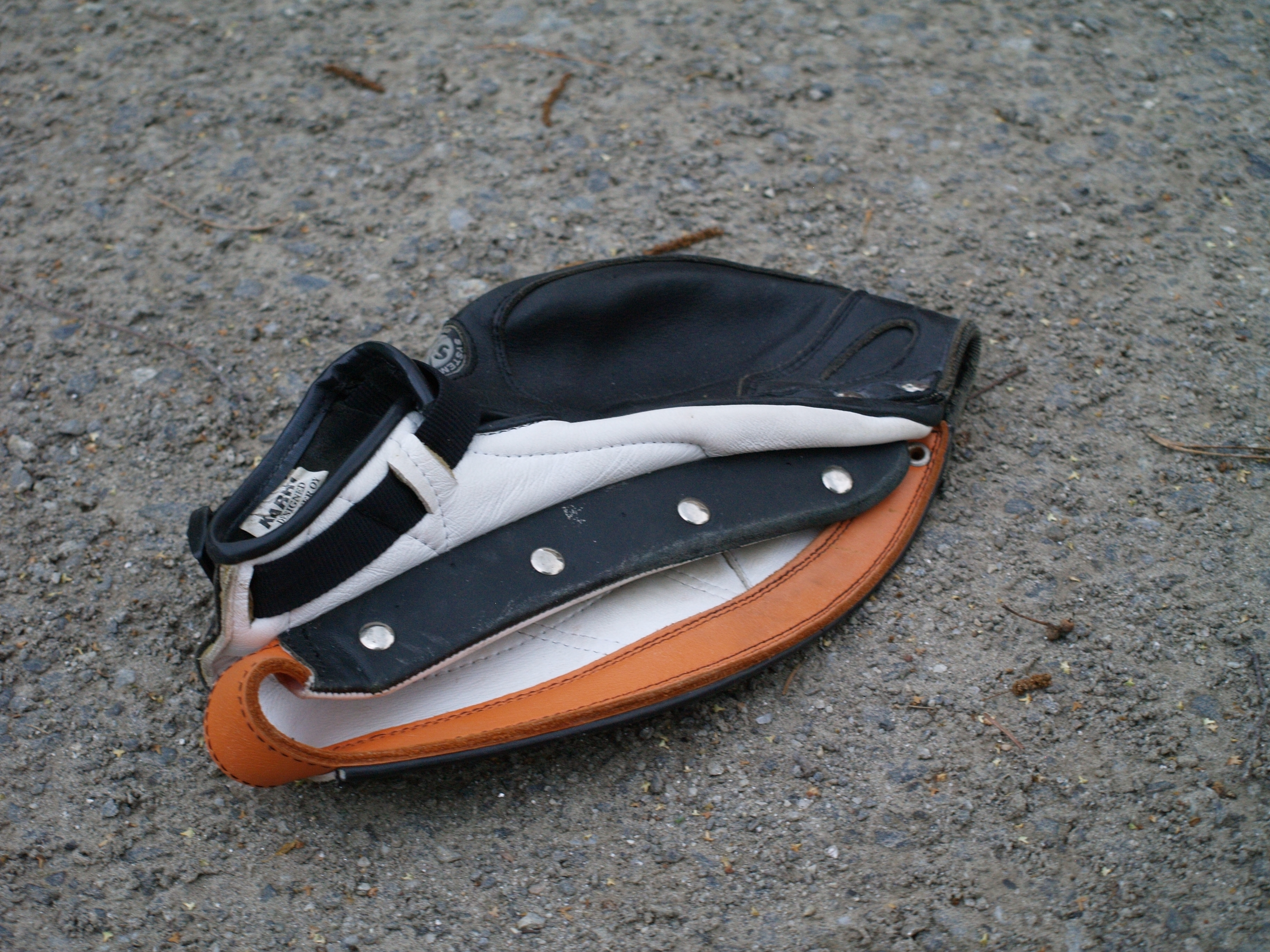
Pesäpallo glove

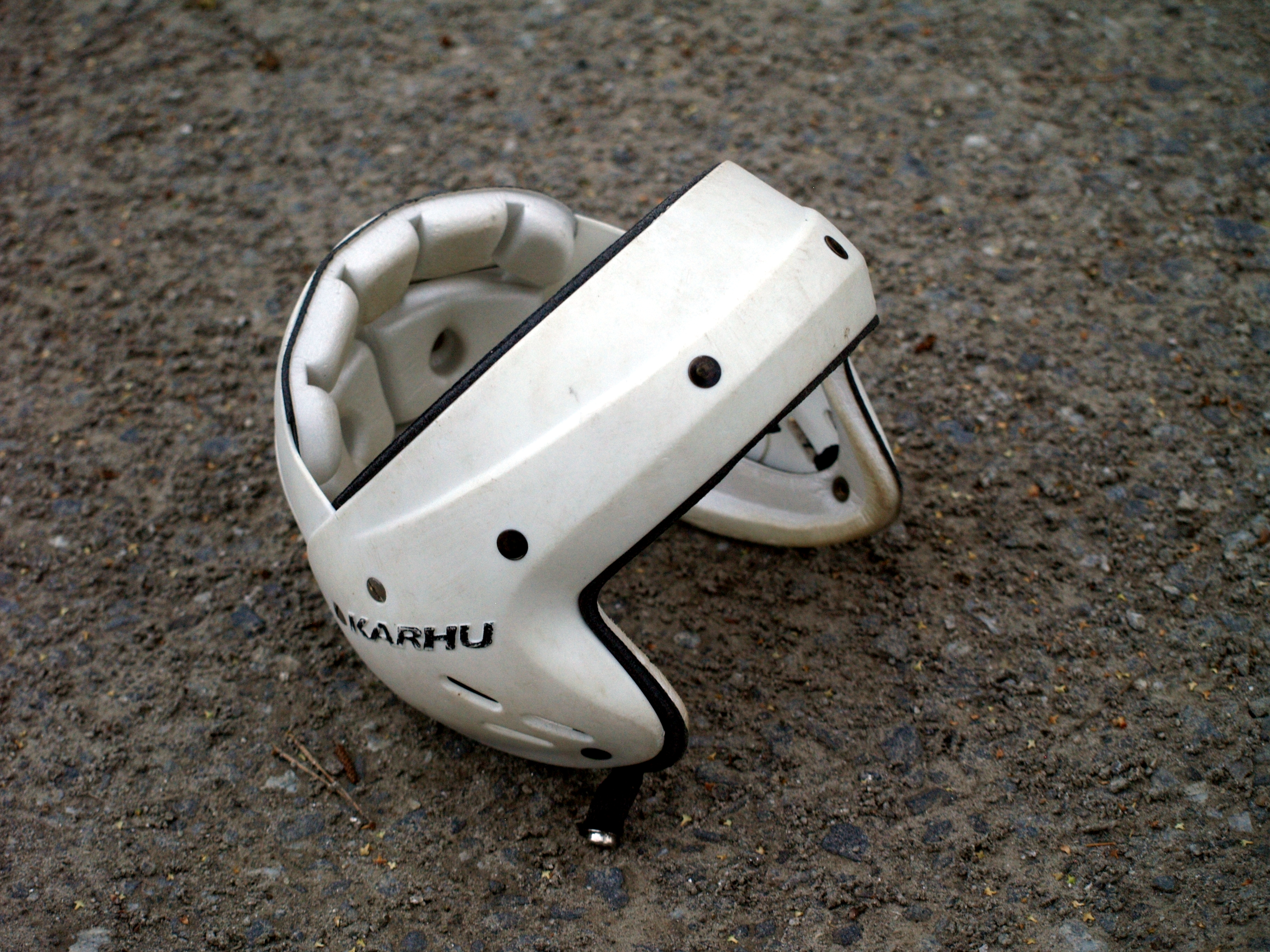
Pesäpallo helmet

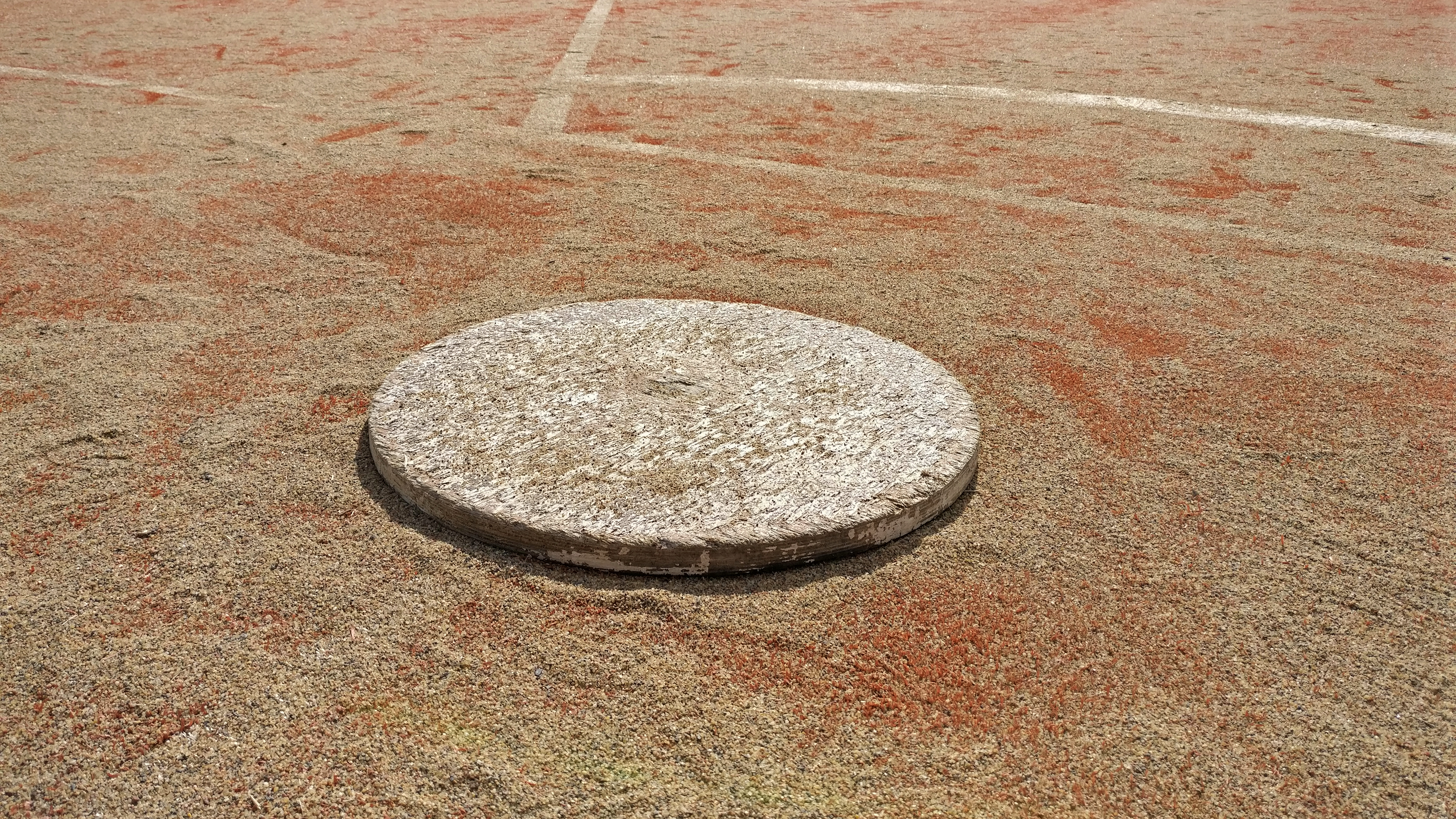
Pesäpallo pitching plate

== Competing ==
unofficial Pesäpallo pictogram

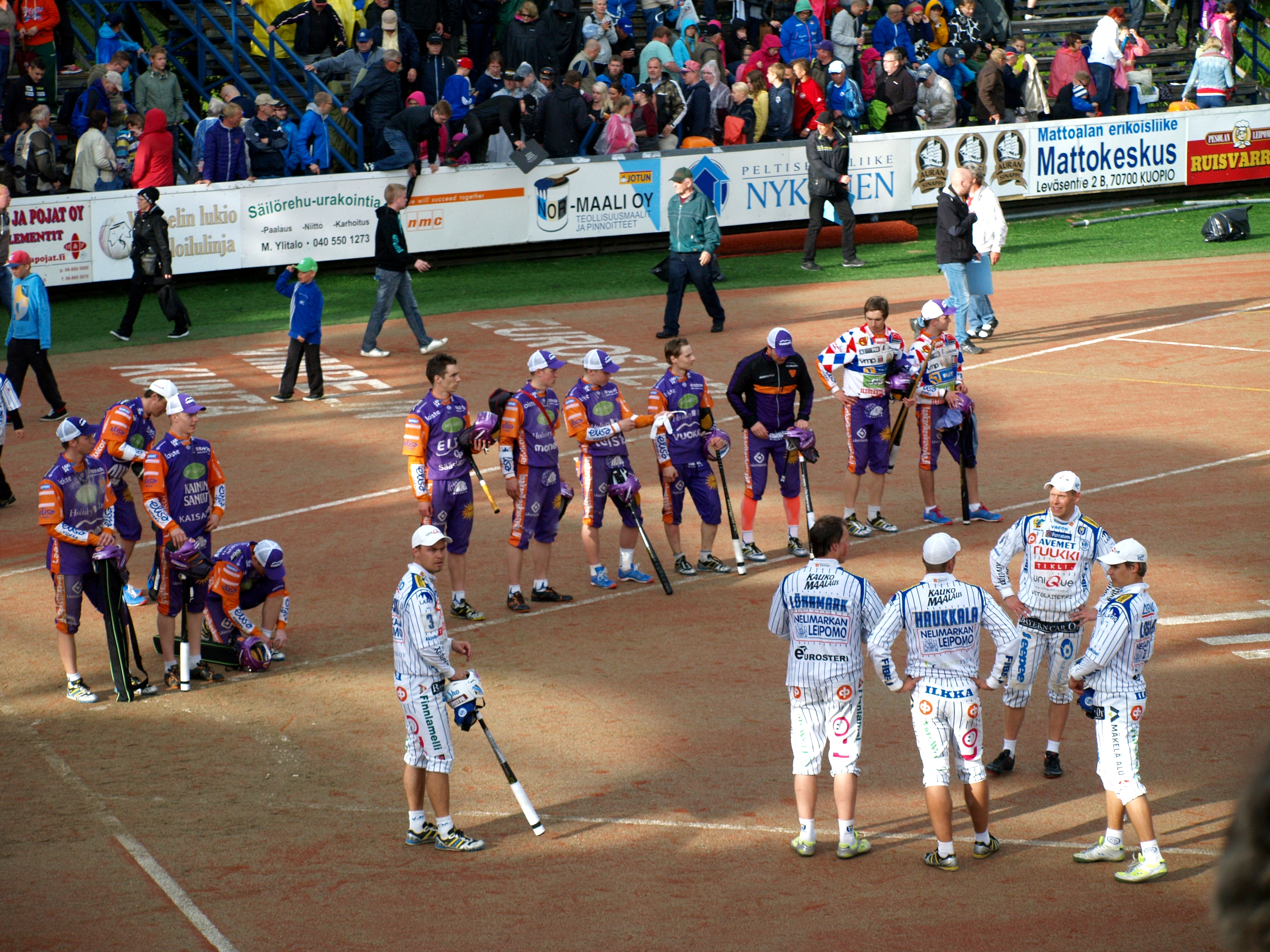
The 2015 Superpesis match between Sotkamon Jymy (purple-orange) and Vimpelin Veto (white) at Saarikenttä Stadium in Vimpeli, Finland

The Finnish top league in the league system is known as Superpesis. Both men and women compete in their own series. The second tier is known as Ykköspesis, the third tier consists of interregional leagues known as Suomensarja, and the fourth tier consists of provincial leagues known as Maakuntasarja. The exact number of teams and groups in each tier varies slightly from year to year, and there are usually slight differences between the numbers in the men's and women's league systems.

Level	Division	
1	Superpesis; 12~14 teams ↓ 0-2 relegation spots + 1 relegation play-off spot	
2	Ykköspesis	
2	(Miesten Ykköspesis, men); ~12 teams ↑ 0-2 promotion spots + 1 promotion play-off spot ↓ 2 relegation spots	(Naisten Ykköspesis, women); ~17 teams across 2 groups ↑ 0-2 promotion spots + 1 promotion play-off spot ↓ 2~3 relegation spots
3	Suomensarja (pesäpallo); 37~41 teams across 4~5 groups ↑ 2~3 promotion spots ↓ 4~5 relegation spots	
4	Maakuntasarja (pesäpallo); 50~55 teams across 6~7 groups ↑ 4~5 promotion spots ↓ Relegation possibilities unclear	
5	Pesäpallon aluesarjat Varies, depending on how many teams that pay the entry fees	

As the main leagues use promotion and relegation, there are no minor leagues as such, but the biggest teams field reserve teams in the regular league system, which can be promoted to up to Tier 2.

An open cup called Pesäpallon Suomen Cup was played alongside the various series from 1969-1992.

An annual east-west all-star game called Itä–Länsi-ottelu is played annually, usually in June or early July. The senior main matches field Superpesis players, and other matches under that brand are also played among youth players.

The age classes in youth leagues are sorted by alphabet letters. The under-19 junior class is labelled "B", and compete in the national junior top league Nuorten Superpesis (with the boys' league called Poikien Superpesis and the girls' league called Tyttöjen Superpesis). As of the 2025 season, the main national competitions of classes "C" (under-16) and younger are played during annual national summer camps. A designated under-21 "A" class for men also exists but has mostly been phased out, with its last major event as of 2025 being during the 2019 Itä-Länsi-ottelu.

A Pesäpallo World Cup is played internationally every three years. In 2006 the fifth World Cup was played in Munich, Germany. Participant countries included Australia, Finland, Germany and Sweden. The sixth World Cup took place from July 8–11, 2009 in Pori, Finland, with teams from Australia, Finland, Germany, Sweden and Switzerland. The seventh World Cup took place in 2012 on the Gold Coast of Australia. The three teams were Australia, Finland and "Team Europe". The eighth World Cup was played in Lucerne, Switzerland in 2015 featuring Australia, Germany, Finland, and Switzerland.

There are no significant inter-varsity pesäpallo leagues in Finland.

== See also ==
- Superpesis
- Variations of baseball
