= Miro Rahkola =

Finnish ice hockey player

- Born: October 10, 1988 (age 37) Pori, Finland
- Height: 6 ft 3 in (191 cm)
- Weight: 198 lb (90 kg; 14 st 2 lb)
- Position: Defence
- Shoots: Left
- Hockeyettan team Former teams: Varberg Vipers; Ässät; Jokipojat; Drakkars de Caen; TuTo
- Playing career: 2009–present

Miro Rahkola is a Finnish professional ice hockey defenceman who currently plays for the Varberg Vipers of the Swedish Tier 3 league, Hockeyettan.
