= Porilainen =

Sandwich and street food dish in Finnish cuisine

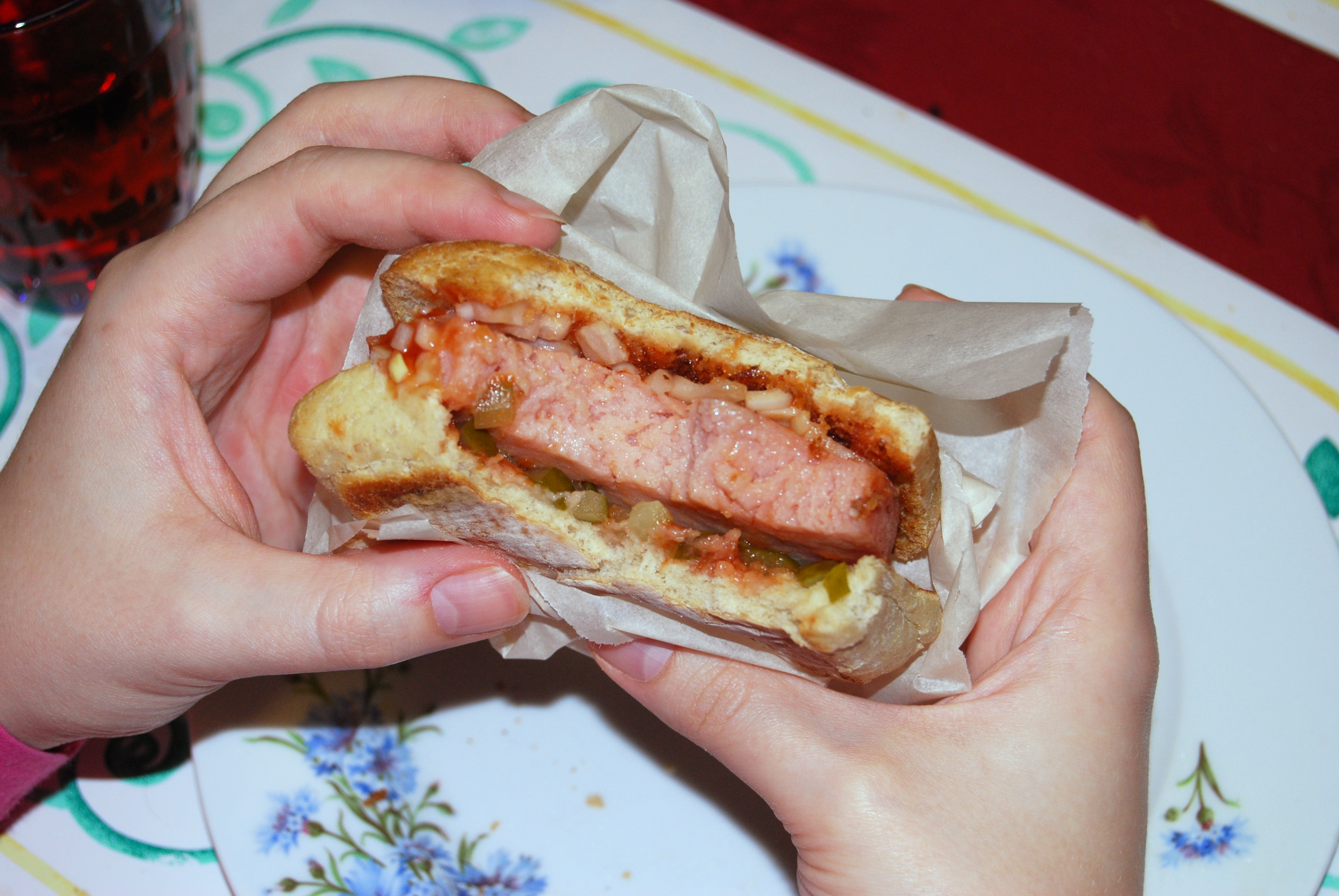
- Type: Sandwich
- Place of origin: Finland
- Main ingredients: White bread, sausage, onions, pickled cucumber, ketchup, mustard

Porilainen (Finnish pronunciation: [ˈpo.ri.lɑi̯.nen]) is a sandwich and street food dish in Finnish cuisine made from white bread and a thick slice of sausage, normally jagdwurst (jahtimakkara). Additional ingredients may include diced sweet onion, pickled cucumber relish, ketchup, mustard, and in some cases mayonnaise or fried egg.

The name porilainen may be a pun on the word purilainen ('burger'). While it literally means "something originating from the city of Pori", the dish was invented in the 1950s by students at Satakuntalainen Osakunta, one of the student nations of the University of Helsinki. Nevertheless, the dish has been adopted by Pori and it is now considered a kind of traditional food of the locality.

== See also ==
- List of sandwiches
