= Satakunta University of Applied Sciences =

Institute of higher education in Satakunta, Finland

Coordinates: 61.493°N 21.725°E

- Satakunnan ammattikorkeakoulu
- Type: Public Osakeyhtiö
- Established: 1997
- Rector: Jari Multisilta
- Faculty: 500
- Students: 6,700
- Location: See Campuses
- Campus: Urban
- Website: www.samk.fi

Satakunta University of Applied Sciences (SAMK; Finnish: Satakunnan ammattikorkeakoulu) is a university of applied sciences in the Satakunta region of Finland. The main campus is located in Pori, with additional campuses in Rauma, Kankaanpää and Huittinen.

Satakunta University of Applied Sciences has more than 6,700 students and over 500 employees. At SAMK you can complete a bachelor's degree in more than 20 degree programmes and a master's degree in more than 10 degree programmes. In addition, there are seven bachelor's degree programmes and one master's degree programme taught in English. Around 1,000 students complete a bachelor's degree each year.

== History ==
=== 1992-2019 ===
SAMK started its activities as a temporary university of applied sciences in the autumn of 1992. The participants in the pilot were seven existing educational institutions from the Satakunta region. Of the 1364 available student places, 729 were from the field of business. Education was provided in four fields in four localities: Pori, Rauma, Huittinen, and Kankaanpää.

In 2003, SAMK had 5,800 full-time students and 700 adult students studying while working. Unlike other universities of applied sciences, SAMK had an enterprise accelerator for students, not a business incubator for graduates.

Since January 2012, Satakunta University of Applied Sciences has been run by Satakunta University of Applied Sciences Ltd, which is owned by both municipalities and organizations of trade and industry.

In March 2014, Citycon won the competitive tender for the campus project organised by the City of Pori. Construction started in early 2015. In June, Citycon sold the campus property next to the railway station to the Swedish real estate investment company Hemsö, to whom the premises were handed over upon completion.

The new campus in Pori was taken over by SAMK in May 2017, and the opening ceremony was held in the autumn of the same year. The Universities of Applied Sciences Act was amended, and universities of applied sciences were obliged to charge tuition fees for students from outside the EU or EEA. In spring 2016, 160 students from outside the EU/EEA were enrolled at SAMK, most of them from Nepal and Vietnam. A new degree programme started to train entrepreneurs.

=== 2020-current ===
SAMK switched to distance teaching in March 2020 due to the COVID-19 pandemic. In May, it was announced that the number of degrees and international students would be increased. In its supplementary budget, the Finnish government granted 2,200 additional student places to higher education institutions, 85 of which came to SAMK. During the year, the school awarded 993 bachelor's degrees and 165 master's degrees. Compared to the previous year, the number of degrees increased by 100.

== Organization ==
The operator of the University of Applied Sciences is Satakunta University of Applied Sciences Ltd. Satakunta University of Applied Sciences has campuses in Pori, Rauma, Huittinen and Kankaanpää. In 2023, Satakunta UAS had over 6,700 students and over 500 employees. Satakunta University of Applied Sciences Ltd is the responsible operator for the operations of the regional university of applied sciences in Satakunta (SAMK). The limited company is owned by both municipalities and organizations of trade and industry. SAMK's largest municipal owners are Pori (50%), Rauma (23%), Huittinen (5%) and Kankaanpää (2%).

SAMK has three strategic focus areas:

1. Automation, robotics and artificial intelligence
2. Human participation and functioning
3. Tourism and experience economy

and three emerging areas:

1. Intelligent maritime management and logistics
2. Resource wisdom
3. Welfare and health technology

=== Faculties ===
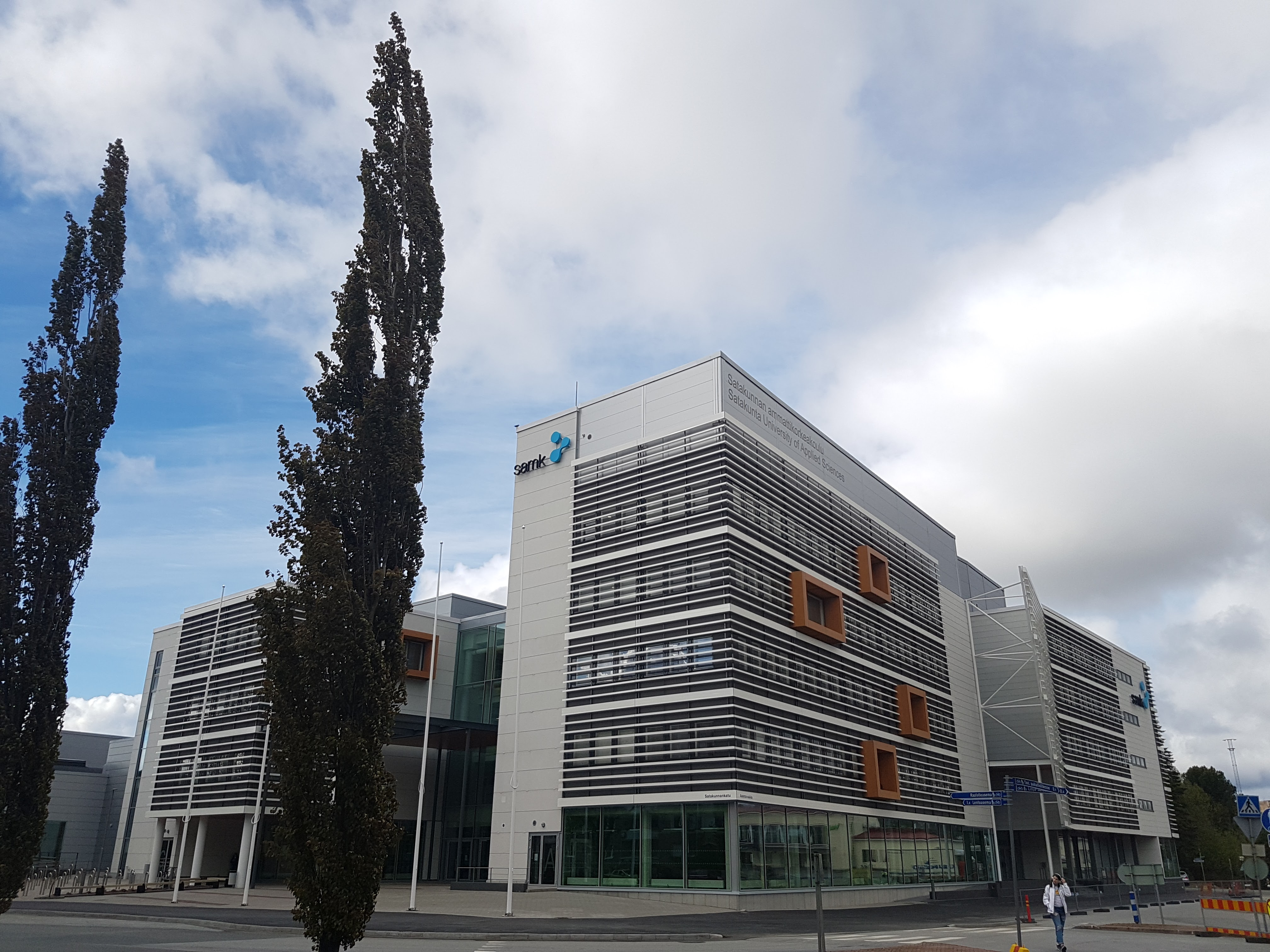
SAMK Campus in Pori, Finland

The faculties implement education, R&D activities, and business operations.

==== Health and Welfare ====
Health and Welfare faculty offers bachelor's and master's degree level education in Social and Health Services and Fine Arts. The faculty was the first to begin offering the Human Ageing and Elderly Services degree and also offers the only English-language Physiotherapy degree in the Nordic countries. The faculty is responsible for developing the aging services specialization, has strong expertise in accessibility and runs the learning centre Soteekki.

==== Service Business ====
This faculty is in charge of e.g. Tourism and Business related degrees: Economy and Financing, Sales and Marketing, Entrepreneurship, Business Law, Public Administration, Management and Digital Expertise. Of the emerging fields highlighted in the SAMK strategy, Tourism Business belongs in this faculty. With regard to tourism, special focus is placed on nature tourism and the development of local tourism.

==== Logistics and Maritime Technology ====
The Logistics and Maritime Technology faculty focuses on international business, logistics and maritime management. Of the areas of strength listed in the SAMK strategy, this faculty is in charge of maritime management and the emerging field of multi-disciplinary logistics. The faculty participates in, for example, co-operative projects for the development of maritime education in Namibia.

==== Technology ====
The Technology faculty is in charge of a majority of the Engineering degrees that SAMK offers. Of the areas highlighted in the SAMK strategy, Automation, Robotics and Artificial Intelligence, and Smart Water and Environmental Technology are this faculty's specialties. Notable laboratories and learning environments include e.g. the telecommunications NGN lab, solar power lab and simulation environments. The water institute Wander is also a part of the faculty.

=== Campuses ===
Satakunta University of Applied Sciences operates at the SAMK Campus Pori, the SAMK Campus Rauma, the Fine Arts Campus in Kankaanpää and the Kuninkainen campus in Huittinen.

==== SAMK Campus Pori ====
The current campus in Pori was completed in 2017 in Asema-aukio, next to the railway station, replacing the previous campuses. The campus has 4,200 students studying business, tourism, social and health care, and technology. Degrees are available in Finnish and English.

==== SAMK Campus Rauma ====
The new campus in Rauma, near the port, was opened in autumn 2015. Previously, the campus had been used to study shipping and business administration, but after the renovation, it was also used to study technology and nursing. The campus is home to the Maritime Logistics Research Center. The campus has 1,500 students of approximately 50 nationalities. Six of the degree programmes are in English.

Rauma Maritime Training Center is a joint training unit established together with WinNova. The joint maritime campus includes, for example, a robot station, i.e. a learning environment for the use of robotic and machine vision applications and training in remote control.

==== Fine Arts Campus in Kankaanpää ====
From the SAMK Kankaanpää School of Fine Arts, you can graduate with a Bachelor of Culture and Arts. The School of Fine Arts was founded by sculptor Kauko Räike and painter Juhani Tarna in 1965 on the initiative of the Kankaanpää Art Association. The school was municipalised in the 1980s and a new building was completed in 1995. The School of Fine Arts became part of SAMK in 1997. The campus has about 130 students in culture and arts.

==== Kuninkainen Campus ====
SAMK offers education in Huittinen in the Kuninkainen Education and Culture Center (unofficial translation of Kuninkaisten koulutus- ja kulttuurikeskus). The campus houses a unit for business studies and its library. In addition to SAMK, the center is home to Huittinen Vocational and Business College and Sataopisto (an adult education center in the area). The Kuninkainen Campus provides online education. The digital campus has more than 500 students in business administration.

=== Research activities ===
SAMK carries out research, development and innovation activities to support industrial renewal. It sees its strengths as expertise in entrepreneurship and start-ups, digital campus and online teaching. It works together with approximately 500 organizations each year.

SAMK's publication series consists of studies, reports, teaching materials and other publications. In addition, SAMK edits and produces magazines, brochures, guides, etc. Most of the publications are openly accessible on Theseus.fi.

SAMK's RDI activities are concentrated in five centers.

- RoboAI Research and Development center is located in Pori and focuses on automation, robotics and artificial intelligence. The Ministry of Education and Culture has granted SAMK funding for the use of artificial intelligence in medical research in Pori, Turku University Hospital and CSC, IT Center for Science. RoboAI collaborates with the Robocoast network, coordinated by the development company Prizztech, which in January 2022 included more than 100 automation, robotics, AI, sensor and IoT companies from Satakunta.
- The Maritime Logistics Research Center is based in Rauma and focuses on shipping, logistics and security of supply. The center has three research groups: intelligent shipping, logistics and automation.
- The research center WANDER in Rauma focuses on water, materials and indoor hygiene. The center started its activities in 2005 as the Water Institute.
- The Center for Tourism Business Development focuses on sustainable and responsible tourism and digital tourism development.
- Business Intelligence Center BIC established in early 2022. BIC aims to improve the competitiveness, efficiency, productivity and well-being of organizations by harnessing knowledge, data and thinking.

== Education ==
The faculties of Satakunta University of Applied Sciences are:

- Health and Welfare
- Logistics and Maritime Technology
- Service Business
- Technology

At SAMK, you can study for a bachelor's degree in Finnish in full-time day studies or multiform studies, which means that you can study while working, usually at any time and place, and the guidance is online – in some degree programmes, you can complete all your studies in this way. In contrast, the bachelor's degree programmes taught in English can be completed only as full-time day studies, whereas the master's degree programmes taught in English can be completed either as full-time or multiform studies.

To apply for a master's degree programme, you must have at least two years' work experience in the field after completing a bachelor's degree from a university or a university of applied sciences.

The degree can be complemented by specialization studies in various subject areas. You can also study at an open university of applied sciences. The credits from an open UAS can be included in the degree studies at a later stage.

For example, in 2016, there were four English-language degree programmes available: physiotherapy, international business, business management and entrepreneurship, and information technology.

=== Degrees in English ===
==== Bachelor's Degrees ====
In 2023 SAMK had the following Bachelor's Degrees:

- Industrial Management, Bachelor of Engineering
- Logistics, Bachelor of Engineering
- Physiotherapy, Bachelor of Health Care
- International Business, Bachelor of Business Administration
- International Tourism Development, Bachelor of Hospitality Management
- Nursing, Bachelor of Health Care
- Sea Captain, Bachelor of Marine Technology

The duration of bachelor's degree Programmes is 210 or 240 ECTS credits, and their completion time usually takes from 3.5 to 4.5 years.

==== Master's Degrees ====
In 2023 SAMK had following Master's degrees:

- Business Management and Entrepreneurship, Master of Business Administration
- Maritime Management, Master of Marine Technology or Master of Engineering
- Rehabilitation, Master of Health Care or Master of Social Services
- Welfare Technology, Master of Engineering or Master of Health Care

The scope of the studies is 60–90 credits. The degree can be completed while working in about 1.5–2.5 years.

== Recognitions ==
In February 2016, the Finnish Education Evaluation Centre (Karvi) awarded SAMK a quality label in its audit, which was valid for the next six years. In 2022, SAMK passed the audit again.

SAMK's teaching quality was selected as the best among Finnish universities of applied sciences in a feedback survey of students who graduated from universities of applied sciences in 2020. SAMK had ranked among the top in the same survey in the preceding years.
