= Pori Old Town Hall =

Building in Pori, Finland

Coordinates: 61.489565°N 21.793839°E

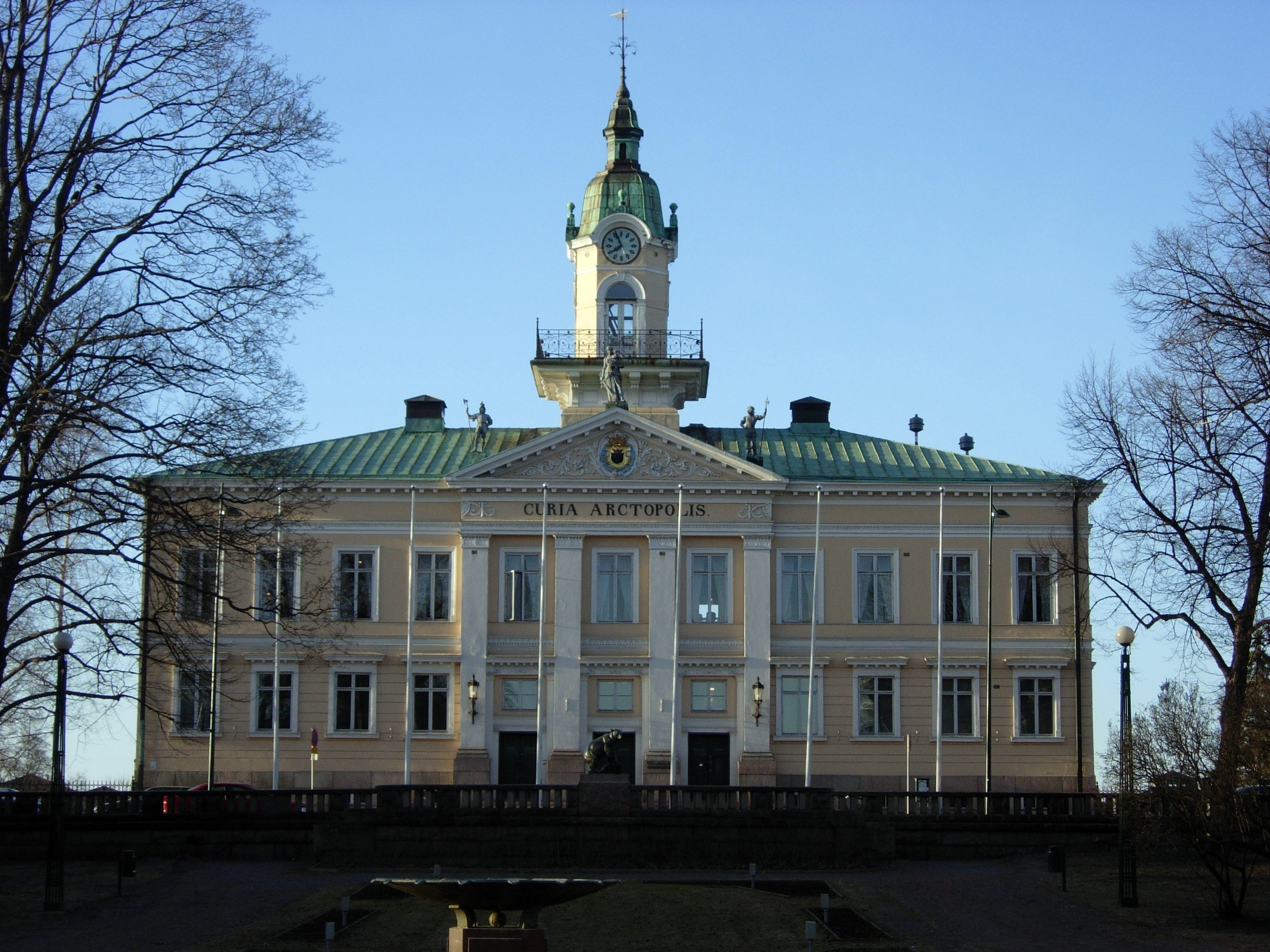
Pori Old Town Hall

Pori Old Town Hall (Finnish: Porin raatihuone) is a former town hall located in Pori, Finland. It was completed in 1841 by the design of German architect Carl Ludvig Engel.

Neoclassical style town hall is one of the few buildings in Pori that was saved from the great fire of 1852 as only the clock tower was destroyed. Tower was rebuilt in 1891. The pediment features a Latin description "Curia Arctopolis" meaning "the court of Pori". The Latin name "Arctopolis" is a translation of city's Swedish name "Björneborg".

Pori Old Town Hall served the city government until 1961. Today it is used by the city tourist office and other city officials. A restaurant is placed in the basement at the former city jail. In 2008 a statue of the founder of Pori, John III of Sweden, was revealed by the Old Town Hall.
