= Fritz Arthur Jusélius =

Finnish industrialist and member of parliament

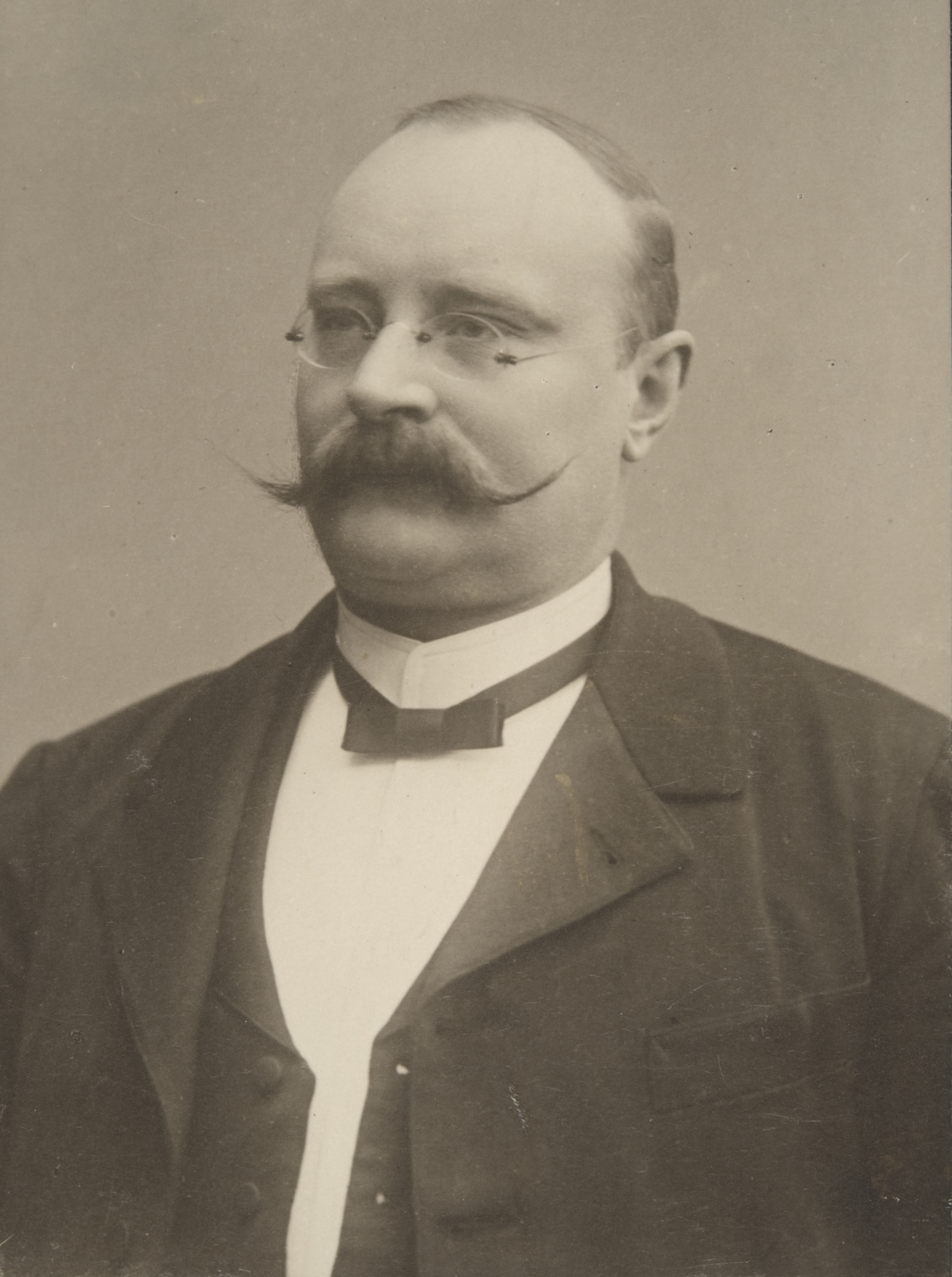
Jusélius in 1905

Fritz Arthur Jusélius (13 June 1855 Pori – 8 February 1930) was a Finnish industrialist and a member of parliament.

In 1903 Juselius built the Juselius Mausoleum as the last resting place of his daughter Sigrid, who died at the age of 11.
