= Jusélius Mausoleum =

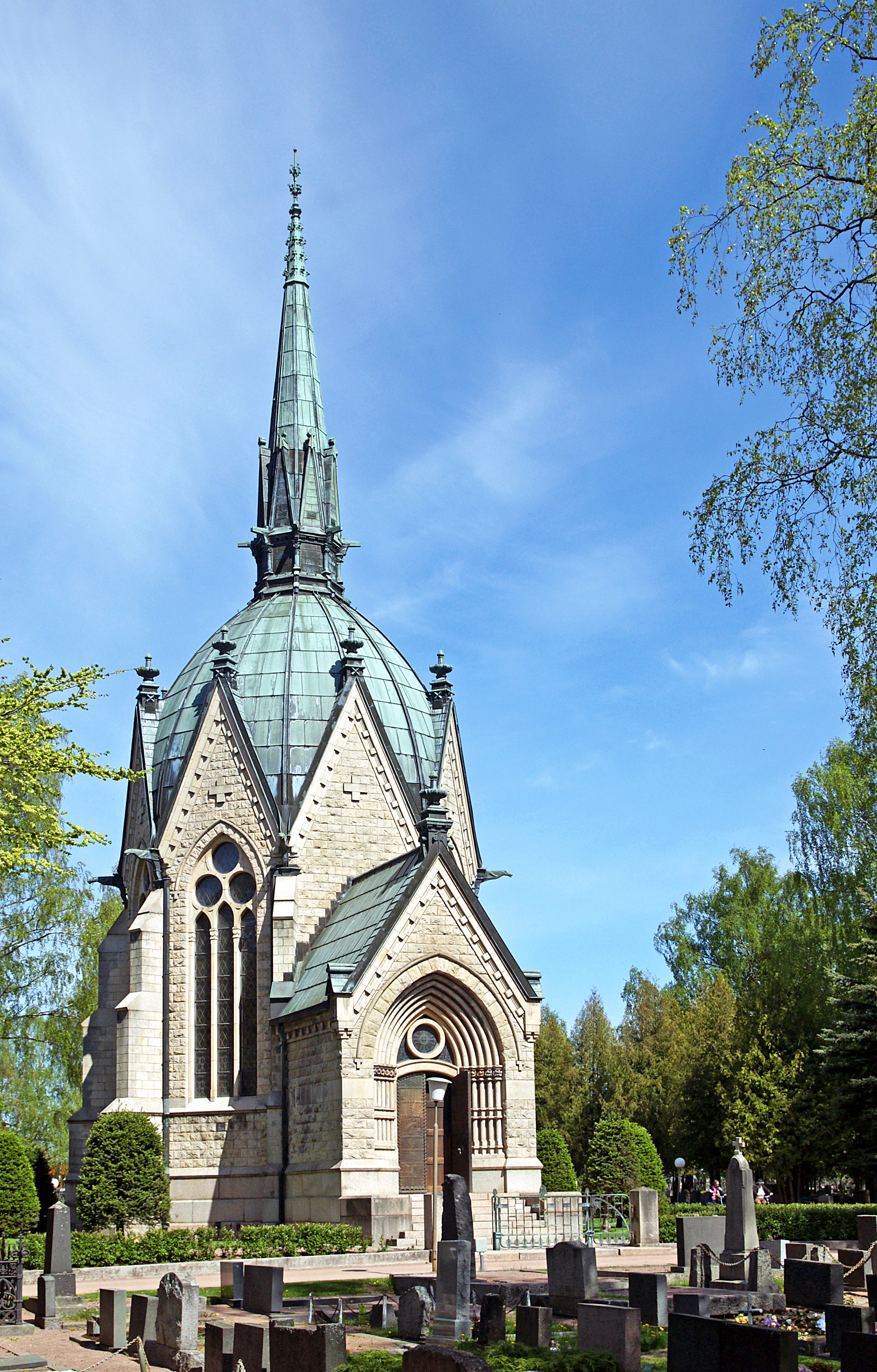
- Interactive map of Jusélius Mausoleum
- 61°29′16″N 21°45′34″E
- Location: Pori, Finland

History
- Built: 1901–1903

Site notes
- Elevation: 13 m (43 ft)
- Architect: Josef Stenbäck
- Architectural style: Gothic Revival

Jusélius Mausoleum (Finnish: Juséliuksen mausoleumi) is at the Käppärä Cemetery in Pori, Finland and was completed in 1903.

== Sigrid Juselius ==
The mausoleum was built by local businessman Fritz Arthur Jusélius (1855–1930) for his daughter Sigrid (1887–1898) to be her last place of rest. Sigrid died of tuberculosis at the age of eleven. Her sarcophagus is placed in the basement of the mausoleum. It can be seen from the upper floor. The sarcophagus is made of white Italian marble and designed by architect Jarl Eklund.

Fritz Arthur Jusélius himself is also buried in the mausoleum in its side wing. His two wives have their resting places outside the mausoleum. The Sigrid Juselius Foundation was established in 1930 to promote medical research in Finland.

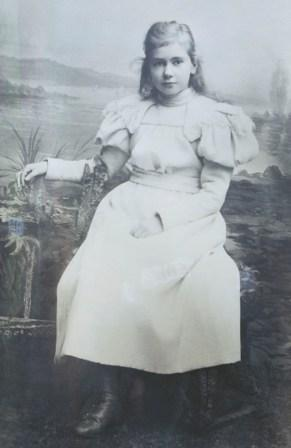
Sigrid Juselius (1887–1898)

== Mauseoleum ==
The Juselius Mausoleum was built in 1901–1903. It was planned by Josef Stenbäck in the Gothic Revival style. The Finnish artist Akseli Gallen-Kallela painted the interior, including frescoes "Kevät" (Spring), "Rakennus" (Construction), "Tuonelan joella" (By the River of Tuonela), "Hävitys" (Destruction), "Talvi" (Winter) and "Syksy" (Autumn). The original frescoes were destroyed by fire in 1931. They were repainted by Gallen-Kallela's son Jorma Gallen-Kallela in 1933–1939, based on preserved sketches and the mausoleum was reopened in 1941.

The Finnish artist Pekka Halonen painted the frescoes on the vestibule. They were destroyed as well, and never repainted.

The Juselius Mausoleum and the surrounding Käppärä Cemetery are listed as Cultural environments of national significance by the Finnish National Board of Antiquities.

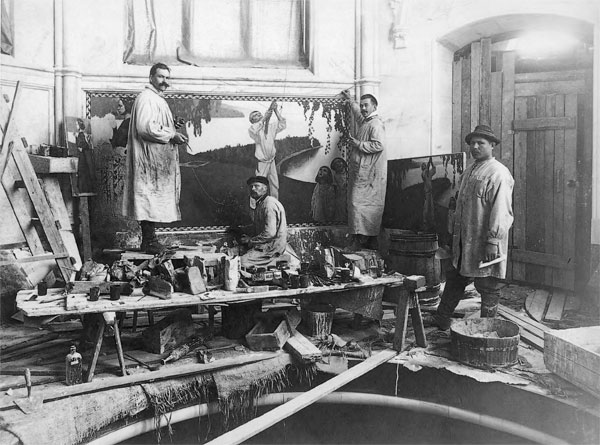
Gallen-Kallela (left) painting Spring in 1903

== Frescos ==
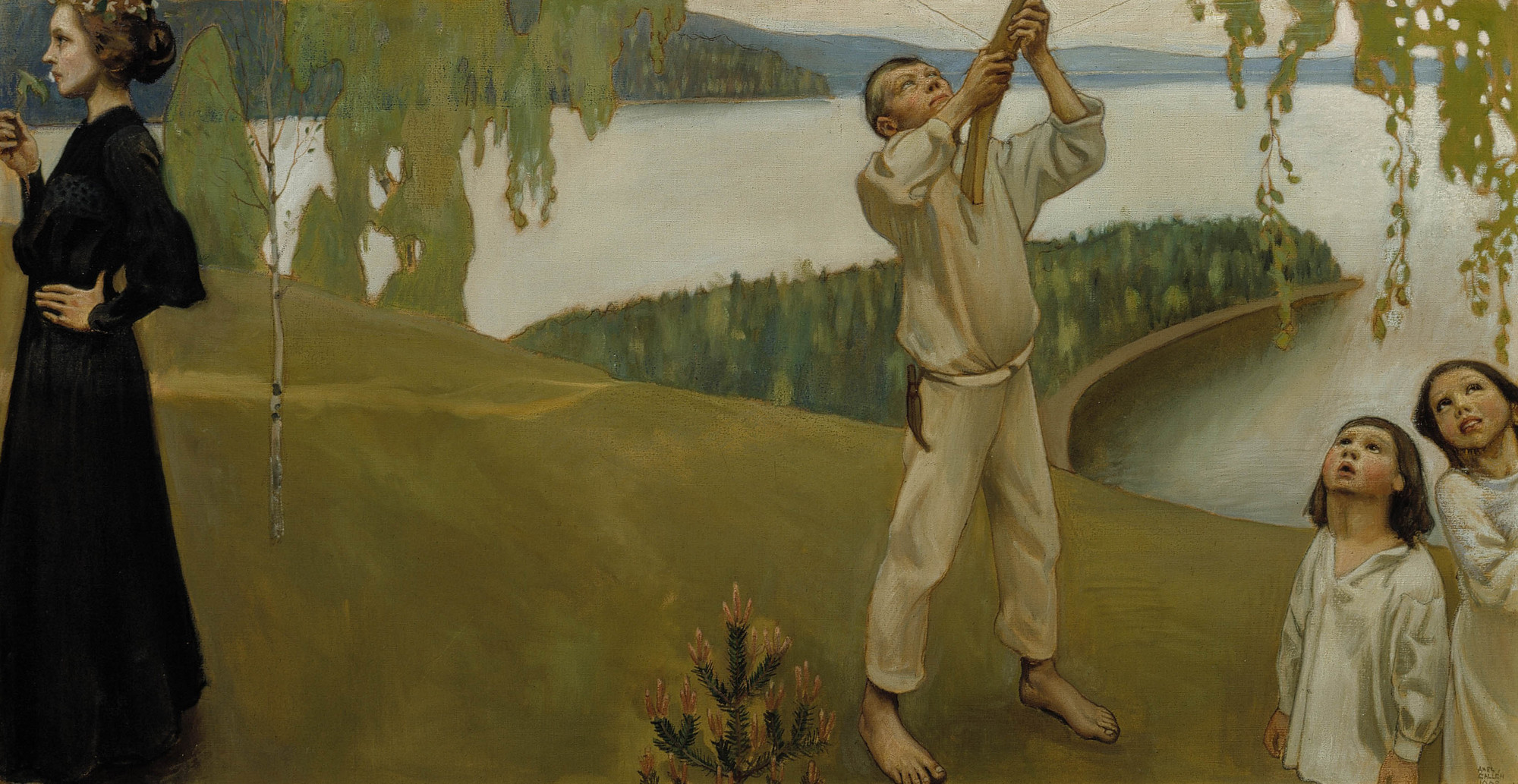
Akseli Gallen-Kallela's original sketch for Spring, 1903

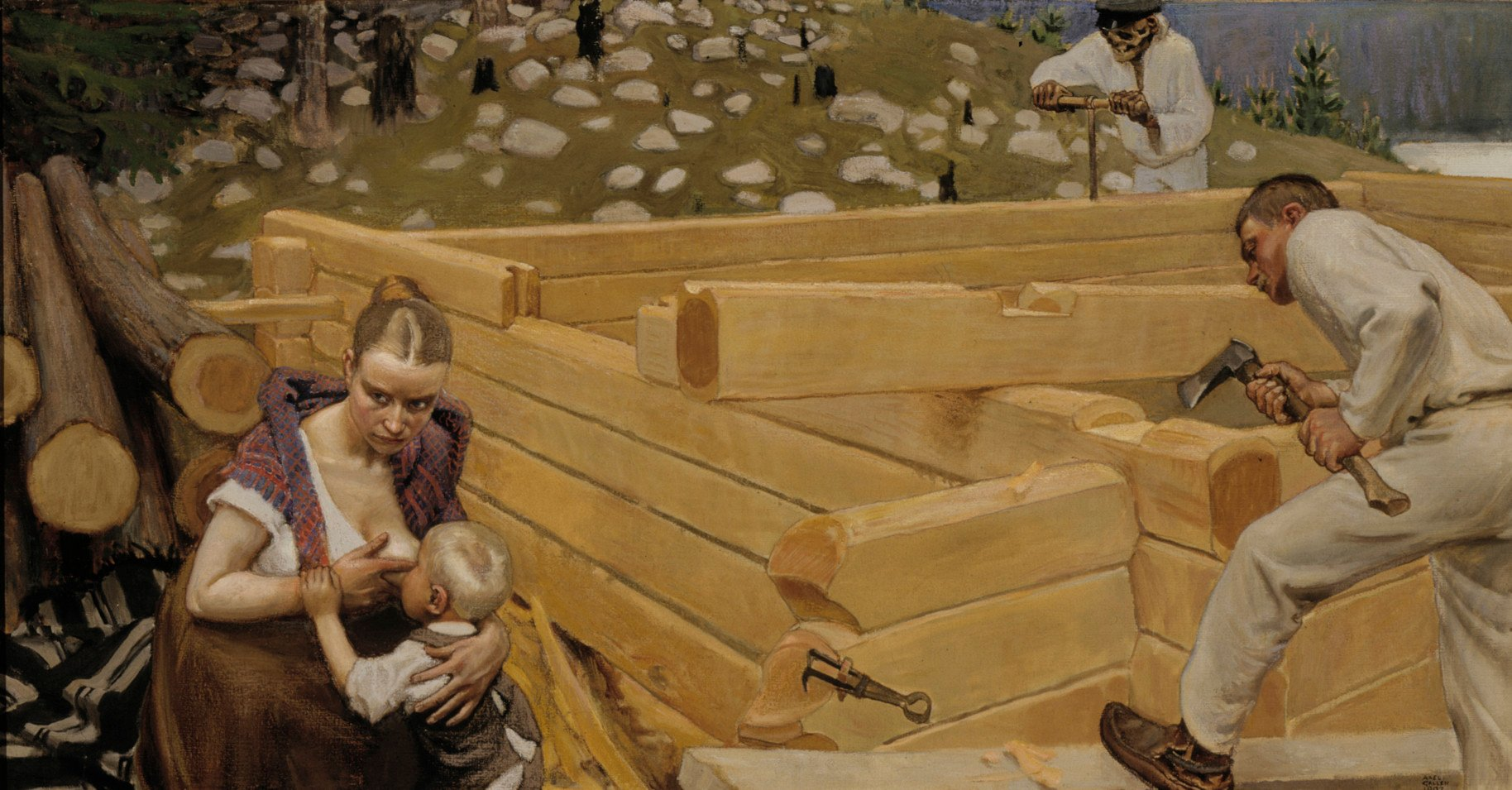
Sketch for Construction, 1903

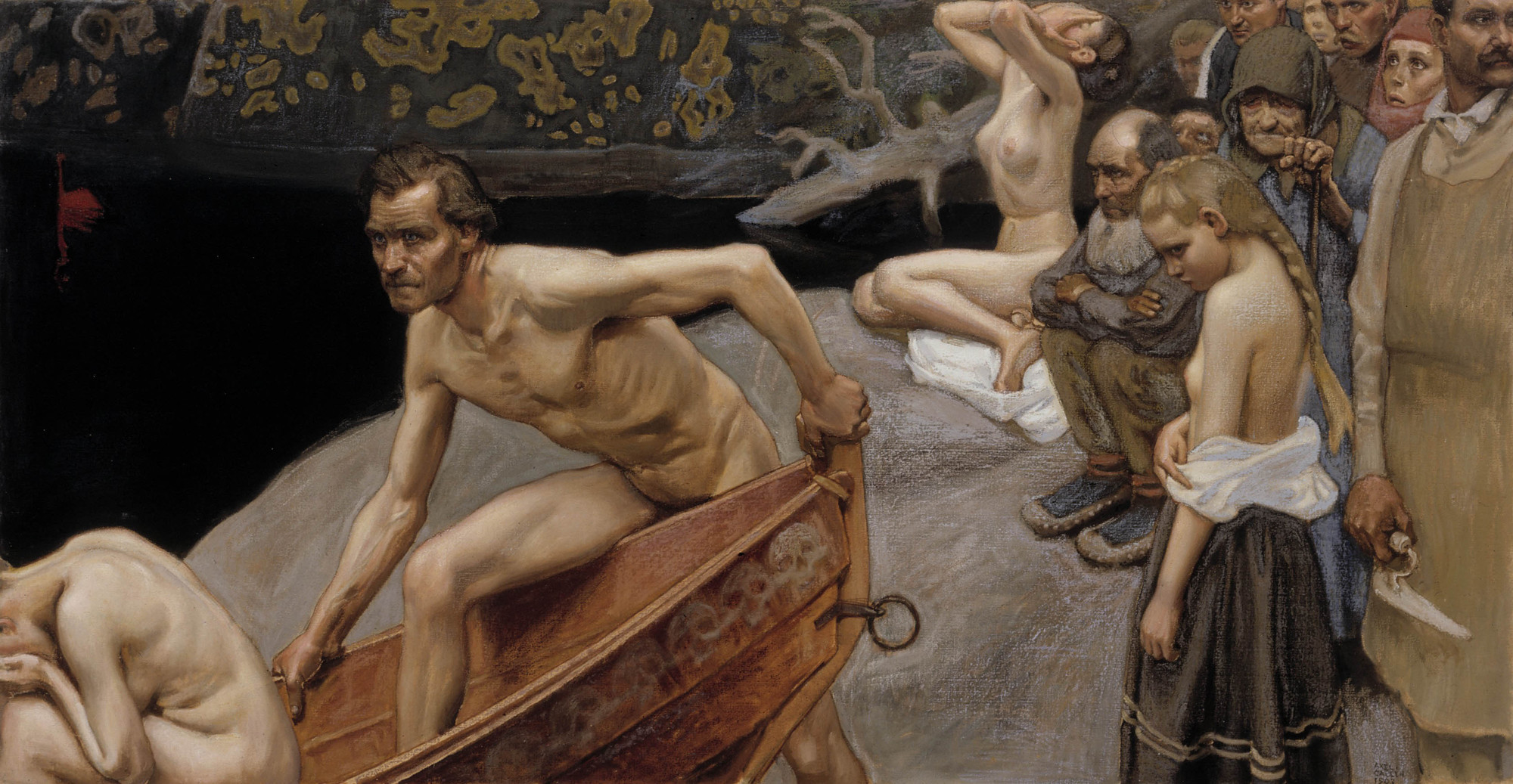
Sketch for By the River of Tuonela, 1903

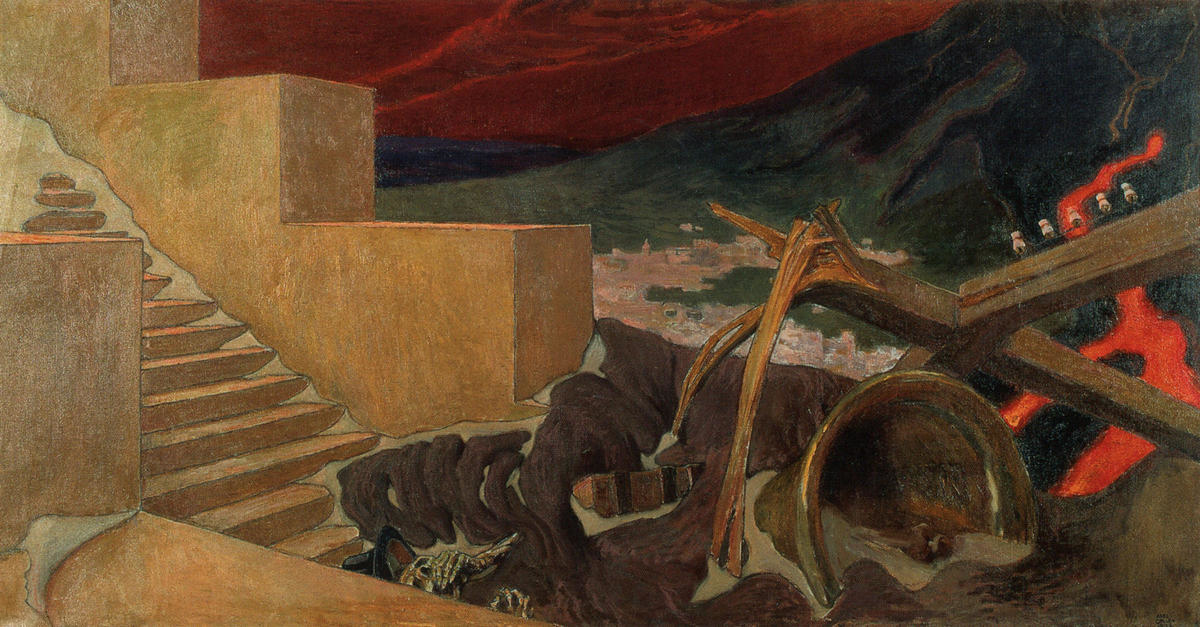
Sketch for Destruction, 1902

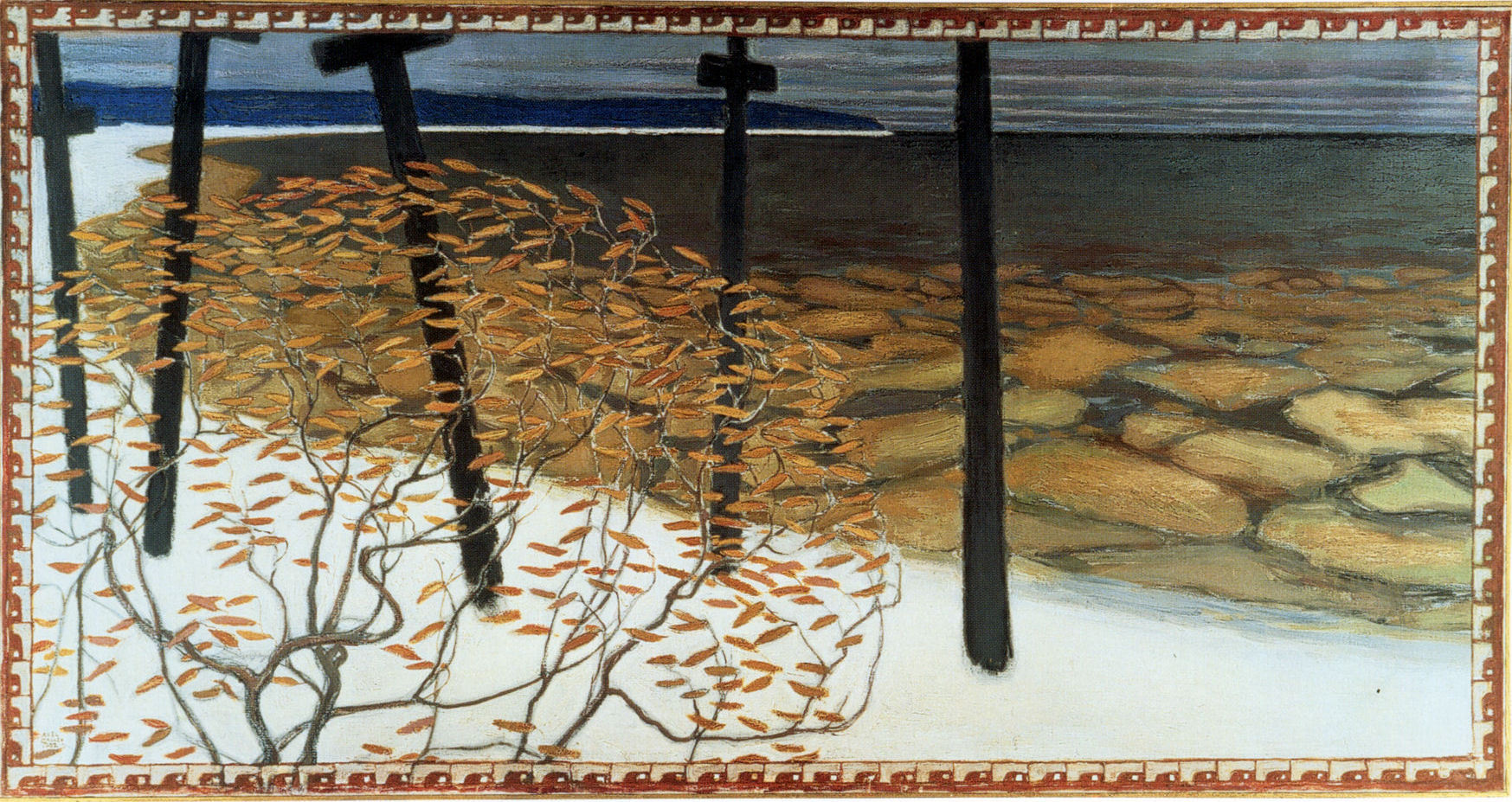
Sketch for Autumn, 1902

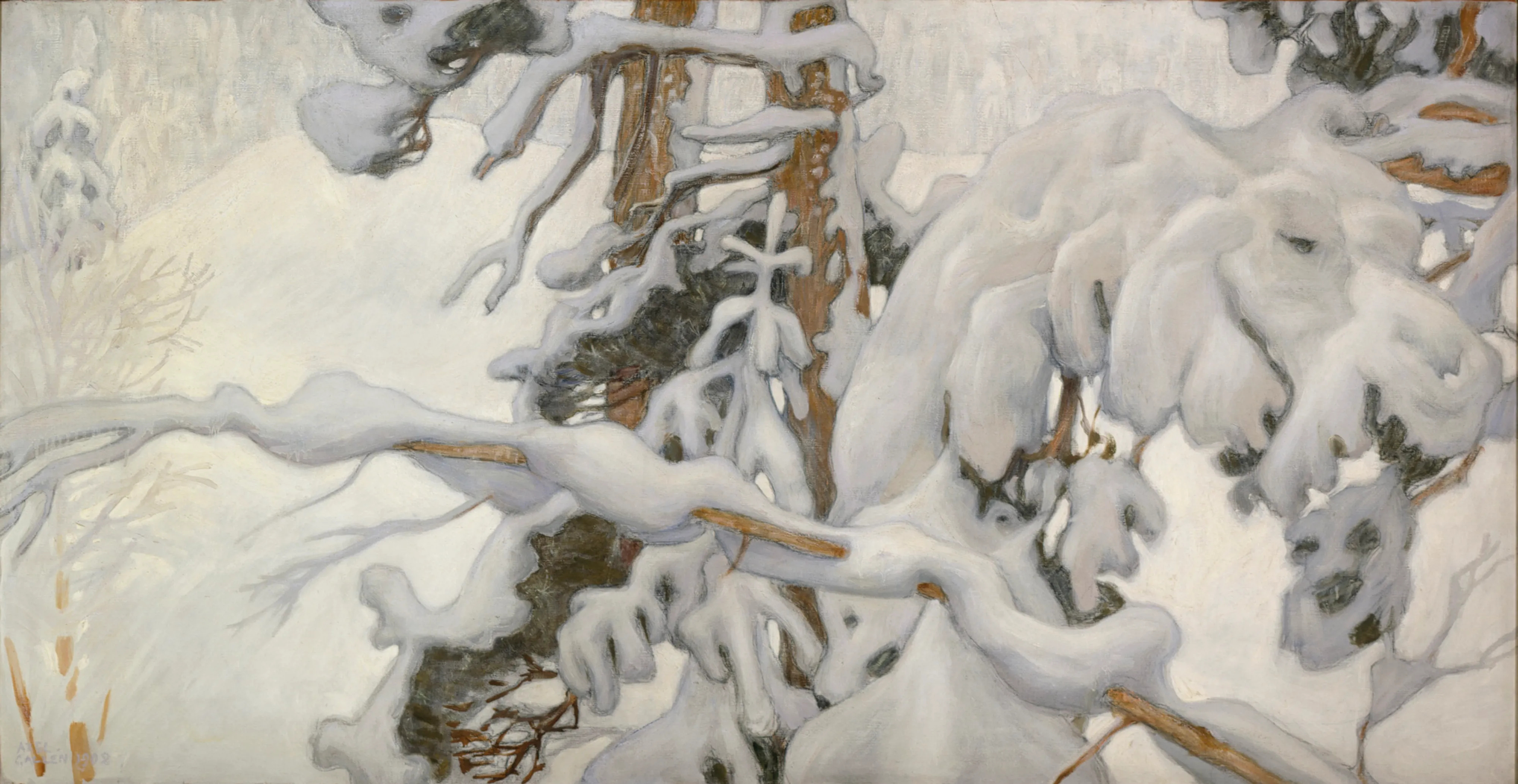
Sketch for Winter, 1902

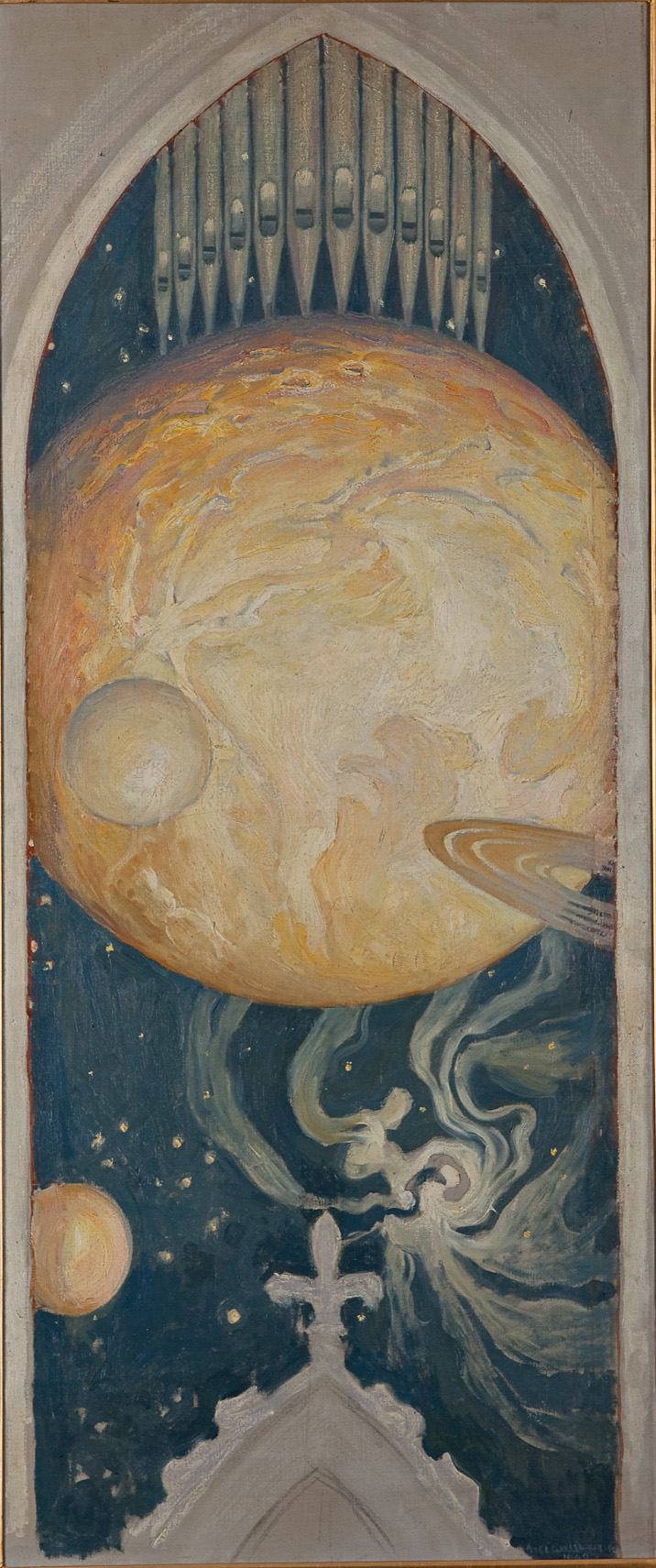
Sketch for Cosmos, 1902

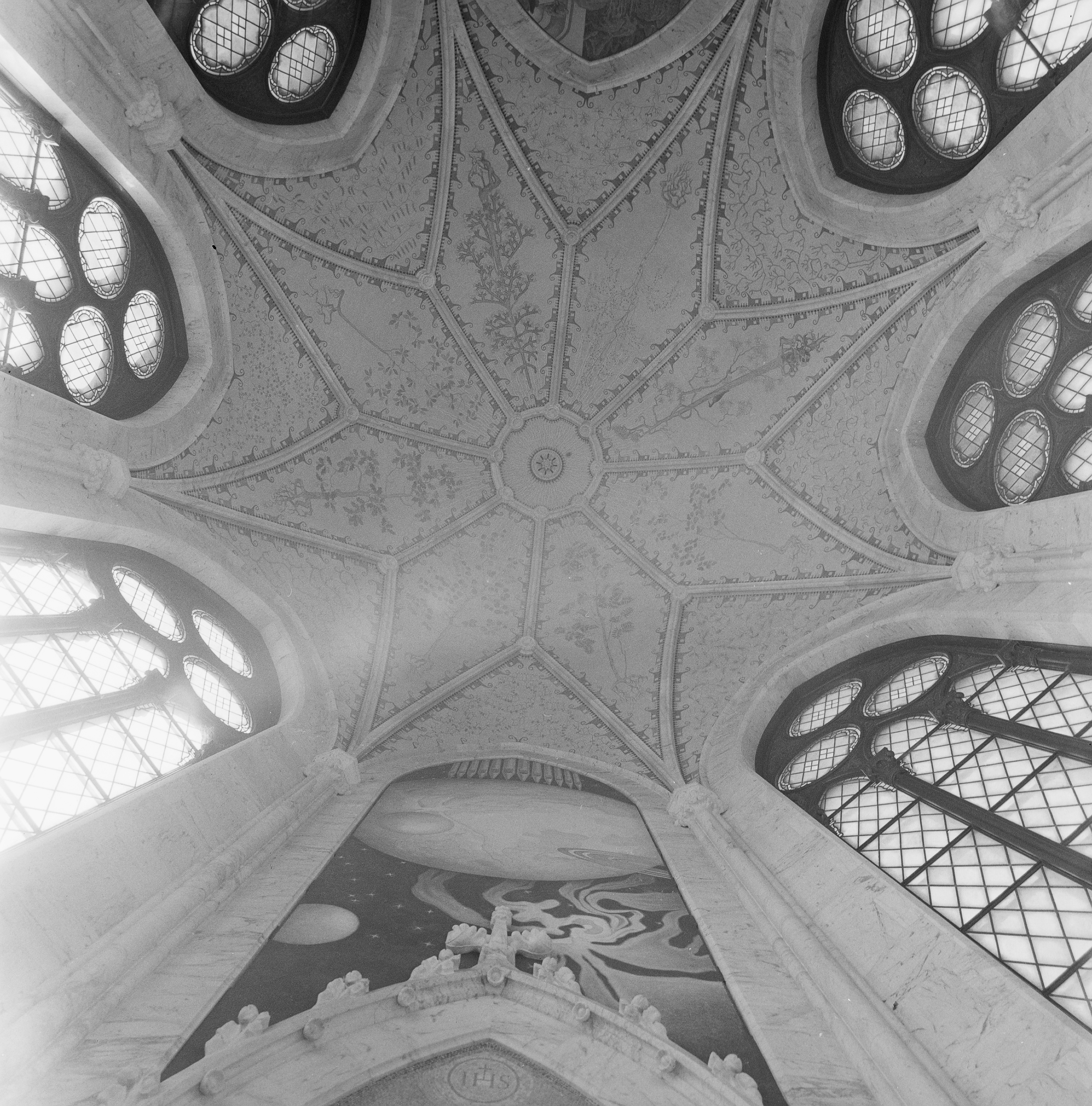
Dome of the mausoleum
