= Art Association NYTE =

Coordinates: 61°28′59″N 21°48′00″E

Art Association NYTE ry
- Founded: 1987; Pori, Satakunta, Finland
- Type: Non-governmental organization
- Purpose: Art, live art, performance
- Location: Pori, (international)
- Region served: Finland
- Method: Artivism, social center, research, innovation
- Members: 50 (2009)
- Key people: Annukka Olli, Chairman
- Website: Taiteilijaseura NYTE

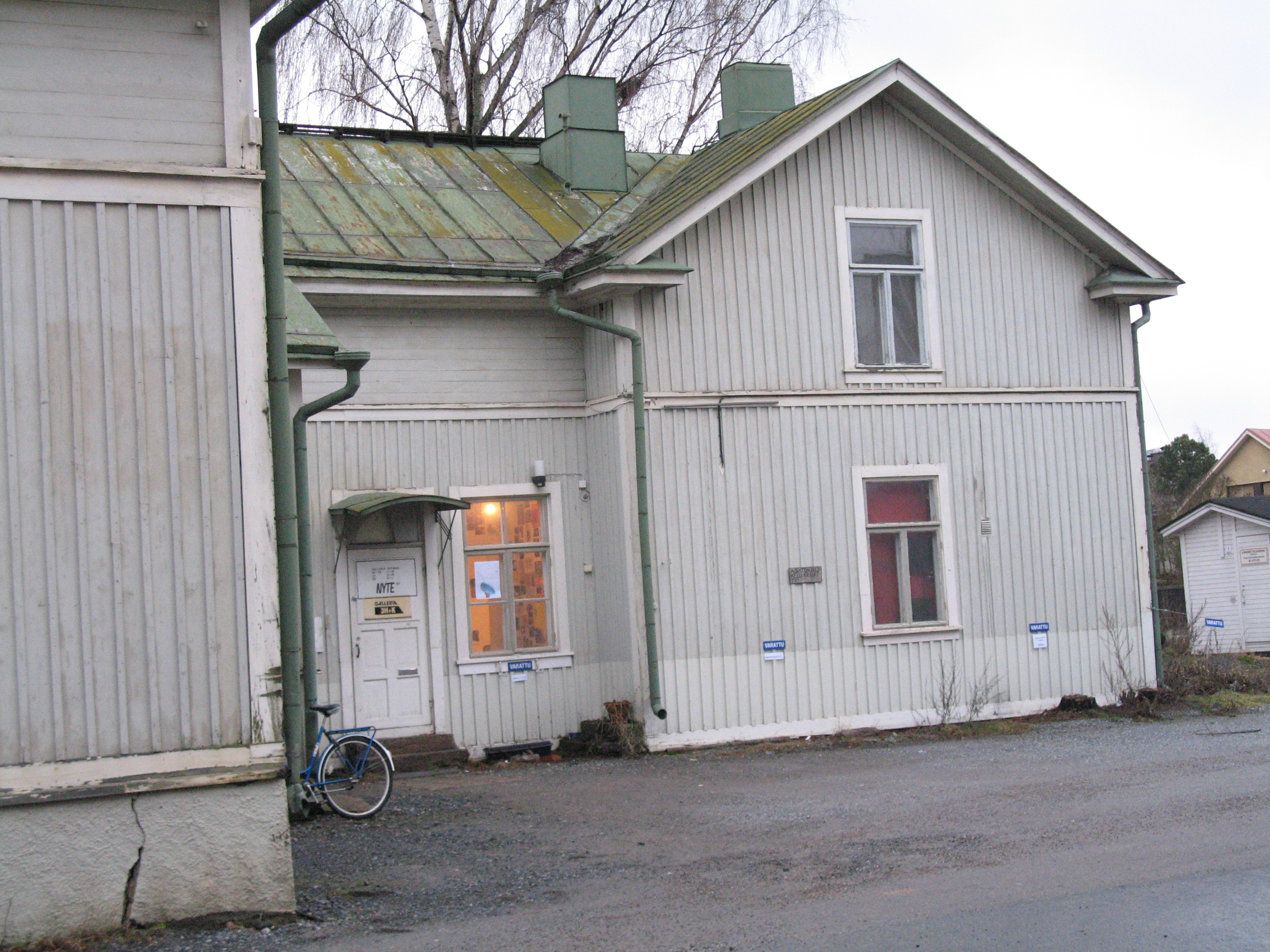
NYTE's premises in center of Pori.

Art Association NYTE ry is founded in 1987 in Pori as an artist group and art association. It is as a launching platform for young artists in Satakunta Region.

Art Association NYTE ry begun as an interdisciplinary artist group which included artists from various fields including, fine-art, Cinema and Live-Arts.

Many of NYTE's activities take place in the social centre 3h+k. Which translates as three rooms and a kitchen. It includes a theatre, gallery space and computer resource room. There is also an outside yard used for some performances and was started in the 1980s.
