= Pori =

City in Satakunta, Finland

Pori Björneborg (Swedish)
- City
- Porin kaupunki Björneborgs stad City of Pori
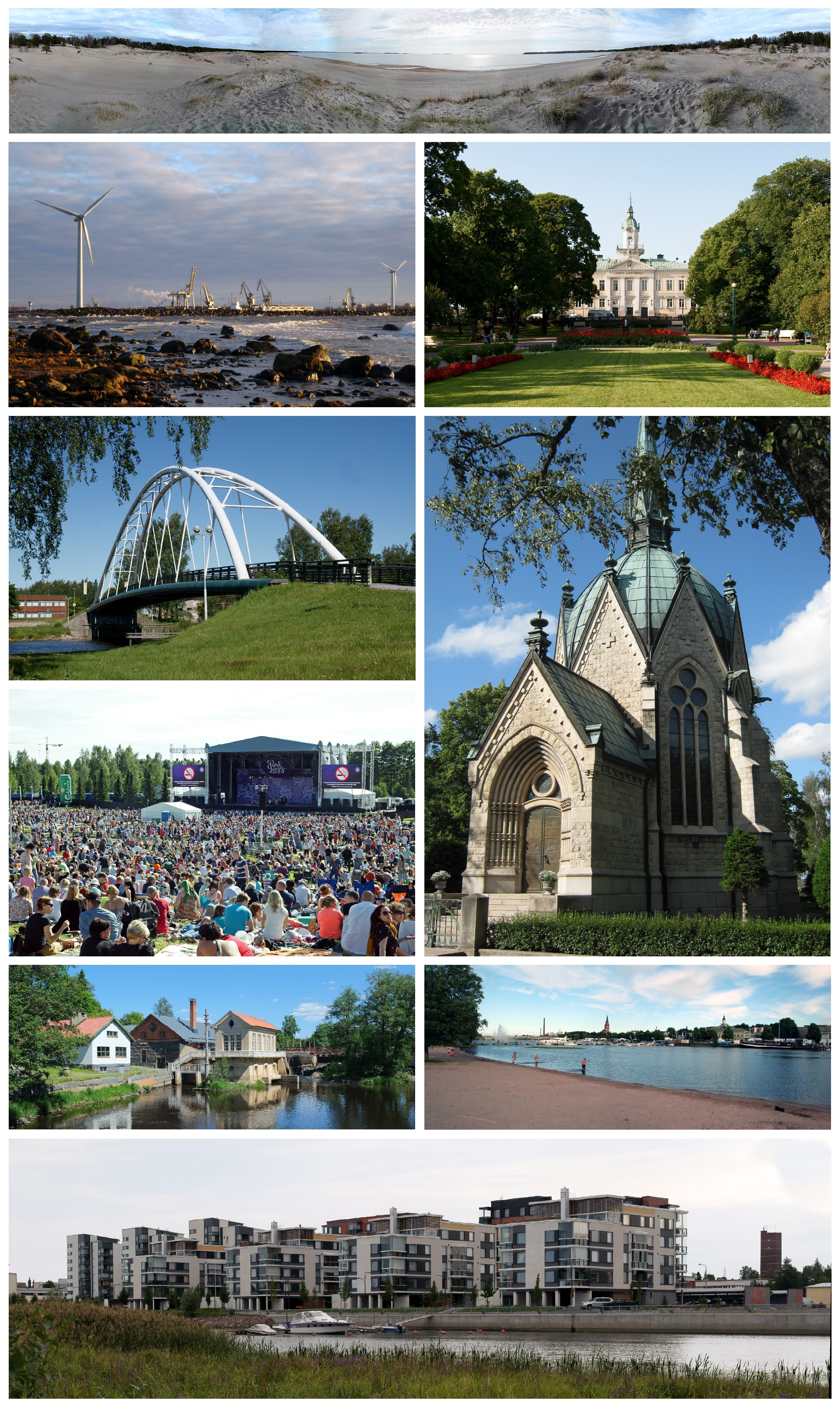
- Montage of Pori

- Flag Coat of arms
- Nickname: Bear City
- Motto: "Deus protector noster." (English: "God [is] our protector.")
- Location of Pori in Finland
- Interactive map of Pori
- Coordinates: 61°29′N 021°48′E
- Country: Finland
- Region: Satakunta
- Sub-region: Pori
- Charter: March 8, 1558; 468 years ago

Government
  - City Manager: Lauri Inna

Area (2018-01-01)
  - City: 2,062.00 km^{2} (796.14 sq mi)
  - Land: 1,156.16 km^{2} (446.40 sq mi)
  - Water: 870.01 km^{2} (335.91 sq mi)
  - Urban: 121.37 km^{2} (46.86 sq mi)
  - Rank: 64th largest in Finland

Population (2025-12-31)
  - City: 83,010
  - Rank: 10th largest in Finland
  - Density: 71.8/km^{2} (186/sq mi)
  - Urban: 84,026
  - Urban density: 693.6/km^{2} (1,796/sq mi)

Population by native language
  - Finnish: 93.2% (official)
  - Swedish: 0.6%
  - Others: 6.3%

Population by age
  - 0 to 14: 14%
  - 15 to 64: 59.7%
  - 65 or older: 26.3%
- Time zone: UTC+02:00 (EET)
  - Summer (DST): UTC+03:00 (EEST)
- Unemployment rate: 11.08%
- Climate: Dfb
- Website: pori.fi

Pori (Finnish: [ˈpori]; Swedish: Björneborg [bjœːrneˈborj]; Latin: Arctopolis) is a city in Finland and the regional capital of Satakunta. It is located on the west coast of the country, on the Gulf of Bothnia. The population of Pori is approximately 83,000, while the sub-region has a population of approximately 128,000. It is the 10th most populous municipality in Finland, and the eighth most populous urban area in the country.

Pori is located some 10 kilometres (6 mi) from the Gulf of Bothnia, on the estuary of the Kokemäki River, 110 kilometres (68 mi) west of Tampere, 140 kilometres (87 mi) north of Turku and 241 kilometres (150 mi) north-west of Helsinki, the capital of Finland. Pori covers an area of 2,062.00 square kilometres (796.14 sq mi) of which 870.01 km^{2} (335.91 sq mi) is water. The population density is 71.8/km^{2} (186/sq mi).

Pori was established in 1558 by Duke John, who later became King John III of Sweden. The municipality is unilingually Finnish. Pori was also once one of the main cities with Turku in the former Turku and Pori Province (1634–1997). The neighboring municipalities are Eurajoki, Kankaanpää, Kokemäki, Merikarvia, Nakkila, Pomarkku, Sastamala, Siikainen and Ulvila.

Pori is especially known nationwide for its Jazz Festival, Yyteri's sandy beaches, Kirjurinluoto, Porin Ässät ice hockey club, FC Jazz football club, which won two championships in the Veikkausliiga in the 1990s, and Pori Theater, which is the first Finnish-language theater in Finnish history. Pori is also known for its local street food called porilainen. During its history, the city of Pori has burned down nine times; only Oulu has burned more often, as many as ten times. The current coat of arms of Pori was confirmed for use by President P. E. Svinhufvud on December 11, 1931, and was later redrawn by Olof Eriksson. The city council reaffirmed the use of the redrawn version on October 27, 1959. The bear motif of the coat of arms comes from a 17th century seal and the motto, deus protector noster or "God is our protector", is also on the coat of arms of the city's founder, Duke John.

== Name ==
The Finnish name Pori comes from the -borg part (meaning citadel, fortress or castle) of the original name in Swedish with a Fennicised pronunciation. The whole Swedish name Björneborg literally means Bear Fortress or Bear Castle (Finnish: Karhulinna), and the Latin-Greek Arctopolis means Bear City (Finnish: Karhukaupunki).

== History ==
=== Early years ===
City of Pori was established on March 8, 1558 by Duke John of Finland (Finnish: Juhana III or Juhana-herttua) who was later known as John III of Sweden. It was a successor to the medieval towns of Teljä (Kokemäki) and Ulvila. Sailing the Kokemäki river had become more and more difficult since the 14th century due to the post-glacial rebound. The importance of Kokemäki and Ulvila began to decline as the ships could no longer navigate the river. In the 16th century the situation had become so bad that Duke John decided to establish a new harbour and market town closer to the sea.

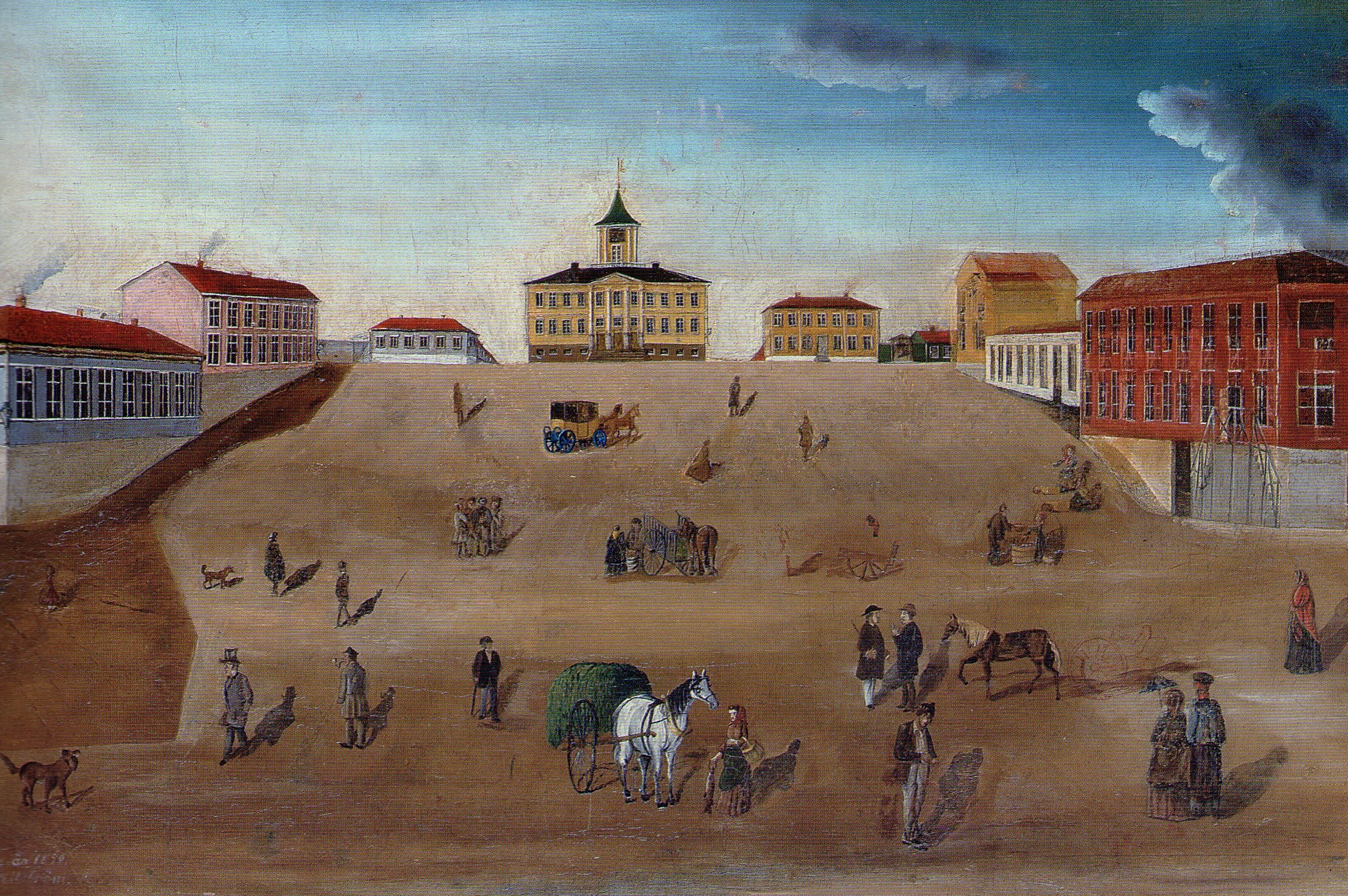
Old town hall and market square in 1852 painting

The Bourgeoisie of Ulvila were ordered to migrate to the newly founded city and on 8 March 1558 John III gave the charter of Pori, which read: "Because we have seen that it would be best to build a strong market town alongside the sea, and because we cannot find anywhere suitable for fortifying in Ulvila, we have chosen another location at Pori."

At the beginning Pori had around 300 involuntary residents. However, they soon recognized the advantages of their new location, which offered opportunities for profitable trading, among other things. Ship building has been important since the beginning of history of Pori. Shipyard started by the river in 1572 and it worked until the early 20th century. The biggest ship probably ever built in Pori was "Porin Kraveli," completed in 1583.

=== Greater Wrath and Crimean War ===
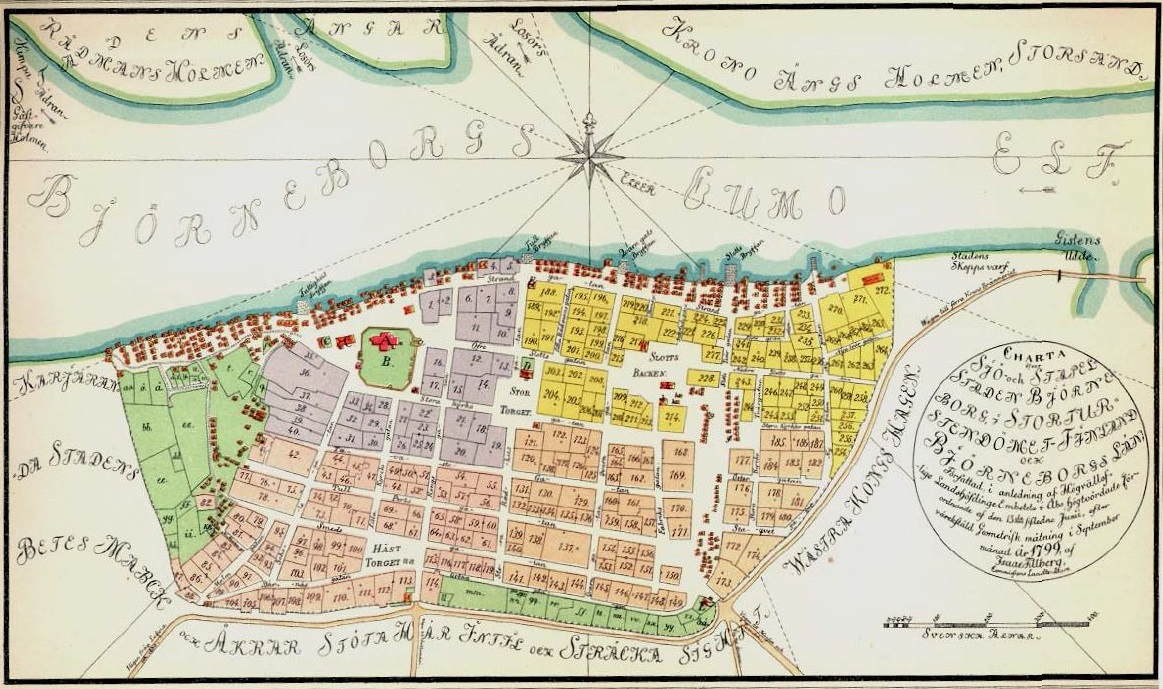
A grid plan from 1799 of Pori by Isaac Tillberg

During the Greater Wrath of 1713, Pori was occupied by Russian troops. Eight Russian regiments spent four months in town from September 1713 to January 1714 vandalizing and demolishing the city. Some of the wealthiest residents vanished, they were probably imprisoned and taken to Russia. Wind mills and storage houses were burnt. Most of the oxen and horses and more than 400 boats were lost. The Russian invasion of Finland continued another seven years. It meant great financial loss for Pori as the foreign trade was completely finished. After the Greater Wrath, Pori lost its staple rights and the city went into deep depression. A new "golden age" for Pori started in 1765 as the city got back the staple rights for foreign trade.

As the Crimean War broke out in 1853, Pori was attacked by both the French Navy and British Navy in 1855 during the Åland War. The French frigate D'Assos made the first attempt on July and managed to catch one ship outside the Isokari island before they sailed further north. Another attack was made by the British fleet on 9 August. Mayor Klaus Wahlberg negotiated a deal with the enemy and the city was saved. Two sailing ships and 17 smaller boats along with some other properties were given to the British. The activities of the people of Pori were considered shameful and according to some information, Lieutenant General Alexander von Wendt would have later demoted the officer who had retreated from Luotsinmäki to sergeant during a review held at the Pori market square.

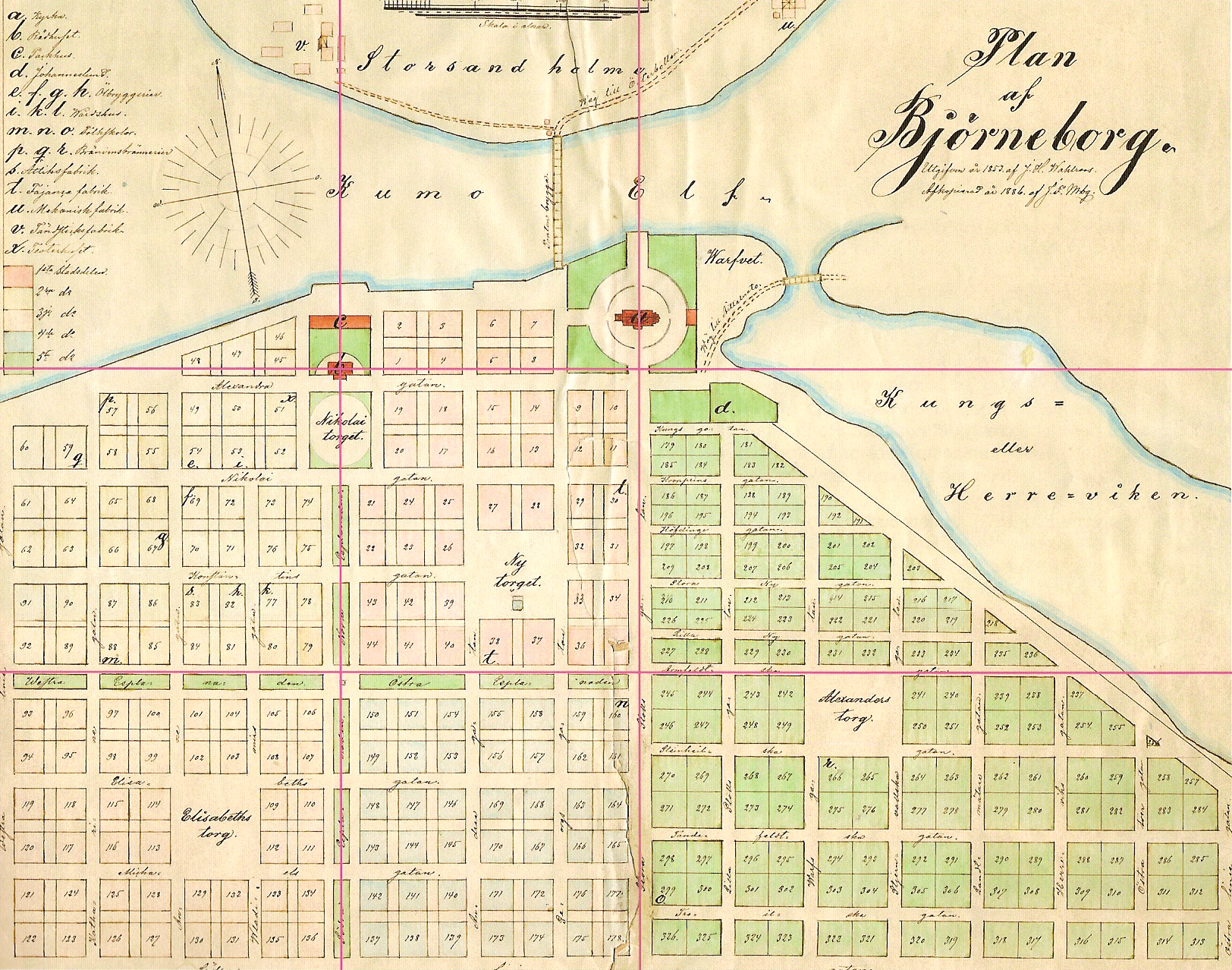
1852 city plan by G.T. von Chiewitz

=== City fires ===
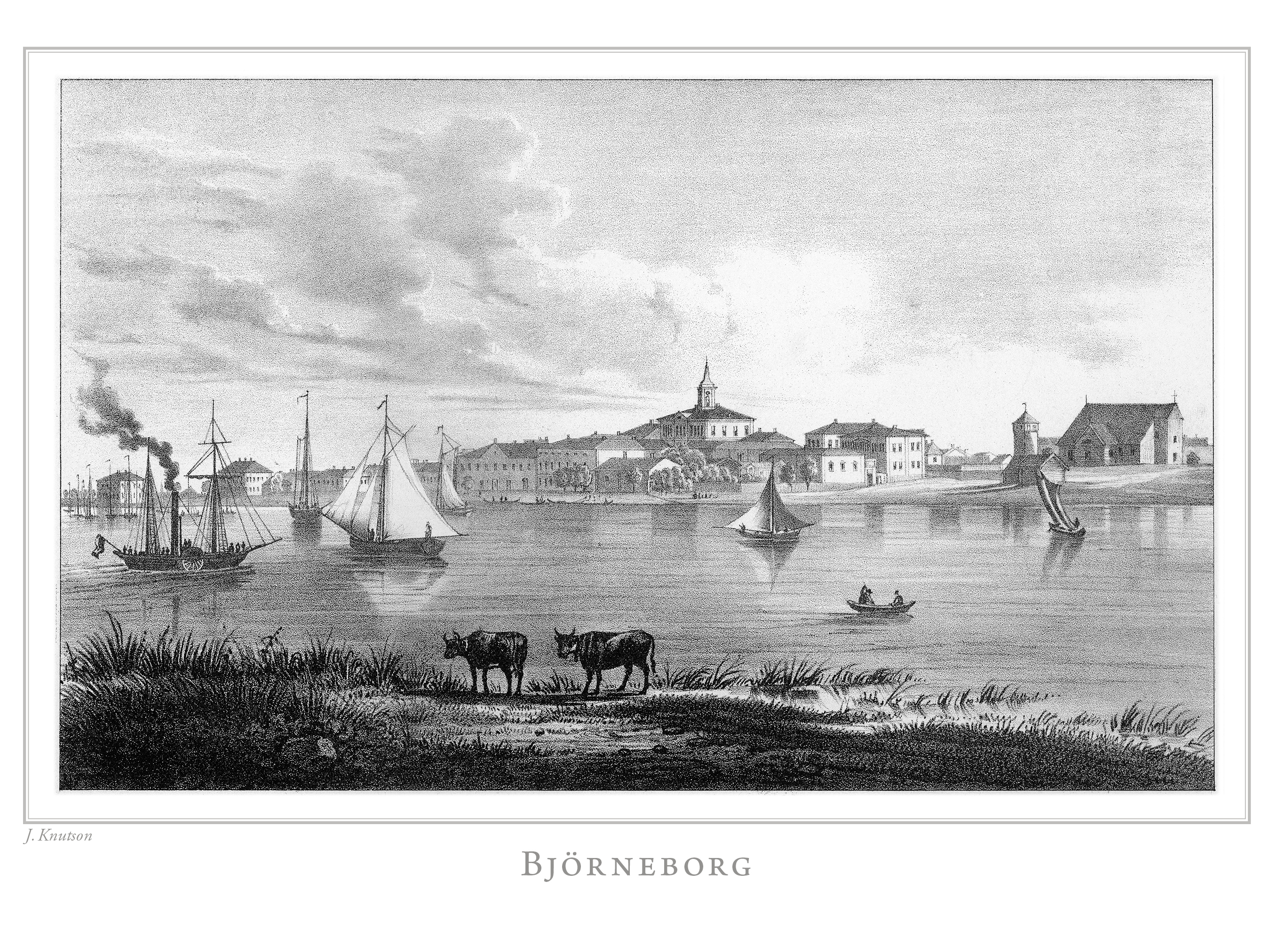
Illustration in Finland framstäldt i teckningar edited by Zacharias Topelius and published 1845-1852.

As most of its houses were made of wood, Pori has had its share of fires. The town has burned down and been rebuilt nine times. The city was first destroyed by fire in 1571 and the last major fire was in 1852. More than 75 per cent of the city was destroyed in 1852 and most of the residents became homeless. Only a few buildings, such as the Town Hall, were saved. The Great Fire of 1852 was one of the worst disasters in Finland so far. The new city plan and the shape of the present old town was designed by Swedish architect C. T. von Chiewitz. The newly completed buildings, such as the Pori Theatre and Hotel Otava are historically and culturally important. Four esplanades, which are wider than the other streets, divided the new city center in four parts.

=== Finnish Civil War and World War II ===
During the 1918 Finnish Civil War, Pori was a part of the Finnish Socialist Workers' Republic. The city was not on the direct war zone but some terror was made by both sides. The best known incident was the execution of 11 Whites at the schoolyard of Pori Lyceum.

During World War II, Pori was bombed four times by the Soviet Airforce in 1939–1940. The worst bombing occurred on 2 February 1940 as 21 people were killed. Most of the bombs were aimed to the harbour area instead of the city itself. From 1942 to 1944 Pori Airport served as an air depot for the Jagdgeschwader 5 of German Luftwaffe. Pori air depot was known as "Feldluftpark Pori" and it was one of the major German air depots in Northern Europe. In September 1944, Germans left the airport and destroyed many of their facilities with explosives. One German-built hangar is still used today. Total of 319 Soviet Red Army prisoners of war died in Pori as they were used as a forced labor by the Germans. Soviet soldiers are buried at Vähärauma district in the western part of the city.

== Geography ==
=== River and delta ===
The geological uplift after the last ice age has been relatively high at the mouth of the Kokemäenjoki river. When the city was established in 1558, it was situated on the shore of Pori bay. Because of this uplift the delta of the river now begins in front of the city. The recreation area of Kirjurinluoto is actually on an island connected with bridges to the mainland. Pori National Urban Park preserves the story of the phases of development of the town born at the mouth of the river Kokemäenjoki.

=== Climate ===
Pori has a humid continental climate (Dfb), with moderation from the Gulf of Bothnia helping to keep September above the 10 °C (50 °F) isotherm, and is amongst the northern extent of that climate in Finland. Winters are long, and cold, but are notably shorter and warmer than in the Northern parts of Finland due to the marine effect and location by the Bothnian Sea. The temperatures measured in the city center are slightly higher on average due to the urban heat island effect. Summers are relatively warm. The highest ever recorded temperature in this weather station was 33.3 °C (91.9 °F), on 13 July 2010 and the lowest official temperature ever recorded was -36.8 °C (-34.2 °F), on 3 February 1966. Visiting the famous "Yyteri" beach is arguably the best pastime thing to do in Pori on warm summer days. In fact, it gathers the most visitors out of any other beach in Finland on summers.

Climate data for Pori Airport, records 1960 - present
Month	Jan	Feb	Mar	Apr	May	Jun	Jul	Aug	Sep	Oct	Nov	Dec	Year
Record high °C (°F)	9.6 (49.3)	9.5 (49.1)	14.5 (58.1)	24.5 (76.1)	29.4 (84.9)	32.9 (91.2)	33.3 (91.9)	33.2 (91.8)	28.2 (82.8)	20.1 (68.2)	14.7 (58.5)	11.3 (52.3)	33.3 (91.9)
Mean daily maximum °C (°F)	−1.2 (29.8)	−1.3 (29.7)	2.4 (36.3)	8.7 (47.7)	15.0 (59.0)	18.9 (66.0)	21.8 (71.2)	20.6 (69.1)	15.3 (59.5)	8.5 (47.3)	3.3 (37.9)	0.5 (32.9)	9.4 (48.9)
Daily mean °C (°F)	−4.0 (24.8)	−4.6 (23.7)	−1.3 (29.7)	4.0 (39.2)	9.7 (49.5)	14.1 (57.4)	17.1 (62.8)	15.8 (60.4)	11.0 (51.8)	5.4 (41.7)	1.2 (34.2)	−1.8 (28.8)	5.6 (42.1)
Mean daily minimum °C (°F)	−7.0 (19.4)	−7.6 (18.3)	−4.9 (23.2)	−0.4 (31.3)	4.3 (39.7)	9.0 (48.2)	12.1 (53.8)	11.0 (51.8)	6.8 (44.2)	2.3 (36.1)	−1.3 (29.7)	−4.8 (23.4)	1.6 (34.9)
Record low °C (°F)	−35.7 (−32.3)	−36.8 (−34.2)	−27.1 (−16.8)	−16.3 (2.7)	−5.8 (21.6)	−2.0 (28.4)	1.7 (35.1)	−1.1 (30.0)	−7.3 (18.9)	−16.7 (1.9)	−22.5 (−8.5)	−35.4 (−31.7)	−36.8 (−34.2)
Average precipitation mm (inches)	44 (1.7)	28 (1.1)	29 (1.1)	30 (1.2)	35 (1.4)	54 (2.1)	67 (2.6)	71 (2.8)	56 (2.2)	66 (2.6)	55 (2.2)	51 (2.0)	586 (23.1)
Average snowfall cm (inches)	14 (5.5)	14 (5.5)	4 (1.6)	0 (0)	0 (0)	0 (0)	0 (0)	0 (0)	0 (0)	0 (0)	3 (1.2)	8 (3.1)	43 (16.9)
Average rainy days	18	13	12	9	9	11	12	14	13	15	16	17	159
Source: Climatological statistics of Finland 1981–2010 Source 2: Foreca

== Demographics ==
=== Population ===
Historical population
Year	Pop.	±%
1900	13,482	—
1910	13,981	+3.7%
1920	13,928	−0.4%
1930	15,966	+14.6%
1940	18,230	+14.2%
1950	43,306	+137.6%
1960	52,542	+21.3%
1970	72,938	+38.8%
1980	78,405	+7.5%
1985	78,376	−0.0%
Source: City of Pori, Yearbook 2018

The city of Pori has 83,010 inhabitants, making it the 10th most populous municipality in Finland. The Pori region has 127,660 inhabitants, making it the eight most populous region in Finland. In Pori, 6% of the population has a foreign background, which is below to the national average.

The significant population increase in 1950 was the result of annexing nearby areas. Population peaked in the mid-1970s when it was over 80 000. After that, the population declined, and in recent years has remained steady at just over 83 000. After the annex of the neighbouring municipality Noormarkku in 2010 and Lavia in 2015 the population rose to the current level. In 1952 Pori was the fifth largest city in Finland after Helsinki, Turku, Tampere and Lahti.

Population size 1980–2025
Year	Population
1990	85,348
1995	85,620
2000	84,573
2005	84,455
2010	85,026
2015	85,363
2020	83,684
2025	83,010

=== Languages ===
Population by
mother tongue (2025)
1. Finnish (93.2%)
2. Russian (0.90%)
3. Ukrainian (0.70%)
4. Swedish (0.60%)
5. Sinhala (0.50%)
6. English (0.40%)
7. Arabic (0.40%)
8. Other (3.30%)

Pori is a monolingual Finnish-speaking municipality. The majority of the population, 77,357 persons (93.2%), spoke Finnish as their first language. In addition, the number of Swedish speakers was 460 persons (0.6%) of the population. Foreign languages were spoken by 6.3% of the population. As English and Swedish are compulsory school subjects, functional bilingualism or trilingualism acquired through language studies is not uncommon.

At least 40 different languages are spoken in Pori. The most commonly spoken foreign languages are Russian (1.0%), Ukrainian (0.6%), Arabic (0.4%) and English (0.4%).

=== Immigration ===
Population by country of birth (2025)
Country of birth	Population	%
Finland	77,513	93.7
Soviet Union	664	0.8
Sweden	432	0.5
Sri Lanka	413	0.5
Ukraine	335	0.4
Russia	258	0.3
Estonia	234	0.3
Thailand	200	0.2
China	183	0.2
Turkey	172	0.2
Other	2,996	3.6

As of 2024, there were 4,935 persons with a migrant background living in Pori, or 6% of the population. (Note: Statistics Finland classifies a person as having a "foreign background" if both parents or the only known parent were born abroad.) The number of residents who were born abroad was 5,176, or 6% of the population. The number of persons with foreign citizenship living in Pori was 3,723. Most foreign-born citizens came from the former Soviet Union, Sweden, Ukraine, Russia, Sri Lanka and Estonia. There is a Swedish School and a Swedish Culture Club that are aimed at serving the Finland-Swedish minority in the Satakunta region.

The relative share of immigrants in Pori's population is below to the national average. However, the city's new residents are increasingly of foreign origin. This will increase the proportion of foreign residents in the coming years.

=== Religion ===
In 2023, the Evangelical Lutheran Church was the largest religious group with 68.3% of the population of Pori. Other religious groups accounted for 1.9% of the population. 29.9% of the population had no religious affiliation.

== Politics ==
The largest parties in Pori are Social Democratic Party and National Coalition Party. In 2021 municipal elections the parties gained 21.5% and 20.4% of vote, respectively. The mayor of Pori is Lauri Inna, who was elected to run the city in 2022 after the former mayor, Aino-Maija Luukkonen, retired from the post.

== Transport ==
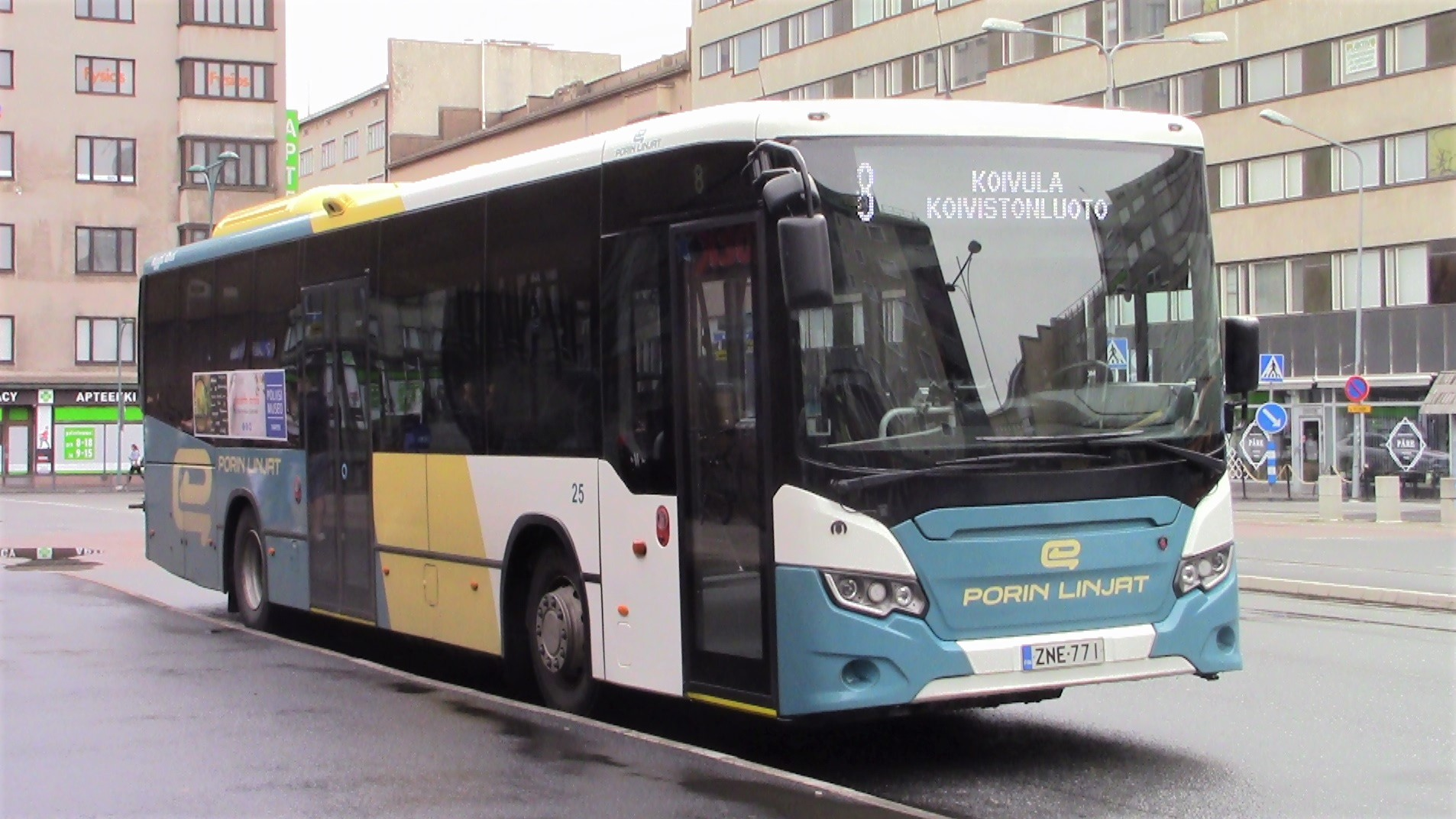
Public transportation bus

Pori railway station and bus station are located in the city center. Since the Pori station is a terminal train station, railway traffic is quite moderate. Pori is only connected to Tampere with 13 daily departures by the Tampere–Pori railway. Bus traffic is very busy instead. Pori has more than 100 intercity buses with major Finnish cities Helsinki, Turku and Tampere as well as smaller places like Rauma and Vaasa. Public transport is managed by the city owned bus company Porin Linjat. It has also service to nearby municipalities. The most significant highways from Pori to other cities are Highway 2 to Helsinki, Highway 8 (to south) to Turku and (to north) to Vaasa, Highway 11 to Tampere and Highway 23 to Jyväskylä.

Pori Airport has connections to Helsinki Airport.

Port of Pori is specialized on bulk cargo. It has liner service to several Northern European ports. In October 2013 Pori was the destination of MS Nordic Orion, the first commercial cargo ship ever to transit the Northwest Passage. She was carrying a cargo of coking coal from Port Metro Vancouver, Canada.

== Economy ==
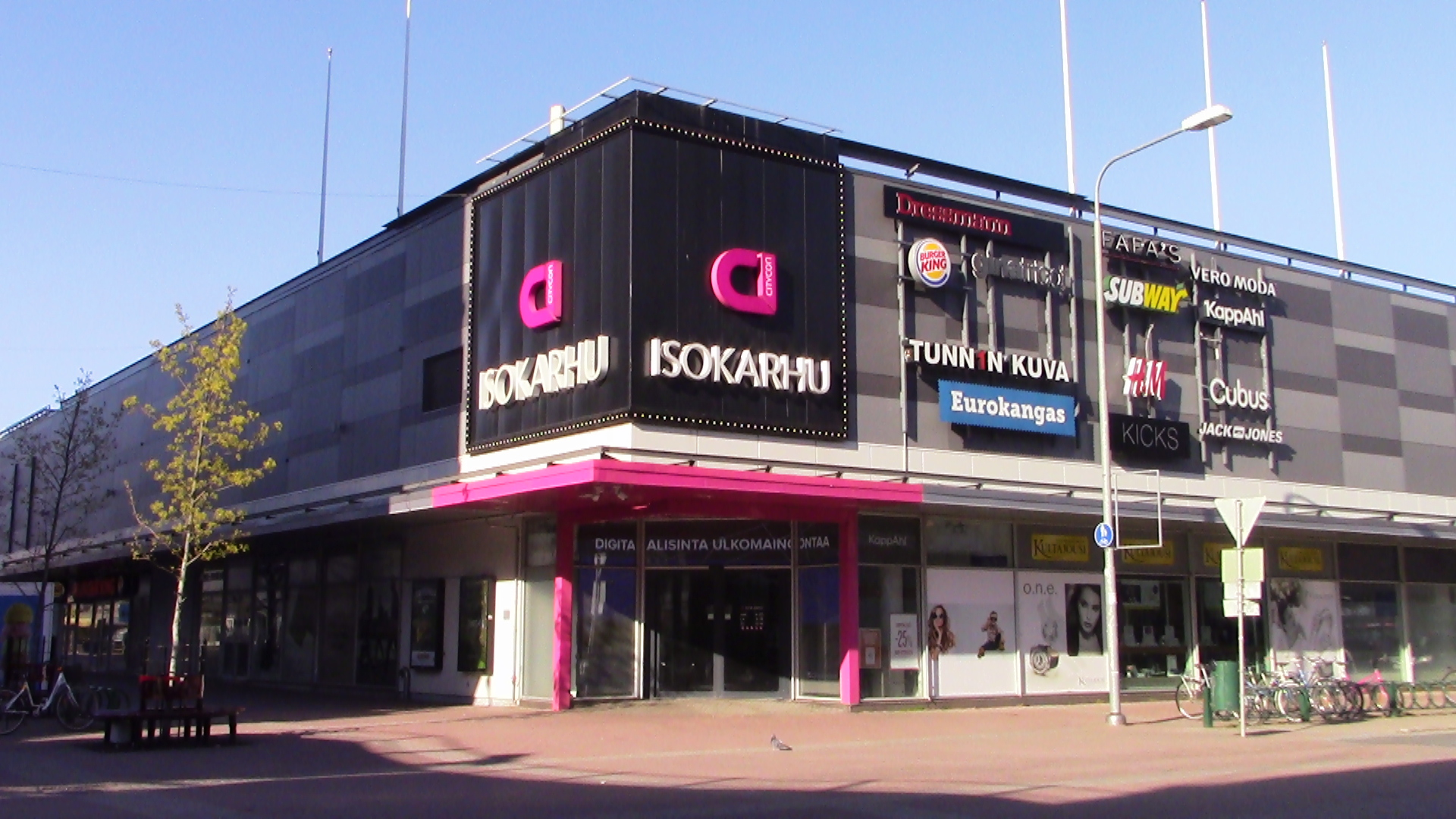
The IsoKarhu shopping center

There were 35,216 jobs in 2014. 7,548 residents of other municipalities worked in Pori and 5,710 Pori employees outside the city in 2014. The unemployment rate was 10.7% in May 2018.

The largest employer in Pori in terms of the number of employees in 2016 was the city of Pori with more than 5,000 employees. Other major employers include Technip and Satakunta University of Applied Sciences.

== Education ==
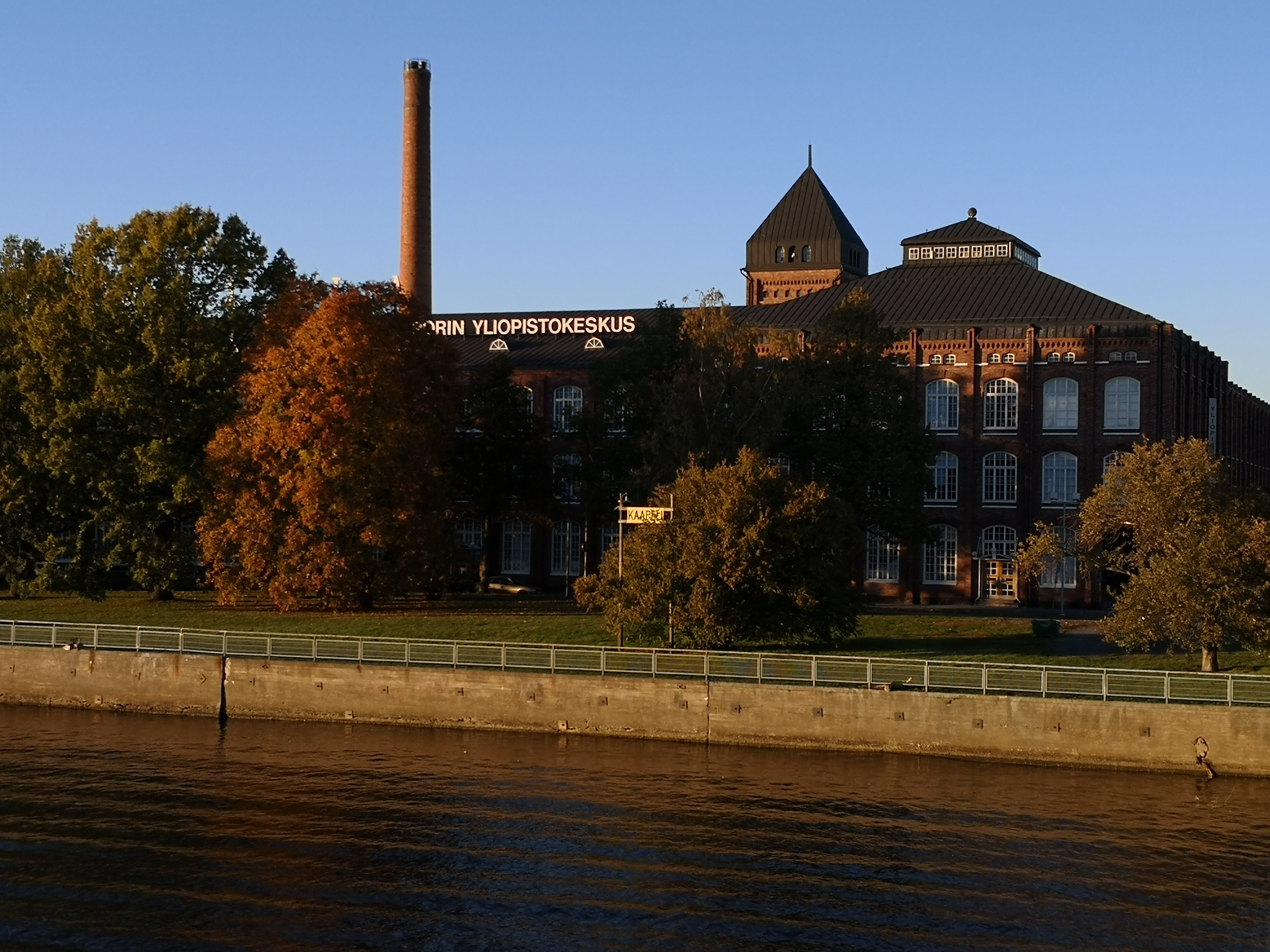
The University Consortium of Pori in its early October evening glory

Pori is the home of 28 comprehensive schools and 7 gymnasiums including English, French and German classes as well as the Swedish-speaking Björnebogs svenska samskola, Rudolf Steiner School and a Christian school. First Trivial school in Pori was founded in 1641. Today it is succeeded by Pori Lyceum established 1879. Vocational education is given in five institutes including the music school Palmgren Conservatory and Finnish Aviation Academy which is owned by the state of Finland and Finnish flag carrier airline Finnair.

Highest grades of education in Pori are the Satakunta University of Applied Sciences and University Consortium of Pori (UCPori).

== Culture ==
In 1987, the Art Association NYTE, an artist group and art association is founded.

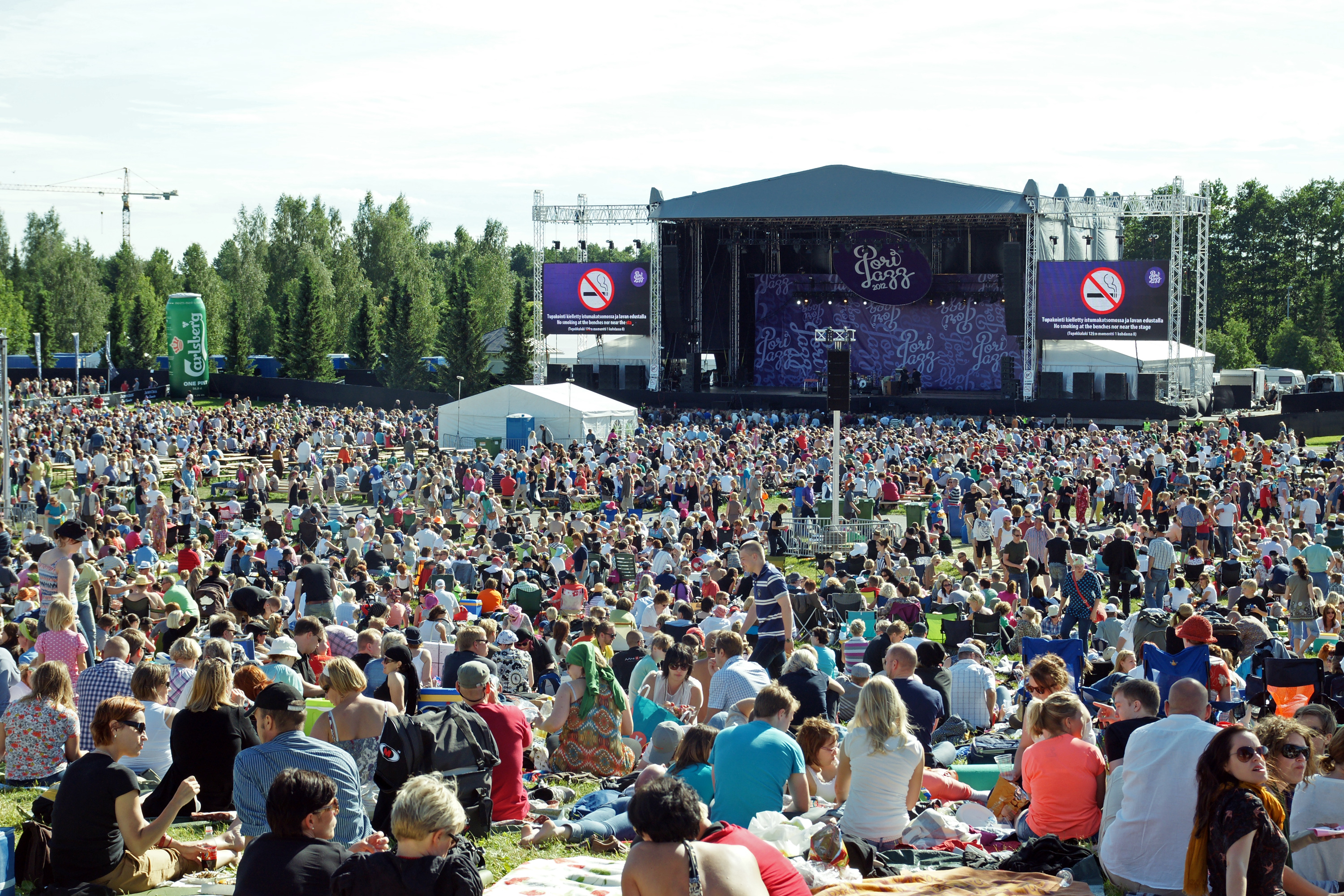
Pori Jazz 2012

=== Pori Jazz Festival ===
Pori is widely known for its international jazz music festival, established in 1966. Today Pori Jazz is one of the major jazz festivals in Europe as well as one of the largest culture events in Finland. The nine-day festival is held annually in July. Many renowned musicians have played the festival over the years, including artists like B. B. King, Ray Charles, Miles Davis, Keith Jarrett, Bob Dylan, Elton John, Kanye West and Santana.

Concert arenas are located around the city. Main venue is Kirjurinluoto Arena, which is an open-air concert park holding an audience more than 30,000. The arena has hosted also many other events like Sonisphere Festival in 2009 and 2010. SuomiAreena in an international public debate forum held simultaneously with Pori Jazz.

=== Theatre and music ===
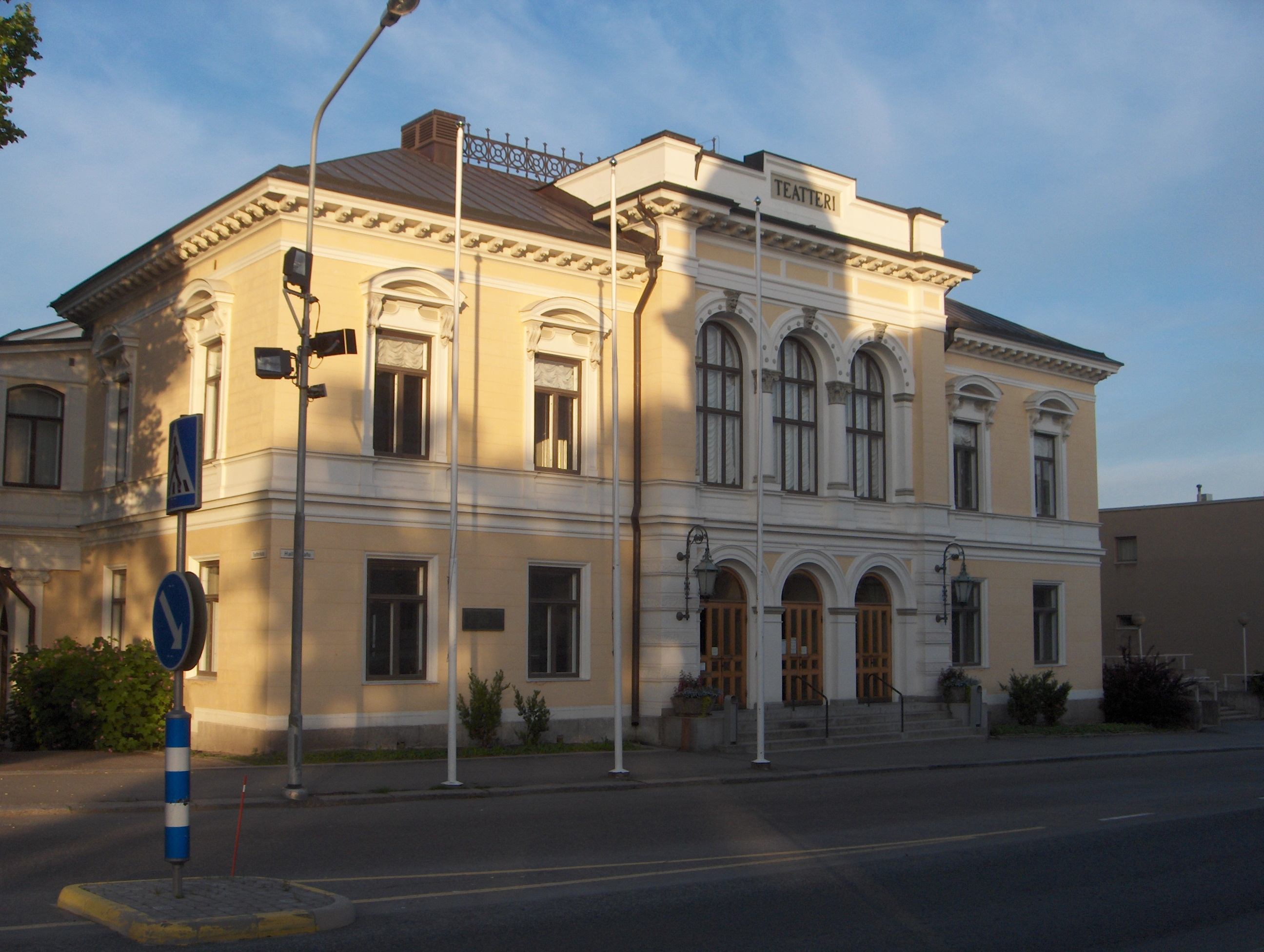
Pori Theatre

Pori is considered to be the birthplace of Finnish-language theatre as the Finnish National Theatre gave its first performance at Hotel Otava on October 13, 1872. Pori Theatre is a municipal theatre established in 1931 as a merger of two local stages. Theatre building was completed in 1884. Another professional theatre in Pori is Rakastajat-teatteri. It is also hosting an annual festival for independent theatre groups. Pori is a home for several amateur and youth theatres and the Kirjurinluoto Summer Theatre that presents open-air productions in summertime.

Pori Symphony Orchestra was established 1938 and it is today known as Pori Sinfonietta. The orchestra performs in 1999 built Promenadikeskus music hall. The first city orchestra was founded in 1877. In its early years the orchestra was mostly performing light orchestral music and its musicians were German. The very first symphony concert was played in 1902. Most famous classical composer from Pori is Selim Palmgren, even called as "The Finnish Chopin". Pori Opera was established in 1976. It performs a yearly production together with Pori Sinfonietta and Pori Opera Choir. In 2004 they recorded Kung Karls jakt which is the first opera composed in Finland.

Pori is known as one of the birthplaces of Finnish rock music, where the bands Dingo and Yö, among others, originate. With this, the concept of "Porirock" was born to define the music made by rock musicians from Pori.

=== Museums ===
Satakunta Museum is a historical museum established 1888. It is one of the oldest historical museums in Finland and presents the history of Satakunta province and the city of Pori. Museum building was completed in 1973. Pori Art Museum is a museum of contemporary and modern art. It was opened in 1979. Museum is based on the collections of local art collector and patronage Maire Gullichsen. Pori Art Museum is located in a former weigh house originally built in 1860. Other museums in Pori are the Rosenlew Museum which is presenting the industrial heritage of Rosenlew Company and the natural history museum Luontotalo Arkki. Toivo is the renovation center of Satakunta Museum. It presents traditional ways of restoring wooden houses with an exhibition of typical early 1900s home.

== Sport ==
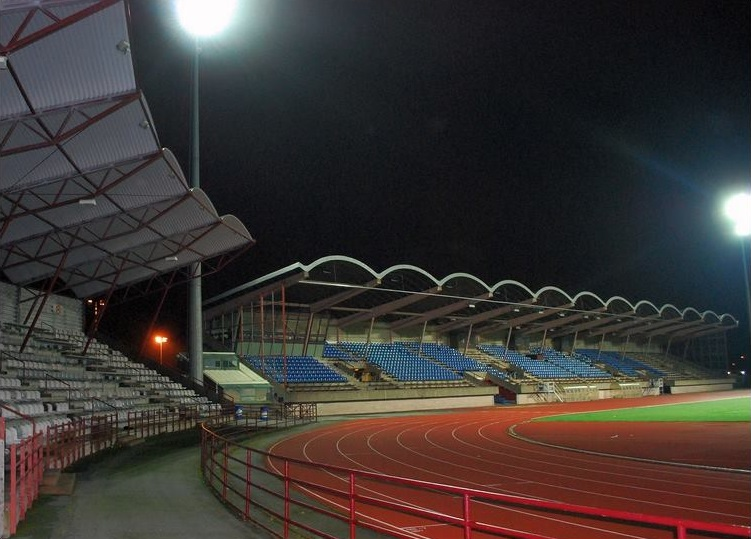
Pori Stadium

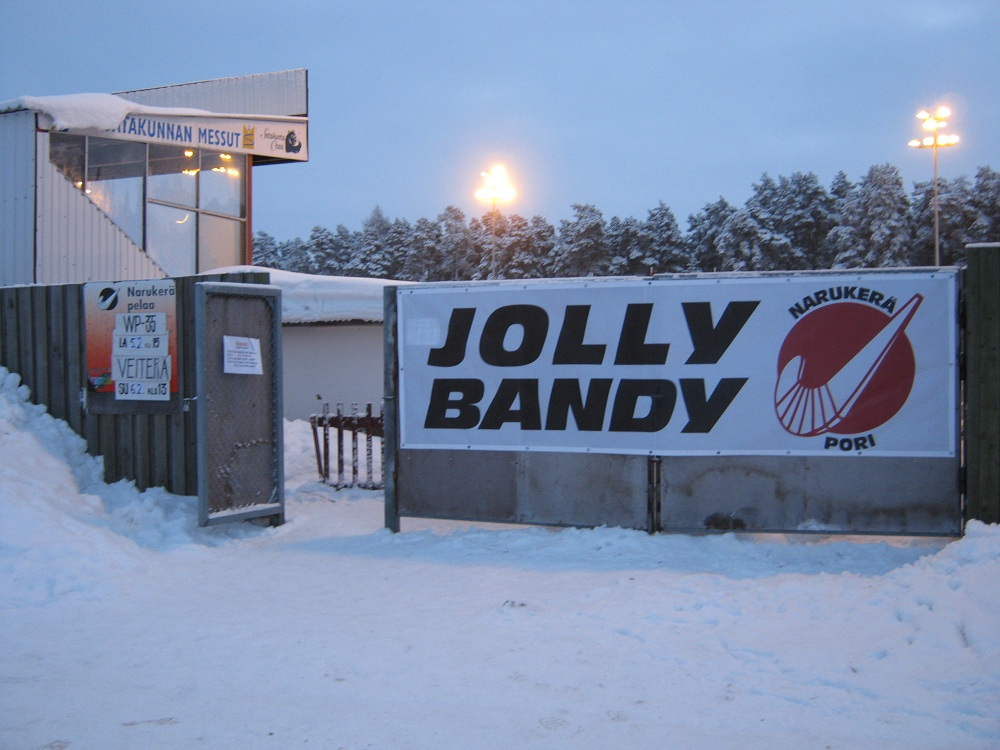
The bandy stadium entrance

Major team sports in Pori are ice hockey and football. Pori is especially known for its popular hockey team Ässät which is a three-time Finnish Champion, most recently in 2013. Their victory parade gathered some 20,000 people to the Pori market square. Local top football side FC Jazz have won the Finnish premier league Veikkausliiga in 1993 and 1996. The club has also competed in several UEFA competitions. As of 2024, FC Jazz plays in the third tier Ykkönen. Jazz's main rival and other local football team is Musan Salama which plays in fifth tier, Kolmonen.

Other popular team sports in Pori are bandy and pesäpallo, the Finnish version of baseball. Women's pesäpallo team Pesäkarhut and bandy side Narukerä are both playing in the premier divisions. Pori has also men's and women's lower division teams in almost all major team sports, including clubs like Pori Futsal (futsal), Bears (American football), Pori Rugby (rugby union) and FBT Karhut United (floorball). The oldest sportsclub in Finland, Segelföreningen i Björneborg, was established 1856 in Pori.

The biggest sports club in Pori is Liikuntaseura Pori, which offers multiple sports including gymnastics, TeamGym and cheerleading.

=== Sporting facilities ===
12,300 seated Pori Stadium, which is primarily used for athletics, is one of the largest multi-purpose stadiums in Finland. It is the former home ground for football clubs FC Jazz and NiceFutis. The stadium has also been a venue for two Finland internationals. Pori Stadium has hosted the Finnish Championships in Athletics three times and was the venue of 2015 games.

Stadium is located at the Isomäki sports center. The area includes several other facilities like the Isomäki Areena ice hockey arena for 6,000 spectators, an indoor football arena, a rink for bandy and skating, tennis courts and an outdoor swimming stadium. Pori Racetrack is one of the major horse racing venues in Finland.

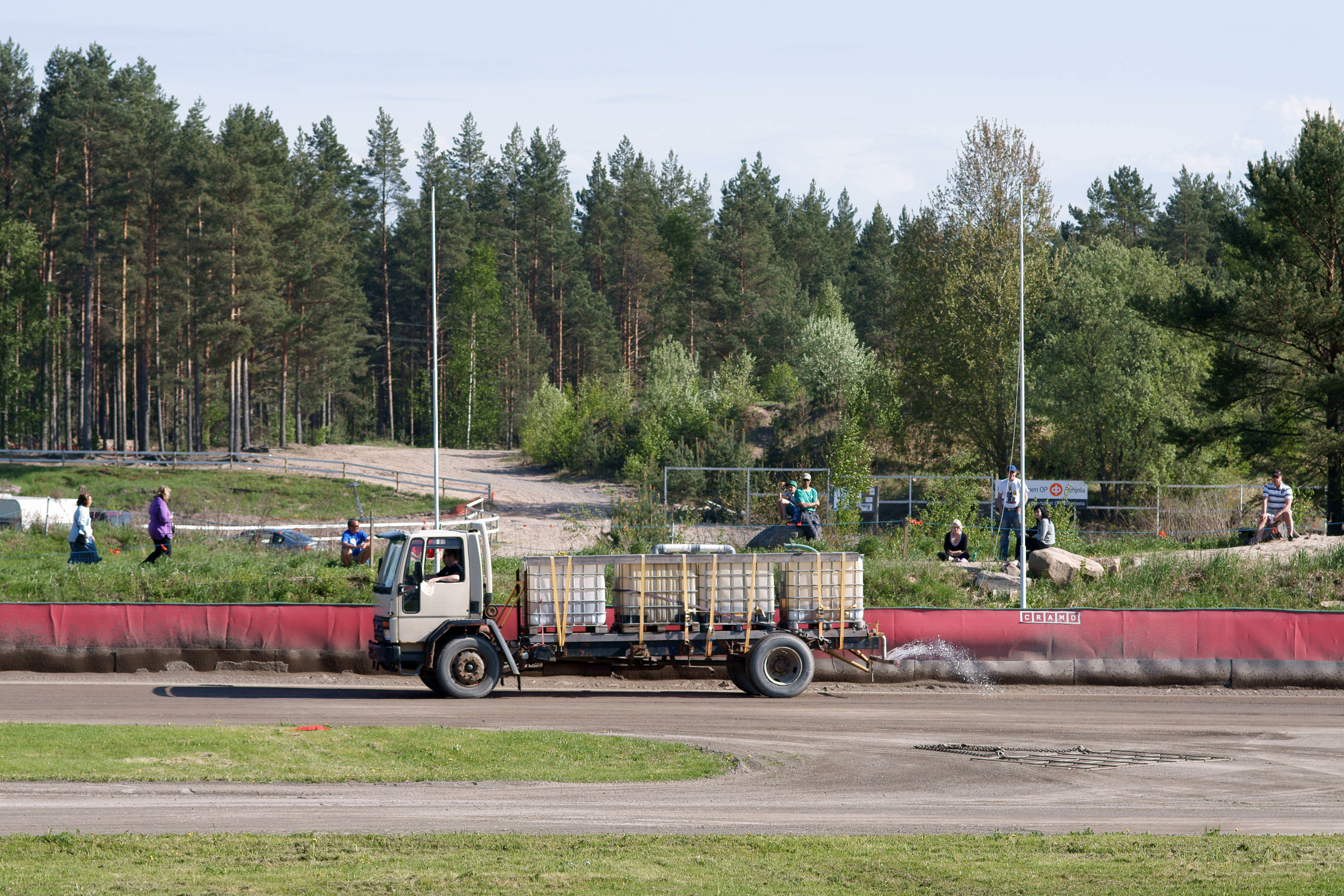
the speedway track in 2010

The motorcycle speedway track, Yyterin speedwaystadion is approximately 16 kilometres to the north off the Mäntyluodontie, the track has held the final of the Finnish Individual Speedway Championship six times from 1983 to 2019. Yyteri Golf is also located in this region. The other golf course, Pori Golf Club, is on the outskirts of the city.

The city-owned indoor swimming pool was opened in September 2011. It is a modern facility with seven pools of variable depth and size, three saunas and a gym.

=== Notable sportspeople ===
Olympic gold medal winners from Pori include Greco-Roman wrestler Kelpo Gröndahl (1952) and weightlifter Kaarlo Kangasniemi (1968). Leo-Pekka Tähti, five-time Paralympic gold medalist in category T54 sprint events (100m: 2004, 2008, 2012, 2016; 200m: 2004), is also from Pori. Other Olympic medalists from Pori are swimmer Arvo Aaltonen (1920), weightlifter Jouni Grönman (1984), boxers Joni Nyman (1984) and Jyri Kjäll (1992), pole vaulter Eeles Landström (1960), archer Kyösti Laasonen (1972) and ice hockey players Sakari Salminen (2014) and Sari Marjamäki (née Fisk, 1998). The best known, currently active athletes from Pori are swimmer Matti Mattsson, hurdler Nooralotta Neziri, NHL ice hockey goaltender Joonas Korpisalo and players Jesperi Kotkaniemi, Joel Armia and Erik Haula, and Paralympic gold medalist Leo-Pekka Tähti. Mikko Salo won the 2009 CrossFit Games in Aromas, California and was declared the "World's Fittest Man."

== Media ==
The most widely read daily newspaper of Pori area is the independent Satakunnan Kansa. Other local media were the politically-affiliated papers Uusi Aika, which was aligned with the Social Democrats, and Satakunnan Työ, which was aligned with the Left Alliance.

Radio Pori is a radio station established in 1985 as one of the first commercial stations in Finland. Eazy 101 was during 2012–2015 a local radio station mainly for younger people under 30. Public service radio in Pori area is Yle Satakunta, a regional station of Yle Radio Suomi. Yle TV2 screens daily local news from the Pori region and Satakunta province on its national channel.

== Points of interest ==
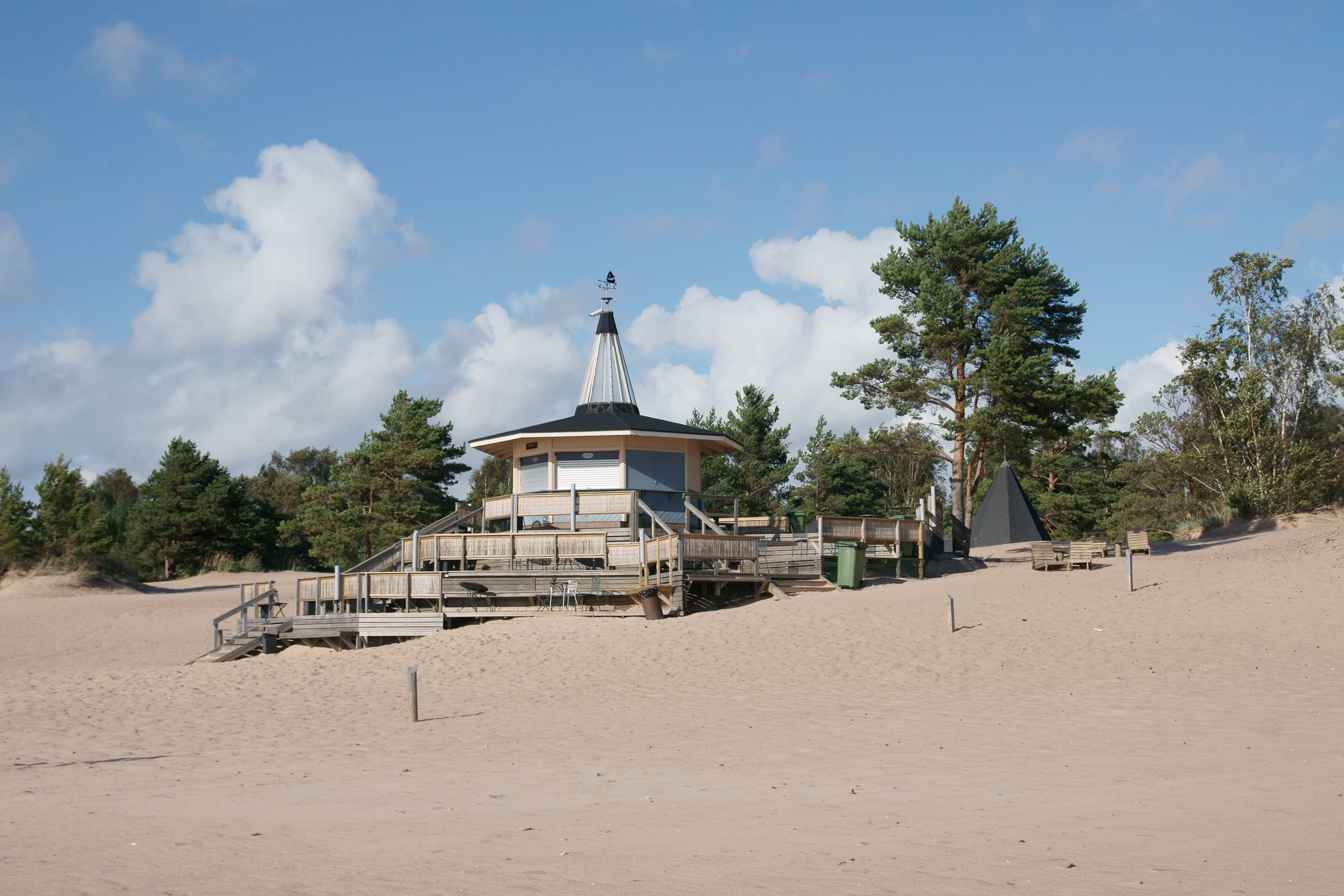
A bikini bar at the Yyteri Beach

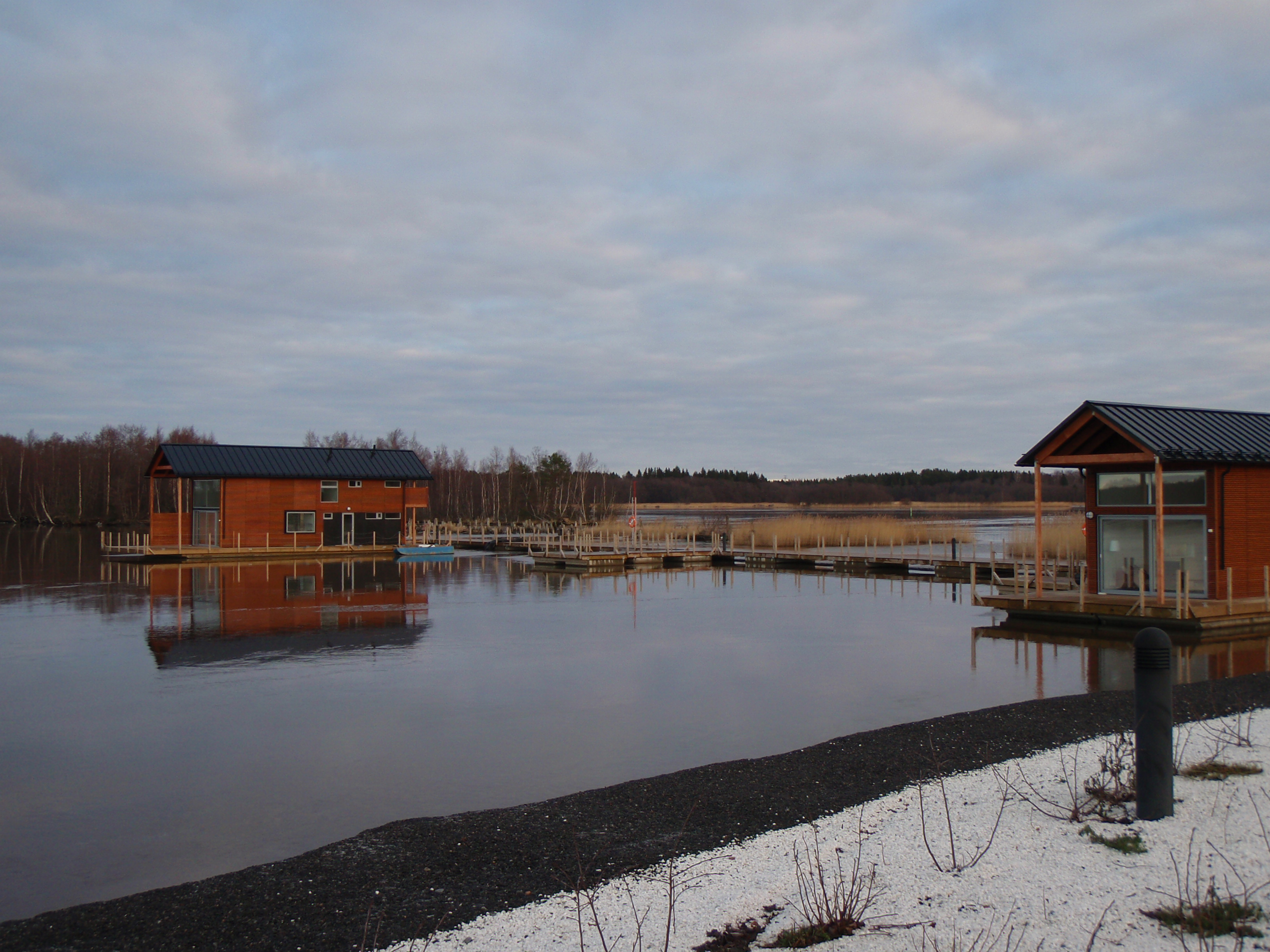
Houseboats at Reposaari, Pori

Yyteri Beach is located 17 kilometres out of the city center. The six-kilometre-long beach is one of the largest in Baltic Sea. Tourist facilities in Yyteri include a hotel/spa, camping/caravan park and a golf course. It is also very popular among windsurfers. Island of Reposaari is located some 10 kilometres further of Yyteri. It is connected with the mainland by highway. Reposaari is a unique village with a townscape of mostly wooden buildings and a population of 1,000 people. The island has a church, marina, hostel, camping site, several restaurants and a fishing port.

Juselius Mausoleum at the Käppärä Cemetery was built in 1901 for the 11-year-old daughter of businessman Fritz Arthur Jusélius. It is the only mausoleum in Finland. The building is decorated with frescoes by Akseli Gallen-Kallela who is one of Finland's most prominent painters. Kirjurinluoto is an island and park at the delta of river Kokemäenjoki by the city center. On the south side of the river stand the Empire style buildings of the "old town", raised after the 1852 city fire. 1841 built Old Town Hall is one of the few buildings saved from the fire. Central Pori Church and the Greek Orthodox Church of Pori dedicated to John the Theologian are the most notable churches. 10 kilometres outside the city at the municipality of Ulvila are the Medieval St. Olaf's Church and the 18th century ironworks of Leineperi.

Villa Mairea is a design of Finland's most famous architect Alvar Aalto. It is considered one of his most significant works. The villa is widely known all over the world among the ones interested in modern architecture. Villa Mairea is located in Noormarkku, a municipality annexed with Pori in 2010.

The northernmost district of Pori, Ahlainen, is a natural seaside village consisting of wooden houses. The Ahlainen's wooden church, built in 1796, is located in the district and is the oldest surviving church building in Pori. Eteläranta ("South Shore"), located along the Kokemäki River, is a value area of Pori, as the stone house blocks of the riverside landscape were built mostly after the Great Fire of Pori in 1852.

== Notable people ==
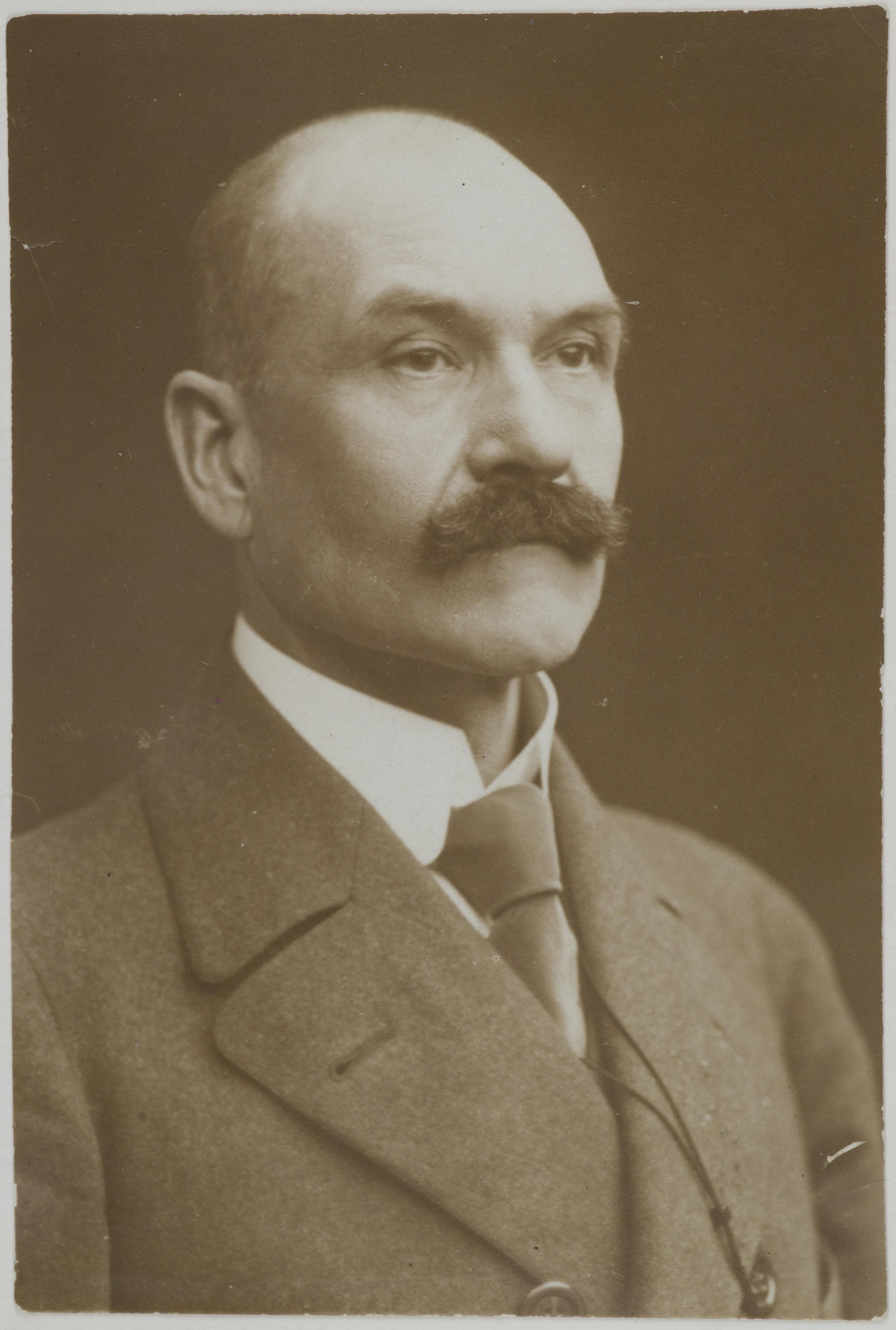
Akseli Gallen-Kallela

- Arvo Aaltonen (1892–1949), breaststroke swimmer and Olympic bronze medalist
- Lorenz Nikolai Achté (1835–1900), opera singer, composer, conductor and music teacher
- Joel Armia (born 1993), professional ice hockey player
- Nikita Bergenström (born 1965), criminal and triple murderer
- Tuure Boelius (born 2001), YouTuber, singer and actor
- Danny (born 1942), singer and guitarist
- Samuli Edelmann (born 1968), actor and singer
- Akseli Gallen-Kallela (1865–1931), painter
- Eino Grön (born 1939), singer
- Richard Hall (1860–1942), painter
- Jenni Haukio (born 1977), poet and First Lady of Finland
- Lotta Henttala (born 1989), racing cyclist
- Kari Hotakainen (born 1957), author
- Laura Huhtasaari (born 1979), politician
- Fritz Arthur Jusélius (1855–1930), industrialist and politician
- Krista Kiuru (born 1974), politician
- Timo Koivusalo (born 1963), film director, screenwriter, actor, columnist and musician
- Aleksandr Kokko (born 1987), football player
- Anna Kontula (born 1977), sociologist and politician
- Jesperi Kotkaniemi (born 2000), professional hockey player
- Olli Lindholm (1964–2019), singer and guitarist
- Kari Mäkinen (born 1955), archbishop
- Visa Mäkinen (born 1945), film director, producer, screenwriter and actor
- Nooralotta Neziri (born 1992), 100-meter hurdler
- Joonas Nordman (born 1986), actor, comedian, impersonator, director and screenwriter
- Niko Palonen (born 1989), professional ice hockey player
- Risto E. J. Penttilä (born 1959), businessman and politician
- Emil von Qvanten (1827–1903), poet, librarian, publisher and politician
- Miro Rahkola (born 1988), ice hockey player
- Marjatta Raita (1944–2007), actress
- Henry Saari (born 1964), actor, director and porn star
- Tero Saarinen (born 1964), dance artist and choreographer
- Sakari Salminen (born 1988), professional ice hockey player
- Johan Eberhard von Schantz (1802–1880), admiral, ship designer and explorer
- Kai Setälä (1913–2005), physician and professor
- Jorma Uotinen (born 1950), dancer, singer and choreographer

== International relations ==
=== Twin towns – Sister cities ===
Pori is twinned with:

- Bremerhaven, Germany, since 1967
- Eger, Hungary, since 1973
- Kołobrzeg, Poland, since 1975
- Mâcon, France, since 1990
- Porsgrunn, Norway, since 1956
- Riga, Latvia, since 1965
- Stralsund, Germany, since 1968
- Sundsvall, Sweden, since 1940
- Sønderborg, Denmark, since 1952
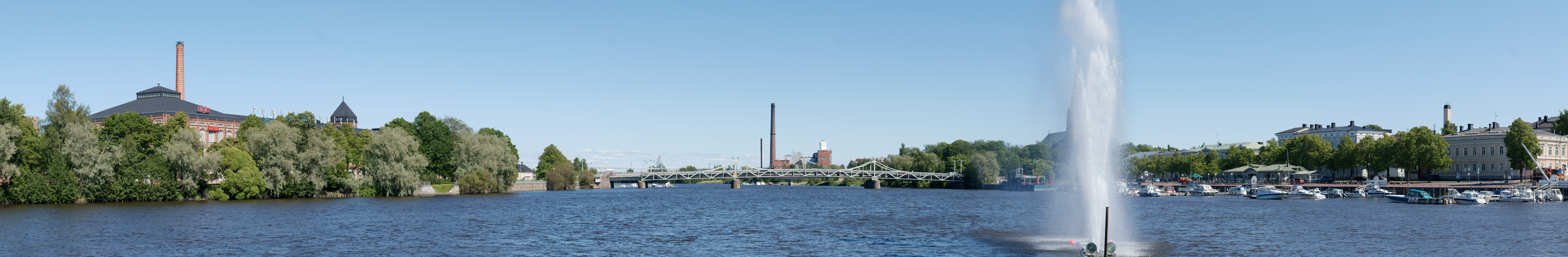
Panorama of Pori from Kirjurinluoto.

== See also ==
- Björneborgarnas marsch ("March of the Pori Regiment")
- Kokemäki River
- Lavia
- Pori Jazz
- Porilainen
- Tampere
- Turku
- Turku and Pori Province
- Ulvila
- Vaasa
