= Greatest Hits Tour (Elton John) =

2011–12 concert tour by Elton John

- World tour by Elton John
- Promotional poster for the tour
- Location: Asia • Europe • North America • Oceania • South America
- Start date: 14 February 2011
- End date: 21 September 2012
- Legs: 17
- No. of shows: 146

Elton John concert chronology
- The Union Tour (2010); Greatest Hits Tour (2011–12); 40th Anniversary of the Rocket Man (2012–13)

The Greatest Hits Tour was a concert tour by Elton John. The tour started in February 2011 in Victoria, British Columbia, Canada and visited the Americas, Europe, Asia, and Australasia. The tour was placed ninth by Pollstar for its "Top 50 Worldwide Tours (Mid-Year)", earning over $40 million with 57 shows.

== Background ==
The first edition of the tour took place in 2011 in Victoria, British Columbia. The tour then moved on through the United States with two of the concerts taking place in Hawaii.

The North American leg of the tour came to a close with five concerts in Canada. John played a total of twelve concerts in Canada over the course of the 2011 tour.

The tour moved onto Europe after the United States leg. The tour began in Cardiff, Wales. Due to high demand for tickets a second concert was added. The summer European leg of the tour came to a close in Hertfordshire, England with a performance at Magic Summer Live.

John and the band returned to Europe in November for six concerts in mainly taking place in Eastern Europe. This included John's first concert in Slovenia, which was originally planned to take place in July 2011 but was rescheduled.

Shortly after the European leg, John and the band briefly performed in Asia. Both of them were his debut performances in those countries. He performed in Indonesia and Malaysia for the first time.

John and the band then traveled to Australasia. John performed his first concert in Dunedin, New Zealand. This was the first concert that took place at the venue. John and the band then went on to perform their 15th tour of Australia in November and December 2011.

The tour was extended once again into 2012. The first concert was announced on 28 September 2011 via eltonjohn.com and took place at B2net Stadium in Chesterfield. More European shows in Germany were announced on 9 November 2011.

It was announced via eltonjohn.com on 26 October 2011: "Elton and the band will return to Honolulu's Blaisdell Arena on Friday, January 6, 2012, at 8pm, performing their Greatest Hits Live concert." A second date at the venue was announced due to high ticket demand.

It was announced on eltonjohn.com on 7 November 2011 that John would perform his first ever concert in Peru on 1 February 2012. John was supposed to perform a concert at the Sentul International Convention Center in Jakarta, Indonesia on 18 November 2011 but the concert was postponed until his 2012 Asian tour

== Opening acts ==
- 2Cellos (Europe, North America, Australia) (selected dates)
- Tim Bendzko (Germany 2011)
- Ed Drewett (Shrewsburg, Northampton & Hove)
- NEeMA (Lucca)
- Sofi Hellborg, Sing the Truth (Pori, Finland)
- Katie Thomson (Dunedin, New Zealand)
- Kara Gordon (Dunedin, New Zealand)
- Hokitika (Dunedin, New Zealand)
- Eran James (Hunter Valley, Australia & Adelaide, Australia)
- Tallia Storm (Falkirk)

== Set list ==
This set list is representative of the show in Lima. It does not represent all concerts throughout the tour.

1. "Saturday Night's Alright (For Fighting)"
2. "I'm Still Standing"
3. "Levon"
4. "Madman Across the Water"
5. "Holiday Inn"
6. "Tiny Dancer"
7. "Philadelphia Freedom"
8. "Goodbye Yellow Brick Road"
9. "Candle in the Wind"
10. "Rocket Man"
11. "I Guess That's Why They Call It the Blues"
12. "Hey Ahab"
13. "Gone to Shiloh"
14. "Monkey Suit"
15. "Sacrifice"
16. "Honky Cat"
17. "Daniel"
18. "Sorry Seems to Be the Hardest Word"
19. "Don't Let the Sun Go Down on Me"
20. "The Bitch Is Back"
21. "Are You Ready for Love"
22. "Bennie and the Jets"
23. "Crocodile Rock"
  Encore
24. "Your Song"
25. "Nikita"

== Tour dates ==
Date	City	Country	Venue
North America
14 February 2011	Victoria	Canada	Save-On-Foods Memorial Centre
15 February 2011	Victoria	Canada	Save-On-Foods Memorial Centre
17 February 2011	Eugene	United States	Matthew Knight Arena
19 February 2011	Reno	United States	Reno Events Center
24 February 2011	Kahului	United States	Maui Arts And Cultural Center
25 February 2011	Kahului	United States	Maui Arts And Cultural Center
11 March 2011	Uncasville	United States	Mohegan Sun Arena
12 March 2011	Worcester	United States	DCU Center
16 March 2011	New York City	United States	Madison Square Garden
18 March 2011	Norfolk	United States	Ted Constant Convocation Center
20 March 2011	New York City	United States	Madison Square Garden
23 March 2011	Pittsburgh	United States	Consol Energy Center
25 March 2011	Philadelphia	United States	Wells Fargo Center
26 March 2011	Baltimore	United States	1st Mariner Arena
27 March 2011	University Park	United States	Bryce Jordan Center
6 April 2011	Bismarck	United States	Bismarck Civic Center
8 April 2011	Spokane	United States	Spokane Veterans Memorial Arena
9 April 2011	Boise	United States	Taco Bell Arena
10 April 2011	Billings	United States	Rimrock Auto Arena at MetraPark
12 April 2011*	Denver	United States	Wells Fargo Theatre
15 April 2011	Louisville	United States	KFC Yum! Center
16 April 2011	Springfield	United States	JQH Arena
17 April 2011	Peoria	United States	Carver Arena
22 April 2011	Wilkes-Barre	United States	Mohegan Sun Arena at Casey Plaza
23 April 2011	Rochester	United States	Blue Cross Arena
3 May 2011	Sioux City	United States	Gateway Arena
4 May 2011	La Crosse	United States	La Crosse Center
6 May 2011	Duluth	United States	AMSOIL Arena
7 May 2011	Winnipeg	Canada	MTS Centre
10 May 2011	Saskatoon	Canada	Credit Union Centre
11 May 2011	Regina	Canada	Brandt Centre
12 May 2011	Regina	Canada	Brandt Centre
14 May 2011	Calgary	Canada	Scotiabank Saddledome
Europe
5 June 2011*	Scarborough	England	Scarborough Open Air Theatre
8 June 2011	Cardiff	Wales	Motorpoint Arena Cardiff
9 June 2011	Cardiff	Wales	Motorpoint Arena Cardiff
10 June 2011	Glasgow	Scotland	Scottish Exhibition and Conference Centre
12 June 2011	Shrewsbury	England	Greenhous Meadow
14 June 2011	Munich	Germany	Olympiahalle
16 June 2011*	Douglas	Isle of Man	Nobles Park
17 June 2011	Leipzig	Germany	Volkerschlachtdenkmal
18 June 2011	Berlin	Germany	O_{2} World Berlin
19 June 2011	Cologne	Germany	Lanxess Arena
21 June 2011	Hanover	Germany	TUI Arena
22 June 2011	Mannheim	Germany	SAP Arena
25 June 2011	Northampton	England	Northampton County Cricket Ground
26 June 2011	Hove	England	Hove County Cricket Ground
28 June 2011^{[A]}	Cork	Ireland	The Docklands
1 July 2011	Freiburg	Germany	Messe Freiburg Open Air
5 July 2011	Istanbul	Turkey	Küçükçiftlik Park
6 July 2011	Ankara	Turkey	Ankara Arena
North America
9 July 2011^{[B]}	Quebec City	Canada	Plains of Abraham
Europe
12 July 2011	Padua	Italy	Anfiteatro Camerini
13 July 2011^{[C]}	Rome	Italy	Auditorium Parco della Musica
14 July 2011^{[D]}	Lucca	Italy	Piazza Napoleone
16 July 2011^{[E]}	Pori	Finland	Kirjurinluoto Arena
17 July 2011^{[F]}	Hatfield	England	Hatfield House
North America
3 September 2011	Bethel	United States	Bethel Woods Center for the Arts
4 September 2011	Saratoga Springs	United States	Saratoga Performing Arts Center
7 September 2011	Noblesville	United States	Verizon Wireless Music Center
8 September 2011	Cuyahoga Falls	United States	Blossom Music Center
9 September 2011*	Oshawa	Canada	General Motors Centre
10 September 2011*	Windsor	Canada	WFCU Centre
13 September 2011*	Sydney	Canada	Centre 200
14 September 2011*	Summerside	Canada	Consolidated Credit Union Place
15 September 2011*	Summerside	Canada	Consolidated Credit Union Place
21 September 2011*^{[G]}	Austin	United States	Moody Theater
South America
23 September 2011^{[H]}	Rio de Janeiro	Brazil	Parque Olímpico Cidade do Rock
Europe
3 November 2011	Riga	Latvia	Arena Riga
4 November 2011	Vilnius	Lithuania	Siemens Arena
7 November 2011	Saint Petersburg	Russia	Ice Palace Saint Petersburg
8 November 2011	Kyiv	Ukraine	Kyiv Palace of Sports
11 November 2011	Ljubljana	Slovenia	Arena Stožice
14 November 2011	Moscow	Russia	Crocus City Hall
Asia
20 November 2011	Singapore		Singapore Indoor Stadium
22 November 2011	Genting Highlands	Malaysia	Arena of Stars
Oceania
25 November 2011	Dunedin	New Zealand	Forsyth Barr Stadium
26 November 2011	Sydney	Australia	Lyric Theatre
27 November 2011	Sydney	Australia	Lyric Theatre
30 November 2011	Brisbane	Australia	Brisbane Entertainment Centre
3 December 2011	Hunter Valley	Australia	Hope Estate Winery Amphitheatre
4 December 2011	Hunter Valley	Australia	Hope Estate Winery Amphitheatre
6 December 2011	Melbourne	Australia	Rod Laver Arena
7 December 2011	Melbourne	Australia	Rod Laver Arena
9 December 2011	Adelaide	Australia	Coopers Brewery Amphitheatre
11 December 2011	Perth	Australia	Burswood Dome
6 January 2012	Honolulu	United States	Neal S. Blaisdell Center
7 January 2012	Honolulu	United States	Neal S. Blaisdell Center
South America
1 February 2012	Lima	Peru	Estadio Nacional
North America
3 February 2012	San José	Costa Rica	Estadio Ricardo Saprissa Aymá
4 February 2012*	Panama City	Panama	Figali Convention Center
South America
5 February 2012	Caracas	Venezuela	Estadio de Fútbol Universidad Simón Bolívar
North America
24 February 2012	Zapopan	Mexico	Estadio Omnilife
6 March 2012	Augusta	United States	James Brown Arena
7 March 2012	North Charleston	United States	North Charleston Coliseum
9 March 2012	Sunrise	United States	BankAtlantic Center
10 March 2012	Orlando	United States	Amway Center
13 March 2012	Estero	United States	Germain Arena
15 March 2012	Roanoke	United States	Roanoke Civic Center
16 March 2012	Raleigh	United States	RBC Center
17 March 2012	Richmond	United States	Richmond Coliseum
20 March 2012	Evansville	United States	Ford Center
21 March 2012	Kalamazoo	United States	Wings Stadium
22 March 2012	Madison	United States	Alliant Energy Center
24 March 2012	Grand Forks	United States	Ralph Engelstad Arena
21 April 2012*	Fort Wayne	United States	Allen County War Memorial Coliseum
22 April 2012*	Mankato	United States	Verizon Wireless Center
24 April 2012*	Lethbridge	Canada	ENMAX Centre
25 April 2012*	Red Deer	Canada	ENMAX Centrium
26 April 2012*	Grande Prairie	Canada	Canada Games Arena
Europe
1 June 2012^{[I]}	Wetzlar	Germany	Hessentagsarena
3 June 2012	Taunton	England	Taunton County Ground
4 June 2012^{[J]}	London	England	Buckingham Palace
5 June 2012	Harrogate	England	Great Yorkshire Showground
7 June 2012	Belfast	Northern Ireland	Odyssey Arena
9 June 2012	Chesterfield	England	B2net Stadium
10 June 2012	Falkirk	Scotland	Falkirk Stadium
13 June 2012	Newcastle	England	Metro Radio Arena
15 June 2012	Birmingham	England	LG Arena
16 June 2012^{[K]}	Blackpool	England	Blackpool Tower Promenade
20 June 2012	Nice	France	Palais Nikaïa
22 June 2012	Lyon	France	Halle Tony Garnier
29 June 2012	Ludwigslust	Germany	Schloss Ludwigslust
30 June 2012^{[L]}	Kyiv	Ukraine	Maidan Nezalezhnosti
2 July 2012^{[M]}	Ibiza	Spain	The Sunset Strip
3 July 2012	Oberhausen	Germany	König Pilsener Arena
4 July 2012	Augustenborg	Denmark	Augustenborg Slotspark
7 July 2012	Łódź	Poland	Atlas Arena
10 July 2012	Bratislava	Slovakia	Ondrej Nepela Arena
12 July 2012^{[N]}	Locarno	Switzerland	Piazza Grande Locarno
13 July 2012*^{[O]}	Zürich	Switzerland	Dolder Kunsteisbahn am Adlisberg
14 July 2012	Würzburg	Germany	Residenzplatz
18 July 2012	Tüßling	Germany	Schloss Tüßling
20 July 2012	Ulm	Germany	Münsterplatz
21 July 2012^{[P]}	Nîmes	France	Arena of Nîmes
North America
7 September 2012*	Sarnia	Canada	RBC Centre
11 September 2012	Jackson	United States	Mississippi Coliseum
12 September 2012	Huntsville	United States	Von Braun Center
14 September 2012	Tampa	United States	USF Sun Dome
15 September 2012	Savannah	United States	Savannah Civic Center
16 September 2012	Johnson City	United States	Freedom Hall Civic Center
18 September 2012	Wheeling	United States	WesBanco Arena
19 September 2012*	Peterborough	Canada	Peterborough Memorial Centre
Europe
21 September 2012^{[Q]}	London	England	Wembley Arena

- *Denotes an Elton John solo concert

Festivals and other miscellaneous performances

^{A} This concert was a part of "Live at the Marquee"
^{B} This concert was a part of the Festival d'été de Québec
^{C} This concert was a part of "Luglio Suona Bene"
^{D} This concert was a part of the "Summer Festival Lucca"
^{E} This concert was a part of "Pori Jazz"
^{F} This concert was a part of "Magic Summer Live"
^{G} This concert was a part of the "Benefit for the Andy Roddick Foundation"
^{H} This concert was a part of "Rock in Rio IV"
^{I} This concert is a part of "Hessentag"

^{J} This concert is a part of Diamond Jubilee Concert
^{K} This concert is a part of "Tower Festival Headland"
^{L} This concert is a part of the "Your Life is Not a Game. Let's Stop AIDS Together!"
^{M} This concert is a part of the "Ibiza 123 Festival"
^{N} This concert is a part of the "Moon & Stars Festival"
^{O} This concert is a part of "Live at Sunset"
^{P} This concert is a part of "Festival de Nîmes"
^{Q} This concert is a part of "Peace One Day Concert 2012"

Cancellations and rescheduled shows

19 April 2011	La Crosse, Wisconsin	La Crosse Center	Rescheduled to 4 May 2011
23 June 2011	Freiburg, Germany	Messe Freiburg Open Air	Rescheduled to 1 July 2011
2 July 2011	Izola, Slovenia	Mestni Stadion Izola	Rescheduled to 11 November 2011 and moved to Arena Stožice in Ljubljana.
3 July 2011	Zagreb, Croatia	Arena Zagreb	Cancelled
5 July 2011	Budva, Montenegro	Amphitheater Sveti Stefan	Cancelled. This concert was a part of the Budva City Theater Festival.
27 August 2011	The Hague, Netherlands	Scheveningen Beach	Cancelled. This concert was a part of the Royal Beach Concert.
1 September 2011	Lima, Peru	Explanada del Monumental	Cancelled
13 September 2011	Clarkston, Michigan	DTE Energy Music Theatre	Cancelled
16 September 2011	Camden, New Jersey	Susquehanna Bank Center	Cancelled
18 November 2011	Bogor, Indonesia	SICC Auditorium	Rescheduled to 17 November 2012 and moved to the Mata Elang International Stadium
12 June 2012	Ludwigslust, Germany	Schloss Ludwigslust	Rescheduled to 29 June 2012
8 July 2012	Gdańsk, Poland	Ergo Arena	Cancelled
8 September 2012*	Peterborough, Ontario	Peterborough Memorial Centre	Rescheduled to 19 September 2012
22 September 2012	Amsterdam, Netherlands	Ziggo Dome	Cancelled

=== Box office score data ===
Venue	City	Tickets sold / available	Gross revenue
Maui Arts and Cultural Center	Kahului, Hawaii	11,394 / 11,394 (100%)	$1,588,241
Mohegan Sun Arena	Uncasville, Connecticut	6,158 / 6,158 (100%)	$1,076,890
Madison Square Garden	New York City	36,338 / 36,338 (100%)	$3,471,360
Ted Constant Convocation Center	Norfolk, Virginia	8,335 / 8,335 (100%)	$892,075
Bryce Jordan Center	University Park, Pennsylvania	12,818 / 12,818 (100%)	$810,595
Civic Center	Bismarck, North Dakota	8,813 / 8,813 (100%)	$792,825
Veterans Memorial Arena	Spokane, Washington	11,604 / 11,604 (100%)	$1,011,298
Taco Bell Arena	Boise, Idaho	12,688 / 12,688 (100%)	$811,328
Rimrock Auto Arena	Billings, Montana	10,352 / 10,352 (100%)	$908,661
Carver Arena	Peoria, Illinois	10,542 / 11,000 (96%)	$1,000,142
Gateway Arena	Sioux City, Iowa	8,074 / 8,074 (100%)	$895,975
La Crosse Center	La Crosse, Wisconsin	6,416 / 6,516 (98%)	$668,692
AMSOIL Arena	Duluth, Minnesota	7,698 / 7,698 (100%)	$794,300
O_{2} World	Berlin, Germany	9,276 / 11,696 (79%)	$843,143
General Motors Centre	Oshawa, Ontario	7,327 / 7,327 (100%)	$1,016,440
Centre 200	Sydney, Nova Scotia	6,447 / 6,500 (99%)	$912,908
Consolidated Credit Union Place	Summerside, Prince Edward Island	11,409 / 11,409 (100%)	$1,512,040
Entertainment Centre	Brisbane, Australia	12,227 / 12,795 (95%)	$2,318,140
Rod Laver Arena	Melbourne, Australia	22,233 / 22,466 (99%)	$3,684,280
Blaisdell Arena	Honolulu, Hawaii	13,822 / 13,822 (100%)	$1,247,710
Auditorio Nacional	Mexico City, Mexico	18,916 / 19,274 (98%)	$1,542,640
Ricardo Saprissa Stadium	San José, Costa Rica	12,363 / 14,000 (88%)	$1,068,300
Figali Convention Center	Panama City, Panama	2,990 / 3,500 (85%)	$468,647
Estadio de Fútbol Universidad Simón Bolívar	Caracas, Venezuela	4,793 / 5,000 (96%)	$1,994,300
BankAtlantic Center	Sunrise, Florida	14,049 / 15,197 (92%)	$1,237,318
Wings Stadium	Kalamazoo, Michigan	6,220 / 6,220 (100%)	$638,635
Alliant Energy Center	Madison, Wisconsin	8,674 / 8,674 (100%)	$644,996
Allen County War Memorial Coliseum	Fort Wayne, Indiana	11,740 / 11,740 (100%)	$1,026,660
Verizon Wireless Center	Mankato, Minnesota	6,921 / 6,921 (100%)	$763,075
USF Sun Dome	Tampa, Florida	10,009 / 10,009 (100%)	$906,665
Total		330,646 / 338,338 (98%)	$36,548,279

== Personnel ==
- Elton John – piano, vocals
- Davey Johnstone – guitar, banjo, backing vocals
- Bob Birch – bass guitar, backing vocals
- Matt Bissonette – bass guitar, backing vocals (11–21 September 2012)
- Kim Bullard – keyboards
- Nigel Olsson – drums, backing vocals
- John Mahon – percussion, backing vocals
- Stjepan Hauser – cello
- Luka Sulic – cello
- Lisa Stone – backing vocals
- Rose Stone – backing vocals
- Tata Vega – backing vocals
- Jean Witherspoon – backing vocals
