= Pori National Urban Park =

Park in Pori, Finland

The Pori National Urban Park, located in the town of Pori, Finland, was established in May 2002 and is part of the NUP network. NUPs (National Urban Parks) are integrated urban spaces that span across several areas. Pori NUP is recognised as being of national importance with a valuable local natural and cultural environment. The most prominent monuments are the industrial buildings on the north bank of the Kokemäenjoki, the Neo-gothic Central church of Pori, and the Junnelius palace, a neo-Renaissance building which is currently used as the City Hall. The National Urban Park also contains the Pori bridge; the Old Courthouse; "stone Pori", a collection of stone buildings; the Juselius Mausoleum, and Kirjurinluoto island, where the Pori Jazz Festival takes place.

== Green corridor through the town ==
The Pori National Urban Park forms a single green corridor traversing the city from the Kokemäenjoki river delta, through the city center to the Isomäki open-air sports complex, on to the countryside surrounding the town. The park juxtaposes built-up sections of the city, natural parks, play areas, and elements of cultural landscape.

== History ==
The Pori National Urban Park was established on the 6th of May 2002. It is meant to designate a coherent space of valuable parks, green spaces and cultural environments in Pori, stretching directly from the city centre to the sea and the forest. The area distinguishes itself by the remnants of the villa community of early twentieth-century workers "summer homes". An example of an English-style park, Kirjurinluoto, which has been the recreational area for Pori people for over a century. In 1996, a beach was added, along with the Pelle Hermanni children’s playground. Kirjurinluoto has been the site of the Pori Jazz festival since 1966. The park complex is being expanded towards the Kirjurinluoto Arena, on Raatimiehenluoto. Kirjurinluoto is connected to the city center by the pontoon bridge Taavi. The Pormestari bridge, completed in the summer of 2001, connects Kirjurinluoto to the Pormestarinluoto and Isosanta districts of Pori.

== Presence of nature ==
The Kokemäenjoki river flows through the middle of the Pori National Urban Park, and from its northern side, the river flows out towards the sea into the widest river delta of the Nordic countries. The riverbank groves reach right up to the town centre, whose crisscross boulevards are known for providing a nesting place for rooks. To the south, the urban park is connected directly with the surrounding countryside.

The islands are known for their captive bird populations, including peacocks, different species of pheasants, collared turtle-doves, as well as wild species.

== Industrial history of the North bank ==
Industrialization gave rise to a heritage of buildings along the riverbank, which have been well preserved. The north bank of the Kokemäenjoki is dominated by the redbrick building of the cotton mill. Large-scale industry has, however, partly given way after the period of industrialization, to make room for a thriving center of excellence, containing the university center of Pori.

== Eteläranta ==
The stone buildings on the south bank of the river Kokemäenjoki, with their administrative buildings and the boulevards that dissect the center, tell of numerous fires in the city and of the set of values of that time. "Kivi-Pori" (stone Pori), built in the spirit of the neo-renaissance, is a cultural environment of national significance.

== Avenues ==
The key features of the urban park – the tree-lined avenues, which crisscross the center of Pori – have been a feature of the city's structure since the fire of 1852. The pedestrianized area in the town center, Promenadi-Pori, which has been developed since the 1970s, is now complemented by the national urban park of Pori.

== The underpass tunnel ==
The old wooden railway station of Pori is located at the end of Länsipuisto (West Avenue) and the present railway station, built in the functional style, lies to the south. The underpass tunnel, sometimes referred to as "The Portal" was completed in 1998 and connects the southern and northern areas of the urban park. The length of the zone is 11 km and at the point of the central avenues the zone measures almost 3 km in the east-west direction. The width of the urban park varies from a kilometer at the islands and the forest of Pori, to only a hundred meters at the central avenues. The narrowest point of the urban park is as it passes below the railway and highway 2 along the Portal. The total surface area of the park is about 9.5 km².
