= Finnish jazz =

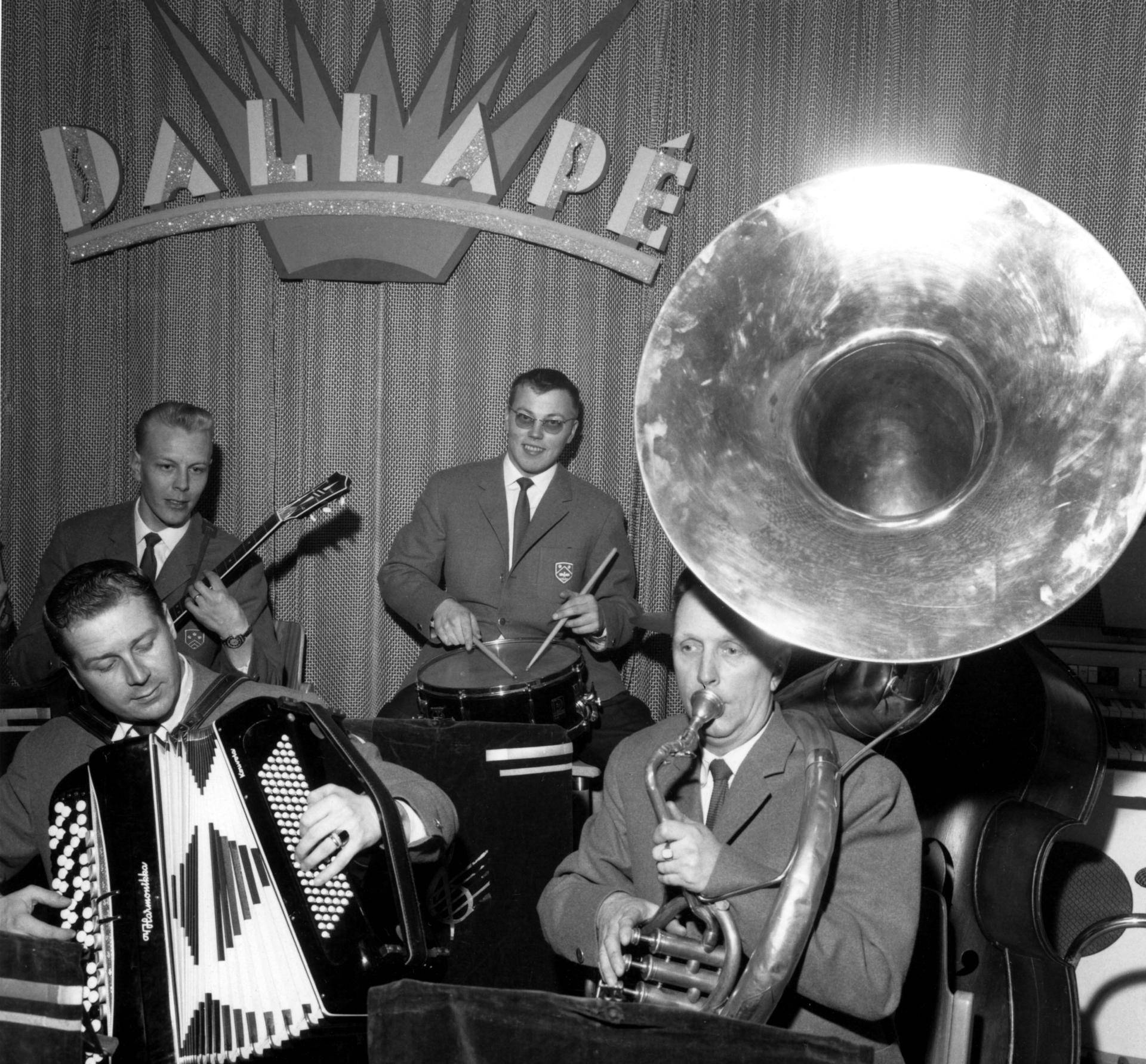
Dallapé rehearsing in 1962.

Finnish jazz has been created at least since the 1920s. The meaning of Finnish jazz was initially somewhat vague: people often called any Finnish music played with drums "jazz". Finnish jazz nevertheless started to develop noticeably in the late 1920s, with Finnish jazz musicians adding several elements of American jazz into their repertoire. In the 1960s Finnish jazz started to have a more original sound, mixing original American jazz with Finnish influences. During the 1990s Finnish jazz became more professional and internationally recognised than ever. The latest development to Finnish jazz is the nu jazz movement.

== Musicians ==
- Dallapé
- Onni Gideon
- Matti Oiling
- Pekka Pohjola
- Severi Pyysalo

== Festivals ==
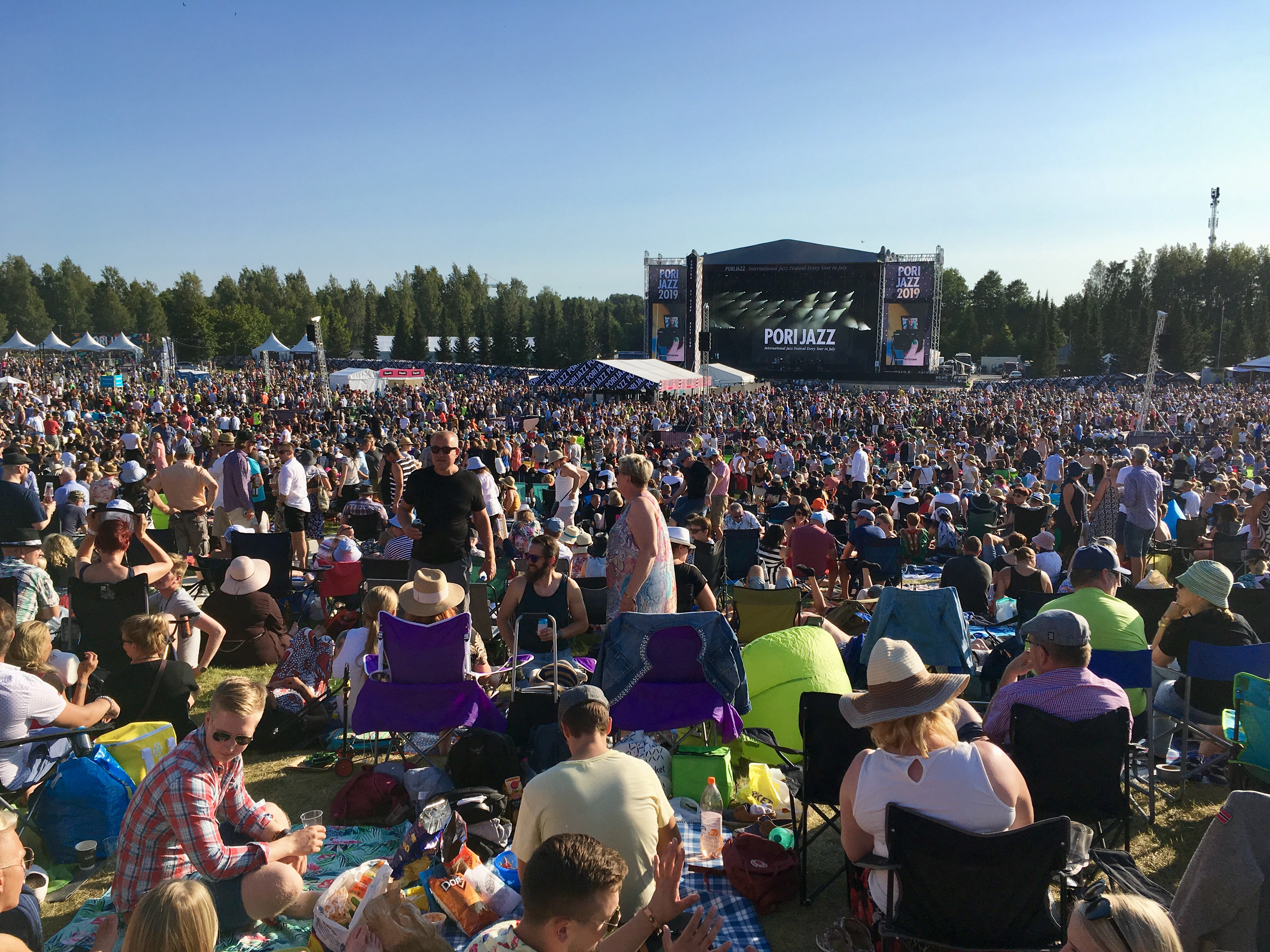
Pori Jazz in Pori, Satakunta in 2019.

- Pori Jazz
- Turku Jazz
