= Kirjurinluoto Arena =

Open-air concert park in Pori, Finland

Coordinates: 61.496205°N 21.781125°E

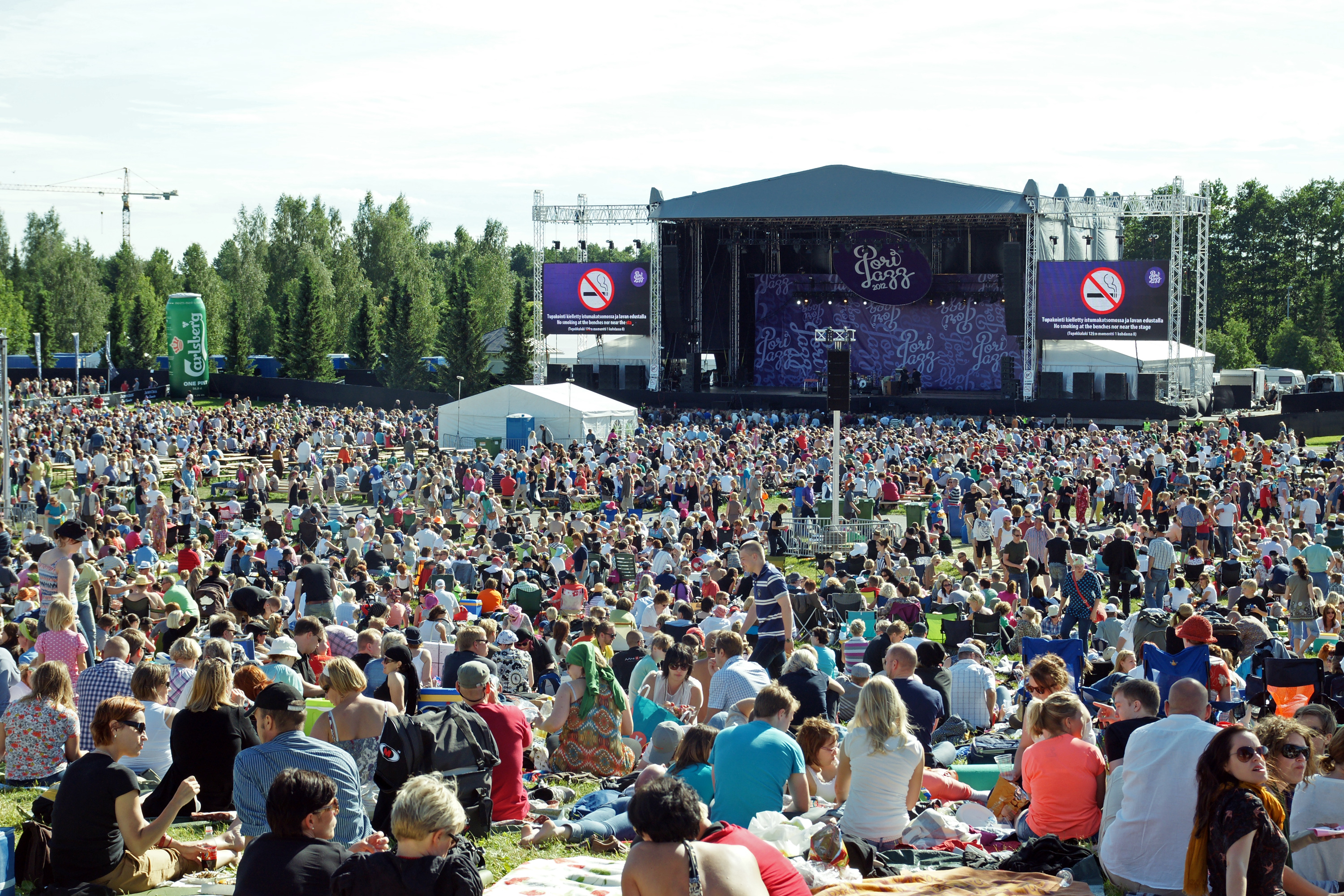
Pori Jazz 2012.

Kirjurinluoto Arena (also known as Pori Delta Arena) is an open-air concert park in the city of Pori, Finland. It is the only venue in Finland that is designed especially for open-air events. Size of the amphitheater-type arena is five hectares (12 acres). Concert park area includes also 22 hectares for camping and parking.

Kirjurinluoto Arena was built in 2001 and it is part of the Pori National Urban Park. The arena is located in Kirjurinluoto island, which lies in the delta of Kokemäenjoki-river. The island has been a park and a recreational area for the residents of Pori since the 19th century.

Main user of the Kirjurinluoto Arena is annual Pori Jazz festival. Arena has also hosted RMJ and Sonisphere music festivals as well as several fairs and religious events.

== Major events ==
2002

16 July; Paul Simon
18 July; Chaka Khan

2006

22 July; Sting

2008

16 July; Pori 450th anniversary concert
18 July; Santana

2009

25 July; Metallica

2010

8 August; Iron Maiden

2011

16 July; Elton John (Greatest Hits Tour)

2015

17 July; Jessie J (Sweet Talker Tour)

2019

19 July; Christina Aguilera (The X Tour)

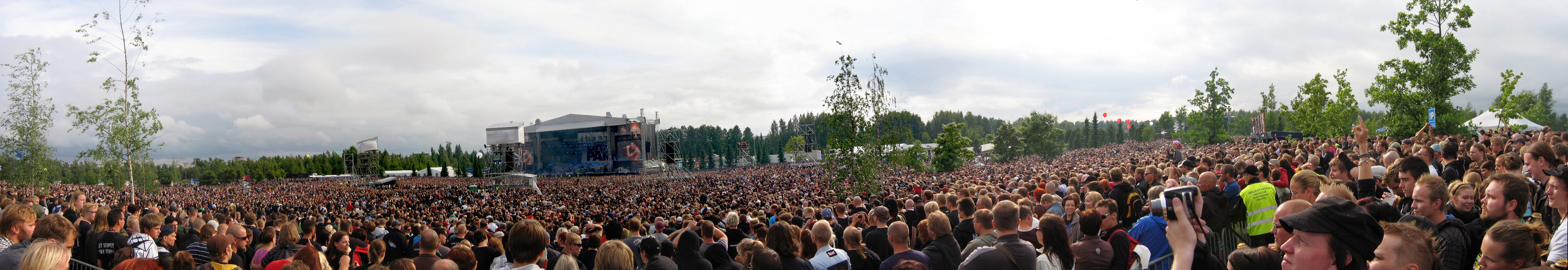
Sonisphere Festival at Kirjurinluoto Arena 2009.

== Sources ==
- City of Pori
- History of Pori Jazz
