= Sonisphere Festival =

Annual English touring music festival

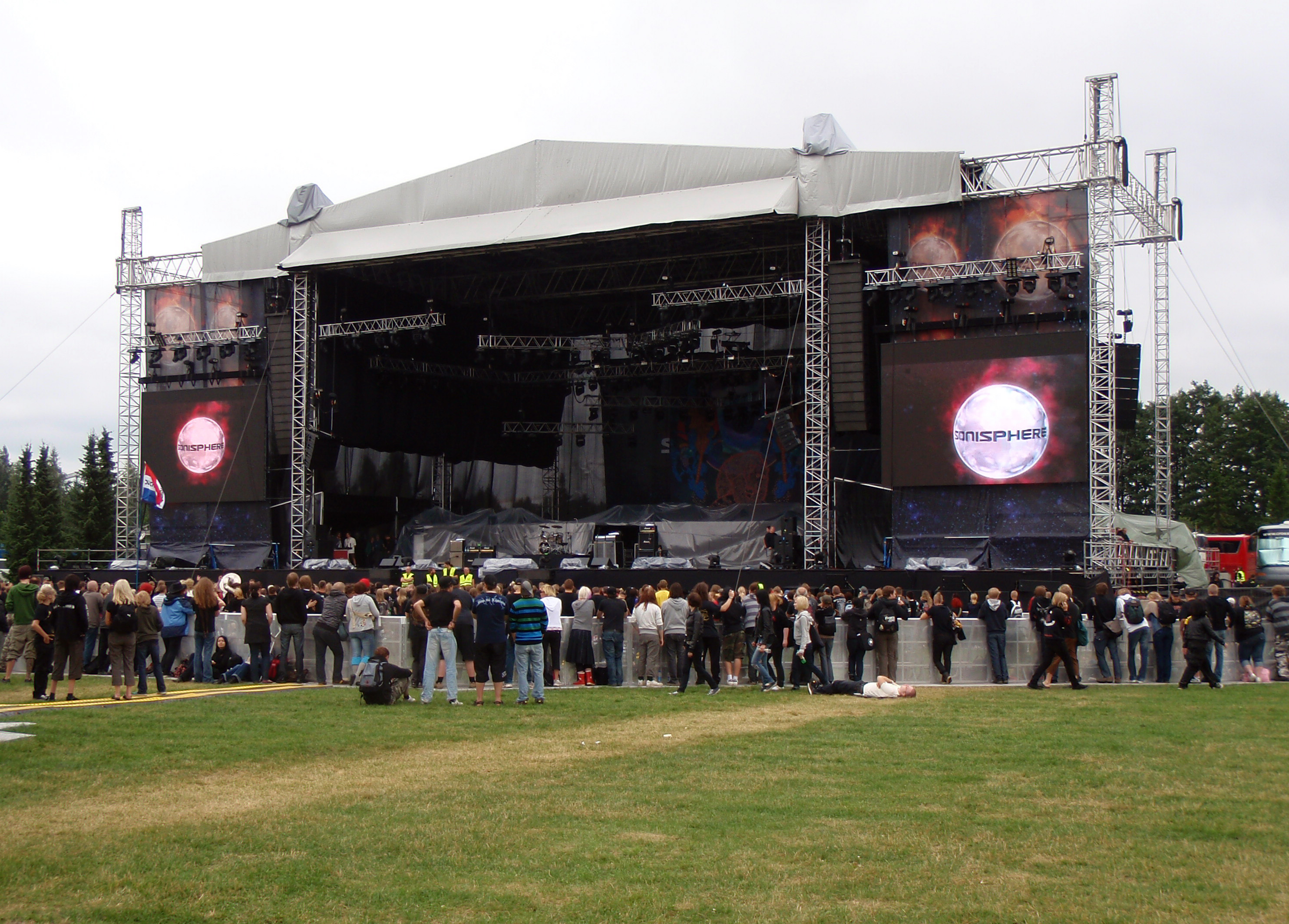
- Main Stage at Sonisphere Festival in Kirjurinluoto, Pori, Finland.
- Genre: Heavy metal; rock; punk rock; comedy
- Dates: June / July / August
- Location: Europe
- Years active: 2009–2016

The Sonisphere Festival was a touring rock music festival which took place across Europe between the months of June and August. The festival was owned by John Jackson and Kilimanjaro Live. It was jointly promoted by K2 and Kilimanjaro Live. It hosted heavy metal bands such as Iron Maiden, Metallica, Mötley Crüe, Slayer, Judas Priest, Megadeth, Avenged Sevenfold and Babymetal (the latter group would make their UK debut at the 2014 event).

The festival has not taken place in the UK since 2014. Stuart Galbraith, chief executive officer of Kilimanjaro Live, revealed in 2018 that Sonisphere will not return to the UK, due to financial issues.

== Event history ==
The idea for Sonisphere was first conceived by John Jackson in the late 90s. Jackson chose the name Sonisphere, from a combination of Sonic and Sphere. In 2008 Stuart Galbraith had formed business partnership with AEG Live called Kilimanjaro Live. John Jackson approached Stuart Galbraith with the idea of a pan-world touring festival that aligned with Kilimanjaro Live's plan for a UK festival. John Jackson is the Creator and Director of Sonisphere and Galbraith the Producer.

The first run of festivals ran throughout the summer of 2009 at six venues, returning in 2010 and 2011 with 11 venues.

Plans for future festivals consist of increasing the number of festivals, making the event global rather than local to Europe, expanding the UK event into a 3-day festival, and increasing the UK capacity from 40,000 to 60,000 attendees.

== Sonisphere 2009 ==
The 2009 Sonisphere festival tour was made up of six one-day festivals across Europe with a seventh festival in England spanning two days. The festival had a core group of bands that played each of the six dates with a number of extra bands added to each date individually. The locations for the 2009 festivals include Goffert Park, Nijmegen, Netherlands; Hockenheimring, Germany; The Forum, Barcelona, Spain; Folkets Park, Hultsfred, Sweden; Kirjurinluoto, Pori, Finland; and Knebworth House, Knebworth, England. Metallica were the main headliners for each of the 2009 Sonisphere Festivals.

=== Netherlands ===
The Dutch edition of the Sonisphere Festival took place on Saturday 20 June 2009 at Goffertpark in Nijmegen.

- Down
- Kamelot
- Korn
- Lamb of God
- Metallica
- Pendulum
- Slipknot
- Blaas Of Glory

Mastodon could not make it to Sonisphere due to scheduling issues. This was announced at Sonisphere itself, although some heard the news whilst traveling.

The Sword cancelled their show a few days before Sonisphere began.

=== Germany ===
The German edition of the Sonisphere Festival took place on Saturday 4 July 2009 at Hockenheimring with Metallica as headliners.

- Anthrax
- Die Toten Hosen
- Down
- In Extremo
- Lamb of God
- Mastodon
- Metallica
- The Prodigy

=== Spain ===
The Spanish edition of the Sonisphere Festival took place on Saturday 11 July 2009 at The Forum, Barcelona with headliners Metallica.

- Down
- Gojira
- Lamb of God
- Machine Head
- Mastodon
- Metallica
- Slipknot
- Soziedad Alkoholika
- The Eyes
- Blaas Of Glory

=== Sweden ===
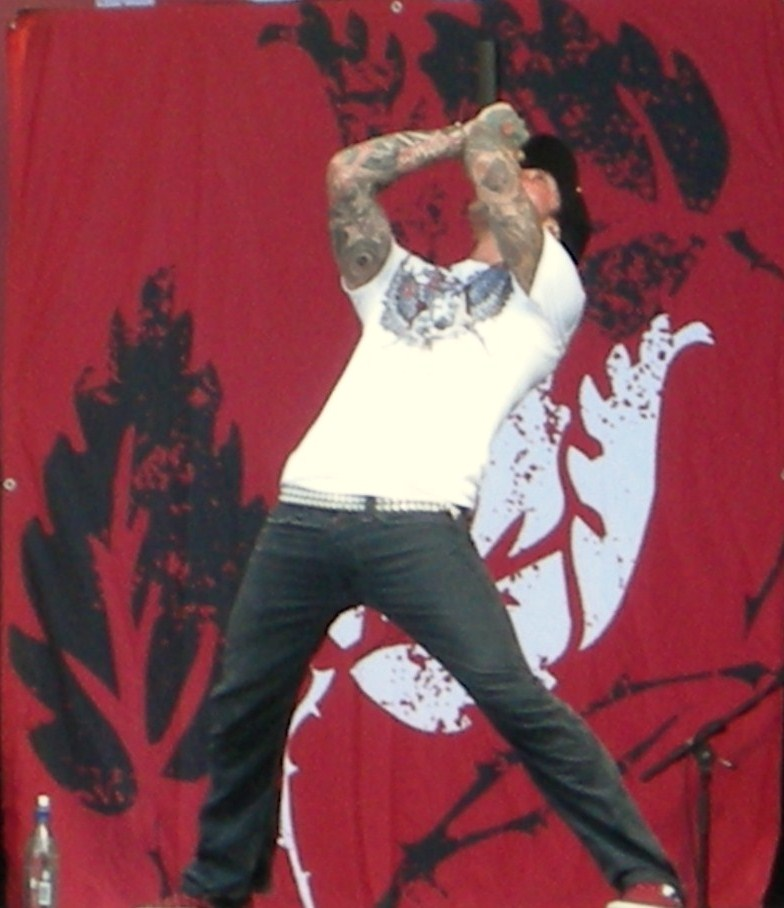
Jimmie Strimmell performing at Sonisphere Festival, Hultsfred, Sweden 2009

The Swedish edition of the Sonisphere Festival took place on Saturday 18 July 2009 at Folkets Park, Hultsfred with Metallica as headliners.

- Adept
- Conspiracy
- Cradle of Filth
- Dead by April
- Lamb of God
- Machine Head
- Mastodon
- Meshuggah
- Metallica
- Primal Scream
- The (International) Noise Conspiracy
- The Cult
- The Hives

=== Finland ===
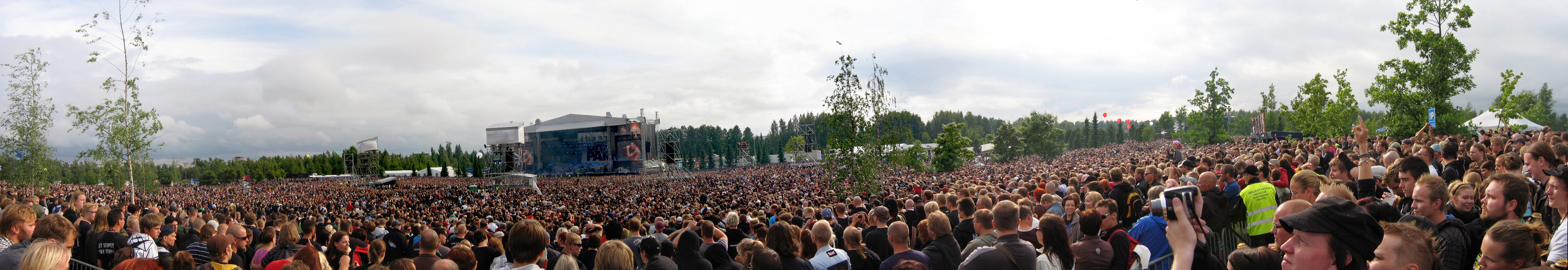
Linkin Park performing at Sonisphere Festival in Kirjurinluoto, Pori, Finland.

The Finnish edition of the Sonisphere Festival took place on Saturday 25 July 2009 at Kirjurinluoto Arena, Pori with Metallica as headliners.

- Diablo
- Lamb of God
- Linkin Park
- Los Bastardos Finlandeses
- Machine Head
- Mastodon
- Metallica
- Saxon
- Turisas
- Blaas Of Glory

Machine Head were forced to cut their set short, due to lead guitarist Phil Demmel collapsing on stage.

=== England ===
The British edition of the Sonisphere Festival took place over two days, on Saturday 1 and Sunday 2 August 2009, at Knebworth House, Knebworth with headliners Linkin Park (Saturday) and Metallica (Sunday). The festival featured four stages of music over the weekend, with the main two being staggered staging, the others being within the Bohemia village. The Bohemia stage (the third of four stages) was an undercover stage and was able to continue past the sound curfews placed upon the main stages. This was The Rev's final live performance as Avenged Sevenfold's drummer before his death in December 2009. It was also the last European appearance of Ronnie James Dio before he died of stomach cancer in May 2010.

- Avenged Sevenfold played their final concert with The Rev before his passing on 28 December 2009. The band's final song together was Almost Easy.
- Dead by Sunrise appeared on the Apollo Stage on the Saturday night as part of Linkin Park's encore.
- Coheed and Cambria were late arriving, due to them missing their ferry and as such were moved onto the Bohemia stage to play a later slot originally intended for the band FACT. As such, FACT played the Apollo stage.
- Lamb of God's guitarist Mark Morton missed the band's slot on 2 August as his wife was due to give birth around that time. Unearth's Buz McGrath filled in for him for the band's show at Sonisphere UK.
- Nine Inch Nails performance was said to be their last in Europe as they were set to stop touring at the end of that tour after 20 years. Ultimately the resumed touring, returning to the UK in 2013 at Reading and Leeds festivals and playing several dates in the UK in May 2014.
- Thunder played their last set as well after 20 years of performing.
- Anthrax played what was billed as a one-off show with former vocalist John Bush as the originally intended vocalist, Dan Nelson, was no longer part of the band.
- Machine Head pulled out when Limp Bizkit's addition bumped them down the bill; however, they did return to play the fourth slot on the Apollo stage as Special Guests.
- Frank Turner pulled out for undisclosed reasons, though he has claimed to fans that he was forced to choose between this festival and Leeds and Reading festivals, ultimately choosing the latter.
- Fear Factory cancelled tour dates for what they claimed to be recording of a new album, but was ultimately found out to be legal disputes over the use of the name Fear Factory.
- Thin Lizzy pulled out as the band parted ways with guitarist-vocalist John Sykes.
- Dirty Little Rabbits pulled out before the festival due to their drummer suffering from exhaustion after months of touring with Slipknot.
- The Ataris pulled out after one of their members contracted swine flu.

== Sonisphere 2010 ==
The Sonisphere 2010 tour visited eleven locations around Europe between 16 June and 8 August 2010. The locations for Sonisphere 2010 were Poland, Switzerland, Czech Republic, Bulgaria, Greece, Romania, Turkey, Spain, United Kingdom, Sweden and Finland. Unlike in 2009, there was not a core group of headliners performing all dates. The headliners for 2010 were Iron Maiden, Metallica and Rammstein.

=== Poland ===
Warsaw, Poland was the host city for the first of the 2010 festivals; that was first announced on 9 December 2009. The 2010 Sonisphere in Poland took place on 16 June 2010. Metallica, Megadeth, Slayer and Anthrax, bands which make up the big four of thrash metal, played together for the first time.

- Anthrax
- Behemoth
- Frontside
- Megadeth
- Metallica
- Slayer

=== Switzerland ===
Switzerland was the second nation to host the Sonisphere festival in 2010 with the event taking place at Degenaupark in Jonschwil on 18 June 2010.

- 3 Inches of Blood
- Airbourne
- Alice in Chains
- Amon Amarth
- Anthrax
- As I Lay Dying
- Atreyu
- Blaas Of Glory
- Bullet for My Valentine
- Dear Superstar
- DevilDriver
- Hellyeah
- Mastodon
- Megadeth
- Metallica
- Motörhead
- Overkill
- Rise Against
- Slayer
- Smoke Blow
- Stone Sour
- Volbeat

=== Czech Republic ===
Czech Republic hosted the festival in Milovice on 19 June 2010; this was also a one-day festival. Metallica headlined this event.

- Alice in Chains
- Anthrax
- DevilDriver
- Fear Factory
- Megadeth
- Metallica
- Panic Cell
- Rise Against
- Slayer
- Stone Sour
- Therapy?
- Volbeat

=== Bulgaria ===
Bulgaria held its first Sonisphere over two days in Sofia on 22 and 23 June 2010. The venue was the Vasil Levski National Stadium.

Day 1 – Tuesday 22 June

- Anthrax
- Megadeth
- Metallica
- Slayer

Day 2 – Wednesday 23 June

- Alice in Chains
- Manowar
- Rammstein
- Stone Sour

This concert was also broadcast live around the world in movie theaters as part of the Big Four Tour. This was the first time in their history that all four bands played together on one stage, performing the Diamond Head song "Am I Evil?".

=== Greece ===
The Sonisphere festival in Greece was held on 24 June 2010 at Terra Vibe Park in Athens in front of 30,000 people.

- Anthrax
- Bullet for My Valentine
- Megadeth
- Metallica
- Slayer
- Stone Sour
- Suicidal Angels

=== Romania ===
Romania held the Sonisphere festival from 25 to 27 June 2010 in Bucharest at Romexpo.

Day 1 – Friday 25 June

- Accept
- Manowar
- Orphaned Land
- Paradise Lost
- Volbeat

Day 2 – Saturday 26 June

- Anthrax
- Megadeth
- Metallica
- Slayer
- Vița de Vie

Day 3 – Sunday 27 June

- Alice in Chains
- Anathema
- Rammstein
- Stone Sour

=== Turkey ===
Turkey held the Sonisphere festival at the same time as Romania: 25 to 27 June 2010. This part of Sonisphere was at the BJK İnönü Stadium in Istanbul. Akbank sponsored the event.

Day 1 – Friday 25 June

- Alice in Chains
- Black Tooth
- Pentagram
- Rammstein
- Stone Sour

Day 2 – Saturday 26 June

- Accept
- Hayko Cepkin
- Manowar
- Volbeat

Day 3 – Sunday 27 June

- Anthrax
- Megadeth
- Metallica
- Slayer

The bands on 27 June were on the stage one after another, but did not play altogether.

This was the first time Rammstein and Anthrax came to Turkey.

The bass player of Manowar, Joey DeMaio, made a speech to the audience in Turkish.

=== Spain ===
Spain hosted Sonisphere on 9 and 10 July 2010, at Getafe Open Air in Madrid.

Day 1 – Friday 9 July

- Anathema
- Bullet for My Valentine
- Faith No More
- Porcupine Tree
- Saxon
- Slayer
- Suicidal Tendencies
- Volbeat
- W.A.S.P.

Day 2 – Saturday 10 July

- Alice in Chains
- Annihilator
- Coheed and Cambria
- Deftones
- Megadeth
- Meshuggah
- Rammstein
- Soulfly

=== United Kingdom ===
Sonisphere arrived in the UK for a three-day festival, taking place at Knebworth House between Friday 30 July – Sunday 1 August. Music included a Rocky Horror Show theme with Alice Cooper, and headliners Iron Maiden and Rammstein.

Day 1 – Friday 30 July

- 65daysofstatic
- Alice Cooper
- And So I Watch You from Afar
- Bigelf
- Blaas Of Glory
- Black Spiders
- Chrome Hoof
- Deaf Havana
- Delain
- Europe
- Fei Comodo
- Gary Numan
- Hawk Eyes
- Karma to Burn
- Lower Than Atlantis
- Sylosis
- Terrorvision
- Throats
- Turisas
- Winnebago Deal

Day 2 – Saturday 31 July

- Anthrax
- Apocalyptica
- Audrey Horne
- Blaas Of Glory
- Corey Taylor
- earthtone9
- Enforcer
- Evile
- Family Force 5
- Fear Factory
- Feeder
- Gallows
- Good Charlotte
- Heaven's Basement
- InMe
- Katatonia
- Lacuna Coil
- Little Fish
- Mötley Crüe
- Outasight
- Papa Roach
- Placebo
- Polar Bear Club
- RSJ
- Rammstein
- Sabaton
- Sick of It All
- Skunk Anansie
- Soulfly
- Therapy?
- Turbowolf
- Young Legionnaire

Day 3 – Sunday 1 August

- Alice in Chains
- Army of Freshmen
- Blaas Of Glory
- Bring Me the Horizon
- CKY
- Dir En Grey
- Fightstar
- Funeral for a Friend
- Henry Rollins
- Iggy and the Stooges
- Iron Maiden
- Karnivool
- Kylesa
- Love Amongst Ruin
- Madina Lake
- Pendulum
- Rise to Remain
- Sacred Mother Tongue
- Skindred
- Slaves to Gravity
- Slayer
- Sweet Savage
- The Cult
- The Defiled
- The Eighties Matchbox B-Line Disaster
- The Union
- The Xcerts

==== Band dropouts ====
- Outcry Collective pulled out due to the band breaking up.
- Municipal Waste pulled out due to exhaustion and injury.

=== Sweden ===
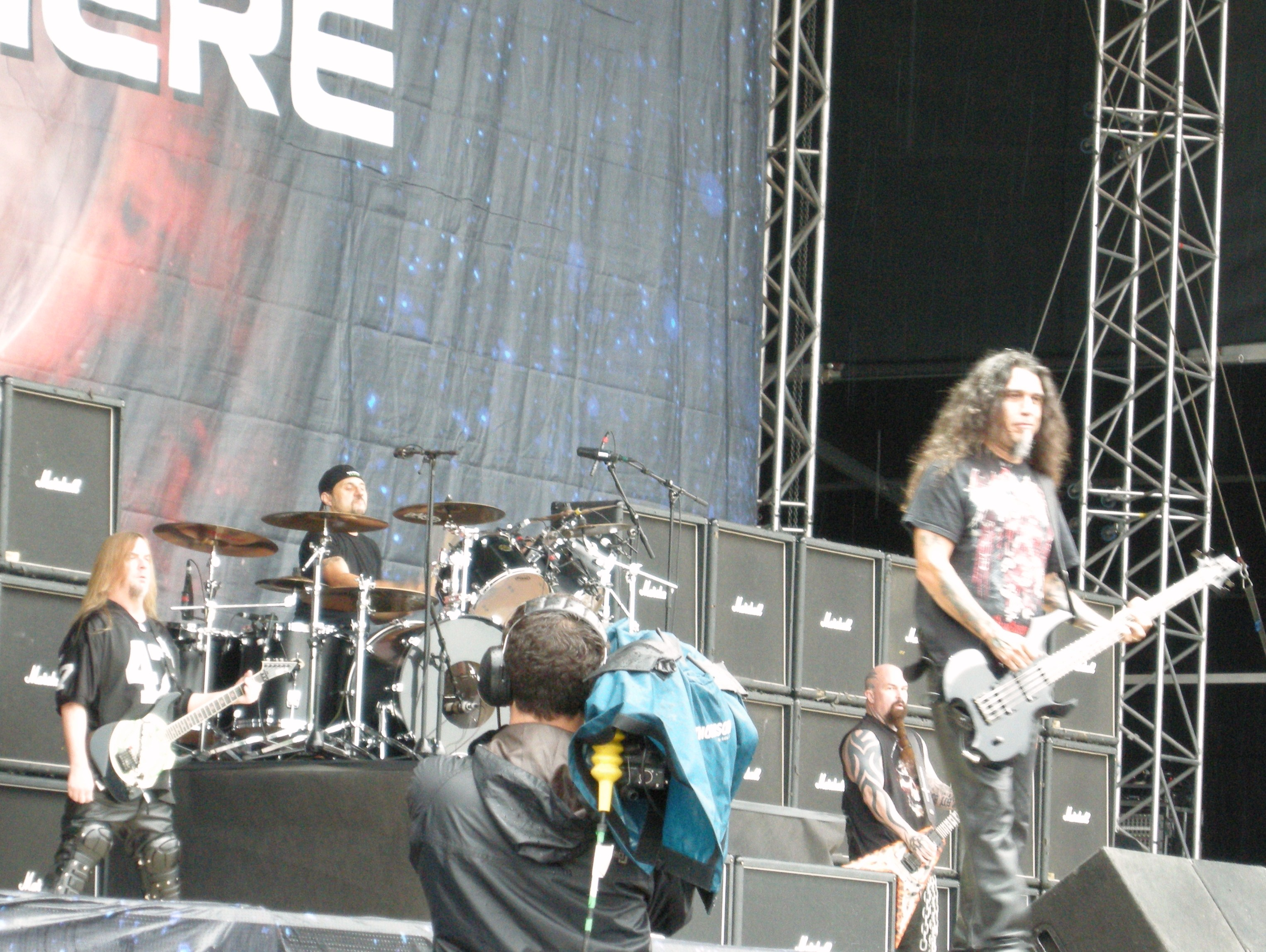
Slayer performing at Sonisphere Festival, Stockholm, Sweden 2010.

Sweden hosted Sonisphere in Stockholm on 7 August 2010 for a one-day festival. Iron Maiden announced via their official website that the band would headline the Swedish event. The following bands performed at the event. Heaven & Hell cancelled due to Ronnie James Dio's illness and later death.

- Alice Cooper
- Anthrax
- HammerFall
- Iggy and the Stooges
- Imperial State Electric
- Iron Maiden
- Mötley Crüe
- Slayer
- Warrior Soul

=== Finland ===
Sonisphere finished its tour in Finland, where tickets sold out in 2009. It was held on 7 and 8 August 2010, at Kirjurinluoto Arena Pori. Iron Maiden and HIM headlined the event.

A freak storm hit Sonisphere in Finland on Sunday 8 August 2010, causing severe damage to the second stage, rendering the stage unsafe and unusable. Two people were seriously injured and one died in hospital. The Heaven & Hell show was cancelled before the beginning of the festival due to Ronnie James Dio's health issues. He died on 16 May 2010.

Day 1 – Saturday 7 August

- Alice in Chains
- Apocalyptica
- HIM
- Serj Tankian
- Stam1na
- The 69 Eyes
- The Cult
- Volbeat

Day 2 – Sunday 8 August

- Alice Cooper
- Anthrax
- Iggy and the Stooges
- Insomnium
- Iron Maiden
- Mokoma
- Profane Omen
- Slayer

== Sonisphere 2011 ==
Sonisphere returned in 2011 with new venues in India, France and Italy but did not return to Romania. It also marked the first time that Metallica played in India. The first headliner announced for Knebworth, England was Slipknot.

=== UK ===
Sonisphere Knebworth took place from 8 to 10 July 2011. On 3 December 2010, it was announced that the American band Slipknot would headline Sonisphere 2011. Soon afterward, on 6 December it was announced that Scottish rock band Biffy Clyro would be headlining the Saturday night, in the band's first major festival headlining performance. On 13 December 2010, it was announced that Metallica, Megadeth, Slayer and Anthrax would headline the Friday of the Knebworth event. This will be the first time that The Big Four perform together in the UK. On 17 January 2011, it was announced that Motörhead, Mastodon, In Flames and Parkway Drive will be playing the UK leg of Sonisphere. On 31 January 2011, it was announced that Weezer, Airbourne, Architects and Diamond Head will be playing Sonisphere. On 28 February You Me at Six, All Time Low, Sum 41, House of Pain, Arch Enemy, Grinspoon, Fozzy and Periphery were added to the lineup. On 28 March Bill Bailey, Jarred Christmas, Jason John Whitehead, Jim Breuer, and Steve-O were added to the lineup. According to the official site, during all three days of event, nearly 190,000 people were present. Cancer Bats performed a Black Sabbath tribute show. Motörhead dedicated their set to their former guitarist Würzel who died just the day before. The Saturday 9 July show opened at 11:30AM with a performance by Richard Cheese & Lounge Against The Machine.

=== Sweden ===
Sonisphere in Sweden returned to Stockholm, but it was held at "Globen Open Air" on Saturday 9 July 2011. Slipknot headlined the event, with In Flames, Mastodon, Mustasch and Dead by April also playing at the festival. Only 16,000 fans came to see the bands this time.

- Airbourne
- Arch Enemy
- Dead by April
- Graveyard
- In Flames
- Kvelertak
- Mastodon
- Mustasch
- Seventribe
- Slipknot

=== Finland ===
Sonisphere in Finland took place at Kalasatama, Helsinki on 2 July 2011. Slipknot headlined the bill with the other bands performing included: In Flames, Opeth, Sonata Arctica, HammerFall, Mastodon and more. As opposed to the previous two years, the 2011 Sonisphere was less well attended, with attendance of only 12,000 fans.

- Battle Beast
- HammerFall
- In Flames
- Mastodon
- Norther
- Opeth
- Poisonblack
- Slipknot
- Sonata Arctica
- Stam1na

=== Poland ===
Sonisphere Poland returned to Bemowo Airport, Warsaw on Friday 10 June 2011. Iron Maiden announced on their website that they would headline the event in Poland in 2011. Motörhead was confirmed as the second headliner of the festival. Other bands announced were Mastodon, Volbeat, Killing Joke, Devin Townsend, Hunter and Made of Hate. Iron Maiden played to the crowd of over 40,000 people who attended the event.

- Corruption
- Devin Townsend Project
- Hunter
- Iron Maiden
- Killing Joke
- Made of Hate
- Mastodon
- Motörhead
- Volbeat

=== Greece ===
Sonisphere in Greece returned to Athens and it took place in Terra Vibe Park, Malakassa on Friday 17 June 2011. Iron Maiden headlined the event, and Slipknot were special guests, playing live for the first time since Paul Gray's death. Mastodon, Gojira and Virus were the supporting acts. On 6 May it was announced that Nightfall, Moonspell, Need and Total Riot would play on 17 June 2011. Rotting Christ were the headliners of the second stage of the Greek leg of Sonisphere Festival. More than 25,000 fans attended the event.

=== Italy ===
Sonisphere 2011 took place on Italian soil for the first time. More than 40,000 people were present during two days of festival. The two-day event was booked at the Autodromo Enzo e Dino Ferrari in Imola, on 25 and 26 June 2011. Iron Maiden were the headliners on the first evening, and the band performed to nearly 30,000 fans. Next day's headliners were Linkin Park with 13,000 in attendance. The other bands on the bill were: Slipknot, My Chemical Romance, Sum 41, Alter Bridge, The Cult, Mastodon, Motörhead, Guano Apes, Funeral for a Friend, Papa Roach, Rob Zombie, Apocalyptica and others.

=== France ===
Slipknot and The Big Four confirmed that they would be headlining the French Sonisphere event, which took place on 8 and 9 July 2011. Other bands announced were Dream Theater, Airbourne, Mastodon, Gojira, Loudblast, Tarja, Volbeat, Diamond Head, Mass Hysteria, Rise To Remain, Symfonia, Bring Me the Horizon and Papa Roach. The two nights attracted 76,000 people. Metallica performed Helpless from Diamond Head, with Diamond Head and Anthrax members on stage, but without Slayer and Megadeth

=== India ===
On 1 May 2011, Metallica confirmed on their official website that they would headline the Indian edition of Sonisphere, which took place in Bangalore on 30 October at the Palace Grounds.

=== Spain ===
The third Spanish Sonisphere Festival took place on 15 and 16 July 2011, at Getafe Open Air in Madrid. The main headliner was Iron Maiden with The Darkness and Slash headlining the night before. Sonsphere Spain included around 70,000 attendees. Iron Maiden played to a full house venue with nearly 45,000 fans.

=== Turkey ===
Iron Maiden headlined the second Turkish Sonisphere show, which took place on 19 June 2011, at Maçka Küçükçiftlik Park, Istanbul. Other bands that played included Slipknot, Alice Cooper, Mastodon and In Flames. Tickets were sold to approximately 25,000 people.

=== Bulgaria ===
A Sonisphere event was scheduled to happen this year in Bulgaria but according to local promoter Marcel Avram and Balkan Entertainment the event was cancelled due to logistical and other problems that could not be rectified. The promoters also said that these problems were out of their control and that full refunds for tickets would begin on 15 June and continue to 15 July.

=== Switzerland ===
Sonisphere returned to Switzerland for the second time. The event took place at St. Jakob on 23 and 24 June in Basel. Over two evenings more than 35,000 people attended the headlining shows. 23 June headliner was Judas Priest with the Epitaph World Tour at the St. Jakobshalle; the next evening's headliner was Iron Maiden, who performed to almost 25,000 fans gathered at Leichtathletik Stadion. The other bands were: Whitesnake, Alice Cooper, Slipknot, Limp Bizkit, In Extremo, In Flames, Papa Roach, Kreator, Mr. Big, Hatebreed, HammerFall, Alter Bridge, Gojira, Gwar, Skindred and more.

=== Czech Republic ===
For the second time, Sonisphere took place in Czech Republic. The 2011 event was originally scheduled for Milovice Airport, but after a few months was changed to Praha's Výstaviště Park. Nearly 30,000 people from Czech Republic and multiple other countries (Poland, Germany, Austria) attended the headlining gig of Iron Maiden on 11 June 2011. Other bands on the bill included The Sisters of Mercy, Kreator, Korn, Mastodon, Cavalera Conspiracy and others.

== Sonisphere 2012 ==
=== UK ===
Sonisphere Knebworth was scheduled to take place from 6 to 8 July 2012. On 20 February 2012, the headliners were announced as Kiss (Friday), Queen + Adam Lambert (Saturday) and Faith No More (Sunday). Several bands were set to play an album in its entirety, including Mastodon performing The Hunter, Glassjaw performing Worship and Tribute and Hundred Reasons performing Ideas Above Our Station. On 29 March the festival was cancelled with the organisers stating that co-ordinating the festival to an appropriate standard this year had proved more difficult than expected.

=== Poland ===
Poland hosted Sonisphere on 10 May 2012, at Bemowo Airport.

- Acid Drinkers
- Black Label Society
- Gojira
- Hunter
- Luxtorpeda
- Machine Head
- Metallica

=== Spain ===
Spain hosted Sonisphere on 25 and 26 May 2012, at Getafe Open Air.

Day 1 – Friday 25 May

- Corrosion of Conformity
- Kobra and the Lotus
- Kyuss Lives!
- Limp Bizkit
- Machine Head
- Orange Goblin
- Paradise Lost
- Rise to Remain
- Skindred
- Sonata Arctica
- Soundgarden
- The Offspring

Day 2 – Saturday 26 May

- Children of Bodom
- Clutch
- Enter Shikari
- Evanescence
- Fear Factory
- Ghost
- Gojira
- Mastodon
- Metallica
- Sister
- Slayer
- Vita Imana
- Within Temptation

=== Switzerland ===
Switzerland held Sonisphere on 30 May 2012, at Yverdon-les-Bains.

- Eluveitie
- Gojira
- Mastodon
- Metallica
- Motörhead
- Slayer

=== Finland ===
Finland held Sonisphere on 4 June 2012, at Kalasatama.

- Amorphis
- Ghost
- Gojira
- Hardcore Superstar
- Machine Head
- Metallica

=== France ===
France held Sonisphere on 7 and 8 July 2012, at Amneville.

== Sonisphere 2013 ==
=== UK ===
In December 2012, organisers announced the festival would make a return after cancelling that year's edition in Knebworth. However, on 21 December it was confirmed the event would be cancelled for the second year in succession, citing a struggle to secure a strong lineup for the festival.

== Sonisphere 2014 ==
=== UK ===
It was announced on 12 November 2013, that Sonisphere would return to Knebworth, UK, from 4 to 6 July 2014. The festival would celebrate 40 years of Rock Music at Knebworth Park. Sonisphere would come to Hamburg, Germany on 4 June 2014.

On 2 December Iron Maiden (Saturday) and Metallica (Sunday) were announced as the first two headliners of the UK edition of Sonisphere. This would be Iron Maiden's final show of their highly successful Maiden England World Tour. It was also revealed when Metallica were announced, that fans booking weekend tickets would be eligible to vote for 17 of the 18 songs in Metallica's setlist (The 18th to be one of their new songs). On 11 December The Prodigy were announced to be headlining the Friday slot. On 6 January, Slayer, Mastodon, Alice in Chains, Ghost, Karnivool, Gojira and Airbourne were added to the lineup as undercard bookings. Then on 21 January, Limp Bizkit were revealed to be the special guests for The Prodigy on the Friday, with Dropkick Murphys, The Sisters of Mercy, Anthrax, Chas & Dave, The Devin Townsend Project, Carniflex, Silverstein, The Virgin Marys, Voodoo Six, TessaracT and Alestorm, among other bands, also appearing across the weekend.

For the first time at a UK festival, the pro wrestling company Progress Wrestling held three shows at The Satellite Stage on all three days. The shows were well received and considered on multiple music sites "Best at Sonisphere 2014", especially after a "Lego Deathmatch" was held on the final night.

Sonisphere also later revealed on their official Facebook page, that they plan to continue their tradition of having no stage clashes between the two main stages (Apollo & Saturn stages), but the other stages would run as normal.

The capacity of the 2014 UK festival was 60,000.

==== Babymetal's debut ====
The 2014 Sonisphere event would also feature one of the most anticipated sets in the festival's history, the United Kingdom debut of then-unknown Japanese death metal trio Babymetal. The original plan was for the group to have a late evening set on Sunday in the Bohemia tent; however, after Babymetal's music video for their song "Gimme Chocolate!!" was released and went viral, the event planners decided to move their set to early Saturday morning on the main Apollo stage.

== Sonisphere 2015 ==
=== Italy ===
Italy held Sonisphere on 2 June 2015, at Assago Summer Arena.

- Faith No More
- Gojira
- Hawk Eyes
- Meshuggah
- Metallica
- Three Days Grace
- We Are Harlot

=== Switzerland ===
Switzerland held Sonisphere on 6 June 2015, at ExpoPark Nidau-Biel.

- Bonaparte
- Incubus
- Muse
- The Hives

=== UK ===
Sonisphere UK 2015 was cancelled in January 2015 after the organisers stated they couldn't get a line-up together they deemed suitable for the event.

== Sonisphere 2016 ==
=== Switzerland ===
Switzerland held Sonisphere on 3 and 4 June 2016, at Allmend in Lucerne.

Day 1 – Friday 3 June

- Gojira
- Iron Maiden
- Sabaton
- The Raven Age
- The Wild Lies
- Tremonti

Day 2 – Saturday 4 June

- Anthrax
- Apocalyptica
- Powerwolf
- Rammstein
- Shakra
- Slayer
- The Shrine
- tuXedoo

== See also ==
- Concerts at Knebworth House
- The Final Frontier World Tour
- World Magnetic Tour
- Memorial World Tour
