= Kirjurinluoto =

Island and park in Pori, Finland

Coordinates: 61°29′34″N 021°47′6″E

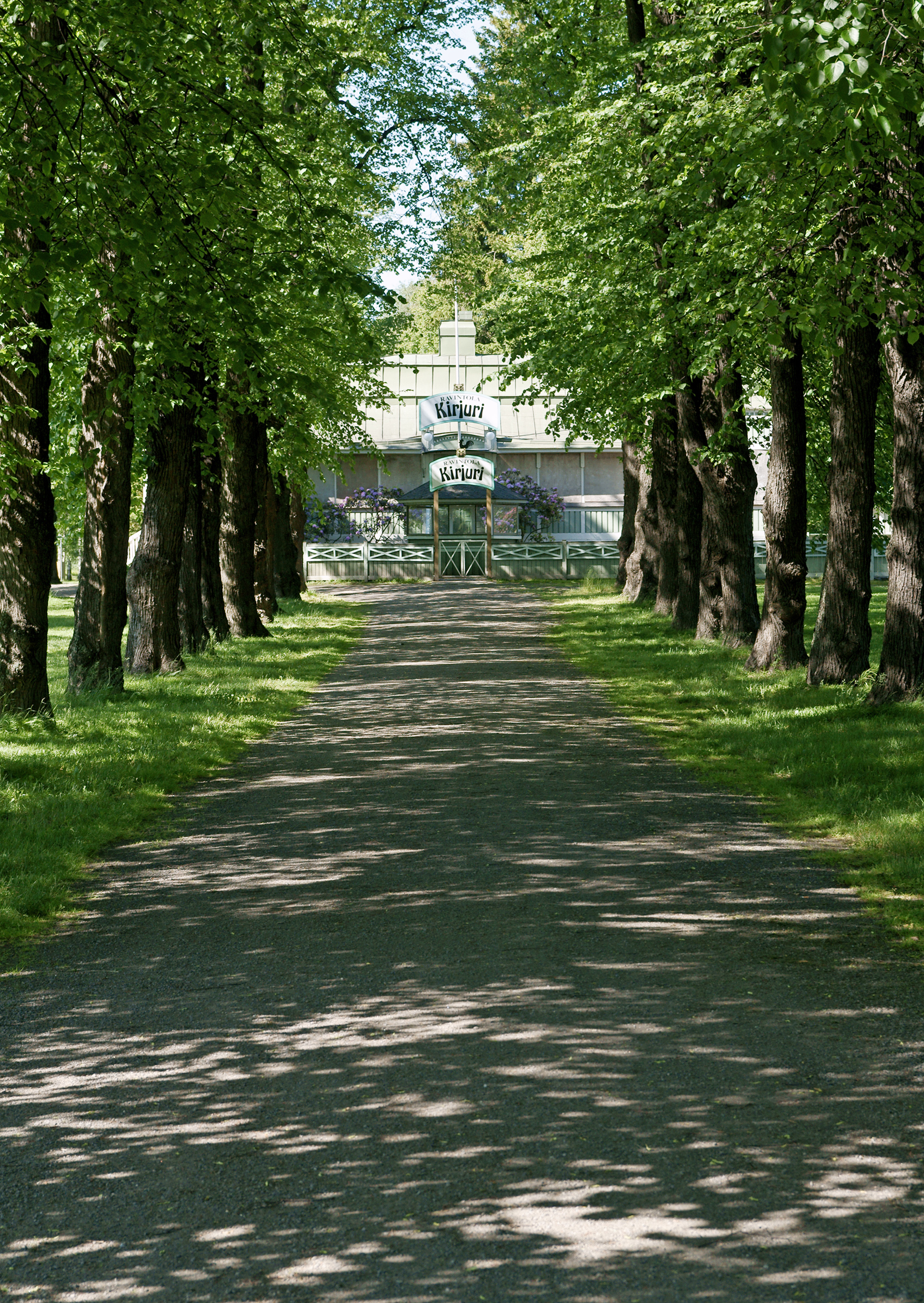
A restaurant at the Kirjurinluoto Park

Kirjurinluoto (Swedish: Skrivarsholmen) is an island and a park in the delta of Kokemäenjoki river in the city of Pori in Finland. It is best known for the Kirjurinluoto Arena, an open-air concert park which hosts the annual Pori Jazz festival.

Kirjurinluoto is a great part of the Pori National Urban Park. At the Kirjurinluoto island are located several facilities like cafés and restaurants, a playground for children, a beach, a miniature golf, a disc golf course and a summer theater.

== History ==
In the latter half of the 19th century Kirjurinluoto island was a recreational area for the wealthy citizens of Pori. The English landscape garden was completed in 1897 by the design of Swedish garden designer Anders Fredrik Rydberg and the Art Nouveau style restaurant in 1910. It was drawn by Finnish architect Torkel Nordman. The first stage for musical events and theater plays was built in 1921. The park was later renovated in the 1930s and 1960s. The first bridge to Kirjurinluoto was opened in 1973, a smaller bridge for pedestrians and cyclists in 2001. A temporary bridge for pedestrian use is opened every summer. A new summer theater has been active in Kirjurinluoto since 2008.

In the early 1980s the City of Pori held an architecture competition for the design of a congress hall planned in Kirjurinluoto. The competition was won by a Danish architecture firm Kjær & Richter but the construction was never launched.

== Concert park ==
Since 1966 Kirjurinluoto has been the main venue for Pori Jazz Festival which is one of the largest jazz festivals in Europe. A permanent stage, "Lokki" ("The Seagull"), was completed in 1974. Kirjurinluoto Arena is an open-air concert park for audience up to 80,000. It has been the venue for Pori Jazz Festival since 2004 and for Sonisphere Festival in 2009 and 2010, as well as for some individual happenings. Today the old Lokki-stage hosts smaller events, such as Porispere rock festival.

Over the decades, Kirjurinluoto has been a venue for dozens of international major artists, such as Metallica, Kylie Minogue, Iron Maiden, Elton John, Kanye West, Phil Collins, Carlos Santana and Sting.

== Gallery ==
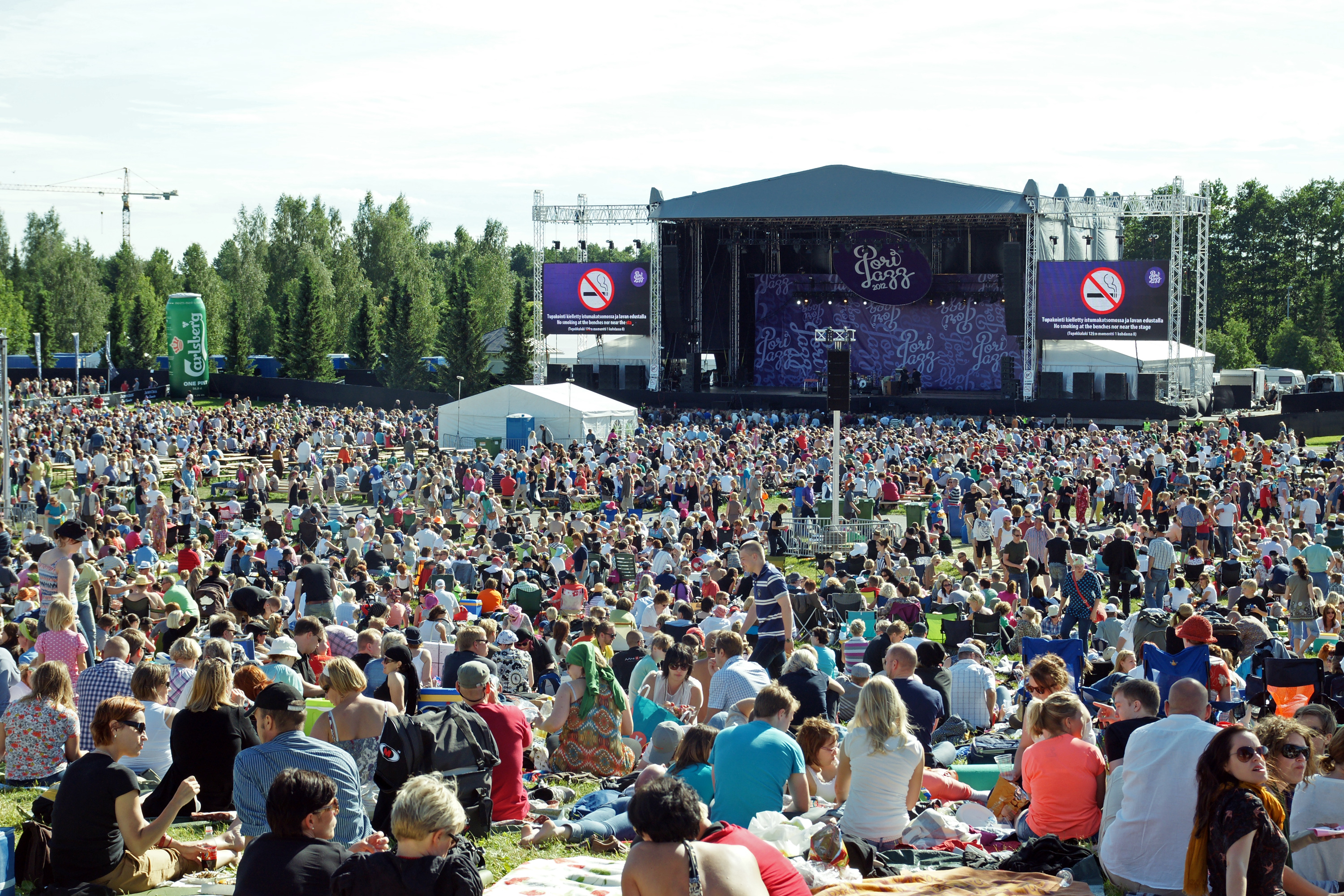
Pori Jazz 2012

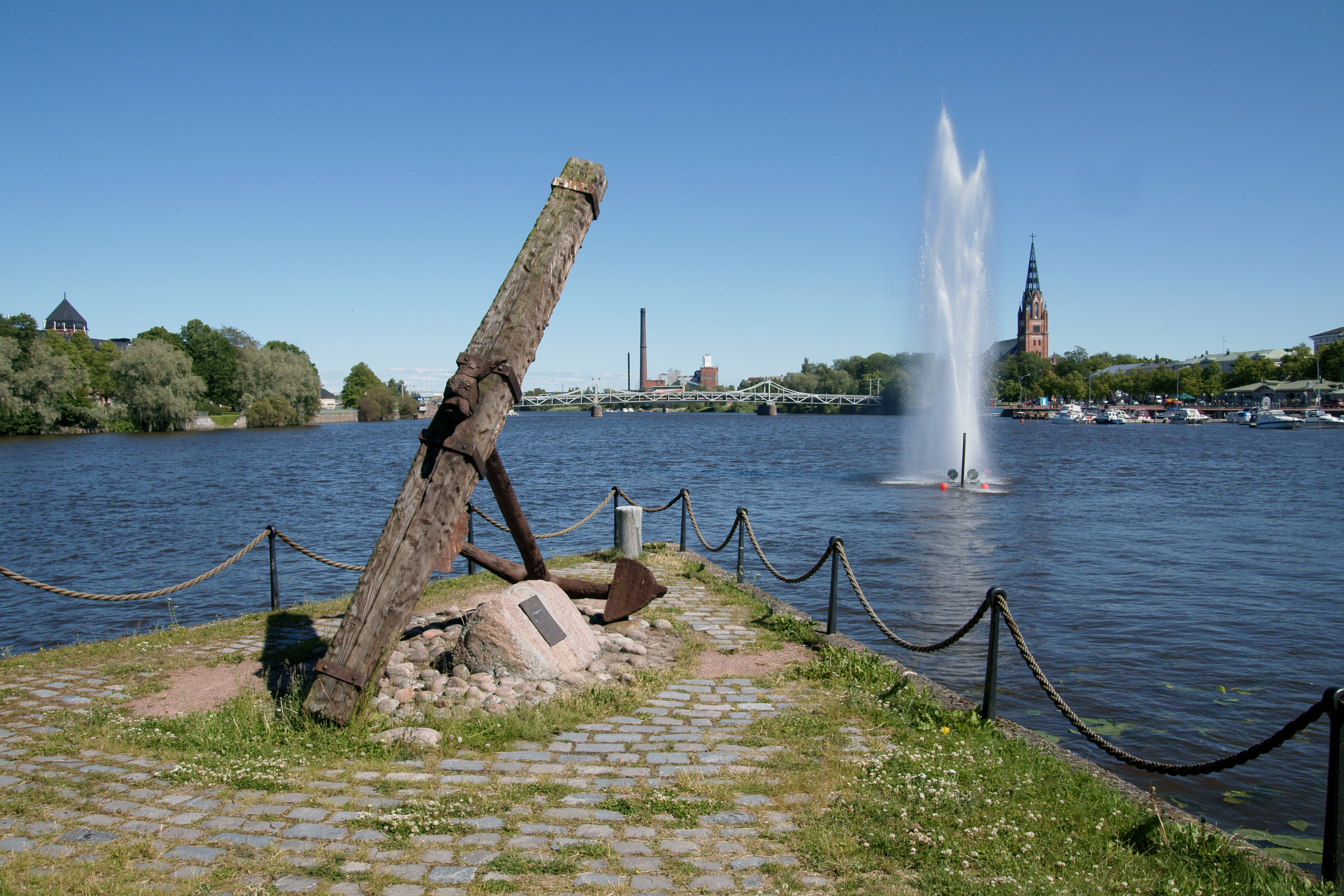
The tip of Kirjurinluoto island

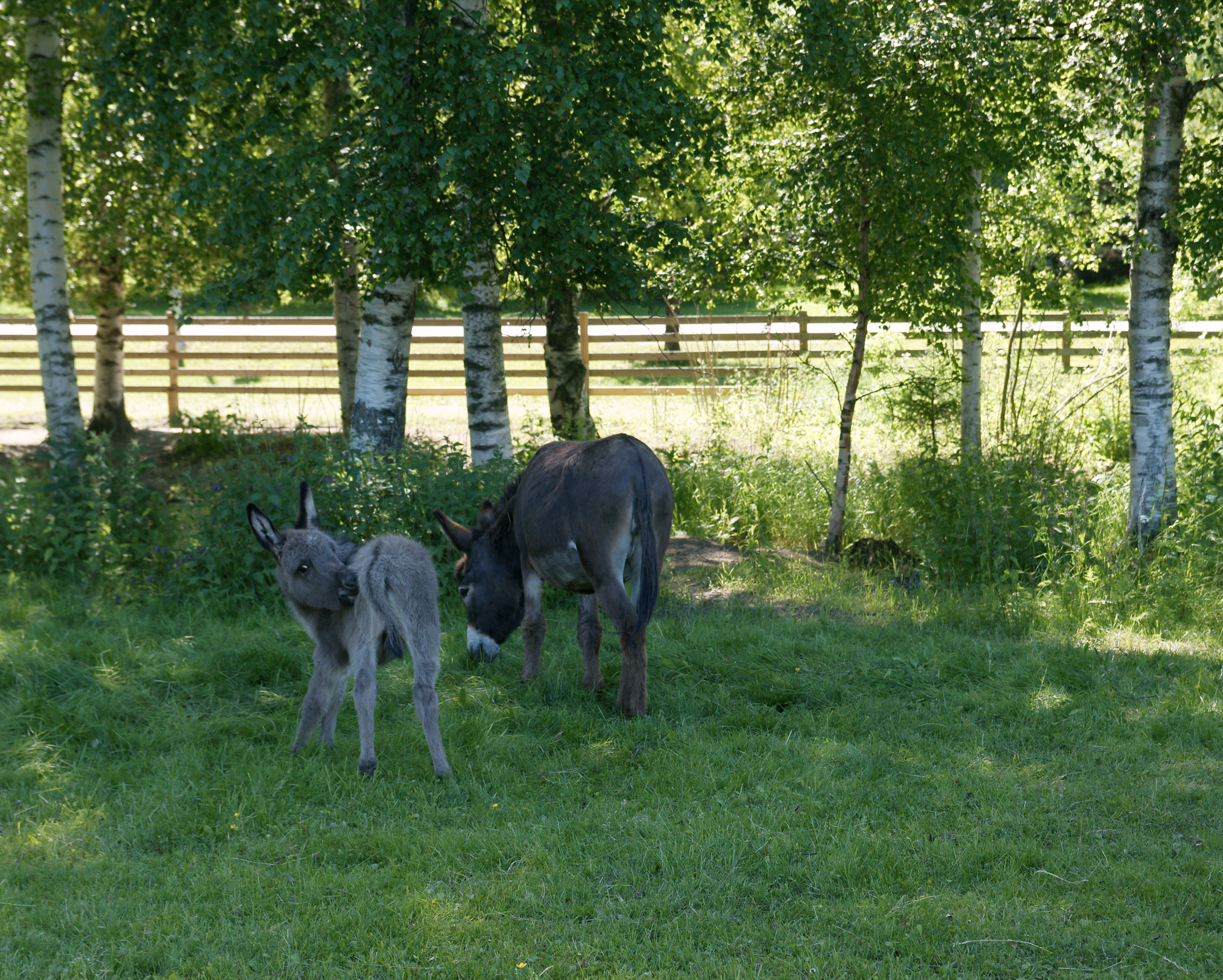
Donkeys at Kirjurinluoto

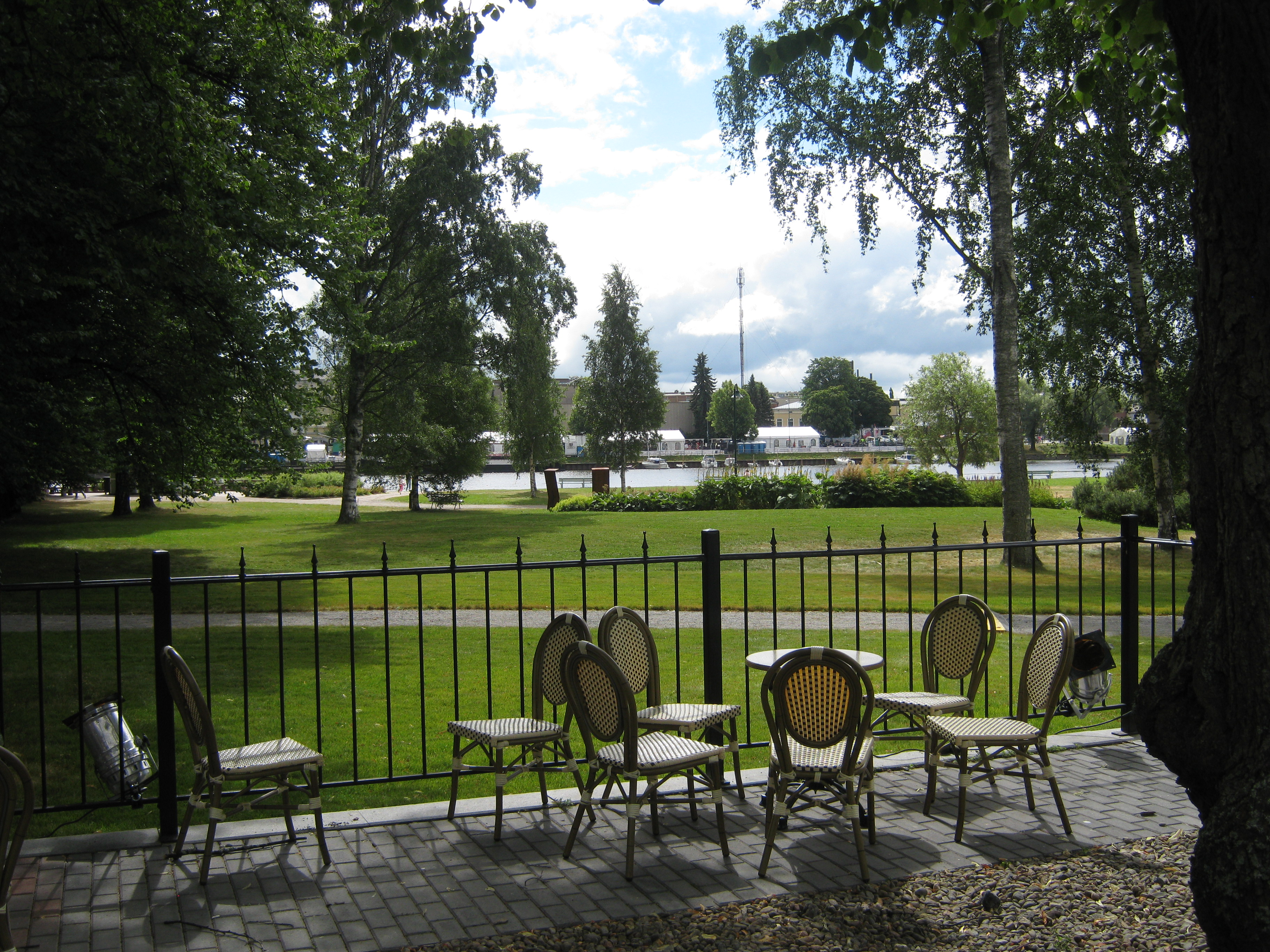
A view from the restaurant

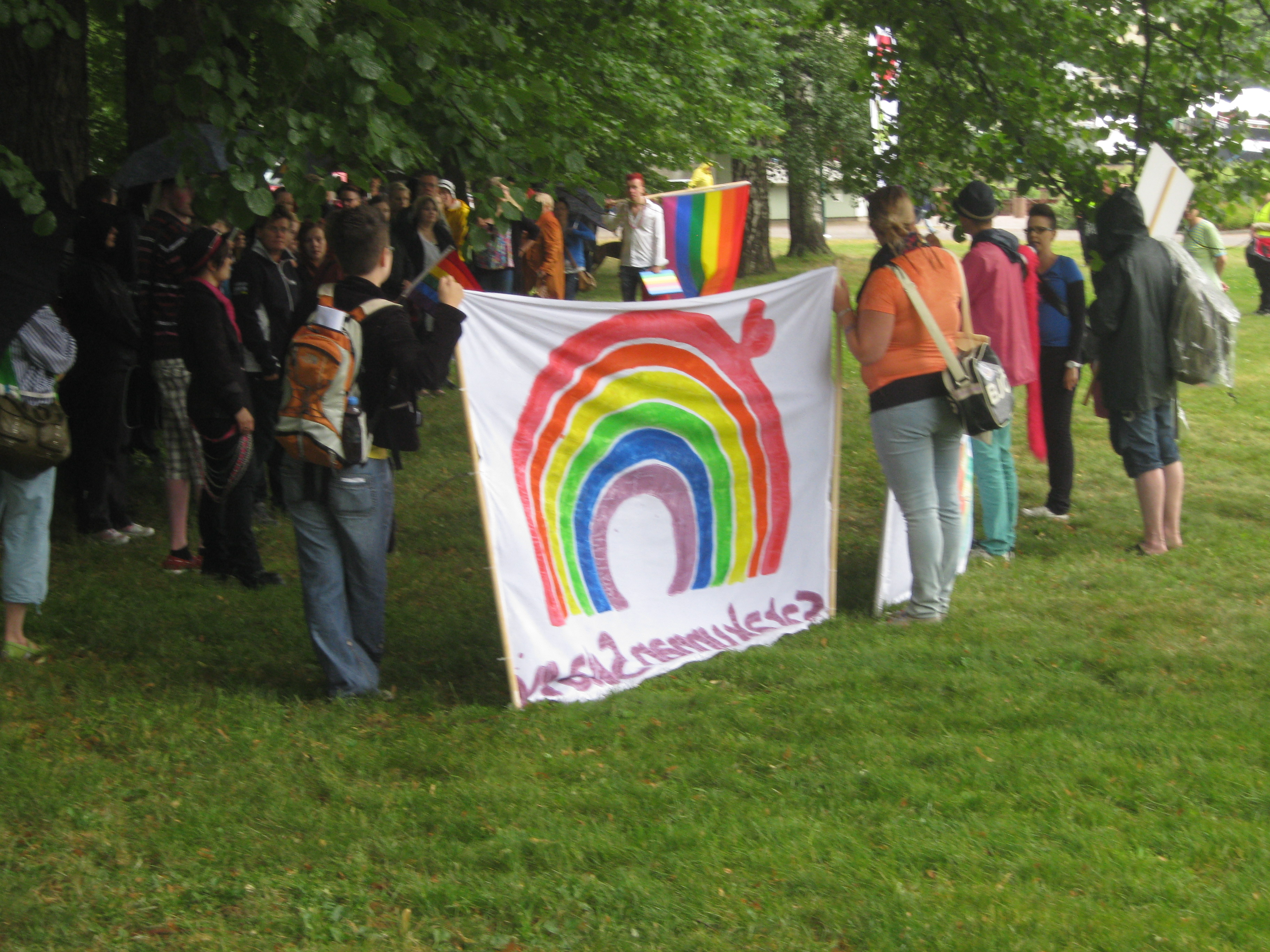
Pori Pride 2013 at Kirjurinluoto

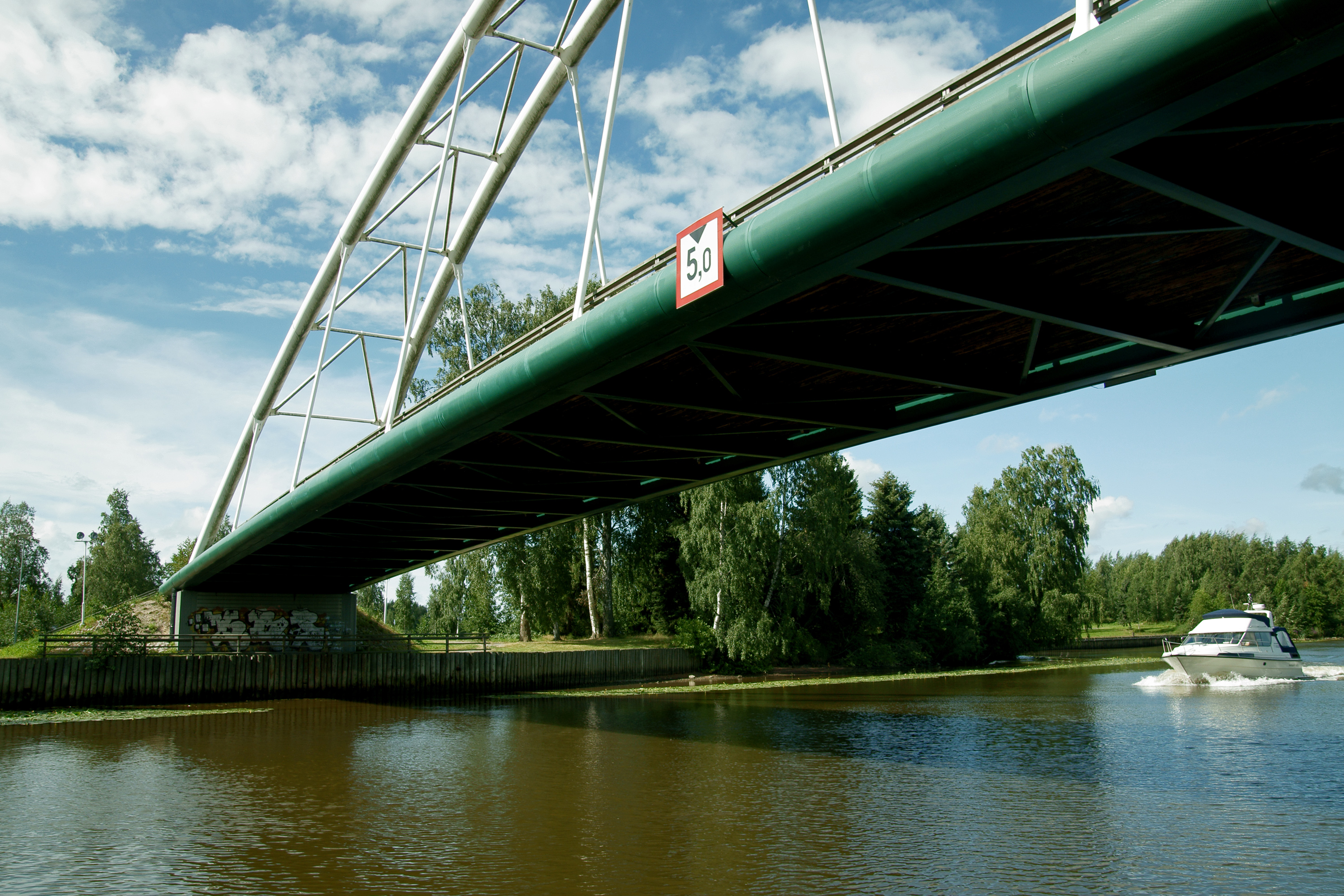
A pedestrian bridge
