= 40th Anniversary of the Rocket Man =

2012–13 concert tour by Elton John

- World tour by Elton John
- Poster to the concert in Nashville, USA
- Location: Asia • Europe • North America • Oceania • South America
- Start date: 10 November 2012
- End date: 12 September 2013
- Legs: 6
- No. of shows: 45

Elton John concert chronology
- Greatest Hits Live (2011–12); 40th Anniversary of the Rocket Man (2012–13); The Diving Board Tour (2013–14)

40th Anniversary of the Rocket Man was a concert tour by Elton John in Oceania, Asia, North America, South America and Europe, celebrating the 40th anniversary of his top 20 hit single "Rocket Man".

== Background ==
40 years earlier, in April 1972, "Rocket Man" was released around the world. To celebrate the landmark anniversary of its release, John took celebrations globally for a world tour, returning to Australia for his record 42nd Sydney Entertainment Centre show, plus a special run of shows, some in parts of Australia he had never played in.

John added a second concert at the newly constructed Perth Arena on 10 November, opening the arena. George Michael had originally been scheduled to open the arena, but pulled out and John took his place.

Both the 2012 Greatest Hits Live tour and the 2012 legs of the 40th Anniversary of the Rocket Man tour made it onto Billboard's "Top 25 Tours of 2012" at No. 19 with 36 shows, 28 of which were sell-outs. John performed to 240,381 people, making $32,920,986 (£20,946,700). On 22 March 2013 John's South American tour topped that week's Billboard Hot Tours. While in Brazil, he had played to 52,492 people and made $6,332,640. One of the Brazilian concerts, in Belo Horizonte, was sold out, the only sold out date of the tour.

== Controversies ==
John drew incredibly harsh criticism during his concert in Beijing when he dedicated the show to dissident artist Ai Weiwei. A state-owned newspaper accused the veteran British singer of being 'disrespectful' and said his actions could lead to a ban on other Western performers putting on shows in China. At the end of the show, John stunned his audience when he said he was dedicating the show to Weiwei. He said he was there to give tribute to Weiwei's 'honour and talent'. The Global Times, a paper run by the ruling Communist Parties, The People's Daily, said in an editorial: "John's unexpected action was disrespectful to the audience and the contract that he signed with the Chinese side, he forcibly added political content to the concert, which should have been nothing more than an entertaining performance. John's action will also make the relevant agencies further hesitate in the future when they invite foreign artists. John himself is a senior entertainment figure, but has raised difficulties for future arts exchanges between China and other countries."

It was later revealed that as a result of John's comments at his concert in Beijing that Chinese authorities were considering tightening concert rules so that only artists with University degrees could perform in the country. This would rule out any return to China for John. He was also questioned by Chinese authorities after the concert regarding his remarks.

Conservative campaigners demanded that John should cancel his concert in Kuala Lumpur, Malaysia. Although John's scheduled performance went ahead at the Genting Arena of Stars, he faced fierce opposition from Muslim activists who object to openly gay performers performing in Malaysia as homosexual activities are illegal in the country. John faced down similar protests when he performed his first ever concert in Malaysia at the same venue just a year before.

== Opening acts ==
- 2Cellos (12 November – 4 December 2012)
- Schmidt (14–18 November 2012, Melbourne)
- Pnau (16 November 2012, Sydney)

== Set list ==
This set list is representative of the first show in Perth. It does not represent all dates throughout the tour.

1. "The Bitch Is Back"
2. "Bennie and the Jets"
3. "Grey Seal"
4. "Levon"
5. "Tiny Dancer"
6. "Believe"
7. "Mona Lisas and Mad Hatters"
8. "Philadelphia Freedom"
9. "Candle in the Wind"
10. "Goodbye Yellow Brick Road"
11. "Rocket Man"
12. "Hey Ahab"
13. "I Guess That's Why They Call It the Blues"
14. "Funeral for a Friend/Love Lies Bleeding"
15. "Honky Cat"
16. "Sad Songs"
17. "Sacrifice"
18. "Daniel"
19. "Don't Let the Sun Go Down on Me"
20. "Are You Ready for Love"
21. "I'm Still Standing"
22. "Crocodile Rock"
23. "Saturday Night's Alright for Fighting"
24. "Your Song"
25. "Circle of Life"

== Tour dates ==
Date	City	Country	Venue
Oceania
10 November 2012	Perth	Australia	Perth Arena
12 November 2012	Perth	Australia	Perth Arena
14 November 2012	Canberra	Australia	Canberra Stadium
15 November 2012	Sydney	Australia	Sydney Entertainment Centre
16 November 2012^{[S]}	Sydney	Australia	Sydney Entertainment Centre
18 November 2012	Melbourne	Australia	Rod Laver Arena
20 November 2012	Launceston	Australia	Launceston Silverdome
Asia
23 November 2012	Shanghai	China	Mercedes-Benz Arena
25 November 2012	Beijing	China	MasterCard Center
27 November 2012	Seoul	South Korea	Olympic Gymnastics Arena
29 November 2012	Kuala Lumpur	Malaysia	Genting Arena of Stars
1 December 2012	Macau		CotaiArena
4 December 2012	Hong Kong		Hong Kong Convention and Exhibition Centre
6 December 2012	Guangzhou	China	Guangzhou International Sports Arena
8 December 2012	Quezon City	Philippines	Smart Araneta Coliseum
10 December 2012^{[S]}	Taipei	Taiwan	Nangang Exhibition Hall
13 December 2012	Bangkok	Thailand	IMPACT Arena
15 December 2012	Singapore		Singapore Indoor Stadium
South America
26 February 2013	Fortaleza	Brazil	Estádio Governador Plácido Castelo
27 February 2013	São Paulo	Brazil	Jockey Club de São Paulo
28 February 2013^{[A]}	Viña del Mar	Chile	Quinta Vergara Amphitheater
2 March 2013	Buenos Aires	Argentina	Estadio José Amalfitani
4 March 2013	Montevideo	Uruguay	Estadio Gran Parque Central
5 March 2013	Porto Alegre	Brazil	Estádio do São José
6 March 2013^{[S]}	Asunción	Paraguay	Yacht y Golf Club Paraguayo
8 March 2013	Brasília	Brazil	Centro de Convenções Internacional
9 March 2013	Belo Horizonte	Brazil	Mineirão Stadium
10 March 2013^{[S]}	Recife	Brazil	Chevrolet Hall
North America
16 March 2013	Memphis	United States	FedExForum
20 March 2013	Macon	United States	Macon Centreplex
22 March 2013	Montgomery	United States	Garrett Coliseum
23 March 2013	Chattanooga	United States	McKenzie Arena
28 March 2013	Houston	United States	Toyota Center
29 March 2013	Baton Rouge	United States	Baton Rouge River Center
30 March 2013	Biloxi	United States	Mississippi Coast Coliseum
3 April 2013	Dayton	United States	Nutter Center
5 April 2013	Nashville	United States	Bridgestone Arena
6 April 2013	Winston-Salem	United States	Lawrence Joel Veterans Memorial Coliseum
Europe
17 June 2013^{[B]}	Murten	Switzerland	Pantschau Murtensee
18 June 2013	Vienna	Austria	Wiener Stadthalle
19 June 2013	Salzburg	Austria	Salzburgarena
21 June 2013	Caen	France	Zénith de Caen
22 June 2013	Skive Fjord	Denmark	Rosenlund Parken
23 June 2013^{[C]}	Cork	Ireland	The Docklands
29 June 2013	Tallinn	Estonia	Tallinn Song Festival Grounds
3 July 2013^{[D]}	St. Malô du Bois	France	Poupet Open Air Theatre
4 September 2013	Leeds	England	Leeds Arena
5 September 2013	Berlin	Germany	Waldbühne
7 September 2013	Magdeburg	Germany	Domplatz
8 September 2013^{[E]}	Isle of Wight	England	Robin Hill Country Park
12 September 2013^{[F]}	London	England	The Roundhouse

Festivals and other miscellaneous performances
^{A} This concert was part of "Festival de Viña del Mar 2013"
^{B} This concert was part of "Stars of Sounds Open Air Murten 2013"
^{C} This concert was part of "Live at the Marquee"
^{D} This concert was part of "Festival de Poupet"
^{E} This concert was part of "Bestival"
^{F} This concert was part of "iTunes Festival"
^{S} This concert was solo concert.

Cancellations and rescheduled shows

18 November 2011	Bogor	Sentul International Convention Center	Moved to Mata Elang International Stadium, never rescheduled.
18 November 2012	Mackay	Virgin Australia Stadium	Cancelled. Replaced with Melbourne concert.
29 November 2012	Busan	Busan Exhibition and Convention Center	Cancelled. Replaced by Kuala Lumpur concert.
12 March 2013	Quito	Unconfirmed Venue	Cancelled.
15 March 2013	Birmingham	BJCC Arena	Cancelled.
15 June 2013	Murten	Stars of Sounds Open Air Festival	Rescheduled to 17 June 2013 due to band illness.
5 July 2013	Halle	Gerry Weber Stadion	Rescheduled to 6 July 2014.
6 July 2013	Mainz	Nordmole Zollhafen	Rescheduled to 19 July 2014.
7 July 2013	Heilbronn	Frankenstadion Heilbronn	Cancelled.
9 July 2013	Barolo	Piazza Colbert	Cancelled.
11 July 2013	Dresden	Theaterplatz vor der Semperoper	Postponed to 11 July 2014.
12 July 2013	London	Barclaycard's British Summer Time Festival	Cancelled.
13 July 2013	Yekaterinburg	Yekaterinburg Sports Palace	Cancelled.
14 July 2013	Krasnodar	Krasnodar Basket-Hall	Cancelled.
17 July 2013	Lörrach	Stimmen-Festival	Rescheduled to 23 July 2014.
19 July 2013	Carhaix	Vieilles Charrues Festival	Cancelled.
20 July 2013	Calella	Festival Jardins de Cap Roig	Cancelled.
21 July 2013	Regensburg	Schloss St. Emmeram	Cancelled.
23 July 2013	Carcassonne	Festival de Carcassonne	Cancelled.
24 July 2013	Monte Carlo	Sporting Monte-Carlo	Cancelled.

=== Box office score data ===
Venue	City	Tickets sold / available	Gross revenue
Perth Arena	Perth	21,782 / 21,782 (100%)	$3,919,890
Canberra Stadium	Canberra	10,430 / 11,320 (92%)	$1,718,940
Entertainment Centre	Sydney	18,056 / 18,056 (100%)	$3,059,390
Rod Laver Arena	Melbourne	9,231 / 11,412 (81%)	$1,584,640
Silverdome	Launceston	5,142 / 5,981 (86%)	$940,104
Jockey Club	São Paulo	10,195 / 12,000 (85%)	$2,662,790
Estadio Zequinha	Porto Alegre	11,294 / 13,500 (84%)	$1,712,440
Centro de Convencoes	Brasília	5,862 / 6,900 (85%)	$1,104,140
Estadio do Mineirao	Belo Horizonte	32,176 / 32,176 (100%)	$2,405,660
Chevrolet Hall	Recife	3,160 / 4,600 (69%)	$1,110,400
Bridgestone Arena	Nashville	14,896 / 14,896 (100%)	$1,177,534
Total		142,224 / 152,623 (93%)	$21,395,928

== Tour band ==
- Elton John – piano, vocals
- Davey Johnstone – guitar, banjo, backing vocals
- Matt Bissonette – bass guitar, backing vocals
- Kim Bullard – keyboards
- John Mahon – percussion, backing vocals
- Nigel Olsson – drums, backing vocals
- Lisa Stone – backing vocals
- Rose Stone – backing vocals
- Tata Vega – backing vocals
- Jean Witherspoon – backing vocals

During the 2012 Asian tour the 2Cellos left the Elton John Band to pursue other projects following the release of their album In2ition.
