= Folkets Park in Kävlinge =

Coordinates: 55°47′16.15″N 13°6′55.66″E

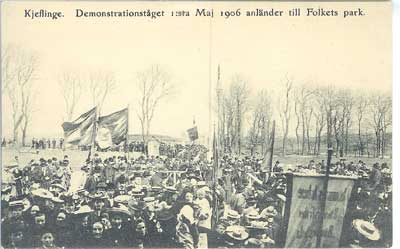
Demonstration and opening procedure May Day 1906 in Kävlinge Folkets park.

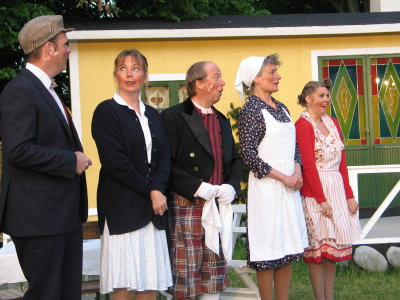
Amateurtheater in Kävlinge Folkets Park 2005

Folkets Park in Kävlinge, Sweden is a local society who started in 1905 by the workers of Kävlinge shoe factory. In 1905 many people in Kävlinge lived in deep poverty. The factory plant manager allowed workers to explore grounds for growing food besides the factory.

On 28 April 1905 the workers bought land north and west of the factory plant area. Half of it was dedicated to growing food, and the other half to a park for meetings and local pleasures, like dancing and other local festivities. Two days before May Day 1906 the park was officially opened.

Since 2002 the park society has been relocated. A new start with children's theater, local amateur theater and local celebrations has put the park in a new view in Kävlinge. The visitors today come in thousands every year, and many local family traditions have their meetings in the park every summer.
