= Refugee and Migrant Justice =

UK charitable organisation

Refugee and Migrant Justice (RMJ, founded as Refugee Legal Centre) was a charitable organisation in the United Kingdom which provided legal advice and representation to those who seek protection under the Geneva Conventions and human rights laws. Refugee and Migrant Justice also lobbied on behalf of cases both individually and collectively, and was concerned with monitoring public policy in the area of asylum.

== Background ==
Refugee and Migrant Justice was founded in 1992 to be a centre for the provision of quality legal representation for those seeking protection under the 1951 Convention Relating to the Status of Refugees and those who feared breaches of their human rights. The roots of the Refugee Legal Centre went back to the Refugee Unit of the UK Immigration Advisory Service, which was founded in 1976 as a legal assistance project for asylum seekers funded by the Office of the UN High Commissioner for Refugees.

As well as asylum seekers, RMJ represented unaccompanied children, and women trafficked into the sex industry.

== Governance ==
Refugee and Migrant Justice was a registered charity. The quality of its work was subject to the regulations of the Legal Services Commission and the Office of the Immigration Services Commissioner. It was governed by an independent Board of Trustees, who were:

- President: Professor Guy Goodwin-Gill, Fellow of All Souls College, University of Oxford
- Chairman: Charles Morland
- CEO: Caroline Slocock
- Yemane Tsegai
- Andrew Hutchinson
- John Humpston
- Hilary Pinder
- Ruth Bundey
- Annie Ledger

== Awards ==
In 2005, Refugee and Migrant Justice was given a human rights award from Liberty, Justice and the Law Society for 'consistent and fearless use of the law to protect human rights and hold immigration and asylum policies up to the scrutiny of the courts'.

== Funding and closure ==
Refugee and Migrant Justice was funded through a contract with the Legal Services Commission and by a relatively small level of donations. In 2009/10 it had annual income of £15 million, and was the second-largest recipient of legal aid.

The Ministry of Justice had implemented reforms to the legal aid system, introducing fixed-fee payments in 2007 followed by a transition to payment only on completion of each case. With some cases being protracted and therefore unpaid for up to two years, the amount owed to RMJ by the Commission escalated to £2 million, precipitating a funding crisis. On 16 June 2010, Refugee & Migrant Justice was placed in administration, from which it did not recover.

An emergency public appeal raised £76,000 within 24 hours, but this was insufficient to rescue RMJ, and donations were returned. RMJ's 300 staff lost their jobs and 9,000 current clients were left without representation.

The Legal Services Commission made arrangements for RMJ's clients to be transferred to new advisers within six weeks, and the Home Office said that they would not be disadvantaged by the transfer.

Justice Secretary Kenneth Clarke claimed that RMJ's collapse was not due to delayed payments, but to RMJ's failure to improve efficiency as other providers had done.
