= Pori Jazz =

Jazz festival in Pori, Finland

Coordinates: 61°29′45.89″N 21°46′50.39″E

- A festival poster for the first Pori Jazz in 1966
- Genre: Jazz, blues, soul, funk, hip hop, Afro-Cuban, world music, pop music
- Dates: mid-July
- Locations: Pori, Finland
- Years active: 1966-present
- Website: porijazz.fi

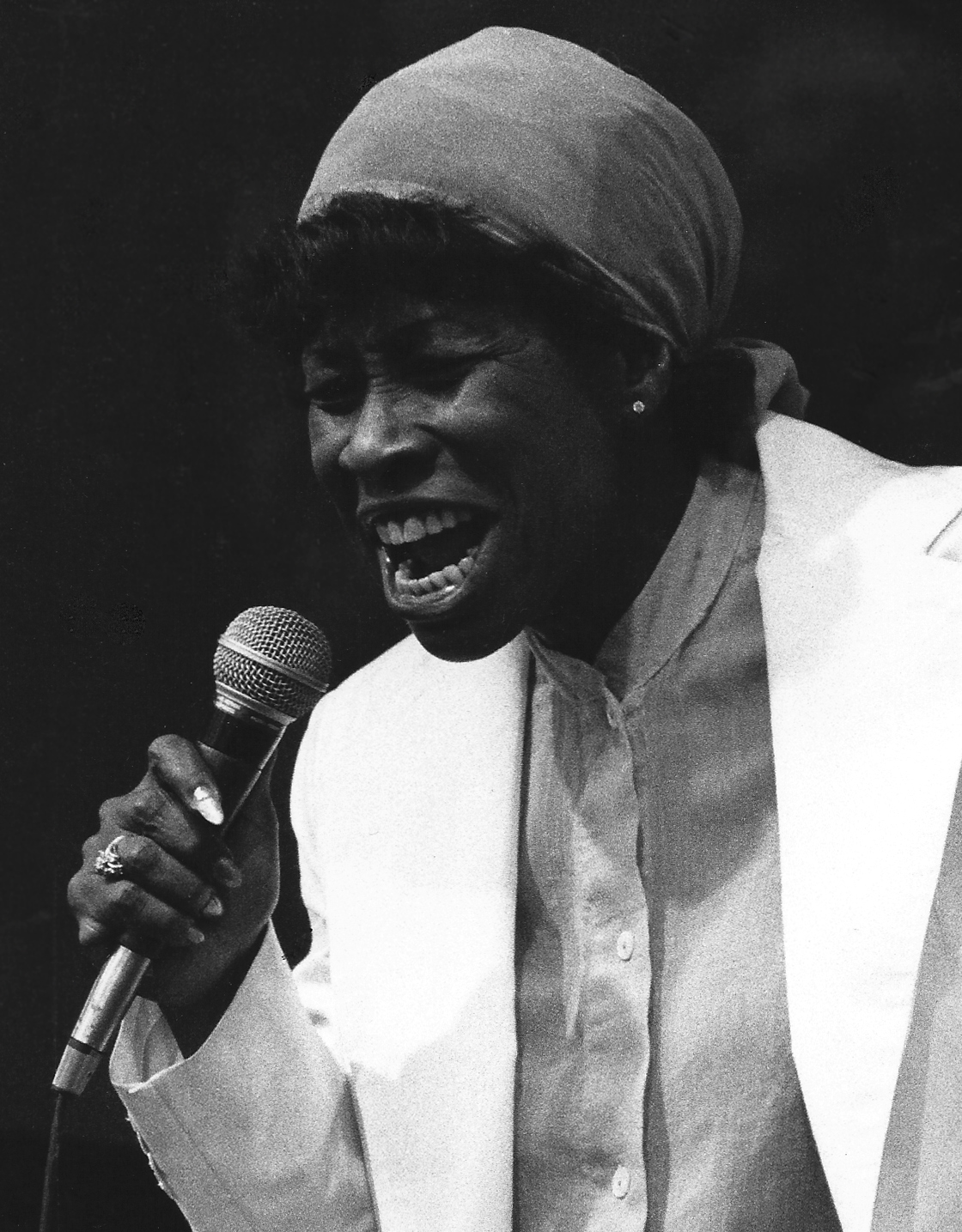
Betty Carter performing at Pori Jazz in 1978

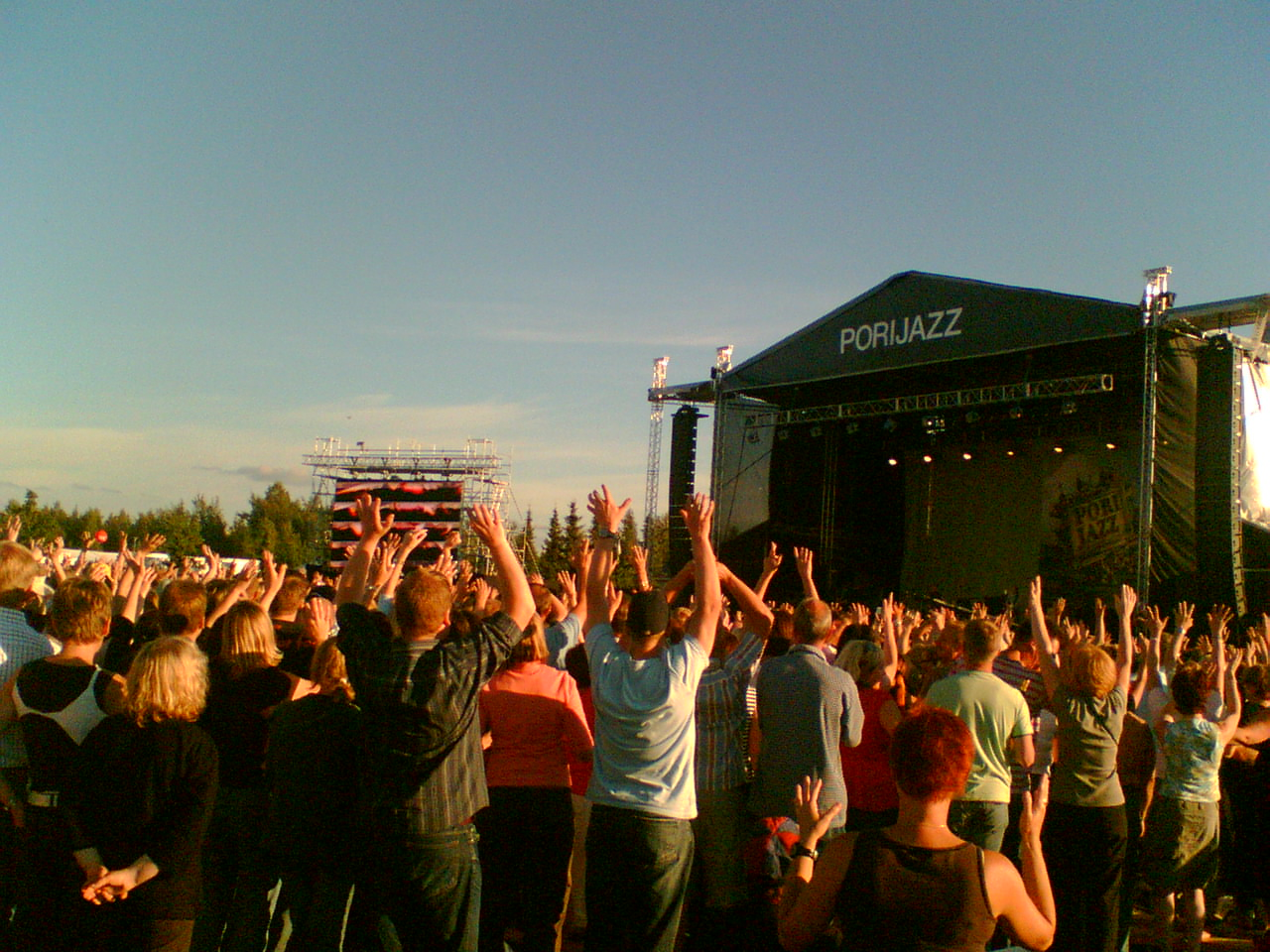
Sting at Pori Jazz in 2006

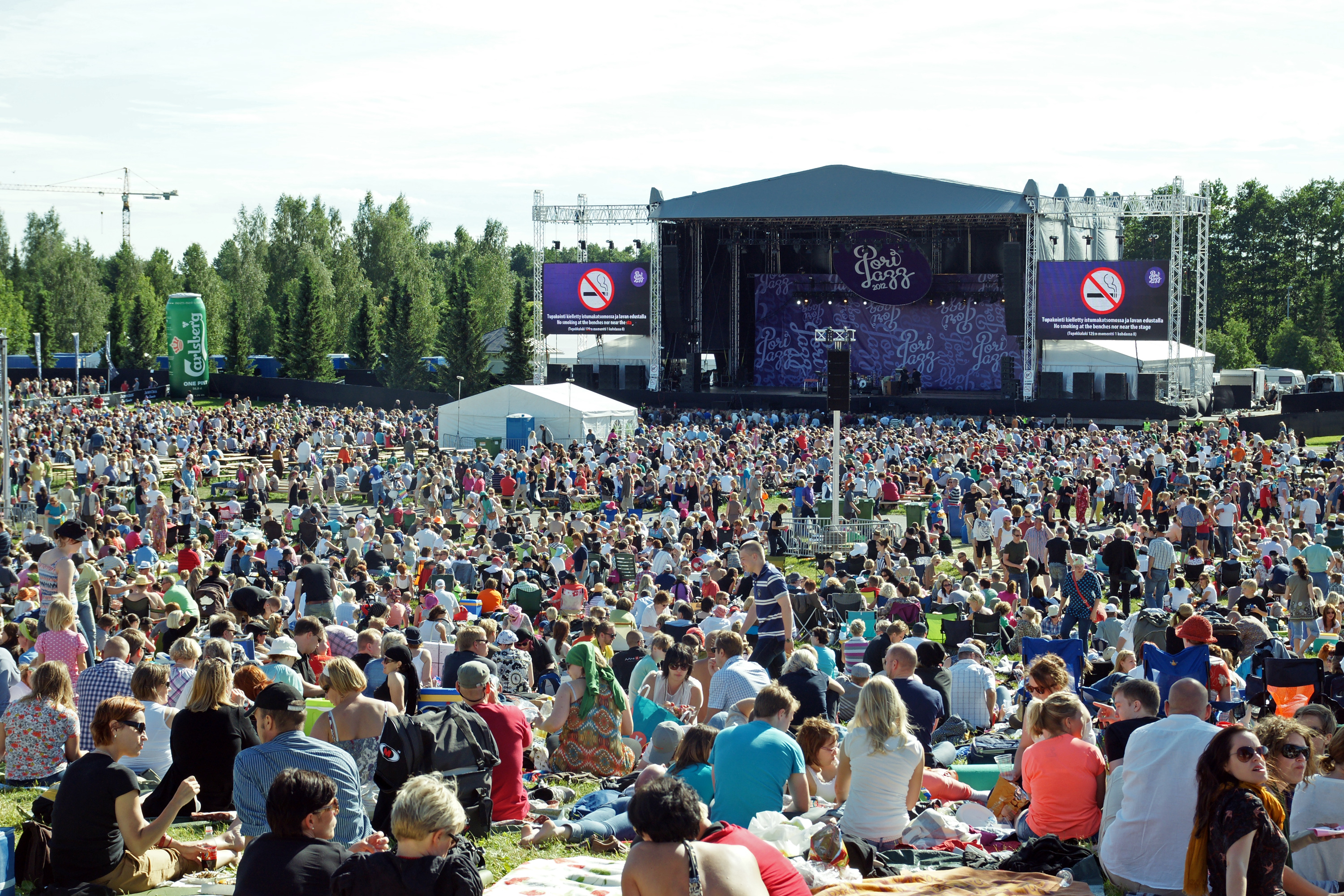
Pori Jazz in 2012

Pori Jazz is a large international jazz festival, held annually during the month of July in the coastal city of Pori (a population of 82,809 in January 2010), Finland. It is one of the oldest and best known jazz festivals in Europe, having been arranged every year since 1966.

== History ==
The first, 2-day-long Pori Jazz Festival was held at the Kirjurinluoto island in July 1966 with 1500 visitors. Audiences grew from year to year and the duration of the festival was also increased. Between 1975 and 1984 it became established as a four-day event. Since 1985 the festival has lasted nine days with audiences numbering from 50,000 to 60,000. In the early 1990s the numbers reached 100,000 visitors and in 21st century about 120,000–160,000 people are visiting the festival every summer. In 2014 Pori Jazz had its 49th edition and is already planning its 50th anniversary in 2015. At the moment Pori Jazz Festival is the biggest, best known and most popular summer event in Finland.

The first festival was based on acoustic jazz but little by little electric jazz and other rhythm music, blues, soul, funk, hip-hop and Cuban and Brazilian music took foot. Now Pori Jazz offers a contingent of artists ranging from long-established figures to up-and-coming stars. About 70 percent of the program is admission free.

Pori Jazz has managed to keep in the lead among Finnish and international festivals for already over 45 years. The festival atmosphere in particular, created by the music, people, fine services and unique milieu, is second to none and highly appreciated among the visitors. The festival has become an experience the visitors want to repeat every summer. There are over 100 concerts in 11 different venues during 9 festival days. A special Pori Jazz Kids Festival is also arranged for children.

The 49th edition of Pori Jazz Festival was held from 12 to 20 July 2014.

The main venue, Kirjurinluoto Arena, is the only open-air concert park in Finland that is built only for concerts and other happenings. The size of the arena is 5 hectares (12 acres) for amphitheater-type concerts plus 22 hectares (54 acres) for camping. As well as the main venue, which requires a festival ticket to enter, there is a "Jazz street" in the centre of Pori, along the shore of the Kokemäenjoki river, holding smaller music events and clubs as well as street food restaurants and bars. The outdoor music events on the "Jazz street" are free of charge, but events held in clubs might require an entrance fee.

Numerous world-famous musicians (including, for example, Tori Amos, Kylie Minogue, Art Blakey, James Brown, Phil Collins, Chick Corea, Miles Davis, Alicia Keys, Paul Simon, Jamiroquai, Macy Gray, Mary J. Blige, Erykah Badu, Paul Anka, Kanye West, Sting and others) have performed at the festival through the years, as well as lesser-known groups from Finland and elsewhere. Musical genres covered at Pori Jazz include varieties of jazz, blues, soul, funk, hip hop, Afro-Cuban, world music, and occasionally even some forms of pop music.

== Pori Jazz performers (partial list) ==
- Alicia Keys
- B. B. King
- Benny Goodman
- Björk
- Blood, Sweat & Tears featuring David Clayton Thomas
- Bo Diddley
- Bob Dylan
- Bobby McFerrin
- Bomfunk MC's
- Boz Scaggs
- Buena Vista Social Club
- Cab Calloway
- Chaka Khan
- Chick Corea
- Christina Aguilera
- Chuck Berry
- David Byrne
- De La Soul
- Dizzy Gillespie
- Don Grolnick
- Don Johnson Big Band
- Duffy
- Earth, Wind & Fire
- Elton John
- Elvis Costello
- Erykah Badu
- Fats Domino
- Gary Moore
- George Clinton
- Gloria Gaynor
- Grover Washington, Jr.
- Herbie Hancock
- Hurts
- Ina Forsman
- Isaac Hayes
- James Brown
- Jamiroquai
- Jethro Tull
- Joe Cocker
- Joe Satriani
- Jorma Kaukonen
- Kanye West
- Kool & The Gang
- Kylie Minogue
- Lauryn Hill
- Little Richard
- Massive Attack
- Manhattan Transfer
- Mary J. Blige
- Miles Davis
- Muddy Waters
- N.E.R.D
- Oscar Peterson
- Paleface
- Paul Anka
- Paul Simon
- Pet Shop Boys
- Phil Collins
- Ray Charles
- Ringo Starr
- The Roots
- Santana
- Seun Kuti
- Shaggy
- Shakti
- Sly & The Family Stone
- Stevie Ray Vaughan
- Stevie Wonder
- Sting
- Ted Curson
- Tito Puente
- Tom Jones
- Tori Amos
- Toto
- UB40
- Van Morrison
- Youssou N'Dour
- Ziggy Marley

== See also ==
- List of jazz festivals
