= St. Olaf's Church, Ulvila =

Medieval fieldstone church in Ulvila, Finland

St. Olaf's Church
- Pyhän Olavin kirkko (Finnish); S:t Olofs kyrka (Swedish)
- Ulvila Church
- Ulvilan kirkko (Finnish); Ulvsby kyrka (Swedish)
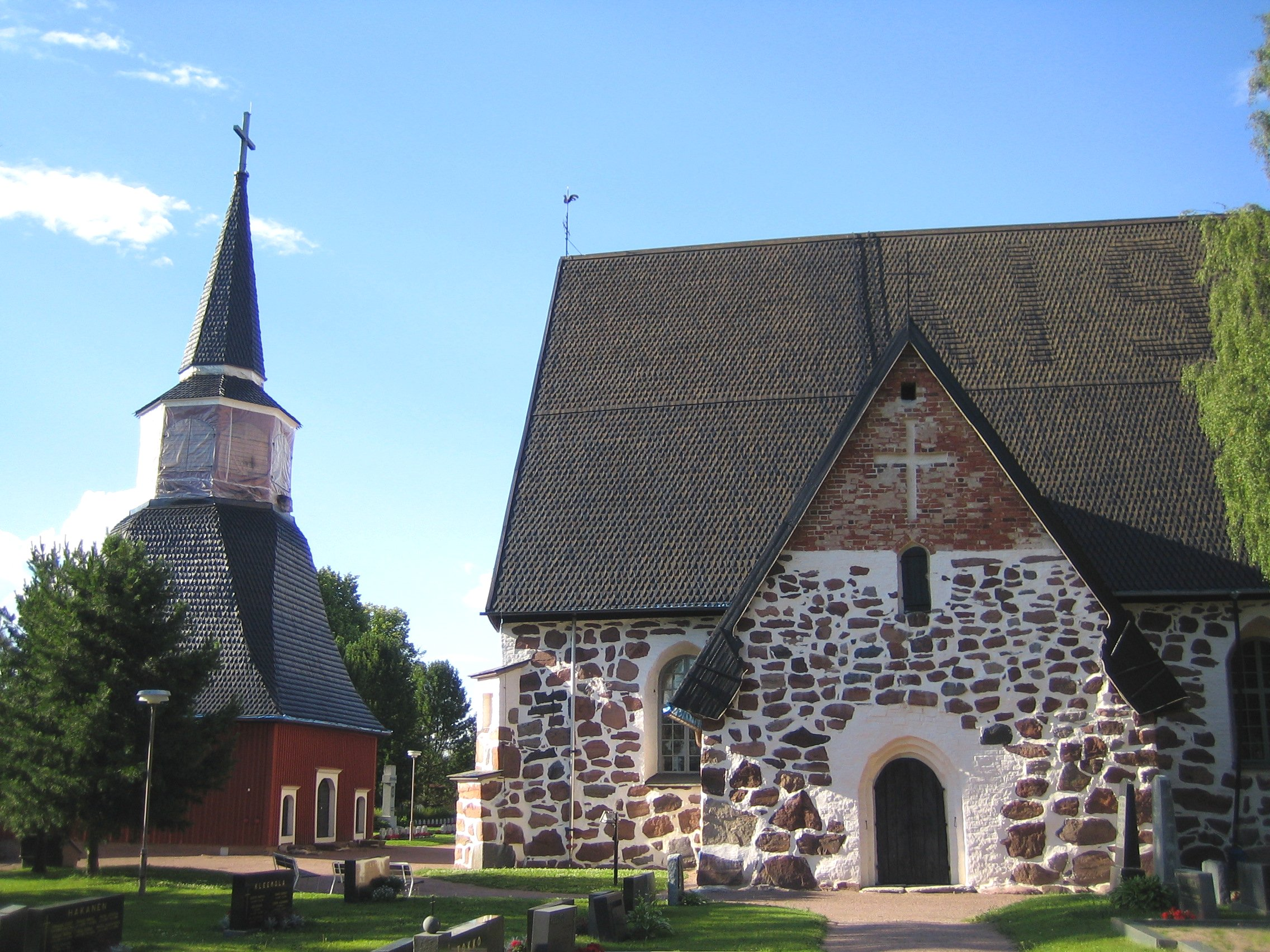
- St. Olaf's Church
- 61°26′37″N 21°52′57″E
- Location: Saarentie 2, Vanha-Ulvila
- Country: Finland
- Denomination: Evangelical Lutheran Church of Finland
- Previous denomination: Roman Catholic
- Website: Official website

History
- Status: Church
- Founded: c. 13th century
- Dedication: Olaf II of Norway
- Consecrated: c. 1347

Architecture
- Functional status: Active
- Heritage designation: Cultural Heritage Site of National Significance
- Designated: 2009
- Architect: Master of Ulvila
- Style: Medieval
- Years built: c. 1495–1510

Specifications
- Capacity: seats 450

Administration
- Archdiocese: Archdiocese of Turku
- Parish: Ulvila parish (Ulvilan seurakunta)

St. Olaf's Church (Finnish: Pyhän Olavin kirkko, Swedish: S:t Olofs kyrka), also known as Ulvila Church (Finnish: Ulvilan kirkko, Swedish: Ulvsby kyrka), is a church of the Evangelical Lutheran Church of Finland in Ulvila, Finland. The church is considered one of the best-preserved medieval fieldstone churches in Finland and is the only remaining structure from the medieval town of Ulvila. St. Olaf has been the patron saint of the church since before 1429.

St. Olaf's Church is situated on the Kirkkojuopa, a minor branch of the Kokemäenjoki, two kilometres (1.2 mi) from the modern town centre of Ulvila and eight kilometres (5.0 mi) outside the city of Pori. During the summer months it functions as a road church along connecting road 2440.

== History ==
During the 13th and 14th centuries, the estuary of the Kokemäenjoki was located in the Ulvila area and direct access to the sea made the settlement's trading post one of the two most important markets in the region, along with Kokemäki (Teljä). The medieval settlement of Ulvila, which received town rights in 1365, was situated in Vanhakylä (Swedish: Gammalby), also called Vanha-Ulvila (lit. 'Old Ulvila'), on the north bank of the Kokemäenjoki, which now forms the eastern part of Ulvila's urban area. Ulvila's town rights were transferred to Pori in 1558, after the shoreline and harbor relocated due to post-glacial rebound.

=== Liikistö Church ===
The first town church in Ulvila was built in the area of Liikistö, a trade post some 1.5 kilometres (0.93 mi) southeast of what later became the medieval settlement of Ulvila, and belonged to the Kokemäki parish until the independent Ulvila parish was founded (by 1344 at the latest). Historian Ilkka Kronqvist suggested a church existed in Liikistö by the early years of the 13th century, which would make it the third-oldest church site in Finland after Ravattula Church in Kaarina and Koroinen Church in the Koroinen district of Turku.

Most decrees, certificates, and letters related to the early history of Ulvila and Liikistö were destroyed in the Pori fire of 1698 but a surviving index of documents provides some limited context regarding the early churches in the area. The earliest record was an order issued by Ragvald II, Bishop of Åbo in 1311, which concerned the building of a stone church at Liikistö (de Templo lapideo in Lijkis). The foundation of a stone church was constructed but work on the building was abandoned and it was left unfinished. Elements of the stone foundation walls can still be seen at Liikistö and a memorial cross has been erected within the unfinished building's outline.

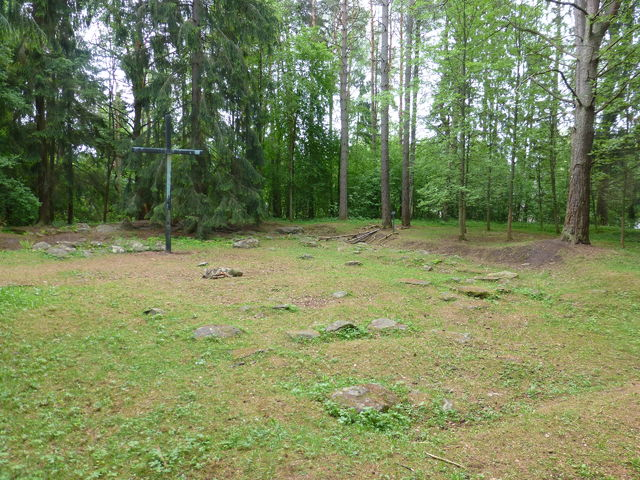
The foundation of Liikistö's unfinished stone church

Archaeological excavations at Liikistö during the 1930s, led by Kronqvist, revealed many grave markers and carved stone pavers in the church cemetery. A stone monument that had once been standing was also found in the area, with a shape similar to the Kalevanpoika scythe-stick that stands in the churchyard of St. Peter's Church in the village of Untamala in Laitila. Kronqvist also mentioned the discovery of coins from the 13th and 14th centuries in a 1938 report. A total of 298 graves have been found in the cemetery and radiocarbon analysis of the graves supports the theory that the cemetery was in use from the first half of the 1200s through the 1300s.

Further excavations during 2002 to 2003 identified the remains of a burnt wooden wall in the corner of the cemetery, where the church was thought to have been located. Radiocarbon dating of the material dated the building to the 14th century. Furthermore, colored glass was found in the fill of graves below the wall line, suggesting a building with colored glass windows was present before the construction of the building that formed the wall trace. Thus, it is quite possible that Kronqvist's hypothesis was correct and an earlier chapel stood at the site in the 1200s.

=== Ulvila wooden churches ===
The Kokemäenjoki receded around Liikistö during the 14th century, resulting in a shift of settlement and trade to Ulvila, which received town rights in 1365. At the end of the 13th century, there were two wooden churches in the area: Liikistö Church, which served the Swedish peasant-settler community in Liikistö, and a wooden church located on the site of the current Ulvila Church, which served the core population of the town of Ulvila. It is possible the church in Ulvila operated in connection with the Guild of Saint Gertrude, a German merchants guild created in Stockholm in the 14th century.

In 1332, Benedictus II Gregor, Bishop of Åbo, issued an order to build a new church on the site of the existing church in Ulvila. The new building was apparently completed before Hemming of Turku visited Satakunta to perform several church consecrations in 1346. An official document certifying the consecration of the Ulvila Church cemetery in 1347 was one of the records indexed prior to the 1698 Pori fire and provides the only certain date relating to the early churches. With the establishment of the Ulvila parish and consecration of the Ulvila Church, the Liikistö Church fell out of use as the congregations merged and the ecclesiastical activities of the region focused on the new wooden church.

The wooden church building completed in the 1340s was entirely destroyed in a fire in 1429. Construction of a new wooden church on the site soon began and the new wood building was finished around 1430, with support from the Bishop of Roskilde, the Bishop of Liepāja, and the Archbishop of Lund, who granted a 40-day absolution to those who participated in the project. The new church stood for more than sixty years, until it was demolished to make way for a new stone structure in the 1490s.

=== Ulvila stone church ===
Ulvila's stone church was constructed over a continuous span of about fifteen years to a preconceived blueprint, beginning around 1495. The design is attributed to the so-called Master of Ulvila, a Swedish master architect from Dalarna, who was hired by Olof Drake, owner of the nearby homestead of Isokartano. It is the only church in Finland designed by the Master of Ulvila, however, his legacy was carried on in Satakunta by a stonemason who was his apprentice. Archeologist Markus Hiekkanen has dubbed the mason the Master of Huittinen, as the Huittinen Church in Huittinen appears to have been his first church building project.

The sacristy was the first element to be completed circa 1495, followed by the congregation hall around 1500. Completion of the church porch in 1510 marked the end of the principal church construction.

=== Additions and renovations ===
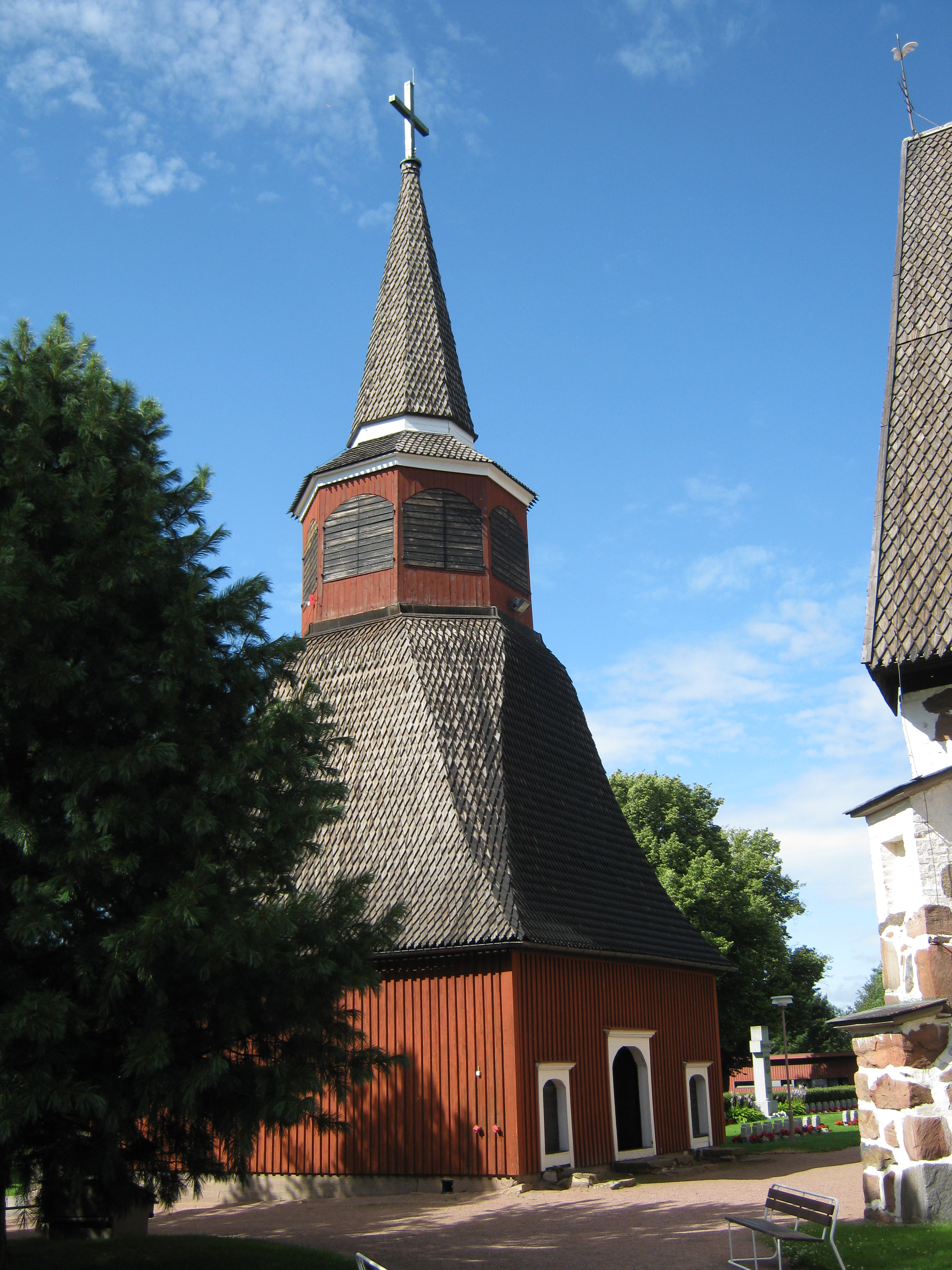
The belfry in 2002.

The belfry in the southwestern Finnish style was completed in 1757, though the original onion dome was replaced by a steeple designed by Swedish architect Georg Theodor Chiewitz in 1862.

Two Finnish noblemen, colonel Axel Kurck and stadtholder Gödik Fincke, a commander at the Cudgel War, are buried at the church.

During the 2005 renovation, archaeologists discovered the largest medieval coin treasure in Finland. It was buried under the sacristy wall in late 14th century. The hoard included 1,476 silver coins.

== See also ==
- Medieval stone churches in Finland
