= Gödik Fincke =

Finnish-born Swedish stadtholder

- Born: c. 1546; Lammi, Kingdom of Sweden (now Finland)
- Died: 1617 (70–71 years); Ulvila, Swedish Empire (now Finland)
- Military career
- Allegiance: Sweden
- Rank: Stadtholder
- Conflicts: Livonian War; Cudgel War; War against Sigismund

Gödik Gustafsson Fincke (c. 1546 – 1617) was a Finnish-born member of the Swedish nobility and military officer who served as the stadtholder of Olavinlinna Castle.

== Life ==
During the Livonian War he served in the Swedish military and was severely wounded 1573 in a battle by the Koluvere Castle in Estonia. Fincke was then transferred to administrative duties. In 1582, he was named as the stadtholder of the Olavinlinna Castle in Savonia. In 1596–1597 Fincke took part in suppressing the revolting Finnish peasants in the Cudgel War. In the 1598–1599 War against Sigismund, Olavinlinna became the last stronghold of Sigismund's supporters as his brother Sten Fincke fled to the castle. Olavinlinna soon surrendered to the troops of Charles IX without any resistance, Sten was executed in the Åbo bloodbath and Gödik expelled of his post.

Fincke spent his last years in Ulvila, Satakunta, where he died in 1617. Fincke and his spouse, Elisabeth Boije are buried to the St. Olaf's Church in Ulvila.
