= Vanhakylä =

District of Ulvila, Finland

Coordinates: 61°26′05.6″N 21°53′49.0″E

Vanhakylä Gammalby (Swedish) Vanha-Ulvila (Finnish)
- District of Ulvila
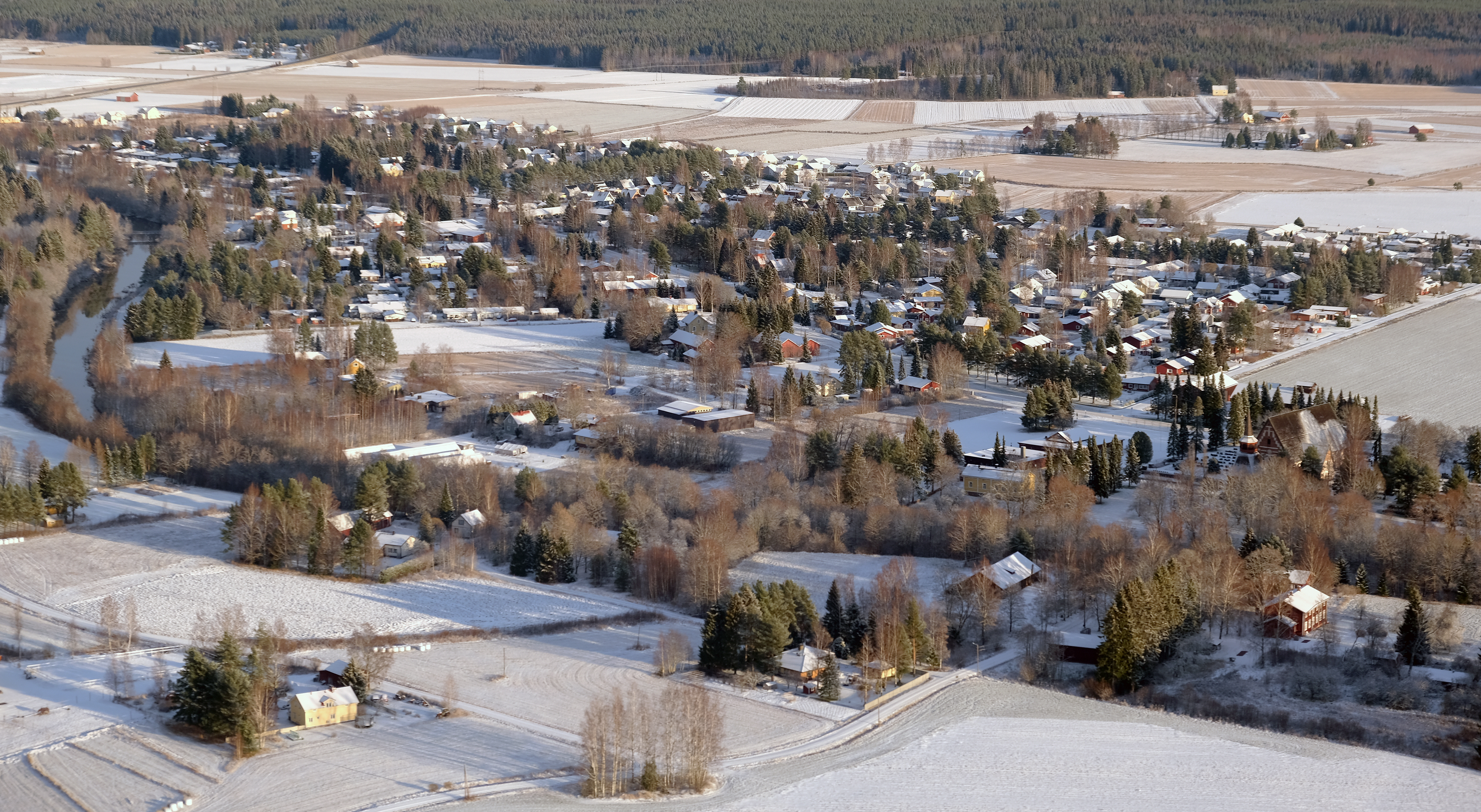
- Ulvilan kirkonseutu with the Ulvila Church (right) and the Mynsteri residential area
- Etymology: 'Old Village' or 'Old Ulvila'
- Interactive map of Vanhakylä
- Country: Finland
- Region: Satakunta
- Sub-region: Pori sub-region
- Municipality: Ulvila
- Sub-district areas: Krapisto; Loukkura; Mukulamäki; Mynsteri; Palonpää

Population (2015)
  - Total: 4,326

Vanhakylä (Swedish: Gammalby, lit. 'Old Village') or Vanha-Ulvila (lit. 'Old Ulvila') is a district of Ulvila in the Pori sub-region of Satakunta in southwestern Finland. The Kokemäenjoki divides the town centre of Ulvila into two parts – Vanhakylä constitutes the eastern half, on the northern bank of the Kokemäenjoki, and the western half is the district of Friitala, on the river's southern bank.

The medieval town of Ulvila was located in the modern district of Vanhakylä, from which the district's name is derived. Situated outside of the core of Vanhakylä, the Ulvila Church is the only remaining building from the medieval settlement. The Ulvila Church and surroundings were designated a Cultural Heritage Site of National Significance by the Finnish Heritage Agency in 2009.

== Transportation ==
The Kokemäenjoki divides the town centre of Ulvila into two parts – the western portion is the district of Friitala on the southern bank of the Kokemäenjoki, and the eastern portion is Vanhakylä, on the northern bank of the Kokemäenjoki. The districts are linked along connecting road 2442 via the Friitalan silta (lit. 'Friitala Bridge'). The first Friitalan silta was opened in 1952, when demand for crossing exceeded the capacity of the existing ferry services.

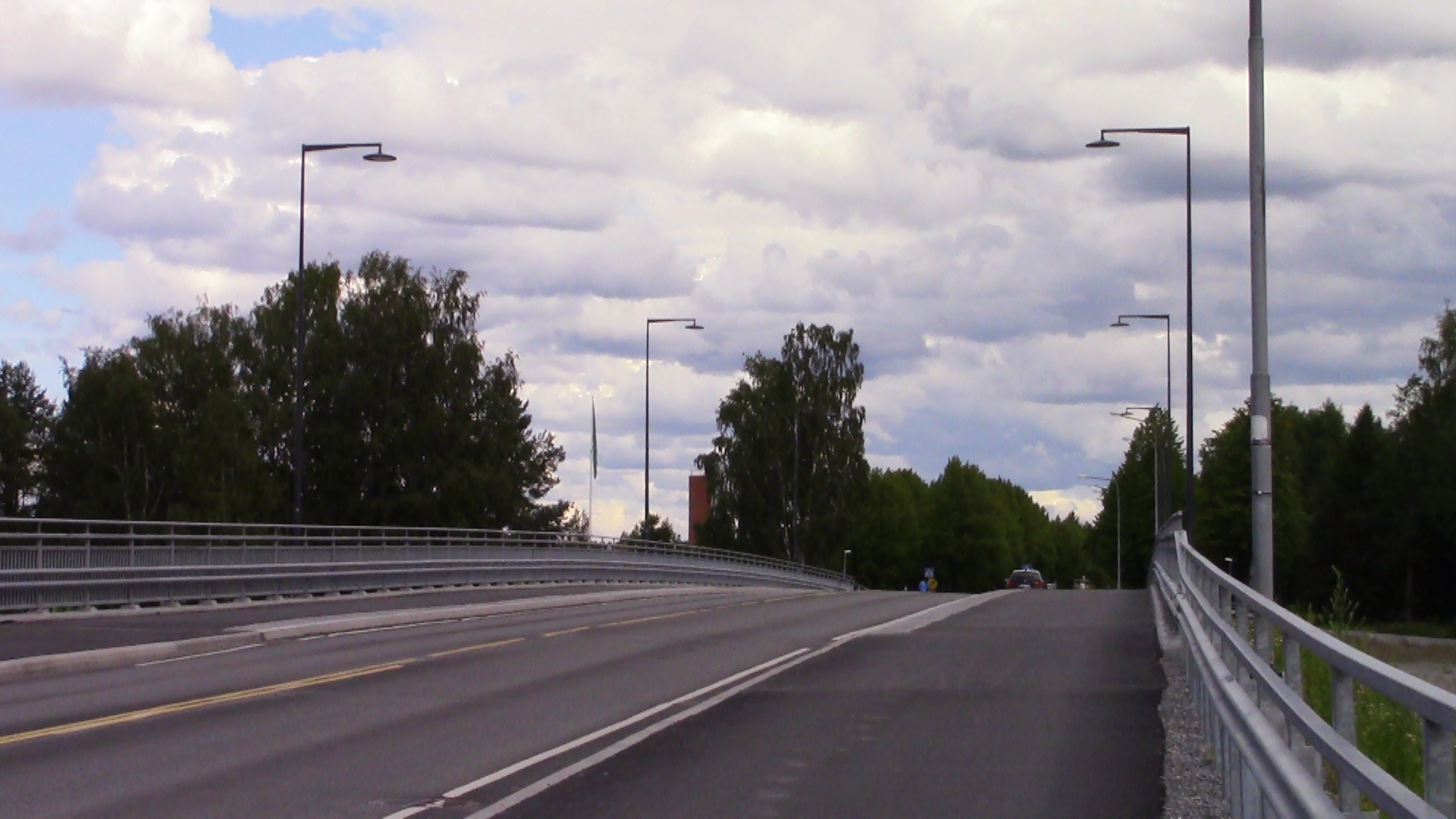
The new Friitalan silta in 2019

The original Friitalan silta was demolished in 2017 and a new Friitalan silta was completed in 2018. The bridge supports bidirectional traffic with a vehicle lane in either direction, features wide sidewalks on both sides, and sees an average of 8,300 auto crossings per day.

Connecting road 2442 meets connecting road 2440 in the core of Vanhakylä. Connecting road 2440 has different names to the north and south of its junction with connecting road 2442. To the north, connecting road 2440 is called the Kirkkotie (lit. 'Church road') because it directly passes the Ulvila Church.

The area along the Kitkkotie, north of the core of Vanhakylä, which includes the Ulvila Church, is called the Ulvilan kirkonseutu (lit. 'church area of Ulvila'). The area is generally sparsely populated but includes the Mynsteri residential area where, among other things, the home pitch of the football club FC Ulvila is located.

== Location ==
Vanhakylä is surrounded by countryside to the north, east, and south, with the Kokemäenjoki defining its western edge and separating the district from the Friitala district of Ulvila to the west and the Harmaalinna district of Pori to the north-west. The closest neighboring settlements on the northern bank of the Kokemaenjoki are villages and hamlets within the Ulvila municipality that lie to the north, south, and east of Vanhakylä, separated from Vanhakylä's residential areas by fields and forests.

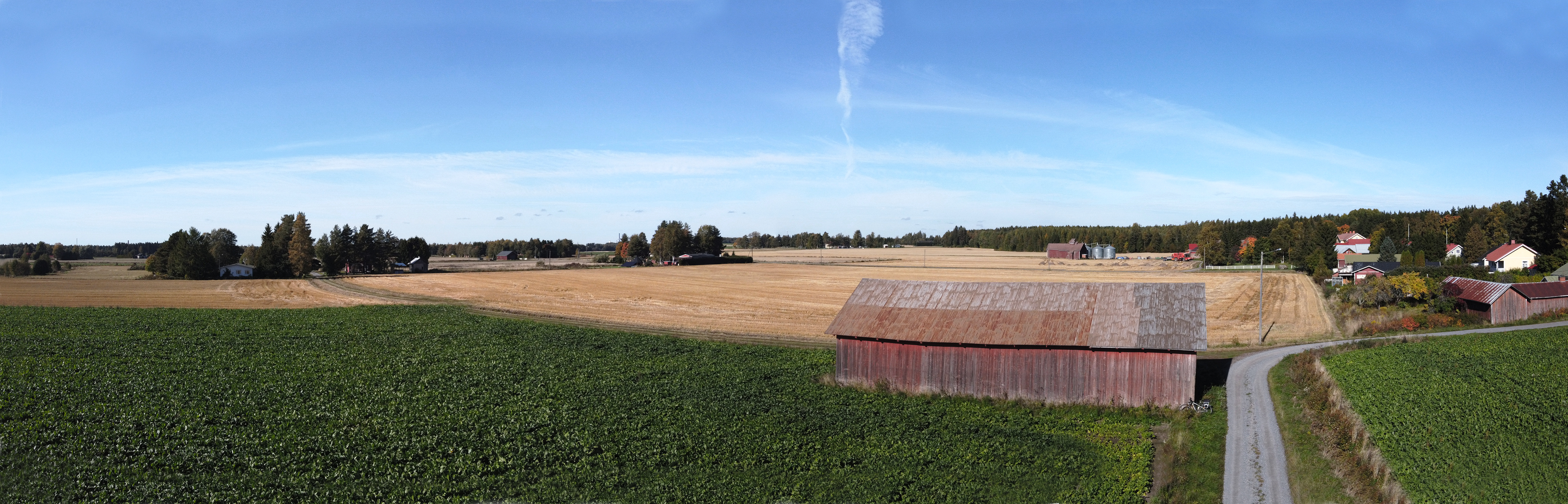
The hamlet of Suosmeri, the closest neighboring settlement north of the Ulvilan kirkonseutu

To the north is the village of Harjunpää, which has an approximate population of 1,500 and lies 8.1 kilometres (5.0 mi) from Vanhakylä's core. Traveling from Vanhakylä to Harjunpää is done via connecting road 2440, which becomes connecting road 2553 north of Mynsteri. Connecting road 2553 passes through the hamlets of Suosmeri (Swedish: Svartsmark) and Sunniemi (Swedish: Sonnäs), 4.6 km (2.9 mi) and 6.2 km (3.9 mi) north of Vanhakylä respectively.

About 1 kilometre (0.62 mi) to the south of Vanhakylä's core is the village of Ravani (Swedish: Ragvaldsby); the portion of connecting road 2440 running south of connecting road 2442 towards Ravani is called the Ravanintie (lit. 'Ravani road').

To the east is the village of Kaasmarkku (Swedish: Karlsmark), which had a population of 585 in 2015 and lies about 8 kilometres (5.0 mi) from the centre of Vanhakylä along the Kaasmarkuntie (lit. 'Kaasmarku road').

=== Saarenluoto ===
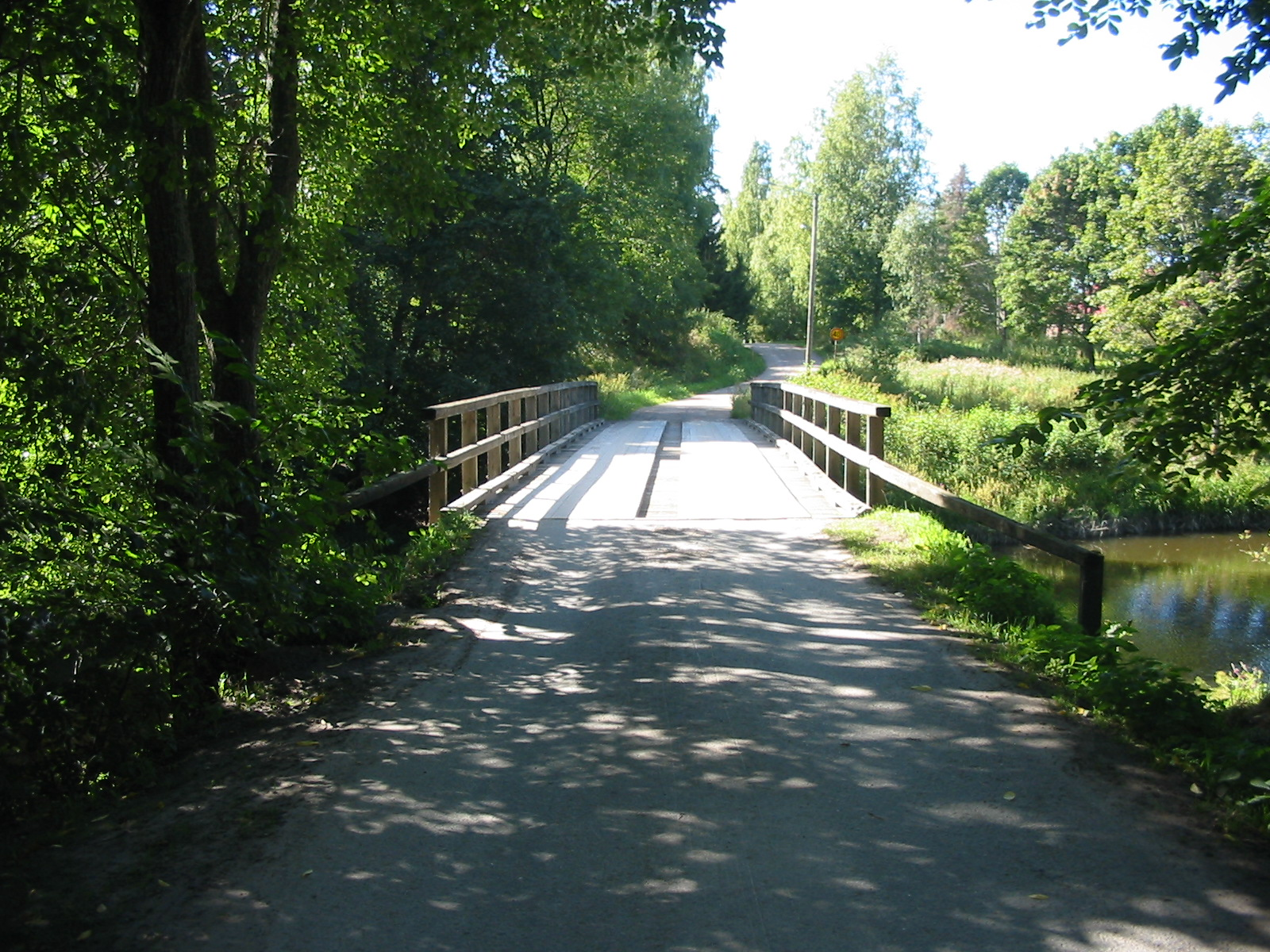
The bridge to Saarenluoto over the Kirkkojuopa at the Ulvila Church

To the north-west of the core of Vanhakylä and west of the Ulvilan kirkonseutu is Saarenluoto (lit. 'Saari islet'; Swedish: Mullholmen), an approximately three-kilometre (1.9 mi) long island formed by the Kokemäenjoki and one of its minor branches, the Kirkkojuopa. There are three bridges across the Kirkkojuopa between Saarenluoto and Vanhakylä:

- a wooden bridge connects the Ulvila Church to the Saari manor
- Eeron silta ('Eero's bridge'), a wooden suspension bridge for foot traffic that connects Mynsteri to the nature trails of Ulvila's outdoor municipal recreation area on Saarenluoto
- a bridge along Highway 11, which runs just north of Mynsteri and also links Saarenluoto to Pori across the Kokemäenjoki

== Historical sites ==
The Ulvila Church and surroundings, which include the vicar's parsonage Gammelgård, the Isokartano manor and Saari manor, the Trumetari estate, and the Liikistö historical area, were designated a Cultural Heritage Site of National Significance by the Finnish Heritage Agency in 2009.

== Gallery ==
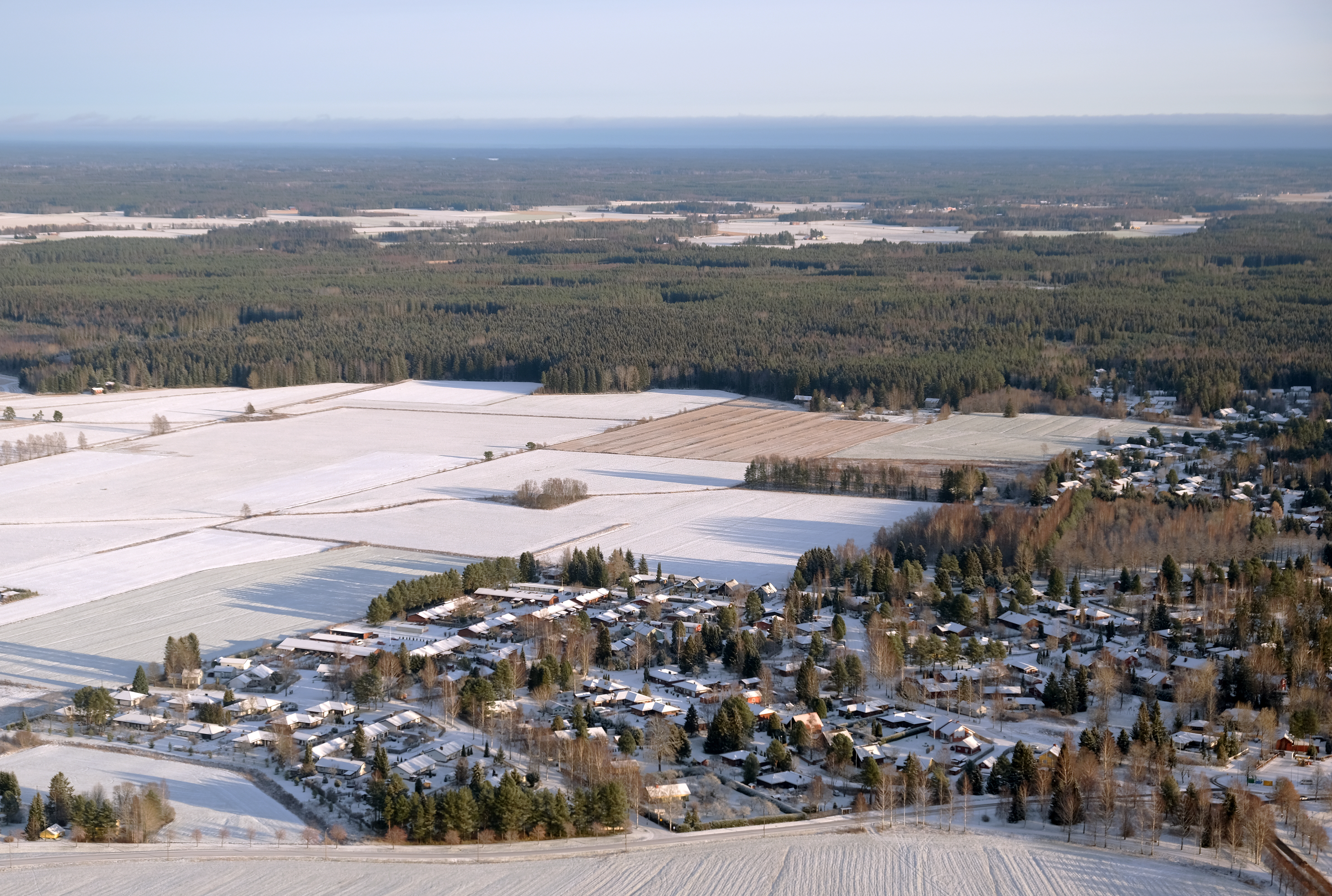
Aerial view of the Mukulamäki area, the northern part of Vanhakylä's core

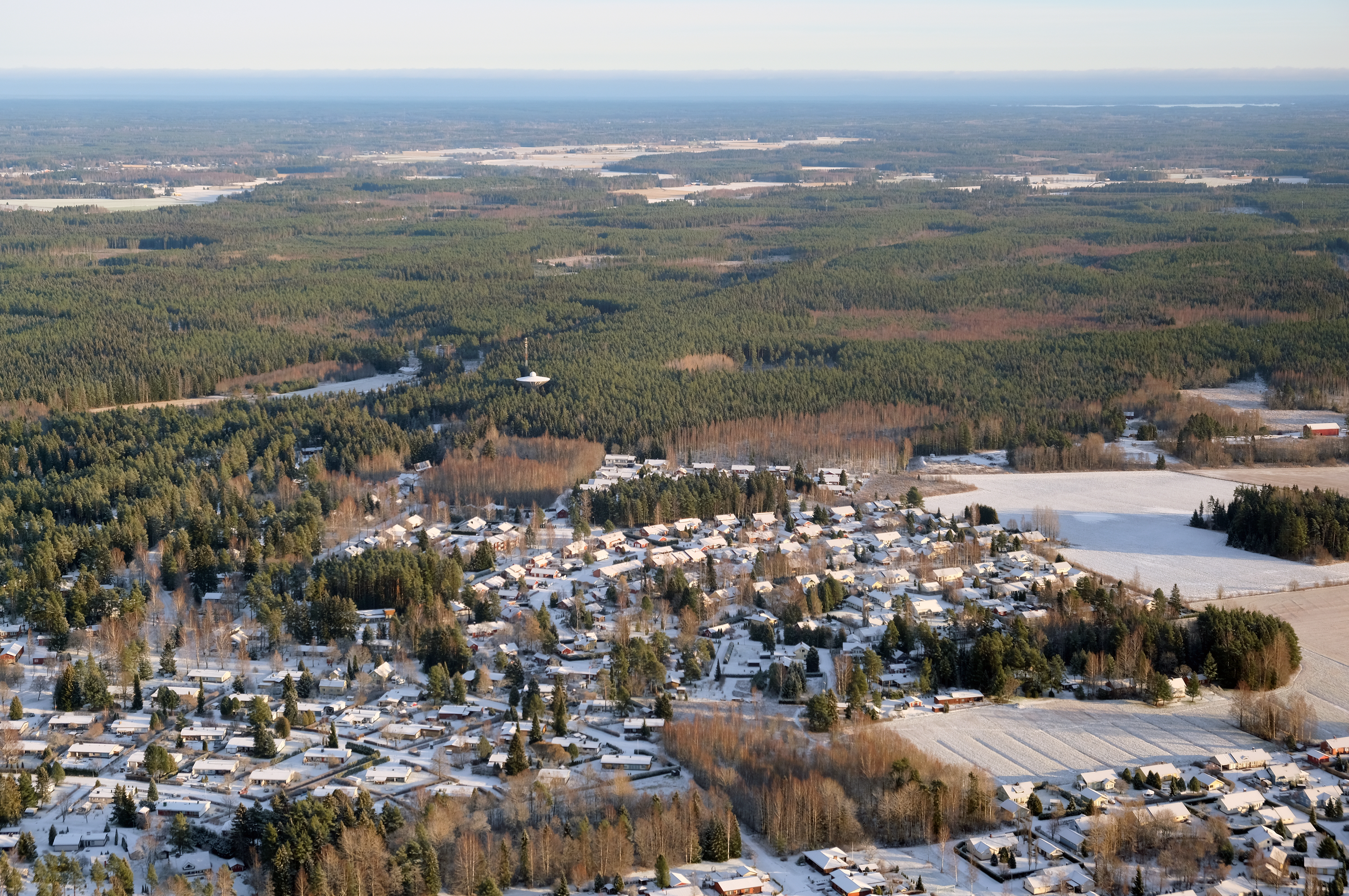
Aerial view of the Palonpää area, the southeastern part of Vanhakylä's core

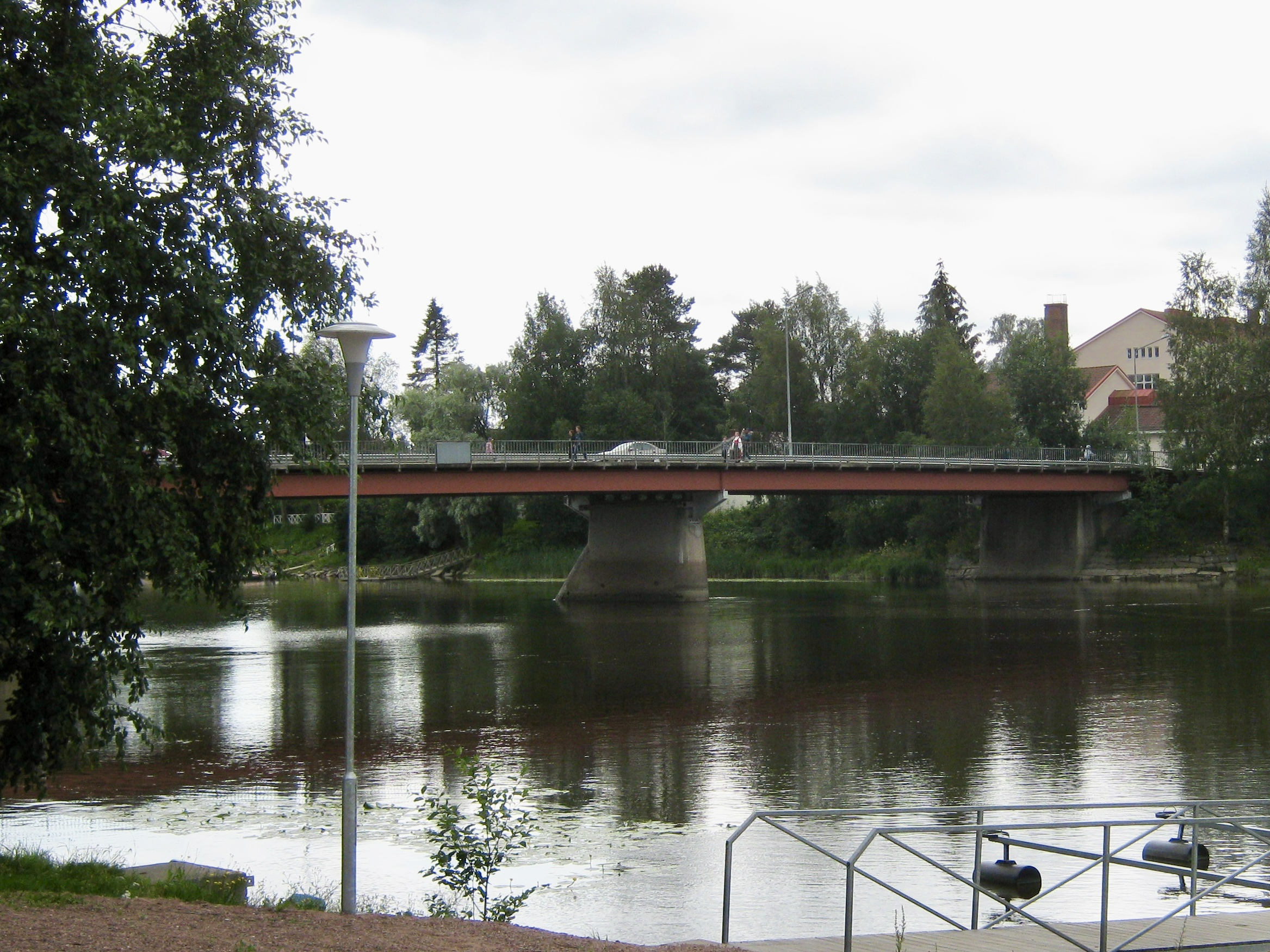
The old Friitalan silta over the Kokemäenjoki in 2012, looking across the river at Friitala from Vanhakylä.

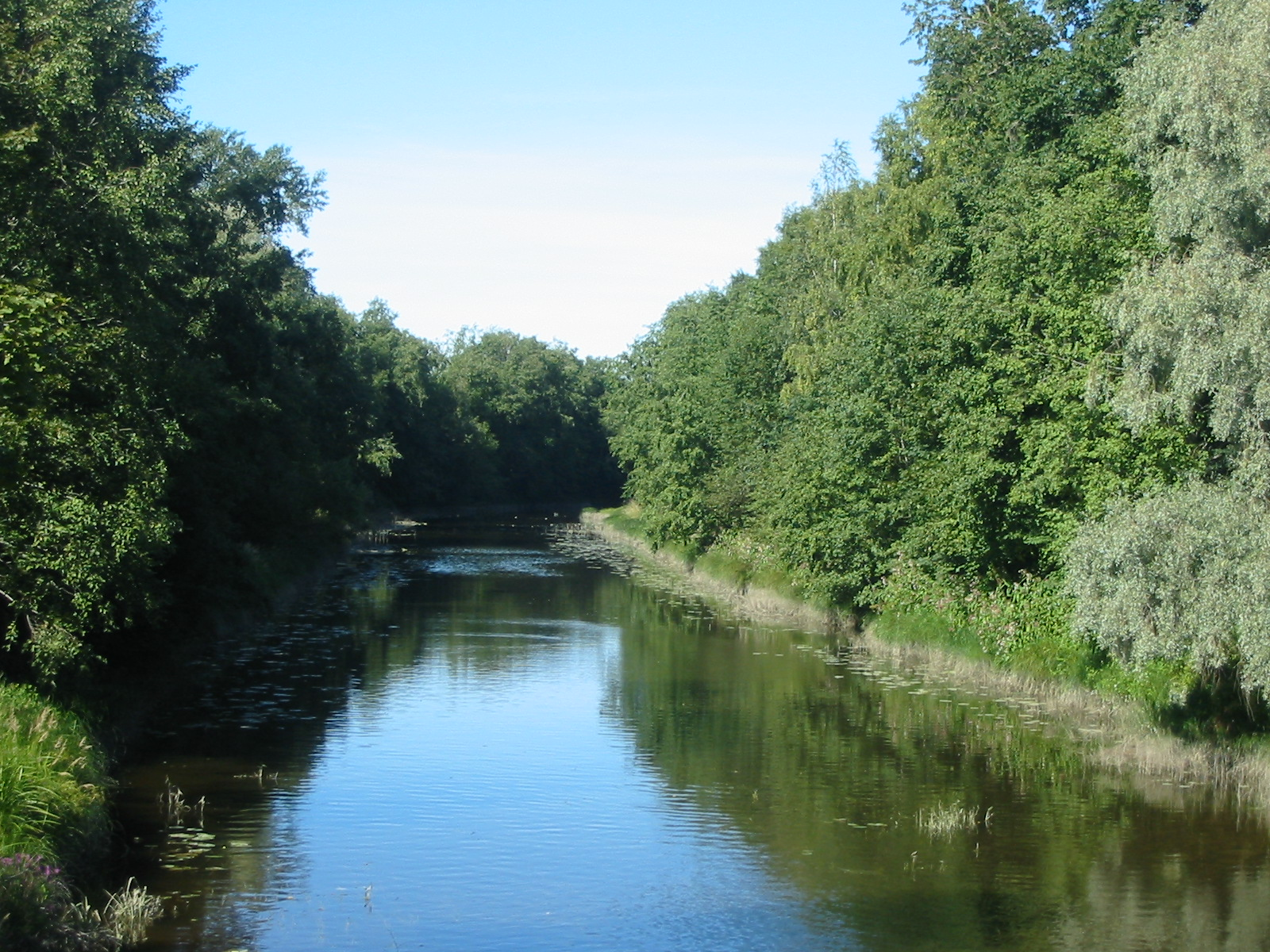
The Kirkkojuopaa with Saarenluoto on the right

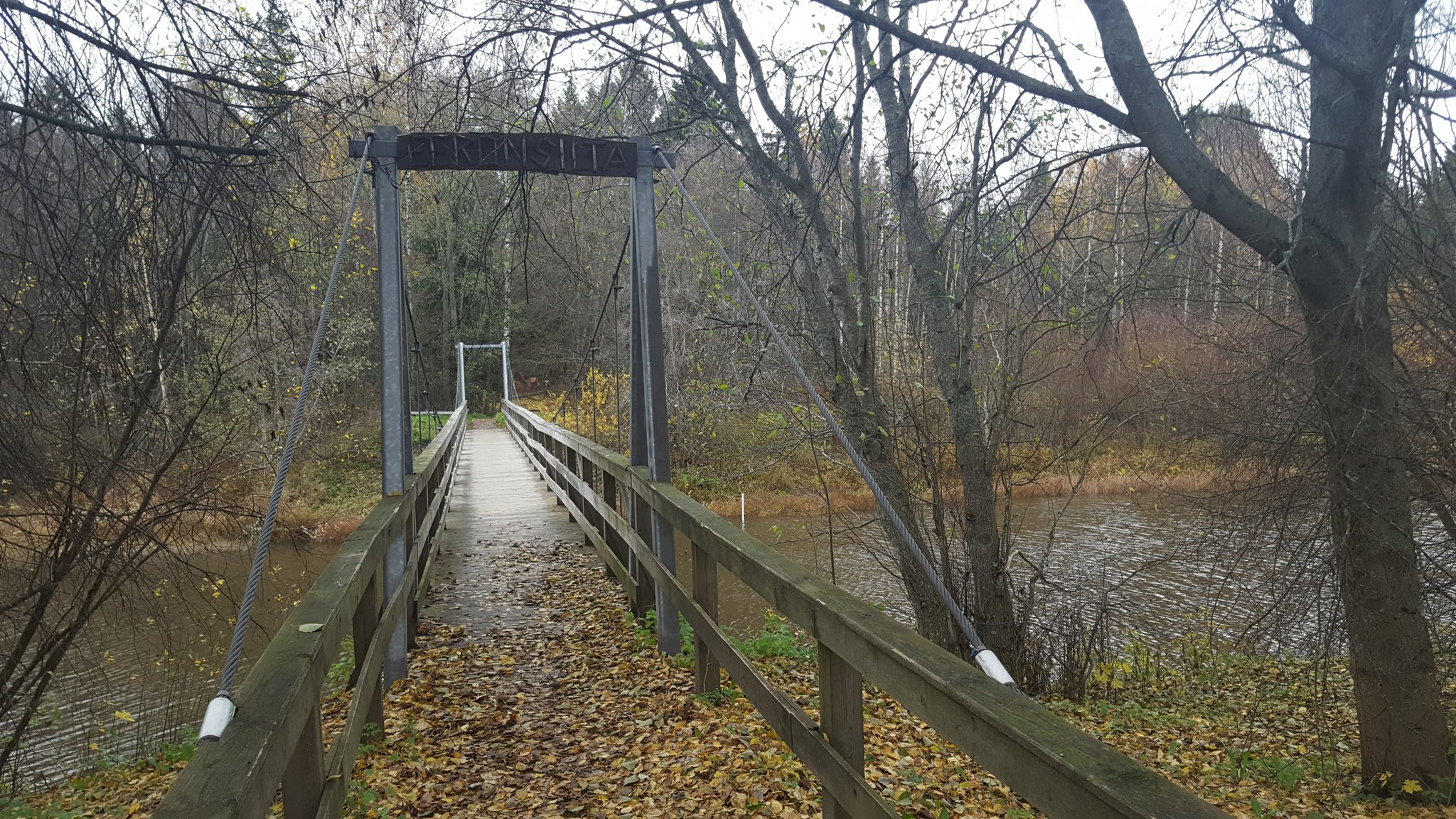
Eeron silta ('Eero's bridge') connecting Mynsteri to the nature trails on Saarenluoto

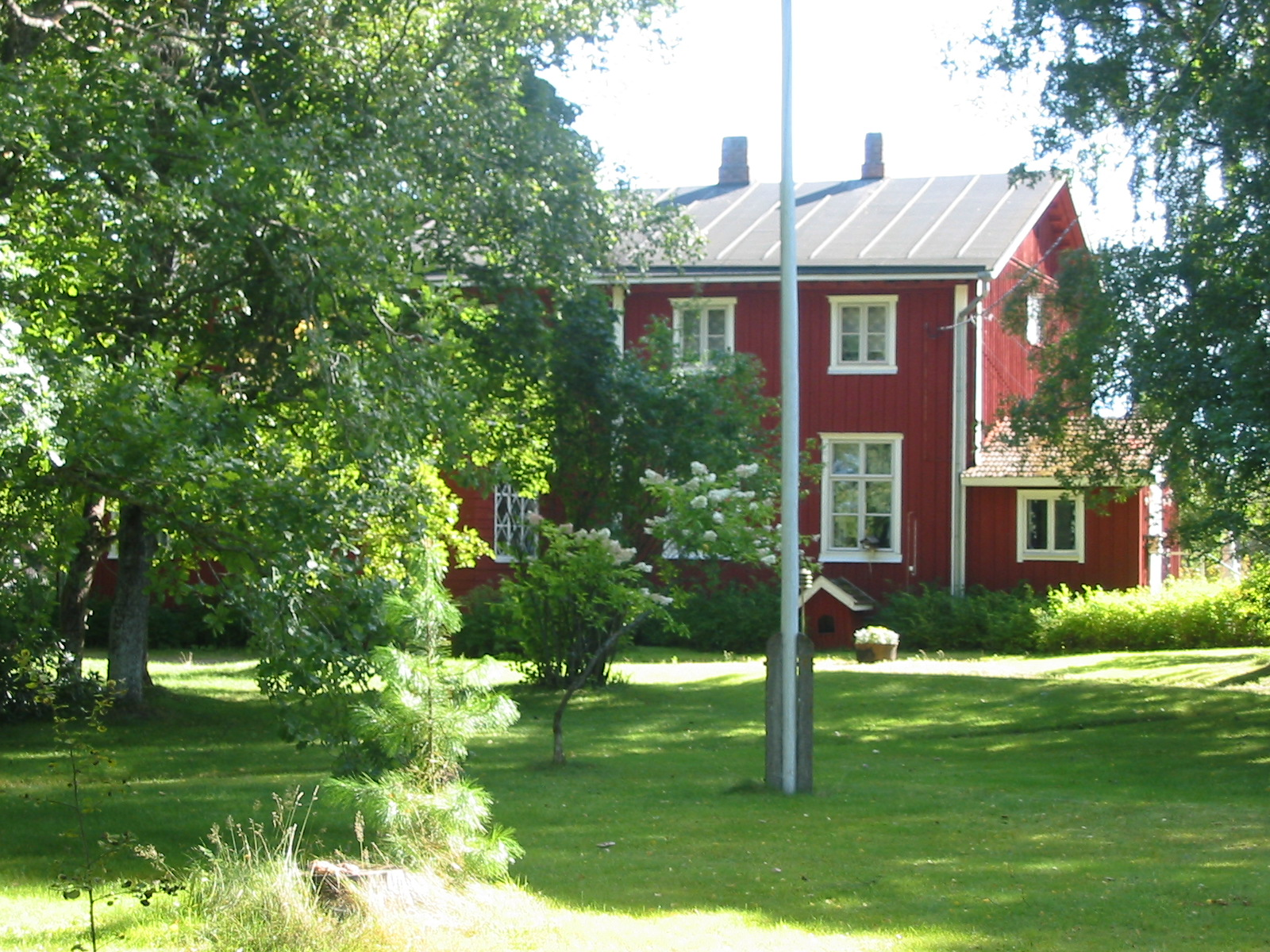
Saaren kartano ('Saari manor') on Saarenluoto

== Bibliography ==
- Avellan, Niilo J. (1928). "Entisen Ulvilan pitäjän maatilat II: Vanhakylä". Satakunta - Kotiseutututkimuksia III (in Finnish) (2nd ed.). Satakuntalainen osakunta. pp. 115–121.
- Hiekkanen, Markus (1994). The Stone Churches of the Medieval Diocese of Turku: A Systematic Classification and Chronology (Doctoral dissertation). Translated by Kokkonen, Jüri. Helsinki: Suomen Muinaismuistoyhdistys [Finnish Antiquarian Society]. ISBN 9789519057118.
- Hiekkanen, Markus (2000). "Ulvilan kirkon ikä". SARKA – Satakunnan Museon Vuosikirja 2000 (in Finnish). Pori: Satakunnan Museo. ISSN 1238-9668.
- Hiekkanen, Markus (2001). Satakunnan keskiaikaiset kivikirkot (in Finnish). Vammala: Kotiseutututkimuksia XIX. pp. 194–212.
- Hiekkanen, Markus (2003). Suomen keskiajan kivikirkot (in Finnish) (1st ed.). Helsinki: Kustannusosakeyhtiö Otava.
- Hiekkanen, Markus (2014). Suomen keskiajan kivikirkot (in Finnish) (3rd ed.). Helsinki: Suomalaisen Kirjallisuuden Seura. ISBN 9789522226006.
- Hirsjärvi, Tarmo (1932). Ulvilan seurakunta (in Finnish). Forssa: Ulvilan seurakunta.
- Lehtinen, Erkki; Kopisto, Aarne; Virkkala, Kalevi (1967). Suur-Ulvilan historia I (PDF) (in Finnish). Pori: Porin maalaiskunnan, Ulvilan, Kullaan ja Nakkilan kunnat.
- Suvanto, Seppo (1973). Satakunnan historia III: keskiaika (in Finnish). Pori: Satakunnan maakuntaliitto. ISBN 951950950X.
- Tulkki, Carita (2006). Ulvilan kirkko ja tapuli: Ulvilan kirkon ja tapulin restaurointi- ja korjaustyön arkeologinen valvonta 2004–2005 (in Finnish). Pori: Satakunnan Museo. Archived from the original on 24 September 2021.
