= Kuusisto Castle =

- Kuusiston piispanlinna Kustö biskopsborg
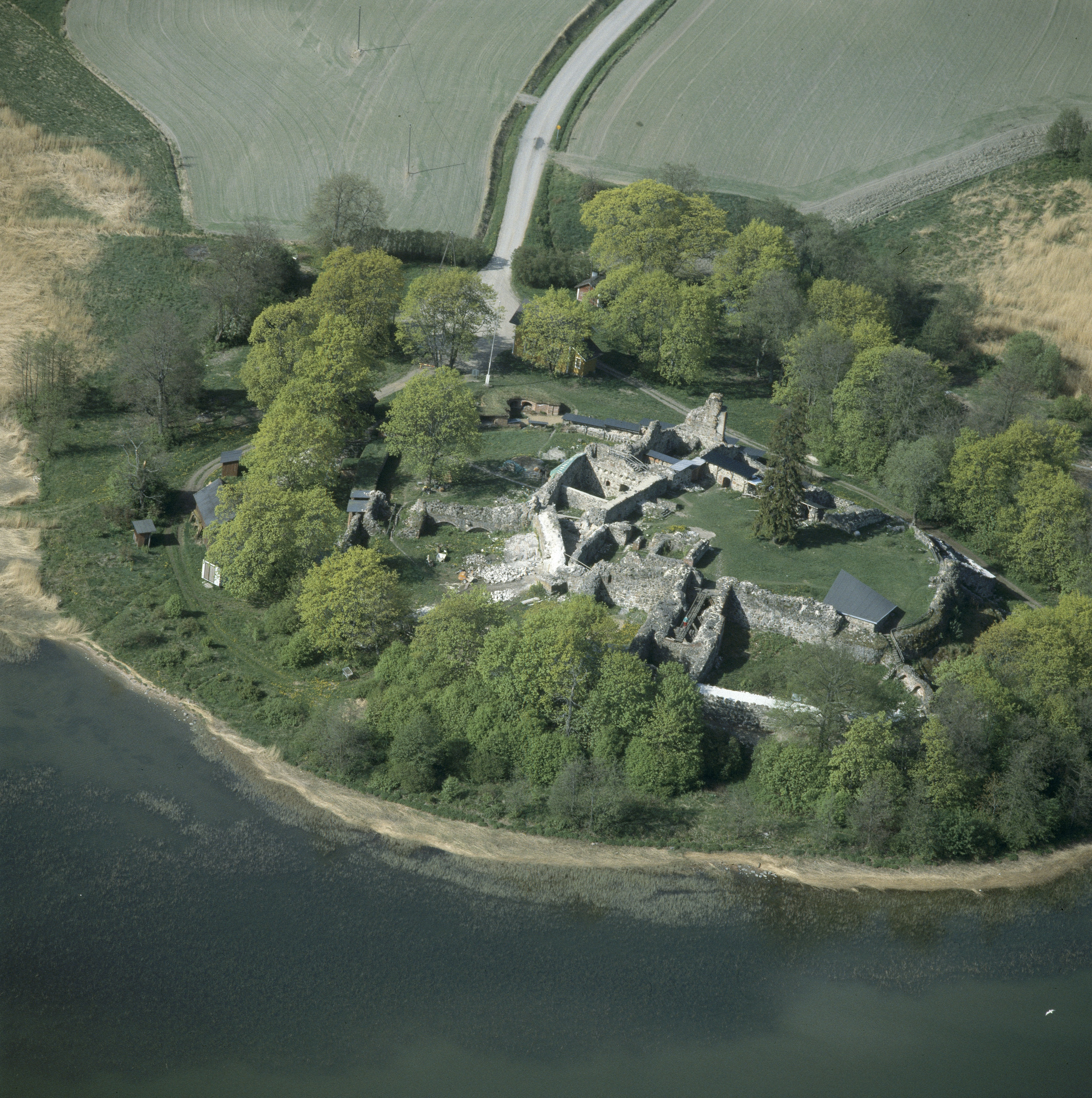
- Kuusisto Castle ruins seen from above.
- Interactive map of the Kuusisto Castle area

General information
- Type: Medieval castle
- Location: Kaarina, Finland, Linnanrauniontie 633; FI-21620 Kaarina; Finland
- Coordinates: 60°24′28″N 22°28′29″E

Kuusisto Castle (Finnish: Kuusiston piispanlinna, Swedish: Kustö biskopsborg) was a medieval episcopal castle on the island of Kuusisto in Kaarina, Finland, near Turku. The castle was probably built in the early 14th century, although the site seems to have been a bishop's residence by the 1290s.

The castle was ordered to be demolished during the Protestant Reformation in 1528 by the king Gustav I of Sweden. Excavation and reconstruction work on the remaining ruins began in 1891.

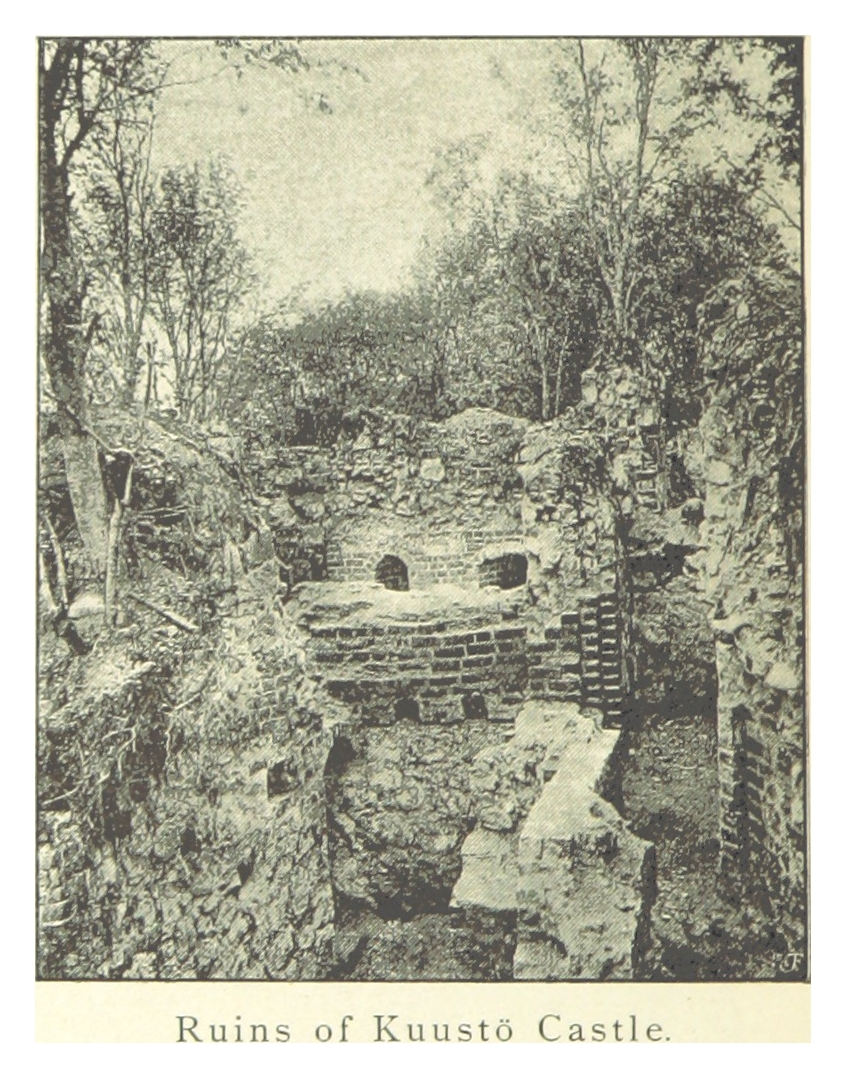
Structures of Kuusisto Castle during the excavation in 1894

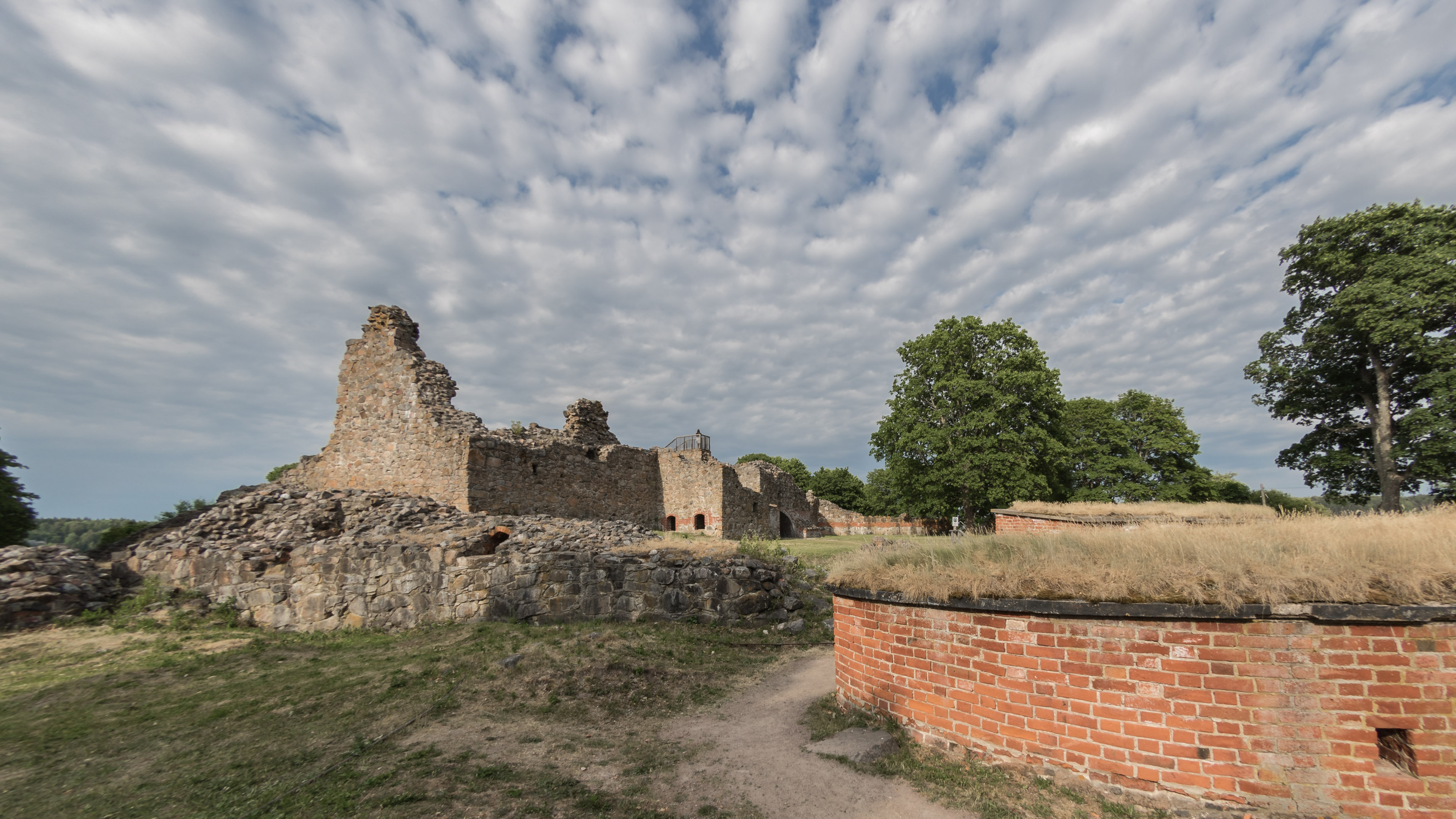
Kuusisto Castle ruins today

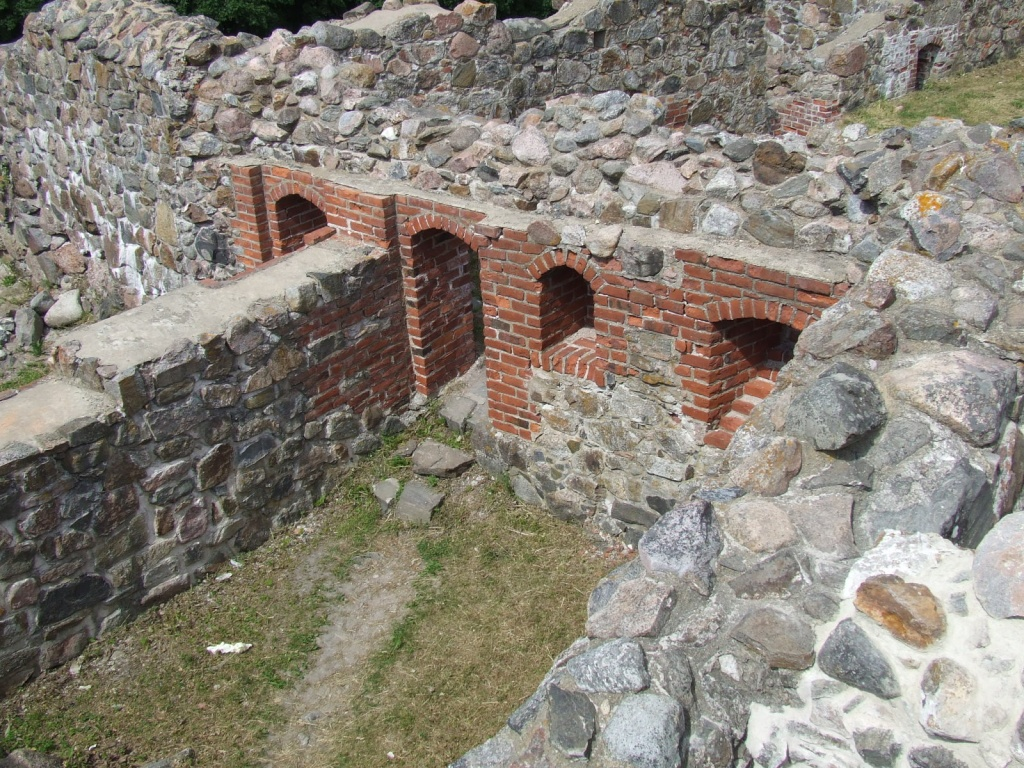
A room in ruins

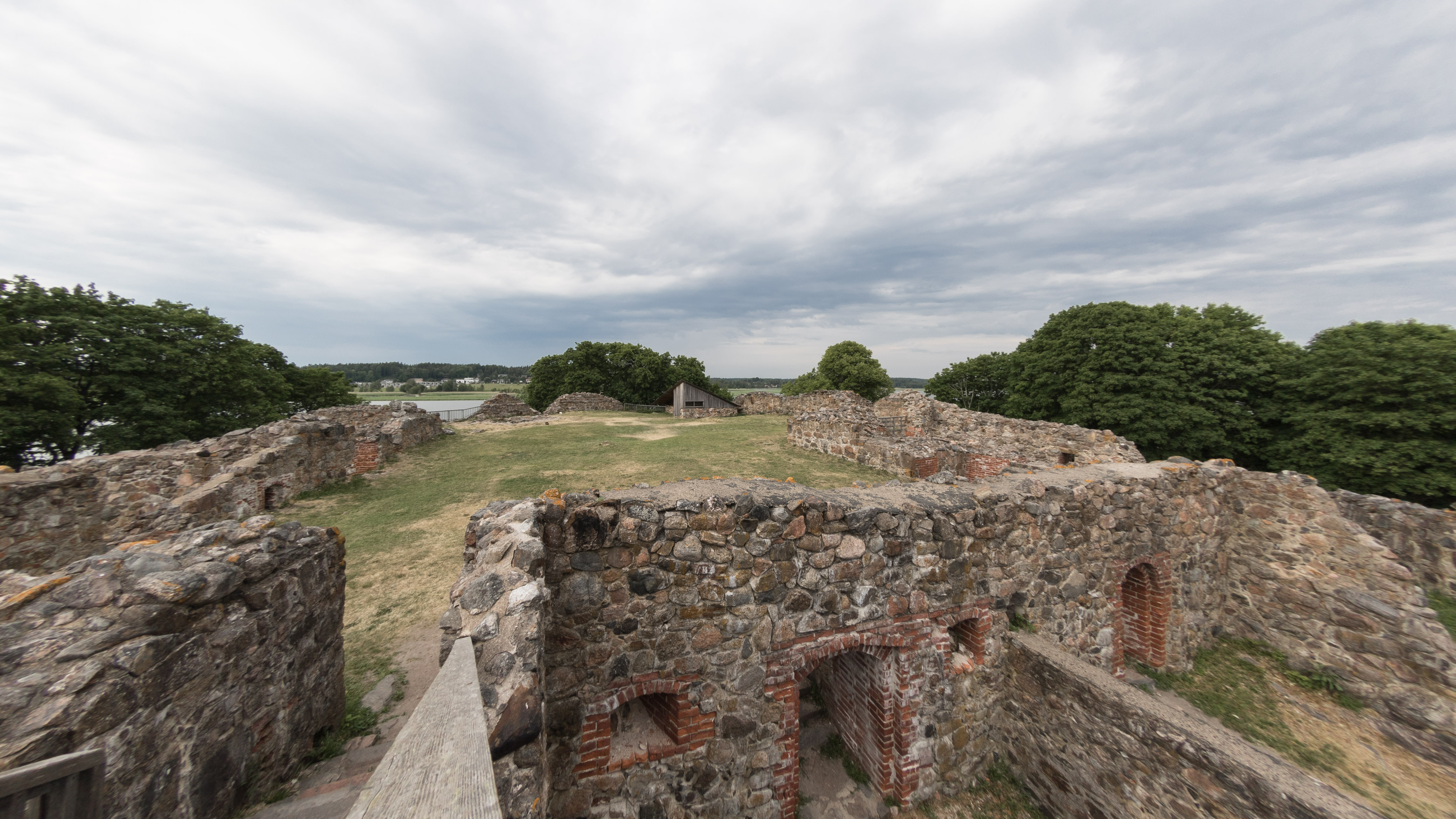
View over the inner yard

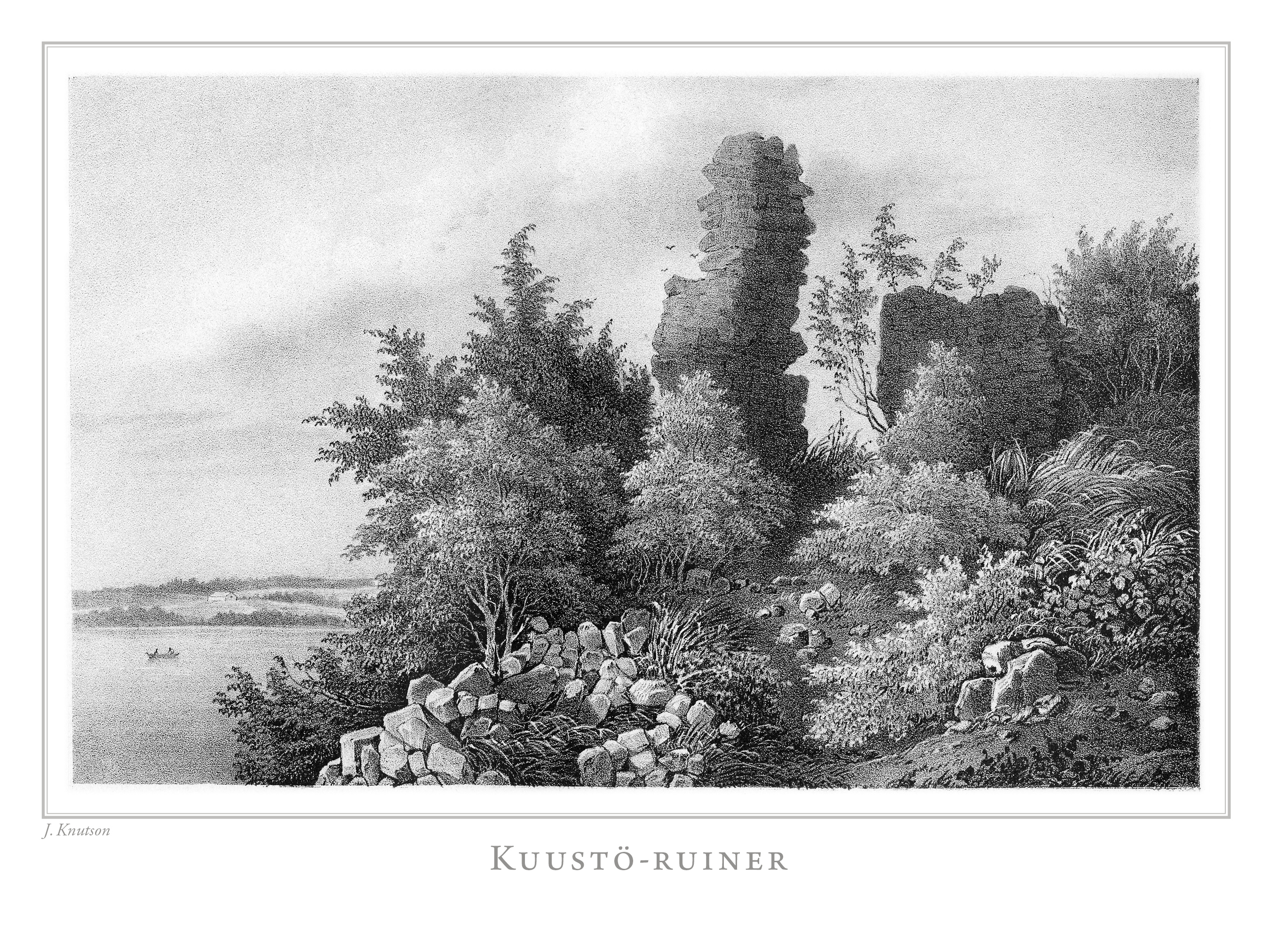
Illustration in Finland framstäldt i teckningar edited by Zacharias Topelius and published 1845-1852.
