= Kuusisto (island) =

Island and former municipality in the country of Finland

- Former municipality
- Kuusiston kunta Kustö kommun
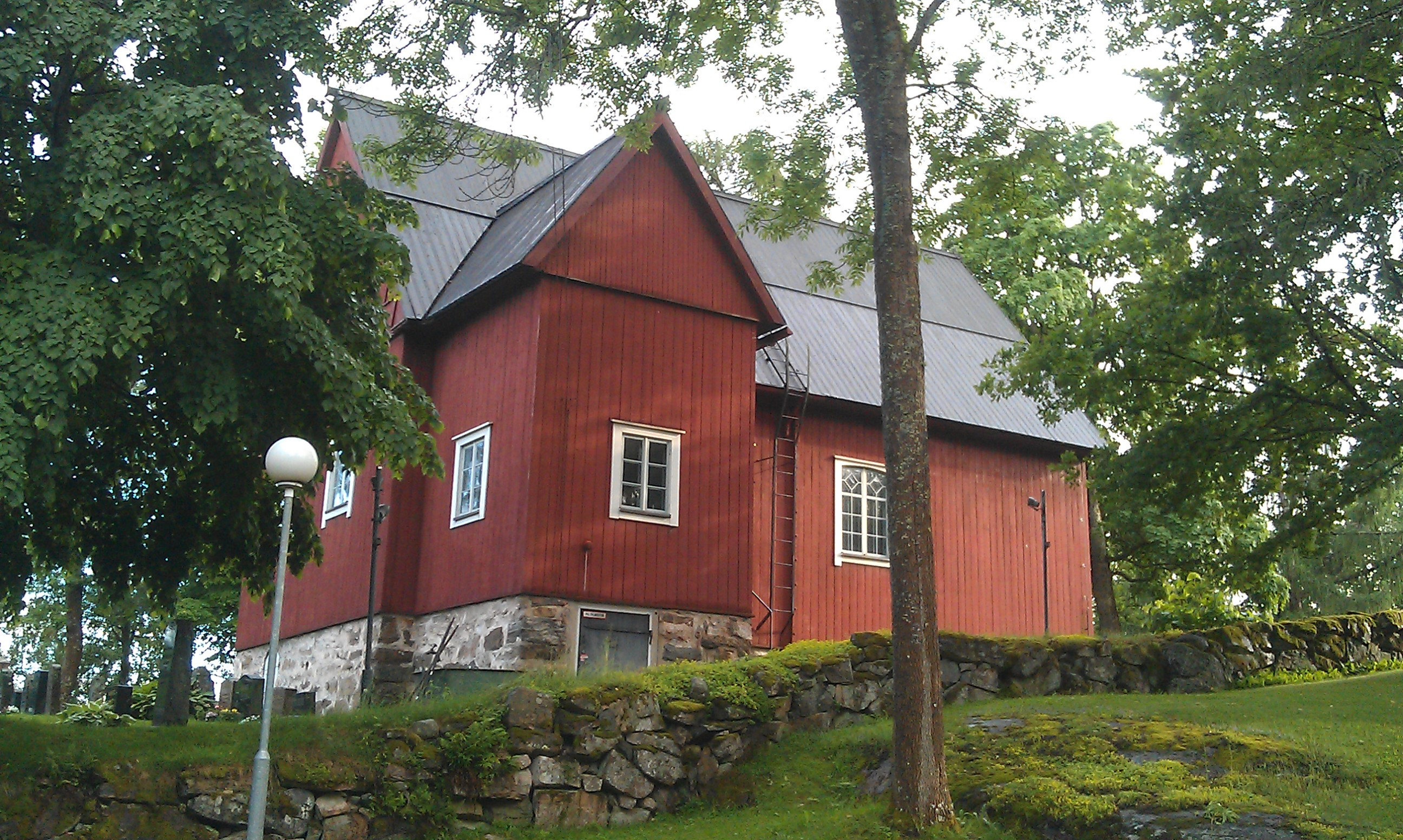
- The Kuusisto Church and cemetery on Kuusisto island.

- Location of Kuusisto within Turku and Pori Province in Finland (1935).
- Interactive map of Kuusisto
- Location within Southwest Finland Location within Finland Location within Europe
- Coordinates: 60.387398°N 22.400322°E
- Country: Finland
- Province: Turku and Pori Province
- Region: Finland Proper
- Established: 1914
- Merged into Kaarina: 1946

Area
  - Land: 20.4 km^{2} (7.9 sq mi)

Population (1944-12-31)
  - Total: 543

Kuusisto (Finnish: Kuusisto; Swedish: Kustö) is an island and former municipality in Kaarina, Finland. The island is about 12 km long and 2 km wide. Its main attraction is Kuusisto Castle.

== Villages ==
Villages within Kuusisto:

- Empo (Ämboda)
- Finby, Isokylä (Storby)
- Joensuu (Åminne)
- Jullas, Järvenkylä (Träskby)
- Kalliola (Krogsby)
- Kerromi (Kärrom)
- Korsnainen (Korsnäs)
- Kylliäinen
- Munkke (Munkäng)
- Rävnäs (Räfnäs)
- Vuolahti

== History ==
Kuusisto was first mentioned in 1295. The construction of the bishop's castle began in 1316. The island was a part of the Piikkiö parish. After the Reformation, the bishop's castle was demolished. Some of its remains were used as materials for the Piikkiö church in 1755. Kuusisto gained chapel rights in 1653, eventually becoming a separate municipality and parish in 1914. It was consolidated with Kaarina in 1946.

As the municipality was disestablished before rural municipalities were allowed to use coats of arms, Kuusisto never had an official coat of arms. The heraldist Tapani Talari has designed an unofficial coat of arms for use by the Suomen Kuntaliitto ry.

== Gallery ==
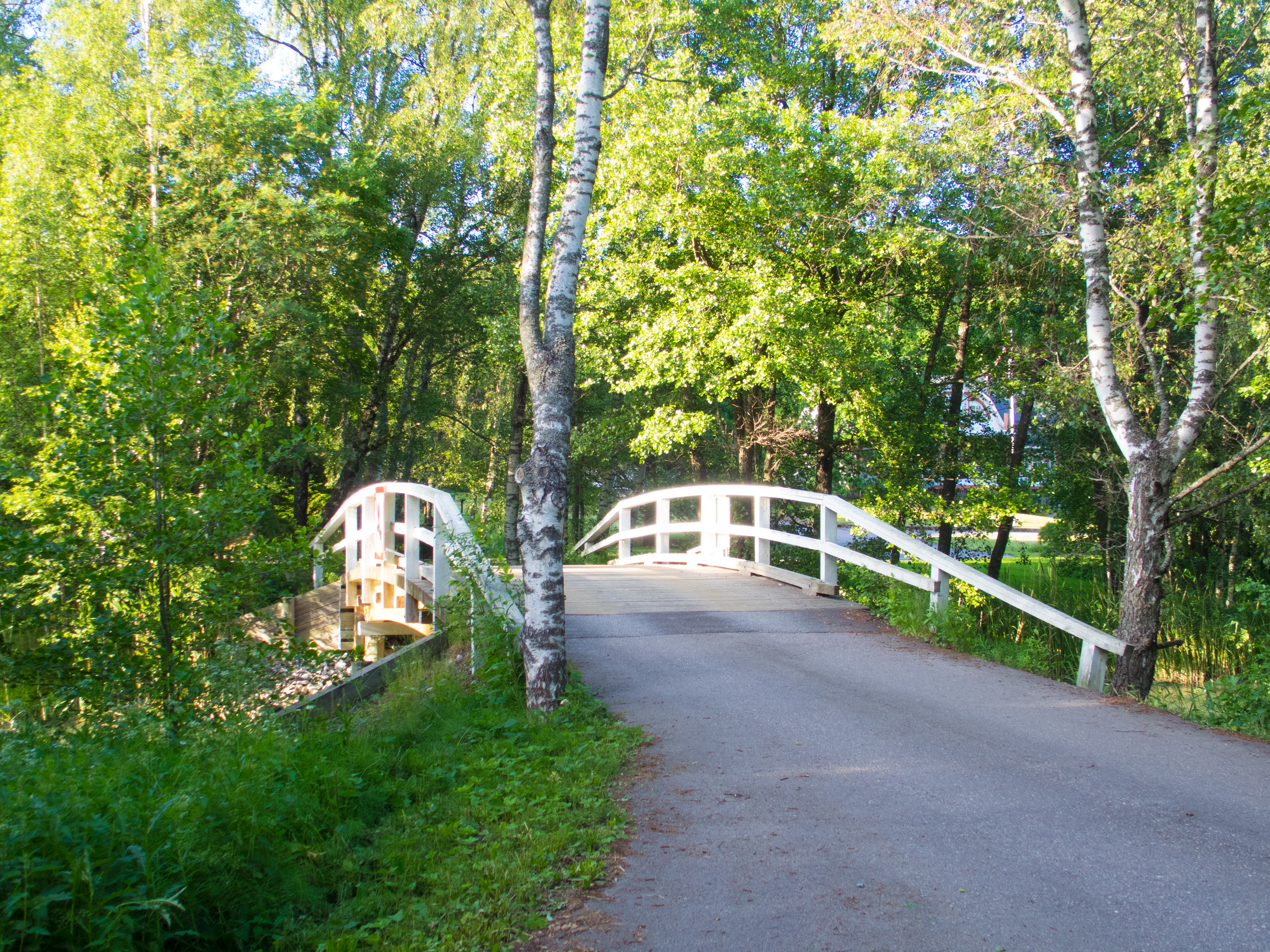
Bridge to Rövarholmen island in the southwest of Kuusisto Island

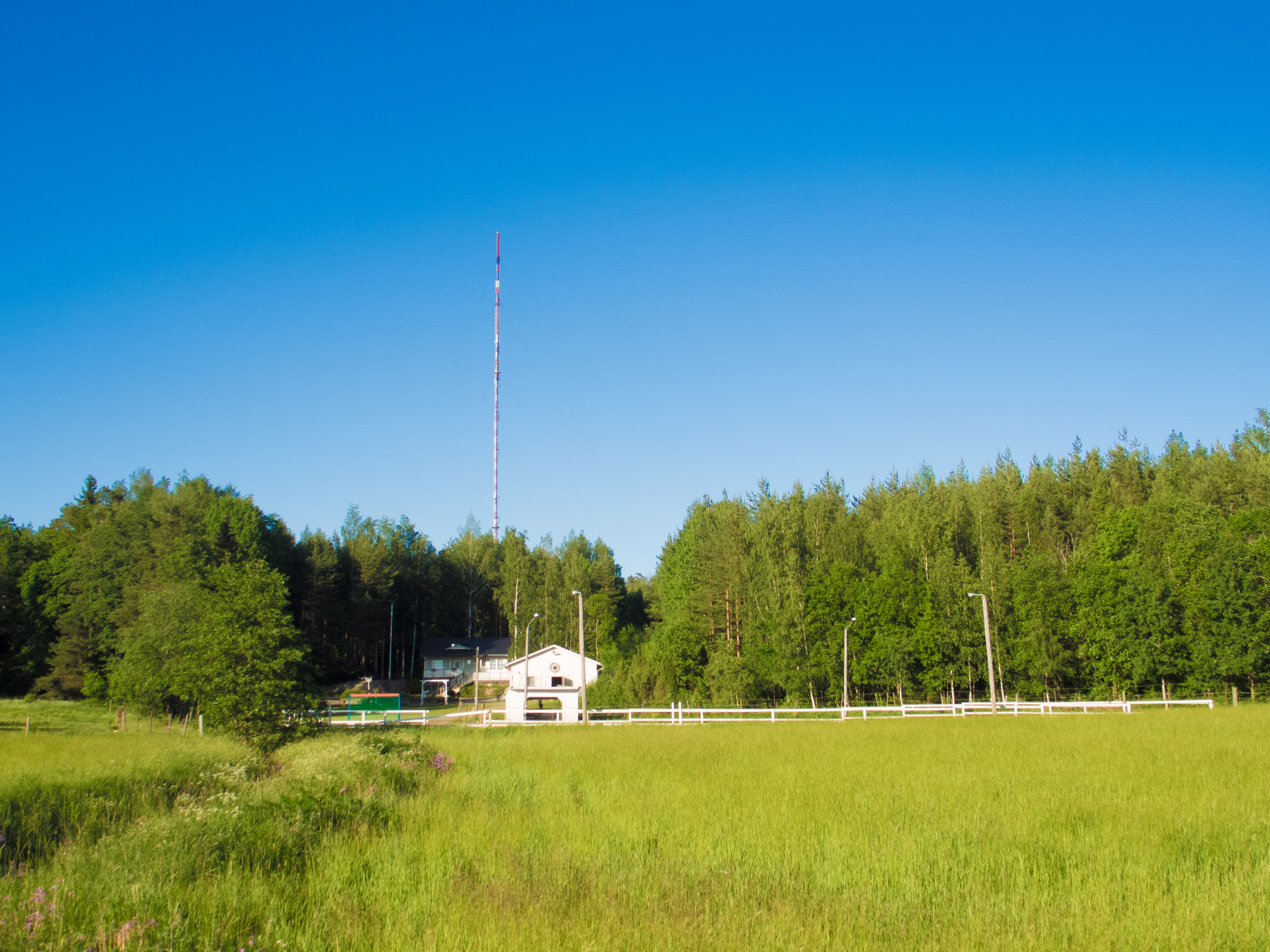
Yle broadcasting tower run by Digita Oy in the southwest of Kuusisto Island.
