= Kaarina =

Kaarina S:t Karins
- Town
- Kaarinan kaupunki S:t Karins stad
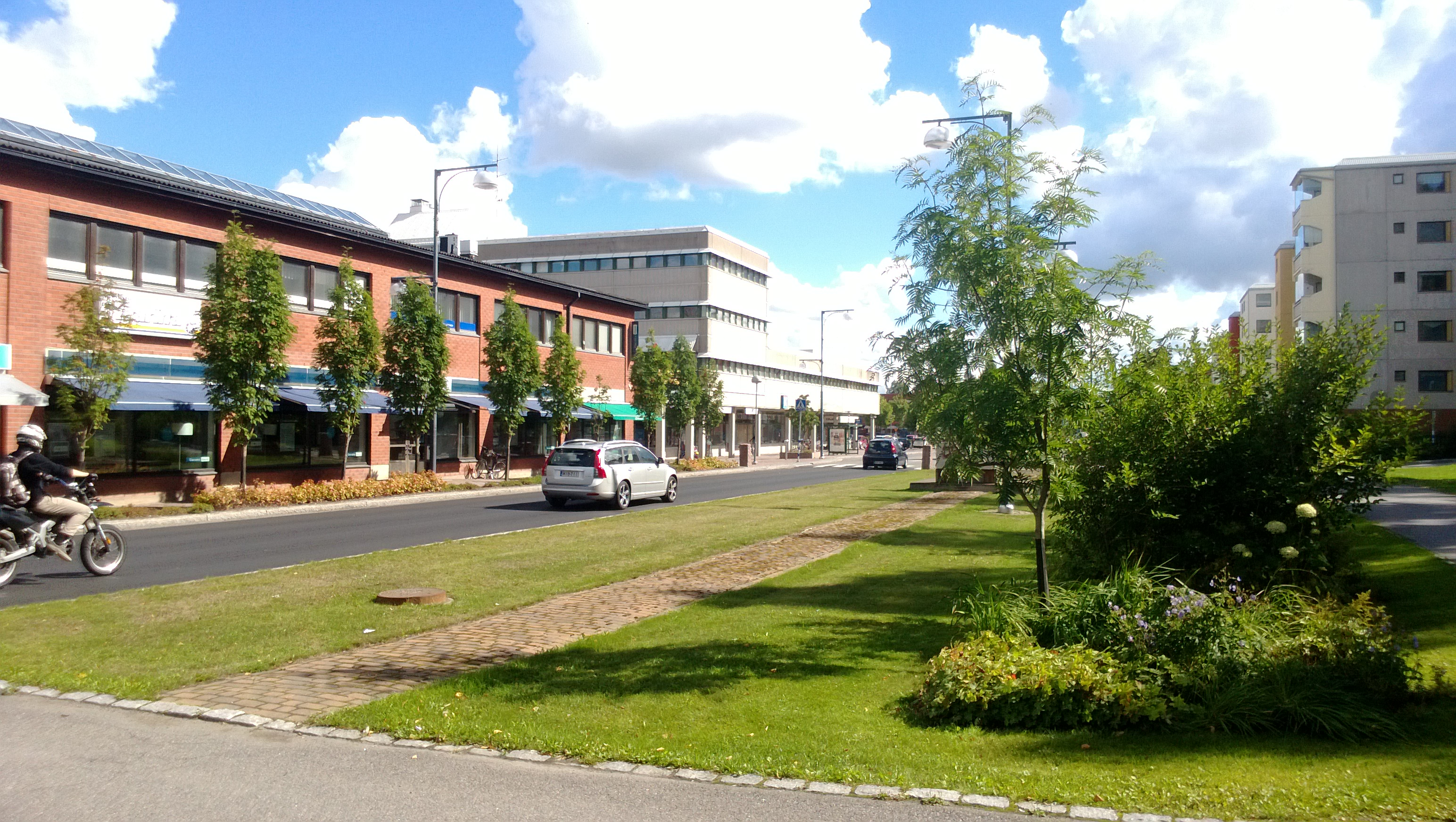

- Coat of arms

- Location of Kaarina in Finland
- Interactive map of Kaarina
- Coordinates: 60°24′N 022°22′E
- Country: Finland
- Region: Southwest Finland
- Sub-region: Turku sub-region
- Metropolitan area: Turku metropolitan area
- Charter: 1869

Government
  - Town manager: Harri Virta

Area (2018-01-01)
  - Total: 179.58 km^{2} (69.34 sq mi)
  - Land: 150.57 km^{2} (58.14 sq mi)
  - Water: 29.15 km^{2} (11.25 sq mi)
  - Rank: 276th largest in Finland

Population (2025-12-31)
  - Total: 36,675
  - Rank: 31st largest in Finland
  - Density: 243.57/km^{2} (630.8/sq mi)

Population by native language
  - Finnish: 88% (official)
  - Swedish: 5.1%
  - Others: 6.9%

Population by age
  - 0 to 14: 18.5%
  - 15 to 64: 60.3%
  - 65 or older: 21.2%
- Time zone: UTC+02:00 (EET)
  - Summer (DST): UTC+03:00 (EEST)
- Climate: Dfb
- Website: kaarina.fi

Kaarina (Finnish pronunciation: [ˈkɑːrinɑ]; Swedish: S:t Karins, i.e. "Saint Catherine's") is a town in Finland, located in the region of Southwest Finland. It lies south of the regional capital, Turku. The population of Kaarina is approximately 37,000, while the sub-region has a population of approximately 356,000. It is the 31st most populous municipality in Finland, and the second largest municipality in the Southwest Finland region after Turku.

Kaarina has an area of 179.58 square kilometres (69.34 sq mi) of which 29.15 km^{2} (11.25 sq mi) is water. The population density is 243.57 inhabitants per square kilometre (630.8/sq mi).

The municipality is unilingual Finnish, with a Swedish minority and a Swedish comprehensive school. Bilingualism was proposed but rejected in 2015.

The famous artist Tom of Finland was born in Kaarina. Kaarina has a football team called Kaarinan Pojat. The Kino Piispanristi is the largest independent cinema in Southwest Finland.

The municipality of Kuusisto was merged with Kaarina in 1946. The municipality of Piikkiö was merged with Kaarina in 2009. At the same time, Kaarina adopted Piikkiö's coat of arms.

== Climate ==
Climate data for Kaarina Yltöinen (1991-2020 normals, extremes 1959- present)
Month	Jan	Feb	Mar	Apr	May	Jun	Jul	Aug	Sep	Oct	Nov	Dec	Year
Record high °C (°F)	8.8 (47.8)	10.0 (50.0)	14.1 (57.4)	22.9 (73.2)	29.3 (84.7)	31.2 (88.2)	33.2 (91.8)	32.2 (90.0)	28.0 (82.4)	18.6 (65.5)	14.1 (57.4)	11.0 (51.8)	33.2 (91.8)
Mean maximum °C (°F)	4.9 (40.8)	4.9 (40.8)	9.2 (48.6)	17.0 (62.6)	24.4 (75.9)	26.1 (79.0)	28.3 (82.9)	26.8 (80.2)	21.7 (71.1)	15.1 (59.2)	9.5 (49.1)	6.0 (42.8)	29.0 (84.2)
Mean daily maximum °C (°F)	−0.9 (30.4)	−1.1 (30.0)	2.8 (37.0)	8.9 (48.0)	15.4 (59.7)	19.6 (67.3)	22.5 (72.5)	21.3 (70.3)	16.1 (61.0)	9.3 (48.7)	4.1 (39.4)	1.1 (34.0)	9.9 (49.8)
Daily mean °C (°F)	−3.6 (25.5)	−4.3 (24.3)	−1.3 (29.7)	4.0 (39.2)	10.0 (50.0)	14.5 (58.1)	17.5 (63.5)	16.2 (61.2)	11.5 (52.7)	6.0 (42.8)	1.9 (35.4)	−1.3 (29.7)	5.9 (42.6)
Mean daily minimum °C (°F)	−6.9 (19.6)	−7.9 (17.8)	−5.2 (22.6)	−0.5 (31.1)	4.3 (39.7)	9.1 (48.4)	12.2 (54.0)	11.2 (52.2)	7.2 (45.0)	2.8 (37.0)	−0.7 (30.7)	−4.1 (24.6)	1.8 (35.2)
Mean minimum °C (°F)	−20.8 (−5.4)	−20.4 (−4.7)	−16.3 (2.7)	−6.9 (19.6)	−3.0 (26.6)	2.2 (36.0)	6.3 (43.3)	4.3 (39.7)	−0.8 (30.6)	−5.8 (21.6)	−10.2 (13.6)	−15.4 (4.3)	−24.2 (−11.6)
Record low °C (°F)	−36.7 (−34.1)	−37.4 (−35.3)	−30.0 (−22.0)	−18.4 (−1.1)	−7.2 (19.0)	−2.5 (27.5)	2.0 (35.6)	−0.6 (30.9)	−8.0 (17.6)	−16.8 (1.8)	−23.5 (−10.3)	−35.8 (−32.4)	−37.4 (−35.3)
Average precipitation mm (inches)	54 (2.1)	41 (1.6)	37 (1.5)	32 (1.3)	35 (1.4)	57 (2.2)	71 (2.8)	78 (3.1)	56 (2.2)	74 (2.9)	67 (2.6)	68 (2.7)	671 (26.4)
Average precipitation days (≥ 0.1 mm)	19	15	13	11	10	12	13	14	13	16	18	20	174
Average relative humidity (%)	92	89	82	75	71	73	77	81	85	89	93	92	83
Source 1: https://helda.helsinki.fi/items/d7ce3a4f-bf47-4453-be76-2a0de738c59a
Source 2: https://kilotavu.com/asema-taulukko.php?asema=100934

== Demographics ==
=== Population ===
The city of Kaarina has 36,675 inhabitants, making it the 31st most populous municipality in Finland. The city of Kaarina is part of the Turku region, which is the third largest urban area in Finland with 355,791 inhabitants.

Population size 1990–2025
Year	Population
1990	24,390
1995	25,457
2000	26,746
2005	28,967
2010	30,911
2015	32,590
2020	34,667
2025	36,675

=== Languages ===
Population by
mother tongue (2025)
1. Finnish (88.0%)
2. Swedish (5.10%)
3. Russian (1.00%)
4. Arabic (0.70%)
5. Estonian (0.60%)
6. Albanian (0.50%)
7. Vietnamese (0.50%)
8. Other (3.60%)

Kaarina is a monolingual Finnish-speaking municipality. The majority of the population, 32,265 persons (88%), spoke Finnish as their first language. In addition, the number of Swedish speakers was 1,877 persons (5.1%) of the population. Foreign languages were spoken by 6.9% of the population. As English and Swedish are compulsory school subjects, functional bilingualism or trilingualism acquired through language studies is not uncommon.

At least 30 different languages are spoken in Kaarina. The most common foreign languages are Russian (1.0%), Arabic (0.7%), Estonian (0.6%) and Albanian (0.5%).

== Politics ==
Results of the 2011 Finnish parliamentary election in Kaarina:

- National Coalition Party 29.7%
- Social Democratic Party 21.2%
- True Finns 17.8%
- Left Alliance 9.5%
- Green League 7.1%
- Centre Party 6.6%
- Swedish People's Party 3.4%
- Christian Democrats 2.8%

== Gallery ==
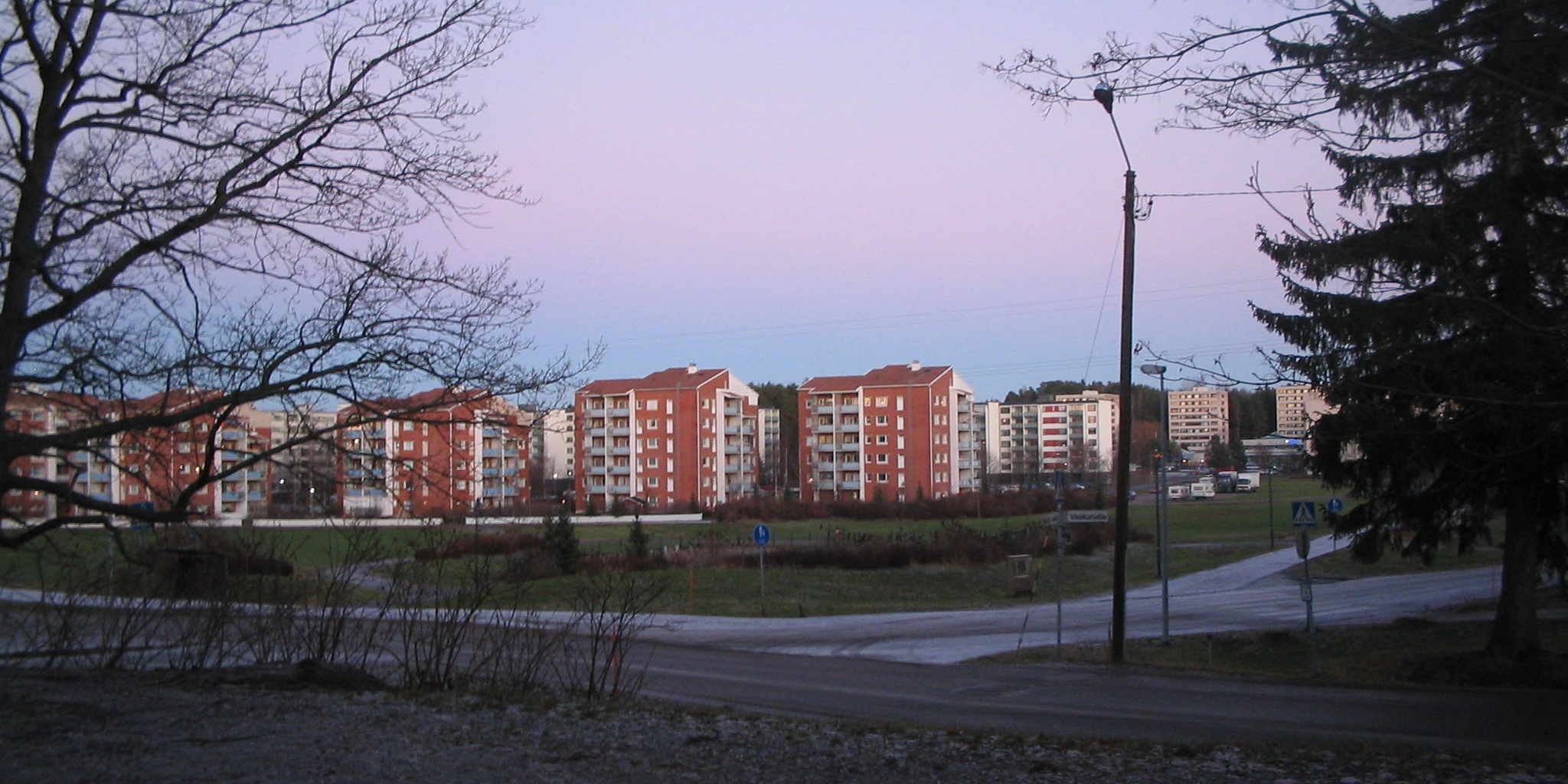
Residential blocks in Kaarina

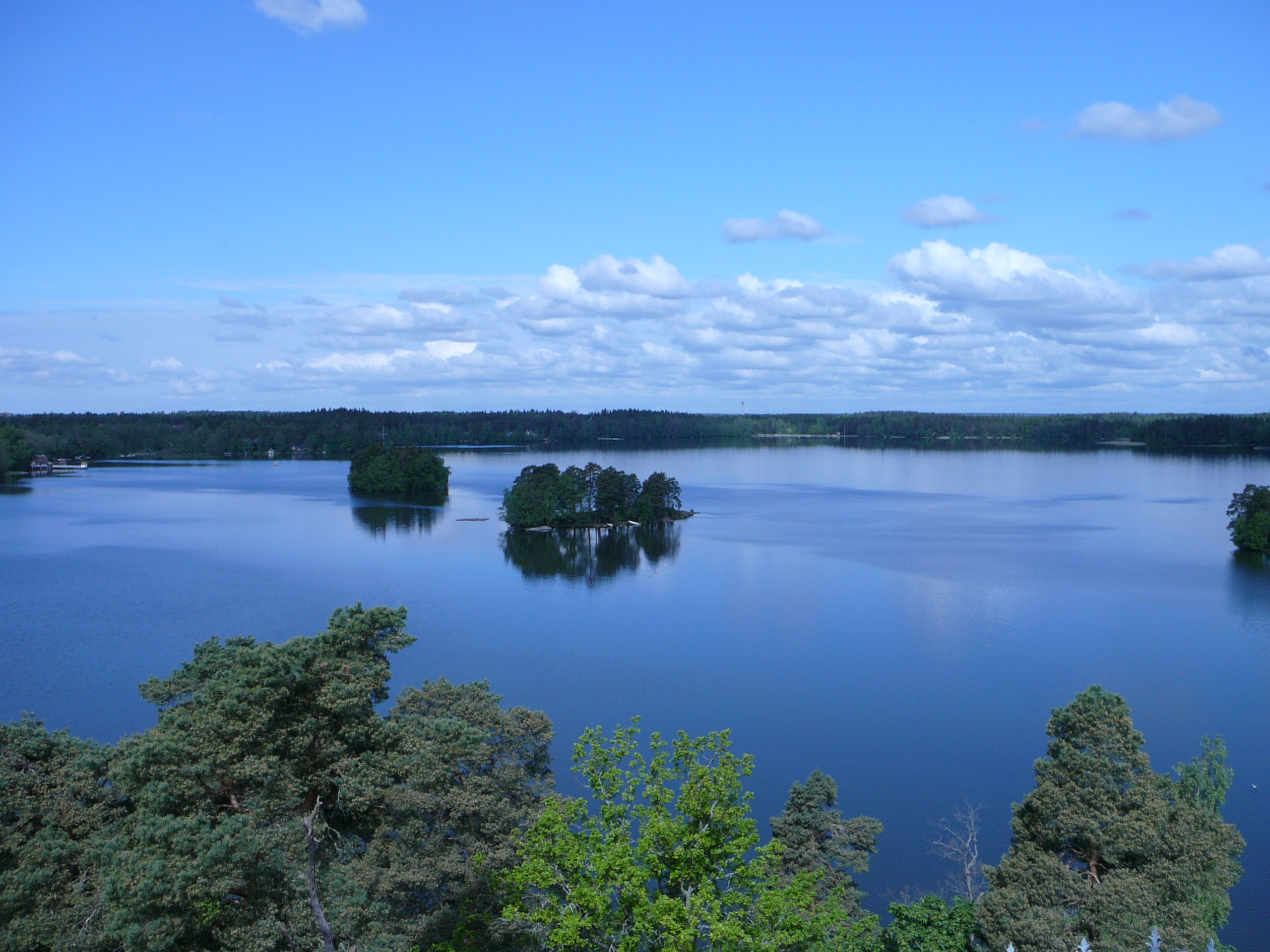
Lake Littoistenjärvi

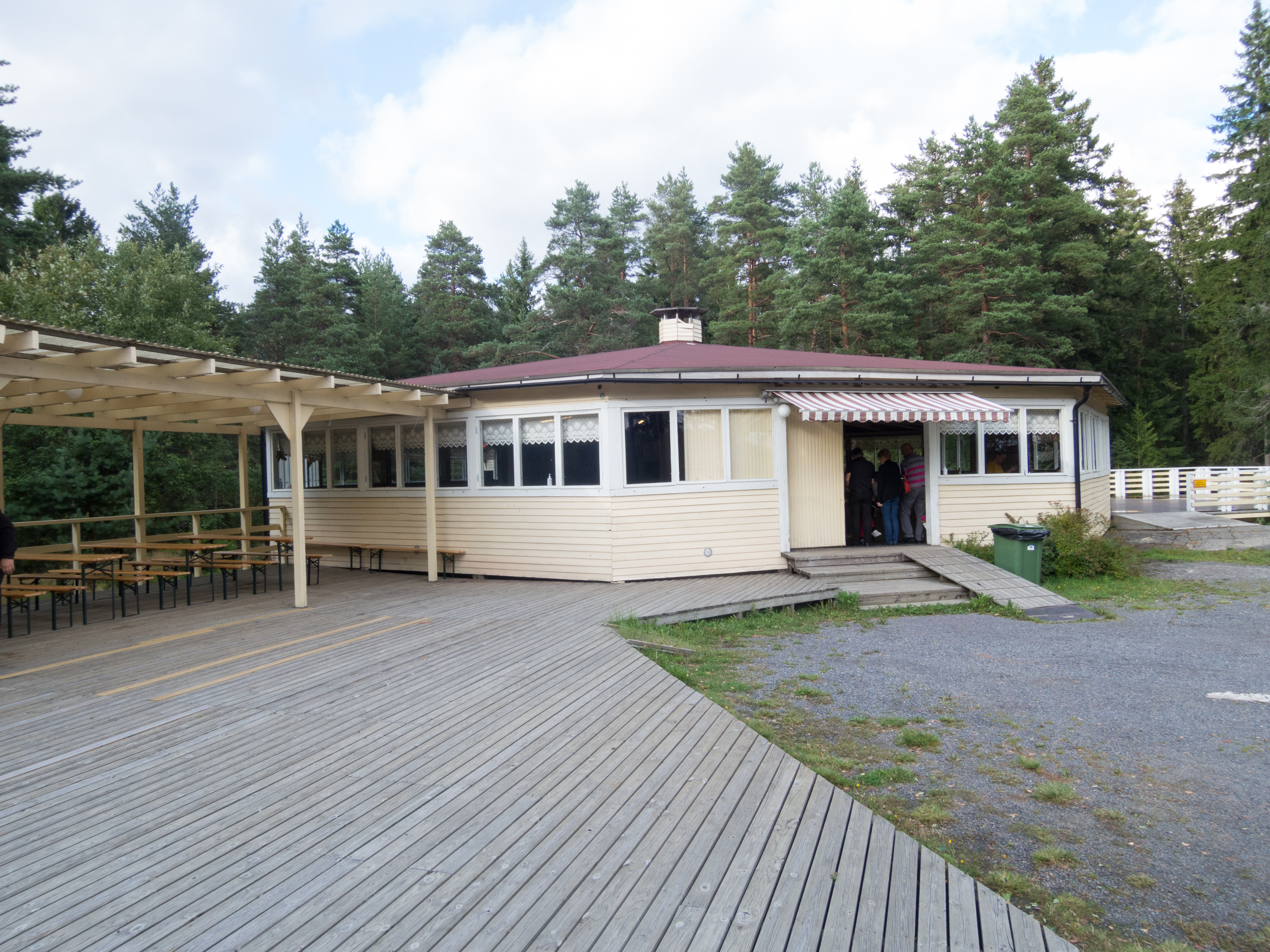
Dance pavilion in Littoinen

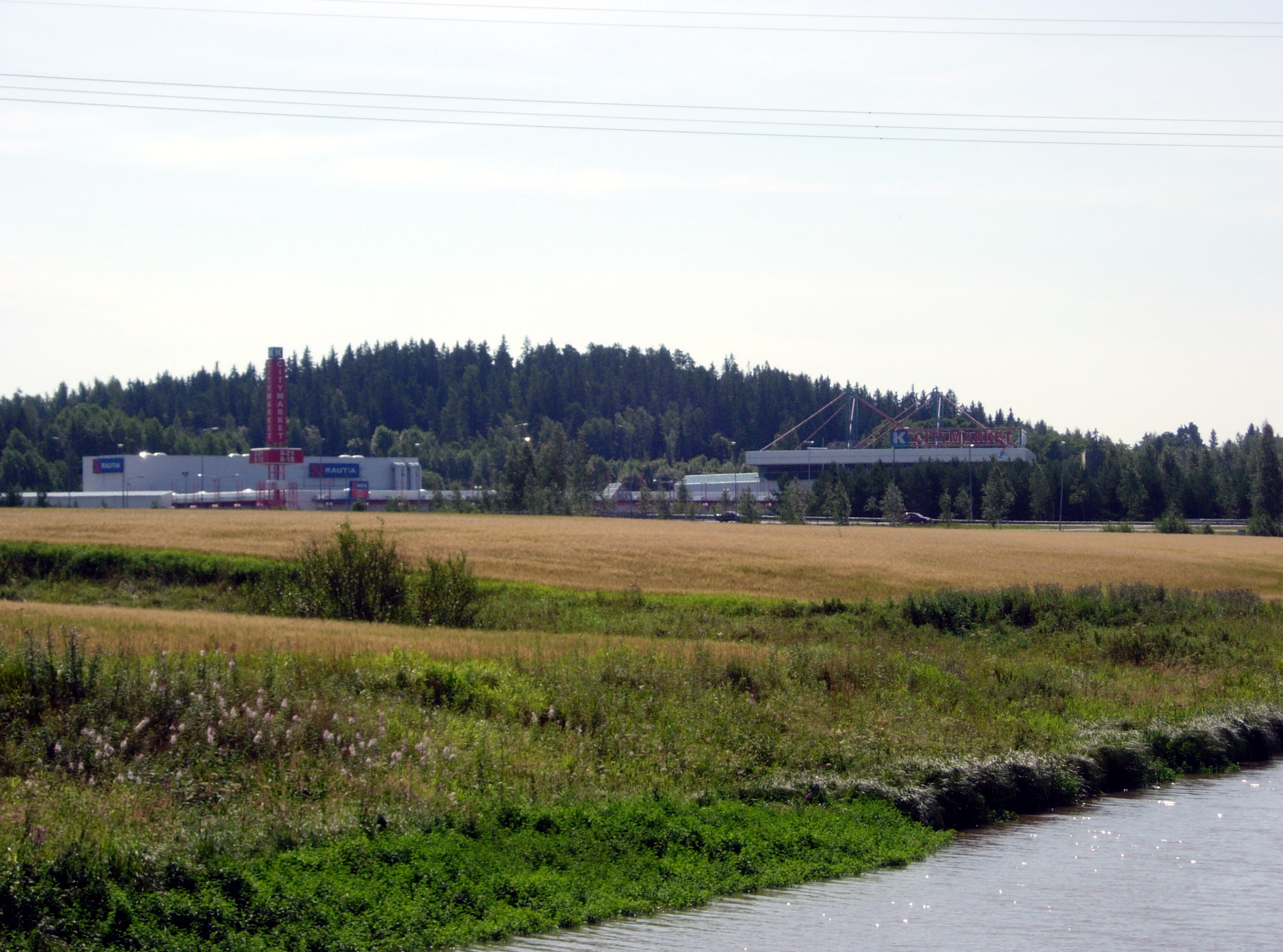
Ravattula

== International relations ==
=== Twin towns — Sister cities ===
Kaarina is twinned with:

- Ansião, Portugal
- Jõgeva, Estonia
- Enköping, Sweden
- Szentes, Hungary
- Sovetsky, Russia (on ice due to Russian invasion of Ukraine)

== See also ==
- Kuusisto Castle
- Ravattula Church
