= Ravattula Church =

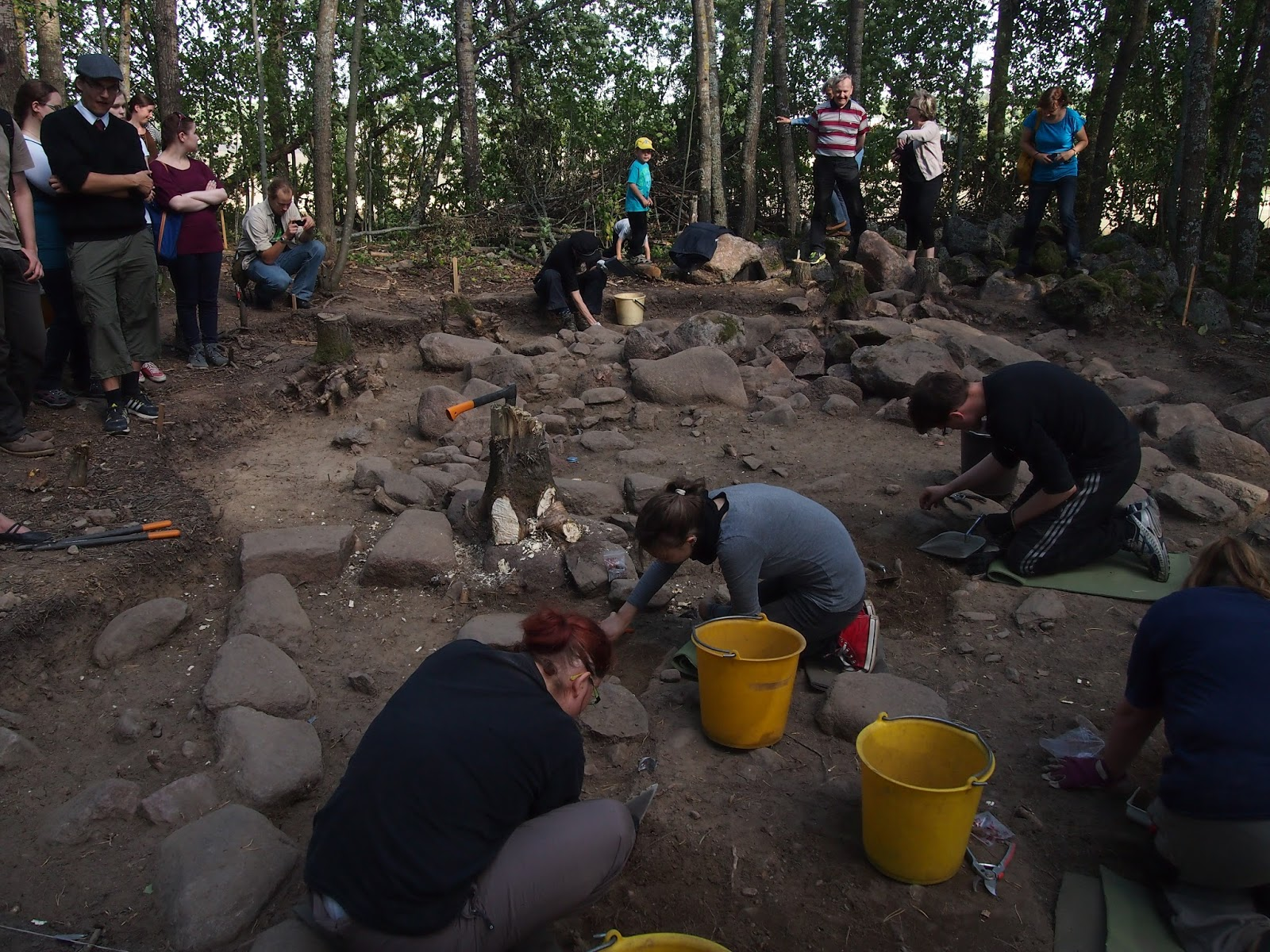
- 2013 excavations at the site of Ravattula Church

- Location within Finland

General information
- Location: Kaarina, Finland
- Coordinates: 60.4705°N 22.3428°E
- Construction started: late 12th Century–early 13th Century
- Demolished: 1230s–1240s

Ravattula Church (also the Ristimäki Church) was a Medieval church in the village of Ravattula in Kaarina, Finland. It is the oldest known church site in Finland, dating back to the late 12th century–early 13th century. The well-preserved foundations of a wooden church were found on the Ristimäki hill in 2013.

The Ravattula Church was a wooden building approximately the size of 6×10 meters. It consisted of two rooms and a smaller narrow choir. The church was built with a horizontal timbering technique and the floor was covered with planks. The only remains today are the foundations made of stone.

The church was used for only few decades until the 1230s or 1240s. It was demolished and the wooden material was most likely used elsewhere. Ravattula Church is surrounded by a cemetery which may date back to the late Iron Age. The site is located by the river Aurajoki, some 4 kilometers upstream the present Turku Cathedral which was completed in 1300.
