= Ulvila =

Town in Satakunta, Finland

Ulvila Ulvsby
- Town
- Ulvilan kaupunki Ulvsby stad
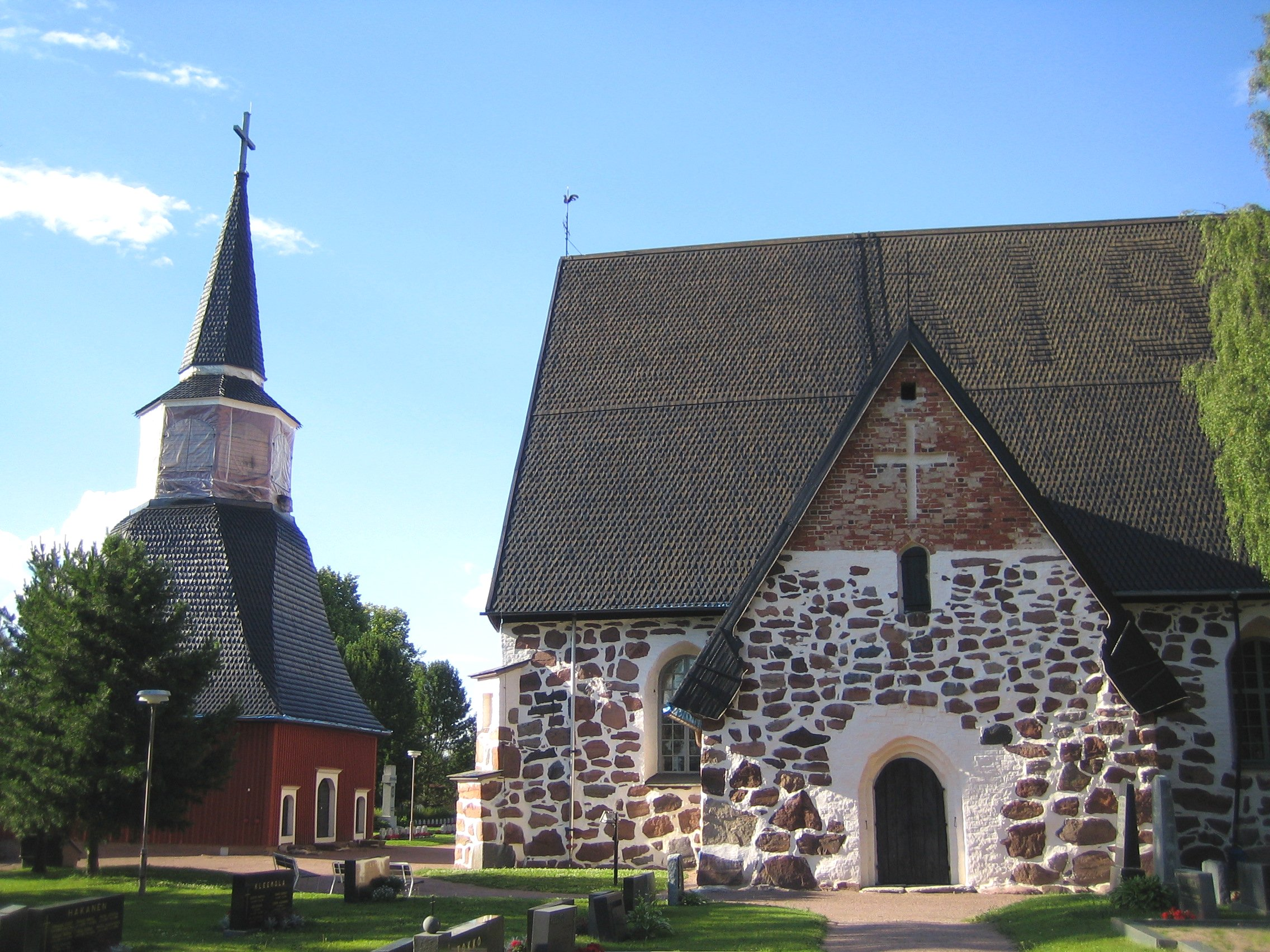
- St. Olaf's Church in Ulvila, one of the most significant medieval buildings in Finland

- Coat of arms

- Location of Ulvila in Finland
- Interactive map of Ulvila
- Coordinates: 61°25′57″N 21°52′57″E
- Country: Finland
- Region: Satakunta
- Sub-region: Pori
- Charter (as a town): 1365
- Lost town privileges: 1558
- Regained town privileges: 2000

Government
  - Town manager: Mikko Löfbacka

Area (2018-01-01)
  - Total: 422.51 km^{2} (163.13 sq mi)
  - Land: 400.82 km^{2} (154.76 sq mi)
  - Water: 21.82 km^{2} (8.42 sq mi)
  - Rank: 204th largest in Finland

Population (2025-12-31)
  - Total: 12,339
  - Rank: 83rd largest in Finland
  - Density: 30.78/km^{2} (79.7/sq mi)

Population by native language
  - Finnish: 96.3% (official)
  - Swedish: 0.3%
  - Others: 3.3%

Population by age
  - 0 to 14: 16.5%
  - 15 to 64: 56.7%
  - 65 or older: 26.8%
- Time zone: UTC+02:00 (EET)
  - Summer (DST): UTC+03:00 (EEST)
- Climate: Dfb
- Website: www.ulvila.fi

Ulvila (Finnish: [ˈulʋilɑ]; Swedish: Ulvsby) is a town and municipality of Finland. It is one of the six medieval cities of Finland, as well as the third oldest city in the country. Ulvila was granted charter as a town by King Albert of Sweden on 7 February 1365. However, its town privileges were taken over by Pori in 1558. After 442 years, Ulvila regained town privileges in 2000.

Ulvila is located in the region of Satakunta and the former province of Western Finland. The town is situated just 9 kilometres (5.6 mi) southeast of the city of Pori along Highway 2. The municipality has a population of 12,339 (31 December 2025) and covers an area of 422.51 square kilometres (163.13 sq mi), of which 21.82 km^{2} (8.42 sq mi) is water. The population density is 30.78 inhabitants per square kilometre (79.7/sq mi).

The municipality is unilingually Finnish.

The medieval St. Olaf's Church is dedicated to St. Olaf, who also is portrayed in the arms of the municipality. The medieval fieldstone church, also known as Ulvila Church, is one of the best-preserved of its kind in Finland.

== Politics ==
Results of the Finnish municipal elections 2021 in Ulvila:

- Social Democratic Party 29.6%
- National Coalition Party 23.4%
- Centre Party 15.3%
- True Finns 14.5%
- Left Alliance 9.1%
- Christian Democrats 4.8%
- Green League 3.3%

== Transport ==
Ulvila is served by OnniBus.com route Helsinki—Pori.

== International relations ==
=== Twin towns — Sister cities ===
Ulvila is twinned with:

- Ljusdal Municipality, Sweden
- Suure-Jaani, Estonia

== Notable people from Ulvila ==
- Aurora Karamzin (born 1808) - philanthropist and lady-in-waiting
- Simo Frangén (born 1963) – television presenter and humorist
- Kaarlo Kangasniemi (born 1941) – weightlifter and sports personality
- Kauko Kangasniemi (1942–2013) – weightlifter
- Mauno Lindroos (born 1941) – weightlifter
- Patrik Raitanen (born 2001) – footballer
- Karl Reilin (1874–1962) – sports shooter
- Raili Riuttala (born 1933) – freestyle swimmer
- Sylvi Salonen (1920–2003) – actress
- Sofianna Sundelin (born 2003) – ice hockey player
- Kalle Varonen (born 1974) – freestyle swimmer

== See also ==
- Finnish national road 2
- Finnish national road 11
- Kokemäki
- Kullaa
- Ulvila Old Town
- 2006 Ulvila homicide case
