= Misery (play) =

Plays based on the Stephen King book

Misery (Moore adaptation)
- Promotional poster for the 1992 play
- Book: Simon Moore
- Basis: Misery by Stephen King
- Premiere: December 17, 1992: Criterion Theatre, London
- Productions: 1992–93 Criterion Theatre; 1994 Tampere Theatre; 2005 GableStage; 2005 King's Head Theatre

Misery (Rooijen adaptation)
- Music: Florus Van Rooijen
- Book: Florus Van Rooijen
- Basis: Misery by Stephen King
- Premiere: August 7, 2014: Theatre van 't Woord
- Productions: 2014 Theatre van 't Woord

Stephen King's 1987 novel Misery has been adapted as a play several times, notably by Simon Moore and William Goldman, who also wrote the 1990 film.

== Characters and casts ==
Production	Writer/Translator	Annie Wilkes	Paul Sheldon	Sheriff Buster
Criterion Theatre (1992–93)	Simon Moore	Sharon Gless	Bill Paterson	—N/a
Tampere Theatre (1994)	Simon Moore/Timo Ojala	Tuija Vuolle	Vesa Veijalainen	—N/a
GableStage (2005)	Simon Moore	Lisa Morgan	Stephen G. Anthony	—N/a
King's Head Theatre (2005)	Simon Moore	Susan Penhaligon	Michael Praed	—N/a
Bucks County Playhouse (2012)	William Goldman	Johanna Day	Daniel Gerroll	James DeMarse
Theatre van 't Woord (2014)	Florus Van Rooijen	Marjolein Algera	Sander de Heer	—N/a
Broadhurst Theatre (2015–16)	William Goldman	Laurie Metcalf	Bruce Willis	Leon Addison Brown
Kwadrat Theatre (2017)	William Goldman/Jacek Kaduczak	Ewa Wencel	Piotr Polk	Marcin Pietowski
Kuopio City Theatre (2019)	William Goldman/Timo Mikkola	Henna Haverinen	Seppo Pääkkönen	Ari-Kyösti Seppo
Tampere Theatre (2019)	William Goldman/Timo Mikkola	Mari Turunen	Esa Latva-Äijö	Jukka Leisti
Pori Theatre (2022)	William Goldman/Timo Mikkola	Mirva Tolppanen	Vesa Haltsonen	Hannu Müller
Seinäjoki City Theatre (2025)	William Goldman/Timo Mikkola	Satu Silvo	Reidar Palmgren	Jukka Puronlahti

== Simon Moore adaptation ==
In 1992, Simon Moore wrote and directed a play based on Stephen King's novel Misery. The play premiered in London's Criterion Theatre on December 17, 1992, running for six months. The production starred Sharon Gless as Annie Wilkes and Bill Paterson as Paul Sheldon.

An August 2005 production at the GableStage in Coral Gables, Florida, was directed by Joseph Adler and starred Lisa Morgan and Stephen G. Anthony. In September of the same year, Alan Cohen directed a production at King's Head Theatre, starring Susan Penhaligon and Michael Praed.

=== Translations ===
Timo Ojala directed Finnish version based on Moore's play called Piina in 1994. It was premiered at Tampere Theatre in Tampere and it was starring by Vesa Veijalainen as Sheldon and Tuija Vuolle as Wilkes.

== Florus Van Rooijen adaptation ==
Composer Florus Van Rooijen wrote and directed a musical adaptation of the novel, which premiered in Amsterdam on August 7, 2014. It starred Sander de Heer, Marjolein Algera, Tara Hetharia (as Misery Chastain), and Buddy Vedder (as Ian Carmichael and Tony Bonasaro).

== William Goldman adaptation ==
Misery (Goldman adaptation)
- Book: William Goldman
- Basis: Misery by Stephen King
- Premiere: November 24, 2012: Bucks County Playhouse, Pennsylvania
- Productions: 2012 Bucks County Playhouse; 2015–16 Broadhurst Theatre; 2017 Kwadrat Theatre; 2019 Kuopio City Theatre; 2019 Tampere Theatre; 2022 Pori Theatre; 2025 Seinäjoki City Theatre
- Awards: 2016 Tony Award for Best Actress in a Play – Nominated

William Goldman's adaptation, created in association with Castle Rock Entertainment, premiered at the Bucks County Playhouse on November 24, 2012. It ran for 11 performances and closed on December 8, 2012. It was directed by Will Frears and starred Daniel Gerroll as Sheldon, Johanna Day as Wilkes, and James DeMarse as Sheriff Buster.

A new version of Goldman's play officially opened at the Broadhurst Theatre on October 22, 2015 and closed on February 16, 2016. This version starred Bruce Willis as Sheldon, Laurie Metcalf as Wilkes, and Leon Addison Brown as Buster. The show ran for 102 performances, grossing $12,518,415 in ticket sales.

Metcalf was nominated for the Best Actress in a Play at the 70th Tony Awards for her performance as Wilkes. Willis's performance as Sheldon was generally panned by critics, who called it "vacant" and "inert". One critic faulted Willis for using an ear piece when performing during previews.

=== Translations ===
Seinäjoki City Theatre's 2025 Finnish play adaptation Piina starring by Reidar Palmgren as Sheldon and Satu Silvo as Wilkes

Goldman's play was translated into Polish by Jacek Kaduczak and premiered at the Kwadrat Theatre in Warsaw on January 9, 2017. The production was directed by Robert Gliński and starred Ewa Wencel as Wilkes, Piotr Polk as Sheldon, and Marcin Pietowski as Buster.

Timo Mikkola translated Goldman's play into Finnish for a September 2019 production. Piina premiered at Kuopio City Theatre in Kuopio, directed by Olli Matti Oinonen and starring Seppo Pääkkönen as Sheldon, Henna Haverinen as Wilkes, and Ari-Kyösti Seppo as Buster. Since then, Mikkola's translation has been performed in October 2019 by Tampere Theatre (directed by Antti Mikkola and starring Mari Turunen, Esa Latva-Äijö, and Jukka Leisti), Pori Theatre in Pori in November 2022 (directed by Tuomo Aitta and starring Vesa Haltsonen, Mirva Tolppanen, and Hannu Müller), and in February 2025 by Seinäjoki City Theatre in Seinäjoki (directed by Olli-Matti Oinonen, who had previously directed the play at the Kuopio Theatre, and starring Satu Silvo and Reidar Palmgren).

== Awards and nominations ==
=== Original Broadway production ===
Year	Award	Category	Nominee	Result
2016	Tony Awards	Best Actress in a Play	Laurie Metcalf	Nominated

== See also ==
- List of adaptations of works by Stephen King
