= Mari Turunen =

Finnish actress (born 1970)

Mari Turunen (born 1970 in Joensuu) is a Finnish actress. She has become known for the Kummeli comedy series from 1994 to 2000, and films Kummeli: Kultakuume from 1997 and Kummelin Jackpot from 2006. She also starred in the 2021 crime drama television series Lakeside Murders (Koskinen).

She has been anchored in Tampere Theatre since 1997, previously she has been performing at Lahti City Theatre. In addition, she has worked as a guest actress at the Espoo City Theatre and the Tampere Workers' Theatre.

In 2019, Turunen played role of Annie Wilkes in Piina, a Finnish play adaptation (presented by Tampere Theatre) of Stephen King's Misery based on the novel's 1990 film adaptation's screenplay by William Goldman.
