= Misery (novel) =

1987 novel by Stephen King

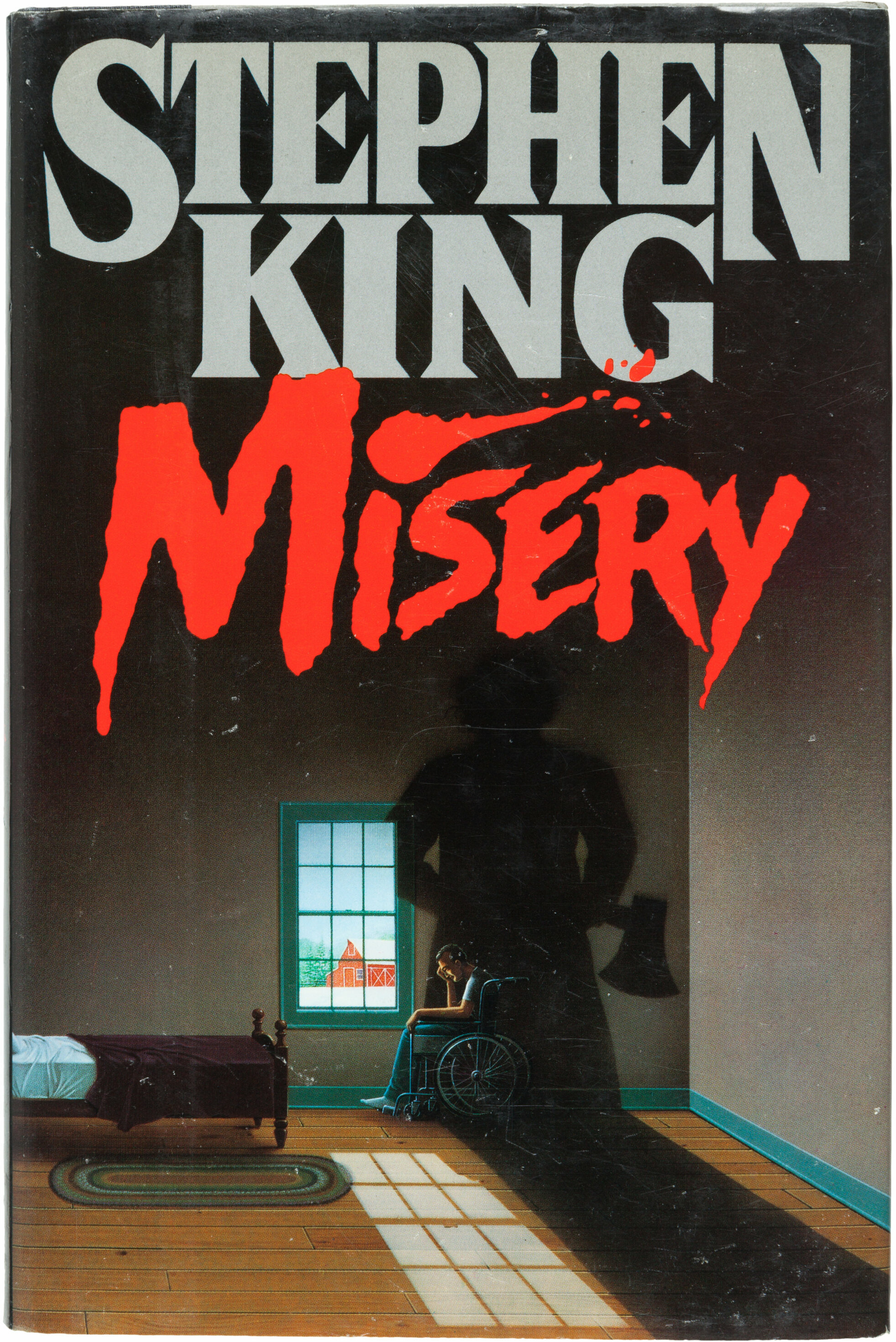
- First edition cover
- Author: Stephen King
- Language: English
- Genre: Psychological horror, thriller
- Publisher: Viking
- Publication date: June 8, 1987
- Publication place: United States
- Media type: Print (hardcover)
- Pages: 310
- ISBN: 978-0-670-81364-3

Misery is a psychological horror novel by U.S. author Stephen King, first published by Viking Press on June 8, 1987.

The novel hinges on the relationship between its two main characters – novelist Paul Sheldon and his self-proclaimed number-one fan, Annie Wilkes. When Sheldon is seriously injured following a car accident, former nurse Annie rescues him and keeps him prisoner in her isolated farmhouse.

Misery, which took fourth place in the 1987 bestseller list, was adapted into an Academy Award–winning film directed by Rob Reiner, in 1990, and into a theatrical production starring Laurie Metcalf and Bruce Willis in 2015.

== Background ==
The novel's title refers to the eponymous heroine of Sheldon's book series and to King's state of mind during its writing. King outlined the creation of Misery in his memoirs, and mentioned that the character of Annie Wilkes came to him in a dream. The book was initially scheduled for release under the pseudonym Richard Bachman, but King's identity was revealed before publication.

One of King's inspirations for Misery was the reaction his fans had to his 1984 novel The Eyes of the Dragon. Many fans rejected The Eyes of the Dragon because it was an epic fantasy book, with virtually none of the horror that initially made his reputation. Paul Sheldon's feeling of being chained to the Misery books by his fans was an expression of King's feelings towards horror fiction. Another element was King's addiction to drugs and alcohol, and his struggle to get sober. He stated: "Annie was my drug problem, and she was my number-one fan." When further addressing the idea of whether Sheldon was a self-portrait, King stated: "Certain parts of him are ... but I think you will find that, if you continue to write fiction, every character you create is partly you."

King has also attributed the story's origin to a dream he had while on a transatlantic flight to London. He wrote the idea on an American Airlines cocktail napkin when he woke up so he could make sure to remember it, writing: "She speaks earnestly but never quite makes eye contact. A big woman and solid all through; she is an absence of hiatus. 'I wasn't trying to be funny in a mean way when I named my pig Misery, no sir. Please don't think that. No, I named her in the spirit of fan love, which is the purest love there is. You should be flattered.'"

King and his wife, Tabitha King, stayed in London's Brown's Hotel, where he wrote "sixteen pages of a steno notebook". The concierge let him work at a desk once owned by Rudyard Kipling, who had died of a stroke while using it. King thought that the book would only be around 30,000 words, but it ended up being almost four times that at 370 pages. Its working title was The Annie Wilkes Edition. While discussing the pros and cons of pre-plotting novels, King mentioned that he had initially planned for Annie to force her prisoner to write a book, which she would then bind in Paul's skin. When commenting on why he chose not to go down that route, King said:

... it would have made a pretty good story...but that wasn't the way things eventually went. Paul Sheldon turned out to be a good deal more resourceful than I initially thought, and his efforts to play Scheherazade and save his life gave me a chance to say some things about the redemptive power of writing that I had long felt but never articulated. Annie also turned out to be more complex than I'd first imagined her, and she was great fun to write about ..."

== Plot ==
Paul Sheldon, the author of the best-selling series of Victorian-era romance novels featuring the character Misery Chastain, has finished the series' final installment, in which Misery is killed off. As Paul celebrates the completion of the manuscript for his new crime novel, Fast Cars, he is caught in a snowstorm in a remote section of Colorado, causing him to crash into a snowbank. He awakens to find that he has been rescued by Annie Wilkes, a former nurse living nearby. Annie is an avid reader of Paul's Misery series, proclaiming herself Paul's "number one fan." She refuses to take Paul to the hospital despite his having two severely broken legs, nursing Paul herself using her stockpiled food and illicit stash of codeine-based painkillers, to which Paul quickly becomes addicted. Paul soon assesses that Annie is mentally unstable; she is prone to trailing off into catatonic episodes and has bouts of unreasonable rage, implying that she has schizophrenia or a schizoaffective disorder as well as a bipolar spectrum disorder.

When Annie learns of Misery's death in the book, she leaves Paul alone in her house for over two days, depriving him of food, water, and painkillers. Upon her return, she forces a weakened Paul to burn the manuscript for Fast Cars – which he hoped would launch his post-Misery career – and presents him with an antique Royal typewriter, for the purpose of writing a new Misery novel that will bring the character back from the dead. Biding his time, Paul begins a new book, Misery's Return, and allows Annie to read it as he writes. He manages to escape his room in a wheelchair on several different occasions, searching for more painkillers and exploring the house. He discovers a scrapbook full of newspaper clippings, suggesting that she is a serial killer who has murdered over thirty people. Meanwhile, Annie grows increasingly depressed and reveals that she knows Paul left his room. She punishes him by cutting off his foot with an axe and cauterizing his ankle with a blowtorch. Later, when Paul complains about the typewriter, she cuts off his thumb with an electric knife.

Colorado state trooper Duane Kushner eventually arrives at Annie's house in search of Paul. When Paul attempts to alert him, Annie murders Kushner by running him over with her riding lawnmower, and decides that she will shoot both Paul and herself after the novel is finished. While she disposes of the body, Paul steals a can of lighter fluid, which he uses to light the completed manuscript on fire. As Annie attempts to save it, he beats her with the typewriter, and they engage in a violent struggle. Paul is finally able to alert the police, who have arrived in search of the dead officer, Kushner. Annie is found dead from her injuries in the barn, apparently on her way to murder Paul with a chainsaw. Paul reveals that he had burned a decoy copy of the manuscript, and the real one is unharmed.

Returning home to New York, Paul submits Misery's Return to his publisher, which is set to become an international bestseller. Paul has frequent nightmares about Annie, and continues to have withdrawal from painkillers. He has also become an alcoholic with writer's block. Eventually, after a random encounter on the street, Paul gains inspiration to write a new story, weeping both for his shattered life and in joy that he is finally able to write again.

== Reception ==
Misery won the first Bram Stoker Award for Best Novel in 1987 and was nominated for the 1988 World Fantasy Award for Best Novel. It received largely positive reviews and reached Number 4 on the New York Times bestseller list. The Guardian called it: "one of the greatest thrillers ever written". Kirkus Reviews praised its dark humour and relative leanness, saying: "...this nasty shard of a novel with its weird autobiographical implications probably will thrill and chill King's legion of fans." It has been called one of King's best novels, and one of his scariest.

== Adaptations ==
=== Film ===
The novel was adapted into a film in 1990, directed by Rob Reiner and written by William Goldman. James Caan and Kathy Bates starred as Paul Sheldon and Annie Wilkes, with Lauren Bacall, Richard Farnsworth and Frances Sternhagen in supporting roles. The film was a critical and commercial success, and continues to be ranked as one of the best Stephen King adaptations. For her performance as Annie Wilkes, Kathy Bates won the 1991 Academy Award for Best Actress – one of the few Oscar wins for a performance in the horror genre, and the first for any King adaptation – and was launched into mainstream stardom. In June 2003, the American Film Institute included Annie Wilkes, as played by Bates, in their "100 Heroes and Villains" list, ranking her as the 17th most iconic villain (and sixth most iconic villainess) in the history of film.

=== Television ===
A version of Annie Wilkes, portrayed by Lizzy Caplan, is the main character of the second season of Castle Rock. The season finale concludes with Annie attending a book signing for a Misery novel by Paul Sheldon, which begins her obsession.

=== Stage ===
The novel was also adapted into a play by Simon Moore. The play premiered in London at the Criterion Theater in December 1992, starring Sharon Gless and Bill Paterson and directed by Moore. The play, directed by Alan Cohen, was revived in 2005 at the King's Head Theatre in London, starring Michael Praed and Susan Penhaligon. In 2014, Dutch composer and theater producer Florus van Rooijen adapted the novel into a "feel bad" musical.

A different play written by William Goldman (who also wrote the film's screenplay) and directed by Will Frears opened on Broadway in 2015 for a limited engagement. The play starred Bruce Willis as Paul Sheldon and Laurie Metcalf as Annie Wilkes. It opened in October 2015 and closed on February 16, 2016. For her performance as Wilkes, Metcalf was nominated for a Tony Award for Best Actress in a Play. The play was originally premiered in 2012 at Bucks County Playhouse before moving to Broadway. This new version is not connected to the earlier adaptation by Simon Moore.

In October 2019, a Finnish play adaptation of Misery called Piina was performed at the Tampere Theatre in Tampere, Finland. The play was directed by Antti Mikkola and starring Esa Latva-Äijö as Paul Sheldon and Mari Turunen as Annie Wilkes. Also in September of the same year, Kuopio City Theatre in Kuopio, Finland, presented another interpretation under the name Piina, directed by Olli-Matti Oinonen and starring Seppo Pääkkönen as Paul Sheldon and Henna Haverinen as Annie Wilkes. In November 2022, Pori Theatre in Pori, Finland presented third interpretation, directed by Tuomo Aitta and starring Vesa Haltsonen as Paul Sheldon and Mirva Tolppanen as Annie Wilkes. An upcoming fourth play of the Seinäjoki City Theatre in Seinäjoki will premiere in February 2025, and it will be directed by Olli-Matti Oinonen (who previously directed the play at the Kuopio Theatre) and starring Satu Silvo as Annie Wilkes and Reidar Palmgren as Paul Sheldon.

=== Radio ===
Moore's stage adaptation was itself adapted for radio and broadcast on the BBC World Service. The program was produced by Dirk Maggs, directed by Marion Nancarrow, and starred Nicholas Farrell as Paul Sheldon and Miriam Margolyes as Annie Wilkes. The program was later released on CD by the BBC.
