= Satu Silvo =

Finnish actress and entrepreneur

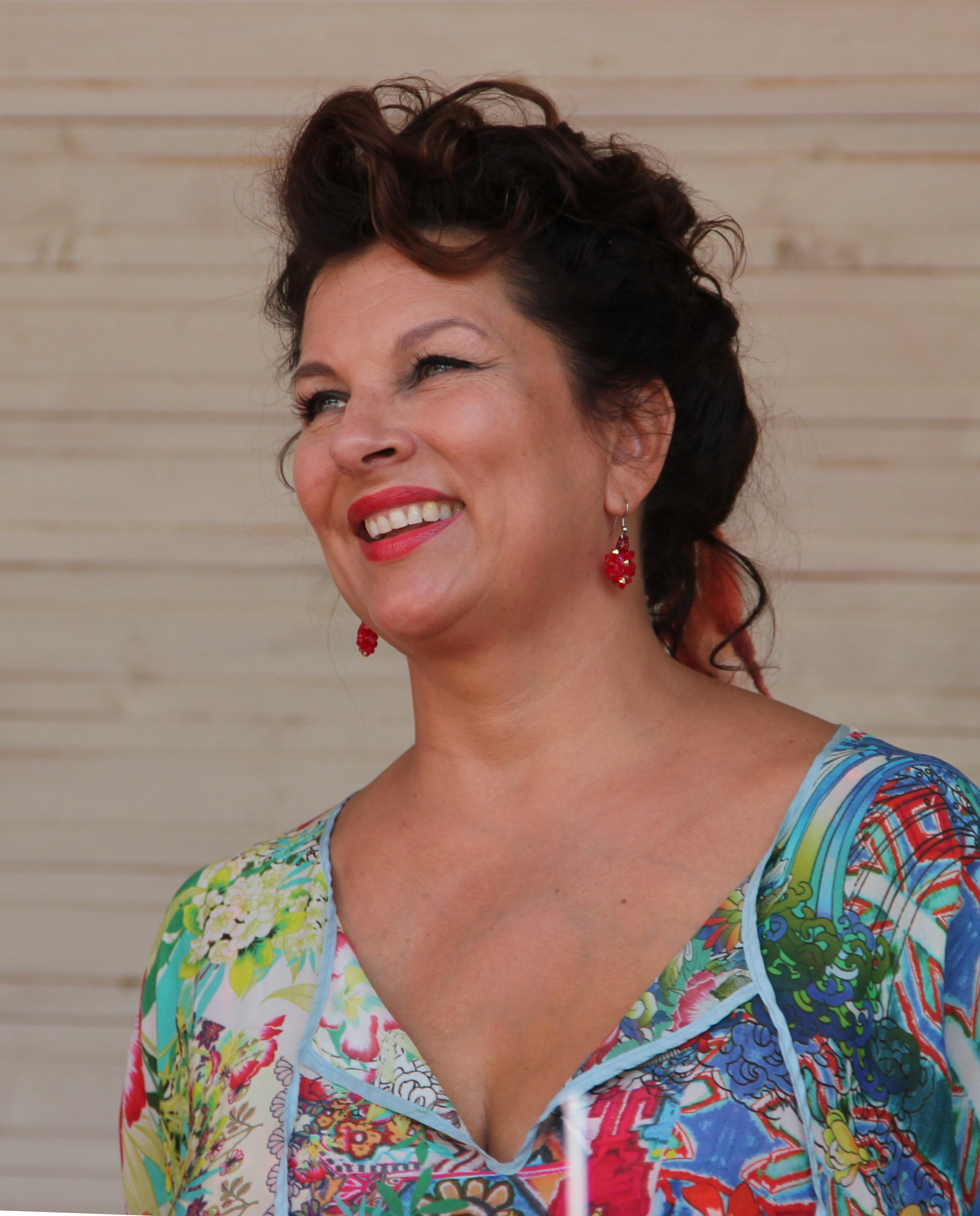
- Satu Silvo, August 2015
- Born: 2 August 1962 (age 64); Sippola, Finland
- Occupation: Actress

Satu Irmeli Silvo (born August 2, 1962, in Sippola, Finland) is a Finnish actress and entrepreneur. In her artistic interpretations she has frequently portrayed the complicated role of an independent, emancipated woman, whose values and lifestyle are contradictory to the so-called traditional woman's role.

== Career ==
After having studied acting at the Helsinki Theatre Academy from 1981 till 1985, Silvo began her professional career in the Helsinki City Theater. Since 1994 she has worked as a freelancer. While still at the Theater School, Silvo was cast as the female lead in the epic feature film Niskavuori directed by Matti Kassila. In 1986 she played the main character in The Snow Queen. In the 1990s she had several leading roles in Finnish feature films, both comical and dramatic. In the five comical Pekko films created and directed by Timo Koivusalo she played Pipsa, the central female character.

In theater she has played leading roles in a variety of drama plays as well as in multiple comedy and farce pieces. Her roles include Stella in A Streetcar Named Desire and Anja in the Finnish drama play Eteisiin ja kynnyksille. She has also played in musicals such as Annie, Chicago and Nine. In 2025, Silvo will play role of Annie Wilkes in Piina, a Finnish play adaptation (presented by Seinäjoki City Theatre) of Stephen King's Misery based on the novel's 1990 film adaptation's screenplay by William Goldman.

In 1998 she hosted her own television show Satua ja totta ("Truth and Make-Believe").

In the 2000s and 2010s she has made several supporting roles in Finnish feature films alongside her stage career which includes several female leads in theatrical productions of The Comedy Theater Arena and Ryhmäteatteri, both in Helsinki.

As an entrepreneur she has run a vegetarian restaurant in Hakaniemi, Helsinki since 1998. From 2001 till 2007 she was the co-owner of the Hotel Satulinna in Hirvensalmi.

== Private life ==
In 1986 Silvo married the actor Heikki Kinnunen (b. 1946) with whom she has a son and a daughter. The couple divorced in 2002. The daughter Vilma Kinnunen has played a couple of supporting roles in Finnish television productions. Since the early 2010s Silvo has been romantically involved with the writer and actor Reidar Palmgren (b. 1966).

In 1998 she suffered life-threatening injuries in an alpine ski accident in Saariselkä, Lapland, but has since fully recovered.

== Selected filmography ==
- Niskavuori ("The Famous Niskavuori Saga", 1984)
- Uuno Epsanjassa ("Numbskull Emptybrook in Spain", 1985)
- Lumikuningatar ("The Snow Queen", 1986)
- Porttikielto taivaaseen ("Banned from Heaven", 1990)
- Pekko aikamiespojan poikamiesaika ("The Bachelor Days of Pekko The Bachelor", 1993)
- Kaikki pelissä ("Play It All", 1994)
- Pekko ja poika ("Pekko and The Boy", 1994)
- Pekko ja massahurmaaja ("Pekko and The Mass Seducer", 1995)
- Pekko ja muukalainen ("Pekko and The Stranger", 1996)
- Tie naisen sydämeen ("The Way to a Woman's Heart", 1996)
- Pekko ja unissakävelijä ("Pekko and The Sleepwalker", 1997)
- Ralliraita (2009) ("The Rally Movie")
- Jos rakastat (2010) ("If You Love")
- Reunion (2015)

== Television series ==
- Musta tuntuu (1985)
- Ottaako sydämestä? (1995–1996)
- Herkku & Partanen (1996)
- Ihmeidentekijät (1996–1998)
- Satua ja totta (1998–1999)
- Parhaat vuodet (2000–2002) (Follow-up series to Ihmeidentekijät)
- Pelkovaara (2004)
- Tallitähdet (2008)
- Hurtta ja stara (2008)
- Helsingin herra (2012)
- Moominvalley (2019–)
