= Julie Ganapathi =

- VCD cover
- Directed by: Balu Mahendra
- Screenplay by: Balu Mahendra
- Based on: Misery by Stephen King
- Produced by: V. Gnanavelu; V. Jayaprakash
- Starring: Saritha; Jayaram; Ramya Krishnan
- Cinematography: Balu Mahendra
- Edited by: Balu Mahendra
- Music by: Ilaiyaraaja
- Production company: GJ Cinemaa
- Release date: 14 February 2003
- Country: India
- Language: Tamil

Julie Ganapathi is a 2003 Indian Tamil-language psychological thriller film written, photographed, edited and directed by Balu Mahendra, starring Saritha, Jayaram and Ramya Krishnan. Based on the 1987 Stephen King novel Misery, it follows a television writer who is held captive by an obsessive fan of his series and forced to write the remaining episodes to her liking. The film was released on 14 February 2003.

== Plot ==
Julie Ganapathi is a staunch fan of a popular television show Manga. Over the years, Julie grows to identify herself obsessively with the main character of the show. The author of the series, Tenkasi Balakumaran "Bala", leaves his home for a few days to be alone to write the final few episodes of Manga. On his way back home after completing his work, his vehicle gets into an accident which leaves him seriously injured and disabled. Julie rescues Bala and takes him home, but she is revealed to be mentally unstable, and deliriously obsessed with the character in Bala's story. Julie asks Bala to allow her to read the scripts for the concluding episodes that he has just completed.

Over the next few days, Julie reads the story and finds the ending not to her liking. She forces Bala to rewrite the ending by various means, forcing him to escape his captor's clutches before it is too late. Soon after, Bala becomes aware of how Julie has not informed anyone of his situation and is not at all planning to release him anytime soon. As a result, he tries to escape her home. In this, he is caught and suspended to remain in his room. She also disables him from getting up.

Afterwards, a policeman investigating Bala's disappearance decides to go to the house of Julie since she has made her love for Manga known around the village. When investigating her home, he discovers that Bala is in fact being kept there. Julie then draws a weapon and kills him. She informs Bala that they will then die together. To buy some time he uses the excuse of having to finish his new version of the final Manga script. With that, he finishes, tricks Julie into getting him a weapon, and with a fight, manages to kill Julie and escape. The film forwards to Bala with his family, discussing with the press his experiences, stating that she was in fact an inspiration to him.

== Cast ==
- Saritha as Julie Ganapathi
- Jayaram as Tenkasi Balakumaran
- Ramya Krishnan as Vijaya
- Mohan Raman as Channel's Head
- Sashikumar as Sashi
- Dhivyadharshini as Writer
- Naren as Naren, Julie's husband
- Junior Balaiah as Julie's house Watchman
- Delhi Ganesh as Inspector Ganesh
- Shanmugasundari as Neighborhood for Jayaram, Serial lover
- Vatsala Rajagopal as Vijaya's mother
- Amarasigamani as a police Inspector

== Production ==
Balu Mahendra said the story of Julie Ganapathi was derived from a novel he believed was the Tamil translation of Stephen King's novel Misery, and stated that he had not watched the 1990 American film version of the novel. His comments have drawn sceptism from critics who note that the 2003 film had reused multiple scenes from the 1990 film that were not present in the novel, and believe he may have actually adapted a Tamil translated novelisation of the 1990 film. Mahendra drew comparisons between the similar theme of the film, with his previous ventures Moodu Pani (1980) and Moondram Pirai (1982). Mahendra chose Jayaram to play the lead role, after having watched and been impressed with several of the actor's performances in films, as a part of jury committees for awards. The actor's Malayali background meant that he adapted the script to make the protagonist a Malayali-born settler in Tamil Nadu. Jayaram recommended Saritha's name for the film, and the actress made a comeback to cinema after an extended sabbatical. For her role, Mahendra had requested Saritha to put on 10 kilograms (22 lb), and after an initial period of hesitance, the actress agreed. A major portion of the film was shot in a single room with just two actors, Jayaram and Saritha, with Mahendra opting to use only natural light. Since the light that entered the room was diffused, Mahendra was able to film many sequences set during the day at night. The producers of the film insisted that a song be added for commercial viability and against his own wishes, Mahendra shot and included a sensuous song featuring Ramya Krishnan.

== Soundtrack ==
The music was composed by Ilaiyaraaja. Vignesh Ram of Nilacharal wrote, "Overall this is a vintage Ilaiyaraja album which is surely a treasure for Raja's fans". Sajahan Waheed of New Straits Times called it "another memorable effort from veteran composer Illayaraja".

Track listing
No.	Title	Lyrics	Singer(s)	Length
1.	"Minmini Paarvaigal"	Ra. Karunanidhi	K. J. Yesudas	5:04
2.	"Enakku Piditha Paadal" (female)	Na. Muthukumar	Shreya Ghoshal	4:31
3.	"Kaakka Kaakka"	Palani Bharathi	Anitha	6:28
4.	"Enakku Piditha Paadal" (male)	Na. Muthukumar	Vijay Yesudas	4:30
5.	"Idhayamae Idhayamae"	Mu. Metha	Shreya Ghoshal	4:30
6.	"Thanni Konjam Yeri Irukku"	Muthulingam	Kalpana Raghavendar	4:38
Total length:				29:41

== Reception ==
A reviewer from Sify wrote, "the film is dark, deadly, daring and is the best thriller to come along in years", adding that it is "recommended and a must-see for those who love thrillers". Shobha Warrier of Rediff.com also gave the film a positive review, noting "Balu Mahendra proves even after five years he has not lost his touch" and that "is a film worth watching". Indiainfo lauded Saritha's performance, saying she "overshadows everyone" and appreciated Ilaiyaraaja's music, concluding that Balu Mahendra is "still in a good form".

Malini Mannath wrote in Chennai Online, "The theme is widely different from the routine romance-action variety. There are just two characters in the frame for most of the time, and it's up to the duo and the director to carry the film through, and keep the audience hooked to the screen. Which they've managed to do to a large extent". Likewise, Malathi Rangarajan of The Hindu also gave the film a positive review, praising the performances of Saritha and Jayaram, and adding that Balu Mahendra's work is a "fulfilling fare" and "that the veteran lives up to it in inimitable style". Visual Dasan of Kalki lauded the film, but was critical of the inclusion of the dance number featuring Ramya Krishnan. Although the film had a slow start at the box-office, it picked up, owing to positive reviews and word-of-mouth.
