= Eaton's Corrasable Bond =

Type of stationery

Eaton's Corrasable Bond is a trademarked name for a brand of erasable typing paper. Erasable paper has a glazed or coated surface which is almost invisible, is easily removed by friction, and accepts typewriter ink fairly well. Removing the coating removes the ink on top of it, so mistakes can be easily erased once. After erasure, the paper itself is exposed, and further mistakes cannot be easily erased.

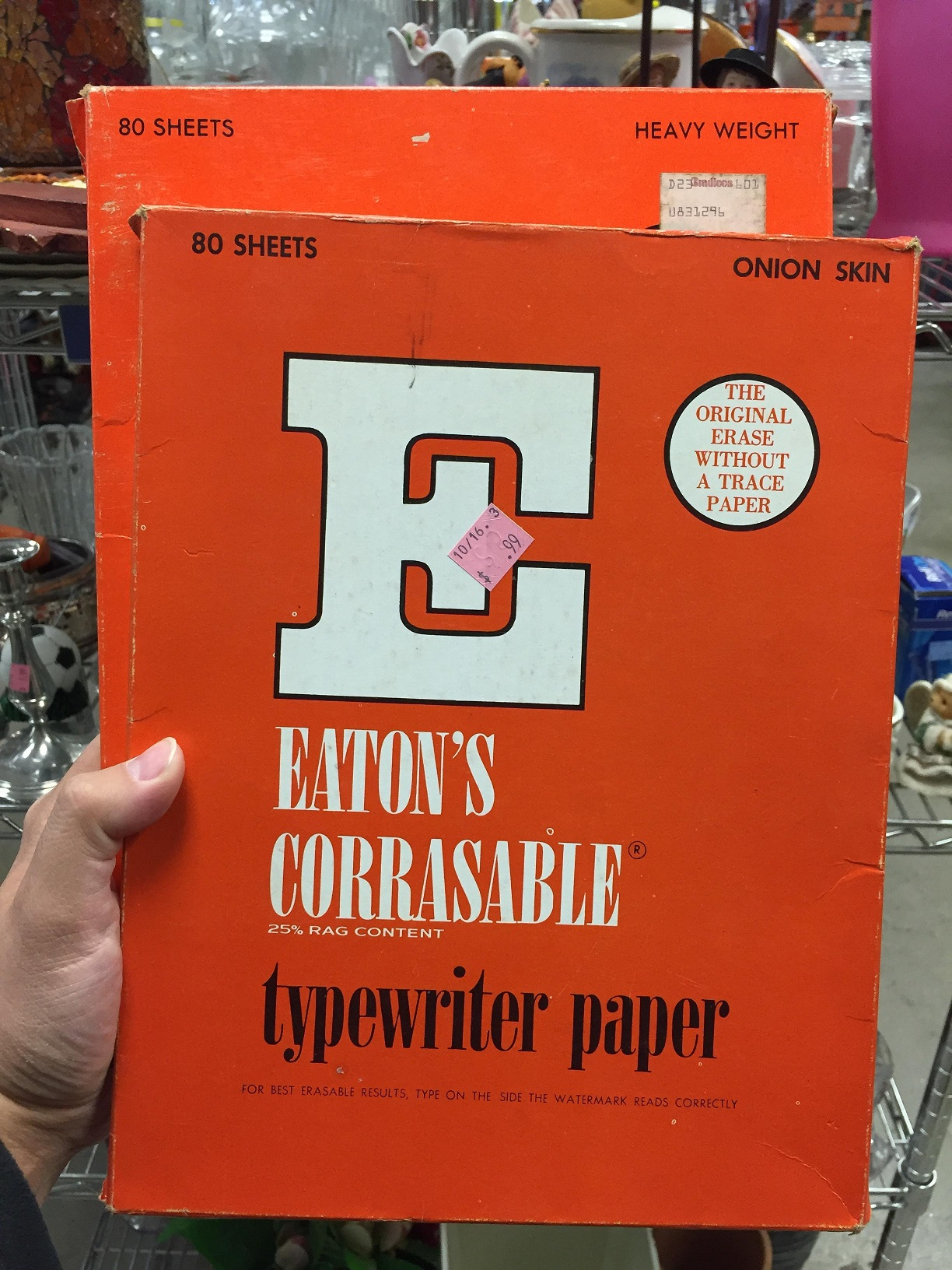

Because the coated surface does not absorb ink, documents printed on erasable paper are prone to smudging. Since the coating is intended to be easily removed by friction, the typed pages are not very durable. Under some storage conditions, the coating can cause pages to stick together. Erasable paper is not suitable for legal documents or archival records. It was available in a number of thicknesses.

Eaton's Corrasable Bond is no longer manufactured.

In the United States, Eaton's Corrasable Bond was a very familiar brand of erasable typing paper during the mid-1950s and 1960s, and "corrasable" became almost a generic name for erasable typing paper. For example, in prohibiting the use of such paper for manuscript submissions, the Linguistic Society of America refers to "Eaton's 'Corrasable Bond' and similar brands."

Writer Peter David, who worked as an editor's assistant at the E. P. Dutton imprint Elsevier/Nelson before becoming a professional writer, once related finding a submission written on erasable bond, which made the print difficult to read. In a 1992 Comics Buyer's Guide column in which he provided aspiring writers with tips on composing submissions, he stated, "Don't write on anything other than standard-weight white bond paper. I don't care what Abe Lincoln or Jack Kerouac wrote on; you're not Lincoln or Kerouac. And for crying out loud, don't use erasable bond. That wasn't a dodge the writer used in Misery to get Annie out of the house; no real writer types on erasable bond."

== In fiction ==
The paper is mentioned in the Stephen King novel Misery, when Annie Wilkes buys it for Paul Sheldon, thinking that since it is the most expensive paper, it has to be the best. When Paul shows Annie that Corrasable Bond is smudge-prone, and hence detested by editors, Annie thinks he is being ungrateful and, in a fit of bad temper, smashes her fist down onto a sitting Paul Sheldon's shattered knee, causing him agonizing pain. In the film adaptation, she instead smashes his knee with the ream of paper itself.

"Divorce or Corrasable Bond" is a poem by Daniela Gioseffi.

In the tenth chapter of Sylvia Plath's The Bell Jar, Esther, the main character, mentions this paper when she sets up a place to start writing a novel. "I counted out three hundred and fifty sheets of corrasable bond from my mother's stock"...

In the first chapter of T.C. Boyle's Outside looking in, there is a Ford Fairlane that has tires "worn as smooth as the sheets of Corrasable Bond".
