= The Snow Queen (1986 film) =

1986 film

- Original Finnish film poster.
- Directed by: Päivi Hartzell
- Written by: Päivi Hartzell
- Based on: The Snow Queen by Hans Christian Andersen
- Produced by: Päivi Hartzell
- Starring: Satu Silvo; Outi Vainionkulma; Sebastian Kaatrasalo
- Cinematography: Henrik Paersch
- Edited by: Anne Lakanen
- Music by: Jukka Linkola
- Production company: Neofilmi Oy
- Distributed by: Finnkino Oy
- Release date: 19 December 1986
- Running time: 90 minutes
- Country: Finland
- Language: Finnish
- Budget: FIM 6,130,062

The Snow Queen (Finnish: Lumikuningatar) is a 1986 Finnish fantasy film directed by Päivi Hartzell, based on the eponymous 1844 fairy tale by Hans Christian Andersen. It was an exceptionally large film production at the time it was made in Finland, with a total cost of more than 6 million Finnish marks. The Finnish Film Foundation participated in the financing of the film with 2,885,000 Finnish marks.

The film was selected as the Finnish entry for the Best Foreign Language Film at the 60th Academy Awards, but was not accepted as a nominee.

== Plot ==
The film tells about a girl named Kerttu and her journey to her friend Kai's place towards the magical kingdom of the Snow Queen. In order to rule the whole world, the Snow Queen wants the last green stone for her crown, but she can only achieve it with Kai's help. Worried Kerttu goes on a long and dangerous journey to her friend.

== Cast ==
- Satu Silvo as Lumikuningatar
- Outi Vainionkulma as Kerttu
- Sebastian Kaatrasalo as Kai
- Tuula Nyman as Noita
- Esko Hukkanen as Narri
- Pirjo Bergström as Mielitietty
- Juulia Ukkonen as Prinsessa
- Paavo Westerberg as Prinssi

== See also ==
- List of submissions to the 60th Academy Awards for Best Foreign Language Film
- List of Finnish submissions for the Academy Award for Best Foreign Language Film
