= Kauno S. Kallio =

Finnish architect

Kauno Sankari Kallio (July 31, 1877, Ruovesi, Finland – June 29, 1966, Helsinki, Finland) was a Finnish architect who designed, among other things, churches and grave monuments. He was Oiva Kallio's brother and worked with his brother.

Kallio's parents were the vicar, county reverend Pietari Antero Kallio (formerly Öst), and Lydia Charlotta Durchman. He graduated from the Vaasa Lyceum in 1896, and he graduated as an architect from the Polytechnic Institute in 1900. He initially worked in the office of architect Gustaf Nyström and in the architectural office of Nyström-Petrelius-Penttilä until he founded a joint office in 1903 with architect Werner von Essen and construction master E. Ikäläinen. This office designed several residential buildings in Helsinki. Kallio founded his own office in 1913, and his first significant work was the Tampere Theater, completed in the same year.

Kallio participated with his brother Oiva Kallio in several architectural competitions in the 1910s and 1920s, and based on their competition proposals, they designed, among other things, the facades of the Imatra power plant. Kauno S. Kallio also designed ten Kansallis-Osake-Bank branch office buildings between 1920 and 1937. Kallio then specialized in the design of church buildings, and in addition to new buildings, he also designed repairs and restorations of churches.

== Selected works ==
- Hartman's house, Vaasa Market Square (1913)
- Tampere Theater (1913)
- Alavu Church (1914)
- Jyväskylä rectory (1928)
- Repair of Vihti Church (1928–1929)
- Jämsä Church (1929)
- Taivalkoski Church (1932)
- Extension of Selini's house, Tampere (1934)
- Kuopio Art Museum
- Pohjaslahti Church, Mänttä-Vilppula
- Hiiden tribe burial monument
- Kitinoja village church, Seinäjoki (1952)
- Eno's Bell Tower, Joensuu (1957)
