= The 10th Kingdom =

American fantasy television miniseries

- DVD cover for The 10th Kingdom
- Written by: Simon Moore
- Directed by: David Carson; Herbert Wise
- Starring: Kimberly Williams; Scott Cohen; Ed O'Neill; John Larroquette; Daniel Lapaine; Dianne Wiest; Ann-Margret
- Music by: Anne Dudley
- Country of origin: United Kingdom / United States / Germany
- Original language: English
- No. of episodes: 5

Production
- Producers: Robert Halmi Sr. Robert Halmi Jr. Simon Moore
- Cinematography: Chris Howard; Lawrence Jones
- Editors: Andrew McClelland; Chris Wimble
- Running time: 417 minutes = 390 minutes (edited)
- Production companies: Carnival Films, Production Line, Studio Babelsberg, Hallmark Entertainment
- Budget: $44 million

Original release
- Network: NBC
- Release: February 27 – March 26, 2000

The 10th Kingdom is a fairytale fantasy miniseries written by Simon Moore and produced by Britain's Carnival Films, Germany's Babelsberg Film und Fernsehen, and the American Hallmark Entertainment. It depicts the adventures of a father and daughter after they are transported from New York City, through a magical mirror, into a parallel world of fairy tales.

The miniseries was initially broadcast over five nights in two-hour episodes, each airing weekly, on NBC, beginning February 27, 2000 and concluding March 26 of that same year. It won an Emmy Award for Outstanding Main Title Design in 2000. The premiere had more than 14.04 million viewers.

== Plot ==
In a hidden realm, fairy tale characters inhabit nine magical kingdoms where an Evil Queen plots to rule them. She is held in a Fourth Kingdom prison. This kingdom is under the rule of Prince Wendell, the spoiled, arrogant grandson of Snow White. Weeks before his coronation ceremony, the Queen enlists the help of the brutal Troll King and his three children to release her right before the Prince makes his annual visit to the prison. Prince Wendell is captured by the Evil Queen, who is his wicked stepmother. She turns him into a Golden Retriever while her very own retriever is transformed into a facsimile of Wendell. In a panic, the transformed Prince flees through the prison, stumbles across a mirror portal in the basement, and is transported to New York City. The Troll King orders his bumbling children Burly, Blabberwort, and Bluebell to bring back the escaped Prince while the Queen releases a half-wolf prisoner (who is simply called Wolf) to retrieve him instead.

Meanwhile, two regular Manhattan inhabitants, headstrong waitress Virginia Lewis and her oafish father Tony, are entangled in the mishaps caused by the new magical arrivals to the city, including Wolf falling helplessly in love with Virginia and Tony being given six wishes (which he foolishly uses for personal gain, upon which they have a tendency to backfire). With Virginia having already determined that the transformed Wendell (named by a fellow waitress as 'Prince' even before Virginia learns his identity)--is more than just a normal dog, Tony uses his last wish to acquire the ability to understand the dog, who urges them to travel back to The Nine Kingdoms with him to break the spell. Tony, feeling responsible for Prince, reluctantly accepts, and Virginia and Tony are taken back to the realm through the magic mirror.

At first, Tony and Virginia are desperate to just get home, while the magic mirror is being taken from place to place around the Kingdoms – being cleared out of the prison, taken as a prize for a sheep-rearing contest, and then sold in an auction. The group travels the lands in pursuit of the mirror, facing many dangers and challenges in the process, including Virginia's hair being enchanted to an impossible length, pursuit by the Queen's Huntsman, and a conspiracy by the descendants of Little Bo Peep to control a town's wishing well. During their journey, Wolf questions his loyalty to the Queen in order to gain favor with stubborn Virginia and quickly sides with them. This act prompts the Queen to send her relentless and cold-blooded Huntsman to capture the Prince along with Virginia and Tony.

Virginia eventually meets the ghost of Snow White, who reveals she is destined to save the Nine Kingdoms. Tony also recognizes the Queen as his long lost wife and Virginia’s mother. They travel to the castle to stop her, but Wolf seems to have betrayed Tony and Virginia. They are thrown into the dungeons where Tony reveals to Virginia that her mother had been suffering a mental breakdown and had tried to drown Virginia the night she left. The Queen has her imposter Prince Wendell crowned king and then tries to poison all the monarchs who attend the ceremony.

Luckily, Wolf had switched the poison for a sleeping potion, so everyone wakes up unharmed. Virginia must kill the Evil Queen in self-defense, which pains her greatly. The real Prince Wendell turns back into a human and takes the throne, pardoning the trolls, and allowing them to return to their kingdom after the death of their father. Grateful to Tony for all of his help, now-King Wendell offers him a job at the palace, which he accepts. Virginia and Wolf, now expecting a child, return to New York City.

== Cast and characters ==
- Kimberly Williams as Virginia Lewis – Virginia is a waitress who lives on the edge of Central Park with her father. Virginia, whilst very cynical and tired, is also an aspiring restaurateur, and while she claims that she does not care about her mother or dating, it soon becomes obvious that she feels very lonely. She later reveals that she blames herself for her mother leaving. At first she cares only about returning to her own world, but she eventually commits to helping Wendell rescue his kingdom. Virginia must learn how to face the pain caused when her mother abandoned her. Slowly she develops feelings for Wolf. According to Ron Wertheimer (New York Times), Virginia is a plucky waitress on her way to self-confidence.
- John Larroquette as Anthony "Tony" Lewis – Tony is a janitor and single father who is mostly oblivious of his daughter Virginia's problems, and feelings. In the beginning, he is generally a lazy, selfish coward, but forced out of his former life, he grows and fights to save Virginia, Wendell, and himself, becoming a far better person in the process.
- Scott Cohen as Wolf – Wolf is released from the Snow White Memorial Prison (he was imprisoned there for "sheep worrying") by the Evil Queen after he swears allegiance to her. He goes to New York City in search of Prince Wendell and meets Virginia, with whom he falls instantly in love. He spends most of the film helping Virginia and Tony escape the kingdoms, falling more in love with Virginia.
- Dianne Wiest as Christine White usually referred to as the Evil Queen – The main antagonist of the film and Prince Wendell's stepmother. She had been sentenced to life in prison for murdering both of Wendell's parents and almost killing him. Later in the series, she is revealed to be Virginia's mother. Prior to the events in the miniseries, Christine discovered the traveling mirror after suffering a mental breakdown and running away from a failed attempt to kill Virginia. She was taken in by the Swamp Witch (Snow White's stepmother) and became her apprentice. The plot of the series concerns her plan to take over the Nine Kingdoms. At the start of the show, she is released from prison and turns Wendell into a dog.
- Daniel Lapaine as Prince Wendell – Snow White's grandson, the spoiled, arrogant, and bored heir to the throne of the 4th kingdom, Prince Wendell spends most of the film as a Golden Retriever. He can only communicate with Tony and slowly becomes more humble and responsible. After his adventures and times with Tony, he's left somewhat fascinated by the modern 10th Kingdom (New York City) and insists on Tony building him a "bouncing castle" and thus encourages Tony to give him an Industrial Revolution.
- Rutger Hauer as The Huntsman – The Evil Queen's huntsman, who is sent to kill Virginia and Tony, carries a magical crossbow that never fails to hit the heart of a living thing when fired. The Huntsman is completely devoted to the Evil Queen and firmly believes in fate and destiny, holding no interest in mercy.
- Ed O'Neill as Relish, the Troll King – Relish is the king of the troll kingdom and the father of Burly, Blabberwort, and Bluebell. He temporarily joins forces with the Evil Queen, but later abandons her plans for conquest when he decides to take the 4th Kingdom for himself.
- Hugh O'Gorman, Dawnn Lewis, and Jeremiah Birkett as Burly, Blabberwort, and Bluebell – Three troll siblings who are released from the Snow White Memorial Prison by their father, who, not long after that, are given a task by the Evil Queen that they attempt to complete of hunting down Prince Wendell, then later Virginia and Tony. They spend a large part of the film as golden statues after Tony misuses a magic spell.
- Camryn Manheim as Snow White – She is mentioned many times and is eventually seen by only Virginia and her grandson Prince Wendell (as a dog) in a white cavern in an ice-like coffin. She has been protecting Virginia and shielding her image from the Evil Queen. Upon meeting her she tells Virginia her childhood story and tells Virginia that she is destined for many great things and gives her advice on how to kill the Evil Queen.
- Ann-Margret as Cinderella – She's one of the oldest living fabled-princesses of the Nine Kingdoms.
- Moira Lister as Virginia's Grandmother – She despises her son-in-law Tony because he's a lower class, but loves Virginia and thinks she needs to marry into high society.
- Warwick Davis as Acorn, the Dwarf – He helps Tony and the others escape from prison. He later sells various stolen goods, such as the magic mirror. He reappears again while hiding in the swamps in the very house Snow White's evil stepmother had lived. He gives Virginia a brief time to rest when she's searching for her father and even lets her see the Evil Queen's tomb. Afterward, he directs her to where she could find Tony.
- Jimmy Nail as Clayface, the Goblin – He, along with Acorn the Dwarf, helps Tony and the Others escape prison. He was supposed to appear in episode 5 but his actor took another acting job putting Acorn in his place.
- Lucy Punch as Sally Peep – A shepherdess living in Little Lamb Village on the edge of the Enchanted Forest. Virginia competes against Sally Peep in the Sheep and Shepherdess competition to win the traveling mirror, which is the first place prize.

== Production ==
Simon Moore, writer of the screenplay, wondered about what happened after the Happily Ever After of old fairytales. His vision became The 10th Kingdom.

According to The New York Times "There are humorous allusions to familiar characters like the Seven Dwarfs and Rapunzel throughout the 10 hours and appearances by updated versions of Snow White (Camryn Manheim) and Cinderella (Ann-Margret)." Executive producer Robert Halmi Sr. explains, "We wanted to take the flip side of these well-known characters. For instance, Cinderella is now 200 years old. And Camryn took her part because she loved the idea that Snow White was now overweight." Camryn Manheim elaborates, "Well, I've been playing her in my bedroom for many years now, so I was ready for her. But it was wonderful, I grew up reading about Snow White and fantasizing about being the fairest of them all, and there I was. My manager told me that NBC had offered me the role of Snow White and I said, 'I'll take it.' I agreed to do it even before reading the script because I was so thrilled that they were moving away from the conventional Snow White. I am playing Snow White, and we've come very far from that image when I grew up and we're getting all kinds of images of beauty. So it was really thrilling to get in that tight corset and be able to accentuate my assets, no pun intended and, yes, it was a throwback to my finer days" The Times reported that Virginia Lewis's portrayer, Kimberly Williams, "prefers to work in film and theatre rather than television. "Because TV happens so fast, I feel a sense of panic," she explains. Yet, despite the misgivings, she could not resist the offer to star in The 10th Kingdom alongside Dianne Wiest, Jimmy Nail, and Rutger Hauer. "Simon has woven together all the old fairytales and updated them, exploring what happened after Happily Ever After," explains Williams, whose character Virginia is a New York waitress thrust into a parallel world inhabited by trolls and an evil stepmother."

== Broadcast and reception ==
The miniseries was initially broadcast as five two-hour episodes on NBC, beginning February 27, 2000. The 10th Kingdom won an Emmy Award for Outstanding Main Title Design in 2000.

It was broadcast in the United Kingdom on Sky One.

Variety's Laura Fries (Feb. 21, 2000) asserted that "Kimberly Williams is doe-eyed and pretty and is heavily featured throughout, but 10 hours is a lot for this star to carry on her shoulders." Christopher Null Filmcritic.com felt that "Larroquette was an unfortunate casting choice. 30 minutes of Night Court has always been my limit on the guy. 417 minutes is too much of his abrasive attitude to handle."

== Related media ==
During the original airing of The 10th Kingdom there was a toll-free number displayed so that one could order a set of the novelization, the CD soundtrack, and the entire miniseries on three VHS tapes. In May 2000, The 10th Kingdom was released by Hallmark Entertainment and Artisan Entertainment (now Lions Gate Entertainment) on VHS as both a two-tape set and as an Extended Play single tape edition. Approximately two hours of the miniseries were cut out to make it fit on two tapes. None of the footage dealt with major plot elements, but the sheer amount removed resulted in a significantly different viewing experience.

The miniseries was later released as aired on a three-disc DVD set in October 2000. A two-disc set followed in May 2002, which utilized one double-sided disc and one single-sided disc and included the special feature "The 10th Kingdom: The Making of an Epic", hosted by John Larroquette. The complete 5 episode series was made available for instant streaming on Netflix as of the 3rd week of August 2012. This is the first time the series was presented in individual episode format since the initial broadcast on NBC.

On March 19, 2013, after several years of unavailability, Mill Creek Entertainment reissued the complete miniseries on 3 DVDs, retaining the making-of featurette and presents the miniseries as five separate parts. Also on that date, it was made available on Amazon.

On November 3, 2015, Mill Creek Entertainment released "The 10th Kingdom - 15th Anniversary Special Edition" Blu-ray, marking its first-ever high-definition release.

The novelization, released in February 2000 by Hallmark-Kensington Books, was written by Kristine Kathryn Rusch and Dean Wesley Smith under the name Kathryn Wesley. The novel was based on an early version of the script; however, only a few differences exist between the novel and the film, with most being slight changes in conversations and other minor details. For a number of years, it was available in a package with the VHS release of the movie and the soundtrack, but it is now out of print.

== Soundtrack ==
Varèse Sarabande released a soundtrack album on compact disc, featuring the score by Anne Dudley and the Miriam Stockley cover version of "Wishing on a Star" heard over the opening title and end credits of each episode.

=== Track listing ===
| No. | Title | Length |
|---|---|---|
| 1. | "The Four Who Saved the Nine Kingdoms" | 2:40 |
| 2. | "Standing on the Edge of Greatness" | 1:50 |
| 3. | "Six Glorious Wishes" | 2:03 |
| 4. | "Addicted to Magic" | 2:43 |
| 5. | "The House of White" | 2:44 |
| 6. | "Troll Trouble" | 3:45 |
| 7. | "Flowers Only Grow Where There Are Seeds" | 2:18 |
| 8. | "The Dwarves of Magic Mountain" | 2:32 |
| 9. | "Nothing Escapes the Huntsman" | 2:26 |
| 10. | "A Stepmother's Curse" | 3:04 |
| 11. | "The Dog Formerly Known as Prince" | 1:56 |
| 12. | "Blood on the Snow" | 1:28 |
| 13. | "Trolls in New York" | 1:25 |
| 14. | "A Travelling Mirror" | 1:59 |
| 15. | "Kissing Town" | 2:16 |
| 16. | "A Gypsy Incantation" | 2:21 |
| 17. | "These Are Dark Days" | 3:14 |
| 18. | "Seven Years Bad Luck" | 2:32 |
| 19. | "The Days of Happy Ever After Are Gone" | 2:13 |
| 20. | "When the Wild Moon Calls You" | 2:34 |
| 21. | "Still Lost in the Forest" | 2:57 |
| 22. | "Do Not Think, Become" | 2:19 |
| 23. | "Wishing on a Star" (Performed by Miriam Stockley) | 1:23 |
| Total length: | | 54:50 |
