= Pori Brewery =

Former brewery in Pori, Finland

Coordinates: 61°29′22″N 21°47′22″E

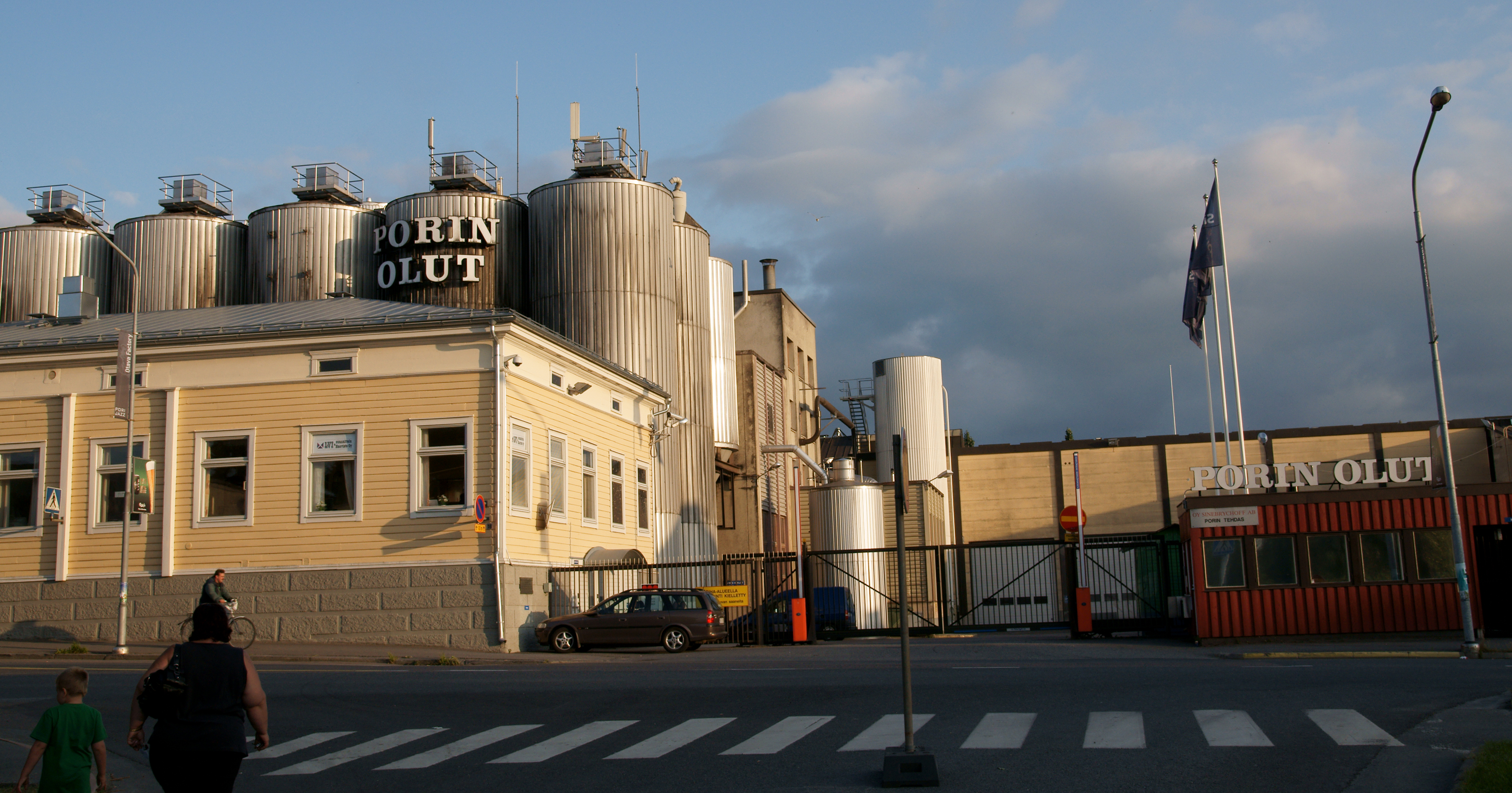
Pori Brewery in 2009.

Pori Brewery (Finnish: Porin Oluttehdas) was a brewery in Pori, Finland established 1853. It was last owned by Danish brewing company Carlsberg and closed in 2009. Pori Brewery was the second oldest brewery in Finland and one of the oldest in Nordic countries.

Pori Brewery was established by three local businessmen Anton Björnberg, K.J. Löneberg and Isaak Karström. It was first known as Bayerska Bryggeriet (The Bavarian Brewery). In 1898 the brewery merged with another Pori based brewery and was newly named as Bäckmans Ölbryggeri Ab (The Bäckman Beer Brewery). In the 1920s Bäckman's brewery ended to the ownership of Sulo Salmelin, a businessman from Tampere who owned the Pyynikki Brewery in his hometown. From 1940 Pori Brewery was a part of the Pyynikki Brewery. Since 1959 it worked again as an independent company known by the name Porin Oluttehdas. In 1972 the brewery was bought by Finnish brewing company Sinebrychoff which was owned by Carlsberg from 1997.

== History ==
March 2009 Carlsberg Group announced of closing the Pori Brewery and it was finally shut down in September. The annual beer production of Pori Brewery was about 40 million litres. It was 10 per cent of Sinebrychoff's total annual production. The company now operates in Finland with one brewery based in Kerava.

== Brands ==
The most known beer of Pori Brewery was Karhu which was brewed in Pori since 1929. It was a brand mainly known at the Pori region up to the 1990s after it was marketed nationwide. Karhu reached a huge success and at the end of the decade it was the most popular beer in Finland. Karhu is still brewed by Sinebrychoff in Kerava.

In the 1970s and 1980s Pori Brewery was also manufacturing soft drinks like Pepsi and Teem under the license from PepsiCo.

== After the closing ==
Pori Brewery was located near the city center by the river Kokemäenjoki. The plot is planned for residential area and the structures of the old brewery will mostly be demolished. In July 2013 the brewery area served as a concert venue for Pori Jazz festival as a temporary stage Otava Factory was built on the warehouse site.

== Gallery ==
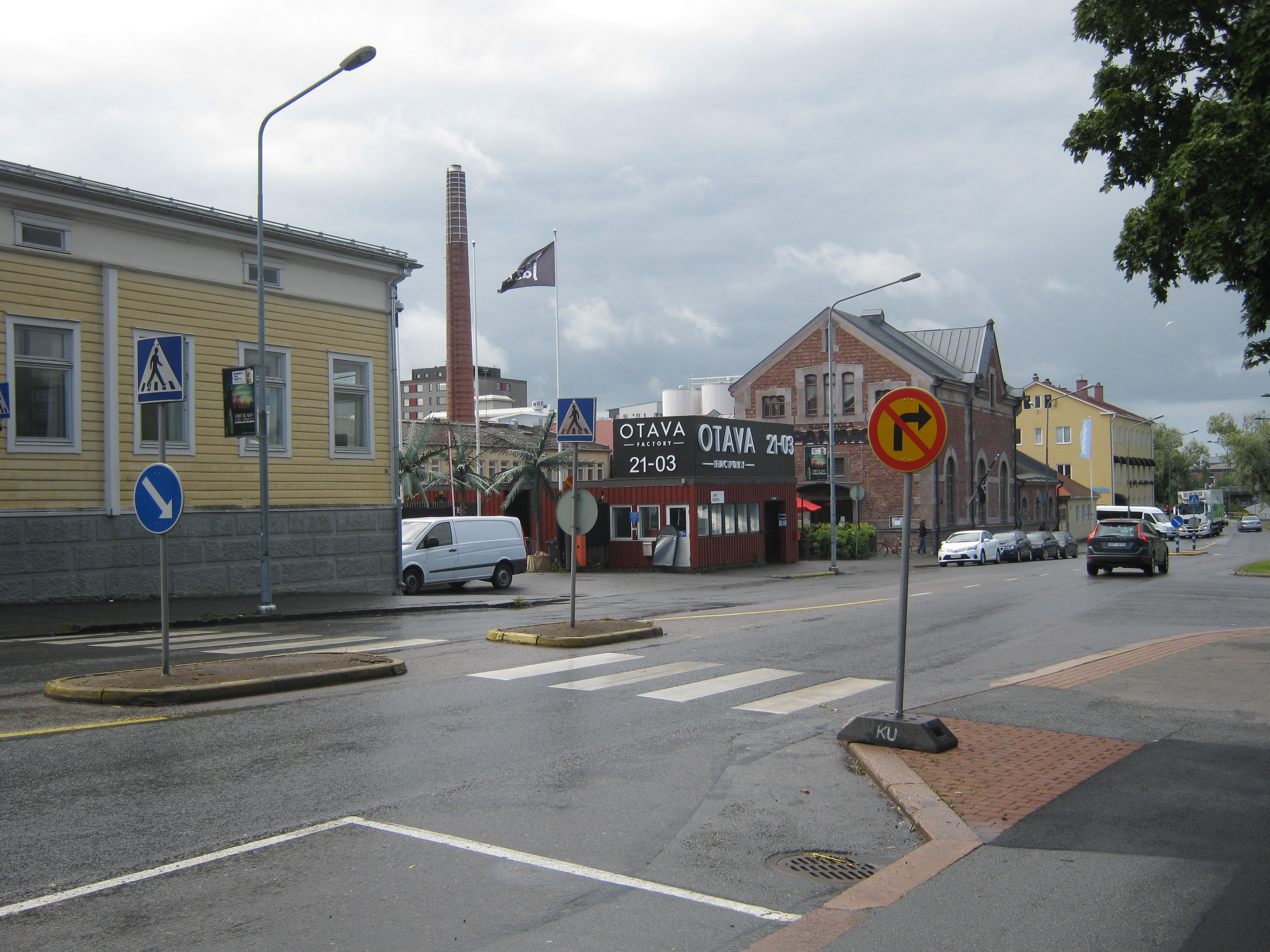
Main gate during Pori Jazz festival 2013

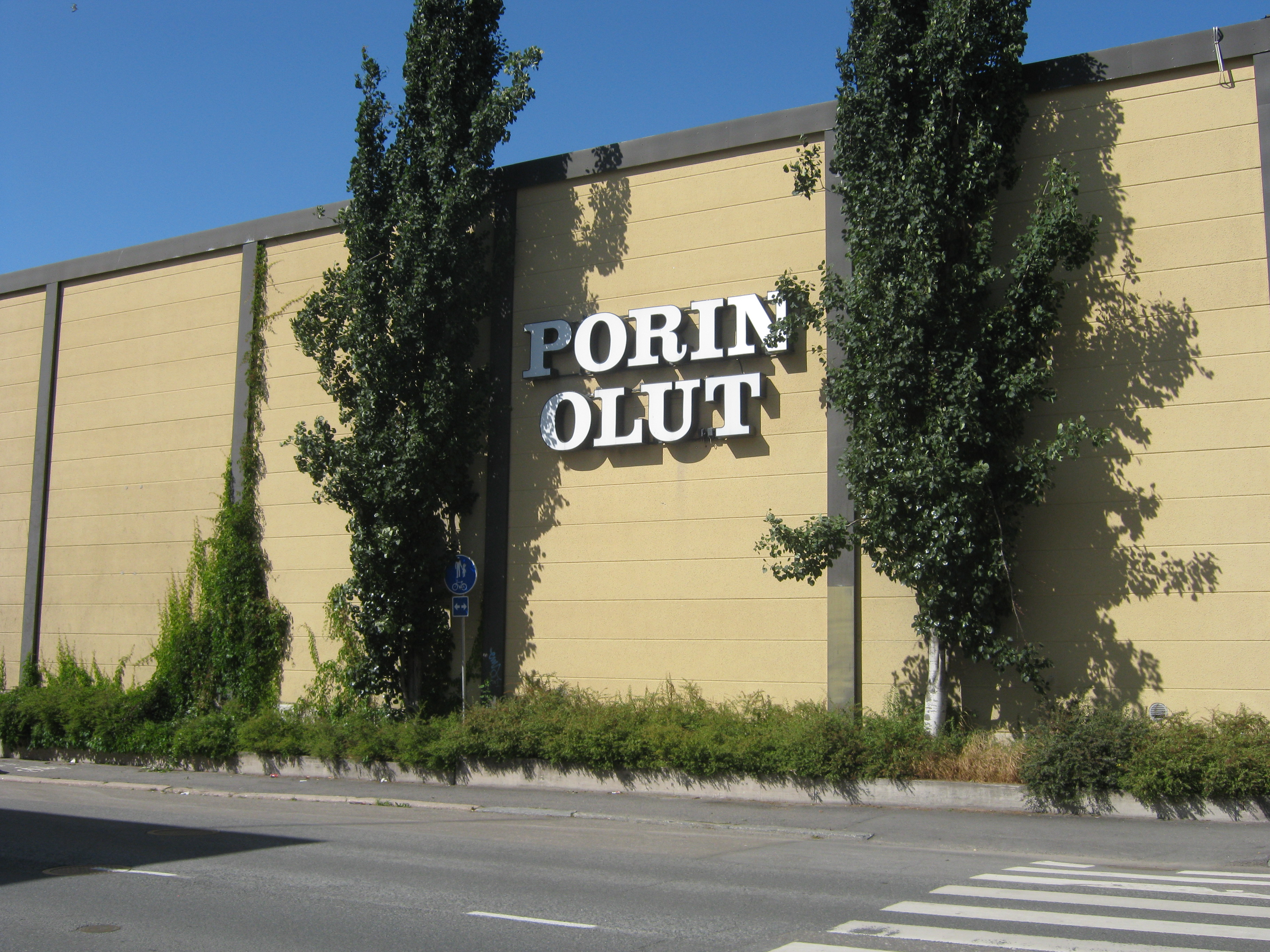
Warehouse

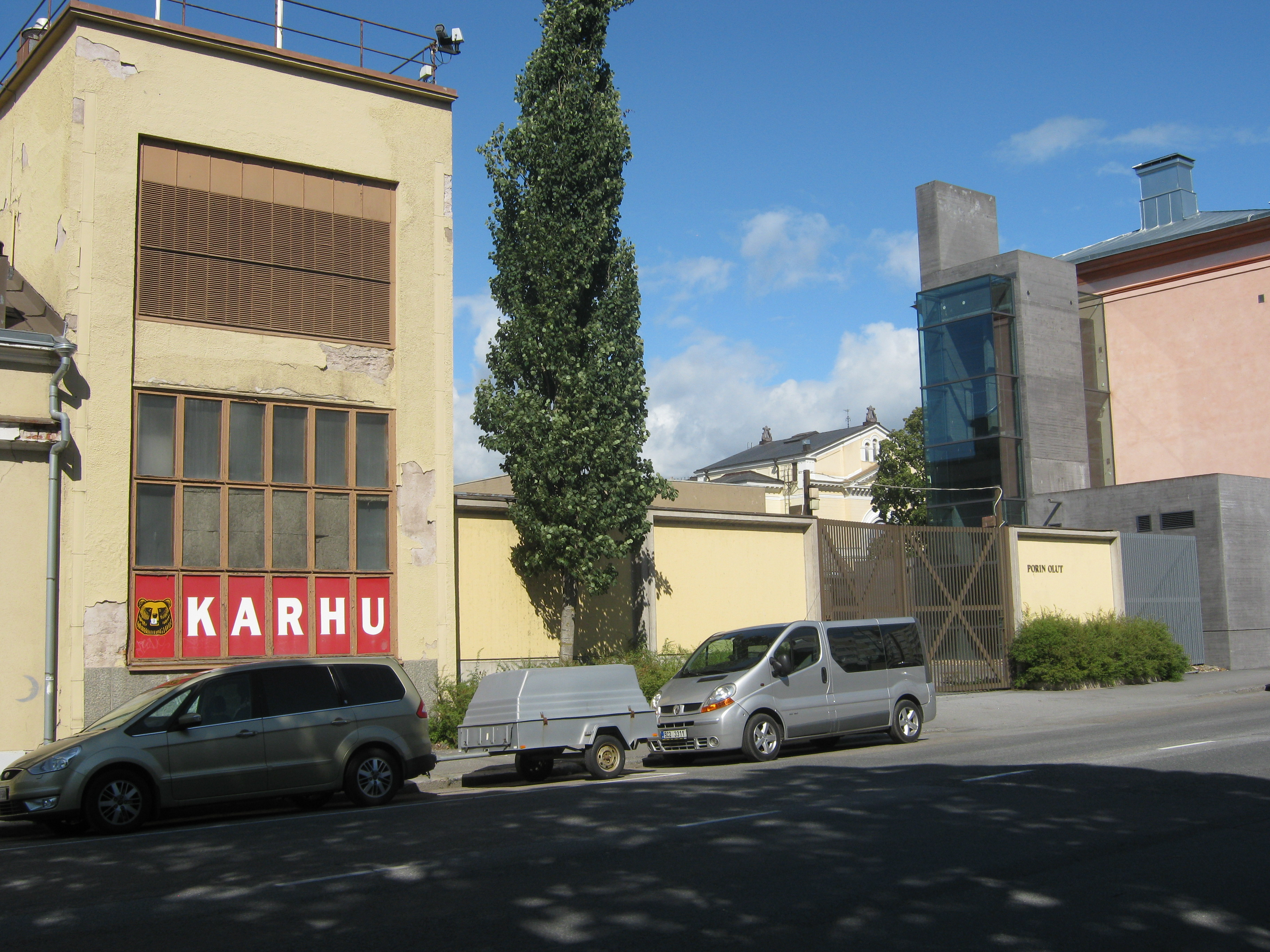
Warehouse gate, Hotel Otava on the right
