= Hotel Otava =

Hotel in Pori, Finland

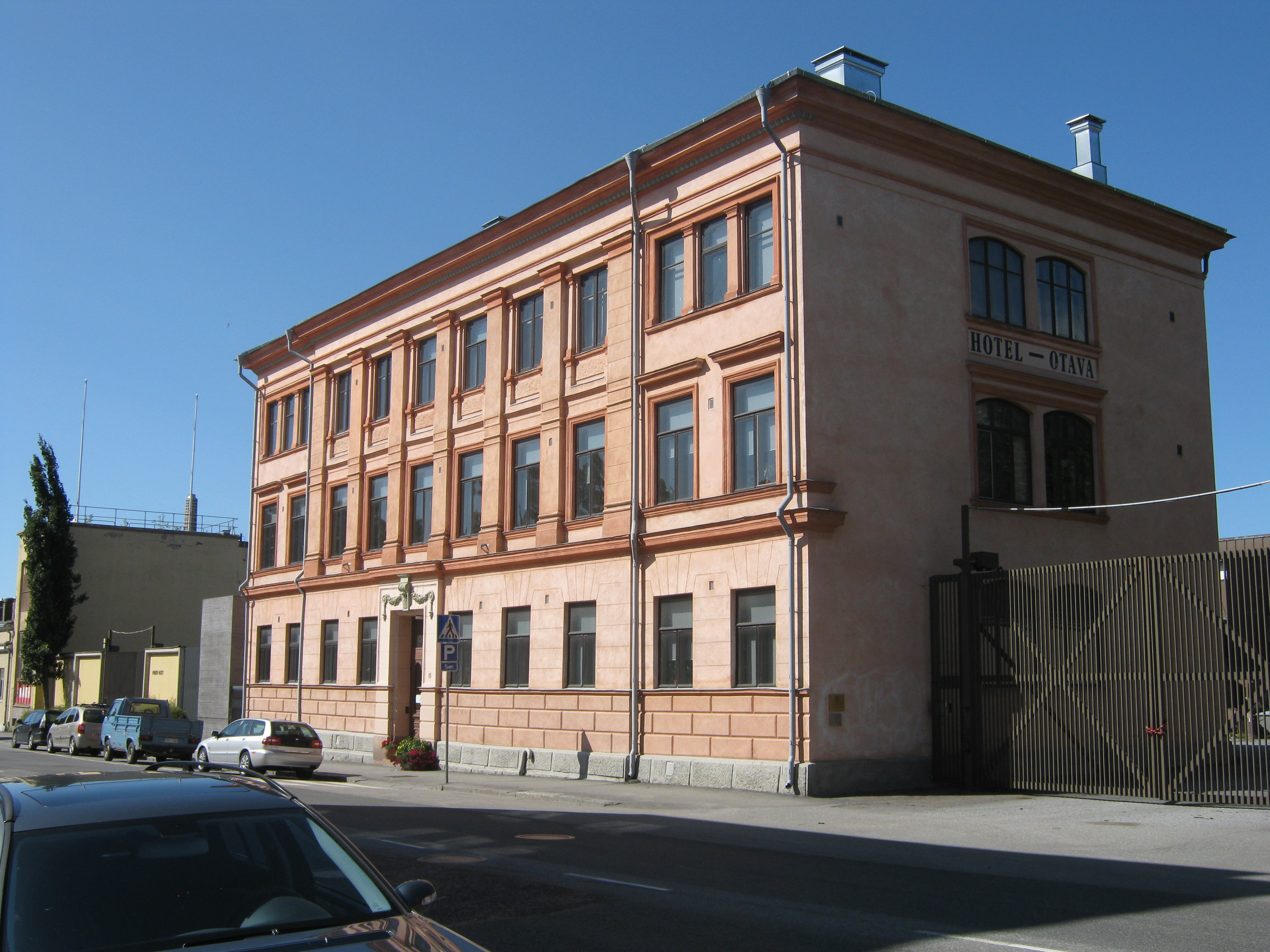
Hotel Otava in July 2013

Hotel Otava was a hotel in Pori, Finland, that operated between 1857 and 1985. On its time of closing, Hotel Otava was the oldest hotel-restaurant in Finland. The Neo-Renaissance building is designed by the Swedish architect C. J. von Heideken. Today it works as an office building for the city administration. Hotel Otava was named after the Finnish-language name of the constellation Big Dipper.

The building is located on the same block with the 1853 established Pori Brewery and the 1884 opened Pori Theatre. It is a part of the old town which is listed as a cultural environment of national significance by the Finnish National Board of Antiquities.

== History ==
The building was originally built in 1857 with two storeys, consisting of accommodation and a drawing room, which was later changed to become a theatre. The building took its current form in 1891, when a third storey was added, as had been originally planned by the architect, C. J. von Heideken.

Hotel Otava is considered to be the birthplace of the Finnish-language theatre as the Finnish National Theatre gave its first performance at the hotel's auditorium on 13 October 1872. During the World War II, the hotel hosted the staff of the German troops, which had an airbase at the Pori Airport. After the war, the hotel accommodated the Russian Allied Commission staff officers. Hotel Otava was also one of the concert venues of the annual Pori Jazz festival, which is one of the major European jazz festivals. Artists performing at Otava include names like Bobby Hutcherson, Champion Jack Dupree and Herbie Hancock.

In 1882, the theatre was converted into become a concert hall and a dance hall.

The hotel closed on 28 February 1985, Kalevala Day; it was, at the time, the longest continually open hotel-restaurant in Finland.

=== Present day usage ===
The city of Pori bought the property in 1997. In 2000, a six-year long renovation took place at a cost of three million euros, and the building was rebuilt to its original size. The building is now used as an office building for the city administration.

In July 2016, a ceiling on the building's first floor collapsed, causing the building to be closed for six months to allow repairs to take place, with the twenty affected employees moving to the City Hall. During the survey, it was discovered that the ceiling of the third floor was architecturally different to that of the other floors.
