= Annie Wilkes =

Fictional character in the 1987 novel Misery

- Kathy Bates as Annie Wilkes in the 1990 film adaptation
- First appearance: Misery (novel)
- Last appearance: The Monkey (film)
- Created by: Stephen King
- Portrayed by: Kathy Bates (1990); Sharon Gless (1992); Tuija Vuolle (1994); Susan Penhaligon (2005); Laurie Metcalf (2015); Henna Haverinen (2019); Lizzy Caplan (2019); Madison Johnson (2019, child); Ruby Cruz (2019, teen); Mari Turunen (2019); Mirva Tolppanen (2022); Satu Silvo (2025); Danica Dreyer (2025)

In-universe information
- Full name: Anne Marie Wilkes Dugan
- Nickname: Dragon Lady
- Gender: Female
- Occupation: Nurse (R.N.; formerly)
- Family: Carl Wilkes (father; deceased); Crysilda B. Wilkes (mother; novel canon); Nancy Wilkes (mother; film canon); Paul E. Wilkes (brother); Evangeline Wilkes (half-sister, Castle Rock only)
- Spouse: Ralph Dugan (divorced)
- Nationality: American

Annie Wilkes is a fictional character from Stephen King's 1987 novel Misery, in which she acts as one of the two central characters and main antagonist. In 2022, King picked her as his personal favorite character among all those he created in his literary career.

A nurse by training, Annie is a devoted fan of the works of romance author Paul Sheldon, whom she rescues after a car accident and brings back to her home. As she nurses him back to health, Sheldon gradually realizes how deranged Annie is, and becomes her unwilling captive. The character has become one of the stereotypes of the nurse as a torturer and angel of mercy.

The character has been portrayed in various audio, screen and stage adaptations of Misery, notably in a 1990 film adaptation in which she was portrayed by Kathy Bates, who won the Academy Award for Best Actress for her performance. A heavily altered version of the character also acts as main protagonist of the second season of the television series Castle Rock (itself loosely based on various works of King) in 2019, in which she is primarily portrayed by Lizzy Caplan, and as a minor supporting character in the 2025 film The Monkey, portrayed by Danica Dreyer.

== Character background ==
The novel provides Wilkes' backstory, stating that she was born in Bakersfield, California, on April 1, 1943, and graduated from the University of Southern California's nursing school with honors in 1966. After several years of working in hospitals across the country, she settled in a remote portion of Colorado's Western Slope.

In both the book and film, Wilkes rescues protagonist Paul Sheldon after he breaks both of his legs in a car accident, and takes him to her home to convalesce. She fawns over Sheldon, a writer of romance novels starring her favorite literary character, Misery Chastain; she professes to be his "number one fan" and says that she loves him. She also implies that she has visited the hotel where Sheldon finishes his novels as he was staying there. These statements, and the fact that she is not in a hurry to take him to a hospital, make Sheldon uneasy. He has studied psychological disorders as part of his research for the Misery series, and suspects early on that Wilkes is mentally unstable.

Wilkes is furious upon discovering Sheldon killed off Misery in his latest novel. She tells him she has not called a hospital or told anybody about him and makes a veiled threat on his life. She holds him captive in her home and subjects him to a series of physical and psychological tortures. She also forces him to burn the only copy of a novel he felt would put him back on track as a mainstream author, and then makes him write a new novel bringing Misery back to life. Sheldon writes the book as Wilkes wants, but bridles at her treatment. Using his wheelchair, he sneaks out of his room several times while Wilkes is away.

On one of his trips out of his room, Sheldon finds Wilkes' old scrapbook and learns from the newspaper clippings that she is a serial killer whose spree dates back to her childhood in Bakersfield. Among her victims were a neighboring family, her own father, her college roommate, and a hitchhiker with whom she had a brief fling. Sheldon also learns that she killed several patients at other hospitals where she worked, but no one suspected foul play because the victims were either elderly or gravely injured. However, while serving as head maternity nurse at a hospital in Boulder, eleven infants in her care died under mysterious circumstances. She was tried for their deaths, but acquitted due to lack of evidence. Sheldon also finds that Wilkes was formerly married to a physical therapist named Ralph Dugan, who later divorced her, citing "mental cruelty". The last picture is an article about Sheldon's own disappearance, leading him to fear that he is Wilkes' next victim.

Sheldon does not know it, but Wilkes has known all along that he has been sneaking around her house. This sets off one of the film's most infamous scenes, in which she breaks his ankles with a sledgehammer to stop him from escaping. In the book, she chops off his foot with an axe and cauterizes it with a blowtorch and later severs his thumbs with an electric knife when he complains about a missing letter on his typewriter (neither of these things happen in the film).

In the book, Wilkes murders a Colorado state trooper who sees Sheldon in her house by stabbing him with a wooden cross and running him over with a lawnmower. In the film, the local sheriff comes to Wilkes' farm to investigate Sheldon's disappearance. Wilkes drugs Sheldon and hides him in her basement before subsequently killing the officer by shooting him in the back with a double-barrelled shotgun when he hears Sheldon's cries for help.

Wilkes then says they should "celebrate" the new novel in a murder–suicide. Sheldon pretends to go along with it, telling her he needs a bottle of Dom Pérignon champagne and a cigarette, as per his usual practice after finishing a book. He soaks the manuscript with lighter fluid he picked up in the basement and sets it ablaze. While Wilkes tries to put the fire out, Sheldon overpowers her by cracking her over the head with his typewriter and choking her. In the film, he chokes her with pages of the burnt novel. In the book, he chokes her with blank pages which she believes to be the book; the real novel is hidden from sight and was later published.

She ultimately dies of a fractured skull; Sheldon is then rescued by police. In the book, she fractures her skull when she slips and falls against the mantle of the guest room bed. When the police go in to search the bedroom where Wilkes is believed to have died, they find it empty. It is later revealed that, despite being mortally wounded, she escaped the bedroom and died in her barn with her hands on a chainsaw, which she presumably intended to use on Sheldon. In the movie, Sheldon trips her up so she falls and cracks her head on the corner of the typewriter she forced him to use; she recovers from this and attacks him, but he kills her by ramming a cast iron pig doorstop into her head.

== Personality ==
King characterizes Annie Wilkes as a cunning, brutal and devious woman who hides her malice behind a cheery façade. Both the novel and the film portray her as extremely paranoid, and also suggest that she may have borderline personality disorder. In the novel, she has day-long bouts with depression, during which she is seen maiming herself; Sheldon also finds evidence that she gorges herself on vast quantities of food. She has an unhealthy obsession with romance novels, particularly Sheldon's Misery series.

She abhors profanity, to the point that she will fly into fits of rage if it is used in front of her. She instead expresses anger with distinctive minced oaths such as "cockadoodie" and "dirty bird." In the novel, however, she lets more conventional profanities slip on occasion. In both the book and the film adaptation, she calls Sheldon a "cocksucker" while threatening to kill him during the final fight scene. She has violent tantrums over insignificant matters. For instance, when Sheldon complains that the packet of Eaton's Corrasable Bond paper she bought for him is smudge-prone, she smashes his still-healing knee; in the book, when he mentions that her typewriter is missing a key, she cuts off his thumb.

King has noted that Wilkes "may seem psychopathic to us, but it's important to remember that she seems perfectly sane and reasonable to herself – heroic, in fact, a beleaguered woman trying to survive in a hostile world filled with cockadoodie brats".

In a special feature on the collectors' edition DVD, forensic psychologist Reid Meloy said that Wilkes' personality (as portrayed by Kathy Bates) is a virtual catalog of mental illness. According to Meloy, Wilkes has bipolar disorder, where someone can have manic psychoses as well as depressions. He also believes her profile is typical of people who stalk celebrities.

In his commentary on the film available on the DVD, director Rob Reiner notes that Wilkes is loosely based on Genene Jones, a nurse who is believed to have killed as many as 50 children who were in her care over a two-year period.

== Other appearances ==
The fictional version of King that appears in The Dark Tower VII: The Dark Tower (2004) discusses Annie Wilkes.

Annie Wilkes is mentioned in Kim Newman's novella, The Other Side of Midnight. In the novel, which is set in Newman's alternate history crossover Anno Dracula series, Wilkes is the murderer of John Lennon. When she is arrested for the crime, she tells the press that she loved Lennon, but that he had to die for splitting up the Beatles.

Kathy Bates reprised her role as Annie Wilkes in a 2008 commercial for DirecTV, with the setting being the infamous scene where she breaks Paul Sheldon's ankles.

The Tamil film Julie Ganapathi (2003), directed by Balu Mahendra, is based loosely on the novel. South Indian actress Saritha plays the film's title character, who is based on the Annie Wilkes character.

The novel was later adapted into a play, which ran on Broadway from November 2015 to February 2016. Annie was played by Laurie Metcalf. At the 70th Annual Tony Awards, Metcalf was nominated for Best Actress in a Play for her performance.

In the United Kingdom, the novel was also adapted into a play in 1992, starring Sharon Gless as Annie Wilkes, and later into a 2005 play, starring Susan Penhaligon.

Simon Moore's 1992 play is translated into Finnish by Timo Ojala under the title Piina in 1994, and there Annie Wilkes is played by Tuija Vuolle. There are also four Finnish play adaptations based on the 1990 film adaptation's screenplay by William Goldman. In the first of them, Annie Wilkes is played by Mari Turunen, in the second one, played by Henna Haverinen, in the third one, played by Mirva Tolppanen, and in the fourth one, played by Satu Silvo.

An alternate version of a young Annie Wilkes appears in the second season of the television series Castle Rock, and is portrayed by Lizzy Caplan.

In the first series of RuPaul's Drag Race: UK Versus the World, contestant Baga Chipz portrayed Kathy Bates as Annie Wilkes for the show's signature Snatch Game celebrity impersonation challenge, for which she was named one of the two challenge winners.

Annie Wilkes was originally going to appear in The Lego Batman Movie (2017) along with additional Phantom Zone criminals, but this never came into fruition.

An alternate version of a young Annie Wilkes appears in the film The Monkey, and is portrayed by Danica Dreyer. The babysitter of young twins Hal and Bill Shelburn, after the two find and activate a cursed drum-playing toy monkey, it causes Annie to be decapitated while with them at a hibachi restaurant.

== Reception ==
The American Film Institute included Wilkes (as played by Bates) in their "100 Heroes & Villains" list, ranking her as the 17th most iconic villain (and sixth most iconic villainess) in film history.

During an interview in April 2022, King selected Wilkes as his top pick character, saying that "she [Wilkes] was fun".
