= Simon Moore (writer) =

British screenwriter and playwright

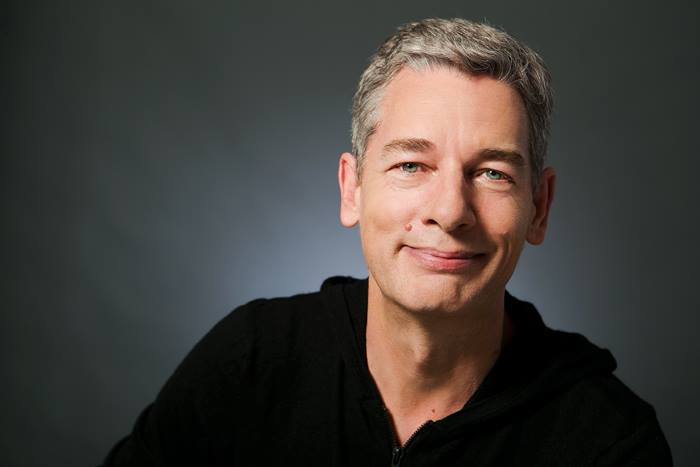
- Born: 1 March 1958 (age 68); Lambeth, London, England
- Occupations: Screenwriter, Playwright, Director
- Known for: Traffik

Simon Moore is a British screenwriter and playwright. He is best known as writer for the 1989 six-part Channel 4 miniseries about the international illegal drug trade, Traffik, the basis for the 2000 American crime film Traffic and the 2004 three-part USA network miniseries by the same name.

Moore won the Primetime Emmy Award for Outstanding Writing for a Limited or Anthology Series or Movie for Gulliver's Travels.

== Career ==
In 1984 Moore submitted a pilot script to the BBC, about female ex-convicts struggling to carve out a life for themselves after release from prison. Within a week, he was commissioned to write a six part serial, Inside Out, which was transmitted on BBC2 in early 1985.

Moore wrote and directed the 1991 film noir Under Suspicion. He wrote the 1995 cult Western The Quick and the Dead in late 1992, writing it as a homage to the Spaghetti Westerns of Sergio Leone, particularly the Dollars Trilogy starring Clint Eastwood. Moore decided the lead character should be a female, stating that "when you introduce women into that kind of world, something very interesting happens and you have an interesting dynamic straight away." The names of the lead villain (Herod) and the town (Redemption) were intentional allusions to the Bible. Moore considered directing his own script as an independent film and shooting The Quick and the Dead on a $3–4 million budget in either Spain or Italy. Sony Pictures Entertainment purchased Moore's script in May 1993.

Moore wrote the teleplay for the 1996 miniseries adaptation of Gulliver's Travels, which won five Emmys, including Outstanding Miniseries and Outstanding Writing for a Miniseries for Moore. He also wrote the fantasy miniseries The 10th Kingdom and Dinotopia. Moore co-wrote the comedy musical Up on the Roof, which was adapted into the 1997 UK musical comedy film Up on the Roof with Moore directing.

As a playwright, he adapted Stephen King's novel Misery for the stage, with the play premiering in London's West End theatre in 1992 and revived in London in 2005.

== Personal life ==
Moore lives in Los Angeles, California.

== See also ==
- List of British playwrights since 1950
- List of Primetime Emmy Award winners
