= Pori Theatre =

Theatre in Pori, Finland

Coordinates: 61°29′22″N 21°47′32″E

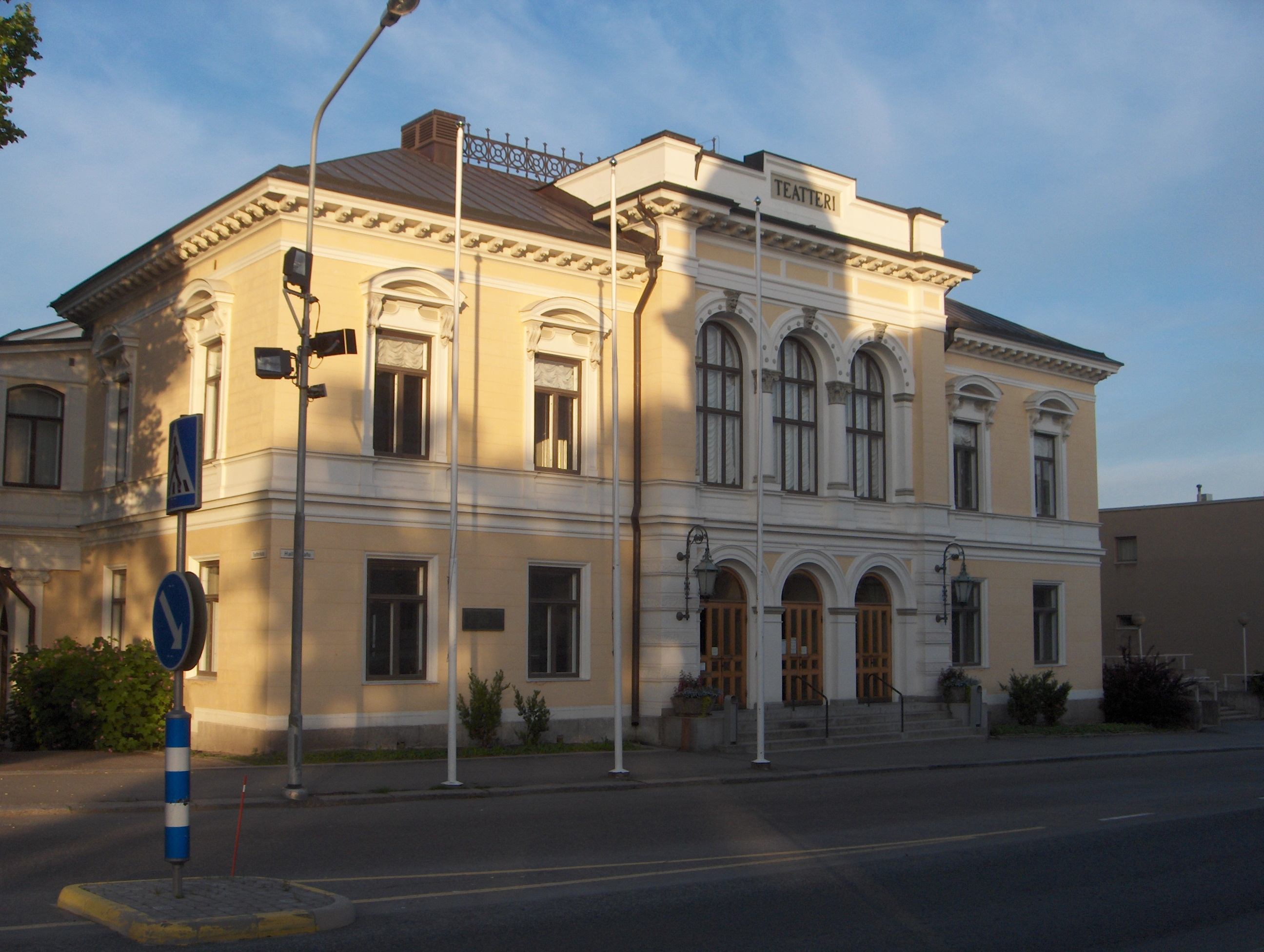
Pori Theatre

Pori Theatre (Finnish: Porin Teatteri) is a theatre in Pori, Finland. It was established in 1931 as a merger of two local theatres. Theatre director is Christian Lindroos

== History ==
Pori is considered as the home of Finnish-language theatre as the Finnish National Theatre gave its first audition in Pori at the Hotel Otava in 1872. First Swedish-language theatre groups in Pori were established in the 1840s. Pori Workers' Theater (Porin Työväen Teatteri), founded 1909, was the first professional theatre in Pori. It merged with Pori Stage Theatre (Porin Näyttämö) in 1931. Former actors and directors of Pori Theatre include names like Matti Kassila, Ilmari Unho, Tommi Rinne and Saara Ranin.

== Theatre building ==
Theatre is located in a 1884 completed Renaissance Revival style building which was designed by Swedish architect Johan Erik Stenberg. Its interior is one of the most prestigious in Finland. The main auditorium has 313 seats and the 1974 opened studio stage 100. Pori Theatre has been one of the concert venues of Pori Jazz festival since 1967. A statue of Finnish author Hj. Nortamo is placed by the theatre.
