= Misery (film) =

1990 film by Rob Reiner

- Theatrical release poster
- Directed by: Rob Reiner
- Screenplay by: William Goldman
- Based on: Misery by Stephen King
- Produced by: Rob Reiner; Andrew Scheinman
- Starring: James Caan; Kathy Bates; Richard Farnsworth; Frances Sternhagen; Lauren Bacall
- Cinematography: Barry Sonnenfeld
- Edited by: Robert Leighton
- Music by: Marc Shaiman
- Production companies: Castle Rock Entertainment; Nelson Entertainment
- Distributed by: Columbia Pictures
- Release date: November 30, 1990
- Running time: 107 minutes
- Country: United States
- Language: English
- Budget: $18–20 million
- Box office: $61.3 million

Misery is a 1990 American psychological thriller film directed by Rob Reiner from a screenplay by William Goldman. It is based on Stephen King's 1987 novel and stars James Caan as famed novelist Paul Sheldon, who is held captive by Annie Wilkes (Kathy Bates), an obsessive fan. The supporting cast includes Richard Farnsworth, Frances Sternhagen, and Lauren Bacall.

Development on an adaptation of King's novel began after producer Andrew Scheinman recommended it to Reiner, who recruited Goldman to write the film's screenplay. Casting for the film was extensive: several actors were considered for the roles of Sheldon and Wilkes before Caan and Bates were hired; Bates was a stage actress, mostly unknown to film audiences. Principal photography began in February 1990, with filming locations including Genoa, Nevada and Los Angeles. The film's score was composed by Marc Shaiman.

Misery was produced by Castle Rock Entertainment and Nelson Entertainment and was theatrically released in the United States on November 30, 1990, by Columbia Pictures. It grossed $61.3 million worldwide and received positive reviews from critics, with praise for the horror and performances of the leading duo. Bates's Academy Award for Best Actress win made Misery the only film based on a novel by King to win an Academy Award.

== Plot ==
Famed novelist Paul Sheldon writes Victorian romance novels featuring a character named Misery Chastain. Though the books are profitable, Paul despises the series and wishes to focus on writing more serious literature. He has just left the cabin in Silver Creek, Colorado, where he completed a manuscript he hopes will launch his post-Misery career. En route to New York City, he is caught in a blizzard and crashes his Mustang over an embankment. Annie Wilkes finds him and brings him to her remote home.

Paul awakens to find himself bedridden with broken legs and a dislocated shoulder. Annie, a nurse who claims to be his "number one fan", says she will care for him until telephone lines are reconnected and the local roads are cleared following the storm. Annie's disturbing behavior gradually emerges, culminating in her reading the latest Misery novel and discovering that Misery dies at the end. Flying into a rage, she reveals that she never informed anyone about Paul, and no one knows his whereabouts.

Annie forces Paul to burn the only copy of his new manuscript. She buys typing paper and an antique typewriter, then orders him to bring Misery back in a new book. Paul reluctantly agrees, but he insists Annie return to town to buy his preferred smudge-free typing paper. He later finds a bobby pin and, while Annie is away, uses it to unlock the bedroom door. While exploring the house in a wheelchair, Paul discovers that the phone line is disconnected and the outer doors cannot be opened without a key. He knocks down a small penguin figurine, and places it back facing the wrong direction.

Paul grabs a sheet of his painkiller pills from Annie's stash before returning to his room, using the bobby pin to re-lock the door. He begins stockpiling his painkillers and uses them to try to drug Annie by extracting the powder and pouring it into her wine glass. She accidentally foils his plan when she spills her wine glass without taking a sip. On his second trip outside of his room, he finds a scrapbook filled with newspaper clippings revealing that Annie was tried for several infant deaths at the hospital where she worked; she claimed innocence, the case lacked evidence and the trial collapsed. Annie discovers that Paul escaped the room and breaks his ankles with a sledgehammer to hobble him.

Buster, the local sheriff, investigates Paul's disappearance and follows clues to Annie's home. When he finds Paul drugged in the basement, Annie kills Buster with a shotgun; she intends to kill Paul in a murder–suicide, but he persuades her to let him finish the novel. While she fetches the wheelchair, he hides a can of lighter fluid inside his trousers.

That night, Paul finishes the novel and sends Annie to the kitchen for celebratory champagne before dousing the manuscript with lighter fluid. When Annie returns, Paul holds up the final pages and taunts her about Misery's ending before lighting them on fire. As a horrified Annie pleads for him not to do this, Paul sets the manuscript on fire so Annie can never know Misery's fate; as she is distracted, he strikes her with the typewriter. With the manuscript destroyed, Annie becomes enraged and tries to kill Paul. They engage in a violent struggle, with Paul suffering a gunshot wound and Annie briefly getting knocked out when she falls head-first onto the typewriter. The struggle ends when Paul strikes Annie in the face with a doorstop, killing her.

Eighteen months later, Paul, now walking with a cane, meets with his literary agent, Marcia, at a New York City restaurant. They discuss his first post-Misery novel, which has received critical acclaim and is expected to be a bestseller, and Paul admits that his ordeal helped revive his passion for writing. Marcia asks him to consider a nonfiction book about his experience, but Paul declines. A waitress approaches, and he momentarily hallucinates that she is Annie, commenting that he still thinks about her once in a while. The waitress says she is his "number one fan", and Paul meekly replies, "That's very sweet of you."

== Cast ==
- James Caan as Paul Sheldon
- Kathy Bates as Annie Wilkes
- Frances Sternhagen as Deputy Virginia
- Richard Farnsworth as Sheriff Buster
- Lauren Bacall as Marcia Sindell
- Graham Jarvis as Libby
- Jerry Potter as Pete

J. T. Walsh makes an uncredited cameo appearance as State Patrol Colonel Sherman Douglas. Director Rob Reiner also makes an uncredited appearance as a helicopter pilot.

== Production ==
=== Development ===
Producer Andrew Scheinman read Stephen King's novel Misery on an airplane, and later recommended it to his director partner at Castle Rock Entertainment, Rob Reiner. Reiner eventually invited writer William Goldman to write the screenplay for the film.

In the novel, Annie Wilkes severs one of Paul Sheldon's feet with an axe. Goldman loved the scene and argued for its inclusion, but Reiner insisted it be changed so that she only breaks his ankles. Goldman subsequently wrote that that was the correct decision, as a visual depiction of an amputation would lead the audience to hate Annie rather than sympathize with her madness.

=== Casting ===
The part of Paul Sheldon was originally offered to William Hurt (twice), then Kevin Kline, Michael Douglas, Harrison Ford, Dustin Hoffman, Robert De Niro, Al Pacino, Richard Dreyfuss, Jack Nicholson, Gene Hackman, and Robert Redford, but they all turned it down. Warren Beatty was interested in the role, wanting to turn him into a less passive character, but eventually had to drop out as post-production of Dick Tracy extended. Eventually, someone suggested James Caan, who agreed to play the part. Caan commented that he was attracted to the fact that Sheldon was a role unlike any of his others, and that "being a totally reactionary character is really much tougher." Anjelica Huston and Bette Midler were both offered the role of Annie Wilkes, but both of them turned it down. Midler would later say that she deeply regretted this decision. According to Reiner, it was Goldman who suggested that Wilkes should be played by Kathy Bates, a stage actress who was effectively unknown to film audiences. Billy Bob Thornton auditioned for the role of Sheriff Buster's deputy and was offered it, but the part was cut from the film.

=== Filming ===
Principal photography began in February 1990. Exterior scenes set in the town of Silver Creek were shot in Genoa, Nevada, while interiors were filmed at Hollywood Center Studios in Los Angeles.

== Music ==
Misery

Film score by Marc Shaiman
- Released: July 1, 1991
- Genre: Soundtrack
- Length: 29:55
- Label: Bay Cities

The film's score was composed by Marc Shaiman. Three recordings by Liberace, Annie Wilkes's favorite musician, are featured in the film, as is "Shotgun" by Junior Walker and the All-Stars, which plays before Paul's car accident.

== Reception ==
=== Box office ===
Misery grossed $10,076,834 on its opening weekend, finishing second at the box office behind Home Alone. It eventually finished with $61 million domestically.

=== Critical response ===
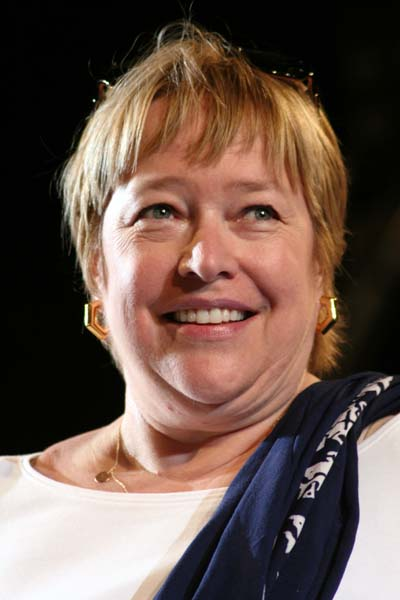
Kathy Bates's acclaimed role won her an Academy Award for Best Actress

On review aggregator website Rotten Tomatoes, Misery has an approval rating of 86% based on 156 reviews. The site's critics consensus reads: "Elevated by standout performances from James Caan and Kathy Bates, this taut and frightening film is one of the best Stephen King adaptations to date." At Metacritic, which assigns a weighted mean rating to reviews, the film has a score of 75 out of 100, based on 23 critics, indicating "generally favorable reviews". Audiences polled by CinemaScore gave the film an average grade of "A−" on an A+ to F scale.

Roger Ebert of the Chicago Sun-Times gave the film a rating of three stars out of four, stating that "it is a good story, a natural, and it grabs us." Variety called it "a very obvious and very commercial gothic thriller, a functional adaptation of the Stephen King bestseller." Derek Malcolm of The Guardian gave it a positive review, writing that it "plays enough tricks on us so that we don't ever treat anything quite seriously and Goldman's script has enough good lines and situations to keep one interested in exactly what is coming next", and praised the cast, especially Bates, writing that her "demented devotee in Misery is inspired casting." Vincent Canby of The New York Times praised Kathy Bates' performance, calling it "a genuinely funny performance as the mad Annie, as gaudily written in Mr. Goldman's screenplay as it is in Mr. King's novel."

King himself has stated that Misery is one of his top ten favorite film adaptations, in his 2009 collection Stephen King Goes to the Movies.

In 2003, Annie Wilkes was ranked #17 on AFI's 100 Years...100 Heroes & Villains list. The "hobbling" scene in the film, in which Annie breaks Paul's ankles with a sledgehammer, was ranked #12 on Bravo's 2004 program The 100 Scariest Movie Moments. In 2009, Chris Eggertsen of Bloody Disgusting ranked Misery fourth place in his list of "10 Claustrophobic Horror Films".

In 2014, WhatCulture ranked Kathy Bates' role first in top "10 Most Convincing Movie Psychopath Performances", Taste of Cinema ranked the film 7th among the "30 Great Psychopath Movies That Are Worth Your Time", and GamesRadar+ named Annie one of the "50 Creepiest Movie Psychopaths.

=== Accolades ===
Award	Category	Nominee(s)	Result	Ref.
Academy Awards	Best Actress	Kathy Bates	Won	
Chicago Film Critics Association Awards	Best Actress	Kathy Bates	Won	
Chicago Film Critics Association Awards	Most Promising Actress	Kathy Bates	Nominated	
Dallas–Fort Worth Film Critics Association Awards	Best Actress	Kathy Bates	Won	
Golden Globe Awards	Best Actress in a Motion Picture – Drama	Kathy Bates	Won	
New York Film Critics Circle Awards	Best Actress	Kathy Bates	Nominated	
Saturn Awards	Best Horror Film		Nominated	
Saturn Awards	Best Actor	James Caan	Nominated	
Saturn Awards	Best Actress	Kathy Bates	Nominated	
Saturn Awards	Best Supporting Actress	Frances Sternhagen	Nominated	
Saturn Awards	Best Writing	William Goldman	Nominated	
USC Scripter Awards		William Goldman (screenwriter); Stephen King (author)	Nominated	

== Home media ==
Nelson Entertainment and its parent company, New Line Home Video, first released Misery on VHS on July 11, 1991, and New Line re-released it in 1992, after Nelson went bankrupt. The film was later re-released on VHS by PolyGram Video and on DVD by MGM Home Entertainment on December 22, 1998. A 25th anniversary edition DVD and Blu-ray was released on September 8, 2015, by 20th Century Fox Home Entertainment and MGM Home Entertainment. Currently, Warner Bros. Home Entertainment (Castle Rock Entertainment's sister company) re-issued home video rights under the license from MGM. The Shout! Factory released a collector's edition Blu-ray under their Scream Factory label on November 28, 2017. A 4K Ultra HD Blu-ray was released through Kino Lorber on October 12, 2021.

== See also ==
- List of films featuring psychopaths and sociopaths
- Misery (play)
- Julie Ganapathi

== Bibliography ==
- Goldman, William (2001). Which Lie Did I Tell?: More Adventures in the Screen Trade. Knopf Doubleday. ISBN 978-0375703195.
