= Tampere Theatre =

Theatre in Tampere, Finland

Coordinates: 61°29′53″N 023°45′45″E

- Tampereen teatteri
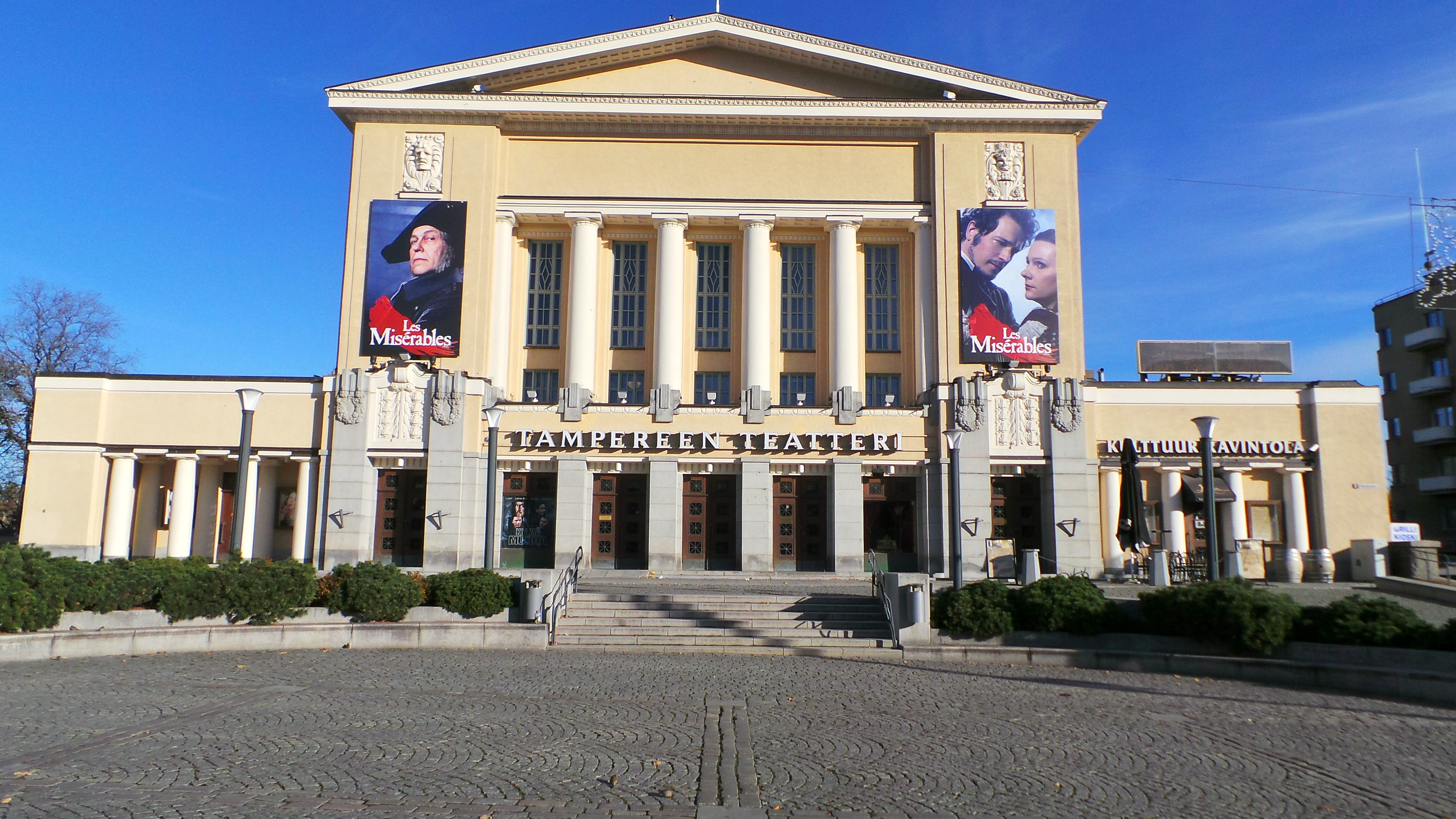
- The theatre in 2016
- Interactive map of Tampere Theatre
- Location: Tampere Central Square, Tampere, Finland
- Owner: City of Tampere
- Surface: concrete

Construction
- Built: 1912
- Architects: Kauno S. Kallio & Oiva Kallio
- General contractor: Th. Schreck

Website
- https://tampereenteatteri.fi

The Tampere Theatre (Finnish: Tampereen Teatteri) is one of the two main active theatres in Tampere, Finland, along with the Tampere Workers' Theatre. The theatre was started in 1904 and the opening ceremony was held in 1913.

The main location of the Tampere Theatre is located right in the centre of Tampere, opposite the municipality hall on the shore of Tammerkoski. The building was designed in the National Romantic architecture style. The second location, called the Frenckell Hall, is also on the Tammerkoski shore in an old brick building in the Frenckell quarter.

== See also ==
- Tampere Theatre Festival
